= List of National Wildlife Refuges =

As of 2022, there are 588 National Wildlife Refuges in the United States, with the addition of the Green River National Wildlife Refuge. Refuges that have boundaries in multiple states are listed only in the state where the main visitor entrance is located. The newest refuge replaces the Cherry Valley National Wildlife Refuge in Pennsylvania. Refuges are listed regardless of whether or not they are open to the public, of which many are not.

The National Wildlife Refuge System and National Fish Hatcheries.

As of January 2026, the National Wildlife Refuge System consists of 573 national wildlife refuges, managed by the U.S. Fish and Wildlife Service. The system has seen several significant additions since 2023, including the establishment of the Paint Rock River National Wildlife Refuge in Tennessee (September 2023), the Everglades to Gulf Conservation Area in Florida (March 2024), and the Southern Maryland Woodlands National Wildlife Refuge (December 2024), the latter being the 573rd unit in the system.

Additionally, major land protection expansions were authorized in 2024 for the Aransas (TX) and Roanoke River (NC) refuges, totaling over one million acres of new conservation potential. In January 2026, the Department of the Interior issued Director's Order 230, initiating a programmatic, comprehensive review of all 573 units to evaluate their alignment with the agency's mission and long-term resource allocation.

== Regions ==
The United States is divided into eight regions for administrative purposes:

- Pacific Region (Region 1)
  - American Samoa
  - Guam
  - Hawaiʻi
  - Idaho
  - Northern Mariana Islands
  - Oregon
  - U.S. Minor Outlying Islands (1 and 4)
  - Washington
- Southwest Region (Region 2)
  - Arizona
  - New Mexico
  - Oklahoma
  - Texas
- Midwest Region (Region 3)
  - Illinois
  - Indiana
  - Iowa
  - Michigan
  - Missouri
  - Minnesota
  - Ohio
  - Wisconsin
- Southeast Region (Region 4)
  - Alabama
  - Arkansas
  - Florida
  - Georgia
  - Kentucky
  - Louisiana
  - Mississippi
  - North Carolina
  - Puerto Rico
  - South Carolina
  - Tennessee
  - U.S. Minor Outlying Islands (1 and 4)
  - U.S. Virgin Islands

- Northeast Region (Region 5)
  - Connecticut
  - Delaware
  - District of Columbia
  - Maine
  - Maryland
  - Massachusetts
  - New Hampshire
  - New Jersey
  - New York
  - Pennsylvania
  - Rhode Island
  - Vermont
  - Virginia
  - West Virginia
- Mountain-Prairie Region (Region 6)
  - Colorado
  - Kansas
  - Montana
  - North Dakota
  - Nebraska
  - South Dakota
  - Utah
  - Wyoming
- Alaska Region (Region 7)
  - Alaska
- Pacific Southwest Region (Region 8)
  - California
  - Nevada

== List of Wildlife Refuges ==
Refuge Name	Location	State	Date Established	Area
Bon Secour National Wildlife Refuge	Baldwin County	AL	1980	6,816 acres (27.58 km^{2})
Cahaba River National Wildlife Refuge	Bibb County	AL	September 25, 2002	2,997 acres (12.13 km^{2})
Choctaw National Wildlife Refuge	Choctaw County	AL	1964	4,218 acres (17.07 km^{2})
Eufaula National Wildlife Refuge	Barbour County, Alabama; Stewart County, Georgia	AL	1964	11,184 acres (45.26 km^{2})
Fern Cave National Wildlife Refuge	Jackson County	AL	1981	199 acres (0.81 km^{2})
Key Cave National Wildlife Refuge	Lauderdale County	AL	January 3, 1997	1,060 acres (4.3 km^{2})
Mountain Longleaf National Wildlife Refuge	Calhoun County	AL	May 29, 2003	9,016 acres (36.49 km^{2})
Sauta Cave National Wildlife Refuge	Jackson County	AL	1978	264 acres (1.07 km^{2})
Watercress Darter National Wildlife Refuge	Jefferson County	AL	1980	24 acres (0.097 km^{2})
Wheeler National Wildlife Refuge	Morgan County, Limestone County, and Madison County	AL	1938	35,000 acres (140 km^{2})
Alaska Maritime National Wildlife Refuge	Alaska	AK	December 2, 1980	3,421,420 acres (13,846.0 km^{2})
Alaska Peninsula National Wildlife Refuge	Alaska	AK	December 2, 1980	3,574,259 acres (14,464.51 km^{2})
Arctic National Wildlife Refuge	Alaska	AK	December 6, 1960	19,287,042 acres (78,051.89 km^{2})
Becharof National Wildlife Refuge	Alaska	AK	December 2, 1980	1,200,419.52 acres (4,857.9254 km^{2})
Innoko National Wildlife Refuge	Alaska	AK	December 2, 1980	3,850,800.94 acres (15,583.6385 km^{2})
Izembek National Wildlife Refuge	Alaska	AK	December 2, 1980	315,000 acres (1,270 km^{2})
Kanuti National Wildlife Refuge	Alaska	AK	December 2, 1980	1,637,000 acres (6,620 km^{2})
Kenai National Wildlife Refuge	Alaska	AK	December 2, 1980	1,912,470.47 acres (7,739.4934 km^{2})
Kodiak National Wildlife Refuge	Alaska	AK	August 19, 1941	1,880,891.52 acres (7,611.6979 km^{2})
Koyukuk National Wildlife Refuge	Alaska	AK	1980	3,550,159.96 acres (14,366.9876 km^{2})
Nowitna National Wildlife Refuge	Alaska	AK	1980	1,560,239.99 acres (6,314.0672 km^{2})
Selawik National Wildlife Refuge	Alaska	AK	December 2, 1980	2,150,561.94 acres (8,703.0154 km^{2})
Tetlin National Wildlife Refuge	Alaska	AK	December 2, 1980	700,286.95 acres (2,833.9607 km^{2})
Togiak National Wildlife Refuge	Alaska	AK	December 2, 1980	4,104,246.80 acres (16,609.2975 km^{2})
Yukon Delta National Wildlife Refuge	Alaska	AK	December 2, 1980	19,226,606.25 acres (77,807.3150 km^{2})
Yukon Flats National Wildlife Refuge	Alaska	AK	December 2, 1980	8,636,951.06 acres (34,952.5009 km^{2})
Rose Atoll National Wildlife Refuge	Rose Atoll	AS	1973	39,066 acres (158.09 km^{2})
Bill Williams River National Wildlife Refuge	La Paz and Mojave Counties	AZ	1993	6,105 acres (24.71 km^{2})
Buenos Aires National Wildlife Refuge	Pima County	AZ	1985	117,107 acres (473.92 km^{2})
Cabeza Prieta National Wildlife Refuge	Yuma County	AZ	1939	860,010 acres (3,480.3 km^{2})
Cibola National Wildlife Refuge	LaPaz County, Arizona; Imperial County, California	AZ	1964	16,627 acres (67.29 km^{2})
Havasu National Wildlife Refuge	Mojave County, Arizona; San Bernardino County, California	AZ	1941	37,515 acres (151.82 km^{2})
Imperial National Wildlife Refuge	LaPaz and Yuma Counties, Arizona; Imperial County, California	AZ	1941	25,768 acres (104.28 km^{2})
Kofa National Wildlife Refuge	Yuma and LaPaz Counties	AZ	1939	665,400 acres (2,693 km^{2})
Leslie Canyon National Wildlife Refuge	Cochise County	AZ	1988	2,770 acres (11.2 km^{2})
San Bernardino National Wildlife Refuge	Cochise County	AZ	1982	2,309 acres (9.34 km^{2})
Bald Knob National Wildlife Refuge	White County	AR	1993	15,022 acres (60.79 km^{2})
Big Lake National Wildlife Refuge	Mississippi County	AR	1915	11,038 acres (44.67 km^{2})
Cache River National Wildlife Refuge	Woodruff County and several others	AR	1986	67,500 acres (273 km^{2})
Felsenthal National Wildlife Refuge	Union, Ashley, and Bradley Counties	AR	1970	64,902 acres (262.65 km^{2})
Holla Bend National Wildlife Refuge	Pope and Yell Counties	AR	1957	7,057 acres (28.56 km^{2})
Logan Cave National Wildlife Refuge	Benton County	AR	March 14, 1989	123 acres (0.50 km^{2})
Overflow National Wildlife Refuge	Ashley County	AR	1980	13,973 acres (56.55 km^{2})
Pond Creek National Wildlife Refuge	Sevier County	AR	1994	27,300 acres (110 km^{2})
Wapanocca National Wildlife Refuge	Crittenden County	AR	January 1961	5,484 acres (22.19 km^{2})
White River National Wildlife Refuge	Monroe County and several others	AR	1935	160,756 acres (650.56 km^{2})
Antioch Dunes National Wildlife Refuge	Contra Costa County	CA	1980	55 acres (0.22 km^{2})
Bitter Creek National Wildlife Refuge	Kern County	CA	1985	14,097 acres (57.05 km^{2})
Blue Ridge National Wildlife Refuge	Tulare County	CA	1982	897 acres (3.63 km^{2})
Butte Sink Wildlife Management Area	Butte/Colusa/Sutter Counties	CA	1980	11,044 acres (44.69 km^{2})
Castle Rock National Wildlife Refuge	Del Norte County	CA	1979	14 acres (0.057 km^{2})
Clear Lake National Wildlife Refuge	Modoc County	CA	1911	46,460 acres (188.0 km^{2})
Coachella Valley National Wildlife Refuge	Riverside County	CA	1985	3,709 acres (15.01 km^{2})
Colusa National Wildlife Refuge	Colusa County	CA	1945	4,507 acres (18.24 km^{2})
Delevan National Wildlife Refuge	Colusa County	CA	1962	5,797 acres (23.46 km^{2})
Don Edwards San Francisco Bay National Wildlife Refuge	Alameda/Santa Clara/San Mateo Counties	CA	1974	30,000 acres (120 km^{2})
Ellicott Slough National Wildlife Refuge	Santa Cruz County	CA	1975	168 acres (0.68 km^{2})
Farallon National Wildlife Refuge	Farallon Islands, near San Francisco	CA	1969	41.9 acres (0.170 km^{2})
Grasslands Wildlife Management Area	Merced County	CA	1979	70,000 acres (280 km^{2})
Guadalupe-Nipomo Dunes National Wildlife Refuge	Santa Barbara/San Luis Obispo Counties	CA	2000	2,553 acres (10.33 km^{2})
Hopper Mountain National Wildlife Refuge	Ventura County	CA	1974	2,471 acres (10.00 km^{2})
Humboldt Bay National Wildlife Refuge; *Lanphere Dunes	Humboldt County	CA	1971	4,000 acres (16 km^{2})
Kern National Wildlife Refuge	Kern County	CA	1960	1,249 acres (5.05 km^{2})
Lower Klamath National Wildlife Refuge	Siskiyou County also in Klamath County, Oregon	CA	1908	50,913 acres (206.04 km^{2})
Marin Islands National Wildlife Refuge	Marin County	CA	1992	-
Merced National Wildlife Refuge	Merced County	CA	1951	10,262 acres (41.53 km^{2})
Modoc National Wildlife Refuge	Modoc County	CA	1961	7,000 acres (28 km^{2})
North Central Valley Wildlife Management Area	Sacramento Valley	CA	1991	46,460 acres (188.0 km^{2})
Pixley National Wildlife Refuge	Tulare County	CA	1959	6,939 acres (28.08 km^{2})
Sacramento National Wildlife Refuge	Colusa/Glenn Counties	CA	1937	10,819 acres (43.78 km^{2})
Sacramento River National Wildlife Refuge	Butte/Glenn/Tehama Counties	CA	1989	10,146 acres (41.06 km^{2})
Salinas River National Wildlife Refuge	Monterey County	CA	1974	316 acres (1.28 km^{2})
San Diego Bay National Wildlife Refuge	San Diego County	CA	1999	2,620 acres (10.6 km^{2})
San Diego National Wildlife Refuge	San Diego County	CA	-	11,152 acres (45.13 km^{2})
San Joaquin River National Wildlife Refuge	San Joaquin/Stanislaus Counties	CA	1987	7,000 acres (28 km^{2})
San Luis National Wildlife Refuge	Merced County	CA	1966	26,600 acres (108 km^{2})
San Pablo Bay National Wildlife Refuge	Napa/Solano/Sonoma Counties	CA	1970	13,190 acres (53.4 km^{2})
Seal Beach National Wildlife Refuge	Orange County	CA	1972	911 acres (3.69 km^{2})
Sonny Bono Salton Sea National Wildlife Refuge	Imperial County	CA	1930	2,200 acres (8.9 km^{2})
Stone Lakes National Wildlife Refuge	Sacramento County	CA	1994	17,641 acres (71.39 km^{2})
Sutter National Wildlife Refuge	Sutter County	CA	1945	2,591 acres (10.49 km^{2})
Tijuana Slough National Wildlife Refuge	San Diego County	CA	1980	2,521 acres (10.20 km^{2})
Tule Lake National Wildlife Refuge	Modoc/Siskiyou Counties	CA	1928	39,116 acres (158.30 km^{2})
Willow Creek-Lurline Wildlife Management Area	Colusa/Glenn Counties	CA	1985	5,795 acres (23.45 km^{2})
Alamosa National Wildlife Refuge	Alamosa, Conejos and Costilla Counties	CO	1993	11,169 acres (45.20 km^{2})
Arapaho National Wildlife Refuge	Jackson County	CO	1967	23,464 acres (94.96 km^{2})
Baca National Wildlife Refuge	Saguache and Alamosa Counties	CO	2003	78,697 acres (318.48 km^{2})
Browns Park National Wildlife Refuge	Moffat County	CO	1965	12,150 acres (49.2 km^{2})
Monte Vista National Wildlife Refuge	Alamosa and Rio Grande Counties	CO	1953	14,800 acres (60 km^{2})
Rocky Flats National Wildlife Refuge	Jefferson County	CO	July 12, 2007	3,953 acres (16.00 km^{2})
Rocky Mountain Arsenal National Wildlife Refuge	Adams County	CO	1992	15,988 acres (64.70 km^{2})
Two Ponds National Wildlife Refuge	Jefferson County	CO	1992	72.2 acres (0.292 km^{2})
Stewart B. McKinney National Wildlife Refuge	Connecticut	CT	1972	950 acres (3.8 km^{2})
Bombay Hook National Wildlife Refuge	Kent County	DE	1937	16,251 acres (65.77 km^{2})
Prime Hook National Wildlife Refuge	Sussex County	DE	1963	10,144 acres (41.05 km^{2})
Archie Carr National Wildlife Refuge	Brevard County; Indian River County	FL	1991	900 acres (3.6 km^{2})
Arthur R. Marshall Loxahatchee National Wildlife Refuge	Palm Beach County	FL	1951	147,392 acres (596.47 km^{2})
Caloosahatchee National Wildlife Refuge	Lee County	FL	1921	40 acres (0.16 km^{2})
Cedar Keys National Wildlife Refuge	Levy County	FL	1929	891 acres (3.61 km^{2})
Chassahowitzka National Wildlife Refuge	Citrus County; Hernando County	FL	1941	31,000 acres (130 km^{2})
Crocodile Lake National Wildlife Refuge	Monroe County	FL	1980	6,686 acres (27.06 km^{2})
Crystal River National Wildlife Refuge	Citrus County	FL	1983	80 acres (0.32 km^{2})
Egmont Key National Wildlife Refuge	Hillsborough County	FL	1974	450 acres (1.8 km^{2})
Everglades Headwaters National Wildlife Refuge and Conservation Area	Hardee County; Highlands County; Polk County	FL	1991	900 acres (3.6 km^{2})
Florida Panther National Wildlife Refuge	Collier County	FL	1989	26,400 acres (107 km^{2})
Great White Heron National Wildlife Refuge	Monroe County	FL	1938	130,187 acres (526.85 km^{2})
Hobe Sound National Wildlife Refuge	Martin County	FL	1969	1,035 acres (4.19 km^{2})
Island Bay National Wildlife Refuge	Charlotte County	FL	1908	20 acres (0.081 km^{2})
J.N. 'Ding' Darling National Wildlife Refuge	Lee County	FL	1976	5,200 acres (21 km^{2})
Key Deer National Wildlife Refuge	Monroe County	FL	1957	8,542 acres (34.57 km^{2})
Key West National Wildlife Refuge	Monroe County	FL	1908	189,497 acres (766.87 km^{2})
Lake Wales Ridge National Wildlife Refuge	Highlands County; Polk County	FL	1990	1,194 acres (4.83 km^{2})
Lake Woodruff National Wildlife Refuge	Lake County; Volusia County	FL	1964	21,574 acres (87.31 km^{2})
Lower Suwannee National Wildlife Refuge	Dixie County; Levy County	FL	1979	53,000 acres (210 km^{2})
Matlacha Pass National Wildlife Refuge	Lee County	FL	1908	538 acres (2.18 km^{2})
Merritt Island National Wildlife Refuge	Brevard County	FL	1963	140,000 acres (570 km^{2})
Passage Key National Wildlife Refuge	Manatee County	FL	1905	64 acres (0.26 km^{2})
Pelican Island National Wildlife Refuge	Indian River County	FL	1903-First National Wildlife Refuge in U.S.	5,376 acres (21.76 km^{2})
Pine Island National Wildlife Refuge	Lee County	FL	1908	601 acres (2.43 km^{2})
Pinellas National Wildlife Refuge	Pinellas County	FL	1951	394 acres (1.59 km^{2})
St. Johns National Wildlife Refuge	Brevard County	FL	1971	6,255 acres (25.31 km^{2})
St. Marks National Wildlife Refuge	Jefferson County; Taylor County; Wakulla County	FL	1931	68,000 acres (280 km^{2})
St. Vincent National Wildlife Refuge	Franklin County; Gulf County	FL	1968	12,490 acres (50.5 km^{2})
Ten Thousand Islands National Wildlife Refuge	Collier County; Monroe County	FL	1996	35,000 acres (140 km^{2})
Banks Lake National Wildlife Refuge	Lanier County	GA	1985	4,049 acres (16.39 km^{2})
Blackbeard Island National Wildlife Refuge (Part of the Savannah Coastal Refuges Complex)	McIntosh County	GA	1924	5,618 acres (22.74 km^{2})
Bond Swamp National Wildlife Refuge	Bibb County; Twiggs County	GA	1989	6,500 acres (26 km^{2})
Harris Neck National Wildlife Refuge (Part of the Savannah Coastal Refuges Complex)	McIntosh County	GA	1962	2,762 acres (11.18 km^{2})
Okefenokee National Wildlife Refuge	Primarily in Charlton and Ware Counties, Georgia and Baker County, Florida	GA	1937	402,000 acres (1,630 km^{2})
Piedmont National Wildlife Refuge	Jasper County; Jones County	GA	1939	35,000 acres (140 km^{2})
Savannah National Wildlife Refuge*	Chatham and Effingham Counties, Georgia and Jasper County, South Carolina	GA	1927	29,175 acres (118.07 km^{2})
Wassaw National Wildlife Refuge (Part of the Savannah Coastal Refuges Complex)	Chatham County	GA	1969	10,053 acres (40.68 km^{2})
Wolf Island National Wildlife Refuge (Part of the Savannah Coastal Refuges Complex)	McIntosh County	GA	1930	5,126 acres (20.74 km^{2})
Guam National Wildlife Refuge	Guam	GU	1993	1,203 acres (4.87 km^{2})
Hakalau Forest National Wildlife Refuge	Island of Hawaiʻi	HI	1985	38,047 acres (153.97 km^{2})
Hanalei National Wildlife Refuge	Island of Kauaʻi	HI	1972	917 acres (3.71 km^{2})
Hawaiian Islands National Wildlife Refuge	Hawaiʻi	HI	1909	245,000 acres (990 km^{2})
Hulē‘ia National Wildlife Refuge	Island of Kauaʻi	HI	1973	241 acres (0.98 km^{2})
James Campbell National Wildlife Refuge	Island of Oʻahu	HI	1976	1,100 acres (4.5 km^{2})
Kakahai‘a National Wildlife Refuge	Island of Molokaʻi	HI	1977	44 acres (0.18 km^{2})
Kealia Pond National Wildlife Refuge	Island of Maui	HI	1992	700 acres (2.8 km^{2})
Kilauea Point National Wildlife Refuge	Island of Kauaʻi	HI	1985	203 acres (0.82 km^{2})
Oahu Forest National Wildlife Refuge	Island of Oʻahu	HI	2000	4,525 acres (18.31 km^{2})
Pearl Harbor National Wildlife Refuge	Island of Oʻahu	HI	1972	63 acres (0.25 km^{2})
Bear Lake National Wildlife Refuge (Part of the Southeast Idaho National Wildlife Refuge Complex)	Bear Lake County	ID	1968	19,000 acres (77 km^{2})
Camas National Wildlife Refuge (Part of the Southeast Idaho National Wildlife Refuge Complex)	Jefferson County	ID	1937	10,578 acres (42.81 km^{2})
Deer Flat National Wildlife Refuge	Canyon County; Owyhee County; Payette County; Washington County; Malheur County, Oregon; Baker County, Oregon	ID	1909	10,548 acres (42.69 km^{2})
Grays Lake National Wildlife Refuge (Part of the Southeast Idaho National Wildlife Refuge Complex)	Bonneville County; Caribou County	ID	1965	19,400 acres (79 km^{2})
Kootenai National Wildlife Refuge	Boundary County	ID	1964	2,774 acres (11.23 km^{2})
Minidoka National Wildlife Refuge (Part of the Southeast Idaho National Wildlife Refuge Complex)	Blaine County; Cassia County; Minidoka County; Power County	ID	1909	20,751 acres (83.98 km^{2})
Oxford Slough Waterfowl Production Area	Bannock County; Franklin County	ID	1985	1,878 acres (7.60 km^{2})
Chautauqua National Wildlife Refuge	Mason County	IL	1936	4,388 acres (17.76 km^{2})
Crab Orchard National Wildlife Refuge	Jackson County; Union County; Williamson County	IL	1947	43,890 acres (177.6 km^{2})
Cypress Creek National Wildlife Refuge	Alexander County; Johnson County; Pulaski County; Union County	IL	1990	16,000 acres (65 km^{2})
Emiquon National Wildlife Refuge	Fulton County	IL	1993	11,122 acres (45.01 km^{2})
Hackmatack National Wildlife Refuge	McHenry County; Walworth County, Wisconsin	IL	2012	11,200 acres (45 km^{2})
Kankakee National Wildlife Refuge and Conservation Area	Iroquois County	IL	2016	66 acres (0.27 km^{2})
Meredosia National Wildlife Refuge	Cass County; Morgan County	IL	1973	5,255 acres (21.27 km^{2})
Middle Mississippi River National Wildlife Refuge	Illinois; Missouri	IL	2000	7,000 acres (28 km^{2})
Two Rivers National Wildlife Refuge	Illinois; Missouri	IL	1958	8,501 acres (34.40 km^{2})
Big Oaks National Wildlife Refuge	Jefferson County; Jennings County; Ripley County	IN	2000	50,000 acres (200 km^{2})
Muscatatuck National Wildlife Refuge	Jackson County; Jennings County; Monroe County	IN	1966	7,880 acres (31.9 km^{2})
Patoka River National Wildlife Refuge and Management Area	Gibson County; Pike County	IN	1994	23,962 acres (96.97 km^{2})
DeSoto National Wildlife Refuge	Harrison County; Pottawattamie County; Washington County, Nebraska	IA	1958	8,362 acres (33.84 km^{2})
Driftless Area National Wildlife Refuge	Iowa; Illinois; Wisconsin	IA	1989	911 acres (3.69 km^{2})
Iowa Wetland Management District	Covers 15 counties	IA		25,000 acres (100 km^{2}); 75 waterfowl production areas
Neal Smith National Wildlife Refuge	Jasper County	IA	1990	8,654 acres (35.02 km^{2})
Port Louisa National Wildlife Refuge	Louisa County; Mercer County, Illinois	IA	1958	1,078 acres (4.36 km^{2})
Union Slough National Wildlife Refuge	Kossuth County	IA	1938	3,334 acres (13.49 km^{2})
Flint Hills National Wildlife Refuge	Coffey County; Lyon County	KS	1966	18,463 acres (74.72 km^{2})
Kirwin National Wildlife Refuge	Phillips County	KS	1954	10,778 acres (43.62 km^{2})
Marais des Cygnes National Wildlife Refuge	Linn County	KS	1992	7,500 acres (30 km^{2})
Quivira National Wildlife Refuge	Reno County; Rice County; Stafford County	KS	1955	22,135 acres (89.58 km^{2})
Clarks River National Wildlife Refuge	Graves County; Marshall County; McCracken County	KY	1997	8,040 acres (32.5 km^{2})
Green River National Wildlife Refuge	Henderson County	KY	2019	10 acres (0.040 km^{2})
Atchafalaya National Wildlife Refuge	Iberville Parish; St. Martin Parish	LA	1986	15,220 acres (61.6 km^{2})
Bayou Cocodrie National Wildlife Refuge	Concordia Parish	LA	1992	13,200 acres (53 km^{2})
Bayou Sauvage National Wildlife Refuge	New Orleans	LA	1990	22,770 acres (92.1 km^{2})
Bayou Teche National Wildlife Refuge	St. Mary Parish	LA	2001	9,028 acres (36.54 km^{2})
Big Branch Marsh National Wildlife Refuge	St. Tammany Parish	LA	2001	24,000 acres (97 km^{2})
Black Bayou Lake National Wildlife Refuge	Ouachita Parish	LA	1997	4,200 acres (17 km^{2})
Bogue Chitto National Wildlife Refuge	St. Tammany and Washington Parishes, Louisiana and Pearl River County, Mississippi	LA	1980	40,000 acres (160 km^{2})
Breton National Wildlife Refuge	St. Bernard Parish; Plaquemines Parish	LA	1904	13,000 acres (53 km^{2})
Cameron Prairie National Wildlife Refuge	Cameron Parish	LA	1986	9,621 acres (38.93 km^{2})
Cat Island National Wildlife Refuge	West Feliciana Parish	LA	2000	9,623 acres (38.94 km^{2})
Catahoula National Wildlife Refuge	Catahoula Parish; LaSalle Parish	LA	1958	25,162 acres (101.83 km^{2})
D'Arbonne National Wildlife Refuge	Ouachita Parish; Union Parish	LA	1986	-
Delta National Wildlife Refuge	Plaquemines Parish	LA	1935	49,000 acres (200 km^{2})
Grand Cote National Wildlife Refuge	Avoyelles Parish	LA	1989	6,077 acres (24.59 km^{2})
East Cove National Wildlife Refuge	Cameron Parish	LA	1937	14,927 acres (60.41 km^{2})
Handy Brake National Wildlife Refuge	Morehouse Parish	LA	1988	501 acres (2.03 km^{2})
Lacassine National Wildlife Refuge	Cameron Parish; Evangeline Parish	LA	1937	35,000 acres (140 km^{2})
Lake Ophelia National Wildlife Refuge	Avoyelles Parish	LA	1988	17,500 acres (71 km^{2})
Louisiana Wetland Management District	20 parishes in northern Louisiana	LA	1990	25,710 acres (104.0 km^{2})
Mandalay National Wildlife Refuge	Terrebonne Parish	LA	1996	4,416 acres (17.87 km^{2})
Red River National Wildlife Refuge	Bossier Parish; Caddo Parish; DeSoto Parish; Natchitoches Parish; Red River Parish	LA	2001	50,000 acres (200 km^{2})
Sabine National Wildlife Refuge	Cameron Parish	LA	1937	125,790 acres (509.1 km^{2})
Shell Keys National Wildlife Refuge	Iberia Parish	LA	1907	-
Tensas River National Wildlife Refuge	Franklin Parish; Madison Parish; Tensas Parish	LA	1998	64,012 acres (259.05 km^{2})
Upper Ouachita National Wildlife Refuge	Morehouse Parish; Union Parish	LA	1978	41,430 acres (167.7 km^{2})
Aroostook National Wildlife Refuge	Aroostook County	ME	1998	5,252 acres (21.25 km^{2})
Carlton Pond Waterfowl Production Area	Waldo County	ME	1966	1,055 acres (4.27 km^{2})
Cross Island National Wildlife Refuge (Part of Maine Coastal Islands National Wildlife Refuge)	Washington County	ME	1980	1,700 acres (6.9 km^{2})
Franklin Island National Wildlife Refuge (Part of Maine Coastal Islands National Wildlife Refuge)	Knox County	ME	1973	12 acres (0.049 km^{2})
Moosehorn National Wildlife Refuge	Washington County	ME	1937	28,751 acres (116.35 km^{2})
Petit Manan National Wildlife Refuge (Part of Maine Coastal Islands National Wildlife Refuge)	Hancock County; Washington County	ME	1974	6,367 acres (25.77 km^{2})
Pond Island National Wildlife Refuge (Part of Maine Coastal Islands National Wildlife Refuge)	Sagadahoc County	ME	1973	10 acres (0.040 km^{2})
Rachel Carson National Wildlife Refuge	Cumberland County; York County	ME	1966	9,125 acres (36.93 km^{2})
Seal Island National Wildlife Refuge (Part of Maine Coastal Islands National Wildlife Refuge)	Knox County	ME	1972	65 acres (0.26 km^{2})
Sunkhaze Meadows National Wildlife Refuge	Penobscot County	ME	1988	11,435 acres (46.28 km^{2})
Blackwater National Wildlife Refuge (Part of Chesapeake Marshlands National Wildlife Refuge Complex)	Dorchester County	MD	1933	28,894.35 acres (116.9313 km^{2})
Eastern Neck National Wildlife Refuge (Part of Chesapeake Marshlands National Wildlife Refuge Complex)	Kent County	MD	1962	2,285 acres (9.25 km^{2})
Glenn Martin National Wildlife Refuge (Part of Chesapeake Marshlands National Wildlife Refuge Complex)	Somerset County; Accomack County, Virginia	MD	1954	4,548 acres (18.41 km^{2})
Patuxent Research Refuge	Anne Arundel County; Prince George's County	MD	1936	12,800 acres (52 km^{2})
Susquehanna River National Wildlife Refuge (Part of Chesapeake Marshlands National Wildlife Refuge Complex)	Harford County	MD	1944	3.79 acres (0.0153 km^{2})
Assabet River National Wildlife Refuge	Sudbury	MA	2005	2,230 acres (9.0 km^{2})
Great Meadows National Wildlife Refuge	Sudbury	MA	1944	250 acres (1.0 km^{2})
Mashpee National Wildlife Refuge	Mashpee	MA	1995	341.65 acres (1.3826 km^{2})
Massasoit National Wildlife Refuge	Plymouth	MA	1983	195 acres (0.79 km^{2})
Monomoy National Wildlife Refuge	Barnstable County	MA	1944	7,604 acres (30.77 km^{2})
Nantucket National Wildlife Refuge	Nantucket	MA	1973	24 acres (0.097 km^{2})
Nomans Land Island National Wildlife Refuge	Nomans Land	MA	1998	640 acres (2.6 km^{2})
Oxbow National Wildlife Refuge	Middlesex County; Worcester County	MA	1974	1,667 acres (6.75 km^{2})
Parker River National Wildlife Refuge	Plum Island	MA	1942	4,662 acres (18.87 km^{2})
Silvio O. Conte National Fish and Wildlife Refuge	Massachusetts; Connecticut; New Hampshire; Vermont	MA	1997	31,216 acres (126.33 km^{2})
Thacher Island National Wildlife Refuge	Thacher Island	MA	1972	22 acres (0.089 km^{2})
Detroit River International Wildlife Refuge	Detroit River; Lake Erie	MI	2001	5,868 acres (23.75 km^{2})
Harbor Island National Wildlife Refuge	Lake Huron	MI	1983	695 acres (2.81 km^{2})
Huron National Wildlife Refuge	Lake Superior	MI	1905	147 acres (0.59 km^{2})
Kirtland's Warbler Wildlife Management Area	Lower Peninsula of Michigan	MI	1980	6,684 acres (27.05 km^{2})
Michigan Islands National Wildlife Refuge	Lake Michigan; Lake Huron	MI	1943	744 acres (3.01 km^{2})
Michigan Wetland Management District	Lower Peninsula of Michigan	MI	1980	664 acres (2.69 km^{2})
Seney National Wildlife Refuge	Schoolcraft County	MI	1935	95,265 acres (385.52 km^{2})
Shiawassee National Wildlife Refuge	Saginaw County	MI	1953	9,870 acres (39.9 km^{2})
Agassiz National Wildlife Refuge	Marshall County	MN	1937	61,500 acres (249 km^{2})
Big Stone National Wildlife Refuge	Big Stone County; Lac qui Parle County	MN	1975	11,586 acres (46.89 km^{2})
Big Stone Wetland Management District	Lincoln County; Lyon County	MN	1975	3,000 acres (12 km^{2})
Crane Meadows National Wildlife Refuge	Morrison County	MN	1992	13,540 acres (54.8 km^{2})
Detroit Lakes Wetland Management District	Northwestern Minnesota	MN	1953	53,000 acres (210 km^{2})
Fergus Falls Wetland Management District	West Central Minnesota	MN	1962	72,699 acres (294.20 km^{2})
Glacial Ridge National Wildlife Refuge	Polk County	MN	2004	37,756 acres (152.79 km^{2})
Hamden Slough National Wildlife Refuge	Becker County	MN	1989	5,944 acres (24.05 km^{2})
Litchfield Wetland Management District	Central Minnesota	MN	1978	36,000 acres (150 km^{2})
Mille Lacs National Wildlife Refuge	Mille Lacs County	MN	1915	0.57 acres (0.0023 km^{2})
Minnesota Valley National Wildlife Refuge	Carver County; Dakota County; Hennepin County; Le Sueur County; Scott County; Sibley County	MN	1976	14,000 acres (57 km^{2})
Minnesota Valley Wetland Management District	Southeastern Minnesota	MN	1988	8,000 acres (32 km^{2})
Morris Wetland Management District	West Central Minnesota	MN		50,000 acres (200 km^{2})
Northern Tallgrass Prairie National Wildlife Refuge	Minnesota; Iowa	MN	2000	5,000 acres (20 km^{2})
Rice Lake National Wildlife Refuge	Aitkin County	MN	1935	18,208 acres (73.69 km^{2})
Rydell National Wildlife Refuge	Polk County	MN	1992	2,120 acres (8.6 km^{2})
Sherburne National Wildlife Refuge	Sherburne County	MN	1965	30,700 acres (124 km^{2})
Tamarac National Wildlife Refuge	Becker County	MN	1938	42,724 acres (172.90 km^{2})
Upper Mississippi River National Wildlife and Fish Refuge	Upper Mississippi River in: Illinois; Iowa; Minnesota; Wisconsin	MN	1924	240,000 acres (970 km^{2})
Windom Wetland Management District	South Central Minnesota	MN	-	14,000 acres (57 km^{2})
Coldwater River National Wildlife Refuge	Quitman County; Tallahatchie County	MS	2000	2,069 acres (8.37 km^{2})
Dahomey National Wildlife Refuge	Bolivar County	MS	1990	9,691 acres (39.22 km^{2})
Grand Bay National Wildlife Refuge	Jackson County; Mobile County, Alabama	MS	1992	32,000 acres (130 km^{2})
Hillside National Wildlife Refuge	Holmes County	MS	1975	15,572 acres (63.02 km^{2})
Holt Collier National Wildlife Refuge	Washington County	MS	2004	1,400 acres (5.7 km^{2})
Mathews Brake National Wildlife Refuge	Leflore County	MS	1980	2,418 acres (9.79 km^{2})
Mississippi Sandhill Crane National Wildlife Refuge	Jackson County	MS	1975	19,000 acres (77 km^{2})
Morgan Brake National Wildlife Refuge	Holmes County	MS	1977	7,383 acres (29.88 km^{2})
Panther Swamp National Wildlife Refuge	Yazoo County	MS	1978	38,697 acres (156.60 km^{2})
Sam D. Hamilton Noxubee National Wildlife Refuge	Noxubee County; Oktibbeha County; Winston County	MS	1940	48,000 acres (190 km^{2})
St. Catherine Creek National Wildlife Refuge	Adams County	MS	1990	34,256 acres (138.63 km^{2})
Tallahatchie National Wildlife Refuge	Grenada County; Tallahatchie County	MS	1990	4,199 acres (16.99 km^{2})
Theodore Roosevelt National Wildlife Refuge	Holmes County; Humphreys County; Leflore County; Sharkey County; Warren County; Washington County	MS	2004	-
Yazoo National Wildlife Refuge	Washington County	MS	1936	12,941 acres (52.37 km^{2})
Big Muddy National Fish and Wildlife Refuge	Missouri River	MO	1994	16,700 acres (68 km^{2})
Clarence Cannon National Wildlife Refuge	Pike County	MO	1964	3,750 acres (15.2 km^{2})
Great River National Wildlife Refuge	Clark County; Lewis County; Adams County, Illinois; Pike County, Illinois	MO	1958	11,600 acres (47 km^{2})
Loess Bluffs National Wildlife Refuge	Holt County	MO	1935	7,415 acres (30.01 km^{2})
Mingo National Wildlife Refuge	Stoddard County; Wayne County	MO	1944	21,676 acres (87.72 km^{2})
Ozark Cavefish National Wildlife Refuge	Lawrence County	MO	1991	40 acres (0.16 km^{2})
Pilot Knob National Wildlife Refuge	Iron County	MO	1987	90 acres (0.36 km^{2})
Swan Lake National Wildlife Refuge	Chariton County	MO	1937	10,795 acres (43.69 km^{2})
Benton Lake National Wildlife Refuge	Cascade County	MT	1929	12,459 acres (50.42 km^{2})
Benton Lake Wetland Management District	Montana	MT	1975	16,000 acres (65 km^{2})
Black Coulee National Wildlife Refuge	Blaine County	MT	1938	1,308 acres (5.29 km^{2})
Bowdoin National Wildlife Refuge	Phillips County	MT	1936	15,551 acres (62.93 km^{2})
Charles M. Russell National Wildlife Refuge	Fergus County; Garfield County; McCone County; Petroleum County; Phillips County; Valley County	MT	1936	915,814 acres (3,706.17 km^{2})
Creedman Coulee National Wildlife Refuge	Hill County	MT	1941	2,728 acres (11.04 km^{2})
Grass Lake National Wildlife Refuge (formerly Halfbreed Lake NWR)	Stillwater County	MT	1987	4,318 acres (17.47 km^{2})
Hailstone National Wildlife Refuge	Stillwater County	MT	1942	2,700 acres (11 km^{2})
Hewitt Lake National Wildlife Refuge	Phillips County	MT	1938	1,360 acres (5.5 km^{2})
Lake Mason National Wildlife Refuge	Musselshell County	MT	1941	16,814 acres (68.04 km^{2})
Lake Thibadeau National Wildlife Refuge	Hill County	MT	1937	3,868 acres (15.65 km^{2})
Lamesteer National Wildlife Refuge	Wibaux County	MT	1942	800 acres (3.2 km^{2})
Lee Metcalf National Wildlife Refuge	Ravalli County	MT	1964	2,800 acres (11 km^{2})
Lost Trail National Wildlife Refuge	Flathead County	MT	1999	8,834 acres (35.75 km^{2})
Medicine Lake National Wildlife Refuge	Sheridan County; Roosevelt County	MT	1935	31,533 acres (127.61 km^{2})
Ninepipe National Wildlife Refuge	Lake County	MT	1921	4,027 acres (16.30 km^{2})
Northwest Montana Wetland Management District	Montana	MT	1970	14,752 acres (59.70 km^{2})
Pablo National Wildlife Refuge	Lake County	MT	1921	2,473 acres (10.01 km^{2})
Red Rock Lakes National Wildlife Refuge	Beaverhead County	MT	1932	65,810 acres (266.3 km^{2})
Swan River National Wildlife Refuge	Lake County	MT	1973	1,568 acres (6.35 km^{2})
UL Bend National Wildlife Refuge	Phillips County	MT	1969	56,048 acres (226.82 km^{2})
War Horse National Wildlife Refuge	Petroleum County	MT	1958	3,392 acres (13.73 km^{2})
Boyer Chute National Wildlife Refuge	Washington County	NE	1992	4,040 acres (16.3 km^{2})
Crescent Lake National Wildlife Refuge	Garden County	NE	1931	45,818 acres (185.42 km^{2})
Fort Niobrara National Wildlife Refuge	Cherry County	NE	1912	19,131 acres (77.42 km^{2})
John and Louise Seier National Wildlife Refuge	Rock County	NE	1999	2,400 acres (9.7 km^{2})
North Platte National Wildlife Refuge	Scotts Bluff County	NE	1916	5,047 acres (20.42 km^{2})
Rainwater Basin Wetland Management District	South Central Nebraska	NE	1963	22,864 acres (92.53 km^{2})
Valentine National Wildlife Refuge	Cherry County	NE	1935	71,516 acres (289.41 km^{2})
Anaho Island National Wildlife Refuge	Washoe County	NV	1913	247 acres (1.00 km^{2})
Ash Meadows National Wildlife Refuge (Managed as part of the Desert National Wildlife Refuge Complex, headquartered in Las Vegas)	Nye County	NV	1984	23,000 acres (93 km^{2})
Desert National Wildlife Refuge (Managed as part of the Desert National Wildlife Refuge Complex, headquartered in Las Vegas)	Clark County; Lincoln County	NV	1936	1,615,000 acres (6,540 km^{2})
Fallon National Wildlife Refuge	Churchill County	NV	1931	15,000 acres (61 km^{2})
Moapa Valley National Wildlife Refuge (Managed as part of the Desert National Wildlife Refuge Complex, headquartered in Las Vegas)	Clark County	NV	1979	106 acres (0.43 km^{2})
Pahranagat National Wildlife Refuge (Managed as part of the Desert National Wildlife Refuge Complex, headquartered in Las Vegas)	Lincoln County	NV	1963	5,380 acres (21.8 km^{2})
Ruby Lake National Wildlife Refuge	Elko County; White Pine County	NV	1938	37,632 acres (152.29 km^{2})
Sheldon National Wildlife Refuge (Managed as part of the Sheldon-Hart Mountain National Wildlife Refuge Complex, headquartered in Lakeview, Oregon)	Humboldt County; Washoe County; Lake County, Oregon	NV	1931	573,504 acres (2,320.89 km^{2})
Stillwater National Wildlife Refuge	Churchill County	NV	1949	79,570 acres (322.0 km^{2})
Great Bay National Wildlife Refuge	Rockingham County	NH	1992	1,116 acres (4.52 km^{2})
John Hay National Wildlife Refuge	Merrimack County	NH	1987	164 acres (0.66 km^{2})
Umbagog National Wildlife Refuge	Coös County; Oxford County, Maine	NH	1992	25,650 acres (103.8 km^{2})
Wapack National Wildlife Refuge	Hillsborough County	NH	1972	1,672 acres (6.77 km^{2})
Cape May National Wildlife Refuge	Cape May County	NJ	1989	21,200 acres (86 km^{2})
Edwin B. Forsythe National Wildlife Refuge	Atlantic County; Ocean County	NJ	1984	47,437 acres (191.97 km^{2})
Great Swamp National Wildlife Refuge	Morris County	NJ	1960	7,800 acres (32 km^{2})
Supawna Meadows National Wildlife Refuge	Salem County	NJ	1974	3,230 acres (13.1 km^{2})
Wallkill River National Wildlife Refuge	Sussex County; Orange County, New York	NJ	1990	5,100 acres (21 km^{2})
Bitter Lake National Wildlife Refuge	Chaves County	NM	1937	24,563 acres (99.40 km^{2})
Bosque del Apache National Wildlife Refuge	Socorro County	NM	1939	57,331 acres (232.01 km^{2})
Grulla National Wildlife Refuge	Roosevelt County; Bailey County, Texas	NM	1969	3,264 acres (13.21 km^{2})
Las Vegas National Wildlife Refuge (Managed as part of the Northern New Mexico National Wildlife Refuge Complex)	San Miguel County	NM	1965	8,672 acres (35.09 km^{2})
Rio Mora National Wildlife Refuge (Managed as part of the Northern New Mexico National Wildlife Refuge Complex)	Mora County	NM	2012	4,224 acres (17.09 km^{2})
Maxwell National Wildlife Refuge (Managed as part of the Northern New Mexico National Wildlife Refuge Complex)	Colfax County	NM	1965	3,699 acres (14.97 km^{2})
San Andres National Wildlife Refuge	Doña Ana County	NM	1941	57,215 acres (231.54 km^{2})
Sevilleta National Wildlife Refuge	Socorro County	NM	1973	230,000 acres (930 km^{2})
Valle de Oro National Wildlife Refuge	Bernalillo County	NM	2012	570 acres (2.3 km^{2})
Amagansett National Wildlife Refuge (Part of the Long Island National Wildlife Refuge Complex)	Suffolk County	NY	1968	36 acres (0.15 km^{2})
Conscience Point National Wildlife Refuge (Part of the Long Island National Wildlife Refuge Complex)	Suffolk County	NY	1971	60 acres (0.24 km^{2})
Elizabeth A. Morton National Wildlife Refuge (Part of the Long Island National Wildlife Refuge Complex)	Suffolk County	NY	1954	187 acres (0.76 km^{2})
Iroquois National Wildlife Refuge	Genesee County; Orleans County	NY	1958	10,828 acres (43.82 km^{2})
Montezuma National Wildlife Refuge	Seneca County	NY	1937	10,004 acres (40.48 km^{2})
Oyster Bay National Wildlife Refuge (Part of the Long Island National Wildlife Refuge Complex)	Nassau County	NY	1968	3,209 acres (12.99 km^{2})
Sayville National Wildlife Refuge (Part of the Long Island National Wildlife Refuge Complex)	Suffolk County	NY	1992	127 acres (0.51 km^{2})
Seatuck National Wildlife Refuge (Part of the Long Island National Wildlife Refuge Complex)	Suffolk County	NY	1968	196 acres (0.79 km^{2})
Shawangunk Grasslands National Wildlife Refuge	Ulster County	NY	1999	597 acres (2.42 km^{2})
Target Rock National Wildlife Refuge (Part of the Long Island National Wildlife Refuge Complex)	Suffolk County	NY	1967	80 acres (0.32 km^{2})
Wertheim National Wildlife Refuge (Part of the Long Island National Wildlife Refuge Complex)	Suffolk County	NY	1947	2,550 acres (10.3 km^{2})
Alligator River National Wildlife Refuge (Part of the North Carolina Coastal Plain National Wildlife Refuge Complex)	Dare County; Hyde County	NC	1984	152,000 acres (620 km^{2})
Cedar Island National Wildlife Refuge (Part of the Mattamuskeet, Swanquarter and Cedar Island National Wildlife Refuge Complex)	Carteret County	NC	1964	14,480 acres (58.6 km^{2})
Currituck National Wildlife Refuge (Part of the North Carolina Coastal Plain National Wildlife Refuge Complex)	Currituck County	NC	1984	8,316 acres (33.65 km^{2})
Mackay Island National Wildlife Refuge (Part of the North Carolina Coastal Plain National Wildlife Refuge Complex)	Currituck County; Virginia Beach, Virginia	NC	1960	8,231 acres (33.31 km^{2})
Mattamuskeet National Wildlife Refuge (Part of the Mattamuskeet, Swanquarter and Cedar Island National Wildlife Refuge Complex)	Hyde County	NC	1934	50,173 acres (203.04 km^{2})
Mountain Bogs National Wildlife Refuge	Ashe County	NC	2015	39 acres (0.16 km^{2})
Pea Island National Wildlife Refuge (Part of the North Carolina Coastal Plain National Wildlife Refuge Complex)	Dare County	NC	1938	31,534 acres (127.61 km^{2})
Pee Dee National Wildlife Refuge	Anson County; Richmond County	NC	1963	8,443 acres (34.17 km^{2})
Pocosin Lakes National Wildlife Refuge (Part of the North Carolina Coastal Plain National Wildlife Refuge Complex)	Hyde County; Tyrrell County; Washington County	NC	1963	110,106 acres (445.58 km^{2})
Roanoke River National Wildlife Refuge (Part of the North Carolina Coastal Plain National Wildlife Refuge Complex)	Bertie County	NC	1989	20,978 acres (84.89 km^{2})
Swanquarter National Wildlife Refuge (Part of the Mattamuskeet, Swanquarter and Cedar Island National Wildlife Refuge Complex)	Hyde County	NC	1932	16,411 acres (66.41 km^{2})
Appert Lake National Wildlife Refuge	Emmons County	ND	1930s	1,978 acres (8.00 km^{2}); Easement on private land
Ardoch National Wildlife Refuge (Managed by the Devils Lake Wetland Management District)	Walsh County	ND	1939	3,084 acres (12.48 km^{2}); Easement on private land
Arrowwood National Wildlife Refuge (Managed by the Arrowwood National Wildlife Refuge Complex)	Stutsman County	ND	1935	15,934 acres (64.48 km^{2})
Arrowwood Wetland Management District (Managed by the Arrowwood National Wildlife Refuge Complex)	Eddy County; Foster County	ND	1961	6,162 acres (24.94 km^{2})
Audubon National Wildlife Refuge (Managed by the Audubon National Wildlife Refuge Complex)	McLean County	ND	1956 (renamed 1967)	14,735 acres (59.63 km^{2})
Audubon Wetland Management District (Managed by the Audubon National Wildlife Refuge Complex)	McLean County; Sheridan County	ND	1950s	155,000 acres (630 km^{2}); 84 waterfowl production areas
Bone Hill National Wildlife Refuge	LaMoure County	ND	1939	1,978 acres (8.00 km^{2}); Easement on private land
Brumba National Wildlife Refuge	Towner County	ND	1939	Easement on private land
Buffalo Lake National Wildlife Refuge (North Dakota)	Pierce County	ND		Easement on private land
Camp Lake National Wildlife Refuge	McLean County	ND		585 acres (2.37 km^{2}); Easement on private land
Canfield Lake National Wildlife Refuge	Burleigh County	ND		1,978 acres (8.00 km^{2}); Easement on private land
Chase Lake National Wildlife Refuge (Managed by the Arrowwood National Wildlife Refuge Complex)	Stutsman County	ND	1908	4,385 acres (17.75 km^{2})
Chase Lake Wetland Management District (Managed by the Arrowwood National Wildlife Refuge Complex)	Stutsman County; Wells County	ND	1993	162,925 acres (659.33 km^{2}); 135 waterfowl production areas
Cottonwood Lake National Wildlife Refuge	McHenry County	ND	1939	Easement on private land
Crosby Wetland Management District (Managed by the Lostwood Wetland Management District Complex)	Burke County; Divide County; Williams County	ND	1962	21,219 acres (85.87 km^{2}); 90 waterfowl production areas
Dakota Lake National Wildlife Refuge	Dickey County	ND	1939	2,784 acres (11.27 km^{2}); Easement on private land
Des Lacs National Wildlife Refuge (Managed by the Lostwood Wetland Management District Complex)	Burke County; Ward County	ND	1935	19,500 acres (79 km^{2})
Devils Lake Wetland Management District (Managed by the Devils Lake Wetland Management District)	Benson County; Cavalier County; Grand Forks County; Pembina County; Ramsey County; Towner County; Walsh County	ND		258,000 acres (1,040 km^{2}); 257 waterfowl production areas
Florence Lake National Wildlife Refuge (Managed by the Long Lake National Wildlife Refuge Complex)	Burleigh County	ND	1939	1,888.2 acres (7.641 km^{2})
Half-Way Lake National Wildlife Refuge	Stutsman County	ND	1939	160 acres (0.65 km^{2}); Easement on private land
Hiddenwood National Wildlife Refuge	McLean County	ND	1939	675 acres (2.73 km^{2}); Easement on private land
Hobart Lake National Wildlife Refuge	Barnes County	ND	1939	2,077 acres (8.41 km^{2}); Easement on private land
Hutchinson Lake National Wildlife Refuge	Kidder County	ND		Easement on private land
J. Clark Salyer National Wildlife Refuge (Managed by the J. Clark Salyer National Wildlife Refuge Complex)	Bottineau County; McHenry County	ND	1935	58,700 acres (238 km^{2})
J. Clark Salyer Wetland Management District (Managed by the J. Clark Salyer National Wildlife Refuge Complex)	Bottineau County; McHenry County; Pierce County; Renville County; Rolette County	ND	1966	185,090 acres (749.0 km^{2})
Johnson Lake National Wildlife Refuge	Eddy County; Nelson County	ND	1939	2,002 acres (8.10 km^{2}); Easement on private land
Kellys Slough National Wildlife Refuge (Managed by the Devils Lake Wetland Management District)	Grand Forks County	ND	1936	2,146 acres (8.68 km^{2})
Kulm Wetland Management District	Dickey County; LaMoure County; Logan County; McIntosh County	ND	1971	279,184 acres (1,129.82 km^{2}); 200 waterfowl production areas
Lake Alice National Wildlife Refuge (Managed by the Devils Lake Wetland Management District)	Ramsey County	ND	1935	8,512 acres (34.45 km^{2})
Lake George National Wildlife Refuge	Stutsman County	ND	1939	Easement on private land
Lake Ilo National Wildlife Refuge (Managed by the Audubon National Wildlife Refuge Complex)	Dunn County	ND	1939	4,000 acres (16 km^{2})
Lake Nettie National Wildlife Refuge (Managed by the Audubon National Wildlife Refuge Complex)	McLean County	ND	1939	1,285 acres (5.20 km^{2})
Lake Otis National Wildlife Refuge	McLean County	ND		320 acres (1.3 km^{2}); Easement on private land
Lake Patricia National Wildlife Refuge	Morton County	ND	1939	800 acres (3.2 km^{2}); Easement on private land
Lake Zahl National Wildlife Refuge (Managed by the Lostwood Wetland Management District Complex)	Williams County	ND	1939	3,823 acres (15.47 km^{2})
Lambs Lake National Wildlife Refuge	Nelson County	ND	1939	Easement on private land
Little Goose National Wildlife Refuge	Grand Forks County	ND		Easement on private land
Long Lake National Wildlife Refuge (Managed by the Long Lake National Wildlife Refuge Complex)	Burleigh County	ND	1932	22,300 acres (90 km^{2})
Long Lake Wetland Management District (Managed by the Long Lake National Wildlife Refuge Complex)	Kidder County; Burleigh County; Emmons County	ND	1950s	100,000 acres (400 km^{2})
Lords Lake National Wildlife Refuge	Bottineau County	ND		Easement on private land
Lost Lake National Wildlife Refuge	McLean County	ND		960 acres (3.9 km^{2}); Easement on private land
Lostwood National Wildlife Refuge (Managed by the Lostwood Wetland Management District Complex)	Burke County; Mountrail County	ND	1940	27,589 acres (111.65 km^{2})
Lostwood Wetland Management District (Managed by the Lostwood Wetland Management District Complex)	Mountrail County; Ward County	ND	1961	Scattered small tracts
Maple River National Wildlife Refuge	Dickey County	ND	1939	414 acres (1.68 km^{2}) Federal land 1,120 acres (4.5 km^{2}) Easement on private land
McLean National Wildlife Refuge	McLean County	ND	1939 (as Lake Susie NWR)	760 acres (3.1 km^{2})
Pleasant Lake National Wildlife Refuge	Benson County	ND	1939	1,000 acres (4.0 km^{2}); Easement on private land
Pretty Rock National Wildlife Refuge	Grant County	ND	1941	800 acres (3.2 km^{2}); Easement on private land
Rabb Lake National Wildlife Refuge	Rolette County	ND		Easement on private land
Rock Lake National Wildlife Refuge	Towner County	ND	1939	Easement on private land
Rose Lake National Wildlife Refuge	Nelson County	ND	1948	872.1 acres (3.529 km^{2}); Easement on private land
School Section Lake National Wildlife Refuge	Rolette County	ND	1935	Easement on private land
Shell Lake National Wildlife Refuge (Managed by the Lostwood Wetland Management District Complex)	Mountrail County	ND	1939	1,835 acres (7.43 km^{2})
Sibley Lake National Wildlife Refuge	Griggs County	ND		1,077 acres (4.36 km^{2}); Easement on private land
Silver Lake National Wildlife Refuge	Benson County	ND	1938	398.76 acres (1.6137 km^{2}); Easement on private land
Slade National Wildlife Refuge (Managed by the Long Lake National Wildlife Refuge Complex)	Kidder County	ND	1940	3,000 acres (12 km^{2})
Snyder Lake National Wildlife Refuge	Towner County	ND	1941	Easement on private land
Springwater National Wildlife Refuge	Emmons County	ND		Easement on private land
Stewart Lake National Wildlife Refuge (Managed by the Audubon National Wildlife Refuge Complex)	Slope County	ND	1941	730 acres (3.0 km^{2}) federal land 1,600 acres (6.5 km^{2}) easement on private land
Stoney Slough National Wildlife Refuge	Barnes County	ND	1941	1,120 acres (4.5 km^{2}) Federal land 880 acres (3.6 km^{2}) Easement on private land
Storm Lake National Wildlife Refuge	Sargent County	ND		Easement on private land
Stump Lake National Wildlife Refuge	Nelson County	ND	1905	Currently under water
Sunburst Lake National Wildlife Refuge	Emmons County	ND		328 acres (1.33 km^{2}); Easement on private land
Tewaukon National Wildlife Refuge (Managed by the Souris River Basin National Wildlife Refuge Complex)	Sargent County	ND	1945	8,343 acres (33.76 km^{2})
Tewaukon Wetland Management District (Managed by the Tewaukon National Wildlife Refuge Complex)	Ransom County; Richland County; Sargent County	ND		49,000 acres (200 km^{2})
Tomahawk National Wildlife Refuge	Barnes County	ND		440 acres (1.8 km^{2}); Easement on private land
Upper Souris National Wildlife Refuge (Managed by the Souris River Basin National Wildlife Refuge Complex)	Renville County; Ward County	ND	1932	32,092 acres (129.87 km^{2})
Valley City Wetland Management District (Managed by the Arrowwood National Wildlife Refuge Complex)	Barnes County; Cass County; Griggs County; Steele County; Traill County	ND	1971	89,000 acres (360 km^{2}); 82 waterfowl production areas
White Lake National Wildlife Refuge (Managed by the Audubon National Wildlife Refuge Complex)	Slope County	ND	1941	1,040 acres (4.2 km^{2})
White Horse Hill National Game Preserve (Managed by the Devils Lake Wetland Management District)	Benson County	ND	1904	1,674 acres (6.77 km^{2})
Wild Rice Lake National Wildlife Refuge	Sargent County	ND		Easement on private land
Willow Lake National Wildlife Refuge	Rolette County	ND		Easement on private land
Wintering River National Wildlife Refuge	McHenry County	ND		Easement on private land
Wood Lake National Wildlife Refuge	Benson County	ND	1935	Easement on private land
Cedar Point National Wildlife Refuge (Managed by the Ottawa National Wildlife Refuge Complex)	Lucas County	OH	1965	2,449.77 acres (9.9139 km^{2})
Ottawa National Wildlife Refuge (Managed by the Ottawa National Wildlife Refuge Complex)	Lucas County; Ottawa County	OH	1961	6,857.91 acres (27.7530 km^{2})
West Sister Island National Wildlife Refuge (Managed by the Ottawa National Wildlife Refuge Complex)	Lucas County	OH	1937	77 acres (0.31 km^{2})
Deep Fork National Wildlife Refuge	Okmulgee County	OK	1993	9,748 acres (39.45 km^{2})
Little River National Wildlife Refuge	McCurtain County	OK	1987	13,660 acres (55.3 km^{2})
Optima National Wildlife Refuge	Texas County	OK	1975	4,333 acres (17.54 km^{2})
Ozark Plateau National Wildlife Refuge	Adair County; Cherokee County; Delaware County; Ottawa County	OK	1986	4,200 acres (17 km^{2})
Salt Plains National Wildlife Refuge	Alfalfa County	OK	1930	32,197 acres (130.30 km^{2})
Sequoyah National Wildlife Refuge	Haskell County; Muskogee County; Sequoyah County	OK	1970	20,800 acres (84 km^{2})
Tishomingo National Wildlife Refuge	Johnston County; Marshall County	OK	1946	16,464 acres (66.63 km^{2})
Washita National Wildlife Refuge	Custer County	OK	1961	8,075 acres (32.68 km^{2})
Wichita Mountains Wildlife Refuge	Comanche County	OK	1901	59,020 acres (238.8 km^{2})
Ankeny National Wildlife Refuge	Marion County	OR	1965	2,796 acres (11.32 km^{2})
Bandon Marsh National Wildlife Refuge	Coos County	OR	1983	864 acres (3.50 km^{2})
Baskett Slough National Wildlife Refuge	Polk County	OR	1965	2,492 acres (10.08 km^{2})
Bear Valley National Wildlife Refuge	Klamath County	OR	1978	4,200 acres (17 km^{2})
Cape Meares National Wildlife Refuge	Tillamook County	OR	1938	138.51 acres (0.5605 km^{2})
Cold Springs National Wildlife Refuge	Umatilla County	OR	1909	3,117 acres (12.61 km^{2})
Deer Flat National Wildlife Refuge	Malheur County; Baker County; Canyon County, Idaho; Owyhee County, Idaho; Payette County, Idaho; Washington County, Idaho	OR	1909	10,548 acres (42.69 km^{2})
Hart Mountain National Antelope Refuge	Lake County	OR	1936	270,608 acres (1,095.11 km^{2})
Julia Butler Hansen Refuge for the Columbian White-Tailed Deer	Clatsop County; Columbia County; Wahkiakum County, Washington	OR	1972	5,600 acres (23 km^{2})
Klamath Marsh National Wildlife Refuge	Klamath County	OR	1958	40,885 acres (165.46 km^{2})
Lewis and Clark National Wildlife Refuge	Clatsop County	OR	1972	12,167 acres (49.24 km^{2})
Lower Klamath National Wildlife Refuge	Klamath County; Siskiyou County, California	OR	1908	187,757 acres (759.83 km^{2})
Malheur National Wildlife Refuge	Harney County	OR	1908	187,757 acres (759.83 km^{2})
McKay Creek National Wildlife Refuge	Umatilla County	OR	1991	1,836.5 acres (7.432 km^{2})
Nestucca Bay National Wildlife Refuge	Tillamook County	OR	1991	1,202 acres (4.86 km^{2})
Oregon Islands National Wildlife Refuge	Oregon Coast	OR	1935	1,083 acres (4.38 km^{2})
Sheldon National Wildlife Refuge	Lake County; Humboldt County, Nevada; Washoe County, Nevada	OR	1931	573,504 acres (2,320.89 km^{2})
Siletz Bay National Wildlife Refuge	Lincoln County	OR	1991	568 acres (2.30 km^{2})
Three Arch Rocks National Wildlife Refuge	Tillamook County	OR	1907	15 acres (0.061 km^{2})
Tualatin River National Wildlife Refuge	Washington County; Yamhill County	OR	1992	1,856 acres (7.51 km^{2})
Umatilla National Wildlife Refuge	Morrow County; Benton County, Washington	OR	1969	23,783 acres (96.25 km^{2})
Upper Klamath National Wildlife Refuge	Klamath County	OR	1928	14,400 acres (58 km^{2})
Wapato Lake National Wildlife Refuge	Washington County; Yamhill County	OR	2013	4,310 acres (17.4 km^{2})
William L. Finley National Wildlife Refuge	Benton County	OR	1964	5,706 acres (23.09 km^{2})
Cherry Valley National Wildlife Refuge	Monroe County	PA	2008	185 acres (0.75 km^{2})
Erie National Wildlife Refuge	Crawford County	PA	1959	8,800 acres (36 km^{2})
John Heinz National Wildlife Refuge at Tinicum	Delaware County; Philadelphia County	PA	1972	1,200 acres (4.9 km^{2})
Cabo Rojo National Wildlife Refuge (Managed by the Caribbean Islands National Wildlife complex)	Cabo Rojo	PR	1974	1,836 acres (7.43 km^{2})
Culebra National Wildlife Refuge (Managed by the Caribbean Islands National Wildlife complex)	Isla Culebra	PR	1909	1,450 acres (5.9 km^{2})
Desecheo National Wildlife Refuge (Managed by the Caribbean Islands National Wildlife complex)	Mayagüez	PR	1976	360 acres (1.5 km^{2})
Laguna Cartagena National Wildlife Refuge (Managed by the Caribbean Islands National Wildlife complex)	Lajas	PR	1989	1,059 acres (4.29 km^{2})
Vieques National Wildlife Refuge (Managed by the Caribbean Islands National Wildlife complex)	Isla de Vieques	PR	2001	17,771 acres (71.92 km^{2})
Block Island National Wildlife Refuge (Managed by the Rhode Island National Wildlife Refuge Complex)	Washington County	RI	1973	127 acres (0.51 km^{2})
John H. Chafee National Wildlife Refuge (Managed by the Rhode Island National Wildlife Refuge Complex)	Washington County	RI	1988	317 acres (1.28 km^{2})
Ninigret National Wildlife Refuge (Managed by the Rhode Island National Wildlife Refuge Complex)	Washington County	RI	1970	900 acres (3.6 km^{2})
Sachuest Point National Wildlife Refuge (Managed by the Rhode Island National Wildlife Refuge Complex)	Newport County	RI	1970	242 acres (0.98 km^{2})
Trustom Pond National Wildlife Refuge (Managed by the Rhode Island National Wildlife Refuge Complex)	Washington County	RI	1974	787 acres (3.18 km^{2})
Cape Romain National Wildlife Refuge (Part of the South Carolina Lowcountry National Wildlife Refuge Complex)	Charleston County	SC	1932	66,287 acres (268.25 km^{2})
Carolina Sandhills National Wildlife Refuge	Chesterfield County	SC	1939	45,348 acres (183.52 km^{2})
Ernest F. Hollings ACE Basin National Wildlife Refuge (Part of the South Carolina Lowcountry National Wildlife Refuge Complex)	Beaufort County; Charleston County; Colleton County; Hampton County	SC	1990	11,815 acres (47.81 km^{2})
Pinckney Island National Wildlife Refuge (Part of the Savannah Coastal Refuges Complex)	Beaufort County	SC	1975	4,053 acres (16.40 km^{2})
Santee National Wildlife Refuge (Part of the Savannah Coastal Refuges Complex)	Clarendon County	SC	1941	15,000 acres (61 km^{2})
Tybee National Wildlife Refuge (Part of the Savannah Coastal Refuges Complex)	Jasper County	SC	1938	100 acres (0.40 km^{2})
Waccamaw National Wildlife Refuge (Part of the South Carolina Lowcountry National Wildlife Refuge Complex)	Georgetown County; Horry County; Marion County	SC	1997	22,931 acres (92.80 km^{2})
Bear Butte National Wildlife Refuge	Meade County	SD	1935	374 acres (1.51 km^{2})
Huron Wetland Management District	Central South Dakota	SD	1992	17,518 acres (70.89 km^{2})
Karl E. Mundt National Wildlife Refuge	Gregory County; Boyd County, Nebraska	SD	1974	1,085 acres (4.39 km^{2})
Lacreek National Wildlife Refuge	Bennett County	SD	1935	16,410 acres (66.4 km^{2})
Lake Andes National Wildlife Refuge	Charles Mix County	SD	1936	5,638 acres (22.82 km^{2})
Lake Andes Wetland Management District	Southeast South Dakota	SD	1961	82,731 acres (334.80 km^{2})
Madison Wetland Management District	East Central South Dakota	SD	1969	129,700 acres (525 km^{2})
Sand Lake National Wildlife Refuge	Brown County	SD	1935	21,498 acres (87.00 km^{2})
Sand Lake Wetland Management District	North Central South Dakota	SD	1961	45,000 acres (180 km^{2})
Waubay National Wildlife Refuge	Day County	SD	1935	4,650 acres (18.8 km^{2})
Waubay Wetland Management District	Northeast South Dakota	SD	1935	40,000 acres (160 km^{2})
Chickasaw National Wildlife Refuge (Part of the West Tennessee National Wildlife Refuge Complex)	Lauderdale County	TN	1985	25,006 acres (101.20 km^{2})
Cross Creeks National Wildlife Refuge	Stewart County	TN	1962	8,862 acres (35.86 km^{2})
Hatchie National Wildlife Refuge	Hardeman County; Haywood County	TN	1964	11,556 acres (46.77 km^{2})
Lake Isom National Wildlife Refuge (Part of the West Tennessee National Wildlife Refuge Complex)	Lake County	TN	1938	1,846 acres (7.47 km^{2})
Lower Hatchie National Wildlife Refuge (Part of the West Tennessee National Wildlife Refuge Complex)	Lauderdale County; Tipton County	TN	1980	9,451 acres (38.25 km^{2})
Paint Rock River National Wildlife Refuge	Jackson County	TN	2023	87 acres (0.35 km^{2})
Reelfoot National Wildlife Refuge (Part of the West Tennessee National Wildlife Refuge Complex)	Lake County; Obion County; Fulton County, Kentucky	TN	1941	10,428 acres (42.20 km^{2})
Tennessee National Wildlife Refuge	Benton County; Decatur County; Henry County; Humphreys County	TN	1945	51,359 acres (207.84 km^{2})
Aransas National Wildlife Refuge	Aransas County; Calhoun County; Refugio County	TX	1937	114,657 acres (464.00 km^{2})
Attwater Prairie Chicken National Wildlife Refuge	Colorado County	TX	1972	10,528 acres (42.61 km^{2})
Balcones Canyonlands National Wildlife Refuge	Burnet County; Travis County; Williamson County	TX	1992	46,080 acres (186.5 km^{2})
Big Boggy National Wildlife Refuge	Matagorda County	TX	1983	5,000 acres (20 km^{2})
Brazoria National Wildlife Refuge	Brazoria County	TX	1969	44,414 acres (179.74 km^{2})
Buffalo Lake National Wildlife Refuge	Randall County	TX	1958	7,680 acres (31.1 km^{2})
Caddo Lake National Wildlife Refuge	Harrison County	TX	2000	8,493 acres (34.37 km^{2})
Hagerman National Wildlife Refuge	Grayson County	TX	1946	11,320 acres (45.8 km^{2})
Jocelyn Nungaray National Wildlife Refuge (formerly Anahuac NWR) (Administered as part of the Texas Chenier Plain Refuge Complex)	Chambers County	TX	1963	37,000 acres (150 km^{2})
Laguna Atascosa National Wildlife Refuge	Cameron County; Willacy County	TX	1946	65,096 acres (263.43 km^{2})
Lower Rio Grande Valley National Wildlife Refuge	Cameron County; Hidalgo County; Starr County; Zapata County	TX	1979	90,788 acres (367.41 km^{2})
McFaddin National Wildlife Refuge (Administered as part of the Texas Chenier Plain Refuge Complex)	Jefferson County	TX	1980	58,861 acres (238.20 km^{2})
Moody National Wildlife Refuge (Administered as part of the Texas Chenier Plain Refuge Complex)	Chambers County	TX	1961	3,517 acres (14.23 km^{2}) (Easement on private land)
Muleshoe National Wildlife Refuge	Bailey County	TX	1935	6,440 acres (26.1 km^{2})
Neches River National Wildlife Refuge	Anderson County; Cherokee County	TX	2006	4,404 acres (17.82 km^{2})
San Bernard National Wildlife Refuge	Brazoria County; Matagorda County	TX	1969	45,730 acres (185.1 km^{2})
Santa Ana National Wildlife Refuge	Hidalgo County	TX	1943	2,088 acres (8.45 km^{2})
Texas Point National Wildlife Refuge (Administered as part of the Texas Chenier Plain Refuge Complex)	Jefferson County	TX	1979	8,972 acres (36.31 km^{2})
Trinity River National Wildlife Refuge	Liberty County	TX	1994	30,000 acres (120 km^{2})
Bear River Migratory Bird Refuge	Box Elder County	UT	1928	79,000 acres (320 km^{2})
Fish Springs National Wildlife Refuge	Juab County	UT	1959	17,992 acres (72.81 km^{2})
Ouray National Wildlife Refuge	Uintah County	UT	1960	11,987 acres (48.51 km^{2})
Missisquoi National Wildlife Refuge	Franklin County	VT	1943	6,642 acres (26.88 km^{2})
Buck Island National Wildlife Refuge (Managed by the Caribbean Islands National Wildlife complex)	St. Thomas	VI	1969	45 acres (0.18 km^{2})
Green Cay National Wildlife Refuge (Managed by the Caribbean Islands National Wildlife complex)	St. Croix	VI	1977	14 acres (0.057 km^{2})
Sandy Point National Wildlife Refuge (Managed by the Caribbean Islands National Wildlife complex)	St. Croix	VI	1984	360 acres (1.5 km^{2})
Back Bay National Wildlife Refuge	Virginia Beach	VA	1938	9,062 acres (36.67 km^{2})
Chincoteague National Wildlife Refuge	Accomack County; Worcester County, Maryland	VA	1943	14,000 acres (57 km^{2})
Eastern Shore of Virginia National Wildlife Refuge	Northampton County	VA	1984	1,127 acres (4.56 km^{2})
Elizabeth Hartwell Mason Neck National Wildlife Refuge (Part of the Potomac River National Wildlife Refuge Complex)	Fairfax County	VA	1969	2,277 acres (9.21 km^{2})
Featherstone National Wildlife Refuge (Part of the Potomac River National Wildlife Refuge Complex)	Prince William County	VA	1970	325 acres (1.32 km^{2})
Fisherman Island National Wildlife Refuge	Northampton County	VA	1973	1,850 acres (7.5 km^{2})
Great Dismal Swamp National Wildlife Refuge	Chesapeake; Suffolk; Camden County, North Carolina; Gates County, North Carolina; Pasquotank County, North Carolina	VA	1974	112,000 acres (450 km^{2})
James River National Wildlife Refuge (Part of the Eastern Virginia Rivers National Wildlife Refuge Complex)	Prince George County	VA	1991	4,200 acres (17 km^{2})
Nansemond National Wildlife Refuge	Suffolk	VA	1973	411 acres (1.66 km^{2})
Occoquan Bay National Wildlife Refuge (Part of the Potomac River National Wildlife Refuge Complex)	Prince William County	VA	1998	644 acres (2.61 km^{2})
Plum Tree Island National Wildlife Refuge^	Poquoson	VA	1972	3,501 acres (14.17 km^{2})
Presquile National Wildlife Refuge (Part of the Eastern Virginia Rivers National Wildlife Refuge Complex)	Chesterfield County	VA	1953	1,329 acres (5.38 km^{2})
Rappahannock River Valley National Wildlife Refuge (Part of the Eastern Virginia Rivers National Wildlife Refuge Complex)	Caroline County; Essex County; King George County; Richmond County	VA	1996	9,030 acres (36.5 km^{2})
Wallops Island National Wildlife Refuge	Wallops Island, Accomack County	VA	1975	373 acres (1.51 km^{2})
Billy Frank Jr. Nisqually National Wildlife Refuge	Thurston County; Pierce County	WA	1974	4,529 acres (18.33 km^{2})
Columbia National Wildlife Refuge	Adams County; Grant County	WA	1944	29,596 acres (119.77 km^{2})
Conboy Lake National Wildlife Refuge	Klickitat County	WA	1964	7,072 acres (28.62 km^{2})
Copalis National Wildlife Refuge (Part of the Washington Maritime National Wildlife Refuge Complex)	Grays Harbor County	WA	1907	60.8 acres (0.246 km^{2})
Dungeness National Wildlife Refuge (Part of the Washington Maritime National Wildlife Refuge Complex)	Clallam County	WA	1915	772.52 acres (3.1263 km^{2})
Flattery Rocks National Wildlife Refuge (Part of the Washington Maritime National Wildlife Refuge Complex)	Clallam County	WA	1907	125 acres (0.51 km^{2})
Franz Lake National Wildlife Refuge	Skamania County	WA	1990	551.73 acres (2.2328 km^{2})
Grays Harbor National Wildlife Refuge	Grays Harbor County	WA	1990	1,471.38 acres (5.9545 km^{2})
Julia Butler Hansen Refuge for the Columbian White-Tailed Deer	Wahkiakum County; Clatsop County, Oregon; Columbia County, Oregon	WA	1972	5,600 acres (23 km^{2})
Little Pend Oreille National Wildlife Refuge	Pend Oreille County; Stevens County	WA	1939	42,593.57 acres (172.3701 km^{2})
McNary National Wildlife Refuge	Walla Walla County	WA	1956	14,664.54 acres (59.3453 km^{2})
Pierce National Wildlife Refuge	Skamania County	WA	1983	329.38 acres (1.3330 km^{2})
Protection Island National Wildlife Refuge (Part of the Washington Maritime National Wildlife Refuge Complex)	Jefferson County	WA	1982	659.31 acres (2.6681 km^{2})
Quillayute Needles National Wildlife Refuge (Part of the Washington Maritime National Wildlife Refuge Complex)	Clallam County; Jefferson County	WA	1907	300.2 acres (1.215 km^{2})
Ridgefield National Wildlife Refuge	Clark County	WA	1965	5,228.1 acres (21.157 km^{2})
Saddle Mountain National Wildlife Refuge/Hanford Reach National Monument	Adams County; Benton County; Franklin County; Grant County	WA	2000	194,451 acres (786.92 km^{2})
San Juan Islands National Wildlife Refuge (Part of the Washington Maritime National Wildlife Refuge Complex)	San Juan County	WA	1976	454 acres (1.84 km^{2})
Steigerwald Lake National Wildlife Refuge	Clark County	WA	1987	1,049 acres (4.25 km^{2})
Toppenish National Wildlife Refuge	Yakima County	WA	1964	1,978 acres (8.00 km^{2})
Turnbull National Wildlife Refuge	Spokane County	WA	1937	18,684.98 acres (75.6154 km^{2})
Umatilla National Wildlife Refuge	Benton County; Morrow County, Oregon	WA	1969	23,783 acres (96.25 km^{2})
Willapa National Wildlife Refuge	Pacific County	WA	1937	11,000 acres (45 km^{2})
Canaan Valley National Wildlife Refuge	Tucker County	WV	11 July 1994	16,613.44 acres (67.2322 km^{2})
Ohio River Islands National Wildlife Refuge	Ohio River	WV	1990	2,664.54 acres (10.7830 km^{2})
Driftless Area National Wildlife Refuge	Grant County; Richland County; Illinois; Iowa	WI	1989	812 acres (3.29 km^{2})
Fox River National Wildlife Refuge	Marquette County	WI	1979	1,054 acres (4.27 km^{2})
Gravel Island National Wildlife Refuge	Door County	WI	1913	28 acres (0.11 km^{2})
Green Bay National Wildlife Refuge	Door County, Delta County, Michigan	WI	1912	330 acres (1.3 km^{2})
Hackmatack National Wildlife Refuge	Walworth County	WI	2012	11 acres (0.045 km^{2})
Horicon National Wildlife Refuge	Dodge County; Fond du Lac County	WI	1941	21,400 acres (87 km^{2})
Leopold Wetland Management District	Southeastern Wisconsin	WI	1993	13,000 acres (53 km^{2})
Necedah National Wildlife Refuge	Juneau County	WI	1939	43,696 acres (176.83 km^{2})
St. Croix Wetland Management District	West Central Wisconsin	WI	1992	7,500 acres (30 km^{2})
Trempealeau National Wildlife Refuge	Buffalo County; Trempealeau County	WI	1936	6,226 acres (25.20 km^{2})
Whittlesey Creek National Wildlife Refuge	Bayfield County	WI	1999	329 acres (1.33 km^{2})
Bamforth National Wildlife Refuge	Albany County	WY	1932	1,116 acres (4.52 km^{2})
Cokeville Meadows National Wildlife Refuge	Lincoln County	WY	1993	26,657 acres (107.88 km^{2})
Hutton Lake National Wildlife Refuge	Albany County	WY	1932	1,968 acres (7.96 km^{2})
Mortenson Lake National Wildlife Refuge	Albany County	WY	1993	1,776 acres (7.19 km^{2})
National Elk Refuge	Teton County	WY	1912	25,000 acres (100 km^{2})
Pathfinder National Wildlife Refuge	Carbon County; Natrona County	WY	1909	16,807 acres (68.02 km^{2})
Seedskadee National Wildlife Refuge	Sweetwater County	WY	1965	27,230 acres (110.2 km^{2})
Navassa Island National Wildlife Refuge (Part of the Caribbean Islands National Wildlife Refuge Complex)		UM		
Baker Island National Wildlife Refuge (Managed under the Hawaiian Islands National Wildlife Refuge)		UM		
Howland Island National Wildlife Refuge (Managed under the Hawaiian Islands National Wildlife Refuge)		UM		
Jarvis Island National Wildlife Refuge (Managed under the Hawaiian Islands National Wildlife Refuge)		UM		
Johnston Atoll National Wildlife Refuge (Managed under the Hawaiian Islands National Wildlife Refuge)		UM		
Kingman Reef National Wildlife Refuge (Managed under the Hawaiian Islands National Wildlife Refuge)		UM		
Palmyra Atoll National Wildlife Refuge (Managed under the Hawaiian Islands National Wildlife Refuge)		UM		
Wake Atoll National Wildlife Refuge (Managed under the Hawaiian Islands National Wildlife Refuge)		UM		

== See also ==
- List of largest National Wildlife Refuges
- Klamath Basin National Wildlife Refuges Complex
- Mid-Columbia River National Wildlife Refuge Complex
- Oregon Coast National Wildlife Refuge Complex
- Sheldon-Hart Mountain National Wildlife Refuge Complex
- Willamette Valley National Wildlife Refuge Complex
