= Savannah Coastal Refuges Complex =

United States National Wildlife Refuge complex in Georgia and South Carolina

- IUCN category IV (habitat/species management area)
- Location within the United States
- Location: Georgia and South Carolina, United States
- Nearest city: Savannah, Georgia
- Coordinates: 32°11′50.6580″N 81°7′13.0800″W
- Area: 56,000 acres (23,000 ha)
- Governing body: U.S. Fish and Wildlife Service

The Savannah Coastal Refuges Complex administers seven wildlife refuges between Georgia and South Carolina. Over 56,000 acres (230 km^{2}) of refuge land along a 100-mile coast line are administered by the complex.

The complex includes seven refuges:

- Savannah National Wildlife Refuge - Established 1927
- Wolf Island National Wildlife Refuge - Established 1930
- Tybee National Wildlife Refuge - Established 1938
- Blackbeard Island National Wildlife Refuge - Established 1940
- Harris Neck National Wildlife Refuge - Established 1962
- Wassaw National Wildlife Refuge - Established 1969
- Pinckney Island National Wildlife Refuge - Established 1975

The Headquarters Office for Savannah Coastal Refuges Complex is located in Savannah, Georgia. The complex has a combined staff of 31 with a fiscal year 2005 budget of $3,582,000.

The Complex office reported a fire at Wassaw National Wildlife Refuge in 2026.

== See also ==
- List of National Wildlife Refuges
