= Big Stone Wetland Management District =

Conservation management unit of local government in Minnesota, United States

Coordinates: 45°15′36″N 96°20′23″W

Big Stone Wetland Management District is a protected area encompassing scattered wetlands in Lincoln and Lyon Counties, Minnesota, United States. It is operated by the U.S. Fish and Wildlife Service out of headquarters within Big Stone National Wildlife Refuge. District staff also serve private land resource interests by providing technical assistance for United States Department of Agriculture programs and restoring wetlands on private lands.

Currently, there are 22 Waterfowl Production Areas, two FmHA conservation easements and 31 wetland or habitat protection easements in the district, totaling approximately 6,900 acres (28 km^{2}). The District is also responsible for managing several USFWS properties and easements that are part of the Northern Tallgrass Prairie National Wildlife Refuge. The area remains a critical waterfowl breeding and migration area and offers potential for many resource protection/enhancement projects within several watersheds that empty into the Minnesota River.
