= Ottawa National Wildlife Refuge Complex =

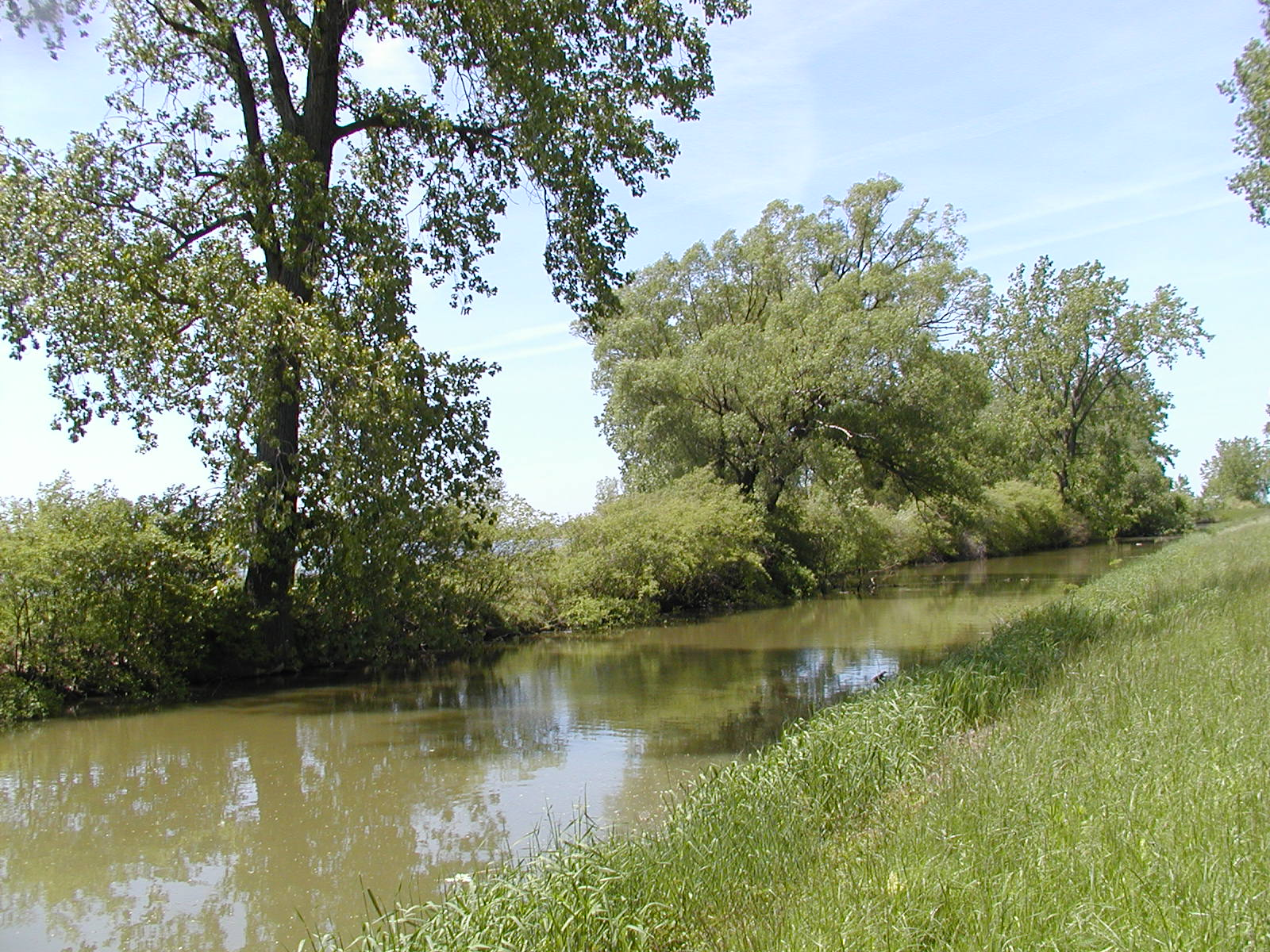
Cedar Point National Wildlife Refuge, one of the three refuges in the Ottawa National Wildlife Refuge Complex

Ottawa National Wildlife Refuge Complex is a National Wildlife Refuge complex in the state of Ohio.

== Refuges within the complex ==
- Cedar Point National Wildlife Refuge
- Ottawa National Wildlife Refuge
- West Sister Island National Wildlife Refuge
