= Southeast Idaho National Wildlife Refuge Complex =

National wildlife refuge in Idaho, USA

Southeast Idaho National Wildlife Refuge Complex is a National Wildlife Refuge complex in the state of Idaho.

== Refuges within the complex ==
- Bear Lake National Wildlife Refuge
- Camas National Wildlife Refuge
- Grays Lake National Wildlife Refuge
- Minidoka National Wildlife Refuge
