= Mid-Columbia River National Wildlife Refuge Complex =

Protected areas in Oregon and Washington, United States

Coordinates: 46°12′03.00″N 118°59′38.99″W

Mid-Columbia River National Wildlife Refuge Complex is a group of protected areas in the U.S. states of Oregon and Washington that are part of the National Wildlife Refuge System, managed by the U.S. Fish and Wildlife Service. Headquartered in Burbank, Washington, this unit of the USFWS is responsible for four national wildlife refuges (NWR)s on or near the Columbia River. They are Cold Springs, McKay Creek, McNary, and Umatilla NWRs.
