= Iowa Wetland Management District =

Coordinates: 43.282°N 94.115°W

The Iowa Wetland Management District is part of Union Slough National Wildlife Refuge but is very different from other wetland management districts. Under a Memorandum of Understanding with the Iowa Department of Natural Resources, the State manages many of the waterfowl production areas (WPAs) in the district. This is a partnership that has been very beneficial to the United States Fish and Wildlife Service. Together, the State and the Service have been able to develop large complexes of habitat for waterfowl and other wildlife species.

Although the Wetland Management District encompasses 35 counties, at this date, there are WPAs in 16 counties. Most acquisitions are intended to increase habitat at existing wetland complexes, so it is unlikely that tracts will be acquired in the entire 35-county area.

Most WPAs are small, from 100 to 500 acres (2.0 km^{2}), but several have grown considerably. Union Hills WPA in Cerro Gordo County is the largest in Iowa at over 2,000 acres (8.1 km^{2}). Spring Run, a large complex of State and Federal lands in Dickinson County, is the second largest WPA. Dugout Creek WPA in Dickinson County and Lower Morse Lake in Wright County are also among the larger restored tracts in the Iowa Wetland Management District.
