= Chesapeake Marshlands National Wildlife Refuge Complex =

National Wildlife Refuge complex in Maryland, US

Coordinates: 39°1′51″N 76°13′28″W

Chesapeake Marshlands National Wildlife Refuge Complex is a National Wildlife Refuge complex in the state of Maryland located near the Delmarva Peninsula.

== Refuges within the complex ==
- Blackwater National Wildlife Refuge
- Eastern Neck National Wildlife Refuge
- Martin National Wildlife Refuge
- Susquehanna River National Wildlife Refuge
