= Oxford Slough Waterfowl Production Area =

Protected area in Idaho, United States

- IUCN category IV (habitat/species management area)
- Location within the United States
- Location: Bannock and Franklin counties, Idaho, United States
- Nearest city: Oxford, ID
- Coordinates: 42°14′09″N 111°59′36″W
- Area: 1,878 acres (2.934 sq mi; 7.60 km^{2})
- Established: 1985
- Governing body: U.S. Fish and Wildlife Service
- Website: Oxford Slough Waterfowl Production Area

Oxford Slough Waterfowl Production Area is a slough in Franklin and Bannock counties on the edge of Oxford in southeast Idaho. It was purchased in 1985 from the Federal Land Bank using Federal Duck Stamp funds to protect redhead nesting habitat. The area is largely hardstem bulrush marsh, interspersed with open water and surrounded by areas of playa, saltgrass flats, native wet meadow, and some cropland. The lower areas have visible alkali deposits. The marsh is fed on the north and drained at the south by Deep Creek. A smaller creek and several springs feed the marsh from the west. It is managed by Bear Lake National Wildlife Refuge.

Attempts to drain it in the 1950s were marginally successful; the drainage ditches still exist but have mostly filled in. The native pasture is no longer grazed. Most of the meadows are hayed to provide short grass feeding areas for geese and cranes. Most of the dry cropland has been converted to dense nesting cover. The irrigated cropland is used for small grains under a cooperative farm agreement; a portion of the crop is left each year for wildlife.
