= North Central Valley Wildlife Management Area =

Protected area in California, United States

Located within 11 counties in the Sacramento Valley and the Sacramento-San Joaquin Delta of California, North Central Valley Wildlife Management Area consists of conservation easements acquired on privately owned wetlands (primarily waterfowl hunting clubs). The landscape is very flat, bordered by the Sierra and Coast ranges and is surrounded by intensive agriculture.

The purpose of the project is to protect wetland habitat by acquiring conservation easements on up to 55,000 acres (220 km^{2}) of land; this includes approximately 8,500 acres (34 km^{2}) of existing wetlands and 46,500 acres (188 km^{2}) of former wetlands to be restored and developed for waterfowl and other wetland-related wildlife. The area is an expansion of the highly successful Butte Sink and Willow Creek-Lurline Wildlife Management Areas and is implemented in accordance with the habitat acquisition goals of the Central Valley Habitat Joint Venture of the North American Waterfowl Management Plan. Conservation easement requires landowners to maintain land in wetlands.
