= Detroit Lakes Wetland Management District =

Conservation management unit of local government in Minnesota, United States

Coordinates: 46°51′N 95°51′W

Detroit Lakes Wetland Management District is located in northwest Minnesota and includes the counties of Becker, Clay, Mahnomen, Norman, and Polk - an area of approximately 6,000 square miles (16,000 km^{2}). The district is divided into three general landscape areas, roughly equal in size. From west to east, these are: the Red River Valley floodplain, the glacial moraine/prairie pothole region, and the hardwood/coniferous forest. The district currently manages over 42,000 acres (170 km^{2}) of public land in 165 waterfowl production areas (WPAs). Additionally, district staff are responsible for more than 300 wetland and upland easements on private property, totaling more than 11,000 acres (45 km^{2}).

Land acquisition and management efforts are focused in the prairie pothole region of the district, with a goal of providing habitat for nesting waterfowl. District acquisition and restoration efforts, begun in the late 1950s, have preserved and restored remnants of the tallgrass prairie and prairie wetlands. Approximately 3,200 acres (13 km^{2}) of the district's total acreage are true native prairie remnants.

The primary economic base of the area is agriculture, with a strong tourism industry based on area lakes on the west side of the district. Intensive agriculture and drainage over the past 100 years has extensively altered the look and function of the historic landscape. In today's landscape, row crops dominate.

A variety of acquisition efforts, including the Small Wetlands Acquisition Program, which permits the United States Fish and Wildlife Service to purchase lands for waterfowl production using money generated from the sale of "Duck Stamps," have preserved important remnants of the tallgrass prairie and prairie wetland ecosystems.
