= J. Clark Salyer Wetland Management District =

Coordinates: 48°37′00″N 100°42′30″W

J. Clark Salyer Wetland Management District is located in north-central North Dakota. It covers 6,543 square miles (16,900 km^{2}) in Renville, Bottineau, Rolette, McHenry, and Pierce Counties. Within the District, the U.S. Fish and Wildlife Service manages 27,332 acres (110.6 km^{2}) of waterfowl production areas (WPA), 128,117 acres (518.47 km^{2}) of wetland easements, 15,231 acres (61.64 km^{2}) of grassland easements, 6,500 acres (26 km^{2}) of Farmers Home Administration conservation easements, and 7,910 acres (32 km^{2}) of easement refuges.
