= Minnesota Valley Wetland Management District =

Conservation management unit of local government in Minnesota, United States

Coordinates: 44°43′6″N 93°37′44″W

The Minnesota Valley Wetland Management District is a fourteen-county district located in east central Minnesota, United States. It includes portions of the Minnesota, Cannon, and Mississippi River watersheds. The United States Fish and Wildlife Service works to protect the area's natural landscape through private lands habitat restorations, acquisition of waterfowl production areas (WPAs), and management of FmHA conservation easements. Since 1990, the Service has acquired 4,255 acres (17.22 km^{2}) of WPAs and approximately 1,898 easement acres (7.68 km^{2}). Private land restoration projects total 7,011 acres (28.37 km^{2}) of wetland in 1,227 basins and 4,849 acres (19.62 km^{2}) of native prairie on 223 sites.
