= St. Croix Wetland Management District =

Coordinates: 45°07′06″N 92°36′37″W

The St. Croix Wetland Management District in west-central Wisconsin, United States, encompasses a diversity of habitats lying along the eastern edge of the tallgrass prairie. Within the eight-county district, one can travel north through the high river bluffs of Pepin County, to the prairie potholes of St. Croix County, and then to the pine barrens of Burnett County.

The district includes Barron, Burnett, Dunn, Washburn, Pierce, Pepin, Polk and St. Croix counties. The central portion of St. Croix County, the heart of the district, is known as the Star Prairie Pothole Grasslands. These grasslands are ranked sixth out of 26 priority grassland landscapes in Wisconsin.

The district manages relatively small tracts of prairie wetland and grassland habitats known as waterfowl production areas (WPAs). WPAs are purchased using Federal Duck Stamp dollars within the historic prairie pothole portion of the district, including southern Polk, St. Croix and Dunn counties. After purchase, prairie wetland and grassland habitats are restored and then managed for breeding waterfowl, other migratory birds and indigenous wildlife.

The district's 41 WPAs totaling 7,500 acres (30 km^{2}) are administered by the U.S. Fish and Wildlife Service's National Wildlife Refuge System. In addition to managing WPAs, district staff provide assistance to private landowners who wish to manage their land to benefit wildlife.

The St. Croix Wetland Management District is adjacent to the Minneapolis/St. Paul Metropolitan Area of two million people. This presents unique opportunities and challenges for prairie wetland habitat preservation, restoration and management.
