= Mattamuskeet, Swanquarter and Cedar Island National Wildlife Refuge Complex =

National Wildlife Refuge complex in North Carolina, United States

Coordinates: 35°27′04″N 76°10′36″W

The Mattamuskeet, Swanquarter and Cedar Island National Wildlife Refuge Complex is an administrative organization that manages U.S. Fish and Wildlife Service wildlife refuges in eastern North Carolina. The complex includes

- Mattamuskeet National Wildlife Refuge
- Swanquarter National Wildlife Refuge
- Cedar Island National Wildlife Refuge

The complex headquarters and visitor center is in the Mattamuskeet refuge headquarters. The Swanquarter refuge is unstaffed, while Cedar Island has only a firefighter
