= Madison Wetland Management District =

Wetland management district in South Dakota, U.S.

- IUCN category IV (habitat/species management area)
- Location within South Dakota Location within the United States
- Location: South Dakota, United States
- Nearest city: Madison, SD
- Coordinates: 44°11′30″N 96°56′57″W
- Area: 129,700 acres (52,500 ha)
- Established: 1962
- Governing body: U.S. Fish and Wildlife Service
- Website: Madison Wetland Management District

Madison Wetland Management District is located in the U.S. state of South Dakota and includes 129,700 acres (524 km^{2}). 38,500 acres (155 km^{2}) is owned by the U.S. Government while the remaining area is protected through easements in agreement with the state and other entities. The refuge is managed by the U.S. Fish and Wildlife Service. The wetlands are a part of the Prairie Pothole Region, well known to be an outstanding natural resource area that is vital for migratory bird species. As the Great Plains were being plowed under, conservationists groups worked towards ensuring wetlands would be preserved to protect these areas. Now known as Waterfowl Production Areas, preservation of this region helps to ensure a sustainable population of hundreds of migratory bird species and other plant and animal species dependent on this ecosystem.

The refuge allows fishing and hunting in limited areas and in season.
