= Presquile National Wildlife Refuge =

United States National Wildlife Refuge in Virginia

- IUCN category IV (habitat/species management area)
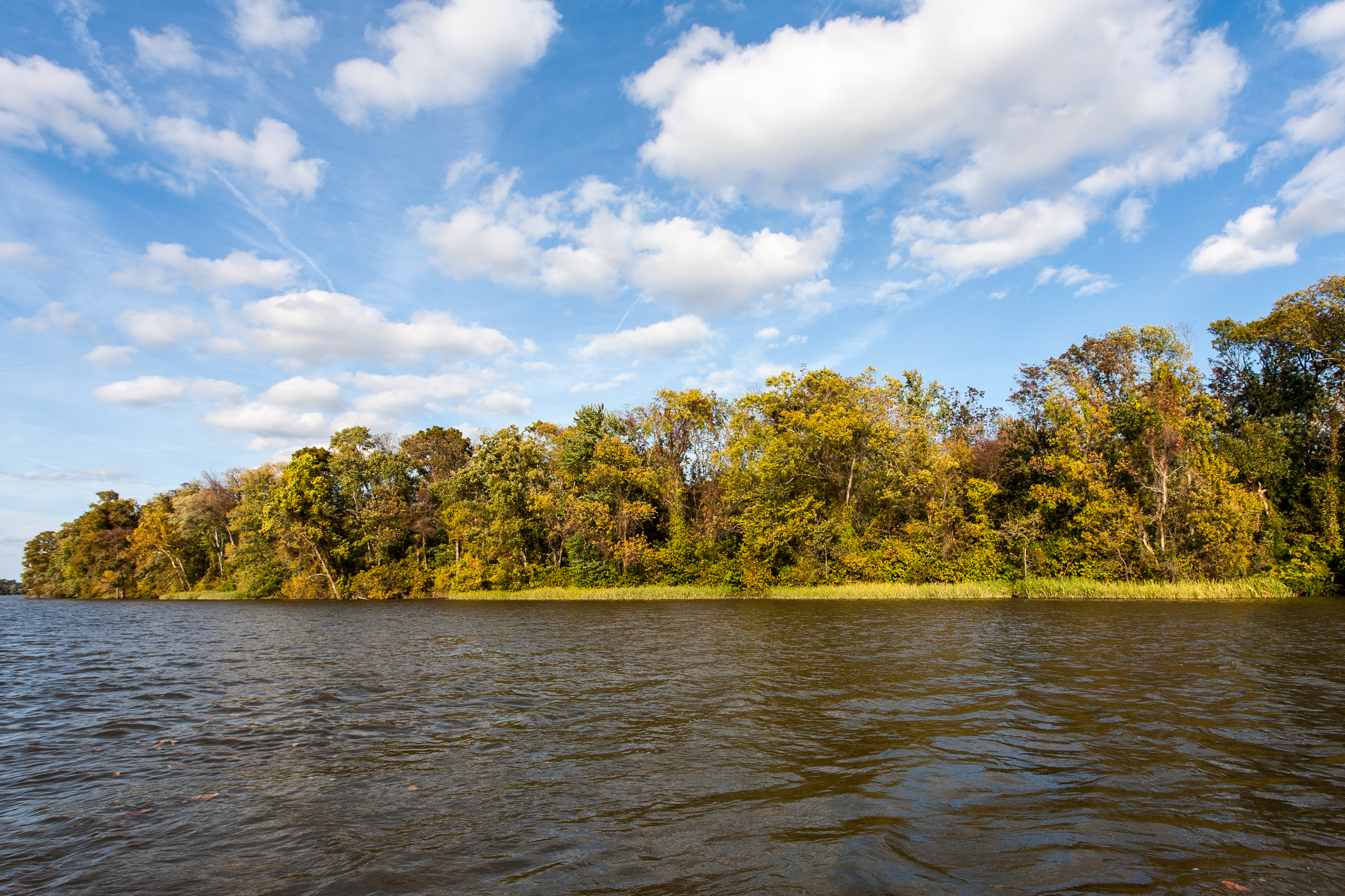

- Location within Virginia Location within the United States
- Location: Chesterfield County, Virginia, United States
- Nearest city: Hopewell, Virginia
- Coordinates: 37°21′45″N 77°15′39″W
- Area: 1,329 acres (5.38 km^{2})
- Established: 1953
- Governing body: U.S. Fish and Wildlife Service
- Website: Presquile National Wildlife Refuge

Presquile National Wildlife Refuge in the U.S. state of Virginia is one of four refuges that make up the Eastern Virginia Rivers National Wildlife Refuge Complex. It is managed by the United States Fish and Wildlife Service. The refuge is a 1,329-acre (5.38 km^{2}) island in the James River, located approximately 20 miles (32 km) south of Richmond. It is located in the easternmost part of Chesterfield County, northeast of Hopewell.

In 1953, A. D Williams, a Richmond tobacco magnate, willed a parcel of land called Presquile to the Virginia Commission of Game and Inland Fisheries for use as a wildlife refuge. Previously Presquile had functioned as a farm and plantation. The main house at Presquile was built in the 1760s but was demolished in 1964.

Established to protect habitat for wintering waterfowl and other migratory birds, Presquile is an important component in the network of refuges on and around the Chesapeake Bay, the largest estuary in the United States. Presquile historically provided important habitat for wintering Canada geese that breed along James Bay in eastern Canada. The refuge is also home to nesting and roosting bald eagles. The refuge is primarily hardwood swamp, with a fringe of marsh and 300 acres (1.2 km^{2}) of upland fields.
