= Louisiana Wetland Management District =

The Louisiana Wetland Management District was established in September 1990 in response to growing U.S. Fish and Wildlife Service responsibilities on lands that were off traditional refuges. These include Farmer's Home Administration (FmHA) and fee title tracts, leases and work on private lands. The Wetland Management District encompasses 20 parishes in the northern half of the state. Most of the 37 FmHA easements, 10 fee title tracts, and 4 leases are concentrated in northeastern Louisiana. Louisiana Wetland Management District currently oversees Service interests on 25,710 acres (104.0 km^{2}) not including Partners agreements
