= Potomac River National Wildlife Refuge Complex =

United States National Wildlife Refuge complex in Virginia

The Potomac River National Wildlife Refuge Complex is a complex of three National Wildlife Refuges in Virginia, located along the Potomac River.

The three refuges are:

- Elizabeth Hartwell Mason Neck National Wildlife Refuge
- Featherstone National Wildlife Refuge
- Occoquan Bay National Wildlife Refuge

The first two are administered jointly for planning, while the third is currently treated separately.
