= Eastern Virginia Rivers National Wildlife Refuge Complex =

United States National Wildlife Refuge complex in Virginia

The Eastern Virginia Rivers National Wildlife Refuge Complex is a complex of four National Wildlife Refuges in Virginia whose management is overseen by the United States Fish and Wildlife Service. The four refuges are:

- James River National Wildlife Refuge
- Presquile National Wildlife Refuge
- Plum Tree Island National Wildlife Refuge
- Rappahannock River Valley National Wildlife Refuge
