= Lostwood Wetland Management District =

- IUCN category IV (habitat/species management area)
- Location within the United States
- Location: North Dakota, USA
- Nearest city: Stanley, ND
- Coordinates: 48°34′08″N 102°26′51″W
- Governing body: U.S. Fish and Wildlife Service
- Website: Lostwood Wetland Management District

The Lostwood Wetland Management District is located in the U.S. state of North Dakota and extends from the Canada–United States border to the neighboring state of Montana. The district consists almost exclusively of privately owned property, and landowners work cooperatively with the U.S. Fish and Wildlife Service to manage the land to maximize natural and agricultural needs. Hundreds of small bodies of water, wetlands and uplands are set aside to increase bird productivity and provide habitat for native animals and plants. The district comprises various areas spread throughout northwestern North Dakota which include waterfowl production areas, wetland easements, grassland easements, and easement refuges. The properties are located in Mountrail and part of Ward County, North Dakota.

The WMD includes Lostwood NWR, Shell Lake NWR and Des Lacs NWR.

There are 155 waterfowl production areas within the complex, totaling 31,266 acres. There are also over 188,000 acres of wetland and grassland easements throughout the complex.
