= Long Lake Wetland Management District =

Coordinates: 46°40′N 100°17′W

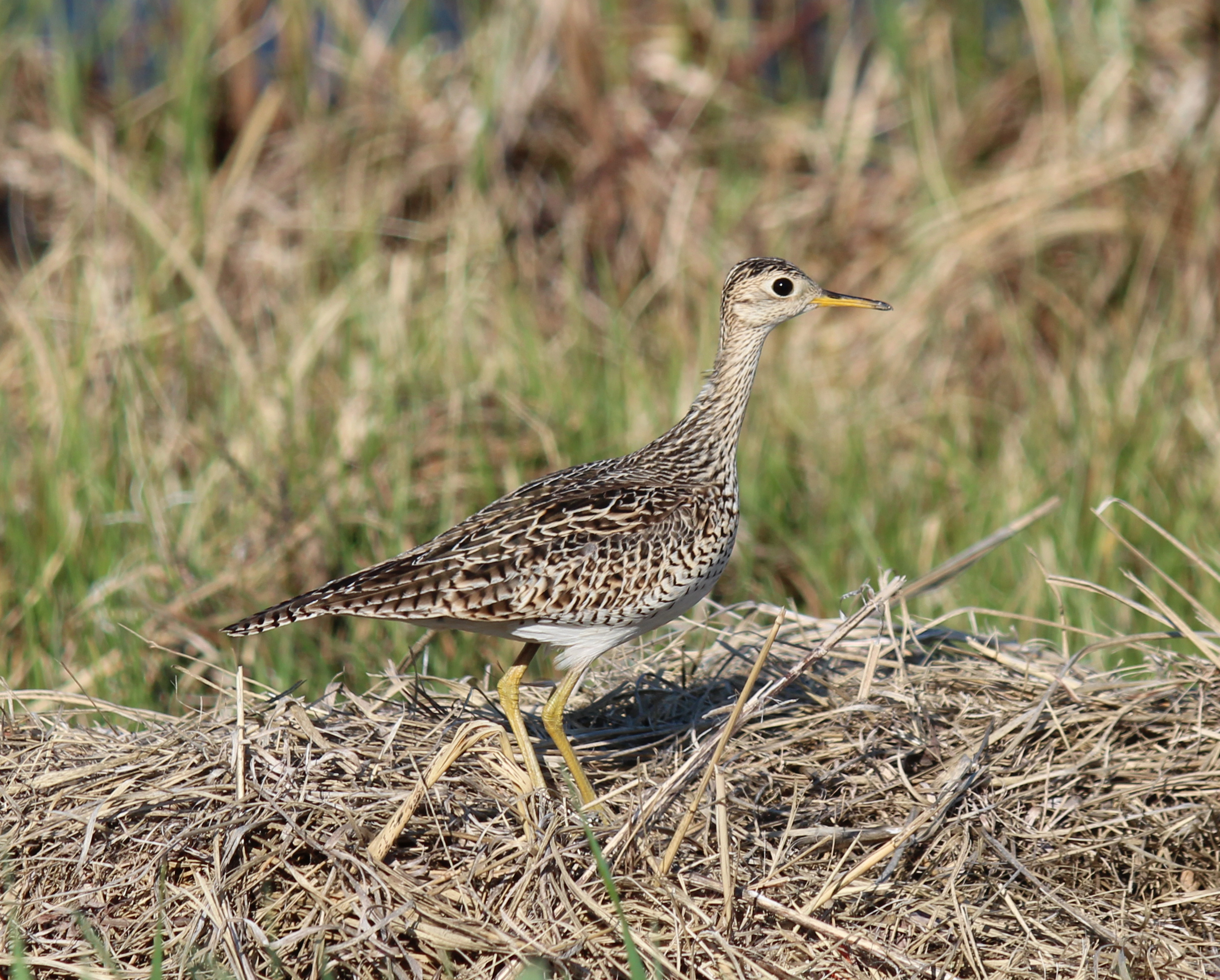
An upland sandpiper at Long Lake WMD

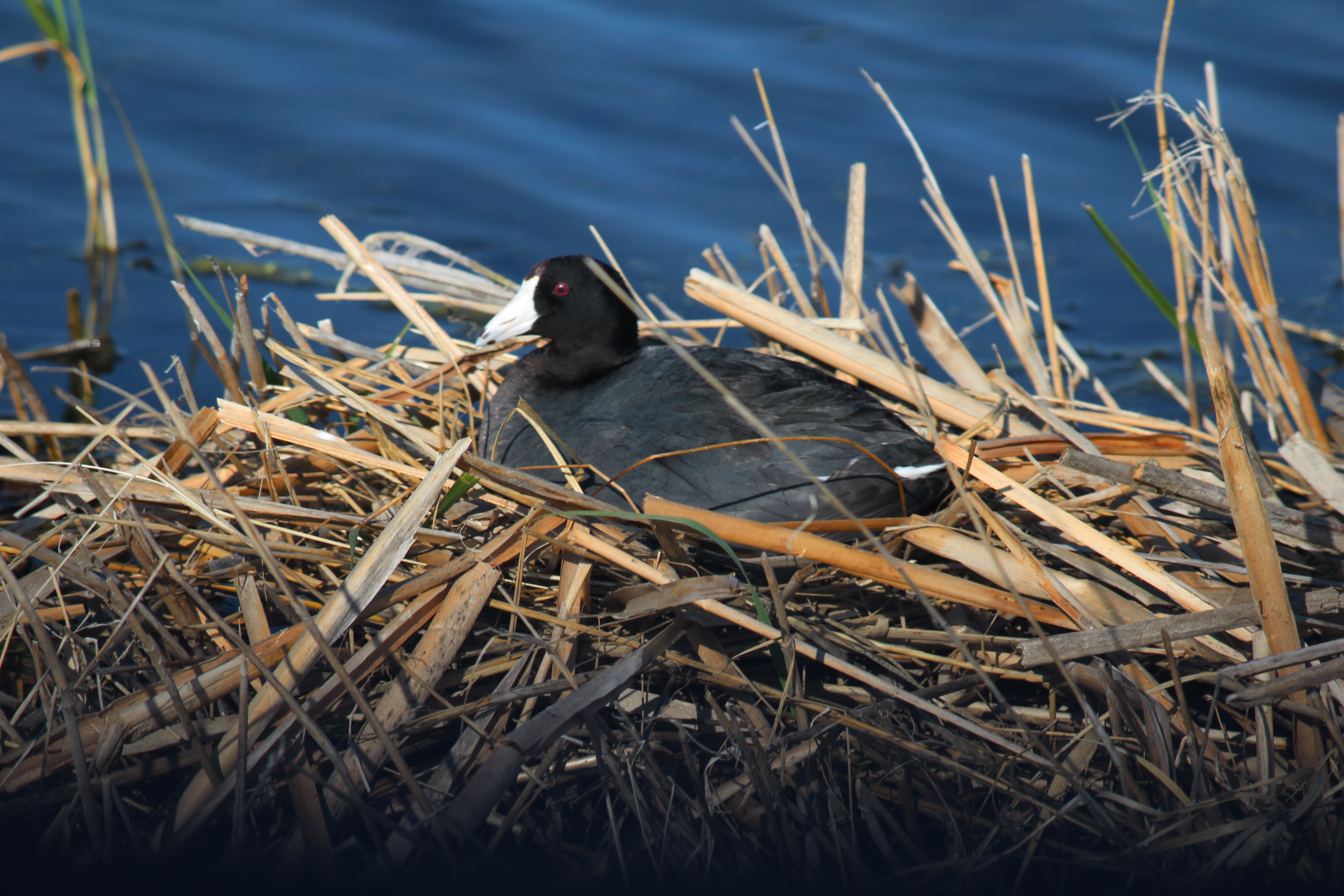
American coot at Long Lake Wetland Management District.

Long Lake Wetland Management District encompasses three counties in south-central North Dakota, an area famed for its wealth of waterfowl-producing potholes and native prairie grasslands. Headquarters for the Wetland Management District is located in the Long Lake National Wildlife Refuge office near Moffit, North Dakota, which is about 35 miles southeast of Bismarck. Topographical landforms of the area include Missouri Coteau and Missouri River Slope. Precipitation averages just under 16 inches per year. Approximately 68 percent of the land in the three county area remains virgin sod - native mixed-grass prairie. The dominant land use is cattle grazing. The Coteau wetlands found in the northeastern portion of the Wetland Management District are classic prairie potholes of various sizes and types that are prime duck production habitat. These areas, when wet, are very productive. Soils in this area are generally deep and quite productive. Due to the rolling nature of the landscape on the Coteau, a lot of the land is also characterized as highly erodible. Conversely, many of the wetlands on Missouri River Slope portion of the Wetland Management District are large semi-permanent and permanent alkali wetlands. There are 21 wetland sites on the Missouri River Slope that have a history of periodic avian botulism outbreaks. These areas occasionally present localized problems for significant numbers of migratory birds. Soils on the Missouri River Slope are characteristically shallow with high proportions of sand and gravel. Much of the land is highly erodible. Since 1985, substantial land acreage in the three county area that was once farmed has been retired to Conservation Reserve Program grasslands. The program has assisted in restoring waterfowl populations for many species in the Wetland Management District which exceed the highest level ever recorded since surveys began.
