= Block Island National Wildlife Refuge =

Protected area in Rhode Island, United States

- IUCN category IV (habitat/species management area)
- Location within Rhode Island Location within the United States
- Location: Washington County, Rhode Island, United States
- Nearest city: New Shoreham, Rhode Island
- Coordinates: 41.22371°N 71.57533°W
- Area: 127 acres (0.51 km^{2})
- Established: 1973
- Governing body: U.S. Fish and Wildlife Service
- Website: Block Island National Wildlife Refuge

Located approximately 12 miles (19 km) offshore on picturesque Block Island, the Block Island National Wildlife Refuge provides crucial habitat for wildlife, and a place for people to appreciate the natural environment of the island. The refuge was established in 1973 with the transfer of 28 acres (110,000 m^{2}) from the U.S. Coast Guard, and has grown to its current size of 127 acres (0.51 km^{2}) today.

Block Island National Wildlife Refuge is administered as part of the Rhode Island National Wildlife Refuge Complex, which manages all five of the National Wildlife Refuges in Rhode Island, and is headquartered in Charlestown, Rhode Island.

Situated along the Atlantic Flyway, Block Island is one of the most important migratory bird habitats on the east coast. Many songbirds "overfly" the mainland and stopover on Block Island before continuing their migration. Hundreds of "birders" visit the refuge each fall to watch migration.

The refuge also provides habitat for the endangered American burying beetle, supporting the only population of this species known east of the Mississippi River. Piping plovers, a threatened species, occur in the refuge, as do four other state species of concern. The refuge is also home to the largest gull colony in Rhode Island.
