= West Tennessee National Wildlife Refuge Complex =

Wildlife refuge

West Tennessee National Wildlife Refuge Complex is a National Wildlife Refuge complex in the state of Tennessee.

== Refuges within the complex ==
- Chickasaw National Wildlife Refuge
- Lake Isom National Wildlife Refuge
- Lower Hatchie National Wildlife Refuge
- Reelfoot National Wildlife Refuge
