= North Carolina Coastal Plain National Wildlife Refuge Complex =

National Wildlife Refuge complex in North Carolina, United States

The North Carolina Coastal Plain National Wildlife Refuge Complex is an administrative organization that manages U.S. Fish and Wildlife Service wildlife refuges in eastern North Carolina. The complex includes"

- Alligator River National Wildlife Refuge
- Currituck National Wildlife Refuge
- Mackay Island National Wildlife Refuge
- Pea Island National Wildlife Refuge
- Pocosin Lakes National Wildlife Refuge
- Roanoke River National Wildlife Refuge

The complex headquarters and visitor center is in the Alligator River refuge headquarters on Roanoke Island.
