= South Carolina Lowcountry National Wildlife Refuge Complex =

United States National Wildlife Refuge complex in South Carolina

The South Carolina Lowcountry National Wildlife Refuge Complex is an administrative organization that manages U.S. Fish and Wildlife Service wildlife refuges in eastern South Carolina. The complex includes:

- Cape Romain National Wildlife Refuge
- Waccamaw National Wildlife Refuge
- Mackay Island National Wildlife Refuge
- Santee National Wildlife Refuge
- Ernest F. Hollings ACE Basin National Wildlife Refuge

The complex headquarters and visitor center is in the Alligator River refuge headquarters on Roanoke Island.
