= Michigan Wetland Management District =

Area in the U.S.

- IUCN category Ib (wilderness area)
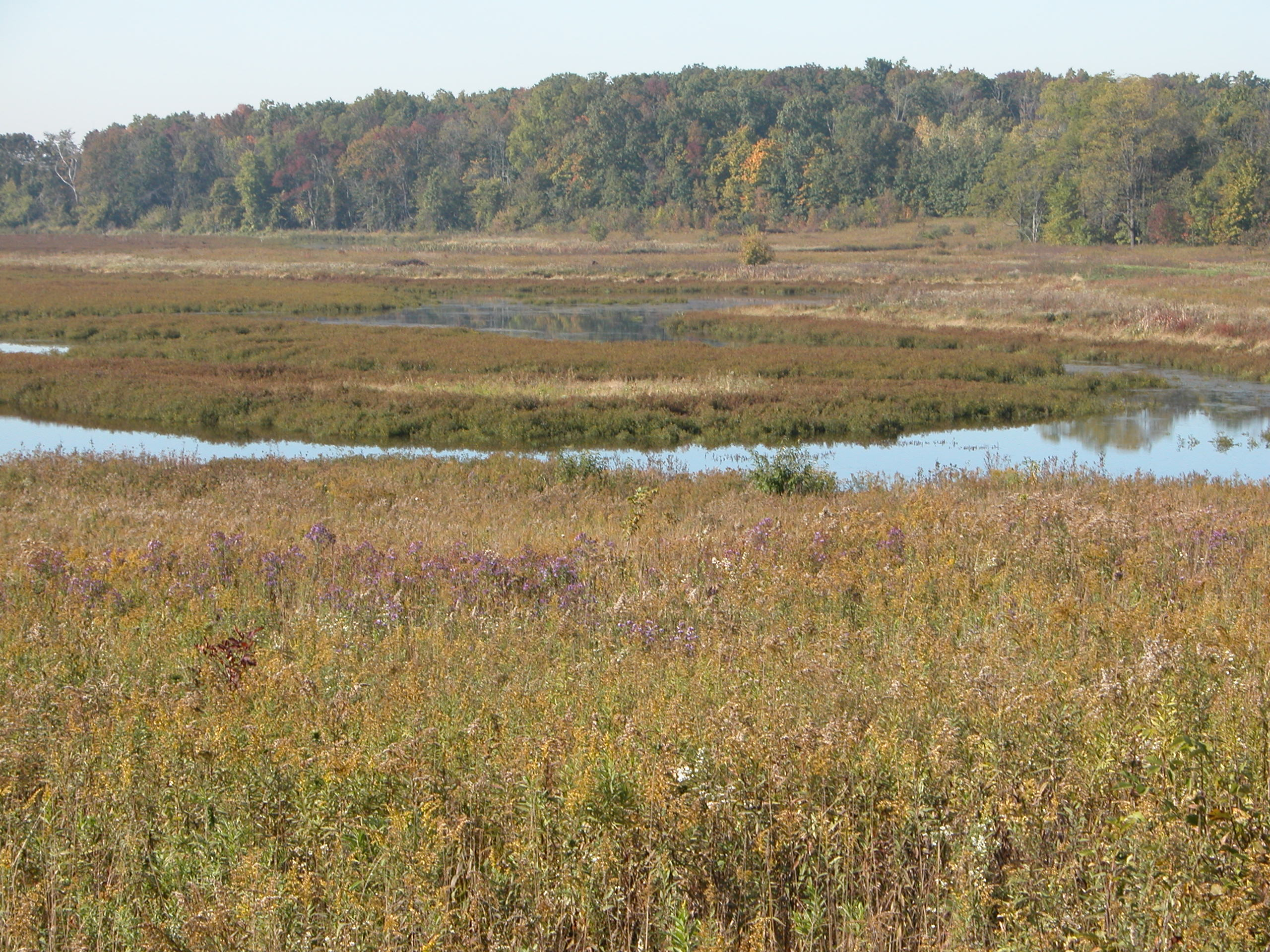

- Location within the United States
- Location: Portions of 14 counties of the southern Lower Peninsula of Michigan
- Nearest city: East Lansing (management offices)
- Coordinates: 42°45′52″N 84°30′19″W
- Governing body: U.S. Fish and Wildlife Service
- Website: Michigan Wetland Management District

The Michigan Wetland Management District consists of a 14-county area and includes three waterfowl production areas (WPAs): the 160-acre (0.65 km^{2}) Schlee WPA and the 138-acre (0.56 km^{2}) Mahan WPA in Jackson County and the 77-acre (310,000 m^{2}) Kinney WPA in Van Buren County. The Michigan Department of Natural Resources, Wildlife Division, oversees day-to-day management of these three areas through a partnership with the U.S. Fish and Wildlife Service.

Michigan has a fourth WPA, the 95-acre (380,000 m^{2}) Schoonover WPA, in Lenawee County. Staff of the Ottawa National Wildlife Refuge, located east of Toledo, Ohio, manages this WPA. All four sites are managed as a mixture of wetlands and grasslands to provide high-quality nesting and brood-rearing habitat for waterfowl and a variety of migratory songbirds.
