= Sheldon-Hart Mountain National Wildlife Refuge Complex =

The Sheldon-Hart Mountain National Wildlife Refuge Complex is a management unit of the United States Fish and Wildlife Service. It comprises two wildlife refuges, the Hart Mountain National Antelope Refuge in Oregon and the Sheldon National Wildlife Refuge in Nevada, that are managed as a single unit from an office in Lakeview, Oregon.

The two national wildlife refuges are noncontiguous but are managed together. The two refuges protect sections of a common ecoregion, the High Lava Plains ecoregion, and many of the flora and fauna found here are common to both refuges.

== See also ==
- Hart Mountain National Antelope Refuge
- Sheldon National Wildlife Refuge
