= Rhode Island National Wildlife Refuge Complex =

National Wildlife Refuge complex in Rhode Island

Rhode Island National Wildlife Refuge Complex is a National Wildlife Refuge complex in the state of Rhode Island. Its headquarters is in Charlestown, Rhode Island. Dotted along the Rhode Island's Atlantic coastline, the five refuges that make up the complex (Ninigret, Trustom Pond, John H. Chafee at Petaquamscutt Cove, Block Island and Sachuest Point) offer a wide variety of natural settings.

== History and Wildlife ==
All National Wildlife Refuges were established to conserve habitat for wildlife, but Rhode Island's five refuges were established specifically for migratory birds. Over 400 species of songbirds, shorebirds, waterfowl, and raptors use the refuges to rest and feed during spring and fall migrations. Year-round resident birds, as well as seasonal visitors such as the federally threatened piping plover, nest in the shelter of the refuges.

Birds are not the only attraction of Rhode Island's refuges. Uplands, lowlands, and coastal environments provide a home for many species of animals and offer any outdoor enthusiast a richness of plant life to explore. These protected lands are critical as increasing development encroaches on local, natural spaces.

== Refuges within the complex ==
- Block Island National Wildlife Refuge
- John H. Chafee National Wildlife Refuge
- Ninigret National Wildlife Refuge
- Sachuest Point National Wildlife Refuge
- Trustom Pond National Wildlife Refuge
