= Morris Wetland Management District =

Conservation management unit of local government in Minnesota, United States

Coordinates: 45°34′2″N 95°49′38″W

The Morris Wetland Management District includes 244 waterfowl production areas, encompassing over 50,000 acres (200 km^{2}) scattered throughout an eight-county area. Like other wetland management districts in the prairie states, the goal of the Morris District is to restore and protect sufficient wetland and grassland habitat to meet the needs of prairie wildlife, particularly breeding waterfowl, as well as provide places for public recreation.

The Morris District covers Big Stone, Chippewa, Lac qui Parle, Pope, Stevens, Swift, Traverse, and Yellow Medicine counties in western Minnesota. The district purchases land from willing sellers, manages scattered waterfowl production areas, and works with private landowners interested in improving their land for wildlife. The district also protects land through purchase of permanent conservation easements from willing landowners to protect wetlands and grasslands throughout the district.
