= Green River National Wildlife Refuge =

Protected area in Kentucky, United States

- Location within Kentucky Location within the United States
- Location: Henderson County, Kentucky, United States
- Nearest city: Evansville, Indiana
- Coordinates: 37.899808°N 87.527056°W
- Area: 10 acres (0.040 km^{2})
- Established: 2019
- Governing body: U.S. Fish and Wildlife Service
- Website: Green River National Wildlife Refuge

Green River National Wildlife Refuge is a National Wildlife Refuge located in Kentucky across from Evansville, Indiana where the Green River joins the Ohio River.

At its debut as the 568th National Wildlife Refuge in 2019, it consisted of 10 acres of land donated by the Southern Conservation Corp. The Fish and Wildlife Refuge has a goal of acquiring 24,000 acres in a 52,000 acre Conservation Partnership Area.
