= Featherstone National Wildlife Refuge =

United States National Wildlife Refuge in Virginia

- IUCN category IV (habitat/species management area)
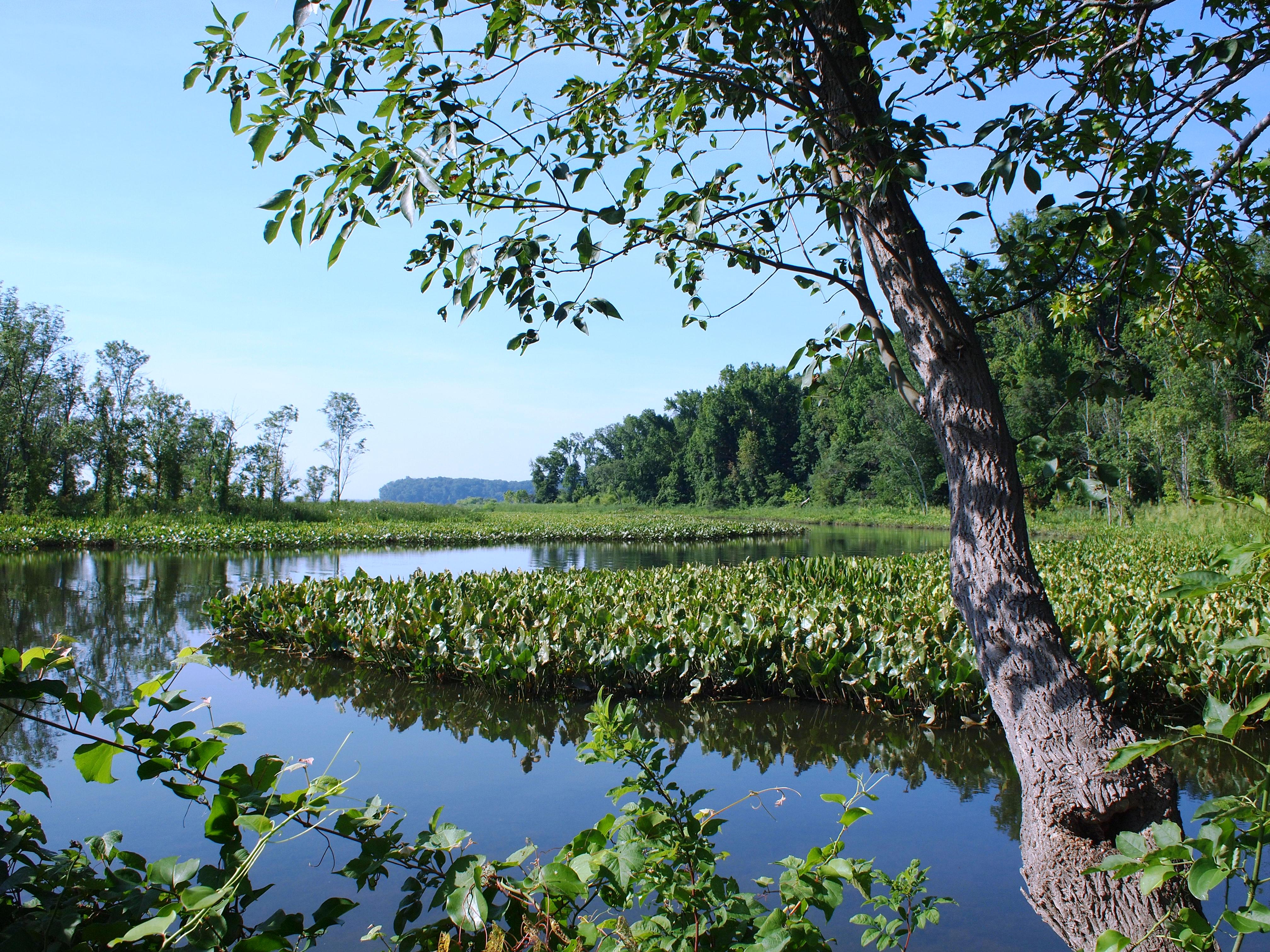
- Waterway in the refuge

- Location within Virginia Location within the United States
- Location: Prince William County, Virginia, United States
- Nearest city: Woodbridge, Virginia
- Coordinates: 38°35′40″N 77°15′20″W
- Area: 325 acres (1.32 km^{2})
- Established: 1970
- Governing body: U.S. Fish and Wildlife Service
- Website: Featherstone National Wildlife Refuge

The Featherstone National Wildlife Refuge is a National Wildlife Refuge located along the Potomac River in Virginia, at the point where it meets Neabsco Creek. The 325 acres (1.32 km^{2}) of tidal marsh has been administered by the United States Fish and Wildlife Service since 1970; currently, it is part of the Potomac River National Wildlife Refuge Complex. The refuge covers wetlands and woodlands, and has a railroad right-of-way bordering its western edge. It is currently accessible only by boat, but has been considered as a possible portion of the route for the Potomac Heritage National Scenic Trail.
