= Fergus Falls Wetland Management District =

Conservation management unit of local government in Minnesota, United States

Coordinates: 46°14′18″N 96°2′30″W

The Fergus Falls Wetland Management District is a protected area in the U.S. state of Minnesota. It was established in 1962 with the initiation of the Accelerated Small Wetlands Acquisition Program. It is located in west central Minnesota and includes the counties of Douglas, Grant, Otter Tail, Wadena and Wilkin.

The mission of the district is to identify, protect, and restore the tallgrass prairie/wetland ecosystem and associated habitats and to provide opportunities for outdoor recreation and environmental education. For this purpose, the district currently manages 216 waterfowl production areas totaling 44,499 acres (180.08 km^{2}), and 1,148 perpetual easements protecting 24,015 acres (97.19 km^{2}) of wetlands on private land. Thirty-nine perpetual wildlife habitat easements covering 4,185 acres (16.94 km^{2}) of wetland and grassland habitats on private land have also been obtained.

In addition the District manages the Prairie Wetlands Learning Center which has innovative environmental education programs and a wide array of visitor opportunities all focused on understanding prairie wetlands and grasslands.
