= Litchfield Wetland Management District =

Conservation management unit of local government in Minnesota, United States

Coordinates: 45°4′13″N 94°31′54″W

Litchfield Wetland Management District is located on the eastern edge of the Prairie Pothole Region in central Minnesota. More than 33,000 acres (130 km^{2}) of United States Fish and Wildlife Service-owned land and 8,000 acres (32 km^{2}) of wetland easements provide marsh, prairie, transition, and woodland habitats. District lands are located on over 150 waterfowl production areas scattered throughout seven counties. These areas vary greatly in size and vegetation and provide habitat for numerous plant and animal species.
