= Susquehanna River National Wildlife Refuge =

Wildlife reserve in Maryland, US

- IUCN category IV (habitat/species management area)
- Location within Maryland Location within the United States
- Location: Harford County, Maryland, United States
- Nearest city: Havre de Grace, Maryland
- Coordinates: 39°29′40″N 76°05′00″W
- Area: 3.79 acres (15,300 m^{2})
- Governing body: U.S. Fish and Wildlife Service
- Website: Susquehanna River National Wildlife Refuge

Susquehanna River National Wildlife Refuge is located on a small island 3.79 acres (15,300 m^{2}) in size located at the mouth of the Susquehanna River in Harford County, Maryland. It is a satellite refuge managed by Blackwater National Wildlife Refuge. In the 1920s, the island was used as a fish hatchery to produce such species as shad.

In the early 1940s, 13,363 acres (54.08 km^{2}) of water in the Upper Chesapeake Bay were closed by Presidential Proclamations to the hunting of migratory waterfowl. These water areas were designated as the Susquehanna National Wildlife Refuge. At the time of its establishment, the water areas known as the Susquehanna flats were covered with wild celery, pondweeds, redhead grass and other desirable waterfowl foods. Peak waterfowl population numbers included over 500,000 canvasback and redhead ducks and over 200,000 American wigeon. These rich areas of aquatic growth began declining in the 1960s due to changes in the water quality and quantity.

Development above the Conowingo Dam caused more rapid drainage and greater water flow through the dam. Currents in the upper Chesapeake Bay deposited heavy loads of silt in the Susquehanna flats area. What remained of the suitable waterfowl vegetation was destroyed when Hurricane Agnes moved through in 1972. Today, only a few thousand geese may be found around the refuge during the winter months.

Because of the dramatic decrease in waterfowl numbers and vegetation in the area, the Presidential Proclamations were lifted on September 1, 1978 and the waters were returned to the State of Maryland. Battery Island remains a part of the National Wildlife Refuge System. The refuge has a surface area of 3.79 acres (0.0153 km^{2}; 1.53 ha).
