= Umatilla National Wildlife Refuge =

Protected area in Oregon and Washington, US

- IUCN category IV (habitat/species management area)
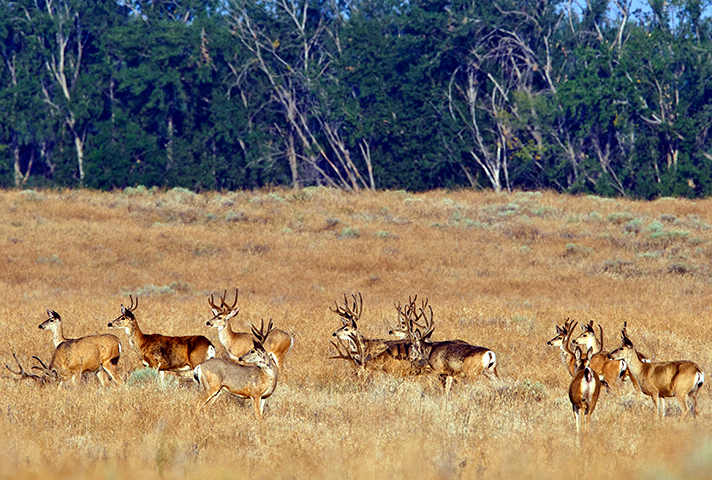
- Mule Deer

- Location within Washington (state)
- Location: Morrow County, Oregon; Benton County, Washington
- Nearest city: Hermiston, Oregon
- Coordinates: 45.8998551°N 119.6011369°W
- Area: 23,783 acres (9,625 ha)
- Established: 1969
- Governing body: U.S. Fish and Wildlife Service
- Website: Umatilla NWR

The Umatilla National Wildlife Refuge is located on and around the Columbia River about 15 miles (24 km) northwest of Hermiston, Oregon and includes 8,907 acres (3,605 ha) in Oregon, and 14,876 acres (6,020 ha) in Washington. It was established in 1969 to help mitigate habitat lose due to the flooding that occurred following the construction of the John Day Dam. The refuge is popular with birdwatchers and wildlife enthusiasts.

The refuge is a varied mix of open water, sloughs, shallow marsh, seasonal wetlands, cropland, islands, and shrub-steppe upland habitats. It is divided into six units—two in Oregon, three in Washington, and one in the middle of the Columbia River. The scarcity of wetlands and other natural habitats in this area make Umatilla National Wildlife Refuge vital to migrating waterfowl, bald eagles, colonial nesting birds, and other migratory and resident wildlife. It is strategically located within the Pacific Flyway to provide Arctic nesting geese and ducks a wintering site and a resting stopover.
