= Union Slough National Wildlife Refuge =

Protected area in Iowa, United States

- IUCN category IV (habitat/species management area)
- Location within Iowa Location within the United States
- Location: Kossuth County, Iowa, United States
- Nearest city: Bancroft, Iowa
- Coordinates: 43.28162°N 94.11495°W
- Area: 3,334 acres (13.49 km^{2})
- Established: 1938
- Governing body: U.S. Fish and Wildlife Service
- Website: Union Slough National Wildlife Refuge

Union Slough National Wildlife Refuge, located in Kossuth County, Iowa, was established in 1938 to provide a refuge and breeding ground for waterfowl and other migratory birds. The actual slough is all that remains of a pre-glacial riverbed, and its name is derived from the connection or "union" of two watersheds: the Blue Earth River of Minnesota and the East Fork of the Des Moines River. The terrain is nearly flat, allowing the flow of the water to be determined by the direction of the wind at times.

The refuge is on the eastern edge of the tallgrass prairie region of the Northern Great Plains, an area known for its agriculture. This 3,334-acre (13.49 km^{2}) refuge surrounded by a sea of corn and soybeans provides vital habitat for a variety of plants and animals dependent upon tallgrass prairie and wetland habitats.
