= Cedar Point National Wildlife Refuge =

Protected area in Ohio, United States

- IUCN category IV (habitat/species management area)
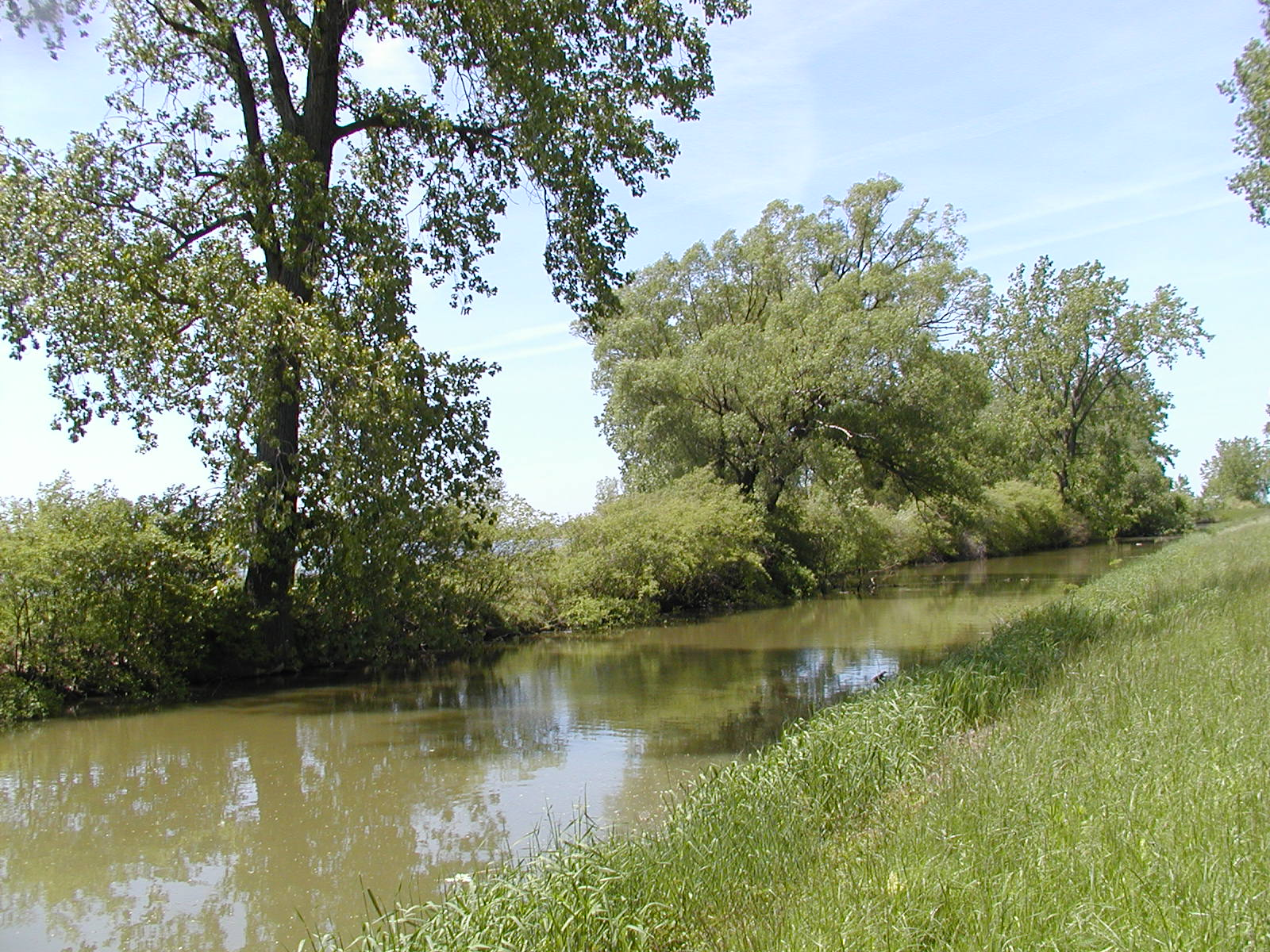
- Cedar Point National Wildlife Refuge

- Location within the United States Location within Ohio
- Location: Jerusalem Township, Lucas County, Ohio, United States
- Nearest city: Toledo, Ohio
- Coordinates: 41.68615°N 83.32187°W
- Area: 2,449.77 acres (9.9139 km^{2})
- Established: 1964
- Governing body: U.S. Fish and Wildlife Service
- Website: Cedar Point National Wildlife Refuge

Cedar Point National Wildlife Refuge was established in 1964 when the owners of the Cedar Point Shooting Club donated the land to the United States Fish and Wildlife Service. The refuge is now about 2,630 acres (10.6 km^{2}) of marsh that is divided into three pools. The largest one is almost 2,000 acres (8.1 km^{2}), it is the largest contiguous marsh in Ohio’s Lake Erie marshes. These marshes were once connected to the vast Great Black Swamp wetlands complex until it was drained in the 19th-century for farming.

This refuge is mostly closed off to the public, but between June and August, about 40 acres are open for fishing. Cedar Point National Wildlife Refuge is managed by the staff from Ottawa National Wildlife Refuge out in Oak Harbor, Ohio which is located off of Route 2. The purpose was to maintain the natural wildlife population on balance with the habitat available while decreasing and limiting exotic plant and animal species. This refuge is not to be used as a public park, campground or picnic area.

== Wildlife ==
This land provides an ideal habitat area for migratory birds and also is called home for other wildlife. While on the tour visitors have been able to see as up to 20 bald eagles. Native millet and smartweed provide an excellent food source for migrating waterfowl.

== History ==
Prior to being owned by the shooting club, in 1813 a group of men, women, and children used it as a point of shelter after coming from Michigan across the frozen Lake Erie, to escape the River Raisin Massacre, which was a series of conflicts in the Michigan territory from January 18–23, 1813 during the War of 1812. This war was between the United States and British/Native American alliance by the River Raisin, Frenchtown is now known as Monroe, Michigan.
