= Northern Tallgrass Prairie National Wildlife Refuge =

National wildlife refuge in Minnesota, United States

- IUCN category IV (habitat/species management area)
- Location within the United States
- Location: western Minnesota, northwestern Iowa, United States
- Coordinates: 43°44′01″N 96°16′26″W
- Area: 5,000 acres (20 km^{2})
- Established: 2000
- Governing body: U.S. Fish and Wildlife Service
- Website: Northern Tallgrass Prairie National Wildlife Refuge

The Northern Tallgrass Prairie National Wildlife Refuge is a National Wildlife Refuge located in Iowa and Minnesota in the United States. The United States Government established it to provide a means of working with individuals, groups, private organizations, and entities of the U.S. Government, Government of Iowa, and Government of Minnesota to permanently preserve a portion of the remnant tracts of northern tallgrass prairie in Iowa and Minnesota. The United States Fish and Wildlife Service is acquiring remnant prairie tracts for the refuge from willing private landowners through both conservation easements and fee title purchases.

Presently, the refuge is approximately 5,000 acres (20 km^{2}) in size and consists of 49 units. Forty-one units are protected by conservation easements totaling 2,500 acres (1,012 hectares). The eight units the U.S. Fish Wildlife Service owns account for nearly 3,000 acres (1,214 hectares), of which 2,451 acres (992 hectares) are in Minnesota and 352 acres (142 hectares) are in Iowa. Eight existing Fish and Wildlife Service Wetland Management District and National Wildlife Refuge offices scattered throughout the project area established for the refuge perform the field administration of all the units acquired for the refuge. When a tract of land is acquired for the refuge within the work area for one of these offices, the office assumes administrative authority for the tract. The project leader of Big Stone National Wildlife Refuge is responsible for overseeing the administration of the entire refuge.

== Touch the Sky Prairie ==
Touch the Sky Prairie is one unit of the Northern Tall Grass Prairie National Wildlife Refuge. The Touch the Sky Prairie Unit was created in 2001 and is in Rock County, Minnesota,a few miles west of Blue Mounds State Park. This remnant tall grass prairie consists of approximately 1,000 acres (405 hectares) of native prairie grasses, wildflowers, and a small segment of Beaver Creek and provides habitats for several bird species. A trail approximately 1 mile (1.6 km) in length leads through wildflowers and past a secluded waterfall.

== Prairie Smoke ==
The Prairie Smoke Unit is a remnant prairie unit in Kossuth County, Iowa, southeast of Algona. Waterfowl hunters use it during hunting season. The U.S. Fish and Wildlife Service purchased the Prairie Smoke Unit in 2002.
