= Willow Creek-Lurline Wildlife Management Area =

Willow Creek Wildlife Area in Northern California

Coordinates: 39.424°N 122.108°W

- IUCN category IV (habitat/species management area)
- Interactive map of Willow Creek-Lurline Wildlife Management Area
- Location: Glenn and Colusa Counties, California, United States
- Nearest city: Willows, California
- Area: 5,795 acres (23.45 km^{2})
- Established: 1985
- Governing body: U.S. Fish and Wildlife Service
- Website: Willow Creek-Lurline Wildlife Management Area

Willow Creek-Lurline Wildlife Management Area is located in the Sacramento Valley of California. The landscape is very flat, bordered by the Sierra and Coast ranges and surrounded by intensive agriculture (rice and other grains). The objective of this wildlife management area is to protect fall/winter habitat for waterfowl through the acquisition of conservation easements on privately owned wetlands. It is not open to the public.

Approximately 20,000 acres (81 km^{2}) lie within the approved acquisition boundary, of which about 12,000 acres (49 km^{2}) are privately owned for the purpose of waterfowl hunting. Conservation easements have been acquired on 6,000 acres (24 km^{2}), requiring landowners to maintain land in wetlands.

Central Valley wetlands are critical for Pacific Flyway waterfowl, with 44 percent wintering in the Sacramento Valley. As wetlands of the Central Valley have been lost (95 percent over the last 100 years), waterfowl have become increasingly dependent on the remaining wetlands in the Sacramento Valley.
