= Tybee National Wildlife Refuge =

United States National Wildlife Refuge in South Carolina

- IUCN category IV (habitat/species management area)
- Location within the United States
- Location: Jasper County, South Carolina, United States
- Nearest city: Savannah, Georgia
- Coordinates: 32.04187°N 80.91649°W
- Area: 100 acres (0.40 km^{2})
- Established: 1938
- Governing body: U.S. Fish and Wildlife Service
- Website: Tybee National Wildlife Refuge

Tybee National Wildlife Refuge was established on May 9, 1938, by an executive order of President Franklin D. Roosevelt, as a breeding area for migratory birds and other wildlife. Located in the mouth of the Savannah River, the 100-acre (0.40 km^{2}) refuge began as a 1-acre (4,000 m^{2}) oyster shoal, Oysterbed Island, used by the U.S. Army Corps of Engineers as a spoil disposal site to support their mandated harbor dredging activity. As a result, the majority of the refuge is now covered with sand deposits. The more stable portions of the island are densely covered with such woody species as eastern red cedar, wax myrtle, and groundsel. Saltwater marsh borders parts of the island.

The refuge is an important resting and feeding area for migratory birds including gulls, terns, neotropical migratory songbirds, and shorebirds. Least terns, black skimmers, Wilson's plovers, and several other shorebird species have nested on the spoil deposits on Tybee. During all seasons, the refuge's shoreline and open spoil deposits are used as resting sites for brown pelicans, gulls, and terns. Endangered species, including piping plovers and wood storks, have been observed on the refuge land, while shortnose sturgeon and manatees have been found in the waters bordering Tybee. With the use of telescopes, birdwatchers observe the refuge birdlife from levees located across the river within Fort Pulaski National Monument.
