= Bear Lake National Wildlife Refuge =

Protected area in Idaho, United States

- IUCN category IV (habitat/species management area)
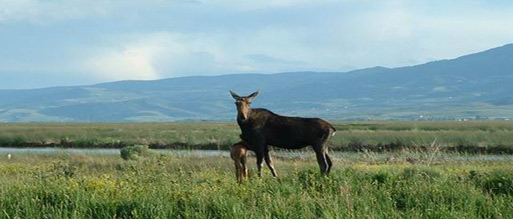
- A moose and her young in Bear Lake National Wildlife Refuge. USFWS photo.

- Location within the United States
- Location: Bear Lake County, Idaho, United States
- Nearest city: Montpelier, Idaho
- Coordinates: 42.16326°N 111.31242°W
- Area: 19,000 acres (77 km^{2})
- Established: 1968
- Governing body: U.S. Fish and Wildlife Service
- Website: Bear Lake National Wildlife Refuge

Bear Lake National Wildlife Refuge is located in southeast Idaho, seven miles (11 km) south of Montpelier. Surrounded by mountains, it lies in Bear Lake Valley at an elevation ranging from 5,925 feet (1,806 m) on the marsh to 6,800 feet (2,100 m) on the rocky slopes of Merkley Mountain. The refuge office is located in Montpelier.

The 19,000-acre (77 km^{2}) refuge is mainly made up of a bulrush marsh, open water, and flooded meadows of sedges, rushes, and grasses. Portions of the refuge include scattered grasslands and brush-covered slopes.

Bear Lake Refuge encompasses what is locally referred to as Dingle Swamp or Dingle Marsh. Along with Bear Lake proper, the marsh was once part of a larger prehistoric lake that filled the valley. As it drained and receded, Dingle Marsh was reduced from 25,000 acres (100 km^{2}) to less than 17,000 before it became part of the refuge.

== Fauna ==
White-faced ibis, sandhill cranes, swans, ducks, geese, and shorebirds reside in this wildlife refuge during its summer seasons. Moose can sometimes be found on this refuge, along with wintering mule deer. Smaller mammals often seen are muskrats, skunks, and cottontail rabbits.

== See also ==
- National Wildlife Refuge
