= Pickwick =

Pickwick may refer to:

== Arts ==
- The Pickwick Papers, a novel by Charles Dickens
  - Samuel Pickwick, its main character
- Pickwick (operetta), 1889 one-act operetta by Edward Solomon and F.C. Burnand, based on part of the Dickens novel
- Pickwick (musical), a theatre musical based on the Dickens novel
- Pickwick (film), a 1969 British television film, based on the musical
- Pickwick Theatre, Park Ridge, Illinois, United States
- Pickwick, a fictional dodo in the novels about Thursday Next by Jasper Fforde

=== Music ===
- Pickwick (band), an American rock band
- Pickwick Records, a record label, distributor and chain.

== Places ==
- Pickwick, Minnesota, United States
- Pickwick, Wiltshire, now part of Corsham, England
- Pickwick Dam, Tennessee, an unincorporated community in the United States
- Pickwick Island, an island near Antarctica
- Pickwick Landing State Park, Tennessee, United States
- Pickwick Landing Dam, Tennessee, United States
- Pickwick Lake, Tennessee, United States

== Other uses ==
- Pickwick Corporation, a defunct California business; bus line, manufacturer of early buses, hotels
- Pickwick (brand), a tea brand
- Pickwick (West Whiteland Township, Pennsylvania), a historic estate home
- Pickwick Cricket Club, Barbados
- Pickwick Mill, in Pickwick, Minnesota
- Pickwick Video Group, a home video division based in the United Kingdom first established in 1982
- Pickwickian syndrome, a medical disease named from the Dickens novel
- Don Pickwick (1925–2004), Welsh footballer
- Eleazer Pickwick (1748 or 1749–1837), British businessman
- Pickwick Book Shop, a defunct bookshop in Hollywood, California

== See also ==
- The Pickwick Papers (disambiguation)
