= Waterloo, Alabama =

- Town
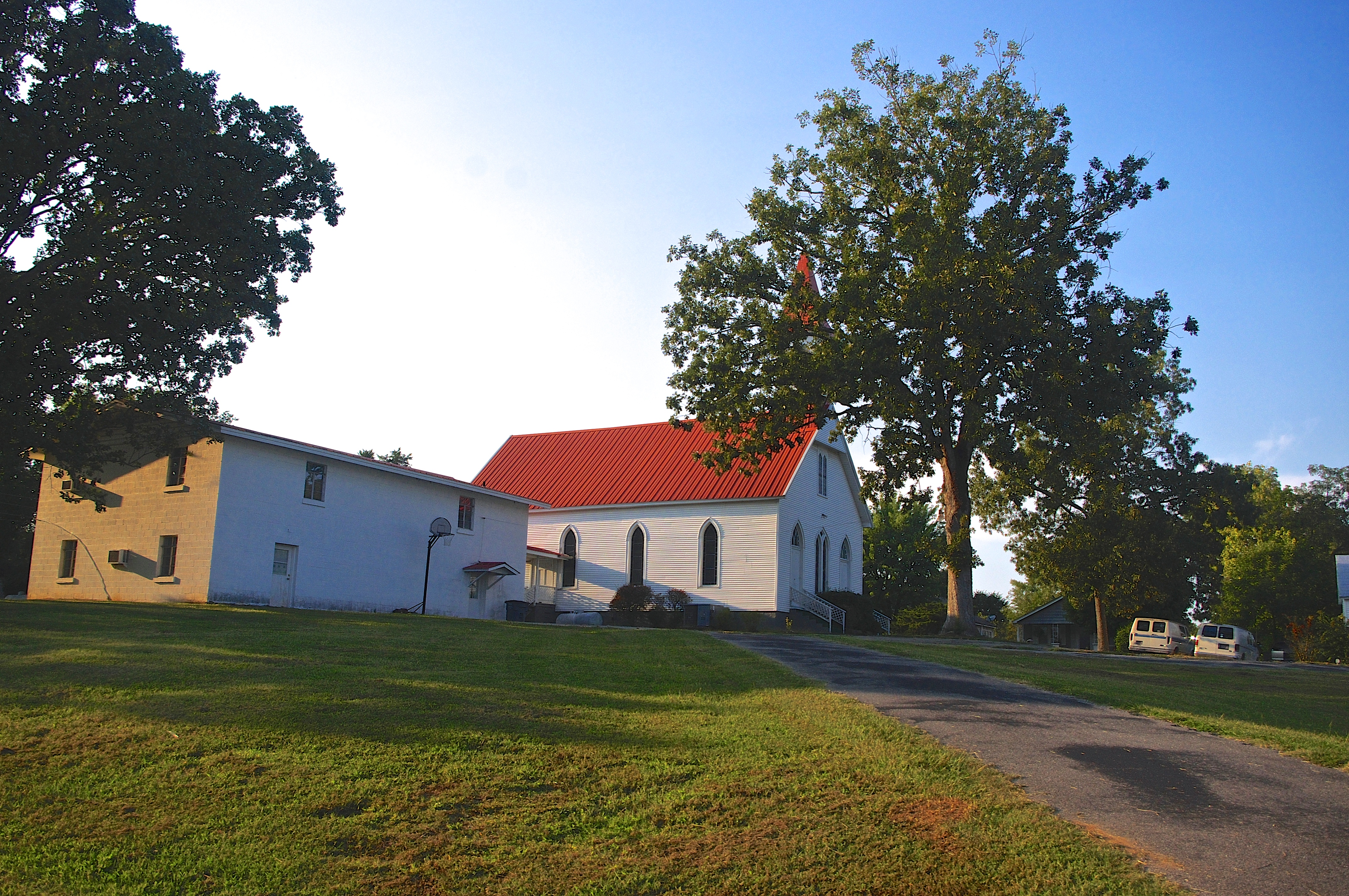
- Waterloo Methodist Church

- Location of Waterloo in Lauderdale County, Alabama.
- Coordinates: 34°55′02″N 88°03′56″W
- Country: United States
- State: Alabama
- County: Lauderdale
- Settled: 1824
- Incorporated: 1832

Area
  - Total: 0.80 sq mi (2.08 km^{2})
  - Land: 0.75 sq mi (1.94 km^{2})
  - Water: 0.054 sq mi (0.14 km^{2})
- Elevation: 443 ft (135 m)

Population (2020)
  - Total: 178
  - Density: 238.1/sq mi (91.94/km^{2})
- Time zone: UTC-6 (Central (CST))
  - Summer (DST): UTC-5 (CDT)
- ZIP code: 35677
- Area code: 256
- FIPS code: 01-80064
- GNIS feature ID: 2406837
- Website: www.waterlooalabama.com

Waterloo is a town in Lauderdale County, Alabama, United States. It is part of the Florence–Muscle Shoals metropolitan area, known as "The Shoals". As of the 2020 census, Waterloo had a population of 178. The town and surrounding area is served by Waterloo High School and by the Waterloo Volunteer Fire Department.

== History ==
The town was incorporated in 1832 on the banks of the Tennessee River. The name most likely commemorates the Battle of Waterloo. According to the 1910 U.S. Census, Waterloo was reincorporated in 1903.

In the 1930s, the town was moved to its current location when the Tennessee Valley Authority completed the Pickwick Landing Dam, which impounds Pickwick Lake. Waterloo has lost a large area of land to floods and later the construction of Pickwick Landing Dam.

In 1880, when it first appeared on the U.S. Census, and again from 1910 to 1940, it was the second largest community in Lauderdale County after Florence, reaching its zenith of 524 residents in 1940. It has since lost two-thirds of its population and since 1980, and ranks 8th and smallest of Lauderdale County's incorporated communities with 203 residents.

== Geography ==
Waterloo is located along the north shore of Pickwick Lake, a reservoir along the Tennessee River created by Pickwick Landing Dam approximately 20 miles (32 km) downstream. Second Creek, which flows from the north, empties into Pickwick Lake at Waterloo, creating a small inlet. The point at which the states of Alabama, Mississippi, and Tennessee meet is located several miles northwest of Waterloo. County Road 14 connects Waterloo with Florence to the east.

According to the U.S. Census Bureau, the town has a total area of 0.8 square miles (2.1 km^{2}), of which 0.75 square miles (1.9 km^{2}) is land and 0.05 square miles (0.13 km^{2}) (6.17%) is water.

=== Climate ===
The climate in this area is characterized by hot, humid summers and generally mild to cool winters. According to the Köppen Climate Classification system, Waterloo has a humid subtropical climate, abbreviated "Cfa" on climate maps.

== Demographics ==
Historical population
Census	Pop.	Note	%±
1880	196		—
1910	435		—
1920	415		−4.6%
1930	497		19.8%
1940	524		5.4%
1950	327		−37.6%
1960	215		−34.3%
1970	262		21.9%
1980	260		−0.8%
1990	250		−3.8%
2000	208		−16.8%
2010	203		−2.4%
2020	178		−12.3%
U.S. Decennial Census; 2013 Estimate

=== 2020 census ===
Waterloo racial composition
Race	Num.	Perc.
White (non-Hispanic)	174	97.75%
Native American	1	0.56%
Other/Mixed	2	1.12%
Hispanic or Latino	1	0.56%

As of the 2020 United States census, there were 178 people, 68 households, and 43 families residing in the town.

=== 2000 census ===
In the 2000 US census, there were 208 people, 94 households, and 67 families residing in the town. The population density was 273.1 inhabitants per square mile (105.4/km^{2}). There were 145 housing units at an average density of 190.4 per square mile (73.5/km^{2}). The racial makeup of the town was 97.12% White, 1.44% from other races, and 1.44% from two or more races. 1.44% of the population were Hispanic or Latino of any race.

There were 94 households, out of which 23.4% had children under the age of 18 living with them, 56.4% were married couples living together, 12.8% had a female householder with no husband present, and 28.7% were non-families. 24.5% of all households were made up of individuals, and 14.9% had someone living alone who was 65 years of age or older. The average household size was 2.21 and the average family size was 2.60.

In the town, the population was spread out, with 17.3% under the age of 18, 9.1% from 18 to 24, 26.0% from 25 to 44, 29.3% from 45 to 64, and 18.3% who were 65 years of age or older. The median age was 44 years. For every 100 females, there were 98.1 males. For every 100 females age 18 and over, there were 89.0 males.

The median income for a household in the town was $25,536, and the median income for a family was $31,000. Males had a median income of $33,750 versus $18,750 for females. The per capita income for the town was $15,167. About 11.3% of families and 9.7% of the population were below the poverty line, including 3.2% of those under the age of eighteen and 19.0% of those 65 or over.

== Politics ==
Waterloo is in:

- Alabama's 5th congressional district
- Alabama State House of Representatives district 2
- Alabama State Senate district 1

== Attractions and events ==
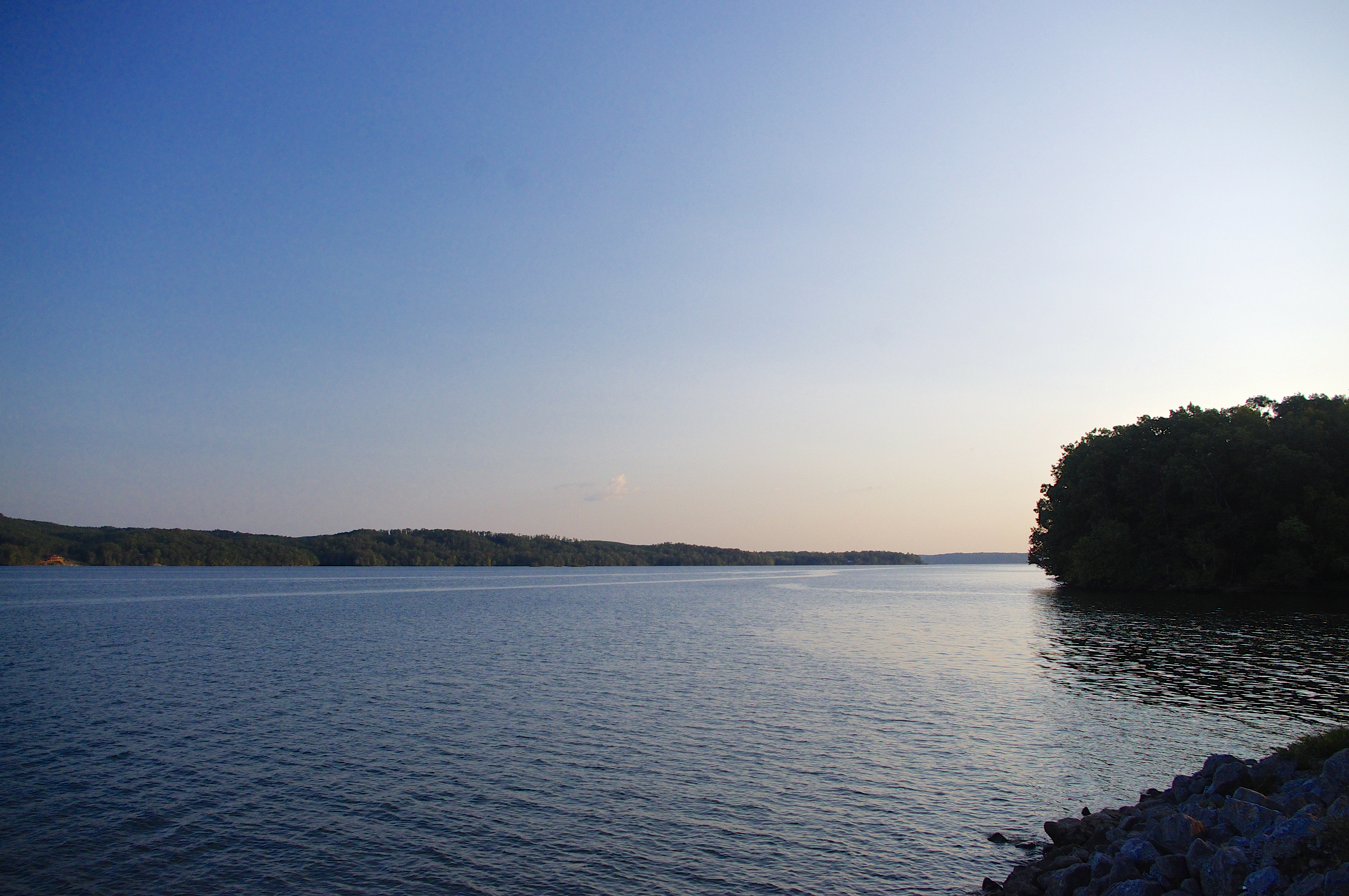
Pickwick Lake at Waterloo

- Trail of Tears Commemorative Motorcycle Ride, Waterloo, Alabama is the Official End of The Trail. The ride commemorates the final point at which area Cherokee Native Americans were embarked to Oklahoma and the Midwest by the Indian Removal Act of 1830.
- Waterloo is a stop on the North Alabama Birding Trail. The area is renowned for the nearby bald eagle population.
- The town is adjacent to the Lauderdale Wildlife Management Area.
- Two primitive campgrounds managed by the Tennessee Valley Authority are in the city limits. Waterloo is located 11 miles (18 km) west of the Natchez Trace Parkway.

== Notable person ==
- Samuel A. Shelton, former U.S. Representative from Missouri
