= North Alabama Birding Trail =

Wildlife trail in North Alabama

The North Alabama Birding Trail is a wildlife trail that is a series of sites that have been chosen for their great birdwatching opportunities. The trail has 50 sites located in 13 counties in North Alabama.

== History ==
The trail was funded by a US$280,000 federal matching grant with US$210,000 provided by the federal government and US$70,000 of matching funds from the chambers of commerce or convention and visitors bureaus of the 13 counties, the Wheeler National Wildlife Refuge Association, the Tennessee Valley Authority, and several corporate sponsors. The trail was dedicated on September 30, 2005.

== Sites ==
Information below is presented in more detail in the North Alabama Birding Trail: Visitor Guide (and is the source material for table).

Site number	Name	Coordinates
1	Mallard Fox Creek Wildlife Management Area - kiosk site	34.6594°N 87.1104°W
2	Wheeler Dam South Landing	34.7940°N 87.3872°W
3	Joe Wheeler State Park	34.8360°N 87.3680°W
4	Town Creek Marsh	34.7700°N 87.4410°W
5	Leighton Ponds	34.7230°N 87.4770°W
6	Wilson Dam Visitor Center - kiosk site	34.7934°N 87.6320°W
7	Wilson Dam Rockpile Recreation Area	34.7930°N 87.6320°W
8	Tennessee Valley Authority Reservation	34.7803°N 87.6546°W
9	Key Cave National Wildlife Refuge - kiosk site	34.7630°N 87.7818°W
10	Natchez Trace Parkway Rock Springs Nature Trail	34.8580°N 87.9060°W
11	Waterloo	34.9310°N 88.0391°W
12	Natchez Trace Parkway Colbert Ferry	34.8400°N 87.9452°W
13	Freedom Hills Wildlife Management Area Walking Trail	34.6480°N 87.9902°W
14	Bankhead National Forest - Central Firetower - Kiosk Site	34.3452°N 87.3393°W
15	Bankhead National Forest Sipsey Wilderness Trailhead	34.2854°N 87.3986°W
16	Wheeler National Wildlife Refuge Visitor Center	34.5480°N 86.9505°W
17	Decatur Hospitality Nature Park - Kiosk Site	34.6277°N 86.9580°W
18	BP-Amoco Environmental Trail	34.6300°N 87.0525°W
19	3M Wildlife Area - Kiosk Site	34.6329°N 87.0516°W
20	Wheeler NWR - White Springs Dike	34.6290°N 87.9520°W
21	Swan Creek Wildlife Management Area	34.6780°N 87.0033°W
22	Round Island Recreation Area	34.6850°N 87.0705°W
23	Wheeler NWR - Arrowhead Landing	34.6050°N 86.8922°W
24	Wheeler NWR - Beaverdam Peninsula Tower	34.6110°N 86.8537°W
25	Wheeler NWR - Beaverdam Swamp Boardwalk	34.6490°N 86.8190°W
26	Wheeler NWR - Blackwell Swamp	34.5770°N 86.7822°W
27	Winfred Thomas Agricultural Research Station	34.9025°N 86.5596°W
28	Madison County Public Lake	34.8115°N 86.3940°W
29	Monte Sano State Park	34.7470°N 86.5104°W
30	Hays Nature Preserve	34.6420°N 86.4706°W
31	Wheeler NWR - Cave Springs	34.5470°N 86.8510°W
32	Hurricane Creek Park - Kiosk Site	34.2860°N 86.8950°W
33	Wheeler NWR - Dancy Bottoms Nature Trail	34.5070°N 86.9552°W
34	Lake Guntersville State Park, Town Creek and Drive - Kiosk Site	34.3697°N 86.2169°W
35	Guntersville Peninsula	34.3630°N 86.2916°W
36	Guntersville Dam South	34.4250°N 86.3930°W
37	Guntersville Dam North	34.4250°N 86.3930°W
38	Goose Pond Colony	34.5743°N 86.0807°W
39	North Sauty Creek WMA/Sauta Cave NWR	34.6190°N 86.1312°W
40	Roy B. Whitaker Paint Rock River Preserve - kiosk site	34.6725°N 86.3282°W
41	Skyline Wildlife Management Area	34.8534°N 86.1310°W
42	Mud Creek Wildlife Management Area	34.7768°N 85.8593°W
43	Stevenson Town Park	34.8502°N 85.8342°W
44	Russell Cave National Monument	34.9770°N 85.8056°W
45	Gorham's Bluff/Coon Gulf	34.7350°N 85.8347°W
46	DeKalb County Public Lake	34.5764°N 85.8060°W
47	DeSoto State Park - Azalea Cascade Trail	34.4990°N 85.6178°W
48	Little River Canyon National Preserve Drive	34.3510°N 85.6752°W
49	Buck's Pocket State Park, Morgan's Cove, and South Sauty Creek	34.4648°N 86.0918°W
50	Murphy Hill	34.4729°N 86.1722°W

== See also ==
- North Alabama Birding Trail - Alabama Birding Trail website
