= Flint River (Alabama) =

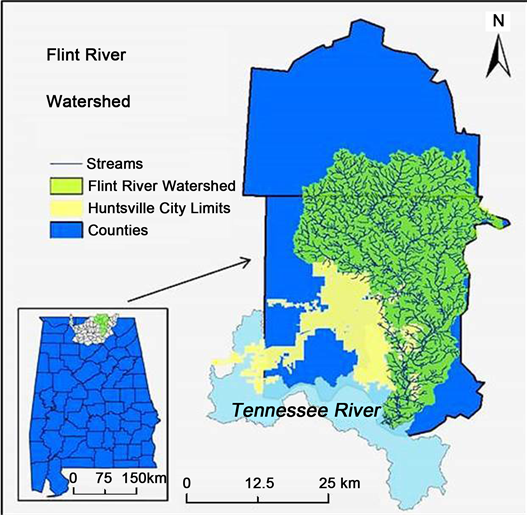
- Flint River watershed

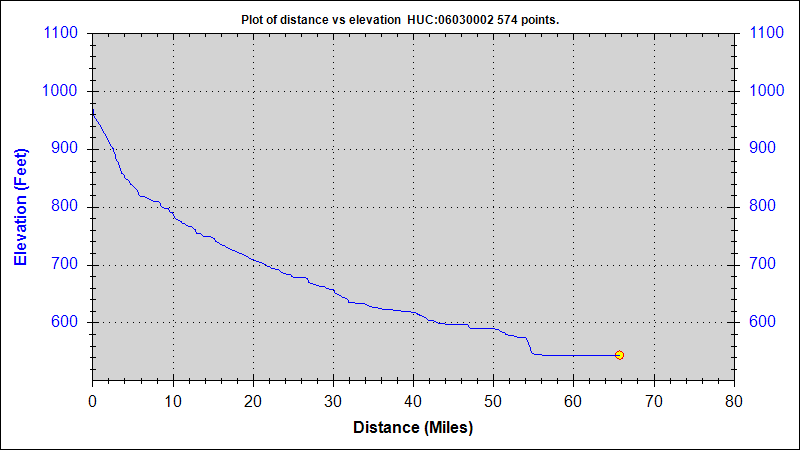
- Elevation Profile vs River Length

Location
- Country: United States
- States: Alabama and Tennessee

Physical characteristics
- Source
  - location: Lincoln County, Tennessee
  - coordinates: 35°05′06″N 86°23′34″W
  - elevation: 960 ft (290 m)
- Mouth
  - location: Tennessee River
  - coordinates: 34°30′10″N 86°31′45″W
  - elevation: 550 ft (170 m)
- Length: 65.7 mi (105.7 km)
- Basin size: 568 sq mi (1,470 km^{2})
- Discharge
  - location: Brownsboro, Alabama
  - average: 642 cu ft/s (18.2 m^{3}/s)

The Flint River, 65.7 mi (105.7 km) long and draining an area of 568 sq mi (1,470 km^{2}), is a tributary to the Tennessee River. The river rises in Lincoln County, Tennessee, and flows south into Madison County, Alabama, where most of the river's watershed (342 sq. mi.) is located. The land within this watershed is predominantly agricultural and has experienced significant recent residential growth from the city of Huntsville. The U.S. Geological Survey National Water-Quality Assessment Program is currently investigating water quality in the lower Tennessee River basin with several monitoring activities targeted in the Flint River Basin.

== Geology ==
The Flint River rises on the southwestern fringe of the Cumberland Escarpment and primarily drains the plains that have been created by the erosion of this fringe of the Appalachians. Due to the sedimentary nature of this escarpment, which consists primarily of sandstone, star blue quartz can be found in small quantities in the stream bed because it easily survives weathering of its encasing stone.

== Recreation ==
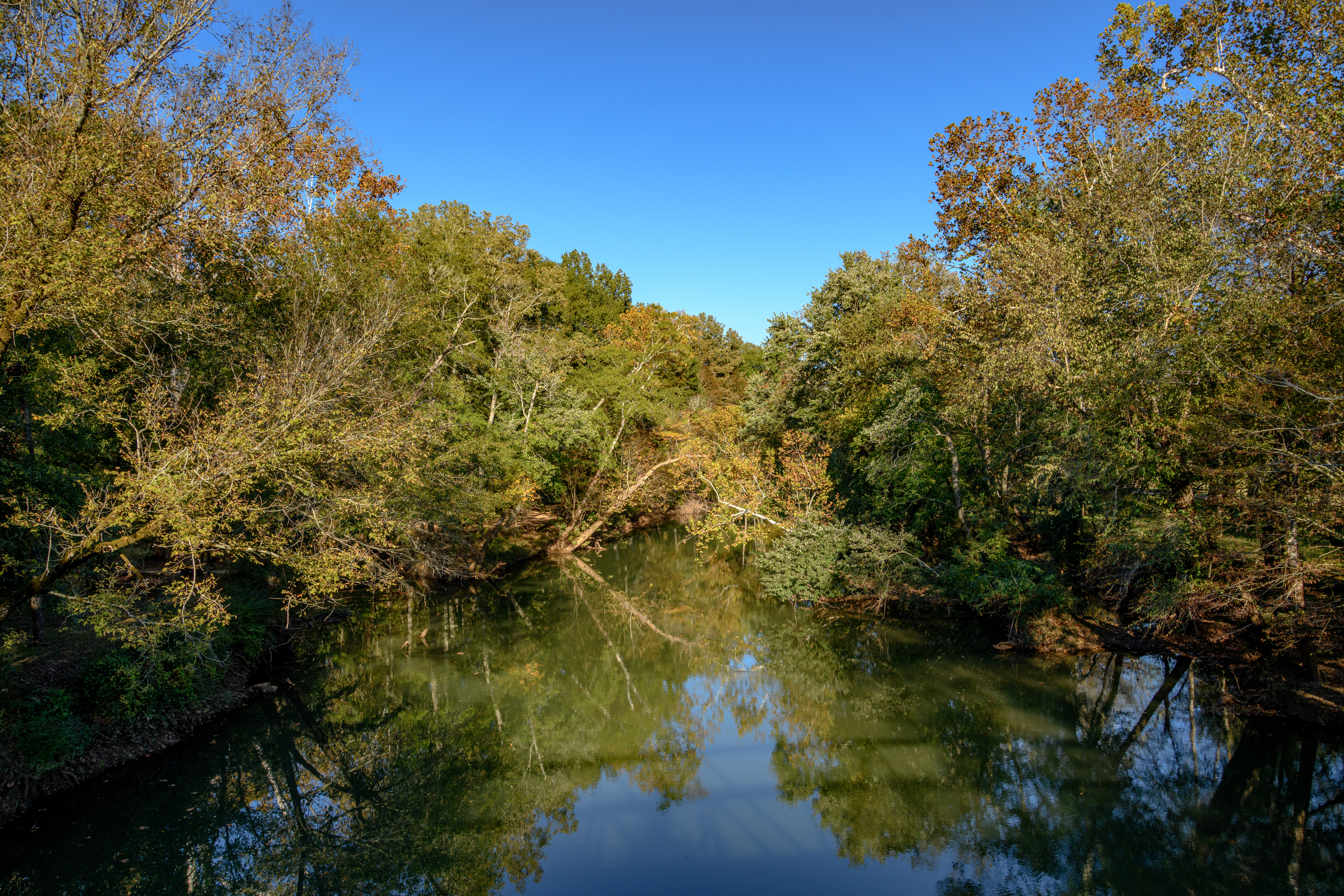
The Flint River in the Hays Nature Preserve.

The Hays Nature Preserve offers trails and greenways along the portion of the river running through Huntsville. Much of the river's course is suitable for canoeing and kayaking, and it is included as a route of the Alabama Scenic River Trail.

== See also ==
- List of rivers of Alabama
- List of rivers of Tennessee
