= Wheeler National Wildlife Refuge =

National wildlife refuge near Decatur, Alabama

- IUCN category IV (habitat/species management area)
- Location within Alabama Location within the United States
- Location: Morgan, Limestone, and Madison Counties, Alabama, United States
- Nearest city: Decatur, Alabama
- Coordinates: 34°33′28″N 86°57′06″W
- Area: 34,430.66 acres (139.3359 km^{2})
- Established: July 7, 1938
- Visitors: 700,000 (in 2003)
- Governing body: U.S. Fish and Wildlife Service
- Website: Wheeler NWR

The Wheeler National Wildlife Refuge is a 35,000-acre (140 km^{2}) national wildlife refuge (NWR) located along the Tennessee River near Decatur, Alabama. Named after Major General Joseph Wheeler, it was established to provide a habitat for wintering and migrating birds in the Eastern United States.

Of the 35,000 acres of the refuge, about 4,085 acres (16.53 km^{2}) are located within Redstone Arsenal. Around 1,500 acres (6.1 km^{2}) of the Redstone Arsenal land are administered by the Marshall Space Flight Center.

Wheeler NWR is charged with the administration of four other NWRs, including Fern Cave, Key Cave, Sauta Cave and Watercress Darter National Wildlife Refuge. Until recently, Wheeler NWR also administered the Cahaba River National Wildlife Refuge (now administered by the Mountain Longleaf National Wildlife Refuge).

== History ==
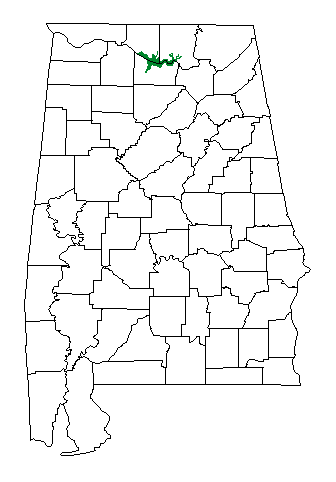
Location of Wheeler NWR in Alabama

In 1934, the Tennessee Valley Authority began purchasing land as a bed for and buffer strip for Wheeler Reservoir. By 1936, the Tennessee River was impounded for flood control with the nearby Wheeler Dam providing hydroelectric power.

In 1938, the refuge was established by executive order of President Franklin D. Roosevelt and became the first NWR to be overlain on a multipurpose reservoir. TVA impounded shallow backwater areas of the reservoir to control the mosquito population. By pumping these areas dry in the spring and summer, the mosquito-breeding habitat was eliminated.

These impounded areas also produced natural waterfowl foods such as wild millet, smartweed, sedges, and other seed-bearing grasses that attracted waterfowl when the area was reflooded in the winter. This food source allows the refuge to be the home of Alabama's largest duck population and its only significant concentration of wintering Canada geese.

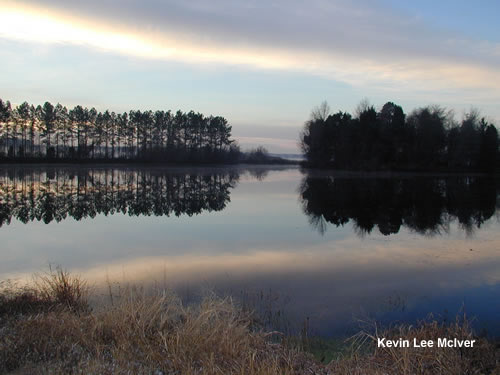
Wheeler NWR

In 1940, a presidential proclamation renamed Wheeler Migratory Waterfowl Refuge to its present name.

In 1941, for national security reasons, about 4,085 acres (16.53 km^{2}) were included inside the Redstone Arsenal boundary. Currently, about 1,500 of the 4,085 acres (16.53 km^{2}) are administered by NASA's Marshall Space Flight Center.

== Topography ==
Located along the Tennessee River, the refuge provides a mix of bottomland hardwoods, mixed hardwood and pine uplands, shallow-water embayments, and agricultural fields. Of the refuge's 35,000 acres, 19,000 acres (77 km^{2}) are land and 16,000 acres (65 km^{2}) are covered by water. The area consists of some 10,000 acres (40 km^{2}) of forested wetlands and upland hardwoods, with main species consisting of red and white oaks, hickories, poplar, ash, and tupelo. 3,000 acres (12 km^{2}) are pine plantations, much of which are subjected to sanitation cuts in the mid-1990s due to Ips beetle and pine beetle infestations; and 4,000 to 5,000 acres (16 to 20 km^{2}) are farmland, with the remainder including open shelves, rocket test ranges, and other areas. This mix of habitat provides for a wealth of wildlife diversity on the refuge.

== Wildlife and protected species ==
Wheeler NWR has supported up to 60,000 geese and 100,000 ducks, although recently these levels have declined to around 30,000 geese and 60,000 ducks. Since 1990, winter goose populations have dropped significantly due to many different factors, and below 15,000 from 1990 to 1995 and about 2,500-5,500 in the last few years. Snow geese are now the most prominent component of the winter goose population, peaking near 1,500-3,200 in recent years.

In addition to migratory birds, the refuge hosts 115 species of fishes, 74 species of reptiles and amphibians, 47 species of mammals, and 288 different species of songbirds. Some common mammals include squirrels, raccoons, opossums, rabbits, and deer. About 10 endangered species live on the refuge; also a small population of American alligators are present within the reserve; they were reintroduced into the area following historical extirpation from northern Alabama.

== Facilities ==
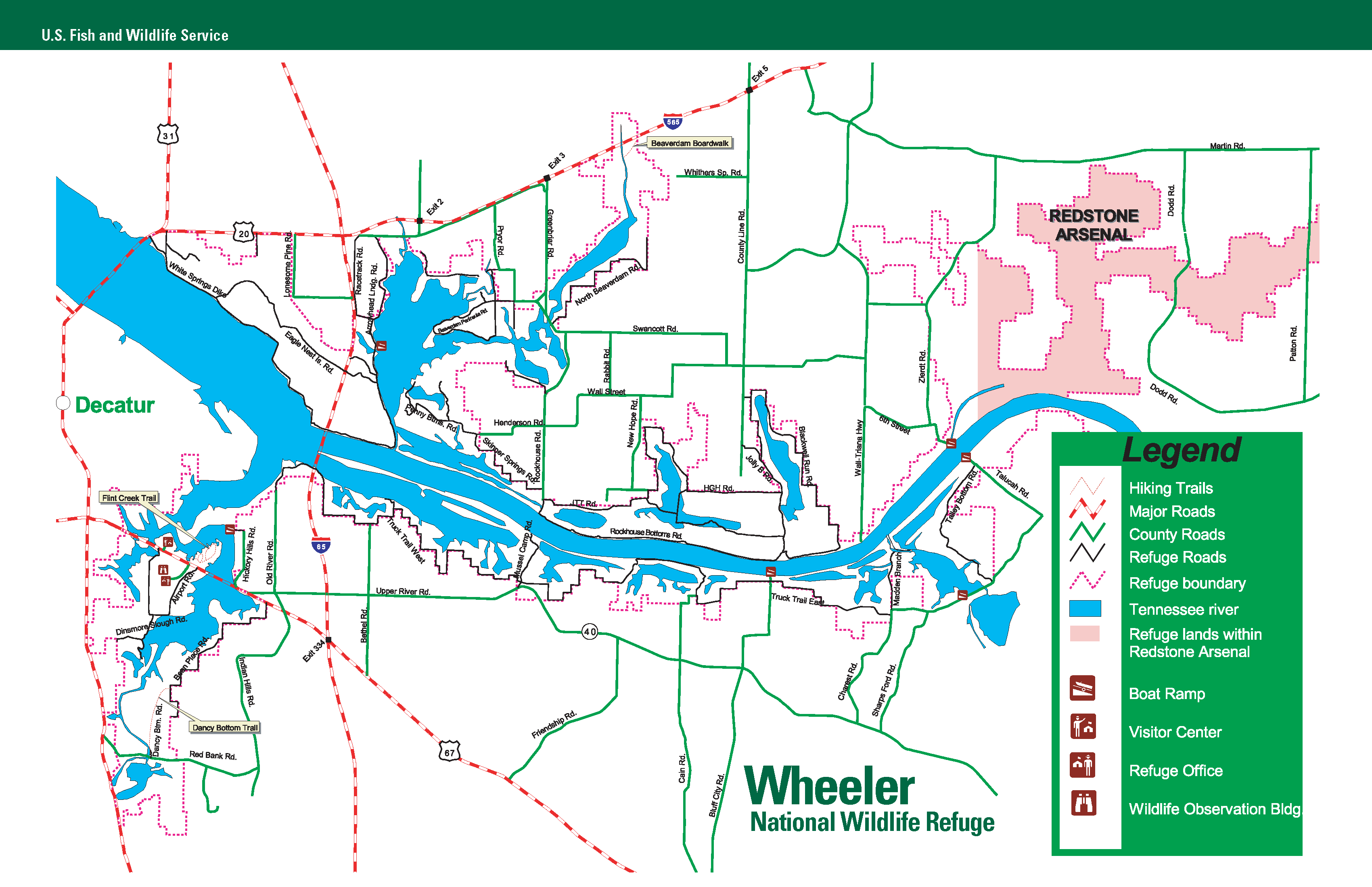
Map of Wheeler NWR

Wheeler NWR offers five hiking trails ranging in length from 200 yd (180 m) to 4 mi (6.4 km), providing opportunities to view wildlife in a wide variety of habitats. Additionally, six improved boat launch areas provide access to the Tennessee River.

=== Hunting and fishing ===
Fishing is very popular at Wheeler NWR with an estimated 200,000 annual visitors. The Tennessee River provides excellent fishing opportunities for bass, sunfish, crappie, sauger, and catfish. Public hunting is permitted on roughly 18,000 acres (73 km^{2}).

=== Wildlife observation ===
The main visitor center provides an overlook of a waterfowl impoundment for birdwatching and the opportunity to see red-tailed hawks. Several other spotting scope stations are set up throughout the refuge. Additionally, a wildlife observation tower located on the north side of the refuge provides an elevated view of the Beaverdam peninsula, an area of the refuge managed primarily for Canada geese. Each winter, the area is filled with thousands of sandhill cranes. The endangered whooping crane has been spotted regularly each winter for the last decade, sometimes numbering over 10. Over 200 species of birds have been identified here on the EBird Hotspot list.

Wheeler NWR has eight sites on North Alabama Birding Trail, which is the most sites on the trail within any public land area.

== Annual events ==
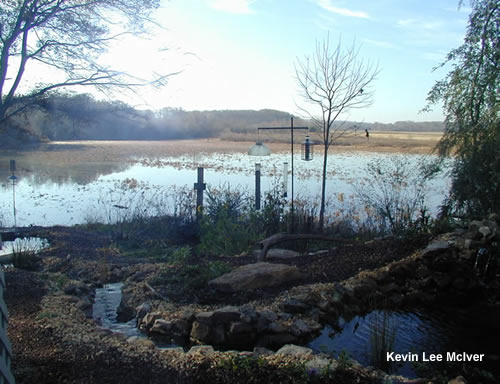
Wheeler NWR

- March: Federal Junior Duck Stamp Contest
- May: Youth Fishing Rodeo, FAWN Festival
- Summer: Wheeler Day Camps
- August: United Way's Day of Caring Fishing Rodeo
- October: Wet and Wild Festival, Southern Wildlife Festival

== See also ==
- List of National Wildlife Refuges
