= Russell Cave National Monument =

310 acres in Alabama (US) managed by the National Park Service

- IUCN category III (natural monument or feature)
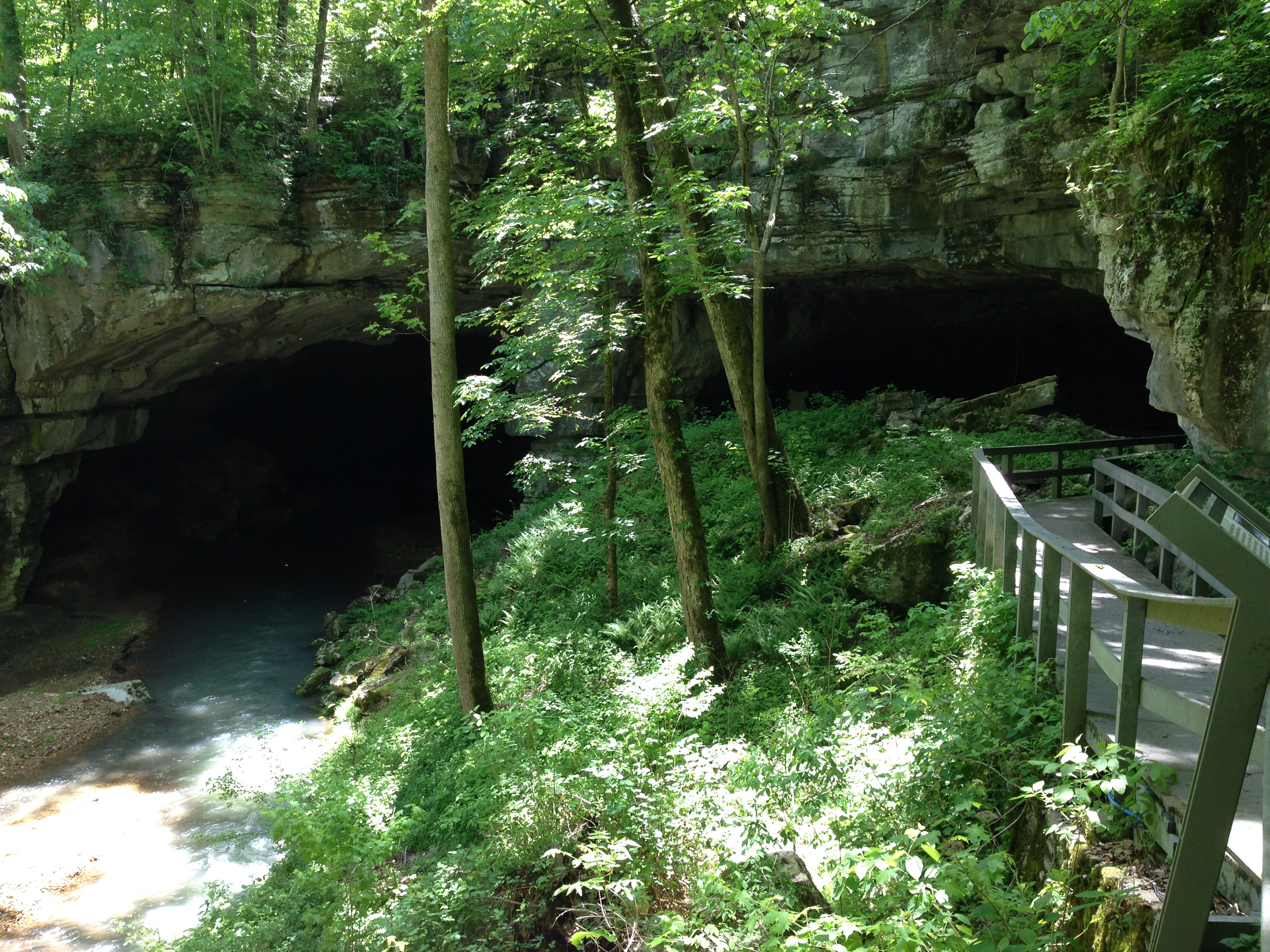

- Location within Alabama Location within the United States
- Interactive map of Russell Cave National Monument
- Location: Jackson County, Alabama, United States
- Nearest city: Bridgeport, Alabama
- Coordinates: 34°58′36″N 85°48′51″W
- Area: 310 acres (130 ha)
- Created: May 11, 1961
- Visitors: 8,678 (in 2023)
- Governing body: National Park Service
- Website: Russell Cave National Monument

U.S. National Register of Historic Places
- Designated: October 15, 1966
- Reference no.: 66000150

Russell Cave National Monument is a U.S. national monument in northeastern Alabama, United States, close to the city of Bridgeport. The monument was established on May 11, 1961, when 310 acres (1.3 km^{2}) of land were donated by the National Geographic Society to the American people. It is now administered and maintained by the National Park Service. The national monument was listed on the National Register of Historic Places on October 15, 1966.

Russell Cave has an exceptionally large main entrance, which was used for thousands of years as a shelter by cultures of prehistoric Indians, from around 6500 BCE, the period of earliest-known human settlement in the southeastern United States, to 1650 CE and the period of European colonization. It is believed to have primarily served as a seasonal winter shelter. The people relied on the surrounding forest to gather produce and hunt for game and fish, stone and game for tools, and wood fuel for fires.

With a mapped length of 7.2 miles (11.6 km), Russell Cave is the third-longest mapped cave in Alabama. It is ranked 90th on the United States Long Cave List, and is listed as number 314 on the World Long Cave List. Caving is no longer allowed inside the cave. The grounds offer trails for walking, and the area is a station on the North Alabama Birding Trail.

== Geology ==
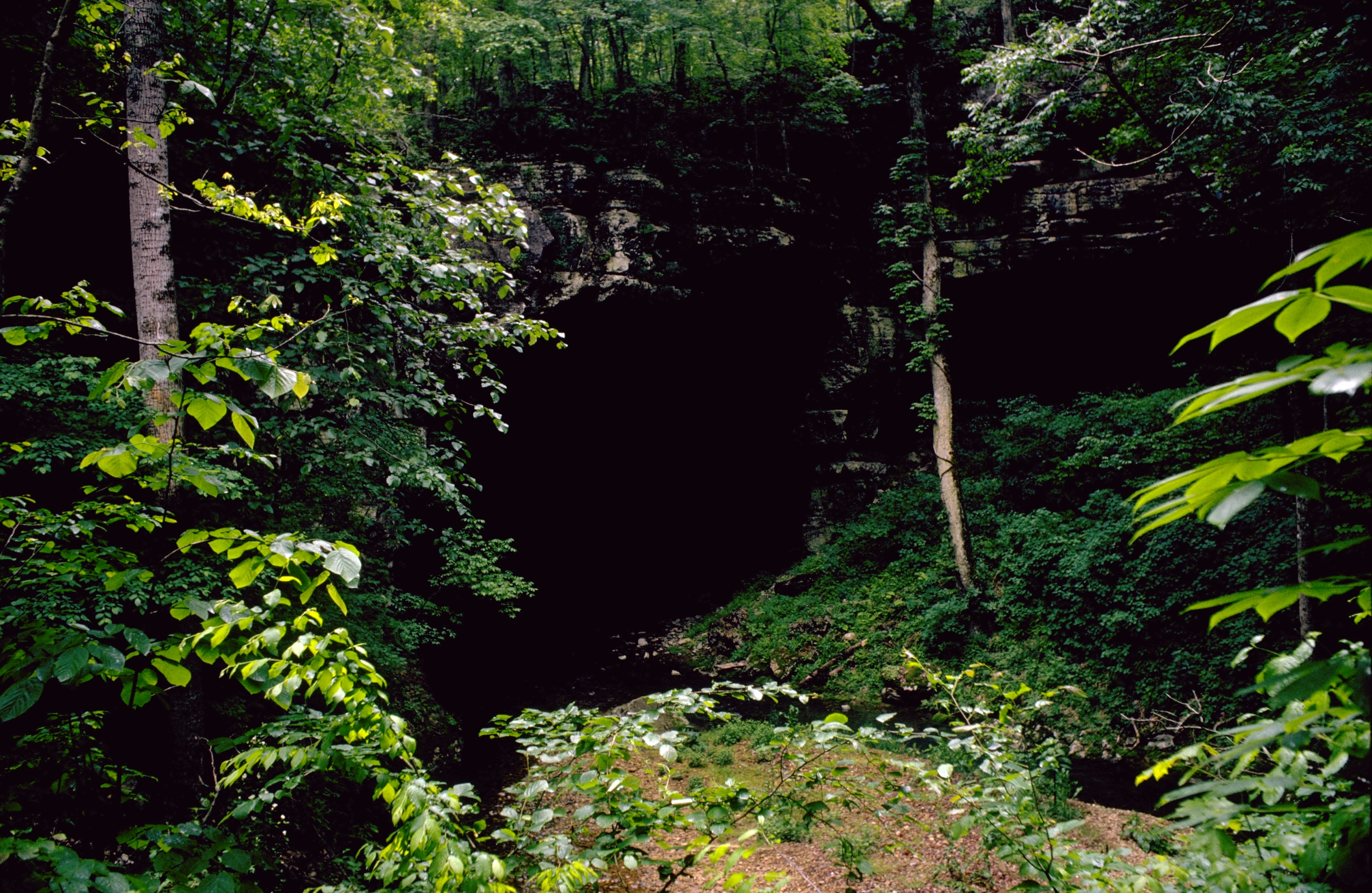
One of several entrances to Russell Cave

The rock from which Russell Cave was carved was formed over 300 million years ago at the bottom of an inland sea covering the region. Due to continental drift, the area that is now northeast Alabama was located very close to the Equator at the time this limestone was forming. This area is now located in a temperate climate, but 300 million years ago, it was a shallow, tropical sea. Carbonaceous deposits of skeletons and shells were slowly transformed into limestone. Rainwater, mildly acidic from atmospheric carbon dioxide, slowly dissolved a portion of the limestone rock, resulting in the formation of the cave. About 9,000 to 12,000 years ago, the collapse of a cavern roof beneath a hillside near Doran's Cove created a sinkhole and exposed Russell Cave.

Until shortly before the first occupation by Native Americans, the cavern was uninhabitable due to the large stream that occupied the entirety of the cavern. A rockfall from the cavern roof diverted the stream to one side, however, exposing a portion of the cave floor. The first occupants lived on this irregular floor of rock slabs. Debris from occupants and deposits falling from the ceiling slowly raised the floor. The floor ultimately was raised an additional 7–8 ft (2.0 to 2.5 m) and up to 30 ft (9.0 m) near the upper entrance. In the 1960s, after the cave had been excavated, the United States Bureau of Mines installed 15-ft-long (4.5 m) bolts as supports to prevent additional collapses of limestone rock.

The cave mouth faces to the east, preventing the ingress of cold north and northwest winds and allowing in the morning sun. According to a published cave map, the cave has five entrances in addition to the main entrance. Three of the entrances are referred to as canoe entrances, while the other two are named the picnic and pig entrances.

A natural spring flows into the cave and travels underground for 1.5 mi (2.5 km) before joining Widow's Creek, and ultimately the Tennessee River.

== History ==
=== Archaic period (before 1000 BCE) ===
Pieces of the history of thousands of years of prehistoric humans have been revealed at this archeological site. Chipped flint points and charcoal from campfires provide evidence that occupation of Russell Cave began nearly 10,000 years ago by Native Americans in the southeastern Archaic period. The charcoal remains of the first fires in the cavern date to between 6550 and 6145 BCE, based on radiocarbon dating. As the people were hunter-gatherers, they likely occupied the cave only during the autumn and winter seasons, when they needed more shelter. According to John Griffin, the issue of seasonality (during what season or seasons the cave was used) remains to be determined. Evidence indicating occupation in autumn and winter include deer bones and passenger pigeon remains. The presence of shellfish artifacts clouds the determination somewhat, as shellfish would have been easier to procure during periods of dry weather in midspring and late summer. However, William J. Clench has suggested that the occupants may have brought mussels and snails to store in nearby bodies of water (Dry Creek and/or Crownover Springs) for use as needed including in autumn or winter. Based on the existing information, Griffin is "strongly inclined" to view Russell Cave as a place of winter occupancy.

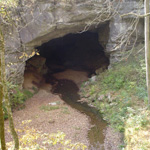
Stream from natural spring entering Russell Cave

In addition to serving as a shelter (presumably for several related families totaling 15 to 30 individuals), the cave would have provided a constant source of water as temperatures in the protected area remained above freezing. The cave's occupancy was limited by individuals' need for mobility and by how much the land could support the people. The surrounding hardwood forest and nearby Tennessee River served as sources of food throughout the year. The food sources would have included aquatic animals (fish, turtles, shellfish), birds (including wild turkey), and small mammals (squirrels, raccoons, rabbits, gray foxes, skunks, bobcats, porcupines, and peccaries) taken in hunting. The women would gather and process a variety of nuts (including acorns), seeds, and roots. Larger animals such as deer and black bears were also commonly hunted by the men when the seasons permitted. Griffin has stated that the dominant animal food sources for these occupants were deer and turkey.

As gatherers, these occupants also would have consumed fruits and berries, although these plant foods may have been scarce or unavailable during the seasons of cave occupancy. Generally speaking, hunter-gathers relied more heavily on plant foods than they did animals. Indirect evidence of gathering includes pits for storage of nuts and seeds, mortars and pestles for breaking up shells and grinding nuts, and nut stones.

Goosefoot, Chenopodium berlandieri, commonly known as goosefoot or lambsquarter, is a small flowering plant whose edible seeds and leaves were cultivated in small garden plots near Russell Cave and throughout the Southeast beginning at least 2,000 years ago. It is one of at least seven species — including sunflower, marsh elder, maygrass, knotweed, little barley, and squash — that form what archaeologists call the Eastern Agricultural Complex (EAC). These plants were domesticated in prehistoric Alabama and neighboring regions thousands of years before the introduction of corn. Evidence of this early plant domestication at Russell Cave comes from carbonized Chenopodium seeds recovered by Carl Miller during his 1950s excavations. Later analysis by Smithsonian archaeobotanist Bruce Smith confirmed that these seeds display the diagnostic traits of domestication, including larger seed size and significantly thinner seed coats. In Rivers of Change, Smith further demonstrates that these characteristics distinguish the domesticated form from its wild relatives, clearly indicating that Indigenous farmers of the Southeast intentionally cultivated and managed this species long before the arrival of maize agriculture.

These early cave dwellers were efficient consumers of game. The women roasted or stewed the flesh. They cured and softened the hides or skins, and made pieces into clothing. Bones were shaped into tools.

Examples of fishing hooks fashioned from bone

The chief weapon of these occupants was a short spear (tipped with a stone point), which was propelled by an atlatl (throwing stick). The points were chipped from chert, which occurs as nodules and veins in limestone near the cave.

Chert was also used to fashion knives and scrapers. The people made awls and needles from the bones. They were used in the production of clothing from hides or manufacturing of baskets. Small pieces of bone were also used to make fish hooks. No ornamental works have been found in this layer of deposits.

Other items, such as baskets and articles fashioned from wood, and hides, were probably produced, but have not been preserved by the soil.

=== Woodland period (1000 BCE to 500 CE) ===
Around 1000 BCE, the implements of the Native Americans occupying Russell Cave underwent a dramatic change. Pottery appears for the first time. Smaller weapon points indicate that the bow and arrow had replaced the atlatl and spear. Tools fashioned from bone were more refined. Other domestic implements provide the first evidence of gardening at the site. Additionally, bone and shell appear in ornamental artifacts. Evident throughout the Woodland period is an increase in the amount of hunting at the expense of other activities. During this period, the cave clearly had become simply a hunting camp. In the seasons away from the cave, the natives probably joined other groups at summer villages larger than those of the Archaic period.

These changes occurred in groups throughout the Eastern United States and marked the beginning of the Woodland period. During this period, the people built earthwork burial mounds, the population increased, and trade became important.

Changes in the shape and style of artifacts at Russell Cave during the Woodland period serve as a basis for identifying cultural subdivisions within the period. For example, early pottery of the period is decorated with fabric impressions, while later pottery is decorated with impressions made by carved wooden paddles.

=== Mississippian period (after 500 CE) ===
After the close of the Woodland period (around 500 CE), Native Americans made less and less use of Russell Cave. Occasionally, small parties of hunters left objects distinct from those of the Woodland-period occupants. These visitors (known as mound builders of the Mississippian culture) came from permanent villages. These had successfully developed agriculture on the rich river bottomlands of the Ohio and Mississippi Rivers and their tributaries. They build large complexes of earthwork mounds to express their religious and political concepts. The last occupants of the cave departed around 1000 CE.

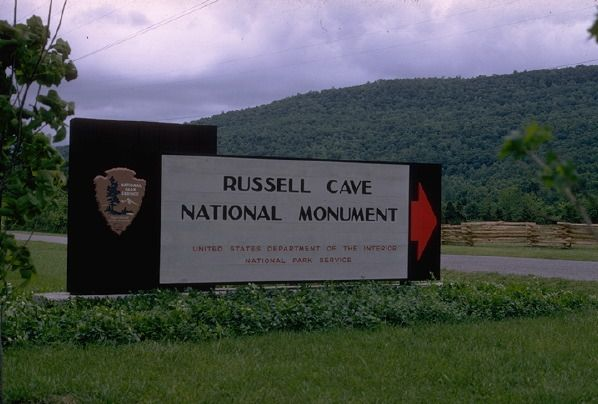
Entrance to Russell Cave National Monument with old entrance sign

=== Historic period ===
Centuries later, Cherokee Indians occupied this part of the Tennessee Valley. They and the subsequent European settlers made little use of the cave. Due to the establishment of permanent settlements, locations such as Russell Cave were used only sporadically by Native Americans, usually as stopovers for hunting and trading parties. Few objects that they left were found very close to the surface. The only modern historical artifact found at the site was a metal fish hook.

The expedition of Spanish explorer Hernando de Soto passed within 100 mi (160 km) of Russell Cave in 1540.

=== Recent history ===
Russell Cave was named after Colonel Thomas Russell, a veteran of the American Revolutionary War from North Carolina, who owned the property at the time when maps of the area were drawn. The surrounding land, called Doran's Cove, is named after Major James Doran, Russell's brother-in-law and the original owner of the land. Following excavation and reporting in 1956, the land was purchased by the National Geographic Society and donated to the American people. The area was designated as a national monument in 1961 during the presidency of John F. Kennedy.

== Archeological surveys ==
Russell Cave provides the most thorough artifact records of any prehistoric culture in the southeast. Archeological field surveys have uncovered evidence of the cave's occupants. Around two tons of artifacts have been recovered from the site. These discoveries include charcoal from fires, bones of animals (as remains of hunted game and as bone tools), spear and arrow points, sherds of pottery, and the remains of several adults and children buried at the site. The bodies, ranging in age from infant to 50 years, were buried in shallow pits in the cave floor and were not accompanied by artifacts.

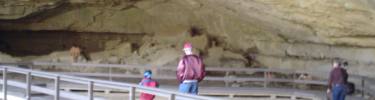
Visitors touring the Russell Cave shelter

Archaic-period Kirk point, Russell Cave

The first relics were discovered in 1953 when four members from the Tennessee Archeological Society and University of Chattanooga began digging in the cave. This first excavation reached a depth of 6 ft (1.8 m).

Upon realizing the extent and importance of the site, they contacted the Smithsonian Institution, which conducted three seasons (1956–1958) of archeological digs in cooperation with the National Geographic Society. They reached a depth of more than 32 ft (9.8 m). An additional excavation was performed in 1962 by the National Park Service to a depth of 10.5 ft (3.2 m). This final excavation completed the archeological record and established an on-site exhibit.

Analysis of the distribution of the artifacts among functional categories (fabricating and processing tools, domestic implements, weapons) using an experimental technique proposed by Howard Winters reveals that the ratio of nonweapon artifacts to weapons was very low. This is indicative of a hunting camp with lack of permanent occupancy. The picture of prehistoric life gained from Russell Cave is necessarily incomplete, due to the incomplete nature of archeological records and because Russell Cave represents only a portion of the annual lifecycle of the inhabitants.

== Biology ==
Studies of historical geology and paleobotany have shown that the flora and fauna of the Eastern Forest Region remained essentially unchanged for thousands of years. This began to change after the arrival of European-American settlers in the early 19th century. They removed trees for timber and to open land for subsistence and commercial farming.

The cave is populated by both the brown bat and northern long-eared bat. The cave stream contains fish known as sculpin. Snakes of the surrounding area include the copperhead, timber rattlesnake, rat snake, and kingsnake. Over 115 species of birds have been identified by researchers at Russell Cave, which is located along the North Alabama Birding Trail. Although the site is now south of the southern boundary of the porcupine range, their bones have been found in digs at the earliest occupational levels. The peccary, also hunted by former occupants, is no longer found in this region.

== Visitation ==
Brazilian foresters touring Russell Cave in 1965

Russell Cave National Monument is located at 3729 County Road 98, Bridgeport, Alabama 35740. The site is open year-round, seven days a week (closed on New Year's Day, Thanksgiving Day, and Christmas Day). Hours of operation are 8:00 am to 4:30 pm Central Time. No fees are charged to enter the park or tour the cave.

A diverse range of attractions is available to visitors of Russell Cave National Monument.

=== Gilbert H. Grosvenor Visitor Center ===
In the center, guests can view museum exhibits, watch documentary films about the lifestyles of prehistoric peoples, or purchase items from the gift shop or bookstore.

The visitor center at Russell Cave National Monument is named after Gilbert Hovey Grosvenor, the editor of National Geographic Magazine from 1903 to 1954, and president of the National Geographic Society from 1920 to 1954. The visitor center was dedicated in 1967.

=== Cave shelter ===
Guided tours of the cave shelter are conducted by National Park Service Interpretative Rangers. The cave shelter includes the areas that were occupied by the prehistoric groups and features a diorama depicting activities of the occupants. The cave shelter is located about 300 yd (310 m) from the visitor center. It is accessed via by an elevated wooden boardwalk.

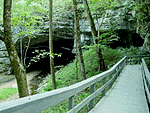
Boardwalk to cave shelter at Russell Cave National Monument

=== Russell Cave ===
Russell Cave is one of the most extensive cave systems in Alabama, with more than 7 mi (11 km) of mapped passageways. Due to the discovery of several rare species (including a species of scorpion that exists nowhere else in the world), recreational caving is no longer allowed.

=== Walking trails ===
Russell Cave National Monument offers visitors two trails: the Nature Trail, a 0.6-mile (.95 km) paved trail, and the Backcountry Trail, a 1.2-mile (1.9-km) dirt trail. Both trails provide good opportunities to observe the forest, wildflowers, and Montague Mountain. Points along the trails feature plants that were used by Native Americans for food, tools, and other daily necessities.

=== Native American Festival ===
Each year during the first weekend in May, the Russell Cave National Monument hosts a Native American Festival, which includes performances of storytelling, dancing, and Native American flute playing. A historical reenactment of a Cherokee encampment is conducted. At this event and at other times throughout the year, demonstrations of Native American lifestyles and weaponry are conducted. Weapons demonstrations include flintknapping to produce points (arrowheads), use of the atlatl for spear throwing, and use of a bow and arrow. Other demonstrations feature wood carving, handbuilding of pottery, and fire building.

=== North Alabama Birding Trail ===
Logo of the North Alabama Birding Trail

Russell Cave National Monument is Site 44 on the Northeastern Loop of the North Alabama Birding Trail. The North Alabama Birding Trail is not a "trail" in the traditional sense of the word, but a series of mostly roadside stops throughout North Alabama that have been selected for their birdwatching characteristics.

Although many types of birds are present, this site is known for its tanagers (summer tanager and scarlet tanager) and the yellow-billed cuckoo. During migration, almost any species of eastern warbler and vireo can be spotted in the park. The prime seasons for watching the songbirds are spring, summer, and autumn.

== See also ==
- List of national monuments of the United States
