= Lauderdale Wildlife Management Area =

Protected area in Alabama, United States

- IUCN category V (protected landscape/seascape)
- Location within Alabama Location within the United States
- Location: Lauderdale County, Alabama, United States
- Nearest city: Waterloo, Alabama, United States
- Coordinates: 34°59′54″N 88°08′07″W
- Area: 18,194 acres (73.63 km^{2})
- Governing body: Alabama Department of Conservation and Natural Resources

The Lauderdale Wildlife Management Area is an Alabama Wildlife Management Area (WMA) operated by the Alabama Department of Conservation and Natural Resources in Lauderdale County, Alabama near Waterloo, Alabama.
