= Pickwick Landing Dam =

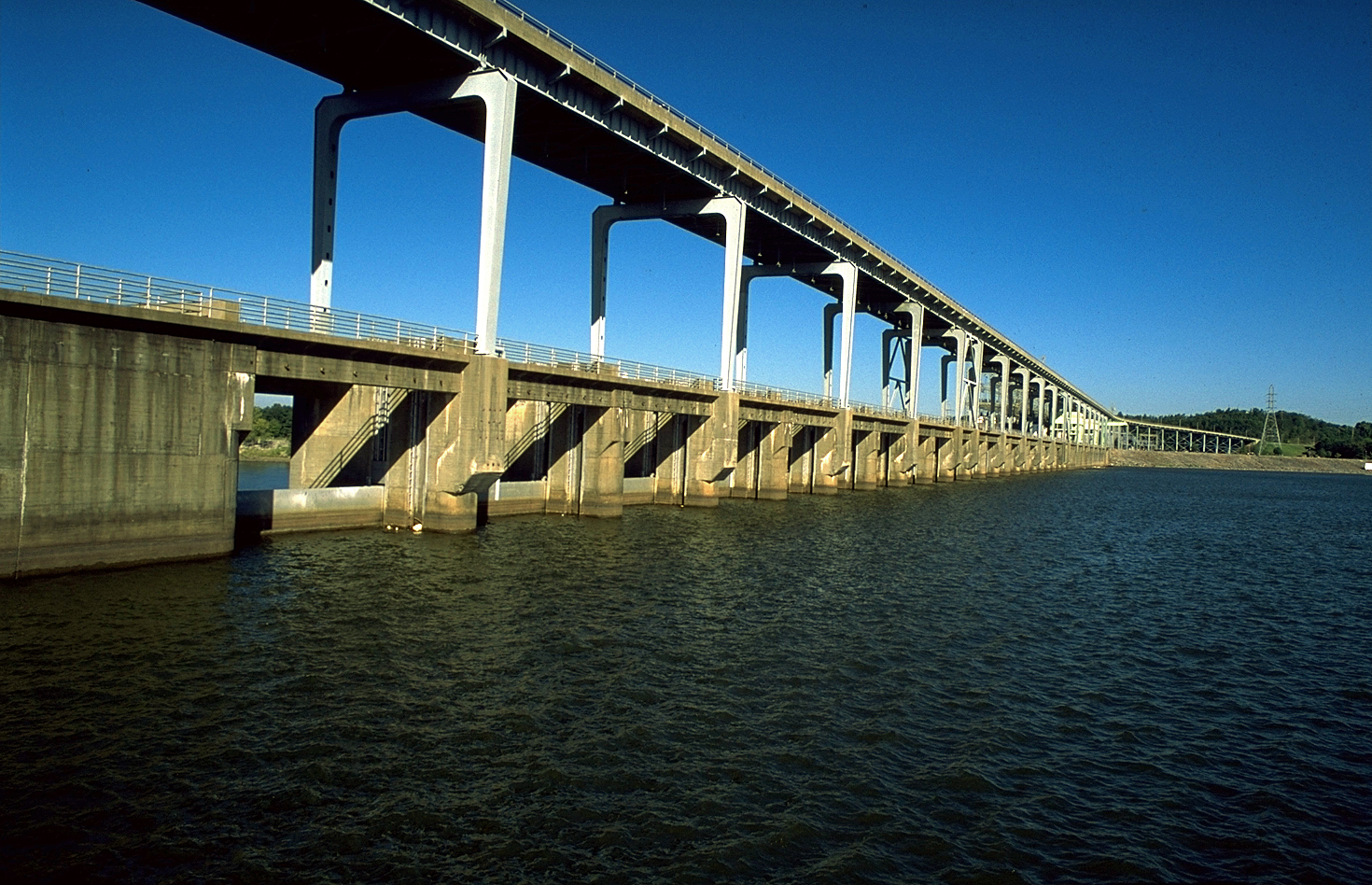
- Pickwick Landing Dam from upstream
- Official name: Pickwick Landing Dam
- Location: Pickwick Dam, Hardin County, Tennessee, U.S.
- Coordinates: 35°03′50″N 88°14′50″W
- Construction began: March 1935
- Opening date: May 8, 1938
- Operator: Tennessee Valley Authority

Dam and spillways
- Impounds: Tennessee River
- Height: 113 ft (34 m)
- Length: 7,715 ft (2,352 m)

Reservoir
- Creates: Pickwick Lake

Pickwick Landing Dam is a hydroelectric dam on the Tennessee River in Hardin County, in the U.S. state of Tennessee. The dam is one of nine dams on the river owned and operated by the Tennessee Valley Authority, which built the dam in the 1930s as part of a New Deal-era initiative to create a continuous navigation channel between the river's mouth and Knoxville, and bring economic development to the area. The dam impounds the 43,100-acre (17,400 ha) Pickwick Lake and its tailwaters are part of Kentucky Lake.

Pickwick Landing Dam is named for a community situated near the dam site at the time of construction. The community had been named after the title character in the Charles Dickens novel, The Pickwick Papers.

== Location ==
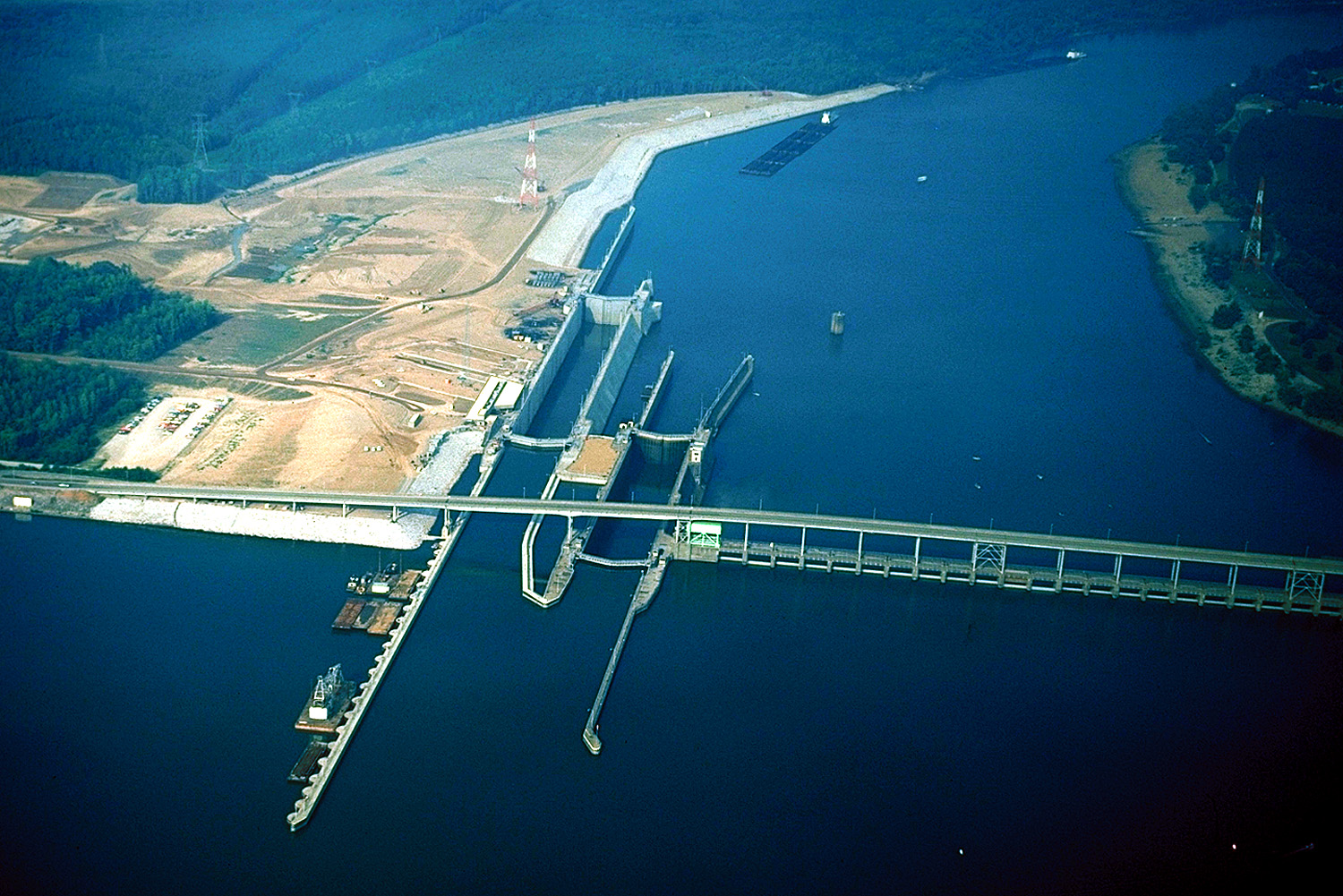
Aerial view of Pickwick Landing's lock

Pickwick Landing Dam is located nearly 207 miles (333 km) above the mouth of the Tennessee River, a few miles north of the point where the states of Tennessee, Alabama, and Mississippi meet. This stretch of the river is also a geological boundary between the scattered hills of the Western Highland Rim to the northeast and the flatlands of West Tennessee to the northwest.

Most of the land just south of the dam and its immediate lakeshore is part of Pickwick Landing State Park, and Shiloh National Military Park is located a few miles to the north. Pickwick Lake stretches nearly 53 miles (85 km) to the base of Wilson Dam at Muscle Shoals, Alabama, and includes parts of Hardin County in Tennessee, Lauderdale and Colbert counties in Alabama, and Tishomingo County in Mississippi. The area around Pickwick Landing Dam is sparsely populated. The nearest community of note being Counce, Tennessee two (2) miles to the southwest with a population of 316 as of 2020. Tennessee State Route 128 crosses the top of the dam, connecting the area to Savannah to the north.

== Capacity ==
Pickwick Landing Dam is 113 feet (34 m) high and 7,715 feet (2,352 m) long, and has a generating capacity of 240,200 kilowatts. The dam's spillway has 22 bays with a combined discharge of 650,000 cubic feet per second (18,000 m^{3}/s). Pickwick Lake has 496 miles (798 km) of shoreline and 43,100 acres (17,400 ha) of water surface, and has a flood-storage capacity of 417,700 acre-feet (515,200,000 m^{3}). Pickwick Landing Dam is serviced by two locks— one measuring 110 by 1,000 feet (34 by 305 m) and the other measuring 110 by 600 feet (34 by 183 m). The locks' lift raises and lowers vessels up to 63 feet (19 m) between Pickwick and Kentucky lakes.

== Background and construction ==
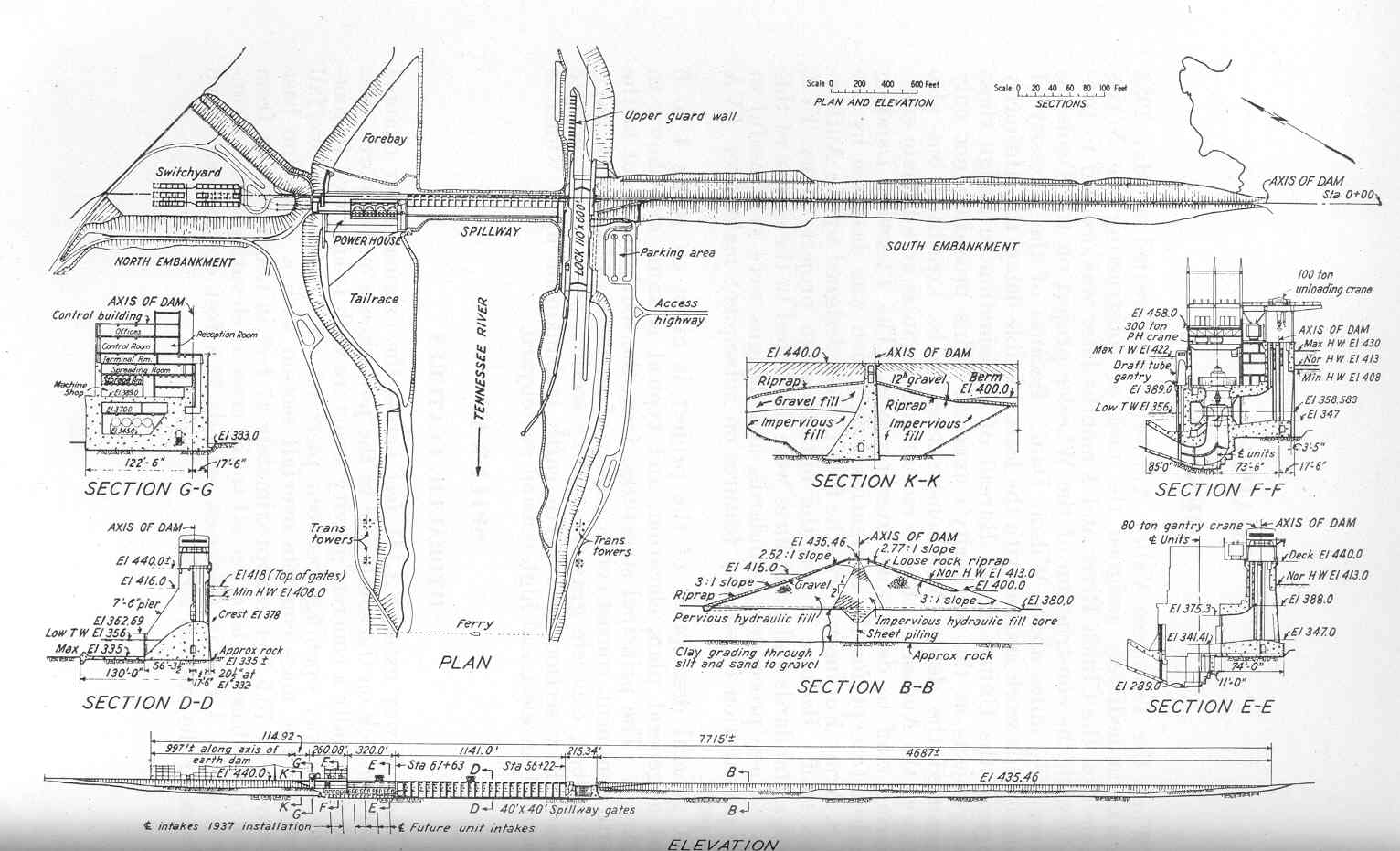
The original design plan for Pickwick Landing Dam, circa 1935

Throughout the 19th century, a series of river rapids known as the Muscle Shoals (in northern Alabama) were a major impediment to navigation along the Tennessee River and effectively isolated the upper stretches of the river (namely Knoxville and Chattanooga) from the nation's major inland waterways. The construction of Wilson Dam by the U.S. Army Corps of Engineers in the 1920s and the construction of Wheeler Dam by the Tennessee Valley Authority in the 1930s flooded a large section of the shoals, but serious obstacles still remained between Riverton and Florence, especially in the vicinity of Tuscumbia.

As Wheeler Dam neared completion in 1935, TVA knew a third dam would be necessary to connect the reservoirs at Muscle Shoals with the lower part of the river. Several private entities had investigated the possibility of building a dam at Parker's Landing (a few miles upstream from Pickwick), but the Corps of Engineers— which had surveyed the area in the 1920s— suggested TVA build a dam at Pickwick Landing. The Pickwick Landing project was authorized on November 19, 1934, and work began in March 1935.

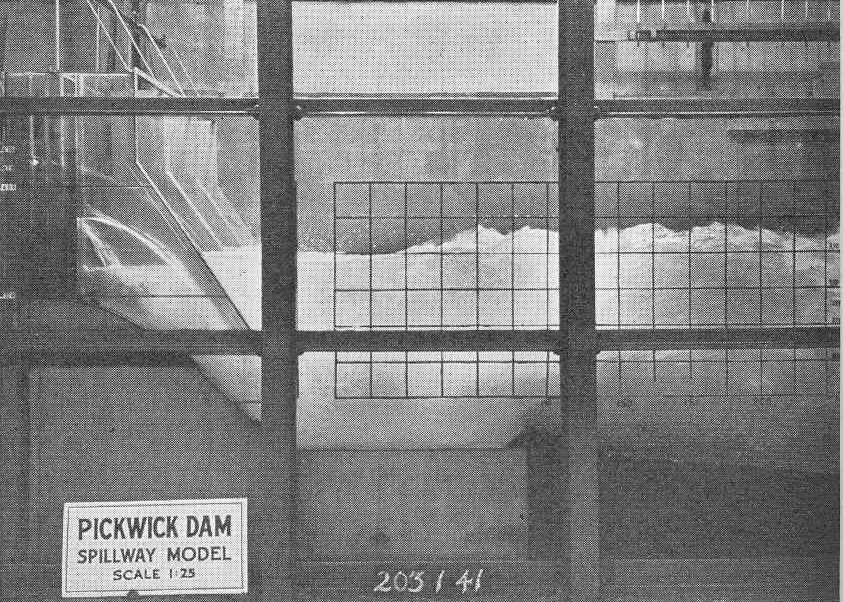
Laboratory testing for Pickwick's spillway, circa 1935-1938

The construction of Pickwick Landing Dam and its accompanying reservoir required the purchase of 63,700 acres (25,800 ha) of land, 12,590 acres (5,090 ha) of which had to be cleared. 506 families, 407 graves, and 70 miles (110 km) of roads had to be relocated. Parts of Riverton and Waterloo, Alabama were flooded. The residents of the latter demanded TVA purchase the whole town, claiming the reservoir would destroy property values, but TVA declined, citing a study that suggested the reservoir would not have a serious or detrimental impact on the town's economy. Pickwick Landing Dam's original turbines were among the largest propeller-type turbines in the world at the time in which they were installed.

Pickwick Landing Dam was completed and the gates closed on February 8, 1938, although dredge work continued until 1941. The first generator went online in August 1938. The lock was designed by the Corps of Engineers, and its 63-foot (19 m) lift was among the highest in the world when the lock became operational on February 19, 1938. Pickwick Landing Dam was constructed at a cost of just over $45 million.

== See also ==
- Dams and reservoirs of the Tennessee River
- List of crossings of the Tennessee River
