= Pickwick Dam, Tennessee =

- Unincorporated community
- Location within Tennessee Location within the United States
- Coordinates: 35°03′08″N 88°14′30″W
- Country: United States
- State: Tennessee
- County: Hardin
- Elevation: 453 ft (138 m)
- Time zone: UTC-6 (Central (CST))
  - Summer (DST): UTC-5 (CDT)
- ZIP code: 38365
- Area code: 731
- GNIS feature ID: 1297405

Pickwick Dam (also known as Pickwick Village) is an unincorporated community in Hardin County, Tennessee, United States. Pickwick Dam is located on the Tennessee River south of the Pickwick Landing Dam. Pickwick Dam has a post office with ZIP code 38365.

Pickwick Landing State Park is located in Pickwick Dam.
