= Hays Nature Preserve =

Nature preserve in Huntsville, Alabama

- J.D. and Annie S. Hays Nature Preserve
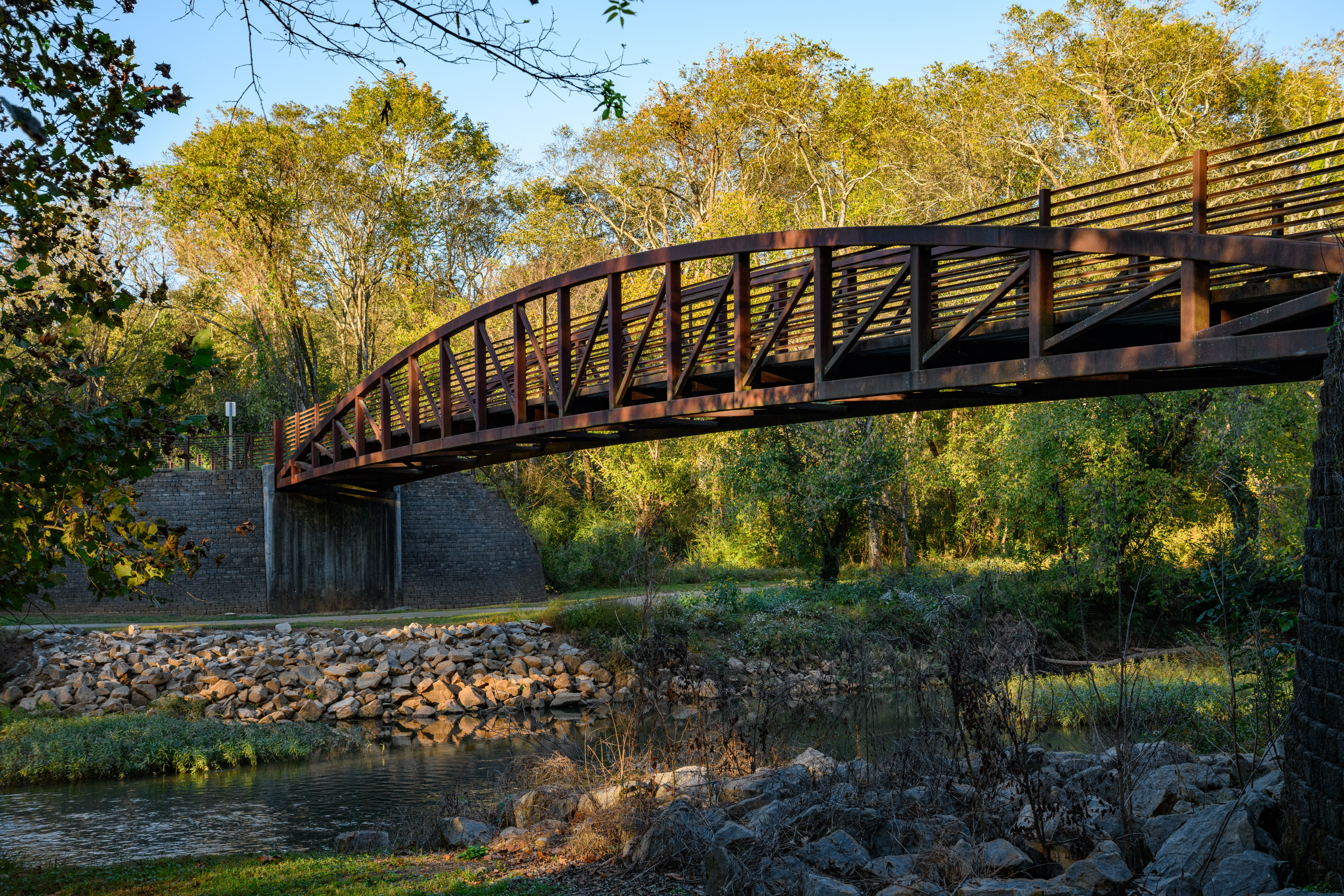
- A bridge across the Flint River in the Hays Nature Preserve.

- Location within Alabama Location within the United States
- Type: Nature preserve
- Location: Huntsville, Alabama
- Coordinates: 34°38′44″N 86°28′02″W
- Area: 538 acres (218 ha)
- Established: 1999

The J.D. and Annie S. Hays Nature Preserve is a 538-acre (218 ha) nature preserve near Hampton Cove in Huntsville, Alabama. Together with the adjacent Goldsmith Schiffman Wildlife Sanctuary, the preserves form the city's largest undeveloped parkland. The preserve has over 10 miles of trails for hiking, biking, and horseback riding.

== History ==
In 1999, Annie Hays and the Hays family donated 538 acres of land to the city of Huntsville, Alabama for the creation of a nature preserve. In exchange for the donation, the city named the preserve after J.D. and Annie S. Hays and pledged to provide at least $50,000 for annual maintenance.

In 2024, a ADA compliant fishing pier was constructed on Bar Lake within the preserve. Construction of the pier was funded by an $85,000 donation by the James Gordon Williams Legacy Fund. Williams, whom the pier was named after, was a former employee of the Hays family.

== Conservation ==
Unlike many of the other preserves in the Huntsville area, the Hays Nature Preserve protects lowland habitats, including river front and swampland.

Every year, the Huntsville Green Team hosts an Earth Day celebration at the preserve to educate the public about sustainability.

=== Flora and fauna ===
More than 120 different species of plants can be found in the preserve.

Animal species that live in the preserve include armadillos, red-tailed hawks, deer, and coyotes.

The preserve is a part of the North Alabama Birding Trail.
