= The Pickwick Papers (disambiguation) =

The Pickwick Papers is the first novel by Charles Dickens.

The Pickwick Papers may also refer to:

- The Pickwick Papers (1913 film), a silent film adaptation by Vitagraph Studios
- The Pickwick Papers (1952 film), a British black-and-white film adaptation
- The Pickwick Papers (1985 film), an Australian animated film adaptation
- The Pickwick Papers (TV series), a television adaptation first broadcast in 1985 by the BBC
