= Sauta Cave National Wildlife Refuge =

Wildlife refuge in Alabama

- IUCN category IV (habitat/species management area)
- Location within the United States
- Location: Jackson County, Alabama, United States
- Nearest city: Scottsboro, Alabama
- Coordinates: 34°36′52″N 86°07′43″W
- Area: 264 acres (107 ha)
- Established: 1978
- Visitors: 5,000 (in 2005)
- Governing body: U.S. Fish and Wildlife Service
- Website: Sauta Cave NWR

Sauta Cave National Wildlife Refuge is a 264-acre (107 ha) National Wildlife Refuge located in northeastern Alabama, near the Sauty Creek embayment of Guntersville Lake.

More than 5,000 visitors per year visit the refuge. The facility is unstaffed, but is administered by the Wheeler National Wildlife Refuge in Decatur, Alabama. The cave itself is closed to the public.

== History ==
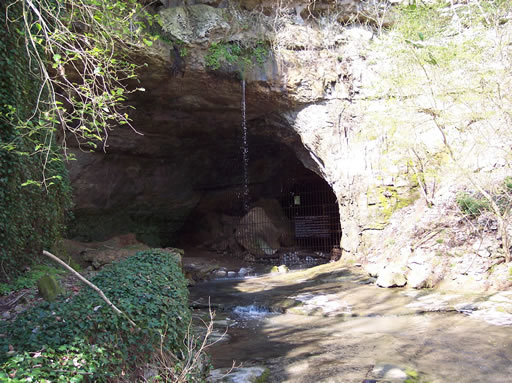
Entrance to Sauta Cave

The name Sauta comes from the Cherokee word itsati, which has an unknown meaning. In the past, the cave served a variety of uses. Cherokee natives mined the soil to make saltpeter for gunpowder. In 1819, the year Alabama was admitted to the Union, Jackson County, Alabama, became a county with the county seat at Sauta. Court was held in Sauta Cave.

Saltpeter mining continued on occasion across the War of 1812, and the American Civil War. Sauta Cave was one of the largest saltpeter mines operated during the Civil War. Approximately 60 enslaved men were put to work mining the cave during the war for the benefit of the Confederate Ordnance Bureau. Remains of the mining exists in the form of a wooden railroad and large iron kettles; the mining tunnels are now referred to as "The Catacombs".

A building near the entrance to the cave was used as a fishing store and night club from 1919 to 1956, with a dance area near one of the entrances to take advantage of the cool wind exiting the cave. In 1962, a local National Guard unit prepared the cave for use as a fallout shelter.

In 1978, the United States Fish and Wildlife Service acquired the property to protect the endangered Indiana and gray bats. The site was originally named the Blowing Wind Cave National Wildlife Refuge. Access to the cave was restricted to scientific research on the bats. In 1999, it was renamed to its current name of Sauta Cave National Wildlife Refuge.

== Wildlife ==
The Sauta Cave NWR protects several endangered species of bat include the gray and Indiana bats. In the summer of 1997, more than 200,000 gray bats were counted at the cave. Other than species that live in the cave include the Tennessee cave salamander (Gyrinophilus palleucus), the Rafinesque's big-eared bat (Corynorhinus rafinesquii), and the cave salamander (Eurycea lucifuga). The refuge also contains the federally endangered Price's potato bean.

== Facilities ==
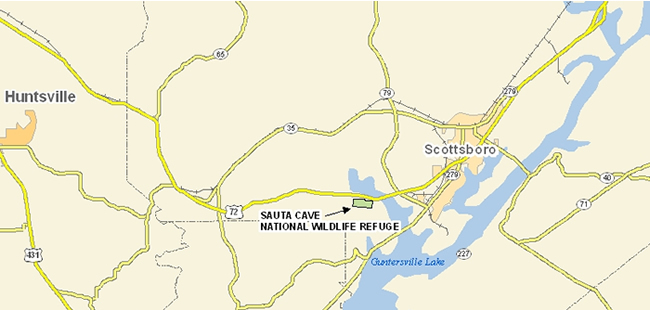
Map of Sauta Cave NWR

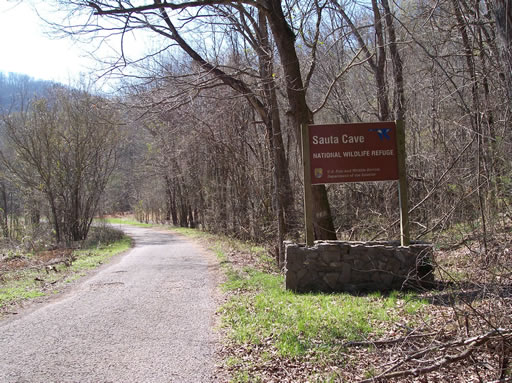
Sauta Cave NWR

There are two entrances to the cave on a hillside in a refuge. Although access to the cave is generally not permitted, limited entry for scientific research is granted. The area offers opportunities for wildlife observation, hiking, and photography.

A top activity is the viewing of the bats emerging from the cave during the summer. For about an hour at dusk, approximately 400,000 bats leave the cave to search for food. A viewing platform has been constructed to facilitate the viewing of the bats.

== See also ==
- List of National Wildlife Refuges
