= Pickwick Lake =

Man-made reservoir in the southeastern United States

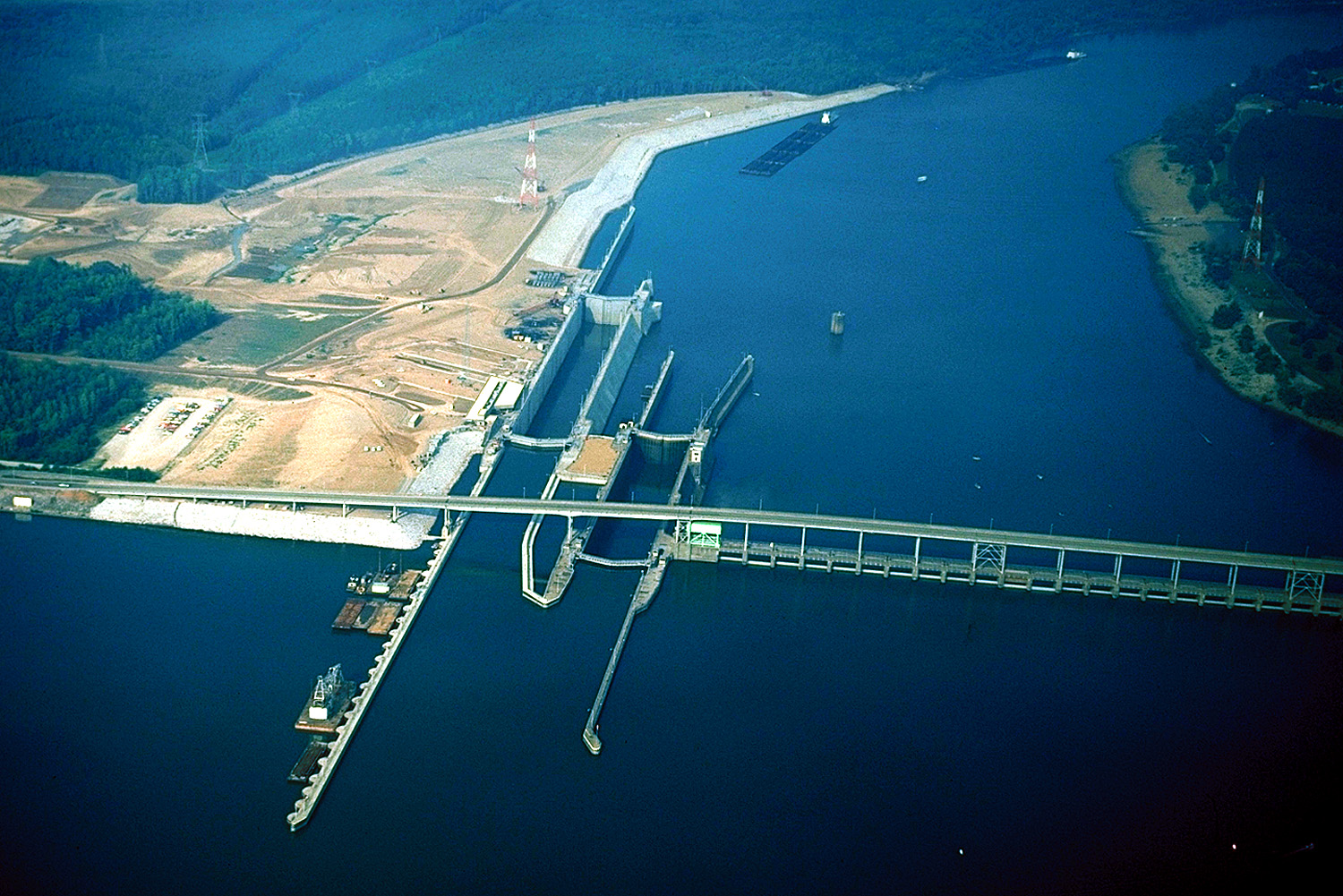
- Pickwick Landing Dam and Lock

- Location within Alabama Location within Mississippi Location within Tennessee Location within the United States
- Location: Alabama / Mississippi / Tennessee
- Coordinates: 35°02′25″N 88°11′36″W
- Type: reservoir
- Primary inflows: Tennessee River
- Primary outflows: Tennessee River, Tennessee-Tombigbee Waterway
- Basin countries: United States
- Surface area: 43,100 acres (174 km^{2})
- Average depth: 30 ft (9 m)
- Max. depth: 59 ft (18 m)
- Surface elevation: 410 ft (125 m)

Pickwick Lake is the reservoir created by Pickwick Landing Dam as part of the Tennessee Valley Authority. The lake stretches from Pickwick Landing Dam in Counce, Tennessee, to Wilson Dam in Florence, Alabama, and is one of the few lakes in the United States to be located in three different states.

Pickwick Lake has excellent sportfishing areas, including the Wilson Dam tailwater at the upper end of the reservoir, noted for record-size smallmouth bass and catfish. Another favorite spot is the discharge basin at Colbert Fossil Plant west of Sheffield, Alabama, where the warm water discharged from the power plant attracts fish during cold weather. The lakeshore plays host to two state parks: Tennessee's Pickwick Landing State Park and Mississippi's J P Coleman State Park.

Pickwick Lake is the north end of the Tennessee-Tombigbee Waterway, which provides a water transportation route to the Gulf of Mexico.

Yellow Creek Cove is home to the Yellow Creek waterfall and is a popular destination for boaters. A rope swing off the top of the waterfall has been present for many years.

== See also ==
- Dams and reservoirs of the Tennessee River
