= Pickwick Landing State Park =

State park in Pickwick Dam, Hardin County, Tennessee, USA

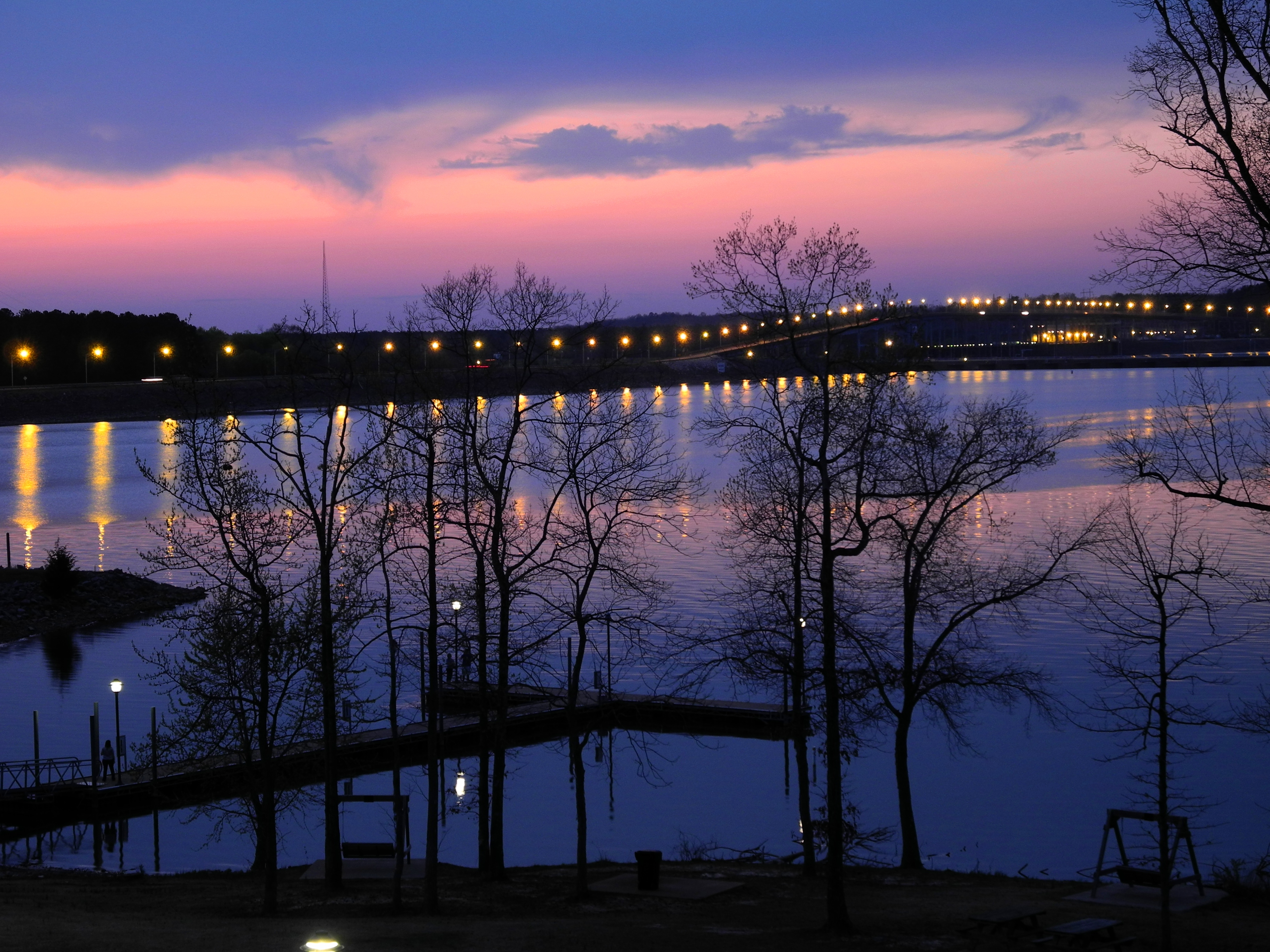
- View of the lake and dam from the park's Pickwick Inn
- Interactive map of Pickwick Landing State Park
- Type: Tennessee State Park
- Location: Pickwick Dam, Tennessee
- Coordinates: 35.052010°N 88.240862°W
- Area: 681 acres (2.76 km^{2})
- Created: 1969
- Operator: Tennessee Department of Environment and Conservation
- Open: year round
- Website: Pickwick Landing State Park

Pickwick Landing State Park is a state park in Pickwick Dam, Hardin County, Tennessee, in the southeastern United States around the Pickwick Lake impoundment of the Tennessee River. It is named for Pickwick Landing, a 19th-century riverboat stop.

== History ==
The park was created in 1969 when the State of Tennessee purchased the town of Pickwick Village from the Tennessee Valley Authority.

== Amenities ==
The park contains a golf course, a 119-room inn, ten cabins, two campgrounds, two picnic pavilions, a restaurant called The Captain's Galley and a marina. The main campground has 48 sites, each equipped with a picnic table, grill and utility hookups. The other, Bruton Branch Campground, has 33 sites.
