= Audubon National Wildlife Refuge Complex =

The Audubon National Wildlife Refuge Complex is located in the U.S. state of North Dakota and consists of numerous National Wildlife Refuges, all of which are managed by the U.S. Fish and Wildlife Service but most of which are on private property, and are known as Easement refuges. Landowners generally agree to abide by regulations imposed by the U.S. Government. The refuges are located in the central sections of North Dakota. The complex is managed from the Audubon National Wildlife Refuge and includes the following National Wildlife Refuges:

- Audubon National Wildlife Refuge
- Audubon Wetland Management District
- Camp Lake National Wildlife Refuge (easement refuge)
- Hiddenwood National Wildlife Refuge (easement refuge)
- Lake Nettie National Wildlife Refuge (easement refuge)
- Lake Otis National Wildlife Refuge (easement refuge)
- Lake Patricia National Wildlife Refuge (easement refuge)
- Lost Lake National Wildlife Refuge (easement refuge)
- McLean National Wildlife Refuge (easement refuge)
- Pretty Rock National Wildlife Refuge (easement refuge)
- Sheyenne Lake National Wildlife Refuge (easement refuge)
- Stewart Lake National Wildlife Refuge (easement refuge)
- White Lake National Wildlife Refuge (easement refuge)
- Lake Ilo National Wildlife Refuge
