= Pick City, North Dakota =

- City
- Location of Pick City, North Dakota
- Coordinates: 47°30′40″N 101°27′26″W
- Country: United States
- State: North Dakota
- County: Mercer
- Founded: July 1946

Government
  - Type: Mayor-council government
  - Mayor: Toby Thomes

Area
  - Total: 0.19 sq mi (0.49 km^{2})
  - Land: 0.19 sq mi (0.49 km^{2})
  - Water: 0 sq mi (0.00 km^{2})
- Elevation: 1,919 ft (585 m)

Population (2020)
  - Total: 123
  - Density: 650/sq mi (250/km^{2})
- Time zone: UTC-7 (Mountain (MST))
  - Summer (DST): UTC-6 (MDT)
- ZIP code: 58545
- Area code: 701
- FIPS code: 38-62260
- GNIS feature ID: 1036220
- Website: pickcitynd.com

Pick City is a city in Mercer County, North Dakota, United States. The population was 123 at the 2020 census. Pick City was founded in 1946 and named after Lewis A. Pick, director of the Missouri River office of the United States Army Corps of Engineers. It overlooks the Garrison Dam.

== History ==
Due to frequent floodings in the area during the previous decades, the Bureau of Reclamation and Army Corps of Engineers both agreed that a solution had to be found. They decided to invest in a dam that aimed to capitalize off of the local water sources to produce hydroelectric power and irrigate land in the nearby basin to ease agriculture. On top of that, they also promoted the creation of a city to oversee said dam, which would be platted as "Pick City" in July 1946 . The city was inhabited by people from all over the U.S. which benefitted from the project.

== Geography ==
According to the United States Census Bureau, the city has a total area of 0.18 square miles (0.47 km^{2}), all land.

== Demographics ==
Historical population
Census	Pop.	Note	%±
1950	294		—
1960	101		−65.6%
1970	119		17.8%
1980	182		52.9%
1990	203		11.5%
2000	166		−18.2%
2010	123		−25.9%
2020	123		0.0%
U.S. Decennial Census; 2020 Census

=== 2010 census ===
As of the census of 2010, there were 123 people, 3 households, and 6 families residing in the city. The population density was 5 inhabitants per square mile (1.9/km^{2}). There were 132 housing units at an average density of 733.3 per square mile (283.1/km^{2}). The racial makeup of the city was 99.2% White and 0.8% Native American. Hispanic or Latino of any race were 0.8% of the population.

There were 63 households, of which 7.9% had children under the age of 18 living with them, 52.4% were married couples living together, 3.2% had a female householder with no husband present, 1.6% had a male householder with no wife present, and 42.9% were non-families. 33.3% of all households were made up of individuals, and 17.4% had someone living alone who was 65 years of age or older. The average household size was 1.95 and the average family size was 2.36.

The median age in the city was 58.3 years. 10.6% of residents were under the age of 18; 3.9% were between the ages of 18 and 24; 10.5% were from 25 to 44; 37.4% were from 45 to 64; and 37.4% were 65 years of age or older. The gender makeup of the city was 51.2% male and 48.8% female.

=== 2000 census ===
As of the census of 2000, there were 166 people, 72 households, and 51 families residing in the town. The population density was 951.5 inhabitants per square mile (367.4/km^{2}). There were 117 housing units at an average density of 670.6 per square mile (258.9/km^{2}). The racial makeup of the city was 87.35% White, 3.61% Native American, and 9.04% from two or more races.

There were 72 households, out of which 25.0% had children under the age of 18 living with them, 62.5% were married couples living together, 4.2% had a female householder with no husband present, and 27.8% were non-families. 26.4% of all households were made up of individuals, and 11.1% had someone living alone who was 65 years of age or older. The average household size was 2.31 and the average family size was 2.75.

In the city, the population was spread out, with 22.3% under the age of 18, 6.0% from 18 to 24, 24.7% from 25 to 44, 30.7% from 45 to 64, and 16.3% who were 65 years of age or older. The median age was 42 years. For every 100 females, there were 100.0 males. For every 100 females age 18 and over, there were 101.6 males.

The median income for a household in the city was $36,563, and the median income for a family was $37,750. Males had a median income of $36,250 versus $18,750 for females. The per capita income for the city was $16,077. About 8.8% of families and 9.0% of the population were below the poverty line, including 13.9% of those under the age of eighteen and 7.1% of those 65 or over.

== Education ==
It is in Underwood School District 8.

At one time the Pick City Sitka School provided educational services. That school merged into the Riverdale School District 89 school, for Riverdale. In 1992, elementary school students went to school in Riverdale. Middle and high school students in the Pick City area north of Highway 1806 were assigned to Underwood schools. Students south of Highway 1806 had Underwood, Hazen, and Stanton as choices. There was a movement to have Pick City join the Hazen school district. The Riverdale elementary school closed in 1994.
