= Audubon Wetland Management District =

- IUCN category IV (habitat/species management area)
- Location within the United States
- Location: North Dakota, USA
- Nearest city: Coleharbor, ND
- Coordinates: 47°35′26″N 101°10′23″W
- Governing body: U.S. Fish and Wildlife Service
- Website: Audubon Wetland Management District

Audubon Wetland Management District is located in the U.S. state of North Dakota and consists of 123 Waterfowl Production Areas (WPAs), 8 National Wildlife Refuges (NWRs), and numerous wetland and grassland easements and over 100 separate wetland areas set aside to preserve habitat for bird, plant and mammal species. These lands contain valuable wetland and grassland habitat for waterfowl and other migratory birds, and many other species of wildlife. Scattered throughout west central and southwestern North Dakota in McLean, Ward, and Sheridan Counties, the district is managed by the U.S. Fish and Wildlife Service and from Audubon National Wildlife Refuge. Hundreds of lakes and marshlands in this region provide critical habitat for migratory and nesting bird species.
