= North Dakota Highway 53 =

State highway in North Dakota, U.S.

North Dakota Highway 53

Route information
- Maintained by NDDOT
- Length: 45.037 mi (72.480 km)
- Existed: 1935–present

Major junctions
- West end: US 83 in Max
- East end: US 52 southeast of Balfour

Location
- Country: United States
- State: North Dakota
- Counties: McLean, Sheridan, McHenry

Highway system
- North Dakota State Highway System; Interstate; US; State
← US 52	→ ND 54

North Dakota Highway 53 (ND 53) is a 45.037-mile-long (72.480 km) east–west state highway in the U.S. state of North Dakota. ND 53's western terminus is at U.S. Route 83 (US 83) in Max, and the eastern terminus is at US 52 southeast of Balfour.

== History ==
ND 53 was created when ND 23 was realigned onto a new route to the south.

== Major intersections ==
County	Location	mi	km	Destinations	Notes
McLean	Max	0.000	0.000	US 83 – Minot, Bismarck	Western terminus
McLean		16.851	27.119	ND 41 south – Turtle Lake	Western end of ND 41 concurrency
McLean	Ruso	17.854	28.733	ND 41 north – Velva	Eastern end of ND 41 concurrency
Sheridan	No major junctions				
McHenry		45.037	72.480	US 52 – Harvey, Minot	Eastern terminus
1.000 mi = 1.609 km; 1.000 km = 0.621 mi: Concurrency terminus
