= Wolf family murders =

1920 mass murder in the United States

- Location: near Turtle Lake, North Dakota, United States
- Date: April 22, 1920; 106 years ago
- Target: Wolf family
- Attack type: Mass shooting, mass murder
- Weapons: Hatchet; Double-barreled shotgun
- Deaths: 8
- Perpetrator: Heinrich C. “Henry” Layer

The Wolf family murders occurred on April 22, 1920. Spouses Beata and Jacob Wolf, along with five of their six young daughters, and a teenaged farmhand were found murdered in their family farm outside of Turtle Lake, North Dakota.

As of 2026, it is the worst case of mass murder in the state of North Dakota.

On the day of April 24, 1920, a farmer named John Kraft went to the Wolf residence to retrieve a tool the patriarch of the family, Jacob Wolf, had borrowed only to discover the bodies of the Wolf family and the teenage farmhand brutally murdered. The sole survivor was Emma Wolf, the baby of the family. The neighbor, Henry Layer, confessed to the murders, after it was revealed that he and Jacob had had trouble in the past. Regarding sparing Emma, he said he would have killed her if he had known she was in the other room. It is speculated that Layer did not act alone and someone helped him with the murders.

== Victims ==
Murdered:

- Jacob Wolf, 41
- Beata Wolf, 35
- Bertha Wolf, 12
- Maria Wolf, 9
- Edna Wolf, 7
- Liddia Wolf, 5
- Martha Wolf, 3
- Jacob Hofer, 13

Survivor:

- Emma Wolf, 8 months

== Perpetrator ==
Henry Layer was a German-Russian immigrant who was born in Eigenfeld, a German settlement that was located in Akkermansky Uyezd, Bessarabia Governorate, Russian Empire. In 1886, he moved to the United States with his parents. The Layer family settled near Ashley, North Dakota, where he lived until 1916.

As an adult, Henry married twice. His first marriage was to Mathilda Miller in 1904, together with whom he had two children; they divorced in March 1911. In 1912, he married Lydia Brokofsky Hinzman, together with whom he had six children. He and his second wife moved to Turtle Lake in 1916 and began farming.

Layer was convicted and sentenced to life in prison. He died in prison in 1925 after an operation for appendicitis.

== See also ==
- Charles Bannon, a man who was lynched in Schafer, North Dakota after murdering a family of six, also at a family farm.
