= Lake Otis National Wildlife Refuge =

- IUCN category IV (habitat/species management area)
- Location within the United States
- Location: McLean County, North Dakota, USA
- Nearest city: Ruso, ND
- Coordinates: 47°48′46″N 100°54′30″W
- Area: 320 acres (130 ha)
- Governing body: U.S. Fish and Wildlife Service

Lake Otis National Wildlife Refuge is a 320-acre (130 ha) National Wildlife Refuge (NWR) in the U.S. state of North Dakota. The refuge is an Easement refuge that is entirely on privately owned land, but the landowners and U.S. Government work cooperatively to protect the resources. The U.S. Fish and Wildlife Service oversees Lake Otis NWR from offices at Audubon National Wildlife Refuge.

This is a limited-interest national wildlife refuge. The FWS has an easement on private property allowing it to manage wildlife habitat, but the land remains private property. There is no public access except from adjacent public roads. Limited-interest refuges were created in the 1930s and 1940s in response to declining waterfowl populations and the need to get people back to work during the Great Depression. Many landowners sold easements allowing the federal government to regulate water levels and restrict hunting.
