= Lake Nettie National Wildlife Refuge =

Protected area in North Dakota, United States

- IUCN category IV (habitat/species management area)
- Location within the United States
- Location: McLean County, North Dakota, USA
- Nearest city: Turtle Lake, ND
- Coordinates: 47°37′14″N 100°59′56″W
- Area: 3,055 acres (1,236 ha)
- Governing body: U.S. Fish and Wildlife Service

Lake Nettie National Wildlife Refuge is a 3,055-acre (1,236 ha) National Wildlife Refuge (NWR) in the U.S. state of North Dakota. 2,420 acres (980 ha) of the refuge are public while the remaining 635 acres (257 ha) is an easement on privately owned land, but the landowners and U.S. Government work cooperatively to protect the resources. The U.S. Fish and Wildlife Service oversees Lake Nettie NWR from offices at Audubon National Wildlife Refuge.
