= Camp Lake National Wildlife Refuge =

National Wildlife Refuge in North Dakota, U.S.

- IUCN category IV (habitat/species management area)
- Location within the United States
- Location: McLean County, North Dakota, USA
- Nearest city: Ruso, ND
- Coordinates: 47°46′15″N 100°51′03″W
- Area: 585 acres (237 ha)
- Governing body: U.S. Fish and Wildlife Service

Camp Lake National Wildlife Refuge is a 585-acre (237 ha) National Wildlife Refuge (NWR) in the U.S. state of North Dakota. The refuge is an Easement refuge that is entirely on privately owned land, but the landowners and U.S. Government work cooperatively to protect the resources. The U.S. Fish and Wildlife Service oversees Camp Lake NWR from offices at Audubon National Wildlife Refuge.
