= List of people executed in North Dakota =

The following is a list of people executed by the U.S. state of North Dakota from 1885 to 1905.

Capital punishment was abolished in North Dakota in 1973. Only 8 people, all male, were ever executed in North Dakota, all via hanging. All were executed for murder.

Name	Race	Age	Sex	Date of execution	County	Crime	Victim(s)	Governor
George Miller	White	19	M	October 30, 1885	Grand Forks	Murder	Abbie Snell and Herbert Snell, white	Gilbert A. Pierce
Albert Bomberger	White	22	M	January 19, 1894	Burleigh	Murder-Rape-Robbery	Six people, white (Note: Daniel Kreider, 36, Barbara Kreider, 36, and four of their children: Bernice 13, Murby, 11, Mary 9, and David, 7.)	Eli C. D. Shortridge
James W. Cole	Black	38	M	March 24, 1899	Towner	Murder	Sophronia Ford, 14, black	Frederick B. Fancher
Hans Thorpe	White	66	M	September 14, 1900	Burleigh	Murder	Ida Thorpe, white (wife)	Frederick B. Fancher
Ira Jenkins	White	25	M	September 14, 1900	Ward	Murder-Robbery	August Stark, 25/26, white	Frederick B. Fancher
Jacob L. Bassanella	White	25	M	February 20, 1903	McLean	Murder-Robbery	Anton Heilinger, white (Note: Also murdered Anton Anderson in 1901. His brother, Joseph Bassanella, was convicted of Anderson's murder and received a life sentence. However, Jacob escaped from custody prior to his trial. He revealed his identity after his second arrest.)	Frank White
William R. Ross	White		M	December 5, 1903	Bottineau	Murder-Robbery	Thomas Walsh, 61, white (Note: Confessed to his involvement in the murder of Napoleon LeMay in 1900 on the day before his scheduled execution. He implicated Carl Hanson, who was convicted for his role in the murder and received a life sentence. Hanson, who maintained his innocence, was pardoned in 1910.)	Frank White
John Rooney	White	25	M	October 17, 1905	Cass	Murder-Robbery	Harold Cleve Sweet, 20s, white	Elmore Y. Sarles

== See also ==
- Capital punishment in North Dakota
- Capital punishment in the United States
