= Stewart Lake National Wildlife Refuge =

Protected area in North Dakota, United States

- IUCN category IV (habitat/species management area)
- Location within North Dakota Location within the United States
- Location: Slope County, North Dakota, United States
- Nearest city: Bowman, ND
- Coordinates: 46°20′42″N 103°26′10″W
- Area: 2,230 acres (900 ha)
- Governing body: U.S. Fish and Wildlife Service

Stewart Lake National Wildlife Refuge is a 2,230-acre (900 ha) National Wildlife Refuge (NWR) in the U.S. state of North Dakota. Almost 1,600 acres (650 ha) of Stewart Lake NWR is an easement refuge and is on privately owned land, but the landowners and U.S. Government work cooperatively to protect the resources. The remaining acreage is on public lands. The U.S. Fish and Wildlife Service oversees Stewart Lake NWR from their offices at Audubon National Wildlife Refuge.
