= Riverdale School District 89 =

School district in North Dakota, United States

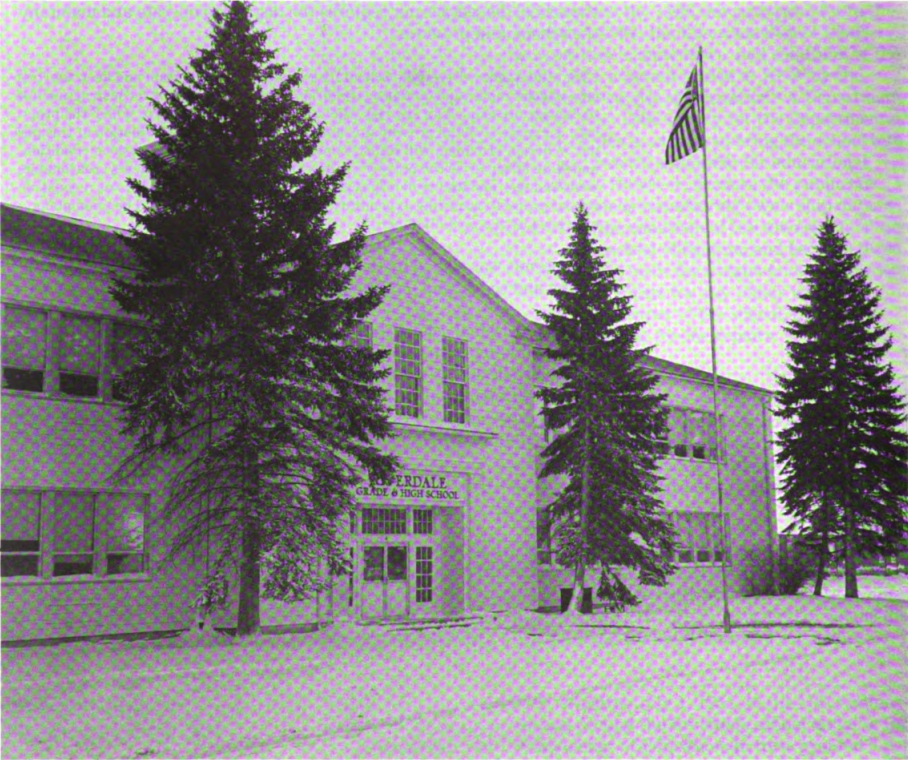
Riverdale Grade and High School, 1988

Riverdale School District 89 was a school district headquartered in Riverdale, North Dakota.

The Riverdale School District had portions in Mercer County and in McLean County. The Associated Press described the district as "divided equally" between the counties.

== History ==
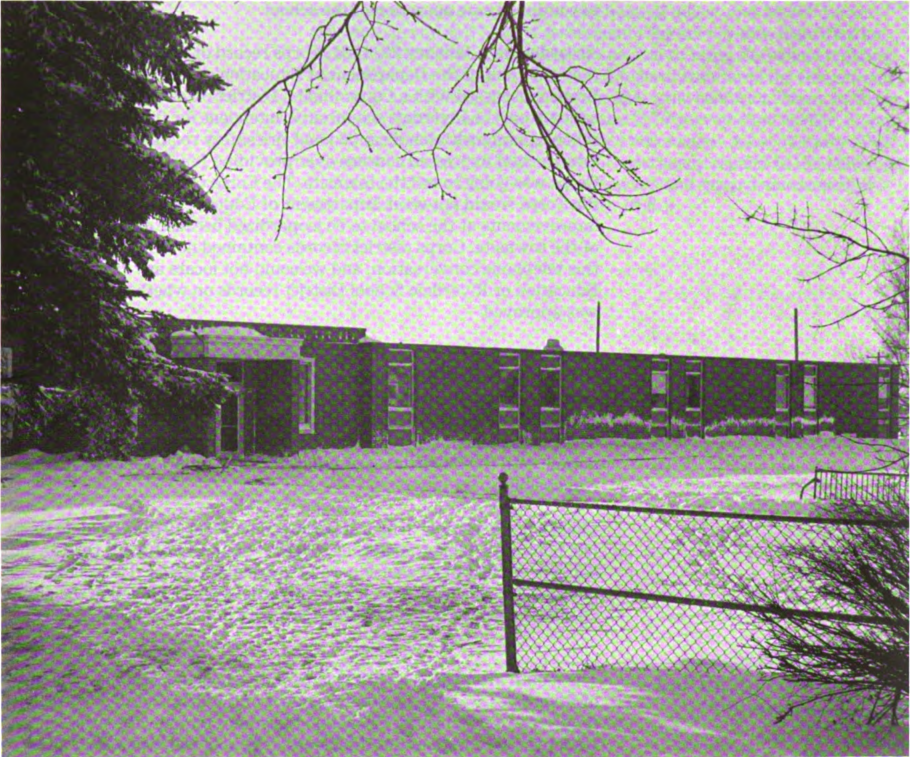
Elementary school addition

In March 1951 the district was established taking the third section of the former North Dakota Victoria School District Number 7, which had been created in 1906. The Riverdale Grade and High School, then a part of the North Dakota Victoria School District, and built by the U.S. Army Corps of Engineers, opened in 1948. The federal government of the United States owned that school building though it did not provide educational services there. The first principal of the Riverdale School was A. G. Pritchet. The high school had not yet been established in 1948, and so the district contracted with Garrison, North Dakota's school system for high school services. In 1948 there was overcrowding as a number of students who had not yet signed up to go to school began attending classes.

The first graduation ceremony occurred in 1950.

At one point the Pick City Sitka school consolidated into the Riverdale School.

In 1953, the North Dakota State Department of Public Instruction began to recognize the school district.

In 1963, a boiler room was added to the building. In 1971, a separate building was established for elementary school classes.

In 1986, the federal government gave the school facility to the city government, so the city government now owned it.

The high school had an interactive television (ITV) studio.

The high school closed in 1992, with students east of the Missouri River in McClean County transferring to the high school in Underwood, North Dakota and students west of the Missouri River in Mercer County transferring to high schools in Stanton, North Dakota and Hazen, North Dakota. Students south of Highway 1806 in Mercer County had a choice between the Stanton and Hazen high schools. The Riverdale school district had a tuition agreement with the Underwood school district. In 1992 area residents criticized the federal government's move to ask for money back that the federal government believed had not supposed to have been given to the school. Only three students graduated in 1992. The ITV studio was to be moved to Bismarck State College. After 1992, there was an elementary school remaining in Riverdale.

By 1993 the district shared a superintendent with the Underwood School District 8. That year, Wade Faul filled that position.

=== Closure ===
In 1993 members of the Riverdale School District school board voted to abolish their school district, with the Underwood and Hazen districts to obtain pieces of it. Circa 1993 there was a campaign to move portions of the Riverdale school district into the Hazen school district, which would have resulted in the elementary school closing. Four members of the North Dakota Annexation Board voted against the petition to have the transfer occur, while three voted in favor. The petition was later refiled.

Circa 1994 a decision was made to abolish Riverdale Elementary School. In 1994 the leadership of the Hazen district wanted to modify the proposed border between the Hazen and Underwood districts. By March 1994 there was a conflict between the Hazen, Underwood, and Stanton districts over which district would take which pieces of the former Riverdale school district. There were separate school reorganizing committees for each county, and each made a different decision, which meant that the state government had to decide how the district would be divided. In April 1994, three state board members voted for a plan to give 78% of the district's taxable valuation to Underwood, while two voted against it.

The last day of school was May 23, 1994. The Riverdale district ceased to exist on July 1, 1994.

=== Post-closure ===
The former high school became a hotel and restaurant.

== Athletics ==
The high school athletic teams of the former school were named the Knights and the school colors were red and white. The school fielded a nine-man football team. The team played local nine-man teams including Stanton, Goodrich, White Shield, Halliday, McClusky and Bowdon.

== See also ==
- List of high schools in North Dakota
