= Lake Patricia National Wildlife Refuge =

Protected area in North Dakota, United States

- IUCN category IV (habitat/species management area)
- Location within the United States
- Location: Morton County, North Dakota, USA
- Nearest city: Bismarck, ND
- Coordinates: 46°27′48″N 101°11′02″W
- Area: 800 acres (320 ha) in 2010
- Governing body: U.S. Fish and Wildlife Service

Lake Patricia National Wildlife Refuge is an 800-acre (320 ha) National Wildlife Refuge (NWR) in the U.S. state of North Dakota. The refuge is an Easement refuge that is entirely on privately owned land, but the landowners and U.S. Government work cooperatively to protect the resources. The U.S. Fish and Wildlife Service oversees Lake Patricia NWR from offices at Audubon National Wildlife Refuge.
