= Lost Lake National Wildlife Refuge =

Protected area in North Dakota, United States

- IUCN category IV (habitat/species management area)
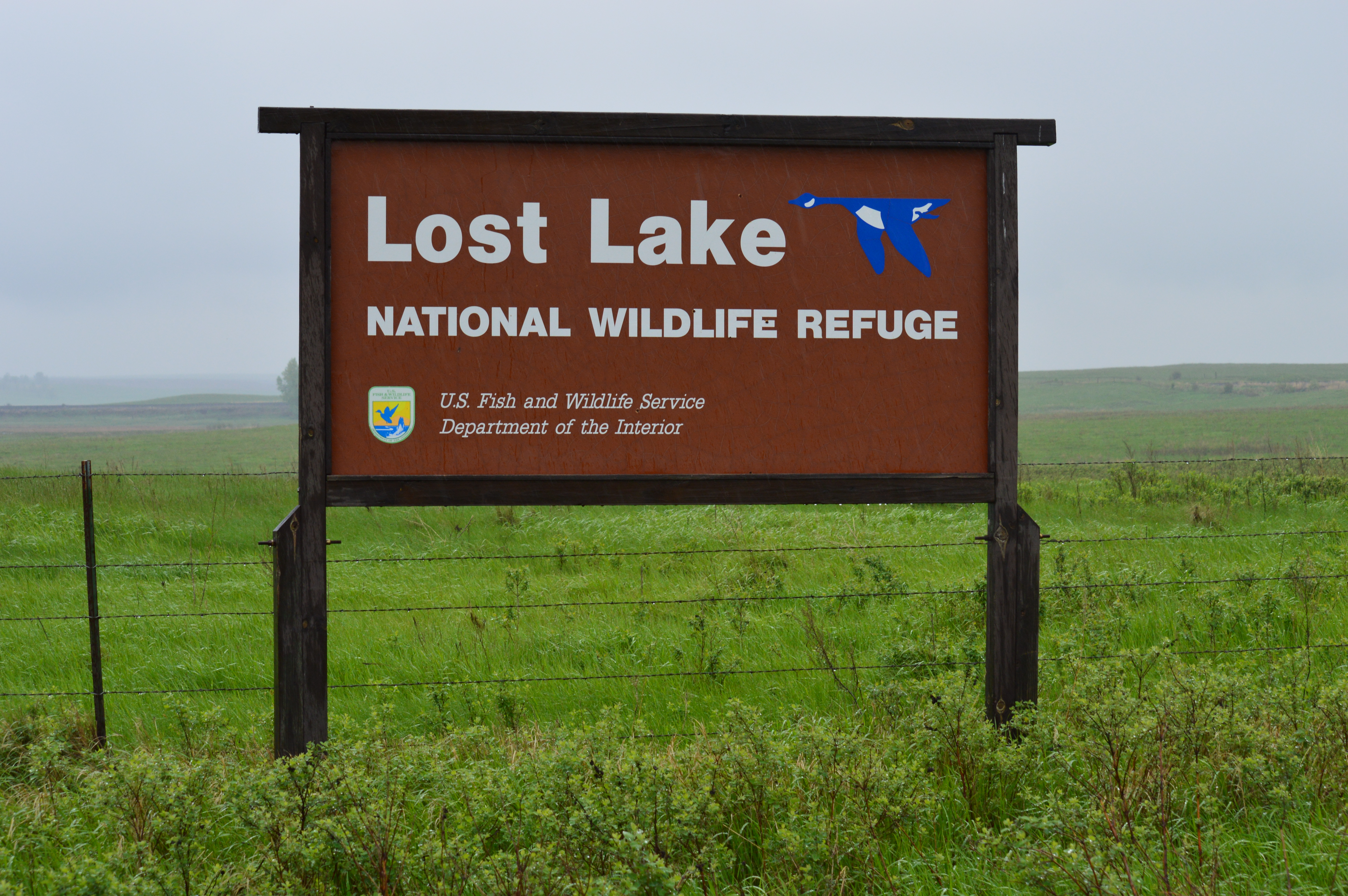

- Location within the United States
- Location: McLean County, North Dakota, USA
- Nearest city: Washburn, ND
- Coordinates: 47°15′04″N 100°53′20″W
- Area: 960 acres (390 ha)
- Governing body: U.S. Fish and Wildlife Service

Lost Lake National Wildlife Refuge is a 960-acre (390 ha) National Wildlife Refuge (NWR) in the U.S. state of North Dakota. Lost Lake NWR is an easement refuge and is on privately owned land, but the landowners and U.S. Government work cooperatively to protect the resources. The U.S. Fish and Wildlife Service oversees Lost Lake NWR from offices at Audubon National Wildlife Refuge.
