= McLean National Wildlife Refuge =

Protected area in North Dakota, United States

- IUCN category IV (habitat/species management area)
- Location within the United States
- Location: McLean County, North Dakota, USA
- Nearest city: Minot, ND
- Coordinates: 47°48′33″N 101°57′18″W
- Area: 760 acres (310 ha)
- Governing body: U.S. Fish and Wildlife Service

McLean National Wildlife Refuge is a 760-acre (310 ha) National Wildlife Refuge (NWR) in the U.S. state of North Dakota. A little less than half the acreage of McLean NWR is on public lands, while the rest is an easement refuge and is on privately owned land, but the landowners and U.S. Government work cooperatively to protect the resources. The U.S. Fish and Wildlife Service oversees McLean NWR from their offices at Audubon National Wildlife Refuge.

Originally called Lake Susie NWR, the refuge was originally established by then president Franklin D. Roosevelt in 1939. The name of the refuge was changed to its current title in the 1990s.
