= Underwood School District 8 =

School district in North Dakota, United States

Coordinates: 47.456515°N 101.143280°W

Underwood Public School or Underwood High School (UHS) is the public school district and associated school system headquartered in Underwood, North Dakota, United States. Operating as Underwood school District 8, the district serves students spanning pre kindergarten through 12th grade. Geographically, the district covers portions of Mclean County, including the communities of Underwood, Coleharbor, and Riverdale and extends westward into Mercer county to incorporate Pick City. The district operates local educational facilities serving approximately 190 students with low student and teacher ratio.

Within McLean County, the district includes Underwood, Coleharbor, and Riverdale. The district extends into Mercer County, where it includes Pick City.

== History ==
In 1992, the high school of Riverdale School District 89 closed. The Underwood district entered into a tuition agreement with the Riverdale district 89 so some Riverdale students could go to Underwood. By 1993 the district shared a superintendent with Riverdale 89. That year, Wade Faul filled that position.

The Underwood district absorbed sections of Riverdale School District 89, taking about 78% of the district's taxable valuation, after that district closed entirely in 1994. The Riverdale district ceased to exist on July 1, 1994. The number of seats on the board of trustees increased from five to seven.
