= John Rooney (murderer) =

American convicted murderer (1880–1905)

John Rooney (1880 – 17 October 1905) was an American convicted murderer who was the last person executed by North Dakota.

On 26 August 1902, a farm worker named Harold Sweet was shot and killed during a robbery near the Chicago, Milwaukee & St. Paul Railroad tracks on the west side of Fargo, North Dakota. Rooney was arrested and charged with first degree murder. In January 1903, Rooney was convicted by a jury and on 31 March 1903, he was sentenced to death by hanging.

Rooney's appeals went to the Supreme Court of the United States in Rooney v. North Dakota. Rooney argued that because on 9 March 1903, the North Dakota Legislature had changed the law to mandate that all executions should be conducted in a prison rather than in public, the application of his sentence was being applied ex post facto, since no such law existed at the time of the murder. The Supreme Court rejected this argument, holding that "the place of execution, when the punishment is death, within the limits of the state, is of no practical consequence to the criminal."

Rooney was hanged at the North Dakota State Penitentiary in Bismarck on 17 October 1905. It was the first execution in North Dakota's history to be held in a prison as opposed to in public. It was not only the first execution in the state prison, but the last as capital punishment was abolished by the state. Other condemned prisoners had their sentences reduced to natural life in prison.

North Dakota abolished capital punishment in 1973.

== See also ==
- Capital punishment in North Dakota
- List of most recent executions by jurisdiction
- List of people executed in North Dakota
