= Ruso, North Dakota =

- City
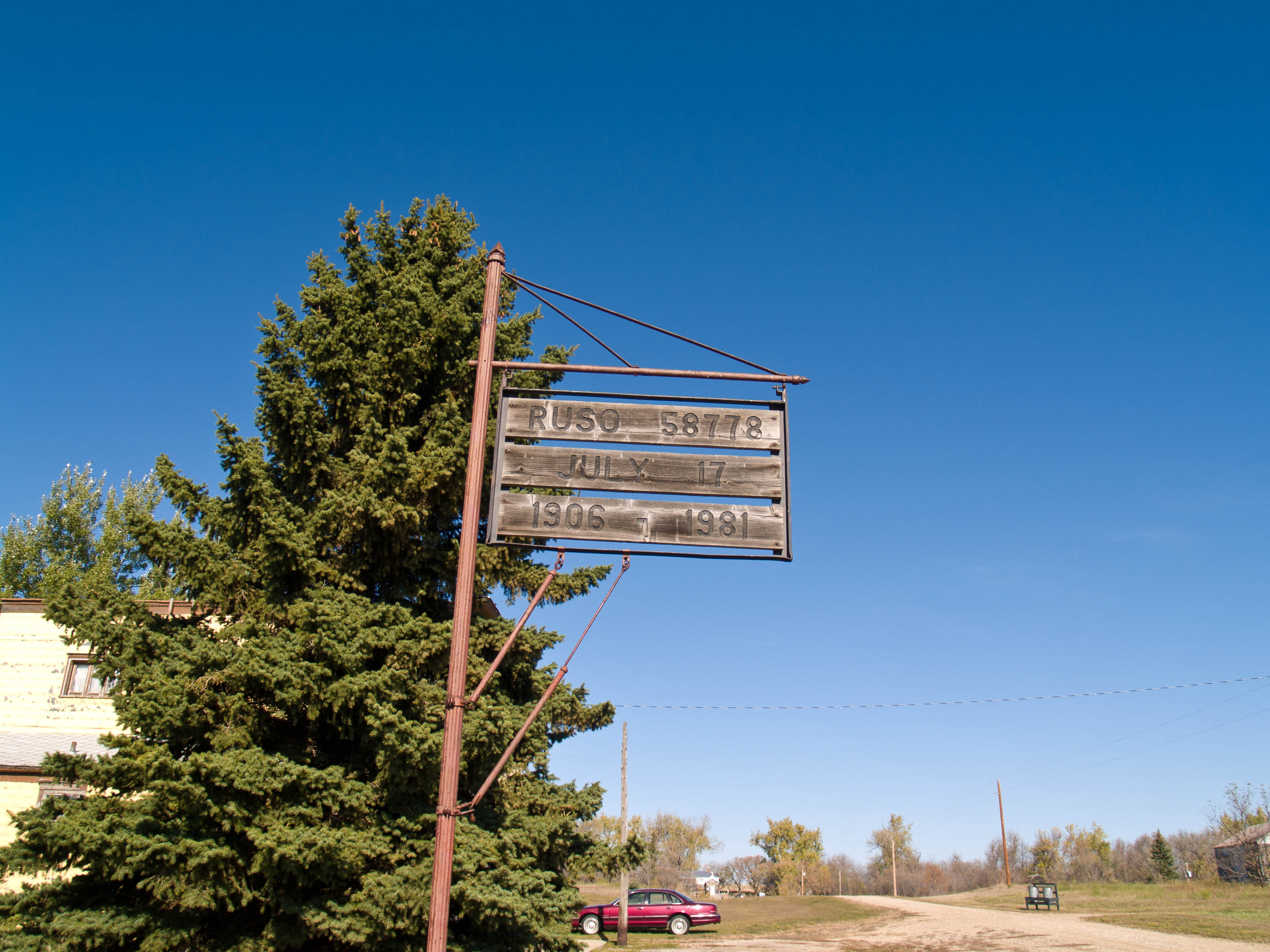

- Location in McLean County and the state of North Dakota
- Coordinates: 47°50′14″N 100°56′03″W
- Country: United States
- State: North Dakota
- County: McLean
- Founded: July 17, 1906
- Incorporated: July 7, 1909

Area
  - Total: 0.25 sq mi (0.64 km^{2})
  - Land: 0.25 sq mi (0.64 km^{2})
  - Water: 0 sq mi (0.00 km^{2})
- Elevation: 2,073 ft (632 m)

Population (2020)
  - Total: 1
  - Estimate (2024): 5
  - Density: 4.0/sq mi (1.55/km^{2})
- Time zone: UTC–6 (Central (CST))
  - Summer (DST): UTC–5 (CDT)
- ZIP Code: 58778
- Area code: 701
- FIPS code: 38-69140
- GNIS feature ID: 1036247

Ruso is a city in McLean County, North Dakota, in the USA. The population was 1 at the 2020 census, making Ruso the least populous incorporated place in North Dakota. It is tied with Monowi, Nebraska at being the least populated community in the United States that is currently inhabited.

== History ==
Ruso was founded and named on July 17, 1906, and named either after a Russian word meaning "south of us" or from the first two letters in both of the words "South Russia" by an agent who brought in immigrants from Russia. Ruso was incorporated as a city on July 7, 1909.

The city lost its last business in 1956.

In 2018 Ruso was at risk of being unincorporated after the death of its mayor, Bruce Lorenz, brought it down to two residents. North Dakota Century Code requires that an incorporated city have at least three council members. However, two new residents built a house in Ruso, doubling its population. One of those residents, Greg Schmaltz, became the new mayor and prevented the town from being unincorporated.

Three tornadoes struck the Ruso area on August 15, 2022, flipping over farm equipment and anhydrous tanks.

== Geography ==
Ruso is in northeastern McLean County, on the west side of North Dakota Highway 41, which leads north 15 miles (24 km) to Velva and south 23 miles (37 km) to Turtle Lake. North Dakota Highway 53 passes just south of Ruso, leading east 13 miles (21 km) to Butte and west 18 miles (29 km) to Max. Washburn, the McLean county seat, is 46 miles (74 km) south of Ruso.

The New Town Subdivision of the CPKC railroad passes through Ruso, leading east to Drake and west to Max.

According to the U.S. Census Bureau, the city of Ruso has a total area of 0.25 square miles (0.65 km^{2}), all land.

== Demographics ==
Historical population
Census	Pop.	Note	%±
1910	141		—
1920	120		−14.9%
1930	104		−13.3%
1940	65		−37.5%
1950	37		−43.1%
1960	31		−16.2%
1970	15		−51.6%
1980	12		−20.0%
1990	8		−33.3%
2000	6		−25.0%
2010	4		−33.3%
2020	1		−75.0%
2024 (est.)	5		400.0%
U.S. Decennial Census; 2020 Census

=== 2020 census ===
As of the 2020 census, there was one person and zero families residing in the city. There were four housing units.

=== 2010 census ===
As of the 2010 census, there were 4 people, 1 household containing 1 family residing in the city. The population density was 16.0 inhabitants per square mile (6.2/km^{2}). There were 3 housing units at an average density of 12.0 per square mile (4.6/km^{2}). The racial makeup of the city was 100.0% White.

There were 3 households, of which one was a married couple living together and the other two single people living alone. 1 household was a person living alone who was 65 years of age or older. The average household size was 1.33 and the average family size was 2.00.

The median age in the city was 58.5 years. 0.0% of residents were under the age of 18; 0.0% were between the ages of 18 and 24; 0.0% were from 25 to 44; 75% were from 45 to 64; and 25% were 65 years of age or older. The gender makeup of the city was 75.0% male and 25.0% female.

=== 2000 census ===
As of the 2000 census, there were 6 people, 3 households, and 3 families residing in the city. The population density was 23.9 people per square mile (9.3/km^{2}). There were three housing units at an average density of 11.9 per square mile (4.6/km^{2}). The racial makeup of the city was 100% White.

There were three households, out of which none had children under the age of 18 living with them, and 100% were married couples living together. The average household size was two and the average family size was two.

In the city, the population was spread out, with 33.3% from 25 to 44, 33.3% from 45 to 64, and 33.3% who were 65 years of age or older. The median age was 58 years. There were three males and three females.

The median income for a household in the city was $41,250, and the median income for a family was $41,250. The per capita income for the city was $21,050. None of the population and none of the families were below the poverty line.

== Education ==
It is within the Velva Public School District 1.
