= White Lake National Wildlife Refuge =

Protected area in North Dakota, United States

- IUCN category IV (habitat/species management area)
- Location within the United States
- Location: Slope County, North Dakota, United States
- Nearest city: Dickinson, ND
- Coordinates: 46°28′32″N 103°12′48″W
- Area: 1,040 acres (420 ha)
- Governing body: U.S. Fish and Wildlife Service
- Website: White Lake National Wildlife Refuge

White Lake National Wildlife Refuge is a 1,040-acre (420 ha) National Wildlife Refuge (NWR) in the U.S. state of North Dakota. White Lake NWR is entirely on public land and in a very remote region. The U.S. Fish and Wildlife Service oversees White Lake NWR from their offices at Audubon National Wildlife Refuge.
