= Capital punishment in North Dakota =

Capital punishment was abolished in the U.S. state of North Dakota in 1973. Historically, a total of eight people have been executed in North Dakota, including one execution prior to North Dakota attaining statehood.

== History ==
According to the North Dakota Penal Code, the imposing of sentences was handed to a jury, with the suggested punishment for first-degree murder being death by hanging or life imprisonment. Until 1903 executions were carried out in public. The first private execution was that of John Rooney, who was hanged inside the Cass County prison on October 17, 1905. Rooney was the last person executed in North Dakota. In 1915, capital punishment was abolished for ordinary murder, commuting the death sentence of Joe Milo, who was convicted of double murder in the course of a robbery. It remained for treason and murder committed by an inmate already serving a life sentence; however, nobody was executed for these offenses until capital punishment was finally abolished in 1973.

No federal executions have ever taken place in North Dakota. On February 8, 2007, Alfonso Rodriguez, Jr. was sentenced to death for the kidnapping and murder of Dru Sjodin and was formerly the only person on federal death row for a crime committed in North Dakota. Because Rodriguez took Sjodin's corpse across state lines, he was eligible for federal prosecution, and therefore for the death penalty. U.S. District Judge Ralph R. Erickson arranged that Rodriguez would be executed according to South Dakota rules. Rodriguez was the first person in North Dakota to receive a death sentence in over a century.

Following the lynching of Charles Bannon in 1931, State Senator James P. Cain introduced a bill to reinstate capital punishment for murder in North Dakota. Supporters of the bill argued that the lynching would not have occurred if Bannon could have faced a death sentence. The North Dakota Senate rejected the bill in a 28-21 vote.

== See also ==
- List of people executed in North Dakota
- Crime in North Dakota
- Law of North Dakota
