= Alon Wieland =

American politician (1935–2022)

Member of the North Dakota House of Representatives from the 13th district
- In office 2003–2014

Personal details
- Born: April 26, 1935 Underwood, North Dakota, U.S.
- Died: January 22, 2022 (aged 86) West Fargo, North Dakota, U.S.
- Party: Republican
- Spouse: Merle
- Education: North Dakota State University
- Profession: Businessman

Alon Carl Wieland (April 26, 1935 – January 22, 2022) was an American politician in the state of North Dakota. He was a member of the North Dakota House of Representatives, from 2002 to 2014. representing the 13th district. A Republican, he was first elected in 2002. An alumnus of North Dakota State University (BA, MA), he was a former commissioner of Cass County, North Dakota from 1983 to 2003, member of the Cass County Social Service Board, and former president of the North Dakota County Commissioners Association. Wieland died at Sheyenne Crossings in West Fargo, North Dakota, on January 22, 2022, at the age of 86. Alon Wieland is survived by four daughters: Susie Carrillo, Lori Brokofsky, Shari Neece and Lisa Crew
