= Lynching of Charles Bannon =

Last lynching in North Dakota, in 1931

- Location: North Dakota, U.S.
- Date: January 29, 1931; 95 years ago
- Attack type: Homicide by lynching
- Deaths: 1
- Victims: Charles Bannon, aged 22

The lynching of Charles Bannon took place in the US state of North Dakota on January 29, 1931. The self-confessed killer of a family of six, Bannon was taken from the jail in Schafer and hanged from a bridge, becoming the last victim of a lynching in the state.

== Background ==
Charles Bannon, aged 22, was a hired hand on the Haven family farm just north of Schafer. The family consisted of the parents and four children, the youngest of whom was two months old. They had been there for over ten years and apparently were well off. After February 9, 1930, no member of the family had been seen. Bannon stayed on the farm, telling the neighbors that the Havens had left and he was renting from them. Together with his father James, he took care of the livestock, staying there until the fall. In October they began selling property and crops, raising suspicion among the neighbors, and the father left for Oregon, allegedly to search for the Havens. In December, Charles was arrested and charged with grand larceny, and during the investigation it was discovered that the Havens had been murdered.

Bannon soon admitted guilt, giving first a statement and then two confessions, in which the details changed slightly. He confessed to having accidentally killed one of the children, and then killing all the others out of fear. He claimed his father had been innocent, but the father was also arrested, in Oregon, and moved back to North Dakota as an alleged accomplice.

== Lynching ==
Bannon was first housed in the Williston jail, which was more secure than the one in Schafer, but had been moved back, on January 23, 1931, for his arraignment on six murder charges. Bannon, his father James, Deputy Sheriff Peter Hallan, and Fred Maike, who was in jail on theft charges, were there as well. On January 29, between 12:30 and 1 AM, a well-organized group of more than 75 men came to the jail with over 15 cars, waking sheriff Syvert Thompson, who lived nearby. As he went over to the jail, he was captured and taken away. The mob broke down the door, took Deputy Hallan away, and then broke down the door to the cell. Bannon surrendered, asking the mob not to harm his father. He was dragged from the jail with a noose around his neck and taken to the Haven farm, but the person taking care of the farm threatened to shoot if the crowd didn't leave.

Bannon was then taken to the Cherry Creek bridge, a new high bridge half a mile from the jail, that had been built the previous summer. He was pushed over the side and hanged; according to authorities, whoever tied the hangman's knot must have had "expert knowledge." His body was later taken for burial in Williston.

According to the book End of the Rope by Dennis Edward Johnson, there were several reasons why the mob was incited to lynch Charles Bannon. One reason was that many in the community suspected that Bannon was responsible for a 1925 house fire in rural McKenzie County that killed the children of one family. The parents had gone to Watford City and upon returning home found the house burned and the children nowhere to be found. Bannon had worked for the family. The speculation as to Bannon's responsibility in the house fire was also reported in a July 10, 1988 Williston Herald article entitled "Fair Project Recounts 1930's Murder and Lynching" and a subsequent 1988 letter-to-the-editor of the Williston Herald, in response to the article, entitled "Mob Justice Means Whole Story Won't be Known" by Audrey Amlien Allex. Although there is incorrect information regarding the number, ages and/or gender of the children in the July 10, 1988 newspaper article and the recollections in End of the Rope, the Thursday, October 22, 1925, edition of the McKenzie County Farmer newspaper reported that the fire occurred on October 19, 1925, and that the children lost in the fire were those of Mr. and Mrs. John [Ingeborg] Amlien. The children were [Karen-]Julia, 14 years old, George, 12, Elmer, 8 and Jennie, 5; two boys and two girls.

== Aftermath ==
The lynching prompted Governor George F. Shafer to call for an investigation. James Morris, then the state's attorney general and later a Supreme Court justice, as well as a trial judge in a post-World War II war crimes trial, led the investigation. He commented on how the noose was tied, noted that a possible manufacturer's mark was present in the rope, and stated that the lynching had been carefully planned, with the mob controlled by three or more people in charge. No member of the mob was ever arrested, and within a week Morris surmised that none of the assailants were ever going to be identified. An investigation by the Federal Council of Churches that summer concluded that authorities were to blame for putting Bannon in a situation in which a mob could easily lynch him; a 1990 study found the same thing, and that none of the victims of lynchings in North Dakota were properly protected by authorities.

James Bannon was then tried for the Haven murders; the trial took place in Divide County, North Dakota, and he was convicted. His attorneys lost an appeal to the state's Supreme Court, and went to prison on June 29, 1931, to serve a life sentence. He asked for parole in 1939, but Alvin C. Strutz, another future Supreme Court justice, found that the community believed he was at least guilty of the cover-up. He was paroled in 1950, at age 76.

Following the lynching, State Senator James P. Cain introduced a bill to reinstate capital punishment for murder in North Dakota. Supporters of the bill argued that the lynching would not have occurred had Bannon faced a death sentence. The North Dakota Senate rejected the bill in a 28–21 vote.

== In popular culture ==
The lynching became the basis for the 2023 film End Of The Rope directed by Charlie Griak and starring Nick Saxton as Bannon.

== See also ==
- Capital punishment in North Dakota
