= Schafer, North Dakota =

- Unincorporated area
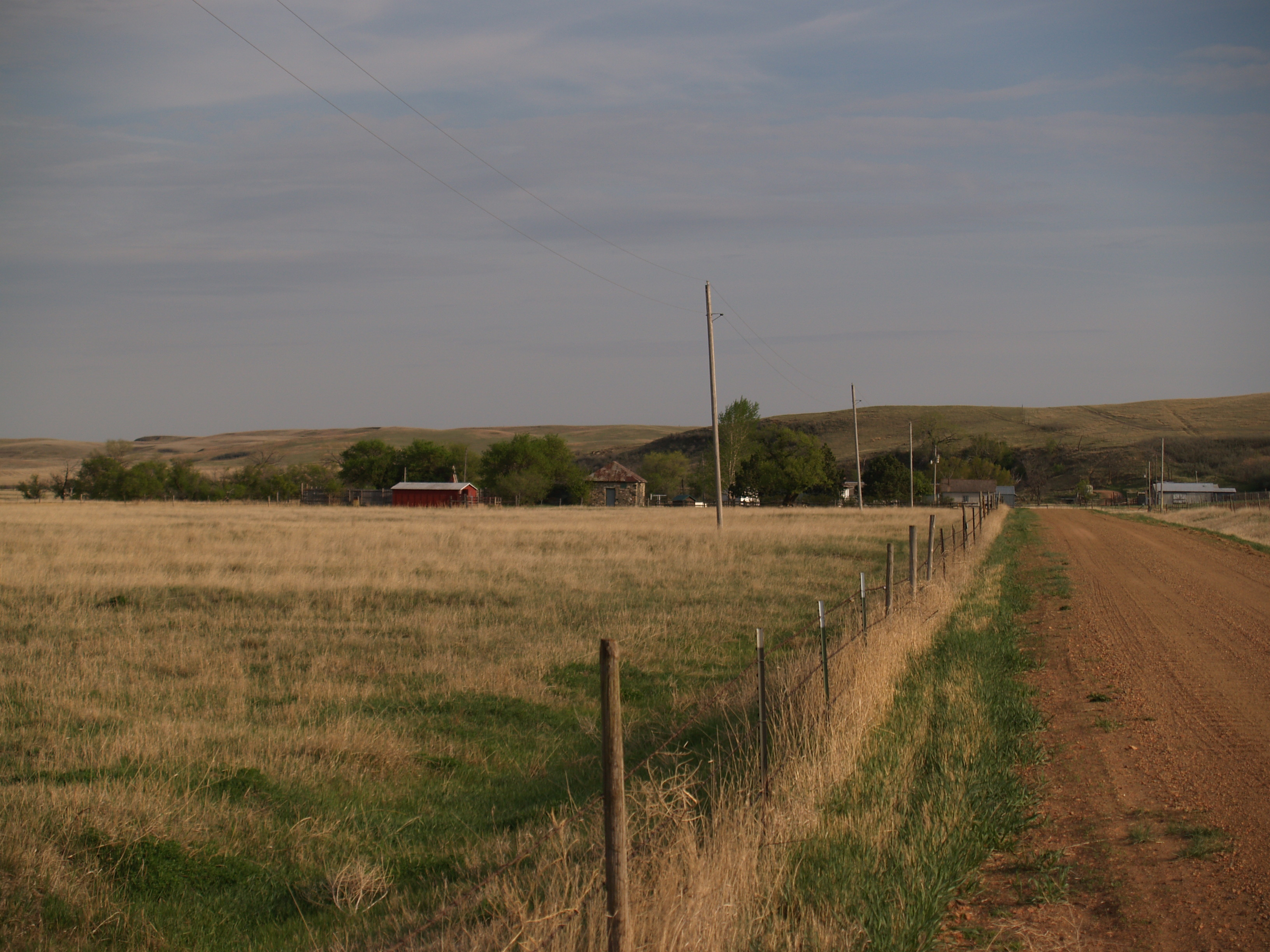
- Fenceline along a road in Schafer

- Location within North Dakota Location within the United States
- Coordinates: 47°47′58″N 103°11′12″W
- Country: United States
- State: North Dakota
- County: McKenzie
- Elevation: 2,005 ft (611 m)
- Time zone: UTC-6 (Central (CST))
  - Summer (DST): UTC-5 (CDT)
- Area code: 701
- GNIS feature ID: 1031373

Schafer is an unincorporated area and the former county seat of McKenzie County, North Dakota, United States. The county seat was moved to Watford City, and is now a ghost town. However, the town would still have existed if not for a land dispute between the Schafer family and the Great Northern Railway. The railroad never laid tracks due to this, but grading was done to the Missouri River.

The farm of Albert and Lulia Haven was located just to the north of Schafer; they and their four children were murdered in February 1930. Charles Bannon, their hired hand, confessed to the killing; he became the last man in the state of North Dakota to be lynched. The only remaining sign of the town is the old county jail, from which Bannon was dragged by the lynch mob on the night of his death.
