= Riverdale, North Dakota =

- City
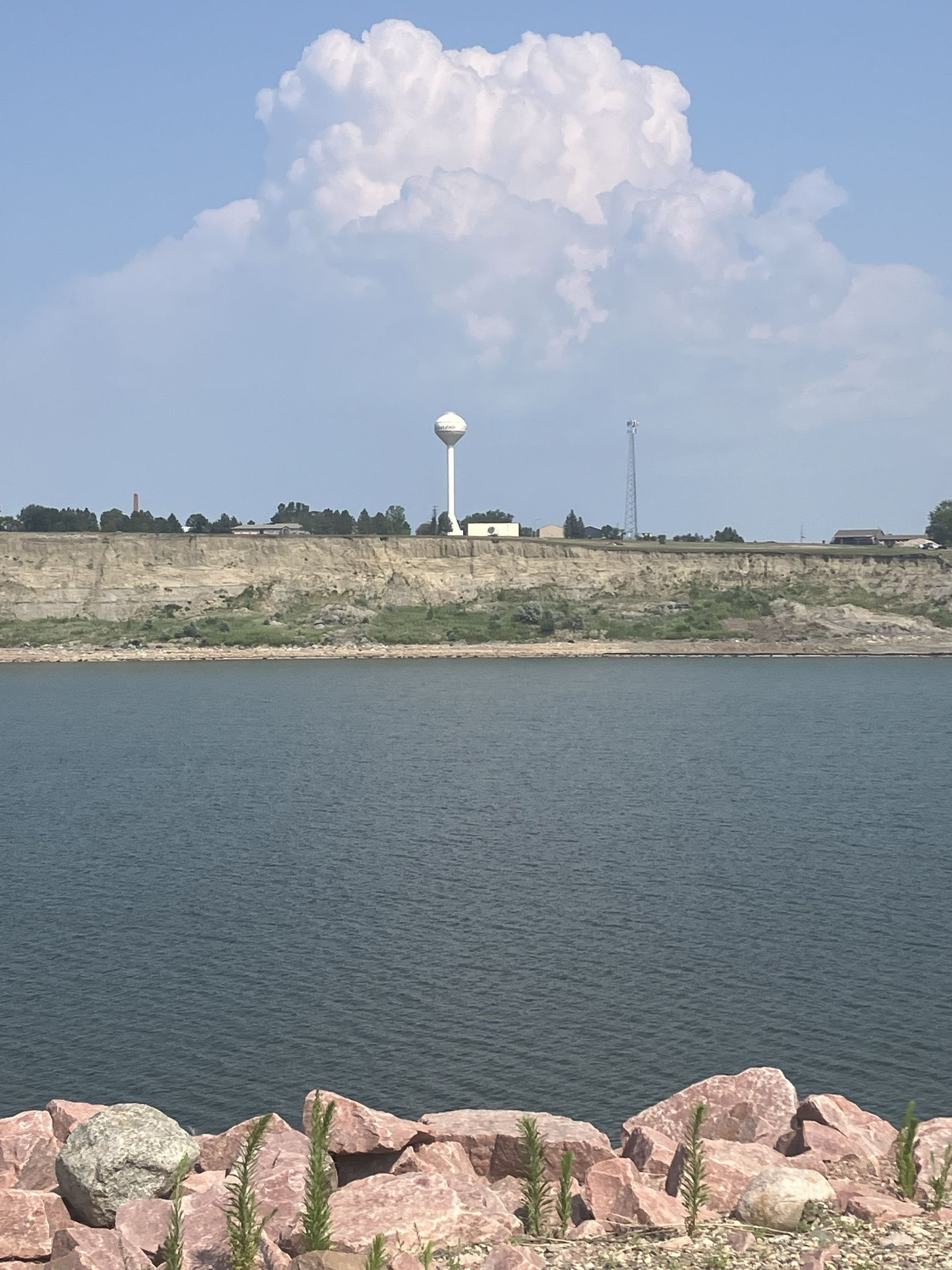

- Logo

- Location of Riverdale, North Dakota
- Coordinates: 47°29′51″N 101°21′58″W
- Country: United States
- State: North Dakota
- County: McLean
- Founded: September 1985
- Incorporated: October 1985

Area
  - Total: 1.39 sq mi (3.59 km^{2})
  - Land: 1.39 sq mi (3.59 km^{2})
  - Water: 0 sq mi (0.00 km^{2})
- Elevation: 1,962 ft (598 m)

Population (2020)
  - Total: 223
  - Estimate (2022): 223
  - Density: 160.7/sq mi (62.06/km^{2})
- Time zone: UTC-6 (Central (CST))
  - Summer (DST): UTC-5 (CDT)
- ZIP code: 58565
- Area code: 701
- FIPS code: 38-66980
- GNIS feature ID: 1036239
- Website: riverdalenorthdakota.com

Riverdale is a city in McLean County, North Dakota, United States. The population was 223 at the 2020 census.

Riverdale was the largest of the construction camps that sprang up in 1946 to house workers building the Garrison Dam just to the west. After the dam was completed in 1953, residents of the other camps (including Dakota City and Big Bend) who decided to stay on relocated to Riverdale. It was operated by the federal government from its establishment until 1986, when it was turned over to the state of North Dakota with incorporation following shortly thereafter.

== Geography ==
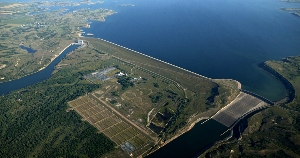
Garrison Dam, near Riverdale. U.S. Army Corps of Engineers, Garrison Project Headquarters are in Riverdale.

According to the United States Census Bureau, the city has a total area of 1.35 square miles (3.50 km^{2}), all land.

== Demographics ==
Historical population
Census	Pop.	Note	%±
1990	283		—
2000	273		−3.5%
2010	205		−24.9%
2020	223		8.8%
2022 (est.)	223		0.0%
U.S. Decennial Census; 2020 Census

=== 2010 census ===
As of the census of 2010, there were 205 people, 103 households, and 67 families residing in the city. The population density was 151.9 inhabitants per square mile (58.6/km^{2}). There were 188 housing units at an average density of 139.3 per square mile (53.8/km^{2}). The racial makeup of the city was 94.6% White, 2.9% Native American, 2.0% Asian, and 0.5% from two or more races.

There were 103 households, of which 11.7% had children under the age of 18 living with them, 61.2% were married couples living together, 2.9% had a female householder with no husband present, 1.0% had a male householder with no wife present, and 35.0% were non-families. 30.1% of all households were made up of individuals, and 10.7% had someone living alone who was 65 years of age or older. The average household size was 1.99 and the average family size was 2.40.

The median age in the city was 56.2 years. 9.8% of residents were under the age of 18; 3% were between the ages of 18 and 24; 14.6% were from 25 to 44; 48.7% were from 45 to 64; and 23.9% were 65 years of age or older. The gender makeup of the city was 50.7% male and 49.3% female.

=== 2000 census ===
As of the census of 2000, there were 273 people, 108 households, and 84 families residing in the city. The population density was 195.1 inhabitants per square mile (75.3/km^{2}). There were 157 housing units at an average density of 112.2 per square mile (43.3/km^{2}). The racial makeup of the city was 96.34% White, 2.20% Native American, 0.73% Asian, and 0.73% from two or more races.

There were 108 households, out of which 27.8% had children under the age of 18 living with them, 75.9% were married couples living together, 0.9% had a female householder with no husband present, and 21.3% were non-families. 19.4% of all households were made up of individuals, and 5.6% had someone living alone who was 65 years of age or older. The average household size was 2.53 and the average family size was 2.86.

In the city, the population was spread out, with 22.7% under the age of 18, 4.4% from 18 to 24, 21.6% from 25 to 44, 31.5% from 45 to 64, and 19.8% who were 65 years of age or older. The median age was 46 years. For every 100 females, there were 103.7 males. For every 100 females age 18 and over, there were 113.1 males.

The median income for a household in the city was $48,333, and the median income for a family was $52,250. Males had a median income of $50,972 versus $27,500 for females. The per capita income for the city was $18,970. None of the families and 3.8% of the population were living below the poverty line, including no under eighteens and 5.7% of those over 64.

== Climate ==
This climatic region is typified by large seasonal temperature differences, with warm to hot (and often humid) summers and cold (sometimes severely cold) winters. According to the Köppen Climate Classification system, Riverdale has a humid continental climate, abbreviated "Dfb" on climate maps.

Climate data for Riverdale, North Dakota (1991–2020 normals, extremes 1948–present)
Month	Jan	Feb	Mar	Apr	May	Jun	Jul	Aug	Sep	Oct	Nov	Dec	Year
Record high °F (°C)	56 (13)	65 (18)	87 (31)	92 (33)	97 (36)	99 (37)	105 (41)	105 (41)	105 (41)	95 (35)	78 (26)	61 (16)	105 (41)
Mean daily maximum °F (°C)	20.2 (−6.6)	23.5 (−4.7)	36.7 (2.6)	52.3 (11.3)	65.1 (18.4)	74.1 (23.4)	80.7 (27.1)	79.9 (26.6)	71.1 (21.7)	53.8 (12.1)	37.4 (3.0)	24.7 (−4.1)	51.6 (10.9)
Daily mean °F (°C)	11.7 (−11.3)	15.1 (−9.4)	27.3 (−2.6)	41.5 (5.3)	53.5 (11.9)	63.5 (17.5)	69.6 (20.9)	68.3 (20.2)	59.4 (15.2)	44.7 (7.1)	29.2 (−1.6)	18.1 (−7.7)	41.8 (5.4)
Mean daily minimum °F (°C)	3.1 (−16.1)	6.7 (−14.1)	17.9 (−7.8)	30.7 (−0.7)	42.0 (5.6)	52.8 (11.6)	58.5 (14.7)	56.6 (13.7)	47.8 (8.8)	35.5 (1.9)	21.0 (−6.1)	11.4 (−11.4)	32.0 (0.0)
Record low °F (°C)	−40 (−40)	−33 (−36)	−32 (−36)	−5 (−21)	12 (−11)	20 (−7)	34 (1)	34 (1)	16 (−9)	6 (−14)	−20 (−29)	−35 (−37)	−40 (−40)
Source: NOAA

== Education ==
It is within the Underwood Public School District 8.

The North Dakota Victoria School District Number 7 was established in 1906. The Riverdale Grade and High School, then a part of the Victoria School District, opened in 1948. In March 1951, the Riverdale School District 89 was established, taking over section three of the former Victoria district. The high school closed in 1992, After 1992, there was an elementary school remaining in Riverdale. In 1993 members of the Riverdale School District school board voted to abolish their school district, with the Underwood and Hazen districts to obtain pieces of it. Circa 1994 a decision was made to abolish Riverdale Elementary School. The former high school became a hotel and restaurant.
