= Underwood, North Dakota =

- City
- Location of Underwood in McLean County
- Coordinates: 47°27′23″N 101°08′28″W
- Country: United States
- State: North Dakota
- County: McLean
- Founded: July 4, 1903

Government
  - Mayor: Leon Weisenberger

Area
  - Total: 1.02 sq mi (2.63 km^{2})
  - Land: 1.02 sq mi (2.63 km^{2})
  - Water: 0 sq mi (0.00 km^{2})
- Elevation: 2,024 ft (617 m)

Population (2020)
  - Total: 784
  - Estimate (2022): 780
  - Density: 772.7/sq mi (298.35/km^{2})
- Time zone: UTC-6 (Central (CST))
  - Summer (DST): UTC-5 (CDT)
- ZIP code: 58576
- Area code: 701
- FIPS code: 38-80660
- GNIS feature ID: 1036303
- Website: underwoodnd.org

Underwood is a city in McLean County, North Dakota, United States. The population was 784 at the 2020 census.

== History ==
Underwood was founded along a Soo Line Railroad line between Bismarck and Max in 1903 and named after Fred D. Underwood, vice president of the railroad at the time. Alon Wieland, businessman and politician, was born in Underwood.

== Geography ==
According to the United States Census Bureau, the city has a total area of 0.91 square miles (2.36 km^{2}), all land.

== Demographics ==
Historical population
Census	Pop.	Note	%±
1910	422		—
1920	453		7.3%
1930	488		7.7%
1940	613		25.6%
1950	1,061		73.1%
1960	819		−22.8%
1970	781		−4.6%
1980	1,329		70.2%
1990	976		−26.6%
2000	812		−16.8%
2010	778		−4.2%
2020	784		0.8%
2022 (est.)	780		−0.5%
U.S. Decennial Census; 2020 Census

=== 2010 census ===
As of the census of 2010, there were 778 people, 326 households, and 211 families living in the city. The population density was 854.9 inhabitants per square mile (330.1/km^{2}). There were 377 housing units at an average density of 414.3 per square mile (160.0/km^{2}). The racial makeup of the city was 95.5% White, 0.3% African American, 1.8% Native American, 0.3% Pacific Islander, 0.1% from other races, and 2.1% from two or more races. Hispanic or Latino of any race were 0.6% of the population.

There were 326 households, of which 22.4% had children under the age of 18 living with them, 57.1% were married couples living together, 4.6% had a female householder with no husband present, 3.1% had a male householder with no wife present, and 35.3% were non-families. 30.7% of all households were made up of individuals, and 12% had someone living alone who was 65 years of age or older. The average household size was 2.22 and the average family size was 2.77.

The median age in the city was 49.8 years. 18.8% of residents were under the age of 18; 3.5% were between the ages of 18 and 24; 23% were from 25 to 44; 32.9% were from 45 to 64; and 21.7% were 65 years of age or older. The gender makeup of the city was 48.5% male and 51.5% female.

=== 2000 census ===
As of the census of 2000, there were 812 people, 323 households, and 229 families living in the city. The population density was 910.8 inhabitants per square mile (351.7/km^{2}). There were 381 housing units at an average density of 427.3 per square mile (165.0/km^{2}). The racial makeup of the city was 96.80% White, 1.11% Native American, and 2.09% from two or more races. Hispanic or Latino of any race were 0.25% of the population.

There were 323 households, out of which 27.2% had children under the age of 18 living with them, 61.9% were married couples living together, 7.4% had a female householder with no husband present, and 28.8% were non-families. 27.6% of all households were made up of individuals, and 14.6% had someone living alone who was 65 years of age or older. The average household size was 2.35 and the average family size was 2.85.

In the city, the population was spread out, with 20.9% under the age of 18, 6.0% from 18 to 24, 20.7% from 25 to 44, 29.6% from 45 to 64, and 22.8% who were 65 years of age or older. The median age was 46 years. For every 100 females, there were 91.5 males. For every 100 females age 18 and over, there were 89.4 males.

The median income for a household in the city was $35,250, and the median income for a family was $47,578. Males had a median income of $39,375 versus $18,611 for females. The per capita income for the city was $17,916. About 7.1% of families and 11.7% of the population were below the poverty line, including 19.8% of those under age 18 and 14.4% of those age 65 or over.

== Climate ==
This climatic region is typified by large seasonal temperature differences, with warm to hot (and often humid) summers and cold (sometimes severely cold) winters. According to the Köppen Climate Classification system, Underwood has a humid continental climate, abbreviated "Dfb" on climate maps.

Climate data for Underwood, North Dakota (1991–2020 normals, extremes 1954–present)
Month	Jan	Feb	Mar	Apr	May	Jun	Jul	Aug	Sep	Oct	Nov	Dec	Year
Record high °F (°C)	57 (14)	65 (18)	78 (26)	94 (34)	97 (36)	106 (41)	105 (41)	106 (41)	102 (39)	94 (34)	78 (26)	59 (15)	106 (41)
Mean maximum °F (°C)	42.7 (5.9)	45.4 (7.4)	60.8 (16.0)	76.3 (24.6)	85.1 (29.5)	91.1 (32.8)	95.5 (35.3)	97.2 (36.2)	90.9 (32.7)	78.2 (25.7)	58.3 (14.6)	44.4 (6.9)	99.2 (37.3)
Mean daily maximum °F (°C)	18.9 (−7.3)	23.3 (−4.8)	36.4 (2.4)	52.5 (11.4)	65.7 (18.7)	75.1 (23.9)	81.8 (27.7)	81.8 (27.7)	71.0 (21.7)	54.0 (12.2)	36.7 (2.6)	23.8 (−4.6)	51.8 (11.0)
Daily mean °F (°C)	9.8 (−12.3)	13.4 (−10.3)	26.1 (−3.3)	40.7 (4.8)	53.7 (12.1)	63.7 (17.6)	69.6 (20.9)	68.3 (20.2)	58.1 (14.5)	42.9 (6.1)	27.4 (−2.6)	15.4 (−9.2)	40.8 (4.9)
Mean daily minimum °F (°C)	0.7 (−17.4)	3.6 (−15.8)	15.8 (−9.0)	28.8 (−1.8)	41.8 (5.4)	52.3 (11.3)	57.4 (14.1)	54.9 (12.7)	45.3 (7.4)	31.7 (−0.2)	18.1 (−7.7)	7.0 (−13.9)	29.8 (−1.2)
Mean minimum °F (°C)	−21.2 (−29.6)	−17.9 (−27.7)	−5.8 (−21.0)	12.3 (−10.9)	27.6 (−2.4)	41.8 (5.4)	47.3 (8.5)	44.4 (6.9)	32.1 (0.1)	16.9 (−8.4)	0.8 (−17.3)	−15.7 (−26.5)	−24.2 (−31.2)
Record low °F (°C)	−37 (−38)	−36 (−38)	−26 (−32)	−9 (−23)	12 (−11)	31 (−1)	38 (3)	33 (1)	18 (−8)	−6 (−21)	−22 (−30)	−36 (−38)	−37 (−38)
Average precipitation inches (mm)	0.54 (14)	0.50 (13)	0.78 (20)	1.39 (35)	2.59 (66)	3.78 (96)	2.44 (62)	1.68 (43)	1.56 (40)	1.41 (36)	0.73 (19)	0.63 (16)	18.03 (458)
Average snowfall inches (cm)	6.7 (17)	5.0 (13)	6.8 (17)	2.7 (6.9)	0.7 (1.8)	0.0 (0.0)	0.0 (0.0)	0.0 (0.0)	0.0 (0.0)	1.6 (4.1)	4.2 (11)	10.9 (28)	38.6 (98)
Average precipitation days (≥ 0.01 in)	6.1	5.9	6.3	7.0	10.0	11.4	9.3	7.0	6.7	6.7	5.4	6.9	88.7
Average snowy days (≥ 0.1 in)	5.6	5.6	3.8	1.5	0.2	0.0	0.0	0.0	0.0	1.4	3.6	6.3	28.0
Source: NOAA

== Education ==
It is within the Underwood Public School District 8.

Underwood Public School serves the community.

== See also ==
- Blue Flint Ethanol, pioneering bioethanol production plant, based in Underwood
