= McLean County, North Dakota =

County in North Dakota, United States

- County
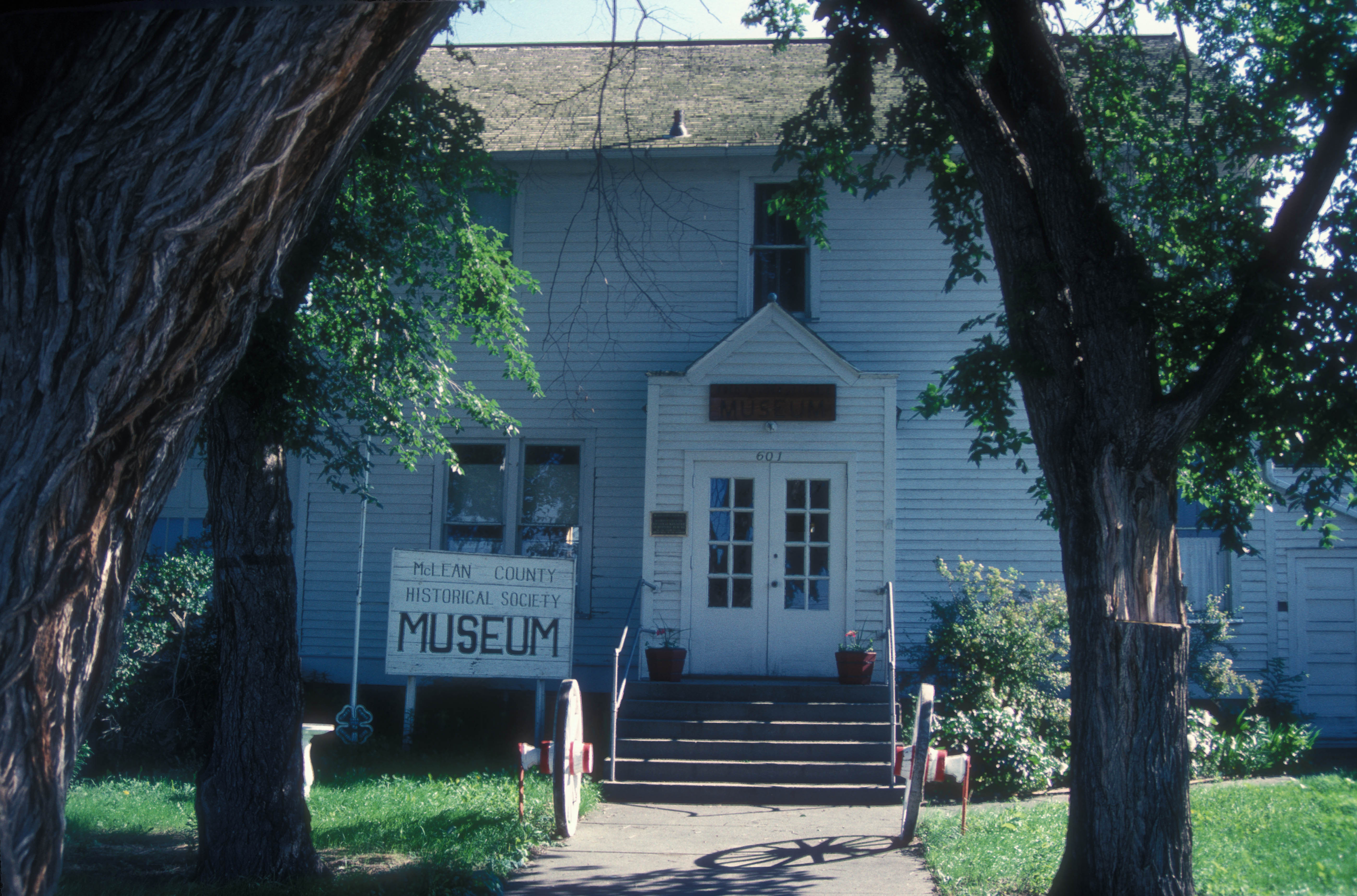
- Historic McLean County Courthouse, now Historical Museum.

- Location within the U.S. state of North Dakota
- Coordinates: 47.653206°N 101.421914°W
- Country: United States
- State: North Dakota
- Founded: March 8, 1883 (created); November 1, 1883 (organized)
- Named for: John A. McLean
- Seat: Washburn
- Largest city: Garrison

Area
  - Total: 2,327.961 sq mi (6,029.39 km^{2})
  - Land: 2,110.272 sq mi (5,465.58 km^{2})
  - Water: 217.689 sq mi (563.81 km^{2}) 9.35%

Population (2020)
  - Total: 9,771
  - Estimate (2025): 9,740 ▼
  - Density: 4.665/sq mi (1.801/km^{2})
- Time zone: UTC−6 (Central)
  - Summer (DST): UTC−5 (CDT)
- Area code: 701
- Congressional district: At-large
- Website: mcleancountynd.gov

McLean County (/məˈkleɪn/ mə-KLAYN) is a county in the U.S. state of North Dakota. As of the 2020 census, the population was 9,771, and was estimated to be 9,740 in 2025. The county seat is Washburn and the largest city is Garrison.

== History ==
The Dakota Territory legislature created the county on March 8, 1883, with areas partitioned from Burleigh, Sheridan, and (now-extinct) Stevens counties. The county was named for John A. McLean, the first mayor of Bismarck. The county organization was completed on November 1 of that year. Its boundaries were altered in 1885, in 1892, and in 1908. It has retained its current configuration since November 3, 1908, when a portion of its previous territory was partitioned to recreate Sheridan County (Sheridan had been dissolved on November 8, 1892, with its territory annexed to McLean).

== Geography ==
The county's western boundary is delineated by Lake Sakakawea, created in 1956 by construction of Garrison Dam at the county's southwestern edge. The southwestern boundary of the county is delineated by the Missouri River as it continues its southeastward flow from the lake. The county terrain consists of rolling hills, dotted with lakes and ponds in its eastern portion. The area is largely devoted to agriculture. The terrain slopes to the south and east, with its highest point on the north boundary line near its NW corner, at 2,201 ft (671 m) ASL.

According to the United States Census Bureau, the county has a total area of 2,327.961 square miles (6,029.39 km^{2}), of which 2,110.272 square miles (5,465.58 km^{2}) is land and 217.689 square miles (563.81 km^{2}) (9.35%) is water. It is the third-largest county in North Dakota by total area.

=== Major highways ===
- U.S. Highway 83
- North Dakota Highway 28
- North Dakota Highway 37
- North Dakota Highway 41
- North Dakota Highway 48
- North Dakota Highway 53
- North Dakota Highway 200
- North Dakota Highway 200A
- North Dakota Highway 1804

=== Adjacent counties ===
- Ward County - north
- McHenry County - northeast
- Sheridan County - east
- Burleigh County - southeast
- Oliver County - south
- Mercer County - southwest
- Dunn County - west
- Mountrail County - northwest

=== Protected areas ===
- Audubon National Wildlife Refuge
- Camp Lake National Wildlife Refuge
- De Trobriand State Game Management Area
- Douglas Creek Public Use Area
- Hiddenwood National Wildlife Refuge
- Lake Nettie National Wildlife Refuge
- Lake Otis National Wildlife Refuge
- Lake Susie National Wildlife Refuge
- Lost Lake National Wildlife Refuge
- McLean National Wildlife Refuge
- Riverdale State Game Management Area
- Totten Trail Park
- Wilton Mine State Game Management Area (part)

=== Lakes ===
- Blackwater Lake
- Blue Lake
- Brumwell Slough
- Camp Lake
- Cherry Lake (part)
- Cottonwood Lake
- Crooked Lake
- Lake Audubon
- Lake Brekken
- Lake Holmes
- Lake Margaret
- Lake Nettie
- Lake Ordway
- Lake Williams
- Lost Lake
- Minehan Slough
- Nelson Lake
- Otis Lake
- Painted Woods Lake
- Pelican Lake
- Peterson Lake
- Postel Lake (part)
- Strawberry Lake
- Turtle Lake
- Wildwood Lake
- Yanktonal Lake

== Demographics ==
Historical population
Census	Pop.	Note	%±
1890	860		—
1900	4,791		457.1%
1910	14,496		202.6%
1920	17,266		19.1%
1930	17,991		4.2%
1940	16,082		−10.6%
1950	18,824		17.1%
1960	14,030		−25.5%
1970	11,251		−19.8%
1980	12,383		10.1%
1990	10,457		−15.6%
2000	9,311		−11.0%
2010	8,962		−3.7%
2020	9,771		9.0%
2025 (est.)	9,740	▼	−0.3%
U.S. Decennial Census; 1790–1960 1900–1990; 1990–2000 2010–2020

As of the fourth quarter of 2024, the median home value in McLean County was $246,982.

As of the 2023 American Community Survey, there are 4,261 estimated households in McLean County with an average of 2.26 persons per household. The county has a median household income of $81,847. Approximately 9.9% of the county's population lives at or below the poverty line. McLean County has an estimated 58.8% employment rate, with 23.9% of the population holding a bachelor's degree or higher and 93.6% holding a high school diploma.

The top five reported ancestries (people were allowed to report up to two ancestries, thus the figures will generally add to more than 100%) were English (97.3%), Spanish (0.9%), Indo-European (1.0%), Asian and Pacific Islander (0.3%), and Other (0.4%).

The median age in the county was 47.4 years.

McLean County, North Dakota – racial and ethnic composition
Note: the US Census treats Hispanic/Latino as an ethnic category. This table excludes Latinos from the racial categories and assigns them to a separate category. Hispanics/Latinos may be of any race.

Race / ethnicity (NH = non-Hispanic)	Pop. 1980	Pop. 1990	Pop. 2000	Pop. 2010	Pop. 2020
White alone (NH)	11,741 (94.82%)	9,857 (94.26%)	8,592 (92.28%)	8,115 (90.55%)	8,372 (85.68%)
Black or African American alone (NH)	2 (0.02%)	3 (0.03%)	2 (0.02%)	6 (0.07%)	32 (0.33%)
Native American or Alaska Native alone (NH)	548 (4.43%)	549 (5.25%)	508 (5.46%)	585 (6.53%)	766 (7.84%)
Asian alone (NH)	13 (0.10%)	9 (0.09%)	11 (0.12%)	12 (0.13%)	48 (0.49%)
Pacific Islander alone (NH)	—	—	1 (0.01%)	2 (0.02%)	7 (0.07%)
Other race alone (NH)	14 (0.11%)	1 (0.01%)	10 (0.11%)	3 (0.03%)	17 (0.17%)
Mixed race or multiracial (NH)	—	—	106 (1.14%)	128 (1.43%)	381 (3.90%)
Hispanic or Latino (any race)	65 (0.52%)	38 (0.36%)	81 (0.87%)	111 (1.24%)	148 (1.51%)
Total	12,383 (100.00%)	10,457 (100.00%)	9,311 (100.00%)	8,962 (100.00%)	9,771 (100.00%)

=== 2024 estimate ===
As of the 2024 estimate, there were 9,845 people and 4,261 households residing in the county. There were 5,862 housing units at an average density of 2.78 per square mile (1.1/km^{2}). The racial makeup of the county was 89.3% White (88.3% NH White), 0.6% African American, 7.4% Native American, 0.6% Asian, 0.1% Pacific Islander, _% from some other races and 2.1% from two or more races. Hispanic or Latino people of any race were 2.3% of the population.

=== 2020 census ===
As of the 2020 census, the county had a population of 9,771, with 4,129 households and 2,712 families residing in the county. The population density was 4.63 inhabitants per square mile (1.8/km^{2}), and there were 5,728 housing units at an average density of 2.71 per square mile (1.0/km^{2}).

The racial makeup of the county was 86.0% White, 0.3% Black or African American, 8.3% American Indian and Alaska Native, 0.5% Asian, 0.4% from some other race, and 4.5% from two or more races. Hispanic or Latino residents of any race comprised 1.5% of the population.

Of the residents, 22.4% were under the age of 18 and 25.1% were 65 years of age or older; the median age was 46.5 years. For every 100 females there were 104.5 males, and for every 100 females age 18 and over there were 106.1 males.

There were 4,129 households in the county, of which 26.0% had children under the age of 18 living with them and 18.3% had a female householder with no spouse or partner present. About 29.6% of all households were made up of individuals and 14.2% had someone living alone who was 65 years of age or older.

Of those housing units, 27.9% were vacant. Among occupied housing units, 81.9% were owner-occupied and 18.1% were renter-occupied. The homeowner vacancy rate was 2.7% and the rental vacancy rate was 19.5%.

=== 2010 census ===
As of the 2010 census, there were 8,962 people, 3,897 households, and 2,600 families residing in the county. The population density was 4.25 inhabitants per square mile (1.6/km^{2}). There were 5,590 housing units at an average density of 2.65 per square mile (1.0/km^{2}). The racial makeup of the county was 91.03% White, 0.09% African American, 6.97% Native American, 0.13% Asian, 0.02% Pacific Islander, 0.21% from some other races and 1.54% from two or more races. Hispanic or Latino people of any race were 1.24% of the population.

In terms of ancestry, 54.4% were German, 24.6% were Norwegian, 6.5% were Irish, 5.6% were Swedish, 5.1% were English, and 3.6% were American.

Of the 3,897 households, 23.0% had children under the age of 18 living with them, 57.8% were married couples living together, 5.1% had a female householder with no husband present, 33.3% were non-families, and 29.0% of all households were made up of individuals. The average household size was 2.25 and the average family size was 2.75. The median age was 49.1 years.

The median income for a household in the county was $52,922 and the median income for a family was $62,686. Males had a median income of $48,906 versus $29,431 for females. The per capita income for the county was $27,029. About 6.5% of families and 9.3% of the population were below the poverty line, including 12.5% of those under age 18 and 13.3% of those age 65 or over.

== Communities ==
=== Cities ===
- Benedict
- Butte
- Coleharbor
- Garrison
- Max
- Mercer
- Riverdale
- Ruso
- Turtle Lake
- Underwood
- Washburn (county seat)
- Wilton (partly in Burleigh County)

=== Census-designated place ===
- White Shield

=== Unincorporated communities ===
- Falkirk
- Merida
- Raub
- Roseglen

=== Townships ===
- Amundsville
- Andrews
- Aurena
- Blackwater
- Blue Hill
- Butte
- Byersville
- Cremerville
- Deepwater
- Dogden
- Douglas
- Gate
- Greatstone
- Horseshoe Valley
- Lake Williams
- Longfellow
- Loquemont
- Malcolm
- McGinnis
- Medicine Hill
- Mercer
- Otis
- Roseglen
- Rosemont
- Saint Mary
- Snow
- Turtle Lake
- Victoria
- Wise

=== Communities flooded by Garrison Dam ===
- Beaver Creek
- Charging Eagle
- Elbowoods
- Independence
- Lucky Mound
- Nishu
- Red Butte (Mandan community)
- Shell Creek

== Politics ==
McLean County voters have voted Republican for decades. In only one national election since 1964 has the county selected the Democratic Party candidate (as of 2024).

United States presidential election results for McLean County, North Dakota
Year	Republican		Democratic		Third party(ies)	
Year	No.	%	No.	%	No.	%
1900	587	83.74%	110	15.69%	4	0.57%
1904	1,928	88.44%	219	10.05%	33	1.51%
1908	2,273	67.83%	927	27.66%	151	4.51%
1912	505	25.63%	583	29.59%	882	44.77%
1916	1,054	41.64%	1,210	47.81%	267	10.55%
1920	3,724	74.23%	748	14.91%	545	10.86%
1924	1,651	36.02%	194	4.23%	2,738	59.74%
1928	2,730	47.51%	2,855	49.69%	161	2.80%
1932	1,369	23.92%	4,354	76.08%	0	0.00%
1936	1,732	25.24%	4,018	58.55%	1,112	16.21%
1940	4,113	58.99%	2,666	38.24%	193	2.77%
1944	2,822	53.37%	2,326	43.99%	140	2.65%
1948	2,762	50.10%	2,283	41.41%	468	8.49%
1952	5,184	68.62%	2,295	30.38%	76	1.01%
1956	3,653	58.17%	2,609	41.54%	18	0.29%
1960	3,398	55.05%	2,771	44.89%	4	0.06%
1964	2,204	39.73%	3,339	60.19%	4	0.07%
1968	2,764	54.95%	2,050	40.76%	216	4.29%
1972	3,575	66.23%	1,703	31.55%	120	2.22%
1976	2,729	48.17%	2,815	49.69%	121	2.14%
1980	4,234	67.79%	1,613	25.82%	399	6.39%
1984	3,673	62.82%	2,062	35.27%	112	1.92%
1988	2,906	53.85%	2,428	45.00%	62	1.15%
1992	2,124	40.05%	1,808	34.09%	1,371	25.85%
1996	1,988	45.39%	1,759	40.16%	633	14.45%
2000	2,891	62.23%	1,465	31.53%	290	6.24%
2004	3,014	63.45%	1,664	35.03%	72	1.52%
2008	2,767	58.42%	1,867	39.42%	102	2.15%
2012	3,141	63.61%	1,670	33.82%	127	2.57%
2016	3,860	72.62%	1,081	20.34%	374	7.04%
2020	4,198	75.83%	1,230	22.22%	108	1.95%
2024	4,231	78.05%	1,093	20.16%	97	1.79%

== Education ==
School districts include:

- Drake Public School District 57
- Garrison Public School District 51
- Lewis and Clark Public School District 161
- Max Public School District 50
- Parshall Public School District 3
- Turtle Lake-Mercer Public School District 72
- Underwood Public School District 8
- Velva Public School District 1
- Washburn Public School District 4
- White Shield Public School District 85
- Wilton Public School District 1 - Formerly known as the Montefiore Public School District 1

Riverdale School District 89 had portions in McLean County and in Mercer County. The Associated Press described the district as "divided equally" between the counties. In 1993 members of the Riverdale School District school board voted to abolish their school district, with the Underwood and Hazen districts to obtain pieces of it.

== See also ==
- National Register of Historic Places listings in McLean County, North Dakota
