= Coleharbor, North Dakota =

- City
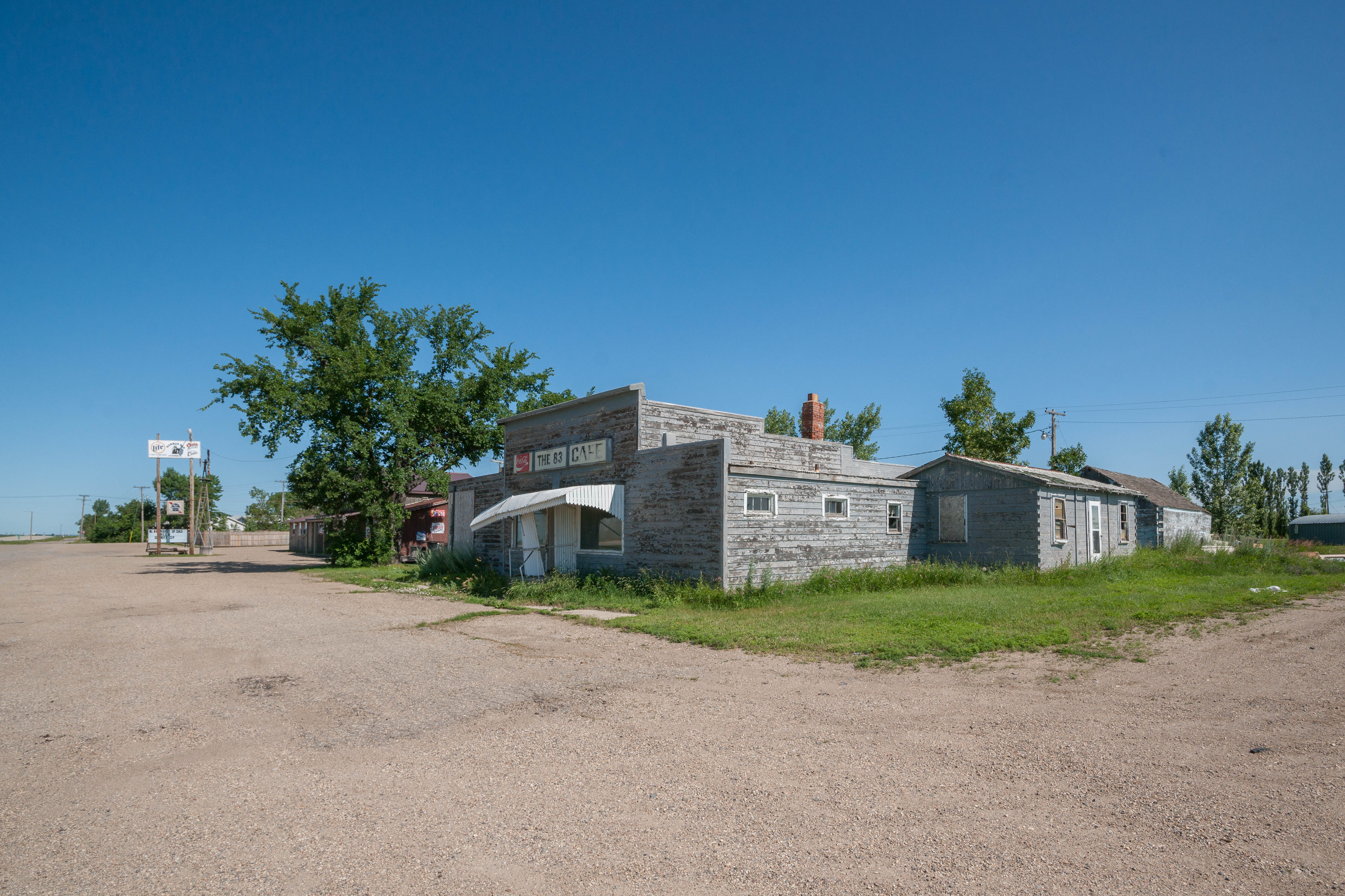
- The former 83 Cafe in Coleharbor (now gone)

- Location of Coleharbor, North Dakota
- Coordinates: 47.542533°N 101.221365°W
- Country: United States
- State: North Dakota
- County: McLean
- Founded: 1904

Area
  - Total: 0.182 sq mi (0.472 km^{2})
  - Land: 0.182 sq mi (0.472 km^{2})
  - Water: 0 sq mi (0.000 km^{2})
- Elevation: 1,900 ft (580 m)

Population (2020)
  - Total: 59
  - Estimate (2024): 62
  - Density: 323.4/sq mi (124.88/km^{2})
- Time zone: UTC–6 (Central (CST))
  - Summer (DST): UTC–5 (CDT)
- ZIP Code: 58531
- Area code: 701
- FIPS code: 38-15140
- GNIS feature ID: 1035974

Coleharbor is a city in McLean County, North Dakota, United States. The population was 59 at the 2020 census.

== History ==
Coleharbor was founded in 1904 when the railroad was extended to that point. The name combines that of a Soo Railroad official (W. A. Cole) and a reference to an older site on the Missouri River a few miles to the southwest (Coal Harbor). In July 2006, three storms converged above the town, unleashing a derecho that resulted in significant damage around town, even blowing down part of the former school building (made of brick), while leaving the nearby grain elevator intact.

== Geography ==
According to the United States Census Bureau, the city has a total area of 0.182 square miles (0.47 km^{2}), all land.

== Demographics ==
Historical population
Census	Pop.	Note	%±
1950	315		—
1960	210		−33.3%
1970	112		−46.7%
1980	150		33.9%
1990	88		−41.3%
2000	106		20.5%
2010	79		−25.5%
2020	59		−25.3%
2024 (est.)	62		5.1%
U.S. Decennial Census; 2020 Census

=== 2010 census ===
As of the 2010 census, there were 79 people, 37 households, and 22 families residing in the city. The population density was 415.8 inhabitants per square mile (160.5/km^{2}). There were 51 housing units at an average density of 268.4 per square mile (103.6/km^{2}). The racial makeup of the city was 96.2% White, 2.5% from other races, and 1.3% from two or more races. Hispanic or Latino of any race were 5.1% of the population.

There were 37 households, of which 27.0% had children under the age of 18 living with them, 51.4% were married couples living together, 8.1% had a female householder with no husband present, and 40.5% were non-families. 32.4% of all households were made up of individuals, and 8.1% had someone living alone who was 65 years of age or older. The average household size was 2.14 and the average family size was 2.77.

The median age in the city was 47.5 years. 20.3% of residents were under the age of 18; 3.8% were between the ages of 18 and 24; 20.3% were from 25 to 44; 35.4% were from 45 to 64; and 20.3% were 65 years of age or older. The gender makeup of the city was 55.7% male and 44.3% female.

=== 2000 census ===
As of the 2000 census, there were 106 people, 42 households, and 30 families residing in the city. The population density was 581.2 inhabitants per square mile (224.4/km^{2}). There were 56 housing units at an average density of 307.0 per square mile (118.5/km^{2}). The racial makeup of the city was 98.11% White, 0.94% Native American, and 0.94% from two or more races.

There were 42 households, out of which 31.0% had children under the age of 18 living with them, 64.3% were married couples living together, 9.5% had a female householder with no husband present, and 26.2% were non-families. 21.4% of all households were made up of individuals, and 9.5% had someone living alone who was 65 years of age or older. The average household size was 2.52 and the average family size was 2.94.

In the city, the population was spread out, with 25.5% under the age of 18, 7.5% from 18 to 24, 24.5% from 25 to 44, 26.4% from 45 to 64, and 16.0% who were 65 years of age or older. The median age was 43 years. For every 100 females, there were 130.4 males. For every 100 females age 18 and over, there were 113.5 males.

The median income for a household in the city was $33,750, and the median income for a family was $40,313. Males had a median income of $27,000 versus $13,750 for females. The per capita income for the city was $13,845. There were 6.9% of families and 12.1% of the population living below the poverty line, including 15.4% of under eighteens and none of those over 64.

== Climate ==
This climatic region is typified by large seasonal temperature differences, with warm to hot (and often humid) summers and cold (sometimes severely cold) winters. According to the Köppen Climate Classification system, Coleharbor has a humid continental climate, abbreviated "Dfb" on climate maps.

== Education ==
It is within the Underwood Public School District 8.
