= Turtle Lake, North Dakota =

- City
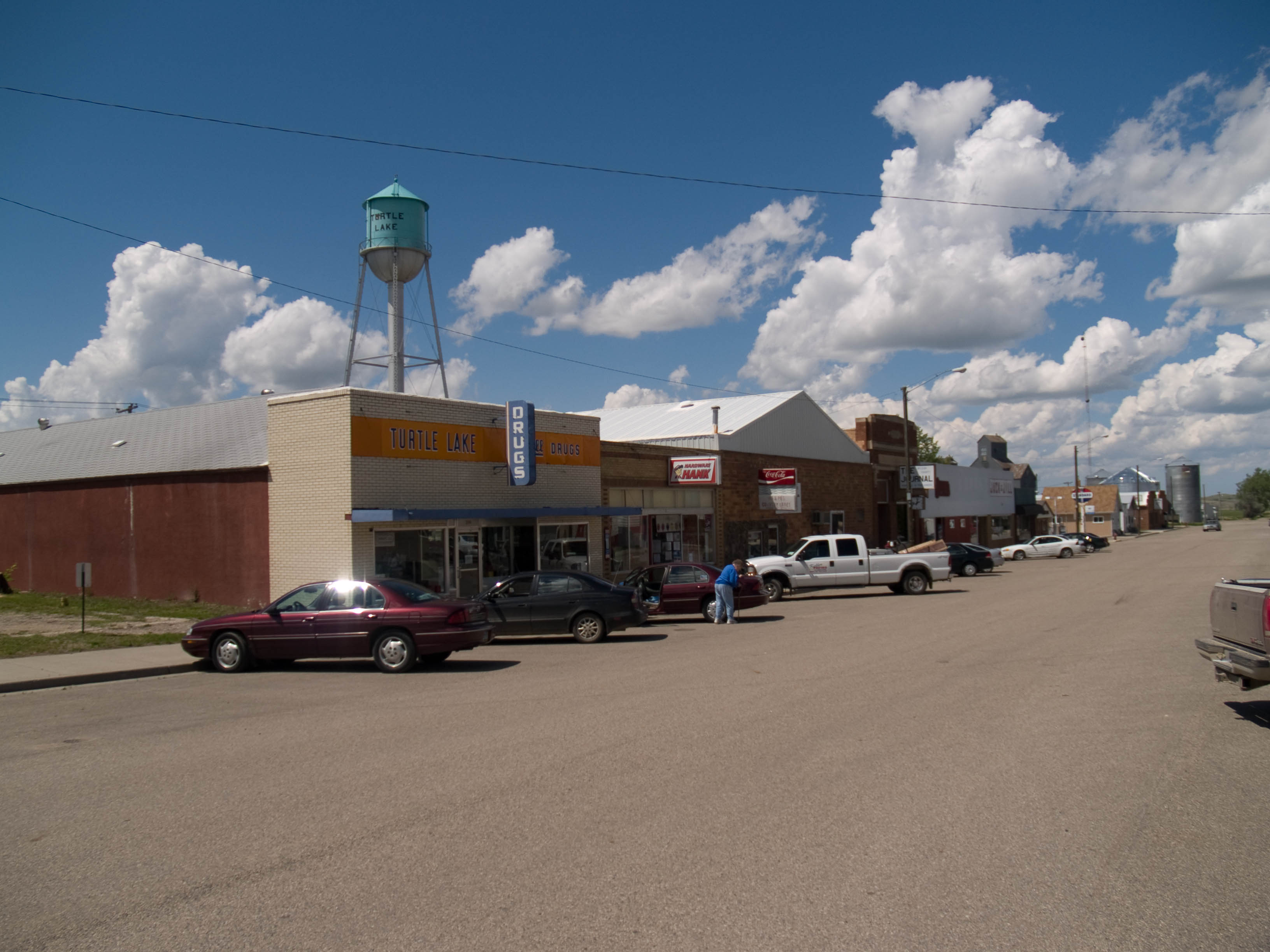
- Turtle Lake in 2008

- Location of Turtle Lake in North Dakota
- Coordinates: 47°31′18″N 100°53′27″W
- Country: United States
- State: North Dakota
- County: McLean
- Founded: 1905

Area
  - Total: 0.53 sq mi (1.37 km^{2})
  - Land: 0.51 sq mi (1.33 km^{2})
  - Water: 0.019 sq mi (0.05 km^{2})
- Elevation: 1,880 ft (573 m)

Population (2020)
  - Total: 542
  - Estimate (2022): 351
  - Density: 1,059.3/sq mi (409.01/km^{2})
- Time zone: UTC-6 (Central (CST))
  - Summer (DST): UTC-5 (CDT)
- ZIP code: 58575
- Area code: 701
- FIPS code: 38-79940
- GNIS feature ID: 1036300
- Website: turtlelakend.org

Turtle Lake is a city in McLean County, North Dakota, United States. The population was 542 at the 2020 census. Turtle Lake was founded in 1905.

A segment of the North Country National Scenic Trail is routed just to the north and east of Turtle Lake within the Brekken-Holmes Recreation Area. This trail segment can be hiked as a point-to-point hike or as a 9.2-mile loop hike from the ND Highway 41 trailhead parking area (map).

== Geography and climate ==
According to the United States Census Bureau, the city has a total area of 0.52 square miles (1.35 km^{2}), of which 0.51 square miles (1.32 km^{2}) is land and 0.01 square miles (0.03 km^{2}) is water.

Climate data for Turtle Lake, North Dakota (1991–2020 normals, extremes 1913–present)
Month	Jan	Feb	Mar	Apr	May	Jun	Jul	Aug	Sep	Oct	Nov	Dec	Year
Record high °F (°C)	57 (14)	65 (18)	80 (27)	95 (35)	98 (37)	108 (42)	115 (46)	109 (43)	106 (41)	95 (35)	78 (26)	67 (19)	115 (46)
Mean maximum °F (°C)	42.9 (6.1)	45.7 (7.6)	61.7 (16.5)	76.9 (24.9)	86.1 (30.1)	91.0 (32.8)	95.5 (35.3)	96.9 (36.1)	91.4 (33.0)	79.4 (26.3)	59.2 (15.1)	45.2 (7.3)	98.8 (37.1)
Mean daily maximum °F (°C)	20.1 (−6.6)	24.5 (−4.2)	37.4 (3.0)	53.8 (12.1)	67.0 (19.4)	76.2 (24.6)	82.7 (28.2)	82.2 (27.9)	71.9 (22.2)	55.4 (13.0)	38.1 (3.4)	24.7 (−4.1)	52.8 (11.6)
Daily mean °F (°C)	10.6 (−11.9)	14.4 (−9.8)	26.6 (−3.0)	40.7 (4.8)	53.6 (12.0)	63.7 (17.6)	69.6 (20.9)	68.0 (20.0)	58.0 (14.4)	43.5 (6.4)	28.3 (−2.1)	16.0 (−8.9)	41.1 (5.1)
Mean daily minimum °F (°C)	1.0 (−17.2)	4.3 (−15.4)	15.8 (−9.0)	27.6 (−2.4)	40.2 (4.6)	51.2 (10.7)	56.4 (13.6)	53.8 (12.1)	44.2 (6.8)	31.6 (−0.2)	18.5 (−7.5)	7.2 (−13.8)	29.3 (−1.5)
Mean minimum °F (°C)	−24.1 (−31.2)	−19.2 (−28.4)	−9.2 (−22.9)	11.1 (−11.6)	27.1 (−2.7)	39.9 (4.4)	46.7 (8.2)	43.3 (6.3)	29.9 (−1.2)	15.6 (−9.1)	−1.5 (−18.6)	−17.2 (−27.3)	−27.5 (−33.1)
Record low °F (°C)	−47 (−44)	−50 (−46)	−34 (−37)	−8 (−22)	11 (−12)	29 (−2)	34 (1)	31 (−1)	13 (−11)	−12 (−24)	−27 (−33)	−41 (−41)	−50 (−46)
Average precipitation inches (mm)	0.55 (14)	0.42 (11)	0.84 (21)	1.32 (34)	2.56 (65)	3.47 (88)	2.58 (66)	2.19 (56)	1.76 (45)	1.29 (33)	0.61 (15)	0.63 (16)	18.22 (463)
Average snowfall inches (cm)	10.5 (27)	6.5 (17)	5.7 (14)	2.3 (5.8)	0.6 (1.5)	0.0 (0.0)	0.0 (0.0)	0.0 (0.0)	0.0 (0.0)	1.7 (4.3)	8.9 (23)	7.9 (20)	44.1 (112)
Average precipitation days (≥ 0.01 in)	2.8	2.7	3.7	5.0	8.6	10.8	7.8	6.4	5.7	5.2	2.8	3.2	64.7
Average snowy days (≥ 0.1 in)	2.8	2.7	2.3	0.7	0.2	0.0	0.0	0.0	0.0	0.7	1.5	2.7	13.6
Source: NOAA

== Demographics ==
Historical population
Census	Pop.	Note	%±
1920	395		—
1930	579		46.6%
1940	632		9.2%
1950	839		32.8%
1960	792		−5.6%
1970	712		−10.1%
1980	802		12.6%
1990	681		−15.1%
2000	580		−14.8%
2010	581		0.2%
2020	542		−6.7%
2022 (est.)	538		−0.7%
U.S. Decennial Census; 2020 Census

=== 2010 census ===
As of the census of 2010, there were 581 people, 278 households, and 159 families residing in the city. The population density was 1,139.2 inhabitants per square mile (439.8/km^{2}). There were 340 housing units at an average density of 666.7 per square mile (257.4/km^{2}). The racial makeup of the city was 95.5% White, 0.3% African American, 2.1% Native American, 0.2% Asian, and 1.9% from two or more races. Hispanic or Latino of any race were 0.2% of the population.

There were 278 households, of which 19.4% had children under the age of 18 living with them, 48.2% were married couples living together, 6.5% had a female householder with no husband present, 2.5% had a male householder with no wife present, and 42.8% were non-families. 39.6% of all households were made up of individuals, and 24.1% had someone living alone who was 65 years of age or older. The average household size was 2.02 and the average family size was 2.65.

The median age in the city was 52.1 years. 17.6% of residents were under the age of 18; 5% were between the ages of 18 and 24; 18% were from 25 to 44; 28.8% were from 45 to 64; and 30.5% were 65 years of age or older. The gender makeup of the city was 49.2% male and 50.8% female.

=== 2000 census ===
As of the census of 2000, there were 580 people, 290 households, and 171 families residing in the city. The population density was 1,154.2 inhabitants per square mile (445.6/km^{2}). There were 329 housing units at an average density of 654.7 per square mile (252.8/km^{2}). The racial makeup of the city was 98.79% White, 0.86% Native American, 0.17% Asian, and 0.17% from two or more races.

There were 290 households, out of which 18.6% had children under the age of 18 living with them, 53.4% were married couples living together, 2.8% had a female householder with no husband present, and 40.7% were non-families. 38.3% of all households were made up of individuals, and 25.2% had someone living alone who was 65 years of age or older. The average household size was 1.97 and the average family size was 2.57.

In the city, the population was spread out, with 16.4% under the age of 18, 2.9% from 18 to 24, 22.4% from 25 to 44, 24.8% from 45 to 64, and 33.4% who were 65 years of age or older. The median age was 52 years. For every 100 females, there were 95.9 males. For every 100 females age 18 and over, there were 88.0 males.

The median income for a household in the city was $26,618, and the median income for a family was $36,667. Males had a median income of $32,917 versus $17,417 for females. The per capita income for the city was $16,848. About 2.3% of families and 5.3% of the population were below the poverty line, including 2.4% of those under age 18 and 7.9% of those age 65 or over.

== Education ==
It is within the Turtle Lake-Mercer Public School District 72.

== See also ==
- Wolf family murders, 1920 mass murder of a family
