= Max, North Dakota =

- City
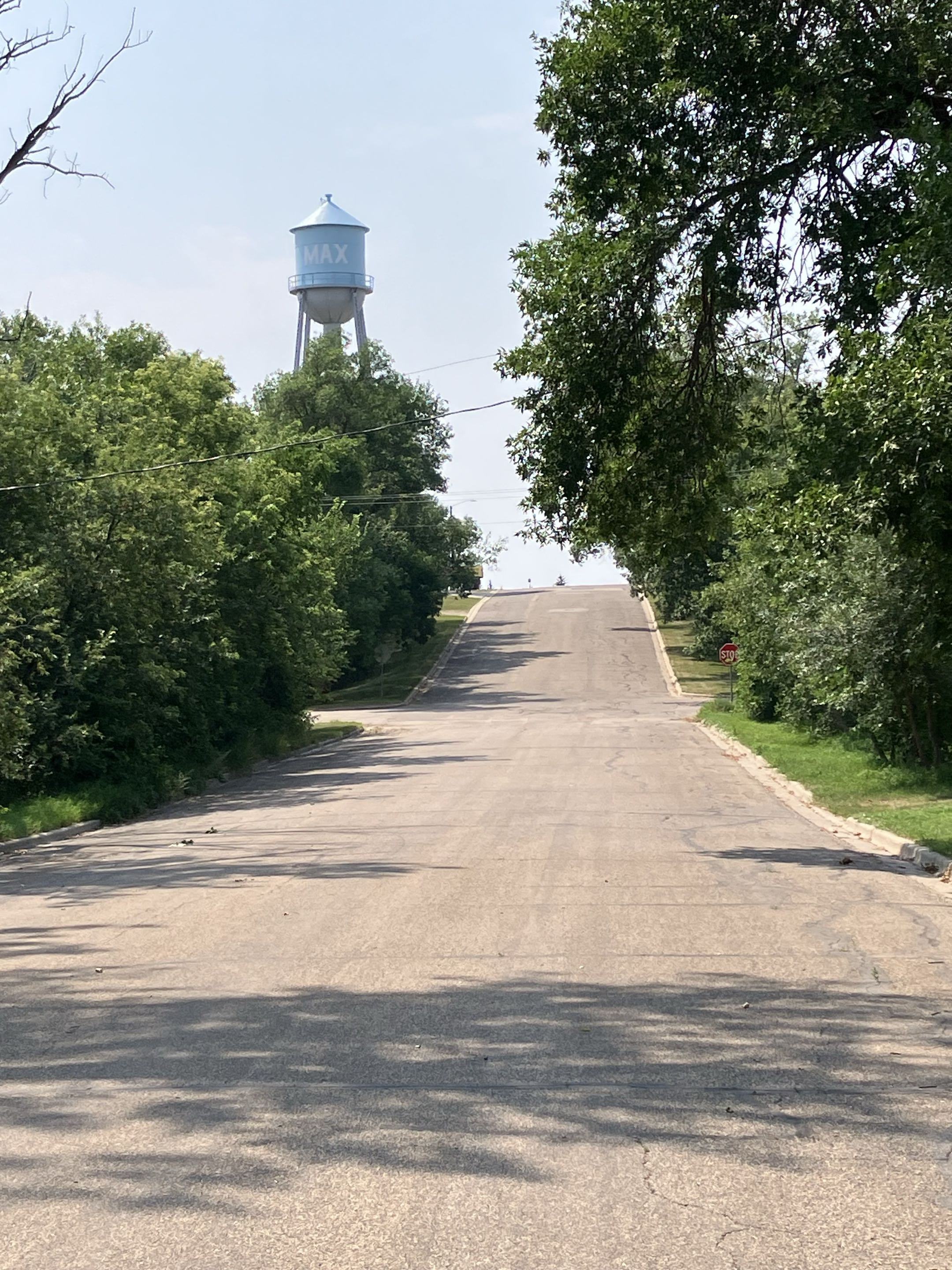

- Logo
- Motto: Live life to the Max!
- Location of Max, North Dakota
- Coordinates: 47°49′14″N 101°17′28″W
- Country: United States
- State: North Dakota
- County: McLean
- Established: 1906

Government
  - Type: City Council of Four Aldermen
  - Mayor: Robert Boedicker
  - Aldermen: Dick Gray (Council President – law enforcement); Randy Swanson (Vice President – water); Jon Hauf (streets); Chad Talbott
  - City Auditor: Tonya Balaban
  - Municipal Judge: Don Krebsbach

Area
  - Total: 0.78 sq mi (2.02 km^{2})
  - Land: 0.78 sq mi (2.02 km^{2})
  - Water: 0 sq mi (0.00 km^{2})
- Elevation: 2,106 ft (642 m)

Population (2020)
  - Total: 331
  - Estimate (2022): 328
  - Density: 424.7/sq mi (163.99/km^{2})
- Time zone: UTC-6 (Central (CST))
  - Summer (DST): UTC-5 (CDT)
- ZIP code: 58759
- Area code: 701
- FIPS code: 38-51380
- GNIS feature ID: 1036153
- Website: maxnd.com

Max is a city in McLean County, North Dakota, United States. The population was 331 at the 2020 census. Max was founded in 1906.

== History ==
Before 1906, rumors were circulating that the Soo Line would lay track close to Elbow Lake, north of Garrison, to obtain water for their steam engines. On this prospect, enterprising businessmen swiftly began staking claims in anticipation of purchasing prime real estate in a new town. A haphazard shack-building boom ensued on the surrounding ambling prairies. On August 8, 1906, a surveyor named J.G. Sheldrick filed a certificate to plat what would become the Max townsite on a grid.

The Soo Line came from the south and would have east and west branches at a junction to be named "Junction" or "Junction City". However, people started calling it Max's Post Office, after Max Freitag, eldest son of Paul Freitag. Paul Freitag was a local farmer and the first postmaster. Max asked people he met at the junction if they were coming to "his" post office to pick up their mail. The name, truncated to simply Max, stuck (in habit, if not officially). When the town was later moved two miles west to the present townsite, the name was changed officially to Max.

The Central Light and Power Company installed street lights in January 1918.

In 1947, Max decided to fully incorporate, with affairs managed by an elected mayor, and aldermanic council of four.

In the early 1950s, the town obtained a new telephone system, updated fire equipment, waterworks, water mains and a sewerage system.

== Geography ==
According to the United States Census Bureau, the city has a total area of 0.78 square miles (2.02 km^{2}), all land.

=== Climate ===
Climate data for Max, North Dakota (1991–2020 normals, extremes 1929–present)
Month	Jan	Feb	Mar	Apr	May	Jun	Jul	Aug	Sep	Oct	Nov	Dec	Year
Record high °F (°C)	56 (13)	66 (19)	78 (26)	94 (34)	104 (40)	109 (43)	110 (43)	108 (42)	106 (41)	92 (33)	74 (23)	63 (17)	110 (43)
Mean daily maximum °F (°C)	18.4 (−7.6)	22.9 (−5.1)	35.2 (1.8)	51.4 (10.8)	64.8 (18.2)	74.0 (23.3)	80.7 (27.1)	80.5 (26.9)	70.1 (21.2)	53.4 (11.9)	36.0 (2.2)	23.5 (−4.7)	50.9 (10.5)
Daily mean °F (°C)	9.3 (−12.6)	13.4 (−10.3)	25.6 (−3.6)	40.5 (4.7)	53.6 (12.0)	63.5 (17.5)	69.1 (20.6)	68.1 (20.1)	58.0 (14.4)	42.8 (6.0)	27.0 (−2.8)	14.9 (−9.5)	40.5 (4.7)
Mean daily minimum °F (°C)	0.3 (−17.6)	3.9 (−15.6)	16.1 (−8.8)	29.5 (−1.4)	42.4 (5.8)	52.9 (11.6)	57.5 (14.2)	55.6 (13.1)	45.9 (7.7)	32.2 (0.1)	18.0 (−7.8)	6.4 (−14.2)	30.1 (−1.1)
Record low °F (°C)	−39 (−39)	−47 (−44)	−34 (−37)	−10 (−23)	12 (−11)	29 (−2)	30 (−1)	29 (−2)	12 (−11)	−5 (−21)	−22 (−30)	−38 (−39)	−47 (−44)
Average precipitation inches (mm)	0.57 (14)	0.50 (13)	0.79 (20)	1.17 (30)	2.82 (72)	3.65 (93)	2.79 (71)	2.14 (54)	1.68 (43)	1.36 (35)	0.68 (17)	0.57 (14)	18.72 (475)
Average snowfall inches (cm)	8.9 (23)	7.2 (18)	7.9 (20)	4.4 (11)	1.0 (2.5)	0.0 (0.0)	0.0 (0.0)	0.0 (0.0)	0.1 (0.25)	3.4 (8.6)	6.9 (18)	9.6 (24)	49.4 (125)
Average precipitation days (≥ 0.01 in)	5.1	4.5	4.6	5.5	8.3	10.3	8.1	6.3	5.9	5.7	4.3	5.4	74.0
Average snowy days (≥ 0.1 in)	4.7	4.1	3.5	1.8	0.3	0.0	0.0	0.0	0.0	1.2	2.9	5.0	23.5
Source: NOAA

== Demographics ==
Historical population
Census	Pop.	Note	%±
1910	285		—
1920	473		66.0%
1930	500		5.7%
1940	423		−15.4%
1950	465		9.9%
1960	410		−11.8%
1970	301		−26.6%
1980	330		9.6%
1990	301		−8.8%
2000	278		−7.6%
2010	334		20.1%
2020	331		−0.9%
2022 (est.)	328		−0.9%
U.S. Decennial Census; 2020 Census

=== 2010 census ===
As of the census of 2010, there were 334 people, 141 households, and 90 families residing in the city. The population density was 428.2 inhabitants per square mile (165.3/km^{2}). There were 164 housing units at an average density of 210.3 per square mile (81.2/km^{2}). The racial makeup of the city was 94.3% White, 2.7% Native American, and 3.0% from two or more races. Hispanic or Latino of any race were 0.3% of the population.

There were 141 households, of which 29.1% had children under the age of 18 living with them, 53.2% were married couples living together, 5.7% had a female householder with no husband present, 5.0% had a male householder with no wife present, and 36.2% were non-families. 30.5% of all households were made up of individuals, and 12.7% had someone living alone who was 65 years of age or older. The average household size was 2.37 and the average family size was 2.89.

The median age in the city was 37.7 years. 24.6% of residents were under the age of 18; 8.7% were between the ages of 18 and 24; 25.5% were from 25 to 44; 27.6% were from 45 to 64; and 13.8% were 65 years of age or older. The gender makeup of the city was 50.6% male and 49.4% female.

=== 2000 census ===
As of the census of 2000, there were 278 people, 129 households, and 74 families residing in the city. The population density was 362.3 inhabitants per square mile (139.9/km^{2}). There were 150 housing units at an average density of 195.5 per square mile (75.5/km^{2}). The racial makeup of the city was 95.68% White, 1.44% Native American, 1.44% Asian, and 1.44% from two or more races.

There were 129 households, out of which 28.7% had children under the age of 18 living with them, 48.8% were married couples living together, 7.8% had a female householder with no husband present, and 42.6% were non-families. 40.3% of all households were made up of individuals, and 27.9% had someone living alone who was 65 years of age or older. The average household size was 2.16 and the average family size was 2.92.

In the city, the population was spread out, with 25.9% under the age of 18, 5.8% from 18 to 24, 21.9% from 25 to 44, 25.2% from 45 to 64, and 21.2% who were 65 years of age or older. The median age was 42 years. For every 100 females, there were 87.8 males. For every 100 females age 18 and over, there were 80.7 males.

The median income for a household in the city was $27,321, and the median income for a family was $31,375. Males had a median income of $26,250 versus $16,563 for females. The per capita income for the city was $13,640. About 10.8% of families and 17.9% of the population were below the poverty line, including 28.8% of those under the age of 18 and 21.0% of those 65 or over.

== Local politics ==
Jodi Gullickson, the mayor of Max preceding current mayor Richard Seklecki, faced an unsuccessful effort to recall her in a special election held in April 2007. The recall election followed several resignations in Max's government in late 2006.

== Education ==
It is within the Max Public School District 50.
