= Easement refuge =

Type of American national wildlife refuge

An easement refuge is a special type of National Wildlife Refuge under the auspices of the United States Fish and Wildlife Service (FWS). Such refuges exist on privately owned land, with the law of easements guaranteeing their status.

On an easement refuge, the Refuge boundaries encompass private land and the Fish and Wildlife Service does not own the land. Instead, through the use of a conservation easement, the FWS maintains the water rights and the right to restrict "hunting, trapping and willful disturbance of any bird or wild animal of any kind whatsoever within the limits of the refuge or to enter thereon..." However, the private landowner reserves the right to hay, graze, burn and manage the land with only minimal intervention from the Service.
