= Great Texas Coastal Birding Trail =

Birdwatching trail system in Texas, U.S.

Coordinates: 29°N 96°W

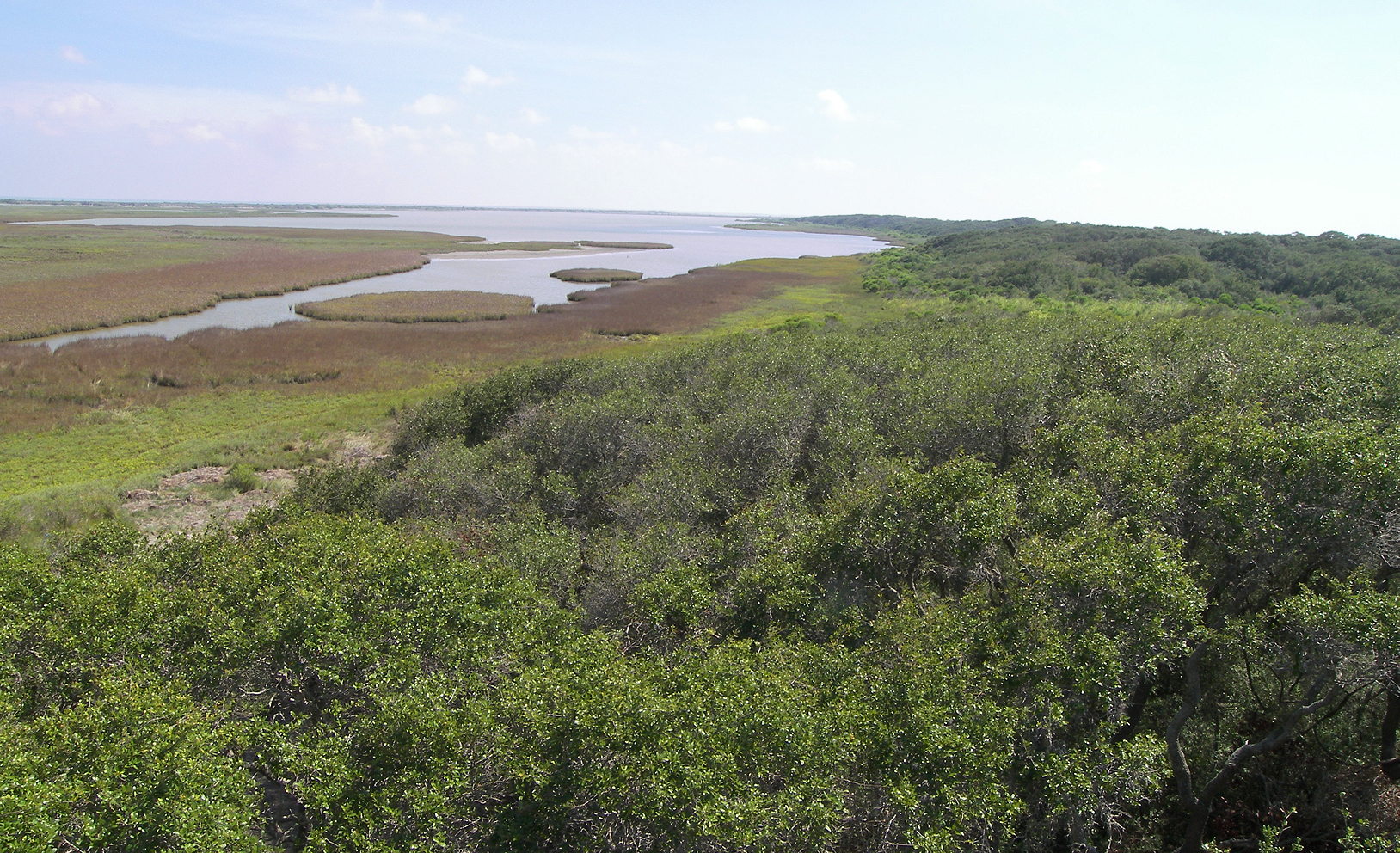
- Wetlands at Aransas National Wildlife Refuge looking out from the 40-foot (12 m) observation tower.
- Length: Over 500 mi (800 km) from end-to-end 2,100 mi (3,400 km) combined trails
- Location: Texas Gulf Coast
- Use: Bird watching / hiking
- Sights: Gulf of Mexico, numerous bays and forests

The Great Texas Coastal Birding Trail is a state-designated system of trails, bird sanctuaries, and nature preserves along the entire length of the Texas Gulf Coast in the United States. As the state of Texas hosts more bird species than any other state in the U.S. the trail system offers some of the most unusual opportunities for bird-watching in the world. The "trail" is actually 43 separate hiking and driving trails that include 308 birding sites. The sites themselves feature a variety of viewing opportunities with boardwalks, observation decks, and other amenities. The trails boast more than 450 bird species. The trail system is managed by the Texas Parks and Wildlife Department as part of the Great Texas Wildlife Trails which also include the Heart of Texas Wildlife Trail, the Panhandle Plains Wildlife Trail, and the Prairies and Pineywoods Wildlife Trail.

Apart from bird watching the trail system includes many nature preserves which feature a wide variety of wildlife. In addition, the various sites cover many types of natural terrain and flora including forests, marshes, and beaches.

This trail network was the first of its kind in the U.S. though many states have since followed. The trail system remains the nation's largest. One of the most well-known locations along the trail system is the Aransas National Wildlife Refuge, which holds the winter home of the only natural flock of whooping cranes in the world.

== Trail system ==
Apart from bird watching the trail system includes many nature preserves which feature a wide variety of wildlife. In addition the various sites cover many types of natural terrain and flora including forests, marshes, and beaches.

The trail system is the nation's largest. One of the most well-known locations along the trail system is the Aransas National Wildlife Refuge, which holds the winter home of the only natural flock of whooping cranes in the world.

== History ==
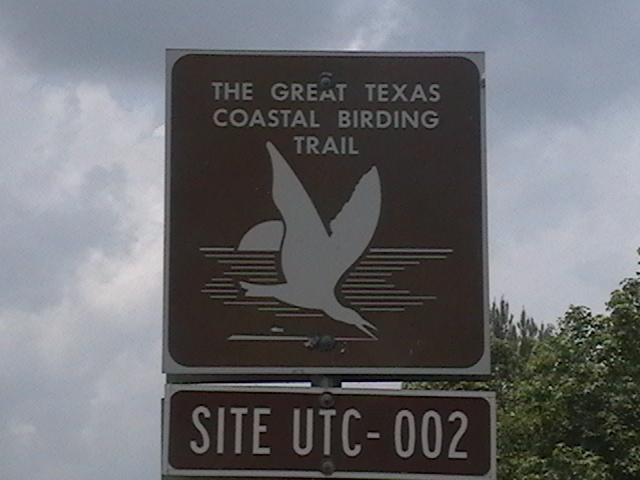
A road sign for the trail system in Newton County

The Texas coast has been popular among bird watchers in the United States for decades. Located where the Central Flyway meets the Gulf Coast and the Mississippi Flyway, the region sees a large number of migrants; in addition, the southern part of the Texas coast is far enough south to host a number of tropical species. A 1991 American Birding Association (ABA) study by Roland Wauer showed that Texas was the top bird-watching destination in the United States for its members. In 1993 the Texas Parks and Wildlife Department began a $1.5 million project to develop public and private resources to utilize as bird sanctuaries and observation sites. The plan and the concept were largely developed by Ted Eubanks and Madge Lindsay. Site improvements included trail markers, trail development, boardwalks, observation stations, and many others. The goal was both to encourage environmental protection and to establish a tourism network that would benefit businesses throughout the Texas Gulf Coast region catering to ecotourists.

The Central Coast section of the trail network was opened in 1994 with more than 95 sites. The other sections opened soon afterward. The trail system was completed in 2000. Markers featuring a logo with a black skimmer are present on each of the viewing sites. Soon other wildlife trail networks were developed in other parts of Texas, and other states established their own wildlife trail systems patterned after the Texas model.

Sites along the trail systems are popular among birding enthusiasts, both domestic and international. Events such as the state's Great Texas Birding Classic continue to build interest in the trails among nature lovers.

== Geography ==
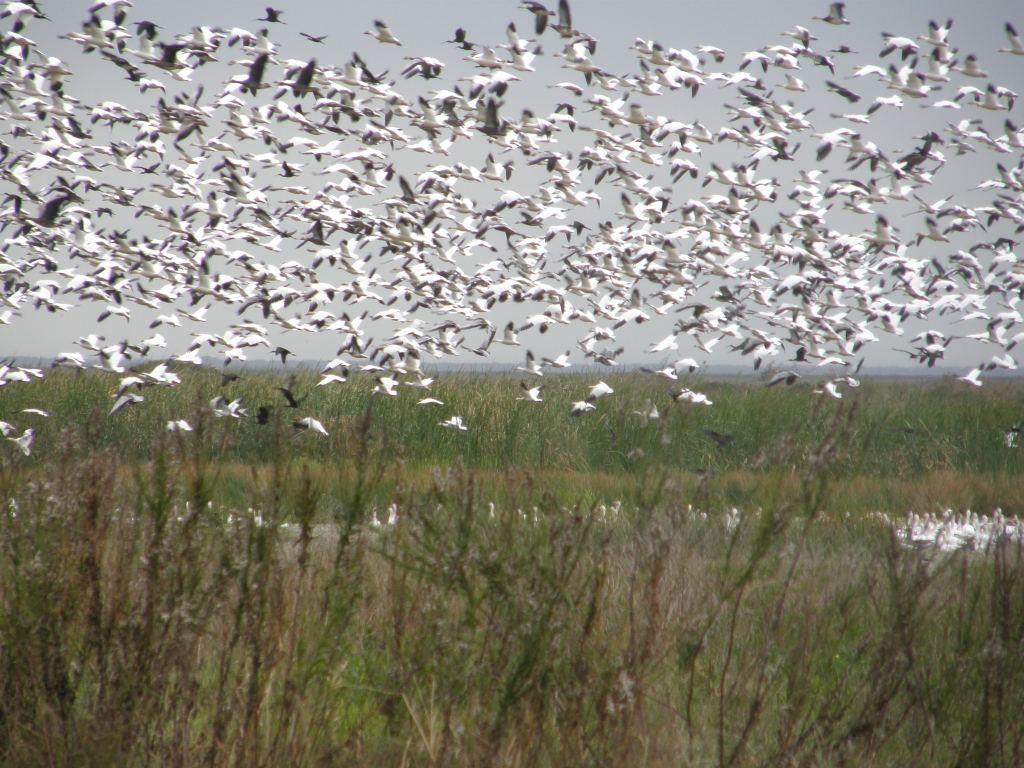
Snow geese over the wetlands of Jocelyn Nungaray National Wildlife Refuge

The region covered by the trail network is part of the Gulf Coastal Plains. With annual rainfall averages ranging from about 20 to 58 inches (510 to 1,470 mm), this is a nearly level, drained plain dissected by streams and rivers flowing into estuaries and marshes. Windblown sands and dunes, grasslands, oak mottes, and salt marshes make up the seaward areas.

The region stretches from the Piney Woods of East Texas to the Texas Coastal Prairies that dominate the majority of the coast south of Houston. The Piney Woods area features groves of pine and other hardwood trees such as oak, magnolia, and American Sweet Gum (Liquidambar styraciflua). This wooded area which has supported Texas' lumber industry since the 19th century is now considered one of the most critically endangered ecosystems in the world. These woodland areas of the trail network stretch from the Big Thicket area in the east to Sam Houston National Forest in the west, with pockets of woodlands stretching down into the area around Galveston Bay near Houston.

The prairie regions feature a variety of grass types, particularly Indiangrass (Sorghastrum nutans), big bluestem (Andropogon gerardii), little bluestem (Schizachyrium scoparium), and switchgrass (Panicum virgatum). The grasslands around the Laguna Madre near Corpus Christi are considered some of the most important.

Parts of extreme South Texas around Brownsville and the Rio Grande feature forests of sabal palm (Sabal mexicana) and Texas ebony (Ebenopsis ebano). These forests, once widespread in the region, were mostly cleared during the 1900s though some clusters, particularly the Sabal Palm Audubon Center and Sanctuary, remain. The areas around Zapata and Laredo, which though significantly inland are considered part of the "coastal" trail system, feature a semi-arid climate as they lie near the eastern edge of the Chihuahuan Desert. Scrub vegetation dominates the area with the Rio Grande and lakes supporting substantial wildlife diversity.

The coastline features numerous bays and lakes including Sabine Lake, Galveston Bay, Matagorda Bay, San Antonio Bay, Copano Bay, Corpus Christi Bay, Baffin Bay, and the Laguna Madre.

== Wildlife ==
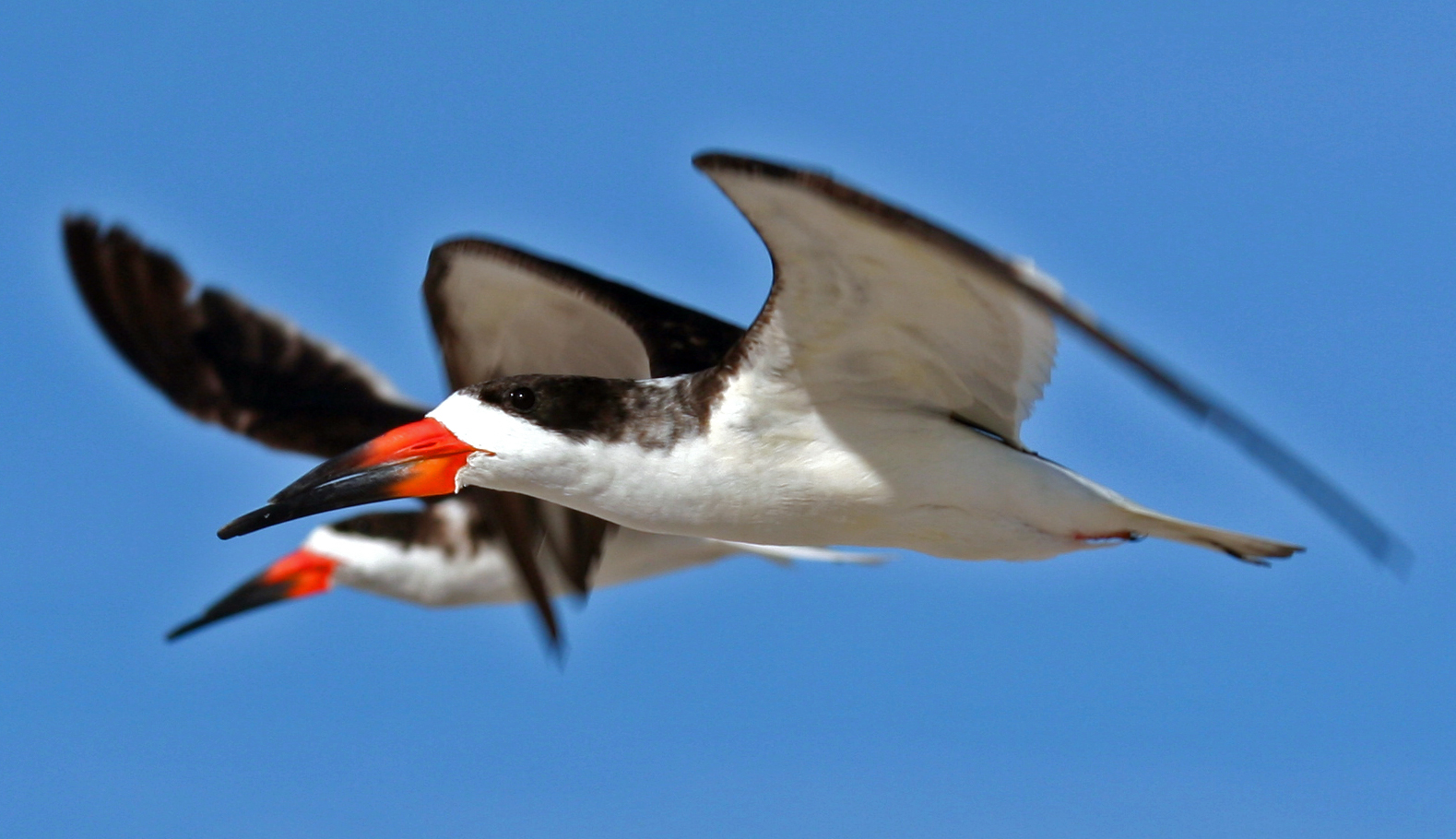
Black skimmer

Typical varieties of birds along the length of the system include duck, geese, and seagull with many other species found in particular locations. The endangered whooping crane that winter in Aransas National Wildlife Refuge are among the most famous. The black skimmer, adopted as a symbol of the trail system, can be found throughout almost the entire coastline.

Apart from the many varieties of bird species, many other types of animals can be found along the trails. American alligator, bobcat, coyote, and nutria are common in areas of the Upper Coast. Collared peccary, the Texas spiny lizard, and the Texas indigo snake can be found further south. In the Central Coast, the northern cottonmouth (Agkistrodon piscivorus) snake is prominent, not to mention dolphin and other marine mammals along the Gulf. Mexican long-nosed armadillo and white-tailed deer can be seen throughout. The Rio Grande Valley is particularly known for the many varieties of butterflies that inhabit the area (celebrated by the annual Texas Butterfly Festival in Mission). Resident species include the Julia, zebra, Mexican bluewing, and white peacock.

== Sections ==
- The Great Texas Wildlife Trail is divided into three major sections: the Upper Coast, Central Coast, and Lower Coast regions.

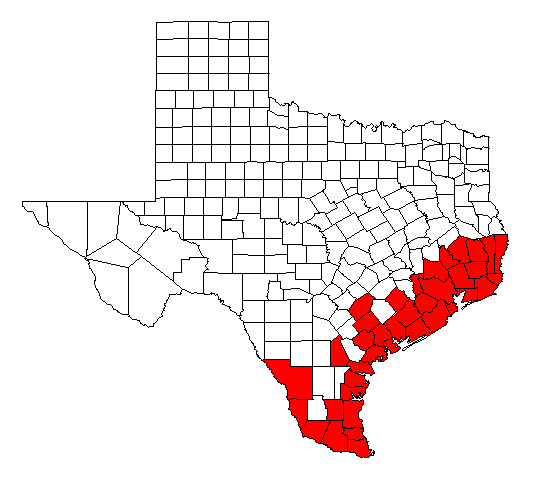
Counties containing sites in the trail system

Within each section, there are 43 "loops", hiking and driving trails containing specific birding sites ranging from parks and observatories to nature preserves and wildlife refuges. Individual sites may contain any number of individual hiking trails through a wide variety of terrain. Some venues are particularly well known for specific viewing opportunities. The Bolivar Flats area is especially well known for its abundance of shorebirds. The wetlands of Brazoria National Wildlife Refuge are known for the multitude of waterfowl. High Island is known for its nesting colonies of spoonbills and herons. The Attwater Prairie Chicken National Wildlife Refuge is a major preserve created for the protection of the endangered Attwater's prairie chicken. The loops of the Lower Coast feature a variety of snowbirds from Canada and the northern U.S. which winter in the region.

Along the coast near Port Arthur one can find pelicans, cormorants, horned grebes, orioles, Cape May warblers, and laughing gulls. The area around Galveston Bay and Houston is home to Henslow's sparrows, roseate spoonbills, white-faced ibises, marsh wrens, seaside sparrows, snow geese, yellow and black rails, and northern harriers. The Smith Point peninsula contains a 20-foot observation tower offering views of broad-winged hawks and other hawk species. Closer to the coast seagulls, peregrine falcons, and seaside sparrows may be visible.

=== Upper Coast ===
The Upper Texas Coast Wildlife Trail (UTC), also referred to as the Big Thicket Loop, spans the Port Arthur and Big Thicket areas, the Galveston Bay and Houston areas, and the Brazosport areas.

The Piney Woods area of the Upper Coast section is home to species such as red-cockaded woodpeckers, bald eagles, Bachman's sparrows, the great crested flycatcher, the pine warbler, the red-shouldered hawk, and the barred owl among many others.

There are 19 sites listed by the UTC designation number.

UTC sites

| UTC site # | Name | Description and viewing | Location |
|---|---|---|---|
| 001 | Tony Houseman Wildlife Management Area (WMA) | View; extensive boardwalk system that allows access to Blue Elbow Swamp and the surrounding bottomland forest. | This state park begins at the Texas line on I-10 at the Sabine River. |
| 002 | Bon Wier | This site is a wildlife management and recreation area privately owned by Louisiana-Pacific Corporation (LPC) and entry is by reservation. View; brown-headed nuthatch and Bachman's sparrow | At the Sabine River (Texas-Louisiana) near Bon Wier |
| 003 | Wild Azalea Canyons | Wild Azalea Canyons and Temple-Inland Wilderness Park. View; azaleas blooming from mid- to late March. | From Newton, Tx hwy 87 north to FM 1414 to park |
| 004 | Toledo Bend Reservoir | View; many species of birds including some waterfowl | North of Burkeville on FM 692 |
| 005 | Champion Canyon Rim Woodlands Trail | View; blue-gray gnatcatchers, red-eyed vireo, yellow-throated vireos, and black-and-white warblers | From Burkeville take Texas State Highway 87, through Mayflower. |
| 006 | Sam Rayburn Reservoir | U.S. Army Corps of Engineers (ACOE) operates a number of recreational sites along the south shore of the lake, including Twin Dikes Park, Overlook Park, Ebenezer Park, and the Sandy Creek Recreation Area. View; flocks of waterfowl in migration and winter, as well as a scattering of loons, grebes, gulls, and terns | From Jasper U.S. Route 96 north R255 west to reservoir |
| 007 | Angelina NF Boykin Springs Recreation Area | View; Henslow's sparrows in winter. Brown-headed nuthatches throughout the year, Kentucky warblers, yellow-breasted chats, painted buntings, and chipping sparrows. There are also a number of red-cockaded woodpeckers | From Jasper, Texas State Highway 63 to FR 313 to NF. |
| 008 | Angelina National Forest Upland Island Wilderness, Bouton Lake, and Sawmill Trail | View; Louisiana waterthrush | From Jasper, Tx hwy 63, northwest towards Zavalla to Angelina CR 348. Travel south on CR 348 (also FR 303) to the wilderness area |
| 009 | Champion Woodland Trail | View; longleaf pines estimated to be in excess of 250 years old and a variety of woodland birds | West on FM 1745 from Colmesneil to US 287, then north on US 287 to FM 62. |
| 010 | LPC Dogwood Trail | 'View;' dogwoods bloom from mid-to-late March. | From Woodville travel east on US 190 to LPC Dogwood Trail |
| 011 | Jasper State Fish Hatchery | View; eastern bluebirds and assorted waterfowl | Near Jasper |
| 012 | East B.A. Steinhagen Reservoir | View; opportunities for woodland birding | From Jasper, US 190 west to FM 777 south to CR 155 west. |
| 013 | Martin Dies State Park | Three units; The Hen House Ridge, Walnut Ridge, and Cherokee units View; heron and egret nesting colonies in and around this reservoir, anhingas, and various woodpeckers | From Jasper, US 190 west to PR 48. Park headquarters, park is on the north and south side of US 190. |
| 014 | West B.A. Steinhagen Reservoir | View; yellow-throated warblers and indigo buntings | From Jasper, US 190 west to reservoir |
| 015 | Big Thicket National Preserve | View; many different types of birds at Cook's Lake, Hickory Creek Savannah, Kirby Nature Trail, Lance Rosier Unit, McQueen's Landing, Pitcher Plant Trail, Turkey Creek Trail, and Village Creek | From Kountze, US 69 to BTNP |
| 016 | Gore Store Road and Turkey Creek | View; red-cockaded woodpecker and Bachman's sparrow (quite difficult to find), prairie warbler and Swainson's warblers, yellow-breasted chat, and indigo and painted buntings. Camp Waluta Road (0.2 mile) is often worth a try to view eastern towhees. Also FM 418 to FM 92 in late spring through early summer, there are eastern screech owls, barred owls, and chuck-will's-widows. These are nocturnal and almost impossible to view without equipment. | From Kountze, U.S. Route 69 /U.S. Route 287 north through Village Mills to Gore Store Road east. |
| 017 | TNCT Roy E. Larson Sandyland Sanctuary | View; eastern woodland birds, as well as experience the arid pine sandhills | From Silsbee, west on FM 327 to The Nature Conservancy of Texas. |
| 018 | Village Creek State Park | View; eastern woodland birds | From Beaumont, U.S. Route 96 north to park |
| 019 | Tyrrell Park and Cattail Marsh | View; fish crow | From Beaumont, I-10 west to Walden road south (becomes Tyrrell Park Road) to park. |

=== Central Coast ===
The Central section spans the Matagorda Bay and Victoria areas down to the Port Aransas and Corpus Christi areas.

The Central Coast section offers many bird species of its own. The Matagorda Bay area contains American oystercatchers, Hudsonian godwits, and white-rumped sandpipers. The Corpus Christi area features groove-billed anis, olive sparrows, long-billed thrashers, Couch's kingbirds, black skimmers, and black-crowned night herons.

=== Lower Coast ===
The Lower section spans the South Padre Island and Brownsville areas up the Rio Grande to Laredo.

The Lower Coast section which lies around the Rio Grande offers its own species diversity. South Padre Island and the Laguna Madre areas feature magnificent frigatebirds, bridled terns, and Cory's shearwater. Further up the Rio Grande around Santa Ana and McAllen one can find elf owls, white-tipped doves, green jays, green kingfishers, and Mississippi kite. The brown pelican is found especially on South Padre Island in addition to other locations on the coast. The inland areas around Zapata are home to Morelet's seedeaters, lesser goldfinch, ash-throated flycatchers, and black-tailed gnatcatchers.

== Nature preserves ==
The Aransas National Wildlife Refuge is the largest of the national refuges in Texas. The Big Thicket National Preserve features the largest number of wetlands boardwalks in the state (75).

Other major nature preserves along the trail system include Jocelyn Nungaray National Wildlife Refuge, Attwater Prairie Chicken National Wildlife Refuge, Big Boggy National Wildlife Refuge, Brazoria National Wildlife Refuge, Laguna Atascosa National Wildlife Refuge, and Texas Point National Wildlife Refuge.

== Ecotourism ==
The trail systems lie in and around numerous communities along the coast, many of which specifically cater to ecotourists. Annual nature festivals are held in Rockport, Port Aransas, McAllen, Galveston, Harlingen, and Mission attracting large numbers of visitors each year. The system includes numerous important urban nature centers including the Armand Bayou Nature Center, Baytown Nature Center, Beaumont Botanical Gardens and Cattail Marsh located in Tyrrell Park, the Corpus Christi Botanical Gardens and Nature Center, the South Padre Island Birding and Nature Center, and the Texas City Prairie Preserve.

== See also ==
- Creole Nature Trail
- Great Florida Birding Trail
- National Scenic Byway
- State wildlife trails (United States)
- World Birding Center
