= List of Texas state wildlife trails =

The State of Texas (United States) has designated numerous trail systems and nature preserves as part of the "Great Texas Wildlife Trails." These are broken into four major trail systems.

- Great Texas Coastal Birding Trail (Gulf Coast)

- Seabrook Trail System

- Heart of Texas Wildlife Trail (Central Texas)
- Panhandle Plains Wildlife Trail (Panhandle)
- Prairies and Pineywoods Wildlife Trail (East Texas / North Texas)

== See also ==
- List of Texas state forests
