= Sea Rim State Park =

State park in Texas, United States

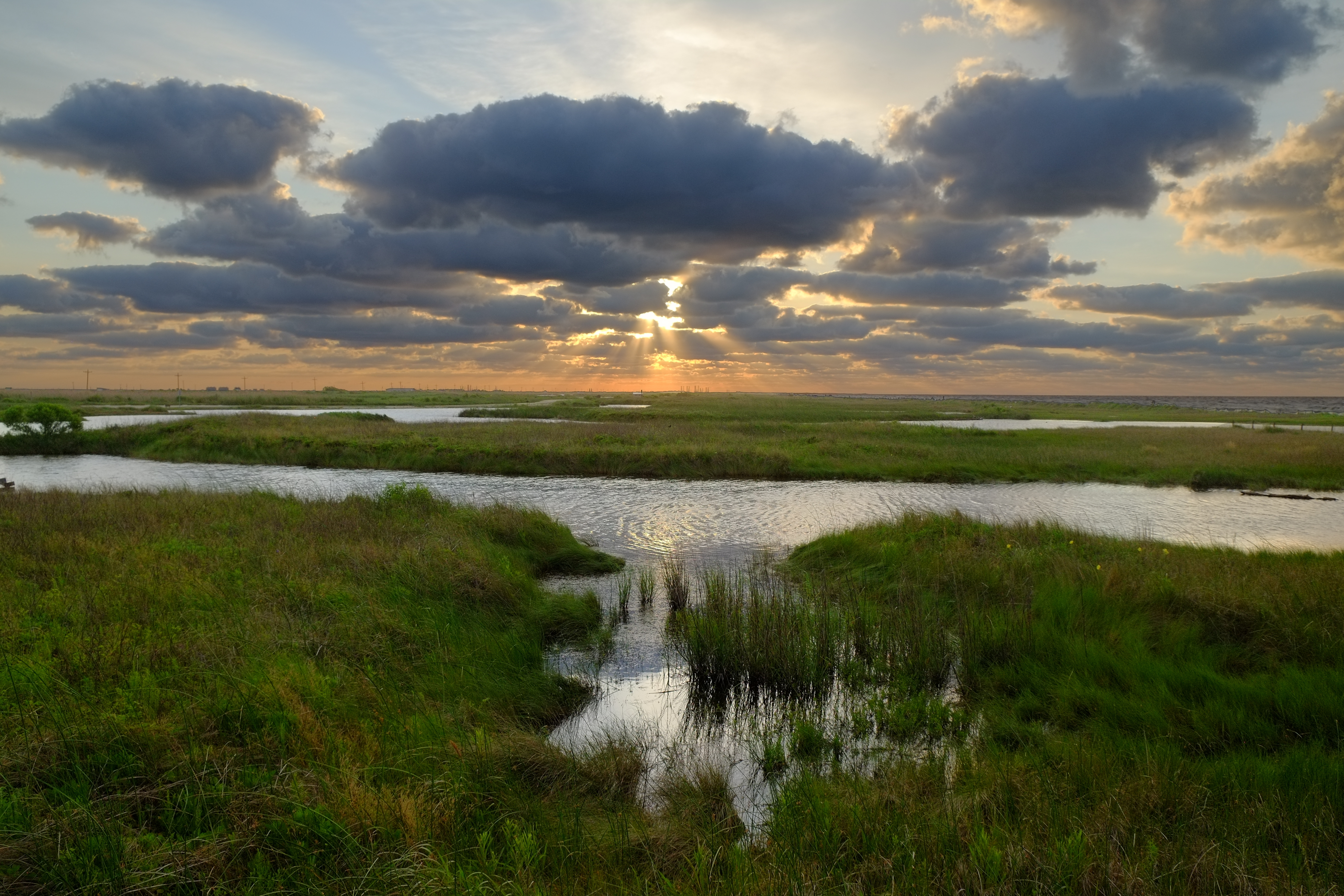
- Sea Rim State Park, May 2016

- Location within Texas Location within the United States
- Location: Jefferson County, Texas
- Nearest city: Port Arthur
- Coordinates: 29.69939°N 94.02545°W
- Area: 4,141 acres (1,676 ha)
- Created: 1972-1977
- Operator: Texas Parks and Wildlife Department
- Visitors: 53,373 (in 2022)
- Website: Sea Rim State Park

Sea Rim State Park is a 4,141-acre (1,676 ha) state park in southeast Texas. The park is located on the Gulf of Mexico in southern Jefferson County, south of Port Arthur and just west of Sabine Pass. The park was closed for several years due to extensive damage from Hurricanes Rita (2005) and Ike (2008). The park reopened in 2010.

== Description ==
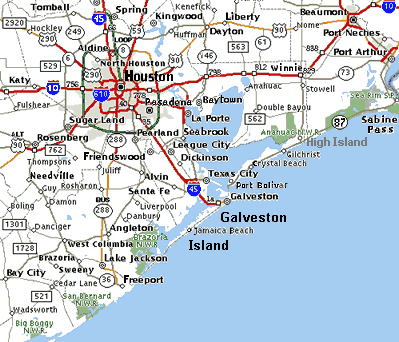
Sea Rim State Park (upper right), south of Port Arthur, along the Gulf coast of Southeast Texas

The Beach unit is the coastal portion of the park, offering beach access between the Gulf of Mexico and the mainland marshes. Swimming in the marshes is not recommended due to the presence of alligators.

The Marsh unit is located in the inland marshes of southern Jefferson County. It holds the park’s only cabin as well as the boat launch for the boat trails. The park does not rent canoes and kayaks so that these areas of the park may be explored by visitors.

Many species of migratory birds stop in or pass through the park. Ideal places to view them include the Gambusia Nature Trail, Willow Pond boardwalk, and wildlife viewing platform located in Fence Lake accessible by boat.

The park loans out fishing equipment, crabbing equipment, junior ranger backpacks, and binoculars at the headquarters building for free.

McFaddin National Wildlife Refuge borders the park.

Three nearby national wildlife refuges on the Texas coast - Brazoria N.W.R., San Bernard and Big Boggy - form a vital complex of coastal wetlands harboring more than 300 bird species.

== History ==
The park land was purchased from the Planet Oil and Mineral Corporation and Horizon Sales Corporation in 1972, and opened in 1977.

The portion of Texas State Highway 87 extending through Sea Rim to High Island is closed, having been destroyed in 1989 by Hurricane Jerry. Previous storms had eroded the beach, leaving the highway vulnerable to storm-generated surf.

In September 2005, Hurricane Rita did extensive damage to Sea Rim State Park, forcing its closure. Hurricane Ike caused further damage in 2008. In April 2010, the park re-opened to limited daytime use. By June 2014, TPWD had restored services at the park. The park provides water and electric service to campsites located off of the beach. Visitors have an option to camp on the beach in primitive campsites. More detailed information is available on the Texas Parks and Wildlife Division website.

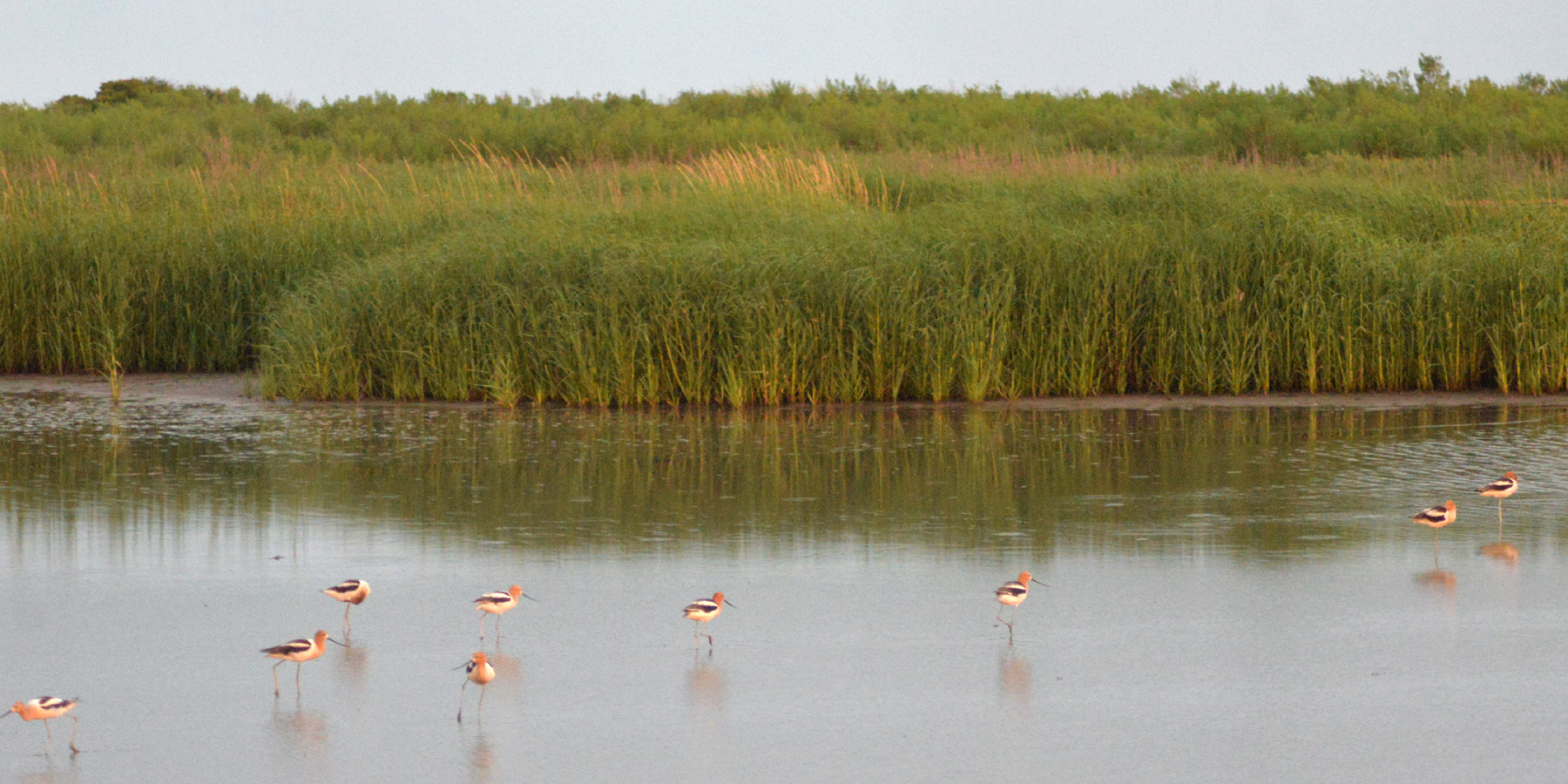
American Avocet (Recurvirostra americana) on the mud flats at Sea Rim State Park.

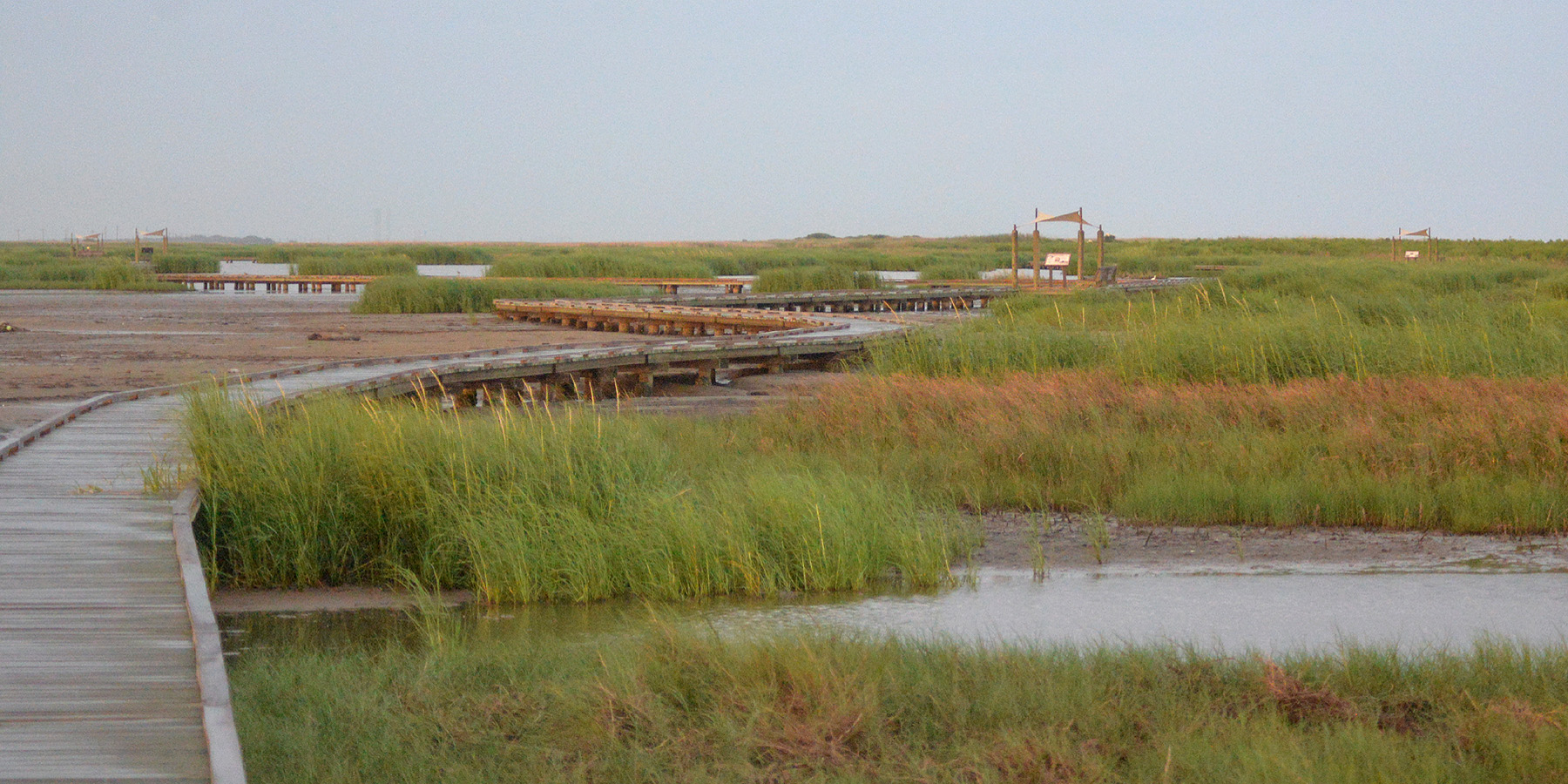
Gambusia Nature Trail Boardwalk, a 0.9 mile boardwalk through tidal mud flats and marshes.

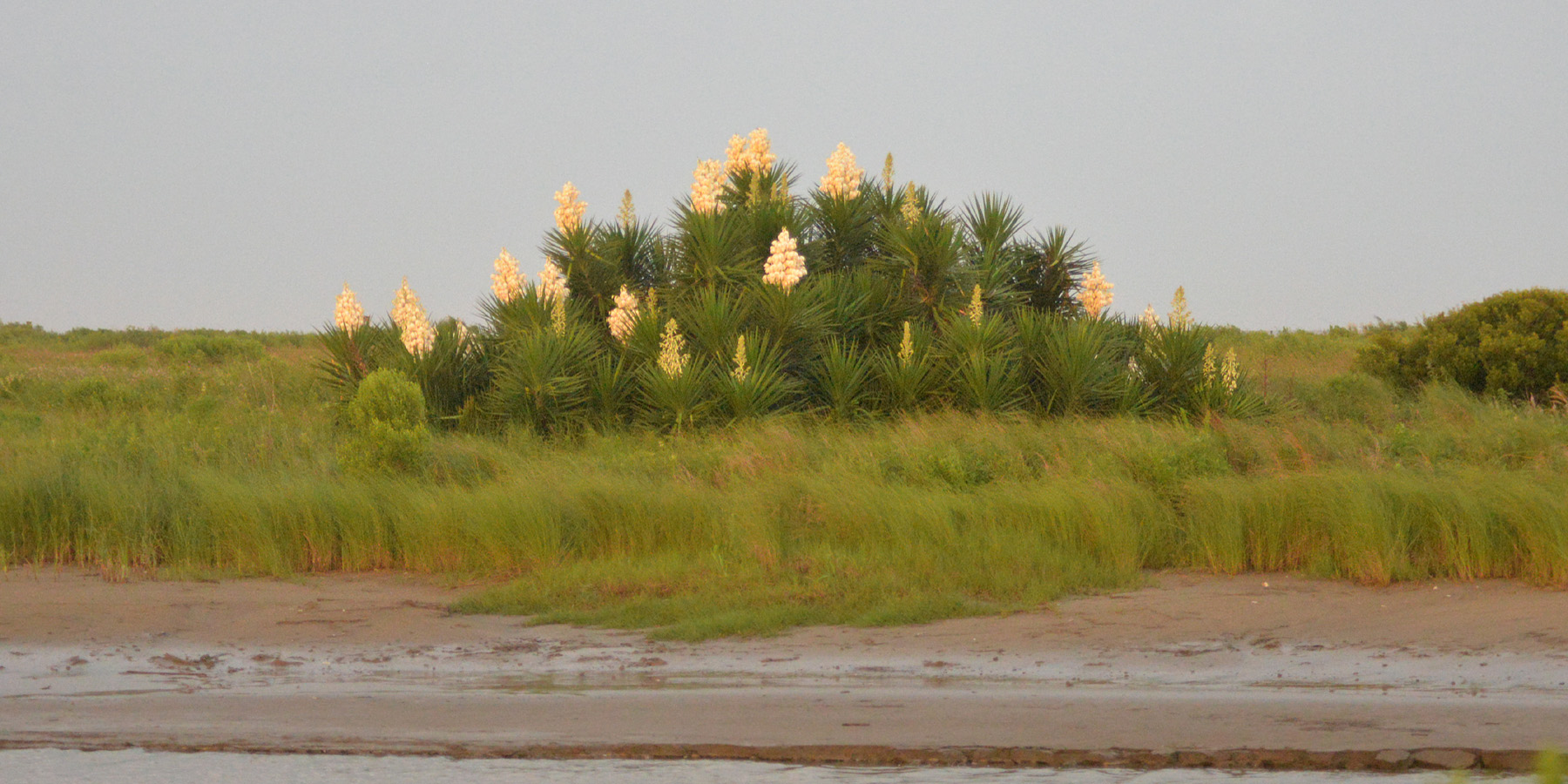
Spanish Dager (Yucca sp.) catching the last rays before sunset at Sea Rim State Park.

== See also ==
- Jocelyn Nungaray National Wildlife Refuge (formerly Anahuac NWR), a nearby wildlife refuge to the west.
- List of Texas state parks
