= State wildlife trails (United States) =

State wildlife trails in the United States are state-sponsored systems of hiking and driving trails developed for the benefit of birdwatching and wildlife enthusiasts. They have been created and maintained by state governments or other state-level entities, both to promote ecology and to promote tourism. The term "trail" used in the names of most of these systems is, in general, a misnomer as that these trail networks are not single routes and are connected by motorways.

These wildlife trail systems typically cover multiple wildlife viewing sites covering large areas of their respective states. Viewing sites may include nature preserves, state parks, national parks, and other venues.

The first of these trail systems was the Great Texas Coastal Birding Trail. Numerous other trail systems have been opened throughout the country since.

Apart from these state-maintained trail networks, some nature-advocacy groups and other entities have defined their own "trails" (a notable example being the Audubon Society's Great River Birding Trail that spans the entire Mississippi River). These are not discussed here.

== Trail systems by state ==
The following are state nature trails found in each state.

=== Alabama ===
Alabama has developed a total of 8 birding trails, with 280 locations as of 2019. There are locations to watch birds in 65 of Alabama's 67 counties.

- Appalachian Highlands Birding Trail
- Alabama Coastal Birding Trail
- Black Belt Nature and Heritage Trail
- North Alabama Birding Trail
- Piedmont Plateau Birding Trail
- Piney Woods Birding Trail
- West Alabama Birding Trail
- Wiregrass Birding Trail

=== Alaska ===
- Alaska Coastal Wildlife Viewing Trail

=== Arizona ===
- Southeastern Arizona Birding Trail

=== California ===
- Central Coast Birding Trail
- Eastern Sierra Birding Trail

=== Colorado ===
- Great Pikes Peak Birding Trail
- Pawnee National Grassland Self-Guided Bird Tour
- Colorado Birding Trail

=== Connecticut ===
- Connecticut Coastal Birding Trail

=== Florida ===
- Great Florida Birding Trail

=== Georgia ===
- Georgia's Colonial Coast Birding Trail

=== Kansas ===
- Kansas Birding and Prairie Flora Trails

=== Louisiana ===
- Grand Isle Birding Trail

=== Kentucky ===
- John James Audubon Birding Trail

=== Minnesota ===
- Pine to Prairie Birding Trail
- Minnesota River Valley Birding Trail

=== Montana ===
- Great Montana Birding and Wildlife Trail

=== New Jersey ===
- New Jersey Birding & Wildlife Trails

=== New Mexico ===
- Southwest New Mexico Birding Trail

=== New York ===
- Audubon Niagara Birding Trails

=== North Dakota ===
- Steele Birding Drive
- Bismarck-Mandan Birding Drive
- Central Dakota Birding Drive

=== Ohio ===
- Southern Ohio Birding and Heritage Trail

=== Oregon ===
- Klamath Basin Birding Trail
- Oregon Cascade Birding Trail

=== Pennsylvania ===
- Susquehanna River Birding and Wildlife Trail

=== Texas ===
- Great Texas Coastal Birding Trail
- Heart of Texas Wildlife Trail
- Panhandle Plains Wildlife Trail
- Prairies and Pineywoods Wildlife Trail

=== Utah ===
- Great Salt Lake Birding Trails

=== Vermont ===
- Lake Champlain Birding Trail

=== Virginia ===
- Virginia Birding and Wildlife Trail

=== Washington ===
- Great Washington Birding Trail

=== Wisconsin ===
- Great Wisconsin Birding Trail

== See also ==
- Long-distance trails in the United States
