= Demi-John Island, Texas =

Demi-John Island
- Unincorporated community
- Interactive map of Demi-John Island
- Location within Texas Demi-John Island (the United States)
- Coordinates: 29°05′12″N 95°16′47″W
- Country: United States
- State: Texas
- County: San Jacinto County

Demi-John Island is a residential, unincorporated, community near the Brazoria National Wildlife Refuge, nine miles east of Lake Jackson, in southeast Brazoria County, Texas, United States.

== History ==
Demi-John Island was shown on highway maps in the 1980s, but no population estimates were available until 2000, where it reportedly had 18 residents.
