= Harris Neck National Wildlife Refuge =

National wildlife refuge in Georgia, USA

- IUCN category IV (habitat/species management area)
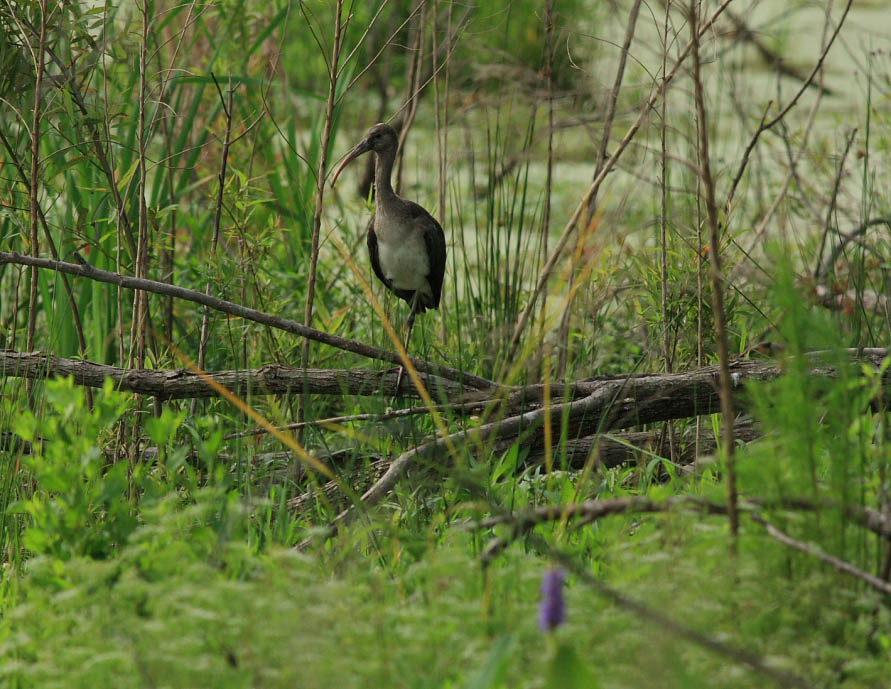
- A juvenile white ibis in the Harris Neck National Wildlife Refuge

- Location within Georgia Location within the United States
- Interactive map of Harris Neck National Wildlife Refuge
- Location: McIntosh County, Georgia, United States
- Nearest city: Riceboro, Georgia
- Coordinates: 31°38′00″N 81°16′00″W
- Area: 2,762 acres (11.18 km^{2})
- Established: 1962
- Governing body: U.S. Fish and Wildlife Service
- Website: Harris Neck National Wildlife Refuge

Harris Neck National Wildlife Refuge was established in 1962. It consists of 2,762 acres (11.18 km^{2}) of saltwater marsh, grassland, mixed deciduous woods, and cropland located on an abandoned military airfield in McIntosh County, Georgia, north of the intersection of Route 131 and Harris Neck Airport Road, about 30 miles (48 km) southwest of Savannah, Georgia.

== Early history ==
Harris Neck is a coastal peninsula located 30 miles (48 km) south of Savannah, Georgia in McIntosh County. The nearest town is South Newport, six miles (10 km) to the west. Originally named Dickinson's Neck, the peninsula was renamed when William Thomas Harris became the principal land owner in the mid-18th century.

The land was deeded to a former slave in 1865 by a plantation owner. Black families settled in the area and built houses as well as oyster and crab processing factories.

The original Harris Neck airfield was built sometime between 1929 and 1932. Named "Harris Neck Intermediate Field Site #8", it was an emergency airfield for commercial planes on the Richmond-Jacksonville air route. The field consisted of an irregularly-shaped 93-acre (380,000 m^{2}) sod parcel, with two sod runways 2,600' east/west & 2,550' north/south in a criss-cross pattern. The field was said to be illuminated, but to offer no services. Harris Neck airfield closed to the public on 1 January 1942 when the Civil Air Patrol began anti-submarine flights. It was evidently abandoned later that same year, when a new military airfield was built a half-mile north. There is no trace of its existence today.

== Army airfield ==
In mid-1942, the Army Air Force decided to build a base at Harris Neck. The land was expropriated and families were given two weeks to remove themselves. At the time of transfer, black families (who owned 1,102 acres) were given $26.90 per acre and the white families (who owned 1,532 acres) were given $37.31 per acre. This included the 225-acre (0.91 km^{2}) Livingston estate which included the Lorillard mansion and a deep-water dock. Construction was started on 15 July 1942 by the United States Army Air Forces First Air Force. The original plan provided for two runways. The Army's decision to add a third runway required the acquisition of additional land. A detachment of men from the 855th Guard Squadron, stationed at Hunter Army Air Field occupied the Harris Neck facility on 7 December 1942. It was activated on 28 January 1943 as an auxiliary of Dale Mabry Army Airfield in Tallahassee, Florida.

Today, there is very little left to show that the area was once an airfield. Other than the overgrown runways, taxiways, revetments, munitions bunkers and the bore sighting range, the only structure that still exists on the former military airfield is a water fountain which must have belonged to Livingston House. The area is very overgrown, access is limited by "keep out" signs.

Former residents of the displaced community and their descendants are attempting to work out a compromise with the federal government to allow them to return to their land, without significantly disrupting the wildlife refuge.

== Wildlife refuge established ==
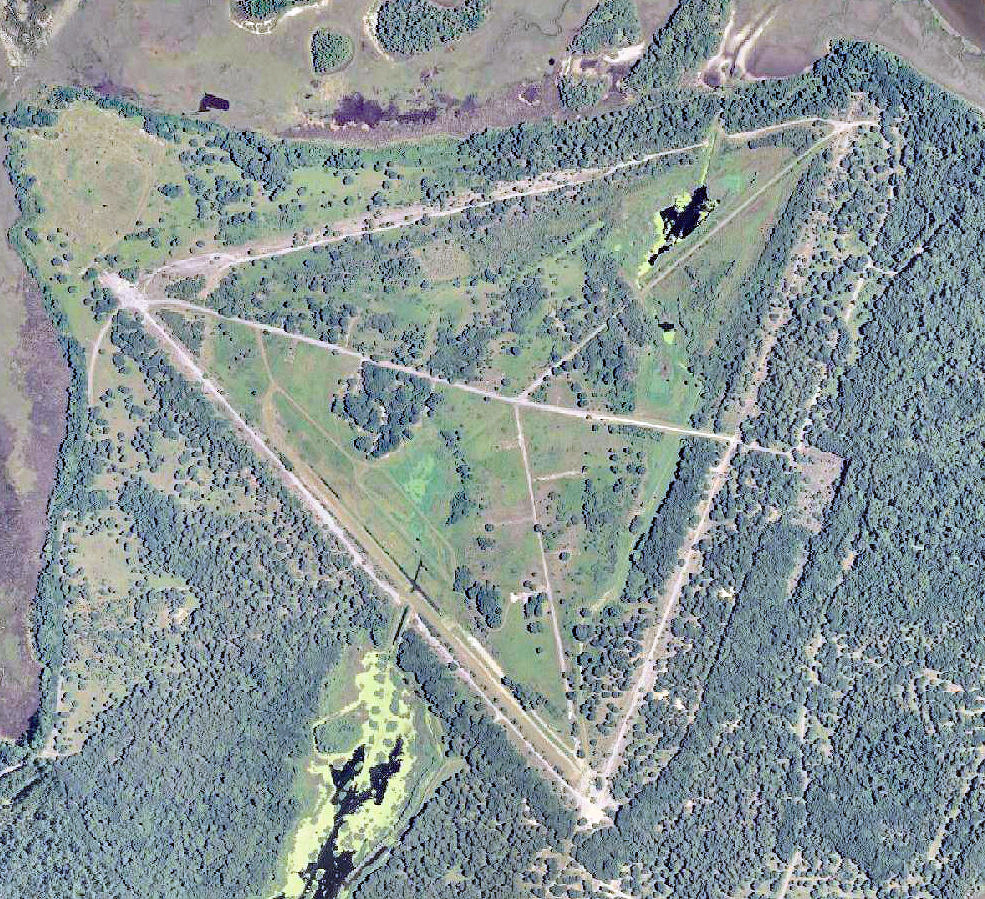
US Geological Survey aerial photo in 2006

The Harris Neck National Wildlife Refuge (HNNWR) was established in 1962 by transfer of federal lands and the World War II Army airfield formerly managed by the Federal Aviation Administration. The refuge consists of 2,762 acres (11.18 km^{2}) of saltwater marsh, grassland, mixed deciduous woods, and cropland.

HNNWR is located in McIntosh County, Georgia. In the summer, thousands of egrets and herons nest in the swamps, while in the winter, large concentrations of ducks (especially mallards, gadwall, and green-winged teal) gather in the marshland and freshwater pools. Harris Neck NWR is also an important nesting area for the wood stork.

The public access to the refuge consists of over 15 miles (24 km) of paved roads and trails provide the visitor easy access to the many different habitats.

Chosen for its accessibility and bird diversity, Harris Neck is one of 18 sites forming the Colonial Coast Birding Trail, inaugurated in 2000.
