= Georgia's Colonial Coast Birding Trail =

The Colonial Coast Birding Trail of Georgia is a wildlife trail that is not a really a "trail", but a series of 18 sites that have been chosen for their excellent birdwatching opportunities.

There are documented sightings in Georgia of at least 413 different bird species. More than 300 species of birds have been documented along Georgia's Colonial Birding Trail. Many of the 18 sites of the Trail have historic buildings, ruins, or historic locations from the 18th and/or 19th centuries.

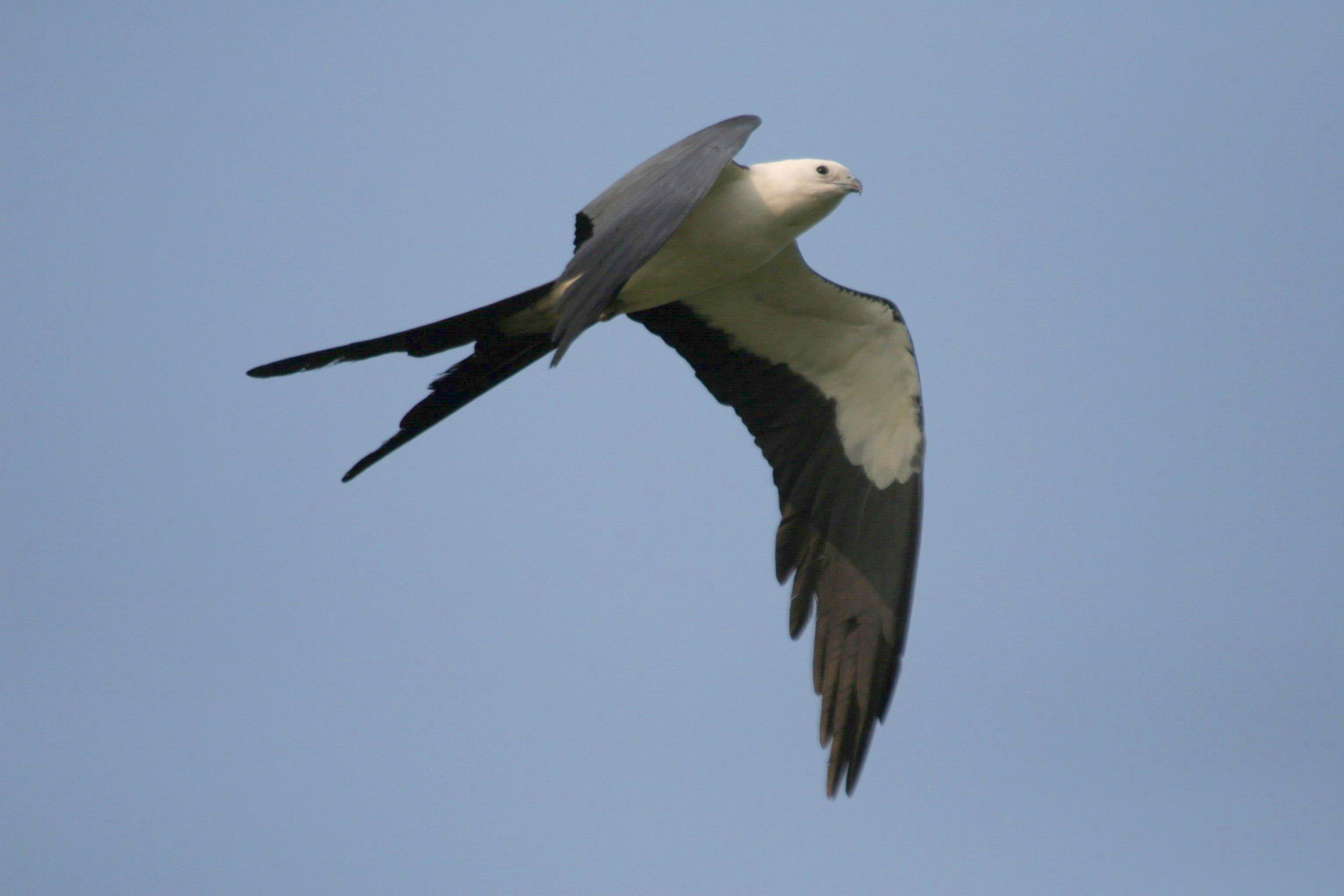
Swallow-tailed kite

While birders can pursue swallow-tailed kites, prothonotary warblers, and other southern specialties, nonbirders can explore Gilded Age mansions, Civil War forts, or rice and indigo plantations. Running parallel to Interstate 95, the trail is designed to give travelers reason to stop. The state teaches birding basics to the staffs of visitors' centers, state parks, and historical sites. A periodic bulletin called the Bird's Eye Review alerts these staffers to the latest avian happenings, such as the fall migration of peregrine falcons or the spring arrival of endangered wood storks, the trail's symbol on signs at each site.

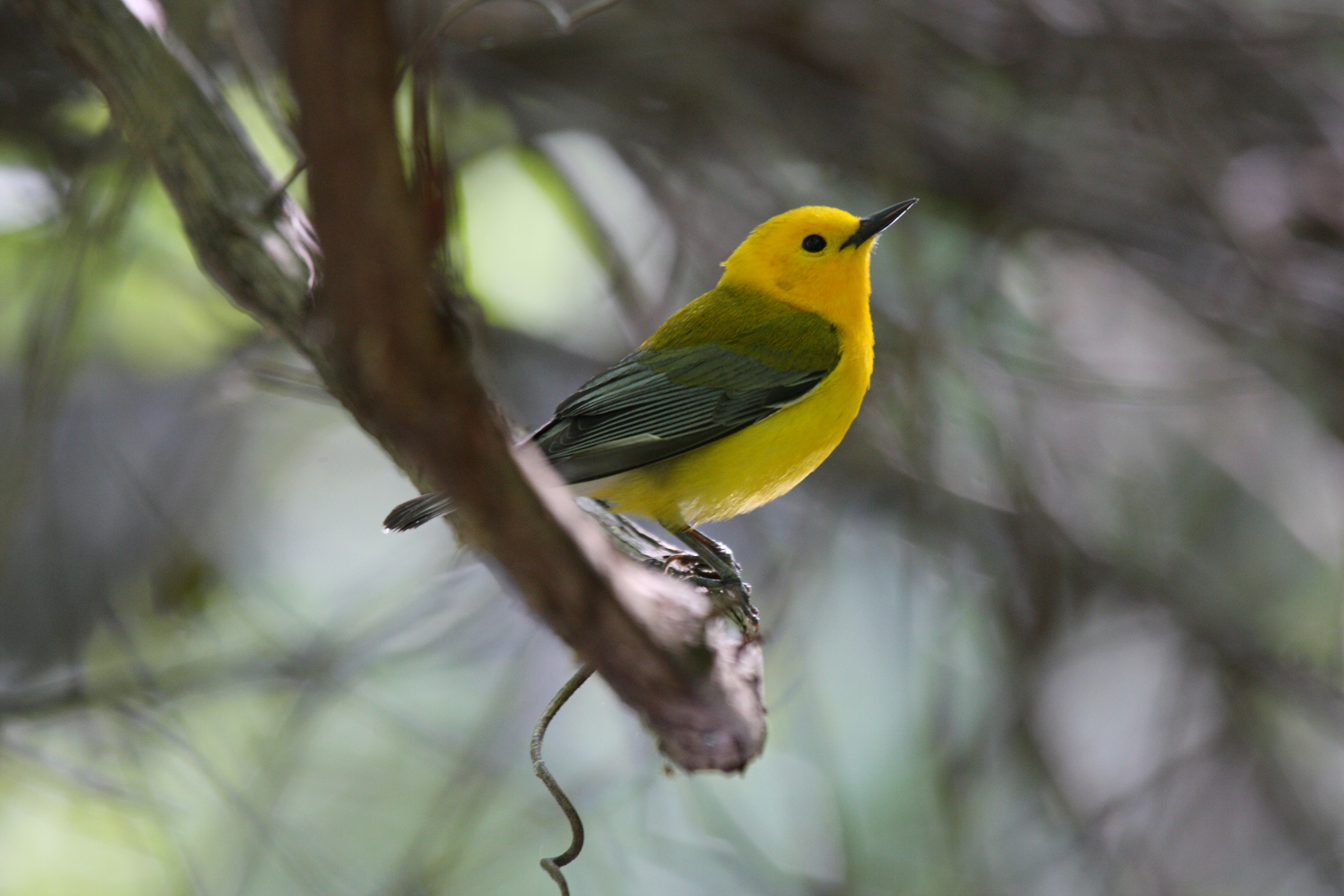
Male prothonotary warbler

... the southeastern coast, with its great variety of relatively wild habitats for waterfowl and other species, is one of the premier birding spots in the country. A large number of birds are annual residents, and many others migrate through or spend part of the year on or around the sea islands. More than three hundred bird species have been sighted along the Georgia coast. The State of Georgia has highlighted this avian extravaganza by designating the Colonial Coast Birding Trail, which pinpoints numerous birding hot spots, from the north beach of Tybee Island to the wilds of the undeveloped Cumberland Island National Seashore.

Woodland lanes lined with stately live oaks, glistening tidal flats thronged with sandpipers and terns, and broad, sweeping salt marshes where wading birds abound—these are just a few of the memorable landscapes waiting for visitors along the Georgia coast. Practically anywhere in this region can be good for birding, but to find the best of the best, binocular-clad travelers can focus on the 18 sites featured on this birding trail. Most of these locations are also designated Important Bird Areas, underscoring how vital they are to all sorts of migrating birds that stream by. Birds like black skimmers, clapper rails, and American oystercatchers may be found in every season, and fall migration brings many more, including piping plovers and varied songbird flocks.

== Sites ==
Information below is presented in more detail in the Georgia's Colonial Coast Birding Trail, Georgia DNR - Wildlife Resources Division (and is the source material for table).

Name	Specialties
Ansley Hodges M.A.R.S.H. Project (Altamaha Wildlife Management Area)	Wood stork, swallow-tailed kite, bald eagle, king rail, painting bunting, mottled duck, wood duck, white ibis, glossy ibis
Crooked River State Park	Osprey, bald eagle, wood stork, painted bunting
Cumberland Island National Seashore	Peregrine falcon, painting bunting, red knot, black skimmer, warblers
Fort McAllister State Historic Park	Painted bunting, wood duck, northern harrier, bald eagle, osprey
Fort Morris State Historic Site	Yellow-throated warbler, marsh wren, clapper rail, painted bunting
Fort Pulaski National Monument	Painted bunting
St. Simons Island - Gould's Inlet & East Beach	American oystercatcher, black skimmer, painted bunting, bald eagle, least tern, northern gannet
Harris Neck National Wildlife Refuge	Wood stork, white ibis, painted bunting
Hofwyl-Broadfield Plantation State Historic Site	Wood stork, bald eagle, osprey, glossy ibis, painted bunting, yellow-throated warbler, sharp-tailed sparrow, northern parula
Jekyll Island - causeway	Osprey, bald eagle, clapper rail, northern harrier, roseate spoonbill, red knot, black-necked stilt, white ibis, wood stork
Jekyll Island - North End Beach	Least tern, red-throated loon, scoters, American oystercatcher, black skimmer
Jekyll Island - South End Beach	Black skimmer, American oystercatcher, marbled goodwit, jaegers, south polar skua, northern gannet, piping plover, glaucous gull
Melon Bluff Nature Preserve	Wild turkey, wood stork, clapper rail, roseate spoonbill, painted bunting
Okefenokee National Wildlife Refuge	Sandhill crane, red-cockaded woodpecker, prothonotary warbler, northern parula, Bachman's sparrow
Richmond Hill - J.F. Gregory Park	Prothonotary warbler, wood duck, barred owl
Savannah–Ogeechee Canal Museum & Nature Center	Prothonotary warbler, northern parula, Swainson's warbler, wood duck, Mississippi kite, swallow-tailed kite
Skidaway Island State Park	Osprey, painted bunting, pileated woodpecker, bald eagle
Tybee Island - North Beach	Purple sandpiper, piping plover, northern gannets
