= San Bernard National Wildlife Refuge =

Bird sanctuary in Texas, USA

- IUCN category IV (habitat/species management area)
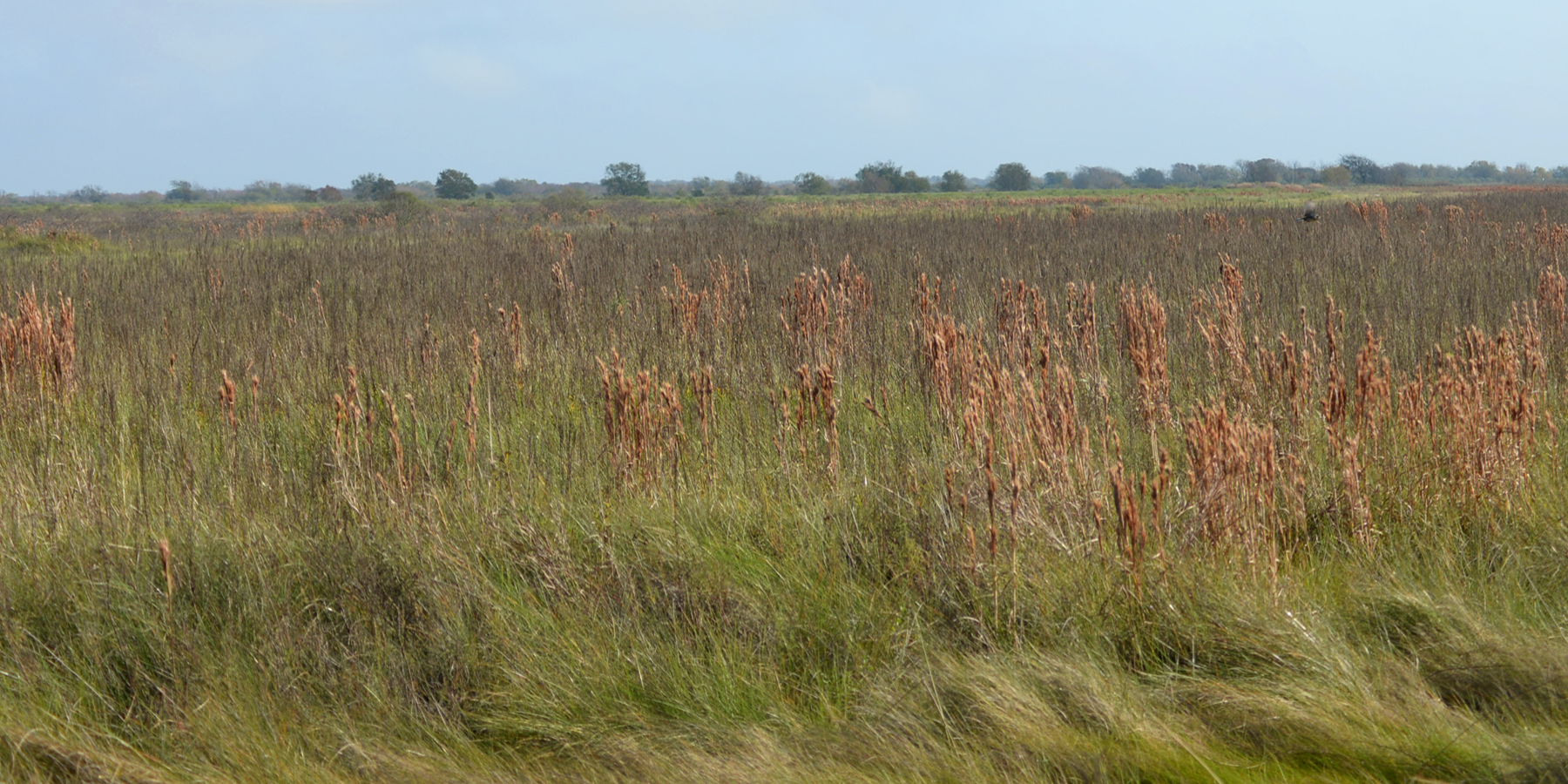

- Location within the United States
- Location: Brazoria, Matagorda counties, Texas, United States
- Nearest city: Freeport, Texas
- Coordinates: 28°52′00″N 95°32′00″W
- Area: 45,730 acres (185.1 km^{2})
- Established: 1969
- Governing body: U.S. Fish and Wildlife Service
- Website: San Bernard National Wildlife Refuge

The San Bernard National Wildlife Refuge is a 45,730-acre (185.1 km^{2}) wildlife conservation area along the coast of Texas (USA), south of the towns of Sweeny and Brazoria, Texas. It encloses a bay behind a barrier island at the Gulf of Mexico. The refuge is located in southern Brazoria and eastern Matagorda counties.

San Bernard National Wildlife Refuge was established in 1969 and provides quality habitat for wintering migratory waterfowl and other bird life. Viewing the rippling marshes and ponds of the refuge gives an image of Texas as it was before settlement.

Three national wildlife refuges on the Texas coast - Brazoria, San Bernard and Big Boggy - form a vital complex of coastal wetlands harboring more than 300 bird species.

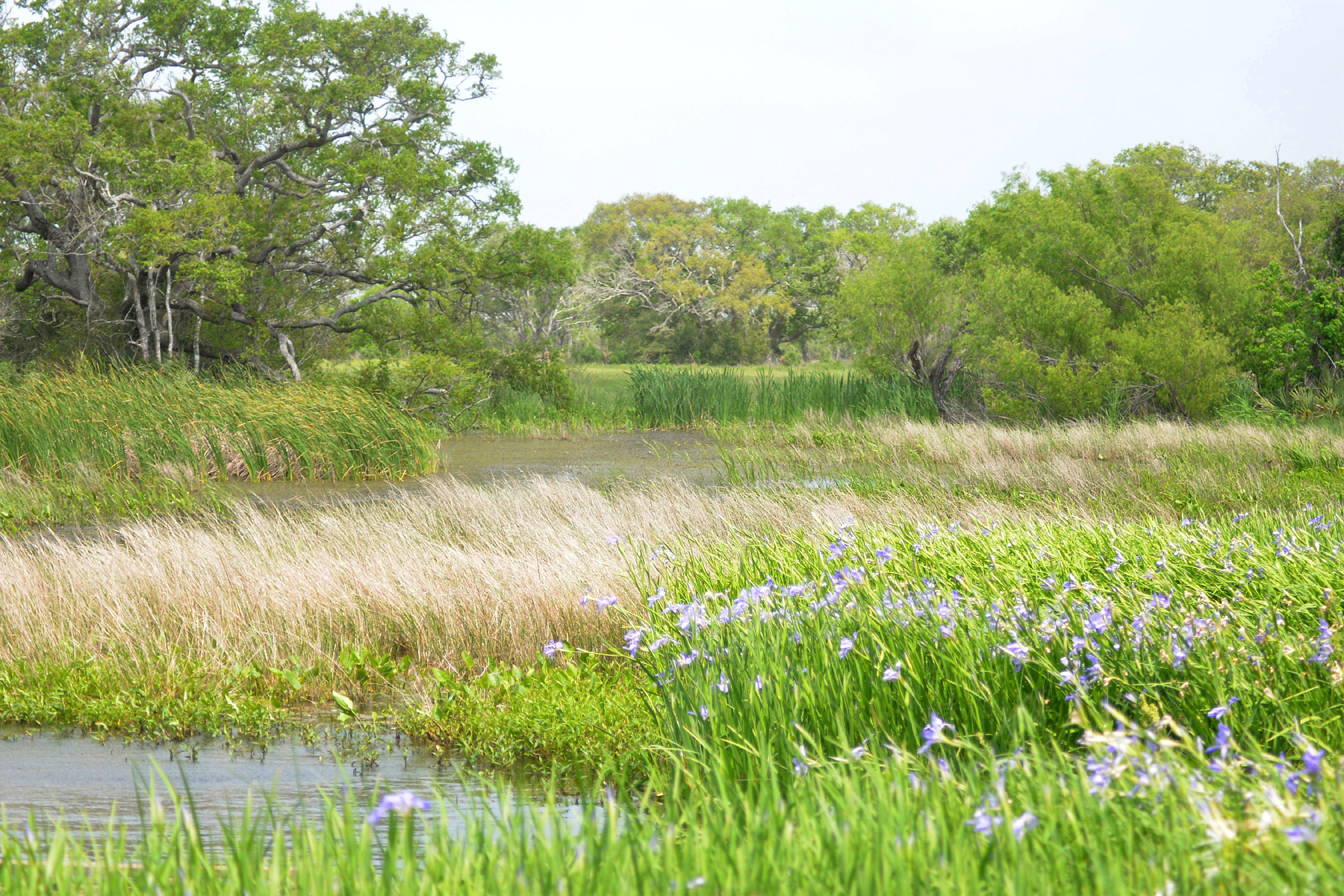
Louisiana iris in bloom near the San Bernard National Wildlife Refuge visitor’s center.

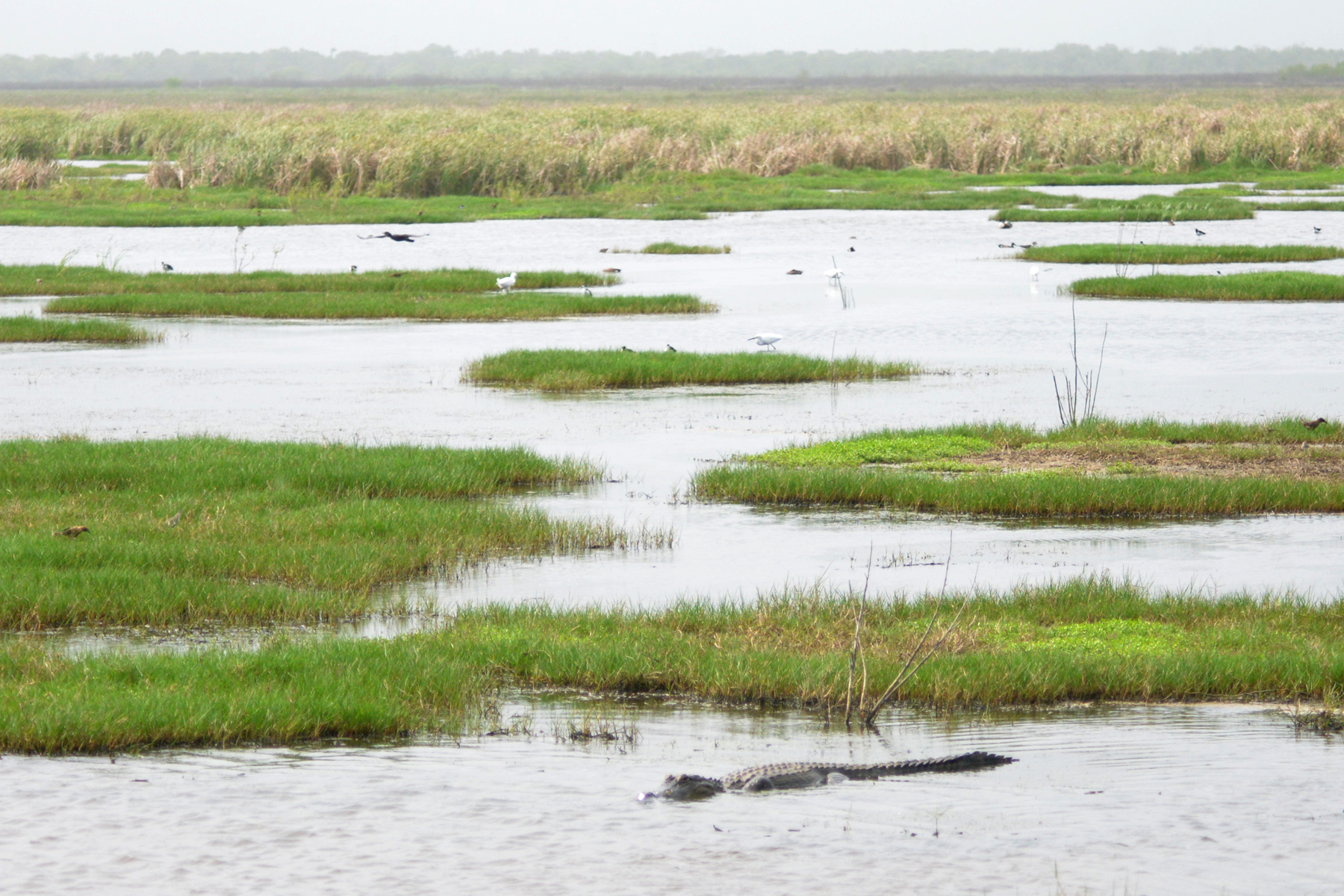
An American alligator and birds in Moccasin Pond, San Bernard National Wildlife Refuge.

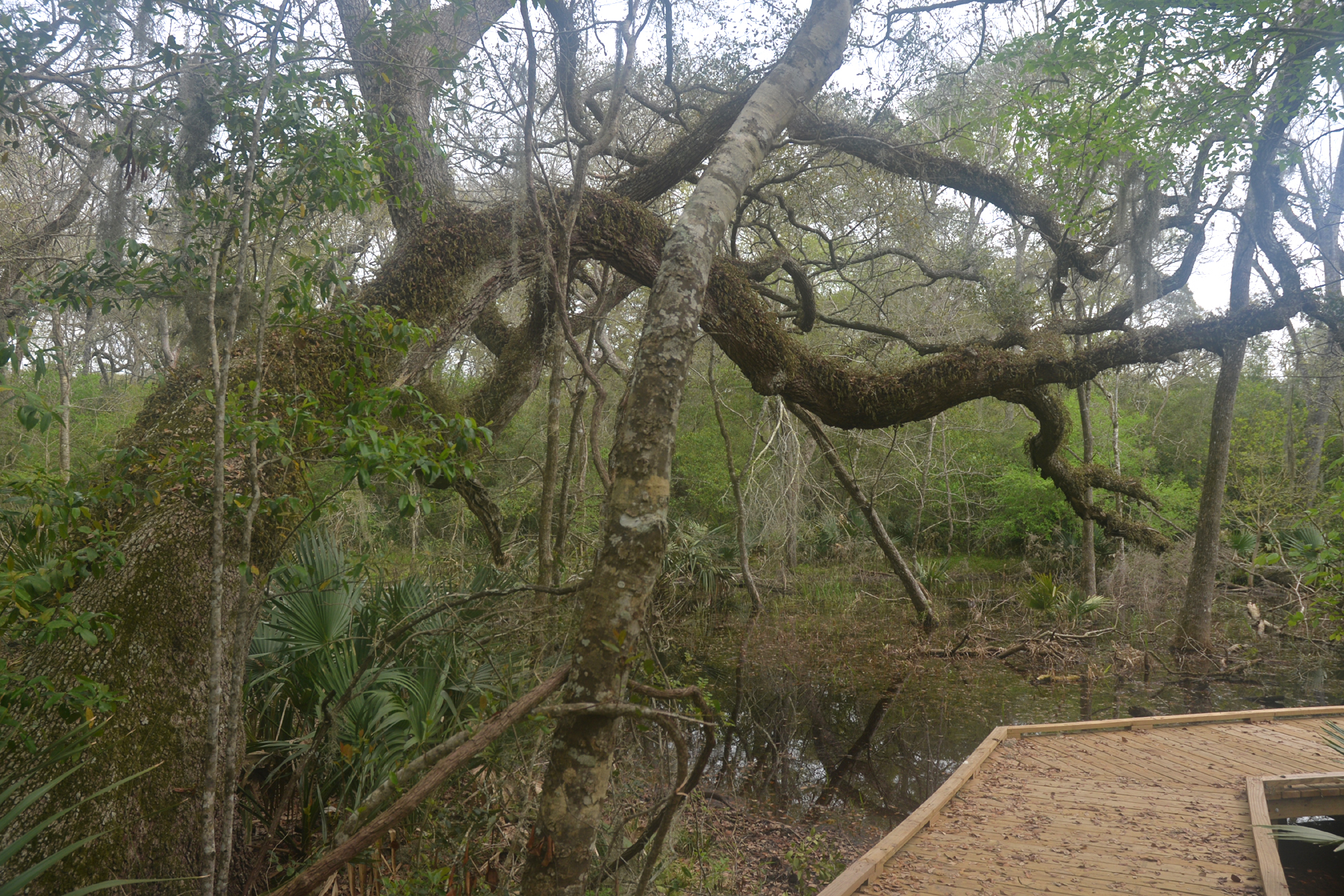
A southern live oak with resurrection fern on the San Bernard Oak Trail boardwalk.
