= McFaddin and Texas Point National Wildlife Refuges =

National Wildlife Refuge in Jefferson County, Texas

McFaddin National Wildlife Refuge
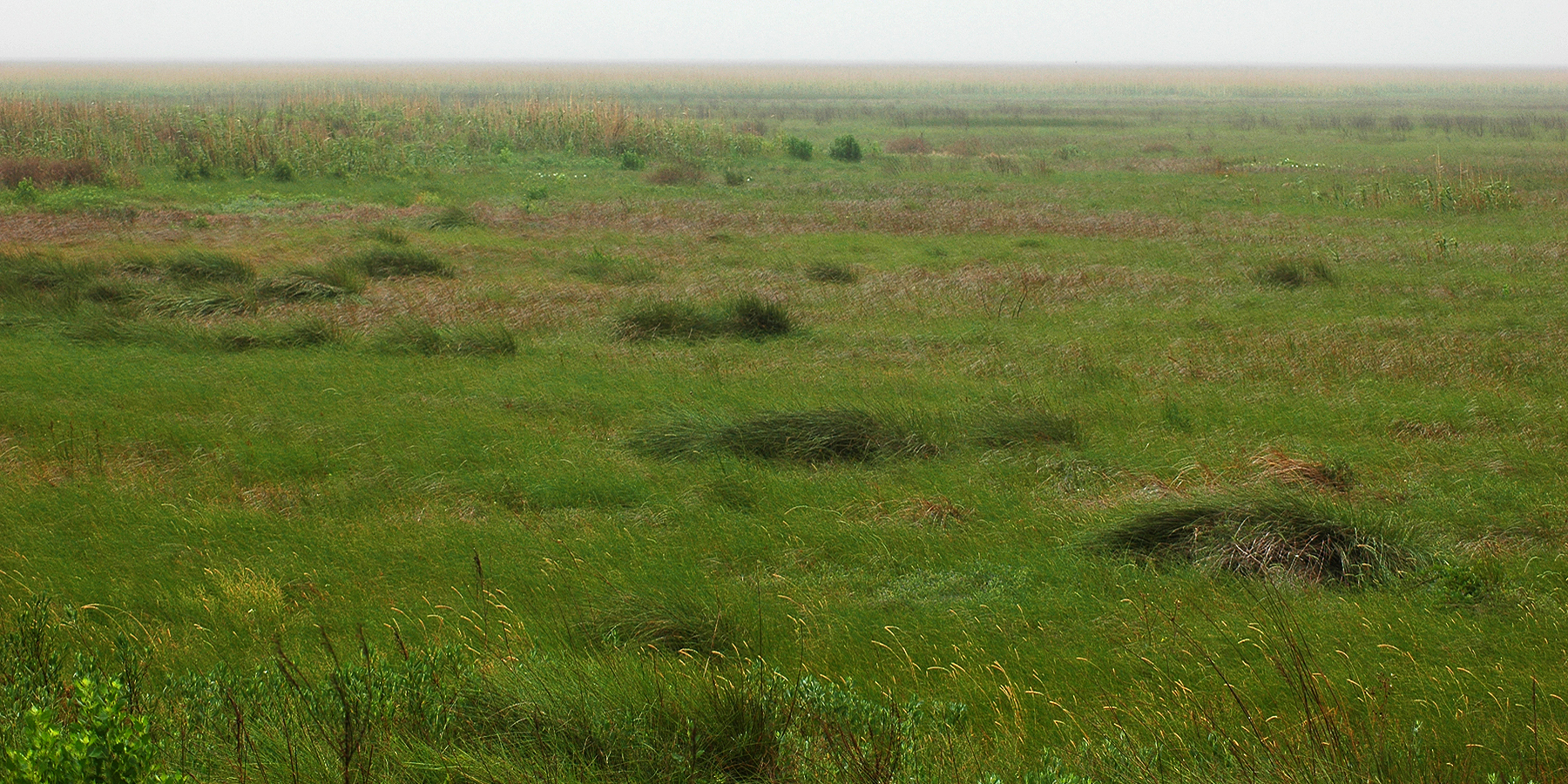
- McFaddin National Wildlife Refuge
- Interactive map of McFaddin National Wildlife Refuge
- Location: Jefferson County, Texas, United States
- Nearest city: Sabine Pass, Texas
- Coordinates: 29°40′00″N 94°09′00″W
- Area: 58,861 acres (238.20 km^{2})
- Established: 1980
- Operator: U.S. Fish and Wildlife Service
- Website: McFaddin National Wildlife Refuge

McFaddin National Wildlife Refuge and Texas Point National Wildlife Refuge are both located in southern Jefferson County on the upper Texas coast. McFaddin, the larger one, is located at around 29°40′00″N 94°09′00″W, has a total area of 58,861.43 acres (238.2038 km^{2}). Texas Point, the smaller, is located near the Louisiana border at Sabine Pass, around 29°42′00″N 93°53′00″W, and has 8,952.02 acres (36.2275 km^{2}). The refuges have a combined 105.96 square miles (274.4 km^{2}) of fish and wildlife habitat.

Texas Point and McFaddin refuges supply important feeding and resting habitat for migrating and wintering populations of waterfowl using the Central Flyway. Feeding flocks of snow geese have exceeded 70,000 birds at McFaddin.

Dozens of migratory bird species use habitat on both refuges to feed, rest, nest and raise their young. McFaddin contains one of the densest populations of American alligators in Texas. Alligators are most easily seen during the spring, but are often visible throughout the summer and fall.

Mammal species native to Texas include the muskrat, North American river otter, American mink, raccoon, striped skunk, Virginia opossum, Mexican long-nosed armadillo, gray fox and bobcat.

Large portions of both refuges are tidally influenced, creating estuarine environments important to a variety of fish, shrimp and crabs, as well as other life forms higher on the food chain that feed on such organisms. These estuaries are productive communities and are vital to the life cycle of many marine species. Some of the more commonly sought after fish found in refuge waters include red drum, flounder, alligator gar and blue catfish.

Located on the coast, Sea Rim State Park borders McFaddin National Wildlife Refuge.

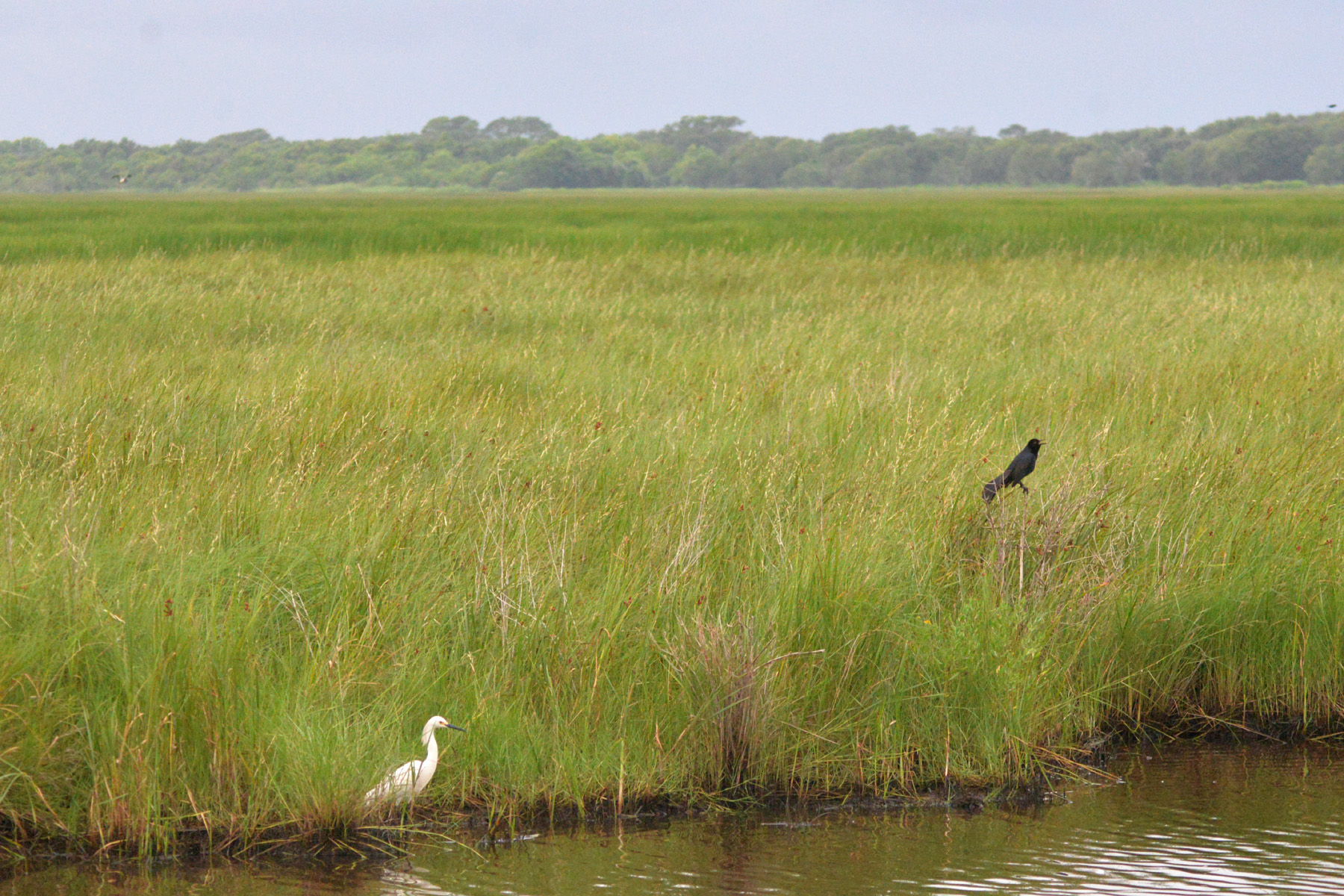
Snowy Egret and Boat-tailed Grackle, Texas Point National Wildlife Refuge

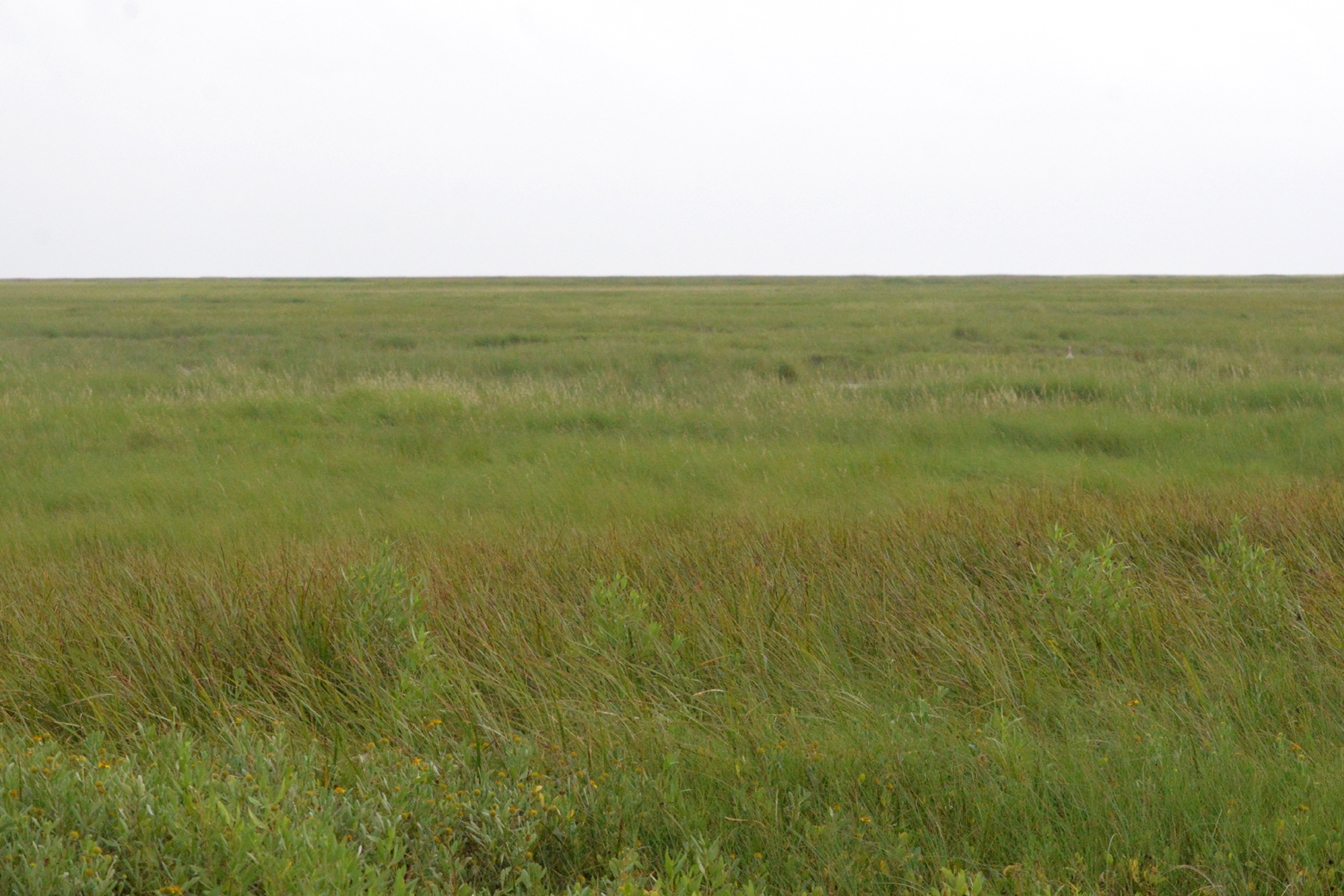
Marshes and grasslands seen from the Cattle Walk Trail, Texas Point National Wildlife Refuge

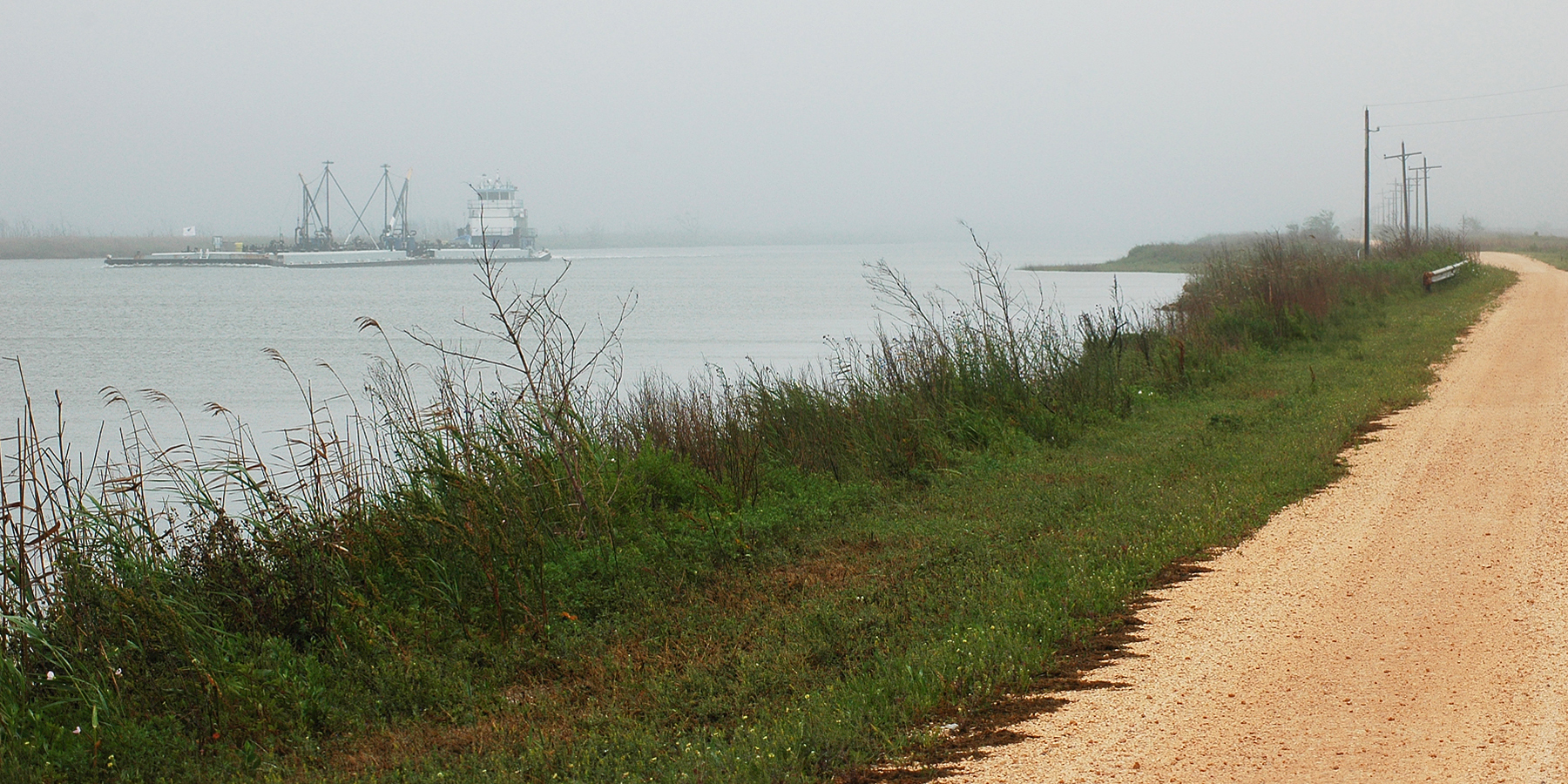
A barge on the Intracoastal Waterway passing McFaddin National Wildlife Refuge
