= Big Boggy National Wildlife Refuge =

Bird sanctuary in southeastern Matagorda County, Texas

- IUCN category IV (habitat/species management area)
- Location within the United States
- Location: Matagorda County, Texas, United States
- Nearest city: Bay City, Texas
- Coordinates: 28°45′30″N 95°48′45″W
- Area: 5,000 acres (20 km^{2})
- Established: 1983
- Governing body: U.S. Fish and Wildlife Service
- Website: Big Boggy National Wildlife Refuge

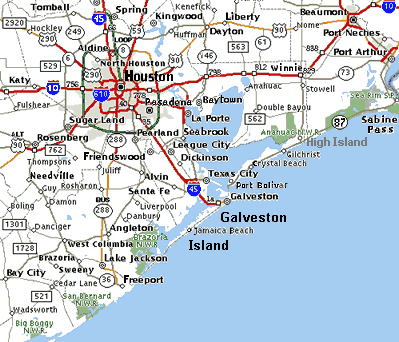
Big Boggy National Wildlife Refuge (bottom left) along the coast of southeast Texas.

The Big Boggy National Wildlife Refuge is a wildlife conservation area along the coast of Texas (USA) in southeastern Matagorda County, south of the towns of Bay City and Wadsworth. It borders a bay behind a barrier island at the Gulf of Mexico. Established in 1983 and encompassing 5,000 acres (20 km^{2}) of salt marsh.

Big Boggy National Wildlife Refuge is for the birds. The refuge is only open to the public for waterfowl hunting season and for special activities.

Three national wildlife refuges on the Texas coast - Brazoria, San Bernard and Big Boggy - form a vital complex of coastal wetlands harboring more than 300 bird species.

The salt marsh habitat is home to waterfowl, shorebirds, wading, and waterbirds. Egrets, spoonbills, and pelicans nest in East Matagorda Bay. The threatened species of eastern black rail also live in the refuge.
