= Prairies and Pineywoods Wildlife Trail =

Trail in Texas, USA

Coordinates: 32°N 96°W

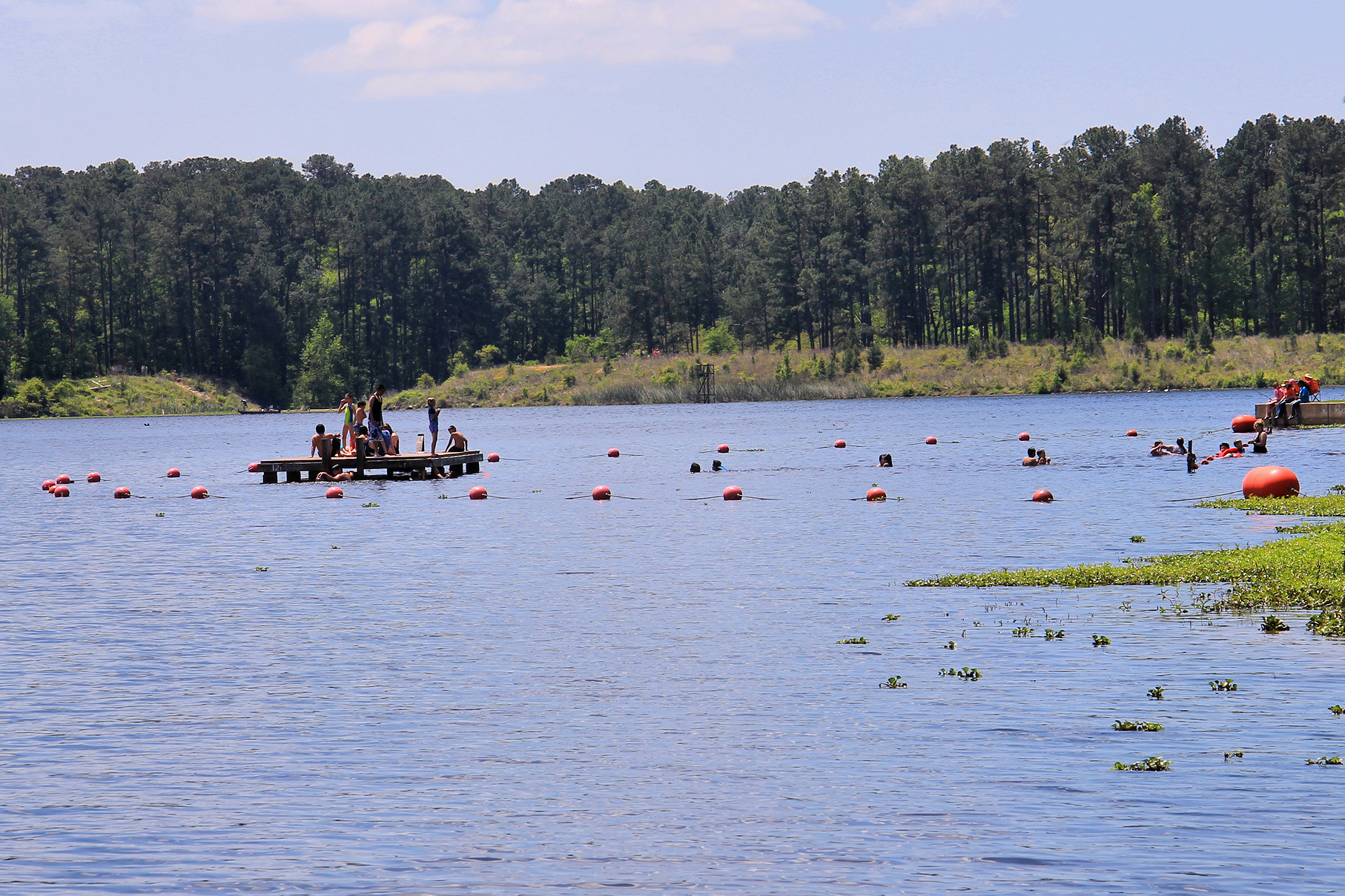
- Huntsville State Park is on the Big Sandy Loop of the Trail
- Location: East Texas
- Use: Bird watching / hiking
- Sights: Sam Houston National Forest, Davy Crockett National Forest, Sabine National Forest

The Prairies and Pineywoods Wildlife Trail is a state-designated system of trails and wildlife sanctuaries in the Piney Woods of East Texas in the United States. It is one of the four major wildlife trail systems designated by the State of Texas.

The trail system consists of two separate groups of rails. The western trails, which are more prairie terrain, cover an area stretching from Brenham and College Station in the south to Wichita Falls and Denison in the north. The eastern trails, which are more woodland terrain, cover an area stretching from Huntsville and Hemphill in the south to Paris and Texarkana in the north.

The trails include locations in Sam Houston National Forest, Davy Crockett National Forest, and Sabine National Forest.
