= Brazoria National Wildlife Refuge =

Wildlife conservation area in Texas

- IUCN category IV (habitat/species management area)
- Location within the United States
- Location: Brazoria County, Texas, United States
- Nearest city: Angleton, Texas
- Coordinates: 29°05′00″N 95°15′00″W
- Area: 44,414 acres (179.74 km^{2})
- Established: 1969
- Governing body: U.S. Fish and Wildlife Service
- Website: Brazoria National Wildlife Refuge

The Brazoria National Wildlife Refuge is a 44,414-acre (179.74 km^{2}) wildlife conservation area along the coast of Texas (USA), east of the towns of Angleton and Lake Jackson, Texas. It borders Christmas Bay and the Intracoastal Waterway, separated from the Gulf of Mexico by Follet's Island.

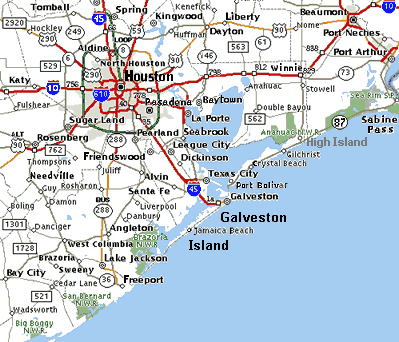
Brazoria National Wildlife Refuge (bottom center), east of Lake Jackson, along the coast of southeast Texas.

Brazoria National Wildlife Refuge was established in 1969 and provides quality habitat for wintering migratory waterfowl and other bird life. The refuge contains a freshwater slough which winds through salt marshes.

In winter, more than 100,000 snow geese, Canada geese, pintail, northern shoveler, teal, gadwall, American wigeon, mottled ducks, and sandhill cranes fill the numerous ponds and sloughs to capacity.

In summer, birds which nest on the refuge include 10 species of herons and egrets, white ibis, roseate spoonbill, mottled duck, white-tailed kite, clapper rail, horned lark, seaside sparrow, black skimmer, and scissor-tailed flycatcher.

Three national wildlife refuges on the Texas coast - Brazoria, San Bernard and Big Boggy - form a vital complex of coastal wetlands harboring more than 300 bird species.

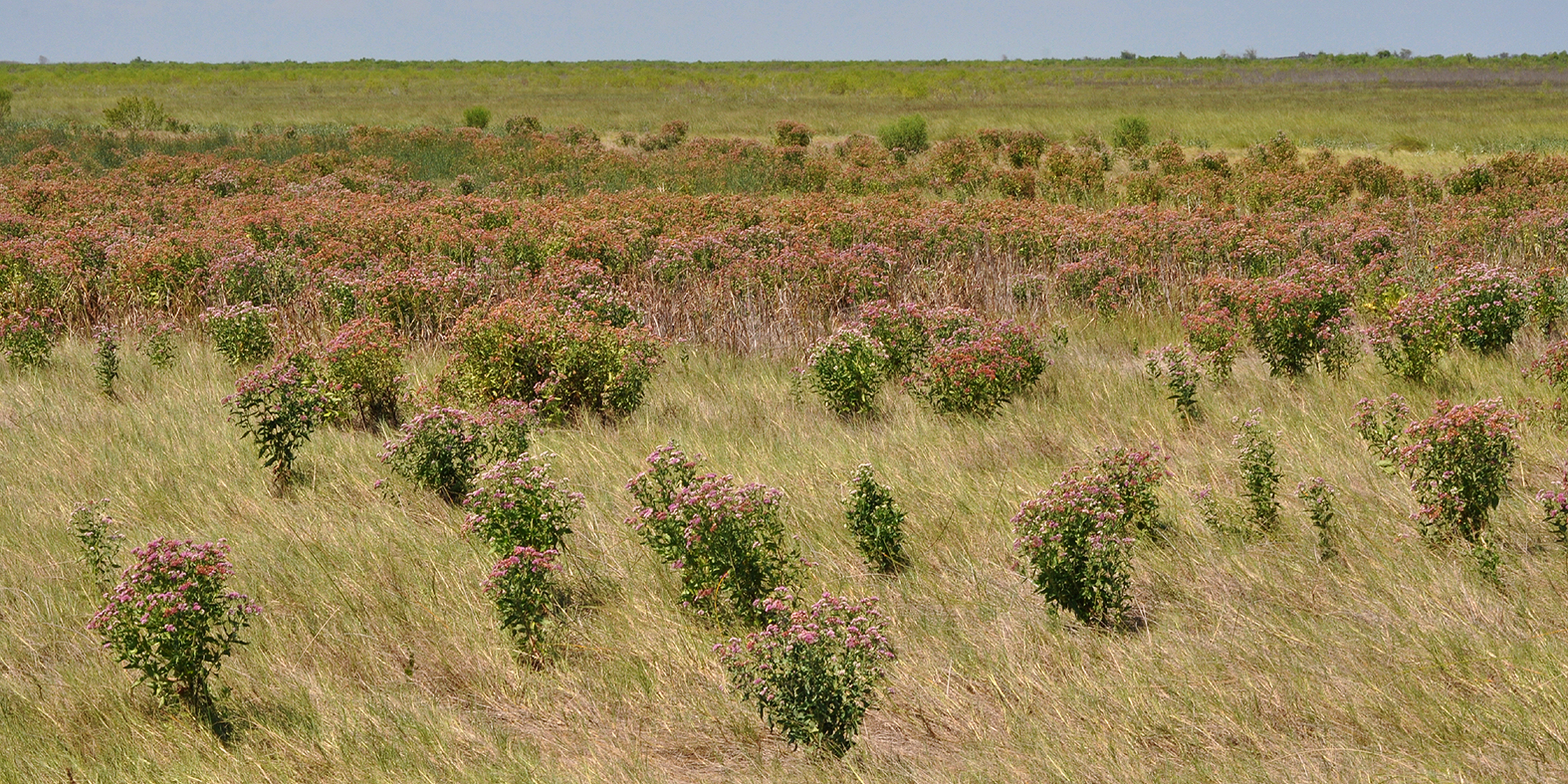
Saltmarsh fleabane (Pluchea odorata), Brazoria National Wildlife Refuge, Brazoria County, Texas, USA (24 August 2013)
