= Heart of Texas Wildlife Trail =

System of wildlife trails and sanctuaries

Coordinates: 30°N 98°W

- Location: Central Texas
- Use: Bird watching / hiking
- Sights: Texas Hill Country, rivers, lakes

The Heart of Texas Wildlife Trail is a state-designated system of trails and wildlife sanctuaries in Central Texas in the United States. It is one of the four major wildlife trail systems designated by the State of Texas.

The trail system is divided into two main groupings of wildlife viewing sites. The first stretches from the Coleman area, near Abilene, through Austin and San Antonio, to Laredo. The second is a cluster in the Texas Hill Country and southwest Rio Grande Valley bounded roughly by San Angelo, Del Rio, and Fredericksburg.
