= Panhandle Plains Wildlife Trail =

Trail in Texas, USA

Coordinates: 33°N 100°W

- Location: Texas Pandandle
- Use: Bird watching / hiking

The Panhandle Plains Wildlife Trail is a state-designated system of trails and wildlife sanctuaries in the Texas Panhandle in the United States. It is one of the four major wildlife trail systems designated by the State of Texas.

The trail system forms a loop that runs from Abilene to Lubbock and Amarillo, around to Canadian and Shamrock, and back to Abilene.
