= WNGH =

WNGH may refer to:

- WNGH-TV
- WNGH-FM
