= Protected areas of Georgia (U.S. state) =

Map of Georgia

The protected areas of Georgia cover almost one million acres (4,000 km^{2}) of the state. These areas are managed by different federal and state level authorities and receive varying levels of protection. Some areas are managed as wilderness while others are operated with acceptable commercial exploitation. On the Federal level, Georgia contains 1 Biosphere Reserve, 15 National Park Service Managed Sites, 1 National Forest and 8 Wildlife Refuges. Georgia is home to 63 state parks, 48 of which are state parks and 15 that are National Historic Sites, and many state wildlife preserves, under the supervision of the Georgia Department of Parks and Recreation, a division of the Georgia Department of Natural Resources.

== Federal-level protection agencies ==
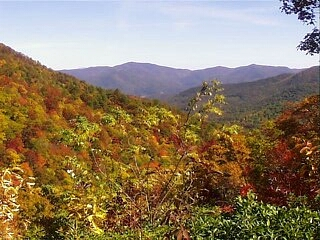
Fall in the Chattahoochee National Forest

Georgia's federally protected areas are managed by agencies within the United States Department of the Interior. The agencies which govern nationally protected places in Georgia are the National Park Service; the U.S. Forest Service; the Bureau of Land Management; and the U.S. Fish and Wildlife Preserve.

=== Areas managed by the National Park Service ===
Georgia has many protected areas and historic sites within its borders which fall under the purview of the National Park Service. These areas include

- Andersonville National Historic Site in Andersonville
- Appalachian National Scenic Trail
- Arabia Mountain National Heritage Area
- Augusta Canal National Heritage Area
- Chattahoochee River National Recreation Area near Atlanta and the
- Chickamauga and Chattanooga National Military Park at Fort Oglethorpe.
- Cumberland Island National Seashore near Saint Marys
- Fort Frederica National Monument on St. Simons Island
- Fort Pulaski National Monument in Savannah
- Gullah/Geechee Cultural Heritage Corridor
- Jimmy Carter National Historic Site near Plains
- Kennesaw Mountain National Battlefield Park near Kennesaw
- Martin Luther King Jr. National Historical Park in Atlanta
- Ocmulgee National Monument at Macon and the
- Trail of Tears National Historic Trail.

Although these are occasionally referred to as national parks, these are not true "National Parks" in the strictest sense. There are 417 units managed by the National Park service (including those 15 in Georgia listed above,) of which 59 are officially designated National Parks as of 2018, none of which are in Georgia.

=== National Forests ===
The U.S. Forest Service oversees the Chattahoochee-Oconee National Forest in northern Georgia. The forest is actually two U.S. National Forests combined, the Oconee National Forest and Chattahoochee National Forest. The area of the Chattahoochee-Oconee National Forest is 865,855 acres (3,504 km^{2}), of which the Chattahoochee National Forest comprises 750,502 acres (3,037 km^{2}) and the Oconee National Forest comprises 115,353 acres (467 km^{2}). The county with the largest portion of the forest is Rabun County, Georgia, which has 148,684 acres (602 km^{2}) within its boundaries.

=== Wildlife Refuges ===
Several Wildlife Refuges in Georgia are overseen by the U.S. Fish and Wildlife Preserve. The areas under that agencies care are the

- Okefenokee National Wildlife Refuge which oversees the Banks Lake National Wildlife Refuge
- Piedmont National Wildlife Refuge and Bond Swamp National Wildlife Refuge
- the Savannah Coastal Refuges Complex which oversees several different refuges including
  - Blackbeard Island National Wildlife Refuge
  - Harris Neck National Wildlife Refuge
  - Savannah National Wildlife Refuge
  - Wassaw National Wildlife Refuge
  - Wolf Island National Wildlife Refuge.
  - Tybee National Wildlife Refuge
  - Pinckney Island National Wildlife Refuge

== State level protected areas ==
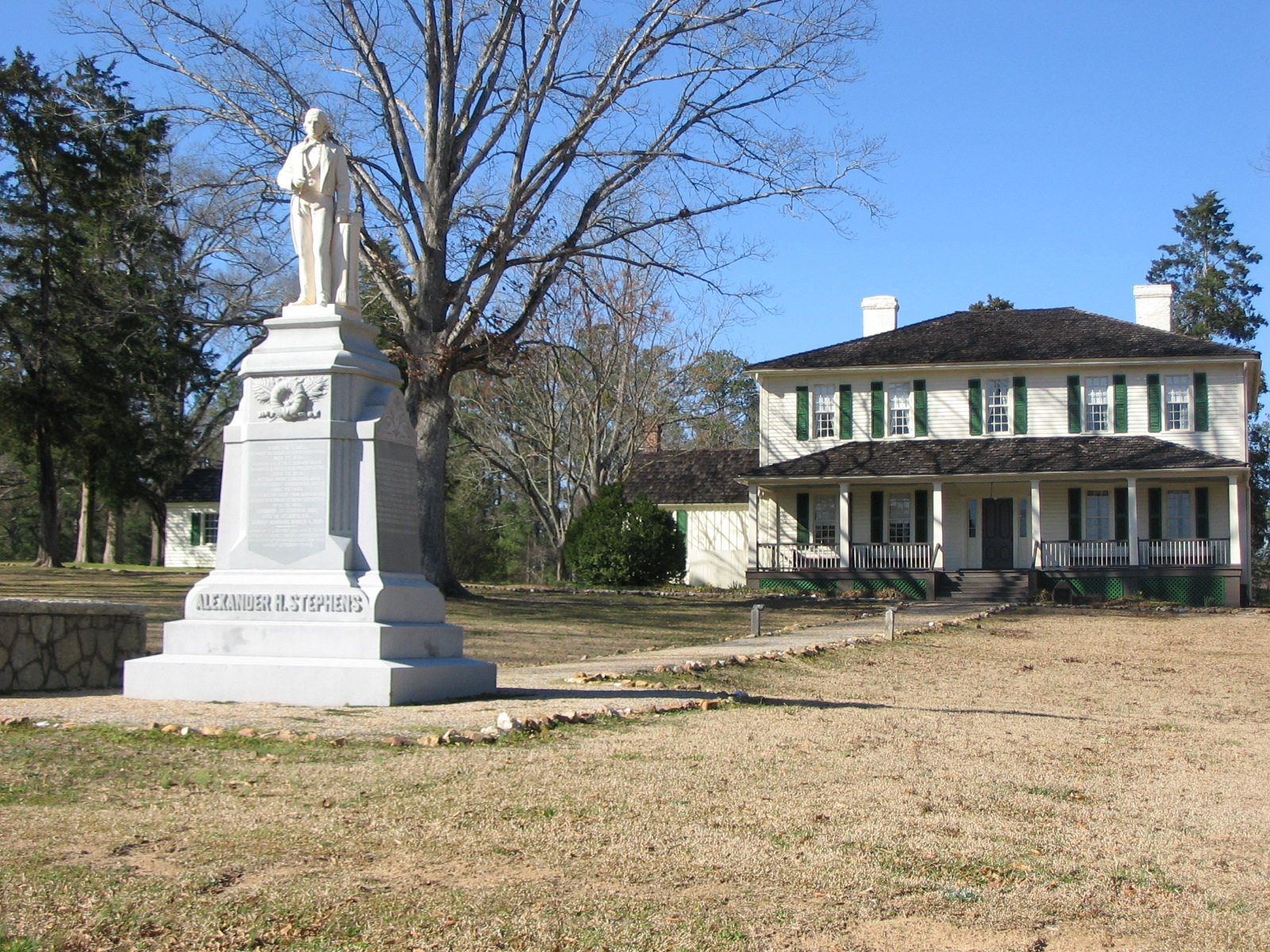
Liberty Hall in Crawfordville, Georgia

The Georgia state park system was founded in 1931. The first two areas to be designated as state parks were Indian Springs State Park and Vogel State Park. Other parks in Georgia include, but are not limited to, A.H. Stephens Historic Park in Crawfordville; Bobby Brown State Park in Elberton and Skidaway Island State Park in Savannah. In 2006, over thirteen million people visit Georgia's state parks.

=== Wildlife Management Areas ===
- List of Wildlife Management Areas in Georgia

== Biosphere Reserve ==
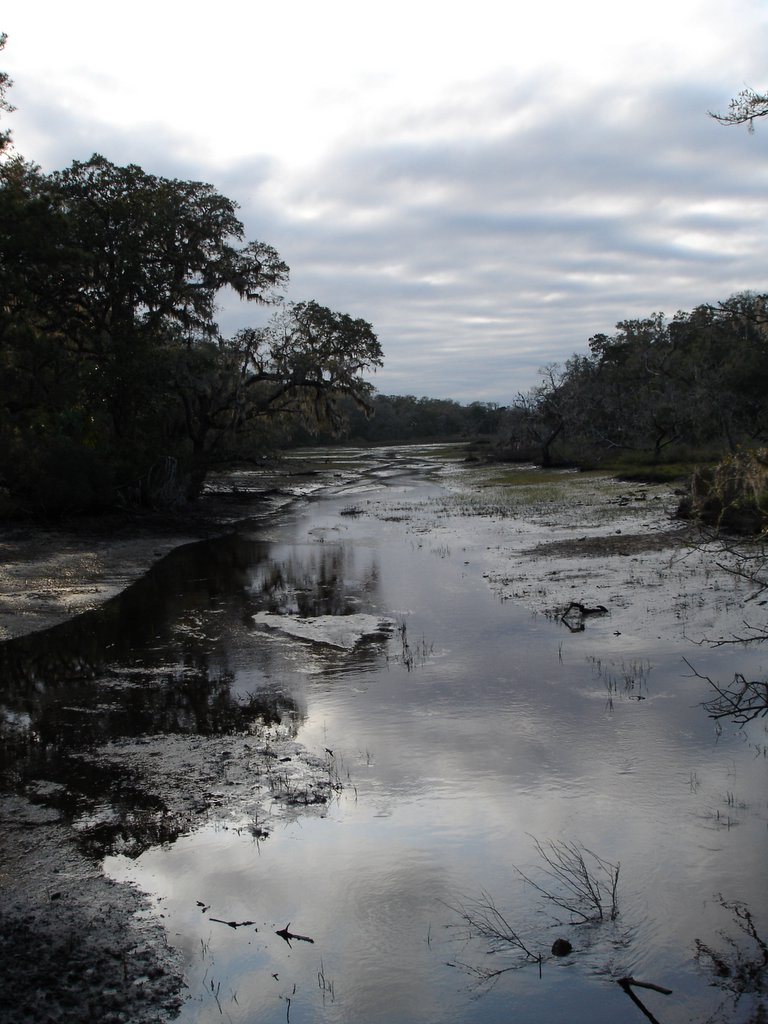
Marsh on Cumberland Island, nearby Plum Orchard

Four of Georgia's protected areas are part of the Carolinian-South Atlantic Biosphere Reserve. They are:

- Blackbeard Island National Wildlife Refuge and Wolf Island National Wildlife Refuge
- Cumberland Island National Seashore
- Gray's Reef National Marine Sanctuary
- Little St. Simon's Island

== See also ==
- Ecology of Georgia (U.S. state)
