= Fort Mountain (Murray County, Georgia) =

Mountain in Georgia, United States

Fort Mountain GA
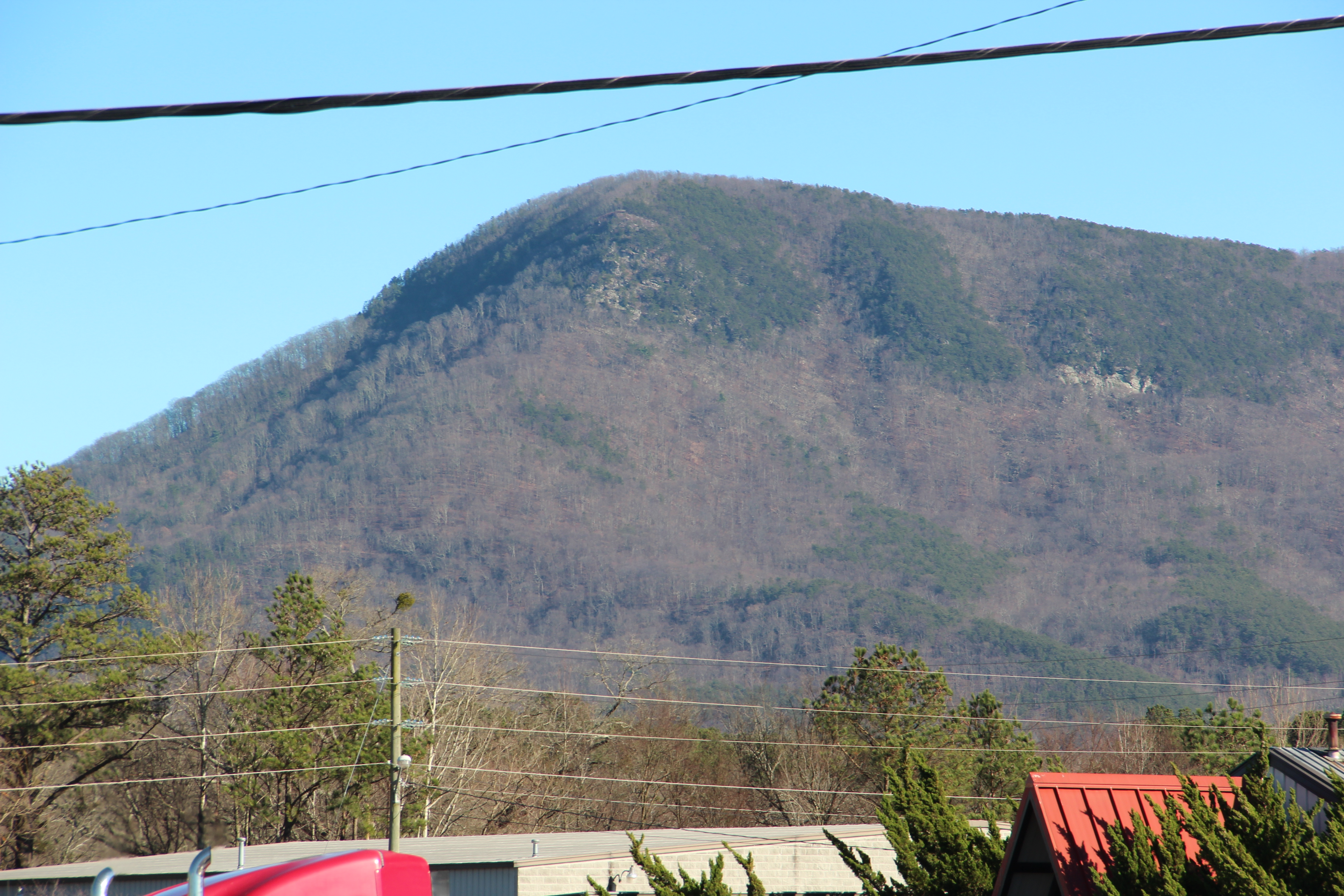
- Fort Mountain, viewed from Chatsworth

Highest point
- Elevation: 2,850 ft (870 m)
- Prominence: 321 ft (98 m)
- Coordinates: 34°46′59″N 84°42′33″W

Geography
- Location within Georgia Location within the United States
- Location: Murray County, Georgia
- Fort Mountain
- U.S. National Register of Historic Places
- U.S. National Historic Site
- Nearest city: Chatsworth, Georgia
- Area: 211.2 acres (85.5 ha)
- NRHP reference No.: 77001587
- Added to NRHP: November 23, 1977

Fort Mountain is a mountain in northern Georgia, just east of Chatsworth. It is part of the Cohutta Mountains, a small mountain range at the southern end of the Appalachian Mountains. It also lies within the Chattahoochee National Forest.

A main feature of Fort Mountain is an ancient rock formation or ruin of uncertain origin, from which the mountain takes its name. The site lies within Fort Mountain State Park and consists of a series of stone piles lying in a long uneven line that follows the contour of the mountainside. Estimates of its length vary. In a previously published archaeological report, Philip E. Smith (University Of Georgia) gives 928 feet (283 m) as its length, while the Georgia Department of Natural Resources (State Parks Division) estimates the length as 855 feet (261 m). In a book published in 1997, David Freedman, discussing this and similar walls, wrote that "Most experts believe that such wall enclosures were built during the Middle Woodland period (100 BCE-500 CE) when agriculture and food storage methods were well established. This enabled people to live a more settled existence and to devote their energies to large-scale building projects which perhaps would have taken generations to complete."

A stone fire tower, built by the Civilian Conservation Corps and located in the park, marks the summit of the mountain. A hiking path around the park leads up to a scenic overlook of Cool Springs Valley. The park also has a mountain lake, cabins, camping, and public facilities.

Two main highways cross Fort Mountain connecting the counties of Murray and Gilmer, Georgia. A steep, curving scenic route, Georgia SR 52, runs east-west between Chatsworth and Ellijay, affording views of the Cohutta Mountains; there is at least one overlook with parking. Organizations located on that route include Fort Mountain State Park and Global Youth Ministry. Southeast of Chatsworth, SR 282 crosses the mountain, running concurrently with SR 2/US 76 from Ramhurst to East Ellijay.

== History ==
The most well-known feature of Fort Mountain is the rock formation around the crest, usually mentioned as the ruins of an ancient fort or other manmade structure, consisting of stone piles without mortar. Local stories sometimes attribute its construction to the Cherokee, but published sources date its construction to a more ancient culture of indigenous people.

Georgia's Department of Natural Resources site (State Parks and Historic Sites Division) states that "The mysterious 855-foot-long wall is thought to have been built by early Indians as fortification against more hostile Indians or for ancient ceremonies." Rome News Tribune published an article by Stacy McCain in 1994, saying that anthropologists attribute the wall's construction to people of the Middle Woodland era. The site was placed on the National Register of Historic Places in 1977, for its archaeological potential as a source of information about prehistoric eras.

There are other theories as to the origin of the stone piles that comprise the wall. Stone formations may occur naturally, caused by the thrust that makes a ridge crest during the mountain's formation. In the 19th century, people speculated that Hernando de Soto built it as a fort to defend against the Creek people around 1540. In 1879 George Little, Georgia's state geologist, published a description of the state's mountains, including Fort mountain, in The Cartersville Free Press. He referred to the ruins as "fortifications erected by DeSoto and his followers as they journeyed to the Mississippi." This theory was contradicted as early as 1917, as a historian pointed out that de Soto was in the area for less than two weeks. One persistent legend attributes Fort Mountain's stone piles to a race of moon-eyed people, said to predate the Cherokee or even Native Americans as a whole. Such stories were picked up by historians and made their way into park histories, tourism brochures and markers.

== See also ==
- Fort Mountain State Park
- Old Stone Fort (Tennessee)
- Protected areas of Georgia (U.S. state)
