= Fort Mountain State Park =

State park in Georgia, United States

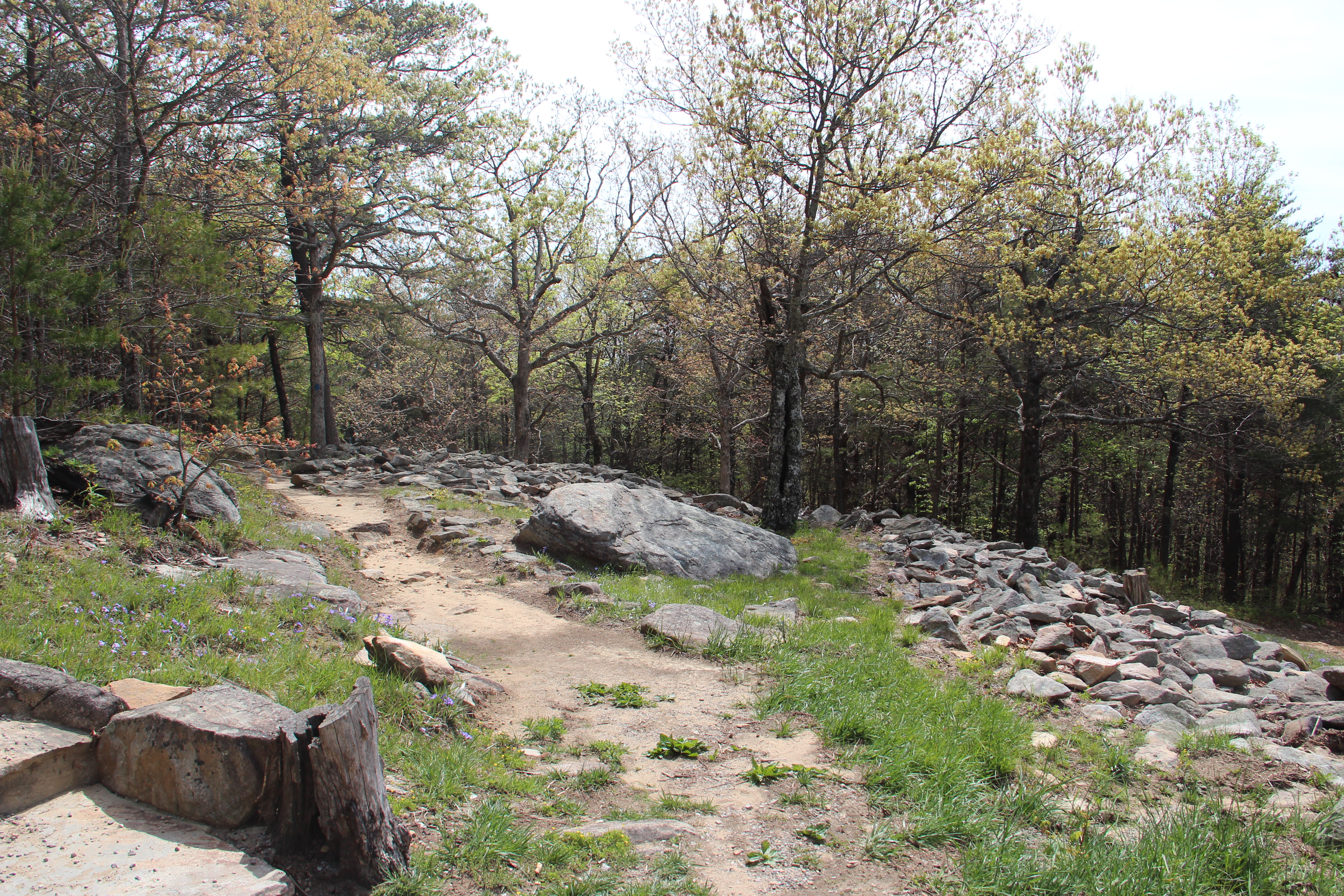
- View of the ruins

- Location within Georgia Location within the United States
- Location: Murray County, Georgia, USA
- Nearest city: Chatsworth, Georgia
- Coordinates: 34°45′39″N 84°42′26″W
- Area: 3,712 acres (15.02 km^{2})
- Governing body: Georgia State Park

Fort Mountain State Park is a 3,712-acre (15.02 km^{2}) Georgia state park located between Chatsworth and Ellijay on Fort Mountain. The state park was founded in 1938 and is named for an ancient 885-foot-long (270 m) rock wall located on the peak. The nomination form for the National Register of Historic Places describes the wall as "more of a marker than a fortification, separating the north peak from the southern end."

== History ==
Fort Mountain State Park officially opened in 1936 on land donated by Ivan Allen, Sr. The park was originally 1,930-acre (7.8 km^{2}). The Civilian Conservation Corps built many of the park's facilities, such as the stone fire tower, the lake, the trails and some park buildings. With help from state and federal funding, the park expanded its boundaries during the late 1990s to 3,712-acre (15.02 km^{2}).

=== Ancient wall ===
The state park derives its name from an ancient 885-foot-long (270 m) rock wall located on the peak. The zigzag wall contains 19 or 29 pits scattered along the wall, in addition to a ruin of a gateway. The wall was constructed out of local stones from the surrounding regions around the summit. A 1956 archaeological report concluded only that the structure "represents a prehistoric aboriginal construction whose precise age and nature cannot yet be safely hazarded until the whole problem, of which this is a representative, has been more fully investigated." In a book published in 1997, David Freedman, discussing this and similar walls, wrote that most "experts believe that such wall enclosures were built during the Middle Woodland period (100 BCE-500 CE) when agriculture and food storage methods were well established. This enabled people to live a more settled existence and to devote their energies to large-scale building projects which perhaps would have taken generations to complete."

A tourist website states that the wall was built by local Native Americans around 500 CE for religious purposes.

There are several legends concerning the wall. One legend claims that the wall is a remnant of one of the several stone forts legendary Welsh explorer Madoc and his group built throughout the present-day United States. The wall has also been related to the "moon-eyed people" of Cherokee lore. Other speculations of the wall's origins and purposes have included a fortification for Hernando de Soto's conquistadors and a honeymoon haven for Cherokee newlyweds. A plaque mentioning the Madoc/Welsh legend and the "moon-eyed Indians" was in the park, but has been removed.

== Description ==
Situated in the Chattahoochee National Forest, Fort Mountain State Park offers many outdoor activities, such as hiking, mountain biking, and horseback riding. There are more than 25 miles of trails inside the park, including paved and unpaved trails. The park is also known for its unique scenery, a mixture of both hardwood and pine forests, several blueberry thickets, and waterfalls. In addition, the park contains a 17-acre (6.9 ha) mountain lake. Atop Fort Mountain itself is a tower constructed by members of the Civilian Conservation Corps (CCC). Picnic shelters and the trails to the rock wall were also constructed by the CCC.

The summit of a different mountain in the south-southwest part of the park contains a radio tower for Georgia Public Broadcasting, transmitting TV station WCLP-TV (now WNGH-TV) since 1967; and radio station WNGH-FM since May 2008.

The park is accessible via Woody Glenn Highway (Georgia 2 and Georgia 52).

== Gallery ==
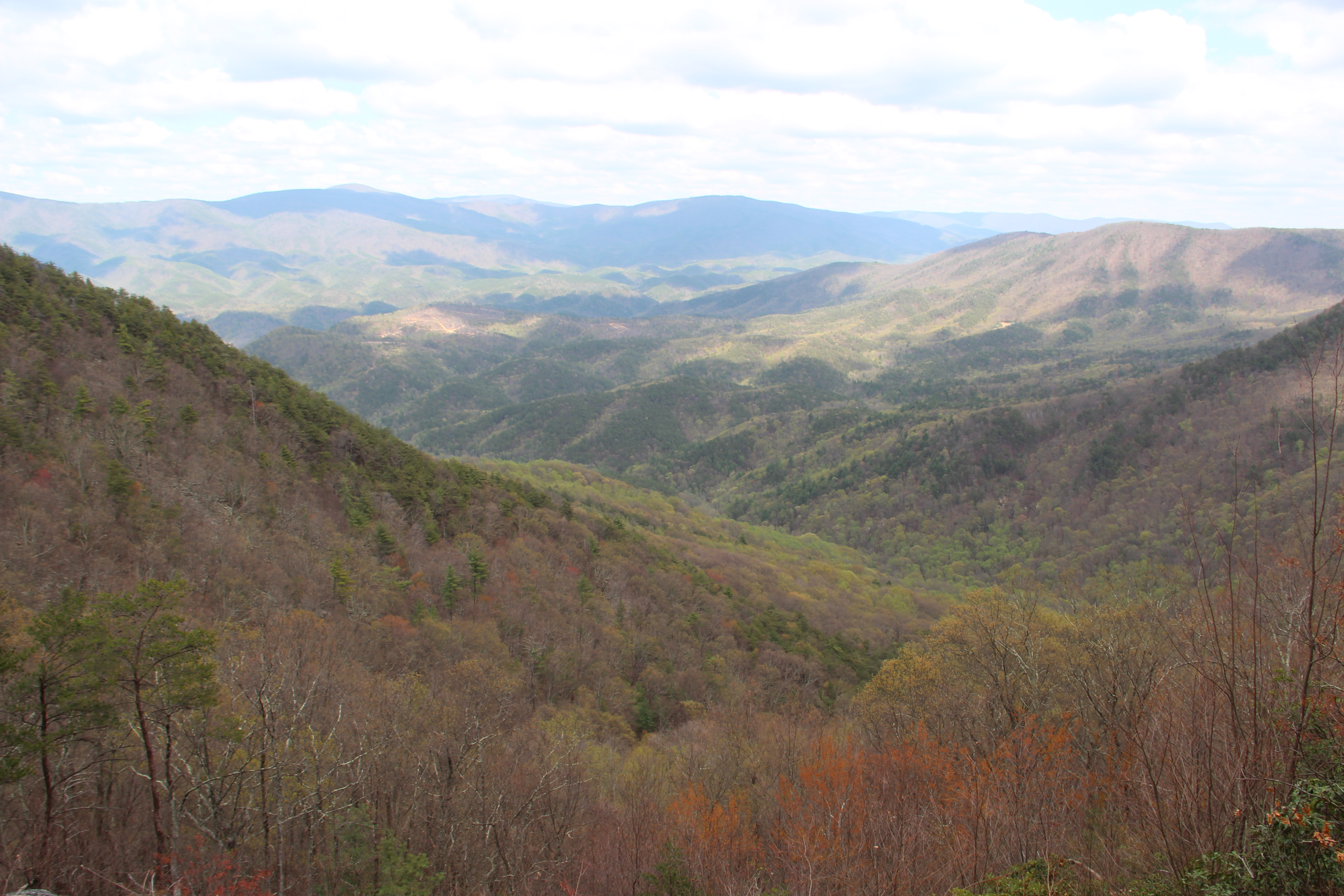
Fort Mountain overlook

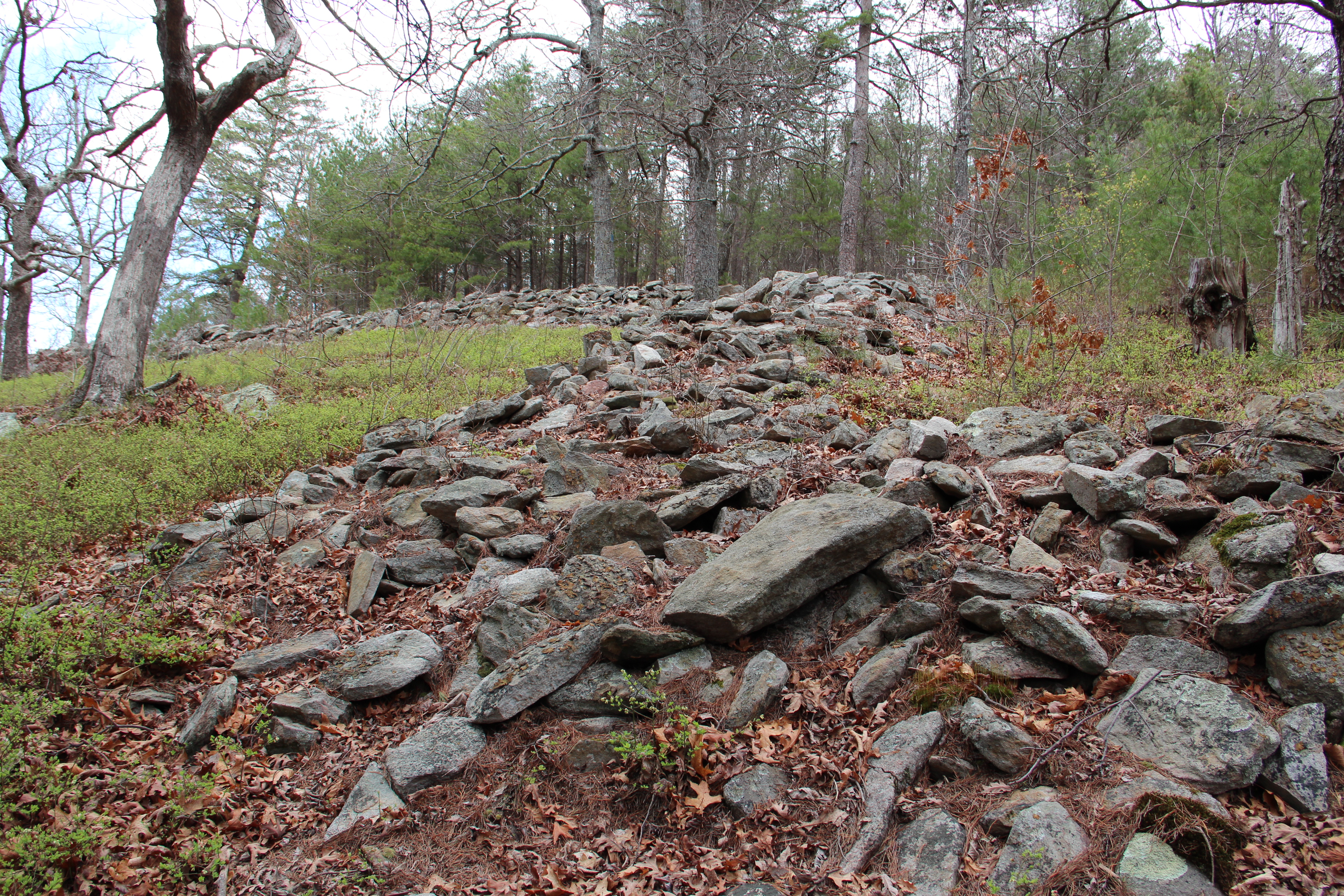
Another view of the ruins

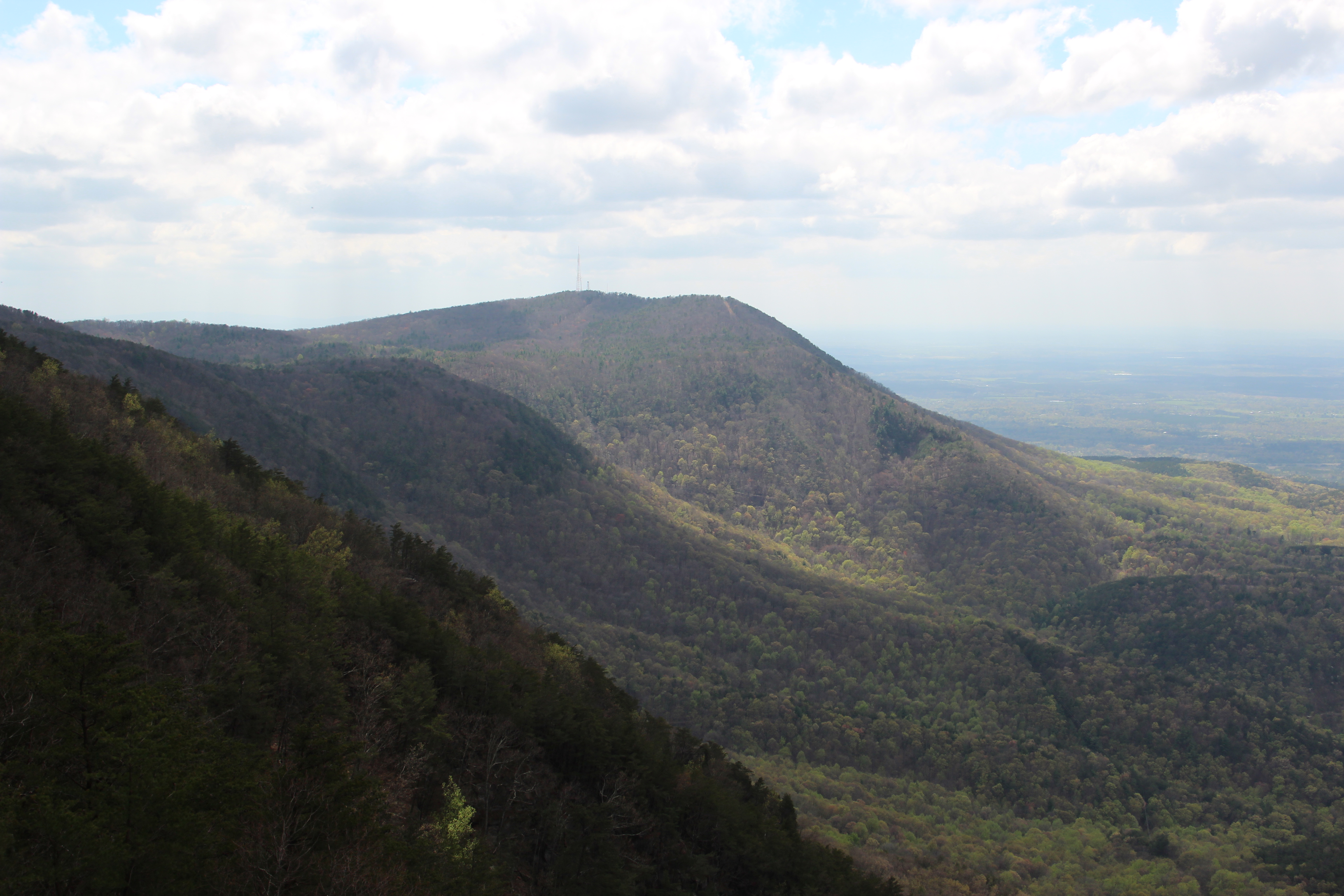
View from Fort Mountain

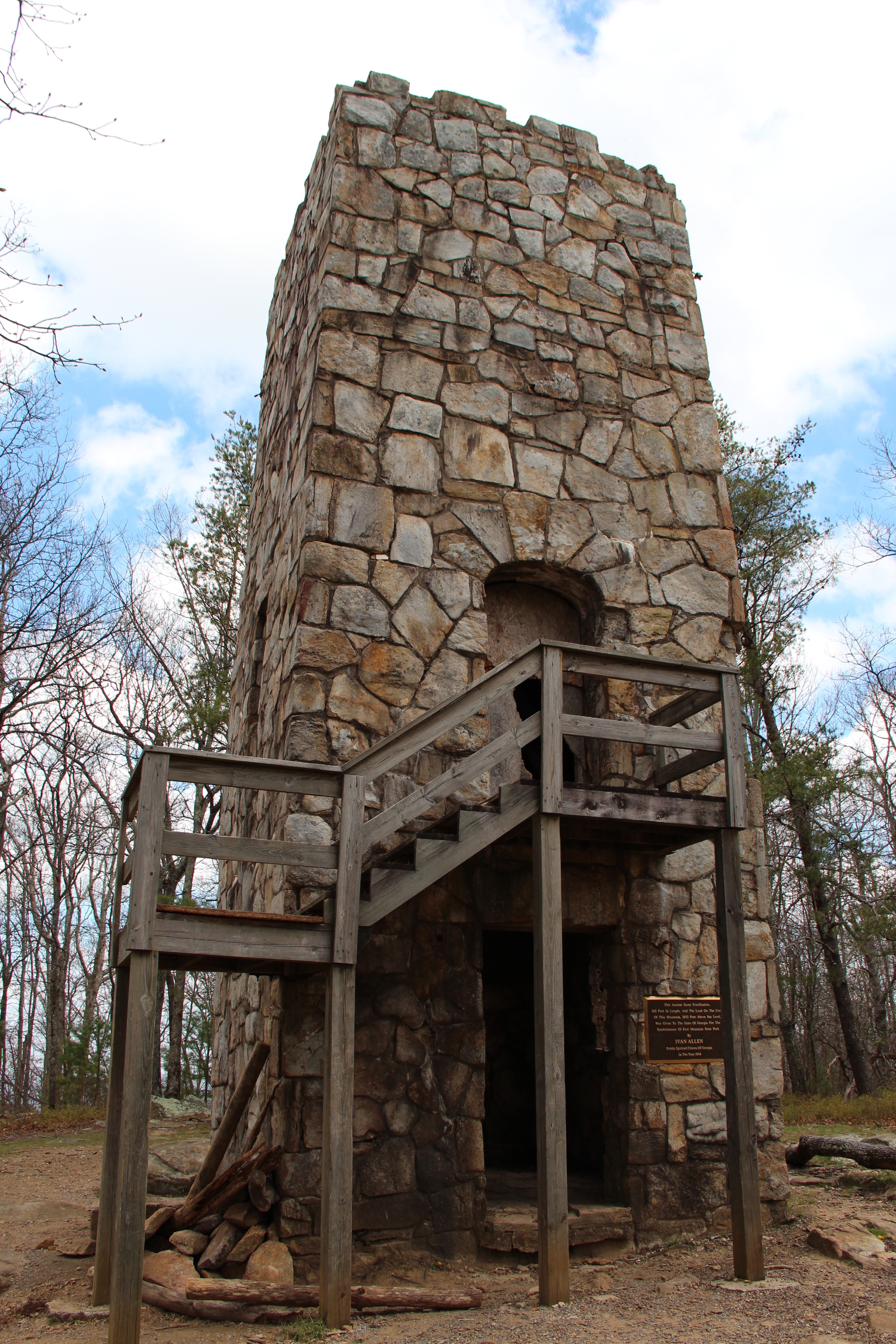
The stone tower

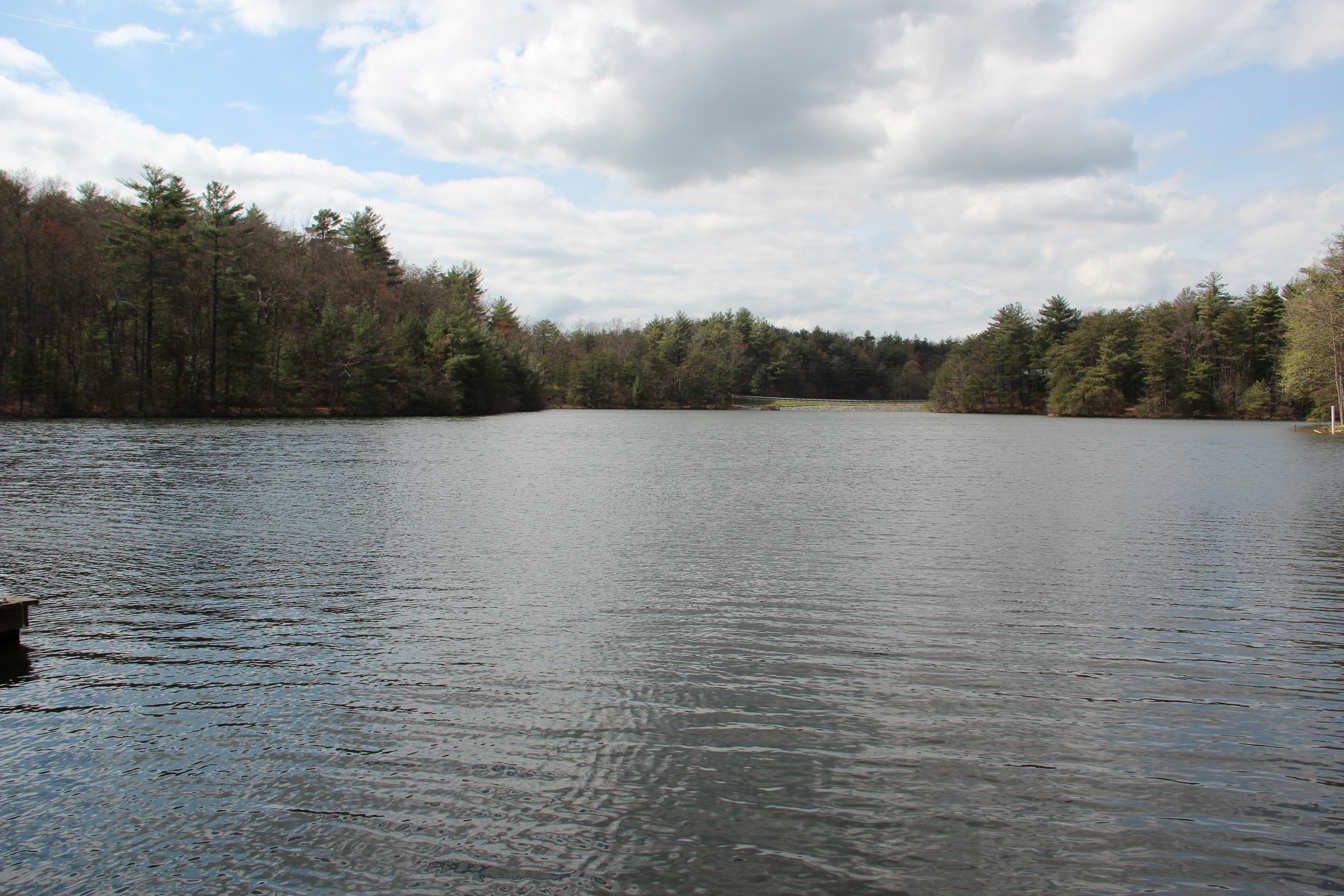
The Fort Mountain lake

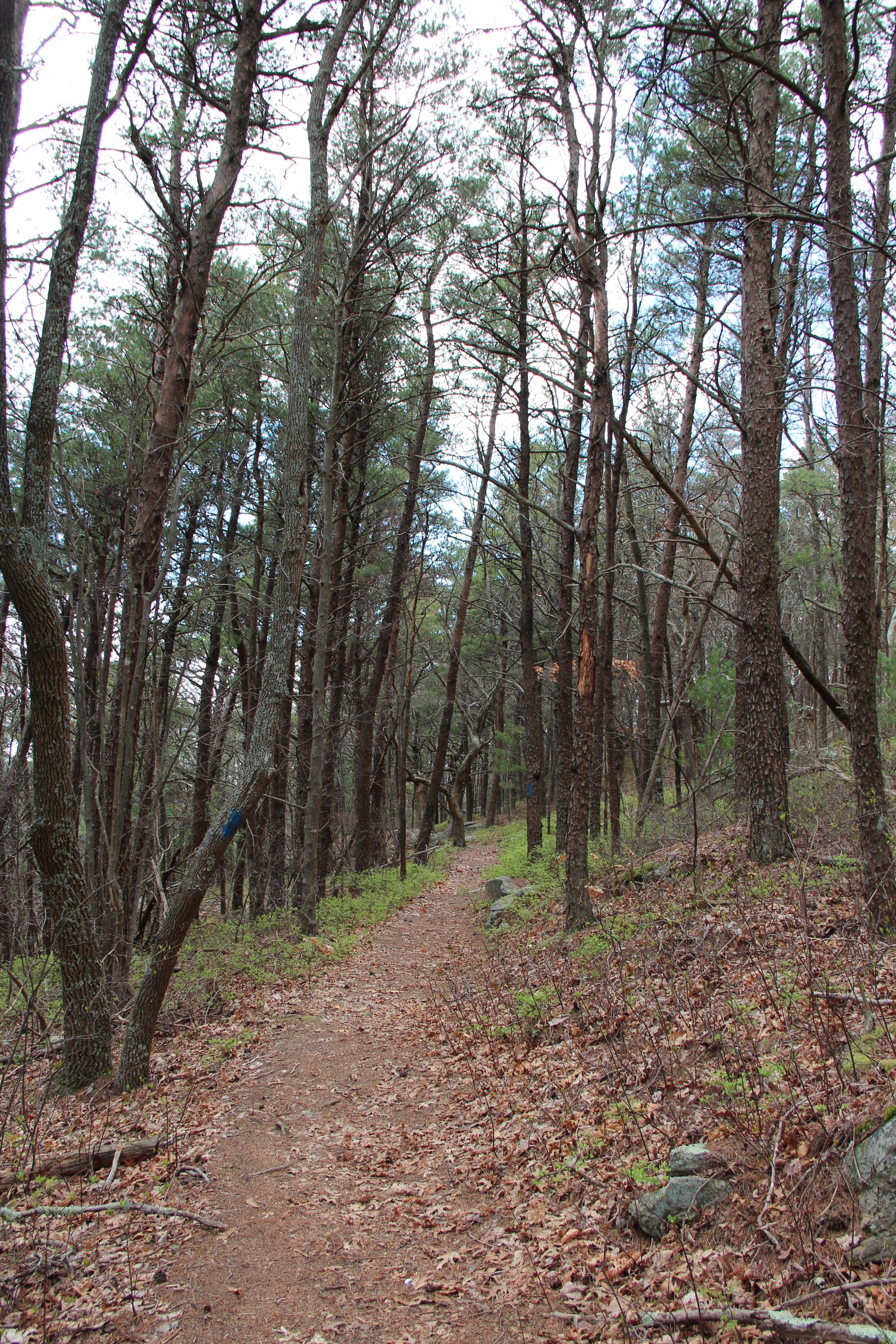
A trail inside the park
