= WNGH-FM =

- Chatsworth, Georgia; United States
- Frequency: 98.9 MHz
- Branding: GPB Radio

Programming
- Format: Public radio
- Affiliations: American Public Media, National Public Radio, Public Radio Exchange

Ownership
- Owner: Georgia Public Broadcasting; (Georgia Public Telecommunications Commission)

History
- First air date: November 13, 1976
- Former call signs: WQMT (1976–2008)
- Call sign meaning: North Georgia Highlands

Technical information
- Licensing authority: FCC
- Facility ID: 2309
- Class: C3
- ERP: 420 watts
- HAAT: 541.8 meters (1,777.6 feet)
- Transmitter coordinates: 34°45′2.3″N 84°42′52.7″W

Links
- Public license information: Public file; LMS
- Webcast: Listen Live
- Website: gpb.org/radio/

WNGH-FM (98.9 FM) is an NPR-member public radio station (via its radio network), licensed to Chatsworth, Georgia, United States. The station is currently owned by Georgia Public Broadcasting (GPB), which the station simulcasts all radio programming from. It transmits from atop a mountain in the west-southwestern part of Fort Mountain State Park (not Fort Mountain itself), having moved in May 2008 to the tower of sister television station WNGH-TV.

== History ==
The station began broadcasting as a commercial operation on November 13, 1976, and held the call sign WQMT. It was owned by Cohutta Broadcasting Company.

On December 21, 2007, then-owners North Georgia Radio Group entered into an agreement to sell the station, still known as WQMT, to the Foundation For Public Broadcasting In Georgia, Inc., which shares the same street address as the GPB headquarters in Atlanta. The sale was approved by the Federal Communications Commission (FCC) on April 9, 2008. Pending the sale, GPB reserved the call sign WNGH-FM for the station, to be assigned upon consummation. GPB also chose to change the callsign of WCLP-TV to WNGH-TV. The station switched from its previous classic country format (branded as "Georgia 99") to GPB programming on January 2, 2008, and later moved to the WNGH-TV tower around May 2008.

Despite broadcasting at a relatively modest 420 watts, WNGH-FM provides city-grade coverage to much of far northern Georgia, including Dalton, and provides secondary coverage to much of the Chattanooga, Tennessee area, including much of Chattanooga itself. This is because its transmitter is located 1,778 feet above average terrain.

Effective June 30, 2016, the Foundation For Public Broadcasting in Georgia donated WNGH-FM to the Georgia Public Telecommunications Commission, the state entity that supervises GPB, making GPB the direct licensee.
