= Egg Island (Georgia) =

Island in Georgia, United States

- Location within Georgia Location within the United States
- Interactive map of Egg Island

Geography
- Location: McIntosh County, Georgia
- Coordinates: 31°18′17″N 81°18′05″W
- Highest elevation: 3 ft (0.9 m)

Administration
- United States

Egg Island is an island in the U.S. state of Georgia. It is located at the mouth of the Altamaha River, bordering the Atlantic Ocean. Egg Island is part of the Wolf Island National Wildlife Refuge.

Egg Island was so named for the many eggs left on the beaches by sea birds.
