= List of Wildlife Management Areas in Georgia =

The following is a list of Wildlife Management Areas (WMA) in the U.S. state of Georgia.

== Wildlife Management Areas ==
- Alapaha River WMA: 6,870 acres (2,780 ha) located southwest of Ocilla in Irwin County.
- Albany Nursery WMA: 300 acres (120 ha) located in Dougherty County.
- Alexander WMA: Established in 1996 the WMA is 1,300 acres (530 ha), with 20 acres (8.1 ha) of dove fields, located near Waynesboro in Burke County.
- Allatoona WMA: 6,818-acre located near White, in Bartow County.
- Alligator Creek WMA: 3,086 acres (1,249 ha) located near the confluence of the Little Ocmulgee River and Alligator Creek, two miles from Lumber City
- Altama Plantation WMA: 3,986 acres (1,613 ha) in Glynn County
- Altamaha WMA:
- Appling County Dove Field:
- Arrowhead WMA:
- B.F. Grant WMA:
- Ball's Ferry:
- Bartram Forest WMA:
- Beaverdam WMA:
- Berry College WMA:
- Big Dukes Pond WMA:
- Big Hammock WMA:
- Big Lazer Creek WMA:
- Blanton Creek WMA:
- Blue Ridge WMA:
- Broad River WMA:
- Buck Shoals WMA:
- Buford Trout Hatchery:
- Bullard Creek WMA:
- Thunder Camp Voluntary Public Access (VPA):
- Canoochee Sandhills WMA:
- Carter's Lake WMA:
- Cedar Creek WMA:
- Cedar Grove VPA:
- Ceylon WMA:
- Chattahoochee Fall Line WMA: Almo Tract:
- Chattahoochee Fall Line WMA: Blackjack Crossing Area:
- Chattahoochee Fall Line WMA: Fort Perry Tract:
- Chattahoochee Fall Line WMA: Hilliard Plantation Tract:
- Chattahoochee Fall Line WMA: VPA Tracts:
- Chattahoochee WMA:
- Chestatee WMA:
- Chickasawhatchee WMA:
- Clarks Hill-East:
- Clarks Hill-West:
- Clayhole Swamp WMA:
- Clybel WMA:
- Cochrans Creek WMA:
- Cohutta WMA:
- Collins Road VPA:
- Conasauga River WMA:
- Cooper's Creek WMA:
- Coosawattee WMA:
- Crockford-Pigeon Mountain WMA:
- Dawson Forest WMA:
- Di-Lane WMA: 8,100 acres (3,300 ha) with 200 acres (81 ha) of dove fields
- Dixon Bay WMA:
- Dixon Memorial WMA:
- Doerun Pitcherplant Bog WMA: 600 acres (240 ha)
- Echeconnee Creek WMA:
- Elbert County WMA:
- Elmodel WMA:
- Fishing Creek WMA: 2,900 acres (1,200 ha) in Tignall
- Flat Tub WMA: 7,141 acres (2,890 ha). The Ocmulgee River runs along almost the entire northern boundary.
- Flint River WMA: 2,300 acres (930 ha) in Dooly County. The Flint River forms part of the southwest boundary.
- Gaither WMA:
- Germany Creek WMA: 1,200 acres (490 ha) in McDuffie County
- Grand Bay WMA:
- Griffin Ridge WMA:
- Hannahatchee Creek WMA:
- Hart County WMA:
- Hiltonia WMA:
- Horse Creek WMA:
- Indian Ford Farms Dove Field:
- J.L. Lester WMA:
- Joe Kurz WMA:
- John's Mountain WMA:
- Keg Creek WMA:
- Lake Russell WMA:
- Lake Seminole WMA:
- Lake Walter F. George WMA:
- Lanahassee Creek WMA:
- Little River WMA:
- Little Satilla WMA:
- Lola Tract VPA:
- London Farms Dove Field:
- Lower Broad River WMA:
- Lula Bridge WMA:
- Mayhaw WMA:
- McEntire Road VPA:
- McGraw Ford WMA:
- Mead Farm WMA: Smallest WMA established in 2003
- Montezuma Bluffs WMA:
- Moody Forest WMA:
- Morgan Lake WMA:
- Oaky Woods WMA:
- Ocmulgee WMA:
- Oconee WMA:
- Ohoopee Dunes WMA:
- Oliver Bridge WMA:
- Ossabaw Island WMA: 9,000 acres (3,600 ha) in Chatham County
- Otting WMA:
- Paulding Forest WMA:
- Paulks Pasture WMA:
- Penholoway Swamp WMA:
- Perry Dove Field:
- Phinizy Swamp WMA:
- Pleasant Valley VPA:
- Rayonier Corridor Lands WM:
- Redlands WMA:
- Rich Mountain WMA:
- Rich Mountain WMA Cartecay Tract:
- Richmond Hill WMA:
- River Bend WMA:
- River Creek, The Rolf & Alexandra Kauka WMA:
- Rogers WMA:
- Rum Creek WMA:
- Sandhills WMA: East:
- Sandhills WMA: West:
- Sansavilla WMA:
- Sapelo Island WMA:
- Scotland Road VPA:
- Sheffield WMA:
- Silver Lake WMA:
- Soap Creek WMA:
- Sparks Cut Off VPA:
- Spirit Creek Forest WMA:
- Sprewell Bluff WMA: East:
- Swallow Creek WMA:
- Tallapoosa River WMA:
- Tallulah Gorge WMA:
- Townsend WMA:
- Treat Mountain WMA:
- Tuckahoe WMA:
- Walton WMA:
- Warwoman WMA:
- West Point WMA:
- Wilson Shoals WMA:
- Yuchi WMA: 7,800 acres (3,200 ha) including 40 acres (16 ha) of dove fields.
- Zahnd WMA: 1,642 acres (664 ha) in Walker County.
