= Moon-eyed people =

Cherokee legend

The moon-eyed people are a legendary group of short, bearded white-skinned people who are said to have lived in Appalachia until the Cherokee expelled them. Stories about them, attributed to Cherokee tradition, are mentioned by early European settlers in America. In a 1797 book, Benjamin Smith Barton explains they are called "moon-eyed" because they saw poorly during the day. Some stories claim they created the area's pre-Columbian ruins, and they disappeared from the area. Barton cited as his source a conversation with Colonel Leonard Marbury (c. 1749 – 1796), an early settler of Georgia. Marbury, a Revolutionary War officer and a Congressman in the Second Provincial Congress of Georgia (1775), acted as intermediary between Native American Indians in the state of Georgia and the United States government.

== Description ==
Published accounts of an ancient moon-eyed people who lived in the southern Appalachian region of the United States before the Cherokee came into the area have appeared in America since the late 18th century. Sources disagree as to the accuracy of the stories, whether or not the stories are an authentic part of Cherokee oral tradition; whether the people existed or were mythical; whether they were indigenous peoples or early European explorers; and whether or not they built certain prehistoric structures found in the region.

Different ideas about the people have appeared in letters, newspapers, and books for over two hundred years. Stories about the era before widespread European settlement were published by early European settlers of America, who became interested in the native people and old ruins in America. Among the earliest people to mention the legend are Benjamin Smith Barton, who wrote that he had heard a story from Leonard Marbury, about ancient moon-eyed people; and John Sevier, who told of an ancient white race, according to later published sources who mention Sevier's letters. Barton, Marbury, and Sevier lived during the era when the lower Appalachians were still part of the Cherokee Nation, before the Trail of Tears. Later human-interest articles mention Barton.

== Background ==
There are a few published accounts about moon-eyed people during the century following the Cherokee Removal. One book by William Mooney appeared in 1902. Human-interest stories in The Chattanooga News in 1923 mentioned the legend of moon-eyed people.

The Georgia Parks Division of the Department of Natural Resources, has a marker at Fort Mountain that mentions legends about the wall's origin. Of the moon-eyed people, the plaque says, "These people are said to have been unable to see during certain phases of the moon. During one of these phases, the Creek people annihilated the race. Some believe the moon-eyed people built the fortifications on this mountain."

Today, there are differing published opinions about the moon-eyed people as to whether they were real people of prehistoric times or mythical people from folklore, whether "moon-eyed" means they had eyes like moons or were called moon-eyed because they could see better at night, whether they are indigenous peoples or of European origin.

== Fort Mountain State Park ==
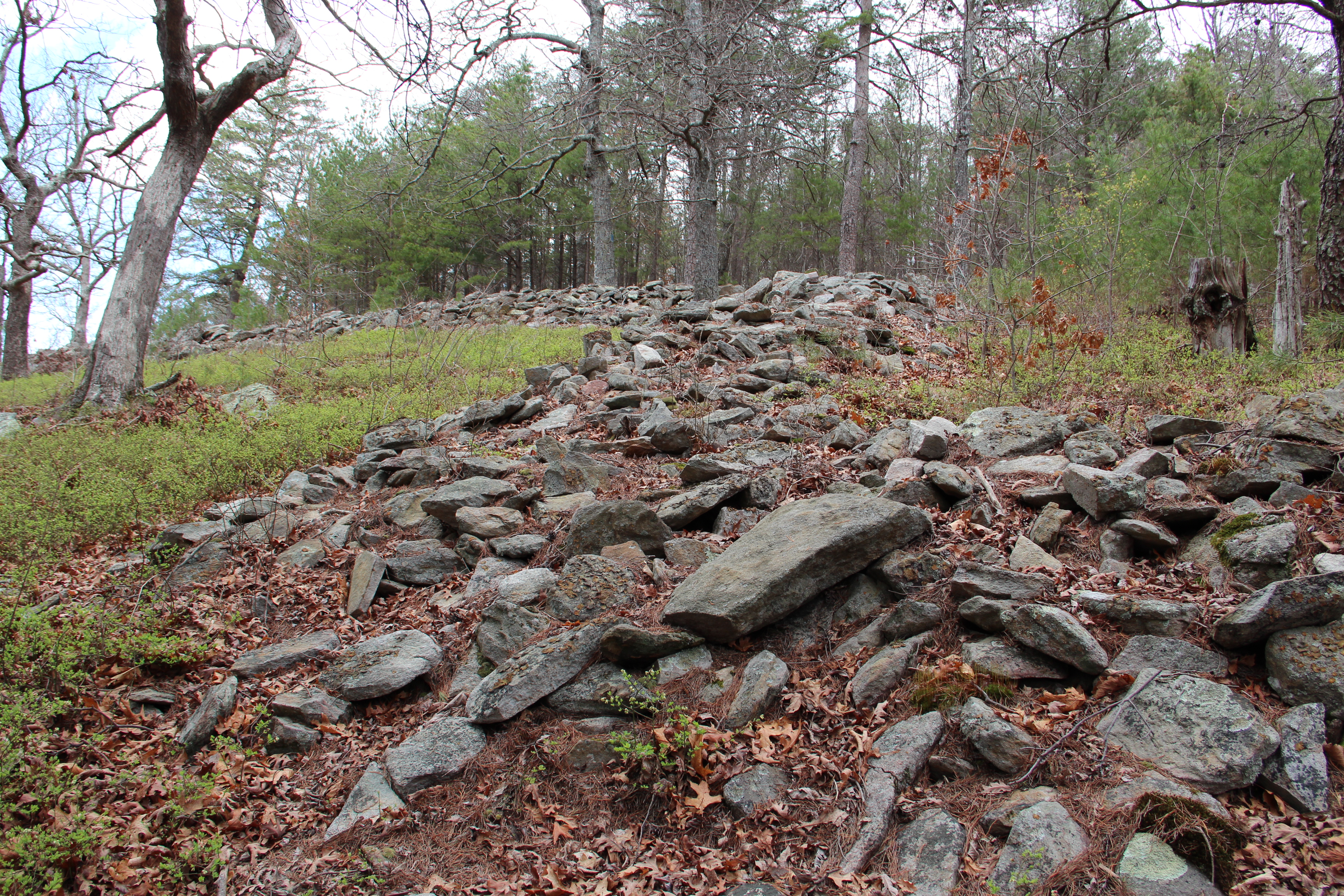
Fort Mountain wall ruins

The Moon-eyed people are noted in a 1968 historical marker in Fort Mountain State Park, Chatsworth, Georgia. Stories of the people appear in park guides and news articles of that era, in speculations about the origin of the wall.

== Early sources ==
One early source about the time before the Cherokee removal is an account by early Tennessee governor, John Sevier. Sevier lived at a time when North Georgia and other parts of the Appalachians were still part of the Cherokee Nation. Between 1800 and 1805, he was involved with treaties that later led to the Cherokee Removal.

According to a 1969 newspaper article in Forsyth County News (Georgia), Sevier visited Fort Mountain in 1782. The article cites John Sevier (from a letter, date unspecified) as saying that "Chief Oconostota of the Cherokees, then 90 years old," had told Sevier that his own forefathers "told of the fort being built by white men from across the great water." Chief Oconostota died in 1783, which would have been in the year following Sevier's visit.

Benjamin Smith Barton, author of New Views of the Origin of the Tribes and Nations of America (1797), describes an ancient people who were "moon-eyed." Barton, citing Colonel Leonard Marbury (an intermediary between the government and the Cherokee), writes, "the Cheerake tell us, that when they first arrived in the country which they inhabit, they found it possessed by certain 'moon-eyed-people,' who could not see in the day-time. These wretches they expelled." A 1923 article in The Chattanooga News mentions a 1797 book by Barton and repeats the Cherokee legend about moon-eyed people. The article says of Barton, "He seems to consider them an albino race."

In his book, Barton infers that the moon-eyed people were ancestors of albinos encountered by Lionel Wafer, a Welsh explorer of the early 18th century. According to Barton, Wafer lived for a time among the Guna people of Panama, called "moon-eyed" because they could see better at night than day.

Two early histories published after Barton's work mention the term "moon-eyed people". Both Ezekial Sanford's History of the United States Before the Revolution and B. R. Carroll's Historical Collections of South Carolina cite James Adair, in attributing the term "moon-eyed people" to Cherokee tradition. Stories about the people appeared in descriptions of historic sites and parks in the 20th century.

Another writer, James Mooney links Barton's "moon-eyed people" story to several similar accounts. His 1902 book, Myths of the Cherokee, cites an earlier historian John Haywood. Mooney quotes Haywood's 1823 The Natural and Aboriginal History of Tennessee, as telling of "white people, who were extirpated in part, and in part were driven from Kentucky, and probably also from West Tennessee." Mooney attributes this to Indian tradition.

According to Mooney, Haywood says that in the 17th century the Cherokee encountered "white people" on the Little Tennessee River, and describes fortifications left by the French that were surrounded by "hoes, axes, guns, and other metallic utensils", adding that the Cherokee found no aboriginals when they arrived.

Mooney cites two further independent accounts from Cherokee individuals of his time, of a people who lived north of the Hiwassee River when the Cherokee arrived there, and then went west; one of these describes them as a "very small people, perfectly white".

== Theories ==
In revisiting the old stories, authors who have written of moon-eyed people from Cherokee lore have speculated on the origin of the legend and the moon-eyed people.

Welsh historian Gwynn Williams, citing John Sevier's story of Oconostota as it relates to whites having built the ancient structures, notes it is "a beautiful example of the way minds were working in the late eighteenth century – and of the power of suggestion which white minds could exercise over red.".

Some accounts about the moon-eyed people have become inseparable from a Welsh explorer named Madoc. A 2008 article in the Athens Banner-Herald, "Mystery surrounds North Georgia ruins" by Walter Putnam, describes the ruins at Fort Mountain and wrote that "Cherokee legend attributes the wall to a mysterious band of 'moon-eyed people' led by a Welsh prince named Madoc who appeared in the area more than 300 years before Columbus sailed to America. A plaque at the wall says matter-of-factly it was built by Madoc...."

An article by Rome News-Tribune reporter Stacy McCain, published in the Rome Tribune in 2008, says that it was an early Philadelphia author who first suggested that the "moon-eyed people" were white. He says that the Cherokee legend, before then, did not mention color. McCain also points out that the Philadelphia piece, published in 1797, was picked up in 1823 by another author, who wrote of violent conflict between the Cherokee and some blond, blue-eyed, fair skinned inhabitants; park literature had attributed that legend to Cherokee chiefs. McCain writes, "Apparently Tennessee historian John Haywood qualifies as an 'ancient tribal chief,' since it was his 1823 book that first told of Cherokees slaughtering 'prehistoric white people'—though Heywood [sic] had apparently never heard of Fort Mountain." He says that the plaques date to 1968.

== Similar legends ==
In addition to legends of moon-eyed people of the eastern-appalachian region, there are legends of moon-eyed people that relate to other regions, or to cultures besides the Cherokee.

There is a mention of moon-eyed people from Cherokee legends of Ohio. Author Barbara Alice Mann, who identifies herself as Ohio Bear Clan Seneca, suggests that a "moon-eyed people" of Cherokee tradition were Adena culture people from Ohio who merged with the Cherokees around 200 BCE.

A 1914 book by Charles Loftus Grant Anderson, Old Panama and Castilla Del Oro, describes a race of moon-eyed people who were described by Lionel Wafer.

== General sources ==
- Abramson, Rudy (2006). Encyclopedia of Appalachia. University of Tennessee Press. ISBN 978-1-57233-456-4.
- Mooney, James (1902). Myths of the Cherokee. Washington, D.C.: Government Printing Office. pp. 22–3. at Internet Archive
- Tibbs, David (2008). "Legends of Fort Mountain: The Moon-Eyed People / Prince Madoc of Wales". Historical Marker Database.
