= Wolf Island National Wildlife Refuge =

Protected area in Georgia, United States

- IUCN category Ib (wilderness area)
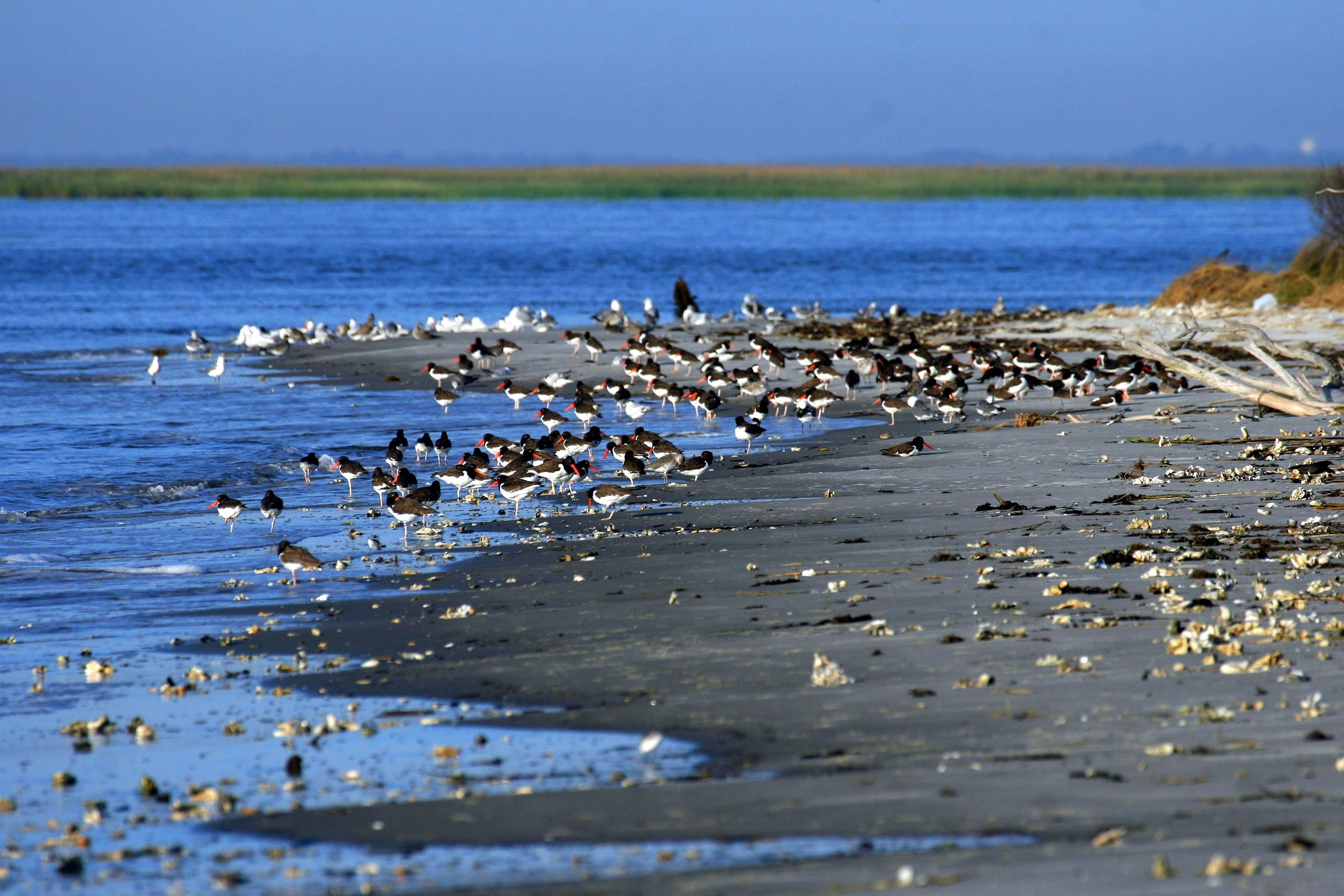
- American oystercatchers at Wolf Island National Wildlife Refuge, February 2014

- Location within Georgia Location within the United States
- Interactive map of Wolf Island National Wildlife Refuge
- Location: McIntosh County, Georgia, United States
- Nearest city: Darien, Georgia
- Coordinates: 31.34411°N 81.28426°W
- Area: 5,126 acres (20.74 km^{2})
- Established: 1930
- Governing body: U.S. Fish and Wildlife Service
- Website: Wolf Island National Wildlife Refuge

Wolf Island National Wildlife Refuge, located approximately 12 miles (19 km) off the coast of Darien, Georgia, in McIntosh County, was established on April 3, 1930 to provide protection and habitat for migratory birds. The barrier island refuge consists of Wolf Island and two smaller islands, Egg and Little Egg. Over 75% of the refuge's 5,126 acres (20.74 km^{2}) are composed of saltwater marsh.

Wolf Island NWR was designated a Wilderness Area in 1975 and is maintained as such, with its primary purpose being to provide protection for migratory birds and such endangered and threatened species as the loggerhead sea turtle and piping plover. Due to its status as a wilderness area, no public use facilities are planned on the refuge. The refuge's salt waters are open to a variety of recreational activities such as fishing and crabbing, but all beach, marsh, and upland areas are closed to the public.
