= Edna Township, Barnes County, North Dakota =

Edna Township
- Township
- Location of Edna Township
- Coordinates: 47°06′23″N 098°15′56″W
- Country: United States
- State: North Dakota
- County: Barnes County
- Named for: Edna Booth

Government
  - Type: Township Board
  - Chairman: Shawn Anderson

Area
  - Total: 35.83 sq mi (92.8 km^{2})
  - Land: 34.50 sq mi (89.4 km^{2})
  - Water: 1.33 sq mi (3.4 km^{2})
- Elevation: 1,430 ft (440 m)

Population (2000)
  - Total: 74
  - Density: 2.1/sq mi (0.81/km^{2})
- Time zone: UTC-6 (Central (MST))
  - Summer (DST): UTC-5 (CDT)
- Area code: 701
- FIPS code: 38-22460
- GNIS feature ID: 1036432

Edna Township is a civil township in Barnes County in the U.S. state of North Dakota. As of the 2000 Census, its population was 74. It is the 20th largest township in the county in terms of both total population and population density.

== History ==
The township is named after Edna Booth, daughter of Albert Anson Booth (1850 – 1914), a pioneer who settled in Barnes County in 1879. Booth established a rural post office out of his home on July 25, 1882. He originally planned to name it after his daughter, who was the first white child born in the township, but instead named it Booth. Service was discontinued on November 14, 1884. However, the township retains the name.

The Booth post office was located approximately 1 mile from the present city of Rogers (47°06′08″N 98°12′54″W).

== Geography ==
Edna Township is located in northwest Barnes County between the cities of Wimbledon and Rogers. According to the United States Census Bureau, the township has a total area of 44.77 square miles (116.0 km^{2}), and is the 28th township in the county in terms of area, while 96% of the township is land.

The township lies in survey township T142N R60W. North Dakota Highway 9 runs through the southern part of the township.

=== Natural Features ===
- Orner Slough (47°06′58″N 98°14′50″W)
- Ray Holland Marsh Wildlife Management Area

=== Adjacent townships/areas ===
- Lake Town Township (north)
- Rogers Township (east)
- Anderson Township (south)
- Uxbridge Township (west)

=== Cities and populated places ===
- Leal
