= Wimbledon, North Dakota =

- City
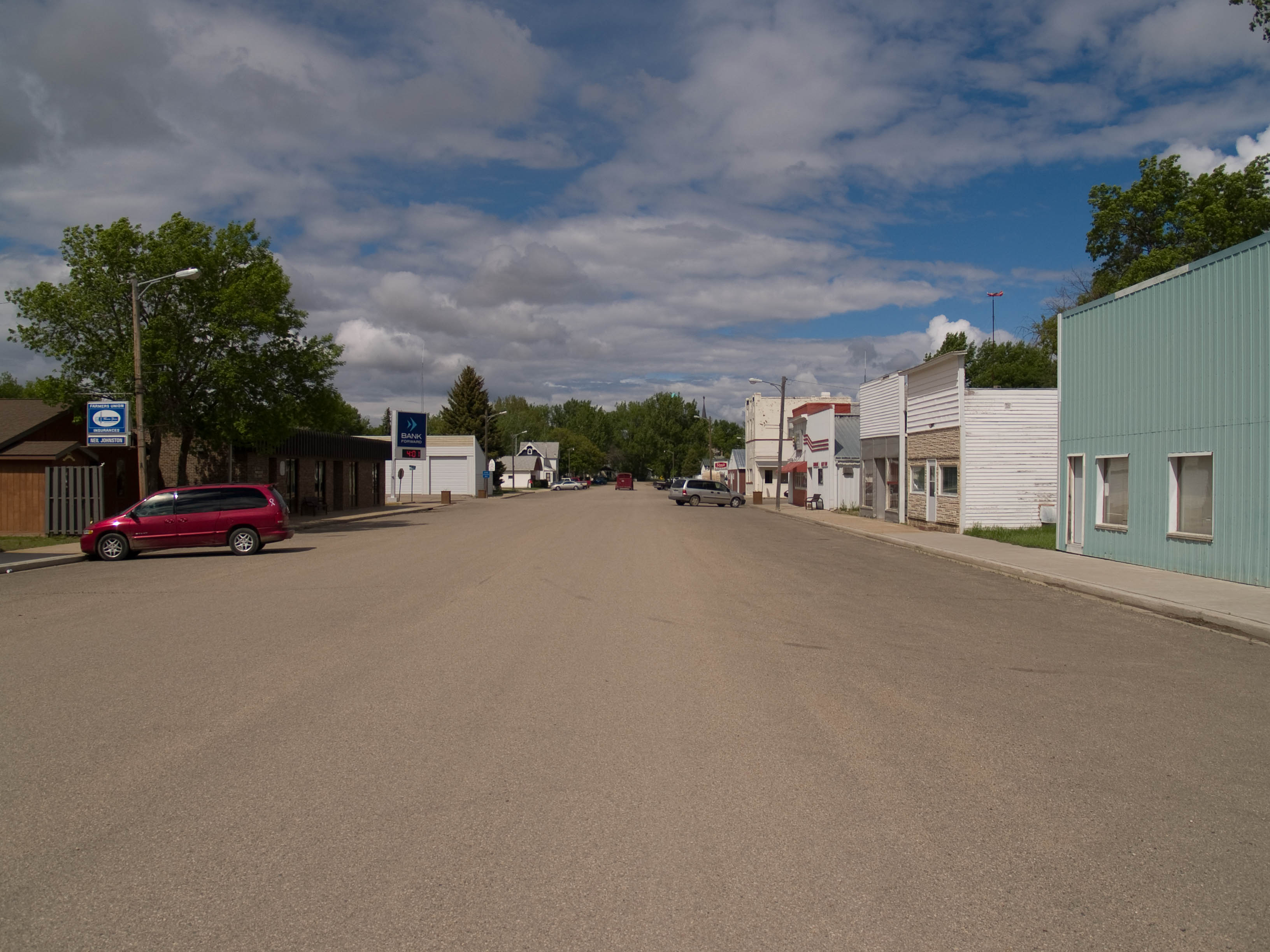
- 3rd Avenue in Wimbledon, looking north-east.

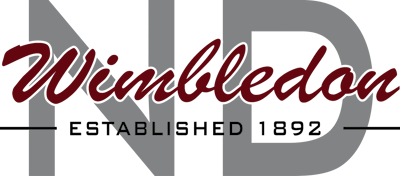
- Logo

- Location of Wimbledon, North Dakota
- Coordinates: 47°10′14″N 98°27′36″W
- Country: United States
- State: North Dakota
- County: Barnes
- Founded: 1892

Government
  - Mayor: Roger Pickar

Area
  - Total: 0.62 sq mi (1.61 km^{2})
  - Land: 0.62 sq mi (1.61 km^{2})
  - Water: 0 sq mi (0.00 km^{2})
- Elevation: 1,490 ft (454 m)

Population (2020)
  - Total: 178
  - Estimate (2022): 178
  - Density: 286.3/sq mi (110.54/km^{2})
- Time zone: UTC-6 (Central (CST))
  - Summer (DST): UTC-5 (CDT)
- ZIP code: 58492
- Area code: 701
- FIPS code: 38-86620
- GNIS feature ID: 1032841
- Website: wimbledonnd.com

Wimbledon is a city in Pierce Township, Barnes County, North Dakota, United States. The population was 178 at the 2020 census.

== Geography ==
Wimbledon is located at 47°10′14″N 98°27′36″W (47.170662, -98.459941).

According to the United States Census Bureau, the city has a total area of 0.53 square miles (1.37 km^{2}), all land.

The city is in the south-west corner of the township, adjacent to the border with Stutsman County. (In North Dakota, the term township refers to a six-mile square unit of territory, not to a particular settlement.)

No major highways pass through or near Wimbledon, which is just off State Route 9 from Melville to Rogers.

The nearest large settlement (by North Dakota standards) is Jamestown to the south-west, followed by Valley City to the south-east, which is the county seat.

== History ==
=== Foundation ===
Wimbledon was founded in 1892. It was named for Wimbledon, London, which featured in the ancestry of John Henry Gibson, who homesteaded the land the town was built on.

Gibson was born in 1844 of farming stock at East Wallingford, Vermont, but went West as a young man and obtained title to 149 acres (60 hectares) of the local prairie in 1889. He registered this under the Homestead Act 1862, indicating that he settled around 1882. Fortuitously, he did so when the Minneapolis, St. Paul and Sault Ste. Marie Railroad (always nicknamed the Soo Line) was surveying a railroad on a bee-line diagonally across the future state from Mantador to Portal to be part of a trunk route from Minneapolis to Vancouver, British Columbia. The survey line crossed his property, but initially the nearest town was pencilled in to be two miles south-east, and was to be called Hilltown. However, he offered land to the railroad at a good price and so, in late 1892, Wimbledon was platted and a post office established in 1893. Gibson's farmstead (previously named Gibson after him) had already been a mail-drop beforehand, with his being entrusted to hand on mail to his neighbors -and this would have influenced matters.

Wimbledon was a railroad town, and proof of this is in the layout. Instead of the original platting grid conforming to the Public Land Survey System (PLSS), as most of the state of North Dakota does, it aligned to the railroad. Initially it was seven blocks wide and six deep, but only three of the latter "took" -and the horizontal streets were not given numbers, but descriptions: Railway, Center, and Out. As the town grew, its additions conformed to the PLSS, including areas originally part of the undeveloped back three strips.

=== Youth ===
The first of many grain elevators, for which the town was to be famous, was set up in the year of its foundation. There were to be eight by 1908.

The nascent town prospered, and obtained three indicators of civic status before the century was out. In 1894 the Hotel Kline was founded by Frank Kline, who dealt in railroad-shipped lumber at a time when the countryside hereabouts completely lacked trees. This was important for the future, as it meant commercial travelers and business folk could visit without being gourmandized by bed-bugs in a flophouse. Then, in the same year, the Wimbledon News newspaper was founded. Also, the first public school was set up -although it had to wait till 1906 for proper premises to be provided.

Water supply was a problem in summer, but the town is on an artesian basin. So, the railroad sank a well when the town was founded -but in winter the water pressure was uncontrollable, and the well was finally dynamited in 1916 to stop it flooding the town. The water was saline and unsuitable for drinking or locomotive boilers, anyway. However, it was good for peace of mind -because it enabled an effective fire-fighting department to be set up in 1893 (the early town buildings were all wooden, and fire was capable of burning a whole block out or worse).

The settlement was officially incorporated as a legal village in 1899. In North Dakota before 1967, incorporated settlements were either villages or cities (in that year, they all became cities). So, this amounted to Wimbledon becoming a town in the generally accepted sense of the term.

=== Maturity ===
Indications of the town's coming of age in the new century were the acquisition of a bank (it had two for a time), a horse racing venue and a public cemetery.

The First National Bank of Wimbledon was chartered in 1903, and issued ten and twenty dollar bills. It built a two-storey brick edifice on Third and Center (122 3rd Avenue), but in 1913 faced competition when the Farmers & Merchants Bank of Wimbledon was founded. The latter was to serve the town for almost eighty years, taking over the First National's building after its rival went bankrupt in 1925. It is now (2020) a branch of Bank Forward, but the old edifice has been abandoned and replaced with a single-storey layout on the opposite corner.

Victory Park, to the north-east of the town, became a horse racing venue in 1906 when the Wimbledon Fair and Racing Association was organized and a half-mile track was constructed with a proper grandstand. It lasted over half a century, but is now the town recreation ground.

The Prairie View Cemetery was founded in 1910, and is still in use. It is on 17th Street SE, quite a way east of town (the name is apt).

The town reached peak population of 571 in the 1910 census. In 1920 it was 521, and this was an indication that the first generation of homesteaders was already making way for commercial growers of grain, who were beginning to combine farms in order to enjoy economies of scale.

In 1908, the town had the following businesses and services: Four churches (three survive), a school, two banks, a post office, two hotels, two restaurants, two billiard halls, a newspaper, a telephone exchange (opened 1904), a realtor, two physicians, a dentist, a veterinary, two music instructors, two barbershops, four general stores, two butchers, a bakers, a confectioners, a drugstore, a clothes shop, a jewelers, a furniture store, two hardware stores, a harness shop, two blacksmiths (ironworkers), two tin shops (non-ferrous metalworkers), two implement shops, two livery stables (horse and mule hire places), a dray line (cart hire -no motor taxis or auto hire yet), a feed supplier (ancestor of the filling station), a printer, two painters, a builder and a stonemason. Attorneys were notable by their absence (they would have been around the courthouse in Valley City, but one did hang out his shingle here by 1920) and saloons were obviously not being listed. Not all the folks who ran these establishments would have been fully professional at the time, as many of them would have been homesteading as well.

In 1914, the village board granted an ordnance to the Wimbledon Electric Company to wire up the town. The company generated its own power.

=== Midland Continental Railroad ===
Before 1913, Wimbledon was just one of a string of small towns along the Soo Line railroad, with Leal to the south-east and Courtenay to the north-west. It depended entirely on this railroad for links with the outside world, as there was no state highway system back then.

In 1908, the Midland Continental Railroad (MICO) began construction of a trunk line from Winnipeg to Galveston, Texas passing through Courtenay, Jamestown and Edgeley. It built Edgeley to Jamestown but then, fortunately for Wimbledon, ran out of money for a bridge over the Northern Pacific Railway transcontinental line at the latter place. It was forced to build east to a point where it could burrow cheaply through a fill carrying the main line, and then head north to Wimbledon instead of Courtenay.

The new railroad was finished in October 1913, apart from a very short extension of 0.3 miles (0.5 km) to a location called Frazier north of the Wimbledon passenger station and in open country. This was finished in December. The Wimbledon station was then to the east of downtown, on 17th Street SE.

Frazier on 16 1/2 Avenue SE was the site of an abortive rival town project sponsored by the North Dakota Nonpartisan League, and was named after a prominent member Lynn Frazier (later state governor). The MICO's intention was to go on to Grand Forks, which was dropped when the USA entered the First World War in 1917. That was the end of Frazier as a town. Instead, it became the location of an important set of grain elevators run by the Frazier Farmers Union Co-op, opened in 1917.

The MICO made Wimbledon, in effect, a four-railroad town because, as well as handling its own traffic, it functioned as a terminal road for the Northern Pacific and also for the Chicago, Milwaukee, St. Paul and Pacific Railroad at Edgeley. So, the town gained access to two transcontinental lines and this gave it an edge over its neighbors.

=== Inter-war ===
In 1920 the MICO railroad moved its Wimbledon passenger station downtown from its former location on the city's eastern outskirts, on 17th Street SE. A site was chosen on the corner of Railway Street and 4th Avenue, opposite the Soo main line station, and a short spur built to it from the western junction curve to the Soo Line. The station building was jacked up off its poured concrete foundation and put on rollers for its journey down Railway Street.

The local farmers then were growing wheat and oats in about equal quantities, with alfalfa for feed hay a smaller third. Other crops were rye, potatoes and linseed. Livestock and dairy farming did feature, as a reminder of the original self-sufficient mixed farming ideal of the homestead. A co-operative creamery was opened in 1929, and this also wholesaled the locally reared turkeys.

The creation of the North Dakota State Highway System in 1926 put Wimbledon on the wrong side of its railroads tracks from Route 9, but marked the end of the town's complete dependence on its two railroads.

In that year the MICO ran one train each way to Jamestown but with only a twenty-minute layover, so folk could not go on a day-trip to that city. The Soo Line had two trains each way between Minneapolis and Portal, one slow and one semi-fast. The semi-fast left Wimbledon at 8:10 AM to arrive at Minneapolis at 5:45 PM, the same time as the return train left that city to arrive back at Wimbledon at 9:39 PM. These trains allowed for a full day in the county seat of Valley City, from 9:05 AM to 8:45 PM.

In 1937, the MICO railroad received permission to discontinue timetabled freight and passenger services from Jamestown to Wimbledon and to operate on call and demand, meaning that carload freight customers would contact MICO Control at Jamestown to arrange pickup and delivery. Passenger service continued, but on an irregular basis and would have involved a so-called mixed train consisting of a passenger car attached to a rake of freight cars. The former would have been used for LCL (less than-car-load) freight items as well. The last paying passenger was recorded as travelling in 1965.

=== Later 20th century ===
In 1948, the village board decided to open an airport, and purchased land to the south-west for a single grass runway. The Wimbledon Municipal Airport ended up having six small hangars in total, and was especially useful as a base for crop-spraying aircraft. However, it became a private airfield between 1965 and 1983 and ceased operations between 2001 and 2003. The terminal area including the hangars, on Route 9, was annexed to the city territory despite being in Stutsman County.

In 1950, the town was made a city. It was still three-quarters the size of what it had been at its peak in 1910 -population 449 compared to 571. The local farmers had taken to growing barley, which was the second crop after wheat -pushing oats into third place.

In 1957, the Wimbledon News newspaper ceased publication.

In 1968, the city had: Three churches, a school, a bank, a post office, a hotel, a restaurant, two insurance brokers, two meeting places (the American Legion Hall and the Wimbledon Community Building), a barbershop, a laundromat, two general stores (one called Jack's Red Owl), a hardware store (called Cherney's Hardware), two implement shops, a blacksmith, two oil company outlets, a filling station, a lumber yard, two truck lines, a builder, a home service company and a crop sprayer (based at the airport).

The NICO railroad closed down in 1969, after serious flood damage in the spring of that year. Formal abandonment took place in 1970, and the tracks were mostly torn up. However a stub from Frazier to Clementsville was kept on by the Soo Line to service grain elevators, and this survived until 1982.

The NICO Wimbledon station building was donated to the Wimbledon Community Museum, which kept it on a care-and-maintenance basis for the next forty years.

The American passenger railroad business had been failing for two decades, and in response the federal government created Amtrak in 1971 and relieved railroad companies of the responsibility of running passenger trains. This was the end of the passenger train station at Wimbledon, and so of any public transport links since the city had no scheduled bus service.

=== Recent times ===
The city population has been falling gently but steadily over the last few decades, at about thirty a decade. By 2018, it was down to an estimated 192 -which was a third of the peak in 1910. However this compares well with neighboring settlements which have either ghosted, or are heading that way. Of its near neighbors on the Soo Line railroad, Leal has twenty inhabitants, and Courtenay has forty-seven. On the MICO railroad, Durupt is now a plowed field -this was an older settlement than Wimbledon, and the latter's first Catholic church used to be here before being moved.

The economics of scale in farming continue to be applied in North Dakota, and since 2007 farm size has gone up 20% with a consequent loss of population. On the enlarged farms locally, soybeans had displaced wheat as the number one crop with corn in third place.

In 2012, the old MICO train station was refurbished and opened as the Midland Continental Depot Transportation Museum, featuring the life of Peggy Lee as well as the railroad.

In 2014, the school closed as the result of a merger, and concentration on a more central site for the north part of the county. In 2015, the John Deere agricultural machinery dealership also shut.

As with most small American towns outside touristy areas, running an independent retail or service business here became very economically challenging towards the end of the 20th century. In response to the threat of losing its last general store after the closure of John Deere, locals set up the Wimbledon Community Store and Café as a non-profit organization relying in part on volunteers to run it.

The community has also erected a Veterans' Memorial, completed in 2017.

In 2020, the city had: Three churches, a bank, a post office, a general store with small restaurant and kitchenette for rental, a bar, two insurance brokers, a sleep consultant, a child care center, two farm suppliers (one a co-op with a retail outlet and diner), a car wash and two campsites. The Wimbledon Newsletter is published monthly.

== Topography ==
=== The plat ===
North Dakota has a distinctive checkerboard landscape, owing to its conforming to the Public Land Survey System (PLSS) as it was developed by settlers. Hence, the property boundaries and roads are usually longitudinal (north-south) and latitudinal (east-west). Longitudinal roads are called avenues, and latitudinal ones streets. These are identified by number, often with a compass bearing. Hence State Route 9, which is Wimbledon's access to the outside world, enters the city from the west as 17th Street SE, parallels the railroad diagonally for a short distance (the railroad was there first) and leaves to the south as 97th Avenue SE.

However, Wimbledon is a railroad town and was developed by a company affiliated to the Minneapolis, St. Paul and Sault Ste. Marie Railroad which built its trunk line diagonally across the state. As a result, the original plat grid did not align to the PLSS, but with the railroad. Further, the nomenclature was non-standard. The streets were not given numbers, but descriptions: Railway, Center, and Out. The avenues were given numbers: 1st, 2nd, 2nd 1/2, 3rd, 3rd 1/2, 4th.

The railroad grade crossing was on 3rd Avenue, which hence became the city's main drag and was provided with extra width. It was also extended beyond the original plat to the Roman Catholic church to the north-east, with its landmark spire.

When the town was expanded, it had two large additions laid out to the north and east. These were conformed to the PLSS, with the result that the roadway nomenclature is chaotic and confusing to strangers. For example, 1st Avenue turns to heads east disjunctively, 1st Avenue N (not the same) heads north -and is paralleled by 1st Street N. Gibson Street, on the west edge of the built up area, also heads north -and has no number, because it is west of 1st Avenue N.

A third, very small town expansion of three roadways was laid out at the south-west end of 3rd Avenue, after it crosses Route 9. This remains the only residential area south of the railroad tracks.

=== What is here ===
The railroad remains in business. Route 9 is to the south-west, on the wrong side of it, so the city's Welcome sign is on the junction between it and 3rd Avenue and is surrounded by grain elevators and silos. The oldest of the former has a ghost sign reading Wimbledon Farmers Elevator Co. The farm supply arrangements here belong to Agroline Limited by the junction, and Arrowwood Prairie Co-op further south. The latter is the largest company based in Wimbledon, with its head office here and two sets of premises. Smaller farm requisites and consumables, as well as retail fuel and a diner, are with the office and farm machinery is further on south.

Crossing the railroad grade crossing on 3rd Avenue, the first street is Railway. On this to the right is the site of the original Soo Line passenger station, now occupied by a long shed. Opposite this on the east 4th Avenue corner is the old Midland Continental Railroad station, which is now the Midland Continental Depot Transportation Museum. Across 4th Avenue is a former hotel building, two storeys in red brick with decorative details in the brickwork.

Continuing down 3rd Avenue, some of the buildings facing the road are former retail premises with traditional false pediments for signage. The next junction, with Center, is the city hub. To the near left is the one-storey bank and post office, and facing it is the Wimbledon Community Store and Café. This has an interesting paint job, including an arboreal mural for its small tea-garden. On the far right is the former bank building, two storeys in brick and with identification plaques: First National Bank and 1905. Slightly further on on 3rd is the town bar.

The rest of the city is mostly residential, of recent construction, although the three churches are outside the original plat. Notable is the number of trees -if farming ceased here, the land would revert to forest, not prairie. The pre-settlement prairie was treeless because of bison grazing pressure, not because of climate or soil quality -as was the case further west in the state.

3rd melds with 4th at St Boniface's Catholic Church, and continues as 4th. The city's water tower is just to the north of the church. Further on is the entrance drive to the City Park, which used to be the Victory Park horse racing track. The ghost of the actual track is still visible in the grass.

The Veterans' Memorial is the latest addition to the city's facilities.

== Demographics ==
Historical population
Census	Pop.	Note	%±
1900	226		—
1910	571		152.7%
1920	521		−8.8%
1930	421		−19.2%
1940	357		−15.2%
1950	449		25.8%
1960	402		−10.5%
1970	337		−16.2%
1980	330		−2.1%
1990	275		−16.7%
2000	237		−13.8%
2010	216		−8.9%
2020	178		−17.6%
2022 (est.)	178		0.0%
U.S. Decennial Census; 2020 Census

=== 2010 census ===
As of the census of 2010, there were 216 people, 94 households, and 55 families living in the city. The population density was 407.5 inhabitants per square mile (157.3/km^{2}). There were 119 housing units at an average density of 224.5 per square mile (86.7/km^{2}). The racial makeup of the city was 97.2% White and 2.8% from two or more races. Hispanic or Latino of any race were 0.5% of the population.

There were 94 households, of which 31.9% had children under the age of 18 living with them, 40.4% were married couples living together, 14.9% had a female householder with no husband present, 3.2% had a male householder with no wife present, and 41.5% were non-families. 39.4% of all households were made up of individuals, and 17% had someone living alone who was 65 years of age or older. The average household size was 2.30 and the average family size was 3.11.

The median age in the city was 40 years. 30.1% of residents were under the age of 18; 6.5% were between the ages of 18 and 24; 20.8% were from 25 to 44; 29.2% were from 45 to 64; and 13.4% were 65 years of age or older. The gender makeup of the city was 44.4% male and 55.6% female.

=== 2000 census ===
As of the census of 2000, there were 237 people, 111 households, and 68 families living in the city. The population density was 512.3 inhabitants per square mile (197.8/km^{2}). There were 126 housing units at an average density of 272.4 per square mile (105.2/km^{2}). The racial makeup of the city was 97.89% White, 0.42% African American, and 1.69% from two or more races. Hispanic or Latino of any race were 0.42% of the population, which equates to a single individual.

There were 111 households, out of which 26.1% had children under the age of 18 living with them, 53.2% were married couples living together, 8.1% had a female householder with no husband present, and 38.7% were non-families. 36.0% of all households were made up of individuals, and 18.9% had someone living alone who was 65 years of age or older. The average household size was 2.14 and the average family size was 2.79.

In the city, the population was spread out, with 23.2% under the age of 18, 5.1% from 18 to 24, 27.0% from 25 to 44, 24.9% from 45 to 64, and 19.8% who were 65 years of age or older. The median age was 42 years. For every 100 females, there were 95.9 males. For every 100 females age 18 and over, there were 89.6 males.

The median income for a household in the city was $34,107, and the median income for a family was $42,000. Males had a median income of $26,875 versus $18,333 for females. The per capita income for the city was $16,493. About 5.6% of families and 6.3% of the population were below the poverty line, including 8.8% of those under the age of eighteen and 8.9% of those 65 or over.

== Churches ==
=== St Boniface Catholic Church ===
The Roman Catholic church is at 504 3rd Avenue, the opposite end of that thoroughfare from the railroad crossing.

The first, wooden, church on this site was actually erected in 1886 at Durupt (now a ghost town), five miles south. The dedication to St Boniface, the Apostle to the Germans, indicates the German origins of the first worshipers. When they realised that Wimbledon was going to be more important, they jacked the church up, put it on rollers and used horse power to drag it to its new site just north of the town plat in 1895. This was chosen because it was the highest point hereabouts.

In 1907, a priest's house was under construction. Something went badly wrong, the unfinished building caught fire and the church burned to the ground, too. A new one was erected in the following year. The architect was G. R. Clausen.

This is an impressive Gothic edifice in bright red brick with a few stone details, having a nave without aisles of five bays, a narrower sanctuary of one bay and a three-sided apse. The nave side walls each have five large pointed windows with two-light tracery, separated by buttresses each of which has two sloping steps in stone. The nave roof is steeply pitched, and the sanctuary and apse have separate pitches at a lower level.

The west front has a central tower, mostly set into the first bay of the nave and functioning also as the entrance porch. This tower has a landmark spire, flanked by the gabled tops of the four walls and four corner pinnacles which top corner buttresses. There are three storeys to the tower; the first has the single entrance, in the form of a pointed arch with step molding in brick and with a transom window fitted into the arch above the doorway. The second storey has a large Gothic window with tracery, and the third (the bell-chamber) has a large louvered aperture in each face. The top of the tower's second storey and the sloping nave rooflines on each side are embellished with little floating arcades of Gothic arches in brick.

An unusual device tops the entrance portal, in the form of an acute-angled triangular gable which obscures the large tower window.

=== St John's United Methodist Church ===
This church was originally founded in 1931 as a union of three worshipping communities, Presbyterian, German Reformed and Methodist, which got together to build a proper church edifice. They lacked the resources to do so otherwise. However, the original church has been demolished and replaced by a modern structure on the west side of the city, at 100 Center Street. This is in reinforced concrete with pink brick infill, and is a low rectangular edifice with a distinctive shallow triangular apse occupying its front end flanked by vertical window strips.

=== St Paul's Lutheran Church ===
The Lutheran church is hidden away at 307 Gibson Street, away from downtown and set back from the street. It is a low, nondescript vernacular building with s steeply pitched roof and with no ecclesiastical features. This replaced a Gothic-style church with tower, which was built in 1909.

== Education ==
Students in the Wimbledon area attend Barnes County North Public School, which is located two miles west of Leal. Around 300 students are enrolled in the Barnes County North School District. The district covers Courtenay, Dazey, Eckelson, Rogers, Sanborn, Spiritwood, Spiritwood Lake, Urbana, Walum (actually in Griggs County), and Wimbledon.

Prior to 2007, there were three separate school districts: North Central of Barnes north of Rogers (K-12), Wimbledon-Courtenay in Wimbledon (K-12), and Spiritwood in Spiritwood (K-6). In 2007, the three districts merged into the Barnes County North School District. From 2007 to 2012, the three schools (North Central Campus, Wimbledon-Courtenay Campus, and Spiritwood Campus) operated as they had before the merger. In 2013, the Spiritwood Campus was closed, and the North Central Campus housed preschool through fifth grade, while the Wimbledon-Courtenay Campus housed grades 6-12. In 2014, construction of the centralized facility was completed, and the remaining two facilities were closed, and all students in the district began attending the new Barnes County North Public School.

== Notable people ==
- Lonnie Laffen, politician, born in Wimbledon
- Peggy Lee, singer raised in Wimbledon

== See also ==
- KRVX: radio stations licensed to Wimbledon
- Welcome to Wimbledon, ND -official city site
- Midland Continental Railroad Depot
- Midland Continental Depot Transportation Museum - official museum site
- Wimbledon History online
- National Register of Historic Places, Wimbledon Depot
