= North Dakota Highway 9 =

State highway in North Dakota, US

North Dakota Highway 9
- ND 9 highlighted in red

Route information
- Maintained by NDDOT
- Length: 53.597 mi (86.256 km)

Major junctions
- West end: US 52 / US 281 near Melville
- ND 20 in Courtenay
- East end: ND 1 near Rogers

Location
- Country: United States
- State: North Dakota
- Counties: Foster, Stutsman, Barnes

Highway system
- North Dakota State Highway System; Interstate; US; State
← ND 8	→ US 10

North Dakota Highway 9 (ND 9) is a state highway in eastern North Dakota. It follows a zigzag pattern from U.S. Route 52 (US 52) and US 281 at Melville to ND 1 outside of Rogers. ND 9 originally extended to Canada, and at its current eastern terminus, it followed the route of what is now ND 1 south, but when US 52 was extended into North Dakota, ND 9 was truncated to its current terminus.

== Route description ==
The route starts at an intersection with US 52/US 281 near Melville. It then goes about 22 miles (35 km) without any intersections, passing the Stutsman county line along the way. ND 20 then merges into the route from 86th Avenue, thus beginning the route's concurrency with ND 20. ND 20 then splits using 92nd Avenue in Courtenay. After passing the Barnes county line and going approximately 25 miles (40 km), passing through the city of Wimbledon in the process, the highway ends at ND 1 near Rogers.

== History ==
ND 9 originally extended to the Canadian border along what is now US 52. At its current eastern terminus, the route turned south and followed current ND 1, then turned east and went through Valley City. East of Valley City, the highway turned south again and followed what is now ND 32. When US 52 was extended into North Dakota around 1935, ND 9 was truncated to its current alignment.

== Major intersections ==
County	Location	mi	km	Destinations	Notes
Foster–Stutsman county line	Melville–Walters township line	0.000	0.000	US 52 / US 281 (4th Avenue S) – Jamestown, Carrington	Western terminus
Stutsman	Durham Township	22.620	36.403	ND 20 south (86th Avenue SE) – Jamestown	Western end of ND 20 concurrency
Stutsman	Courtenay	28.003	45.066	ND 20 north (1st Avenue) – Glenfield	Eastern end of ND 20 concurrency
Barnes	Rogers Township	53.597	86.256	ND 1 (109th Avenue NE) – I-94, Dazey, Cooperstown	Eastern terminus
1.000 mi = 1.609 km; 1.000 km = 0.621 mi: Concurrency terminus
