= Ashtabula (disambiguation) =

Ashtabula is a city in Ohio.

Ashtabula may also refer to:

== Places ==
- Ashtabula Township, Barnes County, North Dakota
- Lake Ashtabula, a reservoir in North Dakota
- Ashtabula County, Ohio
- Ashtabula Township, Ashtabula County, Ohio
- Ashtabula River, a river in Ohio
- Ashtabula (Pendleton, South Carolina), a plantation house

== Other uses ==
- Ashtabula, a ferry on Lake Erie
- Ashtabula (spider), a genus of jumping spiders
- Ashtabula, Carson and Jefferson Railroad
- Ashtabula crank, a component of a bicycle bottom bracket
- USS Ashtabula (AO-51), a US Navy fleet oiler
