= Meadow Township =

Meadow Township may refer to the following townships in the United States:

- Meadow Township, Clay County, Iowa
- Meadow Township, Wadena County, Minnesota

== See also ==
- Meadow Brook Township, Cass County, Minnesota
- Meadow Lake Township, Barnes County, North Dakota
- Grand Meadow Township (disambiguation)
- Meadows Township (disambiguation)
