= Grand Prairie (disambiguation) =

Grand Prairie may refer to:

- Grand Prairie (Georgia), a swamp in Georgia
- Grand Prairie, Texas, a city
- Grande Prairie, a city in Alberta, Canada
- An ecoregion in Arkansas
- An ecoregion in Illinois and Indiana

== See also ==
- Grand Prairie Township (disambiguation)
