= Ellsbury =

Ellsbury may refer to one of the following:

- Jacoby Ellsbury, American baseball player for the New York Yankees
- Ellsbury Township, Barnes County, North Dakota, a township in North Dakota
