= Rosebud Township =

Rosebud Township may refer to the following townships in the United States:

- Rosebud Township, Polk County, Minnesota
- Rosebud Township, Barnes County, North Dakota
