= Weimer Township =

Weimer Township may refer to the following townships in the United States:

- Weimer Township, Jackson County, Minnesota
- Weimer Township, Barnes County, North Dakota
