= Albert A. Booth =

American politician

Albert Anson Booth (October 17, 1850 – June 7, 1914) was an American pioneer and early settler and county official in Barnes County, North Dakota in the U.S. state of North Dakota. He helped found Edna Township in Barnes County and served on its township board and as a county commissioner.

== Early life ==
Albert Booth was born in Waukau, Wisconsin, October 17, 1850, to Elliot and Phercelia (Fitch) Booth. His father was a miner during the Gold Rush of 1849. As a child, the family moved to Syracuse, New York, where he lived until 1869. After returning to Wisconsin, he took up residence in Fond du Lac, Wisconsin where he worked as a machinist and logger for the Hamilton Finley Lumber Company. His father died in Stockton, California, in 1885, and his mother died in Fond du Lac in 1876.

Booth was a member of the Masons, the Independent Order of Odd Fellows, and the Ancient Order of United Workmen.

== North Dakota ==
Albert Booth moved to Barnes County on May 24, 1879, where he established a homestead in Section 24 of Township 142N, R60W. Even though it was far from the nearest railroad, he established a successful stock farm where he raised registered shorthorn cattle.

He married Eliza Carter of New York in Waupun, Wisconsin on December 17, 1879. They had eight children: Edna, Alice, Elizabeth, Leila, twins Albert and Blanche, Frank, and Roy. Edna (born 1881) was the first white child born in the township, and it was after her that Edna Township is named. Booth also established a rural post office out of his home on July 25, 1882, also originally named Edna, but ultimately named Booth. The post office was discontinued on November 14, 1884.

Booth, a Republican, was not particularly active in politics, but did serve both as a county commissioner and chairman of the township board of supervisors. He died in 1914 in Cass County, North Dakota.
