= Alta Township =

Alta Township may refer to the following townships in the US:

- Alta Township, Harvey County, Kansas
- Alta Township, Barnes County, North Dakota

== See also ==
- Alta Vista Township, Lincoln County, Minnesota
