= Ashtabula Township =

Ashtabula Township may refer to the following townships in the United States:

- Ashtabula Township, Barnes County, North Dakota
- Ashtabula Township, Ashtabula County, Ohio
