= Sibley, North Dakota =

Sibley
- City
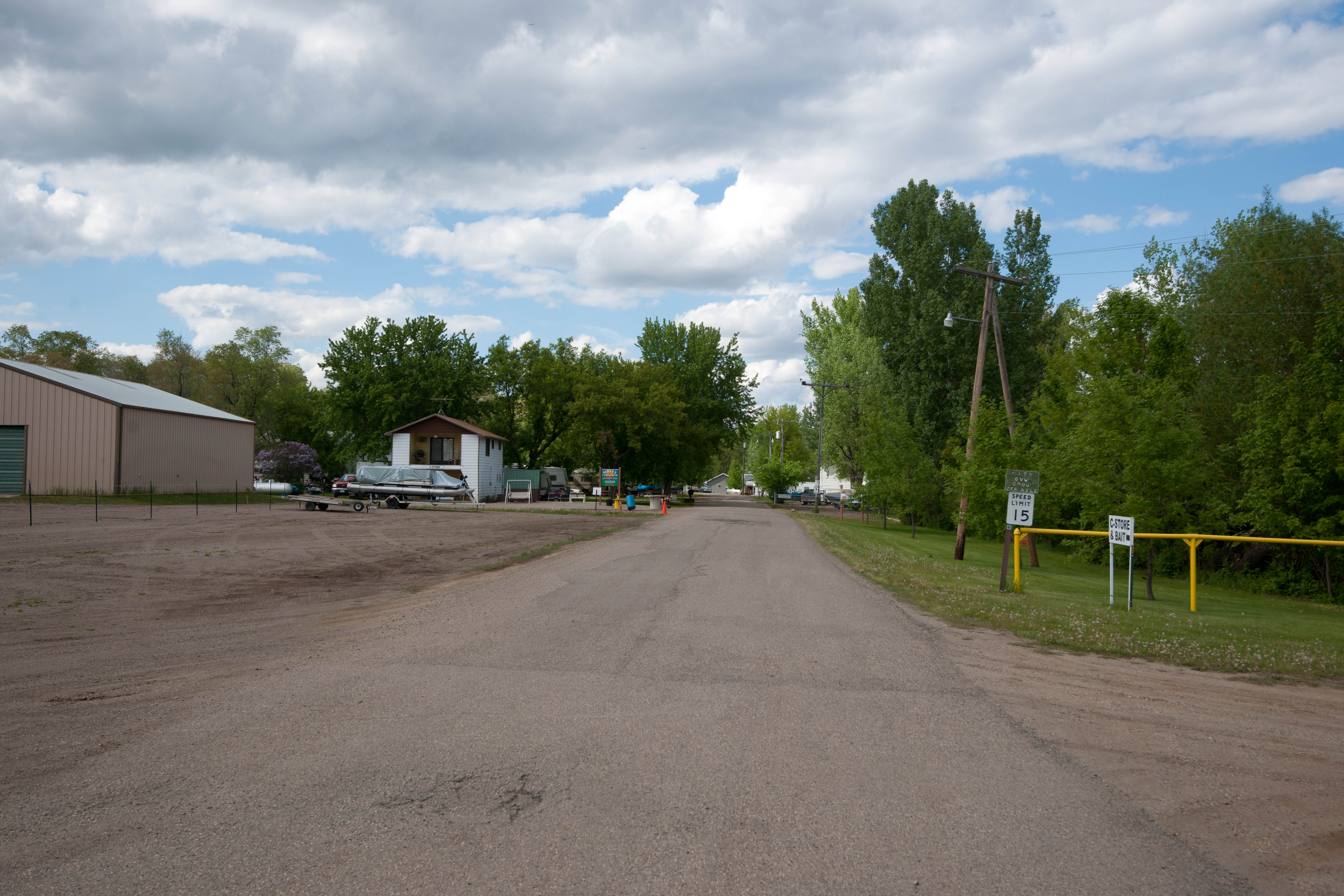
- Street in Sibley

- Location of Sibley, North Dakota
- Coordinates: 47°12′53″N 97°57′55″W
- Country: United States
- State: North Dakota
- County: Barnes
- Founded: 1959

Area
  - Total: 0.046 sq mi (0.12 km^{2})
  - Land: 0.046 sq mi (0.12 km^{2})
  - Water: 0 sq mi (0.00 km^{2})
- Elevation: 1,273 ft (388 m)

Population (2020)
  - Total: 19
  - Estimate (2022): 20
  - Density: 422.8/sq mi (163.23/km^{2})
- Time zone: UTC-6 (Central (CST))
  - Summer (DST): UTC-5 (CDT)
- ZIP code: 58429
- Area code: 701
- FIPS code: 38-72820
- GNIS feature ID: 1032073

Sibley is a city in Barnes County, North Dakota, United States. The population was 19 at the 2020 census. Sibley was founded in 1959.

== Geography ==
Sibley is located at 47°12′53″N 97°57′55″W (47.214858, -97.965218).

According to the United States Census Bureau, the city has a total area of 0.04 square miles (0.10 km^{2}), all land.

== History ==
Sibley was created by Eddie and Edythe Hagglund beginning in 1954, when they observed the popularity of the nearby Lake Ashtabula and decided that a hamburger restaurant would be profitable. Therefore, they purchased some land near the lake and began to erect buildings: a dance hall, the restaurant, and many others. The city was incorporated after a dispute with authorities of Sibley Trail Township: although the Hagglunds wanted a liquor license, the township authorities would not grant one, so the Hagglunds incorporated the city. It was named after Henry Hastings Sibley, a general and the first Governor of Minnesota.

In the 1970s, the Hagglunds sold the majority of the city to others, keeping the core businesses. They retained the business core of the city for many years, even after Eddie's death, but in 2007, Edythe announced the upcoming sale of the remaining parts of the city at auction.

== Demographics ==
Historical population
| Census | Pop. | Note | %± |
|---|---|---|---|
| 1960 | 22 | | — |
| 1970 | 20 | | −9.1% |
| 1980 | 21 | | 5.0% |
| 1990 | 41 | | 95.2% |
| 2000 | 46 | | 12.2% |
| 2010 | 30 | | −34.8% |
| 2020 | 19 | | −36.7% |
| 2022 (est.) | 20 | | 5.3% |
U.S. Decennial Census; 2020 Census

=== 2010 census ===
As of the census of 2010, there were 30 people, 18 households, and 9 families living in the city. The population density was 750.0 inhabitants per square mile (289.6/km^{2}). There were 50 housing units at an average density of 1,250.0 per square mile (482.6/km^{2}). The racial makeup of the city was 96.7% White and 3.3% Native American.

There were 18 households, of which 5.6% had children under the age of 18 living with them, 50.0% were married couples living together, and 50.0% were non-families. 44.4% of all households were made up of individuals, and 27.8% had someone living alone who was 65 years of age or older. The average household size was 1.67 and the average family size was 2.22.

The median age in the city was 67 years. 6.7% of residents were under the age of 18; 0.0% were between the ages of 18 and 24; 9.9% were from 25 to 44; 20.1% were from 45 to 64; and 63.3% were 65 years of age or older. The gender makeup of the city was 56.7% male and 43.3% female.

=== 2000 census ===
As of the census of 2000, there were 46 people, 23 households, and 14 families living in the city. The population density was 1,053.4 inhabitants per square mile (406.7/km^{2}). There were 59 housing units at an average density of 1,351.1 per square mile (521.7/km^{2}). The racial makeup of the city was 100.00% White.

There were 23 households, out of which 21.7% had children under the age of 18 living with them, 47.8% were married couples living together, 13.0% had a female householder with no husband present, and 39.1% were non-families. 34.8% of all households were made up of individuals, and 17.4% had someone living alone who was 65 years of age or older. The average household size was 2.00 and the average family size was 2.57.

In the city, the population was spread out, with 19.6% under the age of 18, 8.7% from 18 to 24, 8.7% from 25 to 44, 30.4% from 45 to 64, and 32.6% who were 65 years of age or older. The median age was 55 years. For every 100 females, there were 100.0 males. For every 100 females age 18 and over, there were 105.6 males.

The median income for a household in the city was $20,469, and the median income for a family was $17,500. Males had a median income of $18,750 versus $22,500 for females. The per capita income for the city was $11,327. There were 14.3% of families and 15.4% of the population living below the poverty line, including 16.7% of under eighteens and 15.4% of those over 64.
