= Cuba Township =

Cuba Township may refer to the following townships in the United States:

- Cuba Township, Lake County, Illinois
- Cuba Township, Becker County, Minnesota
- Cuba Township, Barnes County, North Dakota
