= Getchell =

Getchell is a surname. Notable people with the surname include:

- E. Duncan Getchell (born 1949), American lawyer
- Mike Getchell, retired American soccer midfielder
- Robert Getchell (born 1936), American screenwriter
- Sumner Getchell (1906–1990), American film actor
- William H. Getchell (1829–1910), photographer in 19th-century Boston, Massachusetts

== See also ==
- Getchell, Washington
- Getchell Mine, underground gold mine owned by both Barrick Gold, and Newmont Mining, near Winnemucca, Nevada
- Getchell Township, Barnes County, North Dakota
- Marysville Getchell High School, public high school in Marysville, Washington, USA
