= Pierce, North Dakota =

Pierce, North Dakota may refer to:

- Pierce, North Dakota (hamlet in Slope County)
- Pierce County, North Dakota
- Pierce Township, Barnes County, North Dakota
