= Dazey Township, Barnes County, North Dakota =

Township in Barnes County, North Dakota

Coordinates: 47°11′24″N 98°08′31″W

Dazey Township is a civil township in Barnes County, North Dakota, United States. As of the 2000 census, its population was 59.
