= Spring Creek Township, Barnes County, North Dakota =

Civil township in North Dakota, U.S.

Coordinates: 46°40′03″N 98°06′48″W

Spring Creek Township is a civil township in Barnes County, North Dakota, United States. As of the 2000 census, its population was 85.
