= Hemen Township, Barnes County, North Dakota =

Civil township in North Dakota, U.S.

Coordinates: 46°50′30″N 98°14′18″W

Hemen Township is a civil township in Barnes County, North Dakota, United States. As of the 2000 census, its population was 38.
