= Eckelson, North Dakota =

- Unincorporated community
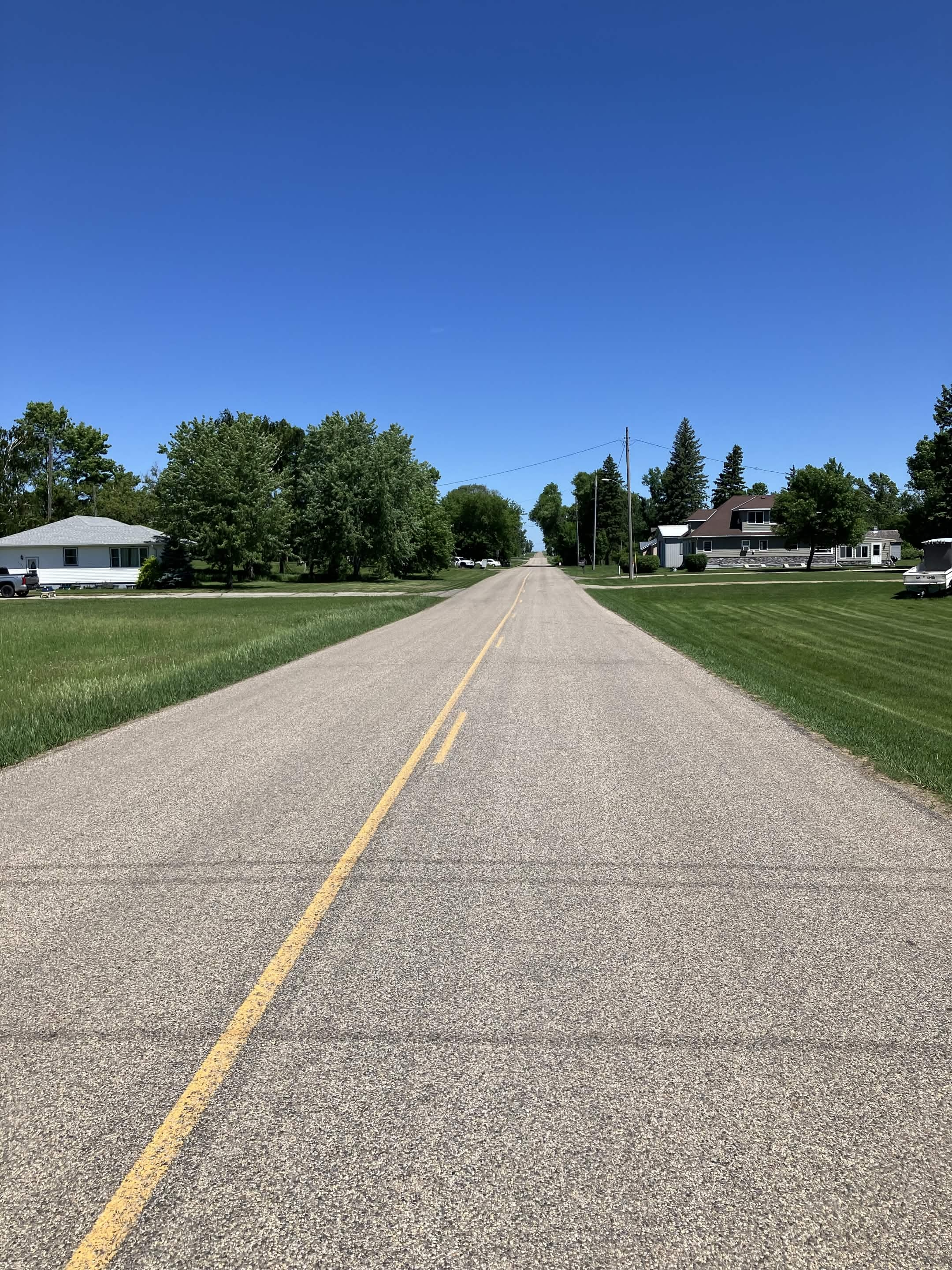

- Location within North Dakota
- Coordinates: 46°56′17″N 98°19′59″W
- Country: United States
- State: North Dakota
- County: Barnes
- Elevation: 1,476 ft (450 m)
- Time zone: UTC-6 (Central (CST))
  - Summer (DST): UTC-5 (CDT)
- Area code: 701
- GNIS feature ID: 1028797

Eckelson is an unincorporated community in Barnes County, North Dakota, United States. Eckelson is west of Sanborn and north of Interstate 94, which has an exit serving Eckelson.

== History ==
The population was 80 in 1940.
