= Hastings, North Dakota =

- Unincorporated community
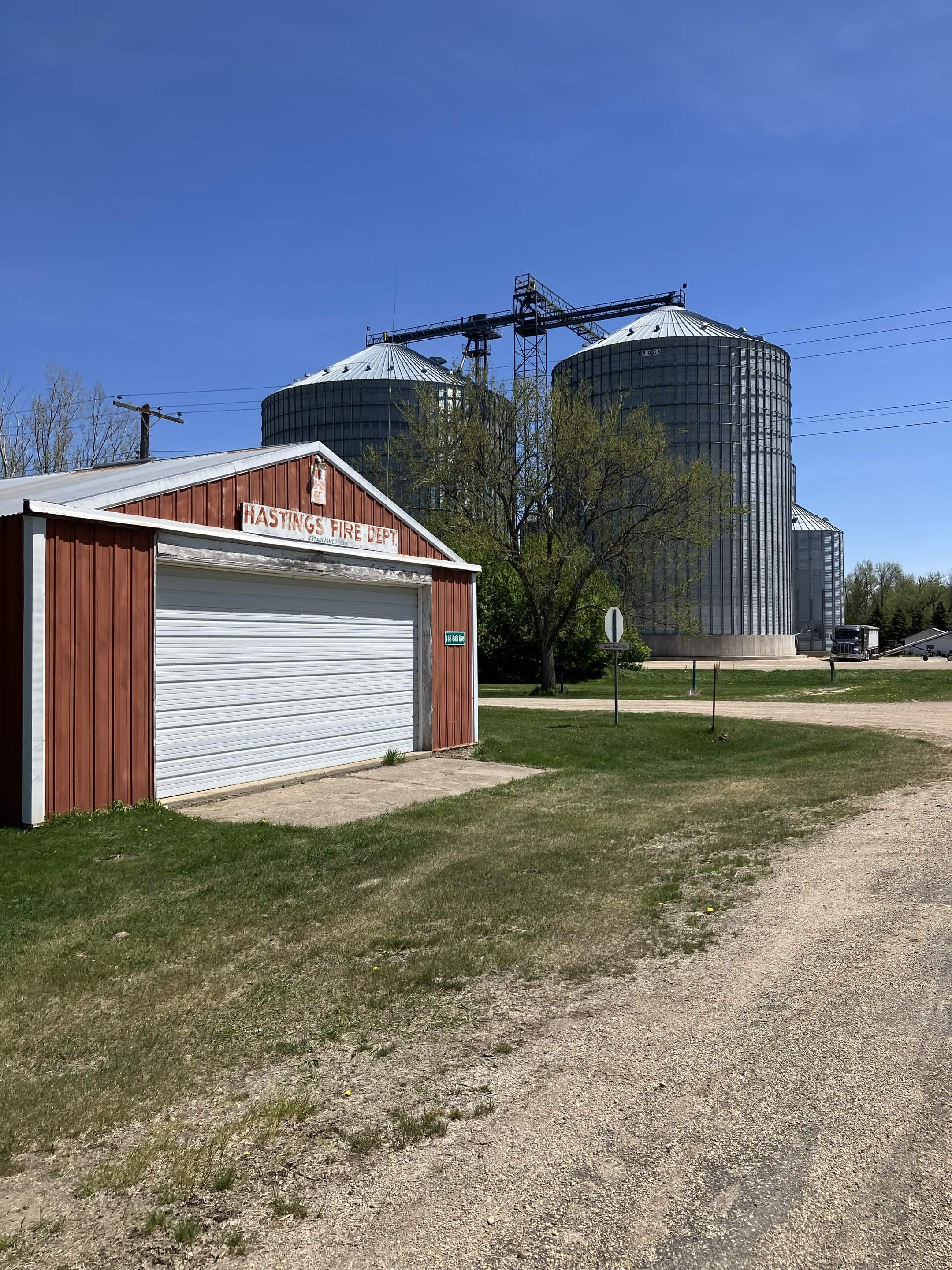

- Location within North Dakota
- Coordinates: 46°41′02″N 98°05′40″W
- Country: United States
- State: North Dakota
- County: Barnes
- Elevation: 1,457 ft (444 m)
- Time zone: UTC-6 (Central (CST))
  - Summer (DST): UTC-5 (CDT)
- Area code: 701
- GNIS feature ID: 1029335

Hastings is an unincorporated community in Barnes County, North Dakota, United States.

A post office operated in Hastings from 1890 to 1967.
