= Leal, North Dakota =

Leal
- City
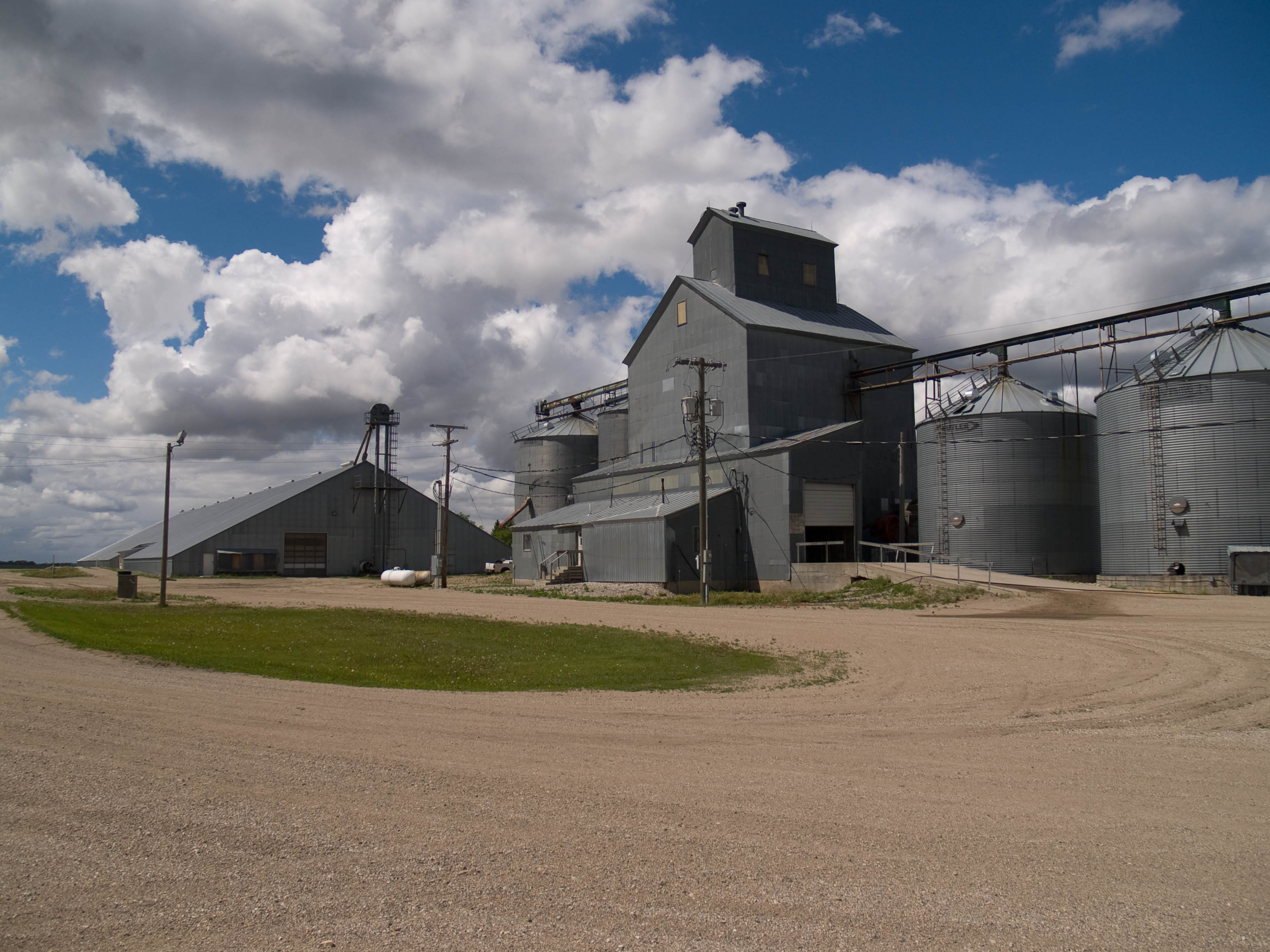
- Grain elevators in Leal

- Location of Leal, North Dakota
- Coordinates: 47°6′20″N 98°18′59″W
- Country: United States
- State: North Dakota
- County: Barnes
- Founded: 1892
- Incorporated (village): 1917
- Incorporated (city): 1967
- Named for: Scottish for "faithful"

Government
  - Type: Mayor-Council
  - Mayor: Dave Lokken

Area
  - Total: 0.13 sq mi (0.33 km^{2})
  - Land: 0.13 sq mi (0.33 km^{2})
  - Water: 0 sq mi (0.00 km^{2})
- Elevation: 1,467 ft (447 m)

Population (2020)
  - Total: 27
  - Estimate (2022): 24
  - Density: 209.5/sq mi (80.87/km^{2})
- Time zone: UTC-6 (Central (CST))
  - Summer (DST): UTC-5 (CDT)
- ZIP code: 58479
- Area code: 701
- FIPS code: 38-45460
- GNIS feature ID: 1029852

Leal is a city in Barnes County in the state of North Dakota. The population was 27 at the 2020 census. Leal was founded in 1892. The name comes from the Scots word for "faithful," which in the phrase laund o the leal means Heaven.

== History ==
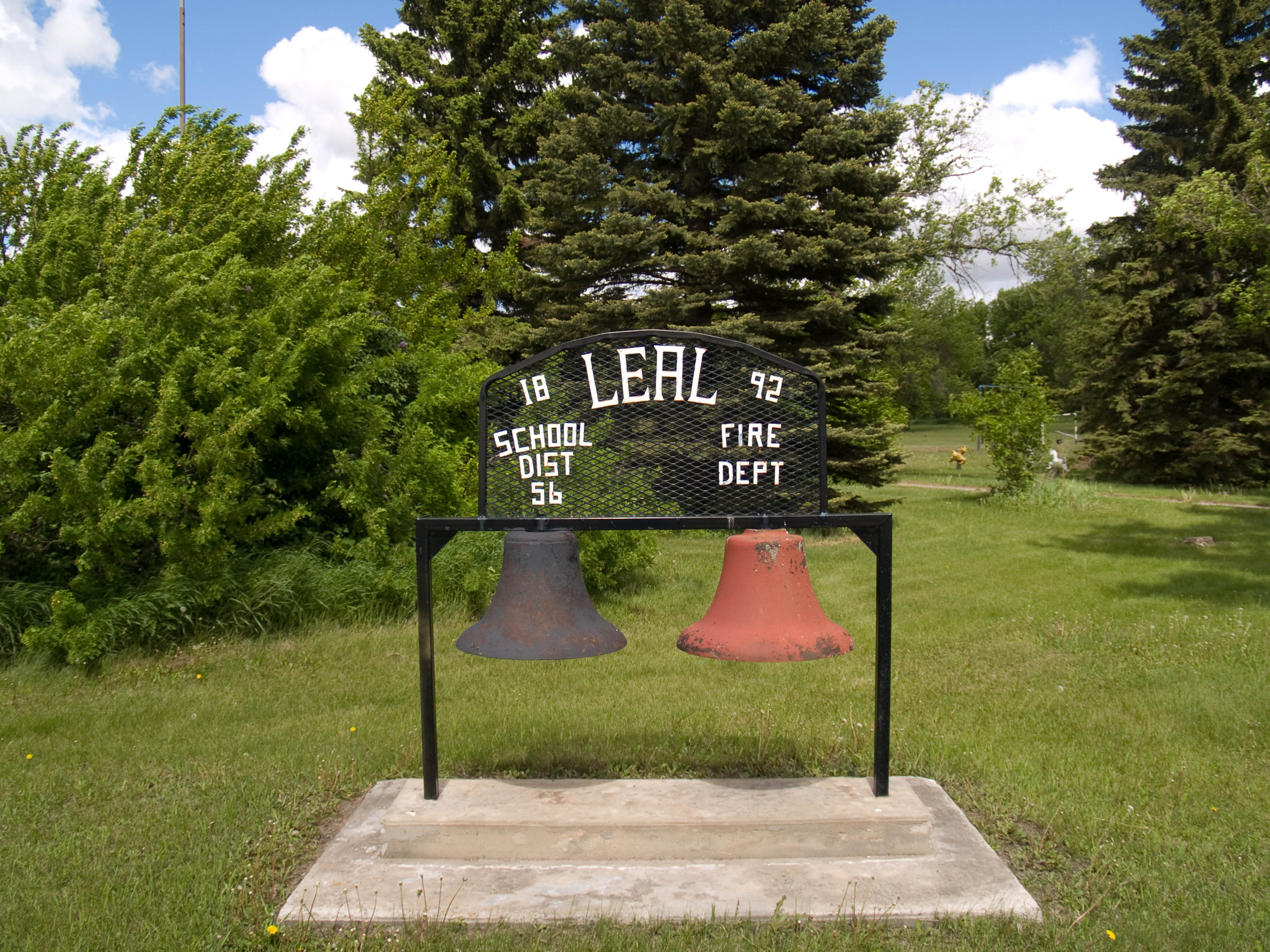
Bell display outside a park in Leal, listing the year of the city's founding "1892"

Scottish-English emigrants from Ontario, Canada, originally settled in this area in 1883. The townsite of Leal was platted in 1892, and a post office established December 28, 1892. Officials with the Soo Line Railroad established a station here in 1902.

Leal incorporated as a village in 1917 from part of Edna Township. It became a city in 1967, after the North Dakota Legislature eliminated incorporation titles for villages and towns. As a result, all incorporated municipalities in North Dakota automatically adopted a city form of government.

== Geography ==
Leal is located in Edna Township in the northeastern part of Barnes County. It is 73 miles (117 km) west of Fargo, and the nearest city is Rogers.

According to the United States Census Bureau, the city has a total area of 0.14 square miles (0.36 km^{2}), all land.

=== Climate ===
Due to its location in the Great Plains and distance from both mountains and oceans, the city has an extreme continental climate, USDA Plant Hardiness Zone 4. The lowest temperature ever recorded was −37 °F (−38 °C) on December 23, 1983, and the highest temperature ever recorded was 106 °F (41 °C) on July 30, 2006.

== Demographics ==
Historical population
Census	Pop.	Note	%±
1920	88		—
1930	105		19.3%
1940	102		−2.9%
1950	72		−29.4%
1960	70		−2.8%
1970	41		−41.4%
1980	45		9.8%
1990	35		−22.2%
2000	36		2.9%
2010	20		−44.4%
2020	27		35.0%
2022 (est.)	24		−11.1%
U.S. Decennial Census; 2020 Census

=== 2010 census ===
As of the census of 2010, there were 20 people, 10 households, and 6 families residing in the city. The population density was 142.9 inhabitants per square mile (55.2/km^{2}). There were 11 housing units at an average density of 78.6 per square mile (30.3/km^{2}). The racial makeup of the city was 95.0% White and 5.0% from two or more races.

There were 10 households, of which 10.0% had children under the age of 18 living with them, 40.0% were married couples living together, 20.0% had a female householder with no husband present, and 40.0% were non-families. 40.0% of all households were made up of individuals, and 10% had someone living alone who was 65 years of age or older. The average household size was 2.00 and the average family size was 2.50.

The median age in the city was 53 years. 15% of residents were under the age of 18; 10% were between the ages of 18 and 24; 15% were from 25 to 44; 45% were from 45 to 64; and 15% were 65 years of age or older. The gender makeup of the city was 35.0% male and 65.0% female.

=== 2000 census ===
As of the census of 2000, there were 36 people, 12 households, and 11 families residing in the city. The population density was 272.4 inhabitants per square mile (105.2/km^{2}). There were 12 housing units at an average density of 90.8 per square mile (35.1/km^{2}). The racial makeup of the city was 100.00% White. The top 4 ancestry groups in the city are Norwegian (65.5%), German (21.8%), Italian (16.4%), and French (16.4%). 21 residents reported having multiple ancestries, meaning these percentages add up to more than 100% of the population.

There were 12 households, out of which 58.3% had children under the age of 18 living with them, 66.7% were married couples living together, 25.0% had a female householder with no husband present, and 8.3% were non-families. 8.3% of all households were made up of individuals, and 8.3% had someone living alone who was 65 years of age or older. The average household size was 3.00 and the average family size was 3.18.

In the city, the population was spread out, with 38.9% under the age of 18, 5.6% from 18 to 24, 27.8% from 25 to 44, 19.4% from 45 to 64, and 8.3% who were 65 years of age or older. The median age was 34 years. For every 100 females, there were 63.6 males. For every 100 females age 18 and over, there were 83.3 males.

The median income for a household in the city was $28,750, and the median income for a family was $31,875. Males had a median income of $27,188 versus $0 for females. The per capita income for the city was $10,662. About 13.3% of families and 9.1% of the population living below the poverty line, including 13.0% of those under 18 and none of those aged 65 and over.

Climate data for Leal, North Dakota
Month	Jan	Feb	Mar	Apr	May	Jun	Jul	Aug	Sep	Oct	Nov	Dec	Year
Mean daily maximum °F (°C)	20 (−7)	25 (−4)	38 (3)	55 (13)	69 (21)	77 (25)	82 (28)	81 (27)	70 (21)	55 (13)	36 (2)	24 (−4)	53 (12)
Mean daily minimum °F (°C)	1 (−17)	7 (−14)	19 (−7)	32 (0)	44 (7)	54 (12)	58 (14)	55 (13)	45 (7)	33 (1)	19 (−7)	7 (−14)	31 (0)
Average precipitation inches (mm)	0.56 (14)	0.50 (13)	0.80 (20)	1.26 (32)	2.61 (66)	2.99 (76)	3.15 (80)	2.25 (57)	1.62 (41)	1.36 (35)	0.63 (16)	0.48 (12)	18.21 (462)
Source: MSN.com
