= Baldwin Township, Barnes County, North Dakota =

Civil township in North Dakota, U.S.

Coordinates: 47°11′23″N 97°53′11″W

Baldwin Township is a civil township in Barnes County, North Dakota, United States. As of the 2000 census, its population was 34.
