= Mansfield Township, Barnes County, North Dakota =

Civil township in North Dakota, U.S.

Coordinates: 46°50′31″N 98°21′51″W

Mansfield Township is a civil township in Barnes County, North Dakota, United States. As of the 2000 census, its population was 41.
