= Thordenskjold Township, Barnes County, North Dakota =

Township in Barnes County, North Dakota

Coordinates: 46°40′00″N 97°51′39″W

Thordenskjold Township is a civil township in Barnes County, North Dakota, United States. As of the 2000 census, its population was 79.
