= Eckelson Township, Barnes County, North Dakota =

Civil township in North Dakota, U.S.

Coordinates: 46°55′44″N 98°22′01″W

Eckelson Township is a civil township in Barnes County, North Dakota, United States. As of the 2000 census, its population was 95.
