= Minnie Lake Township, Barnes County, North Dakota =

Minnie Lake Township
- Municipality
- Location within North Dakota Location within the United States
- Coordinates: 47°06′08″N 97°45′31″W

Area
  - Total: 36.14 sq mi (93.61 km^{2})
  - Land: 36.13 sq mi (93.58 km^{2})
  - Water: 0.012 sq mi (.03 km^{2}) .03%
- Elevation: 1,224 ft (373 m)

Population (2010)
  - Total: 50
- Time zone: CTZ(UTC-6)
  - Summer (DST): CTZ(UTC-5)

Minnie Lake Township is a civil township in Barnes County, North Dakota, United States. As of the 2000 census, its population was 63.

== Demography ==
According to the 2010 census, there were 50 people residing in Minnie Lake Township. Of the 50 residents, 98% were White, 2% other race.
