= Eastedge, North Dakota =

- Unincorporated community
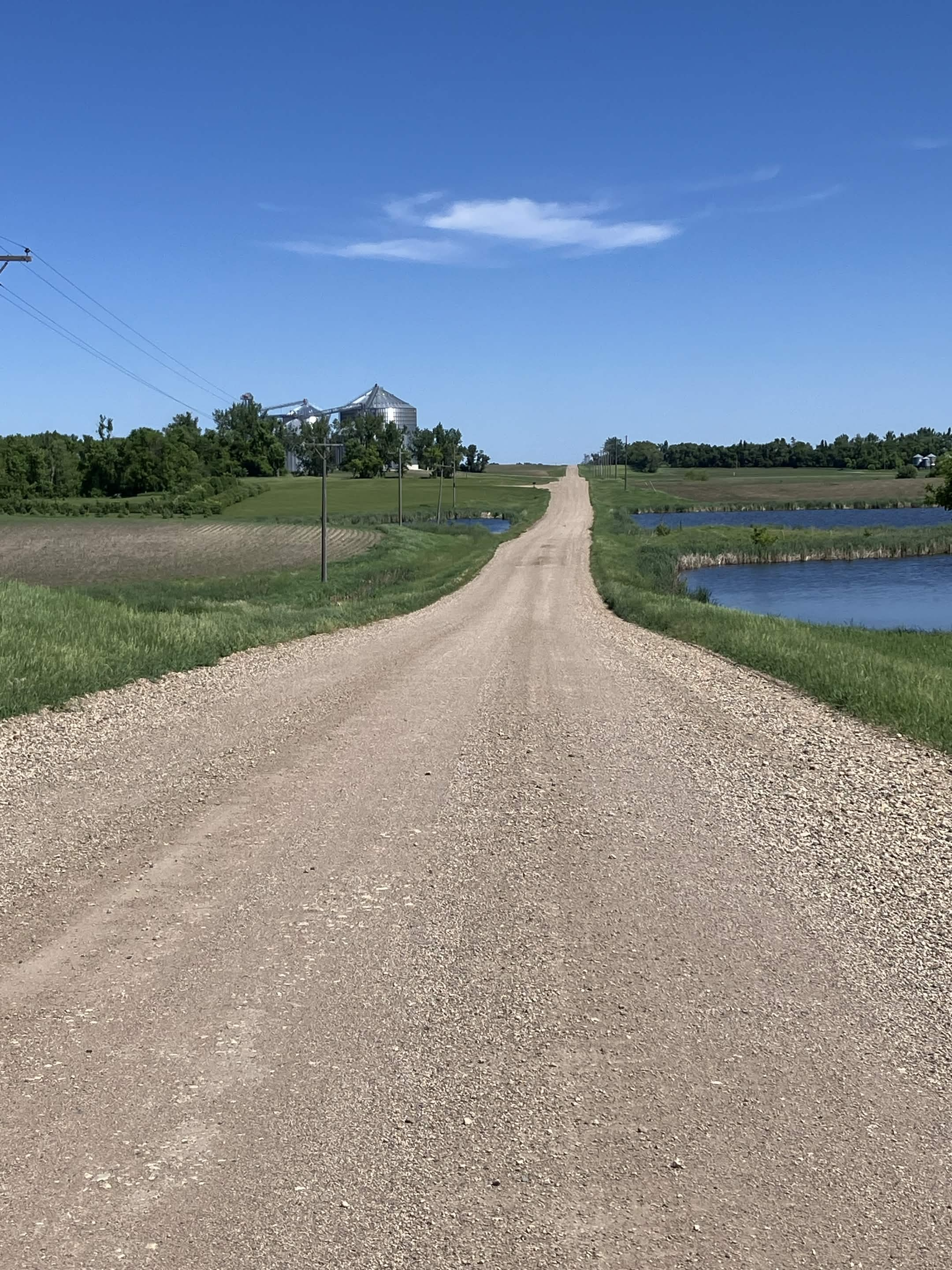

- Location within North Dakota
- Coordinates: 46°39′24″N 97°53′32″W
- Country: United States
- State: North Dakota
- County: Barnes
- Elevation: 1,362 ft (415 m)
- Time zone: UTC-6 (Central (CST))
  - Summer (DST): UTC-5 (CDT)
- Area code: 701
- GNIS feature ID: 1033753

Eastedge is an unincorporated community in Barnes County, North Dakota, United States.

== History ==
The population was 28 in 1940. By the 1960s, the town was almost completely abandoned. Today, only two homes and the remnants of a railroad loading dock remain.

A post office operated in Eastedge from 1902 to 1954.
