= Koldok, North Dakota =

- Unincorporated community
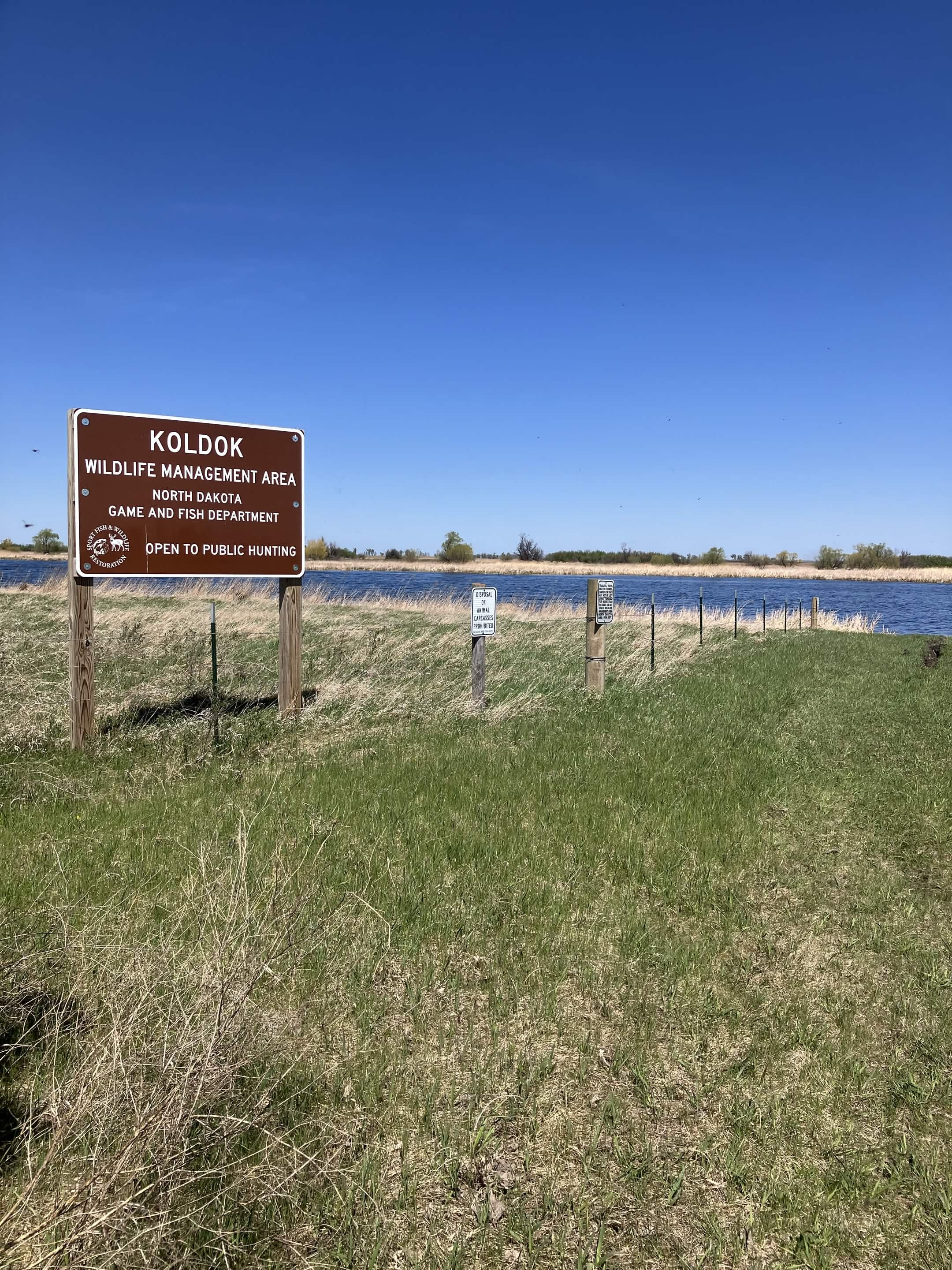

- Location within North Dakota
- Coordinates: 46°55′43″N 97°43′25″W
- Country: United States
- State: North Dakota
- County: Barnes
- Elevation: 1,198 ft (365 m)
- Time zone: UTC-6 (Central (CST))
  - Summer (DST): UTC-5 (CDT)
- Area code: 701
- GNIS feature ID: 1033772

Koldok is an unincorporated community in Barnes County, North Dakota, United States. The unincorporated community takes its name from the presence of a large coal storage facility, Coal-dock, having first had to change its name from Brackett due to the latter's similarity with Brocket.
