= Kathryn, North Dakota =

- City
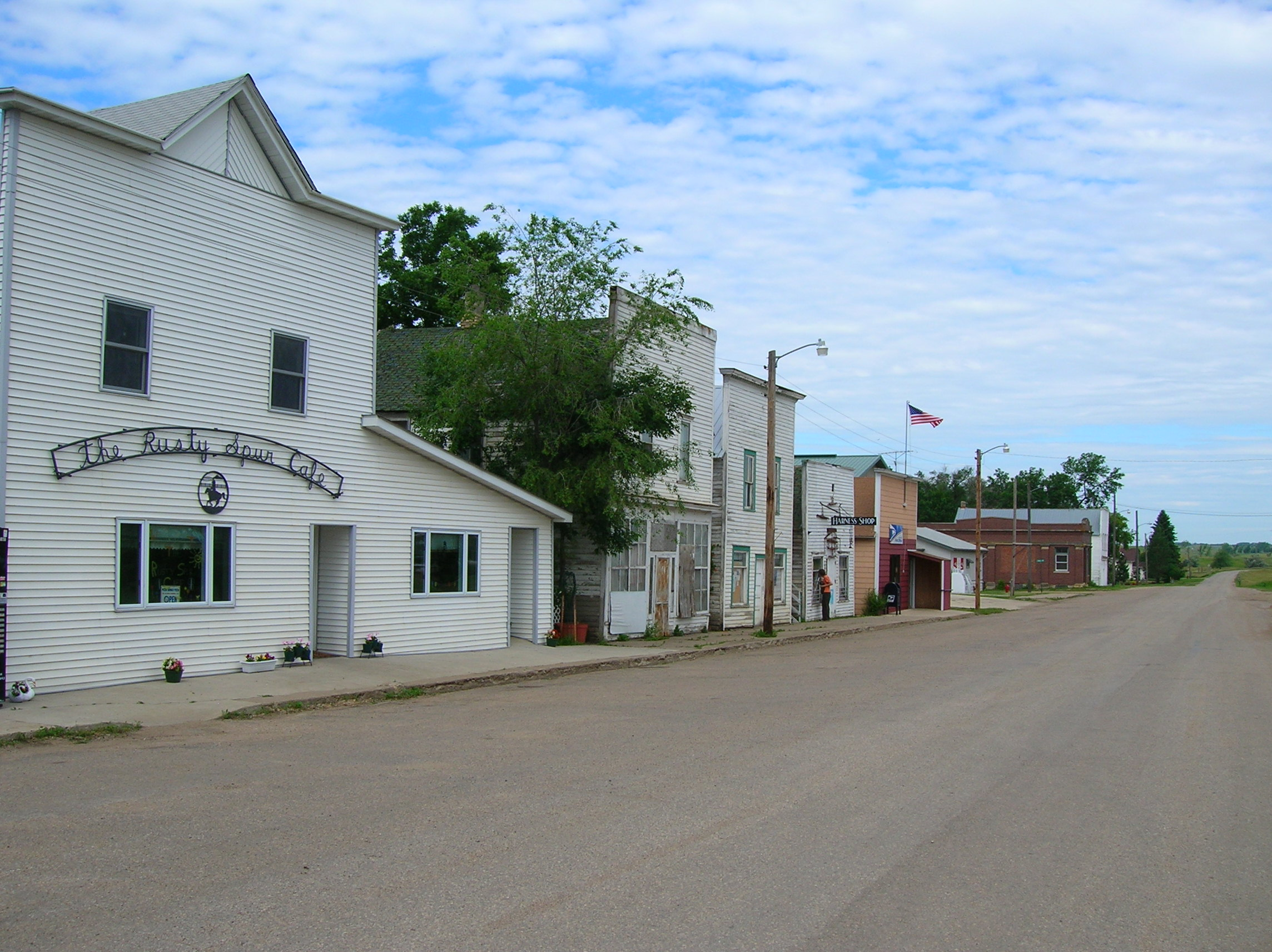
- The white storefronts in Kathryn have been preserved close to their historic 1900s state.

- Location of Kathryn, North Dakota
- Coordinates: 46.681174°N 97.970358°W
- Country: United States
- State: North Dakota
- County: Barnes
- Founded: 1900

Area
  - Total: 0.581 sq mi (1.506 km^{2})
  - Land: 0.581 sq mi (1.506 km^{2})
  - Water: 0 sq mi (0.000 km^{2})
- Elevation: 1,194 ft (364 m)

Population (2020)
  - Total: 66
  - Estimate (2024): 66
  - Density: 113.5/sq mi (43.83/km^{2})
- Time zone: UTC–6 (Central (CST))
  - Summer (DST): UTC–5 (CDT)
- ZIP Code: 58049
- Area code: 701
- FIPS code: 38-41500
- GNIS feature ID: 1029718

Kathryn is a city in Barnes County, North Dakota, United States. The population was 66 at the 2020 census. Kathryn was founded in 1900. It was named after the daughter of a railroad man.

== Geography ==
Kathryn is located at 46°40′46″N 97°58′13″W (46.681174, –97.970358).

According to the United States Census Bureau, the city has a total area of 0.581 square miles (1.50 km^{2}), all land.

== Demographics ==
Historical population
Census	Pop.	Note	%±
1920	289		—
1930	224		−22.5%
1940	229		2.2%
1950	200		−12.7%
1960	142		−29.0%
1970	109		−23.2%
1980	95		−12.8%
1990	72		−24.2%
2000	63		−12.5%
2010	52		−17.5%
2020	66		26.9%
2024 (est.)	66		0.0%
U.S. Decennial Census; 2020 Census

=== 2010 census ===
As of the 2010 census, there were 52 people, 30 households, and 12 families living in the city. The population density was 88.1 inhabitants per square mile (34.0/km^{2}). There were 37 housing units at an average density of 62.7 per square mile (24.2/km^{2}). The racial makeup of the city was 100.0% White.

There were 30 households, of which 13.3% had children under the age of 18 living with them, 30.0% were married couples living together, 10.0% had a male householder with no wife present, and 60.0% were non-families. 46.7% of all households were made up of individuals, and 36.7% had someone living alone who was 65 years of age or older. The average household size was 1.73 and the average family size was 2.42.

The median age in the city was 59.7 years. Of the residents, 13.5% were under 18, 3.7% were between 18 and 24, 15.4% were between 25 and 44, 23.1% were between 45 and 64, and 44.2% were 65 or older. The gender distribution was 40.4% male and 59.6% female.

=== 2000 census ===
As of the 2000 census, there were 63 people, 29 households, and 18 families living in the city. The population density was 106.1 inhabitants per square mile (41.0/km^{2}). There were 43 housing units at an average density of 72.4 per square mile (28.0/km^{2}). The racial makeup of the city was 100.00% white.

There were 29 households, out of which 17.2% had children under the age of 18 living with them, 51.7% were married couples living together, 10.3% had a female householder with no husband present, and 34.5% were non-families. 31.0% of all households were made up of individuals, and 20.7% had someone living alone who was 65 years of age or older. The average household size was 2.17 and the average family size was 2.58.

In the city, the population was spread out, with 14.3% under the age of 18, 3.2% from 18 to 24, 28.6% from 25 to 44, 22.2% from 45 to 64, and 31.7% who were 65 years of age or older. The median age was 48 years. For every 100 females, there were 117.2 males. For every 100 females age 18 and over, there were 116.0 males.

The median income for a household in the city was $19,375, and the median income for a family was $40,625. Males had a median income of $30,625 versus $19,375 for females. The per capita income for the city was $15,618. There were 15.4% of families and 16.4% of the population living below the poverty line, including no under eighteens and 18.2% of those over 64.
