= Red River Valley and Western Railroad =

- Route map of the RRVW. Solid lines are trackage owned by the railroad; dotted lines are those with trackage rights.

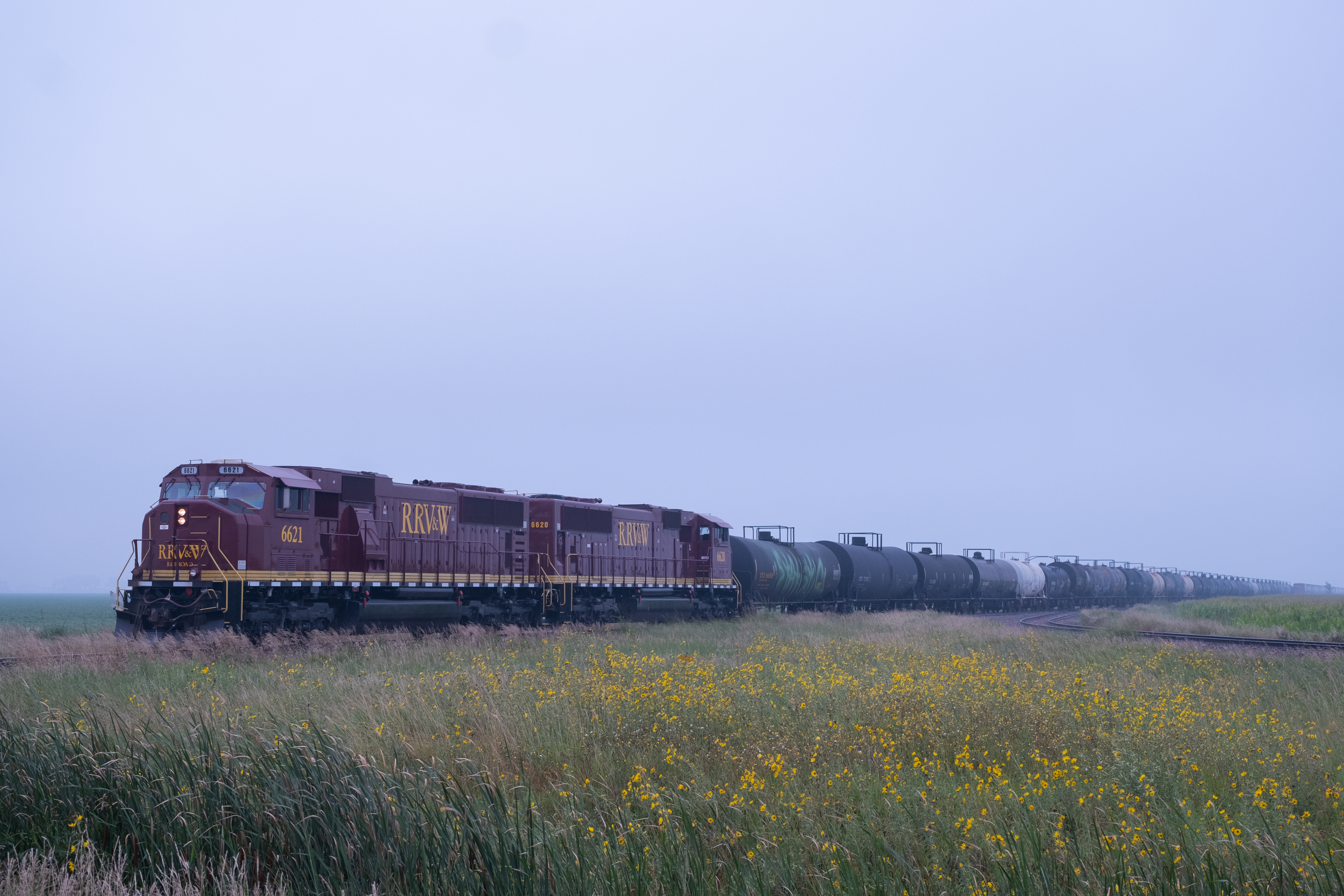
- RRVW train outside Davenport, North Dakota.

Overview
- Headquarters: Wahpeton, North Dakota
- Reporting mark: RRVW
- Locale: North Dakota with a branch into Minnesota
- Dates of operation: 1987–

Technical
- Track gauge: 4 ft 8 1/2 in (1,435 mm) standard gauge

Other
- Website: www.rrvw.net

The Red River Valley and Western Railroad (reporting mark RRVW) is a regional railroad operating in the US states of North Dakota and Minnesota. It began operations in 1987 in an era of railroad restructuring.

Its 648 miles (1,043 km) of track, originally acquired from the Burlington Northern Railroad, included:

- Wahpeton, North Dakota to Oakes, North Dakota
- Breckenridge, Minnesota to Brushvale, Minnesota
- Wahpeton, North Dakota to Casselton, North Dakota
- Chaffee Junction, North Dakota to Chaffee, North Dakota
- Casselton, North Dakota to Marion, North Dakota
- Oakes, North Dakota to Jamestown, North Dakota
- Horace, North Dakota to Independence, North Dakota
- La Moure, North Dakota to Edgeley, North Dakota
- Jamestown, North Dakota to Minnewaukan, North Dakota
- Pingree, North Dakota to Regan, North Dakota
- Carrington, North Dakota to Turtle Lake, North Dakota
- Oberon, North Dakota to Esmond, North Dakota

Shortly after it began operations, the Red River Valley and Western Railroad acquired a 19-mile (31 km) rail line between Oakes, North Dakota and Hecla, South Dakota from the Dakota, Minnesota, and Eastern Railroad. It abandoned 18 miles (29 km) of this rail line, beginning just south of Oakes, North Dakota, on September 7, 2001.

Currently, the Red River Valley and Western Railroad owns and operates 490 miles (790 km) of trackage which includes:

- Breckenridge, Minnesota to Brushvale, Minnesota
- Wahpeton, North Dakota to Oakes, North Dakota
- Wahpeton, North Dakota to Casselton, North Dakota
- Chaffee Junction, North Dakota to Chaffee, North Dakota
- Oakes, North Dakota to Jamestown, North Dakota
- Horace, North Dakota to Independence, North Dakota
- La Moure, North Dakota to Edgeley, North Dakota
- Jamestown, North Dakota to Maddock, North Dakota
- Pingree, North Dakota to Woodworth, North Dakota
- Additional trackage rights on the BNSF Railway and the CPKC Railway from Ransom Junction, North Dakota to Lucca, North Dakota, from Casselton, North Dakota to Jamestown, North Dakota, and from Breckenridge, Minnesota to Geneseo Junction, North Dakota

The Red River Valley and Western Railroad is affiliated with the Twin Cities and Western Railroad and the Minnesota Prairie Line.

Preceded by	Regional Railroad of the Year; 1997	Succeeded by Texas Mexican Railway
Preceded by Wheeling and Lake Erie Railway	Regional Railroad of the Year; 2005	Succeeded by Buffalo and Pittsburgh Railroad
