= Marsh Township, Barnes County, North Dakota =

Civil township in North Dakota, U.S.

Coordinates: 46°50′28″N 97°59′12″W

Marsh Township is a civil township in Barnes County, North Dakota, United States. As of the 2000 census, its population was 229.
