= Green Township, Barnes County, North Dakota =

Civil township in North Dakota, U.S.

Coordinates: 46°50′30″N 98°06′46″W

Green Township is a civil township in Barnes County, North Dakota, United States. As of the 2000 census, its population was 97.
