= Meadows Township =

Meadows Township may refer to the following townships in the United States:

- Meadows Township, Stokes County, North Carolina
- Meadows Township, Wilkin County, Minnesota

== See also ==
- Meadow Township (disambiguation)
