= Potter Township, Barnes County, North Dakota =

Civil township in North Dakota, U.S.

Coordinates: 46°55′43″N 98°14′17″W

Potter Township is a civil township in Barnes County, North Dakota, United States. As of the 2000 census, its population was 41.
