= Springvale Township, Barnes County, North Dakota =

Civil township in North Dakota, U.S.

Coordinates: 46°50′25″N 97°44′03″W

Springvale Township is a civil township in Barnes County, North Dakota, United States. As of the 2000 census, its population was 60.
