= Binghampton Township, Barnes County, North Dakota =

Civil township in North Dakota, U.S.

Coordinates: 46°45′12″N 97°44′03″W

Binghampton Township is a civil township in Barnes County, North Dakota, United States. As of the 2000 census, its population was 100.
