= Oakhill Township, Barnes County, North Dakota =

Civil township in North Dakota, U.S.

Coordinates: 46°40′00″N 97°59′17″W

Oakhill Township is a civil township in Barnes County, North Dakota, United States. As of the 2000 census, its population was 79.
