= Grand Prairie Township =

Grand Prairie Township may refer to one of the following places in the United States:

- Grand Prairie Township, Jefferson County, Illinois
- Grand Prairie Township, Nobles County, Minnesota
- Grand Prairie Township, Platte County, Nebraska
- Grand Prairie Township, Barnes County, North Dakota
- Grand Prairie Township, Marion County, Ohio
