= Raritan Township, Barnes County, North Dakota =

Civil township in North Dakota, U.S.

Coordinates: 46°39′59″N 97°44′05″W

Raritan Township is a civil township in Barnes County, North Dakota, United States. As of the 2000 census, its population was 108.
