= Grand Prairie (Georgia) =

Swamp in Georgia, United States

Coordinates: 30°40′21″N 82°13′17″W

Grand Prairie is a swamp in the U.S. state of Georgia.

Grand Prairie was so named on account of a fanciful resemblance to Western prairies.
