= Grand Prairie Township, Barnes County, North Dakota =

Township in Barnes County, North Dakota

Coordinates: 47°06′08″N 97°53′10″W

Grand Prairie Township is a civil township in Barnes County, North Dakota, United States. As of the 2000 census, its population was 49.
