= Cuba Township, Barnes County, North Dakota =

Coordinates: 46°50′25″N 97°51′38″W

Cuba Township
- Township
- Interactive map of Cuba Township
- Country: United States
- State: North Dakota
- County: Barnes County

Area
  - Total: 35.800 sq mi (92.722 km^{2})
  - Land: 35.800 sq mi (92.722 km^{2})
  - Water: 0 sq mi (0 km^{2}) 0%

Population
  - Total: 89
- Time zone: UTC-6 (CST)
  - Summer (DST): UTC-5 (CDT)

Cuba Township is a civil township in Barnes County, North Dakota, United States. As of the 2000 census, its population was 89.
