= Alta Township, Barnes County, North Dakota =

Civil township in North Dakota, U.S.

Coordinates: 46°55′38″N 97°51′36″W

Alta Township is a civil township in Barnes County, North Dakota, United States. As of the 2020 census, its population was 123. The township is named after Alta Ridge, a moraine belt overlooking the Sheyenne River Valley.
