= Getchell Township, Barnes County, North Dakota =

Civil township in North Dakota, U.S.

Coordinates: 47°00′54″N 98°00′44″W

Getchell Township is a civil township in Barnes County, North Dakota, United States. As of the 2000 census, its population was 68.
