= Barnes County, North Dakota =

County in North Dakota, United States

- County
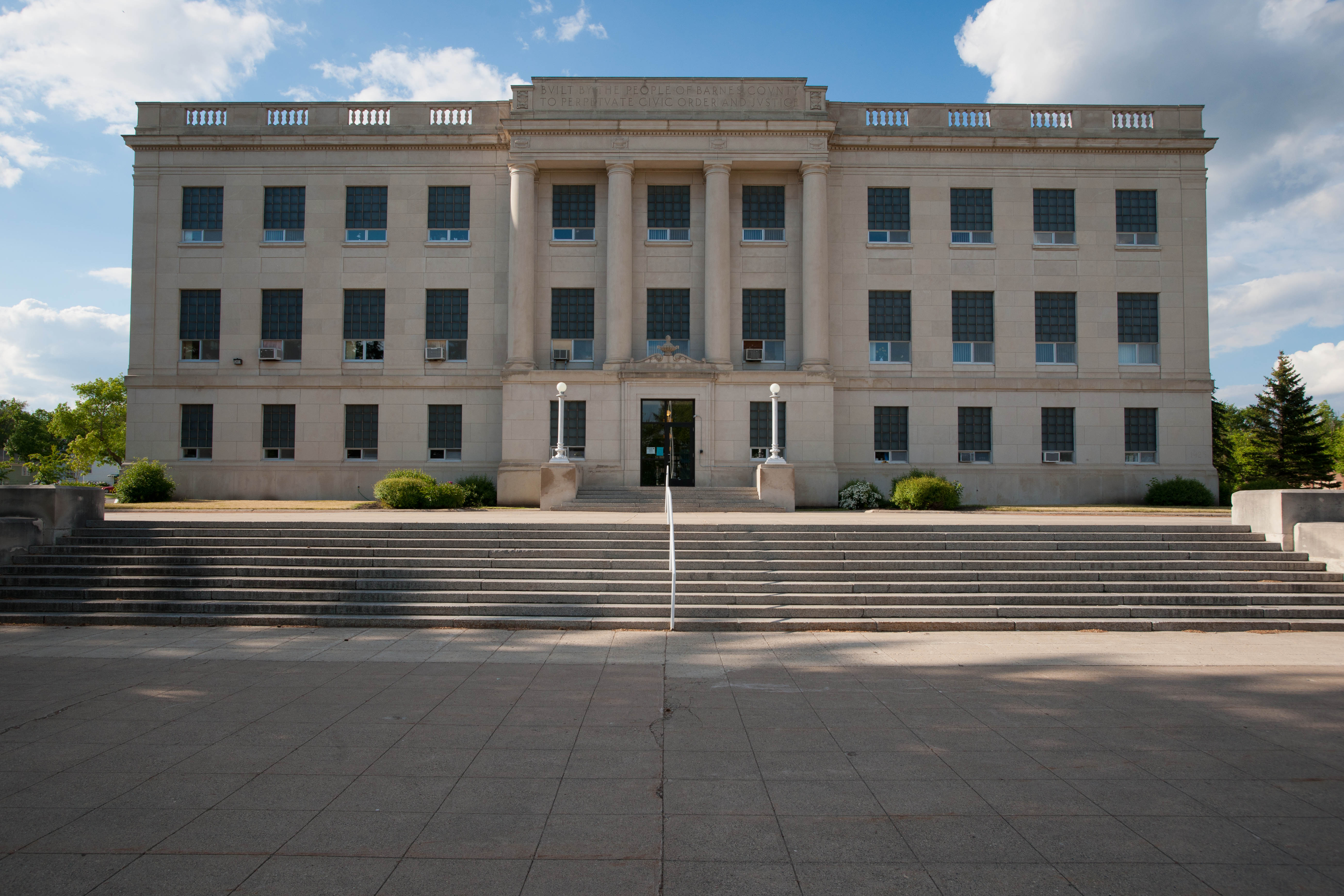
- The Barnes County Courthouse in Valley City

- Seal

- Location within the U.S. state of North Dakota
- Coordinates: 46.94255°N 98.070195°W
- Country: United States
- State: North Dakota
- Founded: January 4, 1873 (created as Burbank); January 14, 1875 (renamed as Barnes); August 5, 1878 (organized)
- Named for: Judge Alanson H. Barnes
- Seat: Valley City
- Largest city: Valley City

Area
  - Total: 1,513.404 sq mi (3,919.70 km^{2})
  - Land: 1,491.559 sq mi (3,863.12 km^{2})
  - Water: 21.845 sq mi (56.58 km^{2}) 1.44%

Population (2020)
  - Total: 10,853
  - Estimate (2025): 10,573 ▼
  - Density: 7.239/sq mi (2.795/km^{2})
- Time zone: UTC−6 (Central)
  - Summer (DST): UTC−5 (CDT)
- Area code: 701
- Congressional district: At-large
- Website: barnescounty.us

Barnes County is a county in the U.S. state of North Dakota. As of the 2020 census, the population was 10,853, and was estimated to be 10,573 in 2025, The county seat and the largest city is Valley City.

== History ==
In 1872–1873, the territorial legislature as Burbank County, being named for John A. Burbank (1872–1905), governor of the Dakota Territory from 1869 to 1873. It was renamed at the 1874–1875 session for Judge Alanson H. Barnes (1818–1890), associate justice assigned to the northern half of the territory. Government organized: January 6, 1879. County Seat: Valley City, 1879–present.

== Geography ==
Native vegetation based on NRCS soils information

The Sheyenne River flows southerly through the central part of Barnes County. The county terrain consists of rolling hills, carved with drainages, and dotted with lakes and ponds. The area is largely devoted to agriculture. The terrain slopes to the south and east; its highest point is on its upper west boundary line, at 1,535 ft (468 m) ASL.

According to the United States Census Bureau, the county has a total area of 1,513.404 square miles (3,919.70 km^{2}), of which 1,491.559 square miles (3,863.12 km^{2}) is land and 21.845 square miles (56.58 km^{2}) (1.44%) is water. It is the 15th largest county in North Dakota by total area.

=== Major highways ===
- I-94
- US 52
- ND 1
- ND 9
- ND 18
- ND 26
- ND 32
- ND 46

=== Transit ===
- Jefferson Lines

=== Adjacent counties ===
- Griggs County – north
- Steele County – northeast
- Cass County – east
- Ransom County – southeast
- LaMoure County – southwest
- Stutsman County – west

=== Protected areas ===
- Clausen Springs Recreation Area
- Clausen Springs State Game Management Area
- Hobart Lake National Wildlife Refuge
- Koldak State Game Management Area
- Riparian Restoration Interpretative Site
- Stoney Slough National Wildlife Refuge
- Tomahawk Lake National Wildlife Refuge

=== Lakes ===
- Lake Ashtabula
- Eckelson Lake
- Fox Lake
- Goose Lake
- Hobart Lake
- Island Lake
- Kee Lake
- Lake Benson
- Meadow Lake
- Moon Lake
- Mud Lake
- Round Lake
- Saint Marys Lake
- Sanborn Lake
- Tomahawk Lake

== Demographics ==
Historical population
Census	Pop.	Note	%±
1880	1,585		—
1890	7,045		344.5%
1900	13,159		86.8%
1910	18,066		37.3%
1920	18,678		3.4%
1930	18,804		0.7%
1940	17,814		−5.3%
1950	16,884		−5.2%
1960	16,719		−1.0%
1970	14,669		−12.3%
1980	13,960		−4.8%
1990	12,545		−10.1%
2000	11,775		−6.1%
2010	11,066		−6.0%
2020	10,853		−1.9%
2025 (est.)	10,573	▼	−2.6%
U.S. Decennial Census; 1790–1960 1900–1990; 1990–2000 2010–2020

As of the fourth quarter of 2024, the median home value in Barnes County was $178,111. As of the 2023 American Community Survey, there are 4,852 estimated households in Barnes County with an average of 2.09 persons per household. The county has a median household income of $70,230. Approximately 11.5% of the county's population lives at or below the poverty line. Barnes County has an estimated 62.4% employment rate, with 30.0% of the population holding a bachelor's degree or higher and 95.3% holding a high school diploma.

The top five reported ancestries (people were allowed to report up to two ancestries, thus the figures will generally add to more than 100%) were English (97.0%), Spanish (0.7%), Indo-European (1.2%), Asian and Pacific Islander (1.1%), and Other (0.0%). The median age in the county was 42.9 years.

Barnes County, North Dakota – racial and ethnic composition
Note: the US Census treats Hispanic/Latino as an ethnic category. This table excludes Latinos from the racial categories and assigns them to a separate category. Hispanics/Latinos may be of any race.

Race / ethnicity (NH = non-Hispanic)	Pop. 1980	Pop. 1990	Pop. 2000	Pop. 2010	Pop. 2020
White alone (NH)	13,846 (99.18%)	12,389 (98.76%)	11,477 (97.47%)	10,599 (95.78%)	9,964 (91.81%)
Black or African American alone (NH)	17 (0.12%)	27 (0.22%)	53 (0.45%)	83 (0.75%)	177 (1.63%)
Native American or Alaska Native alone (NH)	47 (0.34%)	57 (0.45%)	90 (0.76%)	71 (0.64%)	92 (0.85%)
Asian alone (NH)	19 (0.14%)	38 (0.30%)	22 (0.19%)	58 (0.52%)	69 (0.64%)
Pacific Islander alone (NH)	—	—	0 (0.00%)	1 (0.01%)	2 (0.02%)
Other race alone (NH)	3 (0.02%)	0 (0.00%)	2 (0.02%)	1 (0.01%)	24 (0.22%)
Mixed race or multiracial (NH)	—	—	67 (0.57%)	130 (1.17%)	340 (3.13%)
Hispanic or Latino (any race)	28 (0.20%)	34 (0.27%)	64 (0.54%)	123 (1.11%)	185 (1.70%)
Total	13,960 (100.00%)	12,545 (100.00%)	11,775 (100.00%)	11,066 (100.00%)	10,853 (100.00%)

=== 2024 estimate ===
As of the 2024 estimate, there were 10,798 people and 4,852 households residing in the county. There were 5,719 housing units at an average density of 3.84 per square mile (1.5/km^{2}). The racial makeup of the county was 92.5% White (91.1% NH White), 2.2% African American, 1.7% Native American, 1.6% Asian, 0.1% Pacific Islander, _% from some other races and 1.9% from two or more races. Hispanic or Latino people of any race were 2.1% of the population.

=== 2020 census ===
As of the 2020 census, there were 10,853 people, 4,772 households, and 2,751 families residing in the county. The population density was 7.3 inhabitants per square mile (2.8/km^{2}). There were 5,671 housing units at an average density of 3.80 per square mile (1.5/km^{2}), of which 15.9% were vacant. Among occupied housing units, 68.0% were owner-occupied and 32.0% were renter-occupied; the homeowner vacancy rate was 1.9% and the rental vacancy rate was 13.8%.

Of the residents, 19.5% were under the age of 18 and 22.9% were 65 years of age or older; the median age was 43.9 years. For every 100 females there were 102.9 males, and for every 100 females age 18 and over there were 103.0 males.

The racial makeup of the county was 92.4% White, 1.7% Black or African American, 0.9% American Indian and Alaska Native, 0.6% Asian, 0.7% from some other race, and 3.6% from two or more races. Hispanic or Latino residents of any race comprised 1.7% of the population.

Of the 4,772 households, 22.9% had children under the age of 18 living with them and 23.9% had a female householder with no spouse or partner present. About 36.1% of all households were made up of individuals and 15.3% had someone living alone who was 65 years of age or older.

=== 2010 census ===
As of the 2010 census, there were 11,066 people, 4,826 households, and 2,927 families residing in the county. The population density was 7.4 inhabitants per square mile (2.9/km^{2}). There were 5,704 housing units at an average density of 3.82 per square mile (1.5/km^{2}). The racial makeup of the county was 96.40% White, 0.78% African American, 0.65% Native American, 0.52% Asian, 0.02% Pacific Islander, 0.22% from some other races and 1.41% from two or more races. Hispanic or Latino people of any race were 1.11% of the population. In terms of ancestry, 48.4% were German, 37.2% were Norwegian, 8.3% were Irish, 5.2% were English, and 2.7% were American.

Of the 4,826 households, 24.8% had children under the age of 18 living with them, 50.8% were married couples living together, 6.4% had a female householder with no husband present, 39.3% were non-families, and 32.9% of all households were made up of individuals. The average household size was 2.19 and the average family size was 2.79. The median age was 44.3 years.

The median income for a household in the county was $41,773 and the median income for a family was $59,558. Males had a median income of $42,575 versus $30,361 for females. The per capita income for the county was $26,152. About 6.4% of families and 12.0% of the population were below the poverty line, including 12.6% of those under age 18 and 14.6% of those age 65 or over.

== Communities ==
=== Cities ===
- Dazey
- Fingal
- Kathryn
- Leal
- Litchville
- Nome
- Oriska
- Pillsbury
- Rogers
- Sanborn
- Sibley
- Tower City (part)
- Valley City (county seat)
- Wimbledon

=== Unincorporated communities ===
- Berea
- Eastedge
- Eckelson
- Hastings
- Koldok
- Lucca

=== Townships ===
- Alta
- Anderson
- Ashtabula
- Baldwin
- Binghampton
- Brimer
- Cuba
- Dazey
- Eckelson
- Edna
- Ellsbury
- Getchell
- Grand Prairie
- Green
- Greenland
- Hemen
- Hobart
- Lake Town
- Mansfield
- Marsh
- Meadow Lake
- Minnie Lake
- Nelson
- Noltimier
- Norma
- Oakhill
- Oriska
- Pierce
- Potter
- Raritan
- Rogers
- Rosebud
- Sibley Trail
- Skandia
- Spring Creek
- Springvale
- Stewart
- Svea
- Thordenskjold
- Uxbridge
- Valley
- Weimer

== Notable people ==
- Frank White, eighth governor of North Dakota and treasurer of the United States
- Peggy Lee, singer & actress
- Earl Pomeroy, U.S. Congressman
- Morley Nelson, conservationist

== Politics ==
Like North Dakota as a whole, Barnes County voters have been reliably Republican for decades. In only one national election since 1936 has the county selected the Democratic County candidate.

United States presidential election results for Barnes County, North Dakota
Year	Republican		Democratic		Third party(ies)	
Year	No.	%	No.	%	No.	%
1900	1,324	53.78%	1,077	43.74%	61	2.48%
1904	2,041	76.13%	451	16.82%	189	7.05%
1908	1,786	62.06%	996	34.61%	96	3.34%
1912	570	24.72%	940	40.76%	796	34.52%
1916	1,467	45.08%	1,678	51.57%	109	3.35%
1920	5,150	80.27%	1,101	17.16%	165	2.57%
1924	3,205	51.46%	346	5.56%	2,677	42.98%
1928	3,755	53.01%	3,293	46.49%	35	0.49%
1932	2,527	32.96%	4,833	63.04%	307	4.00%
1936	2,324	30.00%	4,484	57.89%	938	12.11%
1940	4,649	57.67%	3,384	41.97%	29	0.36%
1944	3,696	55.55%	2,922	43.92%	35	0.53%
1948	3,385	51.33%	2,892	43.86%	317	4.81%
1952	5,534	71.84%	2,120	27.52%	49	0.64%
1956	4,475	61.99%	2,730	37.82%	14	0.19%
1960	4,403	57.71%	3,223	42.25%	3	0.04%
1964	2,987	42.62%	4,007	57.18%	14	0.20%
1968	3,831	56.30%	2,623	38.55%	351	5.16%
1972	4,518	61.14%	2,804	37.95%	67	0.91%
1976	4,011	53.75%	3,321	44.51%	130	1.74%
1980	4,392	59.79%	2,128	28.97%	826	11.24%
1984	4,348	62.79%	2,507	36.20%	70	1.01%
1988	3,631	55.47%	2,858	43.66%	57	0.87%
1992	2,728	42.30%	2,124	32.94%	1,597	24.76%
1996	2,449	44.79%	2,317	42.37%	702	12.84%
2000	3,452	60.06%	1,933	33.63%	363	6.32%
2004	3,541	60.92%	2,186	37.61%	86	1.48%
2008	2,826	49.63%	2,741	48.14%	127	2.23%
2012	2,964	53.68%	2,394	43.35%	164	2.97%
2016	3,160	59.13%	1,597	29.88%	587	10.98%
2020	3,568	64.12%	1,820	32.70%	177	3.18%
2024	3,531	66.14%	1,661	31.11%	147	2.75%

== Education ==
School districts:

- Barnes County North Public School District 7
- Enderlin Area Public School District 24
- Griggs County Central School District 18
- Hope-Page Public Schools
- Litchville-Marion School District
- Maple Valley Public School District
- Montpelier Public School District 14
- Valley City Public School District

Former districts:

- Hope Public School District 10 - Consolidated with Page district in 2020
- Oriska School District - Consolidated into Maple Valley in 2003
- Page Public School District 80 - Consolidated with Hope district in 2020

== See also ==
- National Register of Historic Places listings in Barnes County, North Dakota
