= Melville, North Dakota =

- Unincorporated community
- Location within North Dakota Location within the United States
- Coordinates: 47°20′05″N 99°02′08″W
- Country: United States
- State: North Dakota
- County: Foster
- Elevation: 1,604 ft (489 m)
- Time zone: UTC-6 (Central (CST))
  - Summer (DST): UTC-5 (CDT)
- Area code: 701
- GNIS feature ID: 1030192

Melville is an unincorporated community in Foster County, North Dakota, United States. Melville is located along U.S. routes 52 and 281 and the Red River Valley and Western Railroad, 9 miles (14 km) south-southeast of Carrington. Melville was originally named Newport after Northern Pacific Railway treasurer R. M. Newport; its name was changed to Melville for landowner Melville D. Carrington.
