= Uxbridge Township, Barnes County, North Dakota =

Civil township in North Dakota, U.S.

Coordinates: 47°06′09″N 98°23′36″W

Uxbridge Township is a civil township in Barnes County, North Dakota, United States. As of the 2000 census, its population was 111.

The original post office was named Uxbridge, by the first postmaster and early settler, John Bascom, who emigrated from Uxbridge, Ontario, Canada. The post office address has since been renamed. The township retains the original name of Uxbridge and is a subdivision of Barnes County.
