= Ashtabula (spider) =

Scientific classification
- Kingdom: Animalia
- Phylum: Arthropoda
- Subphylum: Chelicerata
- Class: Arachnida
- Order: Araneae
- Infraorder: Araneomorphae
- Family: Salticidae
- Subfamily: Salticinae
- Genus: Ashtabula; Peckham & Peckham, 1894

Type species
- A. zonura Peckham & Peckham, 1894

Species
- 9, see text

Genus of spiders

Ashtabula is a genus of jumping spiders that was first described by G. W. Peckham & E. G. Peckham in 1894.

== Species ==
As of June 2019 it contains nine species, found in Central America, Colombia, Brazil, Uruguay, Venezuela, and Mexico:

- Ashtabula bicristata (Simon, 1901) – Venezuela
- Ashtabula cuprea Mello-Leitão, 1946 – Uruguay
- Ashtabula dentata F. O. Pickard-Cambridge, 1901 – Guatemala to Panama
- Ashtabula dentichelis Simon, 1901 – Venezuela
- Ashtabula furcillata Crane, 1949 – Venezuela
- Ashtabula glauca Simon, 1901 – Mexico
- Ashtabula montana Chickering, 1946 – Panama
- Ashtabula sexguttata Simon, 1901 – Brazil
- Ashtabula zonura Peckham & Peckham, 1894 (type) – Colombia
