= Lucca, North Dakota =

- Unincorporated community
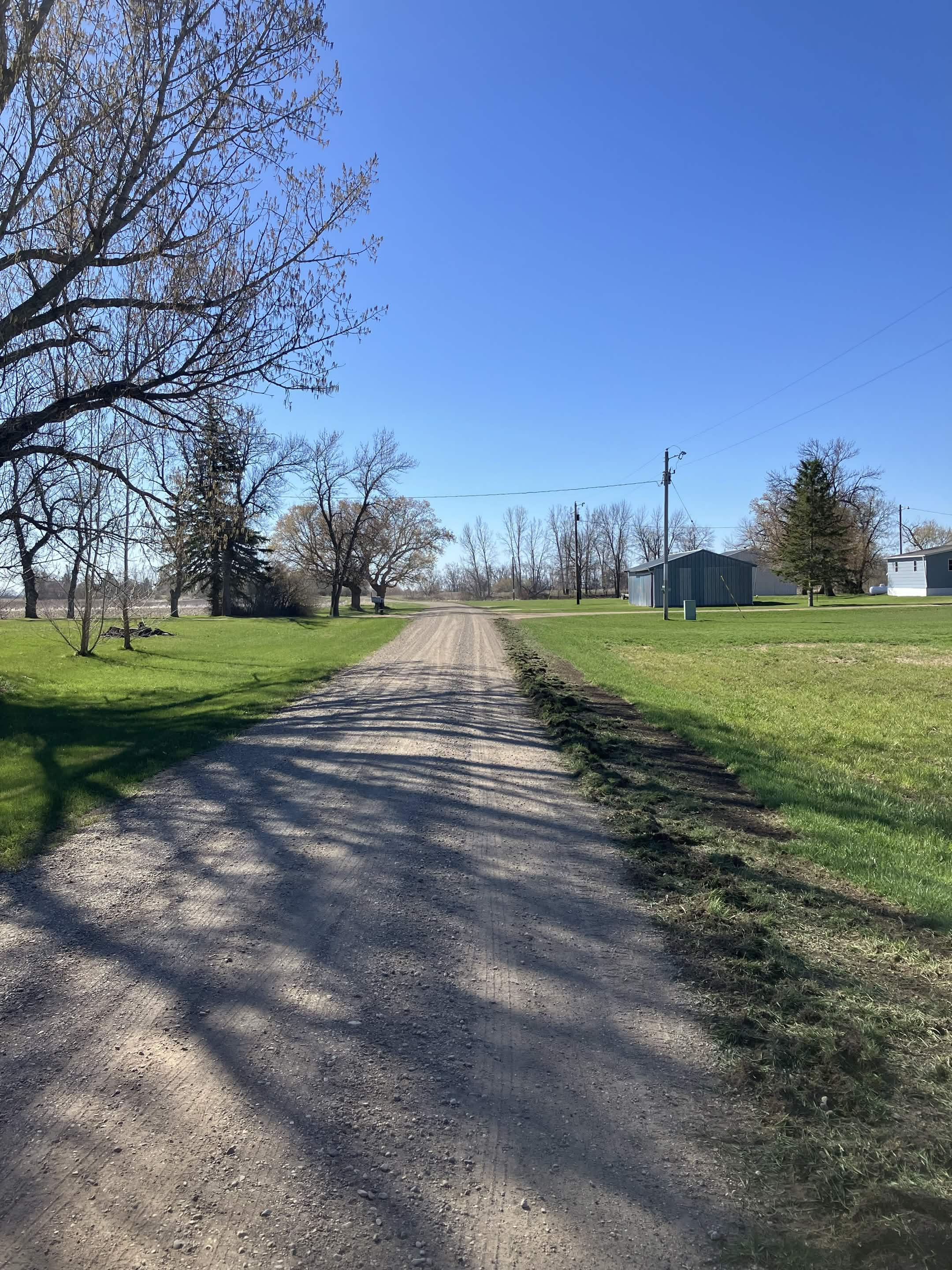

- Location within North Dakota Location within the United States
- Coordinates: 46°42′25″N 97°43′11″W
- Country: United States
- State: North Dakota
- County: Barnes
- Elevation: 1,210 ft (370 m)
- Time zone: UTC-6 (Central (CST))
  - Summer (DST): UTC-5 (CDT)
- Area code: 701
- GNIS feature ID: 1030035

Lucca is an unincorporated community in Barnes County, North Dakota, United States. The community was probably named after Pauline Lucca, an opera singer, although there is a claim it was named for Lucca, a city in Tuscany, Italy.

A post office operated in Lucca from 1891 to 1968.
