= Sibley Trail Township, Barnes County, North Dakota =

Civil township in North Dakota, U.S.

Coordinates: 47°11′24″N 98°00′48″W

Sibley Trail Township is a civil township in Barnes County, North Dakota, United States. As of the 2000 census, its population was 85.
