= Anderson Township, Barnes County, North Dakota =

Civil township in North Dakota, U.S.

Coordinates: 47°00′57″N 98°15′55″W

Anderson Township is a civil township in Barnes County, North Dakota, United States. As of the 2000 census, its population was 56.
