= Ashtabula Township, Barnes County, North Dakota =

Civil township in North Dakota, U.S.

Coordinates: 47°06′08″N 98°00′41″W

Ashtabula Township is a civil township in Barnes County, North Dakota, United States. As of the 2000 census, its population was 93.

The Sheyenne River runs through Ashtabula Township. The Baldhill Dam on the river creates Lake Ashtabula.
