= Meadow Lake Township, Barnes County, North Dakota =

Civil township in North Dakota, U.S.

Coordinates: 46.754429°N 98.364535°W

Meadow Lake Township is a civil township in Barnes County, North Dakota, United States. As of the 2020 census, its population was 72. The township is located in Public Land Survey System Township 138N, Range 61W.

== History ==
Meadow Lake Township was organized March 2, 1903. The township was originally named Clark City Township, after a settlement of the same name that was founded in the 1880s. It was renamed in July 1903 after a slough in the region that was often used to grow hay.

The township is home to several American Indian archeological sites.
