= Weimer Township, Barnes County, North Dakota =

Civil township in North Dakota, United States

Coordinates: 47°00′49″N 97°45′31″W

Weimer Township is a civil township in Barnes County, North Dakota, United States. According to the 2020 U.S. Census, the population of Weimer Township was 42.
