= Grand Meadow Township =

Grand Meadow may refer to:

- Grand Meadow Township, Cherokee County, Iowa
- Grand Meadow Township, Clayton County, Iowa
- Grand Meadow Township, Mower County, Minnesota
- Grand Meadow Township, South Dakota in Minnehaha County, South Dakota
