= Lake Town Township, Barnes County, North Dakota =

Civil township in North Dakota, U.S.

Coordinates: 47°11′23″N 98°16′04″W

Lake Town Township is a civil township in Barnes County, North Dakota, United States. According to the 2000 census, the population was 40.
