= Courtenay, North Dakota =

- City
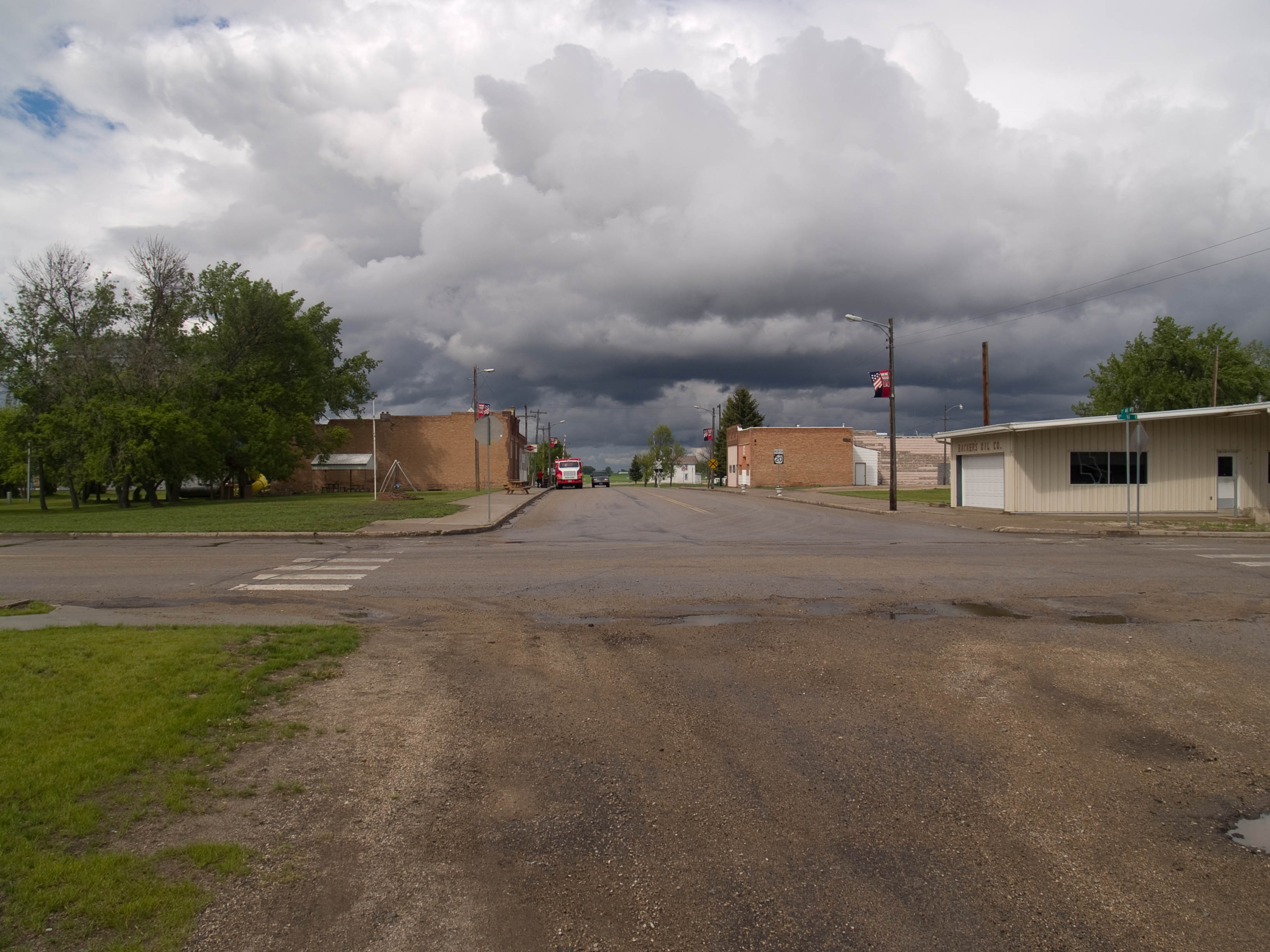
- Business district of Courtenay

- Location of Courtenay, North Dakota
- Coordinates: 47°13′27″N 98°34′07″W
- Country: United States
- State: North Dakota
- County: Stutsman

Area
  - Total: 0.42 sq mi (1.08 km^{2})
  - Land: 0.42 sq mi (1.08 km^{2})
  - Water: 0 sq mi (0.00 km^{2})
- Elevation: 1,522 ft (464 m)

Population (2020)
  - Total: 36
  - Density: 86.1/sq mi (33.23/km^{2})
- Time zone: UTC-6 (CST)
  - Summer (DST): UTC-5 (CDT)
- ZIP code: 58426
- Area code: 701
- FIPS code: 38-16380
- GNIS feature ID: 1035979

Courtenay is a city in Stutsman County, North Dakota, United States. The population was 36 at the 2020 census. Courtenay was founded in 1893.

== Geography ==
According to the United States Census Bureau, the city has a total area of 0.44 square miles (1.14 km^{2}), all land.

== Demographics ==
Historical population
Census	Pop.	Note	%±
1910	539		—
1920	490		−9.1%
1930	350		−28.6%
1940	297		−15.1%
1950	229		−22.9%
1960	168		−26.6%
1970	125		−25.6%
1980	110		−12.0%
1990	70		−36.4%
2000	53		−24.3%
2010	45		−15.1%
2020	36		−20.0%
2021 (est.)	40		11.1%
U.S. Decennial Census; 2020 Census

=== 2010 census ===
As of the census of 2010, there were 45 people, 21 households, and 13 families residing in the city. The population density was 102.3 inhabitants per square mile (39.5/km^{2}). There were 26 housing units at an average density of 59.1 per square mile (22.8/km^{2}). The racial makeup of the city was 100.0% White.

There were 21 households, of which 14.3% had children under the age of 18 living with them, 57.1% were married couples living together, 4.8% had a male householder with no wife present, and 38.1% were non-families. 38.1% of all households were made up of individuals, and 14.3% had someone living alone who was 65 years of age or older. The average household size was 2.14 and the average family size was 2.85.

The median age in the city was 50.5 years. 20% of residents were under the age of 18; 8.8% were between the ages of 18 and 24; 13.3% were from 25 to 44; 51.2% were from 45 to 64; and 6.7% were 65 years of age or older. The gender makeup of the city was 51.1% male and 48.9% female.

=== 2000 census ===
As of the census of 2000, there were 53 people, 24 households, and 15 families residing in the city. The population density was 120.4 inhabitants per square mile (46.5/km^{2}). There were 30 housing units at an average density of 68.2 per square mile (26.3/km^{2}). The racial makeup of the city was 100.00% White.

There were 24 households, out of which 29.2% had children under the age of 18 living with them, 50.0% were married couples living together, 4.2% had a female householder with no husband present, and 37.5% were non-families. 37.5% of all households were made up of individuals, and 20.8% had someone living alone who was 65 years of age or older. The average household size was 2.21 and the average family size was 2.87.

In the city, the population was spread out, with 20.8% under the age of 18, 3.8% from 18 to 24, 30.2% from 25 to 44, 24.5% from 45 to 64, and 20.8% who were 65 years of age or older. The median age was 44 years. For every 100 females, there were 112.0 males. For every 100 females age 18 and over, there were 100.0 males.

The median income for a household in the city was $25,938, and the median income for a family was $48,125. Males had a median income of $26,250 versus $50,625 for females. The per capita income for the city was $19,276. There were no families and 5.6% of the population living below the poverty line, including no under eighteens and 33.3% of those over 64.

== Climate ==
This climatic region is typified by large seasonal temperature differences, with warm to hot (and often humid) summers and cold (sometimes severely cold) winters. According to the Köppen Climate Classification system, Courtenay has a humid continental climate, abbreviated "Dfb" on climate maps.
