= Baldhill Dam =

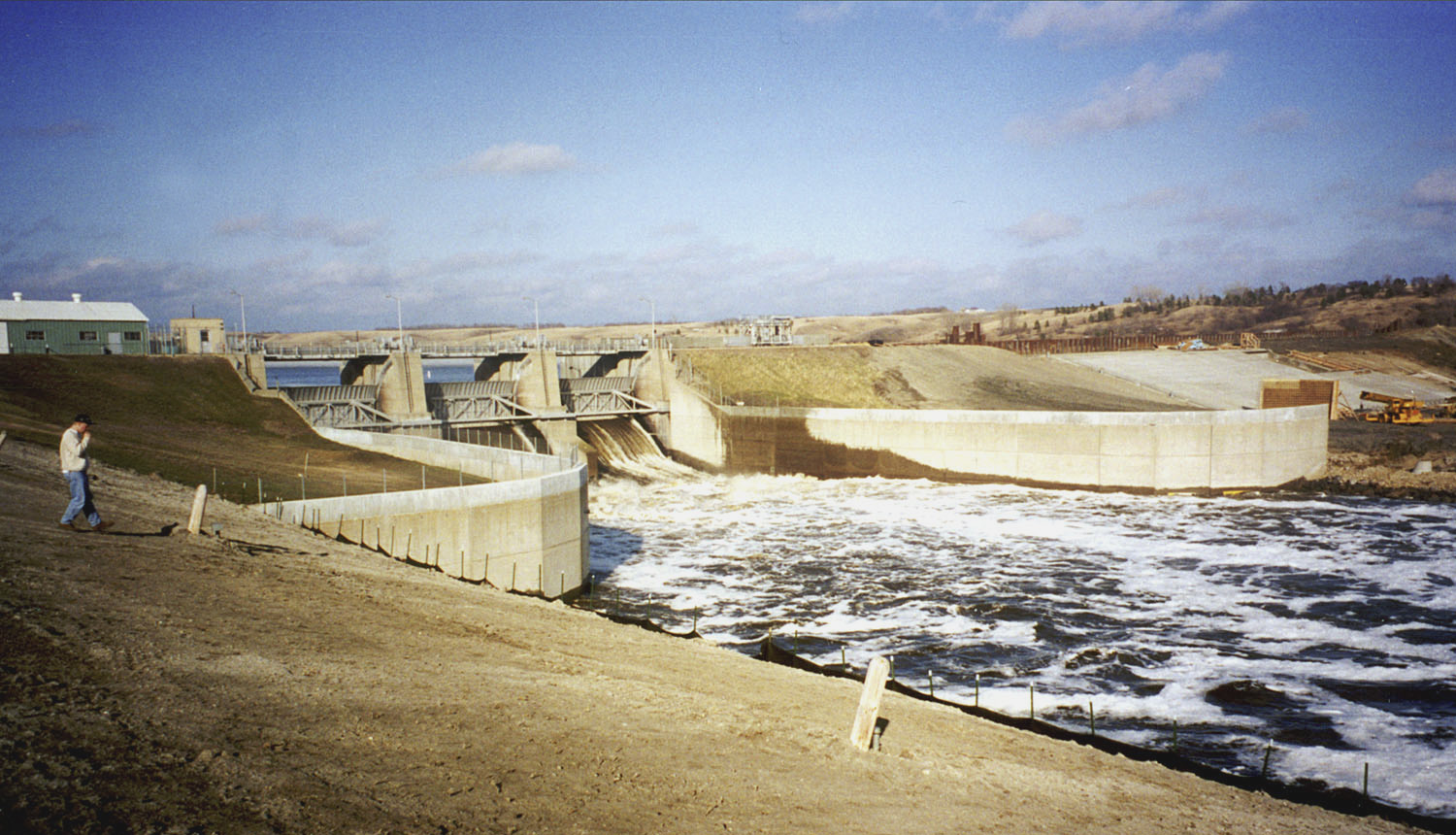
- Baldhill Dam

- Location within North Dakota
- Country: United States
- Location: Barnes County, North Dakota
- Coordinates: 47°02′08″N 98°04′50″W
- Status: Operational
- Opening date: 1951; 75 years ago
- Owners: U.S. Army Corps of Engineers, St. Paul District

Dam and spillways
- Type of dam: Earthen
- Impounds: Sheyenne River
- Height: 60 ft (18 m)
- Length: 1,800 ft (550 m)
- Spillways: 3 tainter gates

Reservoir
- Creates: Lake Ashtabula
- Total capacity: 156,000 acre⋅ft (192,000,000 m^{3})
- Surface area: 5,234 acres (2,118 ha)
- Maximum length: 27 mi (43 km)
- Normal elevation: 1,263 ft (385 m)
- Website; U.S. Army Corps of Engineers - Baldhill Dam

Baldhill Dam is a dam on the Sheyenne River in Barnes County, North Dakota, in the United States. It creates Lake Ashtabula, located in Barnes County about 10 miles (16 km) north-northwest of Valley City in the eastern part of North Dakota.

== Baldhill Dam ==
The United States Army Corps of Engineers constructed the earthen and concrete Baldhill Dam in 1951. It has three tainter gates, a height of 60 feet (18 m), and a length of 1,800 feet (549 m) at its crest. It impounds the Sheyenne River for irrigation water storage and for flood control. The Army Corps of Engineers, St. Paul District, owns and operates the dam.

== Lake Ashtabula ==
The reservoir the dam creates, Lake Ashtabula, is a 27-mile (43 km) long riverine lake oriented north to south. The name "Ashtabula" is a Native American word meaning "Fish River." The lake has a water surface area of 5,234 acres (2,118 hectares), a maximum capacity of 156,000 acre-feet (192,000,000 m^{3}), and normal storage of 69,500 acre-feet (85,700,000 m^{3}). Popular for recreation, Lake Ashtabula contains walleye, northern pike, white bass, yellow perch, and black bullheads. The Corps of Engineers maintains seven recreation areas around the lake.
