= Rogers Township, North Dakota =

Civil township in North Dakota, U.S.

Coordinates: 47°06′10″N 98°08′24″W

Rogers Township is a civil township in Barnes County, North Dakota, United States. As of the 2000 census, its population was 42.
