= Sanborn, North Dakota =

- City
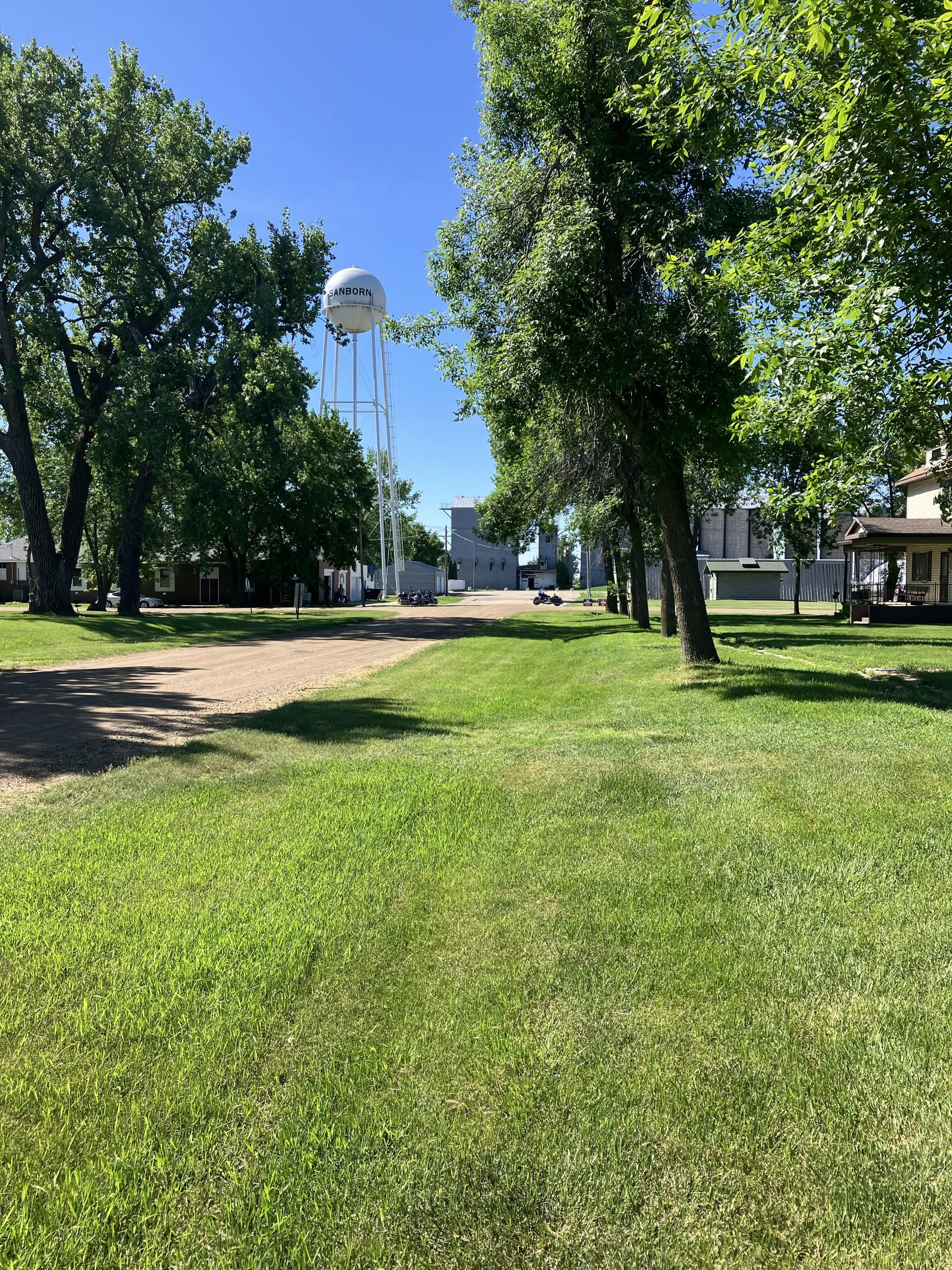

- Location of Sanborn, North Dakota

- Location within North Dakota
- Coordinates: 46°56′33″N 98°13′31″W
- Country: United States
- State: North Dakota
- County: Barnes
- Founded: 1879

Area
  - Total: 0.60 sq mi (1.55 km^{2})
  - Land: 0.60 sq mi (1.55 km^{2})
  - Water: 0 sq mi (0.00 km^{2})
- Elevation: 1,450 ft (442 m)

Population (2020)
  - Total: 161
  - Estimate (2022): 159
  - Density: 268.5/sq mi (103.66/km^{2})
- Time zone: UTC-6 (Central (CST))
  - Summer (DST): UTC-5 (CDT)
- ZIP code: 58480
- Area code: 701
- FIPS code: 38-70380
- GNIS feature ID: 1031334

Sanborn is a city in Barnes County, North Dakota, United States. The population was 161 at the 2020 census. Sanborn was founded in 1879.

== History ==
A post office has been in operation at Sanborn since 1879. The city was named in honor of J. N. Sanborn, an early settler. The town was an early contender for the county seat of Barnes County, but lost this role to Valley City in 1880. Its population declined after better roads allowed nearby farmers to trade in Valley City instead.

== Geography ==
Sanborn is located at 46°56′33″N 98°13′31″W (46.942638, -98.225227).

According to the United States Census Bureau, the city has a total area of 0.55 square miles (1.42 km^{2}), all land.

== Demographics ==
Historical population
Census	Pop.	Note	%±
1890	227		—
1900	259		14.1%
1910	390		50.6%
1920	391		0.3%
1930	343		−12.3%
1940	366		6.7%
1950	324		−11.5%
1960	263		−18.8%
1970	255		−3.0%
1980	237		−7.1%
1990	164		−30.8%
2000	194		18.3%
2010	192		−1.0%
2020	161		−16.1%
2022 (est.)	159		−1.2%
U.S. Decennial Census; 2020 Census

=== 2010 census ===
As of the census of 2010, there were 192 people, 73 households, and 58 families living in the city. The population density was 349.1 inhabitants per square mile (134.8/km^{2}). There were 80 housing units at an average density of 145.5 per square mile (56.2/km^{2}). The racial makeup of the city was 99.0% White and 1.0% from two or more races.

There were 73 households, of which 34.2% had children under the age of 18 living with them, 69.9% were married couples living together, 5.5% had a female householder with no husband present, 4.1% had a male householder with no wife present, and 20.5% were non-families. 15.1% of all households were made up of individuals, and 5.5% had someone living alone who was 65 years of age or older. The average household size was 2.63 and the average family size was 2.93.

The median age in the city was 44 years. 26% of residents were under the age of 18; 5.3% were between the ages of 18 and 24; 21.5% were from 25 to 44; 36% were from 45 to 64; and 11.5% were 65 years of age or older. The gender makeup of the city was 51.0% male and 49.0% female.

=== 2000 census ===
As of the census of 2000, there were 194 people, 74 households, and 54 families living in the city. The population density was 357.0 inhabitants per square mile (137.8/km^{2}). There were 80 housing units at an average density of 147.2 per square mile (56.8/km^{2}). The racial makeup of the city was 97.94% White, 1.03% African American, 0.52% Native American, and 0.52% from two or more races.

There were 74 households, out of which 36.5% had children under the age of 18 living with them, 63.5% were married couples living together, 9.5% had a female householder with no husband present, and 25.7% were non-families. 20.3% of all households were made up of individuals, and 8.1% had someone living alone who was 65 years of age or older. The average household size was 2.62 and the average family size was 3.07.

In the city, the population was spread out, with 28.4% under the age of 18, 5.7% from 18 to 24, 27.8% from 25 to 44, 26.8% from 45 to 64, and 11.3% who were 65 years of age or older. The median age was 37 years. For every 100 females, there were 84.8 males. For every 100 females age 18 and over, there were 85.3 males.

The median income for a household in the city was $30,417, and the median income for a family was $33,750. Males had a median income of $26,563 versus $19,375 for females. The per capita income for the city was $13,355. None of the families and 2.6% of the population were living below the poverty line, including no under eighteens and 12.8% of those over 64.
