= Pierce Township, Barnes County, North Dakota =

Civil township in North Dakota, U.S.

Coordinates: 47°11′23″N 98°23′38″W

Pierce Township is a civil township in Barnes County, North Dakota, United States. As of the 2000 census, its population was 91.
