= Rogers, North Dakota =

- City
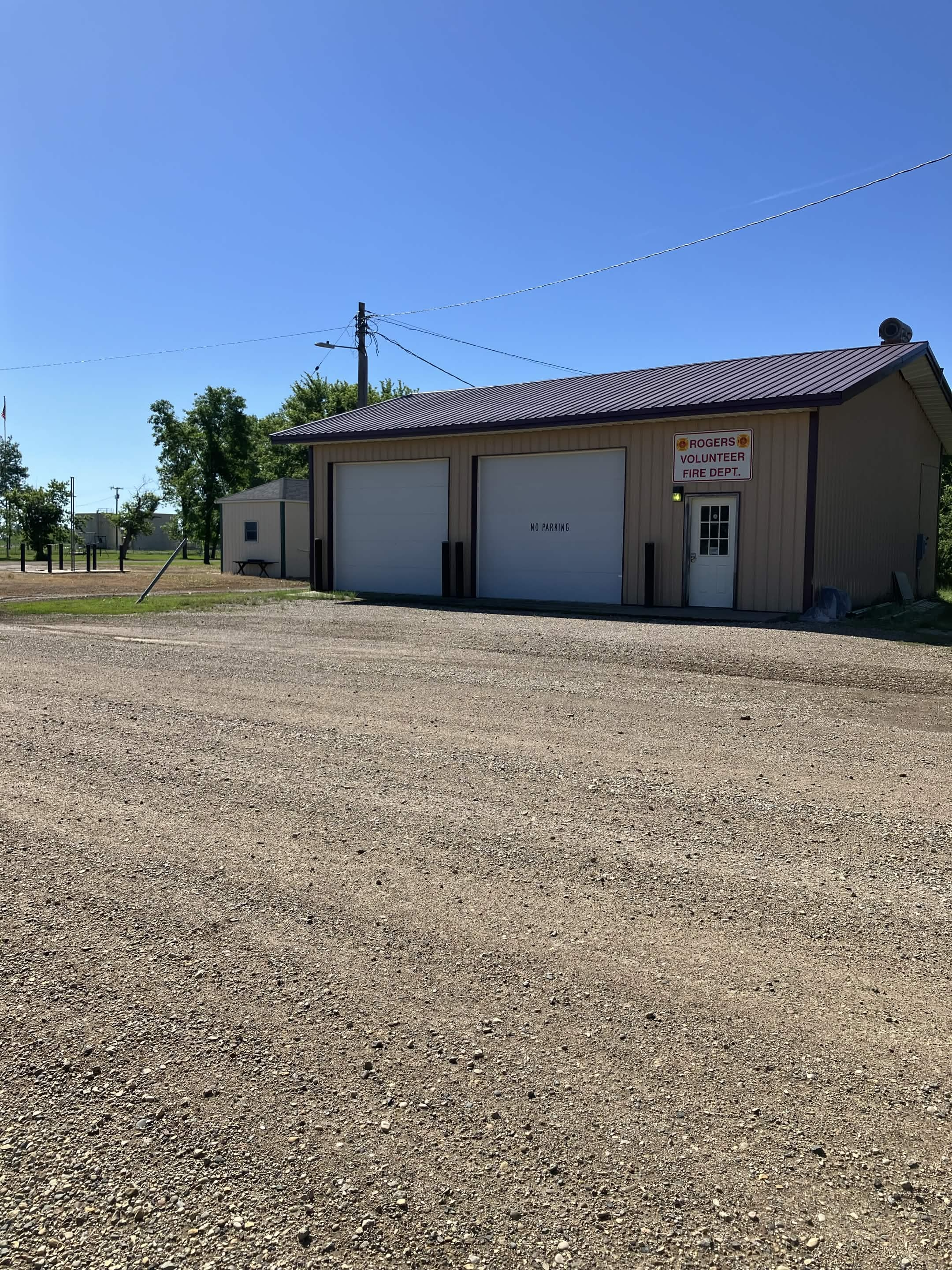

- Location of Rogers, North Dakota

- Location within North Dakota
- Coordinates: 47°04′19″N 098°12′04″W
- Country: United States
- State: North Dakota
- County: Barnes
- Founded: 1897

Area
  - Total: 0.98 sq mi (2.55 km^{2})
  - Land: 0.98 sq mi (2.55 km^{2})
  - Water: 0 sq mi (0.00 km^{2})
- Elevation: 1,427 ft (435 m)

Population (2020)
  - Total: 49
  - Density: 49.8/sq mi (19.22/km^{2})
- Time zone: UTC-6 (CST)
  - Summer (DST): UTC-5 (CDT)
- ZIP code: 58479
- Area code: 701
- FIPS code: 38-67620
- GNIS feature ID: 1030954

Rogers is a city in Barnes County, North Dakota, United States. The population was 49 at the 2020 census. Rogers was founded in 1897.

== Geography ==
According to the United States Census Bureau, the city has a total area of 0.98 square miles (2.54 km^{2}), all land.

== Demographics ==
Historical population
Census	Pop.	Note	%±
1920	173		—
1930	169		−2.3%
1940	174		3.0%
1950	150		−13.8%
1960	119		−20.7%
1970	96		−19.3%
1980	68		−29.2%
1990	69		1.5%
2000	61		−11.6%
2010	46		−24.6%
2020	49		6.5%
2021 (est.)	49		0.0%
U.S. Decennial Census; 2020 Census

=== 2010 census ===
As of the census of 2010, there were 46 people, 21 households, and 13 families living in the city. The population density was 46.9 inhabitants per square mile (18.1/km^{2}). There were 28 housing units at an average density of 28.6 per square mile (11.0/km^{2}). The racial makeup of the city was 100.0% White.

There were 21 households, of which 33.3% had children under the age of 18 living with them, 42.9% were married couples living together, 19.0% had a female householder with no husband present, and 38.1% were non-families. 33.3% of all households were made up of individuals, and 19% had someone living alone who was 65 years of age or older. The average household size was 2.19 and the average family size was 2.85.

The median age in the city was 40.5 years. 28.3% of residents were under the age of 18; 0% were between the ages of 18 and 24; 26% were from 25 to 44; 23.9% were from 45 to 64; and 21.7% were 65 years of age or older. The gender makeup of the city was 58.7% male and 41.3% female.

=== 2000 census ===
As of the census of 2000, there were 61 people, 26 households, and 15 families living in the city. The population density was 62.1 inhabitants per square mile (24.0/km^{2}). There were 29 housing units at an average density of 29.5 per square mile (11.4/km^{2}). The racial makeup of the city was 100.00% White.

There were 26 households, out of which 19.2% had children under the age of 18 living with them, 53.8% were married couples living together, 3.8% had a female householder with no husband present, and 42.3% were non-families. 42.3% of all households were made up of individuals, and 11.5% had someone living alone who was 65 years of age or older. The average household size was 2.35 and the average family size was 3.33.

In the city, the population was spread out, with 23.0% under the age of 18, 8.2% from 18 to 24, 19.7% from 25 to 44, 26.2% from 45 to 64, and 23.0% who were 65 years of age or older. The median age was 44 years. For every 100 females, there were 165.2 males. For every 100 females age 18 and over, there were 161.1 males.

The median income for a household in the city was $41,250, and the median income for a family was $53,750. Males had a median income of $47,500 versus $17,500 for females. The per capita income for the city was $18,380. There were 4.5% of families and 2.9% of the population living below the poverty line, including no under eighteens and none of those over 64.

== Climate ==
This climatic region is typified by large seasonal temperature differences, with warm to hot (and often humid) summers and cold (sometimes severely cold) winters. According to the Köppen Climate Classification system, Rogers has a humid continental climate, abbreviated "Dfb" on climate maps.
