= North Dakota Highway 1 =

Highway in North Dakota

North Dakota Highway 1
- ND 1 highlighted in red

Route information
- Maintained by NDDOT
- Length: 230.433 mi (370.846 km)
- Existed: 1939–present

Major junctions
- South end: SD 37 near Ludden
- I-94 / US 52 near Valley City; ND 200 near Cooperstown; US 2 in Lakota; ND 5 in Langdon
- North end: PTH 31 at the Canadian border in Maida

Location
- Country: United States
- State: North Dakota
- Counties: Dickey, LaMoure, Barnes, Griggs, Nelson, Walsh, Cavalier

Highway system
- North Dakota State Highway System; Interstate; US; State
← ND 1806	→ US 2

North Dakota Highway 1 (ND 1) is a major north–south highway in North Dakota. It runs from Manitoba Highway 31 in Maida to South Dakota Highway 37 south of Ludden. It is 230 miles (370 km) in length.

== Route description ==
ND 1 enters North Dakota as a continuation on South Dakota Highway 37 five miles south of ND 11. After a concurrency with this road that heads east for three miles, then north for seven miles, ND 1 continues north for two miles before entering the city of Oakes. Six miles north of Oakes, the route begins a concurrency of about 10½ miles with ND 13. This concurrency travels almost due north and ends in Verona. Six miles north of Verona, ND 1 intersects with the western terminus of ND 27. Thirteen miles farther north, the highway intersects ND 46. A little more than nineteen miles north of this intersection, west of Valley City, ND 1 begins a concurrency with Interstate 94 and US 52. The three highways travel west for about six miles before I-94 and US 52 continue west and ND 1 turns north.

Eleven miles north of the concurrency, ND 1 enters the western portion of Rogers. A mile north of Rogers, the route serves as the eastern terminus of ND 9. About six miles north of here, ND 1 enters Dazey and intersects ND 26. Eight miles north of the ND 26 intersection, ND 1 enters Hannaford. About ten miles north of Hannaford and two miles west of Cooperstown (which ND 1 never enters), the highway begins a concurrency with North Dakota's longest state highway, ND 200. Six miles farther west, ND 200 and ND 1 part. ND 1 heads north for four miles, west for a mile, and north for three miles before intersecting ND 65 just east of Binford. About sixteen miles north of here, ND 1 intersects ND 15 outside Pekin. About twenty miles north of here is an intersection with US 2 and the city of Lakota.

North of Lakota, ND 1 travels just northeast of Brocket. Six miles north of Brocket is the community of Lawton. About eight miles north of Lawton, ND 1 intersects ND 17. Twelve miles north of that intersection, the highway enters Nekoma. Just less than five miles north of Nekoma, ND 1 intersects ND 66. Nine miles farther north, ND 1 enters Langdon. In Langdon, ND 1 intersects ND 5. The remaining sixteen miles of this highway in North Dakota and the United States feature intersections with a couple of county roads before the Canadian border. ND 1 is continued into Manitoba, Canada, as Manitoba Highway 31.

== History ==
North Dakota Highway 1 was assigned by 1926 as a highway from the Canada border north of Pembina to the South Dakota border. This highway became part of US 81 in 1927, and Highway 1 was reassigned as a renumbering of North Dakota Highway 12 from Langdon to South Dakota to avoid conflict with US 12. The highway was extended north to Canada by 1937. It remains in this alignment today.

== Major intersections ==
County	Location	mi	km	Destinations	Notes
Brown		0.000	0.000	SD 37 south – Hecla	Continuation into South Dakota
Dickey		5.178	8.333	ND 11 west – Ellendale	Southern end of ND 11 concurrency
Dickey		14.933	24.032	ND 11 east – Cogswell	Northern end of ND 11 concurrency
Dickey		22.939	36.917	ND 13 east – Gwinner	Southern end of ND 13 concurrency
LaMoure	Verona	33.058	53.202	ND 13 west – LaMoure	Northern end of ND 13 concurrency
LaMoure		38.344	61.709	ND 27 east – Lisbon	Western terminus of ND 27
LaMoure–Barnes county line		51.405	82.728	ND 46 – Gackle, Enderlin	
Barnes		70.926	114.144	I-94 east / US 52 – Fargo	Eastern end of concurrency with I-94 and US 52; exit 288
Barnes		76.423	122.991	I-94 west / US 52 – Bismarck	Western end of concurrency with I-94 and US 52; exit 283
Barnes		89.543	144.105	ND 9 west – Wimbledon	Eastern terminus of ND 9
Barnes	Dazey	95.662	153.953	ND 26 east – Pillsbury	Western terminus of ND 26
Griggs		113.714	183.005	ND 200 east – Cooperstown	Eastern end of ND 200 concurrency
Griggs		119.821	192.833	ND 200 west – Carrington	Western end of ND 200 concurrency
Griggs		128.493	206.789	ND 65 east – Jessie	Western terminus of ND 65
Nelson		145.217	233.704	ND 15 – Pekin, McVille	
Nelson	Lakota	162.802	262.004	US 2 – Devils Lake, Grand Forks	
Ramsey		189.521	305.004	ND 17 – Edmore, Adams	
Cavalier		204.890	329.738	ND 66 – Bisbee, Milton	
Cavalier	Langdon	213.926	344.281	ND 5 – Rocklake, Cavalier	
Division No. 4		230.433	370.846	PTH 31 north – Saint Claude, Portage la Prairie	Continuation into Manitoba, Canada
1.000 mi = 1.609 km; 1.000 km = 0.621 mi: Concurrency terminus
