= Manitoba Highway 31 =

Highway in Manitoba

Provincial Trunk Highway 31
- PTH 30 highlighted in red

Route information
- Maintained by Department of Infrastructure
- Length: 22 km (14 mi)
- Existed: 1959–present

Major junctions
- South end: ND 1 at the U.S. border in Windygates
- North end: PTH 3 / PR 240 near Darlingford

Location
- Country: Canada
- Province: Manitoba
- Rural municipalities: Pembina

Highway system
- Provincial highways in Manitoba; Winnipeg City Routes
← PTH 30	→ PTH 32

Provincial Trunk Highway 31 (PTH 31) is a provincial highway in the Canadian province of Manitoba. It is a short highway that runs from PTH 3 to the U.S. border where it becomes North Dakota State Highway 1. The entire highway lies within the Municipality of Pembina.

== Route description ==
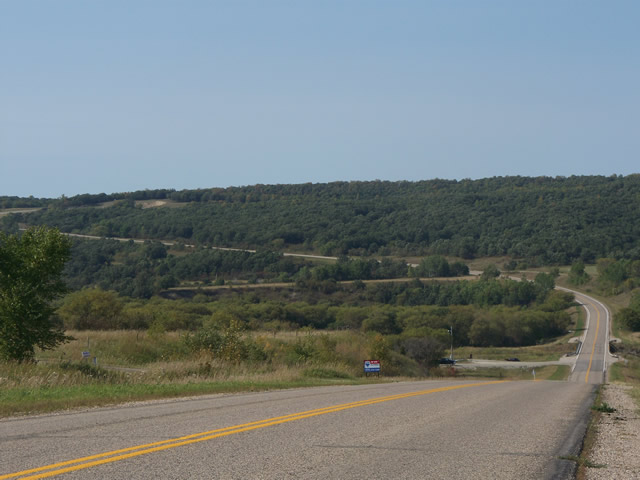
Highway 31 as it passes through the gorge created by the Pembina River

PTH 31 begins at the North Dakota border in Windygates, with the road continuing south into Maida and toward Langdon as North Dakota Highway 1 (ND 1). The highway curves northward, leaving Windygates and traveling through rural farmland for a few kilometers, where it crosses PR 201, providing access to nearby Pembina Valley Provincial Park. It now winds its way down, then back up, the Pembina River valley, where it crosses a bridge over the Pembina River. PTH 31 heads north through farmland for a few more kilometers before coming to an end at an intersection with PTH 3 (Boundary Commission Trail) just southeast of Darilngford. The road continues north as PR 240.

The entire length of Manitoba Highway 31 is a rural, paved, two-lane highway.

== History ==
Highway 31 was the designation of the route connecting PTH 16 (then known as Highway 4) at Russell to PTH 5 in Roblin. In 1947, it extended north via Benito to Highway 10 at Swan River, replacing Highway 6. The section from Roblin to south of Benito was under construction; it opened in 1948. In 1954, the section of PTH 83 between the Trans-Canada Highway and Birtle was constructed and opened to traffic. With this addition, PTH 83 was also extended to Swan River, replacing Highway 31.

PTH 31 was designated to its current route in 1959.

== Major intersections ==
Division	Location	km	mi	Destinations	Notes
Pembina	Windygates	0	0.0	ND 1 south – Langdon	Continuation into North Dakota
Pembina	Windygates	0	0.0	Canada–United States border at the Maida–Windygates Border Crossing	
Pembina		2	1.2	PR 201 – Snowflake, Osterwick	
Pembina		22	14	PTH 3 (Boundary Commission Trail) – Manitou, Morden PR 240 north – St. Claude	Continues as PR 240
1.000 mi = 1.609 km; 1.000 km = 0.621 mi: Route transition
