= North Dakota Highway 26 =

State highway in North Dakota, US

North Dakota Highway 26

Route information
- Maintained by NDDOT
- Length: 21.464 mi (34.543 km)
- Existed: 1931–present

Major junctions
- West end: ND 1 in Dazey
- East end: ND 32 in Pillsbury

Location
- Country: United States
- State: North Dakota
- Counties: Barnes

Highway system
- North Dakota State Highway System; Interstate; US; State
← ND 25	→ ND 27

North Dakota Highway 26 (ND 26) is a 21.464-mile-long (34.543 km) east–west state highway in the U.S. state of North Dakota. ND 26's western terminus is at ND 1 in Dazey, and the eastern terminus is at ND 32 in Pillsbury.

== Major intersections ==
The entire route is in Barnes County.

Location	mi	km	Destinations	Notes
Dazey	0.000	0.000	ND 1 – Rogers, Hannaford, CR 4 west – Wimbledon	Western terminus
Sibley Trail Township			CR 21 south – Ashtubula Crossing, Valley City	
Baldwin Township			CR 27 north – Luverne	
Pillsbury	21.464	34.543	ND 32 – Finley, Oriska	Eastern terminus
1.000 mi = 1.609 km; 1.000 km = 0.621 mi
