= McLeod, North Dakota =

McLeod
- Census-designated place & Unincorporated community
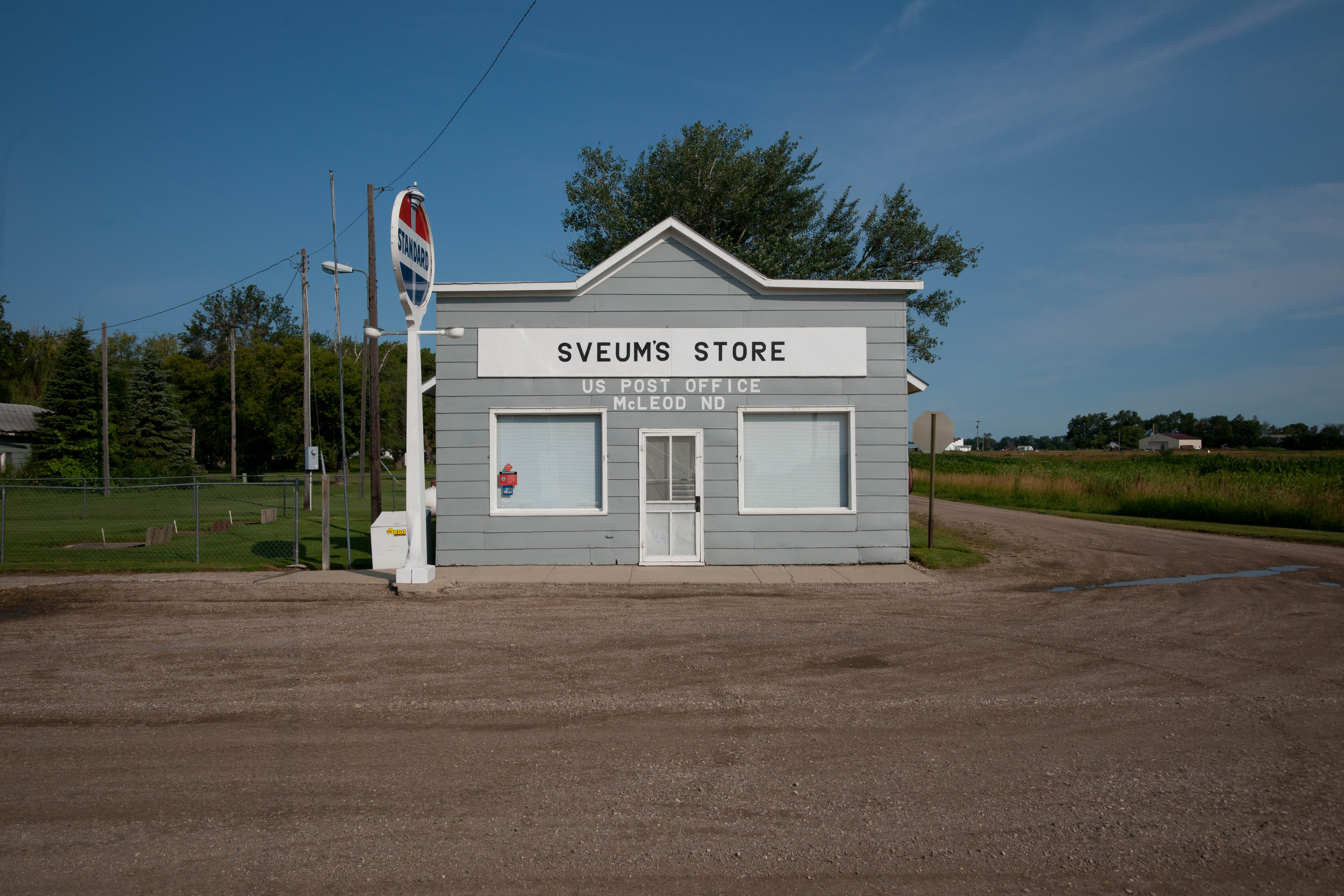
- Sveums Store and US Post Office - McLeod

- Location within the state of North Dakota
- Coordinates: 46°23′19″N 97°17′55″W
- Country: United States
- State: North Dakota
- County: Ransom

Area
  - Total: 0.77 sq mi (2.00 km^{2})
  - Land: 0.77 sq mi (2.00 km^{2})
  - Water: 0 sq mi (0.00 km^{2})
- Elevation: 1,076 ft (328 m)

Population (2020)
  - Total: 22
  - Density: 28.4/sq mi (10.98/km^{2})
- Time zone: UTC-6 (Central (CST))
  - Summer (DST): UTC-5 (CDT)
- ZIP codes: 58057
- Area code: 701
- FIPS code: 38-49540
- GNIS feature ID: 2584351

McLeod (also Sandoun) is a census designated place in eastern Ransom County, North Dakota, United States. An unincorporated community, it was designated as part of the U.S. Census Bureau's Participant Statistical Areas Program on March 31, 2010. As of the 2020 census, McLeod had a population of 22.

The community lies along North Dakota Highway 27 east of the city of Lisbon, the county seat of Ransom County. Originally named Sandoun for the many sand dunes in the area, it was renamed McLeod for local realtor J. J. McLeod.

== Demographics ==
Historical population
Census	Pop.	Note	%±
2020	22		—
U.S. Decennial Census

== Climate ==
This climatic region is typified by large seasonal temperature differences, with warm to hot (and often humid) summers and cold (sometimes severely cold) winters. According to the Köppen Climate Classification system, McLeod has a humid continental climate, abbreviated "Dfb" on climate maps.

Climate data for McLeod 3E, North Dakota (1991–2020 normals, extremes 1912–present)
Month	Jan	Feb	Mar	Apr	May	Jun	Jul	Aug	Sep	Oct	Nov	Dec	Year
Record high °F (°C)	60 (16)	66 (19)	86 (30)	99 (37)	106 (41)	105 (41)	114 (46)	107 (42)	105 (41)	97 (36)	78 (26)	68 (20)	114 (46)
Mean daily maximum °F (°C)	19.0 (−7.2)	24.0 (−4.4)	37.6 (3.1)	54.5 (12.5)	68.7 (20.4)	78.0 (25.6)	82.5 (28.1)	81.4 (27.4)	72.7 (22.6)	56.8 (13.8)	39.1 (3.9)	24.8 (−4.0)	53.3 (11.8)
Daily mean °F (°C)	8.9 (−12.8)	13.5 (−10.3)	27.1 (−2.7)	43.0 (6.1)	56.7 (13.7)	66.8 (19.3)	71.1 (21.7)	69.2 (20.7)	60.2 (15.7)	45.4 (7.4)	29.5 (−1.4)	15.6 (−9.1)	42.2 (5.7)
Mean daily minimum °F (°C)	−1.3 (−18.5)	2.9 (−16.2)	16.7 (−8.5)	31.4 (−0.3)	44.6 (7.0)	55.7 (13.2)	59.7 (15.4)	57.0 (13.9)	47.6 (8.7)	33.9 (1.1)	19.9 (−6.7)	6.4 (−14.2)	31.2 (−0.4)
Record low °F (°C)	−41 (−41)	−41 (−41)	−30 (−34)	−7 (−22)	11 (−12)	27 (−3)	37 (3)	31 (−1)	15 (−9)	−12 (−24)	−28 (−33)	−36 (−38)	−41 (−41)
Average precipitation inches (mm)	0.62 (16)	0.72 (18)	1.00 (25)	1.67 (42)	2.89 (73)	4.52 (115)	3.48 (88)	2.63 (67)	2.56 (65)	2.16 (55)	0.85 (22)	0.89 (23)	23.99 (609)
Average precipitation days (≥ 0.01 in)	3.4	4.0	3.8	4.6	7.6	9.0	7.8	6.6	5.5	5.7	3.2	4.1	65.3
Source: NOAA
