= Maida–Windygates Border Crossing =

Canada–United States border crossing

- US Border Inspection Station at Maida, ND

Location
- Country: United States; Canada
- Location: ND 1 / PTH 31; US Port: 10947 North Dakota Highway 1, Langdon, North Dakota 58255; Canadian Port: Manitoba Highway 31, Darlingford, Manitoba R0G 0L0
- Coordinates: 49°00′00″N 98°21′54″W

Details
- Opened: 1930

Website
- US Canadian

The Maida–Windygates Border Crossing connects the cities of Langdon, North Dakota and Morden, Manitoba on the Canada–United States border. North Dakota Highway 1 on the American side joins Manitoba Highway 31 on the Canadian side.

== Canadian side ==
In terms of the region, the earliest customs service began at Snowflake in the 1880s, where the North-West Mounted Police (NWMP) collected duties, issued permits, and patrolled the border. A customs office existed at Mowbray from 1899–1908 under the administrative oversight of the Port of Winnipeg, at which time the Snowflake office opened. Mowbray reopened, operating 1926–1930, at which time the Windygates office opened about 9 kilometres (6 mi) eastward along the border.

In 1959, a driver and passenger died when their car crashed into the customs building. The present border station was built in 1963.

In 2020, the former border hours of 9 am–10 pm reduced, becoming 9 am–5 pm.

== US side ==
The early border station history at Maida is unclear, but an office was known to exist by the late 1930s. The border station that was constructed in 1961 was replaced in 2012. The construction of the new station required a local bar named Jacks Bar to be torn down. The once booming town of Maida has become a ghost town.

== See also ==
- List of Canada–United States border crossings
