= North Dakota Highway 27 =

State highway in North Dakota, U.S.

North Dakota Highway 27

Route information
- Maintained by NDDOT
- Length: 44.973 mi (72.377 km)
- Existed: 1926–present

Major junctions
- West end: ND 1 north of Verona
- ND 32 in Lisbon
- East end: ND 18 north of Wyndmere

Location
- Country: United States
- State: North Dakota
- Counties: LaMoure, Ransom, Richland

Highway system
- North Dakota State Highway System; Interstate; US; State
← ND 26	→ ND 28

North Dakota Highway 27 (ND 27) is a 44.973-mile-long (72.377 km) east–west state highway in the U.S. state of North Dakota. ND 27's western terminus is at ND 1 north of Verona, and the eastern terminus is at ND 18 north of Wyndmere.

== Major intersections ==
County	Location	mi	km	Destinations	Notes
LaMoure		0.000	0.000	ND 1 – Verona, Oakes, I-94	Western terminus
Ransom	Lisbon	18.999	30.576	ND 32 – Veteran’s Home	
Richland		44.973	72.377	ND 18 – Wyndmere, Lidgerwood, ND 46	Eastern terminus
1.000 mi = 1.609 km; 1.000 km = 0.621 mi
