= Fort Ransom State Park =

Park in North Dakota, USA

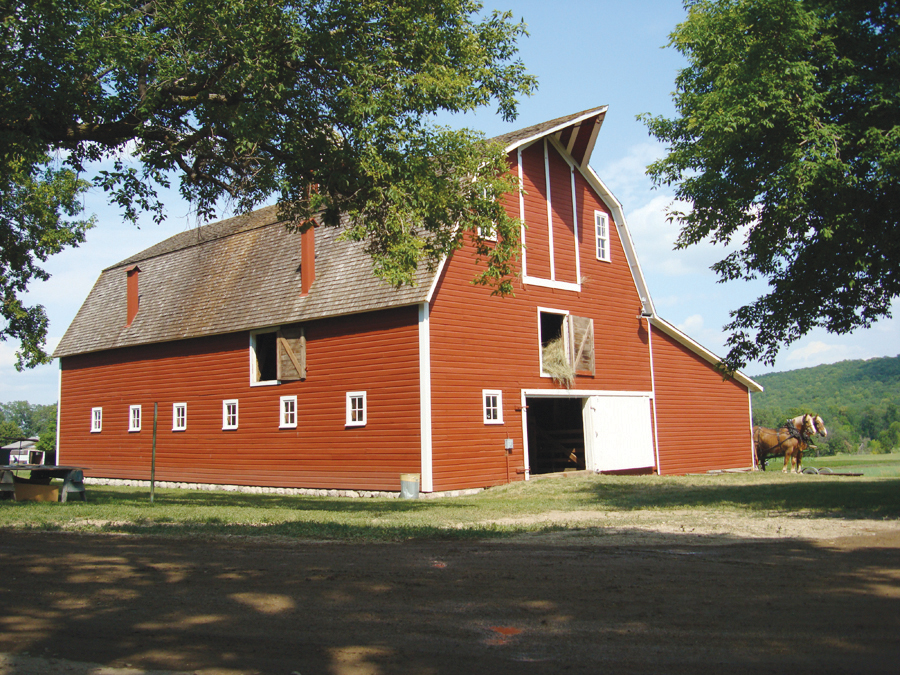
- Sunne Farm at Fort Ransom State Park

- Location within North Dakota
- Location: Ransom County, North Dakota, United States
- Nearest city: Fort Ransom, North Dakota
- Coordinates: 46°32′40″N 97°56′10″W
- Area: 933.78 acres (377.89 ha)
- Elevation: 1,135 ft (346 m)
- Established: 1976
- Administrator: North Dakota Parks and Recreation Department
- Designation: North Dakota state park
- Website: Official website

Fort Ransom State Park is a public recreation area located in the Sheyenne River Valley two miles north of the town of Fort Ransom in Ransom County, North Dakota. The state park preserves two homesteader farms: the Bjone House and the Andrew Sunne farm. The park is a featured site on the Sheyenne River Valley National Scenic Byway.

== Activities and amenities ==
The park features a visitors center with displays that interpret the lives of the area's 19th-century sodbusters and the Mound Builders who lived here from 5000 to 8000 years ago. Over 20 miles (32 km) of trails are available for hikers, bikers, equestrians, skiers, and snowshoers. The park also offers campsites and lodging, canoe and kayak rentals, picnicking facilities, and group facilities in the Sodbuster Building.
