= Carleton Opgaard =

American college and university administrator

President of Tacoma Community College
- In office 1983–1990

President of Dakota State University
- In office 1978–1983

President of Malaspina University-College
- In office 1969–1978
- Preceded by: Position established

Personal details
- Born: Carleton Myron Opgaard; February 18, 1929 Fort Ransom, North Dakota, U.S.
- Died: July 6, 2014 (aged 85) Tacoma, Washington, U.S.
- Education: Valley City State University (BA); University of Wyoming (MA); University of Washington (PhD)

Carleton Opgaard (February 18, 1929 – July 6, 2014) was an American college and university administrator and founding president of Malaspina College (now Vancouver Island University).

== Early life and education ==
Carleton Myron Opgaard was born in Fort Ransom, North Dakota, the son of immigrants from Norway. Opgaard obtained his bachelor's degree from Valley City State University in Valley City, North Dakota in 1952. Thereafter, he received his master's degree from the University of Wyoming in Laramie and his Ph.D. from the University of Washington in Seattle. He attended the University of Oslo in Norway as a Fulbright scholar.

== Career ==
In his initial administrative assignment, Opgaard was principal of Edmonds Woodway High School in Edmonds, Washington.

In 1969, he was the founding president of Malaspina University-College, now called Vancouver Island University in Nanaimo, British Columbia, Canada. During the centennial of the college, he was the president of Dakota State University (1978–1983) in Madison, South Dakota. He also served as president of Tacoma Community College in Tacoma, Washington, (1983–1990). He later served as interim president of Columbia Basin College and Edmonds College in Washington.

For his service to education, Carleton Opgaard received the Distinguished Alumnus Award from Valley City State University.

== Death ==
Opgaard died on July 6, 2014, in Tacoma, Washington.

== Selected works ==
- Waldemar Theodor Ager, Norwegian immigrant author in America (University of Wyoming, 1957)
