= T. J. Walker Historic District =

Historic district in North Dakota, United States

- T.J. Walker Historic District
- U.S. National Register of Historic Places
- U.S. Historic district
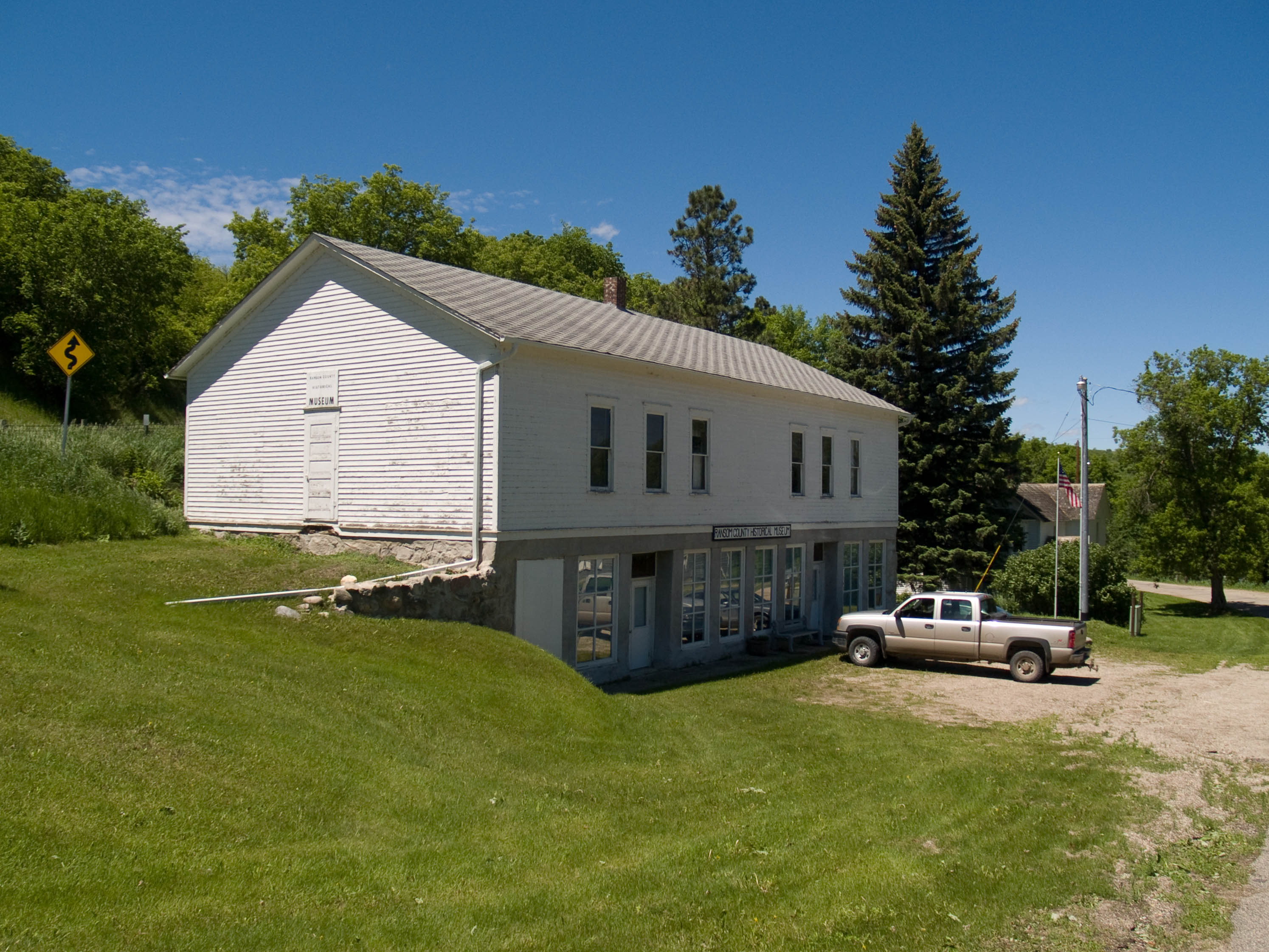
- The Walker Store, now the Ransom County Historical Museum

- Location within North Dakota Location within the United States
- Location: At Sheyenne River, Fort Ransom, North Dakota
- Area: 9.3 acres (3.8 ha)
- Built: 1880
- Built by: Walker, T.J.
- Architectural style: Queen Anne
- NRHP reference No.: 79001774
- Added to NRHP: December 5, 1979

The T.J. Walker Historic District at the Sheyenne River in Fort Ransom, North Dakota, United States, is a 9.3-acre (3.8 ha) historic district that includes resources dating to 1880. It was listed on the National Register of Historic Places in 1979.

The listed district includes "a complex of structures associated with pioneer miller and merchant Tyler James Walker".
