= Fort Ransom, North Dakota =

- Village
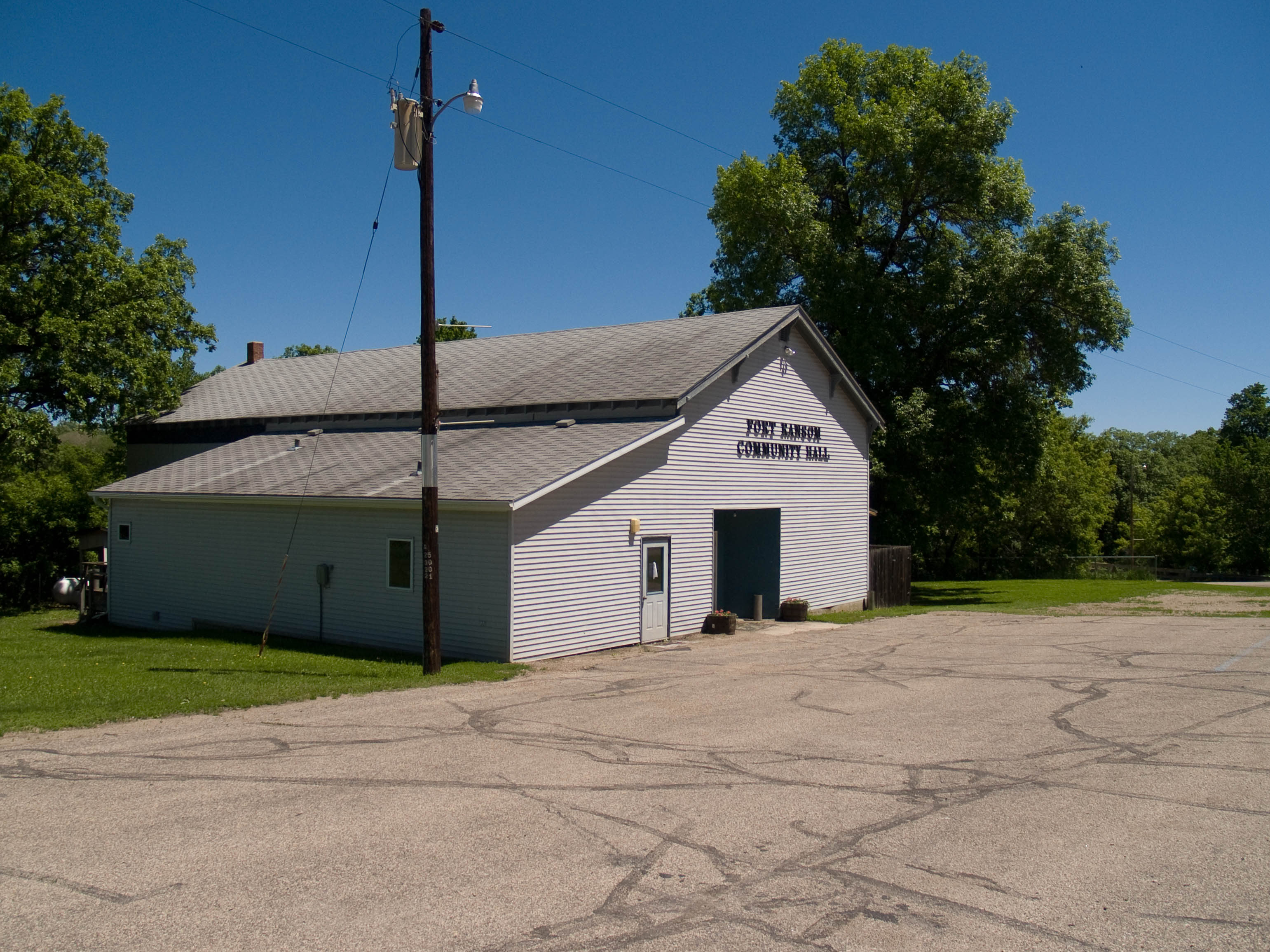
- Fort Ransom Community Hall

- Location of Fort Ransom, North Dakota
- Coordinates: 46°31′28″N 97°55′52″W
- Country: United States
- State: North Dakota
- County: Ransom
- Founded: 1880

Area
  - Total: 0.31 sq mi (0.80 km^{2})
  - Land: 0.31 sq mi (0.80 km^{2})
  - Water: 0 sq mi (0.00 km^{2})
- Elevation: 1,135 ft (346 m)

Population (2020)
  - Total: 91
  - Estimate (2024): 100
  - Density: 295.7/sq mi (114.17/km^{2})
- Time zone: UTC–6 (Central (CST))
  - Summer (DST): UTC–5 (CDT)
- ZIP Code: 58033
- Area code: 701
- FIPS code: 38-27580
- GNIS feature ID: 1036040

Fort Ransom is a village in Ransom County, North Dakota, United States. The population was 91 at the 2020 census. Fort Ransom was founded in 1880 with the first merchants arriving in 1878.

== Geography ==
Fort Ransom is located in the Sheyenne River valley. Fort Ransom State Park is located nearby.

According to the United States Census Bureau, the city has a total area of 0.30 square miles (0.78 km^{2}), all land. The only waterfall in North Dakota is located between Fort Ransom and Lisbon, ND.

== Demographics ==
Historical population
Census	Pop.	Note	%±
1980	99		—
1990	111		12.1%
2000	70		−36.9%
2010	77		10.0%
2020	91		18.2%
2024 (est.)	100		9.9%
U.S. Decennial Census; 2020 Census

=== 2010 census ===
As of the census of 2010, there were 77 people, 43 households, and 25 families residing in the city. The population density was 256.7 inhabitants per square mile (99.1/km^{2}). There were 64 housing units at an average density of 213.3 per square mile (82.4/km^{2}). The racial makeup of the city was 100.0% White. Hispanic or Latino of any race were 2.6% of the population.

There were 43 households, of which 7.0% had children under the age of 18 living with them, 53.5% were married couples living together, 2.3% had a female householder with no husband present, 2.3% had a male householder with no wife present, and 41.9% were non-families. 41.9% of all households were made up of individuals, and 23.3% had someone living alone who was 65 years of age or older. The average household size was 1.79 and the average family size was 2.32.

The median age in the city was 59.8 years. 5.2% of residents were under the age of 18; 3.9% were between the ages of 18 and 24; 7.8% were from 25 to 44; 44.2% were from 45 to 64; and 39% were 65 years of age or older. The gender makeup of the city was 50.6% male and 49.4% female.

=== 2000 census ===
As of the census of 2000, there were 70 people, 37 households, and 19 families residing in the city. The population density was 233.1 inhabitants per square mile (90.0/km^{2}). There were 44 housing units at an average density of 146.5 per square mile (56.6/km^{2}). The racial makeup of the city was 100.00% White.

There were 37 households, out of which 18.9% had children under the age of 18 living with them, 43.2% were married couples living together, 5.4% had a female householder with no husband present, and 48.6% were non-families. 48.6% of all households were made up of individuals, and 27.0% had someone living alone who was 65 years of age or older. The average household size was 1.89 and the average family size was 2.74.

In the city, the population was spread out, with 20.0% under the age of 18, 2.9% from 18 to 24, 20.0% from 25 to 44, 20.0% from 45 to 64, and 37.1% who were 65 years of age or older. The median age was 50 years. For every 100 females, there were 100.0 males. For every 100 females age 18 and over, there were 124.0 males.

The median income for a household in the city was $19,375, and the median income for a family was $31,250. Males had a median income of $23,125 versus $28,750 for females. The per capita income for the city was $14,242. There were 11.8% of families and 11.9% of the population living below the poverty line, including no under eighteens and 17.4% of those over 64.

== History ==
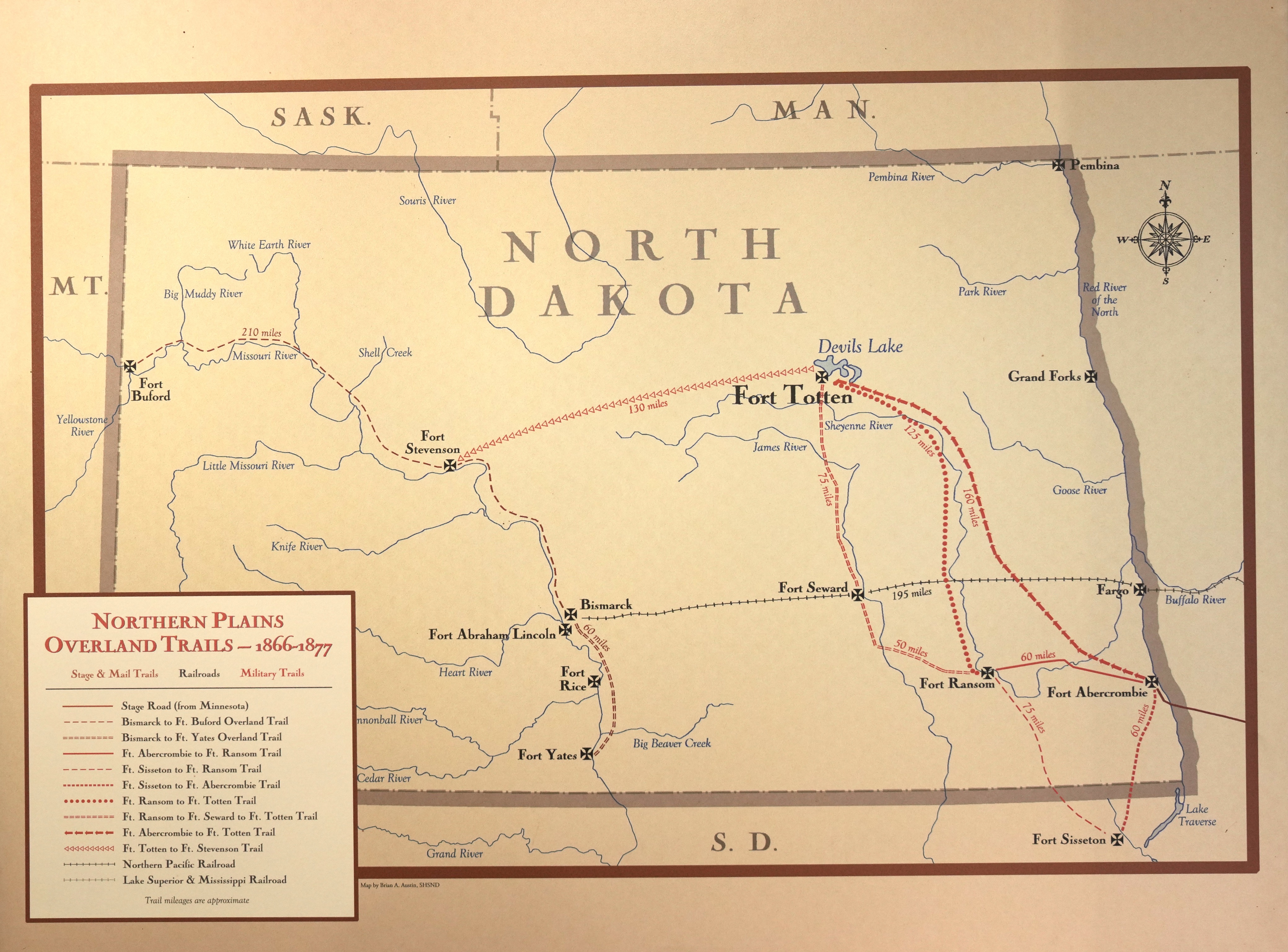
Northern Plains Overland Trails 1866-1877 map on display at the Fort Totten Historic Site

The Fort Ransom Military Post was established in 1867. It was built to protect settlers and railroad workers who were working on the Northern Pacific Railroad between Fargo and Bismarck. It was named for distinguished Civil War veteran Major General Thomas E.G. Ransom. The fort was built on top of Grizzly Bear Hill, a site chosen by Brigadier General Alfred H. Terry.

Fort Ransom was dismantled in 1872 and the materials were used to build Fort Seward at Jamestown, North Dakota, in Stutsman County. The army had determined that protection of the Northern Pacific Railroad crew at the James River crossing was a higher priority than protecting the overland route. The final disposition of the military reservation took place on July 14, 1880, when it was turned over to the Department of Interior for survey and sale to homesteaders.

The original site of the fort is located to the southwest of the town of Fort Ransom and three miles south of Fort Ransom State Park.

== Notable person ==
- Carleton Opgaard, founding president of Vancouver Island University

== See also ==
- T. J. Walker Historic District
