= Ransom County, North Dakota =

County in North Dakota, United States

- County
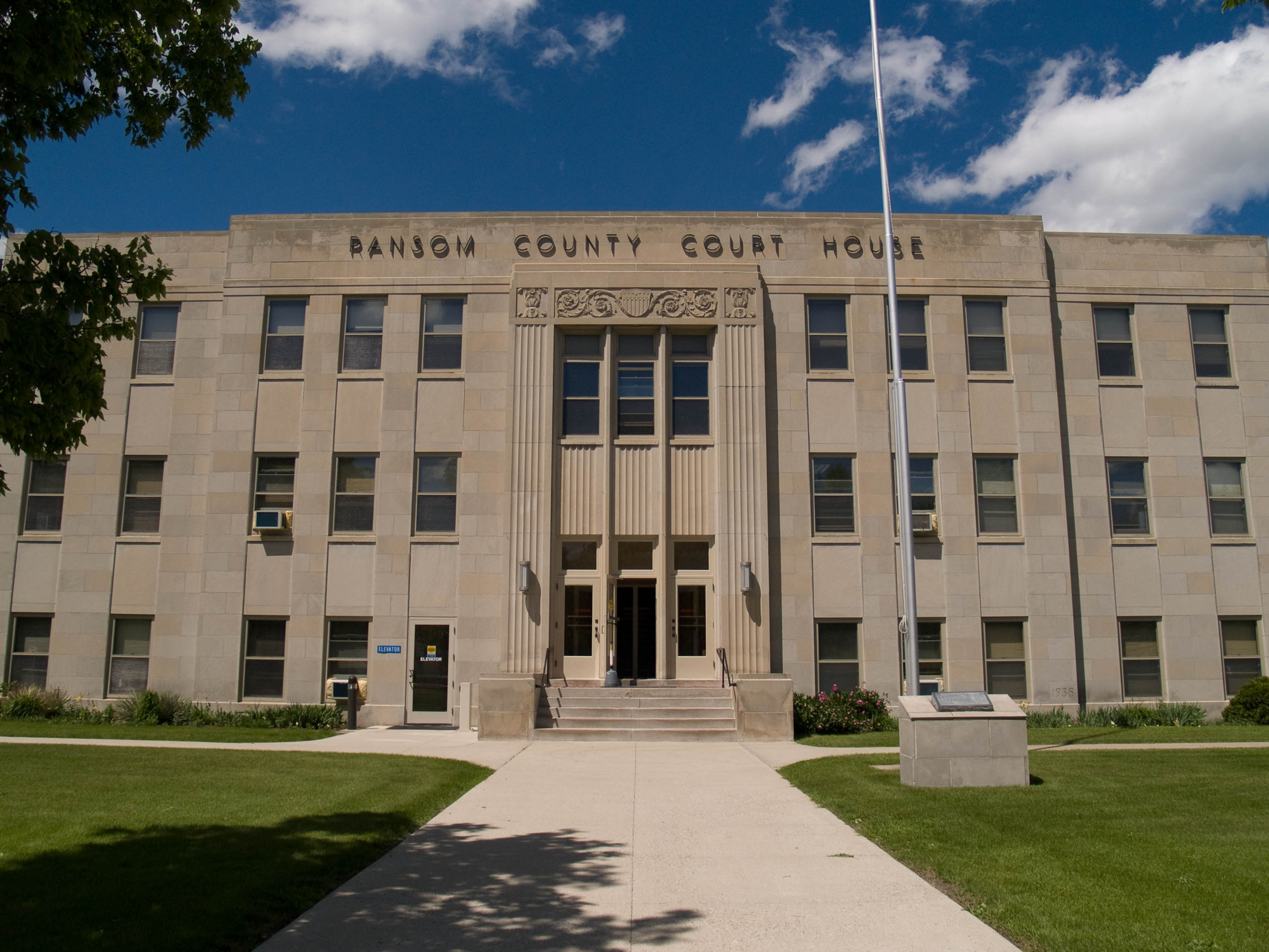
- The Ransom County Courthouse in Lisbon

- Location within the U.S. state of North Dakota
- Coordinates: 46.449276°N 97.647554°W
- Country: United States
- State: North Dakota
- Founded: January 4, 1873 (created); April 4, 1881 (organized)
- Named for: Fort Ransom
- Seat: Lisbon
- Largest city: Lisbon

Area
  - Total: 863.855 sq mi (2,237.37 km^{2})
  - Land: 862.472 sq mi (2,233.79 km^{2})
  - Water: 1.383 sq mi (3.58 km^{2}) 0.16%

Population (2020)
  - Total: 5,703
  - Estimate (2025): 5,617 ▼
  - Density: 6.5/sq mi (2.5/km^{2})
- Time zone: UTC−6 (Central)
  - Summer (DST): UTC−5 (CDT)
- Area code: 701
- Congressional district: At-large
- Website: ransomcountynd.net

Ransom County is a county in the U.S. state of North Dakota. As of the 2020 census, the population was 5,703, and was estimated to be 5,617 in 2025. The county seat and the largest city is Lisbon.

== History ==
The Dakota Territory legislature created Ransom County on January 4, 1873. It was so named due to its military fort, which had been named Fort Ransom for Civil War veteran Major General Thomas E.G. Ransom. The fort had operated between 1867 and 1872. The county was not organized at that time, nor was it attached to another county for administrative or judicial purposes. Its proposed boundaries were altered two times during 1881. On April 4, 1881, the county government was affected. The county's area was again reduced in 1883 when Sargent County was created. Ransom County has retained its present configuration since that time.

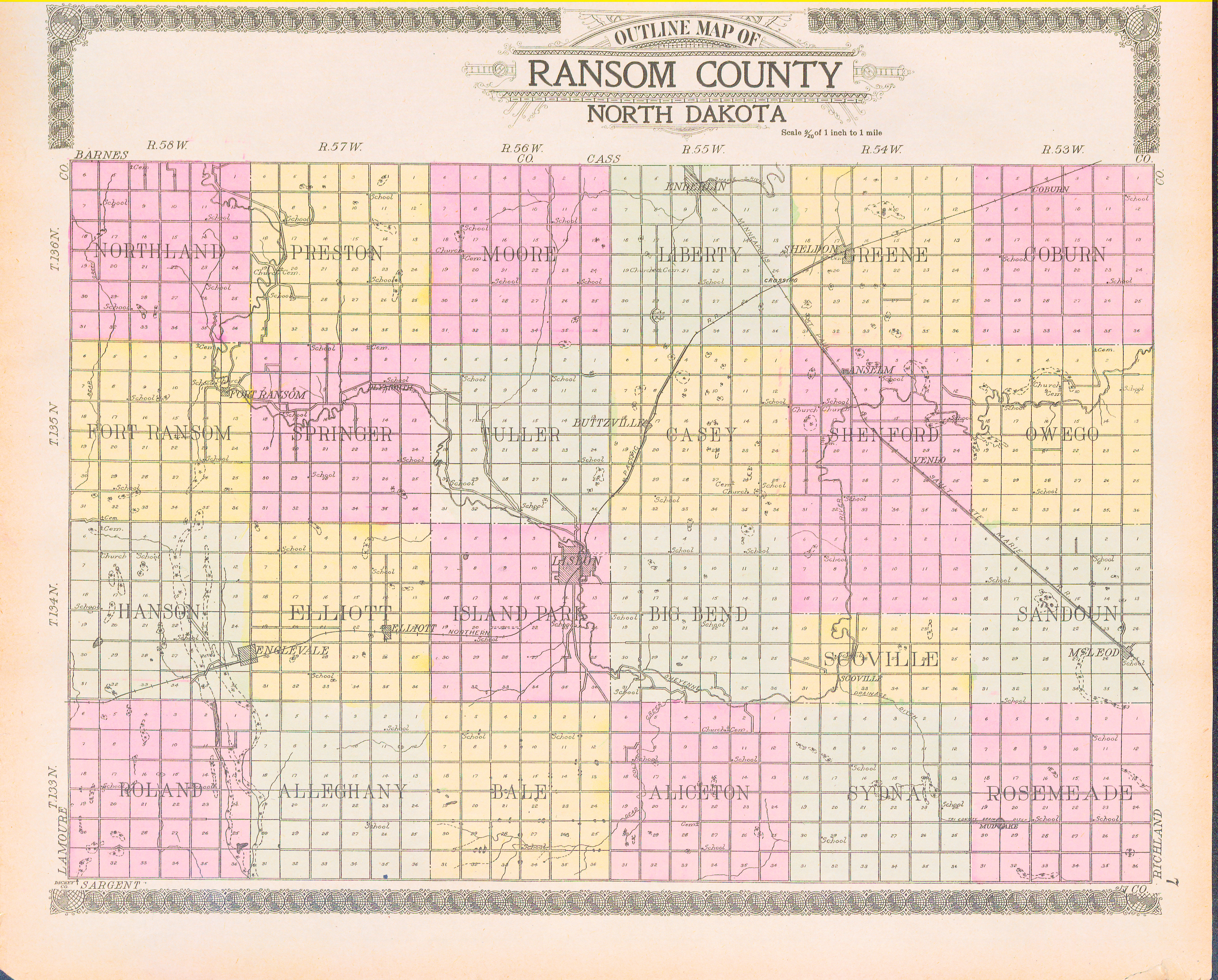
Outline map of Ransom County, North Dakota, 1910

== Geography ==
The Sheyenne River meanders through Ransom County. The county terrain consists of rolling hills, dotted with lakes and ponds in its western part. The area is largely devoted to agriculture. The terrain slopes to the east and south; its highest point is on the north boundary line near its northwestern corner, at 1,421 ft (433 m) ASL.

According to the United States Census Bureau, the county has a total area of 863.855 square miles (2,237.37 km^{2}), of which 862.472 square miles (2,233.79 km^{2}) is land and 1.383 square miles (3.58 km^{2}) (0.16%) is water. It is the 46th largest county in North Dakota by total area.

Soils of Ransom County

=== Major highways ===
- North Dakota Highway 27
- North Dakota Highway 32
- North Dakota Highway 46

=== Adjacent counties ===
- Cass County - northeast
- Richland County - east
- Sargent County - south
- Dickey County - southwest
- LaMoure County - west
- Barnes County - northwest

=== Protected areas ===
- Browns Ranch
- Fort Ransom State Historic Site
- Fort Ransom State Park
- Nature Conservancy's Sheyenne Delta
- North Country Trail
- Pigeon Point Reserve
- Sheyenne National Grassland (part)
- Sheyenne State Forest

=== Lakes ===
- Lone Tree Lake

== Demographics ==
Historical population
Census	Pop.	Note	%±
1880	537		—
1890	5,393		904.3%
1900	6,919		28.3%
1910	10,345		49.5%
1920	11,618		12.3%
1930	10,983		−5.5%
1940	10,061		−8.4%
1950	8,876		−11.8%
1960	8,078		−9.0%
1970	7,102		−12.1%
1980	6,698		−5.7%
1990	5,921		−11.6%
2000	5,890		−0.5%
2010	5,457		−7.4%
2020	5,703		4.5%
2025 (est.)	5,617	▼	−1.5%
U.S. Decennial Census

As of the fourth quarter of 2024, the median home value in Ransom County was $185,210.

=== American Community Survey ===
As of the 2023 American Community Survey, there are 2,305 estimated households in Ransom County with an average of 2.32 persons per household. The county has a median household income of $74,521. Approximately 9.3% of the county's population lives at or below the poverty line. Ransom County has an estimated 62.5% employment rate, with 21.0% of the population holding a bachelor's degree or higher and 90.6% holding a high school diploma.

The top five reported ancestries (people were allowed to report up to two ancestries, thus the figures will generally add to more than 100%) were English (94.1%), Spanish (1.1%), Indo-European (3.9%), Asian and Pacific Islander (0.8%), and Other (0.1%).

The median age in the county was 41.1 years.

Ransom County, North Dakota – racial and ethnic composition
Note: the US Census treats Hispanic/Latino as an ethnic category. This table excludes Latinos from the racial categories and assigns them to a separate category. Hispanics/Latinos may be of any race.

Race / ethnicity (NH = non-Hispanic)	Pop. 1980	Pop. 1990	Pop. 2000	Pop. 2010	Pop. 2020
White alone (NH)	6,647 (99.24%)	5,872 (99.17%)	5,749 (97.61%)	5,285 (96.85%)	5,363 (94.04%)
Black or African American alone (NH)	3 (0.04%)	4 (0.07%)	11 (0.19%)	19 (0.35%)	36 (0.63%)
Native American or Alaska Native alone (NH)	7 (0.10%)	13 (0.22%)	19 (0.32%)	21 (0.38%)	18 (0.32%)
Asian alone (NH)	14 (0.21%)	7 (0.12%)	14 (0.24%)	20 (0.37%)	24 (0.42%)
Pacific Islander alone (NH)	—	—	0 (0.00%)	0 (0.00%)	0 (0.00%)
Other race alone (NH)	13 (0.19%)	1 (0.02%)	4 (0.07%)	1 (0.02%)	10 (0.18%)
Mixed race or multiracial (NH)	—	—	45 (0.76%)	45 (0.82%)	123 (2.16%)
Hispanic or Latino (any race)	14 (0.21%)	24 (0.41%)	48 (0.81%)	66 (1.21%)	129 (2.26%)
Total	6,698 (100.00%)	5,921 (100.00%)	5,890 (100.00%)	5,457 (100.00%)	5,703 (100.00%)

=== 2024 estimate ===
As of the 2024 estimate, there were 5,590 people and 2,305 households residing in the county. There were 2,553 housing units at an average density of 2.96 per square mile (1.1/km^{2}). The racial makeup of the county was 94.8% White (92.2% NH White), 0.9% African American, 1.0% Native American, 1.2% Asian, 0.1% Pacific Islander, _% from some other races and 2.0% from two or more races. Hispanic or Latino people of any race were 2.8% of the population.

=== 2020 census ===
As of the 2020 census, the county had a population of 5,703. There were 2,246 households and 1,420 families residing in the county. Of the residents, 24.3% were under the age of 18 and 21.6% were 65 years of age or older; the median age was 42.4 years. For every 100 females there were 110.3 males, and for every 100 females age 18 and over there were 108.8 males.

The racial makeup of the county was 94.7% White, 0.7% Black or African American, 0.3% American Indian and Alaska Native, 0.4% Asian, 0.9% from some other race, and 3.0% from two or more races. Hispanic or Latino residents of any race comprised 2.3% of the population.

The population density was 6.61 inhabitants per square mile (2.6/km^{2}).

There were 2,246 households in the county, of which 28.3% had children under the age of 18 living with them and 20.7% had a female householder with no spouse or partner present. About 31.5% of all households were made up of individuals and 14.4% had someone living alone who was 65 years of age or older.

There were 2,536 housing units at an average density of 2.94 per square mile (1.1/km^{2}); 11.4% were vacant. Among occupied housing units, 72.5% were owner-occupied and 27.5% were renter-occupied. The homeowner vacancy rate was 1.0% and the rental vacancy rate was 12.8%.

=== 2010 census ===
As of the 2010 census, there were 5,457 people, 2,310 households, and 1,466 families residing in the county. The population density was 6.33 inhabitants per square mile (2.4/km^{2}). There were 2,656 housing units at an average density of 3.08 per square mile (1.2/km^{2}). The racial makeup of the county was 97.82% White, 0.35% African American, 0.42% Native American, 0.37% Asian, 0.05% Pacific Islander, 0.13% from some other races and 0.86% from two or more races. Hispanic or Latino people of any race were 1.21% of the population.

In terms of ancestry, 54.2% were German, 36.6% were Norwegian, 9.0% were Irish, 6.9% were Swedish, 5.1% were English, and 1.6% were American.

There were 2,310 households, 27.8% had children under the age of 18 living with them, 54.8% were married couples living together, 5.4% had a female householder with no husband present, 36.5% were non-families, and 32.9% of all households were made up of individuals. The average household size was 2.28 and the average family size was 2.89. The median age was 45.2 years.

The median income for a household in the county was $46,044 and the median income for a family was $59,973. Males had a median income of $42,380 versus $28,209 for females. The per capita income for the county was $21,995. About 7.5% of families and 9.4% of the population were below the poverty line, including 13.2% of those under age 18 and 11.6% of those age 65 or over.

== Communities ==
=== Cities ===
- Elliott
- Enderlin (partly in Cass County)
- Fort Ransom
- Lisbon (county seat)
- Sheldon

=== Census-designated places ===
- Englevale
- McLeod

=== Townships ===
- Aliceton
- Alleghany
- Bale
- Big Bend
- Casey
- Coburn
- Elliott
- Fort Ransom
- Greene
- Hanson
- Island Park
- Isley
- Liberty
- McLeod
- Moore
- Northland
- Owego
- Preston
- Rosemeade
- Sandoun
- Scoville
- Shenford
- Springer
- Sydna
- Tuller

== Politics ==
Ransom County is a swing county in presidential elections, having voted for both parties an equal number of times between 1976 and 2020. It voted for the Democrat in the 2000 and 2012 gubernatorial elections, and for the Republican in 2004, 2008, and 2016. It is also a bellwether county at the presidential level, having voted for the winner in every presidential election between the 1964 and 1984 and again from 1992 to 2016. The county broke its bellwether streak in 1988 and 2020, voting for the Democratic nominee Michael Dukakis in 1988 and Republican nominee Donald Trump in 2020, who both would lose the general election.

Ransom County is one of the most Democratic counties in North Dakota. In the 2018 election for U.S. Senate, it gave Heidi Heitkamp her 4th-highest total (60.6%), behind only Sioux, Rolette, and Benson counties.

United States presidential election results for Ransom County, North Dakota
Year	Republican		Democratic		Third party(ies)	
Year	No.	%	No.	%	No.	%
1900	924	62.77%	499	33.90%	49	3.33%
1904	1,257	79.66%	253	16.03%	68	4.31%
1908	1,308	67.53%	581	29.99%	48	2.48%
1912	495	31.21%	490	30.90%	601	37.89%
1916	1,093	47.81%	1,121	49.04%	72	3.15%
1920	3,010	77.30%	802	20.60%	82	2.11%
1924	1,862	45.59%	303	7.42%	1,919	46.99%
1928	2,613	63.04%	1,505	36.31%	27	0.65%
1932	1,445	31.67%	3,025	66.29%	93	2.04%
1936	1,303	30.32%	2,385	55.49%	610	14.19%
1940	2,579	56.20%	1,986	43.28%	24	0.52%
1944	2,044	55.06%	1,639	44.15%	29	0.78%
1948	1,772	50.85%	1,595	45.77%	118	3.39%
1952	3,051	70.19%	1,265	29.10%	31	0.71%
1956	2,361	56.56%	1,808	43.32%	5	0.12%
1960	2,324	56.26%	1,806	43.72%	1	0.02%
1964	1,647	44.31%	2,063	55.50%	7	0.19%
1968	1,943	57.43%	1,286	38.01%	154	4.55%
1972	2,056	59.85%	1,355	39.45%	24	0.70%
1976	1,696	49.07%	1,715	49.62%	45	1.30%
1980	1,883	59.93%	974	31.00%	285	9.07%
1984	1,706	57.38%	1,222	41.10%	45	1.51%
1988	1,362	47.66%	1,459	51.05%	37	1.29%
1992	1,102	37.96%	1,166	40.17%	635	21.87%
1996	920	37.78%	1,199	49.24%	316	12.98%
2000	1,488	54.73%	1,080	39.72%	151	5.55%
2004	1,352	51.96%	1,199	46.08%	51	1.96%
2008	998	41.02%	1,371	56.35%	64	2.63%
2012	1,009	41.61%	1,343	55.38%	73	3.01%
2016	1,210	51.29%	838	35.52%	311	13.18%
2020	1,418	57.78%	945	38.51%	91	3.71%
2024	1,661	62.70%	920	34.73%	68	2.57%

== Education ==
School districts include:

- Enderlin Area Public School District 24
- Fort Ransom Public School District 6
- Kindred Public School District 2
- LaMoure Public School District 8
- Litchville-Marion Public School District 46
- Lisbon Public School District 19
- Milnor Public School District 2
- North Sargent Public School District 3
- Oakes Public School District 41
- Wyndmere Public School District 42

In 1905 it had 22 school districts, with 16 not having a bond. Circa 1905 the county had 2,431 students in its three high schools, five grade schools, and 75 schoolhouses.

== See also ==
- National Register of Historic Places listings in Ransom County ND
