= Adrian Township, LaMoure County, North Dakota =

- Township
- Location within the state of North Dakota
- Coordinates: 46°35′41″N 98°35′21″W
- Country: United States
- State: North Dakota
- County: LaMoure

Area
  - Total: 36.1 sq mi (93 km^{2})
  - Land: 36.1 sq mi (93 km^{2})
  - Water: 0.0 sq mi (0 km^{2})
- Elevation: 1,486 ft (453 m)

Population (2020)
  - Total: 113
  - Density: 3/sq mi (1.2/km^{2})
- Time zone: UTC-6 (Central (CST))
  - Summer (DST): UTC-5 (CDT)
- Area code: 701
- FIPS code: 38-00660
- GNIS feature ID: 1036914

Adrian Township is a township in LaMoure County in the U.S. state of North Dakota. Its population at the 2020 U.S. census was 113. Its population at the 2010 U.S. census was 99, and in 2000 was 110.
