= Englevale, North Dakota =

- Census-designated place & Unincorporated community
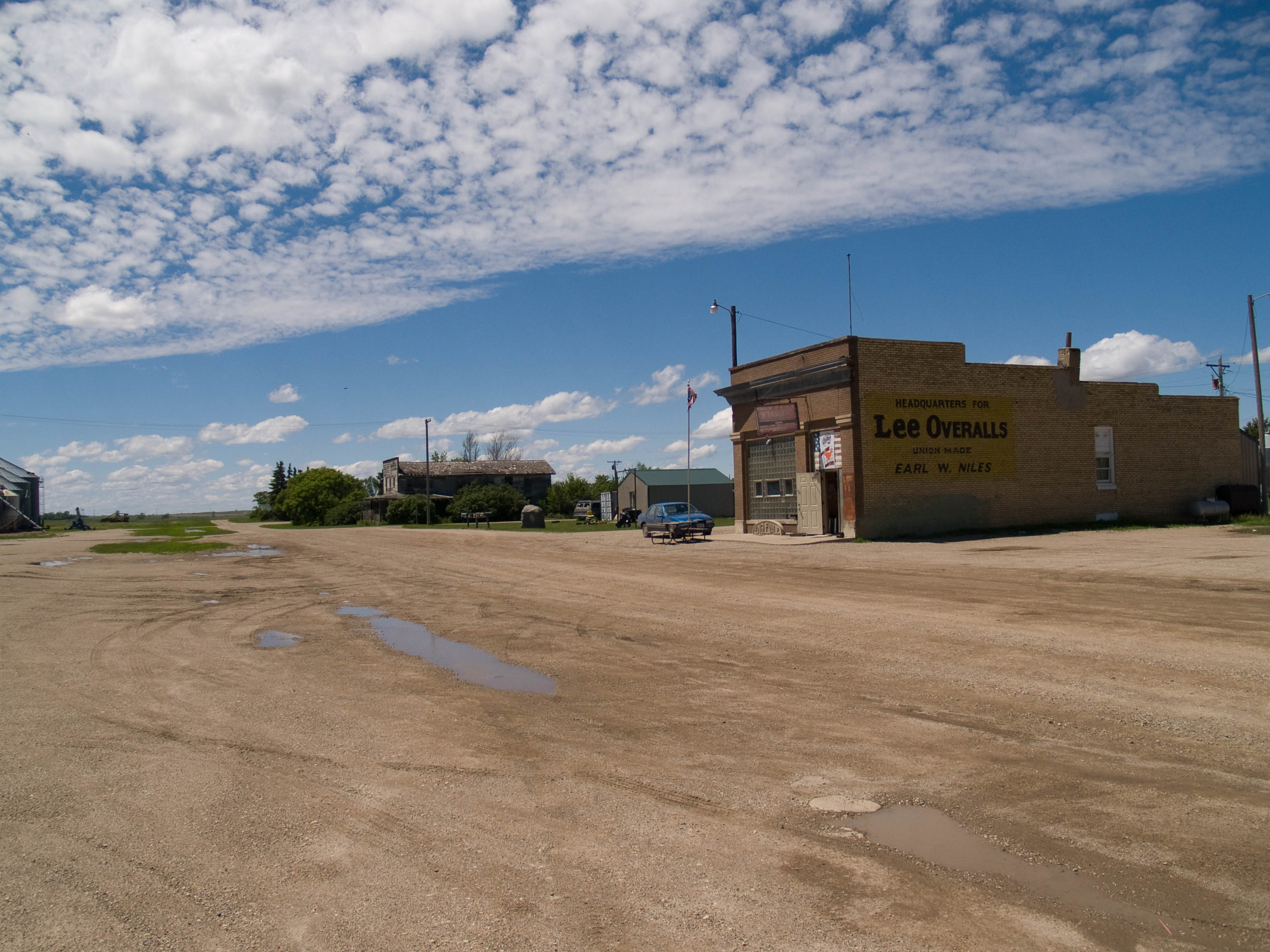
- Buildings in Englevale

- Location within North Dakota Location within the United States
- Coordinates: 46°23′28″N 97°54′14″W
- Country: United States
- State: North Dakota
- County: Ransom

Area
  - Total: 1.49 sq mi (3.85 km^{2})
  - Land: 1.49 sq mi (3.85 km^{2})
  - Water: 0 sq mi (0.00 km^{2})
- Elevation: 1,342 ft (409 m)

Population (2020)
  - Total: 36
  - Density: 24.2/sq mi (9.35/km^{2})
- Time zone: UTC-6 (Central (CST))
  - Summer (DST): UTC-5 (CDT)
- Area code: 701
- GNIS feature ID: 2584342

Englevale is a census-designated place and unincorporated community in Ransom County, North Dakota, United States. As of the 2020 census, Englevale had a population of 36.

== History ==
The community was initially named Marshall after landowner Marshall T. Davis; it was later renamed for Mathias L. Engel, a promoter for the community. The population was estimated at 200 in 1940.

== Demographics ==
Historical population
| Census | Pop. | Note | %± |
|---|---|---|---|
| 2020 | 36 | | — |
U.S. Decennial Census
