= Berlin, North Dakota =

Berlin
- City
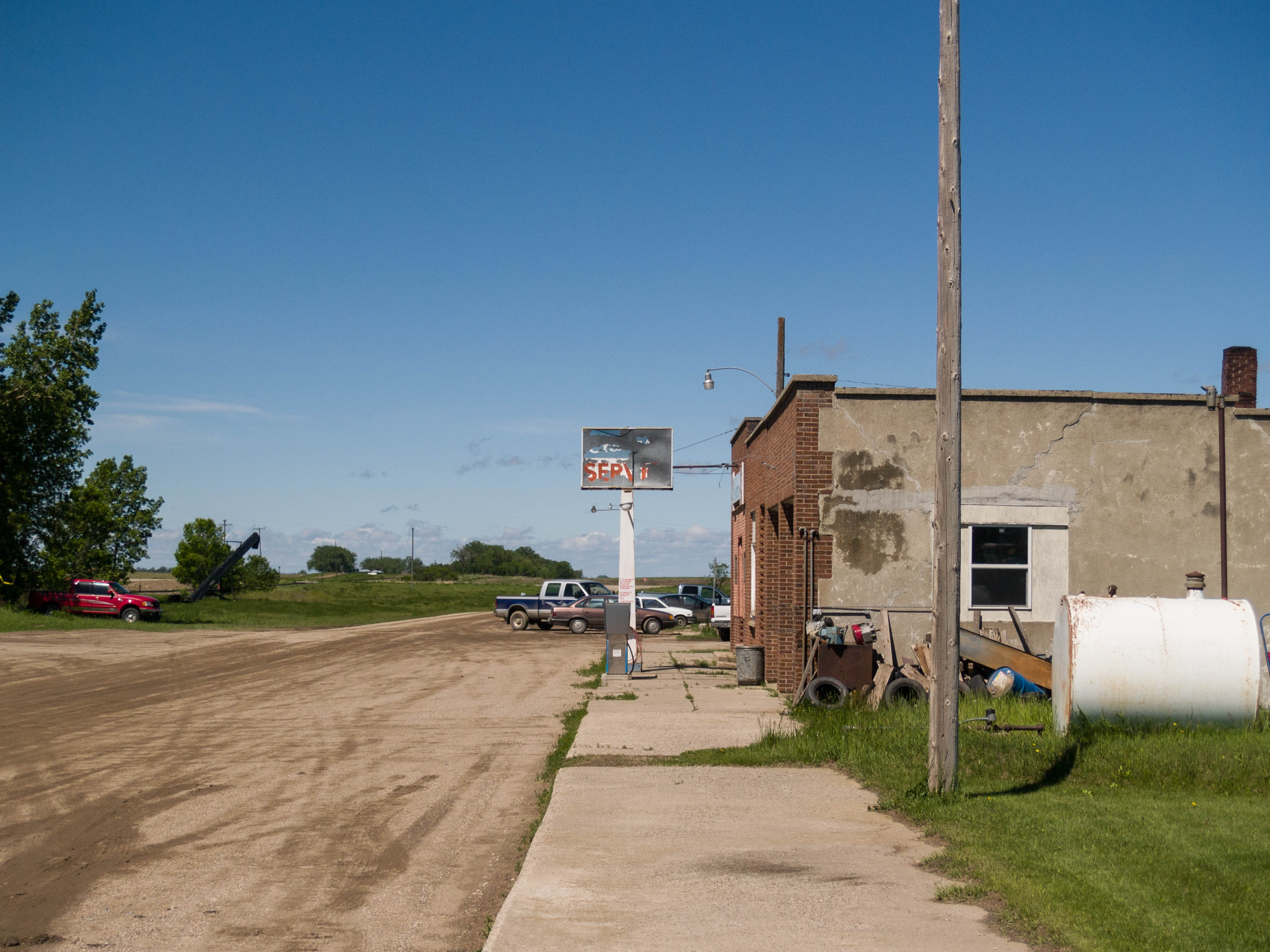
- Buildings in Berlin

- Coordinates: 46°22′42″N 98°29′16″W
- Country: United States
- State: North Dakota
- County: LaMoure
- Founded: 1887

Area
  - Total: 0.097 sq mi (0.25 km^{2})
  - Land: 0.097 sq mi (0.25 km^{2})
  - Water: 0 sq mi (0.00 km^{2})
- Elevation: 1,467 ft (447 m)

Population (2020)
  - Total: 31
  - Estimate (2022): 32
  - Density: 321.7/sq mi (124.22/km^{2})
- Time zone: UTC-6 (Central (CST))
  - Summer (DST): UTC-5 (CDT)
- ZIP code: 58415
- Area code: 701
- FIPS code: 38-06300
- GNIS feature ID: 1033627

Berlin is a city in LaMoure County, North Dakota, United States. The population was 31 at the 2020 census. Berlin was founded in 1887.

== Geography ==
Berlin is located at 46°22′42″N 98°29′16″W (46.378410, -98.487859).

According to the United States Census Bureau, the city has a total area of 0.10 square miles (0.26 km^{2}), all land.

== Demographics ==
Historical population
Census	Pop.	Note	%±
1910	137		—
1920	130		−5.1%
1930	135		3.8%
1940	132		−2.2%
1950	124		−6.1%
1960	78		−37.1%
1970	76		−2.6%
1980	57		−25.0%
1990	38		−33.3%
2000	35		−7.9%
2010	34		−2.9%
2020	31		−8.8%
2022 (est.)	32		3.2%
U.S. Decennial Census; 2020 Census

=== 2010 census ===
As of the census of 2010, there were 34 people, 12 households, and 9 families residing in the city. The population density was 340.0 inhabitants per square mile (131.3/km^{2}). There were 18 housing units at an average density of 180.0 per square mile (69.5/km^{2}). The racial makeup of the city was 88.2% White and 11.8% Asian.

There were 12 households, of which 33.3% had children under the age of 18 living with them, 75.0% were married couples living together, and 25.0% were non-families. 25.0% of all households were made up of individuals, and 16.7% had someone living alone who was 65 years of age or older. The average household size was 2.83 and the average family size was 3.44.

The median age in the city was 43.5 years. 35.3% of residents were under the age of 18; 2.9% were between the ages of 18 and 24; 17.6% were from 25 to 44; 17.6% were from 45 to 64; and 26.5% were 65 years of age or older. The gender makeup of the city was 52.9% male and 47.1% female.

=== 2000 census ===
As of the census of 2000, there were 35 people, 15 households, and 10 families residing in the city. The population density was 340.9 inhabitants per square mile (131.6/km^{2}). There were 20 housing units at an average density of 194.8 per square mile (75.2/km^{2}). The racial makeup of the city was 100.00% White.

There were 15 households, out of which 20.0% had children under the age of 18 living with them, 73.3% were married couples living together, and 26.7% were non-families. 26.7% of all households were made up of individuals, and none had someone living alone who was 65 years of age or older. The average household size was 2.33 and the average family size was 2.73.

In the city, the population was spread out, with 22.9% under the age of 18, 2.9% from 18 to 24, 20.0% from 25 to 44, 37.1% from 45 to 64, and 17.1% who were 65 years of age or older. The median age was 46 years. For every 100 females, there were 105.9 males. For every 100 females age 18 and over, there were 145.5 males.

The median income for a household in the city was $31,250, and the median income for a family was $46,875. Males had a median income of $26,250 versus $28,750 for females. The per capita income for the city was $18,795. There were 14.3% of families and 8.1% of the population living below the poverty line, including no under eighteens and none of those over 64.

== Education ==
The school district is LaMoure Public School District 8.

== Notable person ==
- Milton Young, U.S. senator from North Dakota
