= Alfred, North Dakota =

Unincorporated community in North Dakota, US

Coordinates: 46°36′11″N 98°59′57″W

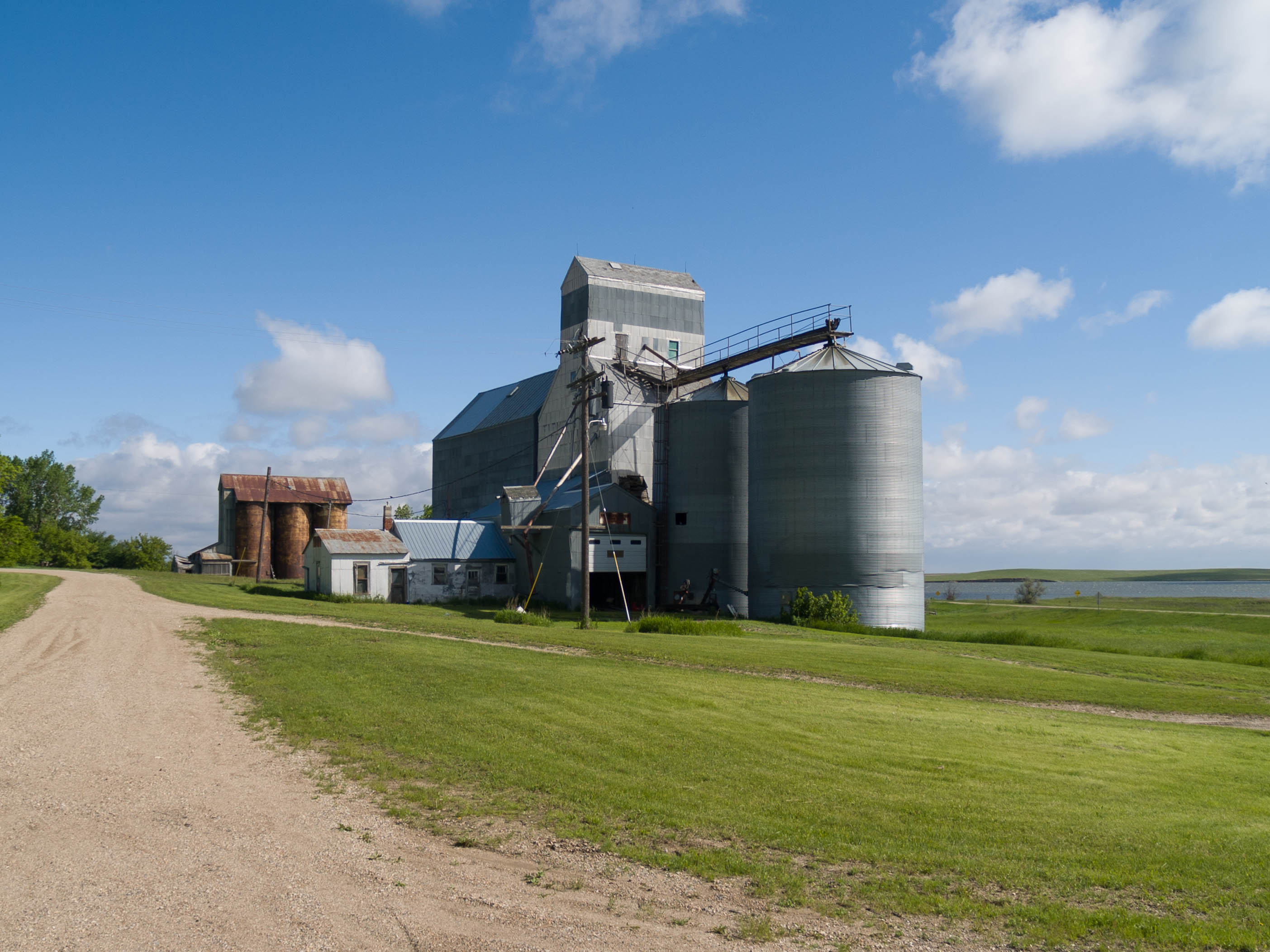
Alfred in 2008

Alfred is an unincorporated hamlet in LaMoure County, North Dakota, United States. It was one of five towns founded by Richard Sykes. Its population is estimated at ten and it consists of a few houses, a licensed boarding home, a grocery store and a Protestant church, as well as grain storage bins and a boat-dock at the small lake which borders the hamlet on the northeast. Alfred is surrounded by numerous grain farms. There are no local town services, and its post office has closed.

== History ==
The population was estimated at 500 in 1940.
