= LaMoure Public Schools =

School district in North Dakota, United States

LaMoure Public School District 8 or LaMoure Public School is a school district and associated school in LaMoure, North Dakota.

Most of the district is in LaMoure County, where it includes LaMoure, Berlin, and Verona. Portions of the district extend into Dickey County, and a small portion lies in Ransom County.

Circa 1952 the composition of the school district changed. Advocacy to create a new elementary school began by 1952, and a new one was scheduled to open in 1956. In 1955 its territory had 140 square miles (360 km^{2}) of area.

In 1968 the North Dakota Education Association (NDEA) investigated an argument between the board of trustees and the teachers over how much money the teachers should be getting.

In 1971, the NDEA criticized the board of education and the district administration in a letter of reprimand, which argued that teacher retention was too low and which stated that, in the words of the Associated Press, there was a "poor attitude" in the board of trustees.
