= USS La Moure County (LST-883) =

LST-542-class tank landing ship

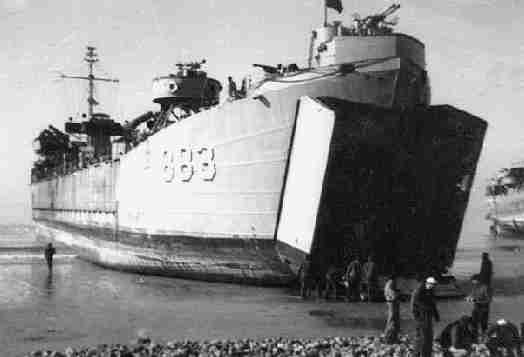
- LST-883 beached, at Taeyanpyong, Korea c. 1953.

History

United States
- Name: USS LST-883
- Builder: Missouri Valley Bridge & Iron Company, Evansville, Indiana
- Laid down: 16 November 1944
- Launched: 30 December 1944
- Commissioned: 23 January 1945
- Decommissioned: 20 April 1946
- Recommissioned: 26 August 1950
- Decommissioned: 7 December 1959
- Renamed: USS La Moure County (LST-883), 1 July 1955
- Stricken: 1 January 1960
- Honors and awards: 1 battle star (World War II); 7 battle stars (Korea)
- Fate: Sold for scrapping, 30 November 1960

General characteristics
- Class & type: LST-542-class tank landing ship
- Displacement: 1,625 long tons (1,651 t) light; 4,080 long tons (4,145 t) full
- Length: 328 ft (100 m)
- Beam: 50 ft (15 m)
- Draft: Unloaded : 2 ft 4 in (0.71 m) forward; 7 ft 6 in (2.29 m) aft; Loaded : 8 ft 2 in (2.49 m) forward; 14 ft 1 in (4.29 m) aft
- Propulsion: 2 × General Motors 12-567 diesel engines, two shafts, twin rudders
- Speed: 12 knots (22 km/h; 14 mph)
- Boats & landing craft carried: 2 × LCVPs
- Troops: Approximately 130 officers and enlisted men
- Complement: 8-10 officers, 89-100 enlisted men
- Armament: 8 × 40 mm guns; 12 × 20 mm guns

USS La Moure County (LST-883) was an LST-542-class tank landing ship built for the United States Navy during World War II. Named after LaMoure County, North Dakota, she was the first of two U.S. naval vessels to bear the name.

Originally laid down as LST-883 by the Missouri Valley Bridge & Iron Company of Evansville, Indiana on 16 November 1944; launched on 30 December 1944, sponsored by Mrs. L. D. McBride; and commissioned at New Orleans, Louisiana on 23 January 1945.

== Service history ==
=== World War II ===
After shakedown off the Florida coast, LST-883 departed New Orleans for the west coast on 28 February 1945 and arrived San Pedro, California on 26 March. Steaming via Seattle, Washington the landing ship reached the Hawaiian Islands on 1 May and trained there until sailing for the western Pacific on 24 May 1945.

She carried Seabees via the Marshalls and the Marianas to battle-torn Okinawa where she arrived on 26 June. After discharging men and equipment, she embarked veterans of the 6th Marine Division and sailed on 10 July. Steaming via Guam, she reached Pearl Harbor on 5 August 1945. During the rest of August she joined in amphibious training operations in the Hawaiian Islands.

=== Post-war activities ===
Following the surrender of Japan, she departed Pearl Harbor on 3 September 1945 with occupation forces for Japan. She disembarked troops at Sasebo, Kyūshū on 25 September before sailing for the Philippines 28 September. She arrived Lingayen Gulf on 5 October, and between 26 October and 4 November transported army engineers to Nagoya, Honshū. From Japan she arrived in Saipan on 14 November and operated in the Marianas during the remainder of 1945.

LST-883 steamed to San Pedro Bay, Leyte between 15 and 20 January 1946. During the next three months she made cargo and passenger runs to Mindoro, Mindanao, Luzon, and Samar. She was decommissioned at Samar on 20 April 1946, was placed in custody status, and was transferred to the United States Army on 26 August 1946 for use in Japan.

=== Korean War ===
Reacquired by the navy on 1 July 1950, LST-883 was recommissioned at Yokosuka, Japan on 26 August 1950. In response to President Truman's order to repel North Korean forces, she embarked Marines and army troops, loaded combat stores, and departed Kobe, Japan on 10 September 1950. She sailed for Inchon, South Korea as part of an amphibious attack force. Assigned to TG 90.3, LST-883 arrived off the Inchon seawalls on 15 September, at the start of the Battle of Inchon. Later that afternoon, she deposited troops on "Red Beach." As American naval and ground forces carried out the Inchon invasion, which spearheaded an Allied offensive northward, LST-883 discharged emergency supplies and dueled with enemy guns. She remained off Inchon until sailing for the eastern coast of Korea on 15 October 1950. For bravery and heroism off Red Beach, the LSTs of TE 90.32, including LST-883, received the Navy Unit Commendation.

Arriving Wonsan on 25 October, LST-883 made coastal troop and cargo runs from Wonsan to Hŭngnam until returning to Yokosuka on 22 November. After Chinese Communist armies moved southward into North Korea later that month, she departed Japan on 9 December 1950 for the amphibious evacuation of Hŭngnam. Between 15 and 27 December she completed two runs out of Hŭngnam to carry men and equipment to Pusan. She returned to Japan on New Year's Eve. She continued operations between Yokosuka and Pusan until 31 March 1951 when she sailed for the United States.

After arriving in the US on 29 April 1951, LST-883 underwent overhaul at Bremerton, Washington from 16 May to 22 July. During August and September she operated along the west coast, and on 2 October she departed San Francisco for the Far East, arriving in Yokosuka on 5 November. After operating along the Japanese coast, she arrived in Inchon on 28 December with a cargo of military vehicles. Between 28 December 1951 and 18 July 1952 she made numerous troop and cargo runs along the west coast of Korea, and between Korea and Japan. In addition, she joined in amphibious training exercises off Japan and Okinawa.

Departing Yokosuka on 25 July 1952, she arrived San Diego on 22 August, and during the next ten months operated off the California coast. Carrying men of the 3rd Marine Division, LST-883 again deployed to Korean waters on 15 June 1953. Steaming via Pearl Harbor and Yokosuka, she reached Pusan on 27 July 1953 as the armistice which halted hostilities in this conflict was signed at Panmunjom.

During the War, LST-883 was also "tasked with ferrying Chinese prisoners of war from South Korea back to North Korean ports."

=== Far East deployments ===
During August and September she carried troops and supplies from Korea to Japan and transported enemy prisoners from United Nations POW camps to Inchon. After returning to Yokosuka on 24 September 1953, she made coastal runs to Kobe and Kure and supported amphibious operations off Okinawa during the next five months. Between 26 February and 27 March 1954, she sailed from Japan to California via Pearl Harbor. She operated along the California coast out of San Diego during the remainder of 1954.

Departing San Diego on 17 February 1955, LST-883 arrived Japan on 17 March to begin a six-month deployment in the Far East. Renamed USS La Moure County (LST-883) on 1 July 1955, she operated with peacekeeping forces between Japan and Korea until sailing for the west coast on 20 September. Following her return to San Diego on 19 October, she resumed coastal operations and amphibious training duty off southern California. She served out of San Diego during the next two years and in 1956 completed two amphibious training cruises to Hawaii.

La Moure County departed San Diego on 9 January 1958 on her third deployment to the Far East since the Korean War. She arrived in Okinawa on 12 February for duty with the 7th Fleet. Over the next four months she steamed to the Philippines, Korea, and Japan. Departing the western Pacific on 25 June, she operated along the west coast until deploying to the Far East on 29 January 1959. Based at Yokosuka, she cruised the Japanese coast and participated in amphibious exercises off Okinawa and South Korea. She then sailed from Yokosuka for the United States on 19 May and arrived at Long Beach on 14 June.

=== Decommissioning and sale ===
La Moure County decommissioned there on 7 December 1959; her name was struck from the Naval Vessel Register on 1 January 1960; and she was sold for scrapping to Zidell Explorations, Inc. of Portland, Oregon, on 30 November 1960.

== Awards ==
La Moure County received one battle star for World War II service and seven battle stars for Korean War service.
