= Ludden, North Dakota =

Ludden
- City
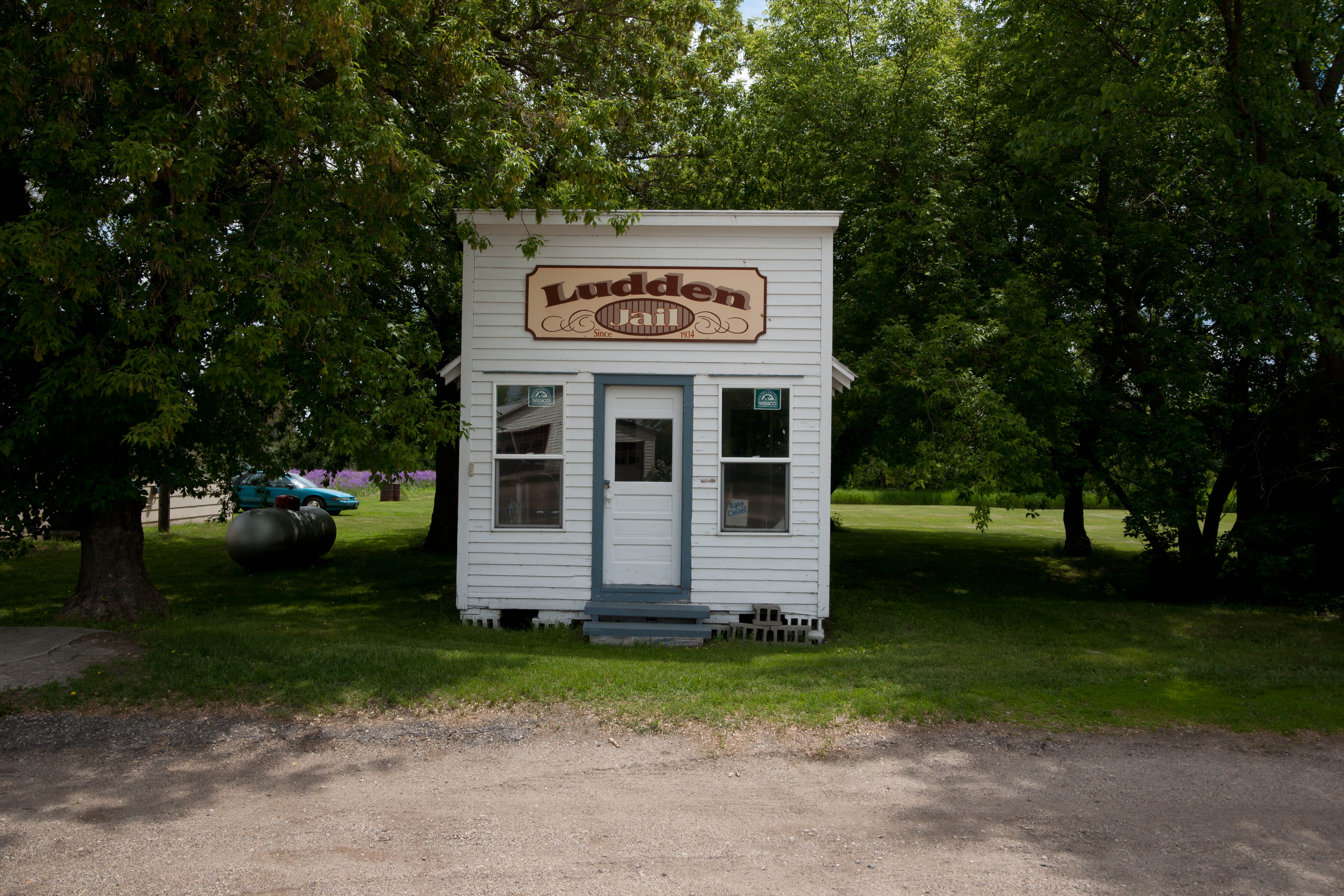
- Luden Jail - Ludden, North Dakota

- Location of Ludden, North Dakota
- Coordinates: 46°00′30″N 98°07′16″W
- Country: United States
- State: North Dakota
- County: Dickey
- Founded: 1886

Area
  - Total: 0.80 sq mi (2.08 km^{2})
  - Land: 0.80 sq mi (2.07 km^{2})
  - Water: 0.0039 sq mi (0.01 km^{2})
- Elevation: 1,302 ft (397 m)

Population (2020)
  - Total: 15
  - Estimate (2022): 17
  - Density: 18.8/sq mi (7.25/km^{2})
- Time zone: UTC-6 (Central (CST))
  - Summer (DST): UTC-5 (CDT)
- ZIP code: 58474
- Area code: 701
- FIPS code: 38-48460
- GNIS feature ID: 1036137

Ludden is a city in Dickey County, North Dakota, United States. The population was 15 at the 2020 census. Ludden was founded in 1886.

== History ==
Ludden was platted in 1886. It was named for David Ludden, a pioneer settler. Ludden was originally built up chiefly by Finns. A post office was established at Ludden in 1884, and remained in operation until it was discontinued in 1986.

== Geography ==
According to the United States Census Bureau, the city has a total area of 0.77 square miles (1.99 km^{2}), all land.

== Demographics ==
Historical population
Census	Pop.	Note	%±
1910	109		—
1920	132		21.1%
1930	164		24.2%
1940	150		−8.5%
1950	96		−36.0%
1960	59		−38.5%
1970	44		−25.4%
1980	47		6.8%
1990	41		−12.8%
2000	29		−29.3%
2010	23		−20.7%
2020	15		−34.8%
2022 (est.)	17		13.3%
U.S. Decennial Census; 2020 Census

=== 2010 census ===
As of the census of 2010, there were 23 people, 13 households, and 7 families residing in the city. The population density was 29.9 inhabitants per square mile (11.5/km^{2}). There were 19 housing units at an average density of 24.7 per square mile (9.5/km^{2}). The racial makeup of the city was 100.0% White.

There were 13 households, of which 15.4% had children under the age of 18 living with them, 46.2% were married couples living together, 7.7% had a male householder with no wife present, and 46.2% were non-families. 46.2% of all households were made up of individuals, and 15.4% had someone living alone who was 65 years of age or older. The average household size was 1.77 and the average family size was 2.43.

The median age in the city was 59.8 years. 13% of residents were under the age of 18; 0.0% were between the ages of 18 and 24; 17.3% were from 25 to 44; 34.7% were from 45 to 64; and 34.8% were 65 years of age or older. The gender makeup of the city was 60.9% male and 39.1% female.

=== 2000 census ===
As of the census of 2000, there were 29 people, 15 households, and 10 families residing in the city. The population density was 37.7 inhabitants per square mile (14.6/km^{2}). There were 18 housing units at an average density of 23.4 per square mile (9.0/km^{2}). The racial makeup of the city was 100.00% White.

There were 15 households, out of which 20.0% had children under the age of 18 living with them, 53.3% were married couples living together, and 26.7% were non-families. 26.7% of all households were made up of individuals, and 13.3% had someone living alone who was 65 years of age or older. The average household size was 1.93 and the average family size was 2.27.

In the city, the population was spread out, with 10.3% under the age of 18, 6.9% from 18 to 24, 17.2% from 25 to 44, 44.8% from 45 to 64, and 20.7% who were 65 years of age or older. The median age was 50 years. For every 100 females, there were 107.1 males. For every 100 females age 18 and over, there were 116.7 males.

The median income for a household in the city was $26,250, and the median income for a family was $36,250. Males had a median income of $40,625 versus $16,250 for females. The per capita income for the city was $20,770. There were no families and 7.4% of the population living below the poverty line, including no under eighteens and 50.0% of those over 64.
