= Maida, North Dakota =

- Unincorporated community
- Location within the state of North Dakota Maida (the United States)
- Coordinates: 48°59′55″N 98°21′53″W
- Country: United States
- State: North Dakota
- County: Cavalier
- Elevation: 1,562 ft (476 m)
- Time zone: UTC-6 (Central (CST))
  - Summer (DST): UTC-5 (CDT)
- ZIP codes: 58255
- Area code: 701
- GNIS feature ID: 1030066

Maida (or Seven Lakes) is an unincorporated community in northern Cavalier County, North Dakota, United States. It lies along North Dakota Highway 1, north of the city of Langdon, the county seat of Cavalier County. Its elevation is 1,562 feet (476 m). Maida serves as a port of entry between Canada and the United States.

Various possibilities have been suggested for the etymology of the name "Maida":

- A book read by Charles Howatt, the first postmaster
- Suggested by two Canadian bankers from a dog in a novel by Sir Walter Scott
- A clipping of "maiden" name for a haymeadow

Maida's post office was established in September 1884 and became a Rural Branch of Langdon in April 1967. The Maida post office has closed, but the community still has its own ZIP code of 58255.

A staple of the community, Jack's Bar, was known to seat up to 300 guests and served customers from both the United States and Canadian sides of the border. After 46 years in operation, Jack's bar closed in 2010 after to make room for a new border crossing facility. The new, high-tech border crossing opened in 2012, replacing the previous facility which had been open for more than fifty years.

== See also ==
- Maida–Windygates Border Crossing
