= Windygates, Manitoba =

Windygates
- Location of Windygates in Manitoba
- Coordinates: 49°0′2″N 98°21′53″W
- Country: Canada
- Province: Manitoba
- Region: Pembina Valley
- Census Division: No. 4

Government
  - Governing Body: Municipality of Pembina Council
  - MP: Grant Jackson
  - MLA: Doyle Piwniuk
- Time zone: UTC−6 (CST)
  - Summer (DST): UTC−5 (CDT)
- Area codes: 204, 431
- NTS Map: 062G01
- GNBC Code: GBEHT

Windygates is a locality in south central Manitoba, Canada. It is located approximately 29 kilometers (18 miles) southwest of Morden, Manitoba near the Canada–United States border in the Municipality of Pembina.

== See also ==
- List of regions of Manitoba
- List of rural municipalities in Manitoba
- Maida–Windygates Border Crossing
