= LaMoure County, North Dakota =

County in North Dakota, United States

- County
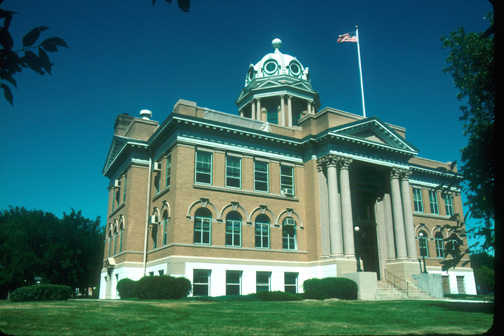
- The LaMoure County Courthouse in LaMoure

- Location within the U.S. state of North Dakota
- Coordinates: 46.464195°N 98.526057°W
- Country: United States
- State: North Dakota
- Founded: January 4, 1873 (created); October 27, 1881 (organized)
- Named for: Judson LaMoure
- Seat: LaMoure
- Largest city: LaMoure

Area
  - Total: 1,150.957 sq mi (2,980.96 km^{2})
  - Land: 1,146.005 sq mi (2,968.14 km^{2})
  - Water: 4.952 sq mi (12.83 km^{2}) 0.43%

Population (2020)
  - Total: 4,093
  - Estimate (2025): 4,135 ▲
  - Density: 3.6/sq mi (1.4/km^{2})
- Time zone: UTC−6 (Central)
  - Summer (DST): UTC−5 (CDT)
- Area code: 701
- Congressional district: At-large
- Website: lamourecountynd.com

LaMoure County is a county in the U.S. state of North Dakota. As of the 2020 census, the population was 4,093, and was estimated to be 4,135 in 2025. The county seat and the largest city is LaMoure.

== History ==
The Dakota Territory legislature created the county on January 4, 1873, with Grand Rapids as the county seat. However, the county organization was not completed at that time, nor was the county attached to another county for administrative and judicial purposes. It was named for Judson LaMoure, a member of the territorial/state legislature from 1872 to 1918.

The county organization was affected on October 27, 1881. Its boundaries were altered in February 1881 and in March 1883. It has retained its present boundary since that time. The present county seat, LaMoure, was founded in 1882, and the county seat was transferred to that community soon after.

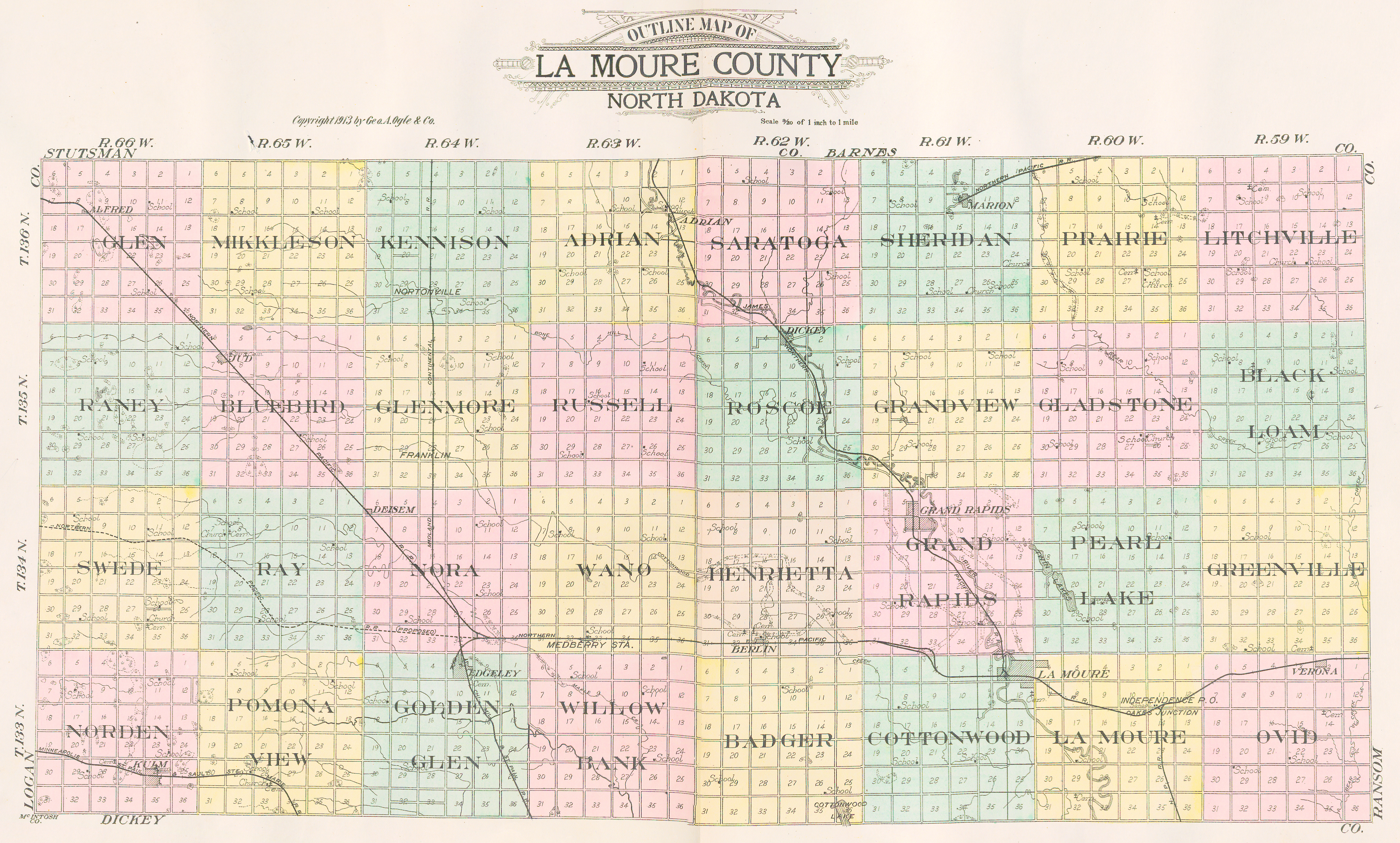
Outline map of LaMoure County, North Dakota, 1913

== Geography ==
The James River flows southeasterly through the central portion of LaMoure County, and a tributary of the South Branch Maple River flows southerly from the center of the county. The county terrain consists of rolling hills, mostly devoted to agriculture.

The terrain slopes to the south and east; its highest point is on its upper west boundary line at 2,047 ft (624 m) ASL.

According to the United States Census Bureau, the county has a total area of 1,150.957 square miles (2,980.96 km^{2}), of which 1,146.005 square miles (2,968.14 km^{2}) is land and 4.952 square miles (12.83 km^{2}) (0.43%) is water. It is the 29th largest county in North Dakota by total area.

LaMoure County hosts a Navy transmitter, the Naval Radio Transmitter Facility LaMoure.

=== Major highways ===
- U.S. Highway 281
- North Dakota Highway 1
- North Dakota Highway 13
- North Dakota Highway 46
- North Dakota Highway 56

=== Airports ===
- Kulm Municipal Airport (FAA LID: D03) - public use airport NE of Kulm.

=== Adjacent counties ===
- Stutsman County - north
- Barnes County - northeast
- Ransom County - east
- Dickey County - south
- McIntosh County - southwest
- Logan County - west

=== National protected area ===
- Bone Hill National Wildlife Refuge

=== Lakes ===
- Bone Hill Creek Lake
- Cottonwood Lake
- Lake Lamoure
- Pearl Lake
- Wild Rice Slough

== Demographics ==
Historical population
Census	Pop.	Note	%±
1880	20		—
1890	3,187		15,835.0%
1900	6,048		89.8%
1910	10,724		77.3%
1920	11,564		7.8%
1930	11,517		−0.4%
1940	10,298		−10.6%
1950	9,498		−7.8%
1960	8,705		−8.3%
1970	7,117		−18.2%
1980	6,473		−9.0%
1990	5,383		−16.8%
2000	4,701		−12.7%
2010	4,139		−12.0%
2020	4,093		−1.1%
2025 (est.)	4,135	▲	1.0%
U.S. Decennial Census:

As of the fourth quarter of 2024, the median home value in LaMoure County was $125,027.

As of the 2023 American Community Survey, there are 1,712 estimated households in LaMoure County with an average of 2.31 persons per household. The county has a median household income of $70,263. Approximately 9.4% of the county's population lives at or below the poverty line. LaMoure County has an estimated 63.6% employment rate, with 24.2% of the population holding a bachelor's degree or higher and 92.0% holding a high school diploma.

The top five reported ancestries (people were allowed to report up to two ancestries, thus the figures will generally add to more than 100%) were English (95.6%), Spanish (1.0%), Indo-European (3.2%), Asian and Pacific Islander (0.1%), and Other (0.1%).

The median age in the county was 46.7 years.

LaMoure County, North Dakota – racial and ethnic composition
Note: the US Census treats Hispanic/Latino as an ethnic category. This table excludes Latinos from the racial categories and assigns them to a separate category. Hispanics/Latinos may be of any race.

Race / ethnicity (NH = non-Hispanic)	Pop. 1980	Pop. 1990	Pop. 2000	Pop. 2010	Pop. 2020
White alone (NH)	6,440 (99.49%)	5,368 (99.72%)	4,648 (98.87%)	4,053 (97.92%)	3,897 (95.21%)
Black or African American alone (NH)	2 (0.03%)	0 (0.00%)	0 (0.00%)	5 (0.12%)	6 (0.15%)
Native American or Alaska Native alone (NH)	14 (0.22%)	5 (0.09%)	8 (0.17%)	16 (0.39%)	20 (0.49%)
Asian alone (NH)	4 (0.06%)	2 (0.04%)	6 (0.13%)	6 (0.14%)	7 (0.17%)
Pacific Islander alone (NH)	—	—	0 (0.00%)	0 (0.00%)	4 (0.10%)
Other race alone (NH)	7 (0.11%)	0 (0.00%)	0 (0.00%)	0 (0.00%)	10 (0.24%)
Mixed race or multiracial (NH)	—	—	13 (0.28%)	25 (0.60%)	61 (1.49%)
Hispanic or Latino (any race)	6 (0.09%)	8 (0.15%)	26 (0.55%)	34 (0.82%)	88 (2.15%)
Total	6,473 (100.00%)	5,383 (100.00%)	4,701 (100.00%)	4,139 (100.00%)	4,093 (100.00%)

=== 2024 estimate ===
As of the 2024 estimate, there were 4,051 people and 1,712 households residing in the county. There were 2,056 housing units at an average density of 1.79 per square mile (0.7/km^{2}). The racial makeup of the county was 97.3% White (94.7% NH White), 0.6% African American, 0.9% Native American, 0.1% Asian, 0.1% Pacific Islander, _% from some other races and 0.9% from two or more races. Hispanic or Latino people of any race were 2.7% of the population.

=== 2020 census ===
As of the 2020 census, the county had a population of 4,093, 1,720 households, and 1,105 families residing in the county. Of the residents, 22.6% were under the age of 18 and 25.8% were 65 years of age or older; the median age was 47.4 years. For every 100 females there were 103.7 males, and for every 100 females age 18 and over there were 103.2 males. The population density was 3.57 inhabitants per square mile (1.4/km^{2}). There were 2,064 housing units at an average density of 1.80 per square mile (0.7/km^{2}). The racial makeup of the county was 95.8% White, 0.3% Black or African American, 0.6% American Indian and Alaska Native, 0.2% Asian, 0.8% from some other race, and 2.1% from two or more races. Hispanic or Latino residents of any race comprised 2.2% of the population. There were 1,720 households in the county, of which 24.1% had children under the age of 18 living with them and 18.9% had a female householder with no spouse or partner present. About 31.4% of all households were made up of individuals and 16.9% had someone living alone who was 65 years of age or older. There were 2,064 housing units, of which 16.7% were vacant. Among occupied housing units, 81.7% were owner-occupied and 18.3% were renter-occupied. The homeowner vacancy rate was 2.3% and the rental vacancy rate was 11.7%.

=== 2010 census ===
As of the 2010 census, there were 4,139 people, 1,825 households, and 1,182 families residing in the county. The population density was 3.61 inhabitants per square mile (1.4/km^{2}). There were 2,238 housing units at an average density of 1.95 per square mile (0.8/km^{2}). The racial makeup of the county was 98.50% White, 0.14% African American, 0.39% Native American, 0.14% Asian, 0.00% Pacific Islander, 0.22% from some other races and 0.60% from two or more races. Hispanic or Latino people of any race were 0.82% of the population.

In terms of ancestry, 63.0% were German, 27.6% were Norwegian, 6.2% were Swedish, 6.1% were Russian, 6.0% were English, and 2.8% were American.

There were 1,825 households, 22.8% had children under the age of 18 living with them, 56.9% were married couples living together, 4.6% had a female householder with no husband present, 35.2% were non-families, and 32.7% of all households were made up of individuals. The average household size was 2.23 and the average family size was 2.82. The median age was 49.2 years.

The median income for a household in the county was $46,098 and the median income for a family was $60,932. Males had a median income of $41,250 versus $25,172 for females. The per capita income for the county was $27,056. About 6.8% of families and 9.1% of the population were below the poverty line, including 6.8% of those under age 18 and 16.9% of those age 65 or over.

== Communities ==
=== Cities ===
- Berlin
- Dickey
- Edgeley
- Jud
- Kulm
- LaMoure (county seat)
- Marion
- Verona

=== Unincorporated communities ===
- Alfred
- Diesem
- Medberry
- Nortonville

=== Townships ===
- Adrian
- Badger
- Black Loam
- Bluebird
- Dean
- Gladstone
- Glen
- Glenmore
- Golden Glen
- Grand Rapids
- Grandview
- Greenville
- Henrietta
- Kennison
- Mikkelson
- Nora
- Norden
- Ovid
- Pearl Lake
- Pomona View
- Prairie
- Raney
- Ray
- Roscoe
- Russell
- Ryan
- Saratoga
- Sheridan
- Swede
- Wano
- Willowbank

=== Ghost town ===
- Alfred

== U.S. Navy ships ==
The United States Navy commissioned two tank landing ships named for the county. The first, USS La Moure County (LST-883), was commissioned January 23, 1945, and served until December 7, 1959. The second, USS La Moure County (LST-1194), was commissioned December 1, 1971 and served until November 17, 2000.

== Politics ==
LaMoure County voters are traditionally Republican. In only one national election since 1936 has the county selected the Democratic Party candidate (as of 2024).

United States presidential election results for LaMoure County, North Dakota
Year	Republican		Democratic		Third party(ies)	
Year	No.	%	No.	%	No.	%
1900	597	58.41%	405	39.63%	20	1.96%
1904	860	77.13%	195	17.49%	60	5.38%
1908	1,104	64.75%	553	32.43%	48	2.82%
1912	436	28.63%	588	38.61%	499	32.76%
1916	1,045	47.59%	990	45.08%	161	7.33%
1920	2,991	77.59%	645	16.73%	219	5.68%
1924	1,647	43.23%	221	5.80%	1,942	50.97%
1928	2,245	55.00%	1,800	44.10%	37	0.91%
1932	1,134	24.74%	3,310	72.22%	139	3.03%
1936	1,614	33.13%	2,412	49.52%	845	17.35%
1940	2,943	63.70%	1,637	35.43%	40	0.87%
1944	2,298	61.25%	1,422	37.90%	32	0.85%
1948	1,999	53.91%	1,481	39.94%	228	6.15%
1952	3,202	73.12%	1,145	26.15%	32	0.73%
1956	2,433	58.85%	1,694	40.98%	7	0.17%
1960	2,511	61.39%	1,575	38.51%	4	0.10%
1964	1,604	42.72%	2,145	57.12%	6	0.16%
1968	2,008	57.90%	1,269	36.59%	191	5.51%
1972	2,110	59.62%	1,399	39.53%	30	0.85%
1976	1,735	49.04%	1,718	48.56%	85	2.40%
1980	2,136	64.88%	850	25.82%	306	9.30%
1984	1,978	63.64%	1,086	34.94%	44	1.42%
1988	1,642	56.60%	1,223	42.16%	36	1.24%
1992	1,270	45.96%	797	28.85%	696	25.19%
1996	1,220	51.15%	880	36.90%	285	11.95%
2000	1,590	64.42%	689	27.92%	189	7.66%
2004	1,592	68.18%	712	30.49%	31	1.33%
2008	1,310	58.46%	868	38.73%	63	2.81%
2012	1,377	62.76%	740	33.73%	77	3.51%
2016	1,481	68.85%	502	23.34%	168	7.81%
2020	1,645	74.13%	527	23.75%	47	2.12%
2024	1,614	76.02%	453	21.34%	56	2.64%

== Education ==
School districts include:

- Fort Ransom Public School District 6
- Gackle-Streeter Public School District 56
- Litchville-Marion Public School District 46
- Edgeley Public School District 3
- Kulm Public School District 7
- LaMoure Public School District 8
- Montpelier Public School District 14
- Oakes Public School District 41

== See also ==
- National Register of Historic Places listings in LaMoure County, North Dakota
