= Verona, North Dakota =

- City
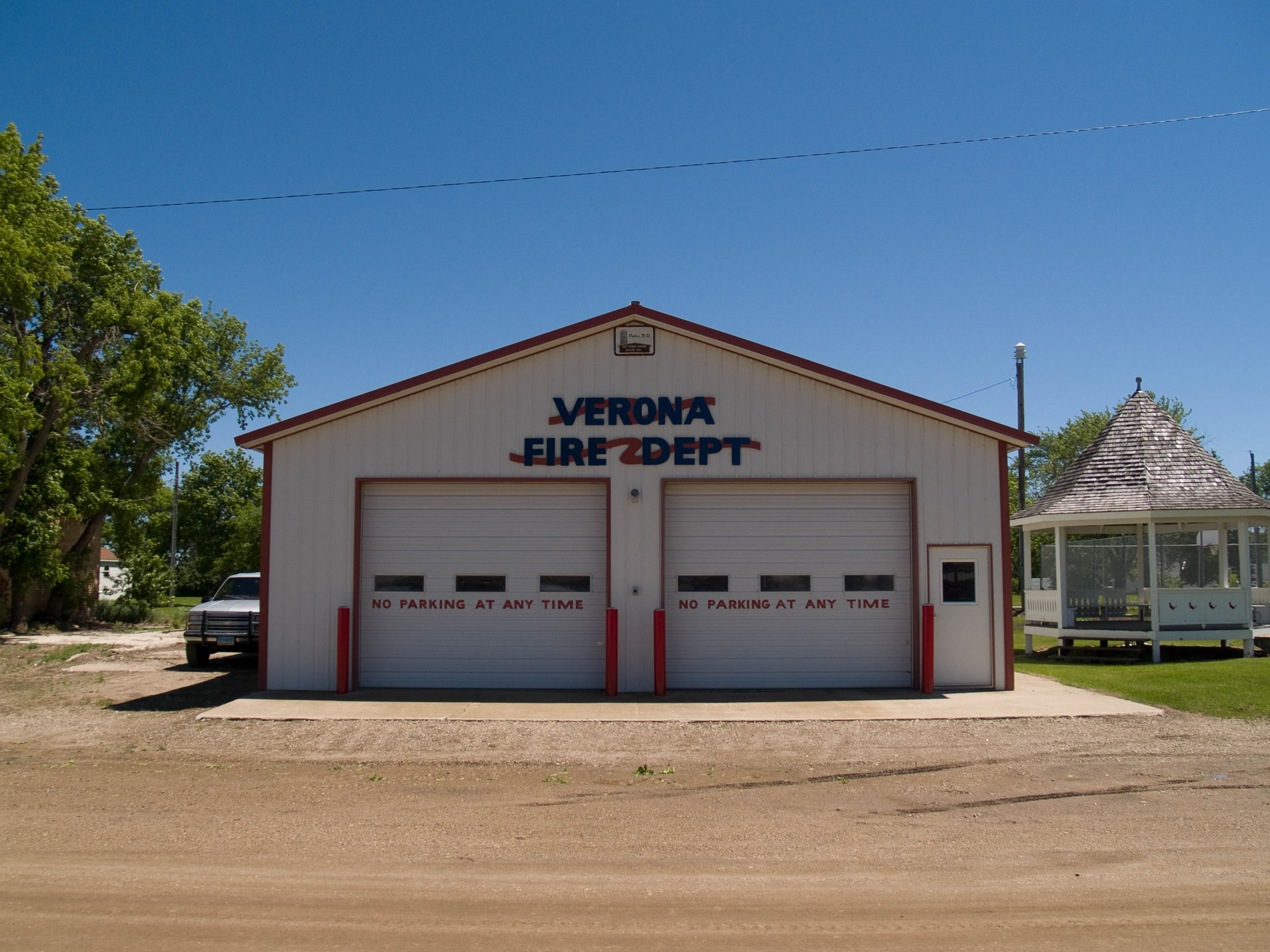
- Fire department in Verona

- Location of Verona, North Dakota
- Coordinates: 46°21′55″N 98°4′17″W
- Country: United States
- State: North Dakota
- County: LaMoure
- Founded: 1886

Area
  - Total: 0.58 sq mi (1.49 km^{2})
  - Land: 0.58 sq mi (1.49 km^{2})
  - Water: 0 sq mi (0.00 km^{2})
- Elevation: 1,388 ft (423 m)

Population (2020)
  - Total: 59
  - Estimate (2022): 60
  - Density: 103/sq mi (39.6/km^{2})
- Time zone: UTC-6 (Central (CST))
  - Summer (DST): UTC-5 (CDT)
- ZIP code: 58490
- Area code: 701
- FIPS code: 38-81900
- GNIS feature ID: 1033683

Verona is a city in LaMoure County, North Dakota, United States. The population was 59 at the 2020 census. Verona was founded in 1886.

== Geography ==
Verona is located at 46°21′55″N 98°4′17″W (46.365230, -98.071423).

According to the United States Census Bureau, the city has a total area of 0.25 square miles (0.65 km^{2}), all land.

== Demographics ==
Historical population
Census	Pop.	Note	%±
1910	235		—
1920	258		9.8%
1930	222		−14.0%
1940	201		−9.5%
1950	189		−6.0%
1960	162		−14.3%
1970	140		−13.6%
1980	126		−10.0%
1990	103		−18.3%
2000	108		4.9%
2010	85		−21.3%
2020	59		−30.6%
2022 (est.)	60		1.7%
U.S. Decennial Census; 2020 Census

=== 2010 census ===
As of the census of 2010, there were 85 people, 38 households, and 23 families residing in the city. The population density was 340.0 inhabitants per square mile (131.3/km^{2}). There were 47 housing units at an average density of 188.0 per square mile (72.6/km^{2}). The racial makeup of the city was 97.6% White, 1.2% Native American, and 1.2% from two or more races.

There were 38 households, of which 23.7% had children under the age of 18 living with them, 50.0% were married couples living together, 5.3% had a female householder with no husband present, 5.3% had a male householder with no wife present, and 39.5% were non-families. 31.6% of all households were made up of individuals, and 13.1% had someone living alone who was 65 years of age or older. The average household size was 2.24 and the average family size was 2.91.

The median age in the city was 45.5 years. 20% of residents were under the age of 18; 7.1% were between the ages of 18 and 24; 22.4% were from 25 to 44; 28.2% were from 45 to 64; and 22.4% were 65 years of age or older. The gender makeup of the city was 52.9% male and 47.1% female.

=== 2000 census ===
As of the census of 2000, there were 108 people, 44 households, and 30 families residing in the city. The population density was 417.6 inhabitants per square mile (161.2/km^{2}). There were 53 housing units at an average density of 205.0 per square mile (79.2/km^{2}). The racial makeup of the city was 99.07% White and 0.93% Native American.

There were 44 households, out of which 34.1% had children under the age of 18 living with them, 54.5% were married couples living together, 6.8% had a female householder with no husband present, and 31.8% were non-families. 25.0% of all households were made up of individuals, and 13.6% had someone living alone who was 65 years of age or older. The average household size was 2.45 and the average family size was 2.97.

In the city, the population was spread out, with 25.9% under the age of 18, 2.8% from 18 to 24, 38.0% from 25 to 44, 20.4% from 45 to 64, and 13.0% who were 65 years of age or older. The median age was 37 years. For every 100 females, there were 86.2 males. For every 100 females age 18 and over, there were 95.1 males.

The median income for a household in the city was $36,875, and the median income for a family was $39,375. Males had a median income of $31,250 versus $22,250 for females. The per capita income for the city was $14,327. There were 10.8% of families and 11.2% of the population living below the poverty line, including 14.6% of under eighteens and none of those over 64.

== Education ==
The school district is LaMoure Public School District 8.

== Notable person ==
- Frank J. Magill, United States Federal Court judge

== Climate ==
This climatic region is typified by large seasonal temperature differences, with warm to hot (and often humid) summers and cold (sometimes severely cold) winters. According to the Köppen Climate Classification system, Verona has a humid continental climate, abbreviated "Dfb" on climate maps.
