= Dazey, North Dakota =

- City
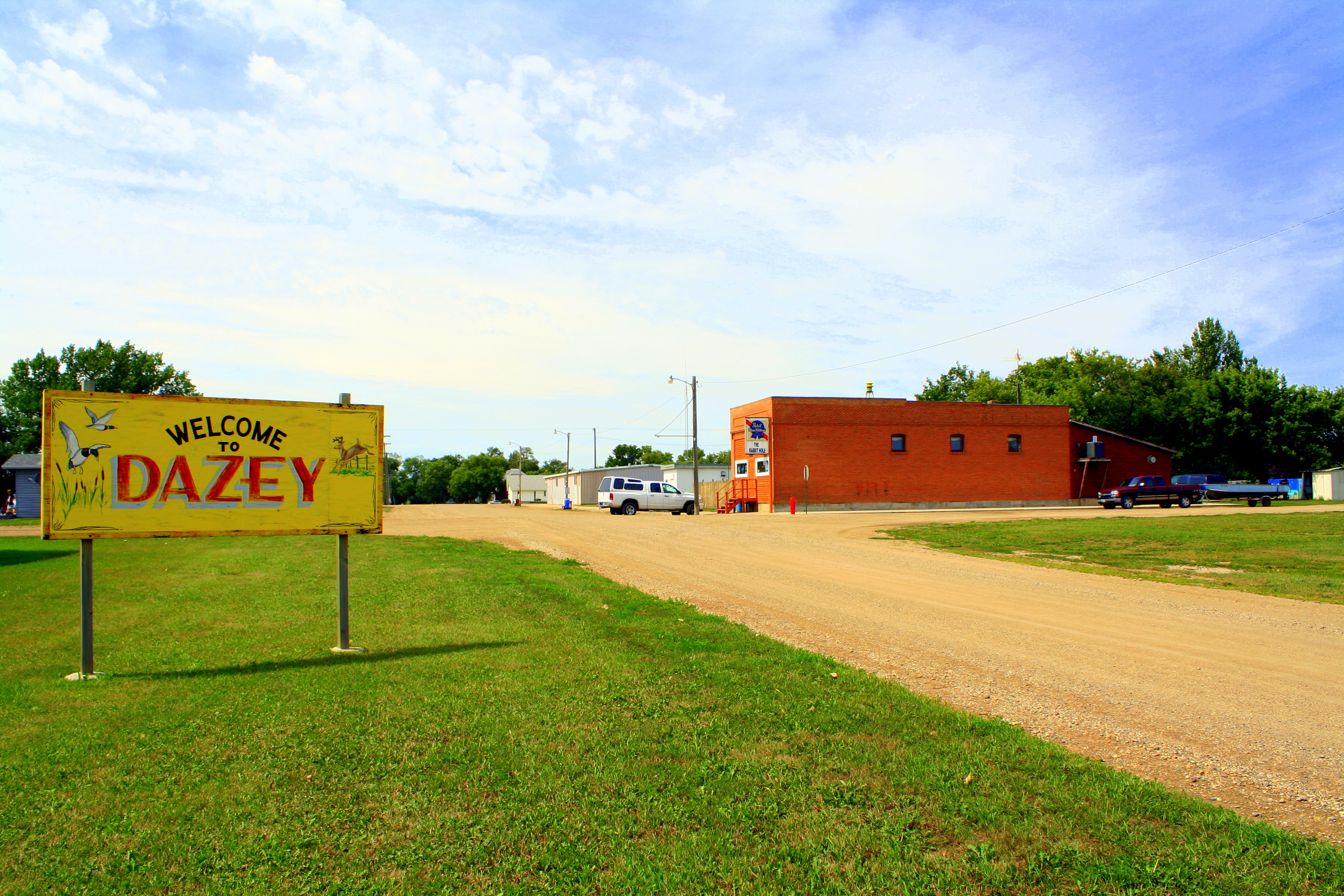
- Welcome sign in Dazey

- Location of Dazey, North Dakota
- Coordinates: 47°11′21″N 98°12′8″W
- Country: United States
- State: North Dakota
- County: Barnes
- Founded: 1883
- Incorporated as a village: 1904
- Incorporated as a city: 1967

Government
  - Mayor: Justin Sherlock

Area
  - Total: 0.38 sq mi (0.98 km^{2})
  - Land: 0.38 sq mi (0.98 km^{2})
  - Water: 0 sq mi (0.00 km^{2})
- Elevation: 1,434 ft (437 m)

Population (2020)
  - Total: 78
  - Estimate (2022): 76
  - Density: 205.7/sq mi (79.43/km^{2})
- Time zone: UTC-6 (Central (CST))
  - Summer (DST): UTC-5 (CDT)
- ZIP code: 58429
- Area code: 701
- FIPS code: 38-18340
- GNIS feature ID: 1028623

Dazey is a city in Barnes County, North Dakota, United States. The population was 78 at the 2020 census. Dazey was founded in 1883 after a local farmer, Charles Dazey, donated land to start a townsite.

== Geography ==
According to the United States Census Bureau, the city has a total area of 0.38 square miles (0.98 km^{2}), all land.

== History ==
Dazey was founded in 1883 and named for Charles Turner Dazey, who moved there from Illinois to run a bonanza farm in the early 1880s. Mr. Dazey donated the land to start the townsite. Mr. Dazey later moved back to Illinois where he became a successful playwright. It was incorporated as a village in 1904, and reached a peak population of 293 in 1920. It became a city in 1967, after the North Dakota Legislature enacted legislation that eliminated all existing incorporation titles for towns and villages in the state.

== Demographics ==
Historical population
Census	Pop.	Note	%±
1910	265		—
1920	293		10.6%
1930	251		−14.3%
1940	215		−14.3%
1950	196		−8.8%
1960	226		15.3%
1970	128		−43.4%
1980	143		11.7%
1990	129		−9.8%
2000	91		−29.5%
2010	104		14.3%
2020	78		−25.0%
2022 (est.)	76		−2.6%
U.S. Decennial Census; 2020 Census

=== 2010 census ===
As of the census of 2010, there were 104 people, 46 households, and 25 families living in the city. The population density was 273.7 inhabitants per square mile (105.7/km^{2}). There were 56 housing units at an average density of 147.4 per square mile (56.9/km^{2}). The racial makeup of the city was 98.1% White and 1.9% from two or more races. Hispanic or Latino of any race were 1.9% of the population.

There were 46 households, of which 30.4% had children under the age of 18 living with them, 37.0% were married couples living together, 8.7% had a female householder with no husband present, 8.7% had a male householder with no wife present, and 45.7% were non-families. 37.0% of all households were made up of individuals, and 6.5% had someone living alone who was 65 years of age or older. The average household size was 2.26 and the average family size was 3.04.

The median age in the city was 38 years. 26.9% of residents were under the age of 18; 2% were between the ages of 18 and 24; 30.7% were from 25 to 44; 30.8% were from 45 to 64; and 9.6% were 65 years of age or older. The gender makeup of the city was 58.7% male and 41.3% female.

=== 2000 census ===
As of the census of 2000, there were 91 people, 39 households, and 23 families living in the city. The population density was 238.5 inhabitants per square mile (92.1/km^{2}). There were 47 housing units at an average density of 123.2 per square mile (47.6/km^{2}). The racial makeup of the city was 100.00% White.

There were 39 households, out of which 25.6% had children under the age of 18 living with them, 43.6% were married couples living together, 7.7% had a female householder with no husband present, and 38.5% were non-families. 30.8% of all households were made up of individuals, and 17.9% had someone living alone who was 65 years of age or older. The average household size was 2.33 and the average family size was 2.83.

In the city, the population was spread out, with 25.3% under the age of 18, 2.2% from 18 to 24, 28.6% from 25 to 44, 20.9% from 45 to 64, and 23.1% who were 65 years of age or older. The median age was 42 years. For every 100 females, there were 97.8 males. For every 100 females age 18 and over, there were 106.1 males.

The median income for a household in the city was $22,813, and the median income for a family was $30,000. Males had a median income of $21,875 versus $40,000 for females. The per capita income for the city was $15,056. There were 12.5% of families and 12.5% of the population living below the poverty line, including 14.3% of under eighteens and none of those over 64.
