= Pillsbury, North Dakota =

- City
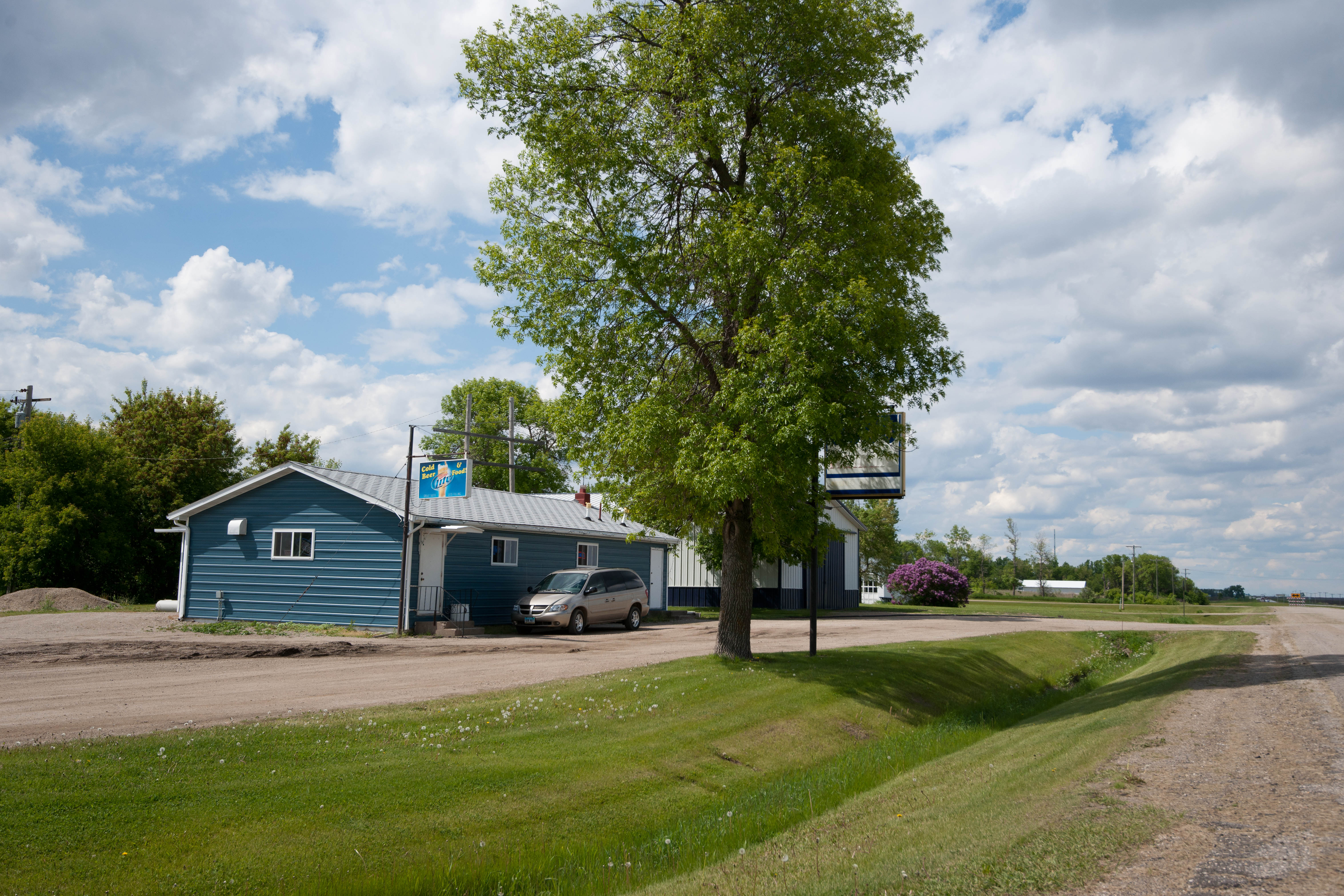
- Bar in Pillsbury

- Location of Pillsbury, North Dakota
- Coordinates: 47.207123°N 97.795691°W
- Country: United States
- State: North Dakota
- County: Barnes
- Founded: 1911

Government
  - Mayor: Darrel Brudevold (as of 2008)

Area
  - Total: 0.256 sq mi (0.662 km^{2})
  - Land: 0.256 sq mi (0.662 km^{2})
  - Water: 0 sq mi (0.0 km^{2})
- Elevation: 1,280 ft (390 m)

Population (2020)
  - Total: 12
  - Estimate (2024): 12
  - Density: 47.0/sq mi (18.13/km^{2})
- Demonym: Doughboys
- Time zone: UTC–6 (Central (CST))
  - Summer (DST): UTC–5 (CDT)
- ZIP Code: 58065
- Area code: 701
- FIPS code: 38-62540
- GNIS feature ID: 1030713

Pillsbury is a city in Barnes County, North Dakota, United States. The population was 12 at the 2020 census, and was estimated at 12 in 2024.

== History ==
Pillsbury was founded in 1911.

== Geography ==
According to the United States Census Bureau, the city has a total area of 0.255 square miles (0.66 km^{2}), all land.

== Demographics ==
Historical population
Census	Pop.	Note	%±
1920	142		—
1930	260		83.1%
1940	161		−38.1%
1950	119		−26.1%
1960	76		−36.1%
1970	50		−34.2%
1980	46		−8.0%
1990	31		−32.6%
2000	24		−22.6%
2010	12		−50.0%
2020	12		0.0%
2024 (est.)	12		0.0%
U.S. Decennial Census; 2020 Census

=== 2010 census ===
As of the 2010 census, there were 12 people, 8 households, and 4 families living in the city. The population density was 46.2 inhabitants per square mile (17.8/km^{2}). There were 12 housing units at an average density of 46.2 per square mile (17.8/km^{2}). The racial makeup of the city was 100.0% White.

There were 8 households, of which 50.0% were married couples living together and 50.0% were non-families. 50.0% of all households were made up of individuals, and 12.5% had someone living alone who was 65 years of age or older. The average household size was 1.50 and the average family size was 2.00.

The median age in the city was 64.5 years. 0.0% of residents were under the age of 18; 0.0% were between the ages of 18 and 24; 8.3% were from 25 to 44; 41.7% were from 45 to 64; and 50% were 65 years of age or older. The gender makeup of the city was 58.3% male and 41.7% female.

=== 2000 census ===
As of the 2000 census, there were 24 people, 11 households, and 6 families living in the city. The population density was 96.1 inhabitants per square mile (37.1/km^{2}). There were 11 housing units at an average density of 44.0 per square mile (17.0/km^{2}). The racial makeup of the city was 87.50% White and 12.50% Native American.

There were 11 households, out of which 27.3% had children under the age of 18 living with them, 63.6% were married couples living together, and 36.4% were non-families. 36.4% of all households were made up of individuals, and 18.2% had someone living alone who was 65 years of age or older. The average household size was 2.18 and the average family size was 2.86.

In the city, the population was spread out, with 20.8% under the age of 18, 8.3% from 18 to 24, 25.0% from 25 to 44, 37.5% from 45 to 64, and 8.3% who were 65 years of age or older. The median age was 43 years. For every 100 females, there were 166.7 males. For every 100 females age 18 and over, there were 171.4 males.

The median income for a household in the city was $24,583, and the median income for a family was $30,000. Males had a median income of $43,750 versus $12,500 for females. The per capita income for the city was $10,137. There were no families and 11.1% of the population living below the poverty line, including no under eighteens and 100% of those over 64.

== 2008 city election ==
Pillsbury made international headlines in 2008 when no residents of the city showed up to vote in the city's primary election on June 10. While names were on the ballot for each available position, nobody was being challenged. According to the Barnes County Auditor, those in office are allowed to appoint people, including themselves, to the open positions until the next election.

== Education ==
Hope-Page Public Schools serves the city.
