= Lisbon, North Dakota =

- City
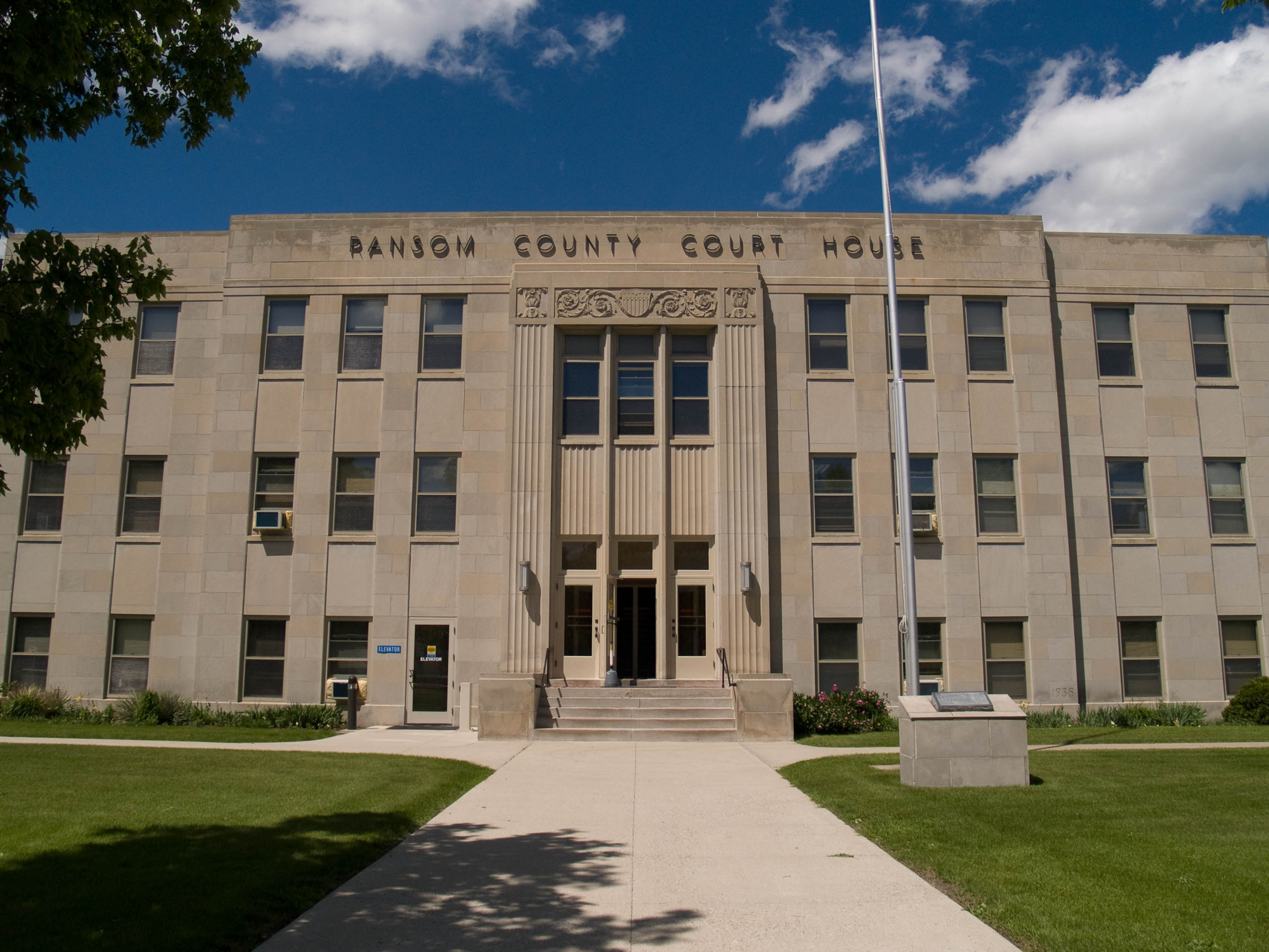
- Ransom County Courthouse in Lisbon

- Icon
- Motto: "A Place to Call Home!"
- Location of Lisbon, North Dakota
- Coordinates: 46°26′19″N 97°41′03″W
- Country: United States
- State: North Dakota
- County: Ransom
- Founded: 1880

Government
  - Mayor: Tim Meyer

Area
  - Total: 2.29 sq mi (5.94 km^{2})
  - Land: 2.29 sq mi (5.94 km^{2})
  - Water: 0 sq mi (0.00 km^{2})
- Elevation: 1,093 ft (333 m)

Population (2020)
  - Total: 2,204
  - Estimate (2024): 2,175
  - Density: 961.1/sq mi (371.08/km^{2})
- Time zone: UTC-6 (Central (CST))
  - Summer (DST): UTC-5 (CDT)
- ZIP code: 58054
- Area code: 701
- FIPS code: 38-47100
- GNIS feature ID: 1036133
- Highways: ND 27, ND 32
- Website: cityoflisbon.net

Lisbon is a city in and the county seat of Ransom County, North Dakota, United States. The population was 2,204 at the 2020 census.

== History ==
Lisbon was founded in 1880 by Joseph L. Colton, who named the new city after Lisbon, New York, his wife's hometown, not after Portugal's capital. Within four years, the town had a newspaper, the Star.

The campus of the North Dakota Veterans Home, established in 1891, provides retirement living for military veterans. Construction is underway for a large new facility adjacent to the current one.

Downtown Lisbon is home to the Scenic movie theater, which was established in 1911. The Scenic is the oldest, continuously running theater in the United States. During the COVID-19 pandemic in 2020, the theater remained open by providing outdoor showings.

== Geography and climate ==
According to the United States Census Bureau, the city has a total area of 2.25 square miles (5.83 km^{2}), all land.

Lisbon is at the intersection of State Highways 27 (5th Avenue) and 32 (Main Street).

Climate data for Lisbon, North Dakota (1991–2020 normals, extremes 1903–present)
Month	Jan	Feb	Mar	Apr	May	Jun	Jul	Aug	Sep	Oct	Nov	Dec	Year
Record high °F (°C)	60 (16)	68 (20)	83 (28)	99 (37)	107 (42)	105 (41)	113 (45)	110 (43)	104 (40)	94 (34)	76 (24)	67 (19)	113 (45)
Mean maximum °F (°C)	41.6 (5.3)	44.6 (7.0)	60.1 (15.6)	78.1 (25.6)	88.0 (31.1)	91.7 (33.2)	94.1 (34.5)	93.3 (34.1)	91.0 (32.8)	80.8 (27.1)	61.1 (16.2)	44.6 (7.0)	96.6 (35.9)
Mean daily maximum °F (°C)	18.5 (−7.5)	23.7 (−4.6)	37.1 (2.8)	53.5 (11.9)	67.4 (19.7)	77.1 (25.1)	82.0 (27.8)	80.6 (27.0)	72.1 (22.3)	56.1 (13.4)	38.7 (3.7)	24.6 (−4.1)	52.6 (11.5)
Daily mean °F (°C)	9.1 (−12.7)	13.5 (−10.3)	26.6 (−3.0)	41.3 (5.2)	55.0 (12.8)	65.5 (18.6)	70.2 (21.2)	68.0 (20.0)	58.9 (14.9)	44.1 (6.7)	28.9 (−1.7)	15.9 (−8.9)	41.4 (5.2)
Mean daily minimum °F (°C)	−0.3 (−17.9)	3.4 (−15.9)	16.2 (−8.8)	29.1 (−1.6)	42.5 (5.8)	53.8 (12.1)	58.4 (14.7)	55.4 (13.0)	45.7 (7.6)	32.2 (0.1)	19.1 (−7.2)	7.2 (−13.8)	30.2 (−1.0)
Mean minimum °F (°C)	−22.8 (−30.4)	−19.5 (−28.6)	−6.9 (−21.6)	14.2 (−9.9)	28.8 (−1.8)	41.7 (5.4)	46.0 (7.8)	44.0 (6.7)	30.7 (−0.7)	17.1 (−8.3)	10.8 (−11.8)	−16.2 (−26.8)	−26.3 (−32.4)
Record low °F (°C)	−47 (−44)	−39 (−39)	−28 (−33)	−1 (−18)	12 (−11)	26 (−3)	34 (1)	29 (−2)	12 (−11)	−8 (−22)	−26 (−32)	−37 (−38)	−47 (−44)
Average precipitation inches (mm)	0.71 (18)	0.89 (23)	0.96 (24)	1.52 (39)	3.11 (79)	3.40 (86)	2.90 (74)	2.65 (67)	2.40 (61)	2.20 (56)	0.78 (20)	0.75 (19)	22.27 (566)
Average snowfall inches (cm)	9.7 (25)	7.1 (18)	7.8 (20)	4.5 (11)	0.0 (0.0)	0.0 (0.0)	0.0 (0.0)	0.0 (0.0)	0.0 (0.0)	1.5 (3.8)	7.4 (19)	8.7 (22)	46.7 (118.8)
Average precipitation days (≥ 0.01 in)	4.5	4.6	5.0	6.8	10.4	10.9	9.5	7.5	7.4	6.8	5.1	4.5	83.0
Average snowy days (≥ 0.1 in)	4.8	4.1	3.5	1.3	0.0	0.0	0.0	0.0	0.0	0.7	3.5	5.0	22.9
Source: NOAA

== Demographics ==
Historical population
Census	Pop.	Note	%±
1890	935		—
1900	1,046		11.9%
1910	1,758		68.1%
1920	1,855		5.5%
1930	1,650		−11.1%
1940	1,997		21.0%
1950	2,031		1.7%
1960	2,093		3.1%
1970	2,090		−0.1%
1980	2,283		9.2%
1990	2,177		−4.6%
2000	2,292		5.3%
2010	2,154		−6.0%
2020	2,204		2.3%
2024 (est.)	2,175		−1.3%
U.S. Decennial Census; 2020 Census

=== 2020 census ===
As of the 2020 census, Lisbon had a population of 2,204. The median age was 43.6 years. 22.5% of residents were under the age of 18 and 25.0% of residents were 65 years of age or older. For every 100 females there were 106.8 males, and for every 100 females age 18 and over there were 107.7 males age 18 and over.

0.0% of residents lived in urban areas, while 100.0% lived in rural areas.

There were 922 households in Lisbon, of which 27.0% had children under the age of 18 living in them. Of all households, 46.2% were married-couple households, 20.7% were households with a male householder and no spouse or partner present, and 26.1% were households with a female householder and no spouse or partner present. About 36.6% of all households were made up of individuals and 16.3% had someone living alone who was 65 years of age or older.

There were 1,038 housing units, of which 11.2% were vacant. The homeowner vacancy rate was 1.4% and the rental vacancy rate was 14.7%.

Racial composition as of the 2020 census
Race	Number	Percent
White	2,042	92.6%
Black or African American	19	0.9%
American Indian and Alaska Native	5	0.2%
Asian	18	0.8%
Native Hawaiian and Other Pacific Islander	0	0.0%
Some other race	35	1.6%
Two or more races	85	3.9%
Hispanic or Latino (of any race)	65	2.9%

=== 2010 census ===
As of the census of 2010, there were 2,154 people, 966 households, and 531 families living in the city. The population density was 957.3 inhabitants per square mile (369.6/km^{2}). There were 1,090 housing units at an average density of 484.4 per square mile (187.0/km^{2}). The racial makeup of the city was 97.0% White, 0.5% African American, 0.5% Native American, 0.6% Asian, 0.1% Pacific Islander, 0.2% from other races, and 1.1% from two or more races. Hispanic or Latino of any race were 1.3% of the population.

There were 966 households, of which 26.0% had children under the age of 18 living with them, 45.1% were married couples living together, 6.8% had a female householder with no husband present, 3.0% had a male householder with no wife present, and 45.0% were non-families. 41.5% of all households were made up of individuals, and 21.8% had someone living alone who was 65 years of age or older. The average household size was 2.09 and the average family size was 2.86.

The median age in the city was 46.4 years. 21.9% of residents were under the age of 18; 5.4% were between the ages of 18 and 24; 20.6% were from 25 to 44; 28.8% were from 45 to 64; and 23.3% were 65 years of age or older. The gender makeup of the city was 50.3% male and 49.7% female.

=== 2000 census ===
As of the census of 2000, there were 2,292 people, 948 households, and 571 families living in the city. The population density was 1,019.7 inhabitants per square mile (393.7/km^{2}). There were 1,017 housing units at an average density of 452.4 per square mile (174.7/km^{2}). The racial makeup of the city was 98.65% White, 0.04% African American, 0.39% Native American, 0.26% Asian, and 0.65% from two or more races. Hispanic or Latino of any race were 0.44% of the population.

There were 948 households, out of which 29.1% had children under the age of 18 living with them, 52.1% were married couples living together, 6.2% had a female householder with no husband present, and 39.7% were non-families. 37.6% of all households were made up of individuals, and 20.3% had someone living alone who was 65 years of age or older. The average household size was 2.19 and the average family size was 2.90.

In the city, the population was spread out, with 21.9% under the age of 18, 6.2% from 18 to 24, 23.7% from 25 to 44, 21.6% from 45 to 64, and 26.7% who were 65 years of age or older. The median age was 44 years. For every 100 females, there were 104.8 males. For every 100 females age 18 and over, there were 100.4 males.

The median income for a household in the city was $38,024, and the median income for a family was $47,566. Males had a median income of $36,917 versus $18,315 for females. The per capita income for the city was $18,757. About 0.3% of families and 4.7% of the population were below the poverty line, including 0.8% of those under age 18 and 8.4% of those age 65 or over.

== Notable people ==
- Ray Boyle (1923–2022), actor who was known for starring as Wyatt Earp's brother Morgan Earp in the ABC western television series The Life and Legend of Wyatt Earp
