= List of North Dakota locations by per capita income =

North Dakota ranks 19th highest nationwide in per capita personal income. Per Capita Personal Income of $70,966 in North Dakota and Per Capita Personal Income of $72,425 in the United States in 2024.

== North Dakota Counties Ranked by Per Capita Income in 2023 ==
Note: Data is from the 2023 United States Census Estimate Data and the 2019-2023 American Community Survey 5-Year Estimates.

Rank	County	Per Capita Personal Income (2023)	Median Household Income (2023)	Median Family Income (2010)	Population (2024)	Number of Households (2023)	Number of Housing Units (2024)
1	Cavalier	$106,795	$67,064	$57,066	3,567	1,539	2,106
2	Dunn	$103,731	$94,688	$65,122	4,031	1,513	2,158
3	Towner	$101,180	$63,017	$54,609	2,051	958	1,283
4	Dickey	$99,866	$63,125	$53,333	4,930	1,953	2,392
5	Steele	$97,896	$80,313	$54,625	1,767	731	1,107
6	Sargent	$96,135	$77,697	$59,531	3,710	1,734	2,010
7	Renville	$94,262	$76,311	$63,068	2,376	922	1,285
8	LaMoure	$91,051	$70,263	$60,932	4,051	1,712	2,056
9	Billings	$89,603	$81,250	$61,250	1,063	372	615
10	Wells	$89,429	$61,346	$52,400	3,803	1,808	2,330
11	Burke	$89,281	$96,339	$62,283	2,154	931	1,383
12	Griggs	$86,194	$64,737	$51,570	2,227	946	1,371
13	McKenzie	$84,357	$88,289	$58,906	14,782	5,910	7,878
14	Pembina	$83,598	$66,884	$61,804	6,588	2,959	3,492
15	Eddy	$83,562	$55,389	$47,857	2,309	1,142	1,234
16	Nelson	$83,523	$68,051	$51,731	3,007	1,295	1,781
17	Foster	$83,274	$83,412	$55,278	3,323	1,515	1,790
18	Bottineau	$82,191	$83,460	$60,714	6,391	2,695	3,979
19	Mountrail	$80,515	$81,292	$63,238	9,474	3,839	5,176
20	Ransom	$78,909	$74,521	$59,973	5,590	2,305	2,553
21	Kidder	$77,327	$61,850	$47,981	2,371	1,129	1,636
22	McHenry	$75,774	$80,614	$54,350	5,135	2,265	2,826
23	Williams	$75,412	$90,224	$67,875	40,763	15,308	20,474
24	Burleigh	$75,321	$84,948	$71,103	103,107	40,361	44,534
25	McIntosh	$74,321	$64,236	$46,198	2,461	1,191	1,694
26	Barnes	$74,136	$70,230	$59,558	10,798	4,852	5,719
27	Cass	$73,185	$75,023	$68,858	200,945	81,668	92,465
28	McLean	$72,821	$81,847	$62,686	9,845	4,261	5,862
29	Traill	$72,754	$88,289	$60,054	7,989	3,316	3,659
30	Bowman	$72,257	$83,773	$27,354	2,886	1,237	1,638
—	North Dakota	$72,041	$75,949	$62,920	796,568	325,079	383,085
31	Logan	$72,030	$61,339	$52,262	1,880	773	1,078
32	Stark	$71,645	$80,744	$62,560	33,767	13,217	15,645
33	Richland	$70,746	$72,524	$64,636	16,658	6,764	7,620
34	Walsh	$70,222	$69,976	$58,429	10,214	4,450	5,196
35	Emmons	$69,003	$67,368	$45,464	3,209	1,516	2,123
36	Divide	$68,807	$89,297	$65,000	2,124	935	1,399
—	United States	$68,531	$78,538	$62,982	340,110,988	127,482,865	146,770,711
37	Stutsman	$68,370	$60,172	$60,171	21,546	9,295	10,434
38	Sheridan	$67,934	$67,361	$43,906	1,268	676	821
39	Ramsey	$67,469	$61,319	$56,632	11,510	5,185	5,899
40	Mercer	$66,823	$79,405	$71,075	8,348	3,594	4,685
41	Pierce	$66,771	$63,214	$55,304	3,853	1,840	2,049
42	Ward	$66,524	$79,273	$60,361	68,427	28,290	32,731
43	Morton	$63,288	$79,483	$62,713	34,194	13,529	15,687
44	Grand Forks	$63,280	$68,450	$65,804	73,771	31,045	34,140
45	Benson	$60,006	$68,049	$34,597	5,756	1,922	2,549
46	Rolette	$56,859	$57,355	$35,523	11,692	3,686	4,596
47	Oliver	$55,494	$76,953	$75,069	1,882	727	922
48	Hettinger	$55,263	$70,827	$49,605	2,419	1,107	1,394
49	Adams	$54,673	$55,417	$50,227	2,141	1,019	1,362
50	Grant	$53,999	$56,750	$53,542	2,247	1,072	1,669
51	Golden Valley	$49,510	$76,528	$47,500	1,795	663	911
52	Slope	$47,105	$62,500	$55,833	660	340	410
53	Sioux	$37,765	$41,676	$31,098	3,713	1,067	1,279

=== North Dakota Places Ranked by Per Capita Income in 2014 ===
1. $122,575 – Nash
2. $94,928 – Briarwood
3. $86,316 – Calvin
4. $67,138 – Harmon
5. $63,897 – Kramer
6. $62,625 – Calio
7. $61,109 – Springbrook
8. $52,435 – Oxbow
9. $51,120 – Luverne
10. $50,388 – Kief
11. $49,274 – Edinburg
12. $46,649 – Frontier
13. $46,588 – Mylo
14. $46,396 – Osnabrock
15. $45,623 – Ambrose
16. $45,322 – Wildrose
17. $44,925 – Prairie Rose
18. $44,172 – Lignite
19. $43,616 – Ross
20. $43,331 – Milton
21. $42,856 – Horace
22. $42,363 – Williston
23. $42,175 – Heil
24. $41,809 – Fairdale
25. $41,785 – Hamilton
26. $40,650 – Ayr
27. $40,250 – Tolley
28. $39,669 – Elliott
29. $39,433 – Buchanan
30. $39,132 – Nekoma
31. $38,875 – Englevale
32. $38,659 – Courtenay
33. $38,538 – Fingal
34. $38,387 – Alamo
35. $38,377 – Fullerton
36. $38,346 – York
37. $38,278 – Amidon
38. $37,978 – Antler
39. $37,523 – Washburn
40. $37,454 – Manning
41. $37,327 – Hope
42. $37,156 – Conway
43. $36,957 – Colfax
44. $36,523 – Foxholm
45. $36,475 – Hurdsfield
46. $36,429 – Overly
47. $36,103 – Robinson
48. $36,006 – Abercrombie
49. $36,003 – Hampden
50. $35,838 – Hannaford
51. $35,835 – Bowbells
52. $35,795 – Epping
53. $35,672 – Reile's Acres
54. $35,646 – Hettinger
55. $35,572 – Wheatland
56. $35,543 – Cayuga
57. $35,401 – Tioga
58. $35,397 – Arthur
59. $34,963 – Raleigh
60. $34,816 – Stanley
61. $34,801 – Alexander
62. $34,624 – Martin
63. $34,476 – Marion
64. $34,416 – Argusville
65. $34,407 – Bucyrus
66. $34,319 – Crystal
67. $34,117 – Carpio
68. $34,057 – Michigan City
69. $33,954 – Clifford
70. $33,892 – Canton City
71. $33,888 – Taylor
72. $33,805 – North River
73. $33,687 – Regent
74. $33,643 – Christine
75. $33,478 – Langdon
76. $33,403 – Valley City
77. $33,378 – Berthold
78. $33,377 – Rocklake
79. $33,330 – Karlsruhe
80. $33,211 – Braddock
81. $33,155 – Watford City
82. $33,069 – Sheldon
83. $32,944 – Ray
84. $32,931 – Richardton
85. $32,916 – Medora
86. $32,702 – Bismarck
87. $32,655 – Beulah
88. $32,623 – Riverdale
89. $32,612 – Sheyenne
90. $32,577 – Surrey
91. $32,485 – Dickinson
92. $32,244 – Crosby
93. $32,186 – Sykeston
94. $32,141 – Forest River
95. $32,138 – Alsen
96. $32,129 – West Fargo
97. $32,087 – Brooktree Park
98. $32,004 – Litchville
99. $31,929 – Dickey
100. $31,842 – Menoken
101. $31,831 – Rutland
102. $31,727 – Bowman
103. $31,459 – Harwood
104. $31,423 – Niagara
105. $31,345 – Ludden
106. $31,244 – Des Lacs
107. $31,096 – Bottineau
108. $31,096 – Burlington
109. $31,090 – Coleharbor
110. $30,996 – Lawton
111. $30,854 – Galesburg
112. $30,783 – Minnewaukan
113. $30,667 – Halliday
114. $30,640 – Gwinner
115. $30,590 – Lehr
116. $30,546 – Hamberg
117. $30,544 – Gascoyne
118. $30,494 – Noonan
119. $30,491 – Rhame
120. $30,425 – Grenora
121. $30,384 – Carrington
122. $30,342 – Sarles
123. $30,156 – Lansford
124. $30,146 – Forman
125. $30,068 – Edmore
126. $30,022 – Leonard
127. $30,011 – Fessenden
128. $30,002 – Plaza
129. $29,986 – Fargo
130. $29,961 – Thompson
131. $29,957 – Minot
132. $29,926 – Selz
133. $29,909 – Hunter
134. $29,909 – Sherwood
135. $29,906 – Streeter
136. $29,827 – Hazen
137. $29,732 – Hansboro
138. $29,683 – Casselton
139. $29,678 – Tower City
140. $29,659 – Dunn Center
141. $29,585 – Anamoose
142. $29,585 – Pembina
143. $29,583 – Towner
144. $29,525 – Mott
145. $29,505 – Sawyer
146. $29,466 – Westhope
147. $29,465 – Kensal
148. $29,300 – Rogers
149. $29,275 – Edgeley
150. $29,233 – Turtle Lake
151. $29,191 – Killdeer
152. $29,137 – Mandan
153. $29,118 – Reynolds
154. $29,113 – Underwood
155. $29,101 – Leeds
156. $29,044 – Fordville
157. $28,898 – Milnor
158. $28,892 – Cando
159. $28,773 – Tolna
160. $28,763 – Mohall
161. $28,736 – Crary
162. $28,706 – Cogswell
163. $28,702 – Cavalier
164. $28,685 – South Heart
165. $28,528 – Spiritwood Lake
166. $28,461 – Mooreton
167. $28,351 – Logan
168. $28,270 – Verona
169. $28,253 – Donnybrook
170. $28,189 – Belfield
171. $28,033 – Nome
172. $27,929 – Flasher
173. $27,910 – Fredonia
174. $27,907 – Lisbon
175. $27,827 – Egeland
176. $27,806 – Park River
177. $27,777 – Napoleon
178. $27,735 – Lankin
179. $27,726 – Fort Ransom
180. $27,693 – Powers Lake
181. $27,662 – Drayton
182. $27,655 – Hankinson
183. $27,601 – Mayville
184. $27,539 – Portal
185. $27,532 – Sutton
186. $27,527 – Buffalo
187. $27,478 – Jamestown
188. $27,457 – Churchs Ferry
189. $27,393 – Dahlen
190. $27,385 – Munich
191. $27,378 – Elgin
192. $27,375 – Stanton
193. $27,333 – Buxton
194. $27,311 – McVille
195. $27,286 – Hillsboro
196. $27,275 – Walcott
197. $27,263 – Scranton
198. $27,254 – Manvel
199. $27,210 – Golden Valley
200. $27,193 – Havana
201. $27,114 – New Leipzig
202. $27,060 – Steele
203. $27,058 – Pick City
204. $27,014 – Aneta
205. $26,968 – Grand Forks
206. $26,937 – Wimbledon
207. $26,837 – Center
208. $26,820 – Parshall
209. $26,676 – Adams
210. $26,606 – Kulm
211. $26,581 – Kenmare
212. $26,572 – LaMoure
213. $26,538 – Granville
214. $26,514 – Glenburn
215. $26,491 – Lakota
216. $26,284 – Oakes
217. $26,283 – Max
218. $26,281 – Wahpeton
219. $26,264 – Beach
220. $26,234 – Leal
221. $26,220 – Sibley
222. $26,208 – Zap
223. $26,131 – Balfour
224. $26,082 – Forbes
225. $26,051 – Tappen
226. $26,013 – Barney
227. $26,012 – Cooperstown
228. $25,944 – McClusky
229. $25,936 – Hannah
230. $25,922 – Garrison
231. $25,839 – Denhoff
232. $25,834 – Neche
233. $25,823 – Wilton
234. $25,817 – Bisbee
235. $25,756 – Mapleton
236. $25,748 – Sentinel Butte
237. $25,718 – New Salem
238. $25,712 – Wishek
239. $25,685 – Kindred
240. $25,633 – Davenport
241. $25,580 – Glen Ullin
242. $25,517 – Reeder
243. $25,435 – Lincoln
244. $25,390 – Flaxton
245. $25,363 – New England
246. $25,302 – Maddock
247. $25,219 – Grafton
248. $25,214 – Jud
249. $25,181 – St. Thomas
250. $25,119 – Wing
251. $25,086 – Pingree
252. $25,024 – Gilby
253. $25,004 – Sharon
254. $24,975 – Grandin
255. $24,943 – Ashley
256. $24,857 – Wales
257. $24,804 – Goodrich
258. $24,737 – Alice
259. $24,707 – Warwick
260. $24,663 – Glenfield
261. $24,610 – Hebron
262. $24,561 – Hague
263. $24,537 – Jessie
264. $24,524 – Dwight
265. $24,420 – Enderlin
266. $24,418 – Gladstone
267. $24,322 – Finley
268. $24,265 – Esmond
269. $24,216 – New Rockford
270. $24,203 – Grace City
271. $24,193 – Hoople
272. $24,122 – Deering
273. $24,101 – Sanborn
274. $24,041 – Velva
275. $23,973 – Fairmount
276. $23,814 – Montpelier
277. $23,721 – Devils Lake
278. $23,707 – Pisek
279. $23,697 – Binford
280. $23,690 – Newburg
281. $23,654 – Woodworth
282. $23,652 – Ryder
283. $23,630 – Carson
284. $23,581 – Northwood
285. $23,509 – Bathgate
286. $23,466 – Hazelton
287. $23,411 – Rugby
288. $23,408 – Wyndmere
289. $23,403 – Ypsilanti
290. $23,285 – Rolla
291. $23,171 – Bowdon
292. $23,169 – Strasburg
293. $23,159 – New Town
294. $23,123 – East Fairview
295. $23,107 – Voltaire
296. $23,011 – Zeeland
297. $22,973 – Inkster
298. $22,942 – Lidgerwood
299. $22,933 – Minto
300. $22,872 – Arnegard
301. $22,857 – Portland
302. $22,788 – Oriska
303. $22,744 – Tuttle
304. $22,722 – Walhalla
305. $22,677 – Linton
306. $22,572 – Emerado
307. $22,488 – Gardner
308. $22,427 – Hatton
309. $22,206 – Bantry
310. $22,000 – Amenia
311. $21,911 – Douglas
312. $21,840 – Great Bend
313. $21,743 – Almont
314. $21,619 – Harvey
315. $21,558 – Gardena
316. $21,424 – Golva
317. $21,329 – Pillsbury
318. $21,294 – White Earth
319. $21,288 – Brocket
320. $21,246 – Larimore
321. $21,180 – Medina
322. $20,973 – Mantador
323. $20,937 – Embden
324. $20,867 – Gackle
325. $20,860 – Perth
326. $20,835 – Palermo
327. $20,821 – Drake
328. $20,792 – Erie
329. $20,618 – Dawson
330. $20,583 – Bergen
331. $20,463 – Page
332. $20,364 – Leith
333. $20,347 – Landa
334. $20,293 – Mercer
335. $20,139 – Wolford
336. $20,127 – Berlin
337. $19,963 – Ruthville
338. $19,601 – Columbus
339. $19,544 – Petersburg
340. $19,511 – Rolette
341. $19,508 – Pekin
342. $19,450 – Willow City
343. $19,338 – Makoti
344. $19,324 – Marmarth
345. $19,147 – Driscoll
346. $19,089 – Knox
347. $18,961 – Cleveland
348. $18,855 – Mountain
349. $18,767 – Butte
350. $18,738 – Maxbass
351. $18,708 – Solen
352. $18,538 – Pettibone
353. $18,365 – Ellendale
354. $18,282 – De Lamere
355. $18,263 – Kathryn
356. $18,124 – St. John
357. $18,107 – Haynes
358. $17,976 – Monango
359. $17,934 – Dazey
360. $17,704 – Fortuna
361. $17,600 – McLeod
362. $17,472 – Grand Forks Air Force Base
363. $17,435 – Souris
364. $17,410 – Dodge
365. $16,845 – Starkweather
366. $16,744 – Minot Air Force Base
367. $16,149 – Shell Valley
368. $16,076 – Upham
369. $15,450 – Cathay
370. $15,387 – Brinsmade
371. $14,979 – White Shield
372. $14,453 – Ardoch
373. $14,411 – Fort Yates
374. $13,792 – Oberon
375. $13,690 – McHenry
376. $13,660 – Balta
377. $12,542 – Benedict
378. $11,933 – Dunseith
379. $11,908 – Belcourt
380. $11,554 – Selfridge
381. $11,458 – Loma
382. $9,735 – Four Bears Village
383. $9,674 – Cannon Ball
384. $9,145 – Mandaree
385. $8,770 – Venturia
386. $8,616 – Regan
387. $8,599 – Porcupine
388. $7,649 – Fort Totten
389. $6,965 – East Dunseith
390. $4,600 – Ruso
391. $3,584 – Green Acres
