= Ypsilanti (disambiguation) =

Ypsilanti is a city in Washtenaw County, Michigan, United States.

Ypsilanti may also refer to:

== Other places in the United States ==
- Ypsilanti, Georgia
- Ypsilanti Charter Township, Michigan, surrounding the city of Ypsilanti
- Ypsilanti Township, Stutsman County, North Dakota
  - Ypsilanti, North Dakota

== People with the name Ypsilanti or Ypsilantis ==
- Ypsilantis family, or Ypsilanti, a Greek Phanariot family, including a list of notable family members
- Andrea Ypsilanti (born 1957), German politician

== See also ==
- Dimitrios Ypsilantis (municipality), in Kozani regional unit, West Macedonia, Greece
