= Stutsman County, North Dakota =

County in North Dakota, United States

- County
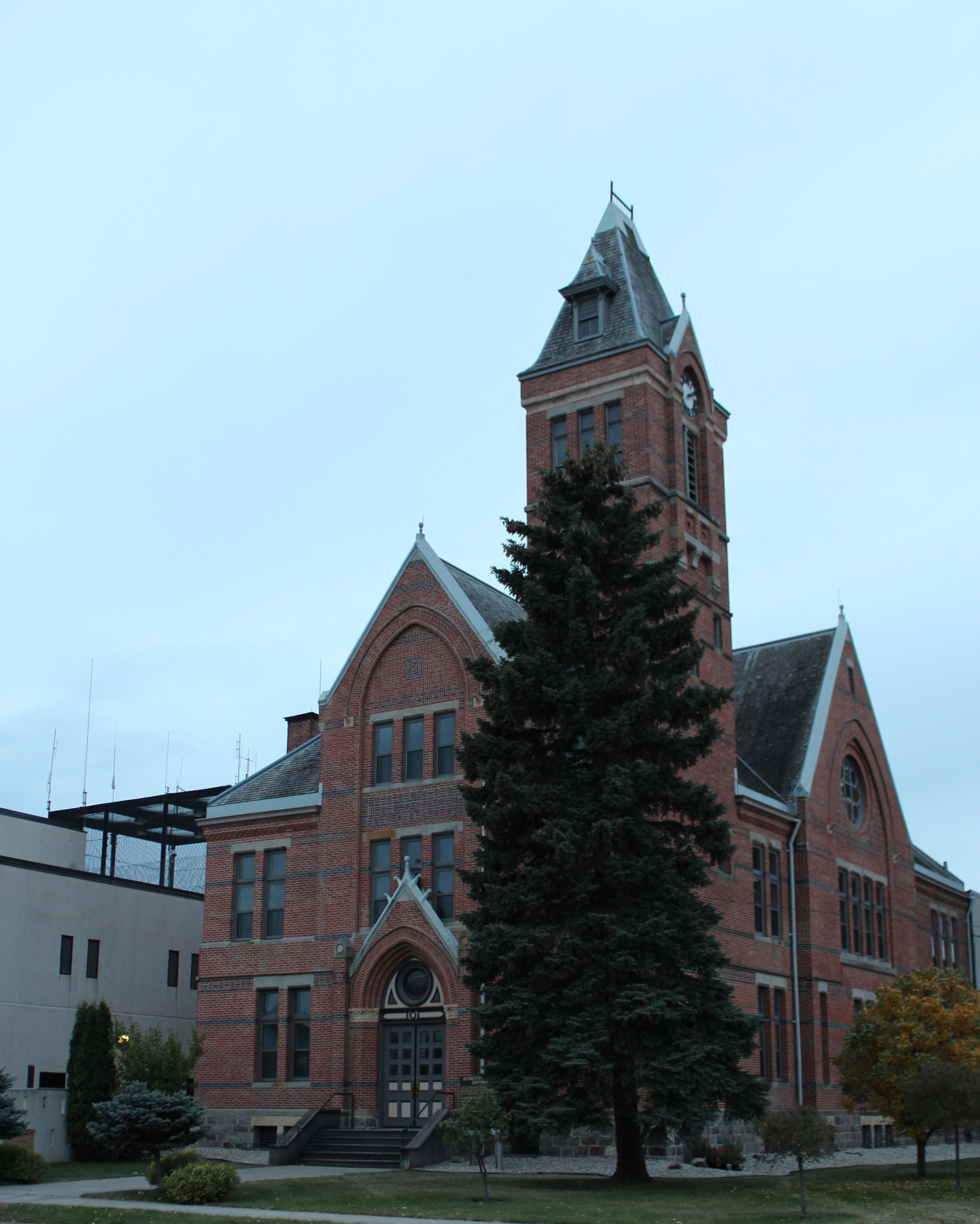
- Historic Stutsman County Courthouse

- Logo

- Location within the U.S. state of North Dakota
- Coordinates: 46.972223°N 98.956123°W
- Country: United States
- State: North Dakota
- Founded: January 4, 1873 (created); June 10, 1873 (organized)
- Named for: Enos Stutsman
- Seat: Jamestown
- Largest city: Jamestown

Area
  - Total: 2,298.071 sq mi (5,951.98 km^{2})
  - Land: 2,221.904 sq mi (5,754.70 km^{2})
  - Water: 76.167 sq mi (197.27 km^{2}) 3.31%

Population (2020)
  - Total: 21,593
  - Estimate (2025): 21,414 ▼
  - Density: 9.697/sq mi (3.744/km^{2})
- Time zone: UTC−6 (Central)
  - Summer (DST): UTC−5 (CDT)
- Area code: 701
- Congressional district: At-large
- Website: stutsmancounty.gov

Stutsman County is a county in the U.S. state of North Dakota. As of the 2020 census, the population was 21,593, and was estimated to be 21,414 in 2025, making it the 8th-most populous county in North Dakota. The county seat and the largest city is Jamestown.

Stutsman County comprises the Jamestown, North Dakota micropolitan statistical area.

== History ==
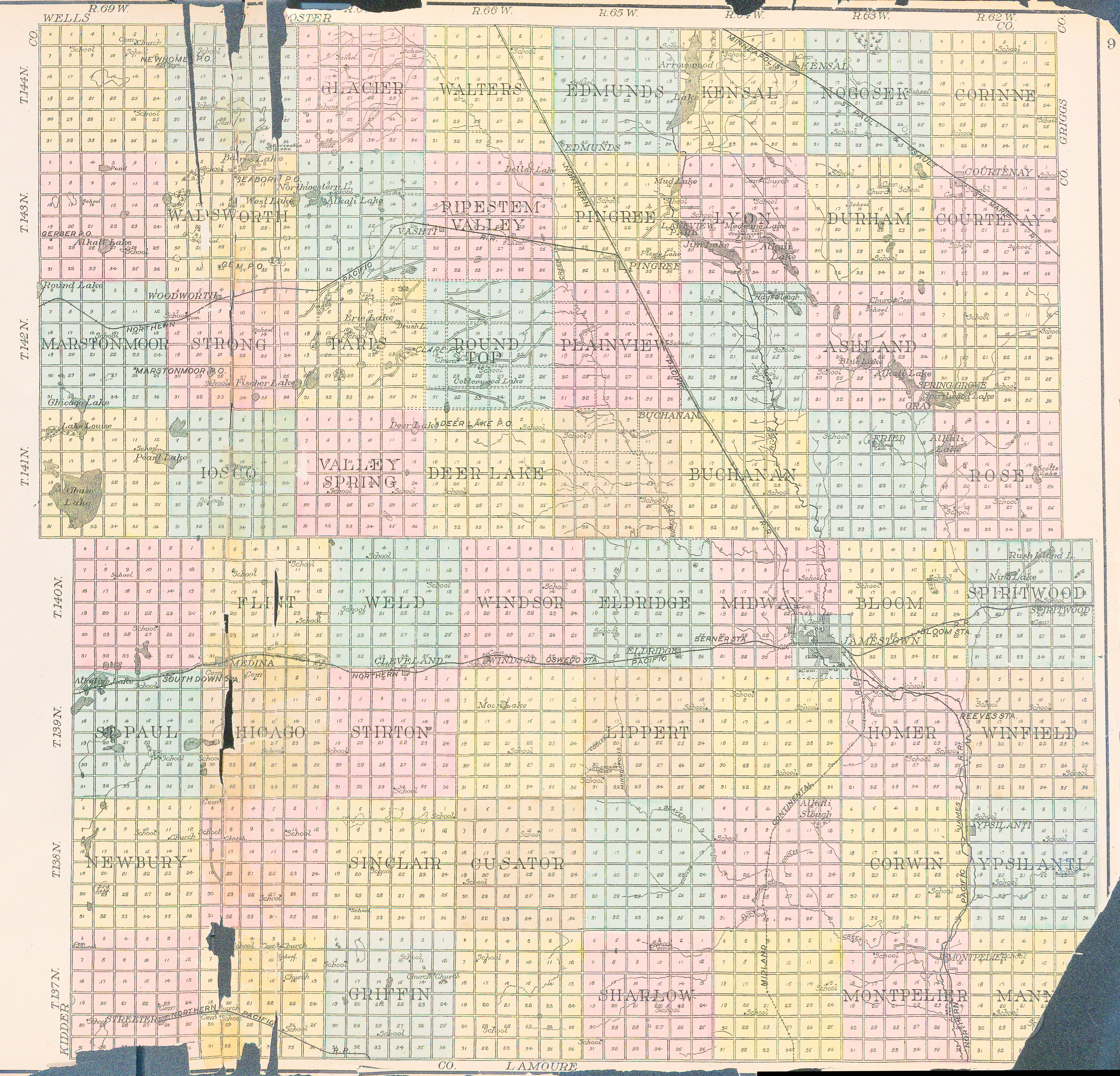
Outline map of Stutsman County, North Dakota, 1911

The Dakota Territory legislature created the county on January 4, 1873, with area partitioned from Buffalo and Pembina counties. It was not organized at that time, nor was it attached to another county for administrative or judicial purposes. It was named for Enos Stutsman, an area lawyer and politician. On June 10 of the same year, the county organization was effected, with Jamestown as the county seat. Its boundaries have not changed since its creation.

== Geography ==
The James River flows south-southeasterly through the east central part of the county. The terrain consists of low rolling hills, dotted with lakes and ponds in its western portion. The area is largely devoted to agriculture. The terrain slopes to the east and south; its highest point is a hill at the southwestern corner, at 1,965 ft (599 m) ASL.

According to the United States Census Bureau, the county has a total area of 2,298.071 square miles (5,951.98 km^{2}), of which 2,221.904 square miles (5,754.70 km^{2}) is land and 76.167 square miles (197.27 km^{2}) (3.31%) is water. It is the 2nd largest county in North Dakota by total area.

=== Major highways ===
- I-94
- US 52
- US 52 Truck
- US 281
- US 281 Truck
- ND 9
- ND 20
- ND 30
- ND 36
- ND 46

=== Transit ===
- Jefferson Lines

=== Adjacent counties ===
- Foster County - north
- Griggs County - northeast
- Barnes County - east
- LaMoure County - southeast
- Logan County - southwest
- Kidder County - west
- Wells County - northwest

=== Protected areas ===
- Arrowwood National Wildlife Refuge (part)
- Chase Lake National Wildlife Refuge
- Halfway Lake National Wildlife Refuge
- National Audubon Society Alkali Lake Wildlife Refuge

=== Lakes ===
- Alkali Lake
- Arrowwood Lake
- Barnes Lake
- Big Mallard Marsh
- Blair Slough
- Blue Lake
- Chase Lake
- Chicago Lake
- Colby Lake
- Eric Lake
- Fischer Lake
- Fisher Lake
- Jamestown Reservoir
- Jim Lake
- Moon Lake
- Mud Lake
- Northwest Lake
- Pearl Lake
- Prairie Lake
- Prairie Pothole
- Runner Slough
- School Lake
- Spiritwood Lake
- Trautman Slough
- West Lake

== Demographics ==
Historical population
Census	Pop.	Note	%±
1880	1,007		—
1890	5,266		422.9%
1900	9,143		73.6%
1910	18,189		98.9%
1920	24,575		35.1%
1930	26,100		6.2%
1940	23,495		−10.0%
1950	24,158		2.8%
1960	25,137		4.1%
1970	23,550		−6.3%
1980	24,154		2.6%
1990	22,241		−7.9%
2000	21,908		−1.5%
2010	21,100		−3.7%
2020	21,593		2.3%
2025 (est.)	21,414	▼	−0.8%
U.S. Decennial Census; 1790–1960 1900–1990; 1990–2000 2010–2020

As of the fourth quarter of 2024, the median home value in Stutsman County was $212,229.

As of the 2023 American Community Survey, there are 9,295 estimated households in Stutsman County with an average of 2.12 persons per household. The county has a median household income of $60,172. Approximately 11.0% of the county's population lives at or below the poverty line. Stutsman County has an estimated 62.5% employment rate, with 24.4% of the population holding a bachelor's degree or higher and 92.8% holding a high school diploma.

The top five reported ancestries (people were allowed to report up to two ancestries, thus the figures will generally add to more than 100%) were English (96.5%), Spanish (1.3%), Indo-European (1.9%), Asian and Pacific Islander (0.1%), and Other (0.3%).

Stutsman County, North Dakota – racial and ethnic composition
Note: the US Census treats Hispanic/Latino as an ethnic category. This table excludes Latinos from the racial categories and assigns them to a separate category. Hispanics/Latinos may be of any race.

Race / ethnicity (NH = non-Hispanic)	Pop. 1980	Pop. 1990	Pop. 2000	Pop. 2010	Pop. 2020
White alone (NH)	23,799 (98.53%)	21,873 (98.35%)	21,241 (96.96%)	19,996 (94.77%)	19,504 (90.33%)
Black or African American alone (NH)	30 (0.12%)	46 (0.21%)	55 (0.25%)	126 (0.60%)	444 (2.06%)
Native American or Alaska Native alone (NH)	134 (0.55%)	140 (0.63%)	197 (0.90%)	297 (1.41%)	296 (1.37%)
Asian alone (NH)	63 (0.26%)	96 (0.43%)	79 (0.36%)	99 (0.47%)	137 (0.63%)
Pacific Islander alone (NH)	—	—	8 (0.04%)	12 (0.06%)	4 (0.02%)
Other race alone (NH)	52 (0.22%)	2 (0.01%)	10 (0.05%)	4 (0.02%)	24 (0.11%)
Mixed race or multiracial (NH)	—	—	114 (0.52%)	205 (0.97%)	591 (2.74%)
Hispanic or Latino (any race)	76 (0.31%)	84 (0.38%)	204 (0.93%)	361 (1.71%)	593 (2.75%)
Total	24,154 (100.00%)	22,241 (100.00%)	21,908 (100.00%)	21,100 (100.00%)	21,593 (100.00%)

=== 2024 estimate ===
As of the 2024 estimate, there were 21,546 people and 9,295 households residing in the county. There were 10,434 housing units at an average density of 4.69 per square mile (1.8/km^{2}). The racial makeup of the county was 92.8% White (90.4% NH White), 2.3% African American, 2.2% Native American, 0.8% Asian, 0.1% Pacific Islander, _% from some other races and 1.8% from two or more races. Hispanic or Latino people of any race were 3.3% of the population.

In the 2023 estimate, Stutsman County is the 39th wealthiest county in North Dakota. $68,370 for per capita income.

=== 2020 census ===
As of the 2020 census, the county had a population of 21,593, 9,084 households, and 5,178 families. The population density was 9.7 inhabitants per square mile (3.7/km^{2}). There were 10,374 housing units at an average density of 4.67 per square mile (1.8/km^{2}).

Of the residents, 20.1% were under the age of 18 and 20.0% were 65 years of age or older; the median age was 41.1 years. For every 100 females there were 104.9 males, and for every 100 females age 18 and over there were 106.7 males.

The racial makeup of the county was 91.34% White, 2.11% African American, 1.39% Native American, 0.63% Asian, 0.02% Pacific Islander, 0.88% from some other races and 3.63% from two or more races. Hispanic or Latino people of any race were 2.75% of the population.

There were 9,084 households in the county, of which 24.4% had children under the age of 18 living with them and 25.0% had a female householder with no spouse or partner present. About 37.0% of all households were made up of individuals and 14.1% had someone living alone who was 65 years of age or older.

There were 10,374 housing units, of which 12.4% were vacant. Among occupied housing units, 65.7% were owner-occupied and 34.3% were renter-occupied. The homeowner vacancy rate was 1.7% and the rental vacancy rate was 13.4%.

=== 2010 census ===
As of the 2010 census, there were 21,100 people, 8,931 households, and 5,255 families in the county. The population density was 9.5 inhabitants per square mile (3.7/km^{2}). There were 9,862 housing units at an average density of 4.44 per square mile (1.71/km^{2}). The racial makeup of the county was 95.56% White, 0.66% African American, 1.42% Native American, 0.47% Asian, 0.06% Pacific Islander, 0.55% from some other races and 1.27% from two or more races. Hispanic or Latino people of any race were 1.71% of the population.

In terms of ancestry, 56.5% were German, 27.6% were Norwegian, 7.2% were Irish, 6.0% were Russian, 5.2% were English, and 2.4% were American.

There were 8,931 households, 25.6% had children under the age of 18 living with them, 47.3% were married couples living together, 7.5% had a female householder with no husband present, 41.2% were non-families, and 35.3% of all households were made up of individuals. The average household size was 2.17 and the average family size was 2.79. The median age was 42.0 years.

The median income for a household in the county was $44,620 and the median income for a family was $60,171. Males had a median income of $40,365 versus $27,549 for females. The per capita income for the county was $23,307. About 6.3% of families and 12.1% of the population were below the poverty line, including 14.5% of those under age 18 and 14.6% of those age 65 or over.

== Communities ==
=== Cities ===
- Buchanan
- Cleveland
- Courtenay
- Jamestown (county seat)
- Kensal
- Medina
- Montpelier
- Pingree
- Spiritwood Lake
- Streeter
- Woodworth

=== Census-designated places ===
- Spiritwood
- Ypsilanti

=== Unincorporated communities ===
- Bloom
- Clementsville
- Durupt
- Fried
- Kloze
- Millarton
- Sharlow
- Sydney
- Vashti

=== Townships ===
- Alexander
- Ashland
- Bloom
- Bloomenfield
- Buchanan
- Chicago
- Conklin
- Corinne
- Corwin
- Courtenay
- Cusator
- Deer Lake
- Durham
- Edmunds
- Eldridge
- Flint
- Fried
- Gerber
- Germania
- Glacier
- Gray
- Griffin
- Hidden
- Homer
- Iosco
- Jim River Valley
- Kensal
- Lenton
- Lippert
- Lowery
- Lyon
- Manns
- Marstonmoor
- Midway
- Montpelier
- Moon Lake
- Newbury
- Nogosek
- Paris
- Peterson
- Pingree
- Pipestem Valley
- Plainview
- Rose
- Round Top
- St. Paul
- Severn
- Sharlow
- Sinclair
- Spiritwood
- Stirton
- Streeter
- Strong
- Sydney
- Valley Spring
- Wadsworth
- Walters
- Weld
- Windsor
- Winfield
- Woodbury
- Ypsilanti

== Politics ==
Stutsman County voters have been reliably Republican for several decades. In no national election since 1964 has the county selected the Democratic Party candidate.

United States presidential election results for Stutsman County, North Dakota
Year	Republican		Democratic		Third party(ies)	
Year	No.	%	No.	%	No.	%
1900	1,077	59.11%	711	39.02%	34	1.87%
1904	1,856	78.25%	453	19.10%	63	2.66%
1908	1,777	55.67%	1,344	42.11%	71	2.22%
1912	757	28.30%	1,100	41.12%	818	30.58%
1916	1,664	45.68%	1,846	50.67%	133	3.65%
1920	5,531	77.41%	1,394	19.51%	220	3.08%
1924	3,952	56.68%	463	6.64%	2,558	36.68%
1928	4,782	55.07%	3,873	44.60%	29	0.33%
1932	2,577	29.03%	6,182	69.63%	119	1.34%
1936	2,725	29.09%	5,564	59.39%	1,080	11.53%
1940	5,634	58.92%	3,897	40.76%	31	0.32%
1944	4,220	56.20%	3,243	43.19%	46	0.61%
1948	4,208	52.88%	3,415	42.92%	334	4.20%
1952	6,713	67.70%	3,156	31.83%	47	0.47%
1956	5,718	59.85%	3,825	40.04%	11	0.12%
1960	5,905	56.78%	4,481	43.09%	13	0.13%
1964	3,990	42.12%	5,463	57.66%	21	0.22%
1968	5,162	56.21%	3,532	38.46%	490	5.34%
1972	6,269	62.51%	3,589	35.79%	170	1.70%
1976	5,653	52.44%	4,883	45.30%	244	2.26%
1980	6,545	63.86%	2,573	25.10%	1,131	11.04%
1984	6,591	64.57%	3,495	34.24%	122	1.20%
1988	5,375	55.59%	4,214	43.58%	80	0.83%
1992	4,039	40.39%	3,313	33.13%	2,649	26.49%
1996	3,784	44.04%	3,589	41.77%	1,220	14.20%
2000	5,488	60.19%	3,067	33.64%	563	6.17%
2004	6,517	64.38%	3,438	33.97%	167	1.65%
2008	5,499	56.20%	4,056	41.46%	229	2.34%
2012	5,685	59.48%	3,585	37.51%	288	3.01%
2016	6,718	66.15%	2,498	24.60%	939	9.25%
2020	6,994	70.23%	2,676	26.87%	289	2.90%
2024	7,185	70.90%	2,692	26.56%	257	2.54%

== Education ==
School districts include:

- Barnes County North Public School District 7
- Carrington Public School District 10
- Gackle-Streeter Public School District 56
- Jamestown Public School District 1
- Kensal Public School District 19
- Kidder County Public School District 1
- Litchville-Marion Public School District 46
- Medina Public School District 3
- Montpelier Public School District 14
- Pingree-Buchanan Public School District 10

== See also ==
- National Register of Historic Places listings in Stutsman County, North Dakota
- North Dakota statistical areas
