= Maple Valley Public School District =

School district in North Dakota, United States

Address
- 207 Broadway Tower City, North Dakota, 58071; United States

District information
- Motto: "Attend, Engage, Succeed"
- Grades: Pre-school - 12
- Established: 1975; 51 years ago
- Superintendent: Dan Larson
- NCES District ID: 3812020

Students and staff
- Enrollment: 238 (2021-2022)
- Student–teacher ratio: 12.05
- District mascot: Raiders
- Colors: Royal Blue/Red/White

Other information
- Website: www.myraiders.org

The Maple Valley Public School District (MVSD #4 or MVPSD) is a public school district in Barnes and Cass counties in the U.S. state of North Dakota, based in Tower City. It also serves Buffalo, Fingal, and Oriska.

== Schools ==
The school district was initially created with the merger of the Buffalo Public School and Tower City Public School after the 1975 school year. Fingal Public School would merge with the new district starting the 1980 school year and Oriska would later join to create the Maple Valley-Oriska School District in 2001, but eventually fully consolidating as the Maple Valley Public School District for the 2002-2003 school year.

The Maple Valley Public School District operated with two elementary schools: one in Oriska and one in Buffalo with a high school facility in Tower City from the 2001 school year until the fall of 2018. Fingal originally hosted an elementary school as well up until the spring of 2000.

Starting in the fall of 2018, all district students were moved into one K-12 facility in Tower City, although the gymnasium in Oriska is still used for some junior high and elementary athletics.

According to the North Dakota Department of Public Instruction, the school district's enrollment totaled at 214 students for grades Kindergarten through 12th Grade for the 2018–2019 school year.

== Athletics & Activities ==
Partnering with the North Dakota High School Activities Association, the school district offers the following activities sponsored by the individual district: Girls Volleyball, Girls Basketball, Boys Basketball, Vocal/Instrumental Music, One Act Play. The district partnered with Enderlin Public Schools to offer Football, Baseball, Boys Golf, Girls Golf, Softball, Boys Track & Field, Girls Track & Field, and Speech through the 2021 school year. The district partners with Valley City Public Schools to sponsor Boys Cross Country, Girls Cross Country (discontinued in the spring of 2021), and Wrestling. The district also works with Jamestown Public Schools to offer Boys Ice Hockey. As of the fall of 2021, the district is in a cooperative sponsorship with neighboring Hope-Page Public Schools in offering all of its activities including athletics and fine arts.

Through their individual sports and activities, the teams are known as the "Raiders" with school colors consisting of royal blue, red, and white. While partnered with the Enderlin Public School, the teams were referred to as the "Enderlin/Maple Valley Falcons" with colors of red, black, and white. Since co-oping with Hope-Page Schools in 2021, the teams are all known as the "Maple River Raiders” and the colors have returned to royal blue, red, and white.

The school is also home to the unofficial North Dakota Class B leading scorer in the history of North Dakota Girls Basketball, Rylee Nudell, who finished her high school career with 3,458 points and also holds the state rebounding record for ND Girls Basketball with 1,761 career rebounds.

Notable State-Level Athletic/Activity Accomplishments
Year	Activity	Finish
1976	Buffalo-Tower City Girls Track & Field	State Champions
1981	Maple Valley Girls Basketball	State Tournament Appearance
1991	Maple Valley Girls Basketball	State Tournament Appearance
2010	Enderlin/Maple Valley Baseball	State Tournament Appearance
2012	Enderlin/Maple Valley Softball	State Champions
2013	Enderlin/Maple Valley Softball	State Tournament Appearance
2014	Enderlin/Maple Valley Softball	State Tournament Appearance
2014	Enderlin/Maple Valley Speech	State Co-Champions
2017	Enderlin/Maple Valley Speech	State Champions
2018	Enderlin/Maple Valley Baseball	State Tournament Appearance
2018	Enderlin/Maple Valley Speech	State Champions
