= Jamestown High School (North Dakota) =

Coordinates: 46°55′06″N 98°41′11″W

Location
- 1509 10th St NE; Jamestown, North Dakota; USA

Information
- Type: Public
- Principal: Darby Heinert
- Staff: 65.00 (FTE)
- Grades: 9-12
- Enrollment: 759 (2023–2024)
- Student to teacher ratio: 11.68
- Colors: Royal blue and white
- Mascot: Blue Jay
- District: Jamestown Public Schools
- Website: Jamestown High School

Jamestown High School is a public high school located in Jamestown, North Dakota. It is a part of the Jamestown Public Schools system. The school athletic teams are known as the Blue Jays.

== Athletics ==
=== Championships ===
- State Class 'A' boys' basketball: 1939, 1976, 1978, 1982, 1987, 1993, 2019
- State Class 'A' girls' basketball: 1974
- State Class 'A' football: 1933, 1937, 2021, 2022
- State Class 'A' boys' track and field: 1953
- State Class 'A' girls' volleyball: 2013
- State Class 'A' boys' cross country: 1978, 1997

== Other activities ==
- Drama
- Speech
- Band
- Choir
- Vocal Jazz
- Show Choir
- Jazz Band
- Orchestra
- Science Olympiad
- DECA
- FBLA
- SkillsUSA
- VICA
- Blue Jay News
- Debate
- Yearbook
- German Club
- Spanish Club
- NHS
- SADD
- FIRST Robotics Competition
- Key Club
- LifeSmarts

== Notable alumni ==
- Ronald Alan Schulz, civilian contract worker who was kidnapped and killed by the Islamic Army in Iraq
- Charles F. Thompson (1899), U.S. Army major general
- Darin Erstad, Major League Baseball player who was a two time all star and World Series champion.
