= Harwood Township, North Dakota =

Township in North Dakota, US

- Township
- Location within North Dakota
- Coordinates: 47°01′15″N 96°52′42″W
- Country: United States
- State: North Dakota
- County: Cass

Area
  - Total: 31.03 sq mi (80.4 km^{2})
  - Land: 31.00 sq mi (80.3 km^{2})
  - Water: 0.026 sq mi (0.067 km^{2})
- Elevation: 873 ft (266 m)

Population (2020)
  - Total: 310
  - Density: 10/sq mi (3.9/km^{2})
- Time zone: UTC-6 (Central (CST))
  - Summer (DST): UTC-5 (CDT)
- ZIP code: 58005 (Argusville); 58042 (Harwood)
- Area code: 701
- FIPS code: 38-35980
- GNIS feature ID: 1036379

Harwood Township is a township in Cass County, North Dakota, United States. The population was 310 at the 2020 census.

The census-designated place of Brooktree Park is located in Harwood Township.

== Geography ==
Harwood Township has a total area of 31.03 square miles (80.4 km^{2}), of which 31.00 square miles (80.3 km^{2}) is land and 0.026 square miles (0.067 km^{2}) is water.

=== Major highways ===
- Interstate 29

== Demographics ==
As of the 2023 American Community Survey, there were an estimated 161 households.
