= Prairie Lake (North Dakota) =

Lake in North Dakota

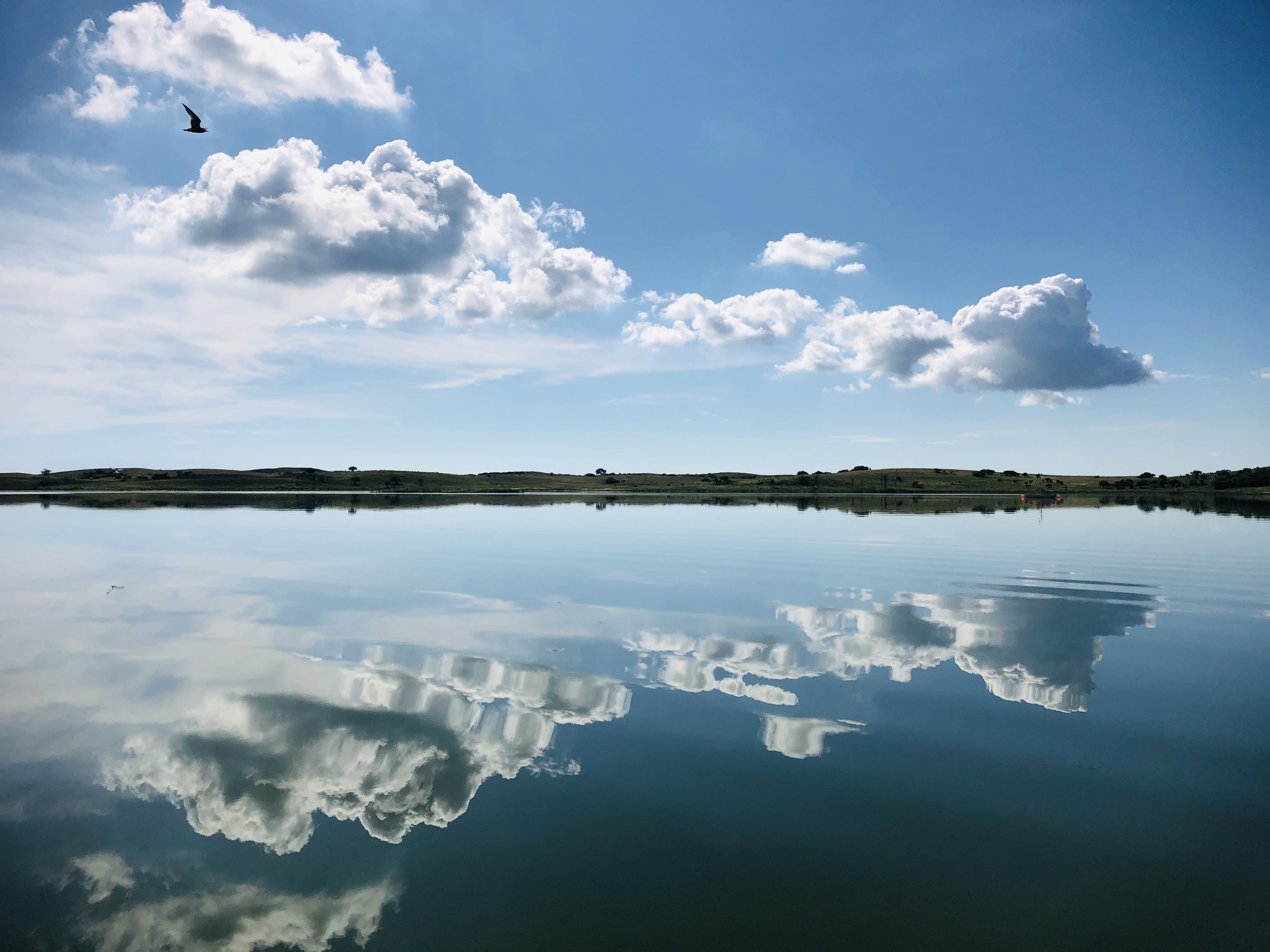
- Prairie Lake, 2020

- Location within North Dakota
- Location: Stutsman County, North Dakota
- Coordinates: 47.15909°N 99.11388°W
- Type: Lake
- Basin countries: United States
- Managing agency: North Dakota Department of Trust Lands
- Surface elevation: 565 m (1,854 ft)

Interactive map of Prairie Lake

Prairie Lake is a terminal wetland lake found in Stutsman County, North Dakota. It is on land that is administered by the North Dakota Department of Trust Lands.

== Characteristics ==
Prairie Lake sits at an elevation of 565 meters. It has a watershed area of 4.5 km^{2}. The substrate of the lake is mostly sandy, with areas of rock cobble and pebbles.

The lake seasonally experiences low-water levels. It has a relatively low water clarity.

=== Ecology ===
The banks of the lake are peaty, and sedges are common. Plants such as Poa pratensis, Elaeagnus commutata, and Crataegus chrysocarpa are found ubiquitously around the lake.

== Data collection ==
The lake is home to two meteorological stations, one of which is situated on a buoy. Biological surveying is performed through electrofishing and sampling for zooplankton and macroinvertebrates.

== See also ==
- Prairie Pothole, another lake in Stutsman County where ecological research is conducted
