= Ronald Alan Schulz =

- Born: March 29, 1965; Jamestown, North Dakota, U.S.
- Died: c. December 8, 2005 (aged 40); Iraq
- Cause of death: Shot in the back of the head

Ronald Alan Schulz (March 29, 1965 – circa December 8, 2005) was an American civilian contract worker in Iraq who was kidnapped and killed by Iraqi insurgents.

== Early life ==
Schulz graduated from Jamestown High School in Jamestown, North Dakota in 1983. He joined the United States Marine Corps and served from 1984 to 1991. After leaving the Marines, Schulz moved to Alaska.

== Death in Iraq ==
In 2005, Schulz went to Iraq as a civilian contract worker initially doing electrical work for KBR (Kellog Brown & Root). He had left them to do electrical work for an unspecified private security organization. On or around November 25, 2005, Schulz was kidnapped by unknown insurgents, although the U.S. government did not announce the kidnapping until December 6.

On December 6, 2005, the Islamic Army in Iraq uploaded a video to the internet showing Schulz sitting in a white plastic chair with his hands tied behind his back. The group threatened to kill him in 48 hours unless the U.S. government freed all Iraqi prisoners and paid compensation to Iraqis affected by military offensives led by U.S. troops against militants in the Sunni Muslim-dominated Al Anbar province. On December 8, 2005, the group declared that they had killed Schulz after the U.S. refused to give in to their demands.

On December 19, 2005, the militants uploaded a video showing Schulz's death, in which he is shot in the back of the head with an automatic rifle. The video included footage of Schulz's identification card. Schulz's remains were found in a grave in Iraq in September 2008 along with those of Susan Bushra, his Kurdish fiancée. The remains were confirmed to be Schulz's in October and they were returned to North Dakota for burial.

== See also ==
- Foreign hostages in Iraq
- List of kidnappings
