= Prairie Pothole (lake) =

Lake in North Dakota

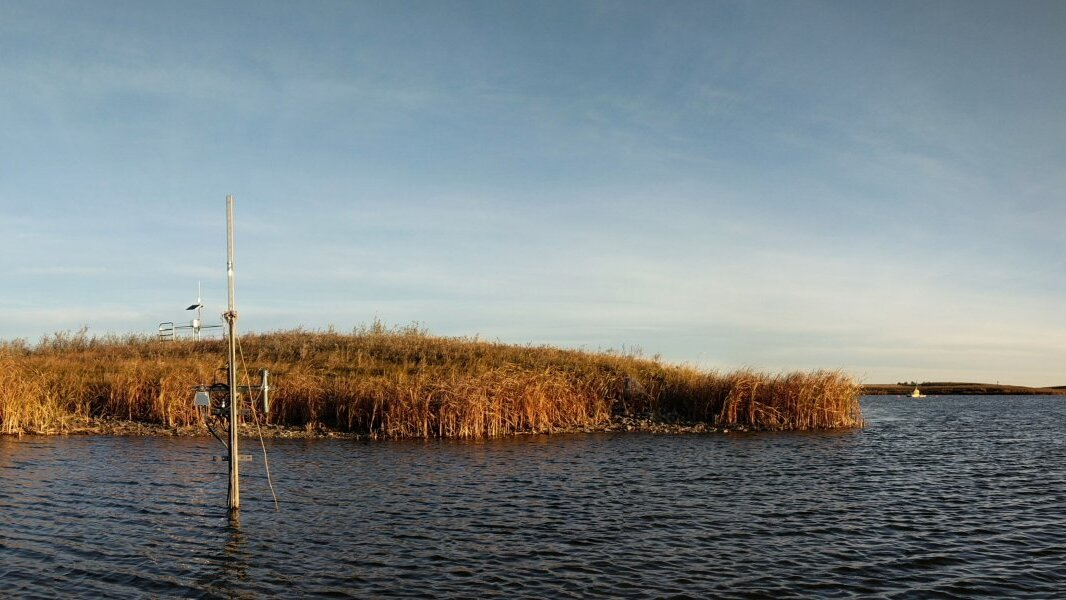
- Monitoring equipment at Prairie Pothole

- Location within North Dakota
- Location: Stutsman County, North Dakota
- Coordinates: 47.129839°N 99.253147°W
- Type: Lake
- Basin countries: United States
- Managing agency: U.S Geological Survey and U.S. Fish and Wildlife Service
- Surface elevation: 579 metres (1,900 ft)

Interactive map of Prairie Pothole

Prairie Pothole is a year-long depressional freshwater wetland lake found in Stutsman County, North Dakota. It is on land that is administered by the USGS and USFWS. The watershed is managed as part of the Chase Lake National Wildlife Refuge.

== Characteristics ==
The lake has a watershed of 1.4 square kilometres (0.54 sq mi). It is filled by precipitation in the form of rain and snowmelt during spring and summer. The lake is considered a terminal wetland, as there are no outflows. The geology of the lake is glacial mud, clay, and silt. Soils are typically mollisols.

Reeds and cattails grow in the riparian area around the lake. It has a relatively low water clarity.

== Data collection ==
Ecological monitoring has been conducted at the lake since 2014. It is representative of the greater Prairie Pothole Region.

The lake is home to two meteorological stations, one of which is situated on a buoy. Biological surveying is performed through electrofishing and sampling for zooplankton and macroinvertebrates. Water chemistry is also sampled.

== See also ==
- Prairie Lake, another lake in Stutsman County where ecological research is conducted
