= Springbrook, North Dakota =

Springbrook
- City
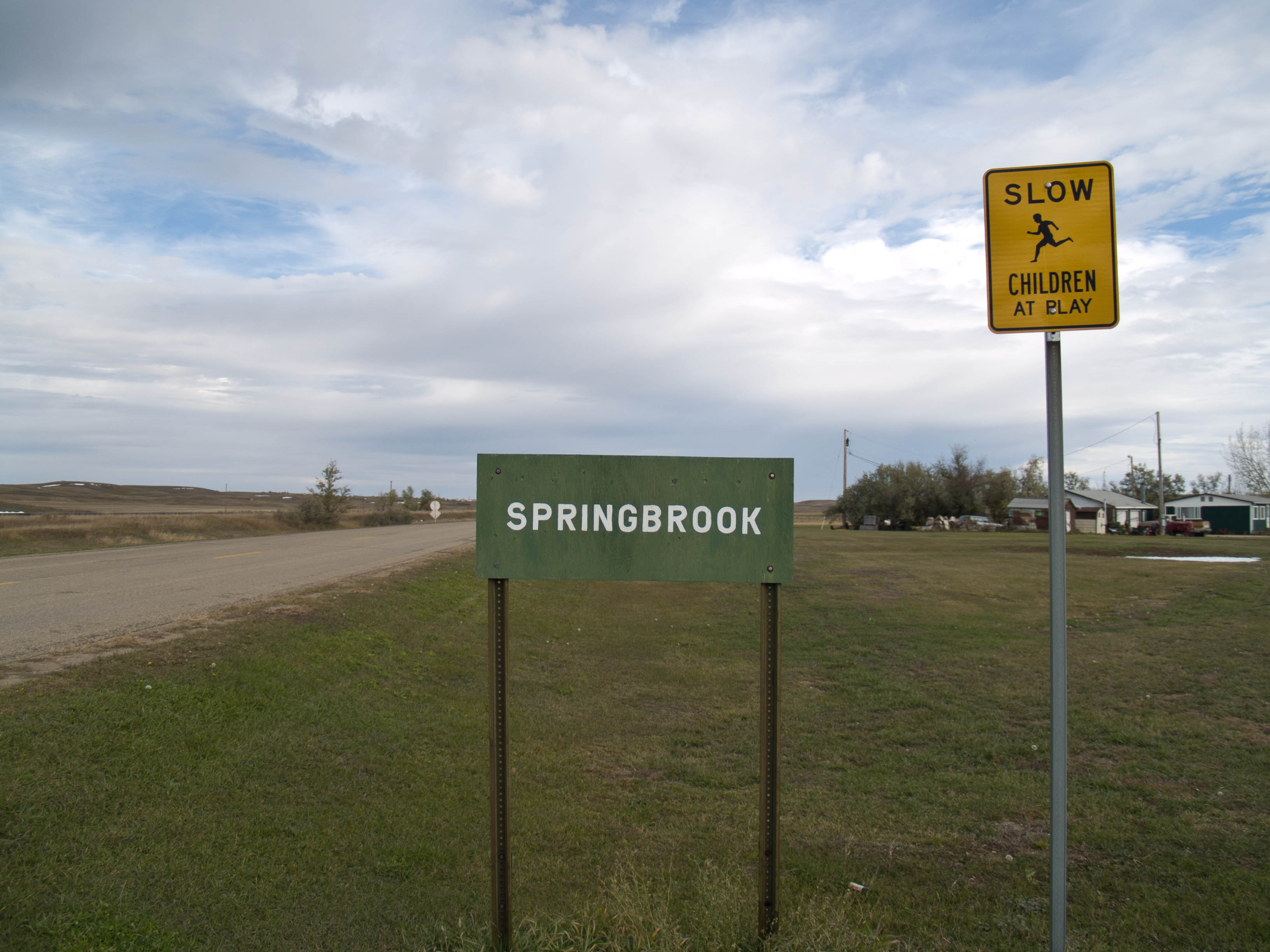
- Sign in Springbrook

- Location of Springbrook, North Dakota
- Coordinates: 48°15′07″N 103°27′42″W
- Country: United States
- State: North Dakota
- County: Williams
- Founded: 1903

Area
  - Total: 0.37 sq mi (0.97 km^{2})
  - Land: 0.37 sq mi (0.97 km^{2})
  - Water: 0 sq mi (0.00 km^{2})
- Elevation: 2,070 ft (630 m)

Population (2020)
  - Total: 37
  - Estimate (2022): 30
  - Density: 99.1/sq mi (38.26/km^{2})
- Time zone: UTC–6 (Central (CST))
  - Summer (DST): UTC–5 (CDT)
- ZIP Code: 58843
- Area code: 701
- FIPS code: 38-74780
- GNIS feature ID: 1036283

Springbrook is a city in Williams County, North Dakota, United States. The population was 37 at the 2020 census. It is also spelled Spring Brook.

== Geography ==
According to the United States Census Bureau, the city has a total area of 0.37 square miles (0.96 km^{2}), all land.

== Demographics ==
Historical population
Census	Pop.	Note	%±
1920	93		—
1930	105		12.9%
1940	77		−26.7%
1950	51		−33.8%
1960	35		−31.4%
1970	27		−22.9%
1980	52		92.6%
1990	29		−44.2%
2000	26		−10.3%
2010	27		3.8%
2020	37		37.0%
2022 (est.)	30		−18.9%
U.S. Decennial Census; 2020 Census

=== 2010 census ===
As of the census of 2010, there were 27 people, 11 households, and 6 families residing in the city. The population density was 73.0 inhabitants per square mile (28.2/km^{2}). There were 14 housing units at an average density of 37.8 per square mile (14.6/km^{2}). The racial makeup of the city was 100.0% White.

There were 11 households, of which 45.5% had children under the age of 18 living with them, 36.4% were married couples living together, 9.1% had a female householder with no husband present, 9.1% had a male householder with no wife present, and 45.5% were non-families. 18.2% of all households were made up of individuals, and 9.1% had someone living alone who was 65 years of age or older. The average household size was 2.45 and the average family size was 3.17.

The median age in the city was 41.3 years. 29.6% of residents were under the age of 18; 3.7% were between the ages of 18 and 24; 22.2% were from 25 to 44; 40.7% were from 45 to 64; and 3.7% were 65 years of age or older. The gender makeup of the city was 37.0% male and 63.0% female.

=== 2000 census ===
As of the census of 2000, there were 26 people, 14 households, and 7 families residing in the city. The population density was 70.4 inhabitants per square mile (27.2/km^{2}). There were 20 housing units at an average density of 54.2 per square mile (20.9/km^{2}). The racial makeup of the city was 100.00% White. Hispanic or Latino of any race were 15.38% of the population.

There were 14 households, out of which 14.3% had children under the age of 18 living with them, 50.0% were married couples living together, and 50.0% were non-families. 50.0% of all households were made up of individuals, and 21.4% had someone living alone who was 65 years of age or older. The average household size was 1.86 and the average family size was 2.71.

In the city, the population was spread out, with 15.4% under the age of 18, 15.4% from 18 to 24, 15.4% from 25 to 44, 26.9% from 45 to 64, and 26.9% who were 65 years of age or older. The median age was 46 years. For every 100 females, there were 116.7 males. For every 100 females age 18 and over, there were 120.0 males.

The median income for a household in the city was $35,938, and the median income for a family was $53,125. Males had a median income of $31,250 versus $23,750 for females. The per capita income for the city was $17,142. There were 22.2% of families and 38.5% of the population living below the poverty line, including 100.0% of under eighteens and none of those over 64.

== Climate ==
According to the Köppen Climate Classification system, Springbrook has a semi-arid climate, abbreviated "BSk" on climate maps.

== Transportation ==
Amtrak's Empire Builder, which operates between Seattle/Portland and Chicago, passes through the town on BNSF tracks, but makes no stop. The nearest station is located in Williston, 13 miles (21 km) to the southwest.

== Education ==
It is within the Nesson School District (Ray Public School).
