= Buchanan, North Dakota =

- City
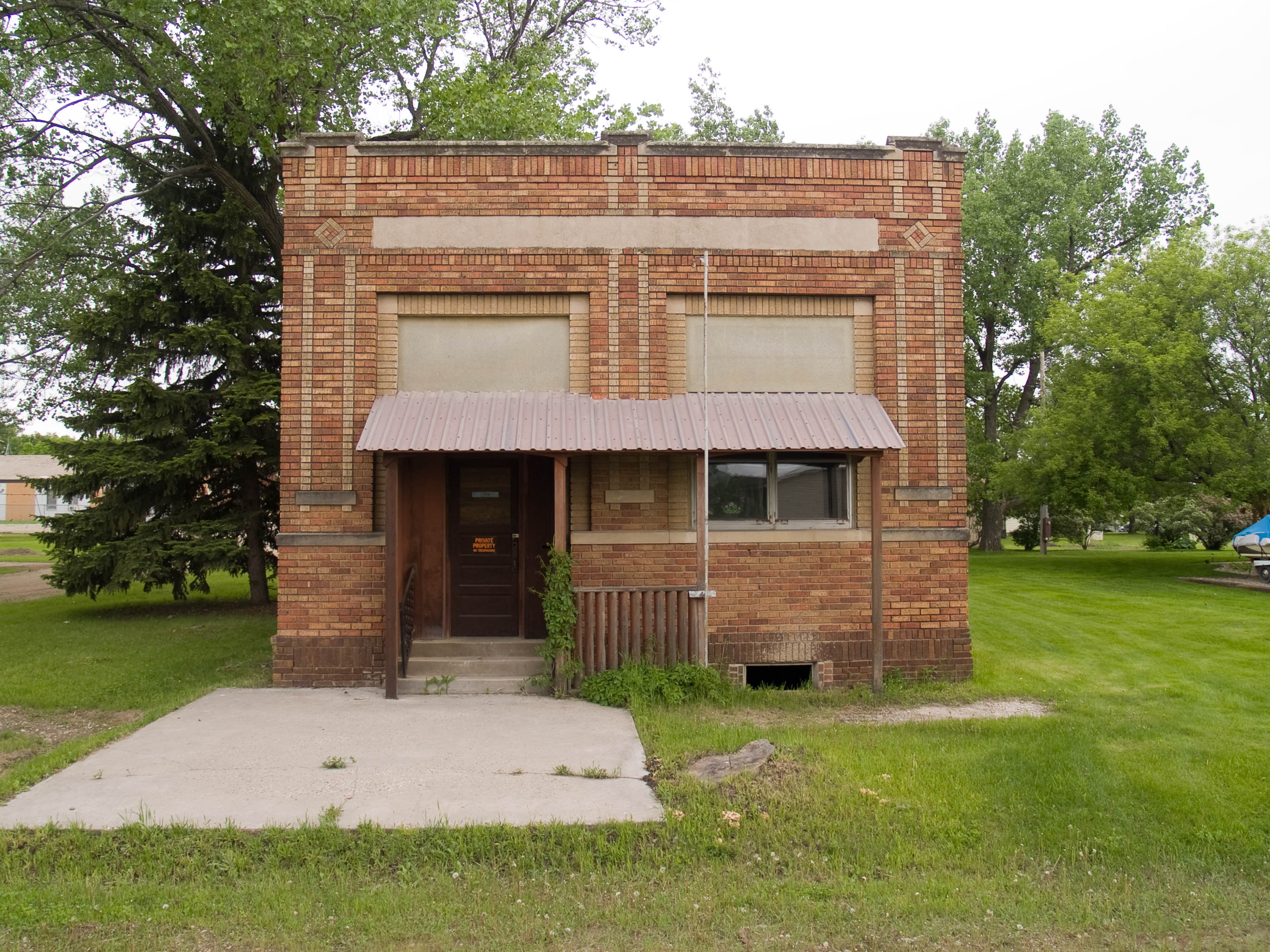
- Building in Buchanan

- Location of Buchanan, North Dakota
- Coordinates: 47°03′45″N 98°49′44″W
- Country: United States
- State: North Dakota
- County: Stutsman
- Founded: 1887

Area
  - Total: 0.077 sq mi (0.20 km^{2})
  - Land: 0.077 sq mi (0.20 km^{2})
  - Water: 0 sq mi (0.00 km^{2})
- Elevation: 1,555 ft (474 m)

Population (2020)
  - Total: 87
  - Estimate (2022): 86
  - Density: 1,142.5/sq mi (441.13/km^{2})
- Time zone: UTC-6 (Central (CST))
  - Summer (DST): UTC-5 (CDT)
- ZIP code: 58420
- Area code: 701
- FIPS code: 38-10060
- GNIS feature ID: 1035944

Buchanan is a city in Stutsman County, North Dakota, United States. The population was 87 at the 2020 census. Buchanan was founded in 1887.

Buchanan was once home to Henry Leuhr's Giant Bull, inspired by the World's Largest Buffalo in Jamestown, North Dakota, which stood 30 feet (9.1 m) tall and was 50 feet (15 m) long until it deteriorated and was removed from its site in January 2007.

== History ==
A post office called Buchanan has been in operation since 1894. The city's name honors James A. Buchanan, a local pioneer.

== Geography ==
According to the United States Census Bureau, the city has a total area of 0.08 square miles (0.21 km^{2}), all land.

== Demographics ==
Historical population
Census	Pop.	Note	%±
1990	40		—
2000	77		92.5%
2010	90		16.9%
2020	87		−3.3%
2022 (est.)	86		−1.1%
U.S. Decennial Census; 2020 Census

=== 2010 census ===
As of the census of 2010, there were 90 people, 32 households, and 24 families residing in the city. The population density was 1,125.0 inhabitants per square mile (434.4/km^{2}). There were 34 housing units at an average density of 425.0 per square mile (164.1/km^{2}). The racial makeup of the city was 100.0% White.

There were 32 households, of which 50.0% had children under the age of 18 living with them, 56.3% were married couples living together, 15.6% had a female householder with no husband present, 3.1% had a male householder with no wife present, and 25.0% were non-families. 18.8% of all households were made up of individuals, and 6.2% had someone living alone who was 65 years of age or older. The average household size was 2.81 and the average family size was 3.17.

The median age in the city was 31.3 years. 32.2% of residents were under the age of 18; 10.1% were between the ages of 18 and 24; 26.8% were from 25 to 44; 25.6% were from 45 to 64; and 5.6% were 65 years of age or older. The gender makeup of the city was 54.4% male and 45.6% female.

=== 2000 census ===
As of the census of 2000, there were 77 people, 27 households, and 19 families residing in the city. The population density was 980.9 inhabitants per square mile (378.7/km^{2}). There were 29 housing units at an average density of 369.4 per square mile (142.6/km^{2}). The racial makeup of the city was 100.00% White.

There were 27 households, out of which 40.7% had children under the age of 18 living with them, 66.7% were married couples living together, 3.7% had a female householder with no husband present, and 29.6% were non-families. 22.2% of all households were made up of individuals, and 11.1% had someone living alone who was 65 years of age or older. The average household size was 2.85 and the average family size was 3.47.

In the city, the population was spread out, with 31.2% under the age of 18, 6.5% from 18 to 24, 41.6% from 25 to 44, 10.4% from 45 to 64, and 10.4% who were 65 years of age or older. The median age was 34 years. For every 100 females, there were 120.0 males. For every 100 females age 18 and over, there were 112.0 males.

The median income for a household in the city was $53,333, and the median income for a family was $60,000. Males had a median income of $32,292 versus $23,750 for females. The per capita income for the city was $18,024. There were no families and 1.2% of the population living below the poverty line, including no one under 18 and 20.0% of those over 64.
