= Brooktree Park, North Dakota =

- Census-designated place
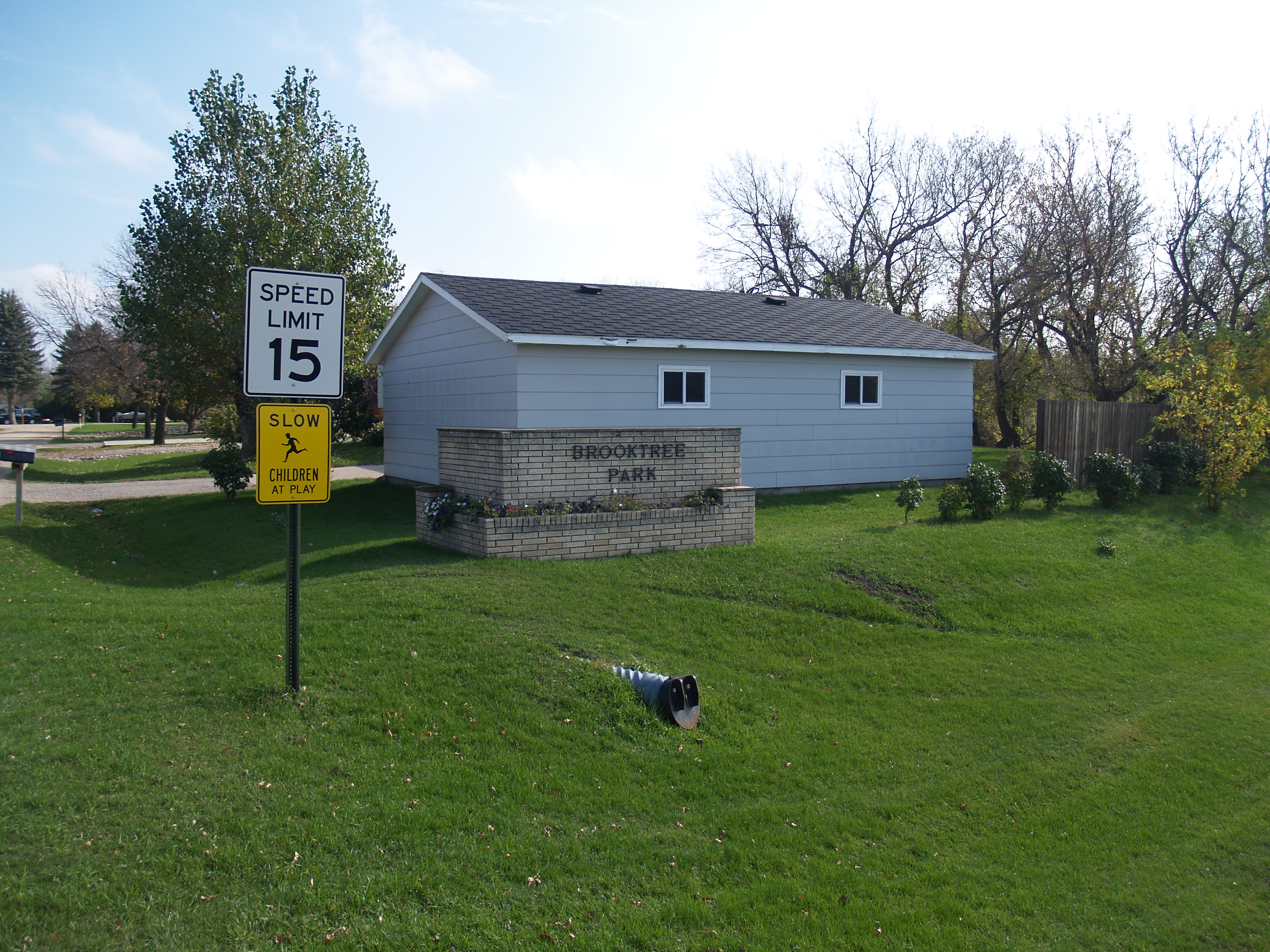
- Sign at the entrance to Brooktree Park

- Location within North Dakota
- Coordinates: 47°00′14″N 96°53′45″W
- Country: United States
- State: North Dakota
- County: Cass
- Township: Harwood

Area
  - Total: 0.18 sq mi (0.46 km^{2})
  - Land: 0.18 sq mi (0.46 km^{2})
  - Water: 0 sq mi (0.00 km^{2})
- Elevation: 886 ft (270 m)

Population (2020)
  - Total: 76
  - Density: 432.2/sq mi (166.89/km^{2})
- Time zone: UTC-6 (Central (CST))
  - Summer (DST): UTC-5 (CDT)
- ZIP code: 58042 (Harwood)
- Area code: 701
- GNIS feature ID: 2585496

Brooktree Park is a census-designated place and unincorporated community in Harwood Township, Cass County, North Dakota, United States. Its population was 76 as of the 2020 census.

== Demographics ==
Historical population
Census	Pop.	Note	%±
2020	76		—
U.S. Decennial Census
