= Woodworth, North Dakota =

Woodworth
- City
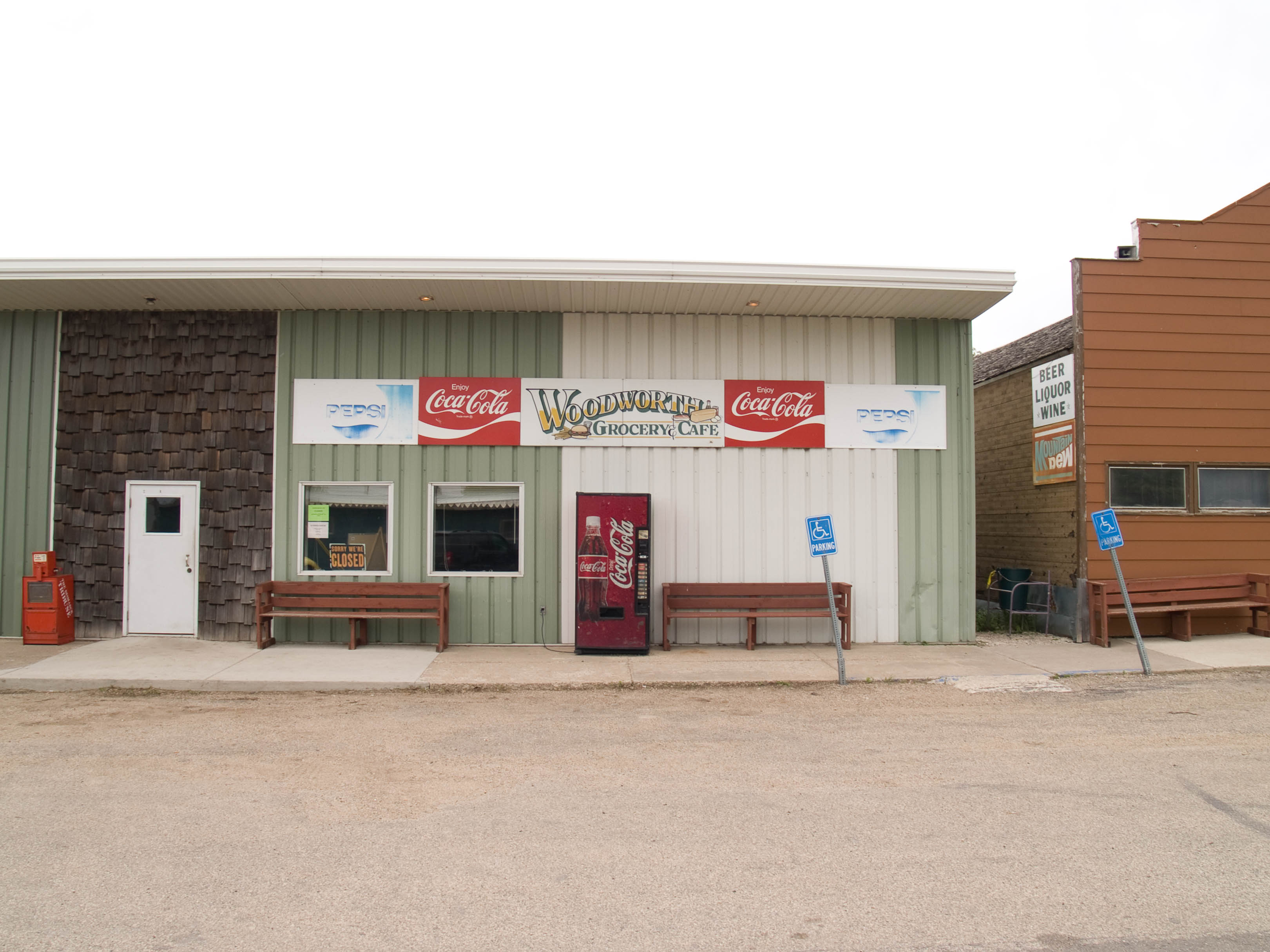
- Woodworth Grocery

- Location of Woodworth, North Dakota
- Coordinates: 47°08′32″N 99°18′15″W
- Country: United States
- State: North Dakota
- County: Stutsman
- Founded: 1911

Area
  - Total: 0.22 sq mi (0.56 km^{2})
  - Land: 0.21 sq mi (0.55 km^{2})
  - Water: 0.0039 sq mi (0.01 km^{2})
- Elevation: 2,031 ft (619 m)

Population (2020)
  - Total: 44
  - Estimate (2022): 44
  - Density: 206.6/sq mi (79.75/km^{2})
- Time zone: UTC–6 (Central (CST))
  - Summer (DST): UTC–5 (CDT)
- ZIP Code: 58496
- Area code: 701
- FIPS code: 38-87580
- GNIS feature ID: 1036342

Woodworth is a city in Stutsman County, North Dakota, United States. The population was 44 at the 2020 census. The small town has a Cafe,a bar by the name of the back 4T, a post office,and 2 Lutheran church's.

== History ==
Woodworth was founded in 1911. It was named for J.G. Woodworth, a railroad official.

== Geography ==
According to the United States Census Bureau, the city has a total area of 0.22 square miles (0.57 km^{2}), all land.

== Demographics ==
Historical population
Census	Pop.	Note	%±
1920	297		—
1930	261		−12.1%
1940	203		−22.2%
1950	238		17.2%
1960	218		−8.4%
1970	139		−36.2%
1980	137		−1.4%
1990	102		−25.5%
2000	80		−21.6%
2010	50		−37.5%
2020	44		−12.0%
2022 (est.)	44		0.0%
U.S. Decennial Census; 2020 Census

=== 2010 census ===
As of the census of 2010, there were 50 people, 33 households, and 11 families residing in the city. The population density was 227.3 inhabitants per square mile (87.8/km^{2}). There were 52 housing units at an average density of 236.4 per square mile (91.3/km^{2}). The racial makeup of the city was 92.0% White and 8.0% Native American.

There were 33 households, of which 18.2% had children under the age of 18 living with them, 24.2% were married couples living together, 6.1% had a female householder with no husband present, 3.0% had a male householder with no wife present, and 66.7% were non-families. 66.7% of all households were made up of individuals, and 21.2% had someone living alone who was 65 years of age or older. The average household size was 1.52 and the average family size was 2.45.

The median age in the city was 56.5 years. 16% of residents were under the age of 18; 2% were between the ages of 18 and 24; 20% were from 25 to 44; 40% were from 45 to 64; and 22% were 65 years of age or older. The gender makeup of the city was 56.0% male and 44.0% female.

=== 2000 census ===
As of the census of 2000, there were 80 people, 37 households, and 24 families residing in the city. The population density was 368.4 inhabitants per square mile (142.2/km^{2}). There were 56 housing units at an average density of 257.9 per square mile (99.6/km^{2}). The racial makeup of the city was 100.00% White.

There were 37 households, out of which 21.6% had children under the age of 18 living with them, 59.5% were married couples living together, 2.7% had a female householder with no husband present, and 35.1% were non-families. 35.1% of all households were made up of individuals, and 13.5% had someone living alone who was 65 years of age or older. The average household size was 2.16 and the average family size was 2.79.

In the city, the population was spread out, with 21.3% under the age of 18, 8.8% from 18 to 24, 20.0% from 25 to 44, 27.5% from 45 to 64, and 22.5% who were 65 years of age or older. The median age was 45 years. For every 100 females, there were 116.2 males. For every 100 females age 18 and over, there were 103.2 males.

The median income for a household in the city was $36,250, and the median income for a family was $65,357. Males had a median income of $32,917 versus $17,188 for females. The per capita income for the city was $16,695. There were 4.2% of families and 11.3% of the population living below the poverty line, including 20.0% of under eighteens and 8.7% of those over 64.

== Climate ==
This climatic region is typified by large seasonal temperature differences, with warm to hot (and often humid) summers and cold (sometimes severely cold) winters. According to the Köppen Climate Classification system, Woodworth has a humid continental climate, abbreviated "Dfb" on climate maps.
