= Cleveland, North Dakota =

- City
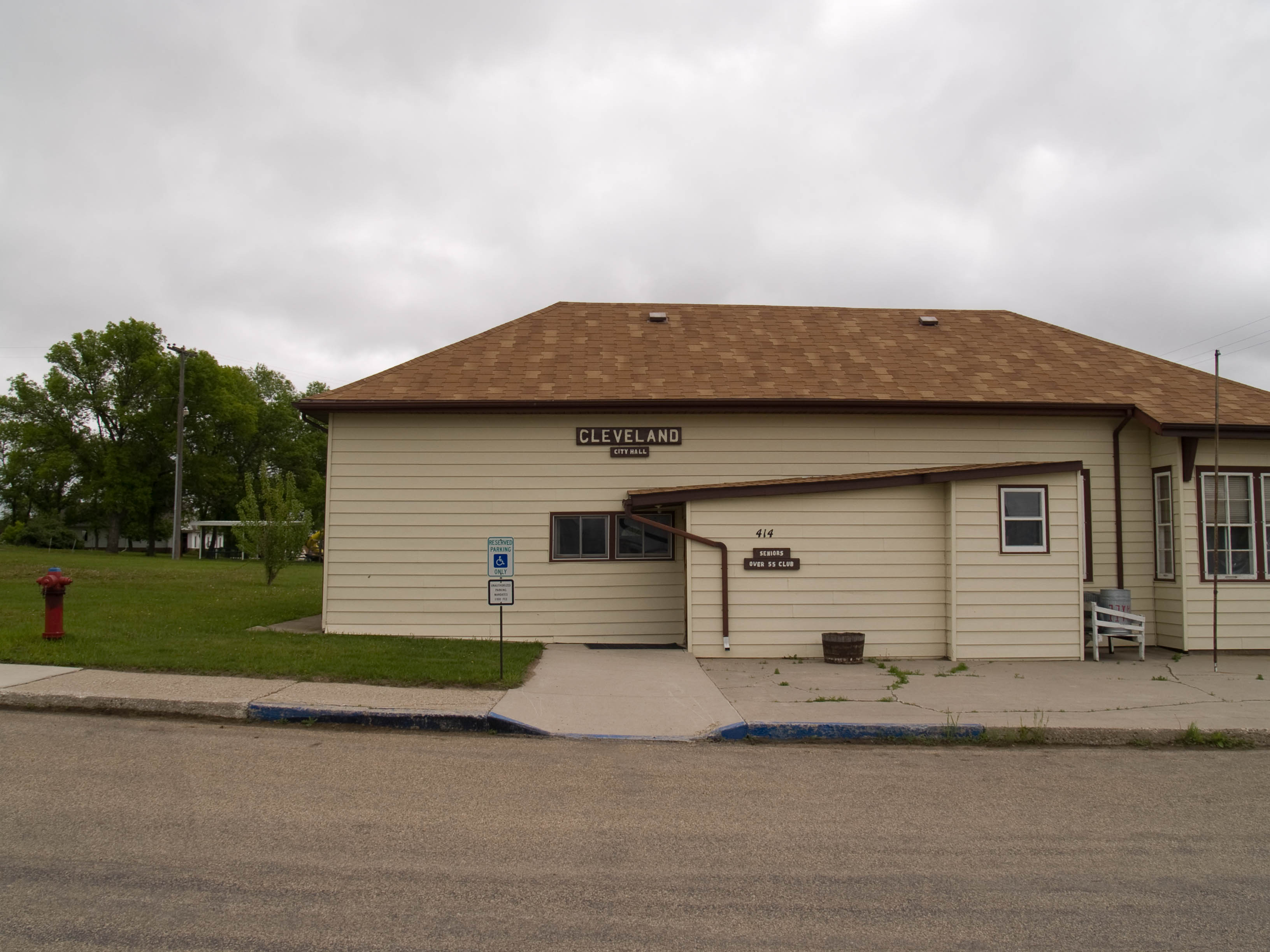
- City Hall in Cleveland

- Location of Cleveland, North Dakota
- Coordinates: 46°53′27″N 99°07′10″W
- Country: United States
- State: North Dakota
- County: Stutsman
- Founded: 1882

Area
  - Total: 0.21 sq mi (0.55 km^{2})
  - Land: 0.21 sq mi (0.55 km^{2})
  - Water: 0 sq mi (0.00 km^{2})
- Elevation: 1,873 ft (571 m)

Population (2020)
  - Total: 57
  - Estimate (2022): 60
  - Density: 269.2/sq mi (103.95/km^{2})
- Time zone: UTC-6 (Central (CST))
  - Summer (DST): UTC-5 (CDT)
- ZIP code: 58424
- Area code: 701
- FIPS code: 38-14660
- GNIS feature ID: 1035971

Cleveland is a city in Stutsman County, North Dakota, United States. The population was 57 at the 2020 census.

== History ==
Cleveland was founded in 1882. It was named for Cleveland, Ohio. A post office has been in operation at Cleveland since 1882.

== Geography ==
According to the United States Census Bureau, the city has a total area of 0.18 square miles (0.47 km^{2}), all land.

== Demographics ==
Historical population
Census	Pop.	Note	%±
1920	341		—
1930	273		−19.9%
1940	246		−9.9%
1950	181		−26.4%
1960	169		−6.6%
1970	128		−24.3%
1980	130		1.6%
1990	121		−6.9%
2000	112		−7.4%
2010	83		−25.9%
2020	57		−31.3%
2022 (est.)	60		5.3%
U.S. Decennial Census; 2020 Census

=== 2010 census ===
As of the census of 2010, there were 83 people in 40 households, including 21 families, in the city. The population density was 461.1 inhabitants per square mile (178.0/km^{2}). There were 54 housing units at an average density of 300.0 per square mile (115.8/km^{2}). The racial makup of the city was 100.0% White.

Of the 40 households 20.0% had children under the age of 18 living with them, 47.5% were married couples living together, 5.0% had a male householder with no wife present, and 47.5% were non-families. 42.5% of households were one person and 15% were one person aged 65 or older. The average household size was 2.08 and the average family size was 2.90.

The median age was 44.5 years. 21.7% of residents were under the age of 18; 2.3% were between the ages of 18 and 24; 26.4% were from 25 to 44; 27.6% were from 45 to 64; and 21.7% were 65 or older. The gender makeup of the city was 56.6% male and 43.4% female.

=== 2000 census ===
As of the census of 2000, there were 112 people in 52 households, including 34 families, in the city. The population density was 617.5 inhabitants per square mile (238.4/km^{2}). There were 59 housing units at an average density of 325.3 per square mile (125.6/km^{2}). The racial makup of the city was 99.11% White and 0.89% Native American.

Of the 52 households 26.9% had children under the age of 18 living with them, 50.0% were married couples living together, 7.7% had a female householder with no husband present, and 34.6% were non-families. 34.6% of households were one person and 13.5% were one person aged 65 or older. The average household size was 2.15 and the average family size was 2.68.

The age distribution was 25.9% under the age of 18, 4.5% from 18 to 24, 20.5% from 25 to 44, 32.1% from 45 to 64, and 17.0% 65 or older. The median age was 42 years. For every 100 females, there were 100.0 males. For every 100 females age 18 and over, there were 97.6 males.

The median household income was $25,179 and the median family income was $26,750. Males had a median income of $27,500 versus $26,875 for females. The per capita income for the city was $13,707. There were 14.3% of families and 15.8% of the population living below the poverty line, including 12.0% of under eighteens and 9.5% of those over 64.
