= Montpelier, North Dakota =

- City
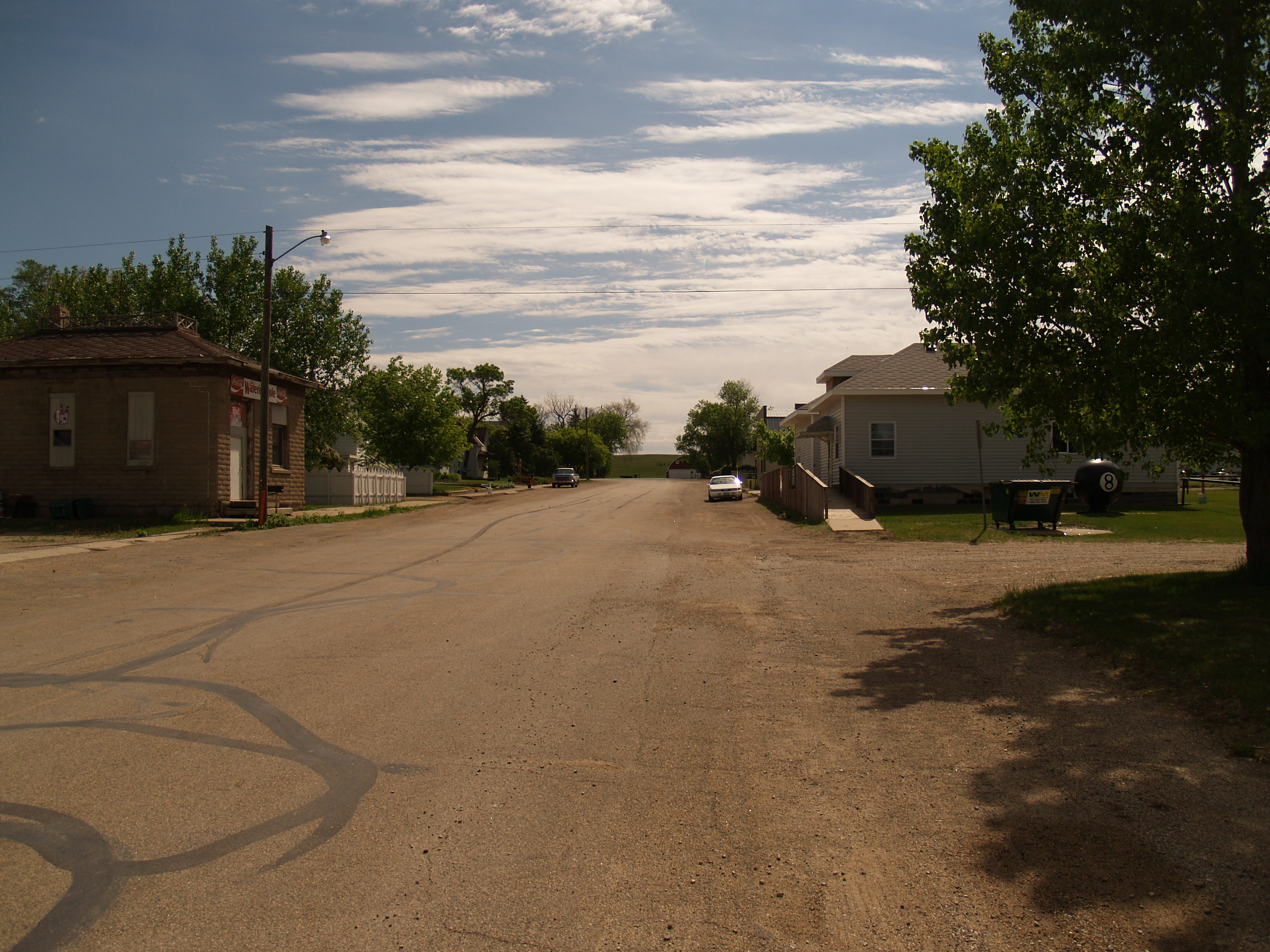
- Business district of Montpelier

- Location of Montpelier, North Dakota
- Coordinates: 46°41′56″N 98°35′18″W
- Country: United States
- State: North Dakota
- County: Stutsman
- Founded: 1885

Area
  - Total: 0.15 sq mi (0.40 km^{2})
  - Land: 0.15 sq mi (0.40 km^{2})
  - Water: 0 sq mi (0.00 km^{2})
- Elevation: 1,375 ft (419 m)

Population (2020)
  - Total: 85
  - Estimate (2022): 86
  - Density: 556.3/sq mi (214.77/km^{2})
- Time zone: UTC-6 (Central (CST))
  - Summer (DST): UTC-5 (CDT)
- ZIP code: 58472
- Area code: 701
- FIPS code: 38-53980
- GNIS feature ID: 1036169

Montpelier is a city in Stutsman County, North Dakota, United States. The population was 85 at the 2020 census. Montpelier was founded in 1885.

== Geography ==
According to the United States Census Bureau, the city has a total area of 0.18 square miles (0.47 km^{2}), all land.

== Demographics ==
Historical population
Census	Pop.	Note	%±
1920	186		—
1930	165		−11.3%
1940	133		−19.4%
1950	105		−21.1%
1960	97		−7.6%
1970	116		19.6%
1980	96		−17.2%
1990	82		−14.6%
2000	103		25.6%
2010	87		−15.5%
2020	85		−2.3%
2022 (est.)	86		1.2%
U.S. Decennial Census; 2020 Census

=== 2010 census ===
As of the census of 2010, there were 87 people, 39 households, and 28 families residing in the city. The population density was 483.3 inhabitants per square mile (186.6/km^{2}). There were 46 housing units at an average density of 255.6 per square mile (98.7/km^{2}). The racial makeup of the city was 100.0% White.

There were 39 households, of which 25.6% had children under the age of 18 living with them, 59.0% were married couples living together, 10.3% had a female householder with no husband present, 2.6% had a male householder with no wife present, and 28.2% were non-families. 25.6% of all households were made up of individuals, and 5.2% had someone living alone who was 65 years of age or older. The average household size was 2.23 and the average family size was 2.64.

The median age in the city was 44.8 years. 21.8% of residents were under the age of 18; 5.7% were between the ages of 18 and 24; 22.9% were from 25 to 44; 31% were from 45 to 64; and 18.4% were 65 years of age or older. The gender makeup of the city was 50.6% male and 49.4% female.

=== 2000 census ===
As of the census of 2000, there were 103 people, 44 households, and 31 families residing in the town. The population density was 385.9 inhabitants per square mile (149.0/km^{2}). There were 45 housing units at an average density of 168.6 per square mile (65.1/km^{2}). The racial makeup of the town was 99.03% White and 0.97% African American.

There were 44 households, out of which 29.5% had children under the age of 18 living with them, 54.5% were married couples living together, 13.6% had a female householder with no husband present, and 29.5% were non-families. 22.7% of all households were made up of individuals, and 9.1% had someone living alone who was 65 years of age or older. The average household size was 2.34 and the average family size was 2.77.

In the town the population was spread out, with 23.3% under the age of 18, 4.9% from 18 to 24, 28.2% from 25 to 44, 31.1% from 45 to 64, and 12.6% who were 65 years of age or older. The median age was 42 years. For every 100 females, there were 119.1 males. For every 100 females age 18 and over, there were 107.9 males.

The median income for a household in the town was $26,250, and the median income for a family was $36,250. Males had a median income of $22,083 versus $20,500 for females. The per capita income for the town was $15,619. There were no families and 6.0% of the population living below the poverty line, including no under eighteens and 17.4% of those over 64.

== Climate ==
This climatic region is typified by large seasonal temperature differences, with warm to hot (and often humid) summers and cold (sometimes severely cold) winters. According to the Köppen Climate Classification system, Montpelier has a humid continental climate, abbreviated "Dfb" on climate maps.
