= Spiritwood Lake, North Dakota =

Spiritwood Lake
- City
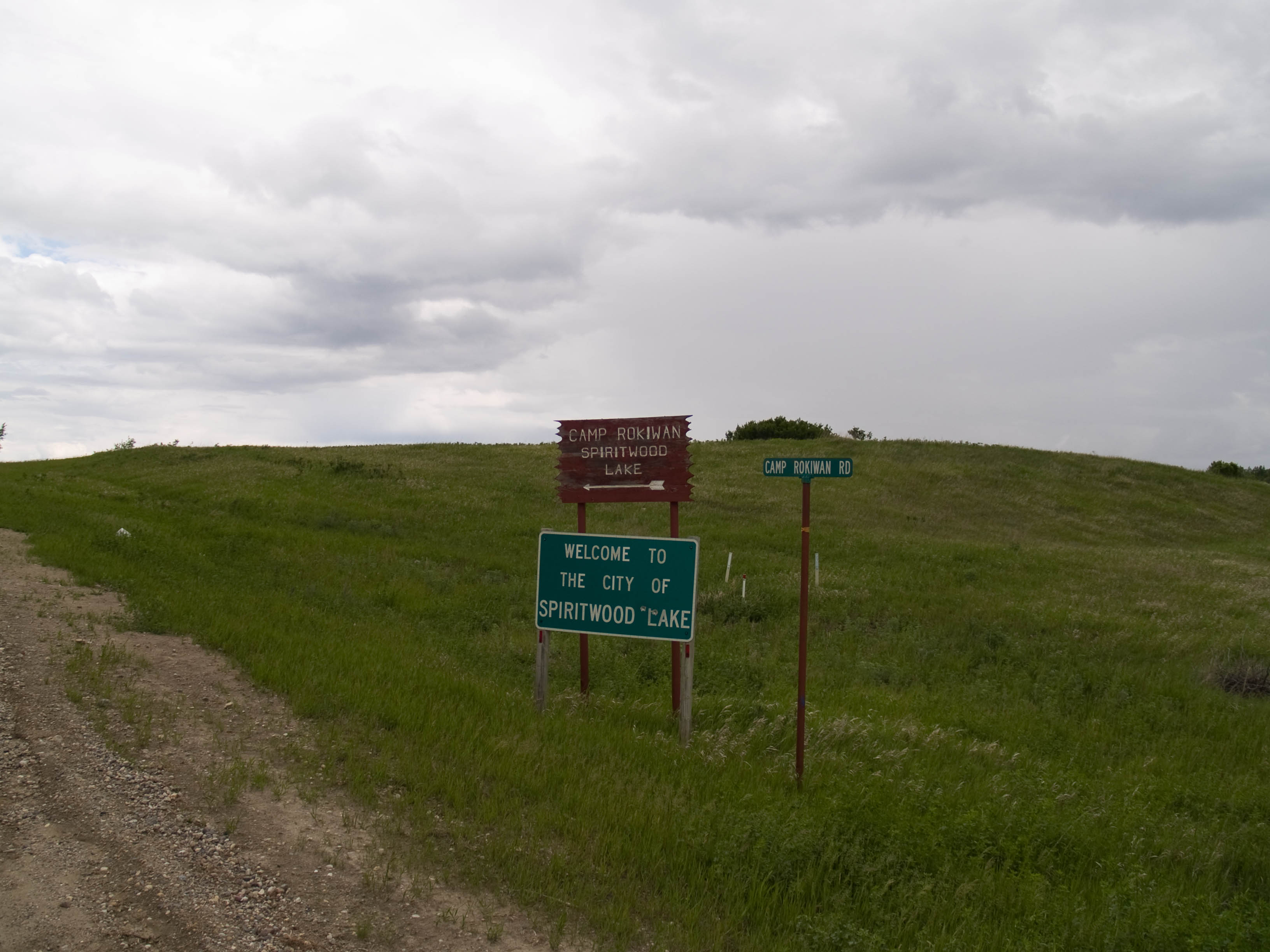
- Sign in Spiritwood Lake

- Location of Spiritwood Lake, North Dakota
- Coordinates: 47°04′28″N 98°35′12″W
- Country: United States
- State: North Dakota
- County: Stutsman
- Founded: 1873
- Incorporated: October 1, 1935

Area
  - Total: 1.86 sq mi (4.83 km^{2})
  - Land: 1.14 sq mi (2.96 km^{2})
  - Water: 0.72 sq mi (1.87 km^{2})
- Elevation: 1,434 ft (437 m)

Population (2020)
  - Total: 97
  - Estimate (2022): 92
  - Density: 85.0/sq mi (32.82/km^{2})
- Time zone: UTC-6 (Central (CST))
  - Summer (DST): UTC-5 (CDT)
- ZIP code: 58401
- Area code: 701
- FIPS code: 38-74740
- GNIS feature ID: 1036282

Spiritwood Lake is a city in Stutsman County, North Dakota, United States. The population was 97 at the 2020 census.

== Geography ==
According to the United States Census Bureau, the city has a total area of 1.79 square miles (4.64 km^{2}), of which 1.07 square miles (2.77 km^{2}) is land and 0.72 square miles (1.86 km^{2}) is water.

== Demographics ==
Historical population
Census	Pop.	Note	%±
1880	50		—
1980	50		—
1990	61		22.0%
2000	72		18.0%
2010	90		25.0%
2020	97		7.8%
2022 (est.)	92		−5.2%
U.S. Decennial Census; 2020 Census

=== 2010 census ===
As of the census of 2010, there were 90 people, 40 households, and 33 families residing in the city. The population density was 84.1 inhabitants per square mile (32.5/km^{2}). There were 99 housing units at an average density of 92.5 per square mile (35.7/km^{2}). The racial makeup of the city was 100.0% White.

There were 40 households, of which 20.0% had children under the age of 18 living with them, 77.5% were married couples living together, 5.0% had a female householder with no husband present, and 17.5% were non-families. 17.5% of all households were made up of individuals, and 10% had someone living alone who was 65 years of age or older. The average household size was 2.25 and the average family size was 2.48.

The median age in the city was 55.3 years. 12.2% of residents were under the age of 18; 4.4% were between the ages of 18 and 24; 17.7% were from 25 to 44; 37.7% were from 45 to 64; and 27.8% were 65 years of age or older. The gender makeup of the city was 50.0% male and 50.0% female.

=== 2000 census ===
As of the census of 2000, there were 72 people, 31 households, and 23 families residing in the city. The population density was 66.5 inhabitants per square mile (25.7/km^{2}). There were 63 housing units at an average density of 58.2 per square mile (22.5/km^{2}). The racial makeup of the city was 100.00% White.

There were 31 households, out of which 25.8% had children under the age of 18 living with them, 74.2% were married couples living together, 3.2% had a female householder with no husband present, and 22.6% were non-families. 19.4% of all households were made up of individuals, and 6.5% had someone living alone who was 65 years of age or older. The average household size was 2.32 and the average family size was 2.67.

In the city, the population was spread out, with 19.4% under the age of 18, 1.4% from 18 to 24, 25.0% from 25 to 44, 37.5% from 45 to 64, and 16.7% who were 65 years of age or older. The median age was 47 years. For every 100 females, there were 125.0 males. For every 100 females age 18 and over, there were 114.8 males.

The median income for a household in the city was $43,500, and the median income for a family was $45,625. Males had a median income of $22,500 versus $14,375 for females. The per capita income for the city was $24,637. None of the population and none of the families were below the poverty line.
