= Oriska, North Dakota =

- City
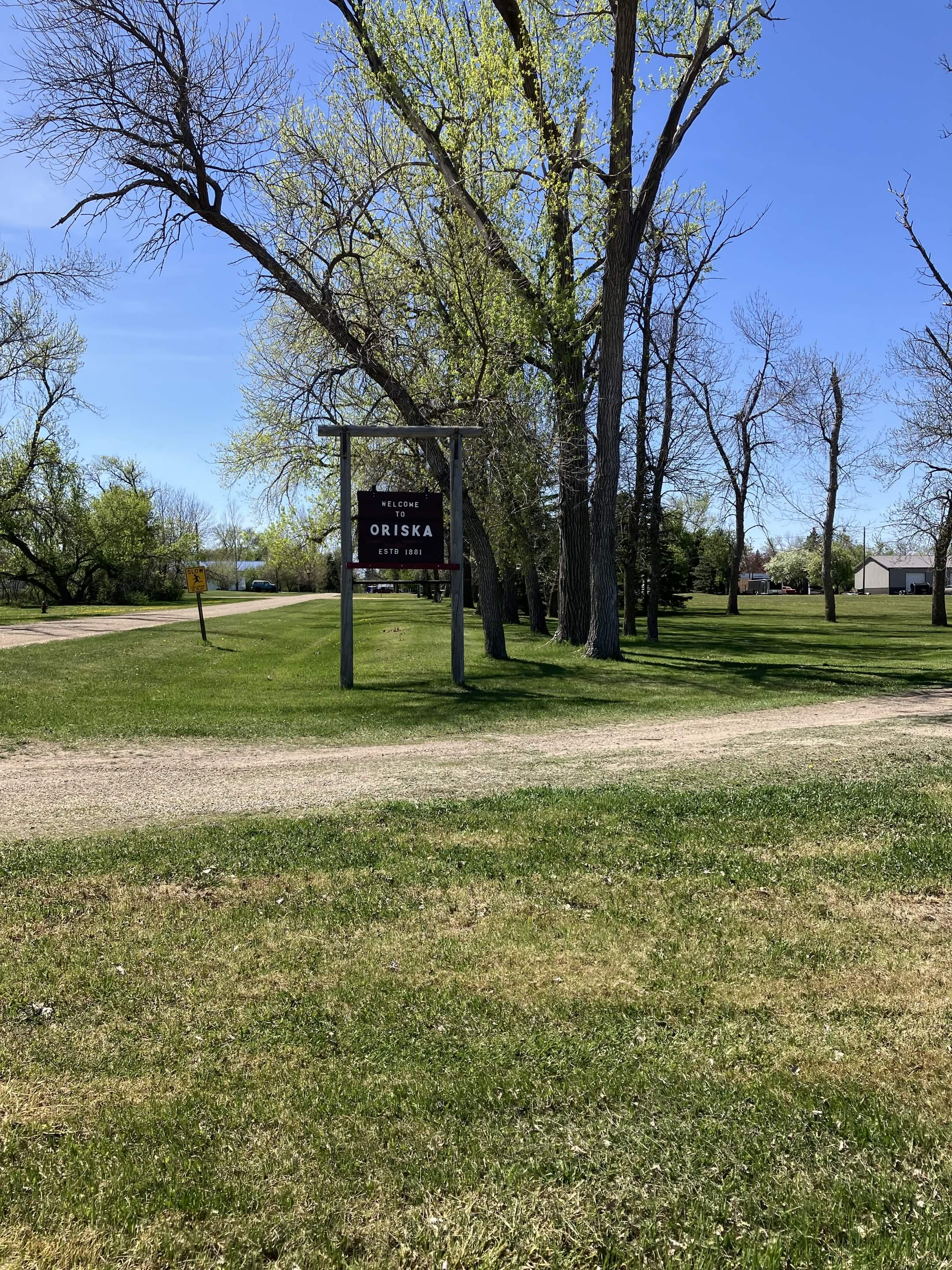

- Location of Oriska, North Dakota
- Coordinates: 46°55′53″N 97°47′21″W
- Country: United States
- State: North Dakota
- County: Barnes
- Founded: 1872

Area
  - Total: 0.27 sq mi (0.69 km^{2})
  - Land: 0.27 sq mi (0.69 km^{2})
  - Water: 0 sq mi (0.00 km^{2})
- Elevation: 1,270 ft (387 m)

Population (2020)
  - Total: 114
  - Estimate (2022): 110
  - Density: 427.2/sq mi (164.93/km^{2})
- Time zone: UTC-6 (Central (CST))
  - Summer (DST): UTC-5 (CDT)
- ZIP code: 58063
- Area code: 701
- FIPS code: 38-59660
- GNIS feature ID: 1030575

Oriska is a city in Barnes County, North Dakota, United States. The population was 114 at the 2020 census.

== History ==
Oriska was originally called Fourth Siding, and under the latter name was founded in 1872 when the railroad was extended to that point. The name Oriska was adopted in 1881. Oriska was named for a Native American character in a poem by Lydia Sigourney. A post office called Oriska has been in operation since 1881.

== Geography ==
Oriska is located at 46°55′53″N 97°47′21″W (46.931346, -97.789105).

According to the United States Census Bureau, the city has a total area of 0.28 square miles (0.73 km^{2}), all land.

== Demographics ==
Historical population
Census	Pop.	Note	%±
1920	300		—
1930	183		−39.0%
1940	217		18.6%
1950	135		−37.8%
1960	148		9.6%
1970	128		−13.5%
1980	125		−2.3%
1990	103		−17.6%
2000	128		24.3%
2010	118		−7.8%
2020	114		−3.4%
2022 (est.)	110		−3.5%
U.S. Decennial Census; 2020 Census

=== 2010 census ===
As of the census of 2010, there were 118 people, 48 households, and 32 families living in the city. The population density was 421.4 inhabitants per square mile (162.7/km^{2}). There were 63 housing units at an average density of 225.0 per square mile (86.9/km^{2}). The racial makeup of the city was 94.9% White, 4.2% from other races, and 0.8% from two or more races. Hispanic or Latino of any race were 4.2% of the population.

There were 48 households, of which 31.3% had children under the age of 18 living with them, 58.3% were married couples living together, 6.3% had a female householder with no husband present, 2.1% had a male householder with no wife present, and 33.3% were non-families. 29.2% of all households were made up of individuals, and 4.2% had someone living alone who was 65 years of age or older. The average household size was 2.46 and the average family size was 3.09.

The median age in the city was 41.3 years. 28% of residents were under the age of 18; 3.4% were between the ages of 18 and 24; 24.6% were from 25 to 44; 33.8% were from 45 to 64; and 10.2% were 65 years of age or older. The gender makeup of the city was 57.6% male and 42.4% female.

=== 2000 census ===
As of the census of 2000, there were 128 people, 47 households, and 31 families living in the city. The population density was 463.4 inhabitants per square mile (178.9/km^{2}). There were 57 housing units at an average density of 206.3 per square mile (79.7/km^{2}). The racial makeup of the city was 98.44% White, and 1.56% from two or more races. Hispanic or Latino of any race were 2.34% of the population.

There were 47 households, out of which 40.4% had children under the age of 18 living with them, 48.9% were married couples living together, 8.5% had a female householder with no husband present, and 34.0% were non-families. 27.7% of all households were made up of individuals, and 8.5% had someone living alone who was 65 years of age or older. The average household size was 2.72 and the average family size was 3.45.

In the city, the population was spread out, with 32.0% under the age of 18, 10.2% from 18 to 24, 30.5% from 25 to 44, 21.1% from 45 to 64, and 6.3% who were 65 years of age or older. The median age was 32 years. For every 100 females, there were 128.6 males. For every 100 females age 18 and over, there were 107.1 males.

The median income for a household in the city was $28,125, and the median income for a family was $26,667. Males had a median income of $18,333 versus $21,250 for females. The per capita income for the city was $10,818. There were 8.3% of families and 14.8% of the population living below the poverty line, including 19.4% of under eighteens and 22.2% of those over 64.

== Education ==
Maple Valley School District operates public schools serving Oriska.
