= Ypsilanti Township, Stutsman County, North Dakota =

Ypsilanti Township, North Dakota
- Township
- Location within the state of North Dakota
- Coordinates: 46°46′20″N 98°32′2″W
- Country: United States
- State: North Dakota
- County: Stutsman

Area
  - Total: 36.1 sq mi (93.4 km^{2})
  - Land: 36.1 sq mi (93.4 km^{2})
  - Water: 0 sq mi (0.0 km^{2})
- Elevation: 1,447 ft (441 m)

Population (2020)
  - Total: 160
  - Density: 4.7/sq mi (1.8/km^{2})
- Time zone: UTC-6 (Central (CST))
  - Summer (DST): UTC-5 (CDT)
- ZIP code: 58497
- Area code: 701
- FIPS code: 38-88060
- GNIS feature ID: 1036451

Ypsilanti Township is one of the sixty-two townships of Stutsman County, North Dakota, United States. The population was 160 at the 2020 census. The median household income was $29,444.

== History ==
Historical population
Census	Pop.	Note	%±
1910	241		—
1920	280		16.2%
1930	278		−0.7%
1940	203		−27.0%
1950	238		17.2%
1960	218		−8.4%
1970	208		−4.6%
1980	190		−8.7%
1990	154		−18.9%
2000	168		9.1%
2010	128		−23.8%
2020	160		25.0%
U.S. Decennial Census; 2020 Census

The United States Government granted 621 acres of land to the Northern Pacific Railroad in 1879. Part of this land became Ypsilanti Township and the Ypsilanti townsite. The town and township were named for Ypsilanti, Michigan.
