= Fingal, North Dakota =

- City
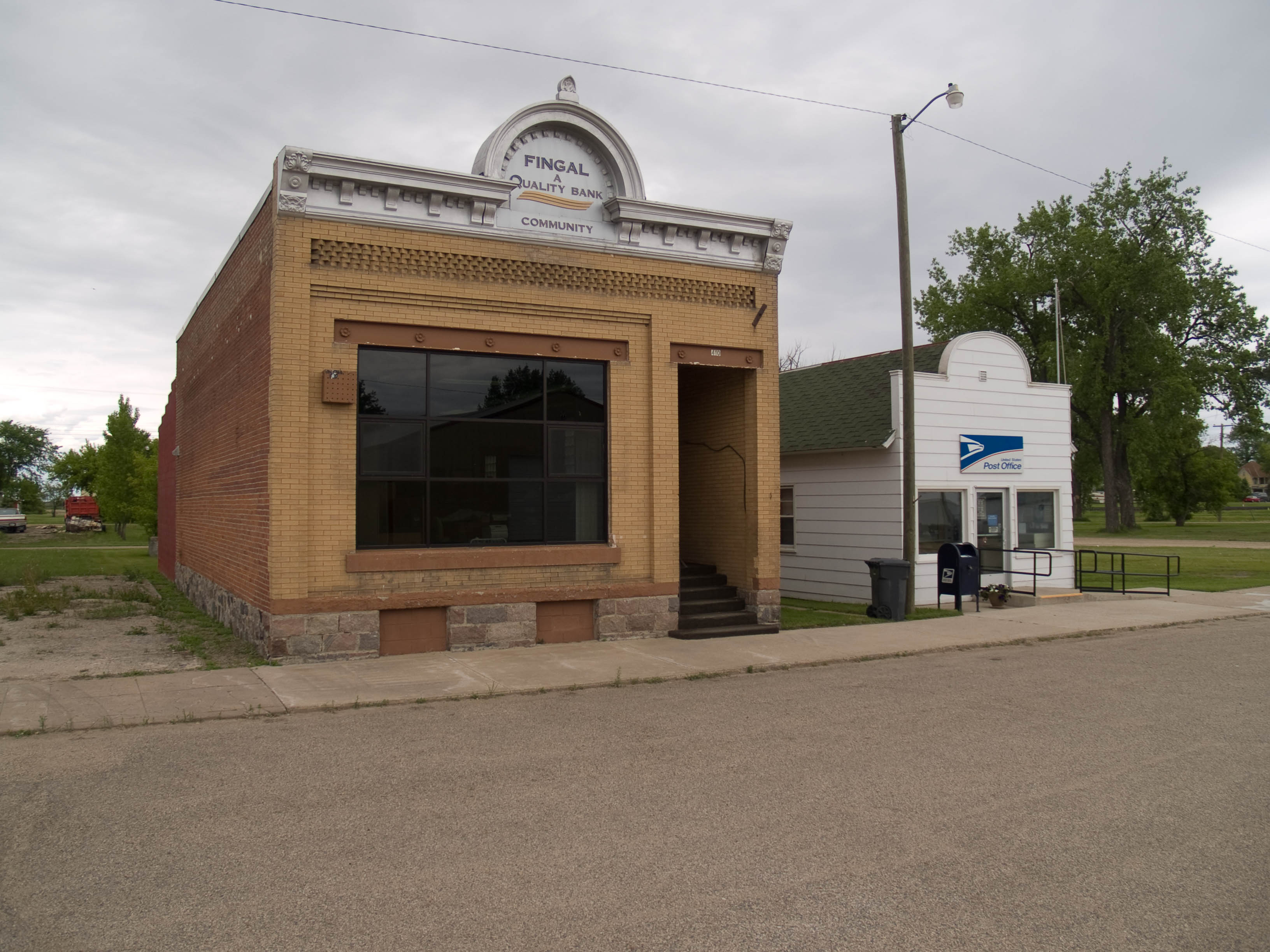
- Bank and post office in Fingal, North Dakota
- Nickname: Jewel of North Dakota
- Location of Fingal, North Dakota
- Coordinates: 46°45′44″N 97°47′34″W
- Country: United States
- State: North Dakota
- County: Barnes
- Founded: 1891

Government
  - Mayor: John Behm

Area
  - Total: 0.42 sq mi (1.08 km^{2})
  - Land: 0.42 sq mi (1.08 km^{2})
  - Water: 0 sq mi (0.00 km^{2})
- Elevation: 1,283 ft (391 m)

Population (2020)
  - Total: 92
  - Estimate (2022): 92
  - Density: 221.0/sq mi (85.34/km^{2})
- Time zone: UTC-6 (Central (CST))
  - Summer (DST): UTC-5 (CDT)
- ZIP code: 58031
- Area code: 701
- FIPS code: 38-26380
- GNIS feature ID: 1028958

Fingal is a city in Barnes County, North Dakota, United States. The population was 92 at the 2020 census. Fingal was founded in 1891.

Fingal was named and settled by immigrants from Fingal, Ontario, Canada.

== Geography ==
Fingal is located at 46°45′44″N 97°47′34″W (46.762311, -97.792828).

According to the United States Census Bureau, the city has a total area of 0.42 square miles (1.09 km^{2}), all land.

== Demographics ==
Historical population
| Census | Pop. | Note | %± |
|---|---|---|---|
| 1930 | 324 | | — |
| 1940 | 300 | | −7.4% |
| 1950 | 210 | | −30.0% |
| 1960 | 190 | | −9.5% |
| 1970 | 166 | | −12.6% |
| 1980 | 151 | | −9.0% |
| 1990 | 138 | | −8.6% |
| 2000 | 133 | | −3.6% |
| 2010 | 97 | | −27.1% |
| 2020 | 92 | | −5.2% |
| 2022 (est.) | 92 | | 0.0% |
U.S. Decennial Census; 2020 Census

=== 2010 census ===
As of the census of 2010, there were 97 people, 46 households, and 27 families living in the city. The population density was 231.0 inhabitants per square mile (89.2/km^{2}). There were 57 housing units at an average density of 135.7 per square mile (52.4/km^{2}). The racial makeup of the city was 96.9% White, 1.0% African American, and 2.1% Native American.

There were 46 households, of which 32.6% had children under the age of 18 living with them, 45.7% were married couples living together, 6.5% had a female householder with no husband present, 6.5% had a male householder with no wife present, and 41.3% were non-families. 34.8% of all households were made up of individuals, and 15.2% had someone living alone who was 65 years of age or older. The average household size was 2.11 and the average family size was 2.67.

The median age in the city was 41.5 years. 22.7% of residents were under the age of 18; 8.2% were between the ages of 18 and 24; 25.8% were from 25 to 44; 27.8% were from 45 to 64; and 15.5% were 65 years of age or older. The gender makeup of the city was 51.5% male and 48.5% female.

=== 2000 census ===
As of the census of 2000, there were 133 people, 51 households, and 36 families living in the city. The population density was 330.5 inhabitants per square mile (127.6/km^{2}). There were 62 housing units at an average density of 154.1 per square mile (59.5/km^{2}). The racial makeup of the city was 97.74% White, 0.75% Native American, and 1.50% from two or more races.

There were 51 households, out of which 31.4% had children under the age of 18 living with them, 56.9% were married couples living together, 13.7% had a female householder with no husband present, and 27.5% were non-families. 25.5% of all households were made up of individuals, and 19.6% had someone living alone who was 65 years of age or older. The average household size was 2.61 and the average family size was 3.16.

In the city, the population was spread out, with 30.1% under the age of 18, 5.3% from 18 to 24, 26.3% from 25 to 44, 15.8% from 45 to 64, and 22.6% who were 65 years of age or older. The median age was 34 years. For every 100 females, there were 95.6 males. For every 100 females age 18 and over, there were 93.8 males.

The median income for a household in the city was $35,875, and the median income for a family was $36,750. Males had a median income of $27,188 versus $22,500 for females. The per capita income for the city was $13,903. There were 2.3% of families and 4.2% of the population living below the poverty line, including 4.7% of under eighteens and 9.5% of those over 64.

== Education ==
Maple Valley School District operates public schools serving Fingal.
