= Tower City, North Dakota =

- City
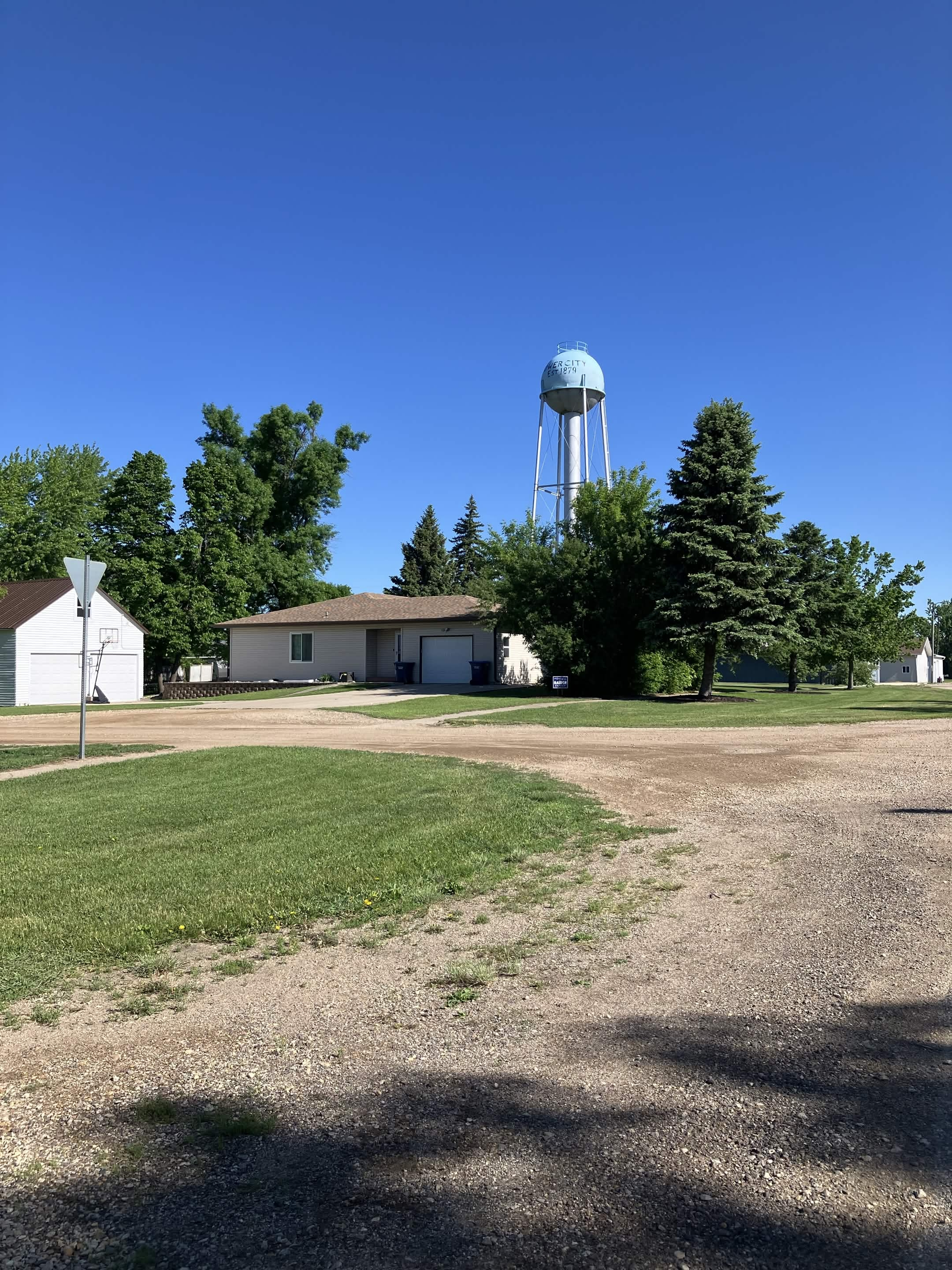

- Logo
- Motto: "Home of the ND State Horse Pull"
- Location of Tower City, North Dakota
- Coordinates: 46°55′35″N 97°40′34″W
- Country: United States
- State: North Dakota
- Counties: Cass, Barnes
- Founded: 1879
- Incorporated: 1881

Government
  - Mayor: Stacey Lilja

Area
  - Total: 2.049 sq mi (5.308 km^{2})
  - Land: 2.049 sq mi (5.308 km^{2})
  - Water: 0 sq mi (0.000 km^{2})
- Elevation: 1,171 ft (357 m)

Population (2020)
  - Total: 268
  - Estimate (2023): 275
  - Density: 130.8/sq mi (50.49/km^{2})
- Time zone: UTC–6 (Central (CST))
  - Summer (DST): UTC–5 (CDT)
- ZIP Code: 58071
- Area code: 701
- FIPS code: 38-79340
- GNIS feature ID: 1036298
- Website: towercitynd.com

Tower City is a city in Barnes and Cass counties in the State of North Dakota. The population was 268 at the 2020 census.

== History ==
Tower City was laid out in 1879. Founded as a station on the Northern Pacific Railroad, it was named for Charlemagne Tower, a railroad official. A post office has been in operation at Tower City since 1879. The city was incorporated in 1881.

== Geography ==
According to the United States Census Bureau, the city has a total area of 2.049 square miles (5.31 km^{2}), all land.

== Demographics ==
Historical population
Census	Pop.	Note	%±
1880	159		—
1890	309		94.3%
1900	468		51.5%
1910	452		−3.4%
1920	447		−1.1%
1930	435		−2.7%
1940	364		−16.3%
1950	292		−19.8%
1960	300		2.7%
1970	289		−3.7%
1980	293		1.4%
1990	233		−20.5%
2000	252		8.2%
2010	253		0.4%
2020	268		5.9%
2023 (est.)	275		2.6%
U.S. Decennial Census; 2020 Census

=== 2010 census ===
As of the 2010 census, there were 253 people, 106 households, and 72 families living in the city. The population density was 121.6 inhabitants per square mile (47.0/km^{2}). There were 115 housing units at an average density of 55.3 per square mile (21.4/km^{2}). The racial makeup of the city was 97.6% White, 1.6% Native American, and 0.8% from two or more races.

There were 106 households, of which 34.9% had children under the age of 18 living with them, 51.9% were married couples living together, 7.5% had a female householder with no husband present, 8.5% had a male householder with no wife present, and 32.1% were non-families. 25.5% of all households were made up of individuals, and 9.4% had someone living alone who was 65 years of age or older. The average household size was 2.39 and the average family size was 2.81.

The median age in the city was 39.6 years. 24.1% of residents were under the age of 18; 5.8% were between the ages of 18 and 24; 33.9% were from 25 to 44; 25.6% were from 45 to 64; and 10.3% were 65 years of age or older. The gender makeup of the city was 51.4% male and 48.6% female.

=== 2000 census ===
As of the 2000 census, there were 252 people, 107 households, and 75 families living in the city. The population density was 121.2 inhabitants per square mile (46.8/km^{2}). There were 113 housing units at an average density of 54.3 per square mile (21.0/km^{2}). The racial makeup of the city was 98.81% White, and 1.19% from two or more races.

There were 107 households, out of which 35.5% had children under the age of 18 living with them, 59.8% were married couples living together, 4.7% had a female householder with no husband present, and 29.9% were non-families. 26.2% of all households were made up of individuals, and 13.1% had someone living alone who was 65 years of age or older. The average household size was 2.36 and the average family size was 2.87.

In the city, the population was spread out, with 27.4% under the age of 18, 4.4% from 18 to 24, 28.2% from 25 to 44, 24.6% from 45 to 64, and 15.5% who were 65 years of age or older. The median age was 38 years. For every 100 females, there were 104.9 males. For every 100 females age 18 and over, there were 103.3 males.

The median income for a household in the city was $31,607, and the median income for a family was $41,250. Males had a median income of $26,806 versus $21,875 for females. The per capita income for the city was $15,652. About 5.1% of families and 6.4% of the population were below the poverty line, including 10.7% of those under the age of eighteen and 4.9% of those 65 or over.

== Education ==
Tower City is served by the Maple Valley Public School District. The district has two elementary schools and one high school. Maple Valley High School is located in Tower City.
