= Jamestown Public Schools (North Dakota) =

School district in North Dakota, United States

Coordinates: 46°54′25″N 98°42′21″W

Jamestown Public Schools is a system of public schools located in Jamestown, North Dakota.

== History ==
Robert Lech, previously superintendent of Pleasant School District and Beulah Public Schools, became superintendent effective July 1, 2013. He was ranked North Dakota Superintendent of the year in 2016.

== Schools ==
=== Elementary schools ===
- Wm. S. Gussner Elementary School (Wildcats)
- Lincoln Elementary School (Lions)
- Louis L’Amour Elementary School (Lobos)
- Roosevelt Elementary School (Raiders)

=== Middle school ===
- Jamestown Middle School (Blue Jays)

=== High school ===
- Jamestown High School (Blue Jays)

=== Career and technical training ===
- James Valley Career & Technology Center
- JHS Transitional Living (for students with disabilities)
