= Ypsilanti, North Dakota =

- CDP & Unincorporated community
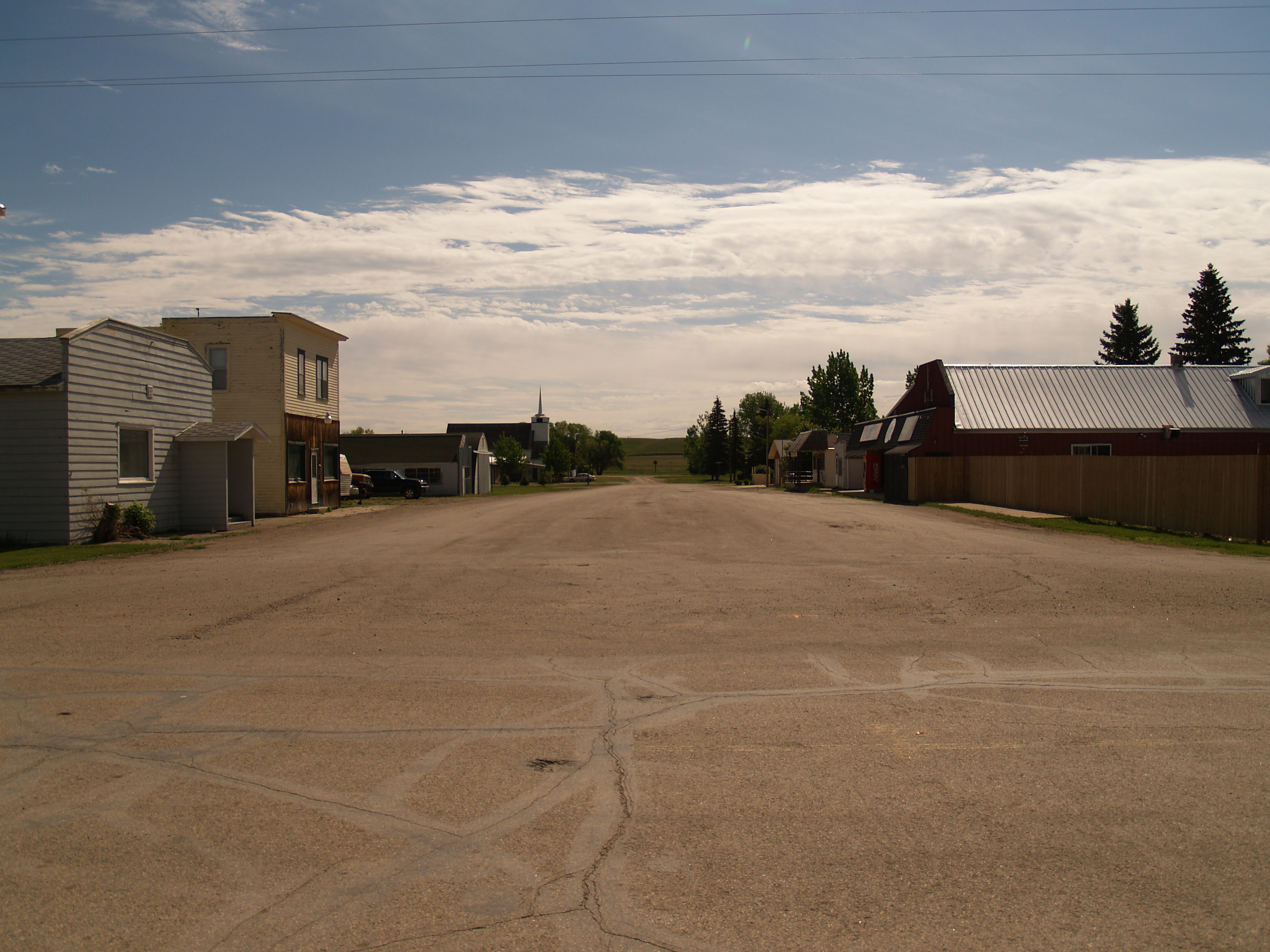
- Business district of Ypsilanti (June 2008)
- Interactive map of Ypsilanti, North Dakota
- Location within North Dakota
- Coordinates: 46.7834°N 98.5610°W
- Country: United States
- State: North Dakota
- County: Stutsman
- Founded: March 1882
- Founded by: William Hartley Colby; Lloyd DePuy

Area
  - Total: 0.553 sq mi (1.432 km^{2})
  - Land: 0.553 sq mi (1.432 km^{2})
  - Water: 0 sq mi (0.000 km^{2}) 0.00%
- Elevation: 1,394 ft (425 m)

Population (2020)
  - Total: 109
  - Estimate (2025): 0
  - Density: 197/sq mi (76.1/km^{2})
- Time zone: UTC–6 (Central (CST))
  - Summer (DST): UTC–5 (CDT)
- ZIP Code: 58497
- Area code: 701
- FIPS code: 38-88020
- GNIS feature ID: 2584359

Ypsilanti is a census-designated place and unincorporated community in Stutsman County, North Dakota, United States, and the primary populated place in Ypsilanti Township. A portion of the townsite is located in Corwin Township. The population was 109 as of the 2020 census, and was estimated at 0 in 2025.

== History ==
In 1879, the U.S. Government gave 621 acres of land to the Northern Pacific Railway, and part of this became Ypsilanti Township and the townsite of Ypsilanti.

The townsite of Ypsilanti was platted by William Hartley Colby and a partner by the name of Lloyd DePuy. W.H. Colby had come from Ypsilanti, Michigan, so he named the new townsite after the Michigan city by that name.

The Ypsilanti Post Office was first established in the Theodore Doughty home, one-half mile north of Ypsilanti, which also served as the Ypsilanti stagecoach stop. In 1882, the post office was moved to Ypsilanti proper. At one point, date uncertain, the post office was moved to the Spaulding Store, where it remained until 1921, when it was moved to the Lee Ferguson Store. In June 1953, an addition was built onto the Heffernan house, which served as the post office until September 1, 1967, at which time a stand-alone post office was constructed.

The dam at Ypsilanti Park was constructed in 1931 and 1932, as a W.P.A. Project. Shortly afterward, the park was built alongside the dam. Ed Whitney donated the land where the park is located, while the original park equipment was contributed by Ypsilanti businesses and organizations, and James Crouch built the first two fireplaces at the park. The chief organizers of the park construction were Stan Nicholls, Bob Kotts, and a man named Glaspell.

== Geography ==
According to the United States Census Bureau, the CDP has a total area of 0.553 square miles (1.43 km^{2}), all land.

== Climate ==
This climatic region is typified by large seasonal temperature differences, with warm to hot (and often humid) summers and cold (sometimes severely cold) winters. According to the Köppen Climate Classification system, Ypsilanti has a humid continental climate, abbreviated "Dfb" on climate maps.

== Demographics ==
Historical population
| Census | Pop. | Note | %± |
|---|---|---|---|
| 2010 | 104 | | — |
| 2020 | 109 | | 4.8% |
| 2025 (est.) | 0 | | −100.0% |
U.S. Decennial Census; 2020 Census

As of the 2024 American Community Survey, there were 21 estimated households in Ypsilanti with an average of 2.62 persons per household. The CDP has a median household income of $0. Approximately 0.0% of the CDP's population lives at or below the poverty line. Ypsilanti has an estimated 100.0% employment rate, with 0.0% of the population holding a bachelor's degree or higher and 0.0% holding a high school diploma. There were 66 housing units at an average density of 119.35 per square mile (46.1/km^{2}).

The top five reported languages (people were allowed to report up to two languages, thus the figures will generally add to more than 100%) were English (100.0%), Spanish (0.0%), Indo-European (0.0%), Asian and Pacific Islander (0.0%), and Other (0.0%).

The median age in the CDP was 23.3 years.

Ypsilanti, North Dakota – racial and ethnic composition Note: the US Census treats Hispanic/Latino as an ethnic category. This table excludes Latinos from the racial categories and assigns them to a separate category. Hispanics/Latinos may be of any race.
| Race / ethnicity (NH = non-Hispanic) | Pop. 2010 | Pop. 2020 | % 2010 | % 2020 |
|---|---|---|---|---|
| White alone (NH) | 100 | 103 | 96.15% | 94.50% |
| Black or African American alone (NH) | 0 | 1 | 0.00% | 0.92% |
| Native American or Alaska Native alone (NH) | 0 | 0 | 0.00% | 0.00% |
| Asian alone (NH) | 0 | 1 | 0.00% | 0.92% |
| Pacific Islander alone (NH) | 0 | 0 | 0.00% | 0.00% |
| Other race alone (NH) | 0 | 0 | 0.00% | 0.00% |
| Mixed race or multiracial (NH) | 0 | 1 | 0.00% | 0.92% |
| Hispanic or Latino (any race) | 4 | 3 | 3.85% | 2.75% |
| Total | 104 | 109 | 100.00% | 100.00% |

=== 2020 census ===
As of the 2020 census, there were 109 people, 46 households, and 27 families residing in the CDP. The population density was 198.91 inhabitants per square mile (76.8/km^{2}). There were 54 housing units at an average density of 98.54 per square mile (38.0/km^{2}). The racial makeup of the CDP was 92.66% White, 0.92% African American, 0.00% Native American, 0.92% Asian, 0.00% Pacific Islander, 0.00% from some other races and 3.67% from two or more races. Hispanic or Latino people of any race were 2.75% of the population.

=== 2010 census ===
As of the 2010 census, there were 104 people, 45 households, and 26 families residing in the CDP. The population density was 189.78 inhabitants per square mile (73.3/km^{2}). There were 52 housing units at an average density of 94.89 per square mile (36.6/km^{2}). The racial makeup of the CDP was 97.12% White, 0.00% African American, 0.00% Native American, 0.00% Asian, 0.00% Pacific Islander, 0.00% from some other races and 2.88% from two or more races. Hispanic or Latino people of any race were 3.85% of the population.
