= Chase Lake National Wildlife Refuge =

Wildlife reserve in North Dakota, U.S.

- IUCN category IV (habitat/species management area)
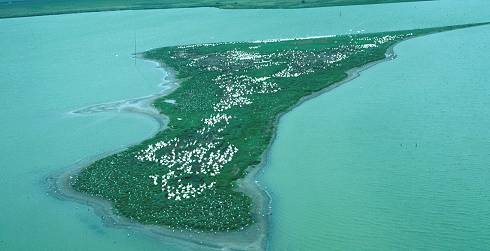
- White pelicans nesting on an island in Chase Lake

- Location within the United States
- Location: Stutsman County, North Dakota, United States
- Nearest city: Medina, ND
- Coordinates: 47°1′22″N 99°26′40″W
- Area: 4,385 acres (17.75 km^{2})
- Established: 1908
- Governing body: U.S. Fish and Wildlife Service
- Website: Chase Lake National Wildlife Refuge

Chase Lake National Wildlife Refuge is located in the U.S. state of North Dakota around Chase Lake. The majority of the land area of the refuge has been designated as wilderness and is known as the Chase Lake Wilderness. The refuge is one of the oldest in the U.S., having been set aside in 1908. The refuge is home to one of the largest nesting colonies of white pelicans in the U.S.

== Ecology ==
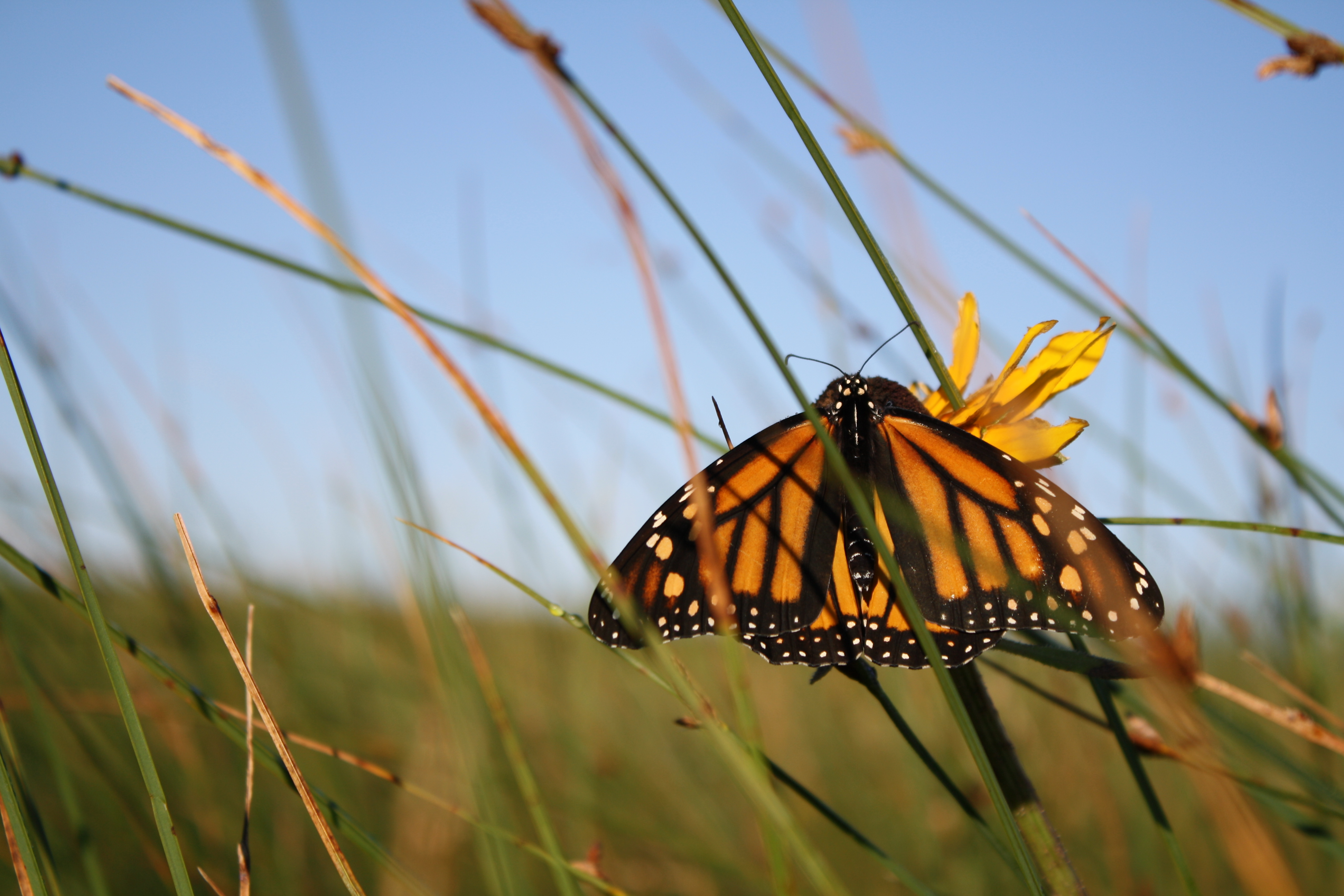
Monarch butterfly (Danaus plexippus) found resting on a native prairie flower, black-eyed Susan (Rudbeckia hirta) at Chase Lake NWR

In 2002, a record of 35,466 breeding pelicans were observed in the refuge. The pelicans have enjoyed a tremendous rebound from the 50 or so individuals that existed in the region when first counted in 1908. Tending to nest on two large islands within the lake for protection from predators, Chase Lake is an alkaline lake and supports few fish species, so the pelicans rely on the plentiful tiger salamander as a food source.

Many other bird species can also be found here including herons, loons, ibises, ducks, geese, hawks and terns to name but a few. White-tailed deer, weasels, coyote and badger also inhabit the refuge.

Dominant plants include blue grama (Bouteloua gracilis) and green needle grass (Nassella viridula).

== Administration ==
Chase Lake NWR is managed through Arrowwood National Wildlife Refuge Complex and in turn, a number of other refuges and wetland management districts are managed from Chase Lake including:

- Chase Lake WMD
- Chase Lake Prairie Project
- Valley City WMD
- Tomahawk NWR
- Stoney Slough NWR
- Sibley Lake NWR
- Halfway Lake NWR
- Hobart Lake NWR

== Research ==
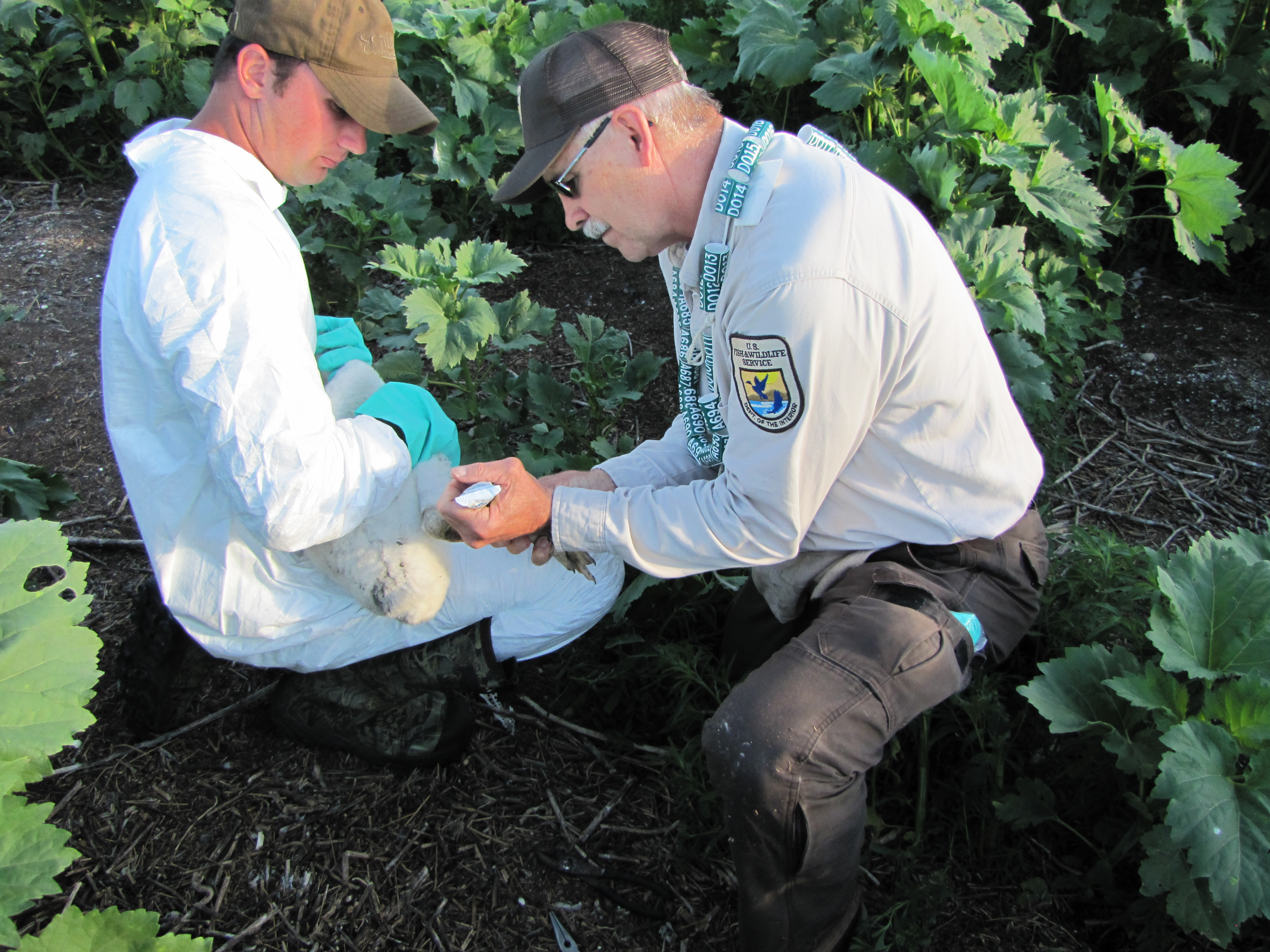
Pelican Banding at Chase Lake NWR, 2010

American White Pelican surveys have been conducted every year since 1972. These surveys estimate the number of breeding adults in the colony at Chase Lake National Wildlife Refuge. Starting in 1928, pelicans have been banded, and these same birds have been found as far as Florida, California, and many Gulf Coast States.

Terrestrial ecological monitoring started within the refuge in 2014. This includes surveys on birds, small mammals, ground beetles, mosquitoes, and ticks. Aquatic sampling takes place at Prairie Pothole, the watershed of which is managed as part of the Chase Lake National Wildlife Refuge.

== Chase Lake Wilderness ==
The Chase Lake Wilderness is a United States Wilderness Area, that at 4,155 acres (16.81 km^{2}), covers the majority of the land area of Chase Lake National Wildlife Refuge. It is also managed by the USFWS. The wilderness was designated by Congress in 1975.

No camping is permitted in the wilderness and some areas are completely off limits to people, especially during the nesting season. A few trails allow access for bird watching and visitors are encouraged to remain on designated trails.
