= Chase Lake (disambiguation) =

Chase Lake is a lake in Stutsman County, North Dakota.

Chase Lake may also refer to:

- Chase Lake (Fulton County, New York), a lake in Fulton County, New York
- Chase Lake (Itasca County, Minnesota), a lake in Itasca County, Minnesota

== Associated with North Dakota lake ==
- Chase Lake National Wildlife Refuge, protected wildlife habitat around Chase Lake, North Dakota
- Chase Lake Prairie Project, managed ecoregion around Chase Lake, North Dakota
- Chase Lake Wetland Management District, protected habitat management area around Chase Lake, North Dakota
- Chase Lake Wilderness, protected wilderness area around Chase Lake, North Dakota
