= Arrowwood Wetland Management District =

- IUCN category IV (habitat/species management area)
- Location within the United States
- Location: Foster and Eddy Counties, North Dakota, United States
- Nearest city: Pingree, North Dakota
- Coordinates: 47°33′12″N 98°44′36″W
- Area: 28,922 acres (11,704 ha)
- Established: September, 1961
- Governing body: U.S. Fish and Wildlife Service
- Website: Arrowwood Wetland Management District

Arrowwood Wetland Management District is located in the U.S. state of North Dakota. Arrowwood WMD is a part of the Arrowwood National Wildlife Refuge Complex, and is managed by the U.S. Fish and Wildlife Service. The district consists of 28 Waterfowl Production Areas, 314 Wetland easements (cooperative arrangements with private landowners), one easement refuge known as Johnson Lake National Wildlife Refuge and another four easements through the Farmers Home Administration, altogether totalling 28,922 acres (117 km^{2}).

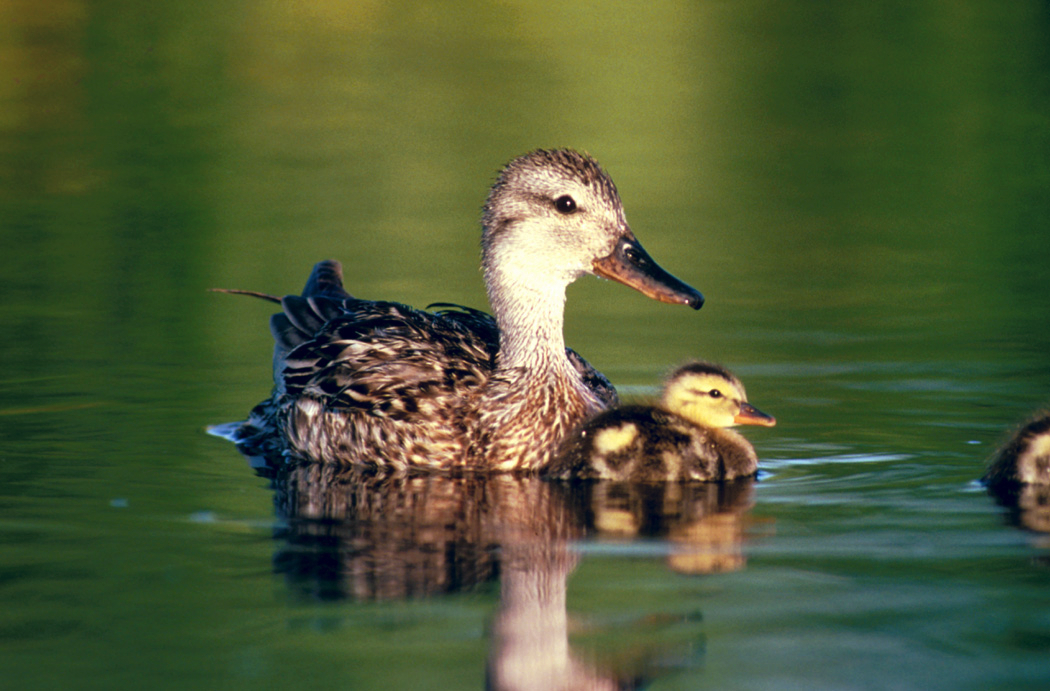
Gadwall hen with duckling at Arrowwood WMD

Arrowwood WMD is in the center of what is known as the prairie–potholes country. When the ice ages ended 15,000 years ago, the weight of the glacial ice had displaced the soil beneath them, creating depressions which later filled up with water into countless lakes and ponds. In the centuries since, migratory birds have come to depend on these wetlands for food and as nesting areas. Over 250 species of birds have been spotted in the refuge. More than a dozen species of ducks and wading birds have been documented. The most common waterfowl usually seen include the Canada geese, mallards, pintails, blue-winged teal, shovelers, and gadwall. Other bird species that are relatively common include grebe, double-crested cormorant, great blue heron, black-crowned night heron, and American bittern. Other shorebirds such as the plover are also common.

Mammals such as white-tailed deer, badger, skunk, beaver, raccoon, mink, muskrat, coyote and sharp-tailed grouse, along with other grassland dwellers such as the exotic ring-necked pheasant, are known to exist in the wetland management district.

The refuge permits hunting and fishing in season and with proper permit. Hunting is legal but only for deer, upland game birds such as grouse, fox and rabbits.
