= Arrowwood National Wildlife Refuge Complex =

Group of protected areas in North Dakota, US

The Arrowwood National Wildlife Refuge Complex consists of numerous National Wildlife Refuges and Wetland Management Districts in the U.S. state of North Dakota. Altogether, twelve separate areas are in the complex, with the Chase Lake Prairie Project being the largest at 5.5 million acres (22,000 km^{2}).

== Description ==
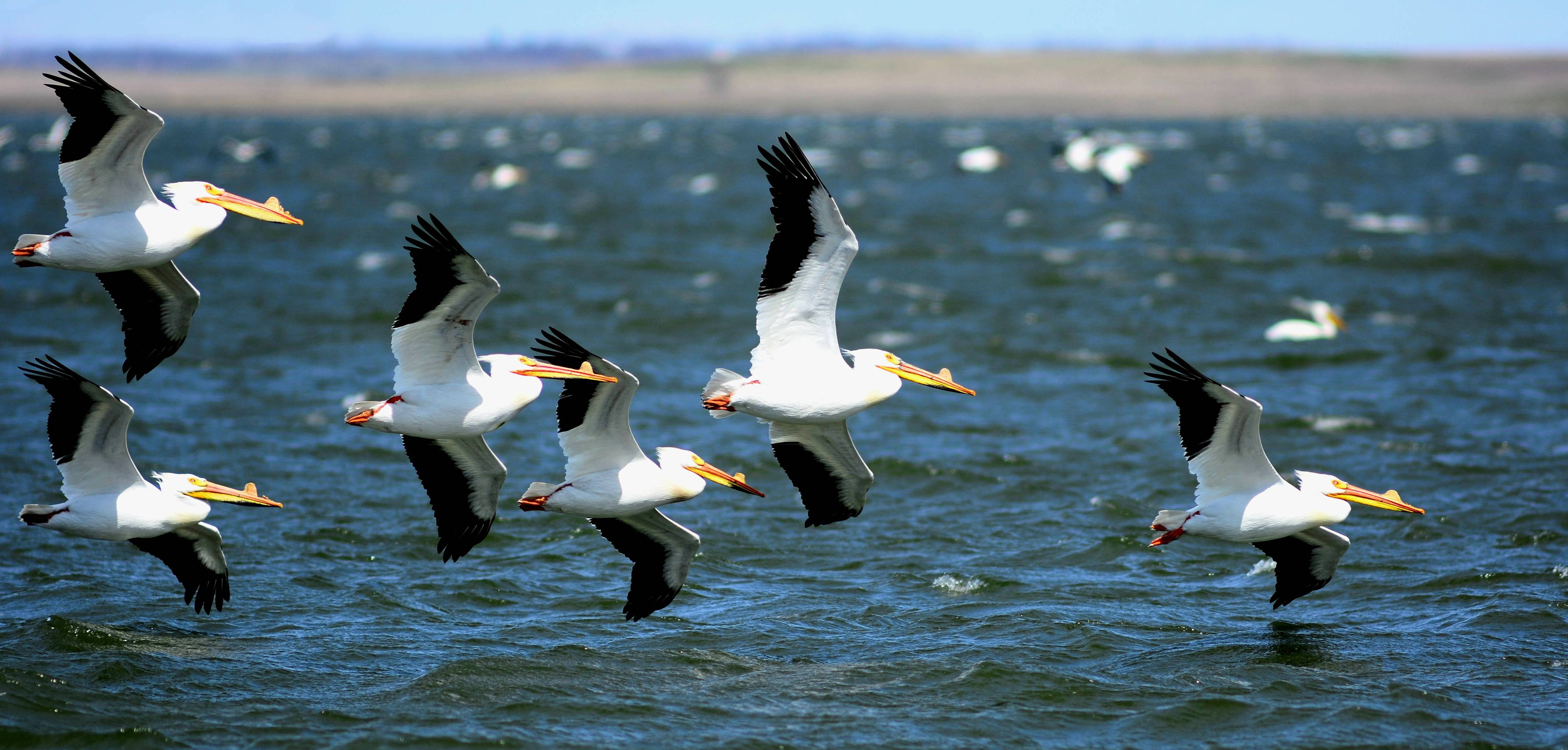
Pelicans at Chase Lake National Wildlife Refuge

A National Wildlife Refuge Complex is an administrative grouping of two or more refuges, wetland management districts or other refuge conservation areas that are primarily managed from a central office location. Refuges are grouped into a complex structure because they occur in a similar ecological region, such as a watershed or specific habitat type, and have a related purpose and management needs.

The Complex is responsible for the management of all National Wildlife Refuge System lands in nine counties in east central North Dakota. Additionally, the Chase Lake Prairie Project, a component of the North American Waterfowl Management Plan, includes 5.5 million acres in 11 counties. The Headquarters for the Complex is located on Arrowwood National Wildlife Refuge near Pingree, North Dakota. The two other offices are the Chase Lake Prairie Project near Woodworth, North Dakota and the Valley City Wetland Management District near Valley City, North Dakota.

== Lands managed ==
The protected areas managed include:

- Arrowwood National Wildlife Refuge
  - Johnson Lake National Wildlife Refuge (easement refuge)
- Arrowwood Wetland Management District
- Chase Lake National Wildlife Refuge
- Chase Lake Wetland Management District
  - Half-way Lake National Wildlife Refuge (easement refuge)
- Valley City Wetland Management District
  - Hobart Lake National Wildlife Refuge (easement refuge)
  - Sibley Lake National Wildlife Refuge (easement refuge)
  - Stoney Slough National Wildlife Refuge (easement refuge)
  - Tomahawk National Wildlife Refuge (easement refuge)
