= Chase Lake =

Lake in North Dakota, United States

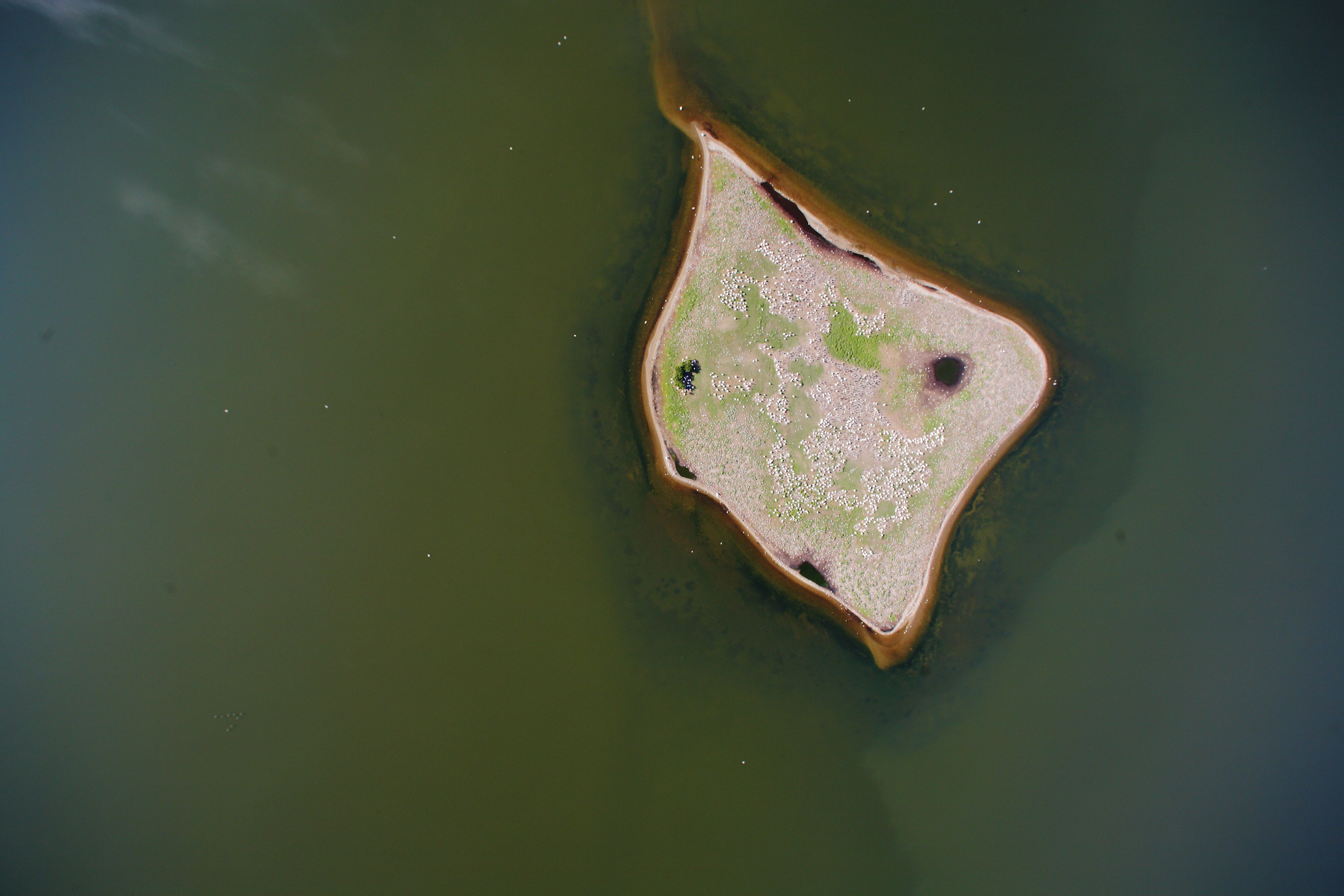
- Aerial view of birds on a nesting island within Chase Lake

- Location within North Dakota
- Location: Stutsman County, North Dakota
- Coordinates: 47°00′30″N 99°26′31″W
- Type: Lake
- Basin countries: United States
- Managing agency: U.S. Fish and Wildlife Service
- Surface area: 2,053 acres (8.31 km^{2})
- Surface elevation: 1,729 feet (527 m)

Chase Lake is a 2,053 acres (8.31 km^{2}), shallow lake in Stutsman County, North Dakota. It is the focal point of several protected areas administered by the U.S. Fish and Wildlife Service and U.S. Geographical Survey. It is known as one of the largest nesting areas for the American white pelican.

== Characteristics ==
Chase Lake has an area of 2,053 acres (8.31 km^{2}). It is about 2 miles (3.2 km) long and round in shape. It is usually considered shallow, but the water level varies seasonally. There is no outflow for the lake. It is highly alkaline.

In 1926, the lake was described as being "so strongly alkaline that white salts were piled up six inches deep in some places along its shores." Since 1993, water levels have been consistently rising due to heavier precipitation. As a result, island topography in the lake has been changing, and the water has been steadily becoming less alkaline.

There are two main islands of the lake. One is 9 acres (36,000 m^{2}), the other 7 acres (28,000 m^{2}). Depending on the water level, smaller islands may surface.

== Ecology ==
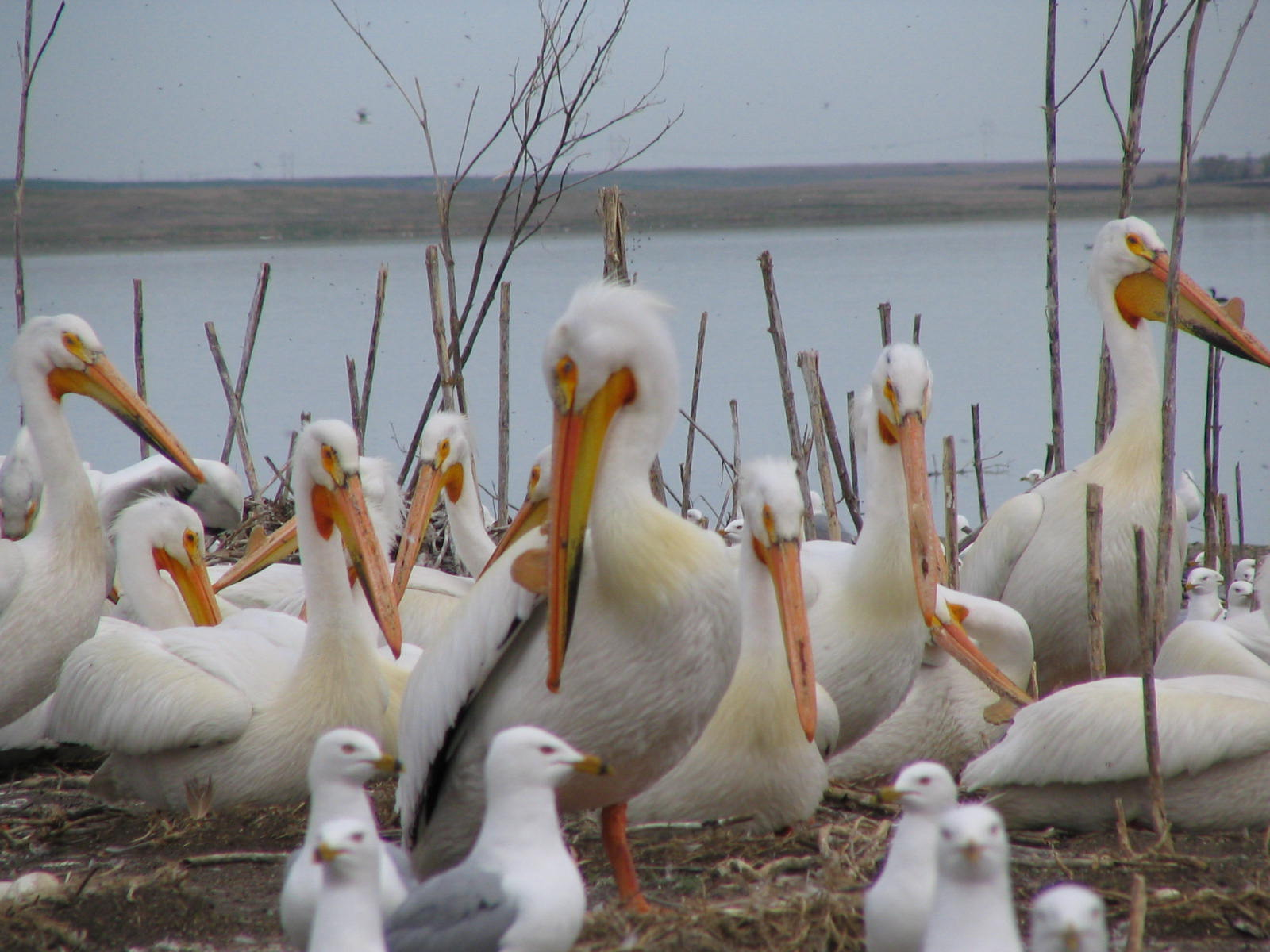
Nesting American white pelicans on Chase Lake

Chase Lake is home to one of the largest breeding colonies of American white pelicans (Pelecanus erythrorhynchos) in North America. The pelican nesting grounds at Chase Lake were first documented in 1863. After a burst of human settlement starting in 1872, the pelicans were nearly hunted to extirpation. The population was down to 50 individuals in 1905.

Gulls and double-crested cormorants are common birds that also nest at the lake.

In 1926, it was observed that no reeds or rushes grew in the lake, and there were no trees around the water. Brine shrimp (Artemia salina), brine flies (of the genus Ephydra), and water boatmen (of the family Corixidae) can be found at the lake. Formerly known for its lack of any aquatic vertebrate life, the lake now supports populations of tiger salamanders (Ambystoma mavortium) and fathead minnows (Pimephales promelas).

== Administration and land management ==
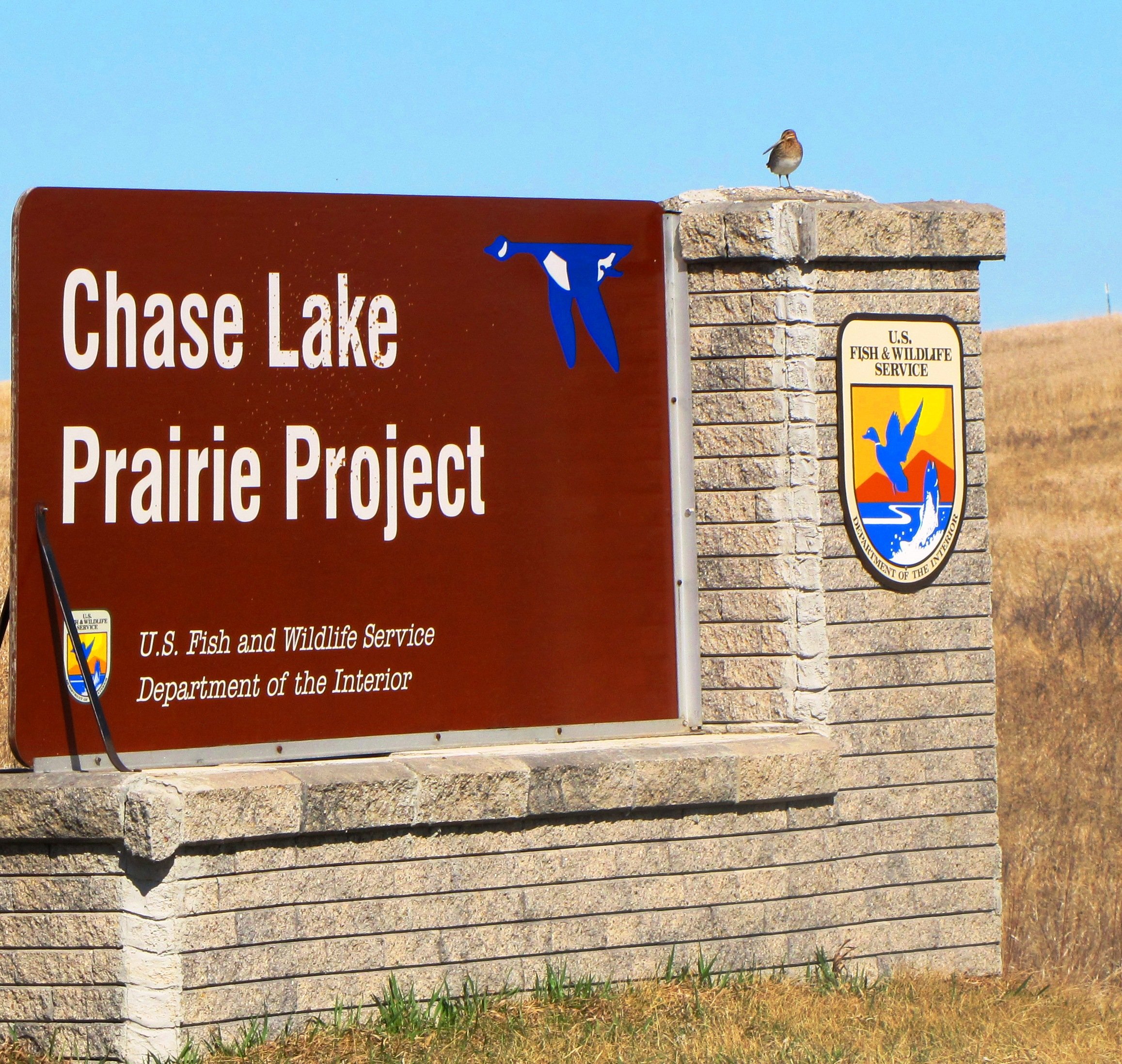
Chase Lake Prairie Project sign

There are several areas managed by agencies of the United States government for the purpose of protecting wildlife at Chase Lake and the greater Prairie Pothole Region.

Chase Lake is fully encompassed within the 1,776 hectare Chase Lake National Wildlife Refuge, part of the greater Arrowwwood National Wildlife Refuge Complex. 1,683 hectares (4,160 acres) of the refuge was designated as the Chase Lake Wilderness in 1975. An additional 1,148 hectares (2,840 acres) adjacent to the Chase Lake NWR is owned and managed as the Chase Lake Wildlife Management Area by the North Dakota Game and Fish Department.

The surrounding 140,000 acres (570 km^{2}) are administered as the Chase Lake Wetland Management District. Of this, 44,000 acres (180 km^{2}) are actively conserved through 136 waterfowl production areas. Furthermore, the Chase Lake Prairie Project is 5,500,000 acres (22,000 km^{2}) of land over 11 counties of North Dakota designated for improvement of habitat and wetland restoration efforts. This is predominantly on private land.
