= Arrowwood National Wildlife Refuge =

Protected area in North Dakota, US

- IUCN category IV (habitat/species management area)
- Location within the United States
- Location: Stutsman / Foster counties, North Dakota, United States
- Nearest city: Pingree, ND
- Coordinates: 47°16′28″N 98°51′29″W
- Area: 15,934 acres (6,448 ha)
- Established: September 4, 1935
- Visitors: 14,500 (in 2004)
- Governing body: U.S. Fish and Wildlife Service
- Website: Arrowwood National Wildlife Refuge

Arrowwood National Wildlife Refuge is located in the U.S. state of North Dakota. Arrowwood NWR is a part of the Arrowwood National Wildlife Refuge Complex, and is managed by the U.S. Fish and Wildlife Service. The refuge parallels 16 miles (27 km) of the James River and is a mixture of wetlands, forest and prairie. Efforts to ensure the refuge continues to provide prime nesting habitat for waterfowl include prescribed fire, haying, crop cultivation and livestock grazing. The refuge has forests with oak and hackberry which are uncommon on the prairie. It is believed that the name for the refuge is derived from Native American naming for arrow wood, as the wood in the forest was prized for the making of arrows.

During spring and fall migrations, between 90 and 100,000 waterfowl may be on the refuge. Over 100 species of birds have been spotted in the refuge. More than a dozen species of ducks and wading birds have been documented. The most common waterfowl usually seen include the Canada geese, mallards, pintails, blue-winged teal, shovelers, and gadwall. Other bird species that are relatively common include grebe, double-crested cormorant, great blue heron, black-crowned night heron, and American bittern. Other shorebirds such as the plover are also common.

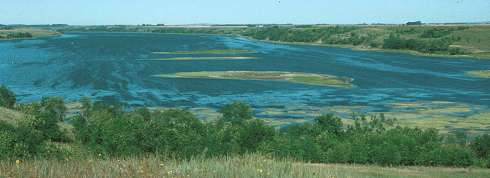
Wetlands located on the refuge

Mammals such as white-tailed deer, badger, skunk, beaver, raccoon, mink, muskrat, along with other grassland dwellers such as the exotic ring-necked pheasant, and sharp-tailed grouse.

The refuge permits hunting and fishing in season and with proper permit. Hunting is legal but only for deer, upland game birds such as grouse, fox and rabbits. There is a 5.5 mile (9.7 km) nature trail that leads from the visitor center, although it may be closed during certain times of the year such as during the nesting season.
