= Tomahawk National Wildlife Refuge =

- IUCN category IV (habitat/species management area)
- Location within the United States
- Location: Barnes County, North Dakota, United States
- Nearest city: Valley City, ND
- Coordinates: 47°4′52″N 98°11′16″W
- Area: 440 acres (180 ha)
- Governing body: U.S. Fish and Wildlife Service

The Tomahawk National Wildlife Refuge is located in the U.S. state of North Dakota and consists of 440 acres (1.78 km^{2}). Tomahawk NWR is a privately owned easement refuge, managed with by the U.S. Fish and Wildlife Service. The refuge was established to protect habitat for migratory bird species, white-tail deer and other mammals. Valley City Wetland Management District oversees the refuge, which in turn is a part of the Arrowwood National Wildlife Refuge Complex. The refuge can be accessed from North Dakota Highway 1, and is one mile (1.6 km) east of the town of Rogers, North Dakota.
