= Hobart Lake National Wildlife Refuge =

Easement Refuge in Barnes County, North Dakota

- IUCN category IV (habitat/species management area)
- Location within the United States
- Location: Barnes County, North Dakota, USA
- Nearest city: Valley City, North Dakota
- Coordinates: 46°55′5.9555″N 98°7′52.2120″W
- Area: 2,077 acres (8.41 km^{2})
- Established: 1930s
- Governing body: U.S. Fish and Wildlife Service

Hobart Lake National Wildlife Refuge is a 2,077-acre (8.41 km^{2}) Easement Refuge located in Barnes County, North Dakota five miles (8 km) west of Valley City.

The refuge was established by Executive Orders during the Franklin D. Roosevelt administration and was set aside as "a refuge and breeding grounds for migratory birds and other wildlife". The refuge is maintained by the Valley City Wetland Management District and is a part of the Arrowwood National Wildlife Refuge Complex.

The refuge is a migration stopover for waterfowl. In addition, tundra swans frequently use the refuge during spring and fall migrations. Much of the refuge lands are cultivated by the owner; however, some waterfowl nesting and brood rearing takes place on portions of the refuge. There are some limited opportunities for wildlife observation and photography from public roads around the refuge.

== See also ==
- List of National Wildlife Refuges
