= Half-Way Lake National Wildlife Refuge =

Easement refuge in North Dakota

- IUCN category IV (habitat/species management area)
- Location within the United States
- Location: Stutsman County, North Dakota, United States
- Nearest city: Medina, North Dakota
- Coordinates: 46°50′42″N 99°17′35″W
- Area: 160 acres (65 ha)
- Established: May 10, 1939
- Governing body: U.S. Fish and Wildlife Service

The Half-Way Lake National Wildlife Refuge is located in the U.S. state of North Dakota and consists of 160 acres (0.65 km^{2}). The refuge is a "limited-interest" refuge, which is privately owned easement refuge, managed by the U.S. Fish and Wildlife Service. The refuge is closed to the public and was established to protect habitat for migratory bird species and other animal life. Chase Lake Wetland Management District oversees the refuge, which in turn is a part of the Arrowwood National Wildlife Refuge Complex.

This is a limited-interest national wildlife refuge. The FWS has an easement on private property allowing it to manage wildlife habitat, but the land remains private property. There is no public access except from adjacent public roads. Limited-interest refuges were created in the 1930s and 1940s in response to declining waterfowl populations and the need to get people back to work during the Great Depression. Many landowners sold easements allowing the federal government to regulate water levels and restrict hunting.
