= Chase Lake Wetland Management District =

Conservation district in North Dakota, United States

- IUCN category IV (habitat/species management area)
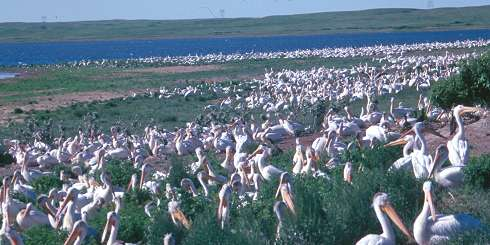
- White pelicans at Chase Lake Wetland Management District

- Location within the United States
- Location: North Dakota, United States
- Nearest city: Medina, ND
- Coordinates: 47°1′32″N 99°17′26″W
- Area: 140,000 acres (570 km^{2})
- Established: 1993
- Governing body: U.S. Fish and Wildlife Service
- Website: Chase Lake Wetland Management District

Chase Lake Wetland Management District is located in the U.S. state of North Dakota around Chase Lake. The district is located in what is known as the Prairie Pothole Region of lakes and ponds, which were left behind by the retreat of glaciers at the end of the last ice age. It was established in 1993.

== Administration ==
140,000 acres (570 km^{2}) are administered as the Chase Lake Wetland Management District. Of this, 44,000 acres (180 km^{2}) are actively conserved through 136 waterfowl production areas.

The waterfowl production areas, Wildlife Development Areas, wetland easements (private land managed by the government), grassland easements, and the easement refuge known as Halfway Lake National Wildlife Refuge, are managed by the district. The district is a part of the Arrowwood National Wildlife Refuge Complex.

== Ecology ==
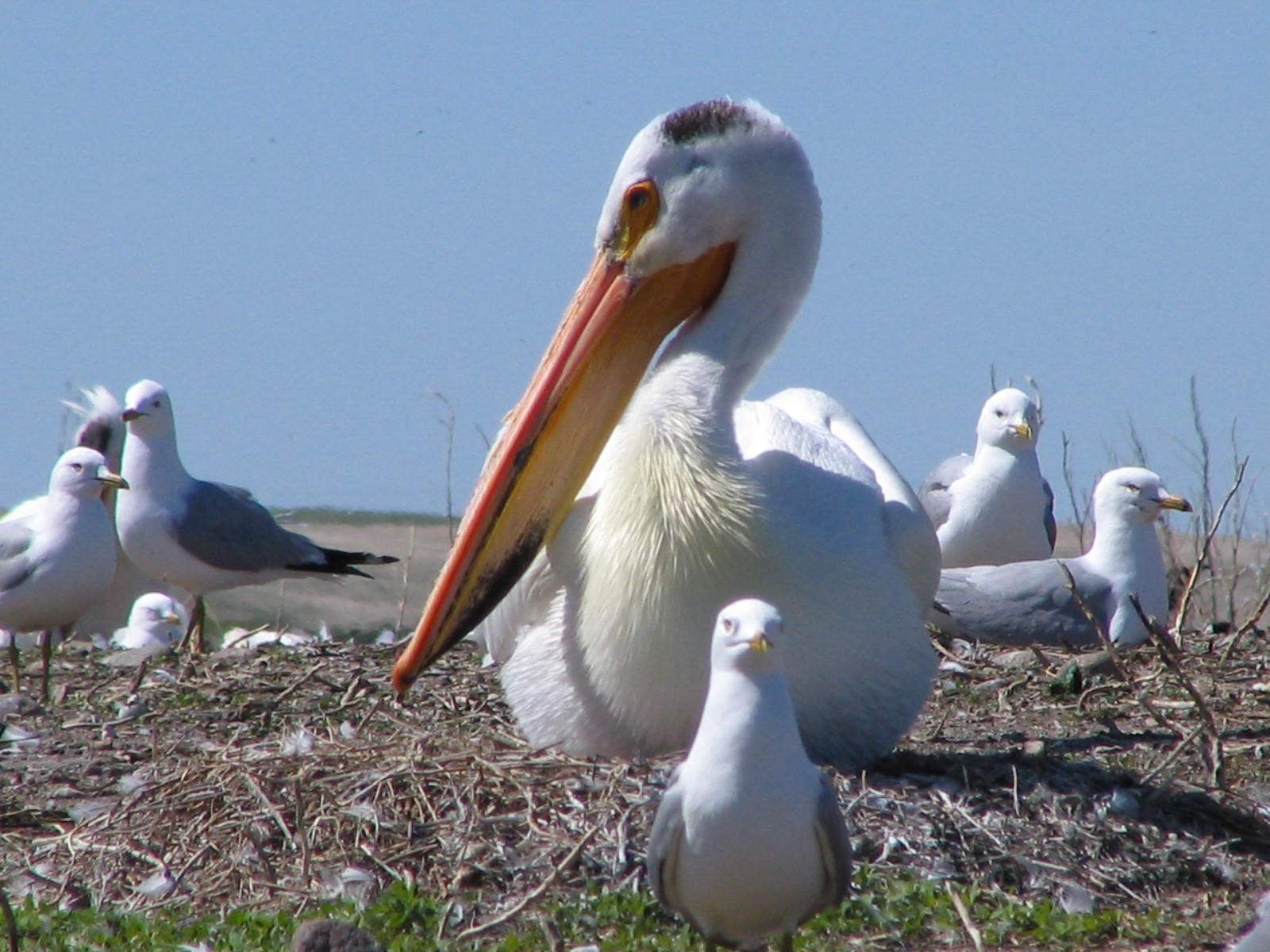
Pelican and Gulls at Chase Lake NWR

In the district, hundreds of thousands of birds either migrate through the region or stay and nest every year. Important waterfowl include the American white pelican whose numbers in the district are higher than in any other protected region in North America. Tundra swans, canada geese, bitterns, wood ducks, black-crowned night herons, pintails, Franklin's gull and the great blue heron are but a sampling of the 250 species of birds that have been identified on the refuge. White-tailed deer, muskrat, beaver, raccoon and skunk are but a few of the 40 mammal species that have been documented.

== Recreation ==
The district permits hunting and fishing within regulations, and proceeds from Duck Stamps sold to duck hunters are used to manage existing protected areas, as well as purchase additional lands from willing private landowners.
