= Sibley Lake National Wildlife Refuge =

- IUCN category IV (habitat/species management area)
- Location within the United States
- Location: Griggs County, North Dakota, United States
- Nearest city: Cooperstown, North Dakota
- Coordinates: 47°31′18″N 98°20′46″W
- Area: 1,077 acres (436 ha)
- Elevation: 1,463 feet (446 m)
- Governing body: U.S. Fish and Wildlife Service

The Sibley Lake National Wildlife Refuge is located in the U.S. state of North Dakota and consists of 1,077 acres (4.35 km^{2}). Sibley Lake is a privately owned easement refuge, managed with by the U.S. Fish and Wildlife Service. The refuge was established to protect habitat for migratory bird species, white-tail deer, and other mammals. The refuge contains a 525-acre (2.12 km^{2}) fresh water marsh that provides excellent migratory bird habitat. Valley City Wetland Management District oversees the refuge, which in turn is a part of the Arrowwood National Wildlife Refuge Complex.
