= Stoney Slough National Wildlife Refuge =

Protected area in North Dakota, United States

- IUCN category IV (habitat/species management area)
- Location within the United States
- Location: Barnes County, North Dakota, United States
- Nearest city: Valley City, North Dakota
- Coordinates: 46°43′31.0801″N 98°7′26.1048″W
- Area: 2,000 acres (810 ha)
- Established: February 3, 1941
- Governing body: U.S. Fish and Wildlife Service

Stoney Slough National Wildlife Refuge is a 2,000-acre (810 ha) easement refuge with 1,120 acres (450 ha) owned in fee title and the remaining area of 880 acres (360 ha) covered by easement. The United States Fish and Wildlife Service fee title of 1,120 acres allows some wetland and upland management. The wetland areas on the Refuge cover approximately 600 acres (240 ha) in four permanent pools and two temporary pools. Water management using a series of canals and a water control structure is possible when there is sufficient spring runoff. The Refuge is a popular stopover for snow geese and white-fronted geese during fall migration.

The refuge was established by Executive Orders during the Franklin D. Roosevelt administration and was set aside as "a refuge and breeding grounds for migratory birds and other wildlife". The refuge is maintained by the Valley City Wetland Management District and is a part of the Arrowwood National Wildlife Refuge Complex.

Stoney Slough NWR is located approximately 13 miles (21 km) south and 4 miles (6.4 km) west of Valley City, North Dakota and can be reached via Highway 1 South. Potential wildlife observation and photography opportunities are available from roads adjacent to and through the Refuge.

== See also ==
- List of National Wildlife Refuges
