= Johnson Lake National Wildlife Refuge =

Protected area in North Dakota, United States

- Location within the United States
- Location: Eddy / Nelson counties, North Dakota, USA
- Nearest city: New Rockford, ND
- Coordinates: 47°40′59″N 98°31′24″W
- Area: 2,002 acres (810 ha)
- Established: May 10, 1939
- Governing body: U.S. Fish and Wildlife Service

Johnson Lake National Wildlife Refuge is located in the U.S. state of North Dakota. The Refuge was established by Executive Order 8122, signed on May 10, 1939 by President Franklin D. Roosevelt to be set aside as "a refuge and breeding grounds for migratory birds and other wildlife."

Johnson Lake National Wildlife Refuge is a part of the Arrowwood National Wildlife Refuge Complex, and is managed by the U.S. Fish and Wildlife Service. The refuge is privately owned under a conservation easement which allows the U.S. Government to enforce federal laws regarding refuge protection statutes. The refuge is not open to the public, but nearby roads permit some wildlife viewing from a distance.

More than a dozen species of ducks and wading birds have been documented. The most interesting waterfowl usually seen include the Canada geese, snow geese, tundra swans.

Mammals such as white-tailed deer are common, especially in the winter.

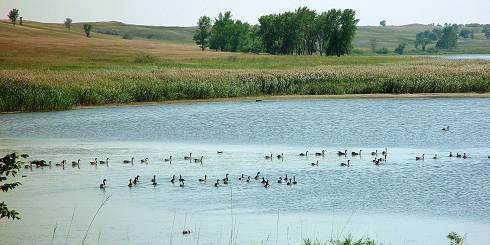
Canada geese on a wetland lake
