= Chase Lake Prairie Project =

Waterfowl recovery project in North Dakota, US

- IUCN category IV (habitat/species management area)
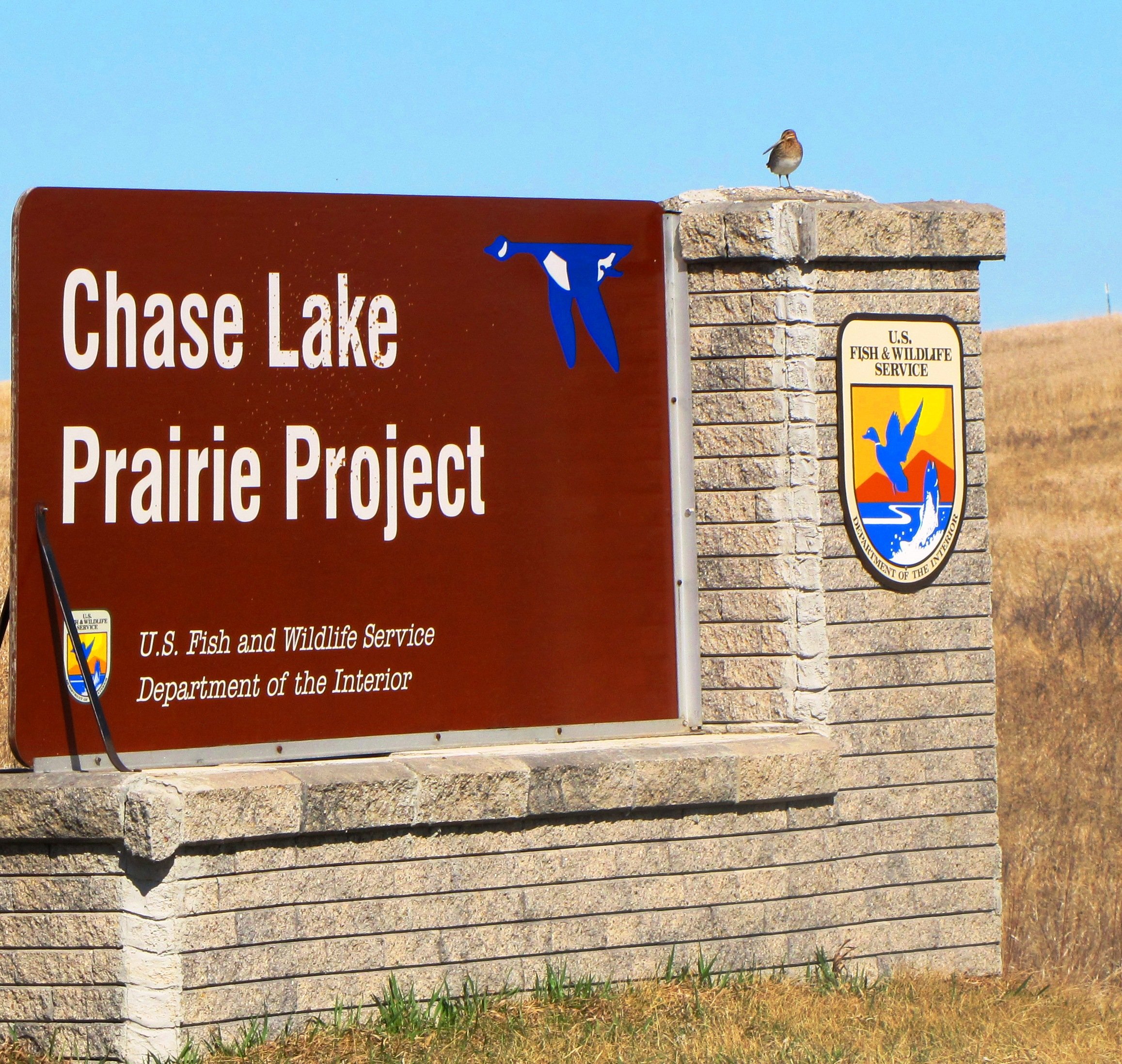

- Location within the United States
- Location: North Dakota, USA
- Nearest city: Medina, ND
- Coordinates: 47°1′32″N 99°17′26″W
- Area: 5,500,000 acres (22,000 km^{2})
- Established: May 1989
- Governing body: U.S. Fish and Wildlife Service
- Website: Chase Lake Prairie Project

The Chase Lake Prairie Project is considered the "National Flagship Project" of the North American Waterfowl Management Plan (NAWMP). The goal is to rehabilitate 5,500,000 acres (2,200,000 ha) of wetland around Chase Lake on the Missouri Coteau. The project was dedicated in September 1989.

== Background ==
During the 1980s, the destruction of wetlands in the region had greatly reduced the available wetland habitat, adversely impacting the populations of dozens of species of birds. The United States and Canada jointly signed the NAWMP in 1986, in an effort to collaboratively work to restore lost and damaged wetlands. The Prairie Pothole Joint Venture was commenced in 1987 to protect the Prairie Pothole Region in North Dakota, South Dakota, Montana, Minnesota and Iowa.

== Project goals ==
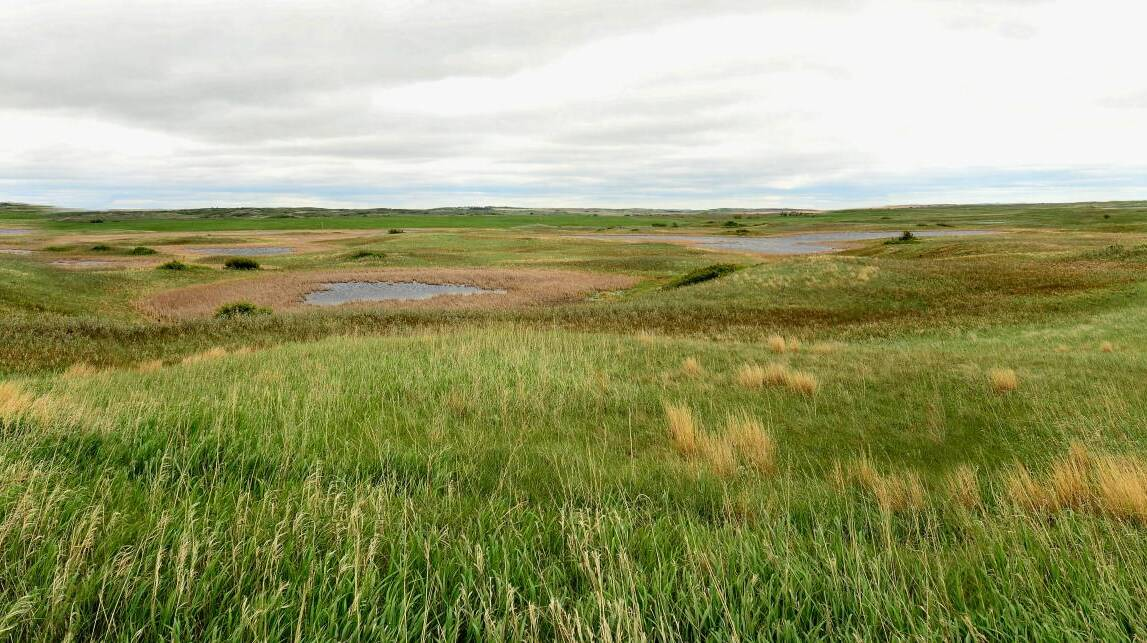
Wetland complex, south side of Chase Lake Prairie Project headquarters

The project is an effort to ensure future protection of the region, whereby ranchers and farmers agree to utilize native grasses when planting, rotate cattle regularly to prevent overgrazing, restore wetland environments that have been drained and prevent over hunting and predation from mammals such as the coyote and fox.

As of 2005, over 2,000 wetland basins had been set aside, restored, or easements were signed to ensure habitat protection in an ongoing effort to restore the region to as natural a state as possible, while ensuring farmers and ranchers productivity is minimally impacted.

As of 2019, the project is still active.
