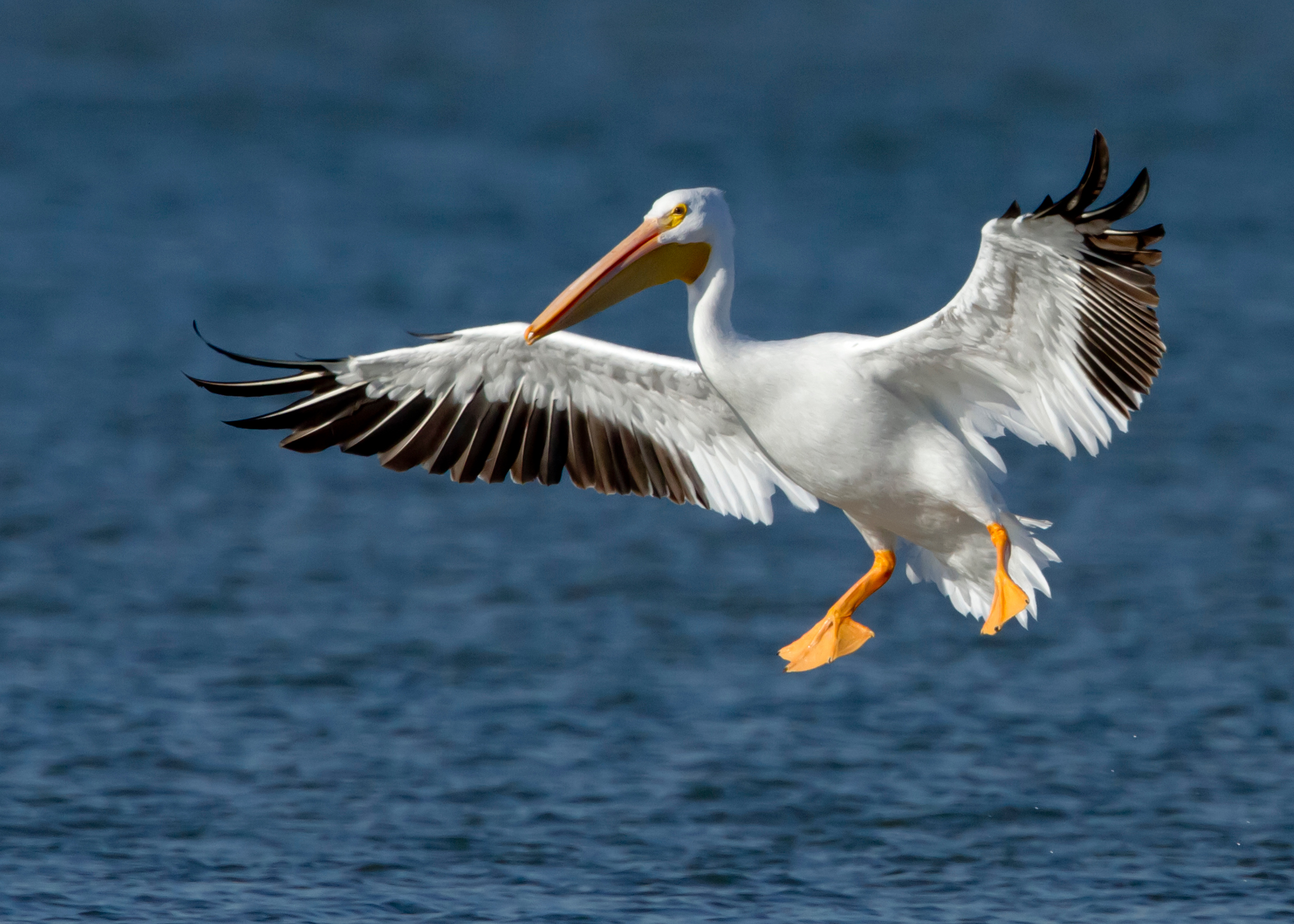
- Flying in Dallas, USA

Conservation status
- Least Concern (IUCN 3.1)

- Apparently Secure (NatureServe)

Scientific classification
- Kingdom: Animalia
- Phylum: Chordata
- Class: Aves
- Order: Pelecaniformes
- Family: Pelecanidae
- Genus: Pelecanus
- Species: P. erythrorhynchos

Binomial name
- Pelecanus erythrorhynchos Gmelin, 1789
- Breeding Migration Year-round Nonbreeding

Synonyms
- Pelecanus erythrorhynchus (lapsus)

= American white pelican =

Species of bird

The American white pelican (Pelecanus erythrorhynchos) is a large aquatic soaring bird from the order Pelecaniformes. It breeds in interior North America, moving south and to the coasts, as far as Costa Rica, in winter.

== Taxonomy ==
The American white pelican was formally described in 1789 by the German naturalist Johann Friedrich Gmelin in his revised and expanded edition of Carl Linnaeus's Systema Naturae. He placed it with the other pelicans in the genus Pelecanus. He coined the binomial name Pelecanus erythrorhynchos. Gmelin based his description on the "rough-billed pelican" that had been described in 1785 by the English ornithologist John Latham. Latham had access to three specimens that had been brought to London from New York and the Hudson Bay area of North America. The scientific name means "red-billed pelican", from the Latin term for a pelican, Pelecanus, and erythrorhynchos, derived from the Ancient Greek words erythros (ἐρυθρός) 'red' + rhynchos (ῥύγχος) 'bill'. The species is monotypic: no subspecies are recognised.

== Description ==
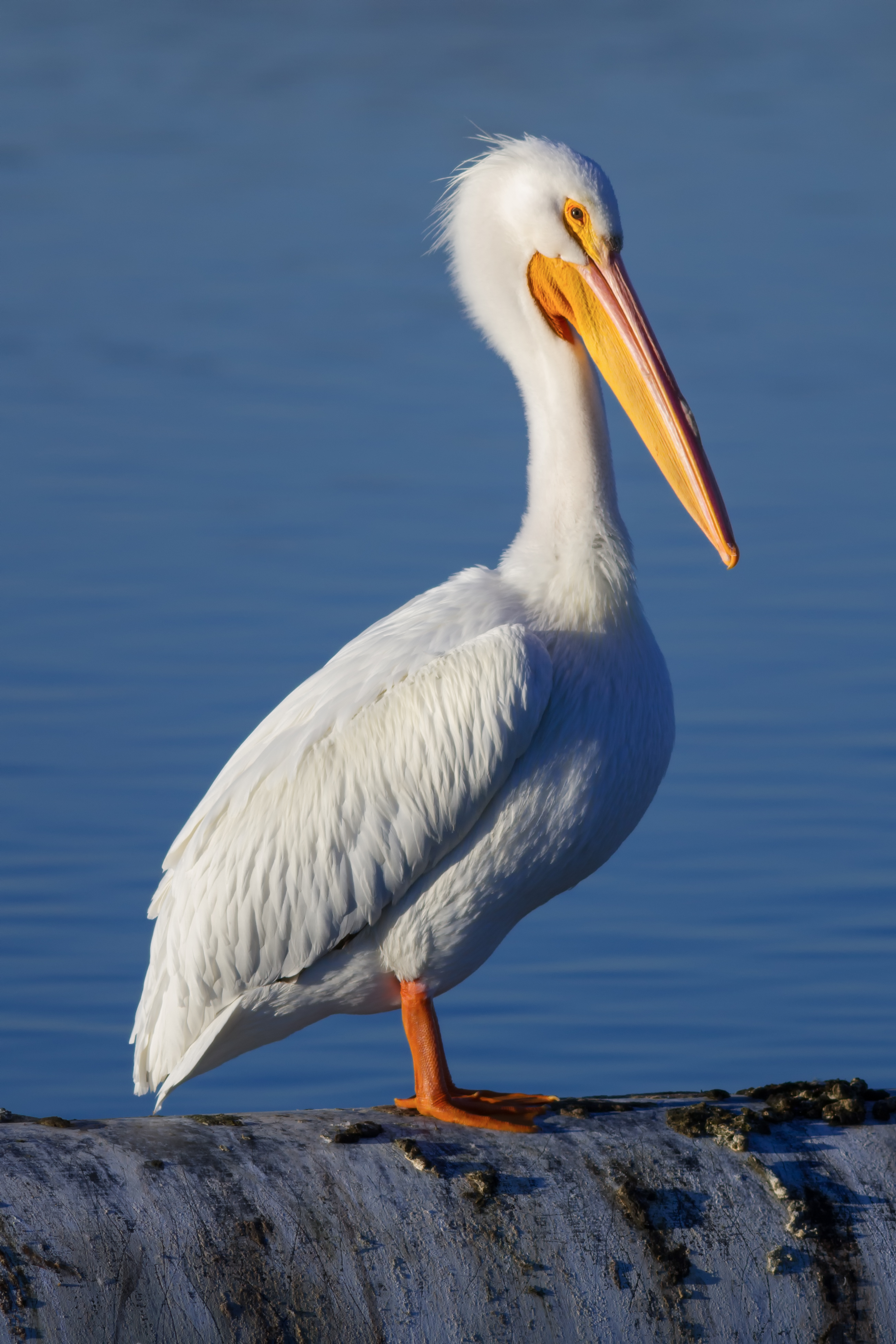
Adult non-breeding in Marin County, California. Note the lack of "horn" and duller bare parts.

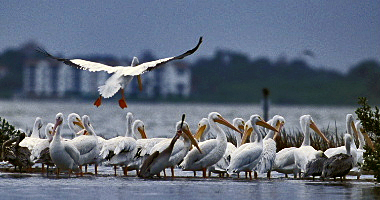
American white pelicans gathering at Pelican Island National Wildlife Refuge in Florida. Brown pelicans can also be seen in the center, and at the left and right margins.

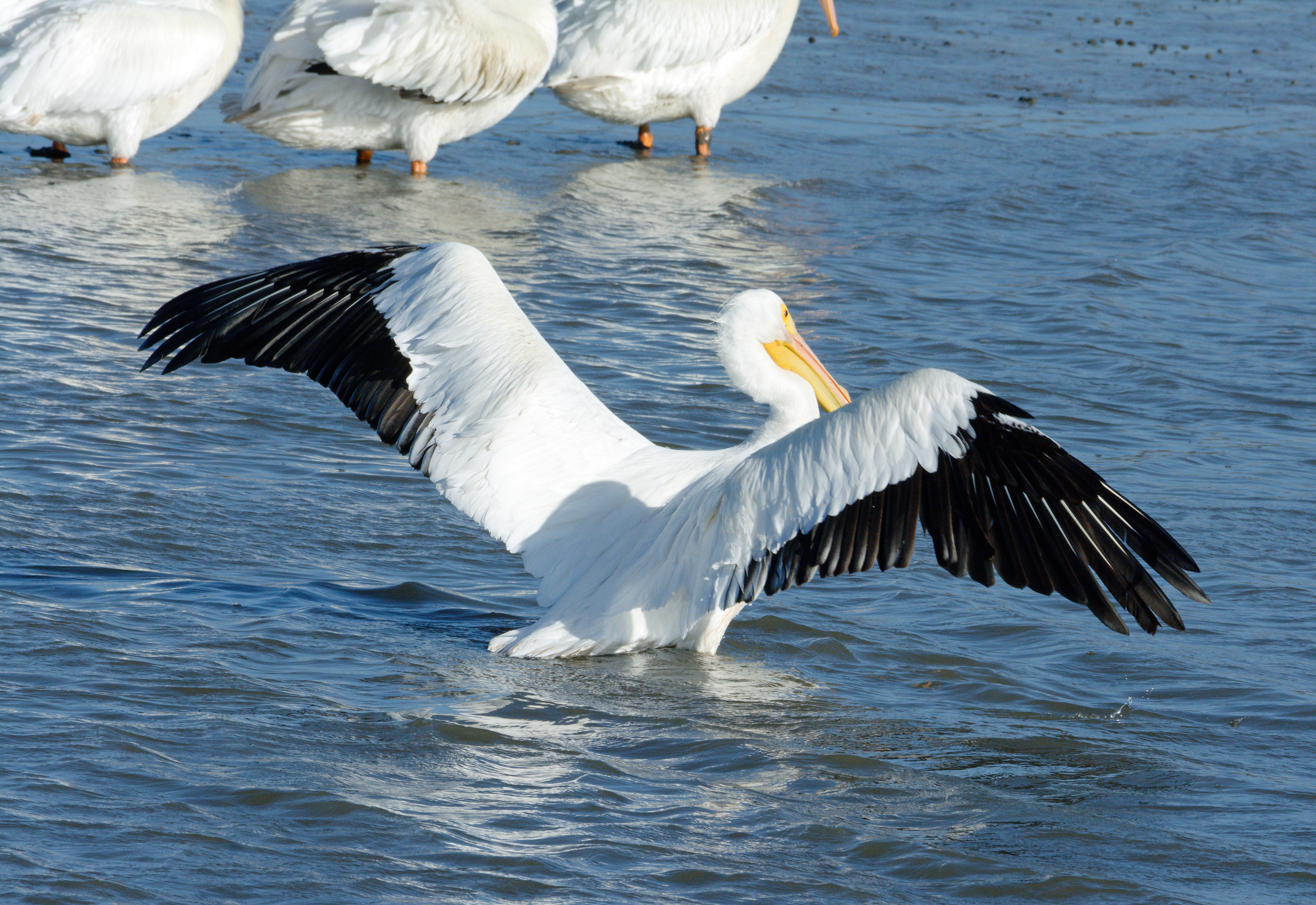
With wings spread, showing black remiges

The American white pelican rivals the trumpeter swan, with a similar overall length, as one of the longest birds native to North America. Both very large and plump, it has an overall length of about 50–70 in (130–180 cm), courtesy of the huge beak which measures 11.3–15.2 in (290–390 mm) in males and 10.3–14.2 in (260–360 mm) in females. It has a wingspan of about 95–120 in (240–300 cm). The species also has the second-largest average wingspan of any North American bird, after the California condor. This large wingspan allows the bird to use soaring flight for migration easily. Body weight can range between 7.7 and 30 lb (3.5 and 13.6 kg), although typically these birds average between 11 and 20 lb (5.0 and 9.1 kg). One mean body mass of 15.4 lb (7.0 kg) was reported. Another study found mean weights to be somewhat lower than expected, with eleven males averaging 13.97 lb (6.34 kg) and six females averaging 10.95 lb (4.97 kg). Among standard measurements, the wing chord measures 20–26.7 in (51–68 cm) and the tarsus measures 3.9–5.4 in (9.9–13.7 cm) long. The plumage is almost entirely bright white, except for the black primary and secondary remiges, which are hardly visible except in flight. From early spring until after breeding has finished in mid-late summer, the breast feathers have a yellowish hue. After molting into the eclipse plumage, the upper head often has a grey hue, as blackish feathers grow between the small wispy white crest.

The bill is huge and flat on the top, with a large throat sac below, and, in the breeding season, is vivid orange in color, as is the bare skin around the eye and the feet. Iris coloration depends upon age and season, ranging from bright white to hazel to blue-gray. In the breeding season, both sexes grow a laterally flattened keratinous "horn" on the upper bill, located about one-third the bill's length behind the tip. This is the only one of the eight species of pelican to have a bill "horn". The horn is shed after the birds mate and lay their eggs. Outside the breeding season, the bare parts become duller in color, with the naked facial skin yellow and the bill, pouch, and feet a dull pink-orange.

Apart from the difference in size, males and females look exactly alike. Immature birds have light grey plumage with a darker brownish nape and remiges. Their bare parts are dull grey. Chicks are naked at first, then grow white down feathers all over, before molting to the immature plumage.

== Distribution and ecology ==
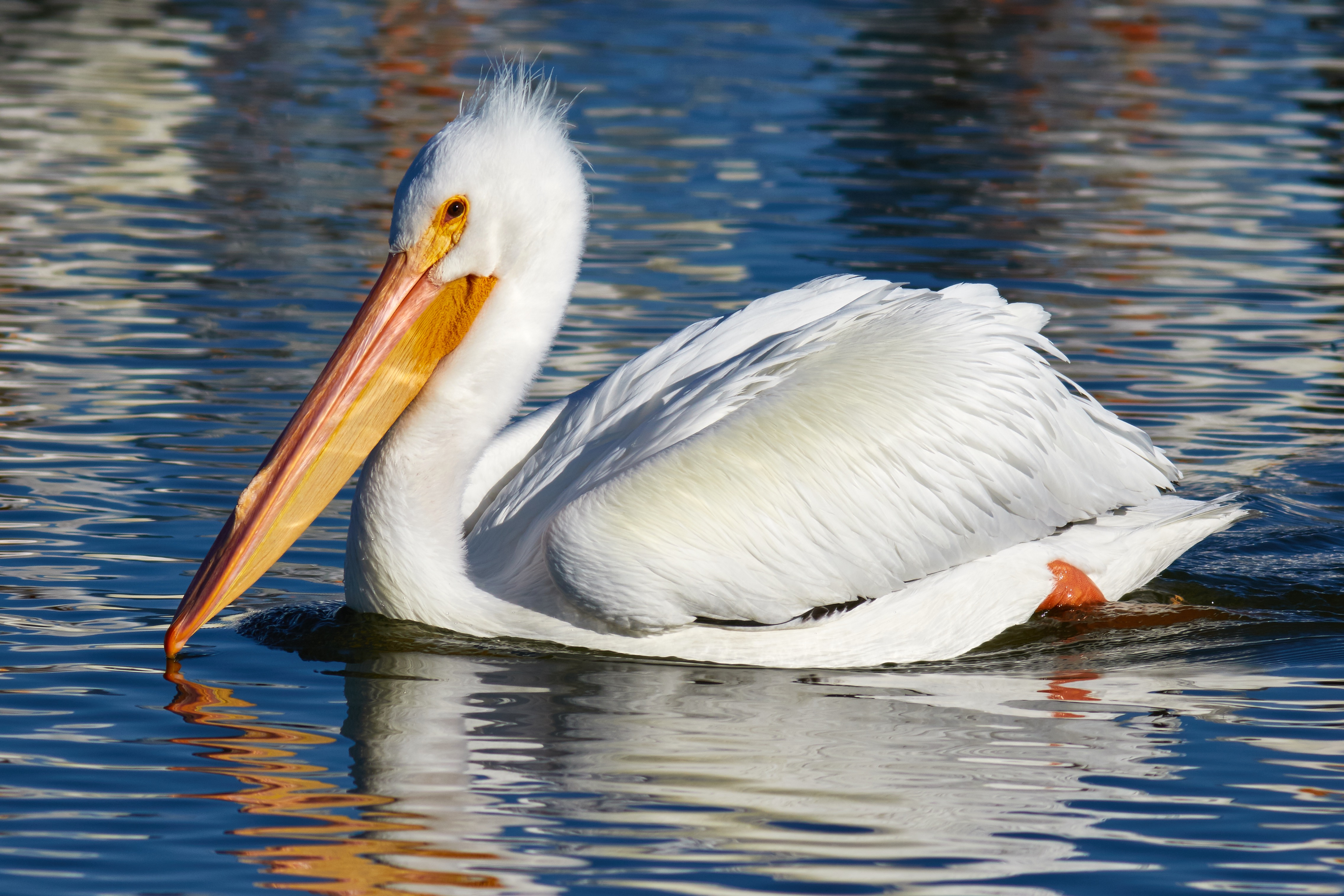
Non-breeding adult wintering in California

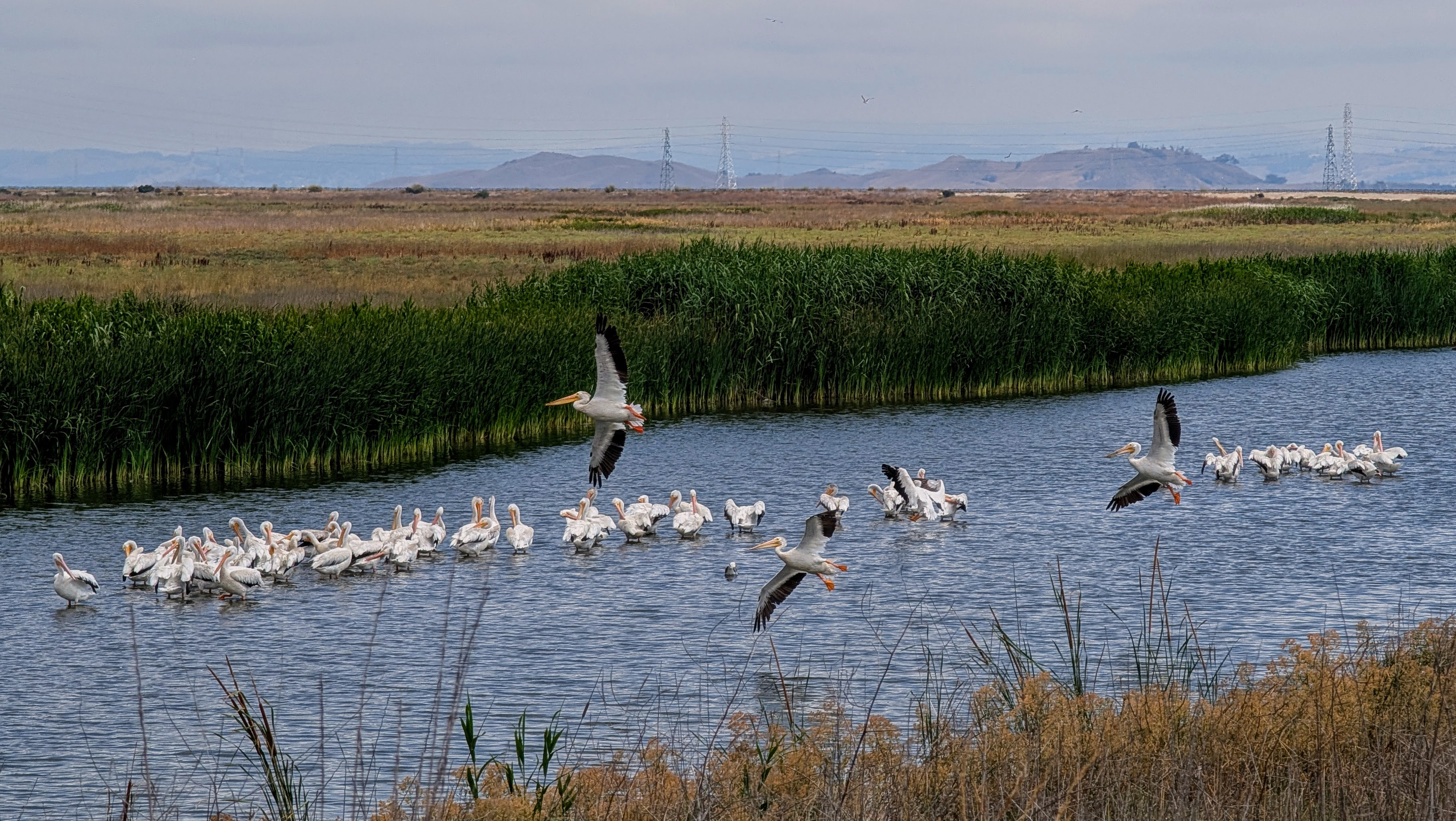
Summer at Palo Alto Baylands

American white pelicans nest in colonies of several hundred pairs on islands in remote brackish and freshwater lakes of inland North America. The most northerly nesting colony can be found on islands in the rapids of the Slave River between Fort Fitzgerald, Alberta and Fort Smith, Northwest Territories. Several groups have been visiting the bird sanctuary at Useless Bay in the state of Washington since 2015. About 10–20% of the population uses Gunnison Island in the Great Basin's Great Salt Lake as a nesting ground. The southernmost colonies are in southeastern Ontario and western Nevada.

Approximately 180,000 American white pelicans, which is 40% of the global population, migrate to Canada each spring to breed, nesting from the coast of British Columbia east to Lake of the Woods and Lake Nipigon in Ontario. Of this large number of pelicans, Manitoba holds half. Although seen in numerous regions of the province, including cities, nesting colonies concentrate in Manitoba's three largest bodies of water, Lakes Winnipeg, Manitoba, and Winnipegosis. American white pelicans are a conservation priority in Canada, where efforts are focused on population monitoring and habitat protection. "Large increases have occurred in all Canadian Bird Conservation Regions that host the species and for which there are reasonably reliable results."

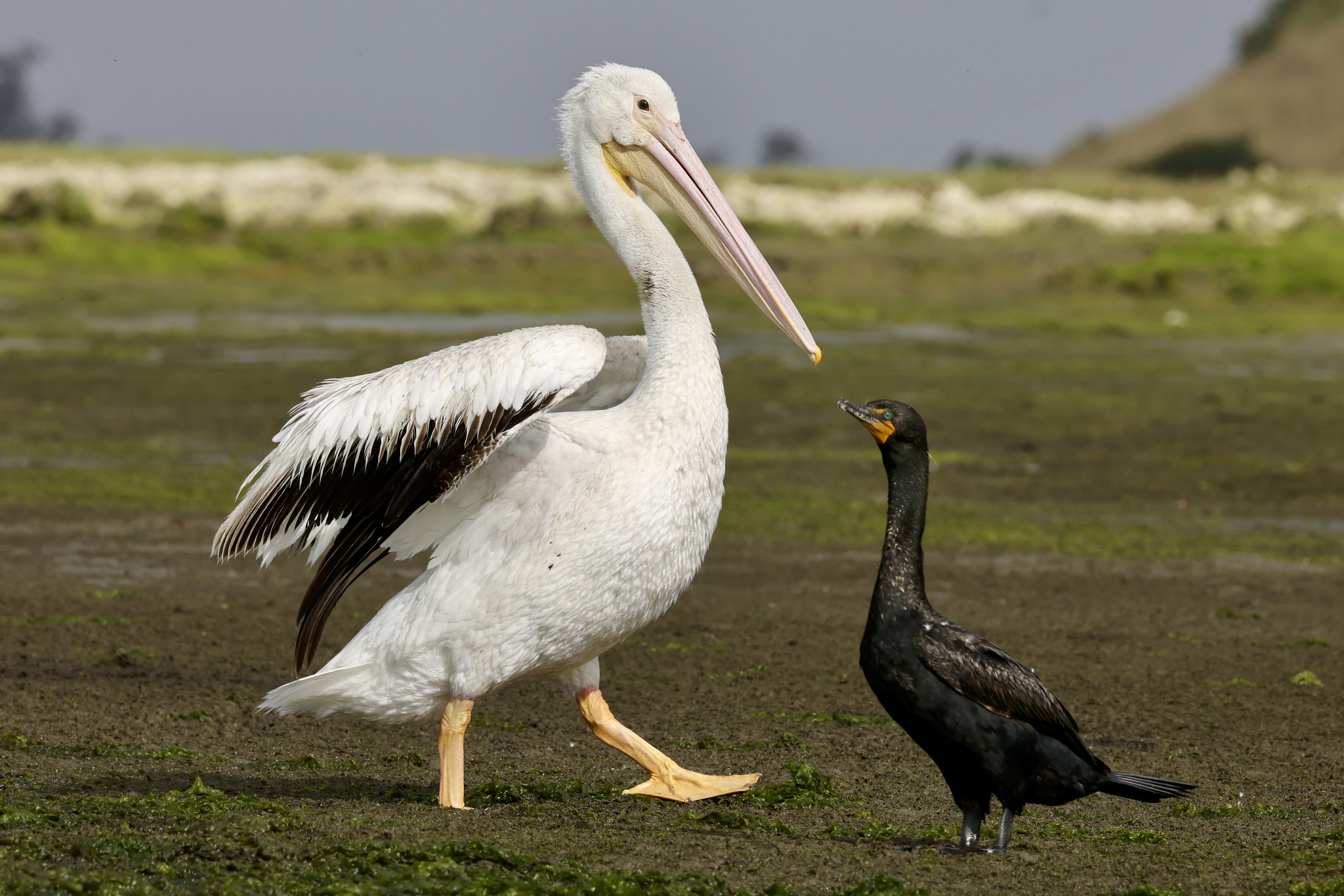
With a double-crested cormorant, in Monterey County, California

They winter on the Pacific and Gulf of Mexico coasts from central California and Florida south to Costa Rica, and along the Mississippi River at least as far north as St. Paul, Minnesota. In winter quarters, they are rarely found on the open seashore, preferring estuaries, bays, and lakes. They cross deserts and mountains but avoid the open ocean on migration. But stray birds, often blown off course by hurricanes, have been seen in the Caribbean. In Colombian territory, it was recorded first on February 22, 1997, on the San Andrés Island, where they might have been swept by Hurricane Marco, which passed nearby in November 1996. Since then, there have also been a few observations likely to pertain to this species on the Colombian mainland, for example, at Calamar.

Wild American white pelicans may live for more than 16 years. In captivity, the record lifespan stands at over 34 years.

=== Food and feeding ===
American white pelicans fishing in a group near Corte Madera, California

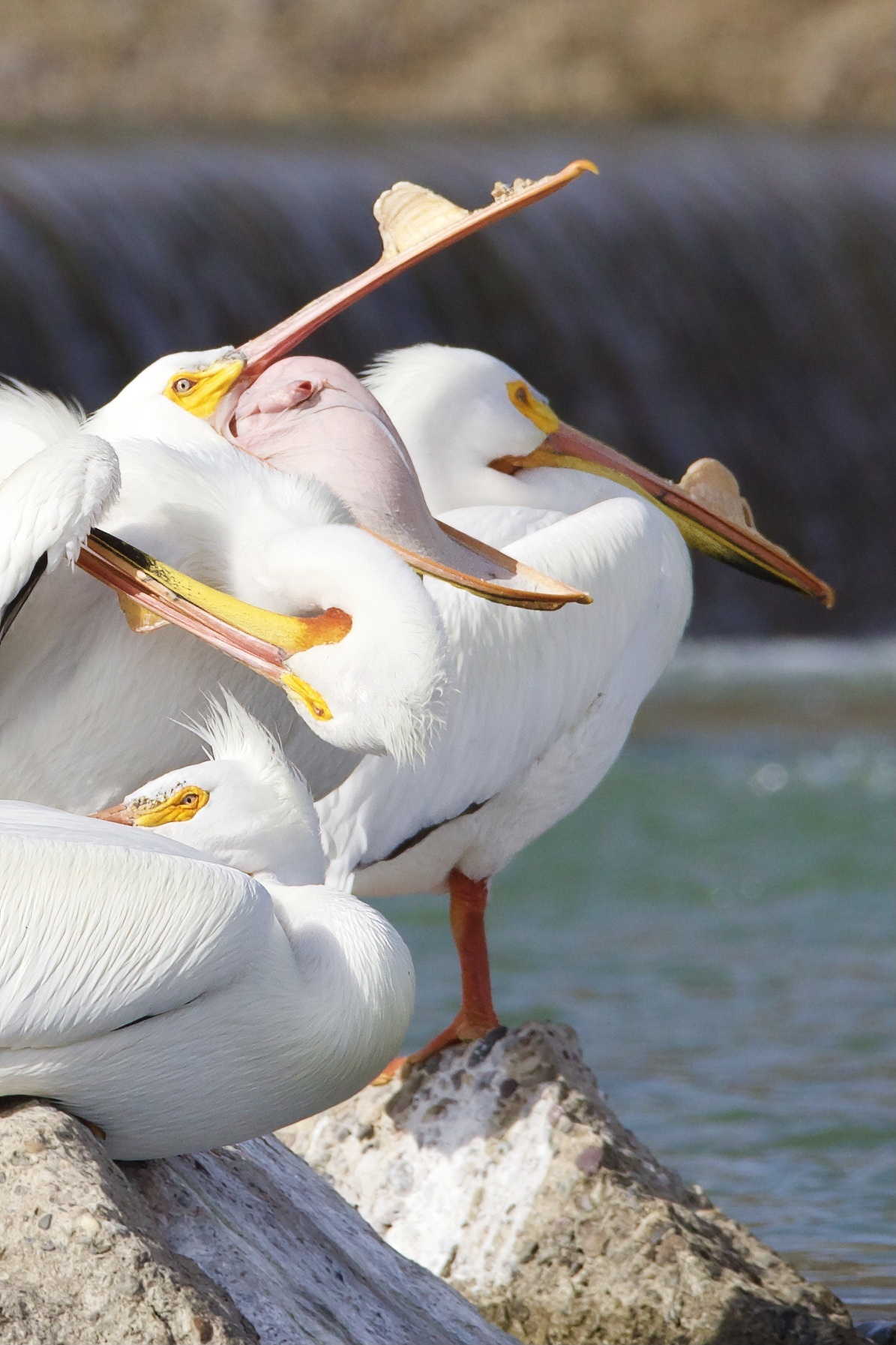
Male showing glottis exposure, in Alberta

Unlike the brown pelican (P. occidentalis), the American white pelican does not dive for its food. Instead, it catches its prey while swimming. Each bird eats more than four pounds (1.8 kg) of food a day. The fish taken by pelicans can range from the size of minnows to 3.5-pound pickerels. Typical fish prey include Cypriniformes like common carp (Cyprinus carpio), Lahontan tui chub (Gila bicolor obesa), minnows, and shiners. Perciformes like Sacramento perch (Archoplites interruptus) or yellow perch (Perca flavescens), Salmoniformes like rainbow trout (Oncorhynchus mykiss) and salmon, Siluriformes (catfish), and jackfish. Other animals eaten by these birds are crayfish, amphibians, and sometimes larval salamanders. Birds nesting on saline lakes, where food is scarce, will travel great distances to better feeding grounds.

American white pelicans like to gather in groups of a dozen or more to feed, as they can thus cooperate and corral fish for one another. When this is not easily possible – for example, in deep water, where fish can escape by diving out of reach – they prefer to forage alone. But the birds also steal food on occasion from other birds, a practice known as kleptoparasitism. White pelicans are known to steal fish from other pelicans, gulls, and cormorants from the surface of the water and, in one case, from a great blue heron while both large birds were in flight.

=== Reproduction ===
As noted above, they are colonial breeders, with up to 10,000 pairs per site. The birds arrive on the breeding grounds in March or April; nesting starts between early April and early June. During the breeding season, both males and females develop a pronounced bump on the top of their large beaks. This conspicuous growth is shed by the end of the breeding season.

The nest is a shallow depression scraped in the ground, into which some twigs, sticks, reeds, or similar debris have been gathered. After about one week of courtship and nest-building, the female lays a clutch of usually two or three eggs, sometimes just one, sometimes up to six.

Both parents incubate for about one month. The young leave the nest 3–4 weeks after hatching; at this point, usually only one young per nest has survived. They spend the following month in a creche or "pod", molting into immature plumage and eventually learning to fly. After fledging, the parents care for their offspring for some three more weeks, until the close family bond separates in late summer or early fall, and the birds gather in larger groups on rich feeding grounds in preparation for the migration to the winter quarters. They migrate south by September or October.

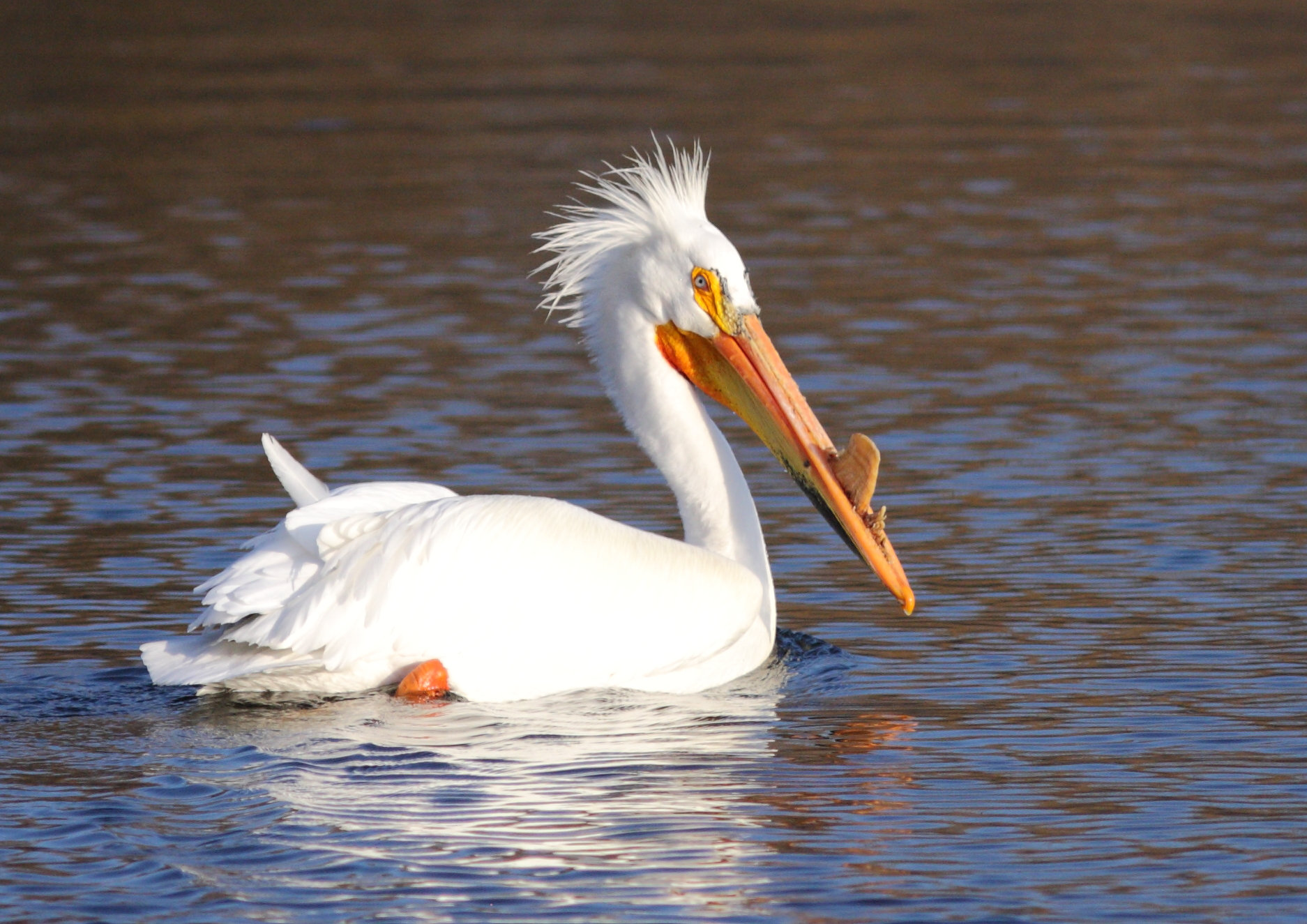
American white pelican (breeding) in Green Bay, WI, 2013

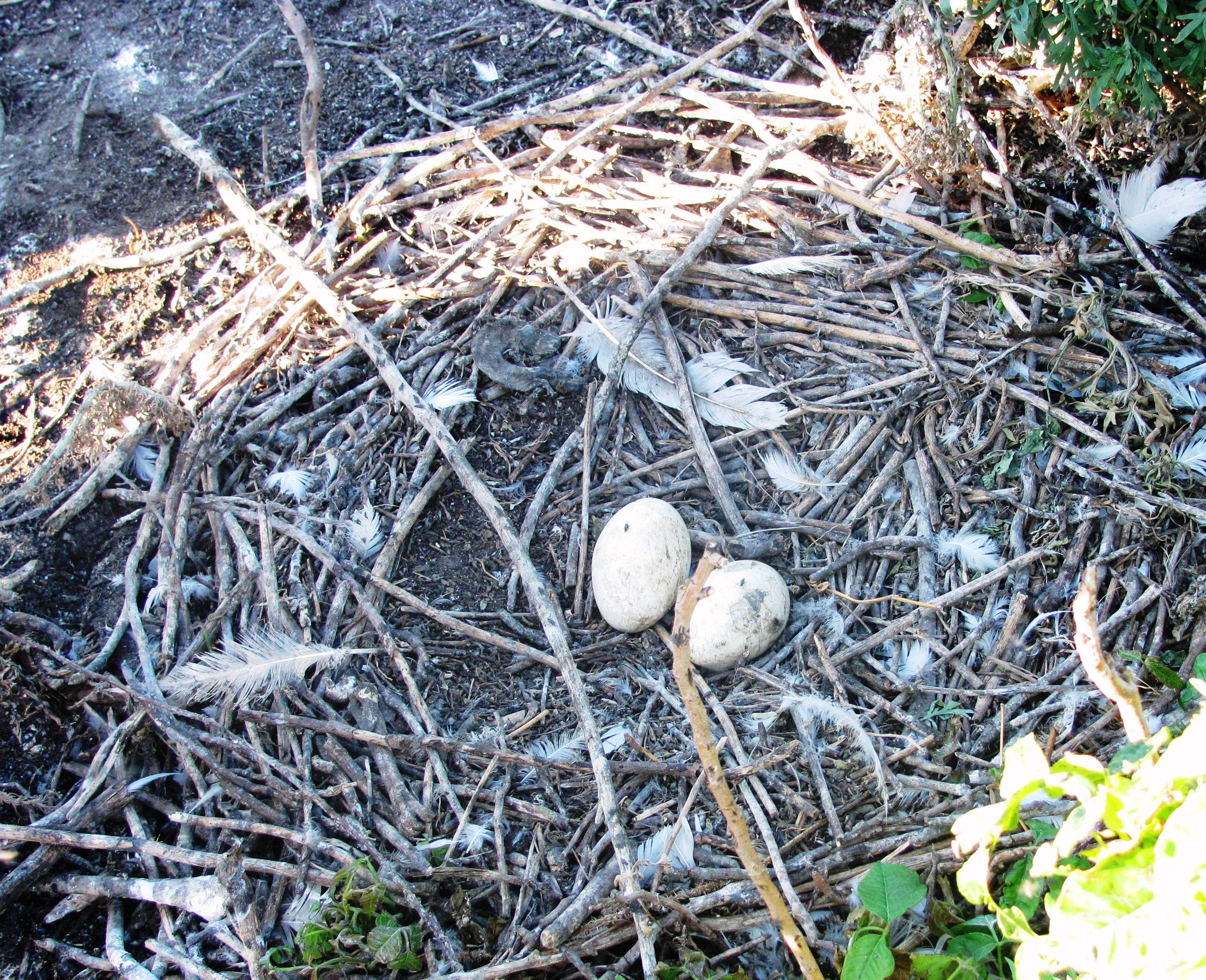
Nest at Chase Lake

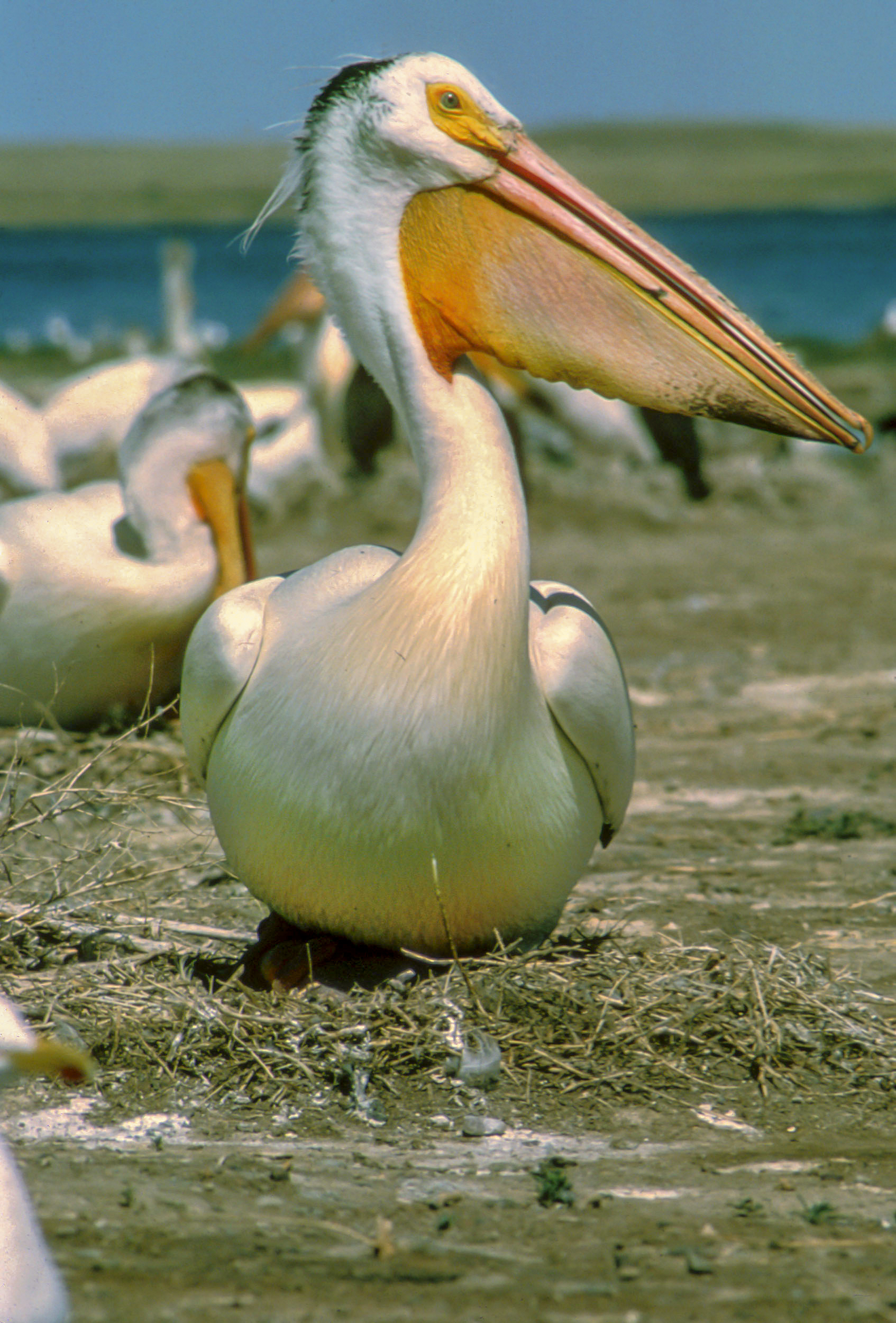
Adults on their nests, already in nonbreeding plumage (note dark nape)

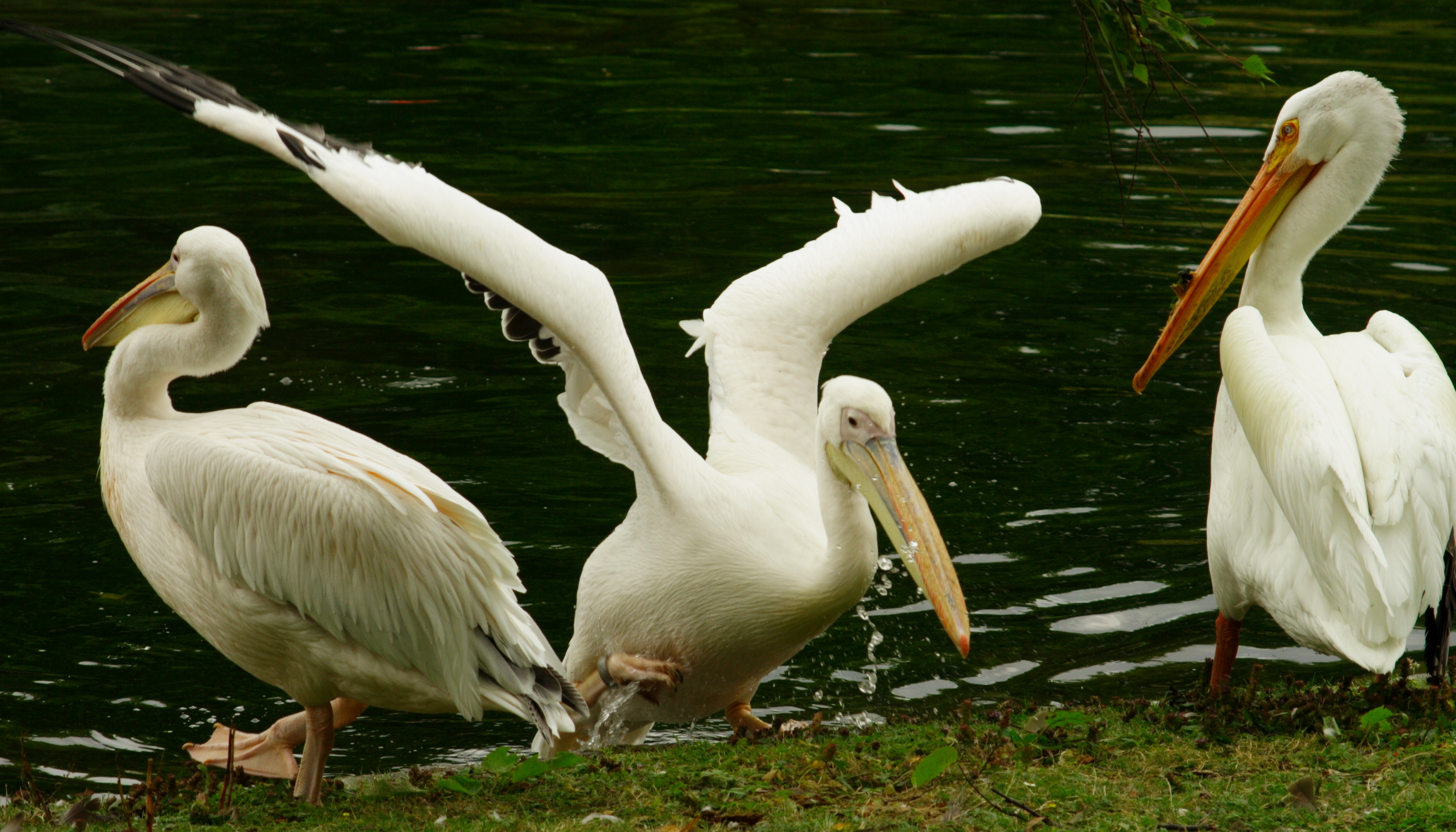
A captive American white pelican (right) alongside two great white pelicans (Pelecanus onocrotalus) in St James's Park, London (note the damaged 'horn')

=== Predation ===
Occasionally, these pelicans may nest in colonies on isolated islands, which is believed to reduce the likelihood of mammalian predation significantly. Red foxes and coyotes prey upon colonies that they can access, and several gulls have been known to prey on pelican eggs and nestlings (including herring, ring-billed, and California gull), as well as common ravens. Young pelicans may be hunted by great horned owls, red-tailed hawks, bald eagles, and golden eagles. The pelicans respond differently to mammalian threats than to avian threats. Though fairly approachable while feeding, the pelicans may temporarily abandon their nests if a human gets too close to the colony. If the threat is another bird, however, the pelicans do not abandon the nest and may fight off the interloper by jabbing at it with their considerable bills. Full-grown pelicans have few predators. Only red foxes and coyotes are known to prey on nesting adults on rare occasions.

=== Status and conservation ===
This species is protected by the Migratory Bird Treaty Act of 1918. It has the California Department of Fish and Game protective status California species of special concern (CSC). On a global scale, however, the species is common enough to qualify as a Species of Least Concern according to the IUCN.

Habitat loss is the largest known cause of nesting failure, with flooding and drought being recurrent problems. Human-related losses include entanglement in fishing gear, boating disturbance, and poaching as well as additional habitat degradation.

There was a pronounced decline in American white pelican numbers in the mid-20th century, attributable to the excessive spraying of DDT, endrin, and other organochlorides in agriculture as well as widespread draining and pollution of wetlands. But populations have recovered well after stricter environmental protection laws came into effect, and are stable or slightly increasing today. By the 1980s, more than 100,000 adult American white pelicans were estimated to exist in the wild, with 33,000 nests altogether in the 50 colonies in Canada, and 18,500 nests in the 14–17 United States colonies. Shoreline erosion at breeding colonies remains a problem in some cases, as are the occasional mass poisonings when pesticides are used near breeding or wintering sites.
