= Pingree, North Dakota =

- City
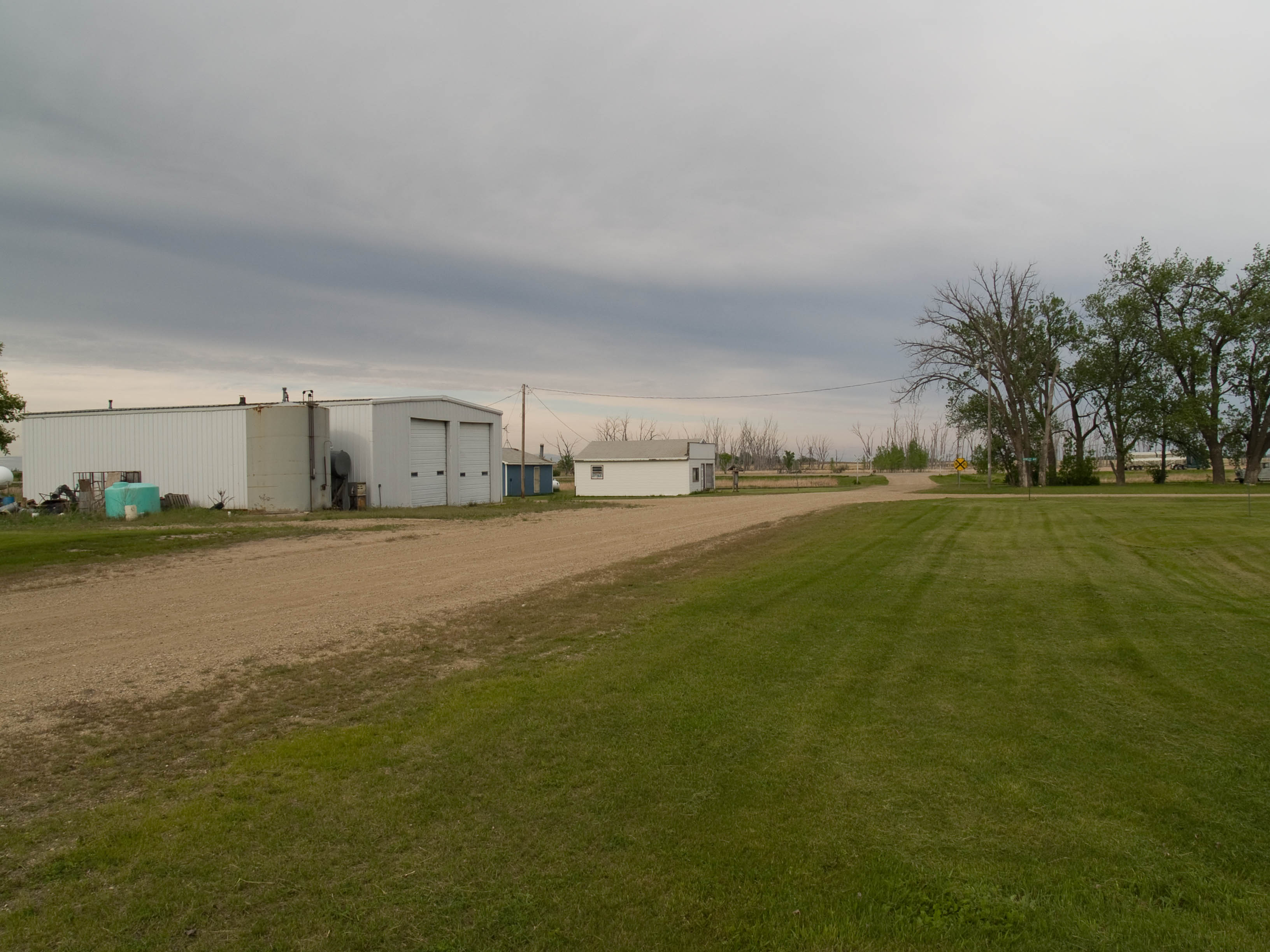
- Street in Pingree

- Coordinates: 47°09′50″N 98°54′31″W
- Country: United States
- State: North Dakota
- County: Stutsman
- Founded: 1882

Area
  - Total: 0.19 sq mi (0.50 km^{2})
  - Land: 0.19 sq mi (0.50 km^{2})
  - Water: 0 sq mi (0.00 km^{2})
- Elevation: 1,558 ft (475 m)

Population (2020)
  - Total: 41
  - Estimate (2022): 43
  - Density: 213.0/sq mi (82.23/km^{2})
- Time zone: UTC-6 (Central (CST))
  - Summer (DST): UTC-5 (CDT)
- ZIP code: 58476
- Area code: 701
- FIPS code: 38-62620
- GNIS feature ID: 1036222

Pingree is a city in Stutsman County, North Dakota, United States. The population was 41 at the 2020 census. Pingree was founded in 1882.

== History ==
A post office called Pingree was established in 1882, and remained in operation until 1993. The city's name honors Hazen S. Pingree, Mayor of Detroit, Michigan.

== Geography ==
According to the United States Census Bureau, the city has a total area of 0.18 square miles (0.47 km^{2}), all land.

== Demographics ==
Historical population
Census	Pop.	Note	%±
1920	286		—
1930	266		−7.0%
1940	167		−37.2%
1950	161		−3.6%
1960	151		−6.2%
1970	76		−49.7%
1980	88		15.8%
1990	61		−30.7%
2000	66		8.2%
2010	60		−9.1%
2020	41		−31.7%
2022 (est.)	43		4.9%
U.S. Decennial Census; 2020 Census

=== 2010 census ===
As of the census of 2010, there were 60 people, 27 households, and 14 families residing in the city. The population density was 333.3 inhabitants per square mile (128.7/km^{2}). There were 29 housing units at an average density of 161.1 per square mile (62.2/km^{2}). The racial makeup of the city was 98.3% White and 1.7% from two or more races. Hispanic or Latino of any race were 5.0% of the population.

There were 27 households, of which 33.3% had children under the age of 18 living with them, 40.7% were married couples living together, 3.7% had a female householder with no husband present, 7.4% had a male householder with no wife present, and 48.1% were non-families. 44.4% of all households were made up of individuals, and 7.4% had someone living alone who was 65 years of age or older. The average household size was 2.22 and the average family size was 3.21.

The median age in the city was 33 years. 28.3% of residents were under the age of 18; 9.9% were between the ages of 18 and 24; 28.3% were from 25 to 44; 21.7% were from 45 to 64; and 11.7% were 65 years of age or older. The gender makeup of the city was 61.7% male and 38.3% female.

=== 2000 census ===
As of the census of 2000, there were 66 people, 26 households, and 21 families residing in the city. The population density was 367.9 inhabitants per square mile (142.0/km^{2}). There were 32 housing units at an average density of 178.4 per square mile (68.9/km^{2}). The racial makeup of the city was 98.48% White and 1.52% Asian.

There were 26 households, out of which 42.3% had children under the age of 18 living with them, 50.0% were married couples living together, 15.4% had a female householder with no husband present, and 19.2% were non-families. 15.4% of all households were made up of individuals, and 7.7% had someone living alone who was 65 years of age or older. The average household size was 2.54 and the average family size was 2.81.

In the city, the population was spread out, with 33.3% under the age of 18, 4.5% from 18 to 24, 31.8% from 25 to 44, 22.7% from 45 to 64, and 7.6% who were 65 years of age or older. The median age was 32 years. For every 100 females, there were 127.6 males. For every 100 females age 18 and over, there were 131.6 males.

The median income for a household in the city was $28,750, and the median income for a family was $25,938. Males had a median income of $49,375 versus $17,500 for females. The per capita income for the city was $22,672. There were 24.1% of families and 32.5% of the population living below the poverty line, including 57.7% of under eighteens and none of those over 64.

== Climate ==
This climatic region is typified by large seasonal temperature differences, with warm to hot (and often humid) summers and cold (sometimes severely cold) winters. According to the Köppen Climate Classification system, Pingree has a humid continental climate, abbreviated "Dfb" on climate maps.
