= Medina, North Dakota =

- City
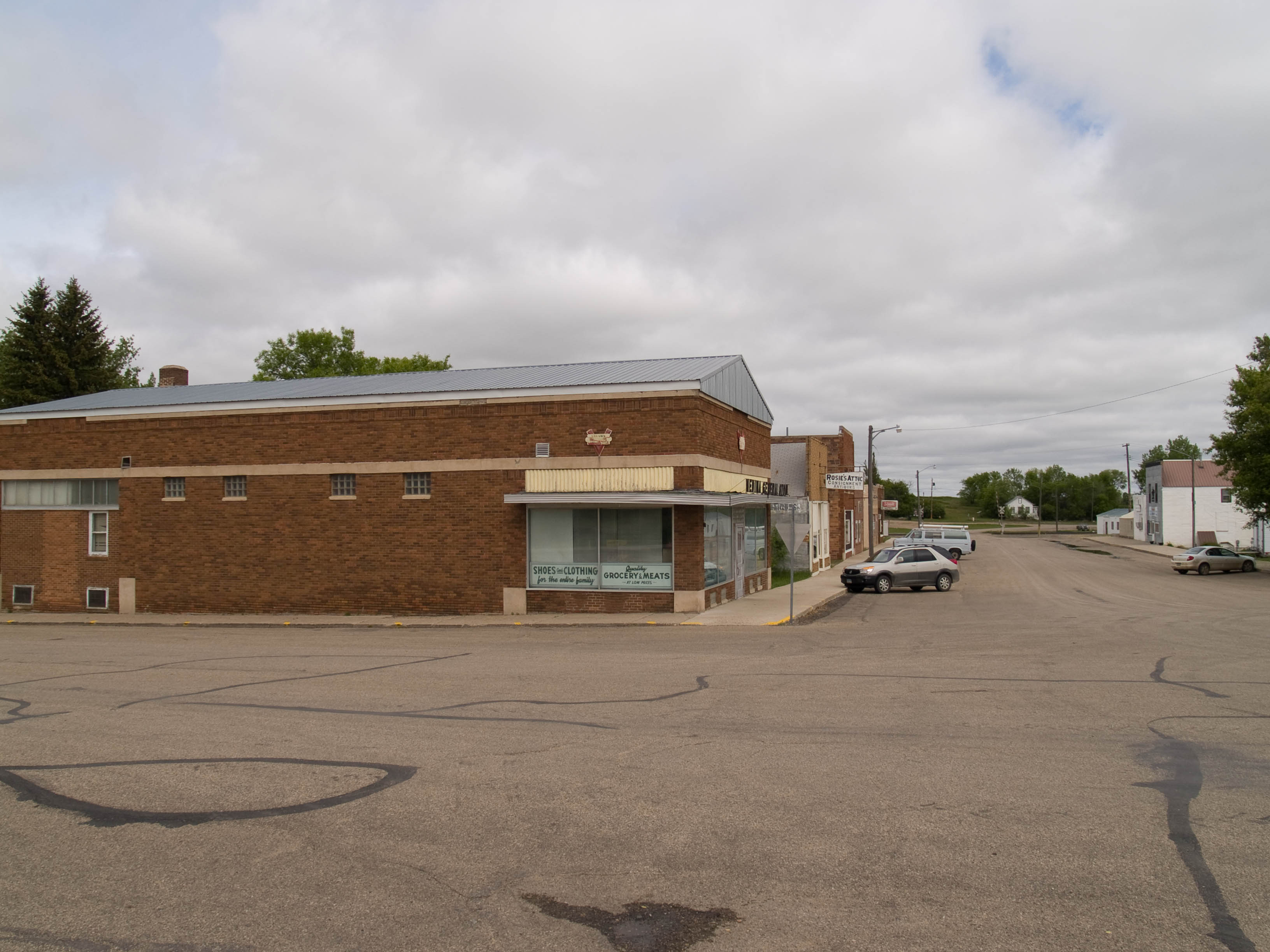
- Business District of Medina

- Logo

- Location of Medina, North Dakota
- Coordinates: 46°53′38″N 99°18′00″W
- Country: United States
- State: North Dakota
- County: Stutsman
- Founded: 1899

Area
  - Total: 1.21 sq mi (3.14 km^{2})
  - Land: 1.21 sq mi (3.14 km^{2})
  - Water: 0 sq mi (0.00 km^{2})
- Elevation: 1,808 ft (551 m)

Population (2020)
  - Total: 264
  - Estimate (2022): 266
  - Density: 217.4/sq mi (83.95/km^{2})
- Time zone: UTC-6 (Central (CST))
  - Summer (DST): UTC-5 (CDT)
- ZIP code: 58467
- Area code: 701
- FIPS code: 38-51860
- GNIS feature ID: 1036157
- Website: cityofmedinand.com

Medina is a city in Stutsman County, North Dakota, United States. The population was 264 at the 2020 census. Medina was founded in 1899.

== Geography ==
According to the United States Census Bureau, the town has a total area of 1.02 square miles (2.64 km^{2}), all land.

== History ==
Medina was originally called Eleventh Siding, and under the latter name got its start in the 1870s when the railroad was extended to that point. A post office called Medina has been in operation since 1888. The city took its name after Medina, New York.

The town made national news on February 13, 1983 when it was the site of a shoot-out in which two U.S. Marshals were slain.

== Demographics ==
Historical population
| Census | Pop. | Note | %± |
|---|---|---|---|
| 1910 | 343 | | — |
| 1920 | 415 | | 21.0% |
| 1930 | 407 | | −1.9% |
| 1940 | 500 | | 22.9% |
| 1950 | 564 | | 12.8% |
| 1960 | 545 | | −3.4% |
| 1970 | 488 | | −10.5% |
| 1980 | 521 | | 6.8% |
| 1990 | 387 | | −25.7% |
| 2000 | 335 | | −13.4% |
| 2010 | 308 | | −8.1% |
| 2020 | 264 | | −14.3% |
| 2022 (est.) | 266 | | 0.8% |
U.S. Decennial Census; 2020 Census

=== 2010 census ===
As of the census of 2010, there were 308 people, 144 households, and 82 families residing in the town. The population density was 302.0 inhabitants per square mile (116.6/km^{2}). There were 182 housing units at an average density of 178.4 per square mile (68.9/km^{2}). The racial makeup of the city was 96.4% White, 0.3% Asian, and 3.2% from two or more races. Hispanic or Latino of any race were 0.6% of the population.

There were 144 households, of which 26.4% had children under the age of 18 living with them, 45.1% were married couples living together, 6.9% had a female householder with no husband present, 4.9% had a male householder with no wife present, and 43.1% were non-families. 37.5% of all households were made up of individuals, and 16.7% had someone living alone who was 65 years of age or older. The average household size was 2.14 and the average family size was 2.82.

The median age in the town was 43.3 years. 25.6% of residents were under the age of 18; 5.7% were between the ages of 18 and 24; 19.8% were from 25 to 44; 26% were from 45 to 64; and 22.7% were 65 years of age or older. The gender makeup of the city was 44.5% male and 55.5% female.

=== 2000 census ===
As of the census of 2000, there were 335 people, 165 households, and 99 families residing in the city. The population density was 331.3 inhabitants per square mile (127.9/km^{2}). There were 209 housing units at an average density of 206.7 per square mile (79.8/km^{2}). The racial makeup of the city was 99.40% White, and 0.60% from two or more races. Hispanic or Latino of any race were 0.30% of the population.

There were 165 households, out of which 19.4% had children under the age of 18 living with them, 52.1% were married couples living together, 3.6% had a female householder with no husband present, and 39.4% were non-families. 37.6% of all households were made up of individuals, and 26.1% had someone living alone who was 65 years of age or older. The average household size was 2.03 and the average family size was 2.62.

In the town, the population was spread out, with 20.0% under the age of 18, 2.1% from 18 to 24, 20.6% from 25 to 44, 23.6% from 45 to 64, and 33.7% who were 65 years of age or older. The median age was 50 years. For every 100 females, there were 79.1 males. For every 100 females age 18 and over, there were 78.7 males.

The median income for a household in the town was $22,059, and the median income for a family was $31,500. Males had a median income of $31,458 versus $17,500 for females. The per capita income for the town was $16,860. About 4.8% of families and 14.1% of the population were below the poverty line, including 15.4% of those under age 18 and 15.0% of those age 65 or over.

== Climate ==
This climatic region is typified by large seasonal temperature differences, with warm to hot (and often humid) summers and cold (sometimes severely cold) winters. According to the Köppen Climate Classification system, Elm Creek has a humid continental climate, abbreviated "Dfb" on climate maps.
