= Valley City Wetland Management District =

- IUCN category IV (habitat/species management area)
- Location within the United States
- Location: North Dakota, United States
- Nearest city: Valley City, ND
- Coordinates: 46°58′5″N 98°1′33″W
- Area: 76,000 acres (31,000 ha)
- Governing body: U.S. Fish and Wildlife Service
- Website: Valley City Wetland Management District

The Valley City Wetland Management District is located in the U.S. state of North Dakota and consists of 76,000 acres (307 km^{2}). The wetland district is a substation of the Arrowwood National Wildlife Refuge Complex, overseen by the U.S. Fish and Wildlife Service. 82 waterfowl production areas and four separate national wildlife refuges which are privately owned are in turn managed by the wetland district as easement refuges. The wetland district is in portions of 5 counties in the Prairie Pothole Region that was created by the retreat of glaciers 12,000 years ago, during the Last Glacial Maximum. One third of the protected lands are wetlands with the balance consisting of prairie.

Farming is widespread in the wetland district and the majority of the land managed is under private ownership. Both the Red and Sheyenne Rivers are located in the district. Hundreds of small lakes and ponds as well as numerous streams provide abundant water sources for migratory bird species, white-tailed deer, beaver, pronghorn and other smaller mammals. Working cooperatively with private landowners, the U.S. Fish and Wildlife Service assists in the management of the region ensuring a balance between agricultural and wildlife needs.
