= Tornadoes of 2011 =

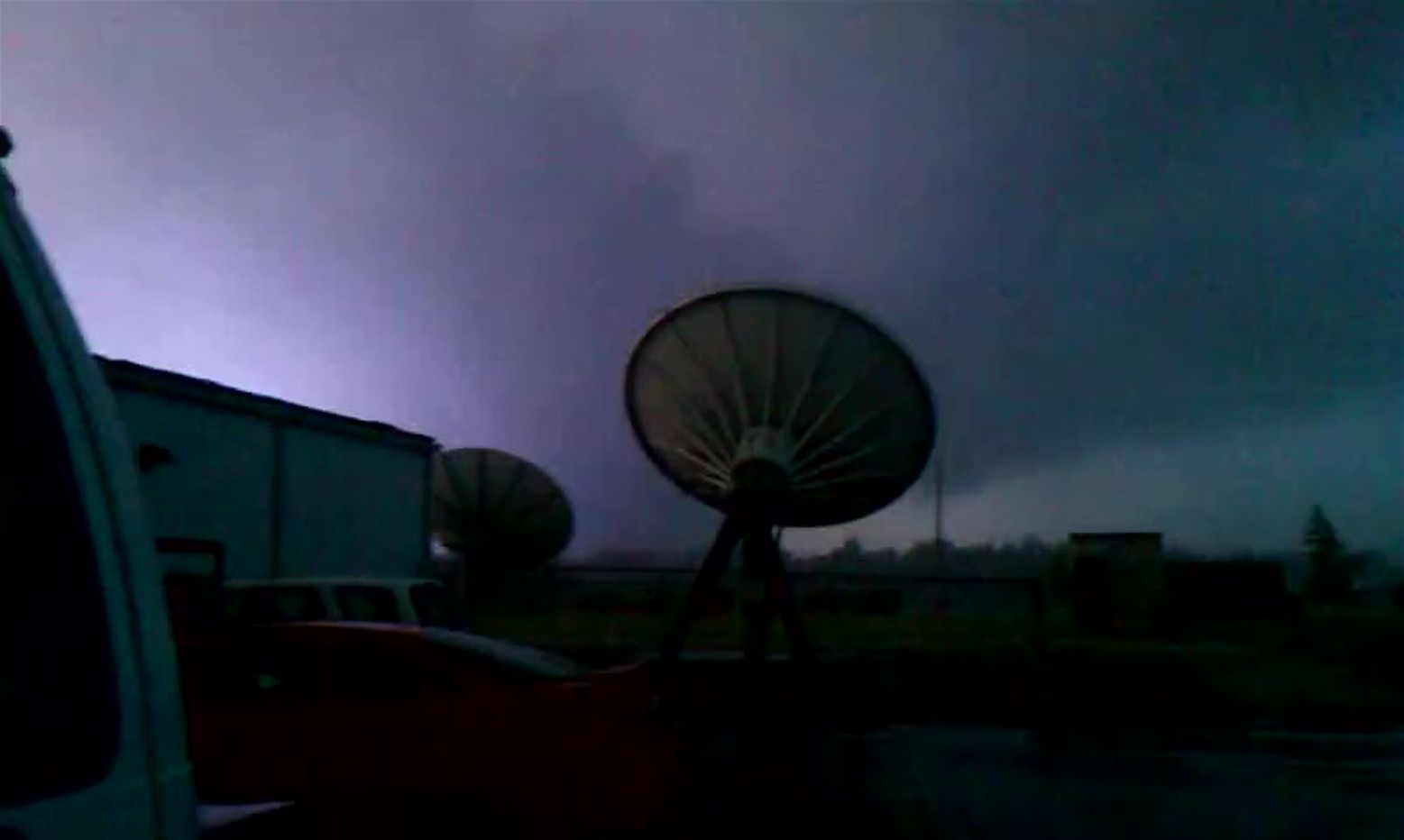
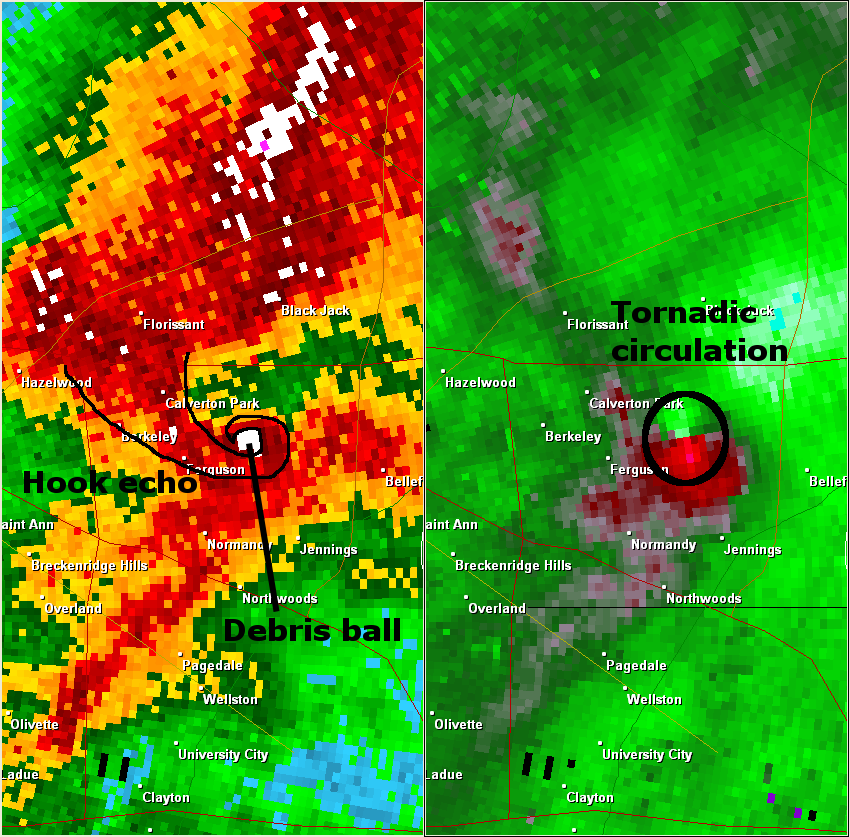
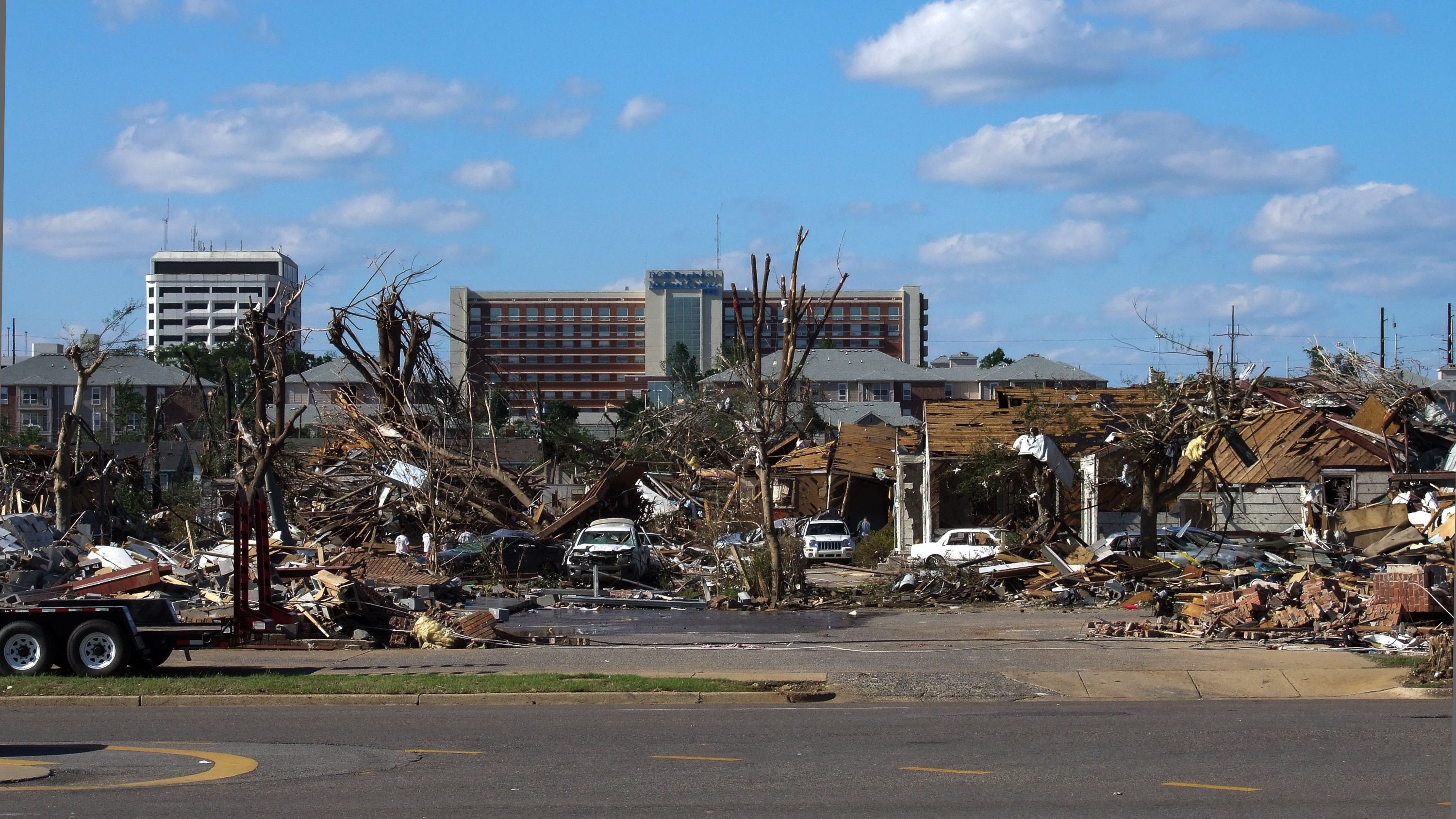
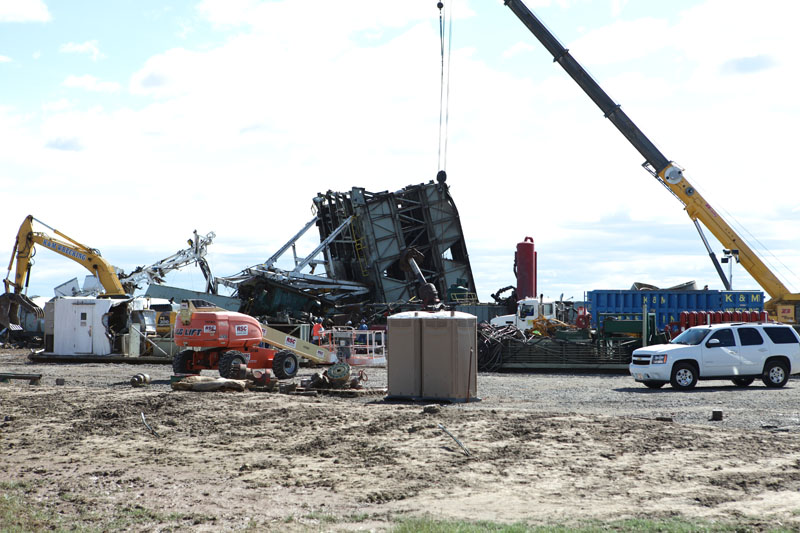
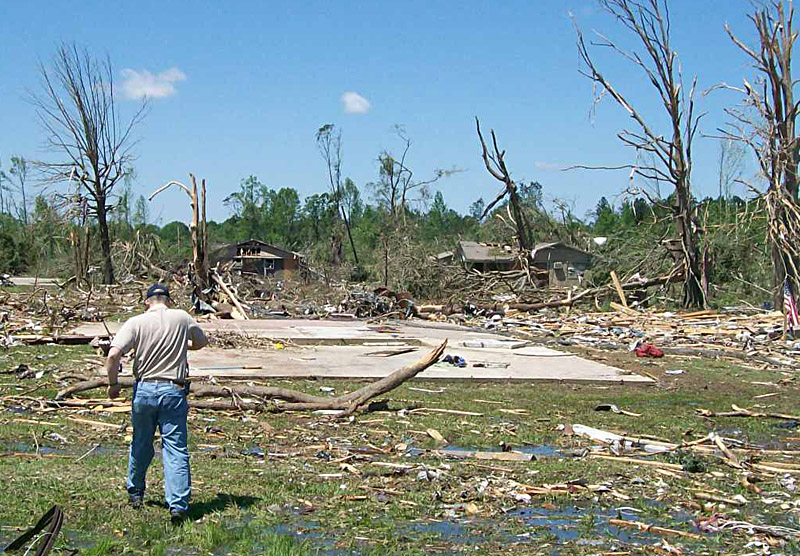
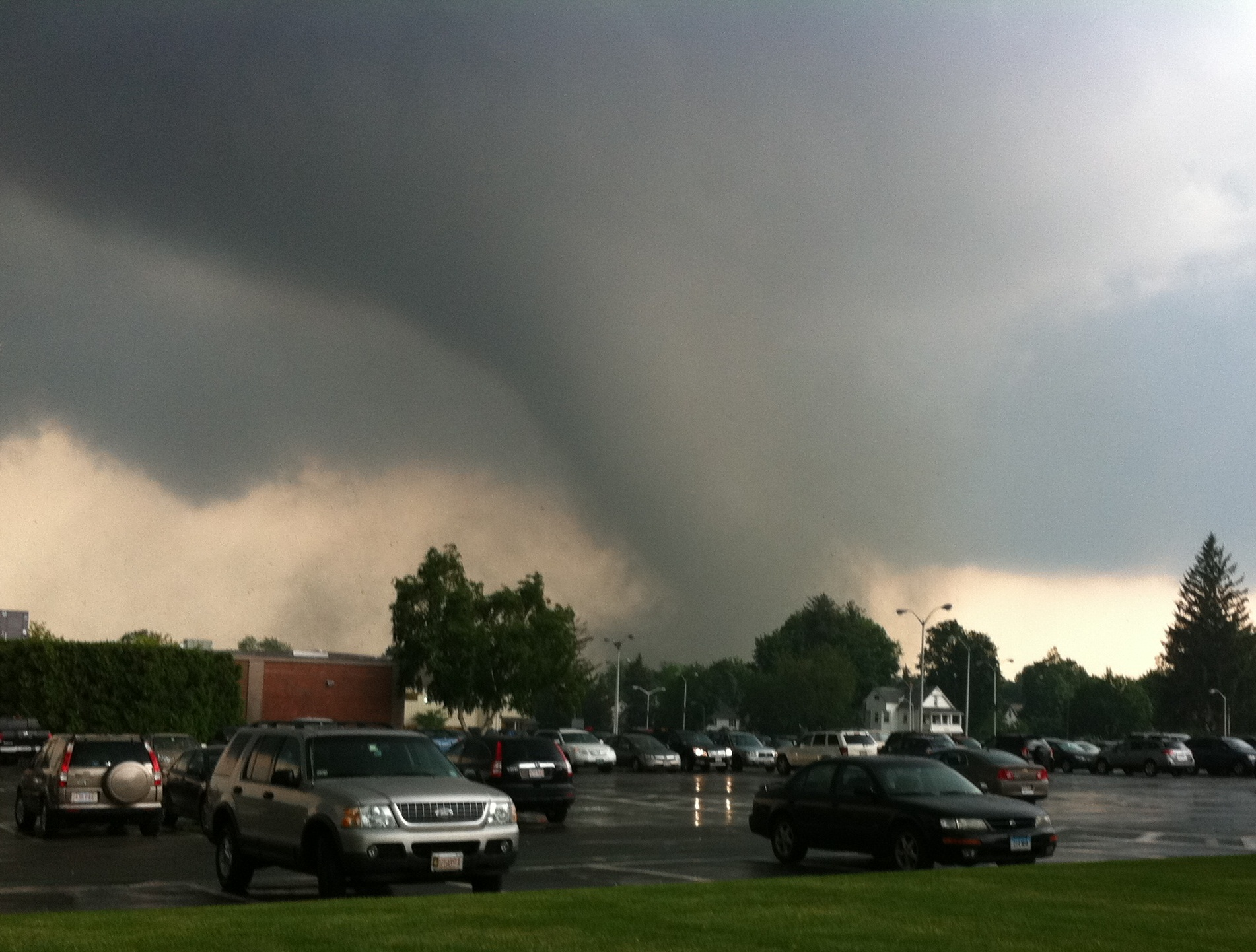
- Clockwise from top: a catastrophic EF5 tornado in Joplin, Missouri on May 22; Damage in Tuscaloosa, Alabama caused by a strong EF4 tornado on April 27; a destroyed house in Smithville, Mississippi after a fast-moving EF5 tornado; Photo of the long-tracked EF3 tornado that tore through Springfield, Massachusetts on June 1; damage to a two million pound oil rig by an extremely violent EF5 tornado on May 24; a Next-Generation Radar scan of an EF4 tornado that impacted Greater St. Louis, Missouri on April 22.
- Timespan: January 1 – December 22
- Maximum rated tornado: EF5 tornado: List; Philadelphia, Mississippi on April 27; Hackleburg-Phil Campbell, Alabama on April 27; Smithville, Mississippi on April 27; Rainsville, Alabama on April 27; Joplin, Missouri on May 22; El Reno, Oklahoma on May 24
- Tornadoes in U.S.: 1,715
- Damage (U.S.): ~$26.54 billion (Record costliest)
- Fatalities (U.S.): 547 (>5,370 injuries)
- Fatalities (worldwide): 570

Tornadoes of 2011 in the United States

This page documents the tornadoes and tornado outbreaks of 2011. Extremely destructive tornadoes form most frequently in the United States, Bangladesh, Brazil and Eastern India, but they can occur almost anywhere under the right conditions. Tornadoes also appear regularly in neighboring southern Canada during the Northern Hemisphere's summer season, and somewhat regularly in Europe, Asia, and Australia.

There were 1,715 tornadoes confirmed in the United States in 2011, which was the third most in a single year on record, with only 2024 and 2004 having more confirmed tornadoes. 2011 was a catastrophic and extremely deadly year for tornadoes; worldwide, at least 570 people perished due to tornadoes: 12 in Bangladesh, three each in Russia and Japan, two in South Africa, one each in New Zealand, the Philippines, Greece and Canada, and 547 in the United States (compared to 564 deaths in the prior ten years combined). Due mostly to several extremely large tornado outbreaks in the middle and end of April and in late May, the year finished well above average in almost every category, with six EF5 tornadoes and nearly enough total tornado reports to eclipse the mark of 1,817 tornadoes recorded in 2004, the current record year for total number of tornadoes.

The 547 confirmed fatalities marks the second-most tornadic deaths in a single year in U.S. history, behind only 1925 in terms of fatalities attributed to tornadic activity. Most of the damage and over two-thirds of the total fatalities in 2011 were caused by a late-April Super Outbreak and an EF5 tornado that struck Joplin, Missouri, in late May, becoming the costliest tornado on record.

== Synopsis ==
An ongoing outbreak at the end of 2010 continued into the first three hours of 2011. During that period seven tornadoes developed in Mississippi. However, during the remainder of the month, tornadic activity was suppressed by a cold air mass, with nine additional tornadoes – all weak – taking place.

This inactivity continued through much of February before a pattern shift. Two consecutive outbreaks took place on February 24 and 27 – 28, producing a combined 55 tornadoes. Overall, 63 tornadoes were confirmed in the month, making it the fourth most active February on record. Activity in March was split between the start and end of the month - with a total of 75 tornadoes recorded, it ran slightly above average for the month.

In early April, a prolific severe weather event produced 46 tornadoes and more than 1,200 reports of wind damage, setting the tone for the month.

A nearly continuous series of major tornado outbreaks followed thereafter in the remainder of April, including two extreme multi-day tornado outbreaks that were among the largest in U.S. history (one of them the deadliest and the costliest; and the other involving a widespread tornado outbreak in North Carolina, the worst since the March 28, 1984 outbreak) and two major tornado outbreaks in a time period from April 8 - 11 and April 19 - 24, resulting in an incredibly active month. April 2011 was the most active month for tornadoes on record, with an extremely large margin of 773 tornadoes in total.

However, in an abrupt reversal, the activity did not continue into May (normally the most active month for tornadoes), and the first half was remarkably quiet, becoming one of the least active Mays on record by the middle of the month. The lack of activity continued for three weeks until a tornado outbreak sequence began on May 21, and a deadly EF5 tornado hit Joplin, Missouri the following day in the event.

Additional strong to violent tornadoes occurred on May 24 in Oklahoma, including another EF5 in the city of El Reno. The outbreak sequence continued for the next several days, with 241 confirmed tornadoes, bringing the month of May to near average. Despite its near average count of tornadoes, it was catastrophic when it came to fatalities - 158 of the deaths came from the Joplin tornado.

The first day of June brought a rare outbreak into New England. Several tornadoes occurred, some of which were destructive. However, another reversal took place afterward and much of June was fairly quiet, with the exception of an active period in the third week of the month which included a moderate tornado outbreak.

July was also relatively quiet for the most part with below normal activity, occurring mostly within the northern Plains. August was more quiet with below normal activity and only 59 confirmed tornadoes. September and October were also below average. November was somewhat more active, primarily due to two moderate outbreaks in the first half of the month. December saw a return to inactivity for most of the month, but there was a small outbreak of 13 tornadoes on December 22, making it the final tornado outbreak of the year and ending what was the worst year for tornadoes since 2008.

== Events ==
=== United States ===
Confirmed tornadoes by Enhanced Fujita rating
EFU	EF0	EF1	EF2	EF3	EF4	EF5	Total
0	802	629	199	62	17	6	1,715

Fatal United States tornadoes in 2011
- Approximate touchdown location of killer tornadoes in 2011
- Summary of tornadoes: February 28 – Tennessee (1 death); March 5 – Louisiana (1 death); April 5 – Georgia (1 death); April 14 – Oklahoma (2 deaths); April 15 – Arkansas (2 deaths); April 15 – Alabama (1 death); April 15 – Mississippi, Alabama (4 deaths); April 15 – Alabama (3 deaths); April 16 – North Carolina (6 deaths); April 16 – North Carolina (2 deaths); April 16 – North Carolina (3 deaths); April 16 – North Carolina (1 death); April 16 – Virginia (2 deaths); April 16 – North Carolina (12 deaths); April 25 – Arkansas (1 death); April 25 – Arkansas (4 deaths); April 27 – Mississippi (1 death); April 27 – Alabama (1 death); April 27 – Alabama (1 death); April 27 – Tennessee (1 death); April 27 – Mississippi (3 deaths); April 27 – Alabama (6 deaths); April 27 – Mississippi (4 deaths); April 27 – Alabama, Tennessee (72 deaths); April 27 – Alabama (13 deaths); April 27 – Mississippi (23 deaths); April 27 – Alabama, Georgia (14 deaths); April 27 – Alabama (64 deaths); April 27 – Alabama, Tennessee (1 death); April 27 – Tennessee (4 deaths); April 27 – Alabama (7 deaths); April 27 – Mississippi, Alabama (7 deaths); April 27 – Alabama, Georgia (25 deaths); April 27 – Alabama, Georgia (22 deaths); April 27 – Georgia, Tennessee (20 deaths); April 27 – Virginia (1 death); April 27 – Tennessee (4 deaths); April 27 – Alabama (7 deaths); April 27 – Georgia (1 death); April 27 – Tennessee (6 deaths); April 27 – Tennessee (2 deaths); April 27 – Georgia (2 deaths); April 27 – Georgia (2 deaths); April 27 – Tennessee (2 deaths); April 28 – Virginia (3 deaths); May 21 – Kansas (1 death); May 22 – Minnesota (1 death); May 22 – Missouri (158 deaths); May 24 – Oklahoma (1 death); May 24 – Oklahoma (9 deaths); May 24 – Oklahoma (1 death); May 24 – Kansas (2 deaths); May 25 – Arkansas (4 deaths); May 25 – Arkansas (1 death); June 1 – Massachusetts (3 deaths); August 10 – Oklahoma (1 death); August 19 – Wisconsin (1 death); November 16 – North Carolina (2 deaths); November 16 – South Carolina (3 deaths)
- Total fatalities: 547

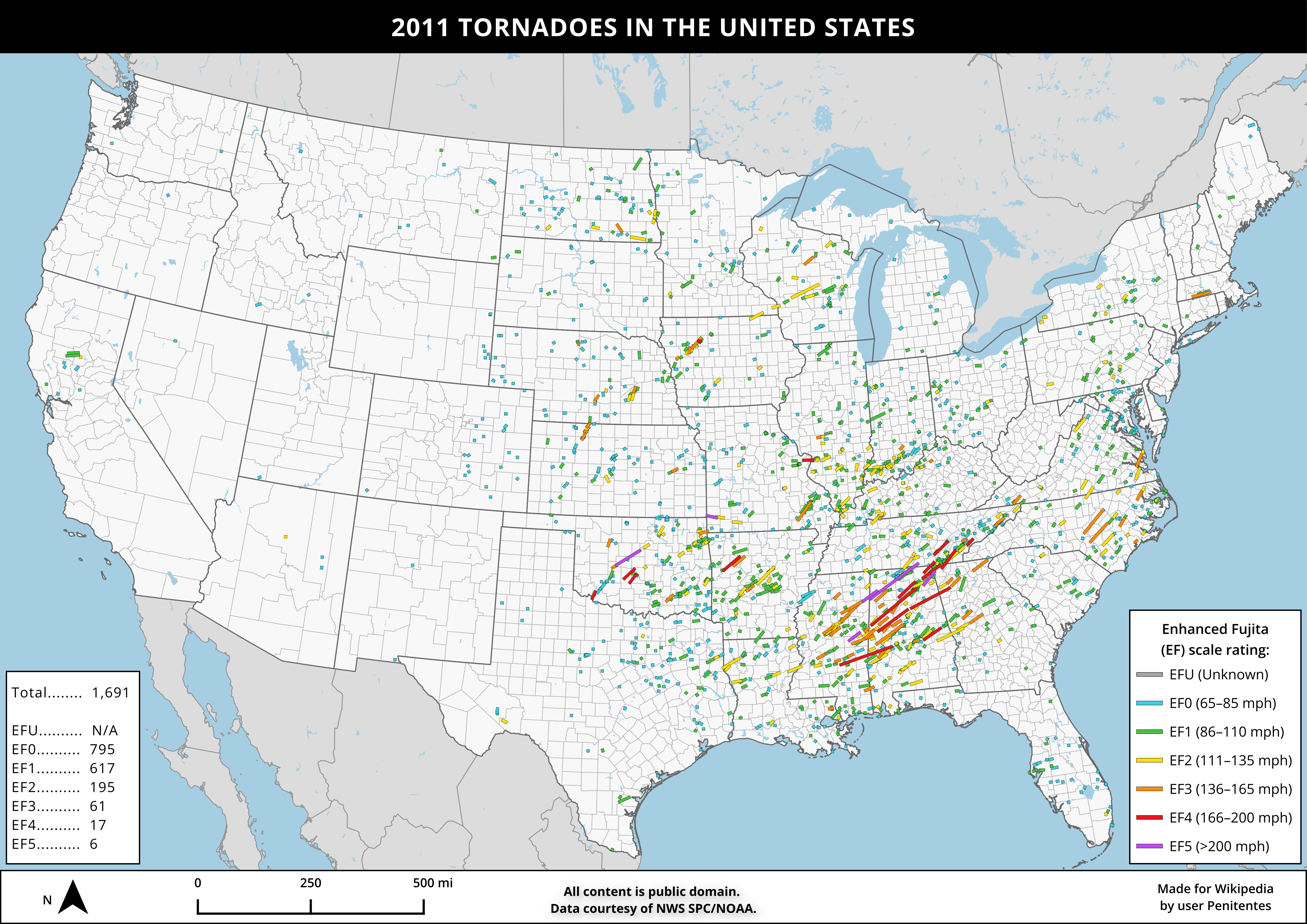
A map of 2011 United States tornado paths from the results of storm surveys.

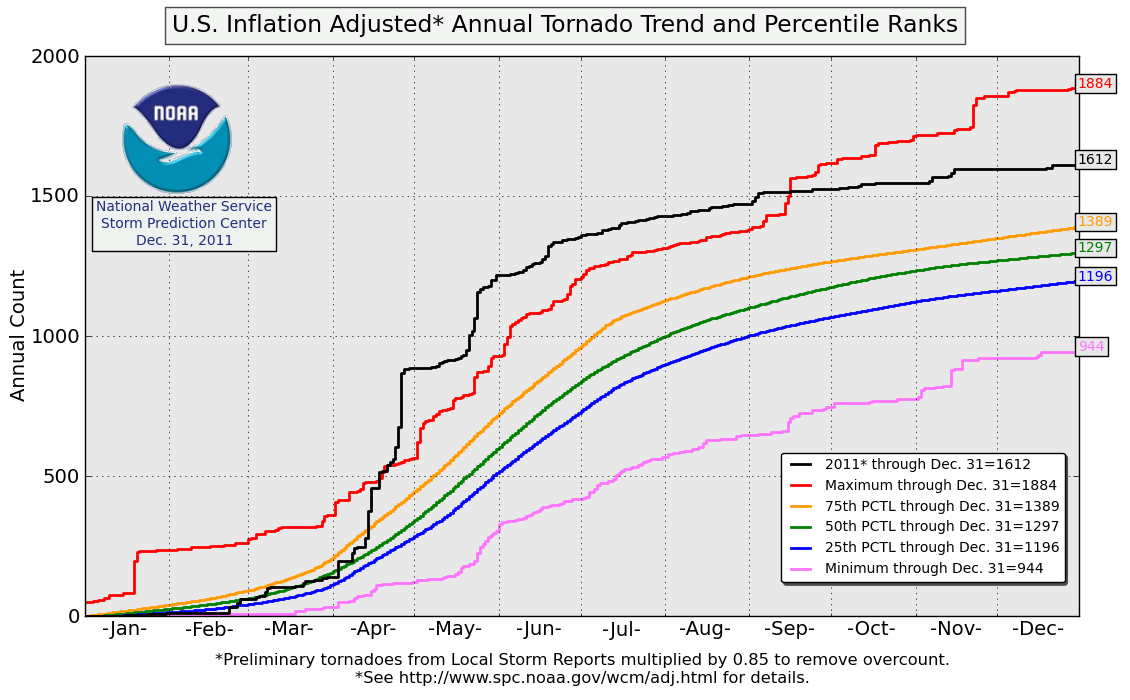
A chart of the 2011 United States tornado count estimated from the number of preliminary reports

== January ==
=== January 1 (United States) ===
EFU	EF0	EF1	EF2	EF3	EF4	EF5
0	0	4	1	2	0	0

A deadly late-season tornado outbreak continued through the early hours of January 1, with seven tornadoes occurring in Mississippi over three hours. The strongest of these, rated EF3 with winds of 145 mph (233 km/h), reached 0.75 mi (1.21 km) in width along its 23.45 mi (37.74 km) track and caused significant damage along MS 19. Several structures were damaged or destroyed and two people were injured. Near MS 35, thousands of trees were uprooted by the tornado. Another EF3 tornado formed near Macon, damaging or destroying several structures, and one person was injured. Overall damage in the state from tornadoes amounted to $10.4 million.

=== January 24–25 (Europe) ===
FU	F0	F1	F2	F3	F4	F5
0	0	2	1	0	0	0

In late January, three tornadoes occurred in eastern Europe: two in Turkey and one in Greece. In Kemalpaşa, Turkey, an F1 tornado caused the wall of an industrial building to collapse. Several other structures sustained roof damage. The strongest of these tornadoes, rated F2, was in northern Rhodes, where it destroyed small structures and killed several heads of cattle. Hail up to 5 cm (2.0 in) in diameter fell in some places, damaging farmland and greenhouses. Accumulations of hail also reached 15 cm (5.9 in) in Mersin Province, Turkey.

== February ==
=== February 21 (Australia) ===
A tornado in an outer rainband of Cyclone Carlos struck Karratha in its central business district, damaging approximately thirty-eight homes and multiple businesses. Later reports specified twenty-two homes with significant damage and at least nine commercial properties, including a Mercure All Seasons hotel and a Woolworths supermarket. This tornado never received an official rating.

=== February 23 (Greece) ===
A strong, F2 tornado struck the village of Gennadi on the southeastern coast of Rhodes, during the afternoon. The tornado caused significant structural damage, destroying two seaside restaurants, tearing solar heaters from rooftops, uprooting trees and utility poles, and reportedly lifting a shipping container over a house, damaging it severely. It lasted roughly half an hour, and while the storm left extensive property damage, no injuries were reported.

=== February 24 (United States) ===
EFU	EF0	EF1	EF2	EF3	EF4	EF5
0	3	6	5	0	0	0

Several tornadoes occurred across the Southern United States. The most significant tornado was in the southeastern part of Nashville, Tennessee where significant damage was reported near Hickory Hollow Mall and near Percy Priest Lake in the evening (with widespread wind damage all across Middle Tennessee), and a tornado emergency was declared shortly thereafter for areas to the northeast in Wilson County where another tornado developed, causing injuries. Both tornadoes were rated EF2. Other tornadoes formed, with varying degrees of damage in the Missouri Bootheel, West Tennessee, Mississippi, southwestern Kentucky and parts of Arkansas including three others rated EF2. The overall damage from this system amounted to $1,500,000.

=== February 27–28 (United States) ===
EFU	EF0	EF1	EF2	EF3	EF4	EF5
0	11	21	7	1	0	0

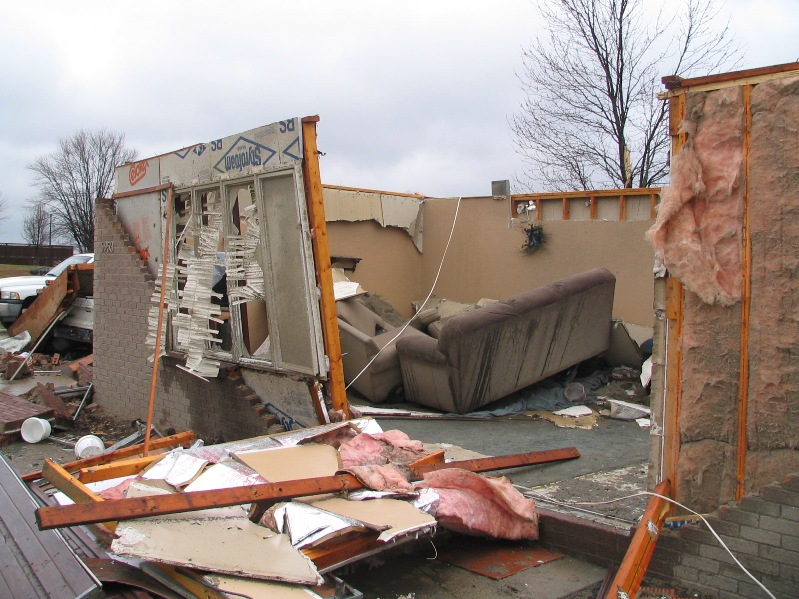
A home destroyed by an EF2 tornado in Dubois County, Indiana

Another severe weather event developed on February 27 and continued into February 28 across the Midwest and South. While a large portion of the damage was due to damaging straight-line winds, at least 35 tornadoes were reported across several states. The most destructive tornado was in Franklin County, Tennessee on the afternoon of February 28 where one person was killed by an EF2 tornado. It was the first fatal tornado of 2011. Another strong tornado, rated EF3, resulted in houses destroyed near Eminence, Kentucky. Concentrated tornado activity also occurred in parts of Missouri and Illinois with 22 tornadoes in the region, some as strong as EF2, related to a series of squall lines with many embedded tornadoes. None of those tornadoes resulted in any fatalities. Overall damages from this system amounted to $12,800,000.

== March ==
=== March 5–6 (United States) ===
EFU	EF0	EF1	EF2	EF3	EF4	EF5
0	7	2	1	0	0	0

One confirmed EF0 tornado hit the town of Crowley, Louisiana. Another reportedly hit Greene County, Mississippi on March 5. It formed in a squall line, which hit portions of Mississippi, Alabama, and Louisiana. A deadly EF2 tornado struck Rayne, Louisiana early that afternoon, killing a mother while she protected her daughter. about 12 others were injured. Initial assessments indicate that 62 homes were destroyed and 50 more damaged. Two EF0 tornadoes were also confirmed in eastern North Carolina.

=== March 8–9 (United States) ===
EFU	EF0	EF1	EF2	EF3	EF4	EF5
0	5	10	5	0	0	0

Several tornadoes formed on March 8 into March 9 from North Texas eastward to the Florida Panhandle, with Louisiana hardest hit. The most destructive tornadoes, rated EF2, began just north of New Orleans in St. Tammany Parish.

=== March 21–23 (United States) ===
EFU	EF0	EF1	EF2	EF3	EF4	EF5
0	7	4	3	1	0	0

A tornado developed in the afternoon of March 21 near Maxwell, California, and crossed I-5. It caused no known damage and was on the ground for only a few minutes. The same system produced more severe weather ahead of a dry line across eastern Nebraska, where tornadoes were reported northeast of Omaha. Later, a cluster of supercells began producing tornadoes in south-central Iowa, where a tornado was reported in Greenfield, Iowa, and at least 2 tornadoes were reported near Winterset, Iowa. Several funnel clouds were reported in Des Moines. These funnels were associated with the storm that produced the first tornado to hit Greenfield and Winterset.

On March 23, more tornadoes and severe weather developed with the most significant tornadoes occurring in East Tennessee where significant damage was reported. Near Greenback in Blount County, an EF3 tornado was confirmed with severe damage in the area. Another notable tornado was recorded in southwestern Pennsylvania, most notably in Hempfield Township, Pennsylvania. It was rated EF2.

=== March 29–31 (United States) ===
EFU	EF0	EF1	EF2	EF3	EF4	EF5
0	6	7	0	0	0	0

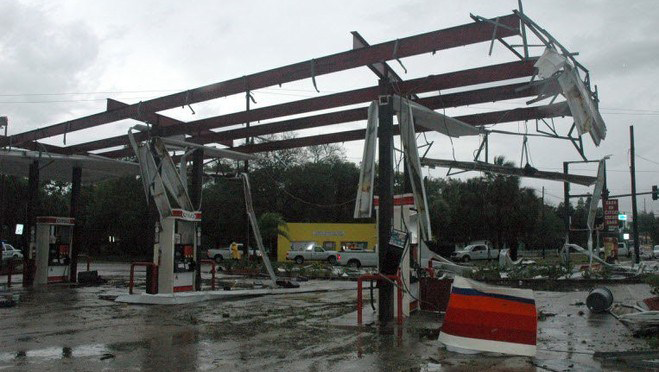
Damage from one of the tornadoes near Tampa

On March 29, a warm front over the Gulf of Mexico associated with an upper-level low over Texas moved northward into the Gulf Coast States, bringing scattered severe weather. In Louisiana, three tornadoes transpired, including an EF1 which caused a three-story building to collapse. In Mississippi, one person was killed after lightning caused a house fire. A strong microburst also took place in Copiah County, producing winds up to 110 mph (180 km/h). Activity shifted into central Florida on March 30 as a frontal boundary stalled out across the state. During the two-day period, ten tornadoes occurred and a series of squall lines produced widespread wind damage on March 31. Significant damage took place in several communities and damage exceeded $5 million. Seven people were injured when one of the tornadoes hit a local festival.

== April ==
=== April 4 (Bangladesh) ===
During the afternoon of April 4, a powerful tornado struck seven districts in northern Bangladesh. At least 12 people were killed and more than 150 injured as the tornado destroyed hundreds of homes and uprooted large swaths of vegetation.

=== April 4–5 (United States) ===
EFU	EF0	EF1	EF2	EF3	EF4	EF5
0	9	31	6	0	0	0

Several storms started to develop in the evening on April 3. Storms in Kansas, Missouri, Iowa and Illinois brought severe thunderstorms to the areas. A tornado watch was issued for Iowa and Illinois as the storms rolled through, and later a severe thunderstorm watch for northeastern Illinois and southeastern Wisconsin. However, there were no reported tornadoes. Continuing eastward, the system entered an environment favoring tornadic development. Two tornadoes were reported in Kentucky during the early afternoon, both rated EF2 and resulting in injuries. Near Hopkinsville, a tornado, confirmed by local emergency services, caused significant damage to a manufacturing plant. Numerous buildings were reported to be destroyed, trapping residents within debris. In addition to the tornadoes, there was widespread wind damage (over 1,400 severe weather reports were received by the Storm Prediction Center, with the vast majority being damaging winds) as an extremely large squall line/serial derecho tracked across the southern United States with wind gusts as high as 90 mph (145 km/h) reported across 20 states, killing at least 9 people, one of the deaths was as a result of an EF2 tornado in Dodge County, Georgia. Numerous power outages also took place due to the extensive wind damage. Nearly 100,000 and 147,000 residences lost power in Tennessee and Georgia respectively.

=== April 8–11 (United States) ===
EFU	EF0	EF1	EF2	EF3	EF4	EF5
0	12	26	8	4	1	0

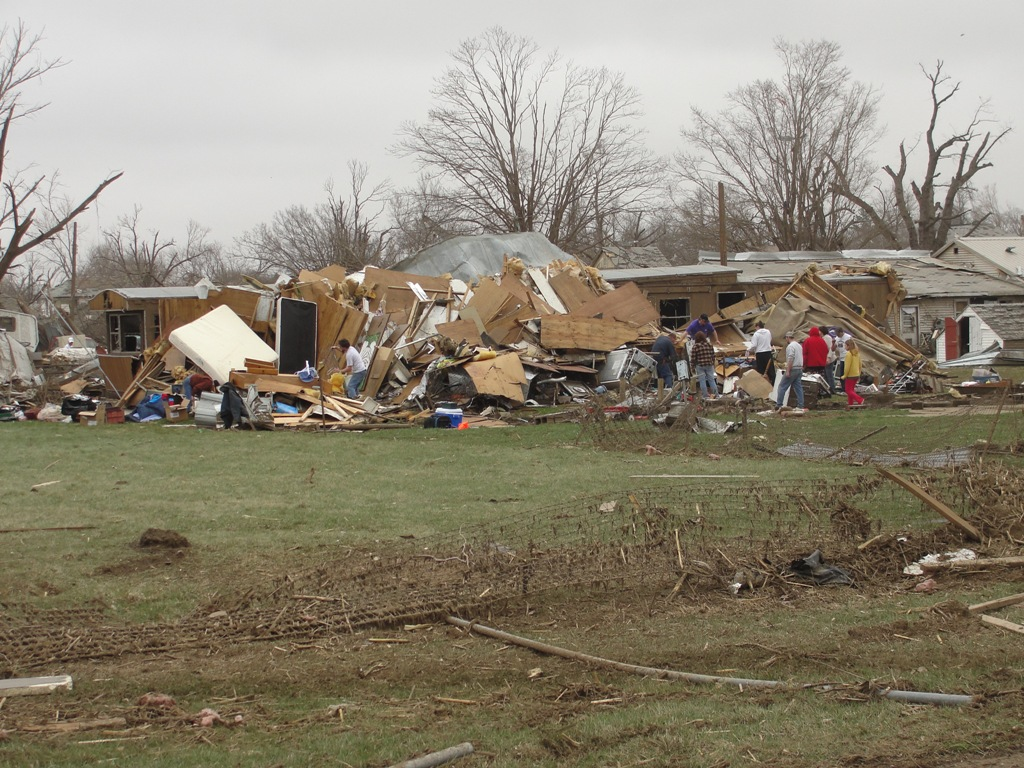
Damage from the EF3 Mapleton, Iowa tornado

A large storm system with an associated frontal boundary moved northward and eastward across the central United States beginning on April 8. While initial severe weather was limited, a lone supercell broke out ahead of a mesoscale convective system in Pulaski County, Virginia on the eastern end of the warm front that evening. Two tornadoes were confirmed, one of which was rated EF2 and caused severe damage in Pulaski, Virginia. Numerous houses were damaged and eight people were injured. During the afternoon of April 9, supercells developed along the warm front and tracked through parts of Kentucky, Tennessee, Virginia, and North Carolina, generating softball sized hail and eight more tornadoes.

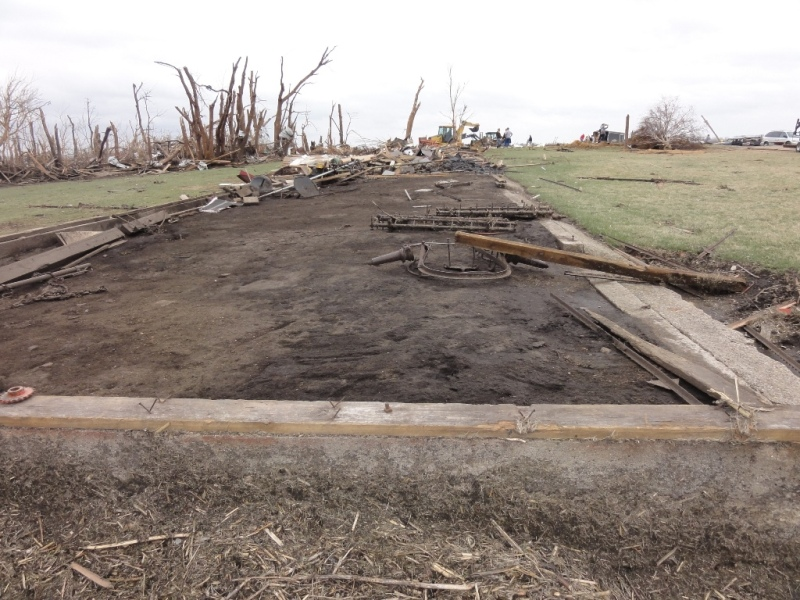
A farm outbuilding swept away by an EF4 tornado west of Pocahontas, Iowa on April 9

During the evening of April 9, several severe thunderstorms developed across Nebraska, South Dakota and Iowa. A single supercell became tornadic over extreme western Iowa, producing a family of ten tornadoes over the course of five hours, the most powerful of which was an EF4 satellite tornado that completely leveled a farmstead in western Pocahontas County, Iowa. The first tornado of the bunch was a 1,200 yd (0.68 mi; 1.1 km) wide EF3 tornado that struck Mapleton, Iowa, destroying about 100 homes. Due to a 20-minute warning time, no fatalities took place and only 14 people were injured. Officials blocked off the town and Iowa state governor Terry Branstad issued a disaster proclamation for the town.

Additional tornadic activity developed on April 10 across Wisconsin with several more tornadoes reported there.

=== April 14–16 (United States) ===
EFU	EF0	EF1	EF2	EF3	EF4	EF5
0	52	81	32	13	0	0

During the afternoon of April 14, a significant tornado outbreak started setting up. A PDS (Particularly Dangerous Situation) tornado watch was issued for much of eastern Oklahoma. Supercells explosively developed over central Oklahoma. Storm chasers in the region reported several funnel clouds and two tornadoes, neither of which resulted in damage. Several tornadoes were confirmed through storm chaser video and local emergency management services. A large, intense, multiple-vortex tornado caused severe damage in the towns of Atoka and Tushka where many houses were destroyed or flattened. Numerous injuries were reported in the latter of these areas. Two people were killed and 25 more injured in Tushka. In Arkansas, 2 people were killed when an EF1 downed a tree which landed on a house.

During the late-night hours into the morning of April 15, tornadic activity lessened. However, by the late morning hours, supercell thunderstorms developed again over parts of Mississippi, and tornadoes began to develop again. A tornado emergency was declared for the northern Jackson metropolitan area as a result at shortly after 11:00 am CDT (1600 UTC). A destructive tornado moved across the area with severe damage and multiple injuries according to WLBT coverage. That afternoon, Mississippi State University spotters confirmed a large tornado in east-central Mississippi and west-central Alabama and another tornado emergency was issued. ABC 33/40 coverage reported that the tornado was 3/4 mile (1.2 km) in width. Over 90 tornado sightings were reported that day and at least eight people were killed in Mississippi and Alabama.

On April 16, another PDS tornado watch, along with a "high risk" alert from the SPC were issued for central and eastern North Carolina. At least 24 died and 135 were seriously injured in what became North Carolina's worst tornado outbreak in 25 years; tornadoes also struck South Carolina, Virginia, Maryland and Pennsylvania. Twelve of the North Carolina deaths took place in Bertie County; tornado emergencies were issued for Raleigh, Snow Hill, and Wilson at the height of the outbreak. In North Carolina, twelve supercells produced at least 25 tornadoes, with at least 32 counties affected. A total of 21 businesses and 440 homes were destroyed, 63 of those homes in Raleigh; about 92 businesses and 6,189 homes suffered significant damage, 184 of those homes in Raleigh.

=== April 19–22 (United States) ===
EFU	EF0	EF1	EF2	EF3	EF4	EF5
0	46	49	13	1	1	0

An EF3 tornado near Girard, Illinois on April 19

Yet another severe weather event developed across the Midwest and southern Great Plains on April 19 as another dynamic low pressure system tracked across the area. Thunderstorms began in the late afternoon and early evening with large hail and several tornadoes. Significant damage was reported near Bowling Green, Missouri and Girard, Illinois as a result of tornadoes, the latter of which was rated EF3. Another large tornado was reported near Octavia, Oklahoma, before the supercells merged into a very large derecho. Overnight, the derecho tracked eastward with widespread wind damage and many embedded tornadoes across several states, a few as strong as EF2, but most were brief and weak. In the early hours of April 20, 2011, a tornado tore through a neighborhood in Oregon, Ohio, leaving some significant damage but no injuries. Also, three tornadoes struck New Albany, Indiana, and Jeffersonville, Indiana. Both are cities just north of Louisville, Kentucky

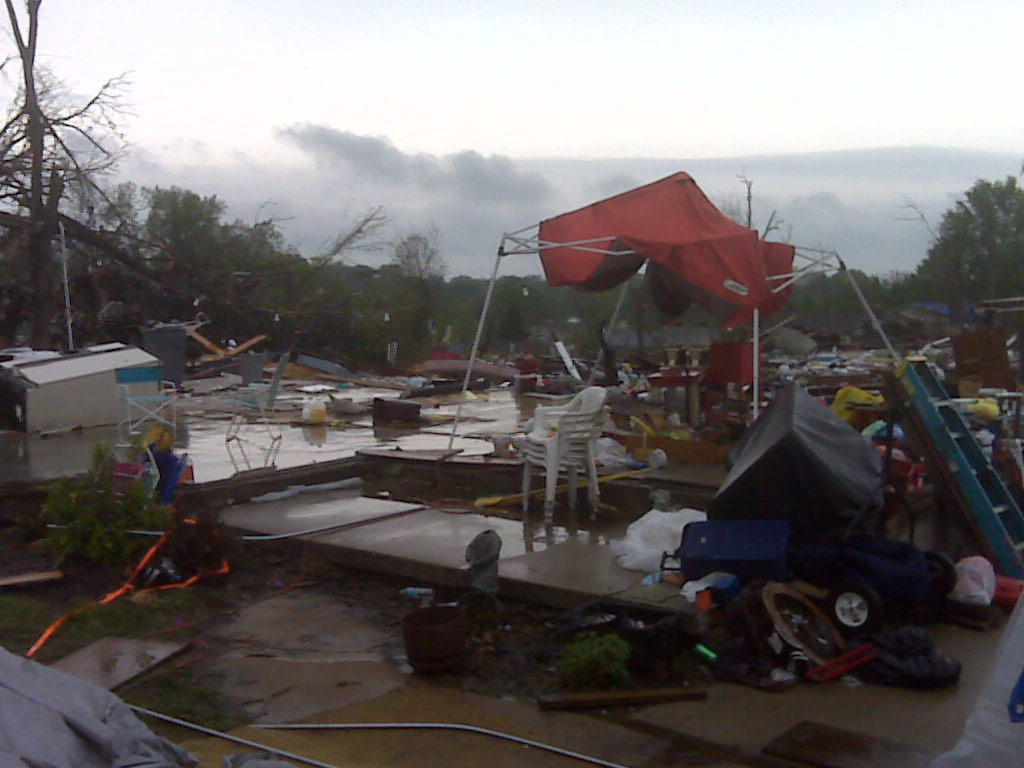
A house that was completely destroyed at EF4 intensity in the suburbs of St. Louis, Missouri

Severe weather once again developed across parts of the Midwest on April 22. The hardest-hit area was parts of the St. Louis metropolitan area. A destructive tornado tracked across the region with severe damage in several communities including houses destroyed in communities such as Bridgeton, Ferguson, Florissant, Hazelwood, Maryland Heights and New Melle. Lambert-St. Louis International Airport was hard hit with severe damage to numerous facilities there and injuries reported. Windows were blown out of the terminals there and airplanes were flipped in the field. Concourse C was the hardest hit, taking nearly a year to reopen; it reopened on April 2, 2012. The tornado was given a rating of EF4 based on finding of flattened houses in Bridgeton. Following assessments by the local National Weather Service, it was determined that a single tornado tracked for 22 miles (35 km) through parts of Missouri and Illinois, reaching a maximum width of 0.4 miles (0.64 km). Elsewhere, there were several reported tornadoes, including an EF2 tornado which tracked through Henderson, Webster and Union County.

=== April 25–28 (United States and Canada) ===
EFU	EF0	EF1	EF2	EF3	EF4	EF5
0	138	143	49	23	11	4

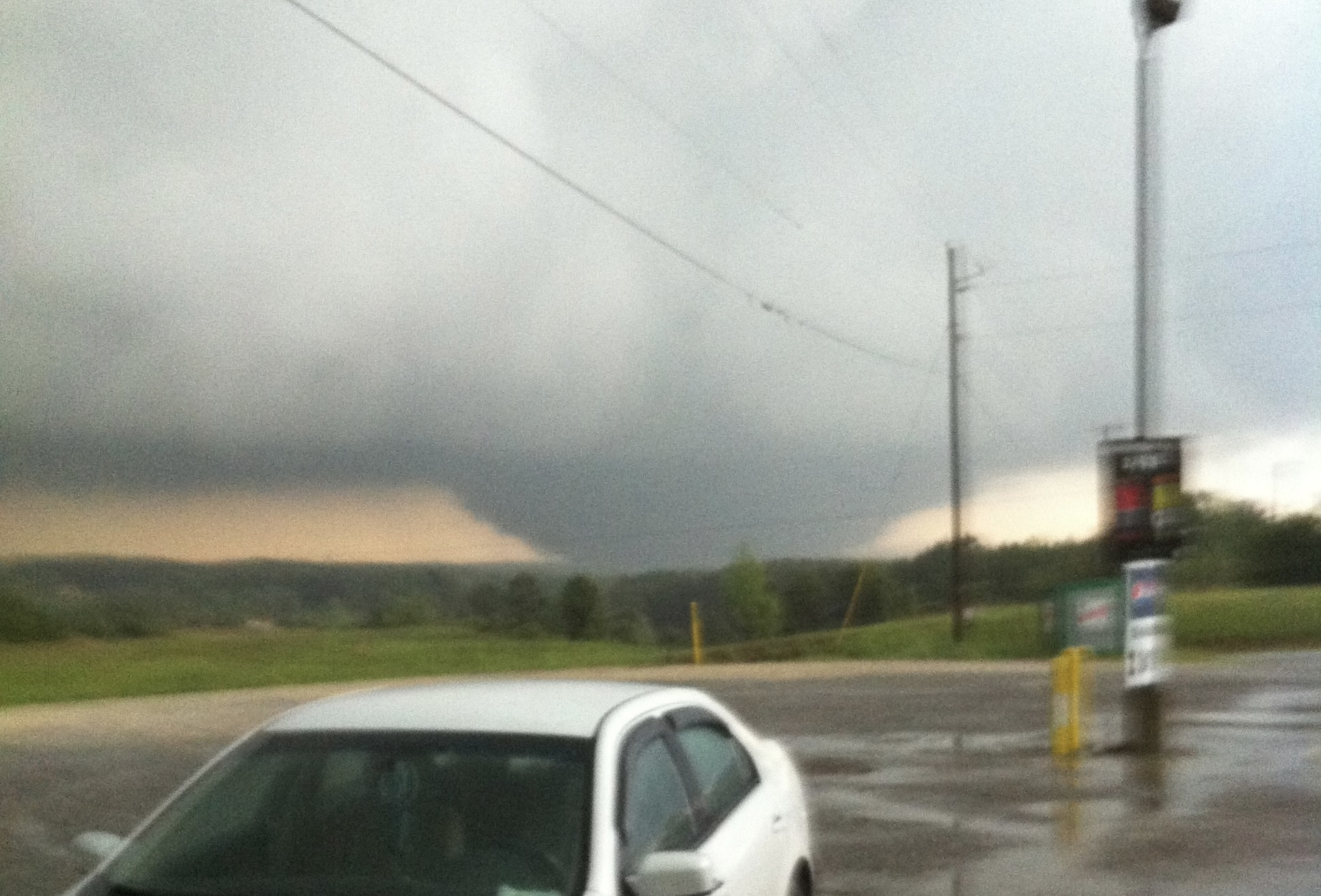
A deadly EF5 tornado exiting Phil Campbell, Alabama while causing heavy damage on April 27

Between April 25 and 28, a historic and devastating tornado outbreak took place across much of the Southern United States as well as parts of the Midwest and Northeast. With 367 confirmed tornadoes and 324 tornadic fatalities, the outbreak ranks as the largest and one of the worst in United States history. More than three dozen tornadoes were confirmed each day of the event, with 42 on April 25, 55 on April 26, a 24-hour record of 223 on April 27, and 47 on April 28. In terms of violent tornadoes, the event ranks third with 15 EF4/5 rated tornadoes, behind the 1974 Super Outbreak and 1965 Palm Sunday outbreak.

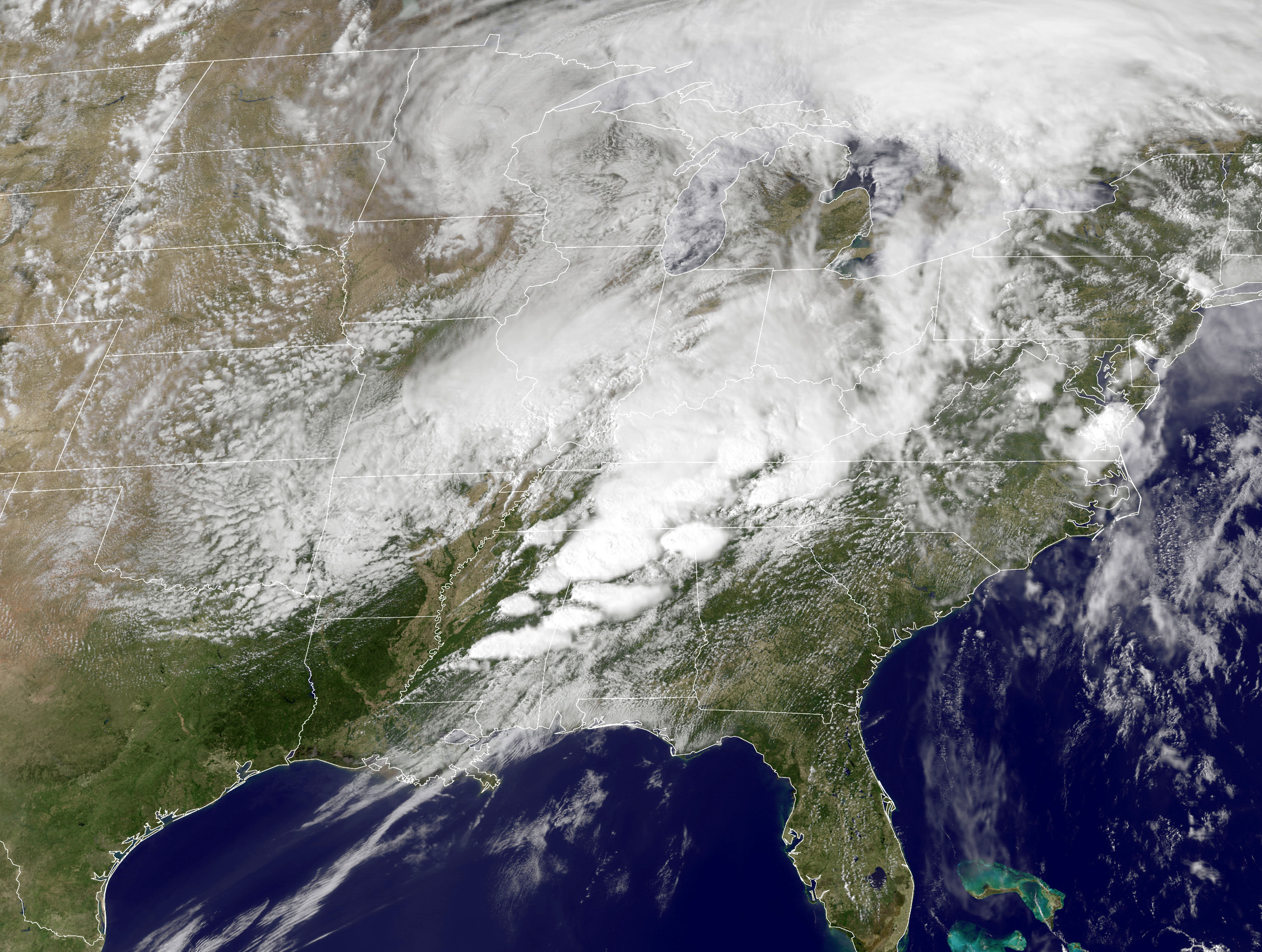
The cyclone responsible for the historic outbreak on April 27

A large outbreak was possible for April 25–27 as the SPC issued a moderate risk of severe weather for three consecutive days, centered over Arkansas through Tennessee. By the late-afternoon hours of April 25, several tornadoes had been reported across a few states, including two which caused significant damage in Oklahoma and Texas. At 3:25 pm CST (2025 UTC), the SPC issued a PDS tornado watch for much of Arkansas and parts of Missouri, Oklahoma, Texas and Louisiana. Tornadoes were scattered that day until early evening, when an intense tornadic cell tracked near the Little Rock metropolitan area and a tornado emergency was declared for Vilonia, Arkansas. A 1.5-mile (2.4 km) wide EF2 tornado then caused extensive damage in Vilonia. At least four people are known to have died in the town with many more injured.

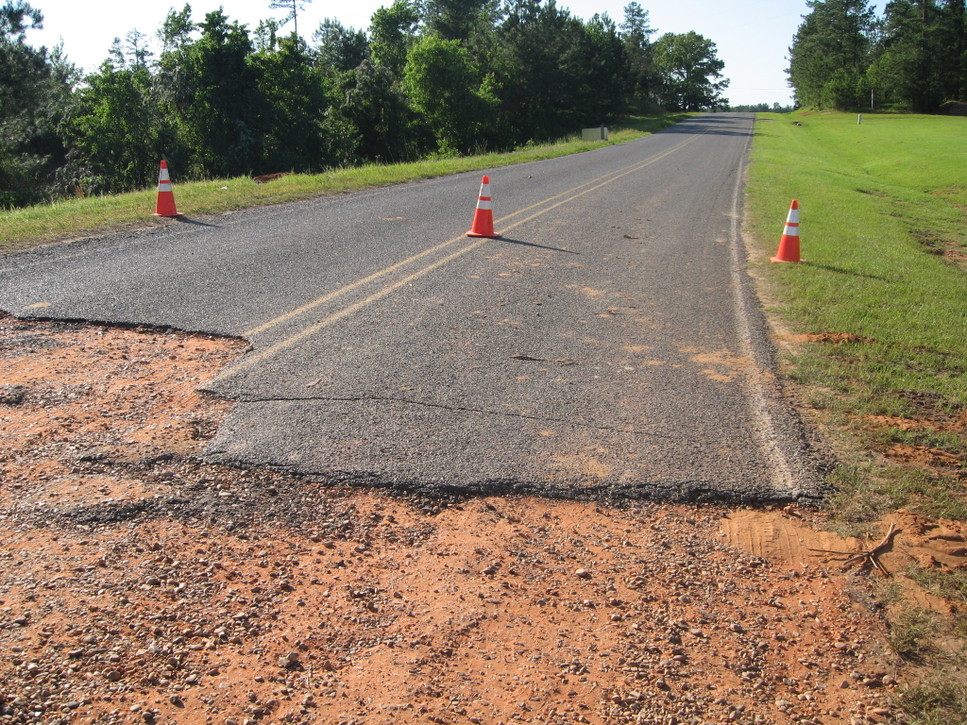
Road surface stripped by an EF5 tornado near Philadelphia, Mississippi

On April 27, a large and destructive EF4 tornado struck Tuscaloosa, Alabama, killing 44 people. The Tuscaloosa mayor called the damage "catastrophic." The same tornado hit the northern suburbs of Birmingham, Alabama, shortly thereafter, killing 20 more people. Television reporters in Birmingham, filming the tornado, reported that even from miles away, the funnel was so wide that they could not zoom their cameras out far enough to get the entire funnel into the frame at once. Over 200 tornadoes were reported during the SPC's reporting day of 1200Z April 27 (7:00 am CDT) to 1200Z April 28 (7:00 am CDT). 324 tornadic deaths were confirmed as a result of the outbreak, with as many as 238 in Alabama alone. The overall death toll also includes 32 deaths in Tennessee, 31 in Mississippi, 14 in Georgia, 5 in Arkansas, and 4 in Virginia, according to state officials.

On April 27, President Barack Obama approved Governor Robert Bentley's request for emergency federal assistance including search and rescue support.

On April 28, 2011, the National Weather Service sent out people to survey the damage; however, with the large number of tornadoes across Alabama, the reports were not finalized for months. By April 30, the death toll from the event (including death tolls from flooding and other severe weather) stood at more than 340 people across six states.

On a lesser note, an F0 tornado (the Fujita scale was still used in Canada) downed trees and ripped siding off store buildings in Fergus, Ontario on April 27.

== May ==
=== May 1–2 (China) ===
EFU	EF0	EF1	EF2	EF3	EF4	EF5
5	0	0	0	1	0	0

A couple of tornadoes were documented in China. On May 1, an intense EF3 tornado struck Duhetun, Pingle County, Guangxi. The tornado destroyed or severely damaged numerous homes, with at least twelve losing their roofs or supporting beams. Power lines and TV antennas were downed throughout the area. Several high-voltage power poles were also blown down, causing power and communication outages. A small tractor used for transplanting rice seedlings was blown more than 10 m (11 yd) away. Local reports described roof tiles and structural framing being blown away by intense winds. A tornado was also confirmed in Fuzhou, Fujian.

The following morning on May 2, another tornado touched down in Ruyuan Yao Autonomous County, Guangdong, damaging at least fifty-three houses across the villages of Chengtou, Luowu, Qiaobei, and Changbang, including one home that collapsed entirely. Crops were also damaged. This tornado was not officially rated on the EF scale. Tornadoes were also confirmed but not rated in the Zhangzhou, Laibin and Shenyang areas.

=== May 3 (New Zealand) ===
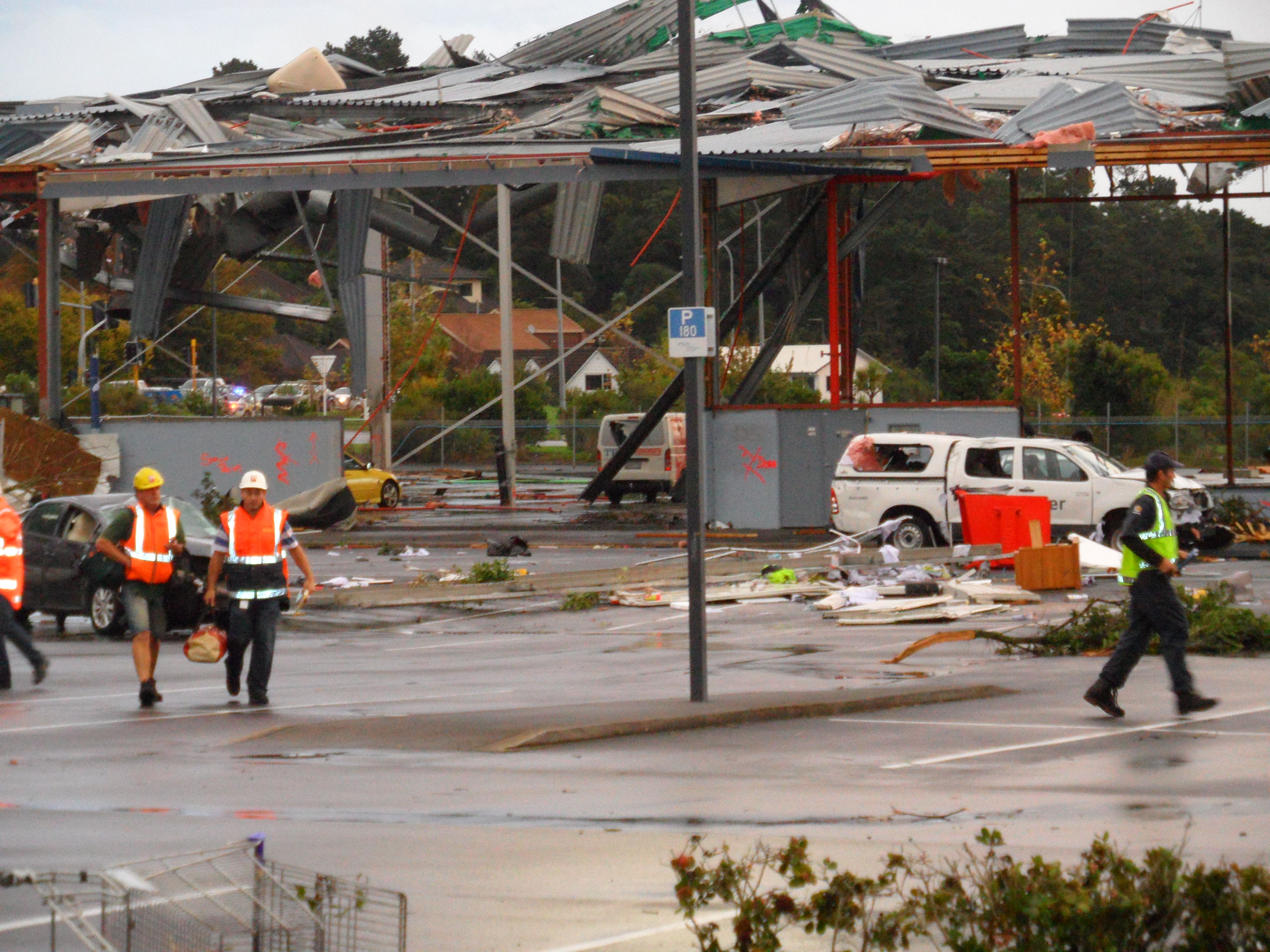
The Albany, New Zealand tornado caused significant damage to buildings in its path

On May 3, a line of showers and thunderstorms tracked into the Northland from the Tasman Sea, bringing unsettled weather to much of the region. The Meteorological Service of New Zealand Limited (MetService) mentioned the possibility of strong thunderstorms being embedded within the line, producing small hail and gusty winds. Significant upward motion in the atmosphere developed in the region surrounding Auckland, prompting the MetService to issue a high-risk of thunderstorms in the area. With low-level wind shear and helicity, the possibility of tornadic activity was present. At 2:55 pm NZST, a hook echo was apparent on the weather radar, indicating strong rotation and a likely tornado.

Several minutes later, around 3:00 pm NZST, a tornado struck the Auckland suburb of Albany. With winds estimated at 125 mph (201 km/h), the tornado ranked as a high-end EF2 and caused considerable damage along a 3.1 mi (5.0 km) long track in the area. Several cars were tossed up to 20 ft (6.1 m) in the air by the storm and pieces of iron roofing were reportedly seen 300 ft (91 m) above the ground. A total of 50 homes sustained varying degrees of damage along the tornado's track. The most severe damage took place at a local shopping mall where large portions of the roof were torn off. One person was killed and at least 20 others were injured here. Damage estimates from the storm were placed in the tens of millions.

=== May 7 (Philippines) ===
During Tropical Storm Aere, a tornado struck Calumpit, Bulacan, affecting about five hundred people. Initial reports noted no direct injuries, though officials investigated whether one heart-attack fatality was tornado-related. Subsequent NDRRMC reporting listed four houses destroyed and thirty-seven damaged in Calumpit.

=== May 12 (Taiwan) ===
A rare, short-lived tornado struck Xindian District, New Taipei City in the early afternoon. It overturned an SUV, tossed scooters, and damaged roofs and walls in a parking area. No casualties were reported. Forecasters attributed the event to frontal forcing and strong convection as a Meiyu front crossed northern Taiwan.

=== May 18 (China) ===
In the afternoon of May 18, a tornado rated EF2 struck Aohan Banner, Inner Mongolia. The storm collapsed three houses and damaged twelve mechanized wells in rural areas before dissipating. No fatalities were reported.

=== May 21–26 (United States) ===
EFU	EF0	EF1	EF2	EF3	EF4	EF5
0	109	86	31	8	3	2

A Next-Generation Radar loop, pictured in both reflectivity (left) and velocity (right) modes, of a supercell and tornado that struck Reading, Kansas

On May 21, a small system of thunderstorms began to develop in Brown County, Kansas. At the same time, another system formed to the southeast of Emporia, Kansas. The Brown County system produced a couple of tornadoes over Shawnee County, Kansas, including one near Topeka that caused minor damage. Meanwhile, the Emporia system moved to the northeast, where an EF3 tornado heavily damaged the town of Reading, Kansas. One person was killed, several others were injured, and at least 20 houses were destroyed. Several other tornadoes occurred in the region that evening, all of which were in the EF0–EF1 range.

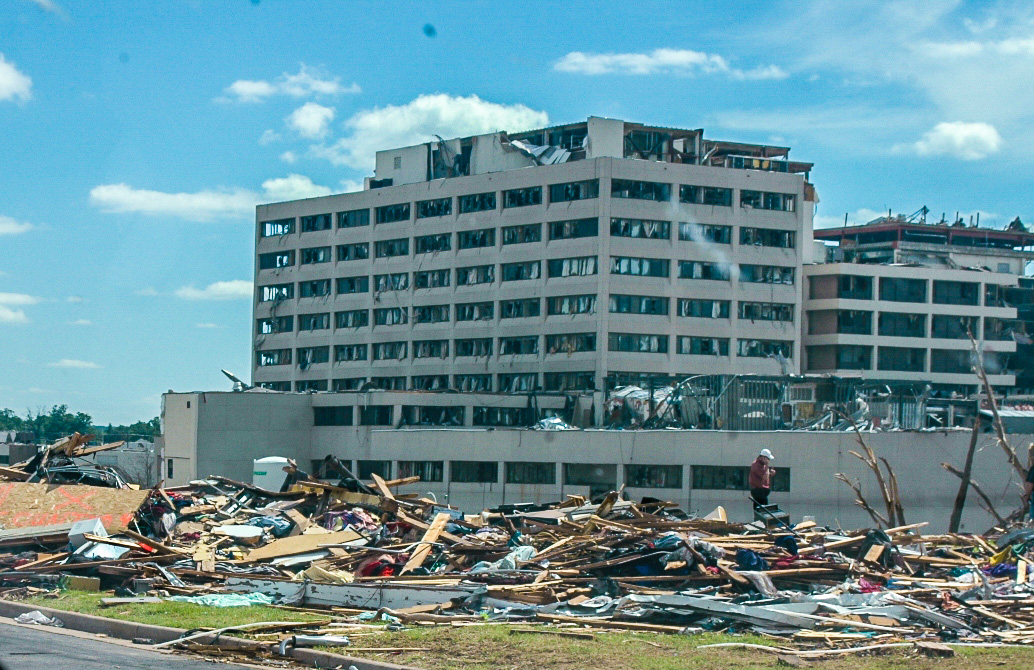
St. John's Regional Medical Center in Joplin, Missouri after the tornado

A moderate risk of severe weather was issued for much of the Midwest south to Oklahoma for May 22. The first tornadic supercell that day developed in the mid-afternoon hours over the western Twin Cities with a swath of damage, especially in and around Minneapolis, Minnesota. An intense EF2 tornado also tracked towards Harmony, Minnesota that afternoon and a tornado emergency was issued. Late that afternoon, at about 5:34 p.m. CDT (2234 UTC), a huge and abruptly powerful multiple-vortex tornado resulted in catastrophic damage in Joplin, Missouri. Many houses and businesses were flattened, and some were even blown away in Joplin. The main hospital was heavily damaged, resulting in total destruction two years after the event, the tornado's impact made the frame twist a few inches), and many people were reported to have been trapped in destroyed houses. The Weather Channel video showed entire communities flattened. Early reports suggested there were at least 125 fatalities, but the direct death toll was eventually confirmed at 158, with another 1,000+ injured. This tornado was given a rating of EF5.

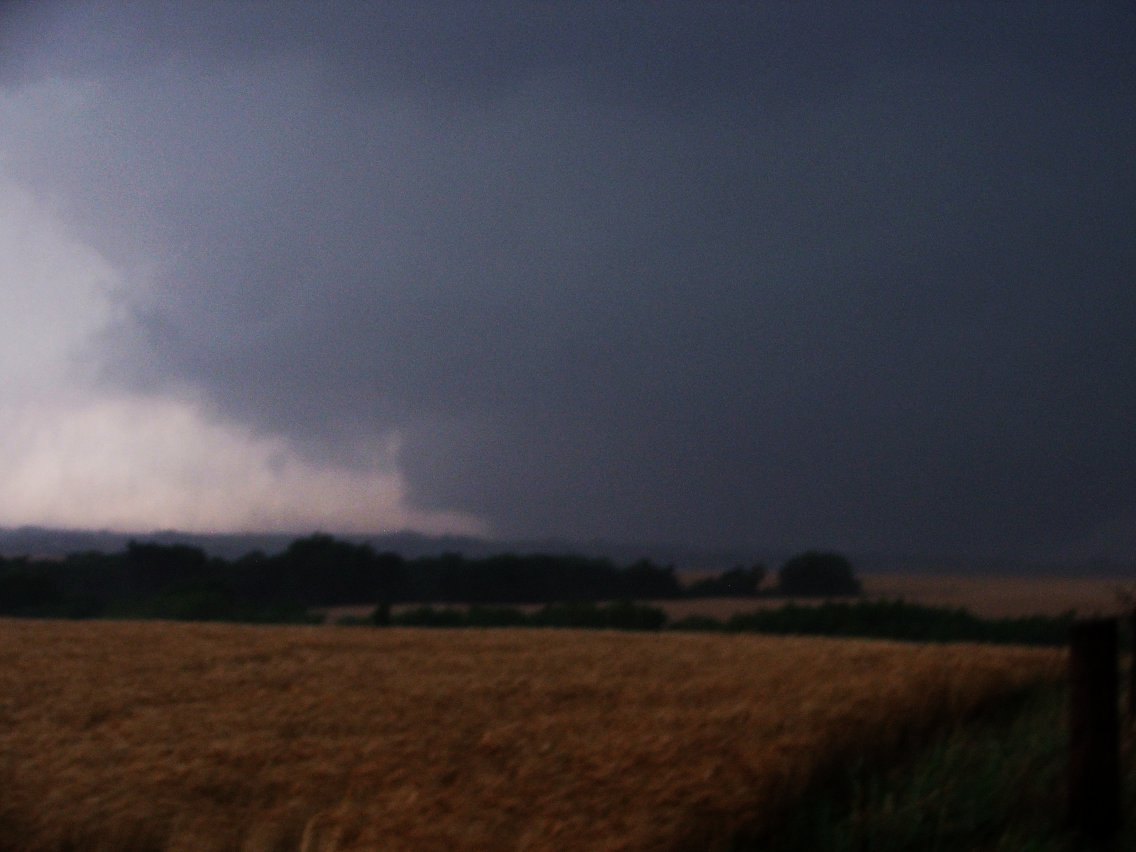
An EF5 tornado near El Reno, Oklahoma on May 24

Late in the afternoon on May 24, supercells began forming over western Kansas and Oklahoma, as the National Weather Service predicted a dangerous tornado outbreak. As a line of powerful cells began to take shape, trained spotters reported large tornadoes near El Reno, Oklahoma and in rural Grady County, Oklahoma. One of these swept from Binger to Guthrie, destroying many homes and causing at least nine fatalities. This tornado was rated an EF5, the sixth of the year and second of the outbreak sequence. Three other EF4 tornadoes developed among the many other tornadoes that day. At around 10:00 p.m. EDT on May 25, an EF3 tornado hit the city of Bedford, Indiana. U.S. Route 50 was temporarily closed due to heavy debris. A tornado reportedly formed in Keyser, WV and tracked as far as Berkeley Springs. Three tornadoes also hit the Sacramento Valley of California, north of Sacramento. One tornado—rated EF1—struck east of Artois, uprooting hundreds of almond trees and causing damage to farm equipment and roofing materials. Another tornado rated EF1 struck south of Durham, uprooting thousands of almond trees, destroying an outbuilding, and damaging a barn. The third tornado, rated EF2, struck northwest of Oroville, causing heavy damage to a ranch and a garage. On May 26, strong thunderstorms travelled through the Cumberland Valley in South Central Pennsylvania with reports of EF1 tornadoes near Carlisle, Mechanicsburg, and Hershey. Tornadoes also destroyed the setup for the Harrisburg ArtsFest scheduled to take place the following weekend.

== June ==
=== June 1 (United States) ===
EFU	EF0	EF1	EF2	EF3	EF4	EF5
0	7	4	0	1	0	0

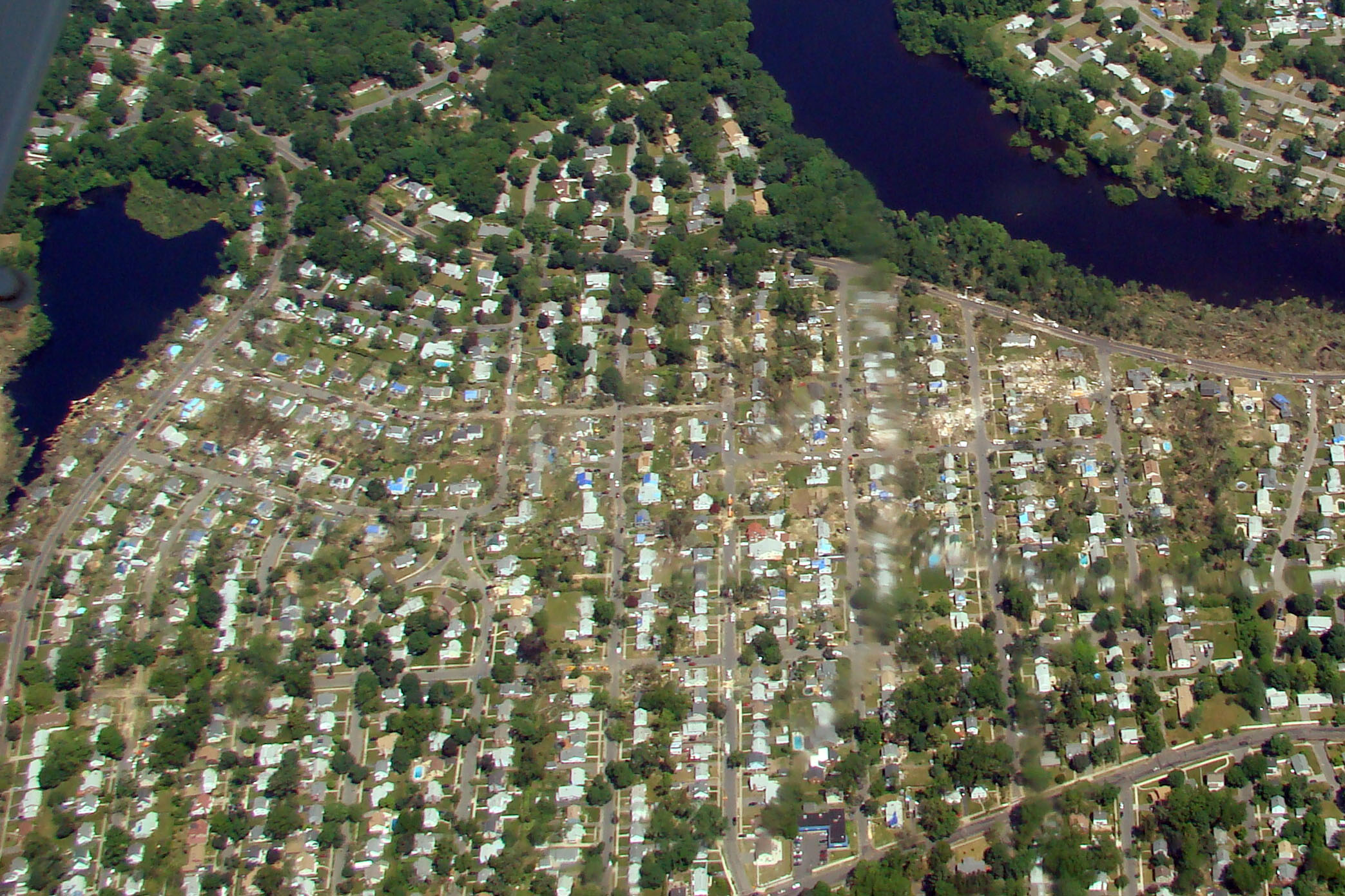
An aerial view of homes damaged in Springfield, Massachusetts after an EF3 tornado

In the Northeast, several severe thunderstorms began developing along the tail end of a cold front during the late morning hours of June 1. By the early afternoon, a tornado watch was issued for parts of Connecticut, Massachusetts, Maine, New Hampshire, New Jersey, New York, Pennsylvania and Rhode Island. A rare tornado outbreak (for the region) began late that afternoon with several tornadoes confirmed in Maine and Massachusetts.

That afternoon, an EF3 tornado occurred in downtown Springfield, Massachusetts and continued east for 39 miles devastating the towns of Westfield, Wilbraham, Monson, Brimfield, Sturbridge, Southbridge and Charlton. Major damage in the area was reported; there were some roof collapses in downtown businesses and damage to the brick structures. Numerous injuries were reported there. Significant damage was also reported in West Springfield, Monson and several other communities where houses were reported to have been destroyed or flattened. Three deaths have been directly attributed to the Springfield tornado, the first killer tornado in Massachusetts since 1995.

Several weak tornadoes also touched down across California, Nebraska and Kansas, none of which did any damage.

=== June 14 (Ukraine) ===
Severe storms produced a couple tornadoes in Ukraine, including a strong tornado in Kostiantynivka, Melitopol Raion, Zaporizhzhia Oblast, during the evening. Local and regional outlets reported approximately sixty homes damaged, widespread tree/roof damage, and power cuts to one thousand five-hundred customers. Residents described an 8–10 minute vortex that tore through several streets, and video shows a funnel crossing the Donetsk highway between Podgornoye and Zelenyy Hai. One interviewed resident from Kostiantynivka reported a concussion after being lofted by the vortex. Earlier the same day, a brief tornado hit a market area in Uzhhorod overturning stalls and scattering merchandise. Two other tornadoes were reported in Zaporizhzhia Oblast and Kharkiv Oblast.

=== June 16 (China) ===
In the afternoon of June 16, a tornado struck parts of Shantou, Guangdong. A peer-reviewed case study found the event occurred within a highly favorable environment characterized by strong vertical wind shear, a mid-tropospheric high-wind zone, positive horizontal helicity and deep positive vorticity in the middle–lower troposphere, plus a low-level convergence / upper-level divergence couplet. The paper attributes tornadogenesis to the interaction of synoptic, mesoscale, and storm-scale systems; radar showed a strong reflectivity-gradient on the cell, indicating a strong vertical-motion gradient that rapidly enhanced cyclonic rotation near the surface. Local TV reports showed roofs torn off and debris lofted as the vortex moved through urban areas. Six houses were collapsed and approximately seventy houses were damaged.

=== June 18–22 (United States) ===
EFU	EF0	EF1	EF2	EF3	EF4	EF5
0	43	21	9	5	0	0

On June 19, the Storm Prediction Center issued a moderate risk of severe weather for the Central Plains. By the evening hours, several tornadoes had occurred in rural areas. 48 tornadoes have been reported to the Storm Prediction Center.

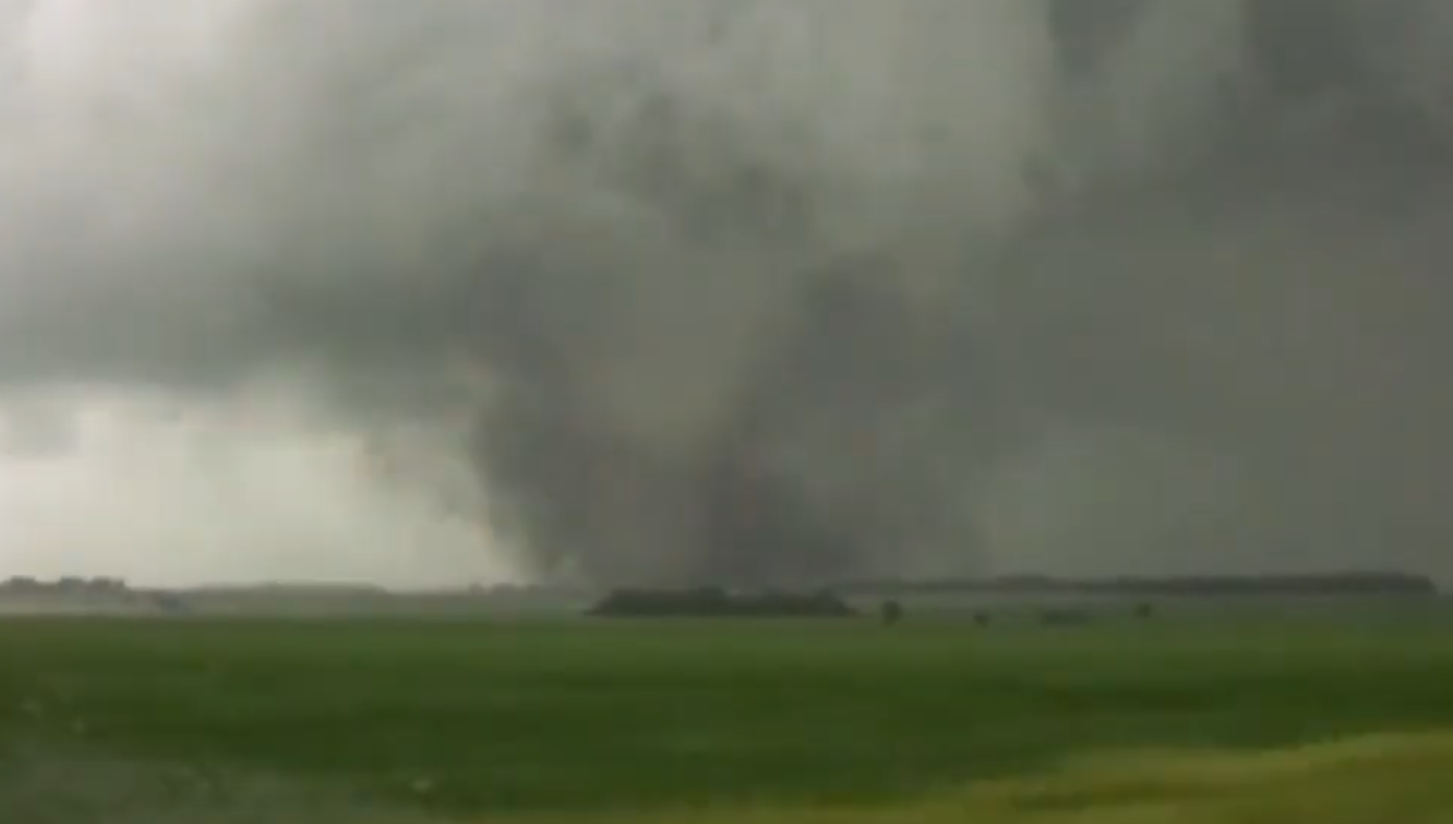
EF3 tornado in Polk County, Nebraska on June 20

During the afternoon of June 20, a PDS tornado watch was issued for much of central Nebraska and north-central Kansas due to the threat of significant tornadoes. Additionally, very large hail, at least 4 in (10 cm) in diameter, is expected within the watch area. Around 1:00 p.m. local time, storm chasers reported a large EF3 tornado on the ground north of Hill City, Kansas and again later that afternoon near Elm Creek, Nebraska. Numerous other tornadoes were reported across the region including near Ravenna and in York County, some reported to have been very large and intense, but mostly over open country. Tornado warnings are stretching from North Dakota to Kansas. Additionally, a major derecho event may develop farther south – a PDS Severe Thunderstorm Watch was issued for parts of Oklahoma and North Texas as well. On the 21st, tornado watches were issued for several areas, including central Minnesota and Wisconsin, southern Illinois and parts of Missouri, and lower Michigan. Tornadoes were reported in Anoka County, Minnesota, and Green Lake and Fond du Lac Counties in Wisconsin. Additionally, local law enforcement reported a tornado in Allegan County in Michigan, with photos taken also showing what looked like a tornado, but no damage was seen in the area, and the National Weather Service determined it to have been low hanging clouds. Meanwhile, a major derecho event impacted the Chicago Metropolitan Area. The worst damage was in Wheeling, Illinois.

A series of tornadoes tracked across the Louisville, Kentucky area late on June 22. A total of five tornadoes were confirmed in the area, including two that were rated EF2. One of the tornadoes directly hit Churchill Downs severely damaging several buildings on the site. Other significant damage was reported in several industrial parks in the metropolitan area with buildings heavily damaged. Tornadoes were also confirmed in Mississippi, Tennessee, Michigan, and Indiana.

=== June 19 (New Zealand) ===
Two tornadoes struck New Plymouth in Taranaki in the early morning, hitting the central business district and nearby residential streets. The two tornadoes tore roofs and plate-glass from city businesses (including the Grand Central Hotel), blew heavy roof tiles from St Mary's Anglican Cathedral hall, shattered windows, felled trees and signs, and caused scattered power outages; no injuries were reported. At least fifteen businesses and two dozen homes suffered damage. No official rating was assigned to either tornado.

=== June 21–22 (Europe) ===
FU	F0	F1	F2	F3	F4	F5
1	0	4	1	0	0	0

on June 21, severe storms occurred over central Europe producing a few tornadoes. In the Ore Mountains of Saxony, Germany, an F1 tornado struck the spa town of Seiffen during mid-afternoon, damaging roofs of a guest house and pool building, toppling trees, and injuring two people by flying glass during a blood-donation event. Damage reports and timing align with a 14 km (8.7 mi) of intermittent wind damage from Sorgau through Blumenau and Olbernhau toward Seiffen, though a fully continuous tornadic path could not be established. A contemporaneous local interview with Seiffen's mayor described garage roofs torn off, large sheet-metal debris lofted hundreds of meters, and brief passage of the vortex. After the implementation of the IF scale, this tornado was upgraded to an IF1.5 rating. Those same storms moved over central Bohemia in the Czech Republic produced a strong F2 tornado in Pardubice during the late afternoon. The vortex tore roofs from ten to fifteen houses, damaged factory warehouses in an industrial park, including loss of part of a roof and a wall, and downed trees and fences. Despite the structural damage, no injuries were reported. A weak, unrated tornado also occurred in County Laois, Ireland in the evening.

The following day on June 22, an afternoon round of severe storms produced multiple tornadoes tornadoes in central Germany. The most notable tornado was a confirmed F1 (now IF1.5) tornado at Altenlotheim, Hesse, which ripped tiles from an estimated twenty to thirty roofs, with some tallies as high as thirty-seven, and caused several injuries as debris struck residents and vehicles. Two other tornadoes also occurred in Germany and impacted communities between Halle (Saale) and Leipzig late in the day. The first confirmed tornado struck the villages of Gröbers and Schwoitsch in Kabelsketal, Saxony-Anhalt, where a large sheet-metal roof from a machinery firm was torn off and thrown 150 m (160 yd), damaging nearby homes and cars; additional damage extended through the industrial park near the A14, with a 169 km/h (105 mph) gust measured at the local Meteomedia station. This tornado was rated F1 (now IF1.5). Roughly 15 minutes later, another F1 (now IF1.5) tornado moved through Dölzig, Schkeuditz, Saxony, just west of Leipzig, witnessed by multiple residents. Reports noted a car trailer blown across a street and scattered tree and roof damage occurred.

=== June 29 (Belarus) ===
Two separate tornadoes struck western Belarus in the late afternoon. The first, an F1 tornado occurred near Slonim in Grodno Region in the late afternoon, where eyewitnesses and footage from Slonim TV showed intense winds tearing through the nearby village of Ryshchytsy. Several buildings sustained roof and wall damage, trees were snapped or uprooted, and a few vehicles were damaged. The event was documented by ESWD analysts as “plausible but unconfirmed,” based on photos and videos from the scene. Later the same evening, a stronger F2 tornado hit Bol'shaya Volokhva in Brest Region, destroying several roofs, partially collapsing walls, and snapping trees along its path. Two people were injured, but no fatalities were reported.

== July ==
=== July 8–10 (Russia) ===
FU	F0	F1	F2	F3	F4	F5
3	1	3	1	0	0	0

A series of severe thunderstorms produced numerous tornadoes across western Russia, several of which caused significant damage in the Chuvash Republic and Samara Oblast. On July 8, two damaging tornadoes struck Chuvashia, the strongest being a F2 tornado in Torkhlovo, which destroyed roofs, heavily damaged homes and farm buildings, and shattered windows across the village. A second, weaker F1 tornado near Moskakasy caused additional tree and roof damage and left scattered power outages. The following day, July 9, another couple tornadoes occurred farther east. Two F1 tornadoes struck Novyy Buyan and Maiskoe in Samara Oblast, damaging roofs, uprooting trees, and downing power lines, while a plausible tornado was also observed near Napol'nye Kotyaki in Chuvashia, where a large funnel cloud briefly touched down. Finally, on July 10, three additional tornadoes were sighted. One near Safonovo in Smolensk Oblast, and two in Tatarstan near Mendeleyevsk and Abdrakhmanovo. The latter events were brief and caused minimal or no confirmed damage.

=== July 13 (Germany) ===
Severe thunderstorms produced two confirmed tornadoes. In Sautorn, Bavaria a strong F2 (now IF2) tornado struck in the early evening, collapsing a riding hall, tearing roofs, and snapping power poles/lines across the area. Farther southwest on the High Rhine, a F1 (now IF1.5) tornado crossed Schmittenau, Waldshut, Baden-Württemberg in the late afternoon, downing trees and causing localized damage; video and site documentation confirm a short track.

=== July 16–17 (United States) ===
EFU	EF0	EF1	EF2	EF3	EF4	EF5
0	14	5	0	1	0	0

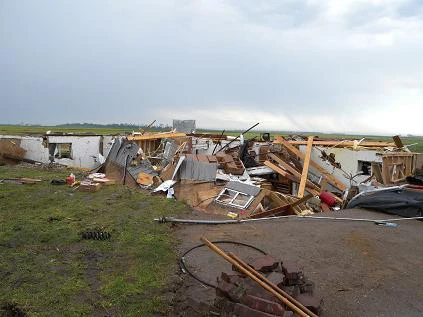
A farmhouse destroyed at EF3 intensity near Berlin, North Dakota

Numerous tornadoes formed in the Upper Midwest on both July 16 and 17 at the edge of a very hot, humid air mass. Approximately 20 tornadoes were reported, nearly all of them in North Dakota, except for one EF0 tornado in Minnesota. Most tornadoes were weak and remained over open country, but a few caused damage.

The strongest tornado occurred on July 17, as a high-end EF3 tornado damaged five farmsteads across LaMoure County, North Dakota, one of them being completely leveled near Berlin. A couple took shelter inside the basement of their farmhouse at this location and survived. Several vehicles were also thrown and left unrecognizable by this tornado. At another impacted residence, one minor injury was reported, becoming the only casualty of this two-day severe weather event.

=== July 27 (Lithuania) ===
A severe afternoon squall line produced multiple tornadoes across central and northern Lithuania, including a strong F2 tornado that struck the Šiauliai suburb of Ginkūnai and surrounding areas of Radviliškis–Šiauliai. Reports describe roofs torn off, walls damaged, widespread tree and powerline damage, and heavy objects, such as trucks and tractor trailers were lofted. Historic structures such as the Gražionys manor were badly damaged. Additional tornado activity was noted near Kėdainiai earlier in the day. The Kėdainiai event was not formally rated, but is documented by LHMS/ESSL conference materials and media recaps of the outbreak. Lithuania's national service estimated peak winds in Ginkūnai at 60 m/s (130 mph)–70 m/s (160 mph). Injuries were limited despite extensive damage.

=== July 31 (Russia) ===
A powerful F2 tornado struck the city of Blagoveshchensk, Amur Oblast in the evening, remaining on the ground for approximately thirteen minutes as it moved through several residential districts. The tornado was of such force that it crushed trees, shattered windows, overturned several 80,000 lb (36,000 kg) trucks and automobiles, and severed power lines, leaving large sections of the city without electricity. More than one hundred homes and hone hundred and fifty cars were damaged, while approximately one hundred and fifty trees were uprooted or snapped. In total, two people were killed and twenty-eight others injured, including four hospitalized with serious wounds. Damage estimates ranged from €1.2–2 million (US$1.8–2.9 million), and local authorities declared a state of emergency to accelerate recovery efforts.

== August ==
=== August 2 (Russia) ===
A strong F2 tornado struck the settlement of Podkletnoye near Voronezh around in the mid-afternoon, damaging multiple homes. Reports noted roofs blown away, shattered windows, and structural failure of at least one house where the roof and upper rooms were torn off.

=== August 10 (Oklahoma) ===
EFU	EF0	EF1	EF2	EF3	EF4	EF5
0	1	0	1	0	0	0

Early on August 10, a strong tornado (a rarity in mid-summer in Oklahoma) hit near Locust Grove, Oklahoma embedded in a larger thunderstorm complex. The tornado destroyed a mobile home killing one person (the first killer tornado since June 1 in the US) and injuring two others. The tornado was rated as an EF2.

=== August 11 (Nebraska) ===
EFU	EF0	EF1	EF2	EF3	EF4	EF5
0	5	1	0	1	0	0

During the evening of August 11, an intense EF3 tornado touched down south-southeast of Wood Lake in Cherry County, Nebraska, briefly crossed into Brown County, then dissipated. The tornado reached a peak width of roughly a half-mile and stayed on the ground for twenty minutes, ripping through shelterbelts and destroying windmills. A large tree was debarked, uprooted, and moved, and a steel culvert was thrown about 0.75 mi (1.21 km), which was consistent with low-end EF3 winds. No deaths or injuries were reported. 6 other weak tornadoes occurred in Nebraska as well.

=== August 13 (China) ===
An EF2 tornado struck Jinhu County, Jiangsu, damaging one hundred four houses, twelve of which collapsed and snapped or blew down over approximately one thousand trees.

=== August 19 (United States) ===
EFU	EF0	EF1	EF2	EF3	EF4	EF5
0	1	1	0	0	0	0

In the late afternoon of August 19, a fatal EF1 tornado struck Wausaukee, Wisconsin. On the ground for about fifteen minutes, the tornado snapped or uprooted hundreds of trees, damaging several buildings, and destroying a mobile home, where a man was killed. An EF0 tornado also struck Ontonagon, Michigan earlier in the day, causing weak damage in town.

=== August 21 (United States and Canada) ===
EFU	EF0	EF1	EF2	EF3	EF4	EF5
0	0	1	1	1	0	0

A tornadic waterspout formed late in the afternoon over Lake Huron, coming ashore at Goderich, Ontario. The tornado struck the downtown area nearly directly with severe damage. Many buildings were damaged or destroyed in the community by the tornado, the strongest in Ontario since 1996. There are early reports of 2 other tornadoes in the region. At least 37 people were injured and a 61-year-old worker at a salt mine was killed as winds of 300 km/h (190 mph; 160 kn) raged. The storm was rated an F3 tornado by Environment Canada. An EF2 tornado was also confirmed in western New York, near Conquest and an EF1 tornado occurred in Grafton County, New Hampshire.

=== August 22 (Poland) ===
A strong F2 tornado struck the villages of Rudnik and Wierzbica in Krasnystaw County, Lublin Voivodeship, during the evening. The tornado damaged or destroyed multiple homes, barns, and farm buildings, tearing off roofs, snapping trees, and scattering debris across open fields. Local and regional authorities reported that dozens of structures were damaged, though no fatalities occurred. Post-event analyses and photographic evidence suggested a track length of several kilometers with T4/F2-level damage intensity.

=== August 25 (Russia) ===
A fatal tornado hit a tent camp on the Mrassu about 40 km (25 mi) from Ust'-Kabyrza in Kemerovo Oblast. The tornado tore through a small grove, snapping large firs and flattening a 100 m (110 yd) – 100 m area. Two trees fell onto a tent, killing a 31-year-old woman from Novosibirsk. At least five others were injured, including a pregnant woman and three children scalded when a soup cauldron overturned, and a man struck by a falling tree. One person who was injured was later airlifted to Novosibirsk for treatment.

== September ==
=== September 3–7 (Tropical Storm Lee) ===
EFU	EF0	EF1	EF2	EF3	EF4	EF5
0	21	9	0	0	0	0

Slow-moving Tropical Storm Lee resulted in at least 55 tornado reports along the immediate northern Gulf Coast beginning on September 3 and into September 4, inching inland on the afternoon of September 4. Several areas of damage, some significant, was reported from central Louisiana to the western Florida Panhandle.

A moderate risk of severe weather, a rare occurrence when associated with a tropical cyclone, was issued for September 5 in Alabama and Georgia, with numerous tornadoes possible. The most concentrated tornadic activity that day took place in northern and central Georgia, particularly around Atlanta. In addition, an EF1 tornado associated with an unrelated cold front occurred in Amsterdam, New York. The tornadoes resulted in three injuries.

=== September 20 (Greece) ===
A likely waterspout made landfall and struck Vlycho on the island of Lefkada, capsizing and damaging numerous boats in the harbor and boatyard and causing extensive damage along the waterfront. The storm lasted roughly ten minutes and resulted in one fatality, a French tourist drowned after his boat overturned during the event. Multiple local outlets published video and next-day damage photos from the scene. This tornado never received an official rating.

== October ==
=== October 2–3 (South Africa) ===
On October 2, a strong and deadly F2 tornado struck Duduza, East Rand, Gauteng, in the early evening. The South African Weather Service surveyed the damage and rated it F2; hundreds of homes were destroyed or severely damaged. One fatality was reported along with over one hundred fifty injuries. Despite the F2 rating from the SAWS, AfriWX, a private weather compilation site, lists the event as F4 in its historical summary of South African tornadoes. However, this source does not cite an official re-analysis by SAWS. Given the absence of an official upgrade, most contemporaneous government and relief reporting references the F2 assessment by SAWS.

The following day on October 3, a strong F2 tornado hit Ficksburg, Free State, killing one and injuring dozens while damaging over a hundred houses.

== November ==
=== November 7–8 (United States) ===
EFU	EF0	EF1	EF2	EF3	EF4	EF5
0	12	7	1	0	1	0

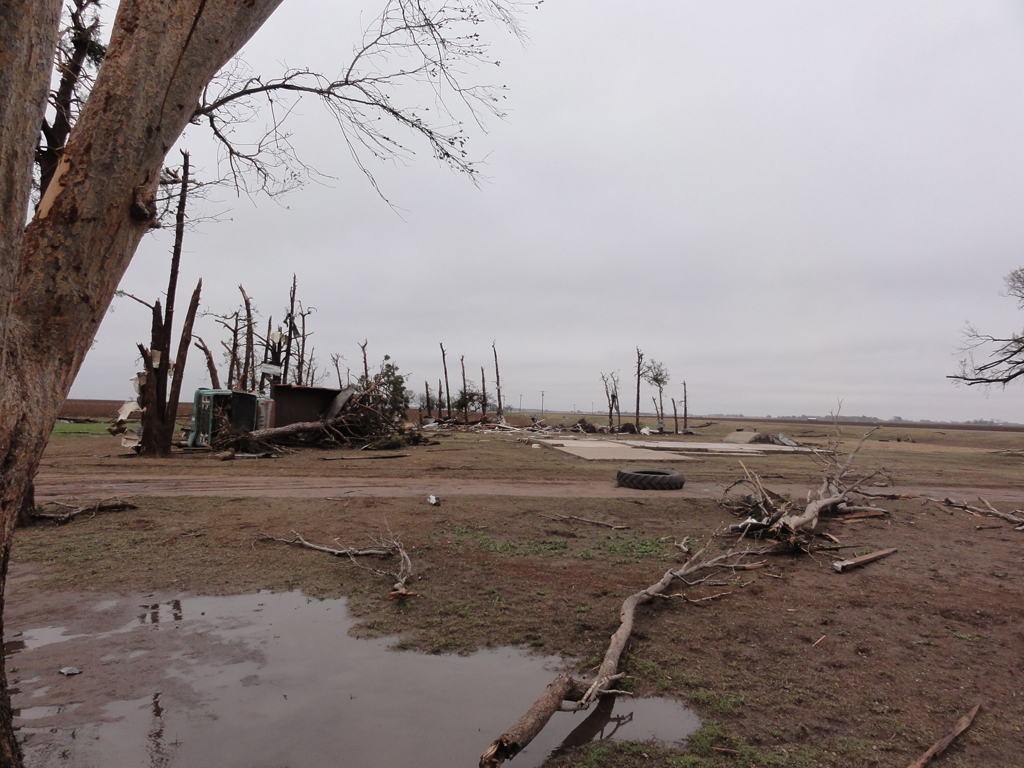
EF4 damage at a research station near Tipton, Oklahoma

A series of tornadoes transpired across the south-central United States, particularly Texas, Oklahoma, and Louisiana, on November 7 and 8 as a storm system tracked across the region. A total of 21 tornadoes were confirmed across the region, causing sporadic damage. One of the tornadoes was rated as an EF4, destroying the Oklahoma State University agronomy research station near Tipton, the first F4 or EF4 tornado in Oklahoma in the month of November since records began in 1950. Most of the tornadoes, however, remained in very rural areas, mainly impacting trees and forested areas. No fatalities or injuries were reported with the tornadoes.

=== November 14–16 (United States) ===
EFU	EF0	EF1	EF2	EF3	EF4	EF5
0	8	9	7	0	0	0

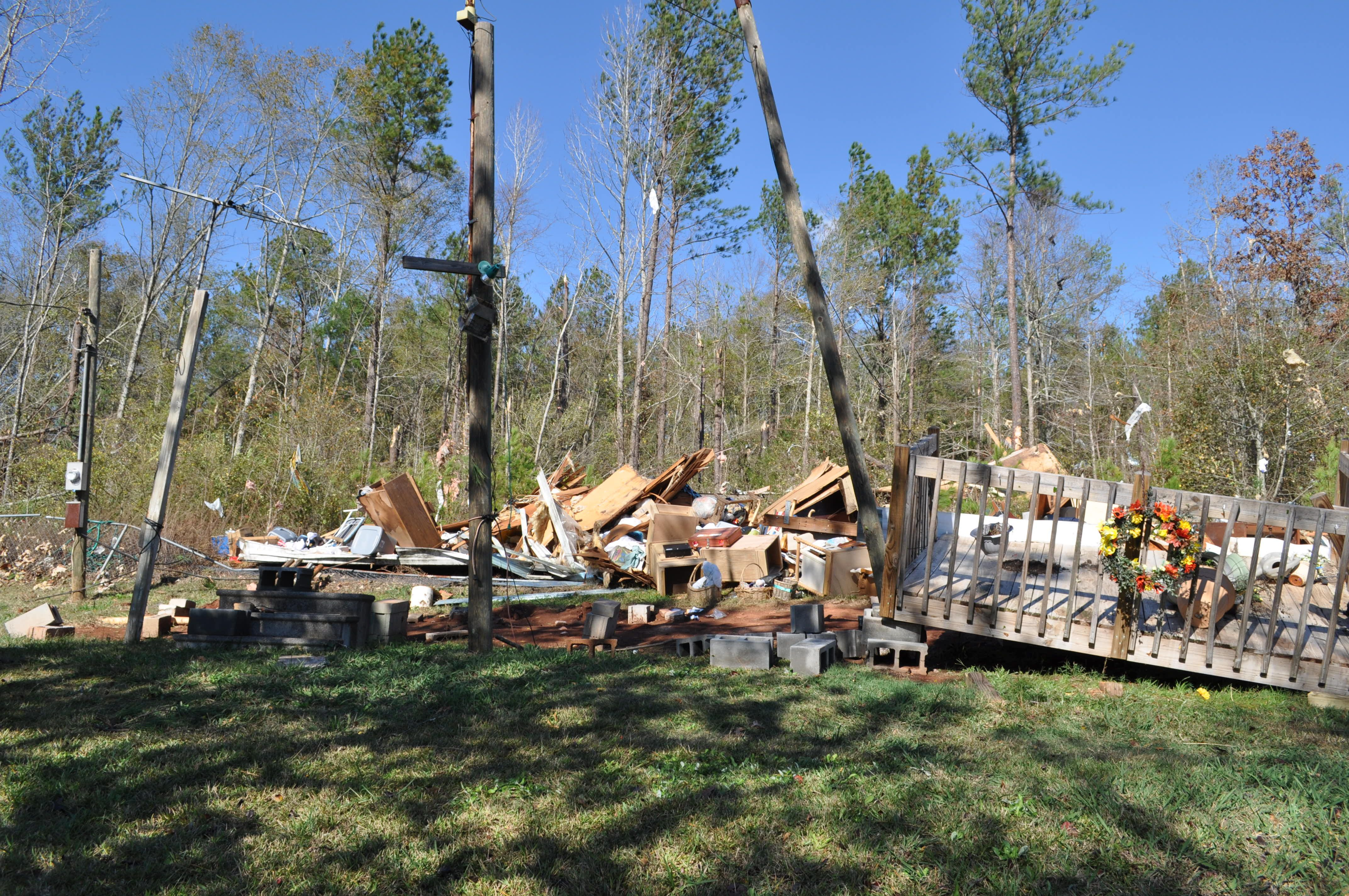
A mobile home that was destroyed by an EF2 tornado in Hamilton, Georgia

Several tornadoes occurred across the United States beginning the afternoon of November 14 and continuing through November 16. On November 14, two EF2 tornadoes were confirmed in southwestern New York, a rare occurrence there so late in the year, while another tornado struck Paoli, Indiana, causing considerable damage in downtown. After a brief tornado on November 15 in San Jacinto County, Texas, numerous tornadoes struck the Southern United States throughout the day on November 16, resulting in severe damage and injuries.

A total of 20 tornadoes occurred on November 16 in a small but deadly outbreak. Some tornadoes caused considerable damage, especially in Mississippi, Alabama, and the Carolinas. A series of supercell thunderstorms developed and produced multiple tornadoes. Five tornadoes were rated EF2, one of which destroyed multiple homes near Laurel, Mississippi, and injured 15 people. An EF1 tornado west of Tangipahoa, Louisiana heavily damaged a home and pushed it several feet off of its foundation. During the afternoon, one long-track tornado began southwest of Auburn, Alabama and travelled 61 miles (98 km) across the Georgia state line into the Hamilton area. This tornado caused EF1-level damage in Auburn and EF2 damage in Hamilton. Four people were injured by the tornado: two in Auburn and two in Hamilton. A deadly tornado later formed near Rock Hill, South Carolina, causing severe damage and three fatalities. Another destructive EF2 tornado developed east of Linwood, North Carolina, and impacted residential and commercial areas south of Thomasville. Numerous homes and businesses were destroyed, two people were killed, and several people were trapped in destroyed structures and required rescue. Over 75 structures were damaged or destroyed by the tornado. A sixth fatality, due to straight-line winds, occurred in Forsyth County, Georgia.

=== November 18 (Japan) ===
On the evening of November 18, a tornado rated F2 struck the island of Tokunoshima in Ōshima District, Kagoshima Prefecture. The tornado completely destroyed one home and caused additional non-residential damage, killing three people. A Japan Meteorological Agency field investigation cites debris and eyewitness accounts (a brief, loud “roaring” sound) and notes a passenger car was lofted >20 m (22 yd), consistent with F2 intensity under a stationary front with warm-air advection over the East China Sea.

== December ==
=== December 20–22 (United States) ===
EFU	EF0	EF1	EF2	EF3	EF4	EF5
0	7	6	1	1	0	0

After a lull in activity, fifteen tornadoes were confirmed across Louisiana, Alabama, and Georgia from December 20 to December 22, making up all of the United States tornado activity during the month. The strongest of the tornadoes, which was rated EF3, occurred in Georgia on December 22, and resulted in severe damage in parts of Floyd and Gordon counties, including houses destroyed. Four people were injured in Gordon County, and three others were injured by an EF2 tornado near Rome. Most of the tornadoes in Alabama were rated EF0, although one EF1 tornado tracked 25 miles (40 km) across three counties, causing widespread tree damage.

=== December 25 (Australia) ===
The outer north-western suburbs of Melbourne, Australia were hit by three reported tornadoes on Christmas Day after a series of severe thunderstorms moved through the city. The first tornado was reported in Fiskville, approximately 15 km west of Bacchus Marsh. The second was reported in the city of Melton. Another tornado was reported in Taylors Lakes. The storms and tornadoes were accompanied with extremely heavy rainfall, flash flooding, high winds and tennis ball-sized hail.

== See also ==
- Tornado
  - Tornadoes by year
  - Tornado records
  - Tornado climatology
  - Tornado myths
- List of tornado outbreaks
  - List of F5 and EF5 tornadoes
  - List of F4 and EF4 tornadoes
    - List of F4 and EF4 tornadoes (2010–2019)
  - List of North American tornadoes and tornado outbreaks
  - List of 21st-century Canadian tornadoes and tornado outbreaks
  - List of European tornadoes and tornado outbreaks
  - List of tornadoes and tornado outbreaks in Asia
  - List of Southern Hemisphere tornadoes and tornado outbreaks
  - List of tornadoes striking downtown areas
  - List of tornadoes with confirmed satellite tornadoes
- Tornado intensity
  - Fujita scale
  - Enhanced Fujita scale
  - International Fujita scale
  - TORRO scale
