= 2011 Sanford–Raleigh tornado =

2011 EF3 tornado in North Carolina, U.S.

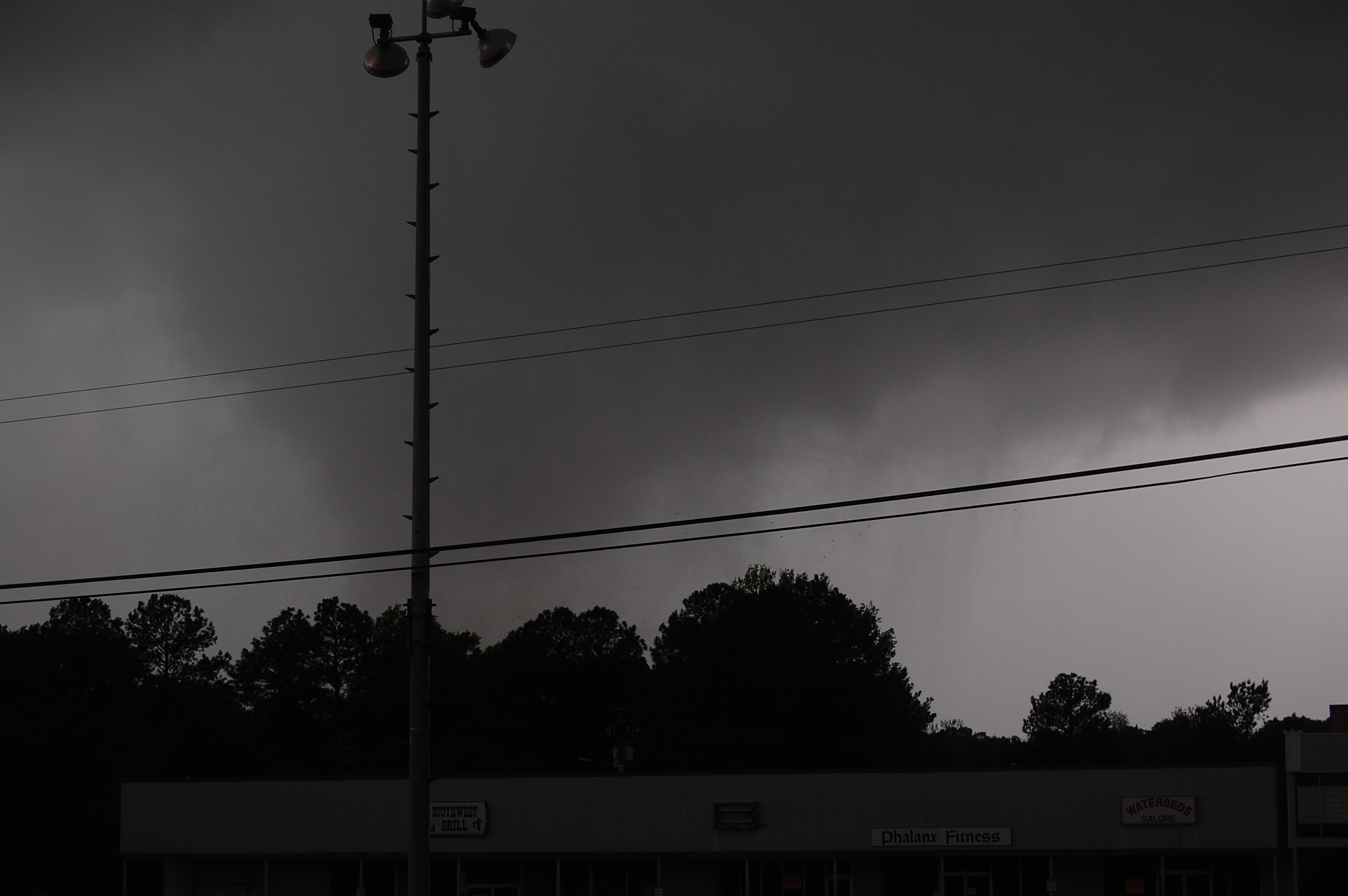
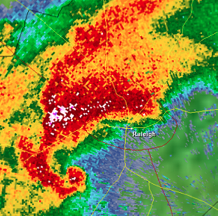
- Top: the tornado as it was tracking through Sanford; Bottom: a reflectivity scan of the tornado

Meteorological history
- Formed: April 16, 2011, 2:53 p.m. EDT (UTC−05:00)
- Dissipated: April 16, 2011, 4:15 p.m. EDT(UTC−05:00)
- Duration: 1 hour, 22 minutes

EF3 tornado
- on the Enhanced Fujita scale
- Max width: 528 yards (0.300 mi; 0.483 km)
- Path length: 67 miles (108 km)
- Highest winds: 160 mph (260 km/h)

Overall effects
- Fatalities: 6
- Injuries: 103
- Damage: $172 Million (2011 USD)
- Areas affected: Moore, Lee (Lemon Springs and Sanford), and Wake (Holly Springs and Raleigh) counties, North Carolina.
- Houses destroyed: ~2,270 damaged
- Part of the Tornado outbreak of April 14–16, 2011 and Tornadoes of 2011

During the Afternoon hours of April 16, 2011, a deadly and long-tracked high end EF3 would severely impact the communities of Sanford, Eastern portions of Raleigh, and many other towns in Moore County, Lee County, and Wake County. Along 67 mile (108 km), path it would destroy and damage around 2,270 homes were destroyed and 67 were completely destroyed by consistent windspeed's of 110 miles per hour (180 km/h) and 140 miles per hour (230 km/h), but windspeed's peaked at 160 miles per hour (260 km/h). The tornado killed 6 people and injured 103, making it the 7th deadliest tornado in North Carolina history, and also the costliest, costing $172 Million United States dollars. It was part of a wider Severe weather outbreak from April 14-16 impacting the North Carolina and surrounding states.

== Meteorological synopsis ==
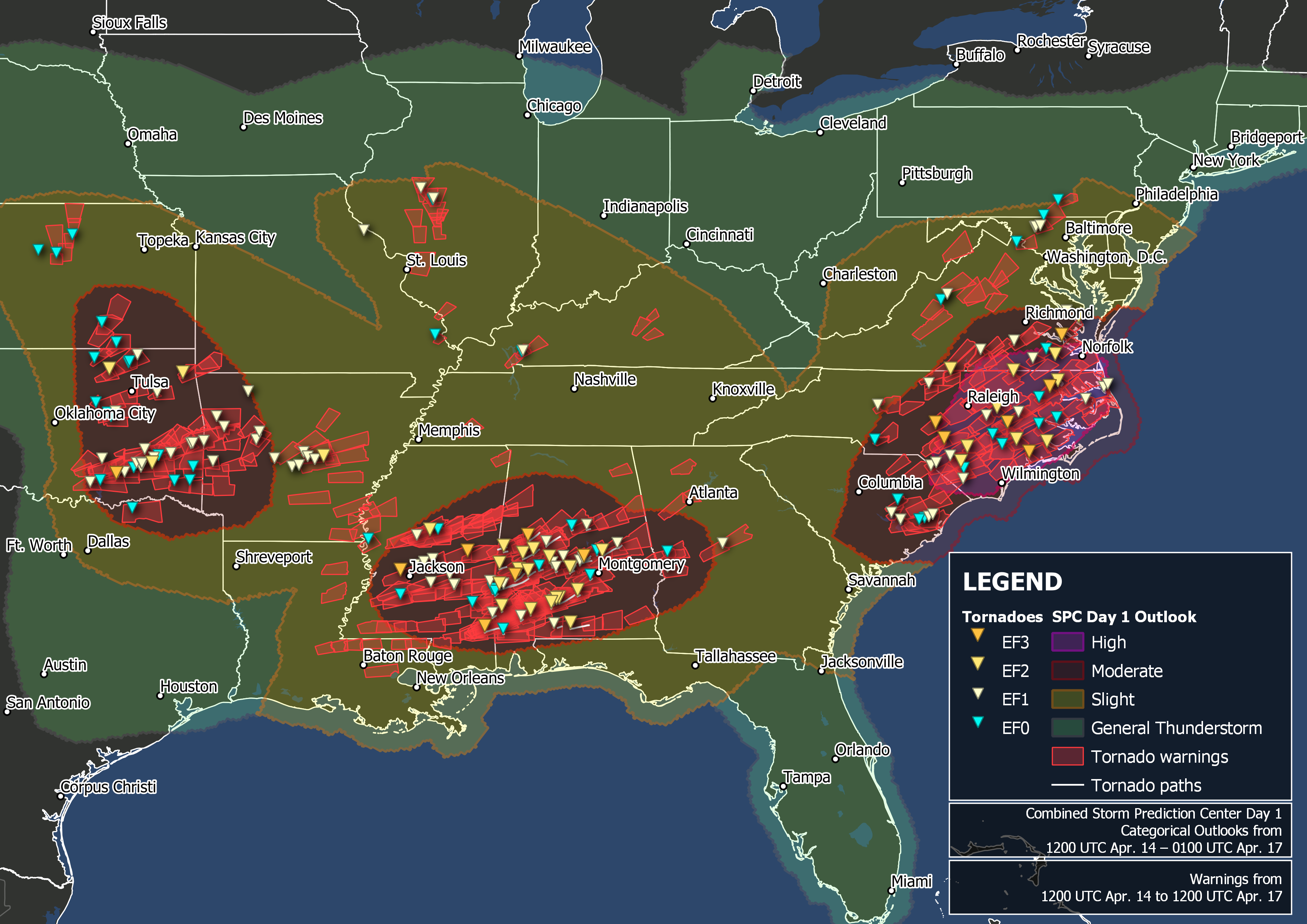
The Storm Prediction Center’s Severe Weather Outlook for April 14-16, 2011

Early on April 16, 2011, a powerful upper-level trough—an elongated region of low atmospheric pressure aloft—advanced eastward across the central United States and took on a negative tilt, becoming oriented northwest to southeast. As this deep upper-level disturbance advanced, it induced strong positive vorticity advection and intense dynamic lift over the southeastern United States, providing the broad synoptic framework for the largest tornado outbreak in North Carolina history. In response to this potent trough, an intense extratropical cyclone deepened as it moved over the Ohio Valley, forcing an associated surface cold front across the Appalachian Mountains during the morning hours of April 16, 2011. Concurrently, a localized Warm front lifted rapidly northward across central North Carolina. This boundary served as a key conduit for a warm, exceptionally moist maritime tropical air mass originating from the Gulf of Mexico to penetrate inland across the eastern Piedmont.

Rapid moisture advection caused surface dew points to surge into the mid-to-upper 60s °F (around 18°C), while robust afternoon solar insolation cleared residual morning cloud cover. This rapid warming combined with steep lapse rates to severely destabilize the Boundary layer. Consequently, Convective available potential energy (CAPE) values expanded dramatically within a very brief window prior to convective initiation, providing the extreme buoyant energy required to fuel violent thunderstorm updrafts.

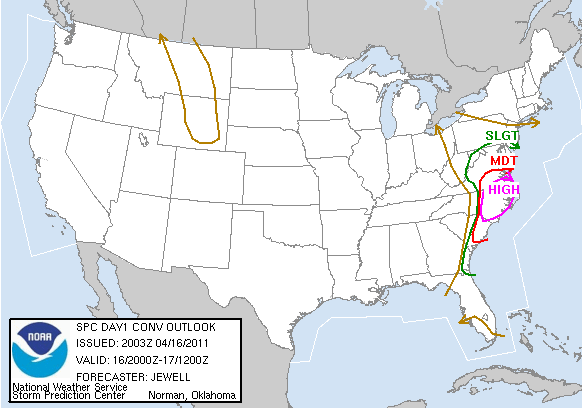
A high risk of severe weather was issued on April 16 for most of eastern North Carolina, and parts of southeast Virginia and northeast South Carolina

Recognizing the hazardous intersection of high instability and extreme kinematics, the Storm Prediction Center (SPC) upgraded central North Carolina and southern Virginia to a rare Category 5 "High Risk" severe weather outlook in their 1300 UTC convective update. This denoted a maximum 30% hatched probability for tornadoes within 25 miles of any given point, underscoring the threat of long-tracked, violent tornadoes. It represented the first High Risk ever issued by the SPC for portions of central and eastern North Carolina since the implementation of the modern categorical categorization system, and the first maximum-tier outlook covering the region since the March 1984 Carolinas tornado outbreak. Shortly thereafter, the SPC instituted a Particularly Dangerous Situation (PDS) Tornado watch for the region, highlighting a greater than 95% probability for multiple intense tornadoes.

While the thermodynamic profile grew increasingly explosive, the kinematic variables across central North Carolina were profoundly supportive of intense low-level atmospheric rotation. Upper-air analysis revealed a dual jet structure, highlighted by a powerful 90-knot (105 mph) mid-level core rounding the base of the advancing trough. This setup generated deep-layer vertical bulk shear exceeding 50 to 60 knots. Simultaneously, a robust 50-knot Low-level jet stream dramatically backed surface winds ahead of the cold front, creating highly elongated, clockwise hodographs and extreme Storm-relative helicity (SRH) values ranging between 500 and 800 m²/s².

Initially, an organized, pre-frontal Squall line initiated over western North Carolina and moved rapidly eastward, outrunning the slower cold front Typically, extreme vertical wind shear acts detrimentally on immature convective cells trying to establish themselves ahead of a primary linear complex by physically ripping their updrafts apart. However, the immense synoptic-scale lift along the warm frontal boundary sustained the system. As the squall line moved directly into the high-instability, high-SRH environment of the eastern Piedmont, the minimal line-normal shear forced a radical structural transformation. Instead of remaining a linear system, the squall line fractured and segmented into a series of distinct, discrete, and long-lived supercell thunderstorms that maximized the ambient low-level helicity, setting the stage for the tornadogenesis of the tornado.

== Tornado summary ==
=== Touchdown in Moore County ===
The tornado touched down at 2:53 p.m. EDT (18:53 UTC) on April 16, 2011, in a densely forested area of northern Moore County. The funnel was first observed near the intersection of Red Hill Road and Gilchrist Road, approximately two miles west-southwest of Cameron. Initial damage along the narrow, 50-yard-wide path was rated EF0, consisting of snapped pine tree limbs, uprooted softwoods, and minor roof damage to agricultural barns and sheds.

The mesocyclone rapidly organized as the tornado accelerated northeastward at approximately 50 mph (80 km/h). The widening vortex crossed U.S. Route 1 near Wildlife Road, intensifying to EF1 strength. At this location, the tornado struck an unanchored single-wide mobile home, completely removing the structure from its foundation.

The home's framing and subfloors were destroyed, and its metal frame chassis was thrown over 150 yards into an adjacent pasture. An adjacent traditional wood-frame house sustained severe structural damage, losing its front porch and substantial portions of its roof covering. Airborne debris from the site damaged nearby outbuildings and vehicles. The tornado then crossed the county line into southwestern Lee County.

==== intensification through Lemon Springs ====
Upon entering Lee County, the tornado encountered an environment characterized by convective available potential energy (CAPE) values exceeding 1,500 J/kg and strong low-level wind shear. The vortex rapidly intensified and expanded into a large, rain-wrapped multi-vortex wedge tornado. The tornado peaked at high-end EF3 intensity, with maximum winds estimated by forensic engineers at 160 mph (260 km/h).

The most severe damage occurred in the St. Andrews subdivision along Lemon Springs Road. Multiple well-built, two-story single-family homes with brick veneers were completely leveled. Engineering surveys noted that the floor joists and plywood subfloors were torn clean from the foundation anchor bolts, leaving swept concrete slabs on the worst-affected properties.

Debris from the homes was pulverized and lofted into the storm's updraft. Trees throughout the subdivision were completely debarked and stripped of branches.

One motorist was killed along Lemon Springs Road when the tornado lofted their vehicle from a driveway and threw it over 100 meters into an adjacent field. This was the sole direct fatality recorded in Lee County during the outbreak, though emergency medical personnel treated more than 35 residents for severe injuries. On the periphery of the subdivision, several commercial properties sustained major structural damage, including collapsed masonry walls and blown-out windows.

==== Sanford ====
Maintaining its high-end EF3 strength, the widening tornado expanded to a continuous damage track width of nearly a quarter-mile (440 yards) as it directly impacted the southern industrial manufacturing centers and other businesses in Sanford. Upon striking the multi-family residential developments along Cameron Drive, the tornado violently tore off the complete upper stories of two large, multi-unit brick-veneer apartment buildings. This severe structural breaching exposed interior lower-floor living quarters to the elements, ripped away internal ceiling insulation, and picked up furniture, appliances, and other items directly into the streets.

The tornado then tore directly into a high-density industrial manufacturing complex located along Industrial Drive, inflicting severe structural damage to the global corporate headquarters of Static Control Components. Three large engineered sheet-metal warehouses were severely damaged and compressed, and peeled apart by intense pressure differentials. Heavy steel I-beam support pillars and structural arches were twisted, and in several instances torn directly out of their reinforced concrete ground footings. Debris from the industrial park, ranging from lightweight sheet metal shards to heavy mechanical components, was carried high into the atmosphere and deposited several miles northeastward. Engineering assessments subsequently conducted by meteorologists and structural experts confirmed that wind velocities within this pocket remained consistently at high-end EF3 strength, matching or exceeding 160 mph (260 km/h).

Continuing its northeast heading, the tornado crossed the right-of-way of South Horner Boulevard (U.S. Route 421) and made a direct hit on a major commercial shopping plaza containing a Lowe's Home Improvement warehouse center, a Tractor Supply Company outlet, and a Big Lots store. The tornado made a direct hit on the eastern exterior, causing the cinderblock walls of the Lowe's facility tocollapse inward, triggering a chain-reaction structural failure that brought down approximately two-thirds of the facility's expansive, large-span steel bar roof grid. Dozens of passenger vehicles parked in the adjacent parking lot were tossed across the property and were severely damaged.

Inside the retail facility, active store manager Michael Hollowell observed the tornado rapidly approaching and engulfing the neighboring Tractor Supply store. Hollowell utilized the store's public address system to order an emergency evacuation of all active customer zones and sales floors. Hollowell and his floor staff successfully directed approximately 60 customers and 50 on-duty employees into the windowless interior rear storage corridors and concrete-reinforced lumber delivery alcoves just moments before the front entryway was entirely crushed by debris. While the heavy metal roof structure peeled off directly over their heads and concrete wall blocks collapsed into inventory bays, the reinforced interior structural walls held firm. This resulted in zero fatalities and no life-threatening injuries among the 110 individuals taking shelter inside. The narrow escape was cited by emergency management personnel as an example of corporate disaster preparedness and command execution under duress.

The tornado then crossed NC 42, striking a large agricultural distribution facility and demolishing 40 specialized outbuildings, multi-ton harvesting tractors, and mechanical tobacco combines, scattering farm equipment across several nearby fields. North of the highway along Rice Road, two homes were lifted completely off their foundations and thrown in nearby woodlots. Before exiting the Sanford municipal limits, the core struck and heavily damaged several mobile homes along Poplar Spring Church Road, leaving several unanchored structures as completely flattened debris fields.

==== Weakening through Broadway and Chatham County ====
Upon approaching the northern boundaries of Lee County, the tornado would weaken exponentially, it was now at EF0 strength as it traveled across southeastern areas of Chatham County near the town of Broadway. At EF0 intensity it caused extensive asphalt shingle loss along Avent Ferry Road, snapped tree branches, broken utility poles, and collapsed wooden fencing.

After crossing the Cape Fear River, where it would snap and uproot large sections of trees and created a visible scar through the forest. The tornado crossed into southwestern Wake County just east of Harris Lake. it passed within two miles of the Shearon Harris Nuclear Power Plant. Although the reinforced concrete reactor containment structures were designed to withstand severe weather, peripheral high-voltage transmission towers suffered structural failures and major pole snaps. These transmission failures triggered localized circuit switch disruptions across the regional power grid, forcing automated safety re-routing of electricity throughout the surrounding municipal networks.

==== Holly Springs ====
As it entered Holly Springs it was at EF0 strength with 86 mph winds (138 km/h), the tornado entered the town limits of Holly Springs. The western edge of the tornado struck the Wake County Fire Station No. 2 along Avery Top Road, causing significant metal wall framing separation and buckling the main aluminum overhead bay doors inward, which temporarily pinned emergency rescue inside the station house. The tornado then tracked a continuous path of property damage through the highly populated residential sectors of the Holly Glenn and Remington subdivisions. Dozens of multi-story homes sustained roof and exterior failures, and shattered window glass, and blown garage doors. The tornado maintained EF1 strength across Pierce Olive Road and Ten-Ten Road near the intersection of Lawdraker Road, dropping material timber onto roofs in the Halstead subdivision and causing significant structural damage.

It then tracked directly through the Hunters Bluff neighborhood along Penny Road, crossing Olde South and Yates Mill Pond Roads, and falling heavy hardwood trees onto homes in the Oakton and Olde Mill Forest subdivisions before crossing the northwestern shoreline of Lake Wheeler, where witnesses reported a prominent spray shroud rising from the lake's surface.

=== Raleigh ===
At 3:50 p.m. EDT, the National Weather Service in Raleigh saw the tornado looking to make a direct hit on Raleigh, which prompted a rare tornado emergency for the state capital as the parent supercell advanced directly toward the vulnerable city center. The tornado maintained a distinct path between 50 and 100 yards wide at EF1 intensity as it crossed the southern junction of Interstate 40 and Interstate 440 between exits 297 and 298, near the busy South Saunders Street interchange.

Accelerating into the downtown Raleigh, the tornado tracked directly through the Boylan Heights neighborhood and the Shaw University campus. At Shaw University, the winds tore the roofs off multiple brick structures, including the Tupper Memorial Baptist Church and the Willie E. Gary Student Center, forcing the university to cancel the remainder of its academic semester due to severe damage done to campus facilities. Hundreds of century-old oak trees throughout downtown Raleigh were uprooted or snapped, damaging parked vehicles and completely blocking major roads like South Wilmington Street and Person Street.

The tornado underwent re-intensification to EF2 strength as it exited the downtown area and struck the high-density residential and commercial areas along New Bern Avenue (U.S. Route 64). The tornado made a direct hit on a medical supply warehouse and a shopping strip center, tearing away large concrete fascia panels and causing severe damage to an adjacent trailer park.

The most severe localized devastation within the Raleigh metropolitan area occurred further northeast in the Stony Brook subdivision, located just off Capital Boulevard (U.S. Route 1). In this neighborhood, The tornado at EF2 Strength completely removed the roofs and top floors of several wood-frame apartment complexes and manufactured homes, resulting in dozens of severe injuries and four localized fatalities when structures collapsed on sheltering residents. The tornado finally began a permanent weakening trend as it crossed the Neuse River, tracking into rural Johnston County at EF0 strength before completely dissipating near Smithfield at 4:15 p.m. EDT (20:15 UTC).

== See also ==
- Tornado outbreak of April 14-16, 2011
