= Podkletnoye =

Podkletnoye Подклетное
- Selo
- Location within Voronezh Oblast Location within Russia
- Coordinates: 51°35′N 39°27′E
- Country: Russia
- Region: Voronezh Oblast
- District: Novousmansky District
- Time zone: UTC+3:00

Podkletnoye (Russian: Подклетное) is a rural locality (a selo) in Usmanskoye 2-ye Rural Settlement, Novousmansky District, Voronezh Oblast, Russia. The population was 179 as of 2010. There are 13 streets.

== Geography ==
Podkletnoye is located 9 km southeast of Novaya Usman (the district's administrative centre) by road. Parusnoye is the nearest rural locality.
