= Midland Continental Railroad =

North Dakota short line (1906–1966)

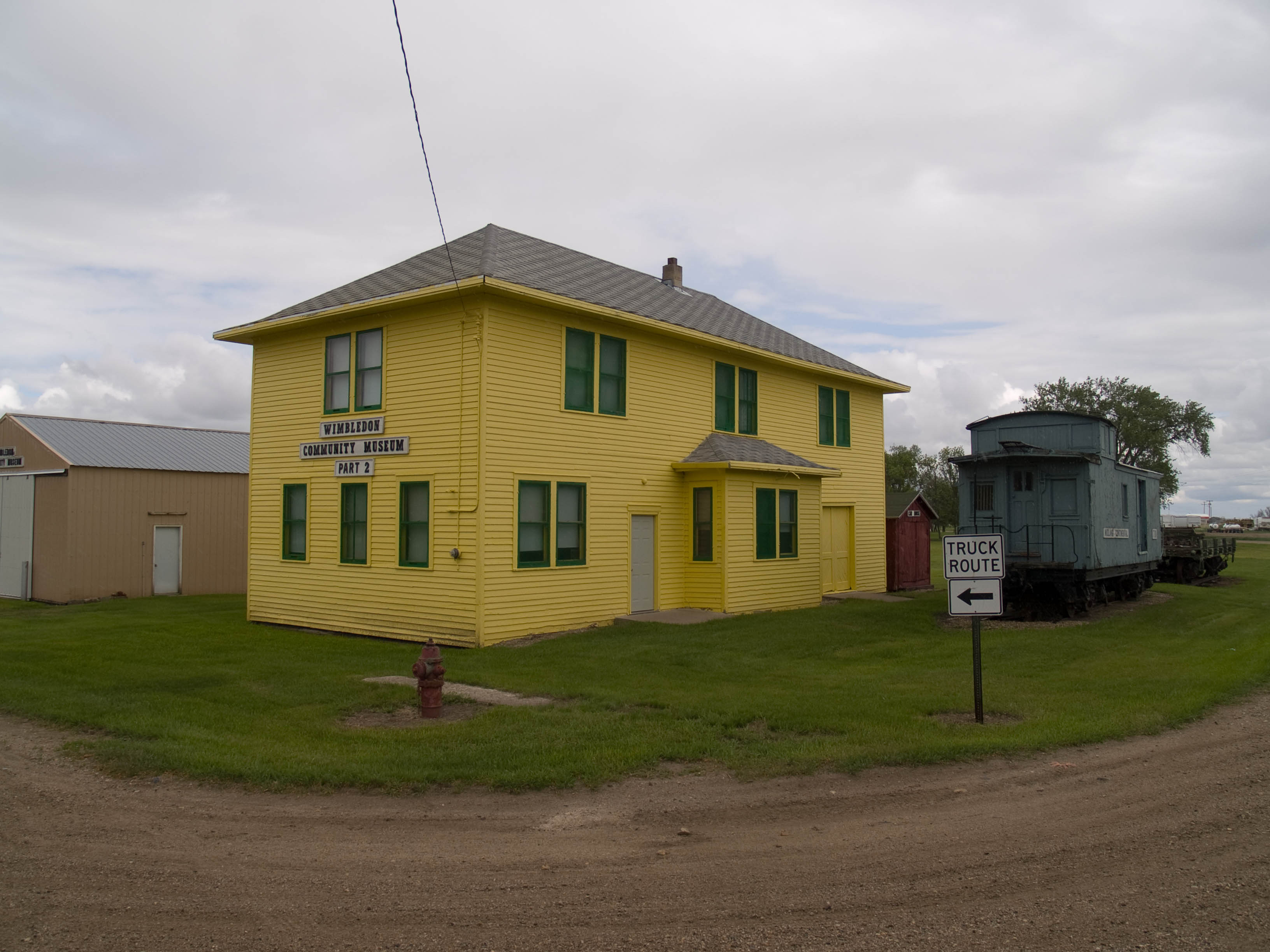
- Midland Continental Railroad Depot in Wimbledon, North Dakota

Overview
- Reporting mark: MICO
- Locale: North Dakota, United States
- Dates of operation: 1906–1966
- Successor: Northern Pacific & Soo Line

Technical
- Track gauge: 4 ft 8 1/2 in (1,435 mm) standard gauge
- Length: 77 miles (124 km)

The Midland Continental Railroad (reporting mark MICO) is a defunct shortline railroad which operated in the U.S. state of North Dakota between 1906 and 1966. The railroad was envisioned as a trunk line running from Winnipeg, Manitoba, Canada to Galveston, Texas. Financing problems led to the completion of only two segments totalling 77 miles (124 km).

== History ==
=== Proposal ===
The vision of creating a mid-continent north-south railroad line between Canada and the Gulf of Mexico was first promulgated by Herbert Sydney Duncombe, a Chicago lawyer, and Frank K. Bull, president of the J.I. Case Threshing Machine Company of Racine, Wisconsin. In March 1906 they organized a group of investors to incorporate a company under the laws of South Dakota, and with it also incorporated the Midland Construction Company to construct the railroad. The distance traversed by the proposed trunk line was 1 800 miles (2900 km), although the actual track length was estimated at 2 500 miles (4 000 km).

Authorised share capital was $70 000 000. The construction company entered into an agreement with the MICO to build the line in exchange for securities, at the rate of $75 000 per mile. A third of these were to be common stock, a third preferred stock, and a third in corporate bonds. Hence, the construction company's directors bore the burden of finding monies for construction.

Surveying on the first phase of the project was in 1907, from Pembina, North Dakota to Wheeler, South Dakota. The latter was the county seat of Charles Mix County before it was flooded when the Missouri River was dammed to form Lake Francis Case. The following segment, south from Wheeler, would require a major bridge over the river -but no action was ever taken on this.

In 1908, a survey was done from Pembina to Winnipeg, although a Canadian subsidiary was not established, and the immediate intention was to connect with the Canadian Northern Railway at Pembina and acquire trackage rights to Winnipeg.

=== First phase ===
After detailed surveying was completed, construction commenced in North Dakota on 12 August 1909. The first segment ran from Edgeley to Jamestown. This was an extension of a line of the Chicago, Milwaukee, St. Paul and Pacific Railroad (reporting mark MILW) running from Aberdeen, South Dakota and terminating at Edgeley.

The company had not attracted any substantial investment, hence lacked the funds for this short length of line -32.7 miles (52.6 km). Certain of its investors set up the Midland Townsite Company in October 1909 to speculate in land at four future railroad town sites on the route: Franklin, Nortonville, Sydney and Millarton. Even so, money was so tight that the line was only finished on 1 November 1912 and had taken over three years to build.

=== Second phase ===
Because of the financial difficulties, a new Midland Continental Railroad Company was established in August 1910 under the laws of North Dakota, and the original company of that name had its name changed to Midland Continental Railroad Company of South Dakota. The latter transferred the unfinished line to the former in October 1910. The new MICO was chartered to build from Pembina to Forbes on the South Dakota border, and the MICO(SD) was to take it on from there to St. Lawrence, South Dakota where interchange would have been made with the Chicago and North Western Railroad (reporting mark CNW). This latter section appeared in publicity material, but otherwise vanished into oblivion.

Frank Seiberling, president of the Goodyear Tire Company became involved in the project in 1912, when he advanced $400,000 cash in exchange for a mortgage on the construction company. This injection of funds allowed the beginning of the second phase, running north-east of Jamestown.

The new line had to cross the transcontinental trunk line of the Northern Pacific Railway (reporting mark NP) in that town. This was too dangerous to do at grade, and the MICO couldn't afford the bridgework or approach fills. It was forced to build around the east side of the city from a wye south of the terminal station, leaving the latter on a stub, crossing the NP main line where the latter was on a fill which could be easily bored through to create a narrow bridge. The end of this new extension was Wimbledon where a connection was made with the Minneapolis, St. Paul and Sault Ste. Marie Railroad (reporting mark SOO). The actual terminus in Wimbledon was to be just beyond downtown to the north-east.

Durkee, Johnson, Clementsville and Durupt were platted as towns on this route, in the same way as those of the Edgeley line, except that the associated company here was the Dakota Land and Mortgage Company.

The original plan was that the trunk line would run from downtown Jamestown to Courtenay which is the next city on the Soo Line north-west of Wimbledon. Hence, this new extension was not on the planned route. It was finished in October 1913, apart from a very short extension of 0.3 miles (0.5 km) to a location called Frazier north of the Wimbledon station to serve a grain elevator. This was opened in December. The Wimbledon passenger station was east of downtown, on 17th Street SE.

Frazier was the site of an abortive town project sponsored by the North Dakota Nonpartisan League, and was named after a prominent member Lynn Frazier (later state governor).

=== End of the dream ===
After completing the two segments from Edgeley to Jamestown to Wimbledon, funds ran out and additional investors were solicited. Finding no new investors in the United States, Frank K. Bull the original promoter headed to Britain in 1914. He found that J. Bruce Ismay, former chairman of the White Star Line and Titanic survivor, was interested in buying all of a new bond issue to finance further extension. This issue comprised $6 000 000 gold bonds at 5%, authorised in 1910. Before the deal could be signed, WWI started in Europe and Ismay withdrew his offer. The bond issue was cancelled.

In 1916, the MICO managed a short half-mile extension from its junction with the NP east of Jamestown, to a new downtown terminus nearer to the NP's main line station. A roundhouse, passenger station and freight depot were built there, and were ready by 1917. The company headquarters were established here. Also, the railroad laid a spur to the North Dakota State Hospital.

Maps of the period show that the company intended to extend from Wimbledon due north to Sutton on the Great Northern Railway (reporting mark GN) instead of in the direction of Cooperstown as previously intended.

In 1916, the Midland Construction Company defaulted on its bonds. Seiberling filed a foreclosure suit, and took over control of the MICO to safeguard his investment. The construction company was wound up, resulting in the end of the dream of a trunk line. Seiberling announced originally that he wished to extend the line to Grand Forks instead. Meanwhile, in early 1917 he ordered improvement to depot and station facilities, especially to the road access for some of them. Although mule carts could cope with dirt tracks in wet weather, the newly developing motor vehicles could not.

However, the US entered WWI in 1917. From then until 1920 the railroad was under government control. All thoughts of extension were abandoned after that.

In 1920, immediately on getting its railroad back, the company moved its Wimbledon passenger station downtown from its former location on the city's eastern outskirts. A site was chosen on the corner of Railway Street and 4th Avenue, opposite the Soo main line station, and a short spur built to it from the western junction curve to the Soo Line. The station building was moved to its new location. This was the last construction that the railroad achieved.

=== Short line ===
The railroad's subsequent history was primarily as a short line serving local agriculture and its service industries. Its major claim to fame was that the singer Peggy Lee, who was born in 1920, had a father who was an employee of the MICO from 1916 to 1944. He was in charge at Nortonville station when it burned down in 1930, and of Wimbledon station from 1934 to 1937 where she was resident as a teenager -and helped out with station duties when he was too drunk to cope.

Despite its minor status, under the presidency of Seiberling the railroad made strenuous efforts to promote itself also as a bridge line between the three major railroads with which it connected -the Soo Line, Northern Pacific and Milwaukee Road. To this end, it advertised itself as The Mid-Land Route.

In 1937, the railroad received permission to discontinue timetable freight and passenger services from Jamestown to Wimbledon and to operate on call and demand, meaning that carload freight customers would contact MICO Control at Jamestown to arrange pickup and delivery. Passenger service continued, but on an irregular basis and would have involved a so-called mixed train consisting of a passenger car attached to a string of freight cars. The former would have been used for LCL (less than-car-load) freight items as well. The same arrangement was allowed for Jamestown to Edgeley in 1950. The last passenger was recorded as travelling in 1965.

The company continued to be owned privately by the Seiberling family until it was purchased jointly in 1966 by the Northern Pacific and Soo Line railroads.

=== Closure ===
Closure mostly occurred in 1969, after serious flood damage that spring. Formal abandonment took place on 31 October 1970.

A stub from Jamestown south to Kloze remained until 1976, and formally abandoned in 1979. Also the Soo Line took on a stub at Wimbledon, from Frazier to Clementsville, and this survived until 1982.

=== Remains ===
Only two portions of the system survived to date (2020). One was the spur to the North Dakota State Hospital, which was operated by the BNSF Railway until taken on by the Red River Valley and Western Railroad. This includes the original interchange junction wye at Jamestown, together with a short stub track running in the direction of the original terminus and terminating at 12th Avenue SE north of 7th Street SE.

The RRVW railroad also took over the former Milwaukee Road depot at Edgeley, along with a short length of MICO track from the junction curve with the former Northern Pacific line to Streeter. Tracks were still in place at both locations in 2020, the latter being the freight terminal for Edgeley.

The surviving former station building in Wimbledon, at 401 Railway Street, is now the Midland Continental Depot Transportation Museum opened in 2012.

== Proposed routes ==
=== North Dakota trunk line ===
The trunk line route as originally proposed ran from Winnipeg to Pembina, then through North Dakota to Forbes. Pembina to Forbes was the only section of the entire project, the construction of which was actively undertaken.

The route was, with intended railroad connections: Pembina, Carlisle, Hamilton GN, Crystal GN, Park River GN, Fordville SOO, Niagara GN, Moraine, Aneta GN, Cooperstown NP, Helena GN (the GN called its station here Revere), Courtenay NP (not Wimbledon), Jamestown SOO, Edgeley NP MILW, Merricourt SOO (a ghost town) and Forbes GN.

=== South Dakota trunk line ===
The route was surveyed ready for construction from Forbes to St Lawrence, and outline surveyed to Wheeler (on the Missouri River, now drowned). Connections were to have been Leola Minneapolis and St. Louis Railway (reporting mark MSTL), Craven MILW, Cresbard MSTL, Rockham CNW and St Lawrence CNW.

=== Southwards ===
The trunk line south of Wheeler was not surveyed. The 1913 publicity map shows the line avoiding most major cities. In Nebraska, it would have passed Grand Island and Hastings to t he east; in Kansas, Wichita to the west and in Oklahoma, Guthrie and Oklahoma City to the east. It intended to penetrate Fort Worth, Texas. South of there, there would have been a major junction at Cleburne with the Galveston branch bypassing Houston to the west and the Corpus Christi branch bypassing Austin to the east.

=== Wimbledon to Sutton ===
After the Wimbledon line had been finished in 1913, the initial intention was to extend from Wimbledon due north to Sutton on the Great Northern Railway. The GN was the fourth major railroad operating in North Dakota, and in the event the MICO never connected with it.

=== Grand Forks proposal ===
The Norton proposal was quickly dropped in favor of an extension to Grand Forks. This was promoted by Seiberling when he took over. An outline survey of this route had been made in 1910. The stations would have been Revere GN, Skaar (not to be confused with the place in McKenzie County), Cooperstown NP (these had been on the original trunk line route), Romness, Sharon GN, Goose River, Northwood GN, McRae and Brenna.

== Actual route ==
=== Edgeley city ===
The route as built started in Edgeley at an end-on interchange with the Chicago, Milwaukee, St. Paul and Pacific Railroad. The two companies shared some facilities, and the MICO used the MILW passenger station.

Formerly, the Northern Pacific line from LaMoure to Streeter bypassed Edgeley to the north. So, the NP had a short stub line running from a wye to terminate on the western city limits at 6th Avenue. Also there was an interchange curve east to south from this, where the MICO crossed just outside the northern city limits, north of 72nd Street SE. The NP terminal was abandoned by the Red River Valley and Western Railroad, which established its freight terminal for the city at the old MILW site. Hence, the MICO connecting curve and a very short stretch of line survive here in use.

=== Edgeley to Jamestown ===
From Edgeley, passenger stops were at Winal, Franklin, Nortonville, Millarton, Sydney, Kloze, Homer and State Hospital.

Winal was just south of where the MICO crossed the NP line to Streeter, on 71st Street SE, and does not exist as a place any more (the location is just west of a mobile phone mast). The next four stops were actually platted as towns by a development company associated with the MICO when the line was built. Franklin has ceased to exist, there is not a trace of it on 65th Street SE -it used to be in Glenmore township, and was named after Franklin, Michigan, because the first folk who settled came from there. Nortonville is notable (see below). Millarton is tiny, but has kept its identity and has a disused grain elevator adjacent to the station site on Millarton Street between 81st and 82nd Avenues SE and 51st and 52nd Streets SE. Sydney is a single farm on 47th Street SE, with traces of ruins adjacent to the station site.

Kloze was the freight terminus of a surviving portion of line from Jamestown until 1976, after the rest of the route had been abandoned in 1969. Kloze is a tiny hamlet. Unusually, it is accessed by a diagonal road which parallels the railroad grade, instead of conforming to the land survey grid as most North Dakota country roads do. It runs between 81st Avenue SE and 42nd Street SE. Homer is also tiny, but the station site survives next to the crossroads of 39th Street SE and 85th Avenue SE.

=== Nortonville, North Dakota ===
The MICO platted eight railroad towns, through subsidiary land development companies. All but one have lost any civic identity that they ever might have had and are ghosts, with the exception of Nortonville. This is on 59th Street SE, just west of 80th Avenue SE, and has kept part of its grid layout -3rd to 6th Avenues, and 2nd and 3rd Streets (59th Street doubles up as 1st Street here). There is a Roman Catholic church, and two old grain elevators as well as some other old buildings. The railroad station was where a timber merchant is today, adjacent to the south elevator. It burned down in 1930, which is remembered because the family of the singer Peggy Lee was in residence at the time.

=== Jamestown city ===
The line to Wimbledon started with a triangular wye, Jamestown Junction, just north of Homer -the wye is crossed by 38th Street SE. To the north of this, State Hospital station was on 37th Street SE. From here, the hospital spur had a junction facing Edgeley and ran to the hospital complex. The line from here to the former NP junction and the spur are still in use and the track is in place, with enough track to the south of the station site to allow for switching.

The original route continued to Jamestown, where the line maintained an interchange with the Northern Pacific Railway. The junction spur, south to north, begins at 11th Street SE and forms a triangular wye with the NP line from Jamestown to LaMoure. The original 1912 terminus was at the spur junction, about the end of 10th Street SE. The junction wye still has track (2020). From there, the 1916 extension paralleled the NP line for the short distance to the terminal station, depot and roundhouse at the east end of 2nd Street SE.

An original MICO wooden bridge spans 17th Street SE, just north of the interstate highway junction.

=== Jamestown to Wimbledon ===
The Wimbledon line ran east of Jamestown Junction and crossed the NP line to LaMoure before heading slightly east of north. Passenger stops were Durkee, Hurning, Johnson, Clementsville, Durupt, Wimbledon and Frazier.

Durkee, Johnson, Clementsville and Durupt were platted as towns in the same way as those of the Edgeley line, except that the associated company here was the Dakota Land and Mortgage Company. This was a very late example of the foundation of railroad towns, and all four have become ghost towns.

Durkee is on 37th Street SE, and is a field with a farm to the east. The station site, railroad grade and townsite have all been plowed out. North of this the line was crossed by the Interstate 94 highway on an overcrossing. Then came the crossing of the NP intercontinental trunk line, done by boring through the fill of the trunk line at this point and creating a very narrow bridge now over a private road. This bridge was immediately followed by Hurning on 33rd Street SE. Not a single building is there, but the road crosses the line via a bridge built in 1936 which is now listed on the National Register of Historic Places as the Midland Continental Overpass. Johnson is a single farmstead on a crossroads on 30th Street SE. Clementsville is a grain elevator on 26th Street SE accompanied by a small farmstead, and tracks were in place here until 1982 being operated by the Soo Line. Durupt is another crossroads, on 22 Street SE, but there is nothing there again and the site is under the plow.

=== Wimbledon city ===
The MICO terminated in Wimbledon where it interchanged with the Minneapolis, St. Paul and Sault Ste. Marie Railroad (Soo Line).

After crossing the Soo trunk line, the MICO had two reverse junction spurs running back to connect with it east and west. The west curve had a wye at its junction with the MICO line, allowing trains from Jamestown to run directly to Wimbledon downtown. Just before the junction of this curve with the Soo, a short stub ran to the Wimbledon terminal station which was erected at 401 Railway Street in 1920.

The MICO main line ran on the east side of the city to the grain elevator at Frazier, on 16 1/2 Avenue SE. Before 1920 the station was on it, on the north side 7th Street SE east of 7th Avenue, and the former grade crossing here still had a "Railroad Crossing" sign in 2013 (removed by 2020).

== Equipment ==
In 1927, the railroad had two steam locomotives, seventeen freight cars, two passenger cars and two work cars.

The track comprised 65 pound (29 kg) rails on softwood ties. Owing to the flatness of the terrain, there were no notable engineering works and no substantial underbridges.

== Operations ==
=== Passengers ===
The railroad was operated as two passenger routes, Jamestown to Edgeley and to Frazier via Wimbledon. Despite Wimbledon station being a terminus, passenger trains still began and ended at Frazier entailing a reversal in and out of Wimbledon.

In February 1926, for example, each had one train each way:

Edgeley from Jamestown left at 11:30, and arrived at 13:53 having taken 2 hours 23 minutes to travel 33.7 miles (54 km). It returned at 14:15, arriving back at 16:35.

Frazier from Jamestown left at 6:00 and arrived at 8:02, taking two minutes over two hours to travel 31.5 miles (51 km). It returned at 8:27, and arrived at 10:25.

The company did not envision its passengers going to town on day trips, allowing only 20 minutes or so before the return. Rather, the traffic flow would have been dominated by travel onwards. The company's publicity highlighted the NP's trunk line at Jamestown, that of the Soo Line at Wimbledon, and the Milwaukee Road's line at Edgeley which fed to its own transcontinental line at Aberdeen, South Dakota.

Only at Edgeley could passengers transfer within the station. At Wimbledon, the MICO and NP stations were adjacent -before 1920 they were half a mile (0.8 km) apart- and at Jamestown they were a quarter of a mile (0.4 km) apart.

=== Freight ===
==== Sourced ====
Sourced freight involved farm produce out, and requisites for farms in. This included fuel, an item also still regularly delivered to the State Hospital. Farming here was dominated by wheat in the company's lifetime. Apart from agricultural support firms, there was little industry to be serviced.

Near the beginning of WWII, the grain elevators at Frasier were shipping 70% of the grain carried by the railroad. After the war until abandonment, Wimbledon station was processing freight shipments which accounted for over half the railroad's revenue.

==== Terminal ====
The MICO operated as a terminal railroad for the Milwaukee Road from Edgeley, allowing that company to solicit freight in Jamestown and Wimbledon. This company had a poor penetration of North Dakota otherwise. The Northern Pacific similarly targeted Wimbledon, and the Soo Line Jamestown and Edgeley.

==== Bridge line ====
The company made strenuous efforts in the 1920s to establish itself as a bridge route between the Soo Line and the Milwaukee Road. The most useful of the two transcontinental routes that it advertised was from the Canadian Pacific trunk line from Vancouver to Calgary, then via the Soo Line and the MICO to the Milwaukee Road at Edgeley and hence to Des Moines, Iowa and St Louis via the Wabash Railroad. The other route was from the Milwaukee Road's Pacific Extension via Aberdeen and Edgeley, then eastwards on the Soo Line from Wimbledon. Major eastern destinations on this latter route would involve the Milwaukee Road short-hauling itself. For the same reason, the Northern Pacific was not interested.

The Soo Line valued the MICO as an intra-system bridge route, connecting its trunk line at Wimbledon with its loop line through Wishek and Bismarck. It showed this connection on its publicity maps in the 1950s, e.g. in 1952, indicating that the MICO then had a trackage arrangement with the Milwaukee Road from Edgeley to Monango.

== See also ==
- Midland Continental Railroad Depot
- Midland Continental Overpass
- Midland Continental Depot Transportation Museum - official site
- National Register of Historic Places, Wimbledon Depot
