= Keystone =

Keystone or key-stone may refer to:

- Keystone (architecture), a central stone or other piece at the apex of an arch or vault
- Keystone (cask), a fitting used in ale casks

== Companies ==
- Keystone Law, a full-service law firm
- Digital Keystone, a developer of digital entertainment software
- Keystone Aircraft Corporation
- Keystone Bridge Company, an American bridge building company
- Keystone (beer brand)
- Keystone Camera Company
- Keystone (gasoline automobile)
- Keystone (steam automobile)
- Keystone Pipeline, a crude oil pipeline
- Keystone-SDA/Keystone-ATS, a Swiss press agency
- Keystone View Company, a US photo agency
- Keystone (Berkeley, California), a defunct music club

== Education ==
- Keystone Academy, a private K–12 school in Shunyi, Beijing, China
- Keystone College, a private college in Pennsylvania, United States
- Keystone Exam, a standardized test at public schools in Pennsylvania, United States
- Keystone School, a private K–12 school in San Antonio, Texas, United States
- Keystone School Online, a private for-profit online K–12 school based in Herndon, Virginia, United States
- Keystone, an education program at the U.S. National Defense University

== Entertainment ==
- Keystone (video game), part of the Xbox Live Arcade title Fable 2 Pub Games
- Keystone (band), led by jazz trumpeter Dave Douglas
  - Keystone (album), a 2005 album by the band
- Keystone Cops, a silent movie series
- Keystone Kapers, a classic Atari game
- Keystone Studios, a movie studio

== Places ==
- The Keystone asterism in the constellation Hercules

=== United States ===
- The "Keystone State", nickname for the U.S. Commonwealth of Pennsylvania
- Keystone, Colorado, a town
  - Keystone Resort, the related ski resort
- Keystone, Florida, an unincorporated community
- Keystone, Indiana
- Keystone, Iowa
- Keystone, Missouri
- Keystone, Nebraska
- Keystone, North Dakota
- Keystone, Ohio
- Keystone, South Dakota, a town near Mount Rushmore
- Keystone, Washington, an unincorporated community
- Keystone, West Virginia
- Keystone, Wyoming
- Keystone at the Crossing, a business/shopping district in Indianapolis, Indiana
  - The Fashion Mall at Keystone, located in the Keystone shopping district
- Keystone Heights, Florida
- Keystone Canyon, Alaska
- Keystone Lake, a resort area near Tulsa, Oklahoma
- Keystone, Wisconsin

=== Canada ===
- The "Keystone Province", a nickname for the Province of Manitoba
  - Keystone Centre, an arena and exhibition centre in Brandon, Manitoba

=== Fictional locations ===
- Keystone City, home of the comic book character The Flash
- Keystone City, a holographic city in the Star Trek: The Next Generation episode "Emergence"

== Railroads ==
- Keystone Corridor, a rail corridor from Philadelphia to Pittsburgh
- Keystone Service, a current New York-Harrisburg service
  - Keystone (Amtrak train, 1979–1981), a predecessor of the current service
- Keystone (Amtrak train, 1971–1972), a former New York-Pittsburgh service operated by Amtrak
- Keystone, a former New York-Washington service operated by the Pennsylvania Railroad
  - Keystone (train), a lightweight train used for the service

== Sports ==
- Keystone Junior Hockey League, in Manitoba
- Keystone Cup, Western Canadian Junior "B" ice hockey championship
- Keystone (horse), a racehorse

== Other uses ==
- Keystone (limestone), quarried in the Florida Keys
- Keystone effect, caused by projecting an image onto a surface at an angle, or by photography at an angle
- Keystone Initiative, a medical protocol to reduce infection rates
- Keystone module, a type of data connector mounted in walls and patch panels
- Keystone Press Awards
- Keystone species, species that have a larger effect on their environment than is purely due to their abundance
- Operation Keystone, during World War II
- Keystone, a variety of screwdriver blade
- "Keystone", a descriptive reference to the Book of Mormon
- The Keystone, journal of the Pennsylvania Railroad Technical and Historical Society
- The Keystone, Pennsylvania news website owned by Courier Newsroom

== See also ==
- Stone (disambiguation)
- Key (disambiguation)
- The Stone Key (2008 novel) post-apocalyptic novel by Isobelle Carmody
