= Bone Hill =

Bone Hill may refer to one of the following places in the United States:

- Bone Hill (Missouri), a hill in Jackson County, Missouri
- Bone Hill National Wildlife Refuge, a protected area in North Dakota

== See also ==
- Bonehill (surname)
