= Glover, North Dakota =

Unincorporated community in North Dakota, US

Glover
- Unincorporated community
- Location within the state of North Dakota Glover (the United States)
- Coordinates: 46°14′30″N 98°08′20″W
- Country: United States
- State: North Dakota
- County: Dickey
- Elevation: 1,375 ft (419 m)
- Time zone: UTC-6 (Central (CST))
  - Summer (DST): UTC-5 (CDT)
- Area code: 701
- GNIS feature ID: 1029143

Glover is a small community in Dickey County, North Dakota, United States, located north and west of Oakes. Its elevation is 1,375 feet (419 m).

== Geography ==
Glover is 40 miles (64 km) from Ellendale, the county seat.

== History ==
Glover was originally a rail station on the Chicago and Northwestern Railway in 1886. The Glover post office was established on January 26, 1887, and the community was named after Samuel Glover, who moved to the area from Delaware, Ohio, purchasing a large amount of land in the Glover area.

According to one source, the population of Glover has always been under 100. The population was 80 in 1940. The Glover post office closed in 1943.

== See also ==
- Keystone, North Dakota
