= Yorktown Township =

Yorktown Township may refer to:

- Yorktown Township, Henry County, Illinois
- Yorktown Township, Dickey County, North Dakota
