= Dickey, North Dakota =

- City
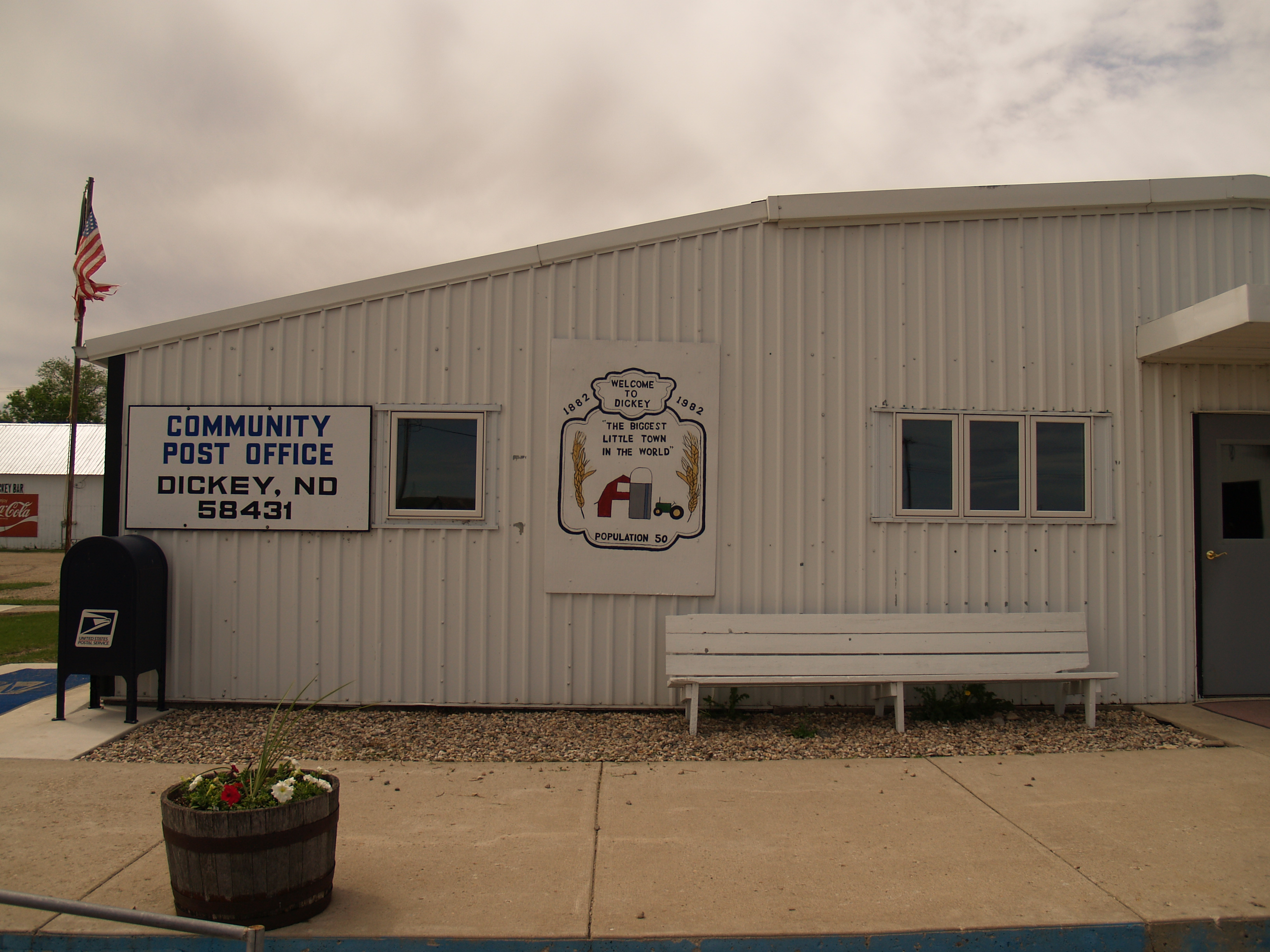
- Post office in Dickey (June 2008)
- Interactive map of Dickey, North Dakota
- Location within North Dakota
- Coordinates: 46.5368°N 98.4681°W
- Country: United States
- State: North Dakota
- County: LaMoure
- Founded: 1885
- Named for: George H. Dickey

Area
  - Total: 0.239 sq mi (0.620 km^{2})
  - Land: 0.239 sq mi (0.620 km^{2})
  - Water: 0 sq mi (0.000 km^{2}) 0.00%
- Elevation: 1,355 ft (413 m)

Population (2020)
  - Total: 42
  - Estimate (2025): 50
  - Density: 180/sq mi (68/km^{2})
- Time zone: UTC–6 (Central (CST))
  - Summer (DST): UTC–5 (CDT)
- ZIP Code: 58431
- Area code: 701
- FIPS code: 38-19580
- GNIS feature ID: 1035990

Dickey is a city in LaMoure County, North Dakota, United States. The population was 42 as of the 2020 census, and was estimated at 50 in 2025.

== History ==
Dickey was founded in 1885. George H. Dickey is the town's namesake.

== Geography ==
According to the United States Census Bureau, the city has a total area of 0.239 square miles (0.62 km^{2}), all land.

== Demographics ==
Historical population
Census	Pop.	Note	%±
1910	187		—
1920	190		1.6%
1930	168		−11.6%
1940	203		20.8%
1950	165		−18.7%
1960	143		−13.3%
1970	118		−17.5%
1980	74		−37.3%
1990	53		−28.4%
2000	57		7.5%
2010	42		−26.3%
2020	42		0.0%
2025 (est.)	50		19.0%
U.S. Decennial Census; 2020 Census

=== 2020 census ===
As of the 2020 census, there were 42 people, 16 households, and 12 families residing in the city.

=== 2010 census ===
As of the 2010 census, there were 42 people, 20 households, and 10 families residing in the city. The population density was 190.9 inhabitants per square mile (73.7/km^{2}). There were 31 housing units at an average density of 140.9 per square mile (54.4/km^{2}). The racial makeup of the city was 100.0% White.

There were 20 households, of which 10.0% had children under the age of 18 living with them, 35.0% were married couples living together, 10.0% had a female householder with no husband present, 5.0% had a male householder with no wife present, and 50.0% were non-families. 40.0% of all households were made up of individuals, and 5% had someone living alone who was 65 years of age or older. The average household size was 2.10 and the average family size was 2.80.

The median age in the city was 39 years. 21.4% of residents were under the age of 18; 0.0% were between the ages of 18 and 24; 30.9% were from 25 to 44; 28.4% were from 45 to 64; and 19% were 65 years of age or older. The gender makeup of the city was 54.8% male and 45.2% female.

=== 2000 census ===
As of the 2000 census, there were 57 people, 26 households, and 12 families residing in the city. The population density was 260.8 inhabitants per square mile (100.7/km^{2}). There were 31 housing units at an average density of 141.8 per square mile (54.7/km^{2}). The racial makeup of the city was 100.00% White.

There were 26 households, out of which 26.9% had children under the age of 18 living with them, 38.5% were married couples living together, 3.8% had a female householder with no husband present, and 53.8% were non-families. 53.8% of all households were made up of individuals, and 30.8% had someone living alone who was 65 years of age or older. The average household size was 2.19 and the average family size was 3.50.

In the city, the population was spread out, with 17.5% under the age of 18, 14.0% from 18 to 24, 21.1% from 25 to 44, 29.8% from 45 to 64, and 17.5% who were 65 years of age or older. The median age was 43 years. For every 100 females, there were 119.2 males. For every 100 females age 18 and over, there were 104.3 males.

The median income for a household in the city was $18,500, and the median income for a family was $23,750. Males had a median income of $28,333 versus $11,250 for females. The per capita income for the city was $10,547. There were 50.0% of families and 39.0% of the population living below the poverty line, including 16.7% of under eighteens and none of those over 64.
