= Ada Township, North Dakota =

Township in North Dakota, US

- Township
- Location within the state of North Dakota
- Coordinates: 45°59′13″N 98°18′50″W
- Country: United States
- State: North Dakota
- County: Dickey

Area
  - Total: 36.0 sq mi (93.2 km^{2})
  - Land: 36.0 sq mi (93.2 km^{2})
  - Water: 0 sq mi (0.0 km^{2})
- Elevation: 1,375 ft (419 m)

Population (2020)
  - Total: 29
  - Density: 0.78/sq mi (0.3/km^{2})
- Time zone: UTC-6 (Central (CST))
  - Summer (DST): UTC-5 (CDT)
- Area code: 701
- FIPS code: 38-00300
- GNIS feature ID: 1036744

Ada is a township in Dickey County, North Dakota, United States. Its population during the 2020 Census was 29, down from 60 in 2000. Its population in 1900 was 232.

== History ==
Ada Township was first settled in the early 1880s. Originally part of Weston Township, which at the time covered two survey townships in Townships 129 and 130N, Range 61W. Ada was organized around 1900 from the southern of the two townships and the northern one was renamed Kent Township.

The village of Silverleaf, built in 1887, is located 7 miles east of Ellendale, and was once the major population center in the township. The town reported around 25 residents in the late 1910s, and never seemed to exceed more than 50. It is little more than a ghost town today.

The village served a flag station for the Great Northern Railroad. Two conflicting stories exist over the origin of the name. Some say it is for the silverberry bushes found in the area, but others attribute the naming to a joke played by an early settler, Dan Keenan. Keenan reportedly removed the label from a tin of "Silverleaf" lard and nailed it to a boxcar parked at the station.

== Notable person ==
John E. Skogland (1879 – 1940) was a member of the North Dakota House of Representatives from 1925 to 1926.
