= Kulm Wetland Management District =

Wetland management district in North Dakota

- IUCN category IV (habitat/species management area)
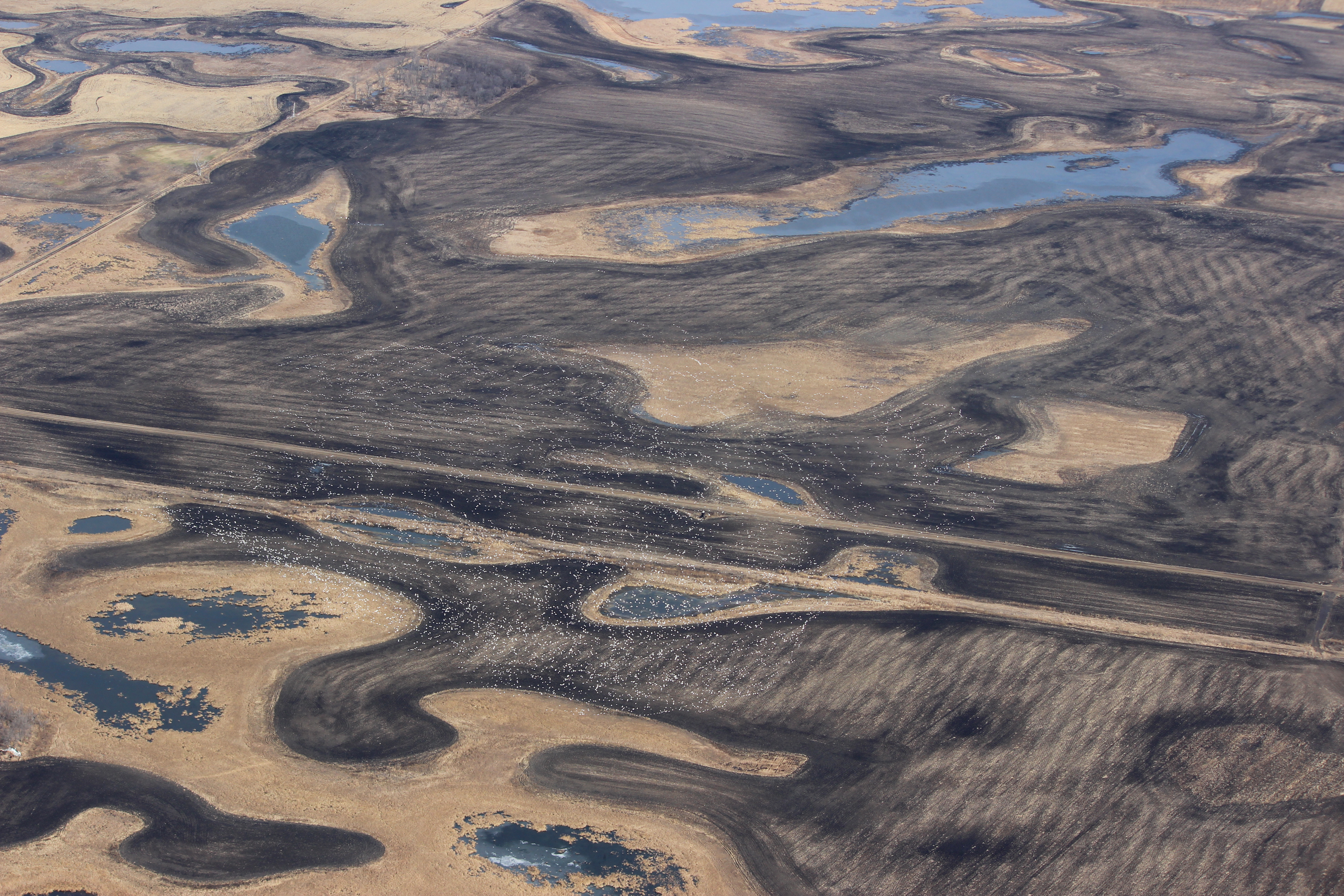
- Aerial view of snow geese flying over potholes in the Kulm Wetland Management District
- Interactive map of Kulm Wetland Management District
- Location: Dickey, LaMoure, Logan and McIntosh County, North Dakota, United States
- Nearest city: Kulm, North Dakota
- Coordinates: 46°18′N 98°56′W
- Area: 45,683 acres (18,487 ha)
- Established: July 1971
- Governing body: U.S. Fish and Wildlife Service
- Website: www.fws.gov/refuge/kulm-wetland-management-district

Located in south-central North Dakota, Kulm Wetland Management District was established in July 1971. Located in the Prairie Pothole Region of North America, Kulm Wetland Management District provides breeding, nesting, and brood rearing areas for many species of waterfowl and other migratory birds. The District currently manages 201 waterfowl production areas that total 45,683 acres (184.87 km^{2}), 3 national wildlife refuges that are easement refuges (Bone Hill NWR, Dakota Lake NWR, Maple River NWR), and 120,000 acres (490 km^{2}) of wetland and grassland easements. The District's headquarters is in Kulm, North Dakota.

In many parts of Kulm Wetland Management District, the abundance of wetlands attracts waterfowl breeding pair densities of over 100 pairs per square mile. Native prairie is still well represented in the area and is home to many species of upland nesting birds. The James River meanders through the eastern portion of the District. As it leads south to the Missouri River, the James River forms a major migration corridor for numerous migrating birds.
