= Alberth =

Alberth may refer to:

- Alberth Bravo (born 1987), Venezuelan sprinter
- Alberth Elis (born 1996), Honduran footballer
- Alberth Papilaya (1967–2021), Indonesian boxer
- Alberth Villalobos (born 1995), Costa Rican footballer
- Rudolf Alberth (1918–1992), German conductor and composer

== See also ==
- Albert (disambiguation)
- Albertha, a town in North Dakota
