= Maple River National Wildlife Refuge =

Coordinates: 46°03′50″N 98°24′22″W

Maple River National Wildlife Refuge is a National Wildlife Refuge in North Dakota. It is managed under Kulm Wetland Management District.

Maple River National Wildlife Refuge was established by Executive Order 8162, signed on June 12, 1939 by President Franklin D. Roosevelt. The Refuge boundaries encompass 1,120 acres (4.5 km^{2}) of private land. A system of management easements allows the District flood land within the river channel and to restrict hunting, trapping and other harassment of wildlife.

The District manages two dams on Maple River National Wildlife Refuge. A low level dam on the Maple River raises the level of Maple River and floods an adjacent 90-acre (360,000 m^{2}) marsh area. A dam on Maple River marsh holds water in the marsh as flow in Maple River drops following spring run-off. Both the river channel and the marsh provide breeding, nesting and brood rearing habitat for many marsh dependent birds and other wildlife. Maple River is near enough to the James River to be part of the migration corridor for many species of birds.

Maple River National Wildlife Refuge is located in central Dickey County, North Dakota. From Ellendale the Refuge is located 4 ½ miles east on North Dakota Highway 11, then 5 miles (8.0 km) north and 1-mile (1.6 km) east on county and township roads.

A 414-acre (1.68 km^{2}) portion of Maple River National Wildlife Refuge was purchased by the Service in the early 1960s with funds from the Small Wetland Acquisition Program. Lands purchased with Duck Stamp funds are delineated with Waterfowl Production Area (WPA) signs instead of the familiar blue goose Refuge sign.

Refuge portions of Maple River National Wildlife Refuge are closed to all public use. Portions of the Refuge owned by the Service and marked with WPA signs are open to public use. Hunting, wildlife observation and photography are available to the public on the WPA part of the Refuge.
