= Henry Briscoe =

English cricketer

Personal information
- Full name: Henry Briscoe
- Born: 20 May 1861; Bonehill, Staffordshire, England
- Died: 7 March 1911 (aged 49); Fenton, Staffordshire, England
- Batting: Right-handed
- Bowling: Right-arm fast-medium

Domestic team information
- Years: Team
- 1895–1896: Staffordshire
- 1888: England XI

Career statistics
Competition	First-class
Matches	1
Runs scored	4
Batting average	4.00
100s/50s	–/–
Top score	4*
Balls bowled	96
Wickets	–
Bowling average	–
5 wickets in innings	–
10 wickets in match	–
Best bowling	–
Catches/stumpings	–/–
- Source: Cricinfo, 8 July 2011

Henry Briscoe (20 May 1861 – 7 March 1911) was an English cricketer. Briscoe was a right-handed batsman who bowled right-arm fast-medium. He was born in Bonehill, Staffordshire.

Briscoe made his only first-class appearance for an England XI against the touring Australians at the County Ground, Stoke-on-Trent in 1888. In this match, he bowled 24 wicket-less overs in the Australian's first innings. With the bat, he was dismissed for a duck by Charles Turner in the England XI's first innings, one of 6 ducks in the England innings which ended with the England XI 28 all out. Following on, the England XI fared little, this time being dismissed for 79 runs to hand the Australians an innings and 135 run victory, with Briscoe ending the second-innings unbeaten on 4.

Having played for Staffordshire for several years, Briscoe played for the county in the Minor Counties Championship from 1895 to 1896, making 4 appearances.
