= Operation Archway =

SAS operation during WW2

- Part of the Western Allied invasion of Germany in the Western Front of the European theatre of World War II
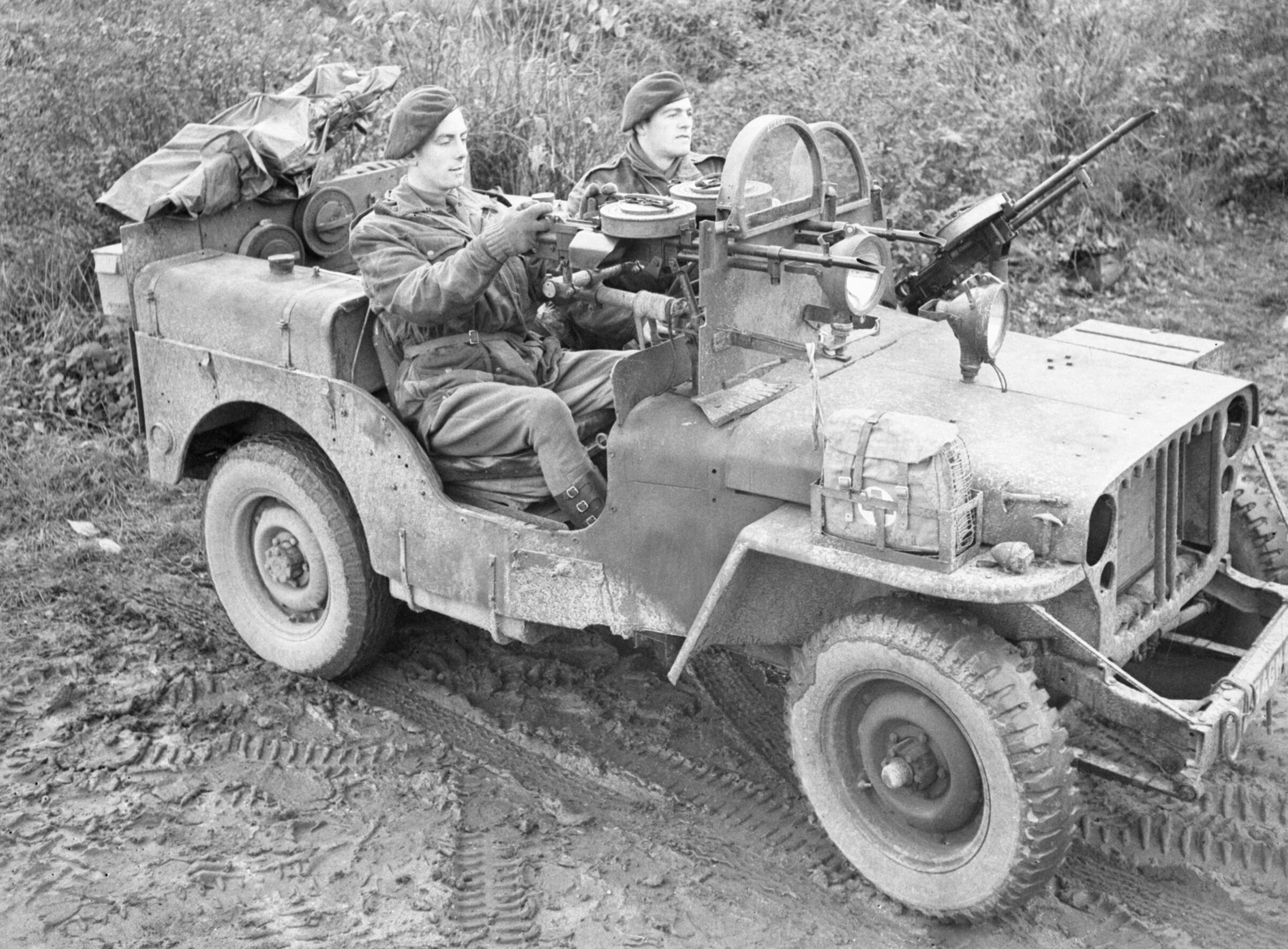
- Armed SAS Jeep of the type used in Operation Archway
Date	March–May 1945
Location	Western Germany
Result	British victory

Belligerents
United Kingdom	Germany

Commanders and leaders
(United Kingdom) Brian Franks	(Nazi Germany) Gustav-Adolf von Zangen

Units involved
(United Kingdom) Special Air Service: 1 SAS; 2 SAS	(Nazi Germany) 15th Army (elements)

Strength
300 men	

Operation Archway was the codename for one of the largest and most diverse operations carried out by the Special Air Service during the Second World War.

Archway was initially intended to support Operation Plunder and Operation Varsity, the crossings of the River Rhine at Rees, Wesel, and south of the Lippe River by the British Second Army, under Lieutenant-General Sir Miles Dempsey. It went on to support the three British Armoured Divisions in their advance into Germany until the end of the war.

The Archway force was under command of Lieutenant Colonel Brian Franks and comprised two squadrons, one each from the 1st and 2nd Special Air Service.

== Background ==
After the Normandy Landings the 1st and 2nd Special Air Service or SAS were involved in a number of operations in France, to support the Allied advance, notably Operation Bulbasket, Operation Houndsworth, Operation Loyton and Operation Wallace. Following these operations both of the Special Air Service regiments were recalled to the United Kingdom to regroup, both having suffered casualties in the French operations.

== Mission ==
Operation Archway was planned to support the XVIII Airborne Corps Operation Varsity parachute landings across the Rhine river. The force from the Special Air Service would be known as Frankforce. Named after the officer selected to command it, the commanding officer of 2nd Special Air Service, Lieutenant Colonel Brian Franks. Frankforce was made up of two reinforced Special Air Service squadrons, one each from the 1st and 2nd Special Air Service regiments. The force would number about 300 all ranks, mounted in 75 armed Jeeps, some also equipped with 3-inch mortars. They were supported by a number of 15-cwt and 3-ton trucks. The 1st Special Air Service squadron was led by Major Poat and consisted of three troops, each consisting of three sections with three Jeeps. They had a 3 in. mortar section at Squadron Headquarters which also kept a reserve of 12 Jeeps. The 2nd SAS squadron under command Major Power had a similar composition but only two troops.

Their first mission in support of the XVIII Airborne Corps consisted of reconnaissance patrols in northern Germany. They crossed the Rhine in amphibious LVT Buffalos, on the 25 March at Bislich.

Frankforce was then assigned to support the British Guards Armoured Division in the area around the Dortmund–Ems Canal. After this, until the end of the war, Frankforce worked with the 2nd Welsh Guards, the 8th King's Royal Irish Hussars and the 15th/19th The King's Royal Hussars, who were the armoured reconnaissance regiments of the Guards, 7th and 11th Armoured Divisions. The Special Air Service Jeeps being a faster and lighter alternative to the Cromwell tanks used by the armoured regiments. It was the 1st SAS squadron working with the 11th Armoured Division, who were among the first British troops into Bergen-Belsen concentration camp. They found between 50,000 and 60,000 inmates in the camp and for several days later SAS patrols assisted the Field Security Police in hunting down war criminals making several arrests. By the end of April 1945, they had reached the Elbe river, where they were joined by the Operation Keystone team, which was a squadron from 2nd SAS, under command of Major Hibbert.

== Aftermath ==
At the end of the war in Europe, both the 1st and 2nd Special Air Service regiments had returned to the United Kingdom in preparation to be redeployed to the Far East in the fight against the Empire of Japan. Before any training could start, both regiments together with the 1st Airborne Division were sent to disarm the German garrison in Norway Operation Doomsday. In August 1945 the Special Air Service regiments returned home from Norway, and in October 1945 they were officially disbanded. The British Authorities of the time could see no further use for such a force.
