= Wright Township, Dickey County, North Dakota =

Coordinates: 46°12′56.4″N 98°20′24.6″W

Wright Township is a township in Dickey County, in the U.S. state of North Dakota.

== History ==
Wright Township was named after Wilson M. Wright, a pioneer settler.
