= Guelph, North Dakota =

Unincorporated community in North Dakota, US

Coordinates: 46°01′22″N 98°14′09″W

Guelph, North Dakota is an unincorporated community located in Dickey County in southeastern North Dakota, United States. Founded in 1886 as a station for the Great Northern Railway, it was built close to the James River. The post office of the town was established on March 8, 1887, and its postmaster, Silas R. Dales, named the town for his hometown of Guelph, Ontario.
