= Dakota Lake National Wildlife Refuge =

Coordinates: 45°59′41″N 98°09′46″W

Dakota Lake National Wildlife Refuge is a National Wildlife Refuge in North Dakota. It is managed under Kulm Wetland Management District.

Dakota Lake National Wildlife Refuge was established by Executive Order 8117, signed on May 10, 1939 by President Franklin D. Roosevelt. The Refuge boundaries encompass 2,784 acres (11.27 km^{2}) of private land. A system of flooding easements and management easements allows the Service flood land within the river channel or to restrict hunting, trapping and other harassment of wildlife.

The District manages a low level dam on the James River called Dakota Lake Dam, also known as Ludden Dam or State Line Dam. Dakota Lake Dam was initially constructed by local people and the depression era Works Project Administration to raise the level of the James River, which frequently turned stagnant and toxic to cattle during summer months. The dam raises the level of the James River about one foot which holds water in old river channels, providing breeding, nesting and brood rearing habitat for many marsh dependent birds and other wildlife.

Dakota Lake National Wildlife Refuge is located in southern Dickey County, North Dakota. From Ludden, North Dakota proceed west on North Dakota Highway 11; the Refuge boundary is at the west end of town. North Dakota Highway 11 crosses the James River and the Refuge.

The James River is at the heart of major corridor for migrating birds. The Refuge is a migration stopover for many thousands of waterfowl and shore birds. Snow geese are one of the most obvious users of the Refuge during their spring and fall migrations. Sand Lake National Wildlife Refuge in South Dakota is a scant 4 miles (6.4 km) south of Dakota Lake National Wildlife Refuge.

Dakota Lake is closed to all public use; however, hunting, wildlife observation and photography can be quite good on public roads or private lands around the Refuge. April and October are good times to observe waterfowl migrations. An abundance of shorebirds migrate during late August and September.
