= Bear Creek Township, North Dakota =

Township in North Dakota, US

Coordinates: 46.1383°N 98.0905°W

Bear Creek is a township in Dickey County, North Dakota, United States. The population was 193 at the 2010 census.
