= Bonehill =

Bonehill is a surname. Notable people with the surname include:

- Bessie Bonehill (1855–1902), English vaudeville singer
- Richard Bonehill (c. 1948–2015), British actor and stuntman
- Joshua Bonehill-Paine (born 1992), English far-right nationalist

== See also ==
- Bone Hill (disambiguation)
