= 2027 Somerset Council election =

2027 local election in Somerset

- 6 May 2027

All 96 seats of Somerset Council 49 seats needed for a majority

Leader	Bill Revans	Diogo Rodrigues	Dave Mansell
Party	Liberal Democrats	Conservative	Green
Last election	61 seats, 43.6%	36 seats, 37.1%	5 seats, 8.7%
Current seats	62	31	4
Leader	Leigh Redman	John Hunt (Note: Leader of the Independent Group)	John Cook-Woodman
Party	Labour	Independent	Reform
Last election	5 seats, 5.9%	3 seats, 3.9%	Did not stand
Current seats	5	3	3
Incumbent Council control
Liberal Democrats

The 2027 Somerset Council election will take place on 6 May 2027 to elect members of Somerset Council. The number of councillors is to be reduced from 110 to 96 at this election due to a boundary review, to be elected from 90 single-member wards and 3 two-member wards. The election will take place at the same time as other local elections across the United Kingdom.

== Background ==
Somerset Council was formed following the 2022 Somerset Council election, replacing the previous two-tier local government structure of Somerset County Council and four district councils. The Liberal Democrats have controlled the council since 2022.

== Candidates by division ==
=== Crewkerne South ===
The initial Conservative candidate choice, Joshua Bonehill-Paine, was announced in August 2026, causing controversy due to his past neo-Nazi beliefs. He withdrew as a candidate on 5 August 2026.
