= Midland Continental Railroad Depot (Wimbledon, North Dakota) =

Historic railroad station in North Dakota, United States

- U.S. National Register of Historic Places
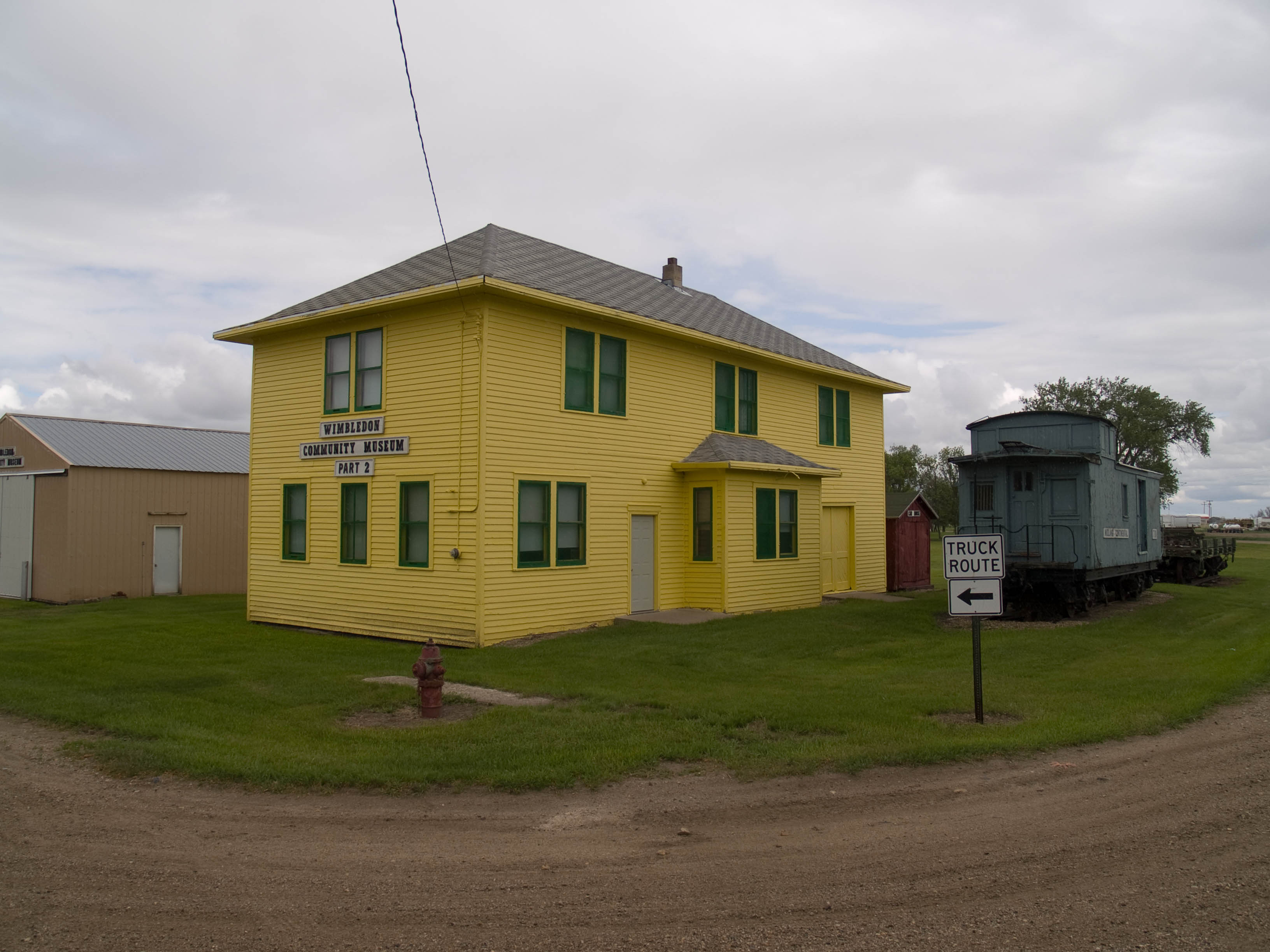
- The depot in 2008; it has since been repainted white

- Location within North Dakota Location within the United States
- Location: 401 Railway St., Wimbledon, North Dakota
- Coordinates: 47°10′14″N 98°27′33″W
- Area: less than one acre
- Built: 1913
- Built by: Midland Continental Railroad, Harry H. Hurning
- Architectural style: Pattern Depot
- NRHP reference No.: 03000870
- Added to NRHP: September 3, 2003

The Midland Continental Railroad Depot (officially renamed the Midland Continental Depot Transportation Museum Featuring Peggy Lee in 2012), is a historic railroad museum and historic home museum located at 401 Railway Street in Wimbledon, North Dakota. The building houses a museum on the history of the Midland Continental Railroad, as well as the life of American singer Peggy Lee, who lived in the depot from 1934 to 1937.

== Description and history ==
=== General ===
The depot is a combination passenger and freight depot, designed to allow one person to operate both functions. The depot is an example of balloon-frame construction, where a building's wall studs run from the building's foundation to its roof continually. It was deemed significant as the only surviving Midland Continental Railroad balloon-frame railroad station. when added to the National Register of Historic Places in 2003.

=== History ===
The depot was built in 1913 to the east of downtown Wimbledon on 17th Street SE. It was moved to its current location at 401 Railway Street in 1920. The depot served the Midland Continental Railroad's Wimbledon terminus, where the line interchanged with the Minneapolis, St. Paul and Sault Ste. Marie Railroad. In 2003, the depot was listed on the National Register of Historic Places in 2003.

== Association with Peggy Lee ==
In 1934, Marvin Olaf Egstrom, a station agent for the Midland Continental Railroad, moved into the depot with his family. His daughter, then fourteen, was American singer Peggy Lee (born Norma Deloris Egstrom). Lee helped her father run the depot, with a 1949 article from Senior Scholastic stating "she helped support the Egstrom brood by cooking for threshers and working in the fields". While living at the depot, Lee began performing as the female singer for a six-piece college dance band, traveling to various locations with the quintet on weekends. She also began performing for the radio stations KOVC and WDAY; while performing on WDAY, radio personality Kevin Kennedy first introduced her as Peggy Lee. In 1937, Lee graduated from Wimbledon High School and her family moved to another depot. Lee left North Dakota for Los Angeles, California the following year.
