= Albion Township, Dickey County, North Dakota =

Township in North Dakota, US

Coordinates: 46°04′N 98°41′W

Albion is a township in Dickey County, North Dakota, United States. The population was 7 at the 2010 census.
