= Ellendale Township, North Dakota =

Coordinates: 45.97°N 98.57°W

Ellendale Township is a township in Dickey County, North Dakota, United States.

== History ==
Ellendale Township is named for the wife of S. S. Merrill.
