= Maple Township, North Dakota =

Coordinates: 46°7′43.8″N 98°27′58.8″W

Maple Township is a township in Dickey County, in the U.S. state of North Dakota.

== History ==
Maple Township took its name from the Maple River.
