= Porter Township, Dickey County, North Dakota =

Township in Dickey County, North Dakota

Coordinates: 46°12′56.4″N 98°27′58.8″W

Porter Township is a township in Dickey County, in the U.S. state of North Dakota.

== History ==
Porter Township was named in honor of three pioneer settlers: brothers Benjamin, Charles, and Oscar Porter.
