= Midland Continental Overpass =

- Formerly listed on the U.S. National Register of Historic Places
- Location within North Dakota Location within the United States
- Nearest city: Jamestown, North Dakota
- Coordinates: 46°56′9″N 98°32′55″W
- Area: less than one acre
- Built: 1936
- Architectural style: Steel cantilever beam bridge, Other
- MPS: Historic Roadway Bridges of North Dakota MPS
- NRHP reference No.: 97000194

Significant dates
- Added to NRHP: February 27, 1997
- Removed from NRHP: July 18, 2024

The Midland Continental Overpass near Jamestown, North Dakota was a steel cantilever beam bridge that was built in 1936. It was listed on the National Register of Historic Places in 1997, and was delisted in 2024. The bridge crossed the Midland Continental Railroad track.

According to its nomination, the bridge is significant "for its association with efforts to modernize and improve North Dakota's roadway system during the New Deal era, including the state's first large-scale program of railroad-highway grade separation construction. The overpass is also eligible ... because it exhibits an unusual engineering design. The use of cantilevered spans during the historic period, such as exhibited at this structure, is rare in North Dakota." However, there are no records of the bridge's construction in county records.
