= Ellendale School District =

School district in Ellendale, North Dakota

Address
- 321 N 1st Street Ellendale, North Dakota, 58436; United States

District information
- Type: Public
- Grades: PreK–12
- NCES District ID: 3806090

Students and staff
- Students: 312
- Teachers: 31.5
- Staff: 21.9
- Student–teacher ratio: 9.9

Other information
- Website: www.ellendale.k12.nd.us

Ellendale Public School District No. 40 is a school district with a single K-12 school, Ellendale Public School, in Ellendale, North Dakota. One division is Ellendale High School (EHS).

The district, located in Dickey County, includes Ellendale, Forbes, Fullerton, and Monango.

== History ==
In 1939 the gymnasium was built, and in 1957 an elementary school was built.

On April 27, 2010, there was an election scheduled for a school bond project to build a new school. The anticipated bond would be $4 million.

== Operations ==
By 1985 it had a guidance counselor.

It has an annual publication, The Redbird. Its school newspaper is The Cardinal.

== Curriculum ==
By 1985 it had special education, computer courses, and In 1985 the school district added its first foreign language, German, to its course offerings.

== Athletics ==
In 1918 the first athletic program, boys' basketball, began at the school. By 1985 it also had a basketball team for girls and American football.
