= Monango, North Dakota =

Monango
- City
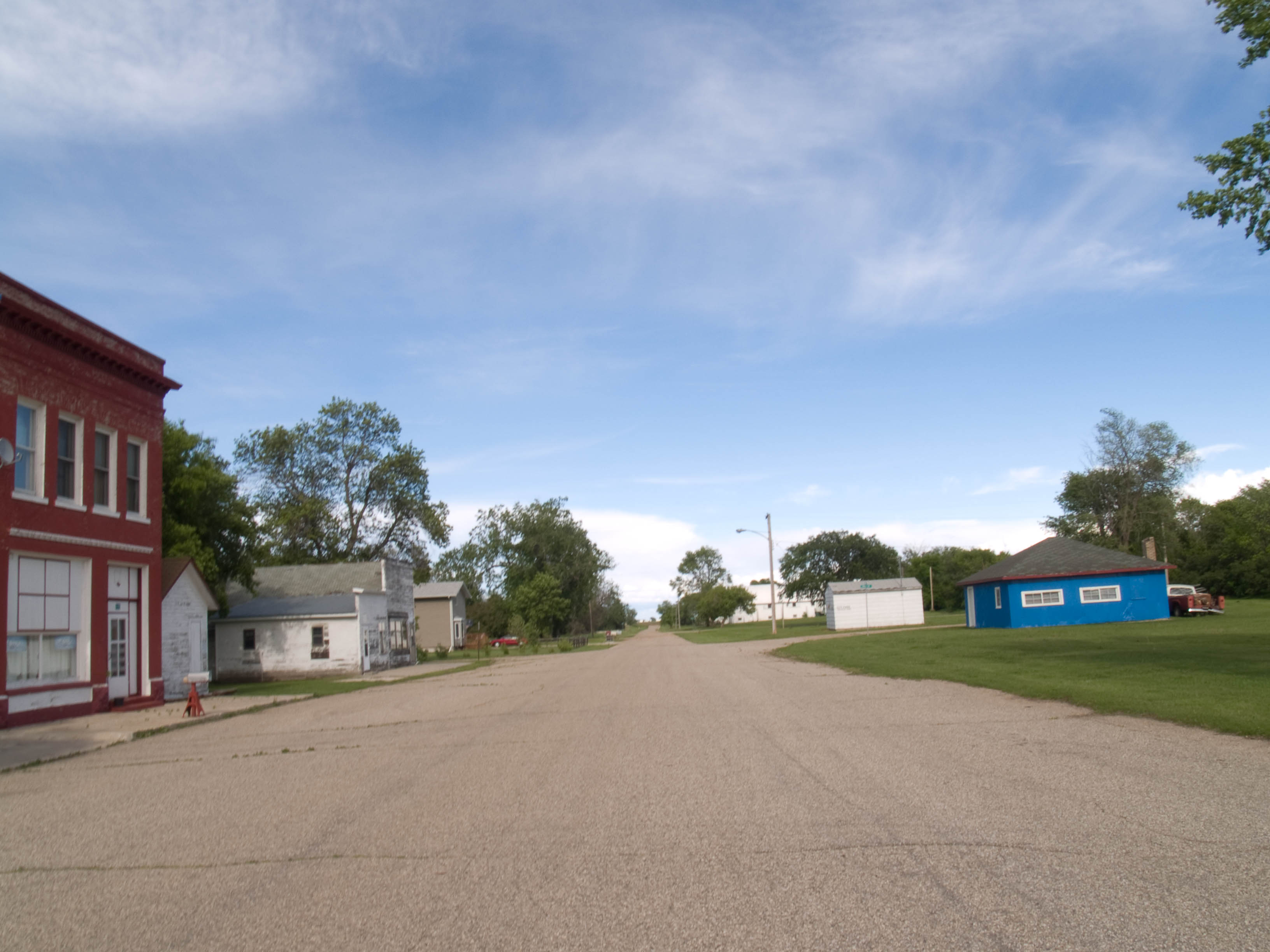
- Street in Monango

- Location of Monango, North Dakota
- Coordinates: 46°10′24″N 98°35′43″W
- Country: United States
- State: North Dakota
- County: Dickey
- Founded: 1886

Area
  - Total: 0.38 sq mi (0.98 km^{2})
  - Land: 0.38 sq mi (0.98 km^{2})
  - Water: 0 sq mi (0.00 km^{2})
- Elevation: 1,510 ft (460 m)

Population (2020)
  - Total: 30
  - Estimate (2022): 30
  - Density: 79.6/sq mi (30.74/km^{2})
- Time zone: UTC-6 (Central (CST))
  - Summer (DST): UTC-5 (CDT)
- ZIP code: 58436
- Area code: 701
- FIPS code: 38-53820
- GNIS feature ID: 1036168

Monango is a city in Dickey County, North Dakota, United States. The population was 30 at the 2020 census. Monango was founded in 1886.

== History ==
There was a $3000 (equivalent to $85,555 in 2024) church built in Keystone about 1883 during the construction of the railroad, which was used there as long as the town lasted and then it was moved to Monango, which was also a railroad town.

== Geography ==
According to the United States Census Bureau, the city has a total area of 0.37 square miles (0.96 km^{2}), all land.

== Demographics ==
Historical population
Census	Pop.	Note	%±
1910	238		—
1920	231		−2.9%
1930	211		−8.7%
1940	175		−17.1%
1950	138		−21.1%
1960	133		−3.6%
1970	112		−15.8%
1980	59		−47.3%
1990	53		−10.2%
2000	28		−47.2%
2010	36		28.6%
2020	30		−16.7%
2022 (est.)	30		0.0%
U.S. Decennial Census; 2020 Census

=== 2010 census ===
As of the census of 2010, there were 36 people, 14 households, and 7 families residing in the city. The population density was 97.3 inhabitants per square mile (37.6/km^{2}). There were 22 housing units at an average density of 59.5 per square mile (23.0/km^{2}). The racial makeup of the city was 86.1% White and 13.9% from two or more races.

There were 14 households, of which 35.7% had children under the age of 18 living with them, 50.0% were married couples living together, and 50.0% were non-families. 21.4% of all households were made up of individuals, and 7.1% had someone living alone who was 65 years of age or older. The average household size was 2.57 and the average family size was 3.00.

The median age in the city was 32 years. 30.6% of residents were under the age of 18; 8.3% were between the ages of 18 and 24; 22.3% were from 25 to 44; 22.3% were from 45 to 64; and 16.7% were 65 years of age or older. The gender makeup of the city was 44.4% male and 55.6% female.

=== 2000 census ===
As of the census of 2000, there were 28 people, 14 households, and 7 families residing in the city. The population density was 76.7 inhabitants per square mile (29.6/km^{2}). There were 18 housing units at an average density of 49.3 per square mile (19.0/km^{2}). The racial makeup of the city was 100.00% White.

There were 14 households, out of which 21.4% had children under the age of 18 living with them, 35.7% were married couples living together, 7.1% had a female householder with no husband present, and 50.0% were non-families. 50.0% of all households were made up of individuals, and 28.6% had someone living alone who was 65 years of age or older. The average household size was 2.00 and the average family size was 2.86.

In the city, the population was spread out, with 25.0% under the age of 18, 3.6% from 18 to 24, 25.0% from 25 to 44, 17.9% from 45 to 64, and 28.6% who were 65 years of age or older. The median age was 43 years. For every 100 females, there were 86.7 males. For every 100 females age 18 and over, there were 110.0 males.

The median income for a household in the city was $11,250, and the median income for a family was $28,750. Males had a median income of $32,500 versus $30,625 for females. The per capita income for the city was $15,652. There were 50.0% of families and 17.4% of the population living below the poverty line, including no under eighteens and 36.4% of those over 64.

== Education ==
Ellendale School District is the local school district.
