= Joshua Bonehill-Paine =

English political satirist and former far-right nationalist

Personal details
- Born: Joshua Mark John Bonehill-Paine; 7 December 1992 (age 33) Yeovil, Somerset, England
- Party: Conservative (2011; 2026–present)
- Other political affiliations: National Action (2015)
- Children: 3

YouTube information
- Channel: The Crewkerne Gazette
- Years active: 2025–present
- Genre: Satire
- Subscribers: 61,100
- Views: 42,065,567
- Last updated: 29 October 2026
- Website: https://crewkernegazette.co.uk/
- Criminal information
- Status: Released
- Convictions: Burglary, assault and criminal damage (2011); malicious communications and harassment (2014); inciting racial hatred (2015); racially-aggravated harassment (2016)
- Penalty: Three years and four months for inciting racial hatred in 2015; Two years for racially-aggravated harassment in 2016

Joshua Mark John Bonehill-Paine (born 7 December 1992), also known as Joshua Bonehill and by the pseudonym Crewkerne Man, is an English political satirist and Conservative Party adviser, and a former neo-Nazi, internet troll, and convicted criminal. He created the YouTube channel The Crewkerne Gazette in March 2025, which publishes AI-generated videos. He was imprisoned in 2015, but in 2018, following his release, said that he had abandoned his far-right views while in prison, and started delivering counter-extremism lectures.

Bonehill-Paine said that he began to question his previous antisemitic views after reading the Bible during his second year in prison. He has also stated that he abandoned his far-right views following the murder of Jo Cox. He completed the Home Office-accredited Healthy Identity Intervention Programme while in custody and passed the government's Prevent deradicalisation programme. He was released from prison in May 2018; following his release, he said he had delivered counter-extremism seminars to schools, police and universities focused on challenging antisemitic conspiracy theories.

Bonehill-Paine created his YouTube channel in March 2025, initially going by the pseudonym Crewkerne Man. He has been profiled in the press as a prominent figure in the emerging genre of AI-assisted political satire. Bonehill-Paine was publicly revealed as being the real identity of the Crewkerne Man in February 2026; he apologised for his past antisemitism.

In August 2026, Bonehill-Paine was selected as the Conservative Party candidate for the Crewkerne South ward in the 2027 Somerset Council election. Party leader Kemi Badenoch defended the selection, but it was criticised by Jewish groups and opposition politicians, and on 5 August he withdrew his candidacy. Badenoch then appointed him as an adviser to the Conservative Party's Culture and Integration Commission, with a focus on how young men become radicalised. Badenoch said she was "glad he is going to work with me and the party on tackling radicalisation". The appointment was criticised by Labour, the Liberal Democrats and Reform UK.

== Early life ==
Joshua Mark John Bonehill-Paine was born in Yeovil, Somerset. He went to a public school. After being expelled from school for fighting, his parents put him in the foster care system at the age of 13, missing most of his education before retaking his GCSEs at college.

He then joined the Conservative Party, seeking to become a Conservative candidate in the 2011 South Somerset District Council election. After failing to be selected, on 11 March 2011 he broke into and burgled a police station in Chard, Somerset using his Conservative Party membership card, while drunk. He was discovered by a constable outside the station in the early hours wearing a police uniform, and noted their poor security. He resisted efforts to arrest him, assaulting two officers in the process, and was found guilty of the offences of burglary, assault and criminal damage, also pleading guilty to criminal damage committed on 30 March to a flower bed in Yeovil. Bonehill-Paine was sentenced to a 12-month community order with 100 hours' unpaid work and supervision by the probation service.

In 2013, Bonehill-Paine announced plans to lead a "Stand Strong" march in Woolwich, a month after the murder of Lee Rigby, describing it as a protest against "extremism, terrorism and oppression".

In February 2014, Bonehill-Paine appeared in court in Yeovil on charges of malicious communications on Facebook, relating to comments regarding the UK Independence Party leader Nigel Farage, in October the previous year. That September, Bonehill-Paine announced that he was in the process of registering a political party in Yeovil, called the National British Resistance party. He described it as having "ambitions to replace the British National Party (BNP) and gain mainstream support", with the intention of contesting elections in a countering violent extremism programme.

== Political views ==
Bonehill-Paine is a member of the Conservative Party, which he joined in 2026, and has said he is an executive member of the party's Yeovil branch. He has said that before rejoining the Conservatives he had applied to become a Reform UK councillor, and that he rejoined because of his support for party leader Kemi Badenoch. In an earlier 2026 interview with The Times, he said that his "personal politics oscillated between the Conservatives and Reform" and that he had received a Christmas card from Badenoch, while adding that "no party was off limits" in his satire. Jewish News described The Crewkerne Gazette as supportive of Badenoch while mocking the Labour and Reform UK parties. Since August 2026 he has been an adviser to the Conservative Party's Culture and Integration Commission.

== Political candidate ==
On 3 August 2026 Bonehill-Paine was selected as the Conservative candidate for the 2027 Somerset Council election in the Crewkerne South ward of Somerset. His selection was criticised by former Labour MP Baroness Berger, whose racial aggravated harassment by Bonehill-Paine in 2016 led to him being convicted and jailed. Conservative leader Kemi Badenoch defended his candidacy, saying he had been rehabilitated and that her party "believes in second chances". After some controversy, he withdrew his candidacy on 5 August

== Criminal acts, convictions, and imprisonment ==
=== Malicious claims on blog ===
Bonehill-Paine's blog, The Daily Bale, ran hoax stories which were repeated as fact on social media, as well as false accusations against his opponents. He described himself as "a proud anti-semite". A story from The Daily Bale went viral in August 2013, falsely reporting that The Globe pub in Leicester had refused to admit members of the armed forces, so as not to offend immigrants. People who had read the story threatened the pub with arson and made death threats to the owners. Bonehill-Paine stated in an interview that his intention was to create "a shocking campaign" that people would "share quickly on social media". Security expert Graham Cluley called the stunt "utterly irresponsible and frankly moronic". In April 2014, Bonehill-Paine was sentenced to 180 hours of unpaid work and two years supervision for malicious communications over this incident. A year later, for breaching this community order, magistrates added another 10 hours of unpaid work to the sentence.

In February 2014, a hoax story about a six-year-old girl from Croydon being kidnapped by an Asian child grooming gang was shared on social media. A September 2014 story made false claims about an Asian youth punching a baby and throwing it against a wall, which Bonehill-Paine later said had been written by an English Defence League member and published "without researching the actual article first". The next month, Bonehill-Paine's blog spread a hoax that a Somali immigrant with Ebola had gone missing in Leicester. A fake NHS poster making this claim was publicised by Bonehill-Paine's website, reportedly distributed by one of his supporters in Leicester, and seen in a medical centre in the city.

In October 2014, he pleaded guilty to charges of malicious communications and harassment relating to articles on his Daily Bale blog falsely claiming that innocent people were paedophiles, drug dealers or religious zealots. During one hearing, he took issue with being called an "Internet troll" by the prosecutor, Dafydd Paxton. Sentencing was postponed until 12 January 2015 due to other "very serious" investigations involving him, including alleged incitement to racial hatred against a Member of Parliament, and later postponed again until 5 February. The hearing eventually took place on 9 February 2015, when he was given a three-month prison sentence suspended for 18 months, in addition to 80 hours' unpaid work and ten sessions of "education, training and employment". He was ordered to pay £85 costs and a victim surcharge of £80.

=== Public order offences and tweets to Jack Monroe ===
In February 2015, Bonehill-Paine was due to be charged in St Albans under s.38 of the Public Order Act 1986, the "contamination of goods", for publishing an article on his website suggesting that fruit and vegetables from Tesco were infected with Ebola. The offence carries a maximum 10-year sentence. In October 2015, he was tried at Stevenage Magistrates' Court for "misusing a public computer network to propagate grossly offensive, indecent, obscene or menacing material" in two online articles, one being the Tesco Ebola hoax and the other encouraging the immediate killing of disabled babies for the purpose of eugenics. The district judge cleared him of both charges citing the freedom of speech guaranteed by the Human Rights Act.

In April 2015, Bonehill-Paine claimed to have been the man arrested and released on bail on suspicion of sending "hate" tweets to Jack Monroe, a Guardian columnist. The tweets were made by a hoax account purporting to be from a former UKIP candidate, and UKIP reported the account to the police. In a statement on his website, Bonehill-Paine did not admit responsibility, but said that the tweets were "of a comical nature and [I] commend the level of free speech used".

In May 2015, Bonehill-Paine pleaded not guilty to a charge of harassment after it was alleged that he had left a swastika in the home of a Hertfordshire woman with whom he had spent two nights, describing it as a gift that had been touched by Adolf Hitler, before sending her a string of abusive messages and letters and asking her to become "his Eva". The case was adjourned until 15 July.

=== Antisemitic protests ===
In January 2015, Bonehill-Paine called for a "mass protest" in March that year against what he perceived as the "complete Jewification" of Stamford Hill in north London, an area with the UK's largest ultra-orthodox Charedi population, with particular focus on the volunteer neighbourhood watch group, Shomrim, which he falsely asserts is an illegal religious police force. The Community Security Trust (CST) was in talks with local police, and local Jewish leaders were described as calm about the threat. Dave Rich, a CST spokesman said that Bonehill-Paine had "a long record of racist provocation and antisemitic abuse but he doesn't have much record of being able to mobilise large numbers of people on the street". Bonehill-Paine's protest was later cancelled due to lack of support.

In February 2015, Bonehill-Paine was arrested by police officers investigating allegations of inciting racial hatred relating to "two visual and written publications on the internet", and released on bail. He was arrested on suspicion of "racially aggravated harassment and malicious communications".

In June 2015, Bonehill-Paine announced his intention to join a New Dawn Party demonstration in Golders Green, an area of north London with a large Jewish minority, on Saturday 4 July 2015. He stated his intention to destroy Israeli flags by hand and tread upon them (believing that by not burning the flags he could "avoid prosecution") and said he would be burning copies of the Talmud, a Jewish holy book, in a "private ceremony". Posts to Bonehill-Paine's website featured Auschwitz-Birkenau imagery and said that the demonstration would be an "absolute gas". On 25 June, he was arrested by the Metropolitan Police and charged with inciting racial hatred contrary to the Public Order Act 1986. Four days later, he was remanded in custody at Westminster Magistrates' Court. He was refused bail at a Southwark Crown Court hearing on 13 July. At the next hearing on 21 September, he pleaded "absolutely not guilty" and was again remanded in custody.

The trial began at Southwark Crown Court on 14 December 2015. Mark Weekes for the prosecution described a poster on Bonehill-Paine's website which he invited visitors to print off to publicise the intended march on 4 July. The poster included an image of Auschwitz and a stereotyped cartoon of a Jewish man being sprayed with weedkiller, under the slogan "Join us on July 4 for what promises to be an absolute gas!" with an SS lightning bolt in the 'O' of Golders Green. Weekes said the poster "trivialises and mocks the death of millions of Jews during the Third Reich" and considered the use of Nazi imagery in reference to an area with a large Jewish population to be "incitement". On 16 December, Bonehill-Paine was convicted of inciting racial hatred against Jews. He was sentenced to three years and four months imprisonment.

Bonehill-Paine was held at HM Prison Manchester and HM Prison Wandsworth. In January 2016, he was investigated by the Prison Service for letters to fans, inside envelopes with drawings of Hitler, the September 11 attacks and Harold Shipman. In the letters, he mocked taxpayers for the £120,000 costs of holding him in prison and spoke of plans to stand for election as a member of parliament in Bradford when eligible five years after his release. The Appeal Court upheld the length of Bonehill-Paine's sentence in May 2016. He also spoke of a desire to run for MP of Yeovil, his home constituency, in order to build a "rural utopia" that would "ignite the fire" to spread throughout the country.

=== Harassment of Luciana Berger ===
In October 2014, Bonehill-Paine was investigated by police over antisemitic comments about the Labour MP Luciana Berger published on his website, after Garron Helm, a member of National Action, was imprisoned for sending antisemitic messages to her.

On 15 February 2015, it was reported that Bonehill-Paine had been arrested on suspicion of having sent antisemitic tweets to Berger. On 14 June 2016, he was charged with the racially or religiously aggravated harassment of Berger between October 2014 and February 2015. At a hearing at the Old Bailey on 19 July 2016, with Bonehill-Paine participating via a video link, he was sent for trial.

The trial began on 5 December 2016. The court heard that Bonehill-Paine had posted five "hateful and insulting" about Berger, holding her responsible for the imprisonment of another far-right activist, whom he considered a comrade. His defence counsel said Bonehill-Paine would not be giving evidence at the trial, but asserted that the defendant in posting his "pathetic, puerile rubbish" was, however, living in a country "where everyone is entitled to a voice".

On 7 December 2016, Bonehill-Paine was convicted of racially-aggravated harassment. The following day, he was imprisoned for two years, this new custodial term to be added to the existing sentence. A criminal behaviour order was imposed to restrict his internet use after his eventual release, including the barring of any attempt to contact Berger and other listed individuals, and the police were authorised to monitor his online activities for five years.

== Counter-extremism work ==
Bonehill-Paine says that he first questioned his antisemitic views during his second year in prison, after reading the Bible, and enrolled on a deradicalisation course via his probation officer. He was released from prison in May 2018, and said that he had agreed to deliver lectures in a counter-extremism programme, educating about the dangers of antisemitism in schools and universities.

He became a cryptocurrency investor and worked as a director of a web services firm. He moved back to Somerset in 2025.

== The Crewkerne Gazette ==
Bonehill-Paine created The Crewkerne Gazette YouTube channel in March 2025, initially going by the anonymous pseudonym Crewkerne Man. He cites comedians Harry Enfield and Paul Whitehouse as inspirations. The channel targets primarily Labour Party politicians; he said that he supports voting for Reform UK or a broader coalition of right-wing parties.

A profile in The Times in February 2026 described The Crewkerne Gazette as a fast-turnaround AI political satire account, reporting that it had amassed about 130,000 social-media followers and generated more than 200 million views, and noting that videos were sometimes uploaded shortly after major Westminster events such as Prime Minister's Questions.

In September 2025, the channel released the AI-generated satirical rap video How Many Homes Can Rayner Buy?, which mocked deputy prime minister and housing secretary Angela Rayner amid reporting about her property and stamp duty controversy. The Evening Standard described the video as having "gone viral", reporting that it had amassed hundreds of thousands of views online. A later profile in The Spectator said the video had been watched around 11 million times on social media, and credited it with significantly increasing attention on the channel and its use of generative AI for rapid political satire. The video was also referenced in subsequent press coverage discussing similar AI political parody content released by the channel.

The Crewkerne Gazette gained media attention in November 2025 after a rap video about Keir Starmer and Beth Rigby went viral.

In a profile for The Spectator, Max Jeffery described the Crewkerne Man as "the most important political satirist of the moment", crediting the channel's rapid-response format and high view counts with helping its videos break into mainstream attention. Jonathan Baz, writing for The Times of Israel, described the Crewkerne Gazette as being produced by "creative wizards" and as "merciless" in its parodies of leading British political figures. The Times also reported that the creator had been referred to by fans as the "Banksy of politics", noting the channel's large online reach and its fast production cycle after political events such as Prime Minister's Questions.

Bonehill-Paine publicly identified himself as the "Crewkerne Man" in a video published on The Crewkerne Gazette on 10 February 2026, shortly after UK TV Channel 4 News contacted him to say that they intended to report his identity.

=== Discography ===
Date	Artist	Single	UK Singles Sales Chart
26 December 2025	Crewkerne Gazette	"Take a Dump on Number 10"	#3

== Personal life ==
Bonehill-Paine met Lucy Silcocks in the summer of 2019, after his release from prison, and the couple became engaged in February 2020. They lived together in Crewkerne and had three sons, born in 2020, 2021 and 2024.

Silcocks, an artist, died on 20 October 2026, aged 32. Announcing her death on X, Bonehill-Paine said she had been struggling with her mental health since the summer, and described her as "the love of my life and my soulmate". He said that press attention, and remarks about his past from figures in and around Reform UK, had weighed heavily on her.
