= Dickey County, North Dakota =

County in North Dakota, United States

- County
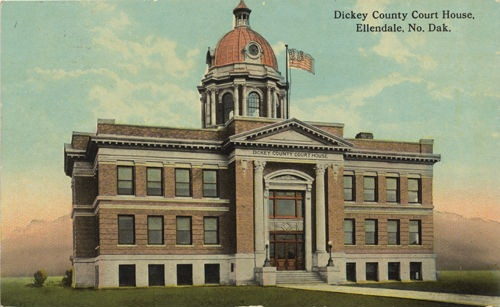
- Postcard of Dickey County Courthouse in 1915

- Location within the U.S. state of North Dakota
- Coordinates: 46.107756°N 98.496518°W
- Country: United States
- State: North Dakota
- Founded: March 5, 1881 (created); August 18, 1882 (organized)
- Named for: George H. Dickey
- Seat: Ellendale
- Largest city: Oakes

Area
  - Total: 1,142.157 sq mi (2,958.17 km^{2})
  - Land: 1,131.493 sq mi (2,930.55 km^{2})
  - Water: 10.664 sq mi (27.62 km^{2}) 0.93%

Population (2020)
  - Total: 4,999
  - Estimate (2025): 4,895 ▼
  - Density: 4.3/sq mi (1.7/km^{2})
- Time zone: UTC−6 (Central)
  - Summer (DST): UTC−5 (CDT)
- Area code: 701
- Congressional district: At-large
- Website: dickeynd.com

Dickey County is a county in the U.S. state of North Dakota. As of the 2020 census, the population was 4,999 and was estimated to be 4,895 in 2025. The county seat is Ellendale and the largest city is Oakes.

== History ==
The Dakota Territory legislature created Dickey County on March 5, 1881, with territories annexed from McPherson County, South Dakota; and Ransom County, North Dakota with some previously unorganized territories added. It was organized on August 18, 1882. It was named for a member of the Territorial Legislature, George H. Dickey.

== Geography ==
Dickey County lies on the south side of North Dakota. Its south boundary line abuts the north boundary line of the state of South Dakota. The James River flows south-southeasterly through the east part of the county, and the Maple River flows south-southeasterly through the center part of the county. The county terrain consists of rolling hills, dotted with lakes and ponds in its western portion, with the area devoted to agriculture. The terrain slopes to the south and east, with its highest point being a hill near the southwestern corner at 2,139 ft (652 m) ASL.

According to the United States Census Bureau, the county has a total area of 1,142.157 square miles (2,958.17 km^{2}), of which 1,131.493 square miles (2,930.55 km^{2}) is land and 10.664 square miles (27.62 km^{2}) (0.93%) is water. It is the 31st largest county in North Dakota by total area.

=== Major highways ===
- U.S. Highway 281
- North Dakota Highway 1
- North Dakota Highway 11
- North Dakota Highway 13
- North Dakota Highway 56

=== Adjacent counties ===
- LaMoure County - north
- Ransom County - northeast
- Sargent County - east
- Brown County, South Dakota - south
- McPherson County, South Dakota - southwest
- McIntosh County - west

=== National protected areas ===
- Dakota Lake National Wildlife Refuge
- Maple River National Wildlife Refuge

=== Lakes ===
- Hilles Lake
- Pheasant Lake

== Demographics ==
Historical population
Census	Pop.	Note	%±
1890	5,573		—
1900	6,061		8.8%
1910	9,839		62.3%
1920	10,499		6.7%
1930	10,877		3.6%
1940	9,696		−10.9%
1950	9,121		−5.9%
1960	8,147		−10.7%
1970	6,976		−14.4%
1980	7,207		3.3%
1990	6,107		−15.3%
2000	5,757		−5.7%
2010	5,289		−8.1%
2020	4,999		−5.5%
2025 (est.)	4,895		−2.1%
U.S. Decennial Census:

As of the fourth quarter of 2024, the median home value in Dickey County was $177,052. As of the 2023 American Community Survey, there are 1,953 estimated households in Dickey County with an average of 2.37 persons per household. The county has a median household income of $63,125. Approximately 11.5% of the county's population lives at or below the poverty line. Dickey County has an estimated 66.1% employment rate, with 27.1% of the population holding a bachelor's degree or higher and 91.4% holding a high school diploma.

The top five reported ancestries (people were allowed to report up to two ancestries, thus the figures will generally add to more than 100%) were English (94.5%), Spanish (1.9%), Indo-European (2.9%), Asian and Pacific Islander (0.6%), and Other (0.0%). The median age in the county was 38.6 years.

Dickey County, North Dakota – racial and ethnic composition
Note: the US Census treats Hispanic/Latino as an ethnic category. This table excludes Latinos from the racial categories and assigns them to a separate category. Hispanics/Latinos may be of any race.

Race / ethnicity (NH = non-Hispanic)	Pop. 1980	Pop. 1990	Pop. 2000	Pop. 2010	Pop. 2020
White alone (NH)	7,134 (98.99%)	6,032 (98.77%)	5,584 (96.99%)	5,044 (95.37%)	4,572 (91.46%)
Black or African American alone (NH)	1 (0.01%)	8 (0.13%)	6 (0.10%)	35 (0.66%)	19 (0.38%)
Native American or Alaska Native alone (NH)	11 (0.15%)	21 (0.34%)	20 (0.35%)	30 (0.57%)	26 (0.52%)
Asian alone (NH)	27 (0.37%)	13 (0.21%)	29 (0.50%)	22 (0.42%)	27 (0.54%)
Pacific Islander alone (NH)	—	—	0 (0.00%)	1 (0.02%)	0 (0.00%)
Other race alone (NH)	12 (0.17%)	0 (0.00%)	1 (0.02%)	1 (0.02%)	17 (0.34%)
Mixed race or multiracial (NH)	—	—	39 (0.68%)	56 (1.06%)	139 (2.78%)
Hispanic or Latino (any race)	22 (0.31%)	33 (0.54%)	78 (1.35%)	100 (1.89%)	199 (3.98%)
Total	7,207 (100.00%)	6,107 (100.00%)	5,757 (100.00%)	5,289 (100.00%)	4,999 (100.00%)

=== 2024 estimate ===
As of the 2024 estimate, there were 4,930 people and 1,953 households residing in the county. There were 2,392 housing units at an average density of 2.11 per square mile (0.8/km^{2}). The racial makeup of the county was 94.7% White (91.5% NH White), 0.8% African American, 1.4% Native American, 1.2% Asian, 0.0% Pacific Islander, _% from some other races and 2.0% from two or more races. Hispanic or Latino people of any race were 4.2% of the population.

=== 2020 census ===
As of the 2020 census, there were 4,999 people, 1,985 households, and 1,249 families residing in the county. Of the residents, 24.5% were under the age of 18 and 21.6% were 65 years of age or older; the median age was 41.5 years. For every 100 females there were 102.7 males, and for every 100 females age 18 and over there were 101.5 males. The population density was 4.4 inhabitants per square mile (1.7/km^{2}). The 2,383 housing units had an average density of 2.11 per square mile (0.8/km^{2}). The racial makeup of the county was 92.6% White, 0.6% African American, 0.6% Native American, 0.6% Asian, 0.0% Pacific Islander, 1.6% from some other races and 4.1% from two or more races. Hispanic or Latino people of any race were 4.0% of the population. There were 1,985 households in the county, of which 28.6% had children under the age of 18 living with them and 21.6% had a female householder with no spouse or partner present. About 32.1% of all households were made up of individuals and 15.6% had someone living alone who was 65 years of age or older. Of the housing units, 16.7% were vacant. Among occupied housing units, 74.7% were owner-occupied and 25.3% were renter-occupied. The homeowner vacancy rate was 2.8% and the rental vacancy rate was 18.3%.

=== 2010 census ===
As of the 2010 census, there were 5,289 people, 2,180 households, and 1,379 families residing in the county. The population density was 4.7 inhabitants per square mile (1.8/km^{2}). There were 2,636 housing units at an average density of 2.33 per square mile (0.9/km^{2}). The racial makeup of the county was 96.50% White, 0.70% African American, 0.59% Native American, 0.42% Asian, 0.02% Pacific Islander, 0.55% from some other races and 1.23% from two or more races. Hispanic or Latino people of any race were 1.89% of the population. In terms of ancestry, 56.3% were German, 16.9% were Norwegian, 11.4% were Irish, 7.4% were Swedish, 5.1% were Russian, and 1.1% were American.

Of 2,180 households in the county, 26.5% had children under the age of 18 living with them, 56.0% were married couples living together, 4.4% had a female householder with no husband present, 36.7% were non-families, and 33.3% of all households were made up of individuals. The average household size was 2.29 and the average family size was 2.94. The median age was 43.0 years.

The median income for a household in the county was $37,179 and the median income for a family was $53,333. Males had a median income of $36,029 versus $25,625 for females. The per capita income for the county was $21,824. About 6.8% of families and 11.0% of the population were below the poverty line, including 9.3% of those under age 18 and 18.2% of those age 65 or over.

== Communities ==
=== Cities ===
- Ellendale (county seat)
- Forbes
- Fullerton
- Monango
- Ludden
- Oakes

=== Unincorporated communities ===
- Glover
- Guelph
- Keystone
- Silverleaf
- Wirch

== Former communities ==
- Merricourt

== Government ==
=== Townships ===
Administration of certain aspects of county government in North Dakota are assigned to subsidiary townships.

- Ada
- Albertha
- Albion
- Bear Creek
- Clement
- Divide
- Elden
- Ellendale
- Elm
- German
- Grand Valley
- Hamburg
- Hudson
- James River Valley
- Kent
- Kentner
- Keystone
- Lorraine
- Lovell
- Maple
- Northwest
- Port Emma
- Porter
- Potsdam
- Riverdale
- Spring Valley
- Valley
- Van Meter
- Whitestone
- Wright
- Yorktown
- Young

== Politics ==
Dickey County voters are traditionally Republican-leaning. In only one national election since 1936 (1964) has the county selected the Democratic Party candidate (as of 2024).

United States presidential election results for Dickey County, North Dakota
Year	Republican		Democratic		Third party(ies)	
Year	No.	%	No.	%	No.	%
1900	763	56.19%	567	41.75%	28	2.06%
1904	998	69.64%	336	23.45%	99	6.91%
1908	1,062	60.96%	633	36.34%	47	2.70%
1912	494	29.90%	723	43.77%	435	26.33%
1916	1,037	50.12%	920	44.47%	112	5.41%
1920	2,887	75.79%	766	20.11%	156	4.10%
1924	1,716	43.66%	352	8.96%	1,862	47.38%
1928	2,250	52.90%	1,977	46.48%	26	0.61%
1932	1,424	30.67%	3,068	66.08%	151	3.25%
1936	1,533	34.39%	2,287	51.30%	638	14.31%
1940	2,777	57.44%	1,721	35.59%	337	6.97%
1944	2,134	61.11%	1,339	38.34%	19	0.54%
1948	1,774	54.89%	1,264	39.11%	194	6.00%
1952	2,917	71.23%	1,150	28.08%	28	0.68%
1956	2,327	61.72%	1,435	38.06%	8	0.21%
1960	2,420	62.76%	1,433	37.16%	3	0.08%
1964	1,808	49.81%	1,818	50.08%	4	0.11%
1968	2,087	62.34%	1,098	32.80%	163	4.87%
1972	2,277	63.59%	1,266	35.35%	38	1.06%
1976	2,027	54.65%	1,612	43.46%	70	1.89%
1980	2,455	68.69%	917	25.66%	202	5.65%
1984	2,460	69.37%	1,051	29.64%	35	0.99%
1988	2,064	61.87%	1,249	37.44%	23	0.69%
1992	1,514	49.48%	918	30.00%	628	20.52%
1996	1,418	53.21%	953	35.76%	294	11.03%
2000	1,853	66.51%	806	28.93%	127	4.56%
2004	1,890	67.00%	883	31.30%	48	1.70%
2008	1,525	58.21%	1,044	39.85%	51	1.95%
2012	1,610	63.51%	853	33.65%	72	2.84%
2016	1,667	69.26%	554	23.02%	186	7.73%
2020	1,742	71.86%	608	25.08%	74	3.05%
2024	1,829	74.56%	557	22.71%	67	2.73%

== Education ==
School districts include:

- Ashley Public School District 9
- Edgeley Public School District 3
- Ellendale Public School District 40
- Kulm Public School District 7
- LaMoure Public School District 8
- Oakes Public School District 41

== See also ==
- National Register of Historic Places listings in Dickey County, North Dakota
