= St. Lawrence, South Dakota =

- Town
- Etymology: Saint Lawrence River
- Location in Hand County and the state of South Dakota
- Coordinates: 44°31′00″N 98°56′16″W
- Country: United States
- State: South Dakota
- County: Hand
- Settled: 1881

Area
  - Total: 0.34 sq mi (0.89 km^{2})
  - Land: 0.34 sq mi (0.89 km^{2})
  - Water: 0 sq mi (0.00 km^{2})
- Elevation: 1,572 ft (479 m)

Population (2020)
  - Total: 163
  - Density: 475.4/sq mi (183.56/km^{2})
- Time zone: UTC-6 (CST)
  - Summer (DST): UTC-5 (CDT)
- ZIP Code: 57373
- Area code: 605
- FIPS code: 46-57180
- GNIS feature ID: 1267559

St. Lawrence or Saint Lawrence is a town in central Hand County, South Dakota, United States. The population was 164 at the 2020 census.

== History ==
The first settlement at St. Lawrence was made in 1881. A post office has been in operation since 1882. The town was named after the Saint Lawrence River.

== Geography ==
According to the United States Census Bureau, the town has a total area of 0.34 square miles (0.88 km^{2}), all land.

== Demographics ==
Historical population
Census	Pop.	Note	%±
1890	320		—
1900	115		−64.1%
1910	305		165.2%
1920	390		27.9%
1930	413		5.9%
1940	297		−28.1%
1950	261		−12.1%
1960	290		11.1%
1970	249		−14.1%
1980	223		−10.4%
1990	223		0.0%
2000	210		−5.8%
2010	198		−5.7%
2020	163		−17.7%
U.S. Decennial Census

=== 2010 census ===
As of the census of 2010, there were 198 people, 74 households, and 53 families residing in the town. The population density was 582.4 inhabitants per square mile (224.9/km^{2}). There were 90 housing units at an average density of 264.7 units per square mile (102.2 units/km^{2}). The racial makeup of the town was 99.0% White, 0.5% Native American, and 0.5% from two or more races.

There were 74 households, of which 29.7% had children under the age of 18 living with them, 52.7% were married couples living together, 9.5% had a female householder with no husband present, 9.5% had a male householder with no wife present, and 28.4% were non-families. 18.9% of all households were made up of individuals, and 12.2% had someone living alone who was 65 years of age or older. The average household size was 2.68 and the average family size was 2.96.

The median age in the town was 42.6 years. 23.2% of residents were under the age of 18; 8.2% were between the ages of 18 and 24; 22.8% were from 25 to 44; 25.4% were from 45 to 64; and 20.7% were 65 years of age or older. The gender makeup of the town was 52.5% male and 47.5% female.

=== 2000 census ===
As of the census of 2000, there were 210 people, 90 households, and 63 families residing in the town. The population density was 137.5 inhabitants per square mile (53.1/km^{2}). There were 104 housing units at an average density of 68.1 units per square mile (26.3 units/km^{2}). The racial makeup of the town was 98.57% White, and 1.43% from two or more races. Hispanic or Latino of any race were 1.43% of the population.

There were 90 households, out of which 28.9% had children under the age of 18 living with them, 58.9% were married couples living together, 10.0% had a female householder with no husband present, and 28.9% were non-families. 25.6% of all households were made up of individuals, and 18.9% had someone living alone who was 65 years of age or older. The average household size was 2.33 and the average family size was 2.80.

In the town, the population was spread out, with 22.4% under the age of 18, 7.6% from 18 to 24, 21.9% from 25 to 44, 22.9% from 45 to 64, and 25.2% who were 65 years of age or older. The median age was 44 years. For every 100 females, there were 89.2 males. For every 100 females age 18 and over, there were 87.4 males.

The median income for a household in the town was $32,031, and the median income for a family was $34,583. Males had a median income of $20,357 versus $14,464 for females. The per capita income for the town was $13,300. About 9.0% of families and 13.1% of the population were below the poverty line, including 23.2% of those under the age of eighteen and 4.5% of those 65 or over.

== See also ==
- List of towns in South Dakota
