= Bone Hill (Missouri) =

Hill in Missouri, U.S.

Coordinates: 39°06′24″N 94°08′22″W

Bone Hill is a summit in Jackson County in the U.S. state of Missouri. It has an elevation of 925 feet (282 m).

Bone Hill was named from the belief Indian bones were interred there.
