= Forbes, North Dakota =

- City
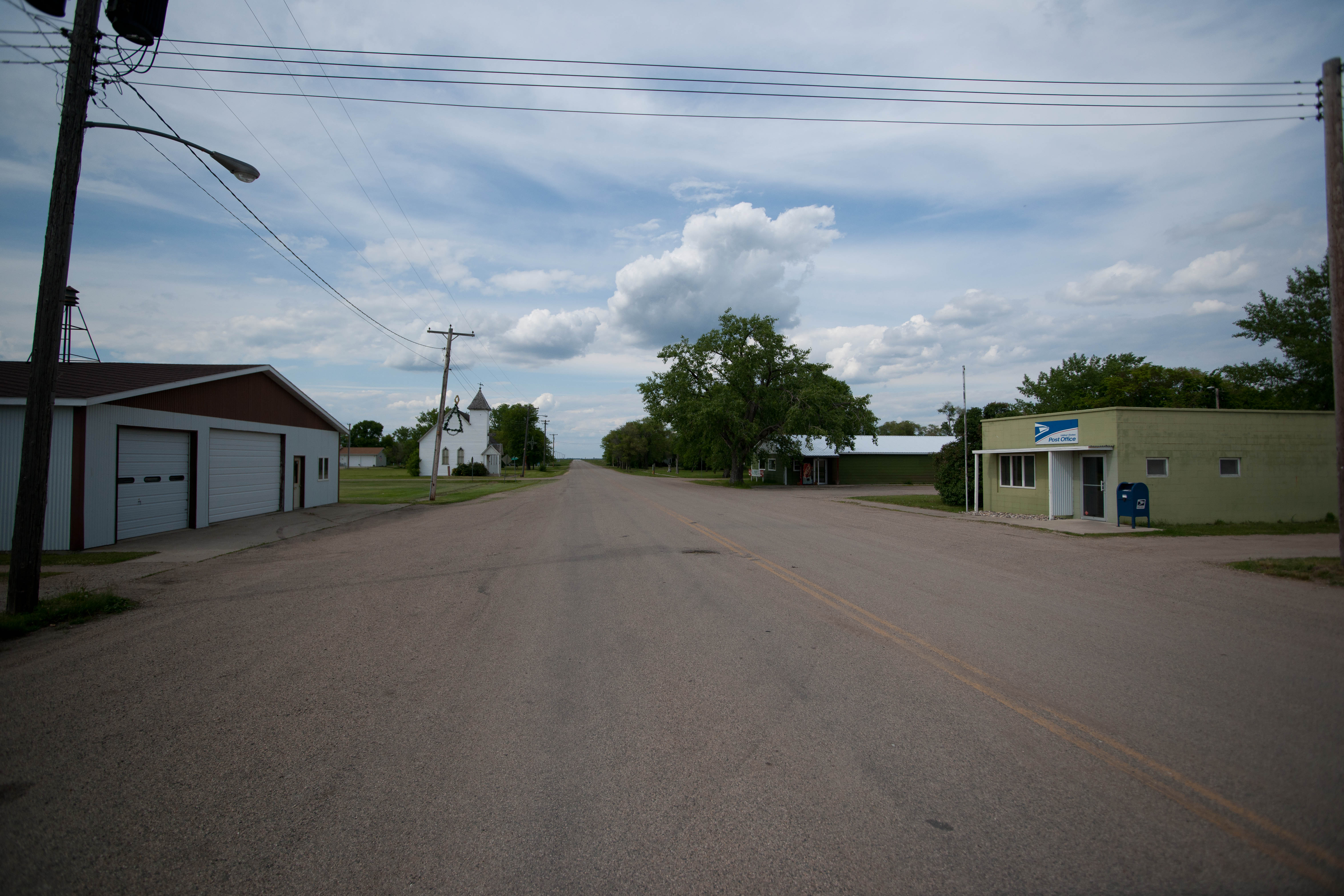
- Street in Forbes

- Location of Forbes, ND
- Coordinates: 45°56′33″N 98°46′55″W
- Country: United States
- State: North Dakota
- County: Dickey
- Founded: 1905

Area
  - Total: 0.24 sq mi (0.63 km^{2})
  - Land: 0.24 sq mi (0.63 km^{2})
  - Water: 0 sq mi (0.00 km^{2})
- Elevation: 1,558 ft (475 m)

Population (2020)
  - Total: 36
  - Density: 148.7/sq mi (57.42/km^{2})
- Time zone: UTC-6 (CST)
  - Summer (DST): UTC-5 (CDT)
- ZIP code: 58439
- Area code: 701
- FIPS code: 38-26980
- GNIS feature ID: 1036036

Forbes is a city in Dickey County, North Dakota, United States. The population was 36 at the 2020 census.

== History ==
Forbes was founded in 1905. The town was named after Mr. S. F. Forbes, a railroad agent and town merchant. Former Governor and US Senator John Hoeven spent time there at the Hoeven Ranch owned by his grandparents. Navy Rear Admiral Stuart Munsch's father taught school at the Forbes Public School. Senator Tim Flakoll (R), Senator Don Moore (R) and Rep. Jim Brokaw (D) all are, or continue to live in Forbes. The People's Store in Forbes is the source of the World-famous Forbes Sausage.

On April 23, 2019 Forbes earned "Town of The Week" from KVRR TV when it received 1,406 online votes.

In 1924, its first year, the Forbes School District graduated seven students. Their last graduating class was in 1987 when five students graduated.

Thousands of people attended the Forbes Centennial in July 2005. Special guests included Governor John Hoeven and his father Jack as well as North Dakota Attorney General Wayne Stenehjem.

== Geography ==
Forbes is located on the North Dakota - South Dakota border.

According to the United States Census Bureau, the city has a total area of 0.25 square miles (0.65 km^{2}), all land.

== Demographics ==
Historical population
Census	Pop.	Note	%±
1910	221		—
1920	293		32.6%
1930	265		−9.6%
1940	268		1.1%
1950	204		−23.9%
1960	138		−32.4%
1970	88		−36.2%
1980	84		−4.5%
1990	72		−14.3%
2000	64		−11.1%
2010	53		−17.2%
2020	36		−32.1%
2021 (est.)	39		8.3%
U.S. Decennial Census; 2020 Census

=== 2010 census ===
As of the census of 2010, there were 53 people, 29 households, and 16 families residing in the city. The population density was 212.0 inhabitants per square mile (81.9/km^{2}). There were 41 housing units at an average density of 164.0 per square mile (63.3/km^{2}). The racial makeup of the city was 100.0% White.

There were 29 households, of which 13.8% had children under the age of 18 living with them, 48.3% were married couples living together, 3.4% had a female householder with no husband present, 3.4% had a male householder with no wife present, and 44.8% were non-families. 41.4% of all households were made up of individuals, and 17.2% had someone living alone who was 65 years of age or older. The average household size was 1.83 and the average family size was 2.44.

The median age in the city was 58.8 years. 11.3% of residents were under the age of 18; 5.7% were between the ages of 18 and 24; 9.5% were from 25 to 44; 30.2% were from 45 to 64; and 43.4% were 65 years of age or older. The gender makeup of the city was 50.9% male and 49.1% female.

=== 2000 census ===
As of the census of 2000, there were 64 people, 33 households, and 17 families residing in the city. The population density was 262.2 inhabitants per square mile (101.2/km^{2}). There were 39 housing units at an average density of 159.8 per square mile (61.7/km^{2}). The racial makeup of the city was 100.00% White.

There were 33 households, out of which 21.2% had children under the age of 18 living with them, 45.5% were married couples living together, 6.1% had a female householder with no husband present, and 45.5% were non-families. 42.4% of all households were made up of individuals, and 18.2% had someone living alone who was 65 years of age or older. The average household size was 1.94 and the average family size was 2.67.

In the city, the population was spread out, with 21.9% under the age of 18, 20.3% from 25 to 44, 12.5% from 45 to 64, and 45.3% who were 65 years of age or older. The median age was 52 years. For every 100 females, there were 113.3 males. For every 100 females age 18 and over, there were 127.3 males.

The median income for a household in the city was $18,958, and the median income for a family was $33,750. Males had a median income of $16,875 versus $24,375 for females. The per capita income for the city was $16,741. There were 10.0% of families and 30.0% of the population living below the poverty line, including 53.3% of under eighteens and 14.8% of those over 64.

== Education ==
Ellendale School District is the local school district.
