= Albertha Township, North Dakota =

Township in North Dakota, US

Coordinates: 45°58′55″N 98°56′30″W

Albertha Township is a township in Dickey County, North Dakota, United States. The population was 23 at the 2010 census.
