= Yorktown Township, Dickey County, North Dakota =

Coordinates: 46°07′43.8″N 98°20′24.6″W

Yorktown Township is a township in Dickey County, in the U.S. state of North Dakota.

== History ==
Yorktown Township was named after New York, the US state of origin of several early settlers.
