= Sutton, North Dakota =

- Census-designated place
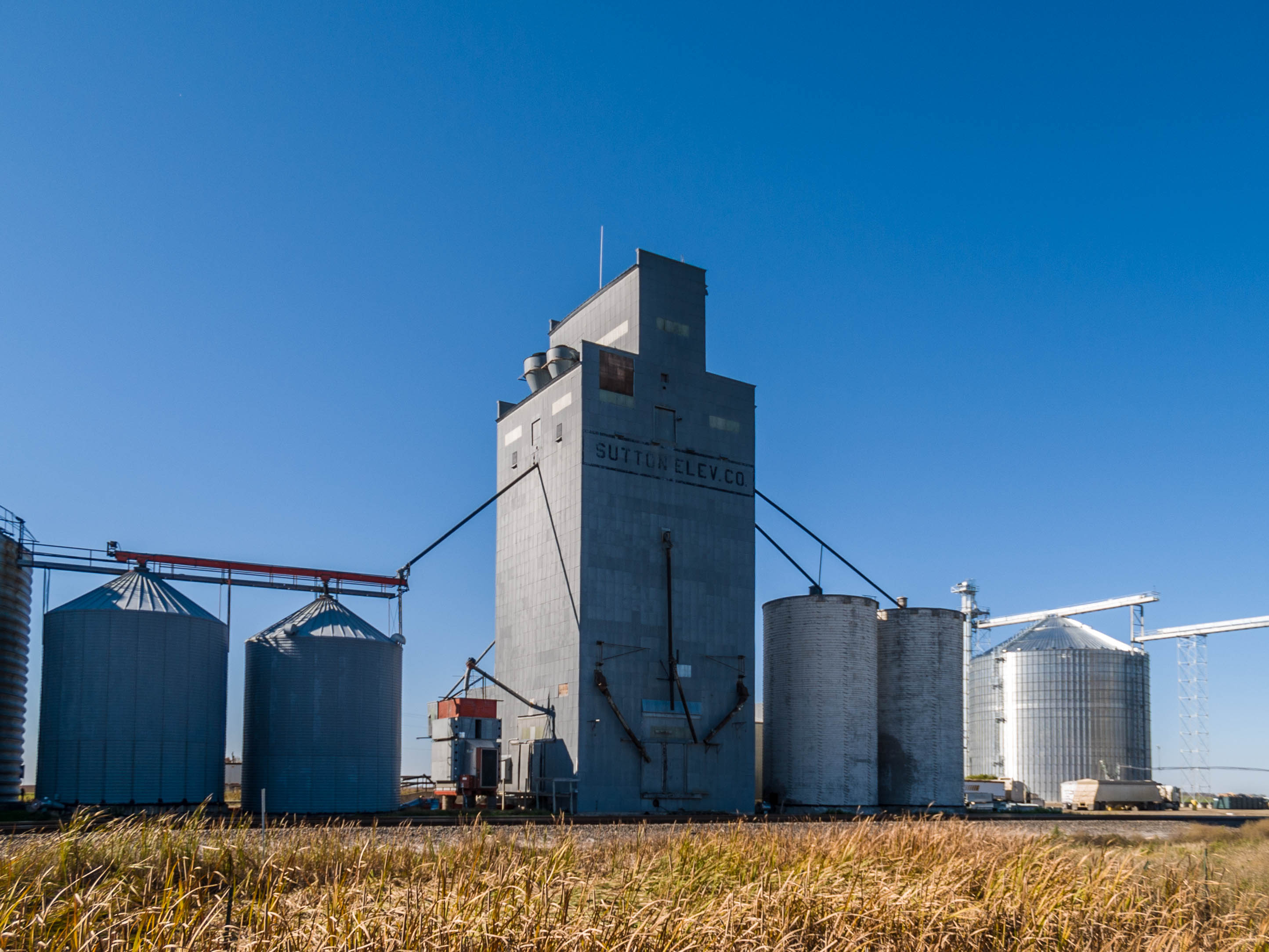
- Grain elevator in Sutton

- Location within North Dakota Location within the United States
- Coordinates: 47°24′7″N 98°26′21″W
- Country: United States
- State: North Dakota
- County: Griggs

Area
  - Total: 0.20 sq mi (0.53 km^{2})
  - Land: 0.20 sq mi (0.53 km^{2})
  - Water: 0 sq mi (0.00 km^{2})
- Elevation: 1,470 ft (450 m)

Population (2020)
  - Total: 17
  - Density: 83.0/sq mi (32.06/km^{2})
- Time zone: UTC-6 (Central (CST))
  - Summer (DST): UTC-5 (CDT)
- ZIP codes: 58484
- Area code: 701
- FIPS code: 38-77260
- GNIS feature ID: 2584358

Sutton is a census-designated place in western Griggs County, North Dakota, United States. An unincorporated community, it was designated as part of the U.S. Census Bureau's Participant Statistical Areas Program on March 31, 2010. It was not counted separately during the 2000 Census, but was included in the 2010 Census. As of the 2020 census, Sutton had a population of 17.

It lies west of the city of Cooperstown, the county seat of Griggs County. It had a post office with the ZIP code 58484.

== Demographics ==
Historical population
| Census | Pop. | Note | %± |
|---|---|---|---|
| 2020 | 17 | | — |
U.S. Decennial Census
