= Keystone (gasoline automobile) =

Defunct American motor vehicle manufacturer

Keystone was used as the marque of two brass era automobile companies.

== History ==
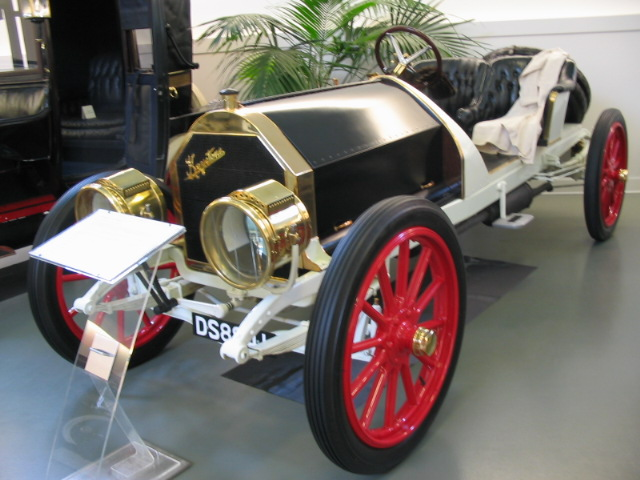
The Keystone Six - 1910

The Keystone and Keystone Six were built for the Munch-Allen Motor Car Company of DuBois, Pa. Howard Motor Works in Yonkers, NY, built the first thirty cars before production moved to DuBois in 1909. In 1910 production returned to Yonkers shortly before the company failed. The Keystone Six was a 60 horsepower six-cylinder automobile on a 122-inch wheelbase. All body styles cost $2,250, equivalent to $77,746 in 2025.

The second Keystone was an American automobile manufactured from 1914 until 1915. Designed by Chas C. Snodgrass and built in Pittsburgh, it used a Rutenber 55 hp six engine. It was built on a 138-inch wheelbase. It failed before a company could be set up to sell it.

== See also ==
- Brass Era vehicles
- Keystone Six at ConceptCarz
