= George H. Dickey =

American politician

George H. Dickey (1858–1923) was an American lawyer from Valley City, North Dakota. He served in the Territorial House of Representatives of the Dakota Territory Legislative Assembly in 1881–1882. Dickey County, North Dakota is named in his honor.
