= Bridge line =

Type of American rail carrier

A bridge line or bridge route or bridge traffic relates to an American rail carrier tasked primarily with moving traffic from one major carrier to another (hence the "bridge" moniker). Bridge lines often were located between two major cities, connecting rail carriers that served those cities and interchanging their cars. As railroads have continued to evolve and large Class I railroads have sought to keep cars on line (as well as collect the revenues for the tonnage moved over their own route miles), most bridge lines are now gone.

The most recent example of a "bridge" carrier being swallowed up was the Wisconsin Central. The WC was a bridge line for Canadian National's traffic out of Chicago to western Canada. Once CN had integrated its purchase of Illinois Central, there was no route for it to send trains to points in western Canada on its own rails. Rather than reroute the trains through Michigan and around the Great Lakes, CN used the WC to forward its trains through Wisconsin and Minnesota to Canada. Eventually, CN bought the WC outright and integrated the line into its system, rather than pay the carrier to move its freight.
