= Bone Hill National Wildlife Refuge =

Protected area in North Dakota, United States

Coordinates: 46°33′04″N 98°51′42″W

Bone Hill National Wildlife Refuge is a National Wildlife Refuge in North Dakota. It is managed under Kulm Wetland Management District.

Bone Hill National Wildlife Refuge was established by Executive Order 8112, signed on May 10, 1939 by President Franklin D. Roosevelt. The Refuge boundaries encompass 640 acres (2.6 km^{2}) of private land. A system of management easements allows the District staff to maintain a dam on the property and restrict hunting, trapping and other harassment of wildlife.

Bone Hill Refuge is located in LaMoure County, North Dakota. From Jud, North Dakota the northwest corner of the Refuge is 2 miles (3.2 km) north and one mile (1.6 km) east on county and township roads.

The Refuge is a migration stopover for waterfowl. Snow geese frequently stop in the neighborhood surrounding the Refuge during spring and fall migrations. Much of the Refuge lands are cultivated by the owner; however, some waterfowl nesting and brood rearing takes place on the reservoir and pasture portions of the Refuge.

This is a limited-interest national wildlife refuge. The FWS has an easement on private property allowing it to manage wildlife habitat, but the land remains private property. There is no public access but wildlife may be observed from adjacent public roads. Limited-interest refuges were created in the 1930s and 1940s in response to declining waterfowl populations and the need to get people back to work during the Great Depression. Many landowners sold easements allowing the federal government to regulate water levels and restrict hunting.
