= Keystone, North Dakota =

Coordinates: 46.18136°N 98.55038°W

Keystone is a former unincorporated community (ghost town) in Keystone Township, Dickey County, North Dakota, United States.

== History ==
Keystone was originally built up by settlers from Pennsylvania, and the name taken from that state's nickname, the Keystone State. The beginning of Keystone was about a mile north of where the town was finally established. There was a $3000 (equivalent to $85,555 in 2024) church built in Keystone which was used there as long as the town lasted and then it was moved to Monango.

== See also ==
- List of ghost towns in North Dakota
