= Operation Keystone =

WW2 SAS operation in N. Europe 1945

Operation Keystone was a British special forces operation carried out by a Jeep-mounted Squadron of the 2nd Special Air Service under the command of Major Henry Carey Druce, with the objectives of interfering with German movements to the south of the IJsselmeer in the German-occupied Netherlands and capturing bridges over the Apeldoorn Canal to assist Operation Cannonshot.
