= Ellendale, North Dakota =

- City
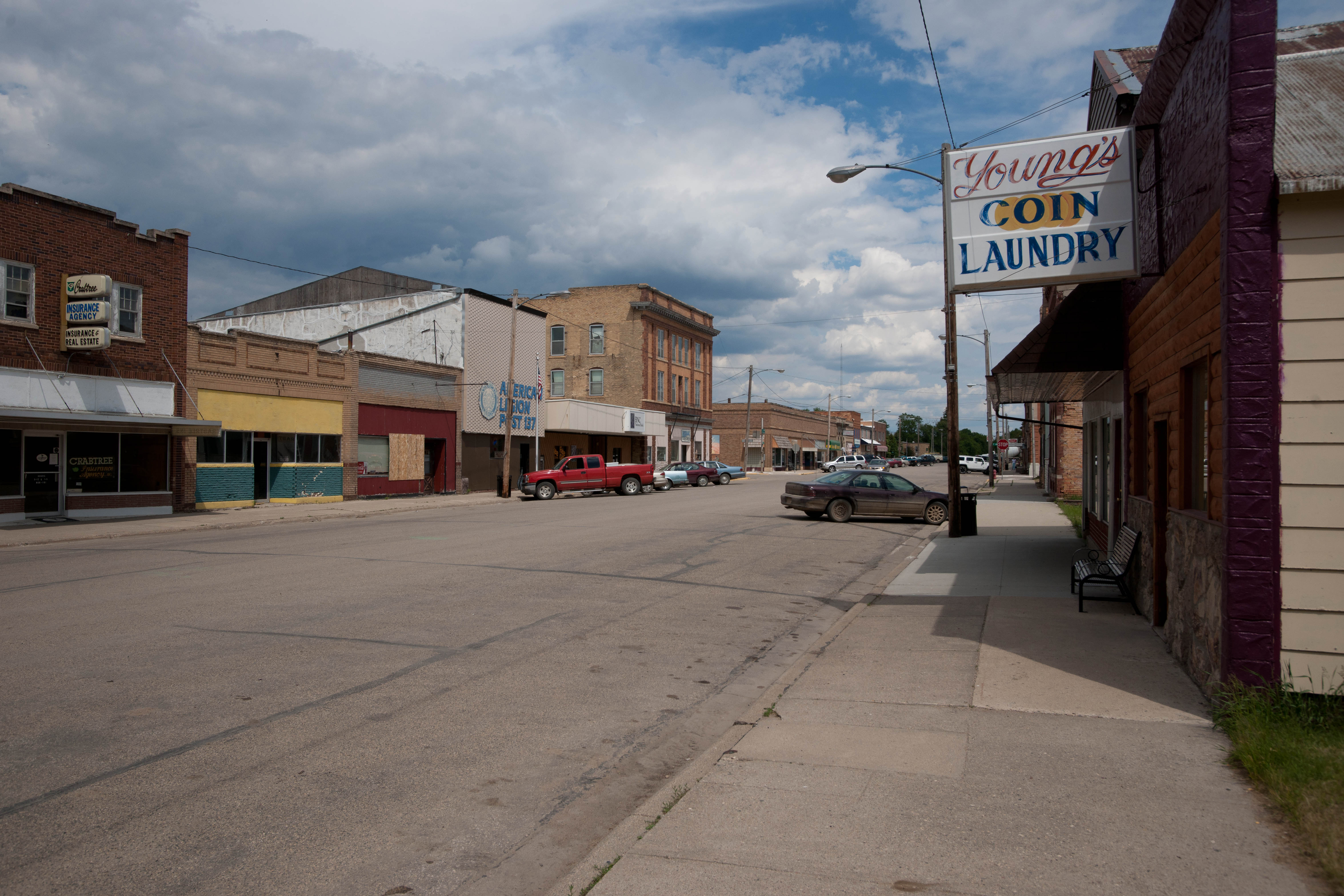
- Downtown Ellendale

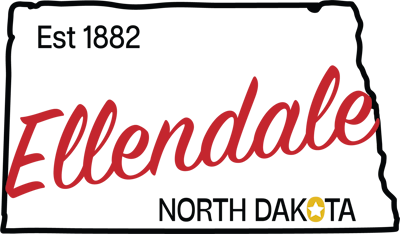
- Logo

- Location of Ellendale, North Dakota
- Coordinates: 46°00′15″N 98°31′31″W
- Country: United States
- State: North Dakota
- County: Dickey
- Founded: 1882

Government
  - Mayor: Matt Thorpe

Area
  - Total: 1.42 sq mi (3.67 km^{2})
  - Land: 1.42 sq mi (3.67 km^{2})
  - Water: 0 sq mi (0.00 km^{2})
- Elevation: 1,453 ft (443 m)

Population (2020)
  - Total: 1,125
  - Estimate (2022): 1,099
  - Density: 793.8/sq mi (306.48/km^{2})
- Time zone: UTC-6 (Central (CST))
  - Summer (DST): UTC-5 (CDT)
- ZIP code: 58436
- Area code: 701
- FIPS code: 38-23220
- GNIS feature ID: 1036021
- Highways: US 281, ND 11
- Website: ellendalend.gov

Ellendale is a city in Dickey County, North Dakota, United States. It is the county seat of Dickey County. The population was 1,125 at the 2020 census. Ellendale was founded in 1882. Ellendale is the home of Trinity Bible College, located on the former campus of the North Dakota State Normal and Industrial School and the Ellendale Opera House currently under renovation.

== History ==
Ellendale was established as county seat of the newly formed Dickey County in 1882. That same year saw the arrival of the Chicago, Milwaukee, St. Paul and Pacific Railroad into the area.

Ellendale is named for the wife of S. S. Merrill.

== Geography ==
According to the United States Census Bureau, the city has a total area of 1.52 square miles (3.94 km^{2}), all land.

== Demographics ==
Historical population
Census	Pop.	Note	%±
1890	761		—
1900	750		−1.4%
1910	1,389		85.2%
1920	1,334		−4.0%
1930	1,264		−5.2%
1940	1,517		20.0%
1950	1,759		16.0%
1960	1,800		2.3%
1970	1,517		−15.7%
1980	1,967		29.7%
1990	1,798		−8.6%
2000	1,559		−13.3%
2010	1,394		−10.6%
2020	1,125		−19.3%
2022 (est.)	1,099		−2.3%
U.S. Decennial Census; 2020 Census

=== 2010 census ===
As of the census of 2010, there were 1,394 people, 562 households, and 313 families living in the city. The population density was 917.1 inhabitants per square mile (354.1/km^{2}). There were 698 housing units at an average density of 459.2 per square mile (177.3/km^{2}). The racial makeup of the city was 94.5% White, 1.2% African American, 1.7% Native American, 0.2% Asian, 0.1% Pacific Islander, 0.4% from other races, and 1.9% from two or more races. Hispanic or Latino of any race were 1.2% of the population.

There were 562 households, of which 23.3% had children under the age of 18 living with them, 46.8% were married couples living together, 7.5% had a female householder with no husband present, 1.4% had a male householder with no wife present, and 44.3% were non-families. 40.9% of all households were made up of individuals, and 17.7% had someone living alone who was 65 years of age or older. The average household size was 2.11 and the average family size was 2.90.

The median age in the city was 37.3 years. 20.3% of residents were under the age of 18; 17.8% were between the ages of 18 and 24; 19.6% were from 25 to 44; 21.8% were from 45 to 64; and 20.7% were 65 years of age or older. The gender makeup of the city was 48.1% male and 51.9% female.

=== 2000 census ===
As of the census of 2000, there were 1,559 people, 603 households, and 355 families living in the city. The population density was 1,083.6 inhabitants per square mile (418.4/km^{2}). There were 750 housing units at an average density of 521.3 per square mile (201.3/km^{2}). The racial makeup of the city was 97.56% White, 0.13% African American, 0.96% Native American, 0.13% Asian, 0.45% from other races, and 0.77% from two or more races. Hispanic or Latino of any race were 0.64% of the population.

There were 603 households, out of which 24.4% had children under the age of 18 living with them, 49.4% were married couples living together, 8.0% had a female householder with no husband present, and 41.1% were non-families. 39.6% of all households were made up of individuals, and 24.4% had someone living alone who was 65 years of age or older. The average household size was 2.12 and the average family size was 2.84.

In the city, the population was spread out, with 18.7% under the age of 18, 20.1% from 18 to 24, 18.6% from 25 to 44, 18.5% from 45 to 64, and 24.1% who were 65 years of age or older. The median age was 38 years. For every 100 females, there were 85.2 males. For every 100 females age 18 and over, there were 76.0 males.

The median income for a household in the city was $22,850, and the median income for a family was $32,292. Males had a median income of $22,452 versus $14,861 for females. The per capita income for the city was $12,668. About 17.4% of families and 21.0% of the population were below the poverty line, including 30.0% of those under age 18 and 14.1% of those age 65 or over.

== Education ==
Primary and secondary

- Ellendale School District (Ellendale High School)

Tertiary

- Trinity Bible College

== Climate ==
This climatic region is typified by large seasonal temperature differences, with warm to hot (and often humid) summers and cold (sometimes severely cold) winters. According to the Köppen Climate Classification system, Ellendale has a humid continental climate, abbreviated "Dfb" on climate maps. Ellendale has an average annual snowfall of 35.3 inches (89.6 cm).

== Notable people ==
- LeRoy H. Anderson, U.S. representative from Montana
- Charles Halsted, Minnesota state representative
- Phil Hansen, NFL player
- Scot Kelsh, North Dakota state representative
- Debra Mooney, actress
- Pete Retzlaff, NFL player and executive
