= National Register of Historic Places listings in Faulk County, South Dakota =

Location of Faulk County in South Dakota

This is a list of the National Register of Historic Places listings in Faulk County, South Dakota.

This is intended to be a complete list of the properties on the National Register of Historic Places in Faulk County, South Dakota, United States. The locations of National Register properties for which the latitude and longitude coordinates are included below, may be seen in a map.

There are 10 properties listed on the National Register in the county.

This National Park Service list is complete through NPS recent listings posted March 21, 2025.

== Current listings ==
	Name on the Register	Image	Date listed	Location	City or town	Description
1	Gov. Frank M. Byrne House	Gov. Frank M. Byrne House	January 30, 1992 (#91002044)	1017 St. John St. 45°01′58″N 99°07′40″W	Faulkton	
2	Dr. William Edgerton House		November 29, 2010 (#10000951)	308 Tenth Ave. S. 45°02′14″N 99°07′38″W	Faulkton	
3	Faulk County Courthouse	Faulk County Courthouse	February 10, 1993 (#92001857)	Junction of 9th Ave. and Court St. 45°02′02″N 99°07′34″W	Faulkton	
4	Faulkton American Legion Hall	Faulkton American Legion Hall	February 10, 2005 (#05000034)	107 8th Ave., N. 45°02′15″N 99°07′26″W	Faulkton	
5	C.W. Parker Carousel No. 825		July 31, 2017 (#100001399)	109 9th Ave. S. 45°02′02″N 99°07′32″W	Faulkton	
6	Maj. John A. Pickler Homestead		April 11, 1973 (#73001742)	Southern edge of the Faulkton city limits 45°01′38″N 99°07′28″W	Faulkton	
7	Sievers School		February 25, 2014 (#14000031)	NE. corner of 362nd Ave. & 170th St. 44°55′34″N 98°56′25″W	Rockham	
8	South Dakota Dept. of Transportation Bridge No. 25-218-141		December 9, 1993 (#93001288)	10th Ave. over the south fork of Snake Creek; 45°02′28″N 99°07′41″W	Faulkton	
9	South Dakota Dept. of Transportation Bridge No. 25-380-142		December 9, 1993 (#93001262)	Local road over the south fork of Snake Creek; 45°02′20″N 98°47′53″W	Zell	Replaced in 1997
10	Frank and Clara Turner House	Frank and Clara Turner House	February 13, 1986 (#86000245)	1006 Main; 45°02′08″N 99°08′00″W	Faulkton	

== See also ==
- List of National Historic Landmarks in South Dakota
- National Register of Historic Places listings in South Dakota
