= Tornado outbreak of August 24, 2006 =

Group of sudden tornadoes around South Dakota

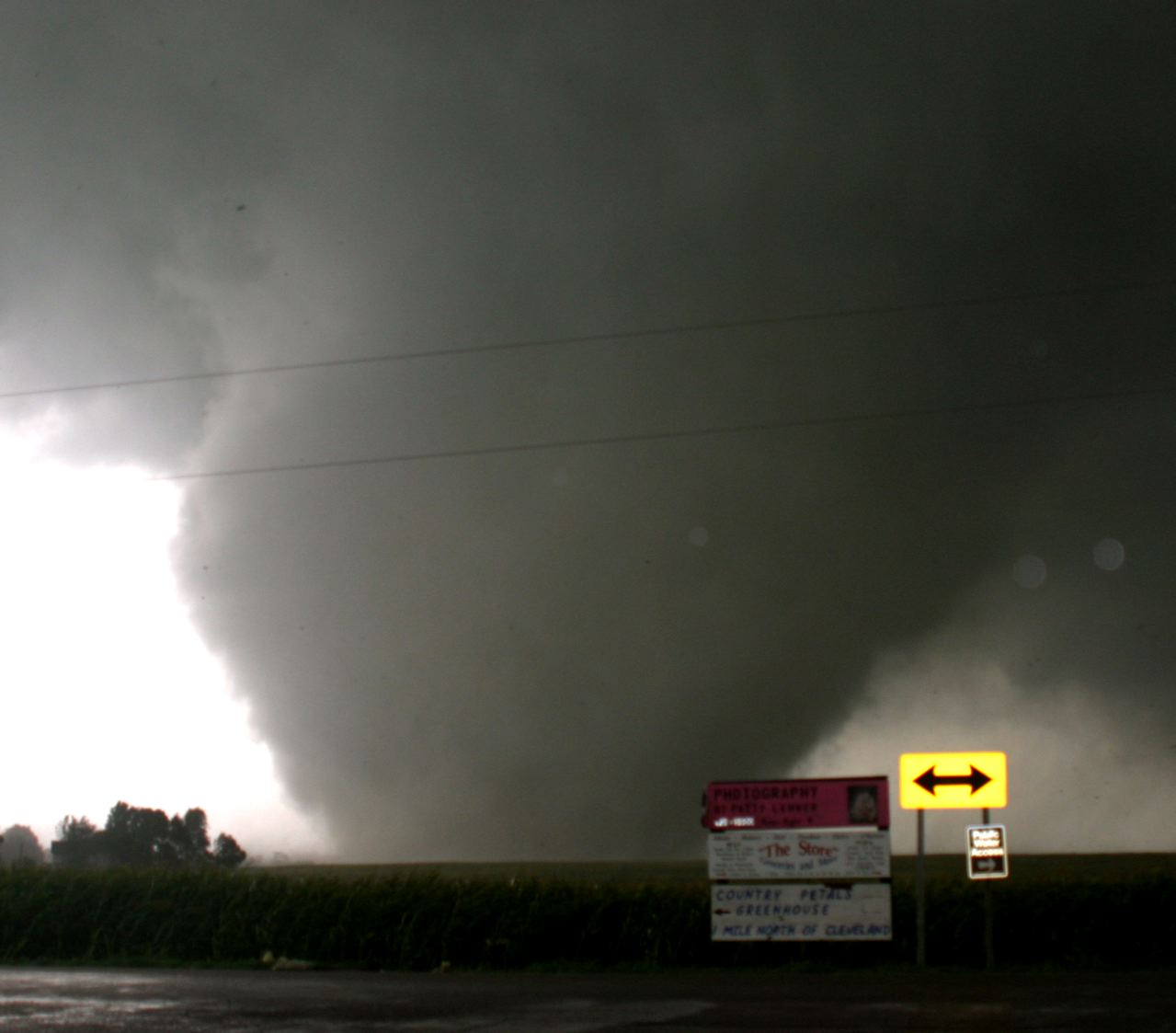
- The Nicollet/Kasota, Minnesota, F3 tornado.

Meteorological history
- Duration: August 24, 2006

Tornado outbreak
- Tornadoes: 14 confirmed
- Max. rating: F3 tornado
- Duration: ~13 hours

Overall effects
- Casualties: 1 fatality, 40 injuries
- Damage: > $44 million (+ $130 million non-tornadic)
- Areas affected: Upper Midwest

The Tornado outbreak of August 24, 2006, was an outbreak of 14 tornadoes in North Dakota, South Dakota, and Minnesota on August 24, 2006. The outbreak spawned three F3 tornadoes, one of which caused a fatality in Kasota, Minnesota. The severe weather outbreak also produced many reports of severe hail which caused $130 million in damage across several states.

== Outbreak description ==
A moderate risk of severe weather was issued by the SPC for August 24, with a significant threat for tornadoes, some of which could be strong. The main threat area ran from North Dakota southeastward into Minnesota and northern Iowa to western Wisconsin.

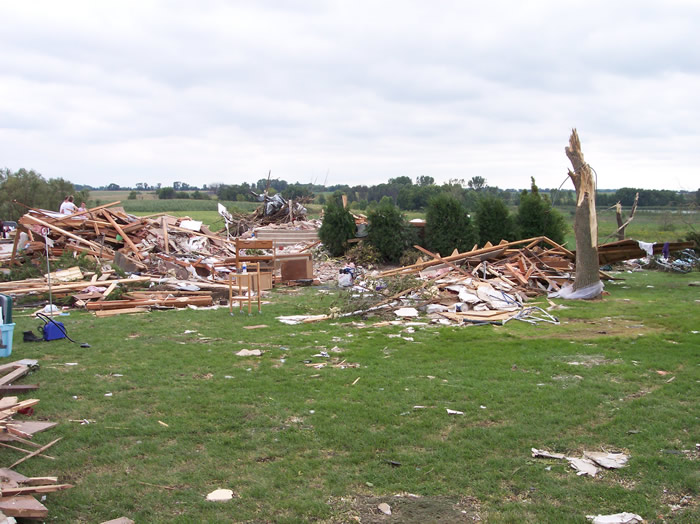
Damage from the tornado in Kasota, Minnesota

The tornadoes began about noon central time in North Dakota, with three tornadoes produced there. Then, during the mid-afternoon hours, 11 more tornadoes touched down, 9 of which were in South Dakota. Two of the tornadoes in South Dakota were rated F3 on the Fujita scale - one of which touched passed near the town of Wolsey and another near Eureka. The Wosley storm was one of four tornadoes spawned in the same area from Wessington to Cavour. The three others storms in Beadle County were rated from F0 to F2.

The most destructive tornado of the day was a multiple vortex F3 tornado that hit the Minnesota cities of Nicollet and Kasota. It tracked a path of 33 miles, killed one person, and caused $30 million in damages. This tornado passed near but did not hit the city of St. Peter, which was devastated by the 1998 Comfrey – St. Peter tornado outbreak.

== Casualties and damage ==
One person, a 90-year-old man, was killed when he was pinned by a tree while inside a home in Kasota. Thirty-seven people were reported to have had injuries from that tornado. Five others were injured in the remaining tornadoes on this day, and in all there was $44 million in damages.

== Confirmed tornadoes ==
Confirmed tornadoes by Fujita rating
FU	F0	F1	F2	F3	F4	F5	Total
0	7	1	3	3	0	0	14

List of confirmed tornadoes
F#	Location	County	Time (UTC)	Path length	Damage
North Dakota
F0	Hebron	Morton	1201	1 mile (1.6 km)	Small dusty tornado struck the south edge of town, tossing around small objects, lofting tree branches, and destroying an old garage. An outbuilding was also damaged, and a pickup truck was damaged by debris.
F2	SW of Underwood	McLean	1255	2 miles (3.2 km)	Tornado struck a farm, tearing an attached garage and much of the roof off of a farmhouse. A shop building, a wellhouse, and a garden shed on the property were also destroyed. Debris was scattered up to 1/2 mile away. Power lines were downed as well.
F0	S of Steele	Kidder	1403	1 mile (1.6 km)	Tornado remained over open country and caused no damage.
South Dakota
F1	NE of Onida	Sully	2140	5 miles (8 km)	Tornado caused significant damage to a farmstead and scattered hay bales. The ground in a harvested sunflower field was heavily scoured.
F3	SW of Eureka to SE of Hillsview	McPherson	2203	14 miles (23 km)	Tornado devastated multiple farms, destroying homes, barns, vehicles, farming equipment, and grain bins. Trees were defoliated and debarked, and a well-anchored mobile home was completely destroyed. Debris from some sites was found up to 3 miles away from where it originated. One person sustained minor injuries.
F0	N of Holabird	Hyde	2210	1 mile (1.6 km)	Weak tornado caused no damage.
F0	N of Highmore	Hyde	2235	1 mile (1.6 km)	Weak tornado caused no damage.
F2	W of Miller	Hand	2305	5 miles (8 km)	Several well-built homes were heavily damaged, and a few were moved slightly off of their foundations. A large barn was destroyed, and a vehicle was moved 20 feet. Significant tree damage also occurred.
F3	S of Vayland to SW of Huron	Hand, Beadle	2332	24.5 miles (39 km)	Large tornado. Near Vayland, several farmsteads were damaged. A mobile home was flipped and destroyed, a grain storage building was flipped onto a car, and several homes had significant roof and window damage. Numerous trees were snapped as well. Near Wessington, the tornado struck a farm and destroyed a house and several outbuildings. Five large metal high-tension truss towers were toppled in that area as well. Several farms near Wolsey were completely destroyed, and vehicles were thrown up to 50 feet away from where they originated. Some of the vehicles were badly mangled, and a pickup truck was partially wrapped around a tree. Trees were snapped and debarked, power lines were downed, livestock was killed, and a small highway bridge was severely damaged before the tornado dissipated near Huron. Overall, 8 homes were destroyed, and several others were damaged. Aerial survey revealed cycloidal scour marks in farm fields. Two people were injured.
F2	SE of Huron	Beadle	0018	7 miles (11 km)	Tornado severely damaged 3 houses and destroyed or damaged a barn and several smaller buildings on farmsteads. The tornado knocked down power poles, with a transformer on one of the poles starting a brief fire. A tree shelter belt and some crops were damaged as well.
F0	S of Huron	Beadle	0023	< 1 mile	Brief rope tornado caused only minor crop damage.
F0	SW of Esmond	Kingsbury	0056	< 1 mile	Brief tornado caused no damage.
Minnesota
F0	N of Searles	Brown	2208	.5 mile	Tornado blew two semi-trucks off of Highway-15, injuring both of the drivers. A machine shed was destroyed, and some barns and outbuildings sustained minor damage.
F3	Nicollet to NW of Waterville	Nicollet, Le Sueur	2230	33 miles (53 km)	1 death - Large, long-tracked, multiple-vortex tornado touched down in Nicollet and heavily damaged multiple homes, some of which were shifted from their foundations. One home in town lost much of its second story. The tornado rapidly intensified and completely leveled a house just south of St. Peter. Several farms in that area sustained major damage, along with a power substation. A total of 57 homes in Nicollet County were damaged, some of which were totaled. Vehicles were tossed and damaged as well. In Le Sueur County, the tornado clipped the north side of Kasota, where over 100 homes suffered some damage, dozens of homes had major damage, and three were completely leveled. One man was killed in that area when a tree crashed through his roof. A few homes were also destroyed at nearby Lake Emily. Several farms were impacted and hundreds of farm animals were killed further along the path before the tornado dissipated near Waterville. Farm fields were heavily scoured along much of the path, and approximately five thousand acres of corn and soybeans were ruined. 37 people were injured, some of them severely.
Sources: SPC Storm Reports 08/24, Aberdeen office, Sioux Falls office, Twin Cities office, NCDC Storm Event Database

== Non-tornadic events ==
A wider area, from Montana to Michigan was also affected by large hail storms throughout the day. Southern Minnesota was especially hard hit, with hail to 4.25 in (10.8 cm) diameter reported in New Prague, and $50 million in property damage sustained in and around Northfield. Two car dealerships in Northfield lost their entire inventory of vehicles. In Minnesota there was $125 million in hail damage reported.

== See also ==
- List of North American tornadoes and tornado outbreaks
- Tornadoes of 2006
