= St. Mary's Church, School and Convent =

Historic church in South Dakota, United States

- U.S. National Register of Historic Places
- Location within South Dakota Location within the United States
- Nearest city: Zell, South Dakota
- Area: 7 acres (2.8 ha)
- Built: 1910
- Architect: Stolte, Herman E.; Schwartz, Joseph
- NRHP reference No.: 82003928
- Added to NRHP: July 19, 1982

St. Mary's Church, School and Convent is a historic Roman Catholic church complex off United States Route 212 in Zell, South Dakota.

== Description ==
It consists of four buildings and a cemetery, located on 7 acres (2.8 ha) just south of Zell in Hand County. All four buildings (a church, convent, and two rectory houses) are wood-frame structures built between 1883 and 1910. The oldest building, the three-story convent school, was built in 1883, and is the mother site of the Benedictine Sisters in the state. It has a fire shoot attached to one of the upper floors to allowed escape in case of a fire. Most of the children spoke German and were taught English. The convent school served the community until 1963, when upgrades to comply with the fire code became cost prohibitive.

The church was designed by Joseph Schwartz, one of the first architects to live and work in the state, and was built in Victorian Gothic Revival style in 1905. The site is privately owned.

The complex was listed on the National Register of Historic Places in 1982.

== History ==
In 1874, five sisters from the monastery of Maria-Rickenbach in Switzerland, led by Mother Gertrud Leupi, came to Maryville, Missouri where Father Adelhelm Odermatt O.S.B. was engaged in parish work. Mother Gertrud established Sacred Heart Convent there. In 1883, Bishop Martin Marty, apostolic vicar of the Dakota Territory, asked the sisters for assistance in ministering to the people. The Maryville congregation moved to Zell, South Dakota and opened a school for children of the parish.

== Benedictine Sisters of Yankton ==
In 1889, St. Joseph's Convent was established in Yankton where the sisters had purchased an empty school building next door to the Bishop's residence.

In 1897, at the request of Bishop Thomas O'Gorman of Sioux Falls, the sisters opened Sacred Heart Hospital, which in 1998 became affiliated with the Presentation Health System. In 1938, at the request of Abbot Leonard Schwinn of Holy Cross Abbey in Cañon City, Colorado, the sisters took over management of the Fremont County Doctors' Hospital. In 1942 it was renamed Saint Thomas More Hospital. In 1994, the Benedictine Sisters turned St. Thomas More Hospital over to the Sisters of Charity of Cincinnati, Ohio.

In 2009, Mother Jerome Schmitt, OSB, (1899–1983) prioress of Sacred Heart Monastery and the founder and first president of Mount Marty College was named to the South Dakota Hall of Fame.

== See also ==
- National Register of Historic Places listings in Hand County, South Dakota
