= Thunderbird Colony, South Dakota =

- Census-designated place
- Location within South Dakota Location within the United States
- Coordinates: 45°11′28″N 99°16′03″W
- Country: United States
- State: South Dakota
- County: Faulk

Area
  - Total: 0.50 sq mi (1.30 km^{2})
  - Land: 0.47 sq mi (1.22 km^{2})
  - Water: 0.031 sq mi (0.08 km^{2})
- Elevation: 1,719 ft (524 m)

Population (2020)
  - Total: 7
  - Density: 14.9/sq mi (5.74/km^{2})
- Time zone: UTC-6 (Central (CST))
  - Summer (DST): UTC-5 (CDT)
- ZIP Code: 57438 (Faulkton)
- Area code: 605
- FIPS code: 46-63452
- GNIS feature ID: 2813023

Thunderbird Colony is a Hutterite colony and census-designated place (CDP) in Faulk County, South Dakota, United States. The population was 7 at the 2020 census. It was first listed as a CDP prior to the 2020 census.

It is in the northwest part of the county, on the north side of South Dakota Highway 20. It is 17 miles (27 km) by road northwest of Faulkton, the county seat, and less than 3 miles (5 km) west of Norbeck. Blumengard Colony is 9 miles (14 km) by road to the northeast, and Brentwood Colony is 5 miles (8 km) to the southwest.

== Demographics ==
Historical population
Census	Pop.	Note	%±
2020	7		—
U.S. Decennial Census
