= National Register of Historic Places listings in Hand County, South Dakota =

Location of Hand County in South Dakota

This is a list of the National Register of Historic Places listings in Hand County, South Dakota.

This is intended to be a complete list of the properties on the National Register of Historic Places in Hand County, South Dakota, United States. The locations of National Register properties for which the latitude and longitude coordinates are included below, may be seen in a map.

There are 8 properties listed on the National Register in the county.

This National Park Service list is complete through NPS recent listings posted March 14, 2025.

== Current listings ==
	Name on the Register	Image	Date listed	Location	City or town	Description
1	Archaeological Site 39HD115		September 11, 2023 (#100009315)	Address restricted	Ree Heights vicinity	
2	Archeological Site 39HD22		February 23, 1984 (#84003296)	Address restricted	Danforth	
3	Hand County Courthouse and Jail		March 17, 1994 (#94000193)	415 West First Avenue; 44°31′23″N 98°59′41″W	Miller	
4	Mack Jones House		November 19, 2007 (#07001211)	315 East Third Avenue; 44°31′15″N 98°59′02″W	Miller	
5	Port and Helen McWhorter House		July 31, 2017 (#100001400)	426 North Broadway; 44°31′14″N 98°59′18″W	Miller	Currently the Hand County Historic Society
6	Miller Ree Creek Bridge		August 25, 1988 (#88001314)	Western edge of Miller; 44°31′02″N 98°59′54″W	Miller	
7	St. Mary's Church, School and Convent		July 19, 1982 (#82003928)	U.S. Route 212; 44°53′44″N 98°43′41″W	Zell	
8	South Dakota Dept. of Transportation Bridge No. 30-257-400		December 9, 1993 (#93001293)	Local road over Sand Creek; 44°18′17″N 98°47′08″W	Miller	

== See also ==
- List of National Historic Landmarks in South Dakota
- National Register of Historic Places listings in South Dakota
