= Brentwood Colony, South Dakota =

- Census-designated place
- Location within South Dakota Location within the United States
- Coordinates: 45°09′05″N 99°17′54″W
- Country: United States
- State: South Dakota
- County: Faulk

Area
  - Total: 0.98 sq mi (2.54 km^{2})
  - Land: 0.87 sq mi (2.26 km^{2})
  - Water: 0.11 sq mi (0.28 km^{2})
- Elevation: 1,716 ft (523 m)

Population (2020)
  - Total: 116
  - Density: 133.2/sq mi (51.41/km^{2})
- Time zone: UTC-6 (Central (CST))
  - Summer (DST): UTC-5 (CDT)
- ZIP Code: 57438 (Faulkton)
- Area code: 605
- FIPS code: 46-07068
- GNIS feature ID: 2813024

Brentwood Colony is a Hutterite colony and census-designated place (CDP) in Faulk County, South Dakota, United States. The population was 116 at the 2020 census. It was first listed as a CDP prior to the 2020 census.

It is in the northwest part of the county, 17 miles (27 km) by road northwest of Faulkton, the county seat, and 8 miles (13 km) southwest of Norbeck. Thunderbird Colony is 5 miles (8 km) by road to the northeast.

== Demographics ==
Historical population
Census	Pop.	Note	%±
2020	116		—
U.S. Decennial Census
