= Blumengard Colony, South Dakota =

- Census-designated place
- Location within South Dakota Location within the United States
- Coordinates: 45°14′30″N 99°10′12″W
- Country: United States
- State: South Dakota
- County: Faulk

Area
  - Total: 0.23 sq mi (0.60 km^{2})
  - Land: 0.23 sq mi (0.60 km^{2})
  - Water: 0 sq mi (0.00 km^{2})
- Elevation: 1,614 ft (492 m)

Population (2020)
  - Total: 0
  - Density: 0/sq mi (0/km^{2})
- Time zone: UTC-6 (Central (CST))
  - Summer (DST): UTC-5 (CDT)
- ZIP Code: 57438 (Faulkton)
- Area code: 605
- FIPS code: 46-06140
- GNIS feature ID: 2813022

Blumengard Colony is a Hutterite colony and census-designated place (CDP) in Faulk County, South Dakota, United States. The population was 0 at the 2020 census. It was first listed as a CDP prior to the 2020 census.

It is on the northern edge of the county, bordered to the north by Edmunds County. It is 17 miles (27 km) north of Faulkton, the county seat, and 16 miles (26 km) northwest of Cresbard. Thunderbird Colony is 9 miles (14 km) by road to the southwest.

== Demographics ==
Historical population
Census	Pop.	Note	%±
2020	0		—
U.S. Decennial Census
