= Evergreen Colony, South Dakota =

- Census-designated place
- Location within South Dakota Location within the United States
- Coordinates: 45°07′18″N 99°02′33″W
- Country: United States
- State: South Dakota
- County: Faulk

Area
  - Total: 1.00 sq mi (2.58 km^{2})
  - Land: 1.00 sq mi (2.58 km^{2})
  - Water: 0 sq mi (0.00 km^{2})
- Elevation: 1,509 ft (460 m)

Population (2020)
  - Total: 111
  - Density: 111.3/sq mi (42.97/km^{2})
- Time zone: UTC-6 (Central (CST))
  - Summer (DST): UTC-5 (CDT)
- ZIP Code: 57438 (Faulkton)
- Area code: 605
- FIPS code: 46-20208
- GNIS feature ID: 2813025

Evergreen Colony is a Hutterite colony and census-designated place (CDP) in Faulk County, South Dakota, United States. The population was 111 at the 2020 census. It was first listed as a CDP prior to the 2020 census.

It is in the northeast part of the county, 13 miles (21 km) by road northeast of Faulkton, the county seat, and 7 miles (11 km) southwest of Cresbard.

== Demographics ==
Historical population
Census	Pop.	Note	%±
2020	111		—
U.S. Decennial Census
