= Wecota, South Dakota =

Unincorporated community in South Dakota, US

Coordinates: 45°10′21″N 99°07′03″W

Wecota is an unincorporated community in Faulk County, South Dakota, United States.

Wecota was founded in 1907 as a station stop on a branch line of the Minneapolis and St. Louis Railway built that year between Conde and LeBeau, South Dakota. Railway service to Wecota ended in 1940.

== Geography ==
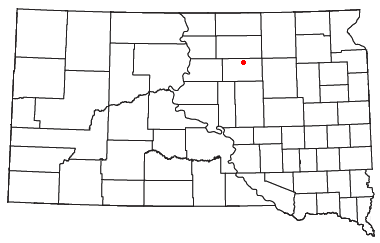
Location of Wecota, South Dakota

Wecota is located at Latitude: 45.1725 and Longitude: -99.11722. Elevation: 1558 ft.

Wecota has been assigned the ZIP code 57438 and the FIPS place code 46–69900. The local area code is 605.

The town has two streets, Main Street and Third Avenue. The town was platted with five streets and five avenues, but only Main Street and Third Avenue developed.

The post office opened April 10, 1907. Wecota is nine miles north of Faulkton, the county seat.

The name is thought to come from the Sioux language and mean friend.
