= Miller Ree Creek Bridge =

- U.S. National Register of Historic Places
- Location within South Dakota Location within the United States
- Location: W edge of Miller, Miller, South Dakota
- Coordinates: 44°31′2″N 98°59′54″W
- Area: less than one acre
- Built: 1914
- Built by: Iowa Bridge Company;
- Architect: James B. Marsh
- Architectural style: Marsh Rainbow Arch Bridge
- NRHP reference No.: 88001314
- Added to NRHP: August 25, 1988

The Miller Ree Creek Bridge is a historic bridge in Miller, South Dakota. It is a single-span Marsh rainbow arch concrete bridge, carrying 2nd Street over Ree Creek just west of the town. The bridge consists of two concrete arches, from which the floor supports are suspended. The bridge is 42 feet (13 m) long and 22 feet (6.7 m) wide, rising about 10 feet (3.0 m) above the stream bed. Built in 1914, this bridge is one of only three bridges of the type to survive in the state, and is the best-preserved of the three.

The bridge was listed on the National Register of Historic Places in 1988.

== See also ==
- National Register of Historic Places listings in Hand County, South Dakota
- List of bridges on the National Register of Historic Places in South Dakota
