= Robert N. Duxbury =

American politician

Member of the South Dakota Senate from the 18th, 22nd district
- In office 1981–1982
- In office 1999–2004

Member of the South Dakota House of Representatives from the 5th district
- In office 1985–1998

Personal details
- Born: March 14, 1934 Hand County, South Dakota
- Died: June 6, 2016 (aged 82) Wessington, South Dakota
- Party: Democratic
- Spouse: Rose Radcliffe
- Children: 5
- Profession: Farmer

Robert Neil Duxbury (March 14, 1934 – June 6, 2016) was an American politician in the state of South Dakota. A member of the Democratic Party, Duxbury was a member of the South Dakota House of Representatives and South Dakota State Senate. He served as minority leader of the House from 1987 to 1994. A farmer and educator, Duxbury attended South Dakota State University and earned a Bachelor of Arts. He served as the South Dakota Secretary of Agriculture from 1973 to 1978. He died on June 16, 2016.
