= South Dakota Dept. of Transportation Bridge No. 30-257-400 =

- U.S. National Register of Historic Places
- Location within South Dakota Location within the United States
- Nearest city: Miller, South Dakota
- Coordinates: 44°18′17″N 98°47′8″W
- Area: less than one acre
- Built: 1917
- Built by: Minneapolis Steel & Mach.; Hand County
- Architectural style: Stringer bridge
- MPS: Historic Bridges in South Dakota MPS
- NRHP reference No.: 93001293
- Added to NRHP: December 9, 1993

The South Dakota Dept. of Transportation Bridge No. 30-257-400 is a historic bridge in rural Hand County, South Dakota. It is located 14 miles (23 km) south of Miller and 9.7 miles (15.6 km) east, and carries a local road over Sand Creek. The bridge is a single-span steel beam stringer bridge, resting on I-beam pile abutments with concrete wings. The bridge is 26 feet (7.9 m) long. Built in 1917, it was one of the first bridges built in the county by county employees, rather than by hired bridge companies, and predates the formation of state highway department by two years.

The bridge was listed on the National Register of Historic Places in 1993.

== See also ==
- National Register of Historic Places listings in Hand County, South Dakota
- List of bridges on the National Register of Historic Places in South Dakota
