= C. W. Parker Carousel No. 825 =

- C.W. Parker Carousel No. 825
- U.S. National Register of Historic Places
- Location within South Dakota Location within the United States
- Location: 109 9th Avenue South, Faulkton, South Dakota
- Coordinates: 45°02′02″N 99°07′32″W
- NRHP reference No.: 100001399
- Added to NRHP: July 31, 2017

C.W. Parker Carousel No. 825 is a carousel built c. 1950, which was listed on the National Register of Historic Places in 2017. It is located at 109 9th Ave. S. in Faulkton in Faulk County, South Dakota.

It has also been known as Happy Times Carousel.

== See also ==
- Amusement rides on the National Register of Historic Places
- C. W. Parker
