= Norbeck =

Norbeck may refer to:

- Norbeck, Maryland
- Norbeck, South Dakota
- Peter Norbeck, a politician from South Dakota
