= Burkmere, South Dakota =

Unincorporated community in South Dakota, U.S.

Coordinates: 45°02′55″N 99°18′42″W

Burkmere is an unincorporated community in Faulk County, in the U.S. state of South Dakota.

== History ==
Burkmere was laid out in 1886 or 1887. The community was named for John M. Burke, a railroad official. A post office operated under the name Burkmere from 1889 until 1951.
