= Sievers School =

- U.S. National Register of Historic Places
- Location within South Dakota Location within the United States
- Location: NE. corner of 362nd Ave. & 170th St., Rockham, South Dakota
- Coordinates: 44°55′34″N 98°56′25″W
- NRHP reference No.: 14000031
- Added to NRHP: February 25, 2014

Sievers School is a historic rural schoolhouse in Faulk County, South Dakota. It was listed on the National Register of Historic Places in 2014.
