= Gov. Frank M. Byrne House =

Historic house in South Dakota, United States

- U.S. National Register of Historic Places
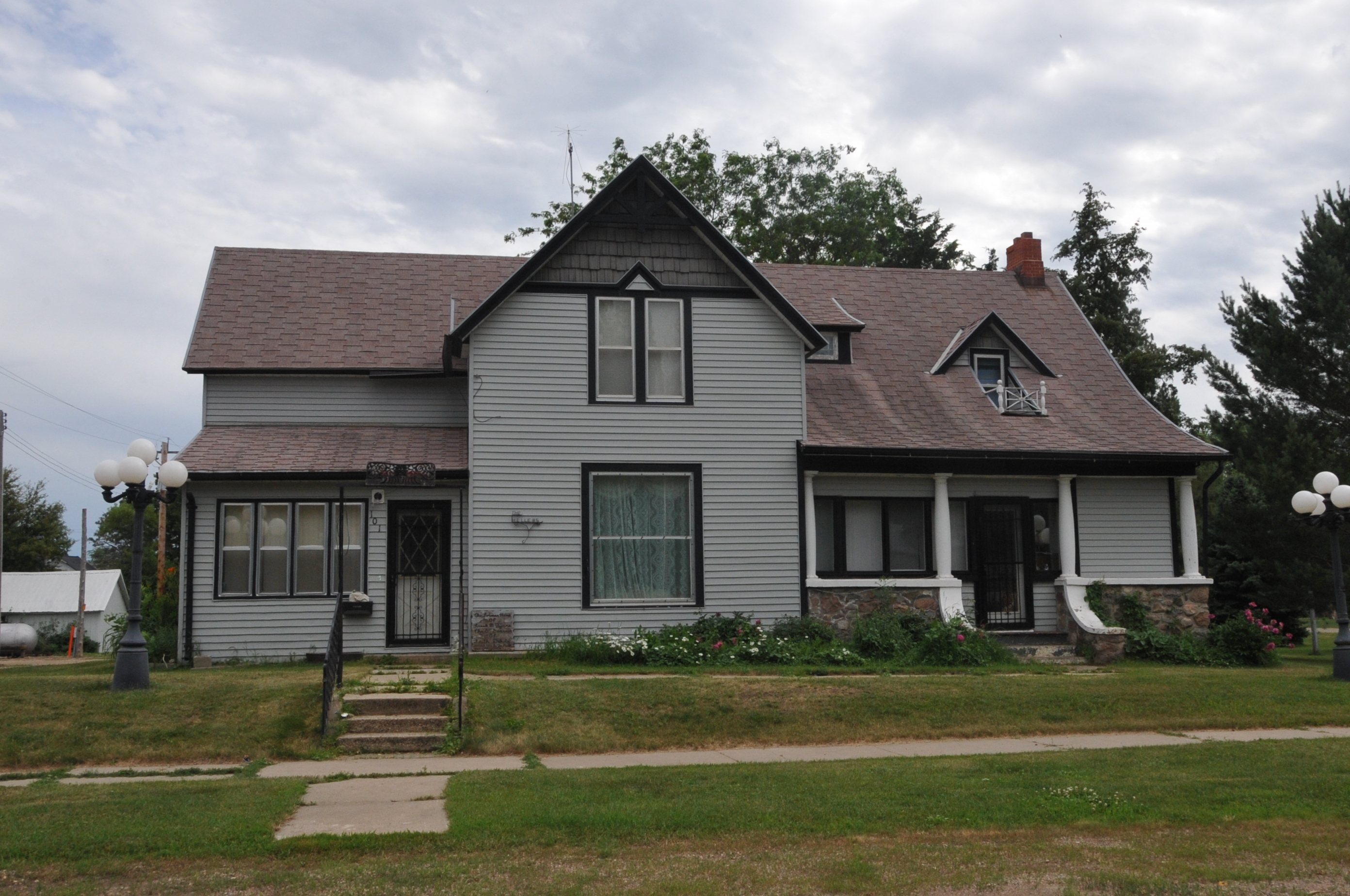

- Location within South Dakota Location within the United States
- Location: 1017 St. John St., Faulkton, South Dakota
- Coordinates: 45°1′58″N 99°7′40″W
- Area: less than one acre
- Built: c.1898, 1904, 1917
- Built by: Dodds, William J.; Jones, W. Forest
- Architectural style: Bungalow/craftsman, Stick/eastlake
- NRHP reference No.: 91002044
- Added to NRHP: January 30, 1992

The Gov. Frank M. Byrne House in Faulkton, South Dakota was built in about 1898 and was remodeled in 1904 and 1917. It was listed on the National Register of Historic Places in 1992.

It was a home of South Dakota governor Frank M. Byrne during c.1901 to 1923, including during the four years he was in office as governor.

The original building was a late example of Stick Style architecture; the later renovations added Craftsman influences.
