= Artesian, South Dakota =

- Town
- Location in Sanborn County and the state of South Dakota
- Coordinates: 44°00′28″N 97°55′25″W
- Country: United States
- State: South Dakota
- County: Sanborn
- Incorporated: 1914

Area
  - Total: 0.55 sq mi (1.43 km^{2})
  - Land: 0.55 sq mi (1.43 km^{2})
  - Water: 0 sq mi (0.00 km^{2})
- Elevation: 1,316 ft (401 m)

Population (2020)
  - Total: 129
  - Density: 232.9/sq mi (89.92/km^{2})
- Time zone: UTC-6 (Central (CST))
  - Summer (DST): UTC-5 (CDT)
- ZIP code: 57314
- Area code: 605
- FIPS code: 46-02380
- GNIS feature ID: 1267270
- Website: http://www.artesiansd.com/

Artesian is a town in Sanborn County, South Dakota, United States. The population was 129 at the 2020 census.

== History ==
When the first settlement at Artesian was made in 1883, it was called "Diana". A post office called Diana was established in 1883, the name was changed to Denton, and then to Artesian City in 1887, and again to Artesian in 1889. The present name is for the artesian aquifer and artesian wells near the original town site.

== Geography ==
According to the United States Census Bureau, the town has a total area of 0.55 square miles (1.42 km^{2}), all land.

== Demographics ==
Historical population
Census	Pop.	Note	%±
1890	256		—
1900	339		32.4%
1910	583		72.0%
1920	689		18.2%
1930	556		−19.3%
1940	502		−9.7%
1950	429		−14.5%
1960	330		−23.1%
1970	277		−16.1%
1980	227		−18.1%
1990	217		−4.4%
2000	157		−27.6%
2010	138		−12.1%
2020	129		−6.5%
U.S. Decennial Census

=== 2010 census ===
As of the census of 2010, there were 138 people, 73 households, and 42 families residing in the town. The population density was 250.9 inhabitants per square mile (96.9/km^{2}). There were 96 housing units at an average density of 174.5 per square mile (67.4/km^{2}). The racial makeup of the town was 89.9% White, 0.7% Asian, 3.6% from other races, and 5.8% from two or more races. Hispanic or Latino of any race were 5.8% of the population.

There were 73 households, of which 19.2% had children under the age of 18 living with them, 39.7% were married couples living together, 11.0% had a female householder with no husband present, 6.8% had a male householder with no wife present, and 42.5% were non-families. 41.1% of all households were made up of individuals, and 23.3% had someone living alone who was 65 years of age or older. The average household size was 1.89 and the average family size was 2.45.

The median age in the town was 47 years. 14.5% of residents were under the age of 18; 7.9% were between the ages of 18 and 24; 23.1% were from 25 to 44; 34.1% were from 45 to 64; and 20.3% were 65 years of age or older. The gender makeup of the town was 52.2% male and 47.8% female.

=== 2000 census ===
As of the census of 2000, there were 157 people, 70 households, and 42 families residing in the town. The population density was 285.7 inhabitants per square mile (110.3/km^{2}). There were 99 housing units at an average density of 180.2 per square mile (69.6/km^{2}). The racial makeup of the town was 100% White. Five of the people in the town call themselves Hispanic or Latino.

There were 70 households, out of which 24.3% had children under the age of 18 living with them, 54.3% were married couples living together, 2.9% had a female householder with no husband present, and 38.6% were non-families. 34.3% of all households were made up of individuals, and 15.7% had someone living alone who was 65 years of age or older. The average household size was 2.24 and the average family size was 2.93.

In the town, the population was spread out, with 19.7% under the age of 18, 8.9% from 18 to 24, 24.2% from 25 to 44, 24.2% from 45 to 64, and 22.9% who were 65 years of age or older. The median age was 43 years. For every 100 females, there were 121.1 males. For every 100 females age 18 and over, there were 117.2 males.

The median income for a household in the town was $36,875, and the median income for a family was $43,750. Males had a median income of $22,500 versus $23,125 for females. The per capita income for the town was $15,392. None of the families and 5.6% of the population were living below the poverty line, including no under eighteens and 27.3% of those over 64.
