= Maj. John A. Pickler Homestead =

Historic house in South Dakota, United States

- U.S. National Register of Historic Places
- Location within South Dakota Location within the United States
- Location: Southern edge of Faulkton city limits, Faulkton, South Dakota
- Coordinates: 45°01′38″N 99°07′28″W
- Area: 8 acres (3.2 ha)
- Built: 1882
- NRHP reference No.: 73001742
- Added to NRHP: April 11, 1973

The Maj. John A. Pickler Homestead, also known as the Pickler Project, is a historic house. It was listed on the National Register of Historic Places in 1973. It located on the south edge of the city of Faulkton, South Dakota.

It was home of Major Pickler, an influential person in the transition of South Dakota from territory to statehood in 1889. He served in the territorial legislature and was appointed and elected to four terms of the U.S. Congress. Alice Pickler was involved in the Women's Suffrage movement.

The home was visited by Theodore Roosevelt, Susan B. Anthony, and distinguished others.
