= John Pickler =

American politician (1844–1910)

Member of the U.S. House of Representatives from South Dakota's at-large district
- In office November 2, 1889 – March 3, 1897
- Preceded by: District created
- Succeeded by: John Edward Kelley

Personal details
- Born: January 24, 1844 Salem, Indiana, U.S.
- Died: June 13, 1910 (aged 66) Faulkton, South Dakota, U.S.
- Resting place: Faulkton Cemetery, Faulkton, South Dakota, U.S.
- Party: Republican
- Spouse: Alice Alt Pickler
- Education: University of Iowa; University of Michigan
- Occupation: Attorney

Military service
- Allegiance: United States
- Branch/service: Union Army
- Years of service: 1862–1865
- Rank: Major
- Unit: 3rd Iowa Cavalry Regiment
- Battles/wars: American Civil War

John Alfred Pickler (January 24, 1844 - June 13, 1910) was an American politician. He served as a member of the United States House of Representatives.

== Biography ==
John Alfred Pickler was born in Salem, Indiana, and moved to Davis County, Iowa, in his youth. He attended public schools in Davis and enlisted in the 3rd Iowa Cavalry Regiment during the American Civil War. He was promoted to the rank of major by the end of the war.

He graduated from the University of Iowa in 1870, attended the Old University of Chicago Law School in 1871 and graduated from the law school at the University of Michigan in 1872. He was admitted to the bar in 1872 and began practicing law in Kirksville, Missouri.

The Maj. John A. Pickler Homestead is on the National Register of Historic Places.

== Career ==
Pickler was a Republican politician. He was elected district attorney of Adair County, Missouri, in 1872. He moved to Muscatine, Iowa, and served in the Iowa House of Representatives from 1882 to 1884. He moved to the Dakota Territory and served in the territorial legislature between 1885 and 1886. While serving in the Dakota Legislature, he played a key role in introducing the territory's first bill to give women the right to vote.

After South Dakota was admitted as a state, he was elected as a Republican to Seat A, one of South Dakota's at-large seats in the United States House of Representatives. He was reelected in 1890, 1892, and 1894, and served from November 2, 1889, to March 3, 1897. Pickler and his wife, Alice Alt Pickler, worked for women's suffrage in the state. In his final term he was chairman of the Committee on Invalid Pensions. He chose not to run for re-election in 1896.

After leaving Congress, Pickler resumed the practice of law, and also became active in the real estate business.

== Death ==
Pickler died on June 13, 1910, in Faulkton, South Dakota, at the age of sixty-six. He is interred at Faulkton Cemetery in Faulkton.

U.S. House of Representatives
Preceded by District created	Member of the U.S. House of Representatives from South Dakota's at-large congressional district November 2, 1889 – March 3, 1897	Succeeded by John Edward Kelley
