= Frank and Clara Turner House =

Historic house in South Dakota, United States

- U.S. National Register of Historic Places
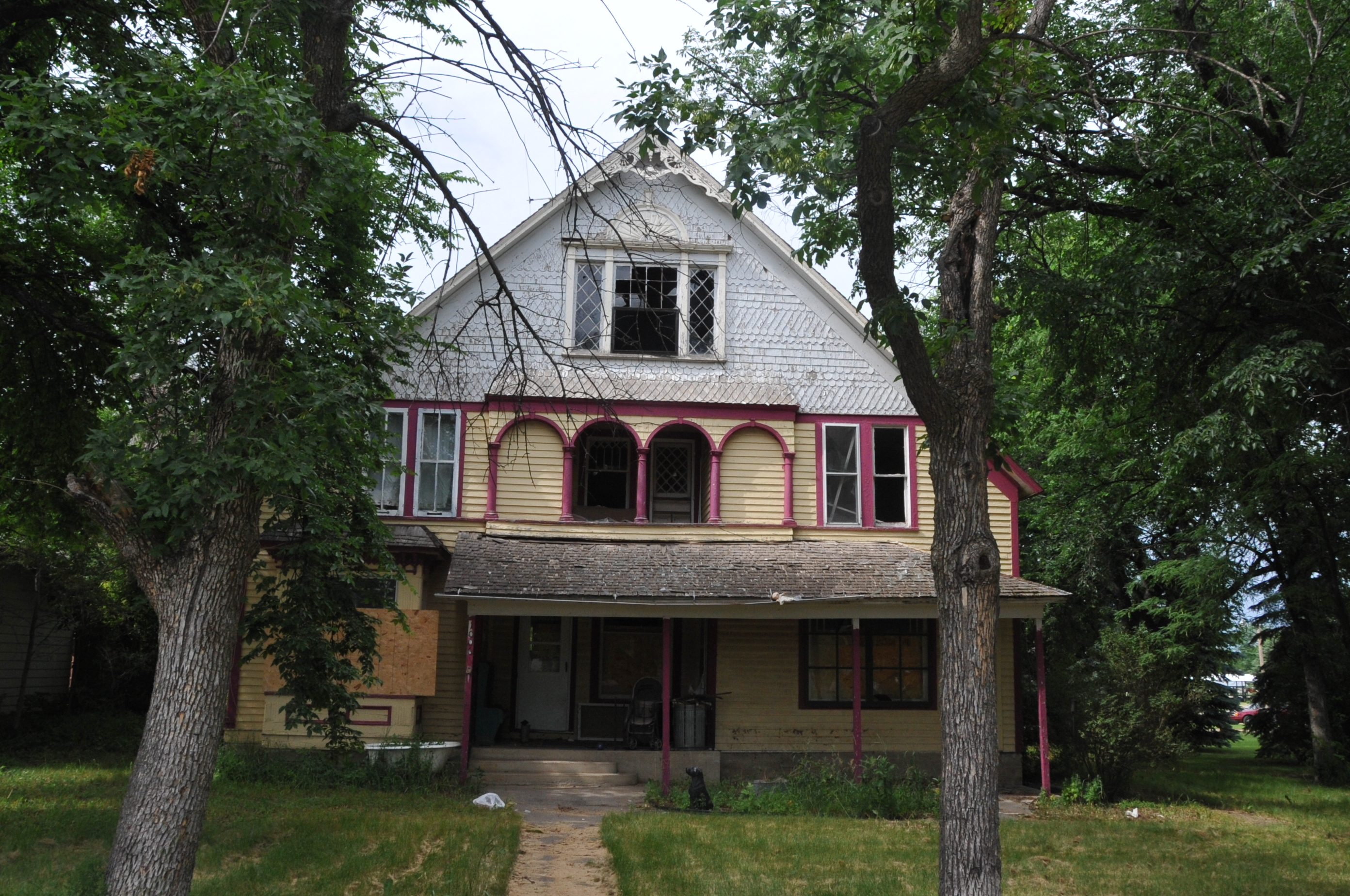
- House in 2013

- Location within South Dakota Location within the United States
- Location: 1006 Main, Faulkton, South Dakota
- Coordinates: 45°02′08″N 99°08′00″W
- Area: less than one acre
- Built: c. 1888, 1897, 1905-06, 1934
- Built by: Forest Jones, William Dodds
- Architectural style: Queen Anne
- NRHP reference No.: 86000245
- Added to NRHP: February 13, 1986

The Frank and Clara Turner House, at 1006 Main in Faulkton, South Dakota, is a Queen Anne style house built in 1897. It was listed on the National Register of Historic Places in 1986.

It was built before 1889, remodeled and enlarged in 1897, and remodeled in 1905-6 and again in 1934. It has also been known as the Eyler House.
