= Port and Helen McWhorter House =

Historic house in South Dakota, United States

- U.S. National Register of Historic Places
- Location within South Dakota Location within the United States
- Location: 426 N. Broadway, Miller, South Dakota
- Coordinates: 44°31′14″N 99°59′18″W
- Architectural style: Queen Anne
- NRHP reference No.: 100001400
- Added to NRHP: July 31, 2017

The Port and Helen McWhorter House, located at 426 N. Broadway in Miller in Hand County, South Dakota, was built in 1906. It was listed on the National Register of Historic Places in 2017.

It is a two-story, wood-frame, Queen Anne style house which was built for Dr. Port and Helen McWhorter. The first floor was used for medical offices and the upper floor as a residence. It was used as a public school dormitory around 1938, and it became a museum in 1989. It was deemed notable "for its association with the health/medical history of Miller" and "as an excellent local example of early twentieth century Queen Anne (cross gable, free classic) architecture. "

It is a museum of the Hand County Historic Society.

For a time, during the 1950s and 1960s, it was the home of a notable district science teacher Donald Henrickson, his wife Inez, and his daughters Beverly, Marlys, and Sharon. Beverly has recently donated a high chair that was part of the girls' childhood in that home.
