= Miller Township, Hand County, South Dakota =

Township in Hand County, South Dakota

Coordinates: 44°30′07″N 99°00′15″W

Miller Township is a township in Hand County, in the U.S. state of South Dakota.

== History ==
Miller Township was named for Henry Miller, an early settler.
