= Alden Township, Hand County, South Dakota =

Alden Township
- Township
- Location in South Dakota Location in the United States
- Coordinates: 44°40′16″N 99°7′11″W
- Country: United States
- State: South Dakota
- County: Hand County

Area
  - Total: 35.57 sq mi (92.1 km^{2})
  - Land: 35.56 sq mi (92.1 km^{2})
  - Water: 0.01 sq mi (0.026 km^{2})
- Elevation: 1,588 ft (484 m)

Population (2000)
  - Total: 27
  - Density: 0.9/sq mi (0.35/km^{2})
- Time zone: UTC-6 (Central (CST))
  - Summer (DST): UTC-5 (CDT)
- Area code: 605
- FIPS code: 46-059-00780
- GNIS feature ID: 1268917

Alden Township is a rural township in Hand County, South Dakota, United States. The population was 27 at the 2020 census. The population was 33 at the 2000 census.

== Geography ==
Alden is located in survey township 114N Range 69W in the northwestern part of Hand County. The township covers 36.38 square miles (94.2 km^{2}), all land. Lost Creek, a minor tributary of the James River, flows through the central part of the township.

== Demographics ==
As of the census of 2000, there were 33 people, 11 households, and 10 families residing in the township. The population density was 0.9 people per square mile (0.35 people/km^{2}). There were 15 housing units at an average density of 0.4 per square mile (0.15/km^{2}). The racial makeup of the township was 100.00% White.

There were 11 households, out of which 45.5% had children under the age of 18 living with them, 81.8% were married couples living together, 9.1% had a female householder with no husband present, 9.1% were non-families, and 36.4% had someone over the age of 65 in the household. The average household size was 3 and the average family size was 3.2.

In the township the population was spread out, with 36.4% under the age of 18, 3.0% from 18 to 24, 30.3% from 25 to 44, 15.2% from 45 to 64, and 15.2% who were 65 years of age or older. The median age was 38 years. For every 100 females, there were 83.3 males. For every 100 females age 18 and over, there were 90.9 males.

The median income for a household in the township was $116,860, and the median income for a family was more than $200,000. Males had a median income of more than $100,000 versus $0 for females. The per capita income for the township was $74,845. There were no families and none of the population living below the poverty line. Only 2 households reported incomes less than $25,000.
