= Gertrud Leupi =

Swiss Benedictine nun and founder of a monastery (1825 – 1904)

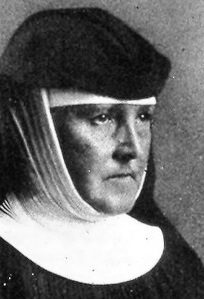
Sister Gertrud Leupi OSB before 1900

Gertrud Leupi OSB, (1 March 1825 – 26 March 1904) was a Swiss Benedictine and founder of monasteries. She founded the Maria Rickenbach Monastery, Switzerland, the Yankton Benedictine, South Dakota, and the Marienburg monastery, Wikon, Switzerland.

== Life ==
Gertrud Leupi was born in a farming family on 1 March 1825 in Wikon, Switzerland. In 1846 her family moved to Lucerne. In 1848 she entered the Baldegg Monastery and made her first vows in 1950. After completing her teacher's training, she taught in the Cistercian monastery in Frauenthal and the Engelberg Abbey.

In 1857 she left the Baldegger Sisters and, with others, founded the Maria Rickenbach monastery in Niederrickenbach, which practiced perpetual adoration. She became the superior of the Maria Rickenbach monastery in 1858 and remained in that office for 25 years.

In 1873, a request to send nuns to perform various tasks including teaching in the founding of Benedictines affiliates in the United States was made to the Maria Rickenbach monastery. In responding to this call for service, Leupi showed interest to travel across the Atlantic. She arrived in Maryville, Missouri from Switzerland on 1 November 1880 and served for more than 10 years.

Between 1883 and 1887, along with other sisters, Leupi established a mother house in Zell, South Dakota to support their missionary activities. In 1887, Martin Marty, Catholic bishop, encouraged Leupi and other nuns to work in Yankton, South Dakota where the Sacred Heart Monastery was established. She made important contributions in educating girls from the Sioux tribe.

On her return to Wikon, Switzerland in 1891, she bought a castle with the help of her nephew pastor Josef Leupi, where she founded the Marienburg monastery. She continued the educational and missionary activities. Gertrud Leupi died in Wikon, Switzerland, on 26 March 1904.
