= Judith Evelyn =

American actress (1909–1967)

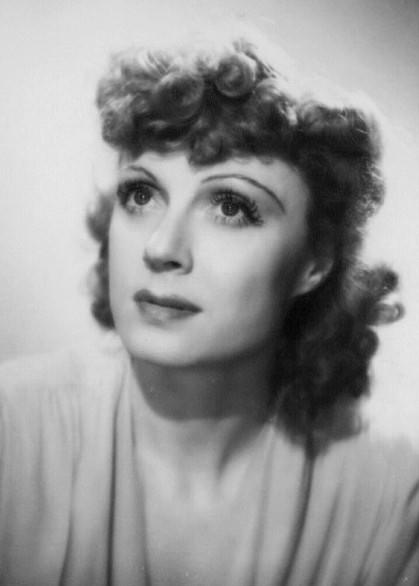
- Evelyn in 1941
- Born: Evelyn Morris; March 20, 1909; Seneca, South Dakota, U.S.
- Died: May 7, 1967 (aged 58); New York City, U.S.
- Resting place: Kensico Cemetery, Valhalla, New York
- Occupation: Actress
- Years active: 1932–1962

Judith Evelyn (born Evelyn Morris; March 20, 1909 – May 7, 1967) was an American-born Canadian stage and film actress who appeared in around 50 films and television series.

== Early years ==
Evelyn was born Evelyn Morris in 1909 (later shaving four years off of her age) in Seneca, South Dakota, United States and raised in Winnipeg, Manitoba. Her step-father was a successful stage actor. She attended the University of Manitoba, where she was active in drama, and she developed her acting skills at Hart House, University of Toronto.

== Career ==
Evelyn worked on radio both for the British Broadcasting Corporation and for the Canadian Broadcasting Corporation. Her early stage experience included being a member of a Canadian Chautauqua unit in 1932. The next year, she performed with the Pasadena Community Playhouse in California.

Evelyn appeared on Broadway in the following plays:

- The Shrike as Ann Downs (January 15, 1952 – May 31, 1952)
- Craig's Wife (February 12, 1947 – April 12, 1947) (revival)
- The Rich Full Life (November 9, 1945 – December 1, 1945)
- Angel Street as Bella Manningham (December 5, 1941 – December 30, 1944)

All four of the plays were made into films, but Evelyn did not appear in any of them. She did appear in other films, including the role as Miss Lonelyhearts, the lonely alcoholic in Alfred Hitchcock's Rear Window. In 1956, Evelyn played the role of Nancy Lynnton in George Stevens' Giant. She had a brief performance as Queen Mother Taia in Michael Curtiz's The Egyptian and was featured with Vincent Price in The Tingler (1959), her last film role. On television, among other roles, she played Clara Keller in the 1958 episode "Man in the Moon" of the docudrama Behind Closed Doors and appeared in two episodes of the Western series Tales of Wells Fargo. Her last credited role was as Mrs. Bullock in the episode "Cry a Little for Mary Too" of The Eleventh Hour (1962).

== Professional awards ==
In 1942, Evelyn won the Distinguished Performance Award from The Drama League for her performance in Angel Street, an award that is "bestowed each season on a single performer from over sixty nominated performances from Broadway and Off-Broadway."

== Personal life and death ==
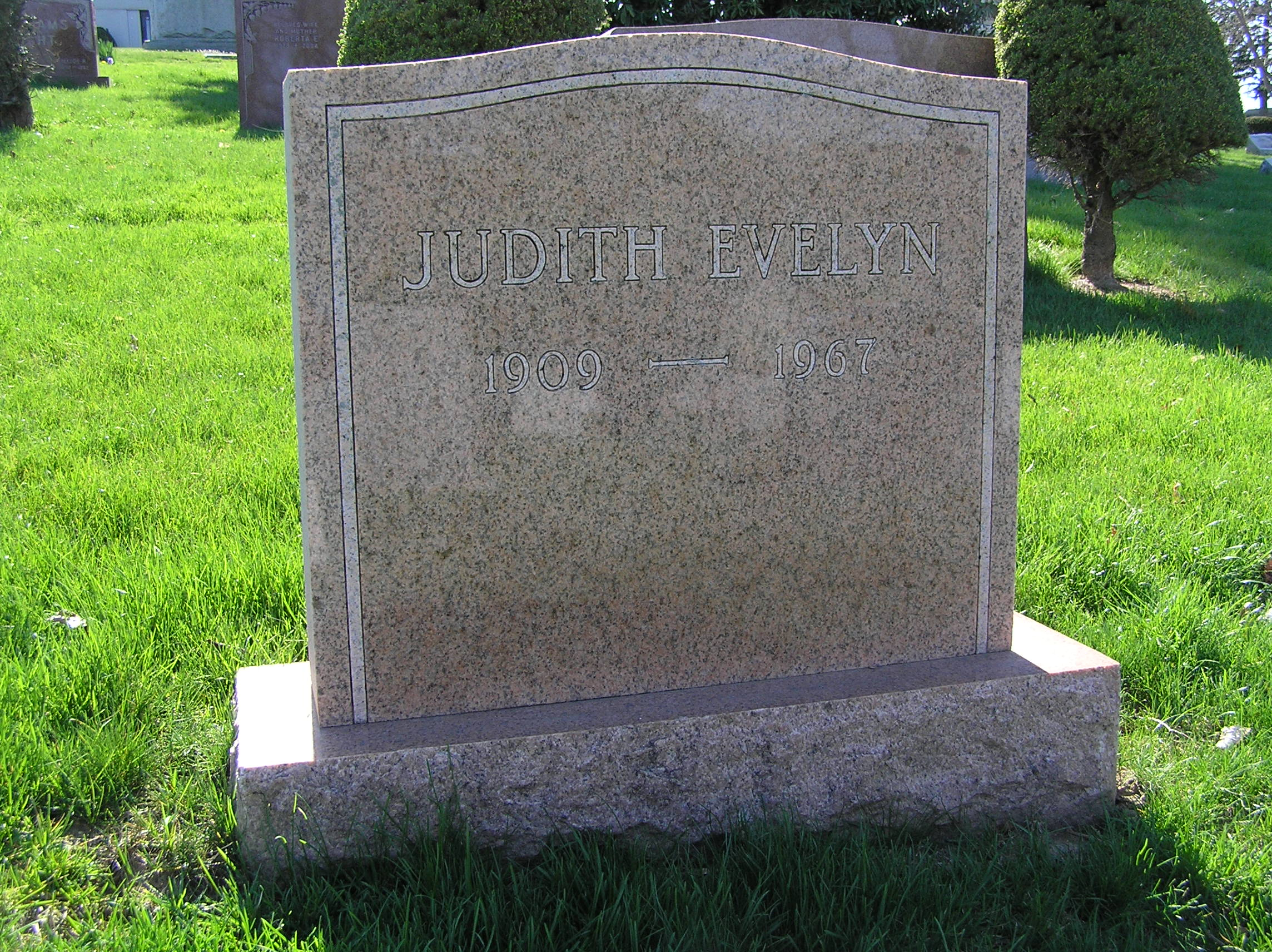
Evelyn's gravesite in New York

On September 3, 1939, Evelyn and her then-fiancé, Canadian radio producer Andrew Allan (the two never married), survived the sinking of the Anchor-Donaldson liner SS Athenia. The Athenia was the first British passenger liner to be torpedoed and sunk by a German submarine in World War II. Mr. Allan's elderly father died in the aftermath of the disaster, when the lifeboat the three of them were in was accidentally sunk by a rescue ship.

Evelyn died from pancreatic cancer in New York City on May 7, 1967, at the age of 58. She is interred at Kensico Cemetery in Valhalla, New York.

== Filmography ==
Film
Year	Title	Role	Notes
1951	The 13th Letter	Sister Marie Corbin	
1954	Rear Window	Miss Lonelyhearts	
1954	The Egyptian	Taia	
1955	Alfred Hitchcock Presents	Amelia Verber	Season 1 Episode 11: "Guilty Witness"
1955	Female on the Beach	Eloise Crandall	
1956	Hilda Crane	Mrs. Stella Crane	
1956	Giant	Mrs. Nancy Lynnton	
1957	Alfred Hitchcock Presents	Mable McKay	Season 2 Episode 34: "Martha Mason, Movie Star"
1958	The Brothers Karamazov	Madame Anna Hohlakov	
1958	Twilight for the Gods	Ethel Peacock	
1959	The Tingler	Mrs. Martha Ryerson Higgins	
