= Millerdale Colony, South Dakota =

- Census-designated place
- Location within South Dakota Location within the United States
- Coordinates: 44°23′56″N 99°06′39″W
- Country: United States
- State: South Dakota
- County: Hand

Area
  - Total: 0.26 sq mi (0.68 km^{2})
  - Land: 0.25 sq mi (0.66 km^{2})
  - Water: 0.0077 sq mi (0.02 km^{2})
- Elevation: 1,919 ft (585 m)

Population (2020)
  - Total: 129
  - Density: 502.9/sq mi (194.16/km^{2})
- Time zone: UTC-6 (Central (CST))
  - Summer (DST): UTC-5 (CDT)
- ZIP Code: 57362 (Miller)
- Area code: 605
- FIPS code: 46-42579
- GNIS feature ID: 2813028

Millerdale Colony is a Hutterite colony and census-designated place (CDP) in Hand County, South Dakota, United States. It was first listed as a CDP prior to the 2020 census. As of the 2020 census, Millerdale Colony had a population of 129.

It is in the southwest part of the county, 14 miles (23 km) by road southwest of Miller, the county seat.

== Demographics ==
Historical population
Census	Pop.	Note	%±
2020	129		—
U.S. Decennial Census
