= Seneca, South Dakota =

- Town
- Location in Faulk County and the state of South Dakota
- Coordinates: 45°03′39″N 99°30′33″W
- Country: United States
- State: South Dakota
- County: Faulk

Area
  - Total: 0.42 sq mi (1.08 km^{2})
  - Land: 0.42 sq mi (1.08 km^{2})
  - Water: 0 sq mi (0.00 km^{2})
- Elevation: 1,906 ft (581 m)

Population (2020)
  - Total: 22
  - Density: 52.5/sq mi (20.28/km^{2})
- Time zone: UTC-6 (Central (CST))
  - Summer (DST): UTC-5 (CDT)
- ZIP code: 57473
- Area code: 605
- FIPS code: 46-58180
- GNIS feature ID: 1267563

Seneca is a town in Faulk County, South Dakota, United States. The population was 22 at the 2020 census.

== History ==
A post office has been in operation at Seneca since 1886. Seneca was laid out in 1887. The town was named after Seneca Falls, New York.

== Geography ==
According to the United States Census Bureau, the town has a total area of 0.42 square miles (1.09 km^{2}), all land.

Seneca is along U.S. Route 212.

== Demographics ==
Historical population
Census	Pop.	Note	%±
1910	321		—
1920	264		−17.8%
1930	318		20.5%
1940	243		−23.6%
1950	204		−16.0%
1960	161		−21.1%
1970	118		−26.7%
1980	103		−12.7%
1990	81		−21.4%
2000	58		−28.4%
2010	38		−34.5%
2020	22		−42.1%
U.S. Decennial Census

=== 2010 census ===
As of the census of 2010, there were 38 people, 16 households, and 11 families residing in the town. The population density was 90.5 inhabitants per square mile (34.9/km^{2}). There were 29 housing units at an average density of 69.0 per square mile (26.6/km^{2}). The racial makeup of the town was 97.4% White and 2.6% Asian. Hispanic or Latino of any race were 13.2% of the population.

There were 16 households, of which 31.3% had children under the age of 18 living with them, 68.8% were married couples living together, and 31.3% were non-families. 31.3% of all households were made up of individuals, and 18.8% had someone living alone who was 65 years of age or older. The average household size was 2.38 and the average family size was 3.00.

The median age in the town was 48 years. 23.7% of residents were under the age of 18; 2.6% were between the ages of 18 and 24; 13.1% were from 25 to 44; 39.5% were from 45 to 64; and 21.1% were 65 years of age or older. The gender makeup of the town was 52.6% male and 47.4% female.

=== 2000 census ===
As of the census of 2000, there were 58 people, 28 households, and 14 families residing in the town. The population density was 141.0 inhabitants per square mile (54.4/km^{2}). There were 36 housing units at an average density of 87.5 per square mile (33.8/km^{2}). The racial makeup of the town was 98.28% White and 1.72% Native American.

There were 28 households, out of which 17.9% had children under the age of 18 living with them, 42.9% were married couples living together, 3.6% had a female householder with no husband present, and 50.0% were non-families. 46.4% of all households were made up of individuals, and 25.0% had someone living alone who was 65 years of age or older. The average household size was 2.07 and the average family size was 3.00.

In the town, the population was spread out, with 20.7% under the age of 18, 8.6% from 18 to 24, 13.8% from 25 to 44, 22.4% from 45 to 64, and 34.5% who were 65 years of age or older. The median age was 50 years. For every 100 females, there were 107.1 males. For every 100 females age 18 and over, there were 91.7 males.

The median income for a household in the town was $18,750, and the median income for a family was $23,750. Males had a median income of $25,833 versus $17,500 for females. The per capita income for the town was $10,642. There were 25.0% of families and 20.0% of the population living below the poverty line, including no under eighteens and 16.0% of those over 64.

== Notable person ==
Judith Evelyn, an American actress, was born in Seneca.
