= John Edward Kelley =

American politician

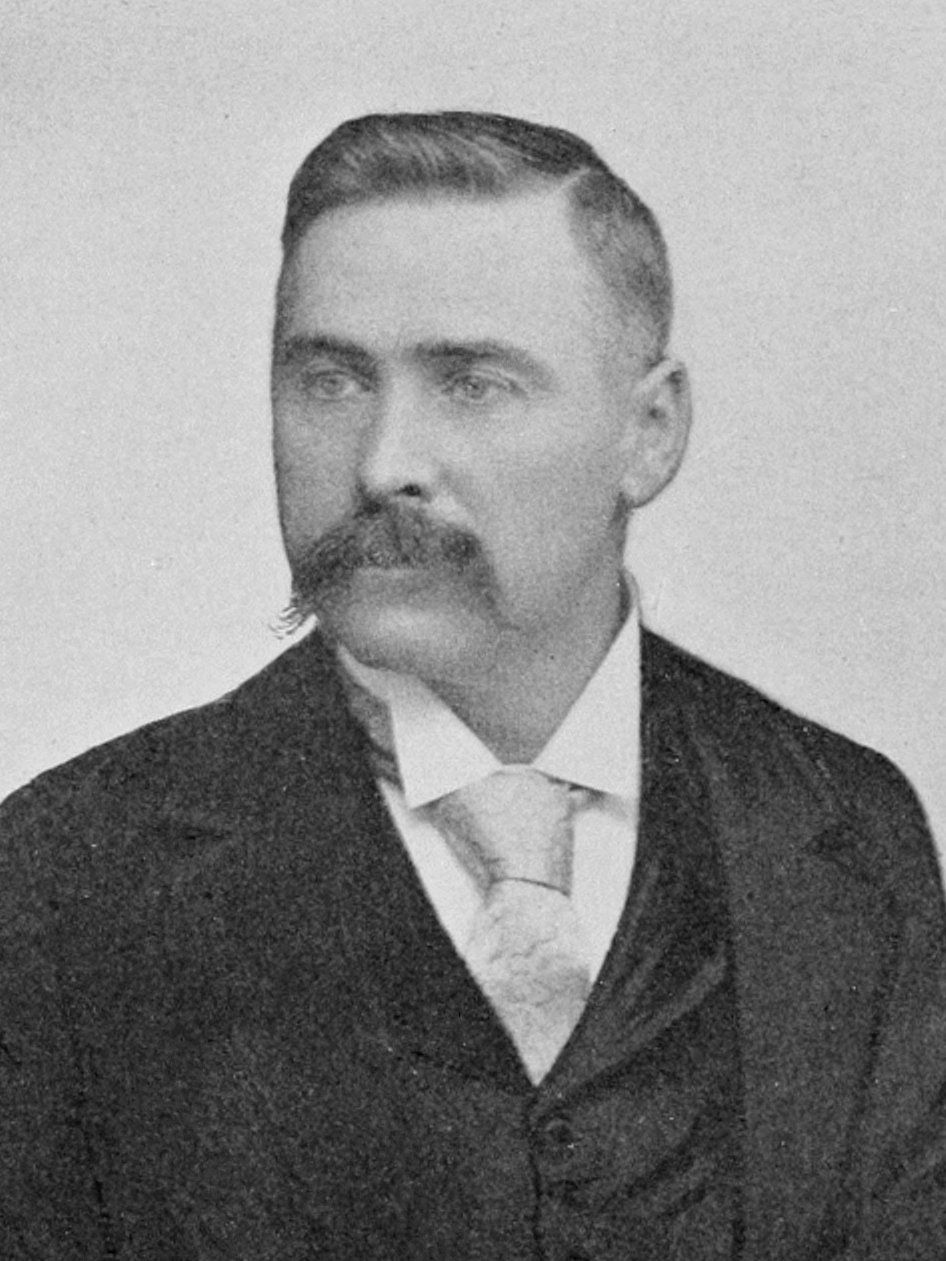

Member of the U.S. House of Representatives from South Dakota's at-large district
- In office March 4, 1897 – March 3, 1899
- Preceded by: John Pickler
- Succeeded by: Charles H. Burke

Personal details
- Born: March 27, 1853 near Portage, Wisconsin, U.S.
- Died: August 5, 1941 (aged 88) Minneapolis, Minnesota, U.S.
- Party: Populist
- Occupation: Publisher; businessman

John Edward Kelley (March 27, 1853 – August 5, 1941) was a newspaperman and a politician from South Dakota who served one term in the United States House of Representatives.

== Biography ==
John E. Kelley was born near Portage, Wisconsin on March 27, 1853. He attended the public schools, and as a young man he worked at lumber camps in Wisconsin and Minnesota.

Kelley moved to Colman in the Dakota Territory in 1878. He operated a successful farm and timber business, and from 1894 to 1897 was owner and publisher of the Flandreau Herald newspaper.

Originally a Democrat, Kelley was elected to the South Dakota House of Representatives in 1890 and 1891.

He joined the Populist Party in 1890, and ran unsuccessfully for the United States House of Representatives in 1892 and 1894. In 1896 he was elected to Seat A, one of South Dakota's two at-large U.S. House seats, and he served in the 55th United States Congress, March 4, 1897 to March 3, 1899. He was an unsuccessful candidate for reelection in 1898, and returned to his farming and business interests.

Kelley later returned to the Democratic Party, and served as a Delegate to the 1912 Democratic National Convention. From 1915 to 1918 he served as Register of the United States Land Office in Pierre, South Dakota.

He later moved to St. Paul, Minnesota, and become editor of the Co-operators Herald. He died in Minneapolis on August 5, 1941, and was buried at Saint Mary's Cemetery in Minneapolis.

U.S. House of Representatives
Preceded by John Pickler	Member of the U.S. House of Representatives from South Dakota's at-large congressional district 1897–1899	Succeeded by Charles H. Burke
