= Faulkton American Legion Hall =

- U.S. National Register of Historic Places
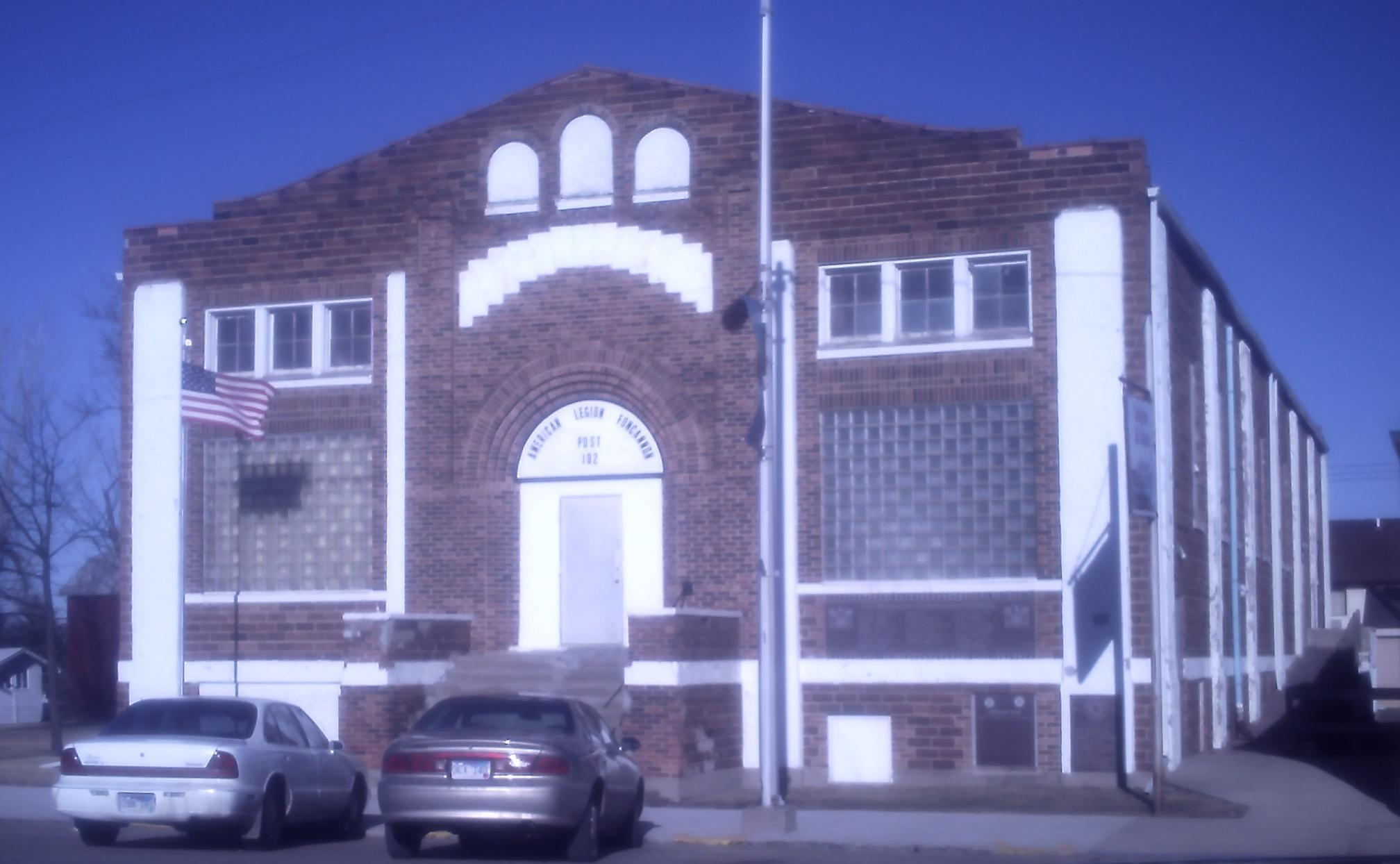

- Location within South Dakota Location within the United States
- Location: 107 Eighth Ave. N, Faulkton, South Dakota
- Coordinates: 45°2′15″N 99°7′26″W
- Area: less than one acre
- Built: 1924
- Architectural style: Late 19th and Early 20th Century American Movements, Commercial Style
- NRHP reference No.: 05000034
- Added to NRHP: February 10, 2005

The Faulkton American Legion Hall, also known as Faulkton Community Hall, was built in 1924. It was listed on the National Register of Historic Places in 2005. It reflects Late 19th and Early 20th Century American Movements architecture and Commercial Style architecture, and served historically as a meeting hall.

It is a 50 feet (15 m) by 120 feet (37 m) building, with a large main floor and a basement, into which a bowling alley was installed in 1947.
