= Wessington, South Dakota =

- City
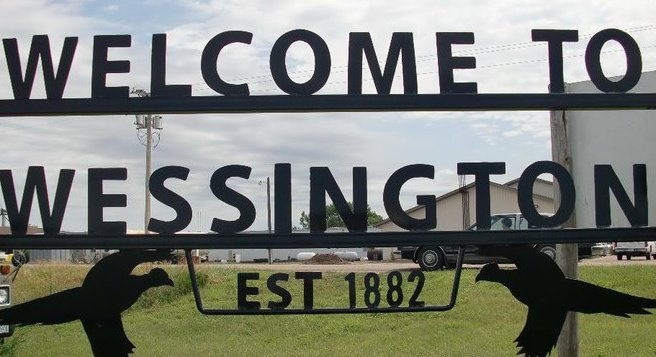
- Welcome sign in Wessington

- Location in Beadle County and the state of South Dakota
- Coordinates: 44°27′18″N 98°41′48″W
- Country: United States
- State: South Dakota
- Counties: Beadle, Hand
- Incorporated: 1915

Area
  - Total: 0.38 sq mi (0.98 km^{2})
  - Land: 0.38 sq mi (0.98 km^{2})
  - Water: 0 sq mi (0.00 km^{2})
- Elevation: 1,414 ft (431 m)

Population (2020)
  - Total: 197
  - Density: 521.5/sq mi (201.35/km^{2})
- Time zone: UTC-6 (Central (CST))
  - Summer (DST): UTC-5 (CDT)
- ZIP code: 57381
- Area code: 605
- FIPS code: 46-70140
- GNIS feature ID: 1267631

Wessington is a city on the border between Beadle and Hand counties in South Dakota, United States. The population was 197 at the 2020 census.

== History ==
A post office has been in operation in Wessington since 1882. The city took its name from the nearby Wessington Hills.

The early growth of Wessington began because it was a transshipment point for locally produced grains because of the railroad (C. & N.W. Ry. Co.). This allowed local producers lower shipping costs compared to villages further from railroads, encouraging the location of other businesses in the town. Wessington originally was located in Beadle County; the cohesiveness of the community soon led to growth into neighboring Hand County.

In 1918, there was a flourishing natural ice business that provisioned refrigerated freight cars. The cattle industry in the area has increased the market quality of the nation's cattle through improvements in herd management and adaptations to changing consumer demands. Many producers have received national recognition throughout the years.

== Geography ==
According to the United States Census Bureau, the city has a total area of 0.38 square miles (0.98 km^{2}), all land.

== Demographics ==
Historical population
Census	Pop.	Note	%±
1910	576		—
1920	728		26.4%
1930	681		−6.5%
1940	516		−24.2%
1950	467		−9.5%
1960	378		−19.1%
1970	380		0.5%
1980	327		−13.9%
1990	265		−19.0%
2000	248		−6.4%
2010	170		−31.5%
2020	197		15.9%
U.S. Decennial Census

=== 2020 census ===
As of the 2020 census, Wessington had a population of 197. The median age was 38.1 years. 32.0% of residents were under the age of 18 and 20.3% of residents were 65 years of age or older. For every 100 females there were 93.1 males, and for every 100 females age 18 and over there were 106.2 males age 18 and over.

0.0% of residents lived in urban areas, while 100.0% lived in rural areas.

There were 92 households in Wessington, of which 26.1% had children under the age of 18 living in them. Of all households, 40.2% were married-couple households, 33.7% were households with a male householder and no spouse or partner present, and 21.7% were households with a female householder and no spouse or partner present. About 45.7% of all households were made up of individuals and 21.7% had someone living alone who was 65 years of age or older.

There were 120 housing units, of which 23.3% were vacant. The homeowner vacancy rate was 0.0% and the rental vacancy rate was 15.8%.

Racial composition as of the 2020 census
Race	Number	Percent
White	183	92.9%
Black or African American	1	0.5%
American Indian and Alaska Native	0	0.0%
Asian	2	1.0%
Native Hawaiian and Other Pacific Islander	0	0.0%
Some other race	3	1.5%
Two or more races	8	4.1%
Hispanic or Latino (of any race)	8	4.1%

=== 2010 census ===
As of the census of 2010, there were 170 people, 91 households, and 44 families residing in the city. The population density was 447.4 inhabitants per square mile (172.7/km^{2}). There were 139 housing units at an average density of 365.8 per square mile (141.2/km^{2}). The racial makeup of the city was 98.8% White and 1.2% from two or more races. Hispanic or Latino of any race were 1.2% of the population.

There were 91 households, of which 12.1% had children under the age of 18 living with them, 42.9% were married couples living together, 3.3% had a female householder with no husband present, 2.2% had a male householder with no wife present, and 51.6% were non-families. 47.3% of all households were made up of individuals, and 19.8% had someone living alone who was 65 years of age or older. The average household size was 1.87 and the average family size was 2.64.

The median age in the city was 53.6 years. 12.9% of residents were under the age of 18; 7.8% were between the ages of 18 and 24; 11.2% were from 25 to 44; 37.6% were from 45 to 64; and 30.6% were 65 years of age or older. The gender makeup of the city was 50.0% male and 50.0% female.

=== 2000 census ===
As of the census of 2000, there were 248 people, 118 households, and 69 families residing in the city. The population density was 660.7 inhabitants per square mile (255.1/km^{2}). There were 143 housing units at an average density of 381.0 per square mile (147.1/km^{2}). The racial makeup of the city was 97.98% White, 0.40% African American, 0.40% Native American, and 1.21% from two or more races. Hispanic or Latino of any race were 1.21% of the population.

There were 118 households, out of which 22.9% had children under the age of 18 living with them, 45.8% were married couples living together, 9.3% had a female householder with no husband present, and 41.5% were non-families. 39.0% of all households were made up of individuals, and 25.4% had someone living alone who was 65 years of age or older. The average household size was 2.10 and the average family size was 2.81.

In the city, the population was spread out, with 25.0% under the age of 18, 3.6% from 18 to 24, 23.4% from 25 to 44, 19.8% from 45 to 64, and 28.2% who were 65 years of age or older. The median age was 44 years. For every 100 females, there were 89.3 males. For every 100 females age 18 and over, there were 80.6 males.

The median income for a household in the city was $21,250, and the median income for a family was $35,750. Males had a median income of $26,250 versus $16,964 for females. The per capita income for the city was $13,767. About 7.0% of families and 11.3% of the population were below the poverty line, including 10.0% of those under the age of eighteen and 25.0% of those 65 or over.

== Notable people ==
- Robert N. Duxbury, South Dakota state legislator

== See also ==
- List of cities in South Dakota
