= Orient, South Dakota =

- Town
- Location in Faulk County and the state of South Dakota
- Coordinates: 44°54′06″N 99°05′20″W
- Country: United States
- State: South Dakota
- County: Faulk
- Founded: 1887

Area
  - Total: 0.30 sq mi (0.78 km^{2})
  - Land: 0.29 sq mi (0.76 km^{2})
  - Water: 0.0077 sq mi (0.02 km^{2})
- Elevation: 1,608 ft (490 m)

Population (2020)
  - Total: 51
  - Density: 173.7/sq mi (67.05/km^{2})
- Time zone: UTC-6 (Central (CST))
  - Summer (DST): UTC-5 (CDT)
- Area code: 605
- FIPS code: 46-47460
- GNIS feature ID: 1267525

Orient is a town in Faulk County, South Dakota, United States. The population was 51 at the 2020 census.

Orient got its start in 1887 when the Milwaukee Railroad was extended into the area.

== Geography ==
According to the United States Census Bureau, the town has a total area of 0.30 square miles (0.78 km^{2}), of which 0.29 square miles (0.75 km^{2}) is land and 0.01 square miles (0.03 km^{2}) is water.

== Demographics ==
Historical population
Census	Pop.	Note	%±
1930	302		—
1940	250		−17.2%
1950	206		−17.6%
1960	133		−35.4%
1970	131		−1.5%
1980	87		−33.6%
1990	59		−32.2%
2000	57		−3.4%
2010	63		10.5%
2020	51		−19.0%
U.S. Decennial Census

=== 2010 census ===
As of the census of 2010, there were 63 people, 30 households, and 16 families residing in the town. The population density was 217.2 inhabitants per square mile (83.9/km^{2}). There were 38 housing units at an average density of 131.0 per square mile (50.6/km^{2}). The racial makeup of the town was 100.0% White.

There were 30 households, of which 23.3% had children under the age of 18 living with them, 50.0% were married couples living together, 3.3% had a female householder with no husband present, and 46.7% were non-families. 46.7% of all households were made up of individuals, and 20% had someone living alone who was 65 years of age or older. The average household size was 2.10 and the average family size was 3.06.

The median age in the town was 49.1 years. 22.2% of residents were under the age of 18; 6.4% were between the ages of 18 and 24; 9.6% were from 25 to 44; 42.9% were from 45 to 64; and 19% were 65 years of age or older. The gender makeup of the town was 57.1% male and 42.9% female.

=== 2000 census ===
As of the census of 2000, there were 57 people, 25 households, and 14 families residing in the town. The population density was 183.2 inhabitants per square mile (70.7/km^{2}). There were 38 housing units at an average density of 122.1 per square mile (47.1/km^{2}). The racial makeup of the town was 100.00% White.

There were 25 households, out of which 24.0% had children under the age of 18 living with them, 56.0% were married couples living together, and 44.0% were non-families. 44.0% of all households were made up of individuals, and 20.0% had someone living alone who was 65 years of age or older. The average household size was 2.28 and the average family size was 3.29.

In the town, the population was spread out, with 28.1% under the age of 18, 5.3% from 18 to 24, 28.1% from 25 to 44, 19.3% from 45 to 64, and 19.3% who were 65 years of age or older. The median age was 42 years. For every 100 females, there were 103.6 males. For every 100 females age 18 and over, there were 115.8 males.

The median income for a household in the town was $18,750, and the median income for a family was $37,750. Males had a median income of $0 versus $6,250 for females. The per capita income for the town was $12,849. There were 30.8% of families and 54.5% of the population living below the poverty line, including 100.0% of under eighteens and none of those over 64.
