= Rockham, South Dakota =

- Town
- Location in Faulk County and the state of South Dakota
- Coordinates: 44°54′15″N 98°49′24″W
- Country: United States
- State: South Dakota
- County: Faulk
- Platted: 1886

Area
  - Total: 0.50 sq mi (1.29 km^{2})
  - Land: 0.50 sq mi (1.29 km^{2})
  - Water: 0 sq mi (0.00 km^{2})
- Elevation: 1,401 ft (427 m)

Population (2020)
  - Total: 22
  - Density: 44.2/sq mi (17.06/km^{2})
- Time zone: UTC-6 (Central (CST))
  - Summer (DST): UTC-5 (CDT)
- ZIP code: 57470
- Area code: 605
- FIPS code: 46-55540
- GNIS feature ID: 1267553

Rockham is a town in Faulk County, South Dakota, United States, off U.S. Route 212, and was a stop on the old Chicago and North Western Railway. The population was 22 at the 2020 census.

== History ==
Rockham was platted in 1886. It was named after Rockhampton, in Australia. A post office has been in operation in Rockham since 1887.

The Chicago & North Western Railway constructed a rail line from Redfield to Faulkton in 1886. Rockham was founded as a stop on the railway that year, in 1886 on land originally homesteaded by Anders Opperud, and was incorporated on March 4, 1909. Rockham's first school, the F.M. Brown School, was erected in 1884; the Rockham Public School was built in 1915. Rockham received its first telephone service in 1903 and electrical power was distributed throughout the city in 1919.

In 1925, the Rockham Public School was damaged by a tornado.

In 1970, the Chicago & North Western Railway abandoned its rail line from Redfield to Gettysburg, leaving Rockham without rail service for hauling grain.

The Rockham Public School closed in 1972.

Rockham celebrated its centennial on July 4–6, 1986.

== Geography ==
According to the United States Census Bureau, the town has a total area of 0.50 square miles (1.29 km^{2}), all land.

== Demographics ==
Historical population
Census	Pop.	Note	%±
1910	286		—
1920	347		21.3%
1930	288		−17.0%
1940	220		−23.6%
1950	113		−48.6%
1960	197		74.3%
1970	60		−69.5%
1980	52		−13.3%
1990	48		−7.7%
2000	53		10.4%
2010	33		−37.7%
2020	22		−33.3%
U.S. Decennial Census

=== 2010 census ===
As of the census of 2010, there were 33 people, 13 households, and 6 families residing in the town. The population density was 66.0 inhabitants per square mile (25.5/km^{2}). There were 28 housing units at an average density of 56.0 per square mile (21.6/km^{2}). The racial makeup of the town was 100.0% White.

There were 13 households, of which 23.1% had children under the age of 18 living with them, 46.2% were married couples living together, and 53.8% were non-families. 38.5% of all households were made up of individuals, and 15.4% had someone living alone who was 65 years of age or older. The average household size was 2.54 and the average family size was 4.00.

The median age in the town was 34.5 years. 36.4% of residents were under the age of 18; 0.0% were between the ages of 18 and 24; 15.2% were from 25 to 44; 27.4% were from 45 to 64; and 21.2% were 65 years of age or older. The gender makeup of the town was 60.6% male and 39.4% female.

=== 2000 census ===
As of the census of 2000, there were 53 people, 18 households, and 14 families residing in the town. The population density was 107.2 inhabitants per square mile (41.4/km^{2}). There were 27 housing units at an average density of 54.6 per square mile (21.1/km^{2}). The racial makeup of the town was 98.11% White, and 1.89% from two or more races.

There were 18 households, out of which 38.9% had children under the age of 18 living with them, 77.8% were married couples living together, and 22.2% were non-families. 22.2% of all households were made up of individuals, and 5.6% had someone living alone who was 65 years of age or older. The average household size was 2.94 and the average family size was 3.43.

In the town, the population was spread out, with 30.2% under the age of 18, 1.9% from 18 to 24, 35.8% from 25 to 44, 15.1% from 45 to 64, and 17.0% who were 65 years of age or older. The median age was 36 years. For every 100 females, there were 112.0 males. For every 100 females age 18 and over, there were 105.6 males.

The median income for a household in the town was $35,625, and the median income for a family was $68,750. Males had a median income of $23,750 versus $16,667 for females. The per capita income for the town was $19,511. None of the population and none of the families were below the poverty line.
