= Ree Creek =

River in South Dakota, U.S.

Coordinates: 44°35′20″N 98°47′28″W

Ree Creek is a stream in the U.S. state of South Dakota. The creek was named after the Ree Indians.

== See also ==
- List of rivers of South Dakota
