= Vayland, South Dakota =

Unincorporated community in South Dakota, U.S.

Coordinates: 44°29′37″N 98°47′56″W

Vayland is an unincorporated community in Hand County, in the U.S. state of South Dakota.

== History ==
A post office called Vayland was established in 1909, and remained in operation until 1972. The community derives its name from J. C. McViegh, an early settler.
