= Cresbard, South Dakota =

- Town
- Location in Faulk County and the state of South Dakota
- Coordinates: 45°10′09″N 98°56′52″W
- Country: United States
- State: South Dakota
- County: Faulk
- Incorporated: 1909

Area
  - Total: 0.42 sq mi (1.08 km^{2})
  - Land: 0.41 sq mi (1.07 km^{2})
  - Water: 0.0039 sq mi (0.01 km^{2})
- Elevation: 1,450 ft (440 m)

Population (2020)
  - Total: 96
  - Density: 231.5/sq mi (89.38/km^{2})
- Time zone: UTC-6 (Central (CST))
  - Summer (DST): UTC-5 (CDT)
- ZIP code: 57435
- Area code: 605
- FIPS code: 46-14580
- GNIS feature ID: 1267340
- Website: www.cresbardsd.com

Cresbard is a town in Faulk County, South Dakota, United States. The population was 96 at the 2020 census.

== Geography ==
According to the United States Census Bureau, the town has a total area of 0.42 square miles (1.09 km^{2}), all land.

== Demographics ==
Historical population
Census	Pop.	Note	%±
1910	320		—
1920	349		9.1%
1930	358		2.6%
1940	288		−19.6%
1950	235		−18.4%
1960	229		−2.6%
1970	224		−2.2%
1980	221		−1.3%
1990	185		−16.3%
2000	143		−22.7%
2010	104		−27.3%
2020	96		−7.7%
U.S. Decennial Census

=== 2010 census ===
As of the census of 2010, there were 104 people, 61 households, and 34 families residing in the town. The population density was 247.6 inhabitants per square mile (95.6/km^{2}). There were 85 housing units at an average density of 202.4 per square mile (78.1/km^{2}). The racial makeup of the town was 100.0% White.

There were 61 households, of which 3.3% had children under the age of 18 living with them, 47.5% were married couples living together, 4.9% had a female householder with no husband present, 3.3% had a male householder with no wife present, and 44.3% were non-families. 39.3% of all households were made up of individuals, and 24.6% had someone living alone who was 65 years of age or older. The average household size was 1.70 and the average family size was 2.18.

The median age in the town was 63.5 years. 4.8% of residents were under the age of 18; 5.8% were between the ages of 18 and 24; 13.4% were from 25 to 44; 30.8% were from 45 to 64; and 45.2% were 65 years of age or older. The gender makeup of the town was 47.1% male and 52.9% female.

=== 2000 census ===
As of the census of 2000, there were 143 people, 72 households, and 47 families residing in the town. The population density was 340.6 inhabitants per square mile (131.5/km^{2}). There were 89 housing units at an average density of 212.0 per square mile (81.9/km^{2}). The racial makeup of the town was 98.60% White, 0.70% Asian, and 0.70% from two or more races.

There were 72 households, out of which 13.9% had children under the age of 18 living with them, 59.7% were married couples living together, 4.2% had a female householder with no husband present, and 34.7% were non-families. 33.3% of all households were made up of individuals, and 20.8% had someone living alone who was 65 years of age or older. The average household size was 1.99 and the average family size was 2.47.

In the town, the population was spread out, with 12.6% under the age of 18, 4.2% from 18 to 24, 16.8% from 25 to 44, 37.8% from 45 to 64, and 28.7% who were 65 years of age or older. The median age was 55 years. For every 100 females, there were 101.4 males. For every 100 females age 18 and over, there were 92.3 males.

The median income for a household in the town was $35,625, and the median income for a family was $44,250. Males had a median income of $27,500 versus $17,500 for females. The per capita income for the town was $18,241. There were none of the families and 3.7% of the population living below the poverty line, including no under eighteens and 12.2% of those over 64.

== History ==
Cresbard celebrated its centennial in 2006. The town was founded in 1906 when the Minneapolis & St Louis Railway completed a line from Watertown, South Dakota, to LeBeau, South Dakota on the east bank of the Missouri River. It was incorporated in 1909. The name is an amalgam of Cressey and Bard, the names of two local families. In its early years, it served as a grain and livestock center for the northern tier of Faulk County, South Dakota. Cresbard became a well known consolidated school district by the 1920s serving at least seven smaller communities in the surrounding area. The school's marching and concert band won national recognition in the 1950s and boys basketball and cross country teams won state titles.

The railway was abandoned by 1940 and State Highway 20 served as the town's main link to the outside world. Following a nationwide population upswing after World War II the agriculture-based economy of the area began to show a decreasing population. The population of the school fell from a high of 350 in the 60s and 70s to less than 100 students by the late 1990s.

Because of dwindling high school population (16 at last count) citizens of Cresbard spent several years exploring their options. In 2004 the town's total population fell to 121 and the decision was made to redistrict the schools. The high school closed and was offered for sale on the internet the following year at a price calculated to attract outside business. The building was initially bought as a headquarters for Keenspot comics, but was later resold to a local farmer.

As of 2007, the primary non-agricultural commercial venture in the town of Cresbard and surrounding areas is services related to the recreational hunting of pheasant, ducks, geese, deer, and buffalo.

Cresbard is also the home of a restaurant, museum, machine shop, two churches (one Lutheran Church—Missouri Synod and one Methodist), and a local fire and rescue. It is also home to Pheasant Fest South Dakota a lodge and pheasant hunting guide company.
