= Norbeck, South Dakota =

Unincorporated community in South Dakota

Coordinates: 45°11′03″N 99°12′45″W

Norbeck is an unincorporated community in Faulk County, South Dakota, United States.

== History ==
A post office called Norbeck was established in 1920, and remained in operation until 1971. The community has the name of Peter Norbeck, ninth Governor of South Dakota. The town was served by a branch of the Milwaukee Road which ran between Roscoe and Orient. During the Great Depression, the area suffered a drought and the town lost many residents.
