= Zell, South Dakota =

Unincorporated settlement in South Dakota, United States

Coordinates: 44°53′49″N 98°43′42″W

Zell is an unincorporated community in Faulk County, South Dakota, United States, astride U.S. Route 212. It was once a stop on the old Chicago and North Western Railway.

== History ==
A post office called Zell has been in operation since 1885. Zell was platted in 1886. Some say the community's name honors the local Zell family of settlers, while others believe the community was named after one or more of the places named Zell in Germany, Austria or Switzerland.

St. Mary's Church, School and Convent was founded in Zell in 1883. The Catholic school served the community until 1963. The complex was listed on the National Register of Historic Places in 1982.

The Chicago & North Western Railway constructed a rail line from Redfield to Faulkton in 1886. Originally the CNW intended to build its depot about two miles east. The congregation of St Mary's contributed funds to assist in the purchase of land, and successfully persuaded the CNW to build its station stop at Zell's now current location north of St. Mary's Church. The first locomotive and work train reached Zell on September 17, 1886, greeted by bells ringing at St Mary's. Shortly thereafter, in October 1886, the CNW railroad station at Zell was completed. A regularly scheduled mixed train (passenger and freight) then started, leaving Faulkton in the morning for Redfield, and leaving Redfield in the evening to return to Faulkton. In 1970, the Chicago & North Western Railway abandoned its rail line from Redfield to Gettysburg, leaving Zell without rail service.

The town is mentioned in Tillie Olsen’s unfinished novel Yonnondio. The Holbrooks become tenant farmers there after they leave the coal mining community in Wyoming.
