= Faulk County, South Dakota =

County in South Dakota, United States

- County
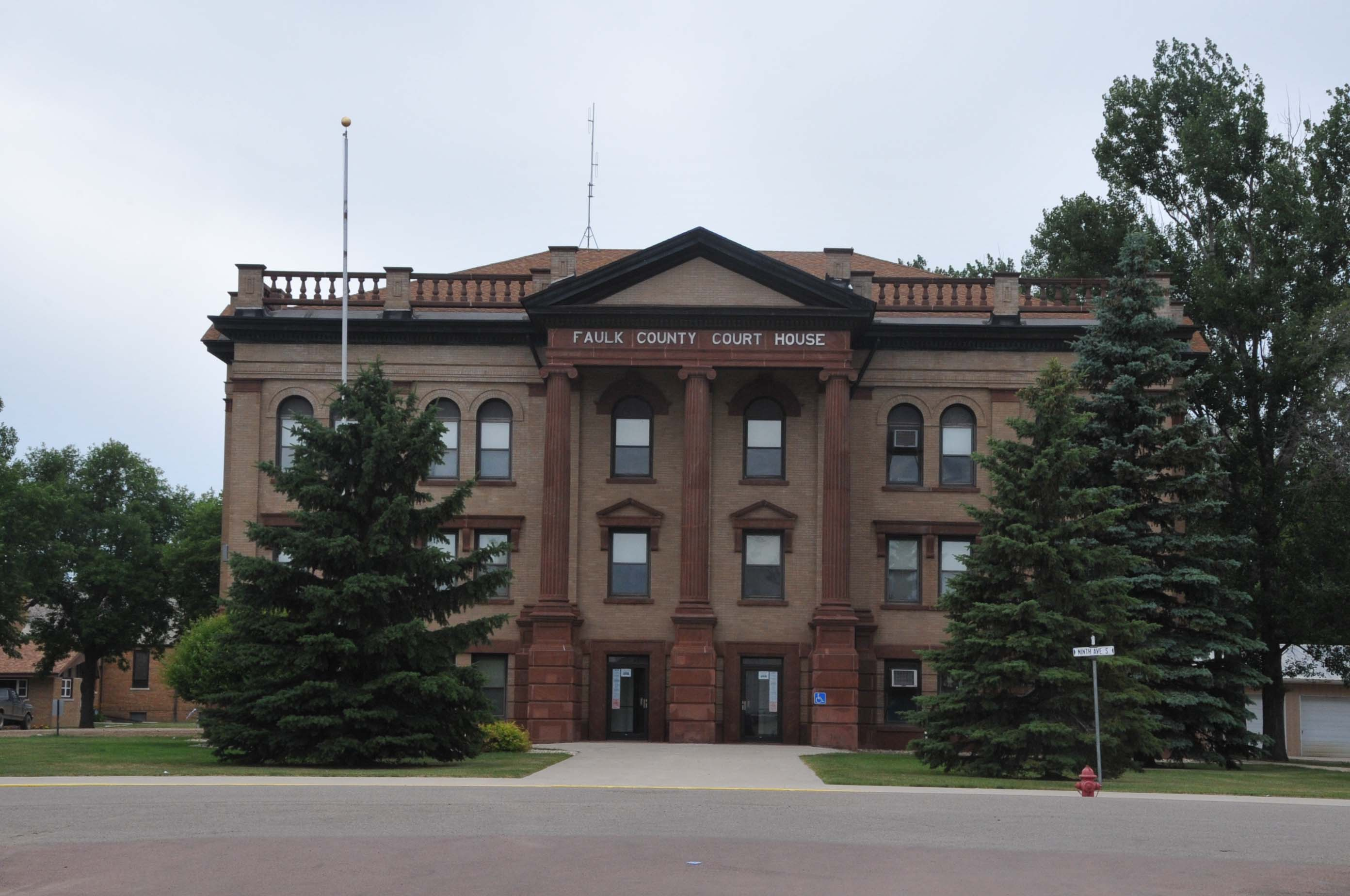
- Faulk County Courthouse in July 2013

- Location within the U.S. state of South Dakota
- Coordinates: 45°04′N 99°09′W
- Country: United States
- State: South Dakota
- Created: 1873
- Organized: 1883
- Named for: Andrew Jackson Faulk
- Seat: Faulkton
- Largest city: Faulkton

Area
  - Total: 1,006 sq mi (2,610 km^{2})
  - Land: 982 sq mi (2,540 km^{2})
  - Water: 24 sq mi (62 km^{2}) 2.4%

Population (2020)
  - Total: 2,125
  - Estimate (2025): 2,178 ▲
  - Density: 2.2/sq mi (0.85/km^{2})
- Time zone: UTC−6 (Central)
  - Summer (DST): UTC−5 (CDT)
- Congressional district: At-large

Faulk County is a county in the U.S. state of South Dakota. As of the 2020 census, the population was 2,125. Its county seat is Faulkton. The county was founded in 1873 and organized in 1883. It is named for Andrew Jackson Faulk, the third Governor of Dakota Territory.

== Geography ==
The terrain of Faulk County consists of low rolling hills, largely devoted to agriculture, sloping to the east. The highest point of the terrain is the county's SW corner, at 1,916 ft (584 m) ASL. The county has a total area of 1,006 square miles (2,610 km^{2}), of which 982 square miles (2,540 km^{2}) is land and 24 square miles (62 km^{2}) (2.4%) is water.

=== Major highways ===
- U.S. Highway 212
- South Dakota Highway 20
- South Dakota Highway 45
- South Dakota Highway 47

=== Adjacent counties ===
- Edmunds County – north
- Brown County – northeast
- Spink County – east
- Hand County – south
- Hyde County – southwest
- Potter County – west

=== Protected areas ===
- Lake Faulkton State Game Refuge
- Ingalls State Game Production Area
- Gerkin State Game Production Area & Wildlife Refuge
- Lake Faulkton State Game Production Area
- Lake Faulkton State Lakeside Use Area
- North Scatterwood Lake State Waterfowl Refuge
- Sprague State Game Production Area
- South Scatterwood State Game Production Area

=== Lakes ===
- Clark Lake
- Lake Creabard
- Lake Faulkton
- North Scatterwood Lake (partial)
- South Scatterwood Lake
- Zell Lake

== Demographics ==
Historical population
Census	Pop.	Note	%±
1880	4		—
1890	4,062		101,450.0%
1900	3,547		−12.7%
1910	6,716		89.3%
1920	6,442		−4.1%
1930	6,895		7.0%
1940	5,168		−25.0%
1950	4,752		−8.0%
1960	4,397		−7.5%
1970	3,893		−11.5%
1980	3,327		−14.5%
1990	2,744		−17.5%
2000	2,640		−3.8%
2010	2,364		−10.5%
2020	2,125		−10.1%
2025 (est.)	2,178	▲	2.5%
U.S. Decennial Census:

=== 2020 census ===
As of the 2020 census, there were 2,125 people, 761 households, and 476 families residing in the county. The population density was 2.2 inhabitants per square mile (0.85/km^{2}).

Of the residents, 22.3% were under the age of 18 and 27.1% were 65 years of age or older; the median age was 46.4 years. For every 100 females there were 97.3 males, and for every 100 females age 18 and over there were 97.8 males.

The racial makeup of the county was 94.8% White, 0.1% Black or African American, 2.1% American Indian and Alaska Native, 0.1% Asian, 0.5% from some other race, and 2.4% from two or more races. Hispanic or Latino residents of any race comprised 2.2% of the population.

There were 761 households in the county, of which 25.4% had children under the age of 18 living with them and 18.7% had a female householder with no spouse or partner present. About 33.6% of all households were made up of individuals and 19.1% had someone living alone who was 65 years of age or older.

There were 1,022 housing units, of which 25.5% were vacant. Among occupied housing units, 81.6% were owner-occupied and 18.4% were renter-occupied. The homeowner vacancy rate was 2.0% and the rental vacancy rate was 26.3%.

=== 2010 census ===
As of the 2010 census, there were 2,364 people, 869 households, and 532 families in the county. The population density was 2.4 inhabitants per square mile (0.93/km^{2}). There were 1,136 housing units at an average density of 1.2 units per square mile (0.46 units/km^{2}). The racial makeup of the county was 98.9% white, 0.1% Asian, 0.1% American Indian, 0.1% black or African American, 0.0% from other races, and 0.7% from two or more races. Those of Hispanic or Latino origin made up 0.8% of the population. In terms of ancestry, 70.0% were German, 9.6% were Irish, 7.1% were English, 5.7% were Norwegian, and 4.3% were American.

Of the 869 households, 20.6% had children under the age of 18 living with them, 54.9% were married couples living together, 4.1% had a female householder with no husband present, 38.8% were non-families, and 36.1% of all households were made up of individuals. The average household size was 2.15 and the average family size was 2.79. The median age was 46.9 years.

The median income for a household in the county was $38,203 and the median income for a family was $55,234. Males had a median income of $40,641 versus $23,571 for females. The per capita income for the county was $21,898. About 14.4% of families and 17.9% of the population were below the poverty line, including 15.3% of those under age 18 and 14.3% of those age 65 or over.

== Communities ==
=== City ===
- Faulkton (county seat)

=== Towns ===
- Chelsea
- Cresbard
- Onaka
- Orient
- Rockham
- Seneca

=== Census-designated places ===
- Blumengard Colony
- Brentwood Colony
- Evergreen Colony
- Thunderbird Colony

=== Unincorporated communities ===
- Miranda
- Norbeck
- Wecota
- Zell

=== Townships ===
- Arcade
- Bryant
- Centerville
- Clark
- Devoe
- Ellisville
- Elroy
- Emerson
- Enterprise
- Fairview
- Freedom
- Hillsdale
- Irving
- Lafoon
- Latham
- Myron
- O'Neil
- Orient
- Pioneer
- Pulaski
- Saratoga
- Seneca
- Sherman
- Tamworth
- Thirteen
- Union
- Wesley
- Zell

== Politics ==
Faulk County voters have largely voted Republican for several decades. In only two national elections since 1944 has the county selected the Democratic Party candidate (as of 2024).

United States presidential election results for Faulk County, South Dakota
Year	Republican		Democratic		Third party(ies)	
Year	No.	%	No.	%	No.	%
1892	473	63.75%	107	14.42%	162	21.83%
1896	430	64.08%	237	35.32%	4	0.60%
1900	618	65.05%	302	31.79%	30	3.16%
1904	727	75.41%	165	17.12%	72	7.47%
1908	835	62.55%	421	31.54%	79	5.92%
1912	0	0.00%	615	47.38%	683	52.62%
1916	759	52.89%	629	43.83%	47	3.28%
1920	1,341	65.51%	346	16.90%	360	17.59%
1924	1,112	56.08%	277	13.97%	594	29.95%
1928	1,907	62.46%	1,135	37.18%	11	0.36%
1932	1,141	38.94%	1,743	59.49%	46	1.57%
1936	1,111	43.48%	1,404	54.95%	40	1.57%
1940	1,431	54.41%	1,199	45.59%	0	0.00%
1944	1,090	54.88%	896	45.12%	0	0.00%
1948	1,054	51.49%	971	47.44%	22	1.07%
1952	1,619	68.69%	738	31.31%	0	0.00%
1956	1,260	52.17%	1,155	47.83%	0	0.00%
1960	1,240	54.31%	1,043	45.69%	0	0.00%
1964	974	44.29%	1,225	55.71%	0	0.00%
1968	997	49.48%	819	40.65%	199	9.88%
1972	1,004	50.07%	986	49.18%	15	0.75%
1976	868	44.81%	1,063	54.88%	6	0.31%
1980	1,300	66.84%	520	26.74%	125	6.43%
1984	1,124	65.89%	579	33.94%	3	0.18%
1988	842	53.94%	714	45.74%	5	0.32%
1992	658	45.89%	488	34.03%	288	20.08%
1996	726	52.27%	493	35.49%	170	12.24%
2000	904	68.02%	388	29.19%	37	2.78%
2004	945	69.03%	418	30.53%	6	0.44%
2008	739	62.00%	426	35.74%	27	2.27%
2012	765	67.88%	331	29.37%	31	2.75%
2016	858	76.74%	204	18.25%	56	5.01%
2020	964	81.56%	198	16.75%	20	1.69%
2024	920	81.42%	183	16.19%	27	2.39%

== See also ==
- National Register of Historic Places listings in Faulk County, South Dakota
