= Hand County, South Dakota =

County in South Dakota, United States

- County
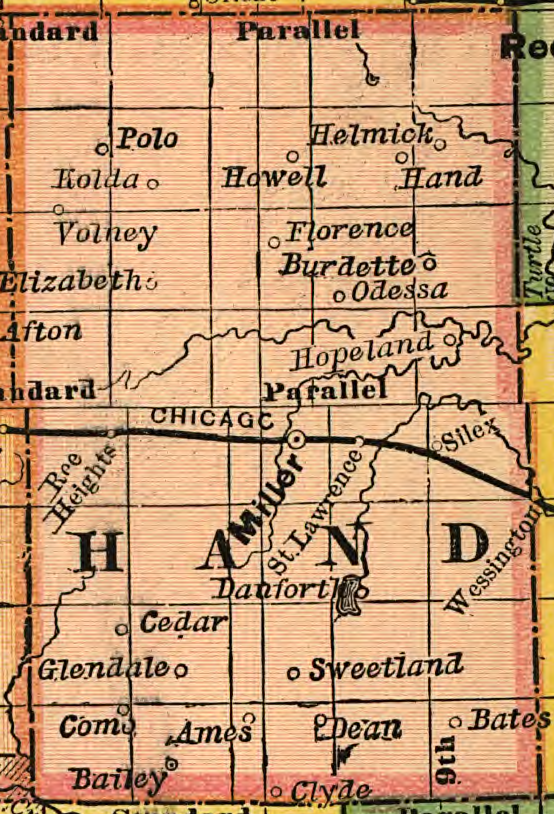
- Hand County and its towns and villages in 1892

- Location within the U.S. state of South Dakota
- Coordinates: 44.55°N 99.00°W
- Country: United States
- State: South Dakota
- Created: 1873
- Redrawn: 1882
- Organized: 1882
- Named for: George A. Hand
- Seat: Miller
- Largest city: Miller

Area
  - Total: 1,440 sq mi (3,700 km^{2})
  - Land: 1,437 sq mi (3,720 km^{2})
  - Water: 3.6 sq mi (9.3 km^{2}) 0.2%

Population (2020)
  - Total: 3,145
  - Estimate (2025): 3,121 ▼
  - Density: 2.2/sq mi (0.85/km^{2})
- Time zone: UTC−6 (Central)
  - Summer (DST): UTC−5 (CDT)
- Congressional district: At-large
- Website: handcountysd.gov

Hand County is a county in the U.S. state of South Dakota. As of the 2020 census, the population was 3,145. Its county seat is Miller.

== History ==
Hand County was named for George A. Hand, territorial secretary. It was created in 1873 by the Dakota territorial legislature. The boundaries were finalized in 1882, the year it was organized.

== Geography ==
The terrain of Hand County consists of rolling hills, dotted with infrequent ponds and small lakes. Most of the area is devoted to agriculture. The terrain slopes to the east and northeast; its highest point is on the lower part of the county's west boundary line, at 2,080 ft (630 m) ASL. The county contains a total area of 1,440 square miles (3,700 km^{2}), of which 1,437 square miles (3,720 km^{2}) is land and 3.6 square miles (9.3 km^{2}) (0.2%) is water.

=== Major highways ===
- U.S. Highway 14
- U.S. Highway 212
- South Dakota Highway 26
- South Dakota Highway 45

=== Adjacent counties ===
- Faulk County – north
- Spink County – northeast
- Beadle County – east
- Jerauld County – southeast
- Buffalo County – southwest
- Hyde County – west

=== Protected areas ===
- Collins State Game Production Area
- Dakota State Game Production Area
- East Pearl State Game Production Area
- Hawkins State Game Production Area
- Lake Jones State Game Production Area
- Lake Louise State Game Production Area
- Lake Louise State Recreation Area
- Lechtenberg State Game Production Area
- Reinhardt State Game Production Area
- Rosehill State Game Production Area
- Spring Lake State Game Production Area
- West Pearl State Game Production Area

=== Lakes ===
- Costigan Slough Lake
- Jones Lake
- Lake Louise
- Matter Lake
- Spring Lake
- Wall Lake

== Demographics ==
Historical population
Census	Pop.	Note	%±
1880	153		—
1890	6,346		4,047.7%
1900	4,525		−28.7%
1910	7,870		73.9%
1920	8,778		11.5%
1930	9,485		8.1%
1940	7,166		−24.4%
1950	7,149		−0.2%
1960	6,712		−6.1%
1970	5,883		−12.4%
1980	4,948		−15.9%
1990	4,272		−13.7%
2000	3,741		−12.4%
2010	3,431		−8.3%
2020	3,145		−8.3%
2025 (est.)	3,121	▼	−0.8%
U.S. Decennial Census

=== 2020 census ===
As of the 2020 census, the county had a population of 3,145, 1,348 households, and 891 families residing in the county. Of the residents, 21.7% were under the age of 18 and 26.2% were 65 years of age or older; the median age was 46.9 years. For every 100 females there were 101.1 males, and for every 100 females age 18 and over there were 99.9 males.

The racial makeup of the county was 95.6% White, 0.2% Black or African American, 0.3% American Indian and Alaska Native, 0.2% Asian, 1.1% from some other race, and 2.5% from two or more races. Hispanic or Latino residents of any race comprised 1.6% of the population.

The population density was 2.2 inhabitants per square mile (0.85/km^{2}). There were 1,705 housing units, of which 20.9% were vacant. Among occupied housing units, 72.5% were owner-occupied and 27.5% were renter-occupied. The homeowner vacancy rate was 1.6% and the rental vacancy rate was 15.0%.

There were 1,348 households in the county, of which 25.4% had children under the age of 18 living with them and 20.0% had a female householder with no spouse or partner present. About 30.8% of all households were made up of individuals and 15.0% had someone living alone who was 65 years of age or older.

=== 2010 census ===
As of the 2010 census, there were 3,431 people, 1,494 households, and 972 families residing in the county. The population density was 2.4 inhabitants per square mile (0.93/km^{2}). There were 1,815 housing units at an average density of 1.3 units per square mile (0.50 units/km^{2}). The racial makeup of the county was 98.4% white, 0.3% Asian, 0.2% American Indian, 0.1% black or African American, 0.2% from other races, and 0.8% from two or more races. Those of Hispanic or Latino origin made up 0.6% of the population. In terms of ancestry, 57.3% were German, 15.3% were Irish, 9.0% were Norwegian, 8.1% were English, 6.1% were Dutch, and 3.4% were American.

Of the 1,494 households, 23.8% had children under the age of 18 living with them, 56.6% were married couples living together, 5.3% had a female householder with no husband present, 34.9% were non-families, and 32.2% of all households were made up of individuals. The average household size was 2.26 and the average family size was 2.84. The median age was 48.2 years.

The median income for a household in the county was $45,895 and the median income for a family was $52,407. Males had a median income of $40,725 versus $24,844 for females. The per capita income for the county was $23,238. About 11.4% of families and 13.1% of the population were below the poverty line, including 18.9% of those under age 18 and 16.5% of those age 65 or over.

== Communities ==
=== Cities ===
- Miller (county seat)
- Wessington (partial)

=== Towns ===
- Ree Heights
- St. Lawrence

=== Census-designated place ===
- Millerdale Colony

=== Unincorporated communities ===
- Polo
- Vayland

=== Townships ===
- Alden
- Alpha
- Bates
- Burdette
- Campbell
- Carlton
- Cedar
- Como
- Florence
- Gilbert
- Glendale
- Grand
- Greenleaf
- Hiland
- Holden
- Hulbert
- Linn
- Logan
- Midland
- Miller
- Mondamin
- Ohio
- Ontario
- Park
- Pearl
- Plato
- Pleasant Valley
- Ree Heights
- Riverside
- Rockdale
- Rose Hill
- St. Lawrence
- Spring Hill
- Spring Lake
- Wheaton
- York

=== Unorganized territory ===
The county contains one area of unorganized territory: Northwest Hand.

== Politics ==
Hand County voters have voted Republican for many decades. In only one national election since 1936 has the county selected the Democratic Party candidate. As shown in the table below, Hand County has voted the same way as South Dakota for more than a century, last voting for a candidate who lost South Dakota in 1916, when Hand County voted Democratic but South Dakota went Republican.

United States presidential election results for Hand County, South Dakota
Year	Republican		Democratic		Third party(ies)	
Year	No.	%	No.	%	No.	%
1892	526	44.46%	70	5.92%	587	49.62%
1896	451	43.96%	567	55.26%	8	0.78%
1900	592	49.05%	594	49.21%	21	1.74%
1904	943	67.50%	170	12.17%	284	20.33%
1908	851	51.58%	655	39.70%	144	8.73%
1912	0	0.00%	826	48.73%	869	51.27%
1916	801	44.95%	905	50.79%	76	4.26%
1920	1,511	61.08%	655	26.48%	308	12.45%
1924	1,727	54.00%	690	21.58%	781	24.42%
1928	2,430	63.26%	1,397	36.37%	14	0.36%
1932	1,394	33.96%	2,658	64.75%	53	1.29%
1936	1,289	39.82%	1,721	53.17%	227	7.01%
1940	2,002	55.46%	1,608	44.54%	0	0.00%
1944	1,558	57.62%	1,146	42.38%	0	0.00%
1948	1,402	50.47%	1,367	49.21%	9	0.32%
1952	2,262	70.71%	937	29.29%	0	0.00%
1956	1,804	55.39%	1,453	44.61%	0	0.00%
1960	1,872	57.27%	1,397	42.73%	0	0.00%
1964	1,466	48.40%	1,563	51.60%	0	0.00%
1968	1,650	54.78%	1,136	37.72%	226	7.50%
1972	1,806	57.90%	1,307	41.90%	6	0.19%
1976	1,510	50.43%	1,477	49.33%	7	0.23%
1980	2,066	67.38%	803	26.19%	197	6.43%
1984	2,030	70.34%	846	29.31%	10	0.35%
1988	1,461	56.67%	1,101	42.71%	16	0.62%
1992	1,130	44.38%	785	30.83%	631	24.78%
1996	1,187	52.34%	803	35.41%	278	12.26%
2000	1,419	69.87%	565	27.82%	47	2.31%
2004	1,482	67.76%	668	30.54%	37	1.69%
2008	1,247	62.01%	718	35.70%	46	2.29%
2012	1,242	67.21%	575	31.11%	31	1.68%
2016	1,391	76.51%	334	18.37%	93	5.12%
2020	1,433	78.05%	373	20.32%	30	1.63%
2024	1,376	78.00%	365	20.69%	23	1.30%

== See also ==
- National Register of Historic Places listings in Hand County, South Dakota
- Titan Wind Project
