= Faulkton, South Dakota =

- City
- Motto: "The Carousel City"
- Location in Faulk County and the state of South Dakota
- Coordinates: 45°02′03″N 99°07′36″W
- Country: United States
- State: South Dakota
- County: Faulk
- Platted: 1886

Area
  - Total: 1.01 sq mi (2.62 km^{2})
  - Land: 1.01 sq mi (2.62 km^{2})
  - Water: 0 sq mi (0.00 km^{2})
- Elevation: 1,588 ft (484 m)

Population (2020)
  - Total: 826
  - Density: 815.4/sq mi (314.81/km^{2})
- Time zone: UTC-6 (Central (CST))
  - Summer (DST): UTC-5 (CDT)
- ZIP code: 57438
- Area code: 605
- FIPS code: 46-21260
- GNIS feature ID: 1267390
- Website: www.faulktonsd.com

Faulkton is a city in and county seat of Faulk County, South Dakota, United States. The population was 826 at the 2020 census. The city's nickname is "The Carousel City".

== History ==
Faulkton was platted and incorporated in 1886. It was named for Andrew Jackson Faulk, the third Governor of Dakota Territory.

== Geography ==
According to the United States Census Bureau, the city has a total area of 1.01 square miles (2.62 km^{2}), all land.

=== Climate ===
Climate data for Faulkton 1 NW, South Dakota (1991−2020 normals, extremes 1893−present)
| Month | Jan | Feb | Mar | Apr | May | Jun | Jul | Aug | Sep | Oct | Nov | Dec | Year |
|---|---|---|---|---|---|---|---|---|---|---|---|---|---|
| Record high °F (°C) | 66 (19) | 71 (22) | 86 (30) | 98 (37) | 109 (43) | 111 (44) | 114 (46) | 113 (45) | 106 (41) | 96 (36) | 82 (28) | 68 (20) | 114 (46) |
| Mean daily maximum °F (°C) | 24.0 (−4.4) | 28.7 (−1.8) | 41.1 (5.1) | 56.1 (13.4) | 68.3 (20.2) | 78.5 (25.8) | 84.5 (29.2) | 83.1 (28.4) | 74.4 (23.6) | 58.7 (14.8) | 42.3 (5.7) | 28.8 (−1.8) | 55.7 (13.2) |
| Daily mean °F (°C) | 14.2 (−9.9) | 18.4 (−7.6) | 30.1 (−1.1) | 43.6 (6.4) | 56.0 (13.3) | 66.2 (19.0) | 71.6 (22.0) | 69.8 (21.0) | 60.8 (16.0) | 46.3 (7.9) | 31.5 (−0.3) | 19.4 (−7.0) | 44.0 (6.7) |
| Mean daily minimum °F (°C) | 4.4 (−15.3) | 8.0 (−13.3) | 19.2 (−7.1) | 31.1 (−0.5) | 43.6 (6.4) | 54.1 (12.3) | 58.6 (14.8) | 56.6 (13.7) | 47.3 (8.5) | 33.9 (1.1) | 20.6 (−6.3) | 10.0 (−12.2) | 32.3 (0.2) |
| Record low °F (°C) | −41 (−41) | −39 (−39) | −28 (−33) | −7 (−22) | 14 (−10) | 29 (−2) | 35 (2) | 33 (1) | 15 (−9) | −8 (−22) | −25 (−32) | −35 (−37) | −41 (−41) |
| Average precipitation inches (mm) | 0.67 (17) | 0.80 (20) | 1.02 (26) | 2.02 (51) | 3.24 (82) | 3.59 (91) | 2.74 (70) | 2.67 (68) | 2.04 (52) | 1.86 (47) | 0.78 (20) | 0.57 (14) | 22.00 (559) |
| Average snowfall inches (cm) | 7.6 (19) | 9.3 (24) | 6.8 (17) | 7.1 (18) | 0.0 (0.0) | 0.0 (0.0) | 0.0 (0.0) | 0.0 (0.0) | 0.0 (0.0) | 0.9 (2.3) | 3.4 (8.6) | 8.6 (22) | 43.7 (111) |
| Average precipitation days (≥ 0.01 in) | 5.5 | 5.3 | 5.3 | 7.9 | 11.0 | 11.7 | 8.8 | 8.3 | 7.6 | 7.0 | 4.6 | 4.9 | 87.9 |
| Average snowy days (≥ 0.1 in) | 4.0 | 3.5 | 2.0 | 1.6 | 0.0 | 0.0 | 0.0 | 0.0 | 0.0 | 0.6 | 2.1 | 3.3 | 17.1 |
Source: NOAA

== Demographics ==
Historical population
| Census | Pop. | Note | %± |
|---|---|---|---|
| 1890 | 462 | | — |
| 1900 | 539 | | 16.7% |
| 1910 | 802 | | 48.8% |
| 1920 | 709 | | −11.6% |
| 1930 | 739 | | 4.2% |
| 1940 | 747 | | 1.1% |
| 1950 | 837 | | 12.0% |
| 1960 | 1,051 | | 25.6% |
| 1970 | 955 | | −9.1% |
| 1980 | 981 | | 2.7% |
| 1990 | 809 | | −17.5% |
| 2000 | 785 | | −3.0% |
| 2010 | 736 | | −6.2% |
| 2020 | 826 | | 12.2% |
U.S. Decennial Census

=== 2020 census ===
As of the 2020 census, Faulkton had a population of 826. The median age was 49.3 years. 22.6% of residents were under the age of 18 and 36.3% of residents were 65 years of age or older. For every 100 females there were 85.2 males, and for every 100 females age 18 and over there were 84.7 males age 18 and over.

0.0% of residents lived in urban areas, while 100.0% lived in rural areas.

There were 299 households in Faulkton, of which 28.1% had children under the age of 18 living in them. Of all households, 50.8% were married-couple households, 20.4% were households with a male householder and no spouse or partner present, and 24.7% were households with a female householder and no spouse or partner present. About 38.4% of all households were made up of individuals and 25.1% had someone living alone who was 65 years of age or older.

There were 390 housing units, of which 23.3% were vacant. The homeowner vacancy rate was 2.7% and the rental vacancy rate was 26.1%.

Racial composition as of the 2020 census
| Race | Number | Percent |
|---|---|---|
| White | 756 | 91.5% |
| Black or African American | 1 | 0.1% |
| American Indian and Alaska Native | 44 | 5.3% |
| Asian | 0 | 0.0% |
| Native Hawaiian and Other Pacific Islander | 0 | 0.0% |
| Some other race | 4 | 0.5% |
| Two or more races | 21 | 2.5% |
| Hispanic or Latino (of any race) | 17 | 2.1% |

=== 2010 census ===
As of the census of 2010, there were 736 people, 355 households, and 182 families residing in the city. The population density was 728.7 inhabitants per square mile (281.4/km^{2}). There were 418 housing units at an average density of 413.9 per square mile (159.8/km^{2}). The racial makeup of the city was 97.1% White, 0.4% African American, 0.4% Native American, 0.1% Asian, 0.1% from other races, and 1.8% from two or more races. Hispanic or Latino of any race were 1.8% of the population.

There were 355 households, of which 18.9% had children under the age of 18 living with them, 42.8% were married couples living together, 6.2% had a female householder with no husband present, 2.3% had a male householder with no wife present, and 48.7% were non-families. 45.6% of all households were made up of individuals, and 29% had someone living alone who was 65 years of age or older. The average household size was 1.97 and the average family size was 2.74.

The median age in the city was 53.4 years. 18.5% of residents were under the age of 18; 5% were between the ages of 18 and 24; 16.1% were from 25 to 44; 26.3% were from 45 to 64; and 34.1% were 65 years of age or older. The gender makeup of the city was 43.8% male and 56.3% female.

=== 2000 census ===
As of the census of 2000, there were 785 people, 369 households, and 208 families residing in the city. The population density was 749.4 inhabitants per square mile (289.3/km^{2}). There were 413 housing units at an average density of 394.3 per square mile (152.2/km^{2}). The racial makeup of the city was 99.62% White, and 0.38% from two or more races. Hispanic or Latino of any race were 0.13% of the population.

There were 369 households, out of which 21.1% had children under the age of 18 living with them, 48.0% were married couples living together, 5.4% had a female householder with no husband present, and 43.6% were non-families. 42.5% of all households were made up of individuals, and 26.0% had someone living alone who was 65 years of age or older. The average household size was 2.00 and the average family size was 2.72.

In the city, the population was spread out, with 18.9% under the age of 18, 4.2% from 18 to 24, 19.1% from 25 to 44, 22.3% from 45 to 64, and 35.5% who were 65 years of age or older. The median age was 51 years. For every 100 females, there were 83.4 males. For every 100 females age 18 and over, there were 80.5 males.

The median income for a household in the city was $29,853, and the median income for a family was $37,750. Males had a median income of $27,344 versus $16,538 for females. The per capita income for the city was $19,504. About 2.4% of families and 5.6% of the population were below the poverty line, including 3.3% of those under age 18 and 8.5% of those age 65 or over.

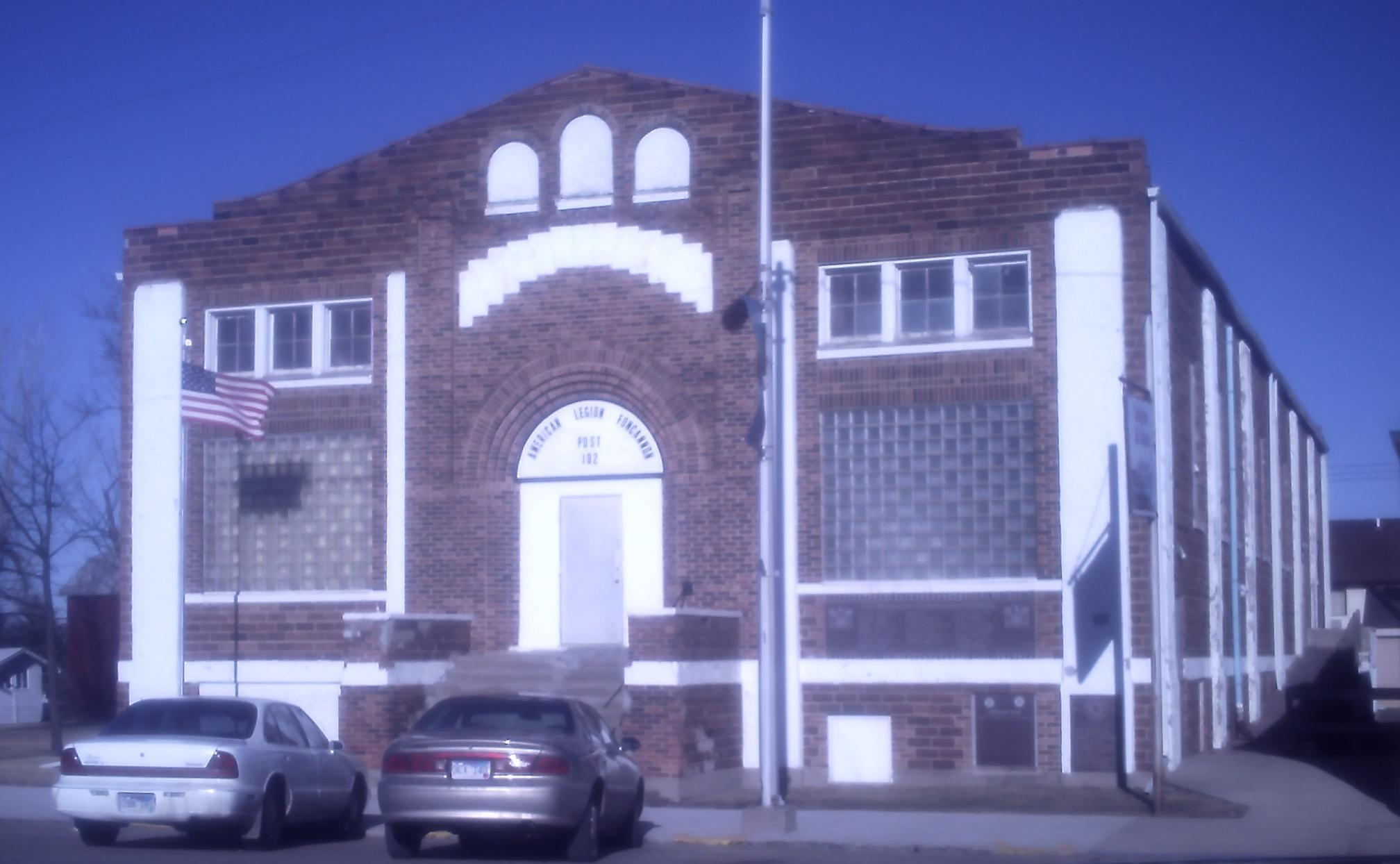
Faulkton American Legion Hall, a building on the NRHP, September 2015

== Notable people ==
- Joseph H. Bottum, 27th lieutenant governor of South Dakota and a member of the United States Senate; born in Faulkton.
- Frank M. Byrne- eighth governor of South Dakota
- Cecil E. Harris, United States Navy aviator
- John Pickler- United States House of Representatives from South Dakota and South Dakota's first congressman.

== See also ==
- List of cities in South Dakota
