= List of United States tornadoes from July to August 2011 =

This is a list of all tornadoes that were confirmed by local offices of the National Weather Service in the United States from July to August 2011.

== United States yearly total ==
Confirmed tornadoes by Enhanced Fujita rating
EFU	EF0	EF1	EF2	EF3	EF4	EF5	Total
0	802	629	199	62	17	6	1,715

== July ==
Confirmed tornadoes by Enhanced Fujita rating
EFU	EF0	EF1	EF2	EF3	EF4	EF5	Total
0	74	21	5	1	0	0	101

=== July 1 event ===
List of reported tornadoes - Friday, July 1, 2011
EF#	Location	County	Coord.	Time (UTC)	Path length	Comments/Damage
South Dakota
EF0	SE of Nisland	Butte	44.63°N 103.50°W	1855	unknown	Brief tornado touchdown with no damage.
Minnesota
EF1	Ruthton area	Pipestone	44.18°N 96.10°W	2050	4 miles (6.4 km)	Several garages were damaged, one of them removed from its foundation. Minor damage elsewhere in town. Tornado embedded in the start of a major derecho event.
EF2	Tyler area	Lincoln	44.28°N 96.14°W	2057	3 miles (4.8 km)	Several houses were heavily damaged, outbuildings were destroyed, and trees were snapped or uprooted with some debarking.
EF1	N of Milroy	Redwood	44.51°N 95.58°W	2131	2.6 miles (4.2 km)	Trees were snapped and a grain bin was heavily damaged.
EF1	W of Vesta	Redwood, Yellow Medicine, Renville	44.51°N 95.54°W	2131	20 miles (32 km)	Hundreds of trees were snapped or uprooted, some of which fell on houses. Several outbuildings were heavily damaged.
EF1	NW of Danube	Renville	44.80°N 95.12°W	2203	2.5 miles (4.0 km)	A house had much of its roof lifted off and a large equipment shed was nearly destroyed.
EF0	WSW of St. Cloud	Stearns	45.52°N 94.27°W	2323	2.3 miles (3.7 km)	Weak tornado downed dozens of trees along an intermittent track.
Wisconsin
EF2	SW of Solon Springs	Douglas	46.32°N 91.87°W	0051	2.9 miles (4.7 km)	Several homes and businesses were damaged, a few of which collapsed, and numerous trees were snapped or uprooted. A few people were injured by the tornado.
Sources: SPC Storm Reports for 07/01/11 NWS Sioux Falls, NWS Duluth, NWS Twin Cities, NCDC Storm Data

=== July 2 event ===
List of reported tornadoes - Saturday, July 2, 2011
EF#	Location	County	Coord.	Time (UTC)	Path length	Comments/Damage
Colorado
EF0	SW of Akron (1st tornado)	Washington	40.15°N 103.20°W	2311	unknown	Brief tornado touchdown with no damage.
EF0	SW of Akron (2nd tornado)	Washington	40.15°N 103.20°W	2338	unknown	Brief tornado touchdown with no damage.
Kansas
EF0	SSW of Moundridge	McPherson	38.16°N 97.53°W	0003	1 mile (1.6 km)	Brief landspout tornado with no damage.
Wyoming
EF0	NE of Fort Laramie	Goshen	42.28°N 104.42°W	0047	unknown	Brief tornado touchdown with no damage.
EF0	Lingle	Goshen	42.12°N 104.35°W	0100	unknown	Damage limited to a dumpster being lifted and thrown.
EF0	S of Torrington	Goshen	42.03°N 104.16°W	0118	unknown	Brief tornado touchdown with no damage.
EF0	E of Huntley	Goshen	41.92°N 104.07°W	0137	unknown	Brief tornado touchdown with no damage.
Sources: NCDC Storm Data

=== July 4 event ===
List of reported tornadoes - Monday, July 4, 2011
EF#	Location	County	Coord.	Time (UTC)	Path length	Comments/Damage
Minnesota
EF0	NW of Humboldt	Kittson	48.96°N 97.15°W	2208	2 miles (3.2 km)	Several trees were knocked down.
EF0	NNW of Gentilly	Polk	47.79°N 96.40°W	0105	1 mile (1.6 km)	Three trees were partially uprooted and some large tree limbs were broken.
EF0	NNW of Shelly	Norman	47.48°N 96.76°W	0155	1.5 miles (2.4 km)	Mature maple trees were snapped.
North Dakota
EF0	Pembina	Pembina	48.97°N 97.26°W	2157	2 miles (3.2 km)	Several trees were damaged in town.
EF1	W of Kelso	Traill	47.30°N 97.10°W	0215	1 mile (1.6 km)	Minor damage to a house, mainly the eaves and shingles. A solar collector was also damaged.
EF0	W of Grandin	Cass	47.24°N 97.04°W	0226	4 miles (6.4 km)	Shelterbelts were damaged.
EF2	NW of Mapleton	Cass	46.94°N 97.13°W	0259	2.75 miles (4.43 km)	Power lines were blown down, sheds and barns were destroyed, and one house lost its roof.
Sources: SPC Storm Reports for 07/04/11 NWS Grand Forks, NCDC Storm Data

=== July 5 event ===
List of reported tornadoes - Tuesday, July 5, 2011
EF#	Location	County	Coord.	Time (UTC)	Path length	Comments/Damage
Minnesota
EF0	E of East Bethel	Anoka	45.30°N 93.16°W	2245	unknown	Brief tornado damaged a boat and a dock on Coon Lake.
Sources: NCDC Storm Data

=== July 6 event ===
List of reported tornadoes - Wednesday, July 6, 2011
EF#	Location	County	Coord.	Time (UTC)	Path length	Comments/Damage
Colorado
EF0	WSW of Byers	Arapahoe	39.66°N 104.41°W	2322	unknown	Brief landspout tornado with no damage.
Sources: NCDC Storm Data

=== July 7 event ===
List of reported tornadoes - Thursday, July 7, 2011
EF#	Location	County	Coord.	Time (UTC)	Path length	Comments/Damage
Florida
EF0	SSE of Zephyrhills	Pasco	28.21°N 82.16°W	2105	unknown	Brief tornado caused minor damage to manufactured homes.
Sources: SPC Storm Reports for 07/07/11, NCDC Storm Data

=== July 8 event ===
List of reported tornadoes - Friday, July 8, 2011
EF#	Location	County	Coord.	Time (UTC)	Path length	Comments/Damage
North Dakota
EF0	N of Emerson	Dunn	47.10°N 102.76°W	2235	2 miles (3.2 km)	Tornado remained over open country.
EF0	N of Golden Valley	Mercer	47.29°N 102.11°W	2243	3 miles (4.8 km)	Tornado remained over open country.
EF0	N of Beulah	Mercer	47.27°N 101.79°W	2302	3 miles (4.8 km)	Tornado confirmed by law enforcement remained over open country.
EF0	SSW of Fort Rice	Morton	46.42°N 100.63°W	2338	unknown	Brief tornado touchdown with no damage.
EF0	N of Underwood	McLean	47.47°N 101.13°W	2359	unknown	Brief tornado touchdown with no damage.
EF0	N of Napoleon	Logan	46.50°N 99.76°W	0135	unknown	Brief tornado touchdown with no damage.
Sources: NCDC Storm Data

=== July 10 event ===
List of reported tornadoes - Sunday, July 10, 2011
EF#	Location	County	Coord.	Time (UTC)	Path length	Comments/Damage
North Dakota
EF2	SE of Napoleon	Logan	46.41°N 99.77°W	1940	12 miles (19 km)	Three farm houses were heavily damaged. Two large grain bins were destroyed and thrown considerable distances. Many trees were uprooted or snapped.
EF0	SW of Ashley	McIntosh	46.02°N 99.38°W	2034	1 mile (1.6 km)	Tornado touchdown in a field with no damage.
EF1	NW of Merricourt	Dickey	46.26°N 98.84°W	2048	100 yards (90 m)	Brief tornado caused significant damage to a farmstead and downed several trees.
EF0	Monango	Dickey	46.16°N 98.57°W	2104	unknown	Brief tornado touchdown with no damage.
EF0	SSW of Glover	Dickey	46.18°N 98.15°W	2135	unknown	Brief tornado touchdown with no damage.
EF2	Nicholson area	Sargent	46.10°N 97.94°W	2150	26 miles (42 km)	Numerous grain bins were damaged and trees and power poles were snapped or destroyed along the path, including transmission towers.
EF1	Delamere area	Sargent	46.26°N 97.41°W	2221	4 miles (6.4 km)	Numerous trees were snapped or uprooted.
EF1	SW of Stiles	Richland	46.02°N 97.09°W	2253	3 miles (4.8 km)	Several trees were snapped or uprooted.
Colorado
EF0	NNW of Cedarwood	Pueblo	38.05°N 104.72°W	1955	unknown	Brief tornado damaged a house and destroyed a carport.
Minnesota
EF0	NNE of Atwater	Kandiyohi	45.21°N 94.76°W	0147	220 yards (200 m)	Brief tornado with damage limited to a few crops.
Sources: SPC Storm Reports for 07/10/11, NWS Bismarck, NWS Pueblo, NCDC Storm Data

=== July 11 event ===
List of confirmed tornadoes – Monday, July 11, 2011 (Note: All dates are based on the local time zone where the tornado touched down; however, all times are in Coordinated Universal Time for consistency.)
EF#	Location	County / Parish	State	Start Coord.	Time (UTC)	Path length	Max width	Summary
EF0	SE of Moorland	Webster	IA	42.42°N 94.28°W	07:52–07:56	2.21 miles (3.56 km)	50 yards (46 m)	Intermittent tornado touchdown with damage to crops.

=== July 12 event ===
List of reported tornadoes - Tuesday, July 12, 2011
EF#	Location	County	Coord.	Time (UTC)	Path length	Comments/Damage
Colorado
EF0	W of Cedar Point	Elbert	39°22′N 104°04′W	0124	unknown	Brief tornado downed 20 trees.
EF0	Fondis area	Elbert	39°13′N 104°27′W	0211	unknown	Brief tornado with no damage.
Sources: NCDC Storm Events Database

=== July 13 event ===
List of reported tornadoes - Wednesday, July 13, 2011
EF#	Location	County	Coord.	Time (UTC)	Path length	Comments/Damage
New Mexico
EF0	W of Strauss	Doña Ana	31°52′N 106°45′W	2146	unknown	Brief landspout tornado with no damage.
Nebraska
EF0	SW of Upland	Franklin	40°16′N 98°57′W	0143	unknown	Brief tornado with no damage.
EF0	SE of Upland	Franklin	40°16′N 98°49′W	0206	unknown	Brief tornado with no damage.
Sources: NCDC Storm Events Database

=== July 14 event ===
List of reported tornadoes - Thursday, July 14, 2011
EF#	Location	County	Coord.	Time (UTC)	Path length	Comments/Damage
Nebraska
EF0	NE of Harrisburg	Banner	41°42′N 103°29′W	2310	unknown	Brief tornado with no damage.
Sources: NCDC Storm Events Database

=== July 15 event ===
List of reported tornadoes - Friday, July 15, 2011
EF#	Location	County	Coord.	Time (UTC)	Path length	Comments/Damage
North Dakota
EF1	Valley City area	Barnes	46°55′N 98°01′W	0840	3 miles (4.8 km)	A rain-wrapped tornado, accompanied by a downburst, passed through northern portions of Valley City. Numerous large trees were snapped or uprooted across the town.
Minnesota
EF1	ESE of Breckenridge	Wilkin	46°15′N 96°31′W	1032	1 mile (1.6 km)	Some large trees were knocked down, a number of large branches were broken off and a few shingles were lifted off the house. A metal dumpster was thrown about 100 ft (30 m).
Sources: NCDC Storm Events Database

=== July 16 event ===
List of reported tornadoes - Saturday, July 16, 2011
EF#	Location	County	Coord.	Time (UTC)	Path length	Comments/Damage
North Dakota
EF1	N of Regan	Burleigh, Sheridan	47°16′N 100°31′W	2235	6 miles (9.7 km)	Several large trees, including one that was 2.5 ft (0 m) in diameter, were snapped or uprooted.
EF1	S of Revere	Griggs	47°16′N 98°19′W	0010	1 mile (1.6 km)	Several trees were snapped or uprooted and part of a cornfield was flattened.
EF1	E of Revere	Griggs	47°21′N 98°18′W	0020	1 mile (1.6 km)	Several trees were snapped or uprooted and part of a cornfield was flattened. A shed also had a portion of its roof torn off.
EF0	SSW of Bowdon	Wells	47°21′N 99°39′W	0031	6 miles (9.7 km)	Tornado tracked over open country.
EF0	S of Bowdon	Wells	47°23′N 99°34′W	0038	1 mile (1.6 km)	Tornado tracked over open country.
EF0	SSW of Minnewaukan	Benson	48°01′N 99°16′W	0051	3 miles (4.8 km)	Tornado tracked over a lake before dissipating.
EF0	NW of Fort Totten	Benson	48°01′N 99°03′W	0118	3 miles (4.8 km)	Tornado tracked intermittently over a lake before dissipating.
EF0	ESE of Linton	Emmons	46°15′N 100°04′W	0247	2 miles (3.2 km)	Tree and crop damage was reported at two farmsteads.
EF0	S of Doyon	Ramsey	47°54′N 98°32′W	0248	unknown	Brief tornado with no damage.
Minnesota
EF1	NNE of Stephen	Marshall	48°31′N 96°50′W	0125	unknown	Brief tornado with no damage.
Sources: NCDC Storm Events Database

=== July 17 event ===
List of reported tornadoes - Sunday, July 17, 2011
EF#	Location	County	Coord.	Time (UTC)	Path length	Comments/Damage
North Dakota
EF0	NNE of Harvey	Wells	47°49′N 99°54′W	1648	unknown	Brief tornado with no damage.
EF1	S of New Rockford	Eddy	47°37′N 99°08′W	1809	1 mile (1.6 km)	Many trees were damaged in a shelter belt near U.S. Route 281. Several power poles were snapped as well.
EF0	W of Juanita	Foster	47°30′N 98°43′W	1842	1 mile (1.6 km)	Brief tornado with no damage.
EF0	SSE of Glenfield	Foster	47°21′N 98°32′W	1928	unknown	Brief tornado with no damage.
EF0	S of Sutton	Griggs	47°23′N 98°27′W	1935	5 miles (8.0 km)	Intermittent tornado downed several trees.
EF0	W of Hannaford	Griggs	47°20′N 98°15′W	2016	2 miles (3.2 km)	Several trees were downed.
EF0	SSW of Ayr	Cass	47°20′N 98°15′W	2223	1 mile (1.6 km)	Several trees were damaged and many tree limbs were tossed about.
EF3	SE of Nortonville	LaMoure	46°29′N 98°37′W	2257	16 miles (26 km)	Several farmhouses damaged, one of which was flattened, in the rural area. Many power poles and trees downed. One vehicle was tossed roughly 0.5 mi (0.80 km) and was almost unrecognizable when it was found. Numerous trees were twisted, snapped, or uprooted. One person was injured and several farm animals were killed. Tornado rated as a high-end EF3 with winds around 165 mph (266 km/h).
EF0	N of Fullerton	Dickey	46°12′N 98°25′W	0006	unknown	Brief tornado with no damage.
Sources: SPC Storm Reports for 07/17/2011 NWS Grand Forks, NWS Bismarck

=== July 18 event ===
List of reported tornadoes - Monday, July 18, 2011
EF#	Location	County	Coord.	Time (UTC)	Path length	Comments/Damage
South Dakota
EF1	SW of Reva	Harding	45°27′N 103°17′W	2136	10 miles (16 km)	Several trees and a tractor-trailer were blown over.
Colorado
EF0	NE of Towaoc	Montezuma	37°13′N 108°42′W	0240	unknown	Brief tornado snapped a few tree limbs.
Sources: NCDC Storm Events Database

=== July 19 event ===
List of reported tornadoes - Tuesday, July 19, 2011
EF#	Location	County	Coord.	Time (UTC)	Path length	Comments/Damage
Texas
EF0	W of Hondo	Medina	29°21′N 99°10′W	1939	unknown	Brief tornado with no damage.
Wisconsin
EF0	NNE of Range	Polk	45°31′N 92°13′W	0030	1 mile (1.6 km)	Brief tornado downed several dozen trees.
Sources: NCDC Storm Events Database

=== July 20 event ===
List of reported tornadoes - Wednesday, July 20, 2011
EF#	Location	County	Coord.	Time (UTC)	Path length	Comments/Damage
North Dakota
EF1	S of Rugby	Pierce	48°18′N 100°00′W	1150	1 mile (1.6 km)	Brief tornado damaged or destroyed several buildings.
Sources: NCDC Storm Events Database

=== July 22 event ===
List of reported tornadoes - Friday, July 22, 2011
EF#	Location	County	Coord.	Time (UTC)	Path length	Comments/Damage
North Dakota
EF0	SSW of Almont	Morton	46°37′N 101°34′W	2340	unknown	Brief tornado with no damage.
EF0	N of Grassy Butte	McKenzie	47°35′N 103°15′W	0023	unknown	Brief tornado downed a power line resulting in a traffic accident that injured two people.
EF0	SSW of Belfield	Stark	46°52′N 103°12′W	0035	unknown	Brief tornado with no damage.
EF0	SSW of South Heart	Stark	46°42′N 103°05′W	0105	2 miles (3.2 km)	Short-lived tornado with no damage.
EF0	NE of Glen Ullin	Morton	46°56′N 101°39′W	0310	1 mile (1.6 km)	Short-lived tornado with no damage.
Sources: NCDC Storm Events Database

=== July 23 event ===
List of reported tornadoes - Saturday, July 23, 2011
EF#	Location	County	Coord.	Time (UTC)	Path length	Comments/Damage
Indiana
EF0	NNW of Kentland	Newton	40°48′N 87°26′W	1839	unknown	Brief tornado with no damage.
Sources: NCDC Storm Events Database

=== July 24 event ===
List of reported tornadoes - Sunday, July 24, 2011
EF#	Location	County	Coord.	Time (UTC)	Path length	Comments/Damage
Minnesota
EF1	WNW of Espelie	Marshall	48°15′N 95°48′W	0012	3 miles (4.8 km)	Several trees were snapped or uprooted and a home lost part of its roof.
EF0	ESE of Rosewood	Marshall	48°11′N 96°15′W	0042	unknown	Brief tornado with no damage.
Arizona
EF0	N of Snowflake	Navajo	34°31′N 110°04′W	0050	1 mile (1.6 km)	Brief tornado with no damage.
Michigan
EF0	N of Sanford	Midland	43°44′N 84°24′W	0051	0.4 miles (0.64 km)	Damage confined to a boat hoist and several trees.
Sources: SPC Storm Reports for 07/26/2011 NWS Detroit

=== July 26 event ===
List of reported tornadoes - Tuesday, July 26, 2011
EF#	Location	County	Coord.	Time (UTC)	Path length	Comments/Damage
New York
EF0	NNW of Franklin Springs	Oneida	43°03′N 75°25′W	1655	1 mile (1.6 km)	Brief tornado uprooted one tree and snapped several others.
EF0	Chuckery Corners area	Oneida	43°01′N 75°20′W	1703	0.1 miles (160 m)	Several trees were snapped or uprooted.
Vermont
EF0	NNW of Colebrook, NH	Essex, Coos (NH)	44°54′N 71°30′W	2114	1 mile (1.6 km)	Brief tornado uprooted several trees.
South Dakota
EF0	ESE of Lowry	Walworth	45°16′N 99°43′W	0005	unknown	Brief tornado with no damage.
EF0	SE of Hoven	Potter	45°14′N 99°46′W	0015	unknown	Brief tornado damaged the roof of a business and downed several trees.
EF0	SE of Britton	Marshall	45°43′N 97°39′W	0140	1 mile (1.6 km)	Damage limited to trees.
Sources: SPC Storm Reports for 07/26/2011 NWS Binghamton

=== July 27 event ===
List of reported tornadoes - Wednesday, July 27, 2011
EF#	Location	County	Coord.	Time (UTC)	Path length	Comments/Damage
Illinois
EF0	NW of Galena	Jo Daviess	42°27′N 90°28′W	0018	0.1 miles (160 m)	Brief tornado with no damage.
EF0	NE of Stockton	Jo Daviess	42°22′N 89°57′W	0055	0.5 miles (800 m)	Brief tornado with no damage.
Sources: NCDC Storm Events Database

=== July 29 event ===
List of reported tornadoes - Friday, July 29, 2011
EF#	Location	County	Coord.	Time (UTC)	Path length	Comments/Damage
New York
EF0	ENE of Guilford	Chenango	42°24′N 75°26′W	2000	175 yards (160 m)	Brief tornado damaged a few sheds on a lake.
EF1	Goshen area	Orange	41°24′N 74°17′W	2059	5 miles (8.0 km)	Two homes sustained roof damage and many trees were snapped or uprooted
EF1	WSW of Burlington Flats	Otsego	42°44′N 75°11′W	2120	0.75 miles (1.21 km)	Two barns and a house were damaged. Numerous trees were snapped or uprooted.
Pennsylvania
EF1	WNW of Honesdale	Wayne	41°34′N 75°17′W	2044	0.7 miles (1.1 km)	First of two tornadoes in the area with many trees uprooted or snapped, some damaging houses.
EF0	Honesdale area	Wayne	41°33′N 75°15′W	2048	0.55 miles (890 m)	Second tornado to touch down near Honesdale. The local middle school sustained some damage.
Montana
EF0	NW of Enid	Richland	47°43′N 104°48′W	0128	11 miles (18 km)	Tornado embedded within an area of strait-line winds caused little damage.
Sources: SPC Storm Reports for 07/29/2011 NWS Binghamton

=== July 30 event ===
List of reported tornadoes - Saturday, July 30, 2011
EF#	Location	County	Coord.	Time (UTC)	Path length	Comments/Damage
Minnesota
EF0	ESE of Collis	Traverse	45°35′N 96°17′W	0011	unknown	Brief tornado damaged a corn field and uprooted several trees.
EF0	NNE of Gutches Grove	Todd	45°59′N 94°56′W	0013	1 mile (1.6 km)	Short-lived tornado downed two dozen trees.
EF0	NW of Dalbo	Mille Lacs, Isanti	45°43′N 93°31′W	0126	5 miles (8.0 km)	Two trailers and a garage were heavily damaged and numerous trees were snapped.
Sources: SPC Storm Reports for 07/30/2011 NWS Twin Cities

== August ==
Confirmed tornadoes by Enhanced Fujita rating
EFU	EF0	EF1	EF2	EF3	EF4	EF5	Total
0	46	8	4	1	0	0	59

=== August 2 event ===
List of reported tornadoes - Tuesday, August 2, 2011
EF#	Location	County	Coord.	Time (UTC)	Path length	Comments/Damage
Florida
EF1	E of Tamarac	Broward	26.21°N 80.24°W	2103	1 mile (1.6 km)	Brief tornado touched down over the western suburbs of the greater Fort Lauderdale metropolitan area. Several homes sustained roof damage and had windows blown out; one home had part its roof torn off.
Sources: SPC Storm Reports for 08/02/2011 NWS Miami-South Florida

=== August 3 event ===
List of reported tornadoes - Wednesday, August 3, 2011
EF#	Location	County	Coord.	Time (UTC)	Path length	Comments/Damage
New Mexico
EF0	SSW of Carnuel	Bernalillo	34°59′N 106°28′W	2136	unknown	Brief landspout.
Sources: NCDC Storm Events

=== August 5 event ===
List of reported tornadoes - Friday, August 5, 2011
EF#	Location	County	Coord.	Time (UTC)	Path length	Comments/Damage
Florida
EF0	Grand Island area	Lake	28°52′N 81°42′W	2336	unknown	A waterspout moved onshore near Grand Island and damaged three residences.
Sources: NCDC Storm Events

=== August 6 event ===
List of reported tornadoes - Saturday, August 6, 2011
EF#	Location	County	Coord.	Time (UTC)	Path length	Comments/Damage
North Carolina
EF0	SSE of Black Creek	Wilson	35.59°N 77.92°W	1525	3 miles (4.8 km)	7 mobile homes sustained minor damage. Four turkey houses were damaged or destroyed and a barn was heavily damaged.
Texas
EF0	WNW of Newlin	Hall	34°35′N 100°27′W	2030	unknown	Brief landspout.
Sources: NCDC Storm Events, NWS Raleigh, SPC Storm Reports for 08/06/11

=== August 7 event ===
List of reported tornadoes - Sunday, August 7, 2011
EF#	Location	County	Coord.	Time (UTC)	Path length	Comments/Damage
Michigan
EF0	Tawas City	Iosco	44.27°N 83.52°W	2050	0.2 miles (320 m)	Brief tornado damaged six houses and knocked down about 40 trees.
Puerto Rico
EF0	Barrio Cruz area	Moca	18°22′N 67°06′W	1735	0.8 miles (1.3 km)	Short-lived tornado damaged a few homes and snapped or uprooted several trees.
Sources: NCDC Event Reports, SPC Storm Reports for 08/07/2011, NWS Gaylord

=== August 8 event ===
List of reported tornadoes - Monday, August 8, 2011
EF#	Location	County	Coord.	Time (UTC)	Path length	Comments/Damage
Wisconsin
EF0	Madison	Dane	43.04°N 89.22°W	0013	1.24 miles (2.00 km)	Brief tornadic waterspout over Lake Monona.
Sources: NWS Milwaukee

=== August 9 event ===
List of reported tornadoes - Tuesday, August 9, 2011
EF#	Location	County	Coord.	Time (UTC)	Path length	Comments/Damage
New Jersey
EF0	Bergen Mills	Monmouth	40.25°N 74.43°W	1830	0.5 miles (800 m)	Tornado damaged a flagpole and downed several trees.
Michigan
EF0	WNW of Galloway	Gratiot	43°20′N 84°23′W	1905	250 yards (230 m)	Brief tornado caused significant damage to a farm.
EF0	WSW of Lakefield	Saginaw	43°20′N 84°22′W	1908	200 yards (180 m)	Brief tornado caused minor crop damage.
Montana
EF0	NW of Wilsall	Park	46°01′N 110°42′W	2045	unknown	Brief landspout.
Sources: NCDC Storm Events, SPC Storm Reports for 08/09/2011, NWS Philadelphia/Mount Holly

=== August 10 event ===
List of reported tornadoes - Wednesday, August 10, 2011
EF#	Location	County	Coord.	Time (UTC)	Path length	Comments/Damage
Oklahoma
EF2	SE of Locust Grove	Mayes, Cherokee	36.15°N 95.10°W	0832	6 miles (9.7 km)	1 death – A double-wide mobile home was destroyed (where the fatality occurred) and two other mobile homes were heavily damaged. A garage and a workshop were also destroyed. Two others were injured. This was only the fourth strong (EF2 or EF3) tornado to touch down during August in eastern Oklahoma since 1950.
Nebraska
EF0	SE of Bushnell	Kimball	41°12′N 103°52′W	2200	1 mile (1.6 km)	Brief tornado with no damage.
Sources: NCDC Storm Events, SPC Storm Reports for 08/09/2011

=== August 11 event ===
List of reported tornadoes - Thursday, August 11, 2011
EF#	Location	County	Coord.	Time (UTC)	Path length	Comments/Damage
Michigan
EF0	NW of Sawyer International Airport	Marquette	46°35′N 87°38′W	1900	unknown	Brief tornado along the shore of the Dead River Basin.
Nebraska
EF0	WNW of Wood Lake (1st tornado)	Cherry	42°38′N 100°15′W	0049	unknown	Brief tornado with no damage.
EF0	NNE of Ainsworth Municipal Airport	Brown	42°39′N 99°55′W	0058	unknown	Brief tornado with no damage.
EF1	WNW of Wood Lake (2nd tornado)	Cherry	42°38′N 100°15′W	0100	1 mile (1.6 km)	Brief tornado destroyed a storage building.
EF3	SSE of Wood Lake	Cherry, Brown	42°33′N 100°12′W	0105	1 mile (1.6 km)	Half mile-wide tornado caused significant damage to two tree groves and three windmills. One tree was debarked, uprooted and moved. A steel culvert was tossed roughly 0.75 mi (1.21 km) from where it stood.
EF0	N of Johnstown	Brown	42°38′N 100°03′W	0122	unknown	Brief tornado with no damage.
EF0	S of Johnstown	Brown	42°22′N 100°00′W	0154	4 miles (6.4 km)	Two trees were twisted.
EF0	NNE of Halsey	Thomas	42°04′N 100°16′W	0253	unknown	Survey team confirmed that a tornado caused damage to several trees, power poles, and a fence.
Sources: SPC Storm Reports for 08/11/2011, NWS North Platte

=== August 14 event ===
List of reported tornadoes - Sunday, August 14, 2011
EF#	Location	County	Coord.	Time (UTC)	Path length	Comments/Damage
Texas
EF0	W of Hartburg	Newton	30°15′N 93°46′W	2119	unknown	Brief tornado snapped a few tree limbs.
South Dakota
EF0	WSW of Mahto	Corson	45°44′N 100°46′W	0135	unknown	Brief tornado with no damage.
EF0	ENE of Little Eagle	Corson	45°40′N 100°45′W	0155	unknown	Brief tornado with no damage.
Sources: NCDC Events Report

=== August 18 event ===
List of reported tornadoes - Thursday, August 18, 2011
EF#	Location	County	Coord.	Time (UTC)	Path length	Comments/Damage
North Carolina
EF0	Carolina Beach area	New Hanover	34°01′N 77°53′W	1415	0.3 miles (0.48 km)	Waterspout moved onshore and caused some damage before dissipating next to a lake.
EF0	NNW of Paynes Store	Alexander	35°54′N 81°08′W	2135	unknown	Brief tornado destroyed several outbuildings and pushed a manufactured home off its foundation.
Nebraska
EF0	N of Ewing	Holt	42°06′N 98°21′W	2223	unknown	Brief tornado with no damage.
EF0	W of Clearwater	Antelope	42°10′N 98°15′W	2246	1 mile (1.6 km)	Brief tornado caused little damage.
EF0	ESE of Ewing	Holt	42°15′N 98°19′W	2248	unknown	Brief tornado with no damage. Eye-witness reports indicated that it was a large, rain-wrapped tornado.
EF0	SW of Merritt Reservoir	Cherry	42°18′N 101°23′W	0040	unknown	Brief tornado with no damage.
Sources: SPC Storm Reports for 08/18/2011, NWS Wilmington

=== August 19 event ===
List of reported tornadoes - Friday, August 19, 2011
EF#	Location	County	Coord.	Time (UTC)	Path length	Comments/Damage
Michigan
EF0	ESE of Ontonagon	Ontonagon	46°52′N 89°19′W	1205	2 miles (3.2 km)	Trees were snapped and uprooted and snapped power lines. There was some minor roof damage.
EF0	WSW of Longrie	Menominee	45°21′N 87°53′W	2156	unknown	Brief tornado uprooted about a dozen trees.
Wisconsin
EF1	NW of Wausaukee	Marinette, Menominee (MI)	45°24′N 87°59′W	2145	7.8 miles (12.6 km)	1 death – Several structures were damaged and one trailer was completely destroyed. Hundreds of trees uprooted or snapped.
Sources: SPC Storm Reports for 08/19/2011, NWS Marquette, NWS Green Bay 1, 2

=== August 20 event ===
List of reported tornadoes - Saturday, August 20, 2011
EF#	Location	County	Coord.	Time (UTC)	Path length	Comments/Damage
Michigan
EF0	NNW of Chesaning	Saginaw	43.20°N 84.13°W	1500	3 miles (4.8 km)	Large trees were damaged and a trailer was overturned.
Sources: SPC Storm Reports for 08/20/2011 NWS Detroit

=== August 21 event ===
List of reported tornadoes - Sunday, August 21, 2011
EF#	Location	County	Coord.	Time (UTC)	Path length	Comments/Damage
New York
EF2	Conquest area	Wayne, Cayuga	43°04′N 76°47′W	1915	8 miles (13 km)	Two houses lost their roofs and entire trunks of large trees were snapped.
New Hampshire
EF1	NW of Grafton Center	Grafton	43.10°N 76.75°W	1945	2.7 miles (4.3 km)	Several hundred trees were snapped or uprooted. Multiple homes were damaged by fallen trees.
Sources: NWS Buffalo

=== August 23 event ===
List of reported tornadoes - Tuesday, August 23, 2011
EF#	Location	County	Coord.	Time (UTC)	Path length	Comments/Damage
Wisconsin
EF2	N of Chili	Clark	44°41′N 90°28′W	2205	8 miles (13 km)	One house was blown of its foundation, barns were damaged or destroyed, and trees and power lines were knocked down. Two people suffered minor injuries.
EF0	Arpin area	Wood	44°33′N 90°01′W	2258	unknown	Brief tornado touched down in a corn field and tossed a few stalks.
EF0	SSE of Briarton	Shawano	44°35′N 88°24′W	2356	unknown	Brief tornado snapped a few trees.
EF0	ENE of Sherwood	Calumet	44°10′N 88°15′W	0205	1 mile (1.6 km)	Brief tornado damaged two barns.
Sources: SPC Storm Reports for 08/23/2011 NWS La Crosse, NWS Green Bay

=== August 24 event ===
List of reported tornadoes - Wednesday, August 24, 2011
EF#	Location	County	Coord.	Time (UTC)	Path length	Comments/Damage
Colorado
EF0	SSW of Pinon	Pueblo	38°22′N 104°37′W	2024	unknown	Brief landspout.
Utah
EF0	SW of Grafton	Washington	37°05′N 113°10′W	2215	1 mile (1.6 km)	Brief tornado with no damage.
Ohio
EF1	NW of Scotland	Geauga	41°31′N 82°21′W	0440	3 miles (4.8 km)	Several homes and businesses sustained roof and siding damage. Dozens of trees were also felled.
Sources: NCDC Storm Events Database

=== August 25 event ===
List of reported tornadoes - Thursday, August 25, 2011
EF#	Location	County	Coord.	Time (UTC)	Path length	Comments/Damage
Texas
EF0	NNW of Magnolia Beach	Calhoun	28°34′N 96°33′W	1825	unknown	Brief tornado damaged several homes.
EF0	E of Wolfforth	Lubbock	33°30′N 101°57′W	2130	unknown	Brief landspout.
Maryland
EF0	NNW of California	St. Mary's	38°18′N 76°33′W	2158	3 miles (4.8 km)	Tornado damaged trees and a flag pole.
EF0	WNW of Patuxent River	St. Mary's	38°16′N 76°24′W	2211	unknown	Brief tornado with no damage.
Sources: NCDC Storm Events Database

=== August 26 event ===
- The events in North Carolina were related to Hurricane Irene.

List of reported tornadoes - Friday, August 26, 2011
EF#	Location	County	Coord.	Time (UTC)	Path length	Comments/Damage
Colorado
EF0	WSW of Fort Carson	El Paso	38°43′N 104°49′W	1945	unknown	Brief tornado with no damage.
North Carolina
EF1	N of Belhaven	Beaufort	35.55°N 76.55°W	0212	4.4 miles (7.1 km)	A car dealership was damaged and numerous pine trees were snapped. A utility trailer was also overturned.
EF1	Creswell area	Washington	35.88°N 76.24°W	0255	0.5 miles (800 m)	Brief tornado damaged a grain bin and a hardware store.
EF2	E of Columbia	Tyrrell	35.92°N 76.24°W	0355	0.5 miles (800 m)	Several manufactured homes were destroyed with their undercarriages mangled.
Sources: NWS Newport/Morehead City

=== August 27 event ===
- The events in Delaware and Virginia were related to Hurricane Irene.

List of reported tornadoes - Saturday, August 27, 2011
EF#	Location	County	Coord.	Time (UTC)	Path length	Comments/Damage
Virginia
EF0	NNW of Sandbridge Beach	Virginia Beach (city)	36.74°N 75.94°W	1249	unknown	Several houses were damaged by a brief tornado.
EF0	ENE of Chincoteague	Accomack	37°55′N 75°22′W	1530	unknown	Weak tornado caused minor tree and roof damage.
Delaware
EF1	ENE of Nassau	Sussex	38.763°N 75.165°W	2238	0.75 miles (1.21 km)	Numerous trees were snapped or uprooted and one home had substantial roof damage.
Sources: SPC Storm Reports for 08/27/2011

=== August 28 event ===
- The events in New Jersey and New York were related to Hurricane Irene.

List of reported tornadoes - Sunday, August 28, 2011
EF#	Location	County	Coord.	Time (UTC)	Path length	Comments/Damage
New Jersey
EF0	Robbinsville area	Mercer	40.23°N 74.54°W	0700	0.6 miles (0.97 km)	Numerous trees and several power poles were felled.
New York
EF0	Queens area	Queens	40.73°N 73.76°W	0800	1 mile (1.6 km)	Brief touchdown.
EF0	West Islip area	Suffolk	40.70°N 73.32°W	0850	4 miles (6.4 km)	Weak tornado made several touchdowns along its path.
Sources: NWS Upton, NWS Mount Holly

=== August 29 event ===
List of reported tornadoes - Monday, August 29, 2011
EF#	Location	County	Coord.	Time (UTC)	Path length	Comments/Damage
Nebraska
EF0	S of Chadron	Dawes	42°45′N 103°00′W	2210	0.6 miles (0.97 km)	Brief tornado damaged a trees and a windmill.
Sources: NCDC Storm Events Database

== See also ==
- Tornadoes of 2011
- List of United States tornadoes in June 2011
- List of United States tornadoes from September to October 2011
