= List of United States tornadoes in June 2011 =

This is a list of all tornadoes that were confirmed by local offices of the National Weather Service in the United States in June 2011.

== United States yearly total ==
Confirmed tornadoes by Enhanced Fujita rating
EFU	EF0	EF1	EF2	EF3	EF4	EF5	Total
0	802	629	199	62	17	6	1,721

== June ==
Confirmed tornadoes by Enhanced Fujita rating
EFU	EF0	EF1	EF2	EF3	EF4	EF5	Total
0	99	41	10	6	0	0	156

=== June 1 event ===
List of confirmed tornadoes – Wednesday June 1, 2011 (Note: All dates are based on the local time zone where the tornado touched down; however, all times are in Coordinated Universal Time for consistency.)
EF#	Location	County / Parish	State	Start Coord.	Time (UTC)	Path length	Max width
EF1	ESE of Bethel	Oxford	ME	44.4038°N 70.6817°W	19:35–19:36	0.26 mi (420 m)	25 yd (23 m)
EF1	A brief tornado touched down to the northwest of Bryant Pond, snapping or uprooting numerous trees. Tree limbs were thrown up to 0.5 miles (0.80 km) away.						
EF3	S of Westfield to Downtown Springfield to SSW of Charlton	Hampden, Worcester	MA	42.100°N 72.750°W	20:17–21:27	37.58 mi (60.48 km)	880 yd (800 m)
EF3	3 deaths – See section on this tornado – 200 people were injured.						
EF1	S of New Portland to S of Embden	Somerset	ME	44.9087°N 70.0273°W	21:51–22:06	8.38 mi (13.49 km)	200 yd (180 m)
EF1	Hundreds of trees were snapped or uprooted, and several buildings, along with at least one vehicle, were damaged. Winds were estimated at 90 to 100 mph (140 to 160 km/h).						
EF1	Wilbraham	Hampden	MA	42.140°N 72.480°W	22:32–22:40	4.16 mi (6.69 km)	200 yd (180 m)
EF1	Numerous trees were downed, and large limbs were snapped. Some trees fell onto homes and across roads.						
EF1	N of Brimfield	Hampden	MA	42.140°N 72.480°W	22:54–22:57	1.69 mi (2.72 km)	100 yd (91 m)
EF1	Numerous trees were snapped or uprooted.						
EF0	NE of Fiskdale	Worcester	MA	42.1541°N 72.0677°W	23:10–23:13	1.42 mi (2.29 km)	25 yd (23 m)
EF0	Numerous trees were downed in and just east of Wells State Park, one of which fell on and damaged a home.						
EF0	W of Lexington	Dawson	NE	40.7800°N 99.8191°W	23:22–23:23	0.1 mi (160 m)	15 yd (14 m)
EF0	A brief rope tornado with no damage.						
EF0	NNW of Barnard	Lincoln	KS	39.210°N 98.070°W	01:20–01:22	1.13 mi (1.82 km)	75 yd (69 m)
EF0	A brief tornado over open country with no damage.						
EF0	N of Yuba City	Sutter, Yuba	CA	39.1832°N 121.6719°W	01:30–01:33	5.13 mi (8.26 km)	10 yd (9.1 m)
EF0	The tornado was observed passing through peach and walnut groves, where a few trees were downed.						
EF0	N of Wilson Lake	Russell	KS	38.9534°N 98.5429°W	01:48–01:50	0.36 mi (580 m)	50 yd (46 m)
EF0	This brief tornado touched down in open pasture with no damage.						
EF0	E of Woodruff	Phillips	KS	39.9923°N 99.4065°W	02:40–02:44	0.46 mi (0.74 km)	20 yd (18 m)
EF0	A brief tornado tracked across open farmland with no damage.						
EF0	ENE of Smolan	Saline	KS	38.740°N 97.650°W	04:33–04:34	0.36 mi (580 m)	50 yd (46 m)
EF0	A brief touchdown over open country with no damage.						

=== June 3 event ===
List of confirmed tornadoes – Friday, June 3, 2011
EF#	Location	County / Parish	State	Start Coord.	Time (UTC)	Path length	Max width
EF1	WSW of Park River to E of Crystal to ESE of Hensel	Walsh, Pembina	ND	48.360°N 97.870°W	08:40–09:06	25.32 mi (40.75 km)	300 yd (270 m)
EF1	Many trees were snapped or uprooted, and the roof was torn off a pole barn.						

=== June 6 event ===
List of confirmed tornadoes – Monday, June 6, 2011
EF#	Location	County / Parish	State	Start Coord.	Time (UTC)	Path length	Max width
EF0	ESE of Molt	Yellowstone	MT	45.8369°N 108.8193°W	02:42–02:45	0.01 mi (16 m)	50 yd (46 m)
EF0	A brief tornado destroyed a grain bin, tossing it 50 feet (15 m) into an outbuilding, and caused minor siding damage to a nearby home.						
EF0	W of Shepherd	Yellowstone	MT	45.9384°N 108.4424°W	03:30–03:35	0.25 mi (400 m)	50 yd (46 m)
EF0	A brief tornado blew the roof off a garage and a shed and tossed debris into a nearby house, damaging windows and siding. Three power poles were damaged, and a horse trailer was flipped.						

=== June 7 event ===
List of confirmed tornadoes – Tuesday, June 7, 2011
EF#	Location	County / Parish	State	Start Coord.	Time (UTC)	Path length	Max width
EF0	WSW of Richardton	Stark	ND	46.8797°N 102.3376°W	22:24–22:27	0.25 mi (400 m)	30 yd (27 m)
EF0	Part of the roof was removed from an outbuilding.						

=== June 8 event ===
List of confirmed tornadoes – Wednesday, June 8, 2011
EF#	Location	County / Parish	State	Start Coord.	Time (UTC)	Path length	Max width
EF0	SE of Stockholm	Aroostook	ME	46.990°N 68.180°W	22:22–22:42	8.95 mi (14.40 km)	75 yd (69 m)
EF0	An intermittent tornado embedded in an area of straight-line winds downed numerous trees, destroyed a barn, and either damaged or destroyed several outbuildings.						
EF0	ENE of Ashland	Aroostook	ME	46.648°N 68.283°W	23:10–23:11	0.08 mi (130 m)	50 yd (46 m)
EF0	Numerous trees were downed.						
EF1	W of Verona to NNE of McFarland	Dane	WI	42.980°N 89.584°W	00:41–01:02	17.15 mi (27.60 km)	100 yd (91 m)
EF1	Sporadic damage occurred from Verona to the McFarland/Monona area. Numerous trees were downed on the south side of Verona, with a garage being crushed and three vehicles being damaged by falling trees. Several more trees and power lines were downed along the rest of the path.						

=== June 9 event ===
List of confirmed tornadoes – Thursday, June 9, 2011
EF#	Location	County / Parish	State	Start Coord.	Time (UTC)	Path length	Max width
EF0	NE of Fort Fairfield	Aroostook	ME	46.7983°N 67.8067°W	20:10–20:11	0.25 mi (400 m)	75 yd (69 m)
EF0	Several trees were downed by a brief tornado.						
EF1	Woodbury	Litchfield	CT	41.5321°N 73.2178°W	20:48	0.04 mi (64 m)	30 yd (27 m)
EF1	A brief tornado within a larger microburst area downed numerous trees.						
EF0	ENE of Andale	Sedgwick	KS	37.7952°N 97.5864°W	23:56–23:59	0.44 mi (710 m)	65 yd (59 m)
EF0	A tornado touched down briefly with no damage.						

=== June 10 event ===
List of confirmed tornadoes – Friday, June 10, 2011
EF#	Location	County / Parish	State	Start Coord.	Time (UTC)	Path length	Max width
EF0	WSW of Littleton	Schuyler	IL	40.2281°N 90.6340°W	00:05–00:06	0.23 mi (370 m)	10 yd (9.1 m)
EF0	A brief tornado in an open field with no damage.						

=== June 11 event ===
List of confirmed tornadoes – Saturday, June 11, 2011
EF#	Location	County / Parish	State	Start Coord.	Time (UTC)	Path length	Max width
EF0	S of Timpas	Otero	CO		1922	unknown	
EF0	A brief tornado touched down over an open field.						
EF0	NW of Kim	Las Animas	CO	37.43°N 103.58°W	2106	unknown	
EF0	A brief tornado touched down over an open field.						
EF0	Yoder area	Goshen	WY		2150	unknown	
EF0	Brief touchdown with no damage.						
EF0	W of Darrouzett	Lipscomb	TX		2349	0.5 miles (800 m)	
EF0	Brief tornado destroyed an outbuilding.						
EF0	NW of Follett	Lipscomb	TX		0050	300 yards (270 m)	
EF0	A brief tornado touched down over an open field.						
EF1	NE of Tyrone	Texas	OK		0011	2.1 miles (3.4 km)	
EF1	One home lost a portion of its roof and a manufactured home had its windows broken. Several outbuildings were also destroyed.						
EF0	N of Boyd	Beaver	OK		0050	unknown	
EF0	A brief tornado touched down over an open field.						
EF0	N of Shattuck	Ellis	OK		0130	2 miles (3.2 km)	
EF0	A home and several outbuildings were damaged. Trees and power lines were downed.						

=== June 12 event ===
List of confirmed tornadoes – Sunday, June 12, 2011
EF#	Location	County / Parish	State	Start Coord.	Time (UTC)	Path length	Max width
EF1	Windsor area	York	PA	39.91°N 76.57°W	1925	1.75 miles (2.82 km)	
EF1	A brief tornado felled about 50 trees and damaged six homes.						
EF0	NE of Springvale	York	PA	39.90°N 76.58°W	1930	0.75 miles (1.21 km)	
EF0	A brief tornado felled about 15 trees and damaged a few homes.						
EF0	N of Street	Harford	MD	39.674°N 76.375°W	2007	1.7 miles (2.7 km)	
EF0	A brief tornado snapped or uprooted numerous trees.						
EF0	Belcamp area	Harford	MD	39.474°N 76.234°W	2050	0.2 miles (320 m)	
EF0	A brief tornado snapped or uprooted more than three dozen trees on a historic property. Several large tree limbs were carried into nearby highways.						
EF0	NNE of Redbird (1st tornado)	Niobrara	WY		2058	unknown	
EF0	Law enforcement reported a brief touchdown with no damage.						
EF0	NNE of Redbird (2nd tornado)	Niobrara	WY		2130	unknown	
EF0	A brief touchdown was reported by a trained spotter. No damage was reported.						
EF0	SW of Mott	Hettinger	ND		2325	1 mile (1.6 km)	
EF0	Tornado touched down in open area with no damage.						
EF0	W of Redig	Harding	SD		2334	2 miles (3.2 km)	
EF0	A tornado with a width of only 10 yards (9.1 m) destroyed a barn, several calf shelters, and steel stockade walls. A few trees were damaged.						
EF1	SW of Albion	Carter	MT	45.16°N 104.31°W	2335	5 miles (8.0 km)	
EF1	Several grain bins were destroyed, a trailer was flipped, 50 to 60 trees and four power poles were snapped, and a mobile home sustained minor damage.						
EF2	SSW of Elgin	Grant	ND	46.30°N 101.91°W	0230	6 miles (9.7 km)	
EF2	A large, zero-point-five-mile (0.80 km) wide tornado damaged many farmsteads along its path. A few small outbuildings were destroyed while larger structures lost their roofs and in one instance, the walls collapsed. Debris from one farmstead was thrown into an open field roughly 2 miles (3.2 km) away.						
EF0	N of Judson	Morton	ND		0245	1 mile (1.6 km)	
EF0	Tornado touched down over open county with no damage.						
EF0	NNW of Judson	Morton	ND		0300	unknown	
EF0	Spotters reported a brief touchdown.						

=== June 13 event ===
List of confirmed tornadoes – Monday, June 13, 2011
EF#	Location	County / Parish	State	Start Coord.	Time (UTC)	Path length	Max width
EF1	E of Paragould	Greene	AR	36.50408°N 90.42047°W	1710	3.32 miles (5.34 km)	
EF1	An EF1 tornado severely damaged a single-wide mobile home, destroyed a steel carport and damaged several other structures. A business-sized storage building lost much of its roof and debris from this structure was found up to 1 mile (1.6 km) downstream in cornfields.						
EF0	N of Mullen	Cherry	NE	42.54°N 101.04°W	2347	unknown	
EF0	Brief rain-wrapped tornado.						
EF0	N of Luverne	Steele	ND	47.38°N 97.93°W	0000	unknown	
EF0	Brief touchdown with no damage.						

=== June 14 event ===
List of confirmed tornadoes – Tuesday, June 14, 2011
EF#	Location	County / Parish	State	Start Coord.	Time (UTC)	Path length	Max width
EF0	W of Okreek	Todd	SD		1852	unknown	
EF0	Brief touchdown with no damage.						
EF0	W of Miller	Hand	SD		2128	unknown	
EF0	Tornado touched down briefly with no damage.						
EF0	S of Miller	Hand	SD		2145	unknown	
EF0	Brief touchdown with no damage.						
EF0	WNW of Clarks	Merrick	NE	41.27°N 98.00°W	0110	1 mile (1.6 km)	
EF0	Brief touchdown with no damage.						
EF0	NNE of Brookfield	Linn, Macon	MO		0353	4 miles (6.4 km)	
EF0	Brief tornado damaged a few trees.						

=== June 15 event ===
List of confirmed tornadoes – Wednesday, June 15, 2011
EF#	Location	County / Parish	State	Start Coord.	Time (UTC)	Path length	Max width
EF0	E of Windsor	Shelby	IL		2025	unknown	
EF0	Brief tornado touchdown. No damage was reported.						
EF0	NE of Stewardson	Shelby	IL		2030	unknown	
EF0	Two cattle barns were damaged, thus killing two cows.						
EF0	E of South Holland	Cook	IL	41.60°N 87.58°W	2318	0.8 miles (1.3 km)	
EF0	Brief touchdown.						

=== June 16 event ===
List of confirmed tornadoes – Thursday, June 16, 2011
EF#	Location	County / Parish	State	Start Coord.	Time (UTC)	Path length	Max width
EF0	ENE of Dumas	Desha	AR	33.89°N 91.45°W	1849	0.3 miles (480 m)	
EF0	Landspout tornado in soybean fields lasted about 2 minutes.						
EF0	SE of Beeler	Ness	KS	38.34°N 100.07°W	2252	Unknown	
EF0	Brief tornado damaged a home and metal outbuilding						

=== June 17 event ===
List of confirmed tornadoes – Friday, June 17, 2011
EF#	Location	County / Parish	State	Start Coord.	Time (UTC)	Path length	Max width
EF0	NE of Eden	Marshall	SD		2328	1 mile (1.6 km)	
EF0	Brief touchdown with no damage.						
EF0	E of North Bend	Dodge	NE		2350	3 miles (4.8 km)	
EF0	Tornado was caught on video and only picked up dust.						

=== June 18 event ===
List of confirmed tornadoes – Saturday, June 18, 2011
EF#	Location	County / Parish	State	Start Coord.	Time (UTC)	Path length	Max width
EF0	W of Hulah	Osage	OK	36.93°N 96.16°W	0125		
EF0	Tornado lasted for 10 to 15 minutes over an open field, producing no known damage.						
EF0	E of Copan	Washington	OK	36.54°N 95.52°W	unknown		
EF0	Brief tornado remained over open country with no damage.						
EF0	E of Grainola	Osage	OK	36.57°N 96.33°W	unknown		
EF0	Brief tornado remained over open country with no damage.						
EF0	SW of Boulangerville	Osage	OK	36.55°N 96.17°W	unknown		
EF0	Brief tornado remained over open country with no damage.						
EF0	SE of Brighton	Polk, Greene	MO	37.42°N 93.32°W	0503	3 miles (4.8 km)	
EF0	A metal barn was destroyed, a home had minor siding damage and several trees were felled.						
EF1	NE of Everton	Dade, Greene	MO	37.22°N 93.37°W	0435	11 miles (18 km)	
EF1	Numerous trees were snapped and uprooted.						
EF1	SE of Dadeville	Dade, Polk	MO	37.27°N 93.37°W	Unknown	6 miles (9.7 km)	
EF1	Numerous trees were snapped and uprooted and outbuildings were destroyed.						
EF0	NE of Wild Horse	Cheyenne	CO	38.54°N 102.57°W	unknown	unknown	
EF0	Tornado remained over open fields with no damage.						
EF0	SW of Firstview	Cheyenne	CO	38.46°N 102.34°W	unknown	unknown	
EF0	Tornado remained over open fields with no damage.						
EF0	SW of Gove	Gove	KS	38.51°N 100.3°W	unknown	unknown	
EF0	Tornado remained over open fields with no damage.						
EF0	W of Mitchell	Scotts Bluff	NE	41.57°N 103.51°W	unknown	unknown	
EF0	Tornado remained over open fields with no damage.						

=== June 19 event ===
List of confirmed tornadoes – Sunday, June 19, 2011
EF#	Location	County / Parish	State	Start Coord.	Time (UTC)	Path length	Max width
EF0	W of Cherryville (1st tornado)	Crawford	MO		0700	0.75 miles (1.21 km)	
EF0	Extensive tree damage occurred.						
EF2	W of Cherryville (2nd tornado)	Crawford	MO		0710	3.1 miles (5.0 km)	
EF2	Numerous trees snapped and uprooted along the path. Two homes were also damaged, one of which lost a significant portion of its roof and parts of the walls. Support beams were found up to 0.75 miles (1.21 km) from the home. Three people inside the home sustained minor injuries.						
EF0	NW of Westboro	Atchison	MO		unknown	1 mile (1.6 km)	
EF0	Tornado remained over open country with no damage.						
EF2	S of Harned	Breckinridge	KY	37.75°N 86.42°W	1139	1 mile (1.6 km)	
EF2	A house sustained significant roof damage and two barns were heavily damaged. Trees were uprooted and snapped. Power poles were pushed over and sheet metal was found thrown up to 300 yards as well.						
EF0	SE of Harned	Breckinridge	KY	37.73°N 86.40°W	1142	0.1 miles (160 m)	
EF0	Brief tornado damaged a barn.						
EF0	S of Sulphur Springs	Perry	IN	38.19°N 86.50°W	1531	0.2 miles (320 m)	
EF0	Brief tornado uprooted several trees						
EF0	S of Theresa	Dodge	WI	43.45°N 88.45°W	2156	Unknown	
EF0	Brief tornado flattened grass in a swirl pattern and snapped tree limbs.						
EF0	E of Woodbine	Morris	KS	38.80°N 96.90°W	0112	Unknown	
EF0	Brief touchdown with no damage. Tornado lasted less than one minute.						
EF0	NW of Sedgwick	Sedgwick	CO		unknown	unknown	
EF0	Brief tornado over open country with no damage.						
EF0	E of Rake	Winnebago	IA		unknown	unknown	
EF0	Landspout tornado over open country with no damage. Tornado was very slow moving.						
EF1	S of Du Quion	Perry	IL	37.59°N 89.15°W	unknown	3 miles (4.8 km)	
EF1	Tornado struck the Du Quion State Fairgrounds and caused severe damage. Multiple trees were snapped and uprooted in the area, some of which landed on a shower/restroom building and the Farm Service Building, destroying them both. Several campers were flipped or demolished, in one of which 3 people were trapped and required rescue. An arena building sustained damage to its doors and had air conditioning units torn from its roof. Several nearby homes had shingles torn off and sustained damage from falling trees. Uprooted trees ruptured gas lines in the area as well. One person was injured.						
EF0	NW of Max (1st tornado)	Dundy	NE		unknown	3 miles (4.8 km)	
EF0	Tornado damaged the roof of a barn and overturned an irrigation pivot.						
EF0	NW of Max (2nd tornado)	Dundy	NE		unknown	2 miles (3.2 km)	
EF0	Tornado remained over open country with no damage.						
EF0	N of Perry	Red Willow	NE		unknown	3 miles (4.8 km)	
EF0	Large dusty tornado remained over open country with no damage.						

=== June 20 event ===
List of confirmed tornadoes – Monday, June 20, 2011
EF#	Location	County / Parish	State	Start Coord.	Time (UTC)	Path length	Max width
EF1	New Sharon area	Mahaska	IA	41.47°N 92.65°W	1005	0.5 miles (800 m)	
EF1	A modular building was mostly destroyed. Numerous trees downed and a few gravestones were toppled in a cemetery. Numerous trees were downed, some of which landed on homes. Power poles were downed as well and cars were pushed into a ditch.						
EF0	NW of Kingsley	Plymouth	IA	42.67°N 96.08°W	0240	1 mile (1.6 km)	
EF0	Numerous farm buildings and grain bins were damaged						
EF1	SW of Moorhead	Monona	IA	42.00°N 95.54°W	unknown	7 miles (11 km)	
EF1	Numerous trees and power lines were downed. One farm house lost section of its roof. A grain bin and several outbuildings were destroyed as well.						
EF1	NW of St. Joseph	Kossuth	IA	42.57°N 97.19°W	unknown	1 mile (1.6 km)	
EF1	One home was badly damaged and grain bins were destroyed. Trees were downed as well.						
EF1	SE of Bonfield	Kankakee	IL	41.13°N 88.03°W	1114	2.5 miles (4.0 km)	
EF1	Numerous trees were snapped or uprooted, causing severe damage to several homes. One outbuilding was destroyed.						
EF0	SE of Quinter	Gove	KS		1755	1 mile (1.6 km)	
EF0	Dusty tornado remained over open fields with no damage.						
EF0	NNE of Quinter	Gove	KS		1800	3 miles (4.8 km)	
EF0	Tornado remained over open country with no damage.						
EF0	WNW of St. Peter	Graham	KS		1812	5 miles (8.0 km)	
EF0	Tornado remained over open country with no damage.						
EF3	NNW of Hill City (1st tornado)	Graham, Norton	KS	39.50°N 99.85°W	1854	11 miles (18 km)	
EF3	Large wedge tornado produced severe damage in the area. Power poles were destroyed and irrigation pivots were overturned. Heavy farm equipment was thrown up to 3/4 of a mile. Grain bins and outbuilding were destroyed, and vehicles were flipped. One home sustained heavy roof damage and tree damage occurred as well.						
EF1	NNW of Hill City (2nd tornado)	Graham	KS		1857	1 mile (1.6 km)	
EF1	Satellite tornado to the EF3 Hill City storm						
EF1	N of Hill City	Graham	KS		1904	1 mile (1.6 km)	
EF1	Satellite tornado to the EF3 Hill City storm.						
EF0	NNW of Densmore	Norton	KS		1915	2 miles (3.2 km)	
EF0	Dusty tornado remained over open country with no damage.						
EF3	N of Densmore	Norton	KS		1925	4 miles (6.4 km)	
EF3	One home was completely destroyed. Outbuildings were destroyed and power poles were snapped. Trees were snapped and debarked as well.						
EF1	S of Calvert	Norton	KS		1926	2 miles (3.2 km)	
EF1	A barn was destroyed and four power poles were snapped.						
EF2	SSE of Calvert	Norton	KS		1930	4 miles (6.4 km)	
EF2	A barn and grain bin were destroyed. Power lines were damaged and irrigation pivots were overturned. One home was heavily damaged.						
EF0	SE of Almena	Norton	KS		1940	2 miles (3.2 km)	
EF0	Tornado remained over open country with no damage.						
EF3	NE of Almena	Norton, Phillips	KS	39.89°N 99.71°W	1941	5 miles (8.0 km)	
EF3	A house was completely destroyed, where four people were injured. Many homes and farmsteads sustained significant damage in the area. Multiple outbuildings were destroyed and heavy farm equipment was thrown and destroyed as well.						
EF1	S of Stamford	Harlan	NE	40.04°N 99.59°W	2000	13 miles (21 km)	
EF1	Multi-vortex tornado. Several outbuildings were destroyed and many windows were broken. Tornado also destroyed a grain bin and snapped tree limbs.						
EF0	ENE of Westmark	Phelps, Buffalo	NE		2035	5 miles (8.0 km)	
EF0	Tornado overturned multiple irrigation pivots along the path. Minor tree damage also occurred.						
EF2	Elm Creek area	Buffalo	NE	40.72°N 99.38°W	2051	4 miles (6.4 km)	
EF2	Tornado began west of Elm Creek and tracked east-southeast into the city. Numerous trees and were snapped or uprooted and several homes were damaged, some of which lost their roofs. One man was injured when his semi-truck was flipped by the tornado and power lines were snapped. A few outbuildings were also destroyed. while moving through the city, the storm took a sharp northward turn and weakened. Further down the track, the tornado briefly re-intensified as it damaged a home. It dissipated roughly 2.5 mi (4.0 km) southwest Amherst.						
EF3	W of Amherst	Buffalo	NE	40.87°N 99.27°W	2109	10 miles (16 km)	
EF3	Large wedge tornado damaged or destroyed over 48 homes, some of which were completely flattened. Large metal high-tension power line trusses were knocked down and over 40 irrigation pivots were damaged or destroyed. Numerous trees and power lines were snapped and outbuildings were destroyed as well.						
EF0	N of Pleasanton	Buffalo	NE	40.94°N 99.05°W	2135	4 miles (6.4 km)	
EF0	Tornado remained over open country with no damage.						
EF2	SW of Rockville	Sherman	NE	41.10°N 98.88°W	2146	3 miles (4.8 km)	
EF2	One home was damaged along with several trees. A pole building was destroyed as well.						
EF0	WSW of Farwell	Howard	NE		2205	unknown	
EF0	Brief tornado touchdown in a field damaged an irrigation pivot.						
EF2	SSW of Hampton	Hamilton	NE	40.80°N 97.93°W	2225	9 miles (14 km)	
EF2	Seven homes were damaged by the tornado. Numerous trees and power poles were snapped multiple and outbuildings were damaged or destroyed. A grain truck was overturned and several grain bins were damaged. At least 60 irrigation pivots were damaged or destroyed, some of which were found wrapped around trees.						
EF0	S of Selden	Sheridan	KS		2227	9 miles (14 km)	
EF0	Tornado remained over open country with no damage.						
EF0	NW of Norcatur	Decatur	KS		2325	1 mile (1.6 km)	
EF0	Brief tornado remained over open country with no damage.						
EF1	S of North Loup	Valley	NE	41.42°N 98.77°W	2235	1 mile (1.6 km)	
EF1	Damage occurred at Davis Creek campground. Numerous trees were downed and two restroom facilities had their roofs torn off.						
EF2	SW of Bradshaw to NE of Polk	York, Polk	NE	40.88°N 97.78°W	2240	17 miles (27 km)	
EF2	A train was derailed, grain bins damaged and over 40 power poles were downed. One home was badly damaged and a combine was tossed into a field and destroyed. Trees were also damaged and irrigation pivots were overturned.						
EF3	W of Osceola	Polk	NE	41.18°N 97.70°W	2302	9 miles (14 km)	
EF3	One home was destroyed and two others were damaged. Trees were debarked and power poles were snapped, irrigation pivots were overturned, and crops were stripped from the ground. Outbuildings were destroyed and a tractor was thrown and destroyed almost beyond recognition. An ATV, a car, and a semi-truck trailer were tossed by the tornado as well.						
EF0	NE of Norcatur	Norton	KS		2344	1 mile (1.6 km)	
EF0	Brief tornado remained over open country with no damage.						
EF0	N of Norcatur	Decatur	KS		2345	1 mile (1.6 km)	
EF0	Brief tornado remained over open country with no damage.						
EF1	SE of Pierce	Pierce	NE		0027	12 miles (19 km)	
EF1	Tornado downed numerous trees and power poles and destroyed barns and outbuildings. Irrigation pivots were overturned and a section of roof was torn from a home. Farm equipment was thrown up to 300 yards and other debris was thrown up to a quarter of a mile. A steel bin was thrown into a car, totaling the vehicle, and injuring the occupant.						
EF1	Fremont area	Dodge	NE		0100	6 miles (9.7 km)	
EF1	Tornado struck the northeast side of town. Numerous trees and power poles were snapped, some of which landed on homes and vehicles, and a garage was badly damaged. A YMCA sustained severe roof damage and a vehicle was flipped.						
EF0	E of Eliasville	Stephens	TX	32.95°N 98.72°W	0145	Unknown	
EF0	Brief tornado with no damage						
EF0	SW of Raub	McLean	ND	47.36°N 102.06°W	unknown	unknown	
EF0	Slow moving tornado remained over open country with no damage.						
EF0	NE of Almont	Morton	ND	46.46°N 101.25°W	unknown	unknown	
EF0	Brief tornado remained over open country with no damage.						

=== June 21 event ===
List of confirmed tornadoes – Tuesday, June 21, 2011
EF#	Location	County / Parish	State	Start Coord.	Time (UTC)	Path length	Max width
EF0	NE of Clutier	Tama	IA	42.09°N 92.39°W	0615	300 yards (270 m)	
EF0	Brief tornado snapped several trees and tore the roof off an outbuilding.						
EF0	Coon Rapids area	Anoka	MN	45.17°N 93.31°W	2010	5.5 miles (8.9 km)	
EF0	Damage was mostly confined to downed trees and power lines, a few of which landed on homes.						
EF1	WSW of Alto	Fond du Lac, Green Lake	WI	43.66°N 88.85°W	2021	4.6 miles (7.4 km)	
EF1	A pole-shed was flattened and a barn was damaged. Homes were also damaged. Several trees and power lines were downed.						
EF1	SSE of Green Lake	Fond du Lac, Green Lake	WI	43.78°N 88.92°W	2036	2.5 miles (4.0 km)	
EF1	A barn had part of its roof torn off and a pole shed sustained roof damage. Many trees were snapped or uprooted.						
EF0	E of Timpson	Shelby	TX	31.91°N 94.36°W	2055	4 miles (6.4 km)	
EF0	Several trees and branches were snapped						
EF0	W of Center	Shelby	TX	31.79°N 94.23°W	2200	1.5 miles (2.4 km)	
EF0	Several trees and branches were snapped						
EF1	S of Downers Grove	DuPage	IL	41.77°N 88.02°W	0131	2.1 miles (3.4 km)	
EF1	Many trees were snapped and uprooted, which damaged over 35 homes. A fence was blown down as well.						
EF1	WSW of Mount Prospect	Cook	IL	42.06°N 87.96°W	0148	2.3 miles (3.7 km)	
EF1	Numerous trees snapped and uprooted along the path, a few of which landed on homes and caused structural damage.						

=== June 22 event ===
List of confirmed tornadoes – Wednesday, June 22, 2011
EF#	Location	County / Parish	State	Start Coord.	Time (UTC)	Path length	Max width
EF1	Vardaman area	Calhoun	MS	33.87680°N 89.18581°W	1750	3 miles (4.8 km)	
EF1	Short-lived tornado numerous trees, some of which fell on homes, and damaged several tractor sheds. One person was injured after a tree fell on a home.						
EF0	NW of Loudon	Roane	TN	35.77°N 84.47°W	2240	0.1 miles (160 m)	
EF0	Brief tornado downed several trees.						
EF0	SW of New Middleton	Harrison	IN	31.84°N 86.04°W	2327	0.3 miles (480 m)	
EF0	A row of trees was damaged and a house lost some siding.						
EF0	Lake Leelanau	Leelanau	MI		1837	unknown	
EF0	Trees were downed and boats and docks were damaged. Tornado moved over the lake and dissipated.						
EF2	Louisville area	Jefferson	KY	38.22°N 85.74°W	0004	1.2 miles (1.9 km)	
EF2	Several barns were badly damaged in Churchill Downs, along with a church on the property. Elsewhere a large industrial building suffered heavy damage and numerous trees were uprooted and snapped. An office building lost a large section of its roof as well. A hotel also sustained roof damage and numerous power poles were snapped. Homes sustained shingle and siding damage and metal stoplight poles were downed.						
EF1	W of downtown Jeffersontown	Jefferson	KY	38.21°N 85.61°W	0129	1.9 miles (3.1 km)	
EF1	Tornado moved through a subdivision and caused roof, gutter, and siding damage. A locked pool gate was thrown 35 yards (30 m). Several trees were downed as well.						
EF2	Downtown Jeffersontown area	Jefferson	KY	38.21°N 85.55°W	0134	1.6 miles (2.6 km)	
EF2	Numerous trees snapped and uprooted, some of which landed on structures and vehicles. A warehouse and a nursing home were badly damaged and cars were flipped and tossed 25 feet. A small shed was thrown 30 feet and a metal light pole was bent over. A gas station was damaged as well.						
EF1	NE of downtown Jeffersontown	Jefferson	KY	38.21°N 85.55°W	0138	1.7 miles (2.7 km)	
EF1	Several warehouses suffered roof damage. An air handler was thrown 100-125 yards. Dozens of trees were uprooted as well.						

=== June 23 event ===
List of confirmed tornadoes – Thursday, June 23, 2011
EF#	Location	County / Parish	State	Start Coord.	Time (UTC)	Path length	Max width
EF0	SW of Moreland	Bingham	ID		unknown	1 mile (1.6 km)	
EF0	Four homes were damaged. A shed and a garage were destroyed. Trees were downed and a camper was flipped.						

=== June 24 event ===
List of confirmed tornadoes – Friday, June 24, 2011
EF#	Location	County / Parish	State	Start Coord.	Time (UTC)	Path length	Max width
EF1	E of Oak Ridge	Anderson	TN	35.96°N 84.19°W	0500	1.5 miles (2.4 km)	
EF1	Minor damage to roofs on homes. Trees were downed.						
EF0	Knoxville	Knox	TN	35.97°N 83.95°W	0520	1 mile (1.6 km)	
EF0	Trees and powerlines were downed. Minor damage to homes.						

=== June 25 event ===
List of confirmed tornadoes – Saturday, June 25, 2011
EF#	Location	County / Parish	State	Start Coord.	Time (UTC)	Path length	Max width
EF0	NE of Kimball	Kimball	NE		2152	unknown	
EF0	Brief touchdown with no damage.						
EF0	SW of Potter	Cheyenne	NE		2228	unknown	
EF0	Touchdown over open range. No damage was reported.						
EF0	NW of Sidney	Cheyenne	NE		2253	unknown	
EF0	Brief touchdown over open range. No damage was reported.						

=== June 26 event ===
List of confirmed tornadoes – Sunday, June 26, 2011
EF#	Location	County / Parish	State	Start Coord.	Time (UTC)	Path length	Max width
EF1	S of St. Meinrad	Spencer, Perry	IN		0712	2.3 miles (3.7 km)	
EF1	A cinder block building was destroyed and the roof of a metal building was blown off. Several other structures lost portions of their roofs.						
EF1	Millersport	Dubois	IN		0754	2 miles (3.2 km)	
EF1	Several homes and a vehicle were damaged. Numerous trees were downed.						
EF1	S of Halbur	Carroll	IA		0140	2.5 miles (4.0 km)	
EF1	Narrow tornado blew the roof off several buildings.						
EF0	Maryville area	Nodaway	MO		0050	unknown	
EF0	A few trees were downed with a tornado that was mostly over open fields.						
EF1	SE of Shelbina	Shelby	MO		0545	1.15 miles (1.85 km)	
EF1	Three unoccupied house trailers were destroyed, the town's water and power plants sustained significant roof damage, and a two-story museum suffered roof damage. Numerous tree were snapped or uprooted. First of two tornadoes in the area.						
EF1	SE of Shelbina	Shelby	MO		0547	1.22 miles (1.96 km)	
EF1	Homes suffered roof damage from falling trees and an assisted living home sustained roof damage. A machine shed was completely destroyed and tossed into a corn field. Several large trees were snapped of at 15–20 feet (4.6–6.1 m) above the base.						

=== June 27 event ===
List of confirmed tornadoes – Monday, June 27, 2011
EF#	Location	County / Parish	State	Start Coord.	Time (UTC)	Path length	Max width
EF1	S of Monroe City	Monroe	MO		0605	0.4 miles (640 m)	
EF1	Many large trees were snapped or uprooted.						
EF0	SW of Hassard	Ralls	MO		0609	0.6 miles (970 m)	
EF0	Numerous large trees were downed. A barn had its roof ripped off.						
EF1	WSW of Russellville	Brown	OH		0054	2 miles (3.2 km)	
EF1	Numerous trees were snapped or uprooted. Four small barns were demolished.						
EF0	N of Duke	Pike	OH		0153	2 miles (3.2 km)	
EF0	Trees were broken off or uprooted.						
EF0	SSE of Wilmington	Clinton	OH		0154	unknown	
EF0	Dirt was lifted into the funnel with this brief touchdown.						

=== June 29 event ===
List of confirmed tornadoes – Wednesday, June 29, 2011
EF#	Location	County / Parish	State	Start Coord.	Time (UTC)	Path length	Max width
EF1	N of Saco	Phillips	MT		0009	1 mile (1.6 km)	
EF1	A small tornado accompanied by a larger downburst severely damaged a ranch. Trees were debarked, a 1000-gallon fuel tank that was full of fuel was ripped away, and two houses suffered roof and window damage. A 2x6 piece of lumber was implanted into the side of one house. Not all of the damage was associated with the tornado.						
EF0	WSW of Glasgow	Valley	MT		0009	unknown	
EF0	Brief touchdown with no damage.						

=== June 30 event ===
List of confirmed tornadoes – Thursday, June 30, 2011
EF#	Location	County / Parish	State	Start Coord.	Time (UTC)	Path length	Max width
EF1	ENE of Hidalgo	Hidalgo	TX	26.12°N 98.19°W	2257	0.4 miles (640 m)	
EF1	Brief tornado in the outer bands of Tropical Storm Arlene touched down in a subdivision of Hidalgo, damaging several homes and outbuildings. An office building lost between 25 and 33 percent of its roof with debris being thrown into a nearby parking lot. Some of the debris struck a car, injuring the driver.						

== See also ==
- Tornadoes of 2011
- List of United States tornadoes in May 2011
- List of United States tornadoes from July to August 2011
