= List of United States tornadoes from September to October 2011 =

This is a list of all tornadoes that were confirmed by local offices of the National Weather Service in the United States in September 2011.

== United States yearly total ==
Confirmed tornadoes by Enhanced Fujita rating
| EFU | EF0 | EF1 | EF2 | EF3 | EF4 | EF5 | Total |
|---|---|---|---|---|---|---|---|
| 0 | 802 | 629 | 198 | 62 | 17 | 6 | 1,720 |

== September ==
Confirmed tornadoes by Enhanced Fujita rating
| EFU | EF0 | EF1 | EF2 | EF3 | EF4 | EF5 | Total |
|---|---|---|---|---|---|---|---|
| 0 | 34 | 15 | 2 | 0 | 0 | 0 | 51 |

=== September 1 event ===
List of reported tornadoes - Thursday, September 1, 2011
| EF# | Location | County | Coord. | Time (UTC) | Path length | Comments/Damage |
|---|---|---|---|---|---|---|
Montana
| EF0 | NE of Polson Airport | Lake | 47°46′N 114°02′W | 1855 | 1 mile (1.6 km) | Brief tornado. |
Arizona
| EF0 | SE of Holbrook | Navajo | 34°52′N 110°07′W | 2025 | 1 mile (1.6 km) | Brief tornado. |
Sources: NCDC Storm Events Database

=== September 3 event ===
- This events were related to Tropical Storm Lee.

List of reported tornadoes - Sunday, September 4, 2011
| EF# | Location | County | Coord. | Time (UTC) | Path length | Comments/Damage |
|---|---|---|---|---|---|---|
Mississippi
| EF0 | N of Kiln | Hancock | 30.47°N 89.43°W | 1220 | 0.1 miles (0.16 km) | A mobile home was damaged and a few trees were blown down. |
Louisiana
| EF0 | ESE of Ridge | Lafayette | 30°09′N 92°09′W | 1810 | unknown | Brief tornado. |
| EF0 | NNE of Verret | St. Bernard | 29°51′N 89°46′W | 0150 | 0.5 miles (0.80 km) | A trailer and a brick house were damaged. |
Alabama
| EF0 | W of Dauphin Island | Mobile | 30°15′N 88°12′W | 1812 | unknown | Brief tornado. |
Sources: NCDC Storm Events Database

=== September 4 event ===
- The events in AL, MS, and FL were related to Tropical Storm Lee.

List of reported tornadoes - Sunday, September 4, 2011
| EF# | Location | County | Coord. | Time (UTC) | Path length | Comments/Damage |
|---|---|---|---|---|---|---|
Alabama
| EF1 | Mouth of the East Fowl River | Mobile | 30.45°N 88.10°W | 0602 | 2 miles (3.2 km) | Several homes were damaged, a barn was damaged, and a mobile home was destroyed. |
| EF0 | Rainbow City area | Etowah | 33.94°N 86.04°W | 2050 | 0.7 miles (1.1 km) | Several trees were downed, two barns were damaged, and the shingles of an apartment were torn off. |
Florida
| EF1 | Perdido Key, FL to Lillian, AL | Escambia, Baldwin (AL) | 30.29°N 87.43°W | 0710 | 7 miles (11 km) | A waterspout moved onshore and caused significant damage to several homes. One brick home was destroyed after a large tree fell on it. |
| EF0 | SE of Crestview | Okaloosa | 30°43′N 86°33′W | 1015 | 1 mile (1.6 km) | Brief tornado caused minor damage. |
| EF0 | NNW of Vicksburg | Bay | 30°25′N 85°41′W | 1532 | 1 mile (1.6 km) | Brief tornado. |
Mississippi
| EF1 | SSE of McNeil | Pearl River | 30.62°N 89.66°W | 1243 | 0.6 miles (0.97 km) | Many trees were snapped, shingles were torn from a garage. An aircraft was torn from the place it was tied and a boat sustained damage. |
| EF0 | ESE of Sumrall | Lamar | 31.40°N 89.48°W | 1305 | 0.4 miles (0.64 km) | A few trees blown down. |
| EF1 | N of Lyman | Harrison | 30.55°N 89.14°W | 1742 | 3.5 miles (5.6 km) | Trees were snapped and uprooted. Fences were blown down and several mobile homes and houses were damaged. |
| EF1 | W of Ten Mile | Stone | 30°46′N 89°09′W | 0010 | 9 miles (14 km) | Tornado damaged several homes and injured one person. |
| EF0 | NW of McLaurin | Stone | 31°12′N 89°16′W | 0045 | unknown | Brief tornado. |
| EF1 | SSE of Williamsburg | Covington | 31°36′N 89°36′W | 0105 | 4 miles (6.4 km) | Two barns were heavily damaged along the tornado path. One home suffered minor roof and structural damage. A number of trees were snapped and uprooted. A wooden light pole was snapped and a couple of power lines were downed. |
| EF0 | SE of Pineville | Smith | 32°05′N 89°21′W | 0345 | 1 mile (1.6 km) | Tornado downed several trees. |
New York
| EF1 | SW of Cranesville | Montgomery, Schenectady | 42.89°N 74.16°W | 2120 | 7 miles (11 km) | Several trees were snapped. Homes had broken windows and roof damage. |
Sources: SPC Storm Reports for 09/03/11, SPC Storm Reports for 09/04/11, NWS Albany, NWS Birmingham, NWS New Orleans, NWS Mobile, NWS Baton Rouge, NWS Mobile, NWS Jackson, NWS Birmingham, NWS New Orleans, NWS Baton Rouge

=== September 5 event ===
- The events were related to Tropical Storm Lee.

List of reported tornadoes - Monday, September 5, 2011
| EF# | Location | County | Coord. | Time (UTC) | Path length | Comments/Damage |
|---|---|---|---|---|---|---|
Alabama
| EF0 | SSW of Hogglesville | Hale | 32°46′N 87°30′W | 1700 | 3.4 miles (5.5 km) | Several trees were knocked down. One fell on a barn, another on a house. |
Florida
| EF0 | SE of Dellwood | Jackson | 30°47′N 85°01′W | 1757 | 3.4 miles (5.5 km) | Tornado uprooted several trees and moved a tractor. |
Georgia
| EF1 | WSW of Woodstock to NNW of Marblehill | Cherokee, Pickens | 34°04′N 84°33′W | 1911 | 24 miles (39 km) | Long-lived tornado damaged 600 homes of which 148 sustained major damage and 7 were destroyed. One person was injured. Damage from the tornado reached $20 million. |
North Carolina
| EF1 | Abshers area | Wilkes | 36.37°N 81.08°W | 2120 | 1.3 miles (2.1 km) | Fourteen outbuildings were destroyed. Minor damage to three homes. |
| EF0 | WSW of Unionville | Union | 35°04′N 80°33′W | 2351 | 0.5 miles (0.80 km) | Brief tornado damaged several barns. |
| EF0 | NNE of Millingport | Stanly | 35°25′N 80°17′W | 0053 | 4 miles (6.4 km) | Tornado destroyed two outbuildings and damaged several other structures. |
South Carolina
| EF0 | NNE of Newberry | Newberry | 34°22′N 81°32′W | 2116 | 100 yards (91 m) | Several trees were knocked down. |
Virginia
| EF0 | Troy area | Fluvanna | 37.94°N 78.20°W | 2205 | 0.8 miles (1.3 km) | Several trees were knocked down and a church was damaged. |
| EF0 | ENE of Cana | Carroll | 36°34′N 80°39′W | 0203 | unknown | Brief tornado damaged a gas station and injured two people. |
Sources: SPC Storm Reports for 09/05/11, NWS Colombia, NWS Jackson, NWS Atlanta, NWS Mobile, NWS Jackson, NWS Blacksburg, NWS Jackson, NWS Wakefield, NWS Birmingham

=== September 6 event ===
- The events were related to Tropical Storm Lee.

List of reported tornadoes - Tuesday, September 6, 2011
| EF# | Location | County | Coord. | Time (UTC) | Path length | Comments/Damage |
|---|---|---|---|---|---|---|
North Carolina
| EF0 | N of Pinehurst | Moore | 35.15°N 79.43°W | 1040 | 1.3 miles (2.1 km) | Tornado knocked down several trees. Two trees fell on houses. A small boat was lifted from a pond and tossed onto the property of the North Carolina Golf Resort. |
| EF0 | SE of Rennert | Robeson | 34°48′N 79°03′W | 2341 | 1 mile (1.6 km) | Tornado damaged several buildings and uprooted many trees. |
Sources: SPC Storm Reports for 09/05/11, NWS Roanoke, NWS Greer, NWS Raleigh, NWS Raleigh

=== September 7 event ===
- The events were related to Tropical Storm Lee.

List of reported tornadoes - Wednesday, September 7, 2011
| EF# | Location | County | Coord. | Time (UTC) | Path length | Comments/Damage |
|---|---|---|---|---|---|---|
Maryland
| EF0 | SSE of Chingville | St. Mary's | 38°13′N 76°32′W | 2333 | unknown | Brief tornado snapped several trees. |
| EF0 | ENE of Wicomico | Charles | 38°24′N 76°52′W | 0134 | 1 mile (1.6 km) | Shingles, siding, and the chimney were blown off a house. Several trees were toppled and a shed was destroyed. |
Sources: SPC Storm Reports for 09/07/11, NWS Sterling

=== September 14 event ===
List of reported tornadoes - Wednesday, September 14, 2011
| EF# | Location | County | Coord. | Time (UTC) | Path length | Comments/Damage |
|---|---|---|---|---|---|---|
Arizona
| EF2 | N of Flagstaff | Coconino | | 2323 | 1.3 miles (2.1 km) | Many trees were severely damaged. Tornado occurred at over 9,000 feet (2,700 m) in elevation. |
Sources: SPC Storm Reports for 09/14/11, NWS Flagstaff

=== September 15 event ===
List of reported tornadoes - Thursday, September 15, 2011
| EF# | Location | County | Coord. | Time (UTC) | Path length | Comments/Damage |
|---|---|---|---|---|---|---|
Maryland
| EF0 | Ocean City area | Worcester | 38.39°N 75.07°W | 2035 | 0.5 miles (0.80 km) | Minor damage to siding, windows, and roofs on buildings. There were a few windows broken on cars. |
Sources: SPC Storm Reports for 09/15/11, NWS Wakefield

=== September 17 event ===
List of reported tornadoes - Saturday, September 17, 2011
| EF# | Location | County | Coord. | Time (UTC) | Path length | Comments/Damage |
|---|---|---|---|---|---|---|
Texas
| EF1 | NE of Alice | Jim Wells | 27.86°N 97.94°W | 2209 | 2 miles (3.2 km) | A house lost part of its roof. A shed was damaged and many trees were downed. |
Oklahoma
| EF0 | S of Wakita (1st tornado) | Grant | 36°49′N 97°55′W | 2246 | 2 miles (3.2 km) | Brief tornado with no damage. |
| EF0 | SSE of Wakita | Grant | 36°48′N 97°53′W | 2249 | 1 mile (1.6 km) | Brief tornado with no damage. |
| EF0 | S of Wakita (2nd tornado) | Grant | 36°45′N 97°54′W | 2255 | 1 mile (1.6 km) | Brief tornado with no damage. |
Sources: SPC Storm Reports for 09/17/11, NWS Corpus Christi

=== September 18 event ===
List of reported tornadoes - Sunday, September 18, 2011
| EF# | Location | County | Coord. | Time (UTC) | Path length | Comments/Damage |
|---|---|---|---|---|---|---|
Missouri
| EF0 | W of Washburn | Barry | 36°34′N 94°01′W | 2230 | unknown | Brief tornado with no damage was observed by a volunteer fire department. |
Sources: NCDC Storm Events

=== September 19 event ===
List of reported tornadoes - Monday, September 19, 2011
| EF# | Location | County | Coord. | Time (UTC) | Path length | Comments/Damage |
|---|---|---|---|---|---|---|
Mississippi
| EF0 | WSW of Mississippi City | Harrison | 30°22′N 89°02′W | 1747 | unknown | Waterspout briefly moved onshore before dissipating. |
Florida
| EF0 | E of Union Park | Orange | 28°34′N 81°16′W | 1815 | unknown | Brief tornado picked up some sand and dust. People observed the winds to be only 30 to 35 MPH. |
Sources: NCDC Storm Events Database

=== September 22 event ===
List of reported tornadoes - Thursday, September 22, 2011
| EF# | Location | County | Coord. | Time (UTC) | Path length | Comments/Damage |
|---|---|---|---|---|---|---|
New York
| EF0 | SE of Auriesville | Montgomery | 42°54′N 74°18′W | 2215 | 1 mile (1.6 km) | Tornado downed many trees. |
Sources: NCDC Storm Events Database

=== September 25 event ===
List of reported tornadoes - Sunday, September 25, 2011
| EF# | Location | County | Coord. | Time (UTC) | Path length | Comments/Damage |
|---|---|---|---|---|---|---|
Arkansas
| EF0 | W of Tichnor | Arkansas | 34.14°N 91.31°W | 2330 | 2.8 miles (4.5 km) | Several trees were knocked down. Shingles were torn off houses and tin was peeled off a barn. |
Kentucky
| EF2 | White Plains area | Hopkins | 37.17°N 87.39°W | 0125 | 0.33 miles (0.53 km) | A framed home and mobile home were destroyed. Two framed homes suffered minimal damage, and four sheds were damaged. Large trees and powerlines were downed. |
| EF1 | NE of Herndon | Christian | 36°45′N 87°32′W | 0150 | 1 mile (1.6 km) | Two barns were damaged, one of which was nearly destroyed. |
Mississippi
| EF1 | NW of Cleveland | Bolivar, Sunflower | 33.80°N 90.80°W | 0104 | 11 miles (18 km) | Numerous houses, trailer homes, and outbuildings suffered moderate damage. Several trees and power lines were knocked down and signs were blown away. |
| EF1 | SSW of Drew | Sunflower | 33°47′N 90°33′W | 0129 | 1 mile (1.6 km) | An agricultural pivot was flipped over, the roof was blown off a pumphouse as well as a baseball dugout, and some playground equipment was flipped over. Trees and power lines were downed. |
Indiana
| EF1 | NNW of Hayden | Jennings | 39°01′N 85°44′W | 0433 | 0.5 miles (0.80 km) | A pole barn was destroyed and two houses were damaged. |
Sources: SPC Storm Reports for 09/25/11, NWS Little Rock, NWS Jackson, NWS Paducah

=== September 27 event ===
List of reported tornadoes - Tuesday, September 27, 2011
| EF# | Location | County | Coord. | Time (UTC) | Path length | Comments/Damage |
|---|---|---|---|---|---|---|
Indiana
| EF0 | E of Nappanee | Elkhart | 41.44°N 85.96°W | 1656 | 0.6 miles (0.97 km) | A tornado with a non-continuous damage path caused minor roof and tree damage. |
Sources: SPC Storm Reports for 09/27/11, NWS Northern Indiana

=== September 28 event ===
List of reported tornadoes - Wednesday, September 28, 2011
| EF# | Location | County | Coord. | Time (UTC) | Path length | Comments/Damage |
|---|---|---|---|---|---|---|
Michigan
| EF0 | Temperance area | Monroe | 41°46′N 83°33′W | 1946 | unknown | Brief tornado caused minor structural damage. |
Sources: NCDC Storm Events

=== September 29 event ===
List of reported tornadoes - Thursday, September 29, 2011
| EF# | Location | County | Coord. | Time (UTC) | Path length | Comments/Damage |
|---|---|---|---|---|---|---|
North Carolina
| EF1 | WNW of Jerry | Tyrrell | 35°53′N 76°15′W | 0810 | unknown | Tornado destroyed a mobile home, injuring the occupant, and damaged several others. |
Sources: NCDC Storm Events

== October ==
Confirmed tornadoes by Enhanced Fujita rating
| EFU | EF0 | EF1 | EF2 | EF3 | EF4 | EF5 | Total |
|---|---|---|---|---|---|---|---|
| 0 | 15 | 7 | 1 | 0 | 0 | 0 | 23 |

=== October 5 event ===
List of reported tornadoes - Wednesday, October 5, 2011
| EF# | Location | County | Coord. | Time (UTC) | Path Length | Comments/Damage |
|---|---|---|---|---|---|---|
Washington
| EF0 | NW of St. John | Whitman | 47°13′N 117°46′W | 2219 | unknown | Brief touchdown with no damage. |
Source: NCDC Storm Events

=== October 6 event ===
List of reported tornadoes - Thursday, October 6, 2011
| EF# | Location | County | Coord. | Time (UTC) | Path Length | Comments/Damage |
|---|---|---|---|---|---|---|
Kansas
| EF1 | SSE of Brewster | Thomas | 39°18′N 101°21′W | 0217 | 7 miles (11 km) | One farmstead sustained significant damage. Several outbuildings were also affected. |
Source: NCDC Storm Events

=== October 7 event ===
List of reported tornadoes - Friday, October 7, 2011
| EF# | Location | County | Coord. | Time (UTC) | Path Length | Comments/Damage |
|---|---|---|---|---|---|---|
Kansas
| EF1 | NNW of Manning | Scott, Lane | 38°33′N 100°43′W | 0245 | 5 miles (8.0 km) | Tornado struck a farm, damaging outbuildings and trees. |
| EF0 | N of Modoc | Scott | 38°31′N 101°05′W | 0538 | 2 miles (3.2 km) | Rain-wrapped tornado remained over open fields. |
Source: NCDC Storm Events

=== October 8 event ===
List of reported tornadoes - Saturday, October 8, 2011
| EF# | Location | County | Coord. | Time (UTC) | Path Length | Comments/Damage |
|---|---|---|---|---|---|---|
Kansas
| EF1 | NNE of Tice | Haskell | 37°33′N 100°42′W | 0950 | 3 miles (4.8 km) | Small tornado severely damaged a shed and uprooted a tree |
Source: NCDC Storm Events

=== October 9 event ===
List of reported tornadoes - Sunday, October 9, 2011
| EF# | Location | County | Coord. | Time (UTC) | Path length | Comments/Damage |
|---|---|---|---|---|---|---|
Texas
| EF1 | San Antonio area | Bexar | 29.37°N 98.63°W | 0610 | 1.9 miles (3.1 km) | Tornado touched down along Interstate 410 with several houses and businesses damaged and several postal trucks flipped in a parking lot. |
Sources: SPC Storm Reports for 10/08/11, NWS Austin/San Antonio

=== October 10 event ===
List of reported tornadoes - Monday, October 10, 2011
| EF# | Location | County | Coord. | Time (UTC) | Path length | Comments/Damage |
|---|---|---|---|---|---|---|
Florida
| EF1 | W of Fruit Cove | Clay | 30.09°N 81.70°W | 0715 | 1 mile (1.6 km) | A house sustained roof damage and trees were snapped. |
Sources: SPC Storm Reports for 10/09/11

=== October 12 event ===
List of reported tornadoes - Wednesday, October 12, 2011
| EF# | Location | County | Coord. | Time (UTC) | Path length | Comments/Damage |
|---|---|---|---|---|---|---|
Texas
| EF0 | SE of Tarkington Prairie | Liberty | 30°18′N 94°59′W | 2230 | 4 miles (6.4 km) | A mobile home was overturned, injuring an occupant. |
Arkansas
| EF0 | NW of Berryville | Carroll | 36°23′N 93°36′W | 0003 | unknown | Brief touchdown over open country was witnessed by several people. No damage was reported. |
Sources: SPC Storm Reports for 10/12/11, NCDC Storm Events Database

=== October 13 event ===
List of reported tornadoes - Thursday, October 13, 2011
| EF# | Location | County | Coord. | Time (UTC) | Path length | Comments/Damage |
|---|---|---|---|---|---|---|
Virginia
| EF1 | SW of Waldrop | Louisa | 38.03°N 78.19°W | 1940 | 0.6 miles (970 m) | Brief tornado damaged a historical plantation at the Green Springs National Historic Landmark District and several trees. |
| EF0 | NNE of Nasons | Orange | 38.28°N 78.02°W | 2005 | 1.3 miles (2.1 km) | Damage limited to a few trees uprooted or snapped. |
| EF1 | SE of Tunstall | New Kent | 37°28′N 77°07′W | 2047 | 9 miles (14 km) | Many homes were damaged and trees were downed. |
| EF0 | E of Bealeton | Fauquier | 38.55°N 77.72°W | 2058 | 6.3 miles (10.1 km) | Two barns were heavily damaged and several houses were also damaged. Intermittent tree damage along the path. |
| EF0 | W of Quantico | Stafford, Prince William | 38.49°N 77.38°W | 2122 | 2.7 miles (4.3 km) | Several houses sustained minor damage and trees were uprooted. |
| EF0 | Triangle area | Prince William | 38°31′N 77°27′W | 2129 | 1.5 miles (2.4 km) | Trees were snapped and uprooted. Tornado crossed Interstate 95 in rush hour traffic but was very weak at the time with no damage. |
| EF0 | SW of Fairfax | Fairfax | 38.80°N 77.37°W | 2140 | 3 miles (4.8 km) | Weak tornado with minor damage to trees. |
Sources: SPC Storm Reports for 10/13/11, NWS Sterling, VA, NWS Wakefield, VA

=== October 18 event ===
List of reported tornadoes - Tuesday, October 18, 2011
| EF# | Location | County | Coord. | Time (UTC) | Path length | Comments/Damage |
|---|---|---|---|---|---|---|
Florida
| EF0 | Lakeport area | Glades | 26.98°N 81.13°W | 2325 | 1.5 miles (2.4 km) | A weak tornado damaged about 30 homes. |
| EF0 | NE of Lakeport | Glades | 27°06′N 80°56′W | 2355 | 2 miles (3.2 km) | A home and a barn were damaged. Roof and window damage occurred at the home. |
| EF0 | N of Indiantown | Martin | 27°03′N 80°28′W | 0120 | unknown | A two-story home sustained minor damage. A pole barn was destroyed and the roof was removed from a commercial building. Several trees were downed. |
| EF0 | NNW of Indrio | Indian River | 27.56°N 80.37°W | 0130 | 1 mile (1.6 km) | A weak tornado caused major damage to an unoccupied home. |
| EF2 | Sunrise area | Broward | 26.13°N 80.33°W | 0207 | 1.11 miles (1.79 km) | Brief but intense tornado damaged 50 homes and injured a few people. Two trailers were mostly destroyed. |
Sources: SPC Storm Reports for 10/18/11

=== October 29 event ===
- These events were related to Hurricane Rina.

List of reported tornadoes - Saturday, October 29, 2011
| EF# | Location | County | Coord. | Time (UTC) | Path length | Comments/Damage |
|---|---|---|---|---|---|---|
Florida
| EF0 | Hobe Sound area (1st tornado) | Martin | 27°06′N 80°09′W | 1316 | unknown | Brief tornado removed the roof from a mobile home and damaged several other buildings. |
| EF0 | Hobe Sound area (2nd tornado) | Martin | 27°06′N 80°09′W | 1318 | unknown | Tornado toppled many trees before moving over Peck Lake as a waterspout. |
Sources: SPC Storm Reports for 10/29/11

== See also ==
- Tornadoes of 2011
- List of United States tornadoes from July to August 2011
- List of United States tornadoes from November to December 2011
