= List of United States tornadoes from November to December 2011 =

This is a list of all tornadoes that were confirmed by local offices of the National Weather Service in the United States in November and December 2011. Based on the 1991–2010 averaging period, 58 tornadoes occur across the United States throughout November, while 24 more occur in December.

Similar to the Paxton, November and December remained slightly below average with 46 and 15 tornadoes respectively. However, a couple days in November saw heightened periods of activity. Oklahoma recorded its first violent November tornado since modern records began in 1950, an EF4 tornado in Tillman County on November 7. Twenty tornadoes struck the South on November 16, including a long-track EF2 tornado in parts of Alabama and Georgia and two additional EF2 tornadoes that resulted in five fatalities in the Carolinas. December activity was confined to three consecutive days towards the end of the month, the highlight being a 13-tornado event primarily in Alabama and Georgia on December 22. Floyd County, Georgia was struck by EF2 and EF3 tornadoes, both of which caused considerable damage.

== United States yearly total ==
Confirmed tornadoes by Enhanced Fujita rating
EFU	EF0	EF1	EF2	EF3	EF4	EF5	Total
0	802	629	199	62	17	6	1,721

== November ==
Confirmed tornadoes by Enhanced Fujita rating
EFU	EF0	EF1	EF2	EF3	EF4	EF5	Total
0	21	16	8	0	1	0	46

=== November 7 event ===
List of confirmed tornadoes – Monday, November 7, 2011 (Note: All dates are based on the local time zone where the tornado touched down; however, all times are in Coordinated Universal Time and dates are split at midnight CDT for consistency.)
EF#	Location	County / Parish	State	Start Coord.	Time (UTC)	Path length	Max width
EF4	NNE of Vernon, TX to NNE of Tipton, OK	Wilbarger (TX), Jackson (OK), Tillman (OK)	TX, OK	34.33°N 99.22°W	20:38–21:13	17.39 mi (27.99 km)	500 yd (460 m)
EF4	A long-lived tornado moved briefly through Wilbarger and Jackson counties with no damage before crossing into Tillman County, where it quickly intensified. At the Oklahoma State University Agronomy Research Station, buildings were demolished and blown into nearby fields, and trees near the site were debarked and splintered, resulting in the EF4 rating. To the north, an Oklahoma Mesonet station measured a peak wind gust of 86.4 mph (139.0 km/h) before being destroyed by flying debris. This was the first F4 or EF4 tornado in Oklahoma during the month of November since official records began in 1950.						
EF0	S of Tipton	Tillman	OK	34.4566°N 99.1400°W	20:59	0.5 mi (0.80 km)	75 yd (69 m)
EF0	A brief satellite tornado was observed to be rotating around the main EF4 tornado. No known damage occurred.						
EF0	NW of Manitou to S of Snyder	Tillman, Kiowa	OK	34.526°N 99.019°W	21:15–21:27	6.05 mi (9.74 km)	400 yd (370 m)
EF0	This large tornado remained over open fields with no damage.						
EF0	E of Snyder	Kiowa	OK	34.660°N 98.904°W	21:38	0.5 mi (0.80 km)	100 yd (91 m)
EF0	Brief tornado with no damage.						
EF0	ENE of Mountain Park to ENE of Saddle Mountain	Kiowa, Comanche	OK	34.726°N 98.836°W	21:52–22:18	13.38 mi (21.53 km)	500 yd (460 m)
EF0	A large tornado remained mostly over open areas with no damage. One elk was killed in the Wichita Mountains Wildlife Refuge.						
EF0	ENE of Saddle Mountain	Kiowa	OK	34.883°N 98.675°W	22:19–22:22	1.4 mi (2.3 km)	100 yd (91 m)
EF0	Brief tornado with no damage.						
EF0	NE of Saddle Mountain	Kiowa	OK	34.907°N 98.642°W	22:24–22:26	0.5 mi (0.80 km)	100 yd (91 m)
EF0	Brief tornado with no damage.						
EF0	NE of Alden	Caddo	OK	34.9974°N 98.5441°W	22:40–22:48	3 mi (4.8 km)	150 yd (140 m)
EF0	This tornado remained over open fields with no damage.						
EF1	SW of Fort Cobb to WSW of Albert	Caddo	OK	35.042°N 98.523°W	22:51–23:17	13 mi (21 km)	400 yd (370 m)
EF1	A multiple-vortex tornado damaged a barn and cattle pens at the beginning of the path. As the tornado moved northward, it struck an Oklahoma Mesonet station near Fort Cobb Lake. The station measured a peak wind gust of 91 mph (146 km/h) before it was knocked down by a large irrigation pivot from a neighboring field. The tornado crossed the Lake before dissipating.						
EF1	NE of Blanchard	McClain	OK	35.1707°N 97.6225°W	04:47–04:49	1.6 mi (2.6 km)	110 yd (100 m)
EF1	A barn lost most of its roof, a house sustained roof and siding damage, and several trees were snapped.						

=== November 8 event ===
List of confirmed tornadoes – Tuesday, November 8, 2011
EF#	Location	County / Parish	State	Start Coord.	Time (UTC)	Path length	Max width
EF1	Kingwood	Harris	TX	30.0536°N 95.1519°W	19:37–19:39	0.35 mi (0.56 km)	150 yd (140 m)
EF1	Several houses sustained roof and window damage, garage doors were blown in, and many trees were snapped or uprooted.						
EF1	Valliant	McCurtain	OK	33.9511°N 95.1416°W	19:45–20:02	6.15 mi (9.90 km)	50 yd (46 m)
EF1	The tornado began southwest of Valliant and dissipated northeast of town. Two empty railroad cars were thrown off railroad tracks, a small outbuilding was lifted from its base, and many trees and power lines were downed.						
EF1	ENE of Cushing to NE of Mount Enterprise	Nacogdoches, Rusk	TX	31.8360°N 94.7696°W	20:02–20:26	12.35 mi (19.88 km)	150 yd (140 m)
EF1	Many trees were downed south and east of Mount Enterprise.						
EF0	N of Mount Enterprise	Rusk	TX	31.9182°N 94.7401°W	21:34–21:43	6.37 mi (10.25 km)	70 yd (64 m)
EF0	Numerous trees were downed along the path.						
EF2	NNE of Logansport to NNW of Grand Cane	De Soto	LA	32.0360°N 93.9509°W	22:53–23:13	9.59 mi (15.43 km)	200 yd (180 m)
EF2	Numerous trees were snapped or uprooted, with a few homes being damaged primarily by falling trees.						
EF0	SW of Elm Grove	Caddo, Bossier	LA	32.3379°N 93.6137°W	23:50–23:55	2.85 mi (4.59 km)	75 yd (69 m)
EF0	Several trees were downed.						
EF0	NW of Texas City	Galveston	TX	29.4270°N 94.9734°W	00:00–00:02	0.27 mi (430 m)	25 yd (23 m)
EF0	An industrial plant sustained minor building damage, and ten trailers were overturned on the lot.						
EF0	S of Sibley to SE of Dubberly	Webster	LA	32.462°N 93.290°W	00:20–00:31	5.56 mi (8.95 km)	75 yd (69 m)
EF0	Many trees were snapped or uprooted to the north and northeast of Heflin.						
EF0	SE of Dubberly	Webster	LA	32.508°N 93.246°W	00:29–00:33	2.94 mi (4.73 km)	75 yd (69 m)
EF0	This tornado moved parallel to the previous tornado just south and east of Dubberly. Several trees were snapped or uprooted, and tree limbs were broken.						
EF1	SE of Kirbyville	Newton	TX	30.600°N 93.870°W	01:58–02:03	3.56 mi (5.73 km)	150 yd (140 m)
EF1	A barn and store sustained minor damage in the Call community. Numerous trees were snapped, twisted, or uprooted as well.						
EF1	E of Florien to S of Bellwood	Sabine, Natchitoches	LA	31.448°N 93.318°W	02:26–02:39	7.11 mi (11.44 km)	200 yd (180 m)
EF1	Many trees were snapped or uprooted, especially in the Kisatchie National Forest, where 30–40 acres (0.12–0.16 km^{2}) of timber was damaged or destroyed. Power lines were downed as well.						

=== November 14 event ===
List of confirmed tornadoes – Monday, November 14, 2011
EF#	Location	County / Parish	State	Start Coord.	Time (UTC)	Path length	Max width
EF2	W of Fredonia	Chautauqua	NY	42.4464°N 79.4200°W	21:54–22:05	4.13 mi (6.65 km)	125 yd (114 m)
EF2	This tornado began on Lake Erie and moved on shore toward Fredonia, producing intermittent damage. Two homes lost shingles, a garage and a barn were destroyed, a drive-in screen was blown over, and eight power poles were snapped. Numerous trees were downed as well, with one falling on a home.						
EF2	Southern Westfield	Chautauqua	NY	42.3024°N 79.5929°W	22:05–22:15	2.92 mi (4.70 km)	120 yd (110 m)
EF2	A house was destroyed, with the attached garage ripped off and the back wall blown out, and three barns and three outbuildings were destroyed, with several boats and vehicles inside one of the barns being damaged. Numerous trees were downed as well.						
EF1	Paoli	Orange	IN	38.5539°N 86.4801°W	00:32–00:35	2 mi (3.2 km)	50 yd (46 m)
EF1	Buildings in downtown Paoli sustained considerable damage, with large section of roofing removed from the police department, metal roofs removed from two businesses, and three chimneys on the Orange County Courthouse collapsed. A barn was destroyed and several buildings and outbuildings had their roofs severely damaged or removed. Elsewhere, several homes sustained roof damage, three outbuildings were damaged, and a 100-year-old barn was destroyed. Numerous trees were snapped or uprooted as well.						

=== November 15 event ===
List of confirmed tornadoes – Tuesday, November 15, 2011
EF#	Location	County / Parish	State	Start Coord.	Time (UTC)	Path length	Max width
EF0	NW of Cleveland	San Jacinto	TX	30.4207°N 95.2025°W	20:20–20:22	0.1 mi (160 m)	20 yd (18 m)
EF0	A brief tornado touched down over a pasture, causing dust to rise but resulting in no damage.						

=== November 16 event ===
List of confirmed tornadoes – Wednesday, November 16, 2011
EF#	Location	County / Parish	State	Start Coord.	Time (UTC)	Path length	Max width
EF1	NE of Greensburg	St. Helena	LA	30.88°N 90.61°W	08:40–08:41	0.45 mi (720 m)	150 yd (140 m)
EF1	A two-story home was pushed 10 feet (3.0 m) off its foundation and had an exterior wall collapse, and several trees and power lines were downed.						
EF0	SE of Houma	Terrebonne	LA	29.57°N 90.70°W	09:35–09:36	0.1 mi (160 m)	25 yd (23 m)
EF0	A brief tornado blew out three windows at Village East Elementary School, blew a shed out of a yard, threw an awning over a home, and removed shingles from another home. A boat was flipped, and some tree tops were snapped.						
EF1	N of Columbia to SE of Bassfield	Marion, Jefferson Davis	MS	31.3707°N 89.8349°W	10:11–10:25	9.63 mi (15.50 km)	440 yd (400 m)
EF1	Several homes and mobile homes sustained roof damage, a carport was collapsed, several metal shed were either severely damaged or destroyed, and the roof of a newly built barn was removed. One home also had TV and radio antennas blown down, and a cattle trailer was thrown approximately 200 yards (180 m). Many trees were snapped or uprooted along the path, along with several snapped power poles.						
EF1	SE of Hebron	Jones	MS	31.6608°N 89.3275°W	11:03–11:07	2.2 mi (3.5 km)	50 yd (46 m)
EF1	A large house sustained moderate roof damage, two outbuildings were damaged, one heavily, and numerous trees were downed.						
EF2	WNW of Laurel to NW of Sandersville	Jones, Jasper	MS	31.7079°N 89.2473°W	11:12–11:30	12.95 mi (20.84 km)	300 yd (270 m)
EF2	In the Shady Grove community northwest of Laurel, several frame and brick homes sustained moderate to major damage and several mobile homes were destroyed. Commercial buildings along Mississippi Highway 15 sustained major damage, and other homes north of Laurel had minor roof and structural damage. In Jasper County, three large chicken houses were destroyed. Extensive tree damage occurred along the path, and numerous power poles were snapped. Fifteen people sustained injuries, most of them minor.						
EF2	Whitfield	Sumter	AL	32.3633°N 88.0894°W	13:07–13:09	1.5 mi (2.4 km)	600 yd (550 m)
EF2	One house was destroyed and seven more were damaged near the Whitfield community. Five outbuildings were damaged, and a couple hundred trees were snapped or uprooted. One person was injured.						
EF0	Demopolis	Marengo	AL	32.4813°N 87.8567°W	13:32–13:36	2.75 mi (4.43 km)	250 yd (230 m)
EF0	About 20 houses and several businesses sustained minor damage, several business signs were blown down along U.S. 80, and the Central Farmers COOP building sustained significant structural damage.						
EF0	SW of Thomasville	Clarke	AL	31.9000°N 87.7518°W	15:00–15:01	0.25 mi (400 m)	50 yd (46 m)
EF0	A brief tornado in a wooded area snapped a few 6-inch (15 cm) diameter pine trees.						
EF1	Montgomery	Montgomery	AL	32.3867°N 86.2184°W	17:08–17:10	0.88 mi (1.42 km)	75 yd (69 m)
EF1	A brief tornado on the northeast side of the city caused damage to Alabama Christian Academy, primarily the football field where a section of bleachers collapsed. The scoreboard at the Faulkner University baseball field collapsed, several homes sustained minor roof damage, and numerous mobile homes sustained minor to moderate roof damage or had the underpinning blown out. Several small sheds and outbuildings were damaged, a section of metal roof was peeled back at a motorsports business, and numerous trees were snapped or uprooted, one of which crushed a vehicle.						
EF2	SSE of Notasulga, AL to Auburn, AL to Hamilton, GA to NE of Shiloh, GA	Macon (AL), Lee (AL), Harris (GA), Talbot (GA)	AL, GA	32.5369°N 85.6566°W	17:52–19:12	61.51 mi (98.99 km)	880 yd (800 m)
EF2	A long-lived tornado began near Notasulga, where a dozen mobile homes were damaged. On the west side of Auburn, dozens of houses and mobile homes were heavily damaged, mainly due to falling trees. A few homes were destroyed, and many more homes were damaged throughout the city of Auburn. Extensive tree damage occurred in the city, and numerous vehicles were damaged or destroyed. Two people were injured when a tree fell on a mobile home. The tornado crossed the southern side of the Auburn University campus, where a veterinary school was damaged and two horses were fatally injured. It then struck Auburn High School, causing damage to the baseball facilities and nearby homes. The tornado passed south of Opelika and crossed Interstate 85, continuing to damage homes while heading toward Lake Harding, where several homes and boathouses sustained significant damage. The tornado was rated EF1 in Alabama but intensified to EF2 as it approached Hamilton, where two homes were completely destroyed and 68 homes and other structures sustained minor to moderate damage, 22 of which were county-owned buildings. The damaged county buildings damaged included the Harris County School Complex, the 911 center, the animal shelter, and the agricultural center. A mobile home was heavily damaged as well, with minor injuries to two people. Hundreds of trees were downed along the path, along with numerous power lines. In total, four people were injured by the tornado.						
EF1	NE of Shelby	Cleveland	NC	35.318°N 81.498°W	21:25–21:26	0.35 mi (560 m)	50 yd (46 m)
EF1	Several homes sustained minor damage, and several trees were downed.						
EF0	Hephzibah	Richmond	GA	33.3200°N 82.0827°W	21:53–21:57	1.14 mi (1.83 km)	40 yd (37 m)
EF0	A brief tornado was caught on camera; a few trees were downed.						
EF0	E of Union	Union	SC	34.704°N 81.567°W	22:06–22:07	0.09 mi (140 m)	50 yd (46 m)
EF0	Shingles were removed from a house, part of the roof was blown off a barn, and numerous trees were snapped or uprooted.						
EF2	E of Lowrys to SW of Rock Hill	Chester, York	SC	34.8095°N 81.2010°W	22:30–22:41	7.19 mi (11.57 km)	200 yd (180 m)
EF2	3 deaths – This tornado began near Lowrys, downing trees and partially removing the roof from a home. After crossing into York County, it intensified as it approached the Ogden community. Multiple homes and mobile homes were heavily damaged or destroyed in the area, with one double-wide being rolled 75 yards (69 m), resulting in two fatalities. The third fatality occurred after the roof of a home was blown off and the chimney collapsed inside the house. Numerous barns, sheds, and outbuildings were damaged or destroyed, vehicles were flipped, and numerous trees were snapped or uprooted along the path. Five others were injured in the Ogden area. This was the strongest tornado to hit York County in nearly 40 years and was the county's first known killer tornado since 1926.						
EF1	NE of Waynesboro	Burke	GA	33.1431°N 81.9098°W	22:34–22:40	6.53 mi (10.51 km)	100 yd (91 m)
EF1	This tornado began in the Shell Bluff area and moved northeast. Two homes were damaged, along with a garage and two outbuildings. An RV was turned over, and numerous trees were downed.						
EF0	Savannah River Site	Aiken, Barnwell	SC	33.2065°N 81.7545°W	22:53–23:01	7.39 mi (11.89 km)	70 yd (64 m)
EF0	Trees were downed, and outbuildings were overturned.						
EF2	ESE of Linwood to SE of Thomasville	Davidson, Randolph	NC	35.7321°N 80.2103°W	23:05–23:25	12.51 mi (20.13 km)	200 yd (180 m)
EF2	2 deaths – Significant structural damage occurred to many buildings in the area, including a Lowe's distribution center, a gas station, a restaurant, and an arcade. Sixty homes were impacted, of which 25 were destroyed, along with five destroyed businesses. Most of the homes sustained roof and exterior wall damage, with one roof being blown 150 yards (140 m), although a few homes were blown off their foundations. The two fatalities occurred in a home that was blown down a steep embankment. A mobile home was blown about 200 feet (61 m) at one location, and others were damaged in a mobile home park. Along the path, a few vehicles were tossed or flipped, numerous outbuildings were damaged or destroyed, power lines were knocked down, and many trees were downed, some of which fell into homes. After moving into Randolph County, several more homes sustained damage, mainly to roofing and siding. A travel trailer was flipped, a truck was blown a few yards, an outbuilding was destroyed, and a barn was damaged as well. Over a dozen structures were damaged in the county before the tornado dissipated. Fifteen people were injured in Davidson County.						
EF1	S of Dry Fork	Pittsylvania	VA	36.725°N 79.427°W	23:55–23:58	2.59 mi (4.17 km)	125 yd (114 m)
EF1	Two homes sustained roof damage, three large ventilator systems were ripped of the roof of an industrial building, and two tractor trailers were overturned. Water tanks were tossed, and numerous trees were snapped or uprooted.						
EF1	SSE of Dixie Union	Ware	GA	31.27°N 82.44°W	01:40–01:41	0.24 mi (390 m)	200 yd (180 m)
EF1	A gazebo lost its roof, a porch and carports were damaged, a mobile home was pushed slightly off of its foundation, and a shed was thrown a short distance and destroyed.						
EF0	NW of Como	Hertford	NC	36.53°N 77.11°W	04:14–04:16	1.67 mi (2.69 km)	50 yd (46 m)
EF0	Numerous trees were snapped or uprooted, two tractor trailers were overturned, and a field of unharvested soybean crop was flattened.						

=== November 21 event ===
List of confirmed tornadoes – Monday, November 21, 2011
EF#	Location	County / Parish	State	Start Coord.	Time (UTC)	Path length	Max width
EF0	SW of Horatio	Little River, Sevier	AR	33.8887°N 94.4157°W	03:12–03:17	2.7 mi (4.3 km)	75 yd (69 m)
EF0	Shingles were removed from a house, and numerous trees were snapped.						

== December ==
Confirmed tornadoes by Enhanced Fujita rating
EFU	EF0	EF1	EF2	EF3	EF4	EF5	Total
0	7	6	1	1	0	0	15

=== December 20 event ===
List of confirmed tornadoes – Tuesday, December 20, 2011
EF#	Location	County / Parish	State	Start Coord.	Time (UTC)	Path length	Max width
EF1	DeQuincy	Calcasieu	LA	30.4493°N 93.4417°W	14:25–14:26	0.75 mi (1.21 km)	10 yd (9.1 m)
EF1	Part of the roof was torn from DeQuincy Memorial Hospital, and three vehicles in the hospital parking lot were damaged. Trees and power lines were downed as well.						

=== December 21 event ===
List of confirmed tornadoes – Wednesday, December 21, 2011
EF#	Location	County / Parish	State	Start Coord.	Time (UTC)	Path length	Max width
EF0	S of Graham	Randolph	AL	33.4214°N 85.3201°W	18:32–18:33	0.26 mi (420 m)	88 yd (80 m)
EF0	A brief tornado caused roof damage to a home and several outbuildings and downed several trees.						

=== December 22 event ===
List of confirmed tornadoes – Thursday, December 22, 2011
EF#	Location	County / Parish	State	Start Coord.	Time (UTC)	Path length	Max width
EF1	N of Slaughter	East Feliciana	LA	30.7235°N 91.1578°W	14:15–14:20	2.98 mi (4.80 km)	30 yd (27 m)
EF1	This tornado tracked northeast on an intermittent path before dissipating. Several homes sustained minor roof damage, and several trees were downed, with a few on power lines.						
EF0	SE of Brent	Bibb	AL	32.9053°N 87.1229°W	18:56–18:57	0.06 mi (97 m)	25 yd (23 m)
EF0	A brief tornado uprooted several large pine trees south of Centreville.						
EF0	N of Lawley	Bibb	AL	32.8692°N 86.9742°W	19:25–19:28	2.62 mi (4.22 km)	150 yd (140 m)
EF0	Numerous trees were snapped or uprooted, and large limbs were broken off.						
EF0	E of Selma	Dallas	AL	32.4232°N 86.9206°W	19:30–19:33	2.17 mi (3.49 km)	50 yd (46 m)
EF0	Two mobile homes sustained roof damage, and a third was shifted off its foundation blocks. One outbuilding was destroyed, and several trees were snapped or uprooted.						
EF0	Columbiana	Shelby	AL	33.1828°N 86.6070°W	19:42–19:45	1.82 mi (2.93 km)	50 yd (46 m)
EF0	About 50 trees were snapped or uprooted, with two falling on and damaging homes. Another home sustained minor shingle damage.						
EF0	NE of Old Kingston to E of Marbury	Autauga, Elmore	AL	32.6203°N 86.5478°W	20:02–20:16	10.18 mi (16.38 km)	100 yd (91 m)
EF0	A mobile home and several outbuildings suffered significant damage, and many trees were downed.						
EF1	NNE of Titus to NW of Alexander City	Elmore, Coosa, Tallapoosa	AL	32.7438°N 86.2996°W	20:24–20:53	24.9 mi (40.1 km)	300 yd (270 m)
EF1	Damage occurred along an intermittent path, with approximately 50 trees snapped in Elmore County. In Coosa County, hundreds of trees were snapped, a large metal building was destroyed, and a home suffered minor damage. A few more trees were downed in Tallapoosa County before the tornado dissipated.						
EF2	Coosa to NNE of Rome	Floyd	GA	34.2463°N 85.3420°W	21:50–21:56	12.69 mi (20.42 km)	200 yd (180 m)
EF2	At least 20 houses were damaged, some heavily. Many trees and power lines were downed, and traffic signals were blown down as well. Three people sustained minor injuries in one of the damaged homes.						
EF3	SE of Plainville to ESE of Calhoun	Floyd, Bartow, Gordon	GA	34.3753°N 85.0146°W	22:03–22:18	11.42 mi (18.38 km)	880 yd (800 m)
EF3	This strong tornado formed shortly after the previous EF2 tornado dissipated. One house was destroyed, and several others were damaged, some severely. Many trees were downed along the path, some of which fell on homes. I-75 was briefly blocked by trees south of Calhoun. Four people were injured.						
EF1	SE of Carters	Gilmer	GA	34.5748°N 84.6465°W	22:32–22:34	1.5 mi (2.4 km)	300 yd (270 m)
EF1	At least 100 trees and six power poles were downed south of Carters Lake, with some trees falling on and damaging a church.						
EF1	NE of Grantville	Coweta	GA	33.2664°N 84.7997°W	22:44–22:46	1.07 mi (1.72 km)	100 yd (91 m)
EF1	A house sustained substantial roof damage, and dozens of trees were snapped or uprooted.						
EF1	SSE of Woolsey	Fayette	GA	33.3375°N 84.4120°W	23:16–23:18	1.64 mi (2.64 km)	100 yd (91 m)
EF1	A tornado with estimated peak winds of 95 mph (153 km/h) began on the north shore of Lake Horton. Two homes sustained minor roof damage, a barn and an outbuilding were destroyed, and about three dozen trees were downed.						
EF0	NW of Fayetteville	Fayette	GA	33.5115°N 84.5409°W	23:18–23:21	2.91 mi (4.68 km)	200 yd (180 m)
EF0	A tornado with estimated peak winds of 80 mph (130 km/h) associated with the same circulation as the EF1 tornado in Coweta County moved through the northern part of Fayette County. Approximately 50 trees were downed, six power poles were snapped, and a house lost several shingles, a few gutters, and a portion of the flashing on its roof. Near the house, a wooden fence was destroyed by falling trees.						

== See also ==
- Tornadoes of 2011
- List of United States tornadoes from September to October 2011
- List of United States tornadoes from January to February 2012
