= Coon Lake =

Lake in the state of Minnesota, United States

- Location within Minnesota
- Location: Anoka County, Minnesota
- Coordinates: 45°18′N 93°10′W
- Type: lake
- Surface area: 1,481.24 acres (599.44 ha)
- Average depth: 10 feet (3.0 m)
- Max. depth: 27 feet (8.2 m)
- Shore length^{1}: 16.28 miles (26.20 km)
- Website: https://www.dnr.state.mn.us/lakefind/lake.html?id=02004200
- ^{1} Shore length is not a well-defined measure.

Coon Lake is a lake in Anoka County, Minnesota, in the United States. Coon Lake was named from the fact the lakefront area was a popular hunting ground of raccoons.

== Geology ==
Northern Pike and Bluegill are the most prominent fish for anglers to find in the lake. Both species have large populations, but are small in size. Fishermen can practice on boats or from the shore from specific locations and with required permits.

Two boat launches exist on the lake, one ran by the Minnesota Department of Natural Resources and one by the Anoka County government.
