= Newlin, Texas =

Unincorporated community in Texas, US

Newlin
- Interactive map of Newlin
- Coordinates: 34°35′23″N 100°26′39″W
- Country: United States of America
- State: Texas
- County (United States): Hall County
- Elevation: 1,798 ft (548 m)

Newlin is an unincorporated community in Hall County in the U.S. state of Texas.

The Newlin Cemetery is located at 34°36′20″N 100°26′45″W.
