= Calvert, Kansas =

Unincorporated community in Norton County, Kansas

Coordinates: 39°50′59″N 99°45′28″W

Calvert is an unincorporated community in Norton County, Kansas, United States.

== History ==
A post office was opened in Calvert in 1885, and remained in operation until it was discontinued in 1953.
