= Maza =

Maza may refer to:

== People ==
- Ada Maza (born 1958), Argentine politician
- Alfredo del Mazo Maza (born 1975), Mexican politician
- Ángel Maza (born 1954), Argentine politician
- Antonio de la Maza (1912–1961), Dominican businessman and conspirator in the assassination of Rafael Trujillo
- Bernardino Pérez Maza, Spanish basketball coach and player
- Bob Maza (1939–2000), Australian actor and playwright
- Carlos Maza, American journalist and video producer
- Diana Maza (born 1984), Ecuadorian judoka
- Domingo Maza Zavala (1922–2010), Venezuelan economist
- Francisco Javier Rodríguez (born 1981), Mexican football player, known as "Maza"
- Jackie Mason (Yacov Moshe Maza, 1928–2021), American comedian and actor
- Jason Maza (born 1987), English actor and producer
- Jonathan Maza (born 1998), Argentine footballer
- José Maza Fernández (1889–1964), Chilean politician, lawyer, and diplomat
- José Maza Sancho (born 1948), Chilean astronomer and astrophysicist
- José Manuel Maza (1951–2017), Spanish lawyer, criminologist and writer
- Juan Agustín Maza (1784–1830), Argentine politician and lawyer
- Liza Maza (born 1957), Filipina activist
- Luis Maza (born 1980), Venezuelan baseball player
- Manuel Vicente Maza (1779–1839), Argentine politician
- Margarita Maza (1826–1871), First Lady of Mexico
- María José Maza (born 1990), Ecuadorian model
- Maza (footballer) (born 1997), João José Jone Bonde, Mozambican footballer
- Miguel Ángel Maza (born 1993), Spanish footballer
- Miguel Maza Márquez (born 1937), Colombian general
- Miller Maza, Nigerian Anglican bishop
- Rachael Maza (born 1965), Australian actress
- Roland de la Maza (born 1971), American baseball player
- Ronny Maza (born 1997), Venezuelan footballer
- Rubén Maza (born 1967), Venezuelan long-distance runner
- Regino Sainz de la Maza (1896–1981), Spanish guitarist
- Sarah Maza, American historian

== Places ==
- Máza, a village in Baranya county, Hungary
- Maza, Crete, a village on the Greek island of Crete
- Maza, North Dakota, a city in Towner County

== Food ==
- Meze, an array of appetizers in Middle Eastern cuisine
- A product made from kneaded barley dough in Ancient Greek cuisine

== Other uses ==
- 108113 Maza, an asteroid named for José Maza Sancho
- Elisa Maza, a fictional character in the Disney animated series Gargoyles
- MazaCoin, a cryptocurrency
- Maza language, a Lolo-Burmese language spoken by the Yi people of China
- Maza of the Moon, a 1930 science fiction novel by Otis Adelbert Kline
- "Maza", the 2021 single version of Inna's 2020 song "Maza Jaja"

== See also ==
- Mazas, a surname
