= 1896 United States presidential election in North Dakota =

- November 3, 1896

Nominee	William McKinley	William Jennings Bryan
Party	Republican	Democratic
Home state	Ohio	Nebraska
Running mate	Garret Hobart	Arthur Sewall
Electoral vote	3	0
Popular vote	26,335	20,686
Percentage	55.57%	43.65%
County results
McKinley
40–50%
50–60%
60–70%
70–80%
80–90%
Bryan
50–60%
60–70%
President before election
Grover Cleveland
Democratic
Elected President
William McKinley
Republican

The 1896 United States presidential election in North Dakota took place on November 3, 1896. All contemporary 45 states were part of the 1896 United States presidential election. Voters chose three electors to the Electoral College, which selected the president and vice president.

Although the state had been carried by a Democratic-Populist fusion ticket in 1892, unlike the other Mountain and Plains states, North Dakota was largely Catholic and Lutheran, and opposed Populist and Democratic nominee William Jennings Bryan's Evangelical Protestantism. In spite of the fact that this predominantly wheat-growing state was severely hit by drought, high interest rates and problems of poor transportation, hostility to Bryan’s fundamentalism amongst the Russian-Germans of the southern part of the state was intense, while the Catholic Church under the influence of John Ireland also condemned Bryan’s free silver policy at the same time as Bryan toured North Dakota in October. There was also fear that if Bryan were elected, the nation would split as severely as it had in 1861 after the election of Abraham Lincoln. Archbishop Ireland claimed that Bryan’s election might create class war.

For these reasons, Bryan was able to carry only the rural Scandinavian-American counties in the Red River Valley and the north of the state adjacent to Minnesota and Canada. In the predominantly German remainder of the state, Republican nominees, former Ohio Governor William McKinley and his running mate Garret Hobart of New Jersey established a Republican dominance of the state’s presidential politics that would prove permanent except during the Prohibition and New Deal era.

McKinley won North Dakota by a margin of 11.92 percentage points, becoming the first Republican presidential candidate to win the state. He repeated this much more decisively four years later. Bryan would also later lose the state to William Howard Taft in 1908. Bryan would be the only Democrat to carry any of North Dakota's counties until Woodrow Wilson in 1912, and the only one to obtain a majority in a North Dakota county until Wilson in 1916. This is the only election in which North Dakota and Kansas did not choose the same candidate. (Note: In 1892, when Kansas gave all its votes to James B. Weaver, North Dakota, although giving a plurality to Weaver, split its votes one each between Weaver, Democrat Grover Cleveland and Republican Benjamin Harrison.)

== Results ==
General election results
Party	Pledged to	Elector	Votes
Republican Party	William McKinley	Charles Wheeler	26,335
Republican Party	William McKinley	Charles F. Wilbur	25,620
Republican Party	William McKinley	Nels H. Dyste	25,513
Democratic Party & People's Party	William Jennings Bryan	Daniel F. Siegfried	20,686
Democratic Party & People's Party	William Jennings Bryan	Eli C. D. Shortridge	20,325
Democratic Party & People's Party	William Jennings Bryan	Charles A. Digness	20,088
Prohibition Party	Joshua Levering	E. A. Taylor	358
Prohibition Party	Joshua Levering	Torger F. Hov	304
Prohibition Party	Joshua Levering	D. Carlton	290
Write-in		Scattering	12
Votes cast (Note: Based on totals for highest elector on each ticket)			47,391

=== Results by county ===
County	William McKinley Republican		William Jennings Bryan Democratic		John Granville Woolley Prohibition		Margin		Total votes cast
County	#	%	#	%	#	%	#	%	Total votes cast
Barnes	986	49.62%	977	49.17%	24	1.21%	9	0.45%	1,987
Benson	549	70.11%	227	28.99%	7	0.89%	322	41.12%	783
Billings	78	73.58%	27	25.47%	1	0.94%	51	48.11%	106
Bottineau	369	48.36%	389	50.98%	5	0.66%	-20	-2.62%	763
Burleigh	729	68.13%	338	31.59%	3	0.28%	391	36.54%	1,070
Cass	3,050	58.80%	2,089	40.27%	48	0.93%	961	18.53%	5,187
Cavalier	730	38.42%	1,158	60.95%	12	0.63%	-428	-22.53%	1,900
Dickey	619	51.07%	587	48.43%	6	0.50%	32	2.64%	1,212
Eddy	278	53.15%	243	46.46%	2	0.38%	35	6.69%	523
Emmons	300	63.69%	168	35.67%	3	0.64%	132	28.03%	471
Foster	216	59.83%	143	39.61%	2	0.55%	73	20.22%	361
Grand Forks	2,432	55.72%	1,893	43.37%	40	0.92%	539	12.35%	4,365
Griggs	318	46.42%	360	52.55%	7	1.02%	-42	-6.13%	685
Kidder	176	62.86%	104	37.14%	0	0.00%	72	25.71%	280
LaMoure	460	53.30%	401	46.47%	2	0.23%	59	6.84%	863
Logan	70	73.68%	25	26.32%	0	0.00%	45	47.37%	95
McHenry	217	56.51%	166	43.23%	1	0.26%	51	13.28%	384
McIntosh	336	83.58%	66	16.42%	0	0.00%	270	67.16%	402
McLean	124	61.08%	79	38.92%	0	0.00%	45	22.17%	203
Mercer	115	80.42%	28	19.58%	0	0.00%	87	60.84%	143
Morton	752	65.51%	393	34.23%	3	0.26%	359	31.27%	1,148
Nelson	616	50.45%	603	49.39%	2	0.16%	13	1.06%	1,221
Oliver	59	50.43%	58	49.57%	0	0.00%	1	0.85%	117
Pembina	1,687	47.57%	1,807	50.96%	52	1.47%	-120	-3.38%	3,546
Pierce	222	74.50%	75	25.17%	1	0.34%	147	49.33%	298
Ramsey	869	55.78%	665	42.68%	12	0.77%	204	13.09%	1,558 (Note: 12 write-in votes were recorded from this county.)
Ransom	766	56.49%	579	42.70%	11	0.81%	187	13.79%	1,356
Richland	1,843	61.13%	1,160	38.47%	12	0.40%	683	22.65%	3,015
Rolette	306	47.44%	331	51.32%	8	1.24%	-25	-3.88%	645
Sargent	587	47.84%	636	51.83%	4	0.33%	-49	-3.99%	1,227
Stark	530	70.86%	216	28.88%	2	0.27%	314	41.98%	748
Steele	572	63.49%	322	35.74%	7	0.78%	250	27.75%	901
Stutsman	705	54.44%	578	44.63%	12	0.93%	127	9.81%	1,295
Towner	303	42.74%	394	55.57%	12	1.69%	-91	-12.83%	709
Traill	1,673	70.68%	674	28.47%	20	0.84%	999	42.21%	2,367
Walsh	1,707	44.18%	2,134	55.23%	23	0.60%	-427	-11.05%	3,864
Ward	299	60.28%	193	38.91%	4	0.81%	106	21.37%	496
Wells	584	64.25%	317	34.87%	8	0.88%	267	29.37%	909
Williams	103	54.79%	83	44.15%	2	1.06%	20	10.64%	188
Totals	26,335	55.57%	20,686	43.65%	358	0.76%	5,649	11.92%	47,391

== See also ==
- United States presidential elections in North Dakota
