= Egeland, North Dakota =

City in North Dakota, United States

- City
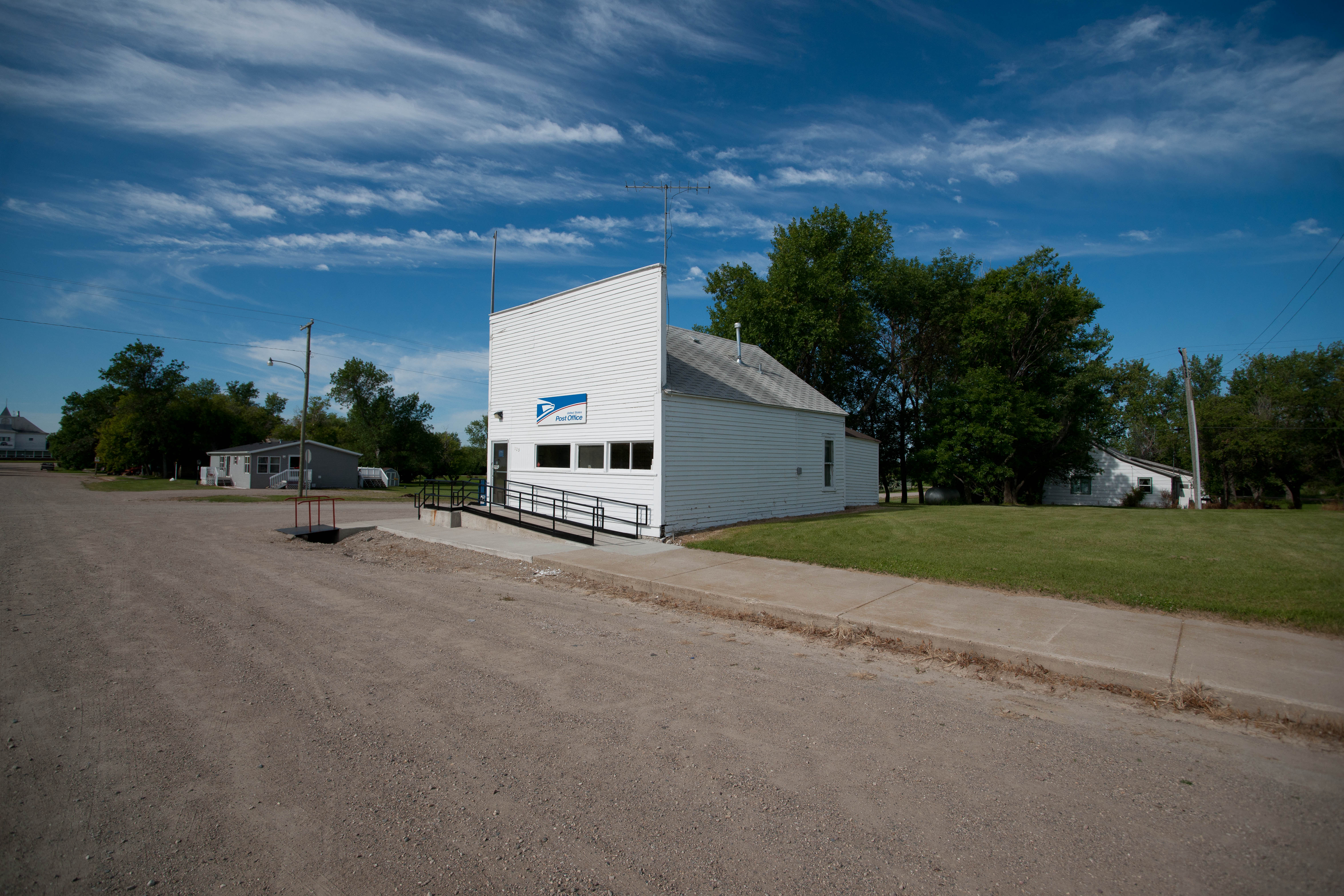
- Post office in Egeland

- Location of Egeland, North Dakota
- Coordinates: 48°37′41″N 99°05′52″W
- Country: United States
- State: North Dakota
- County: Towner
- Founded: 1905

Area
  - Total: 0.32 sq mi (0.83 km^{2})
  - Land: 0.32 sq mi (0.83 km^{2})
  - Water: 0 sq mi (0.00 km^{2})
- Elevation: 1,522 ft (464 m)

Population (2020)
  - Total: 32
  - Density: 100.1/sq mi (38.63/km^{2})
- Time zone: UTC-6 (CST)
  - Summer (DST): UTC-5 (CDT)
- ZIP code: 58331
- Area code: 701
- FIPS code: 38-22540
- GNIS feature ID: 1036019

Egeland is a city in Towner County, North Dakota, United States. The population was 32 at the 2020 census. Egeland was founded in 1905.

== Geography ==
According to the United States Census Bureau, the city has a total area of 0.38 square miles (0.98 km^{2}), all land.

== Demographics ==
Historical population
Census	Pop.	Note	%±
1910	266		—
1920	306		15.0%
1930	333		8.8%
1940	275		−17.4%
1950	248		−9.8%
1960	190		−23.4%
1970	96		−49.5%
1980	112		16.7%
1990	103		−8.0%
2000	49		−52.4%
2010	28		−42.9%
2020	32		14.3%
2021 (est.)	32		0.0%
U.S. Decennial Census; 2020 Census

=== 2010 census ===
As of the census of 2010, there were 28 people, 17 households, and 7 families residing in the city. The population density was 73.7 inhabitants per square mile (28.5/km^{2}). There were 42 housing units at an average density of 110.5 per square mile (42.7/km^{2}). The racial makeup of the city was 89.3% White and 10.7% Native American.

There were 17 households, of which 11.8% had children under the age of 18 living with them, 35.3% were married couples living together, 5.9% had a female householder with no husband present, and 58.8% were non-families. 52.9% of all households were made up of individuals, and 41.2% had someone living alone who was 65 years of age or older. The average household size was 1.65 and the average family size was 2.43.

The median age in the city was 60.5 years. 10.7% of residents were under the age of 18; 0.0% were between the ages of 18 and 24; 7.2% were from 25 to 44; 50% were from 45 to 64; and 32.1% were 65 years of age or older. The gender makeup of the city was 57.1% male and 42.9% female.

=== 2000 census ===
As of the census of 2000, there were 49 people, 21 households, and 14 families residing in the city. The population density was 125.7 inhabitants per square mile (48.5/km^{2}). There were 48 housing units at an average density of 123.1 per square mile (47.5/km^{2}). The racial makeup of the city was 89.80% White and 10.20% Native American.

There were 21 households, out of which 33.3% had children under the age of 18 living with them, 42.9% were married couples living together, 14.3% had a female householder with no husband present, and 33.3% were non-families. 33.3% of all households were made up of individuals, and 23.8% had someone living alone who was 65 years of age or older. The average household size was 2.33 and the average family size was 2.86.

In the city, the population was spread out, with 26.5% under the age of 18, 4.1% from 18 to 24, 22.4% from 25 to 44, 18.4% from 45 to 64, and 28.6% who were 65 years of age or older. The median age was 44 years. For every 100 females, there were 81.5 males. For every 100 females age 18 and over, there were 80.0 males.

The median income for a household in the city was $23,125, and the median income for a family was $34,375. Males had a median income of $21,250 versus $16,250 for females. The per capita income for the city was $10,217. There were no families and 11.8% of the population living below the poverty line, including no under eighteens and 33.3% of those over 64.

== Education ==
Its school district is North Star Schools in Cando.

The first school in the community opened in 1907. It was a part of the Bisbee School District until 1980, when it became part of the Bisbee-Egeland School District. In 2002 the school in Egeland closed with students moved to Bisbee. The Towner County Historical Society took control of the Egeland School. In 2008 the Bisbee-Egeland district closed and consolidated into the Cando School District to form the North Star district.
