= Southam, North Dakota =

Unincorporated community in North Dakota, US

Southam
- Unincorporated community
- Location within the state of North Dakota Southam (the United States)
- Coordinates: 48°09′30″N 98°33′07″W
- Country: United States
- State: North Dakota
- County: Ramsey
- Elevation: 458 ft (140 m)
- Time zone: UTC-6 (Central (CST))
  - Summer (DST): UTC-5 (CDT)
- Area code: 701
- GNIS feature ID: 1032208

Southam is an unincorporated community in Ramsey County, in the U.S. state of North Dakota.

== Geography ==
Southam is located 10 miles (16 km) from Devils Lake, the county seat. It is in Ontario Township.

== History ==
Southam was originally a rail station built on the Soo Line in 1912. The Southam post office was established on May 17, 1913. Martin Johnson was the first postmaster.

The derivation of the name Southam is unclear: the community was named after someone in the Southam family, either Fred Southam or his daughter. Fred Southam was an area landowner.

The population was 200 in 1920. It was 117 in 1940, and was 60 in 1960. The post office closed in 1965.

== See also ==
- Webster, North Dakota
