= Bisbee, North Dakota =

City in North Dakota, United States

Bisbee
- City
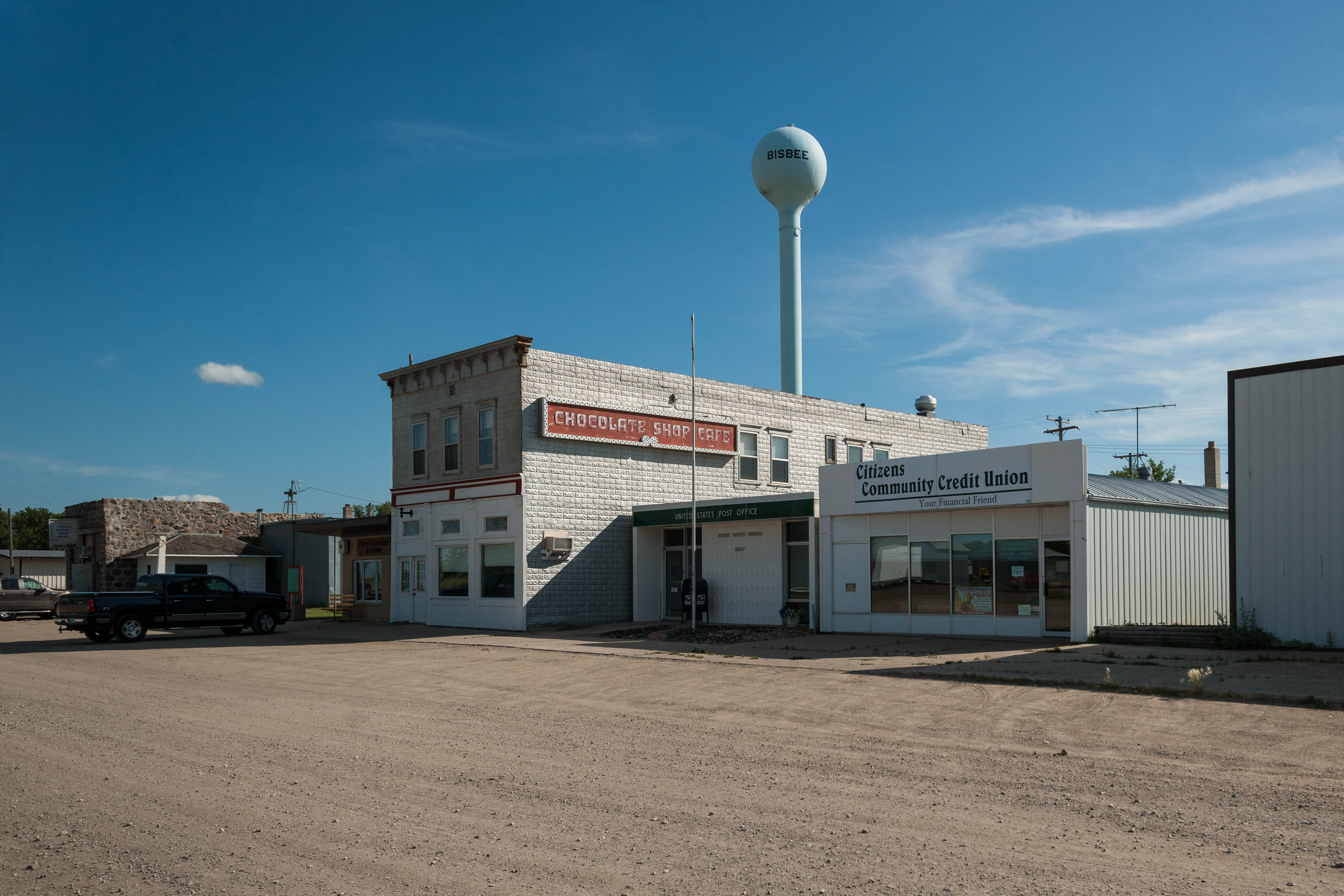
- Business district of Bisbee

- Location of Bisbee, North Dakota
- Coordinates: 48°37′33″N 99°22′47″W
- Country: United States
- State: North Dakota
- County: Towner
- Founded: 1888

Area
  - Total: 0.30 sq mi (0.78 km^{2})
  - Land: 0.30 sq mi (0.78 km^{2})
  - Water: 0 sq mi (0.00 km^{2})
- Elevation: 1,594 ft (486 m)

Population (2020)
  - Total: 110
  - Estimate (2022): 102
  - Density: 366.0/sq mi (141.31/km^{2})
- Time zone: UTC-6 (Central (CST))
  - Summer (DST): UTC-5 (CDT)
- ZIP code: 58317
- Area code: 701
- FIPS code: 38-07180
- GNIS feature ID: 1035933

Bisbee is a city in Towner County, North Dakota, United States. The population was 110 at the 2020 census. Bisbee was founded in 1888.

== History ==
The town was named after Colonel Andrew Bisbee, a native of Peru, Maine. Bisbee, a veteran of the Civil War who came to Towner County in 1885. In 1890 he was chosen by the county commissioners of Towner County to solicit drought relief and was elected to a term in the North Dakota Senate. Col. Bisbee donated a portion of the townsite of Bisbee, as well donating land for the railroads to pass through the village.

== Geography ==
According to the United States Census Bureau, the city has a total area of 0.26 square miles (0.67 km^{2}), all land.

=== Climate ===
This climatic region is typified by large seasonal temperature differences, with warm to hot (and often humid) summers and cold (sometimes severely cold) winters. According to the Köppen Climate Classification system, Bisbee has a humid continental climate, abbreviated "Dfb" on climate maps.

== Culture ==
Bisbee was featured in the September 10, 2001 edition of Newsweek, discussing the slow, painful decline of the town since (at that time) even the mayor, Bob Weltin, was preparing to forsake what was left of the town and seek a better life elsewhere. Things Bisbee had lost over the years, according to the Newsweek article, included movies at Pettsinger's Theater, root-beer floats at Brannon's Drug and Soda Fountain, and groceries at Dick's Red Owl. At the time of the article, there wasn't a doctor, lawyer, plumber or priest in Bisbee anymore. Population had dropped more than 30 percent in a decade. At the time of the article, there were only 227 "hearty souls" hanging on for dear life in Bisbee.

== Demographics ==
Historical population
Census	Pop.	Note	%±
1910	444		—
1920	500		12.6%
1930	531		6.2%
1940	393		−26.0%
1950	365		−7.1%
1960	388		6.3%
1970	305		−21.4%
1980	257		−15.7%
1990	227		−11.7%
2000	167		−26.4%
2010	126		−24.6%
2020	110		−12.7%
2022 (est.)	102		−7.3%
U.S. Decennial Census; 2020 Census

=== 2010 census ===
As of the census of 2010, there were 126 people, 63 households, and 31 families residing in the city. The population density was 484.6 inhabitants per square mile (187.1/km^{2}). There were 97 housing units at an average density of 373.1 per square mile (144.1/km^{2}). The racial makeup of the city was 96.0% White and 4.0% Native American. Hispanic or Latino of any race were 0.8% of the population.

There were 63 households, of which 19.0% had children under the age of 18 living with them, 38.1% were married couples living together, 4.8% had a female householder with no husband present, 6.3% had a male householder with no wife present, and 50.8% were non-families. 46.0% of all households were made up of individuals, and 22.2% had someone living alone who was 65 years of age or older. The average household size was 2.00 and the average family size was 2.84.

The median age in the city was 49 years. 17.5% of residents were under the age of 18; 5.6% were between the ages of 18 and 24; 20.6% were from 25 to 44; 33.2% were from 45 to 64; and 23% were 65 years of age or older. The gender makeup of the city was 53.2% male and 46.8% female.

=== 2000 census ===
As of the census of 2000, there were 167 people, 82 households, and 39 families residing in the city. The population density was 624.2 inhabitants per square mile (241.0/km^{2}). There were 102 housing units at an average density of 381.3 per square mile (147.2/km^{2}). The racial makeup of the city was 97.01% White, 0.60% African American, 1.20% Native American, and 1.20% from two or more races.

There were 82 households, out of which 22.0% had children under the age of 18 living with them, 41.5% were married couples living together, 6.1% had a female householder with no husband present, and 52.4% were non-families. 48.8% of all households were made up of individuals, and 26.8% had someone living alone who was 65 years of age or older. The average household size was 2.04 and the average family size was 3.05.

In the city, the population was spread out, with 22.2% under the age of 18, 6.0% from 18 to 24, 21.6% from 25 to 44, 26.3% from 45 to 64, and 24.0% who were 65 years of age or older. The median age was 45 years. For every 100 females, there were 94.2 males. For every 100 females age 18 and over, there were 88.4 males.

The median income for a household in the city was $30,000, and the median income for a family was $37,188. Males had a median income of $21,875 versus $12,292 for females. The per capita income for the city was $17,610. About 15.4% of families and 13.7% of the population were below the poverty line, including 21.4% of those under the age of eighteen and 10.0% of those 65 or over.

== Education ==
Its school district is North Star Schools in Cando.

It was a part of the Bisbee School District until 1980, when it became part of the Bisbee-Egeland School District. In 2008 that district closed and consolidated into Cando schools.
