= Lake Alice National Wildlife Refuge =

Protected area in North Dakota, United States

- IUCN category IV (habitat/species management area)
- Location within the United States
- Location: Ramsey, Towner counties, North Dakota, United States
- Nearest city: Church's Ferry, North Dakota
- Coordinates: 48°20′49″N 99°06′50″W
- Area: 12,179 acres (49.29 km^{2})
- Established: 1935
- Governing body: U.S. Fish and Wildlife Service
- Website: Lake Alice National Wildlife Refuge

Lake Alice National Wildlife Refuge is located in Ramsey and Towner Counties near the town of Church's Ferry, North Dakota. These watersheds cover 1,000 square miles (2,600 km^{2}) of land and provide ample water to Lake Alice National Wildlife Refuge. All of these watercourses are considered intermittent, but they are prone to flooding in spring and during heavy rainstorms.

The Refuge was first established in 1935 as an easement refuge. The Refuge lands were privately owned, and no hunting was allowed. In 1972, the U.S. Fish and Wildlife Service purchased 8,600 acres (35 km^{2}) of the original easement refuge. The Service now manages 12,179 acres (49.29 km^{2}) at Lake Alice National Wildlife Refuge.
