= Towner County, North Dakota =

County in North Dakota, United States

- County
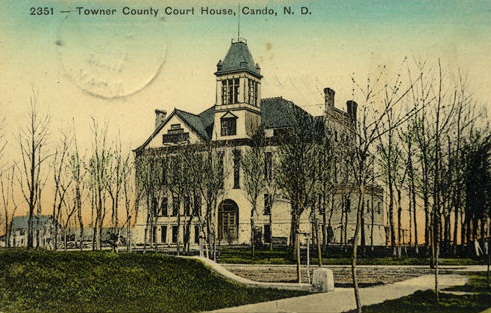
- Postcard. Towner County Courthouse in Cando, North Dakota, a historic Queen Anne-style building.

- Location within the U.S. state of North Dakota
- Coordinates: 48.682183°N 99.248158°W
- Country: United States
- State: North Dakota
- Founded: March 8, 1883 (created); January 24, 1884 (organized)
- Named for: Oscar M. Towner
- Seat: Cando
- Largest city: Cando

Area
  - Total: 1,041.636 sq mi (2,697.82 km^{2})
  - Land: 1,025.113 sq mi (2,655.03 km^{2})
  - Water: 16.523 sq mi (42.79 km^{2}) 1.59%

Population (2020)
  - Total: 2,162
  - Estimate (2025): 2,040 ▼
  - Density: 2.001/sq mi (0.773/km^{2})
- Time zone: UTC−6 (Central)
  - Summer (DST): UTC−5 (CDT)
- Area code: 701
- Congressional district: At-large
- Website: tccounty.com

Towner County is a county in the U.S. state of North Dakota. As of the 2020 census, the population is 2,162, and was estimated to be 2,040 in 2025. The county seat and largest city is Cando. It is south of the Canada–US border with Manitoba.

== History ==
The Dakota Territory legislature created the county on March 8, 1883, with areas partitioned from Cavalier and Rolette counties. It was named for Oscar M. Towner (1842–1897), a businessman and member of the 15th territorial legislature. The county organization was not completed at that time, and the county was attached to Pembina County for judicial and administrative purposes. That lasted until January 24, 1884, when the county organization was effected, and its attachment to Pembina was dissolved. However, on January 26, 1889, the county was attached to Ramsey County for judicial and administrative purposes. This arrangement only lasted a few months. The boundaries of Towner County, as first formed, have not been altered to the present (as of 2019).

The county should not be confused with the city of Towner, which is located in McHenry County.

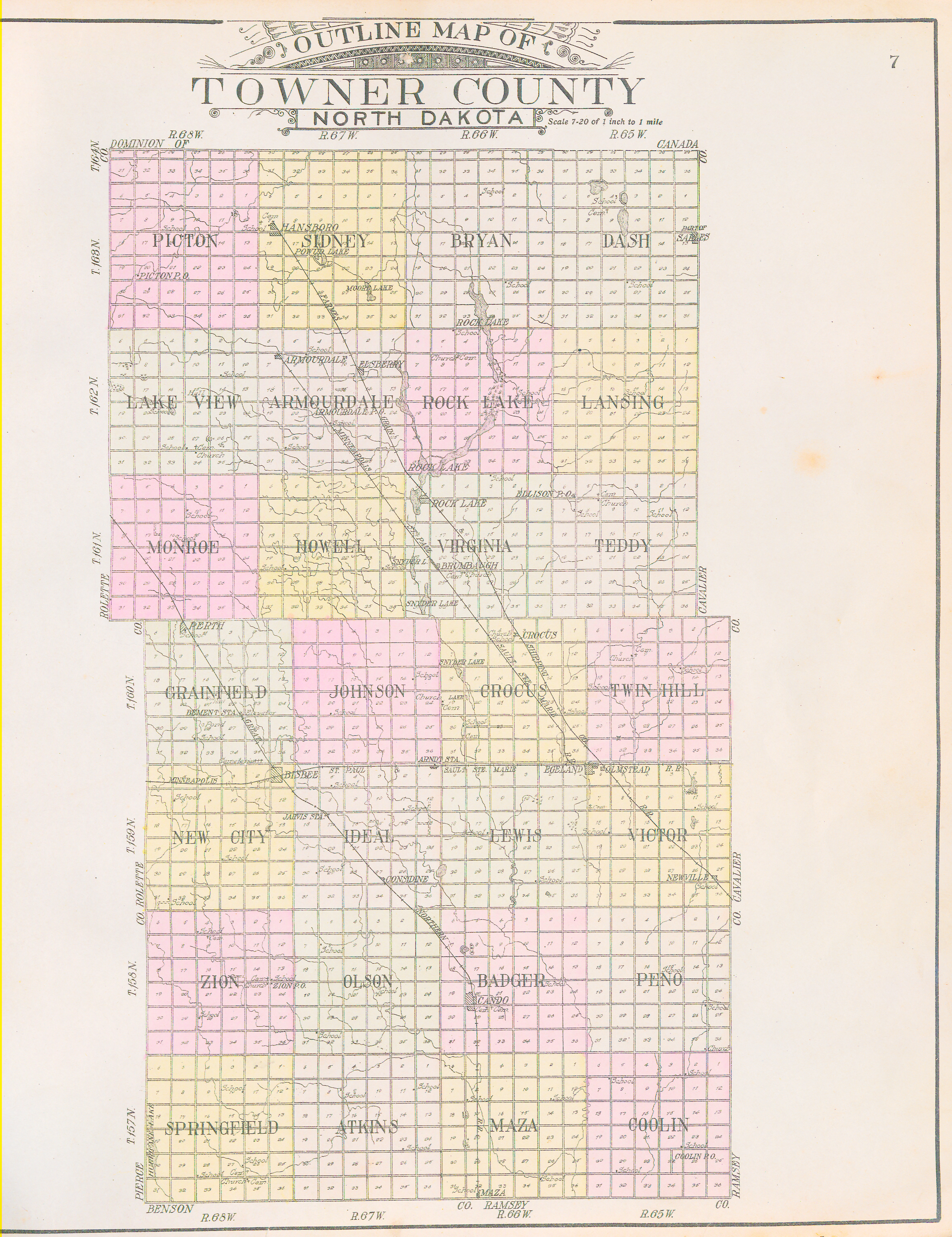
Outline map of Towner County, North Dakota, 1909

== Geography ==
Towner County lies on the north line of North Dakota, and thus on the north line of the continental United States. Its north boundary line abuts the south boundary line of Canada. Its terrain consists of rolling hills dotted with lakes and ponds. The area is devoted to agriculture. The Laurentian Divide runs across Towner County - the northern terrain slopes to the north while the southern terrain slopes to the south, and the county as a whole slightly slopes to the east.

According to the United States Census Bureau, the county has a total area of 1,041.636 square miles (2,697.82 km^{2}), of which 1,025.113 square miles (2,655.03 km^{2}) is land and 16.523 square miles (42.79 km^{2}) (1.59%) is water. It is the 36th largest county in North Dakota by total area.

Towner County, North Dakota Weather Data

Averages use 1901-2000

Records are from 1895–Present

	Avg Temp	Min Temp	Max Temp	Precip
Avg Jan	0.92	-9.39	11.26	0.59
Hist Hi Jan	21.80 2006	14.20 2006	29.50 2006	2.10 1917
Hist Lo Jan	-16.70 1950	-25.40 1950	-8.00 1950	0.02 1973
Avg Feb	6.84	-3.66	8.60	0.43
Hist Hi Feb	24.00 1954	17.40 1998	33.60 1954	2.11 1998
Hist Lo Feb	-17.60 1936	-27.00 1936	-8.30 1936	0.03 1971
Avg Mar	20.54	10.22	30.85	0.75
Hist Hi Mar	38.00 1910	25.70 2012	50.90 1910	3.02 1902
Hist Lo Mar	2.70 1899	-9.90 1899	15.20 1899	0.02 2019
Avg Apr	38.55	26.88	50.22	1.17
Hist Hi Apr	48.20 1987	34.20 2006	64.30 1952	4.19 1896
Hist Lo Apr	25.70 2013	15.80 2013	35.60 2013	0.03 1952
Avg May	51.97	38.54	65.39	2.19
Hist Hi May	63.40 1977	48.50 1977	78.40 1977	6.37 1999
Hist Lo May	41.40 1907	27.90 1907	54.80 1907	0.18 1907
Avg Jun	61.14	48.53	73.75	4.05
Hist Hi Jun	71.70 1988	56.20 1988	87.20 1988	11.08 1954
Hist Lo Jun	53.50 1915	41.70 1969	65.20 1915	0.97 1900
Avg Jul	66.51	53.30	79.73	2.81
Hist Hi Jul	76.50 1936	59.80 1936	93.20 1936	8.48 1993
Hist Lo Jul	59.50 1992	47.90 1915	70.60 1992	0.41 1985
Avg Aug	64.30	50.45	78.14	2.48
Hist Hi Aug	71.50 1983	56.50 1983	88.30 1961	7.57 1980
Hist Lo Aug	57.70 2004	45.30 1977	69.00 2004	0.24 1961
Avg Sep	53.85	40.58	67.12	1.74
Hist Hi Sep	63.30 2009	49.80 2009	78.90 1897	6.16 1941
Hist Lo Sep	44.60 1965	33.80 1965	55.50 1965	0.06 1938
Avg Oct	41.42	29.28	53.55	1.10
Hist Hi Oct	52.50 1963	37.90 1963	67.00 1963	5.16 1994
Hist Lo Oct	29.40 1919	17.90 1919	39.00 1925	0.06 1944
Avg Nov	22.75	13.48	32.03	0.67
Hist Hi Nov	37.80 2016	28.30 2016	47.30 2016	2.93 2000
Hist Lo Nov	2.50 1896	-5.60 1896	10.50 1896	0.02 1939
Avg Dec	7.91	-1.64	17.46	0.59
Hist Hi Dec	22.80 1939	14.70 1997	32.90 1939	1.85 1906
Hist Lo Dec	-5.40 1917	-15.30 1917	4.10 1983	0.01 1954
Avg 12 Mo	36.39	24.71	48.07	1.49
Hi 12 Mo	76.50 Jul 1936	59.80 Jul 1936	93.20 Jul 1936	11.08 Jun 1954
Lo 12 Mo	-17.60 Feb 1936	-27.00 Feb 1936	-8.30 Feb 1936	0.01 Dec 1954

=== Major highways ===
- U.S. Route 281
- North Dakota Highway 4
- North Dakota Highway 5
- North Dakota Highway 17
- North Dakota Highway 66

=== Adjacent counties and rural municipalities ===
- Municipality of Killarney-Turtle Mountain, Manitoba - northwest
- Cartwright-Roblin Municipality, Manitoba - north
- Municipality of Louise, Manitoba - northeast
- Cavalier County - east
- Ramsey County - southeast
- Benson County - south
- Pierce County - southwest
- Rolette County - west

=== National protected areas ===
- Brumba National Wildlife Refuge
- Lake Alice National Wildlife Refuge (part)
- Rock Lake National Wildlife Refuge
- Snyder Lake National Wildlife Refuge

=== Lakes ===
- Armourdale Lake
- Brumba Pool
- Lake Alice (part)
- McLaughlin Lake
- Moore Lake
- Pound Lake
- Rock Lake
- Snyder Lake

== Demographics ==
Historical population
Census	Pop.	Note	%±
1890	1,450		—
1900	6,491		347.7%
1910	8,963		38.1%
1920	8,327		−7.1%
1930	8,393		0.8%
1940	7,200		−14.2%
1950	6,360		−11.7%
1960	5,624		−11.6%
1970	4,645		−17.4%
1980	4,052		−12.8%
1990	3,627		−10.5%
2000	2,876		−20.7%
2010	2,246		−21.9%
2020	2,162		−3.7%
2025 (est.)	2,040	▼	−5.6%
U.S. Decennial Census; 1790–1960 1900–1990; 1990–2000 2010–2020

As of the fourth quarter of 2024, the median home value in Towner County was $130,113.

As of the 2023 American Community Survey, there are 958 estimated households in Towner County with an average of 2.17 persons per household. The county has a median household income of $63,017. Approximately 9.4% of the county's population lives at or below the poverty line. Towner County has an estimated 63.0% employment rate, with 18.9% of the population holding a bachelor's degree or higher and 89.5% holding a high school diploma.

The top five reported ancestries (people were allowed to report up to two ancestries, thus the figures will generally add to more than 100%) were English (97.3%), Spanish (2.2%), Indo-European (0.1%), Asian and Pacific Islander (0.0%), and Other (0.4%).

The median age in the county was 50.3 years.

Towner County, North Dakota – racial and ethnic composition
Note: the US Census treats Hispanic/Latino as an ethnic category. This table excludes Latinos from the racial categories and assigns them to a separate category. Hispanics/Latinos may be of any race.

Race / ethnicity (NH = non-Hispanic)	Pop. 1980	Pop. 1990	Pop. 2000	Pop. 2010	Pop. 2020
White alone (NH)	4,003 (98.79%)	3,562 (98.21%)	2,797 (97.25%)	2,165 (96.39%)	1,984 (91.77%)
Black or African American alone (NH)	3 (0.07%)	2 (0.06%)	2 (0.07%)	2 (0.09%)	2 (0.09%)
Native American or Alaska Native alone (NH)	41 (1.01%)	53 (1.46%)	57 (1.98%)	49 (2.18%)	71 (3.28%)
Asian alone (NH)	3 (0.07%)	5 (0.14%)	2 (0.07%)	1 (0.04%)	10 (0.46%)
Pacific Islander alone (NH)	—	—	0 (0.00%)	0 (0.00%)	1 (0.05%)
Other race alone (NH)	0 (0.00%)	0 (0.00%)	0 (0.00%)	4 (0.18%)	4 (0.19%)
Mixed race or multiracial (NH)	—	—	13 (0.45%)	15 (0.67%)	56 (2.59%)
Hispanic or Latino (any race)	2 (0.05%)	5 (0.14%)	5 (0.17%)	10 (0.45%)	34 (1.57%)
Total	4,052 (100.00%)	3,627 (100.00%)	2,876 (100.00%)	2,246 (100.00%)	2,162 (100.00%)

=== 2024 Estimate ===
As of the 2024 estimate, there were 2,051 people and 958 households residing in the county. There were 1,283 housing units at an average density of 1.25 per square mile (0.5/km^{2}). The racial makeup of the county was 91.0% White (87.8% NH White), 0.5% African American, 5.5% Native American, 0.7% Asian, 0.0% Pacific Islander, _% from some other races and 2.3% from two or more races. Hispanic or Latino people of any race were 3.8% of the population.

=== 2020 census ===
As of the 2020 census, there were 2,162 people, 965 households, and 587 families residing in the county. Of the residents, 22.8% were under the age of 18 and 24.7% were 65 years of age or older; the median age was 51.1 years. For every 100 females there were 105.9 males, and for every 100 females age 18 and over there were 104.4 males.

The population density was 2.11 inhabitants per square mile (0.8/km^{2}). There were 1,290 housing units at an average density of 1.26 per square mile (0.5/km^{2}). Of the housing units, 25.2% were vacant, 77.8% of the occupied units were owner-occupied, and 22.2% were renter-occupied. The homeowner vacancy rate was 0.8% and the rental vacancy rate was 24.8%.

The racial makeup of the county was 91.9% White, 0.1% Black or African American, 3.3% American Indian and Alaska Native, 0.5% Asian, 0.6% from some other race, and 3.6% from two or more races. Hispanic or Latino residents of any race comprised 1.6% of the population.

Of the 965 households, 24.5% had children under the age of 18 living with them and 19.6% had a female householder with no spouse or partner present. About 34.1% of all households were made up of individuals and 16.1% had someone living alone who was 65 years of age or older.

=== 2010 census ===
As of the 2010 census, there were 2,246 people, 1,048 households, and 639 families residing in the county. The population density was 2.19 inhabitants per square mile (0.8/km^{2}). There were 1,449 housing units at an average density of 1.41 per square mile (0.5/km^{2}). The racial makeup of the county was 96.75% White, 0.09% African American, 2.18% Native American, 0.04% Asian, 0.00% Pacific Islander, 0.27% from some other races and 0.67% from two or more races. Hispanic or Latino people of any race were 0.45% of the population.

In terms of ancestry, 46.5% were German, 41.5% were Norwegian, 10.4% were Irish, 7.4% were English, 5.5% were Swedish, and 3.2% were American.

There were 1,048 households, 22.2% had children under the age of 18 living with them, 51.5% were married couples living together, 6.0% had a female householder with no husband present, 39.0% were non-families, and 36.4% of all households were made up of individuals. The average household size was 2.10 and the average family size was 2.71. The median age was 50.3 years.

The median income for a household in the county was $43,684 and the median income for a family was $54,609. Males had a median income of $36,350 versus $26,164 for females. The per capita income for the county was $24,203. About 8.5% of families and 10.3% of the population were below the poverty line, including 17.1% of those under age 18 and 9.7% of those age 65 or over.

== Communities ==
=== Cities ===
- Bisbee
- Cando (county seat)
- Egeland
- Hansboro
- Perth
- Rocklake
- Sarles (mostly in Cavalier County)

=== Unincorporated communities ===
- Agate
- Armourdale
- Arndt
- Considine
- Crocus
- Elsberry
- Maza
- Newville
- Olmstead
- Pasha

=== Townships ===
- Armourdale
- Atkins
- Bethel
- Cando
- Coolin
- Crocus
- Dash
- Gerrard
- Grainfield
- Howell
- Lansing
- Maza
- Monroe
- Mount View
- New City
- Olson
- Paulson
- Picton
- Rock Lake
- Sidney
- Smith
- Sorenson
- Springfield
- Teddy
- Twin Hill
- Victor
- Virginia
- Zion

== Politics ==
United States presidential election results for Towner County, North Dakota
Year	Republican		Democratic		Third party(ies)	
Year	No.	%	No.	%	No.	%
1892	166	43.68%	0	0.00%	214	56.32%
1896	303	42.74%	394	55.57%	12	1.69%
1900	805	61.97%	454	34.95%	40	3.08%
1904	1,022	67.24%	435	28.62%	63	4.14%
1908	867	54.19%	655	40.94%	78	4.88%
1912	352	26.39%	532	39.88%	450	33.73%
1916	665	43.69%	769	50.53%	88	5.78%
1920	2,192	79.33%	476	17.23%	95	3.44%
1924	1,173	47.66%	223	9.06%	1,065	43.28%
1928	1,588	54.23%	1,324	45.22%	16	0.55%
1932	765	25.51%	2,190	73.02%	44	1.47%
1936	720	22.40%	1,744	54.26%	750	23.34%
1940	1,630	50.29%	1,596	49.24%	15	0.46%
1944	1,097	47.99%	1,185	51.84%	4	0.17%
1948	1,145	49.76%	1,100	47.81%	56	2.43%
1952	1,960	69.23%	843	29.78%	28	0.99%
1956	1,391	54.25%	1,169	45.59%	4	0.16%
1960	1,410	52.16%	1,292	47.80%	1	0.04%
1964	788	32.60%	1,628	67.36%	1	0.04%
1968	1,109	49.84%	990	44.49%	126	5.66%
1972	1,349	58.02%	944	40.60%	32	1.38%
1976	993	44.45%	1,216	54.43%	25	1.12%
1980	1,375	64.89%	568	26.81%	176	8.31%
1984	1,242	60.15%	789	38.21%	34	1.65%
1988	946	48.91%	970	50.16%	18	0.93%
1992	600	34.15%	748	42.57%	409	23.28%
1996	542	39.08%	649	46.79%	196	14.13%
2000	694	58.37%	410	34.48%	85	7.15%
2004	754	54.21%	606	43.57%	31	2.23%
2008	536	44.78%	621	51.88%	40	3.34%
2012	623	52.71%	516	43.65%	43	3.64%
2016	733	63.35%	305	26.36%	119	10.29%
2020	830	70.70%	317	27.00%	27	2.30%
2024	796	71.45%	289	25.94%	29	2.60%

== Education ==
School districts include:

- Leeds Public School District 6
- Mount Pleasant Public School District 4
- Munich Public School District 19
- North Star School District 10
- Starkweather Public School District 44

Former school districts:

- Bisbee-Egeland School District - Formed in 1980 with the merger of the Bisbee and Egeland districts, known as West Central School District 12 and East Central School District 12, respectively. Merged into North Star Schools in 2008.
- Cando School District - Merged into North Star Schools in 2008.
- North Central Public School District 28

== See also ==
- National Register of Historic Places listings in Towner County, North Dakota
