= Mazas =

Mazas is a surname. Notable people with the surname include:

- Jacques Féréol Mazas (1782–1849), French violinist
- Rafael Sánchez Mazas (1894–1966), Spanish writer and member of Franco's Falange movement

== See also ==
- Maza (disambiguation)
