= Doyon, North Dakota =

Unincorporated community in North Dakota, U.S.

Doyon
- Unincorporated community
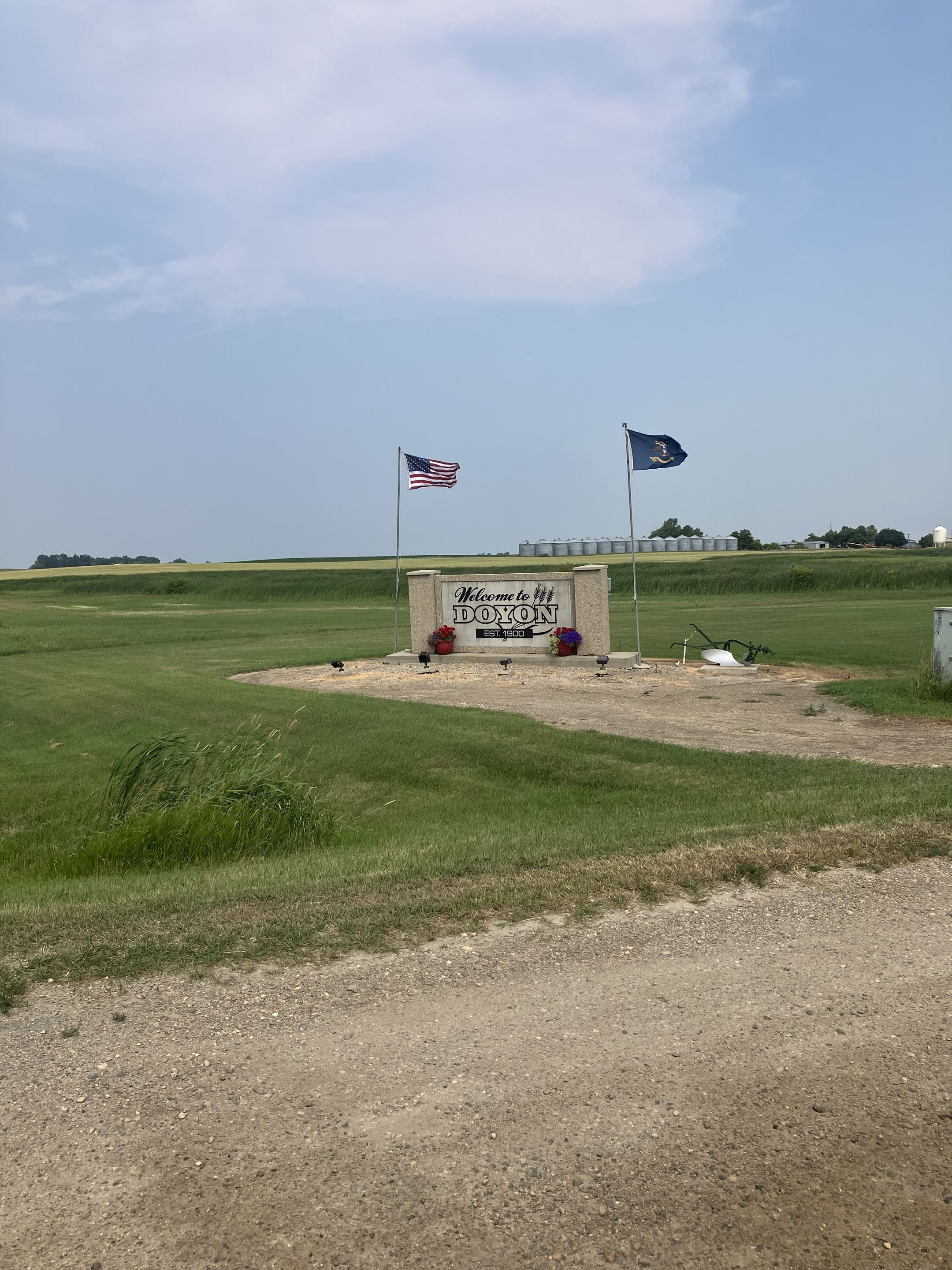

- Location within the state of North Dakota Doyon (the United States)
- Coordinates: 48°03′10″N 98°32′12″W
- Country: United States
- State: North Dakota
- County: Ramsey
- Elevation: 1,517 ft (462 m)
- Time zone: UTC-6 (Central (CST))
  - Summer (DST): UTC-5 (CDT)
- ZIP codes: 58362
- Area code: 701
- GNIS feature ID: 1028712

Doyon is an unincorporated community in Ramsey County, in the U.S. state of North Dakota.

== History ==
A post office was established at Doyon in 1900 and remained in operation until it was discontinued in 1993. The community was named for Charles H. Doyon, an early settler. The population was 120 in 1940.

== Transportation ==
Amtrak’s Empire Builder, which operates between Seattle/Portland and Chicago, passes through the town on BNSF tracks, but makes no stop. The nearest station is located in Devils Lake, 17 miles (27 km) to the west.
