= Bartlett, North Dakota =

Unincorporated community in North Dakota, US

Coordinates: 48°02′41″N 98°25′56″W

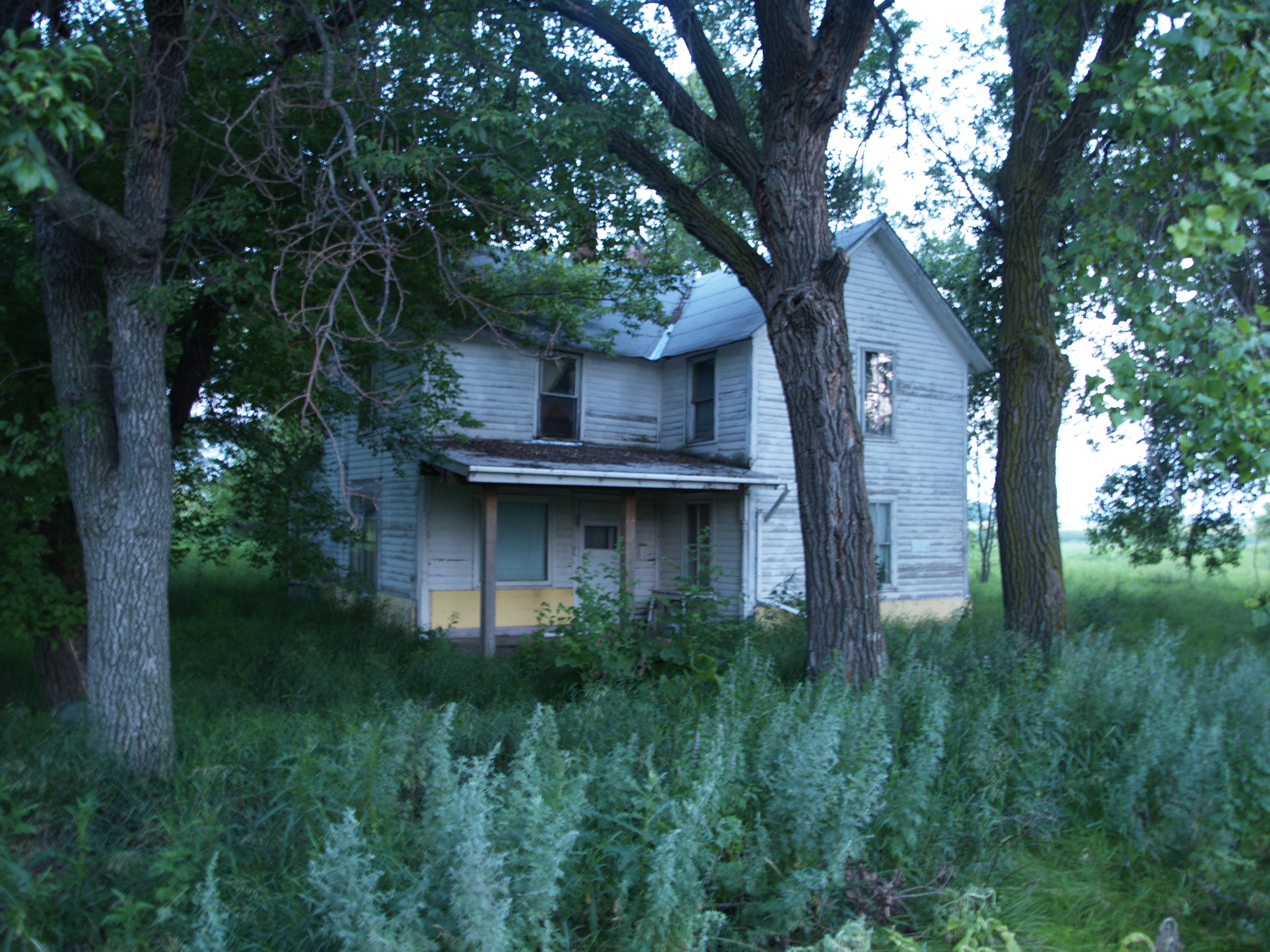
A house in Bartlett

Bartlett is an unincorporated community in Ramsey County, North Dakota, United States. In recent years, the town's population has dwindled.

A BNSF rail line runs through Bartlett.

== History ==
A post office called Bartlett was established in 1883, and remained in operation until being discontinued in 1975. The community was named for Frank Bartlett, the original owner of the town site.

Historical population
Census	Pop.	Note	%±
1910	120		—
1920	98		−18.3%
1930	67		−31.6%
1940	78		16.4%
1950	61		−21.8%
1960	39		−36.1%
1970	19		−51.3%
U.S. Decennial Census
