= Perth, North Dakota =

City in North Dakota, United States

- City
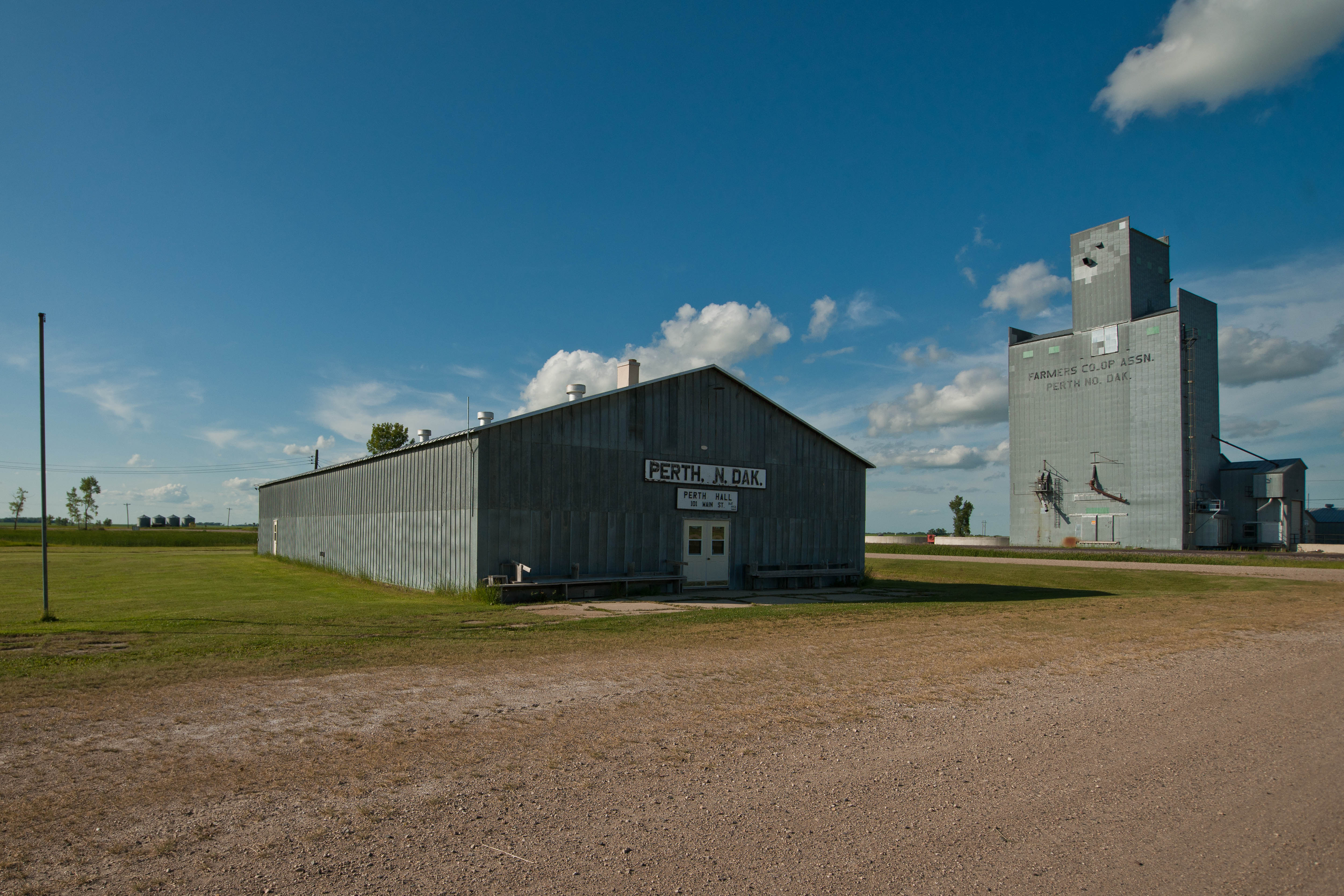
- Perth, North Dakota

- Location of Perth, North Dakota
- Coordinates: 48°42′53″N 99°27′29″W
- Country: United States
- State: North Dakota
- County: Towner
- Founded: 1897

Area
  - Total: 0.13 sq mi (0.33 km^{2})
  - Land: 0.13 sq mi (0.33 km^{2})
  - Water: 0 sq mi (0.00 km^{2})
- Elevation: 1,726 ft (526 m)

Population (2020)
  - Total: 6
  - Estimate (2024): 6
  - Density: 46.7/sq mi (18.03/km^{2})
- Time zone: UTC–6 (Central (CST))
  - Summer (DST): UTC–5 (CDT)
- ZIP Code: 58363
- Area code: 701
- FIPS code: 38-61780
- GNIS feature ID: 1036217

Perth is a city in Towner County, North Dakota, United States. The population was 6 at the 2020 census. Perth was founded in 1897.

Perth had a newspaper, the Perth Journal, from 1898 to 1904.

== Geography ==
According to the United States Census Bureau, the city has a total area of 0.13 square miles (0.34 km^{2}), all land.

== Demographics ==
Historical population
Census	Pop.	Note	%±
1910	221		—
1920	218		−1.4%
1930	153		−29.8%
1940	145		−5.2%
1950	124		−14.5%
1960	73		−41.1%
1970	44		−39.7%
1980	20		−54.5%
1990	22		10.0%
2000	13		−40.9%
2010	9		−30.8%
2020	6		−33.3%
2024 (est.)	6		0.0%
U.S. Decennial Census; 2020 Census

=== 2010 census ===
As of the 2010 census, there were 9 people, 5 households, and 2 families residing in the city. The population density was 69.2 inhabitants per square mile (26.7/km^{2}). There were 6 housing units at an average density of 46.2 per square mile (17.8/km^{2}). The racial makeup of the city was 100.0% White.

There were 5 households, of which 20.0% had children under the age of 18 living with them, 40.0% were married couples living together, and 60.0% were non-families. 60.0% of all households were made up of individuals, and 20% had someone living alone who was 65 years of age or older. The average household size was 1.80 and the average family size was 3.00.

The median age in the city was 52.5 years. 11.1% of residents were under the age of 18; 11.1% were between the ages of 18 and 24; 11.1% were from 25 to 44; 55.5% were from 45 to 64; and 11.1% were 65 years of age or older. The gender makeup of the city was 55.6% male and 44.4% female.

=== 2000 census ===
As of the 2000 census, there were 13 people, 4 households, and 2 families residing in the city. The population density was 98.6 inhabitants per square mile (38.1/km^{2}). There were 6 housing units at an average density of 45.5 per square mile (17.6/km^{2}). The racial makeup of the city was 100.00% White.

There were 4 households, out of which 2 had children under the age of 18 living with them, 2 were married couples living together, none had a female householder with no husband present, and 2 were non-families. Two of the households were made up of individuals, and 1 had someone living alone who was 65 years of age or older. The average household size was 3.25 and the average family size was 5.50.

In the city, the population was spread out, with 38.5% under the age of 18, 15.4% from 18 to 24, 15.4% from 25 to 44, 23.1% from 45 to 64, and 7.7% who were 65 years of age or older. The median age was 22 years. For every 100 females, there were 62.5 males. For every 100 females age 18 and over, there were 60.0 males.

The median income for a household in the city was $36,667, and the median income for a family was $51,250. Males had a median income of $31,250 versus $36,250 for females. The per capita income for the city was $11,381. None of the population or families were below the poverty line.
