= Maza, North Dakota =

Unincorporated community in North Dakota, United States

- Unincorporated community
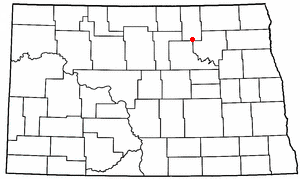
- Location of Maza, North Dakota
- Coordinates: 48°23′42″N 99°11′59″W
- Country: United States
- State: North Dakota
- County: Towner

Area
  - Total: 9.0 sq mi (23.4 km^{2})
  - Land: 8.2 sq mi (21.2 km^{2})
  - Water: 0.85 sq mi (2.2 km^{2})
- Elevation: 1,460 ft (450 m)

Population (2000)
  - Total: 5
  - Density: 0.52/sq mi (0.2/km^{2})
- Time zone: UTC-6 (Central (CST))
  - Summer (DST): UTC-5 (CDT)
- ZIP code: 58324
- Area code: 701
- FIPS code: 38-38980
- GNIS feature ID: 1036156

Maza is a former city in Towner County, North Dakota, United States. The population was 5 at the 2000 census. Maza was founded in 1893. Maza was incorporated as a city until 2002, when the city was dissolved and governance reverted to the surrounding Maza Township. Maza shares a zip code of 58324 with the city of Cando to the north.

== History ==
Maza got its start when the railroad was extended to that point. A post office was established at Maza in 1893, and remained in operation until 1964. The community most likely was named for its maize.

== Geography ==
According to the United States Census Bureau, in 2000 the city had a total area of 9.1 square miles (24 km^{2}), of which 8.2 square miles (21 km^{2}) was land and 0.9 square miles (2.3 km^{2}) was water.

== Demographics ==
Historical population
| Census | Pop. | Note | %± |
|---|---|---|---|
| 1930 | 70 | | — |
| 1940 | 66 | | −5.7% |
| 1950 | 82 | | 24.2% |
| 1960 | 31 | | −62.2% |
| 1970 | 20 | | −35.5% |
| 1980 | 21 | | 5.0% |
| 1990 | 12 | | −42.9% |
| 2000 | 5 | | −58.3% |
U.S. Decennial Census

As of the census of 2000, there were 5 people, 3 households, and 2 families residing in the city. The population density was 0.6 people per square mile (0.2/km^{2}). There were 5 housing units at an average density of 0.6/sq mi (0.2/km^{2}). The racial makeup of the city was 80.00% White, and 20.00% from two or more races.

There were three households, out of which two were married couples living together, and one was an individual. All five residents were aged between 45 and 64, and the median age was 52 years. There were two women and three men.

The median income for a household in the city was $38,750. The per capita income for the city was $39,000. No one was below the poverty line.
