= North Star Schools =

School district in North Dakota, USA

Address
- 418 2nd Avenue Cando, North Dakota, 58324; United States

District information
- Type: Public
- Grades: PreK–12
- NCES District ID: 3800390

Students and staff
- Students: 316
- Teachers: 25.66
- Staff: 29.0
- Student–teacher ratio: 12.31

Other information
- Website: www.northstar.k12.nd.us

North Star School District No. 10 is a school district headquartered in Cando, North Dakota. It operates North Star Public School.

Within Towner County it includes Cando, Bisbee, and Egeland. It also includes sections in Benson, Pierce, Ramsey, and Rolette counties.

== History ==
In 2008 the Bisbee-Egeland School District and the Cando School District were dissolved and merged into the current North Star School District. The Bisbee-Egeland School immediately closed with all students sent to Cando. In Cando, the vote succeeded with 351 approving and 10 disapproving. In October 2007 people in the Bisbee-Egeland district voted to consolidate with 189 for and 16 against.

When Wolford School District closed in 2019, North Star School was an option for those students. Upon disestablishment of the Wolford district, North Star was to take a portion of the district.
