= 1908 United States presidential election in North Dakota =

- November 3, 1908

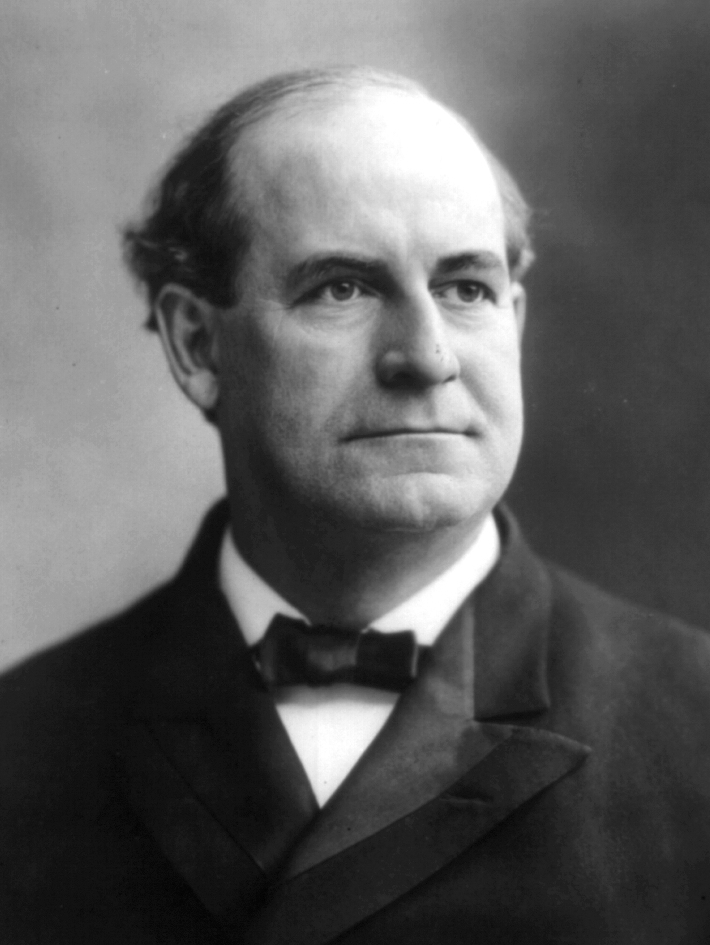
Nominee	William Howard Taft	William Jennings Bryan
Party	Republican	Democratic
Home state	Ohio	Nebraska
Running mate	James S. Sherman	John W. Kern
Electoral vote	4	0
Popular vote	57,680	32,885
Percentage	61.02%	34.79%
County results
Taft
40–50%
50–60%
60–70%
70–80%
80–90%
President before election
Theodore Roosevelt
Republican
Elected President
William Howard Taft
Republican

The 1908 United States presidential election in North Dakota took place on November 3, 1908. Voters chose four representatives, or electors to the Electoral College, who voted for president and vice president.

North Dakota voted for the Republican nominee, Secretary of War William Howard Taft of Ohio and his running mate James S. Sherman of New York. They defeated the Democratic nominees, former U.S. Representative of Nebraska William Jennings Bryan and his running mate John W. Kern of Indiana. Taft won the state by a margin of 26.23%.

With 61.02% of the popular vote, North Dakota would be Taft's fourth strongest victory in terms of percentage in the popular vote after Vermont, Maine and Michigan.

Bryan had previously lost North Dakota to Republican William McKinley in both 1896 and 1900.

== Results ==
1908 United States presidential election in North Dakota
Party	Candidate	Running mate	Popular vote		Electoral vote	
Party	Candidate	Running mate	Count	%	Count	%
Republican	William Howard Taft of Ohio	James Schoolcraft Sherman of New York	57,680	61.02%	4	100.00%
Democratic	William Jennings Bryan of Nebraska	John Worth Kern of Indiana	32,885	34.79%	0	0.00%
Socialist	Eugene Victor Debs of Indiana	Benjamin Hanford of New York	2,421	2.56%	0	0.00%
Prohibition	Eugene Wilder Chafin of Illinois	Aaron Sherman Watkins of Ohio	1,496	1.58%	0	0.00%
Independence	Thomas Louis Hisgen of Massachusetts	John Temple Graves of Georgia	43	0.05%	0	0.00%
Total			94,525	100.00%	4	100.00%

=== Results by county ===
County	William Howard Taft Republican		William Jennings Bryan Democratic		Eugene V. Debs Socialist		Eugene W. Chafin Prohibition		Thomas L. Hisgen Independence		Margin		Total votes cast
County	#	%	#	%	#	%	#	%	#	%	#	%	Total votes cast
Adams	577	70.45%	201	24.54%	21	2.56%	19	2.32%	1	0.12%	376	45.91%	819
Barnes	1,786	62.06%	996	34.61%	35	1.22%	60	2.08%	1	0.03%	790	27.45%	2,878
Benson	1,363	67.81%	553	27.51%	30	1.49%	64	3.18%	0	0.00%	810	40.30%	2,010
Billings	768	73.70%	236	22.65%	21	2.02%	17	1.63%	0	0.00%	532	51.06%	1,042
Bottineau	1,951	59.45%	1,146	34.92%	140	4.27%	44	1.34%	1	0.03%	805	24.53%	3,282
Bowman	451	66.13%	209	30.65%	15	2.20%	7	1.03%	0	0.00%	242	35.48%	682
Burleigh	1,375	65.82%	660	31.59%	37	1.77%	17	0.81%	0	0.00%	715	34.23%	2,089
Cass	3,681	62.53%	2,000	33.97%	94	1.60%	106	1.80%	6	0.10%	1,681	28.55%	5,887
Cavalier	1,528	55.06%	1,190	42.88%	32	1.15%	24	0.86%	1	0.04%	338	12.18%	2,775
Dickey	1,062	60.96%	633	36.34%	30	1.72%	17	0.98%	0	0.00%	429	24.63%	1,742
Dunn	373	68.82%	160	29.52%	8	1.48%	1	0.18%	0	0.00%	213	39.30%	542
Eddy	540	58.00%	368	39.53%	6	0.64%	16	1.72%	1	0.11%	172	18.47%	931
Emmons	951	59.70%	618	38.79%	14	0.88%	10	0.63%	0	0.00%	333	20.90%	1,593
Foster	569	56.00%	434	42.72%	6	0.59%	7	0.69%	0	0.00%	135	13.29%	1,016
Grand Forks	2,740	57.41%	1,750	36.66%	153	3.21%	130	2.72%	0	0.00%	990	20.74%	4,773
Griggs	605	51.84%	493	42.25%	18	1.54%	51	4.37%	0	0.00%	112	9.60%	1,167
Hettinger	568	73.96%	181	23.57%	9	1.17%	10	1.30%	0	0.00%	387	50.39%	768
Kidder	769	72.55%	242	22.83%	26	2.45%	23	2.17%	0	0.00%	527	49.72%	1,060
LaMoure	1,104	64.75%	553	32.43%	19	1.11%	28	1.64%	1	0.06%	551	32.32%	1,705
Logan	711	81.44%	143	16.38%	16	1.83%	3	0.34%	0	0.00%	568	65.06%	873
McHenry	1,772	56.16%	1,296	41.08%	55	1.74%	32	1.01%	0	0.00%	476	15.09%	3,155
McIntosh	927	86.47%	140	13.06%	4	0.37%	1	0.09%	0	0.00%	787	73.41%	1,072
McKenzie	574	68.41%	212	25.27%	46	5.48%	7	0.83%	0	0.00%	362	43.15%	839
McLean	2,273	67.83%	927	27.66%	98	2.92%	51	1.52%	2	0.06%	1,346	40.17%	3,351
Mercer	430	81.13%	96	18.11%	2	0.38%	2	0.38%	0	0.00%	334	63.02%	530
Morton	2,021	67.91%	873	29.33%	67	2.25%	14	0.47%	1	0.03%	1,148	38.58%	2,976
Nelson	1,225	63.80%	616	32.08%	60	3.13%	17	0.89%	2	0.10%	609	31.72%	1,920
Oliver	325	62.50%	179	34.42%	3	0.58%	13	2.50%	0	0.00%	146	28.08%	520
Pembina	1,389	52.55%	1,185	44.84%	17	0.64%	50	1.89%	2	0.08%	204	7.72%	2,643
Pierce	884	57.37%	610	39.58%	28	1.82%	18	1.17%	1	0.06%	274	17.78%	1,541
Ramsey	1,480	55.79%	1,072	40.41%	72	2.71%	27	1.02%	2	0.08%	408	15.38%	2,653
Ransom	1,308	67.53%	581	29.99%	11	0.57%	36	1.86%	1	0.05%	727	37.53%	1,937
Richland	1,864	54.17%	1,502	43.65%	14	0.41%	60	1.74%	1	0.03%	362	10.52%	3,441
Rolette	811	55.32%	529	36.08%	99	6.75%	24	1.64%	3	0.20%	282	19.24%	1,466
Sargent	1,012	61.48%	576	34.99%	38	2.31%	20	1.22%	0	0.00%	436	26.49%	1,646
Stark	922	63.76%	496	34.30%	19	1.31%	7	0.48%	2	0.14%	426	29.46%	1,446
Steele	881	68.72%	366	28.55%	17	1.33%	18	1.40%	0	0.00%	515	40.17%	1,282
Stutsman	1,777	55.67%	1,344	42.11%	24	0.75%	45	1.41%	2	0.06%	433	13.57%	3,192
Towner	867	54.19%	655	40.94%	59	3.69%	18	1.13%	1	0.06%	212	13.25%	1,600
Traill	1,207	66.03%	490	26.81%	33	1.81%	97	5.31%	1	0.05%	717	39.22%	1,828
Walsh	1,751	49.46%	1,641	46.36%	117	3.31%	30	0.85%	1	0.03%	110	3.11%	3,540
Ward	5,286	57.39%	3,163	34.34%	563	6.11%	193	2.10%	5	0.05%	2,123	23.05%	9,210
Wells	1,243	68.07%	535	29.30%	22	1.20%	25	1.37%	1	0.05%	708	38.77%	1,826
Williams	1,979	60.41%	1,034	31.56%	223	6.81%	37	1.13%	3	0.09%	945	28.85%	3,276
Totals	57,680	61.02%	32,884	34.79%	2,421	2.56%	1,496	1.58%	43	0.05%	24,796	26.23%	94,524

== See also ==
- United States presidential elections in North Dakota
