= 1900 United States presidential election in North Dakota =

- November 6, 1900
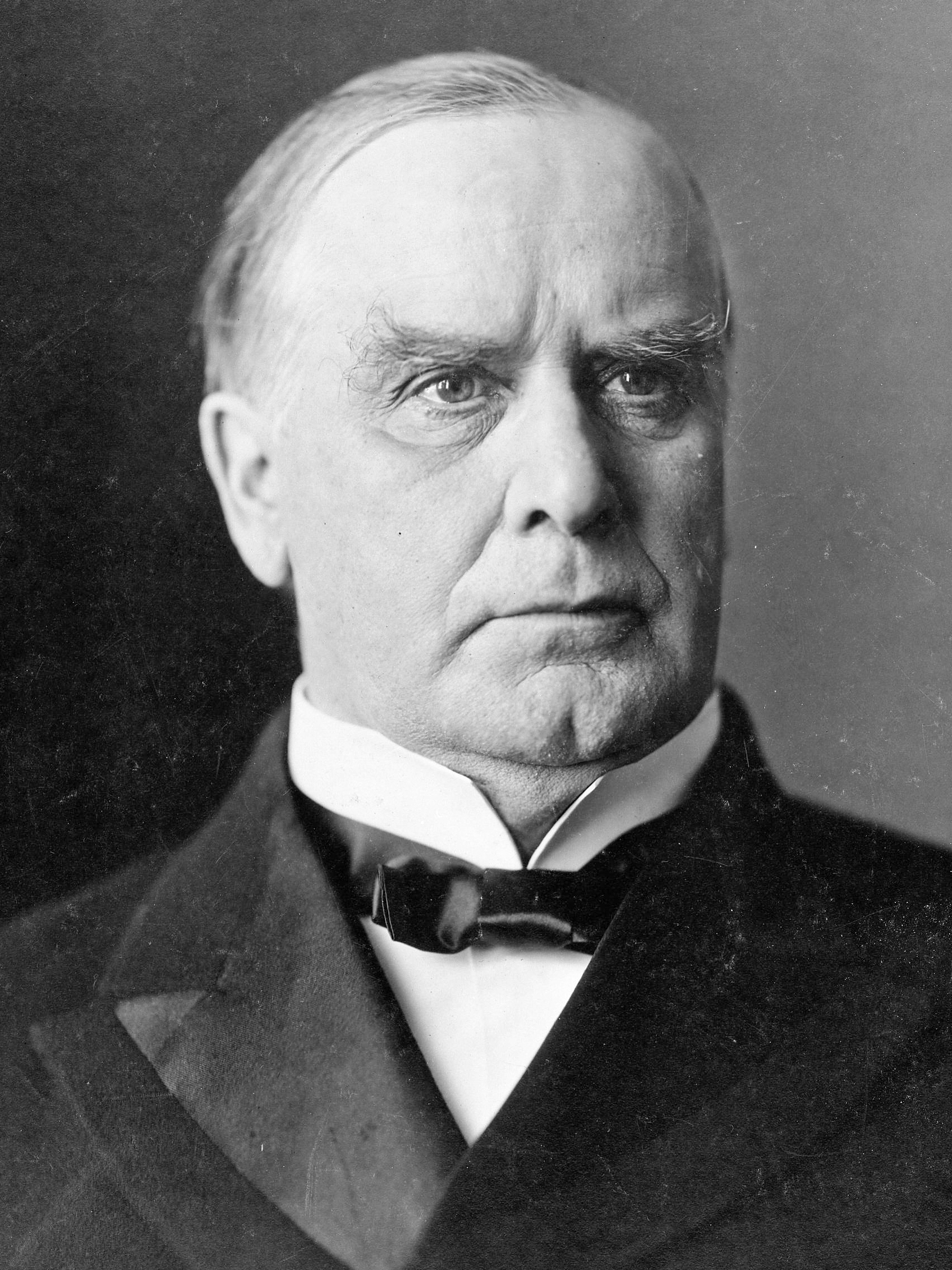

Nominee	William McKinley	William Jennings Bryan
Party	Republican	Democratic
Home state	Ohio	Nebraska
Running mate	Theodore Roosevelt	Adlai Stevenson I
Electoral vote	3	0
Popular vote	35,898	20,531
Percentage	62.12%	35.53%
County results
McKinley
40–50%
50–60%
60–70%
70–80%
80–90%
President before election
William McKinley
Republican
Elected President
William McKinley
Republican

The 1900 United States presidential election in North Dakota took place on November 6, 1900. All contemporary 45 states were part of the 1900 United States presidential election. Voters chose three electors to the Electoral College, which selected the president and vice president.

North Dakota was won by the Republican nominees, incumbent President William McKinley of Ohio and his running mate Theodore Roosevelt of New York. They defeated the Democratic nominees, former U.S. Representative and 1896 Democratic presidential nominee William Jennings Bryan and his running mate, former Vice President Adlai Stevenson I. McKinley won the state by a margin of 26.59% in this rematch of the 1896 presidential election. The return of economic prosperity and recent victory in the Spanish–American War helped McKinley to score a decisive victory.

With 62.12% of the popular vote, North Dakota would be McKinley's second strongest victory in terms of percentage in the popular vote after Vermont. McKinley had previously won the state four years earlier, but more than doubled his margin from 1896. Bryan would later lose North Dakota again to William Howard Taft in 1908.

== Results ==
1900 United States presidential election in North Dakota
Party	Candidate	Votes	Percentage	Electoral votes
Republican	William McKinley (incumbent)	35,898	62.12%	3
Democratic	William Jennings Bryan	20,531	35.53%	0
Prohibition	John G. Woolley	731	1.26%	0
Social Democratic	Eugene V. Debs	520	0.90%	0
Populist	Wharton Barker	111	0.19%	0
Totals		57,791	100.00%	3
Voter turnout				—

=== Results by county ===
County	William McKinley Republican		William Jennings Bryan Democratic		John G. Woolley Prohibition		Eugene V. Debs Socialist		Wharton Barker Populist		Margin		Total votes cast
County	#	%	#	%	#	%	#	%	#	%	#	%	Total votes cast
Barnes	1,324	53.78%	1,077	43.74%	32	1.30%	22	0.89%	7	0.28%	247	10.03%	2,462
Benson	1,084	75.49%	319	22.21%	18	1.25%	12	0.84%	3	0.21%	765	53.27%	1,436
Billings	158	74.18%	51	23.94%	1	0.47%	3	1.41%	0	0.00%	107	50.23%	213
Bottineau	728	52.30%	628	45.11%	12	0.86%	17	1.22%	7	0.50%	100	7.18%	1,392
Burleigh	679	66.44%	339	33.17%	1	0.10%	2	0.20%	1	0.10%	340	33.27%	1,022
Cass	3,485	65.68%	1,636	30.83%	103	1.94%	78	1.47%	4	0.08%	1,849	34.85%	5,306
Cavalier	1,361	51.34%	1,211	45.68%	32	1.21%	44	1.66%	3	0.11%	150	5.66%	2,651
Dickey	763	56.19%	567	41.75%	14	1.03%	8	0.59%	6	0.44%	196	14.43%	1,358
Eddy	455	64.45%	235	33.29%	8	1.13%	7	0.99%	1	0.14%	220	31.16%	706
Emmons	433	57.97%	311	41.63%	1	0.13%	2	0.27%	0	0.00%	122	16.33%	747
Foster	415	61.48%	241	35.70%	16	2.37%	1	0.15%	2	0.30%	174	25.78%	675
Grand Forks	2,603	61.33%	1,532	36.10%	58	1.37%	41	0.97%	10	0.24%	1,071	25.24%	4,244
Griggs	527	54.44%	407	42.05%	29	3.00%	2	0.21%	3	0.31%	120	12.40%	968
Kidder	225	74.01%	70	23.03%	9	2.96%	0	0.00%	0	0.00%	155	50.99%	304
LaMoure	597	58.41%	405	39.63%	10	0.98%	9	0.88%	1	0.10%	192	18.79%	1,022
Logan	231	86.52%	35	13.11%	1	0.37%	0	0.00%	0	0.00%	196	73.41%	267
McHenry	595	70.00%	222	26.12%	8	0.94%	23	2.71%	2	0.24%	373	43.88%	850
McIntosh	658	84.04%	125	15.96%	0	0.00%	0	0.00%	0	0.00%	533	68.07%	783
McLean	587	83.74%	110	15.69%	3	0.43%	1	0.14%	0	0.00%	477	68.05%	701
Mercer	269	86.77%	41	13.23%	0	0.00%	0	0.00%	0	0.00%	228	73.55%	310
Morton	1,056	66.04%	536	33.52%	3	0.19%	4	0.25%	0	0.00%	520	32.52%	1,599
Nelson	994	61.24%	576	35.49%	24	1.48%	25	1.54%	4	0.25%	418	25.75%	1,623
Oliver	110	58.82%	75	40.11%	2	1.07%	0	0.00%	0	0.00%	35	18.72%	187
Pembina	1,732	55.34%	1,321	42.20%	59	1.88%	17	0.54%	1	0.03%	411	13.13%	3,130
Pierce	535	64.93%	276	33.50%	5	0.61%	6	0.73%	2	0.24%	259	31.43%	824
Ramsey	1,147	67.79%	496	29.31%	15	0.89%	29	1.71%	5	0.30%	651	38.48%	1,692
Ransom	924	62.77%	499	33.90%	30	2.04%	10	0.68%	9	0.61%	425	28.87%	1,472
Richland	2,067	58.46%	1,399	39.56%	37	1.05%	33	0.93%	0	0.00%	668	18.89%	3,536
Rolette	566	60.41%	355	37.89%	8	0.85%	6	0.64%	2	0.21%	211	22.52%	937
Sargent	765	56.25%	564	41.47%	21	1.54%	9	0.66%	1	0.07%	201	14.78%	1,360
Stark	780	64.20%	426	35.06%	4	0.33%	4	0.33%	1	0.08%	354	29.14%	1,215
Steele	724	74.41%	214	21.99%	18	1.85%	2	0.21%	15	1.54%	510	52.42%	973
Stutsman	1,077	59.11%	711	39.02%	30	1.65%	4	0.22%	0	0.00%	366	20.09%	1,822
Towner	805	61.97%	454	34.95%	14	1.08%	26	2.00%	0	0.00%	351	27.02%	1,299
Traill	1,537	76.13%	409	20.26%	56	2.77%	16	0.79%	1	0.05%	1,128	55.87%	2,019
Walsh	1,807	49.41%	1,804	49.33%	29	0.79%	16	0.44%	1	0.03%	3	0.08%	3,657
Ward	880	68.06%	364	28.15%	14	1.08%	25	1.93%	10	0.77%	516	39.91%	1,293
Wells	966	69.90%	388	28.08%	8	0.58%	13	0.94%	7	0.51%	578	41.82%	1,382
Williams	249	71.97%	95	27.46%	2	0.58%	0	0.00%	0	0.00%	154	44.51%	346
Totals	35,898	62.13%	20,524	35.52%	735	1.27%	517	0.89%	109	0.19%	15,374	26.61%	57,783

== See also ==
- United States presidential elections in North Dakota
