= 1892 United States presidential election in North Dakota =

- November 8, 1892

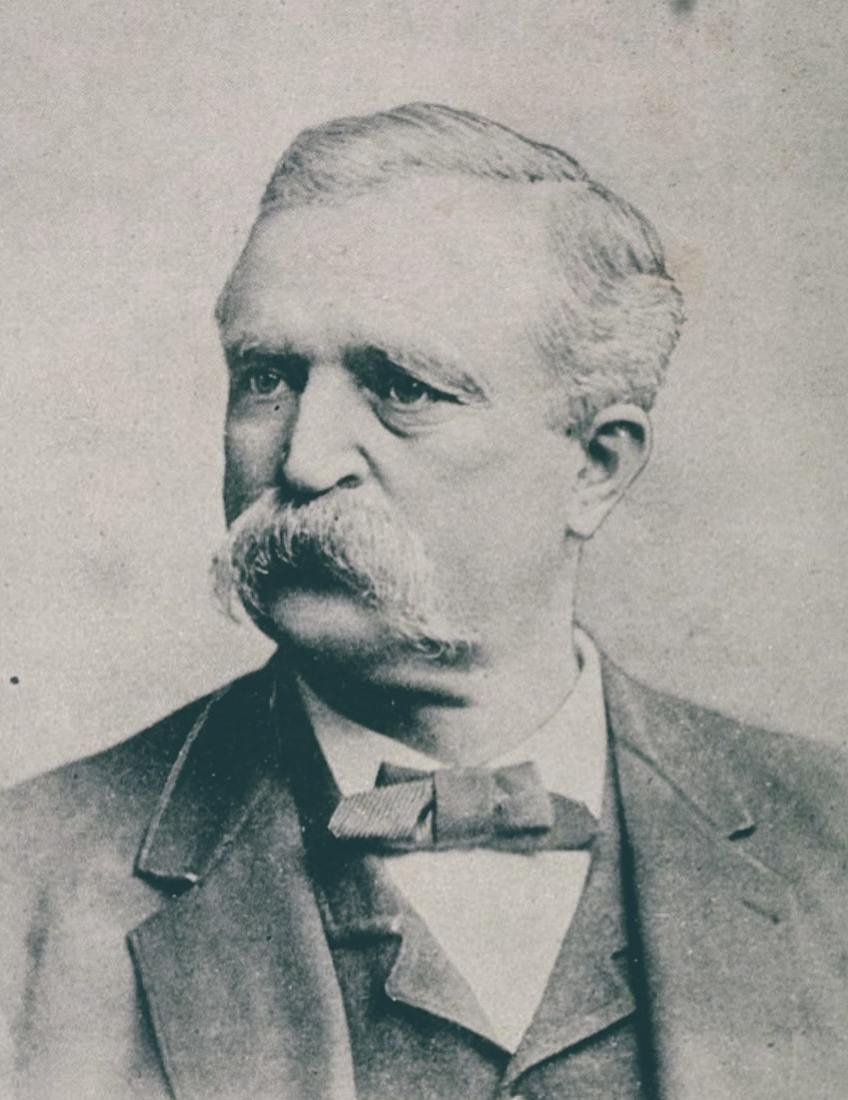

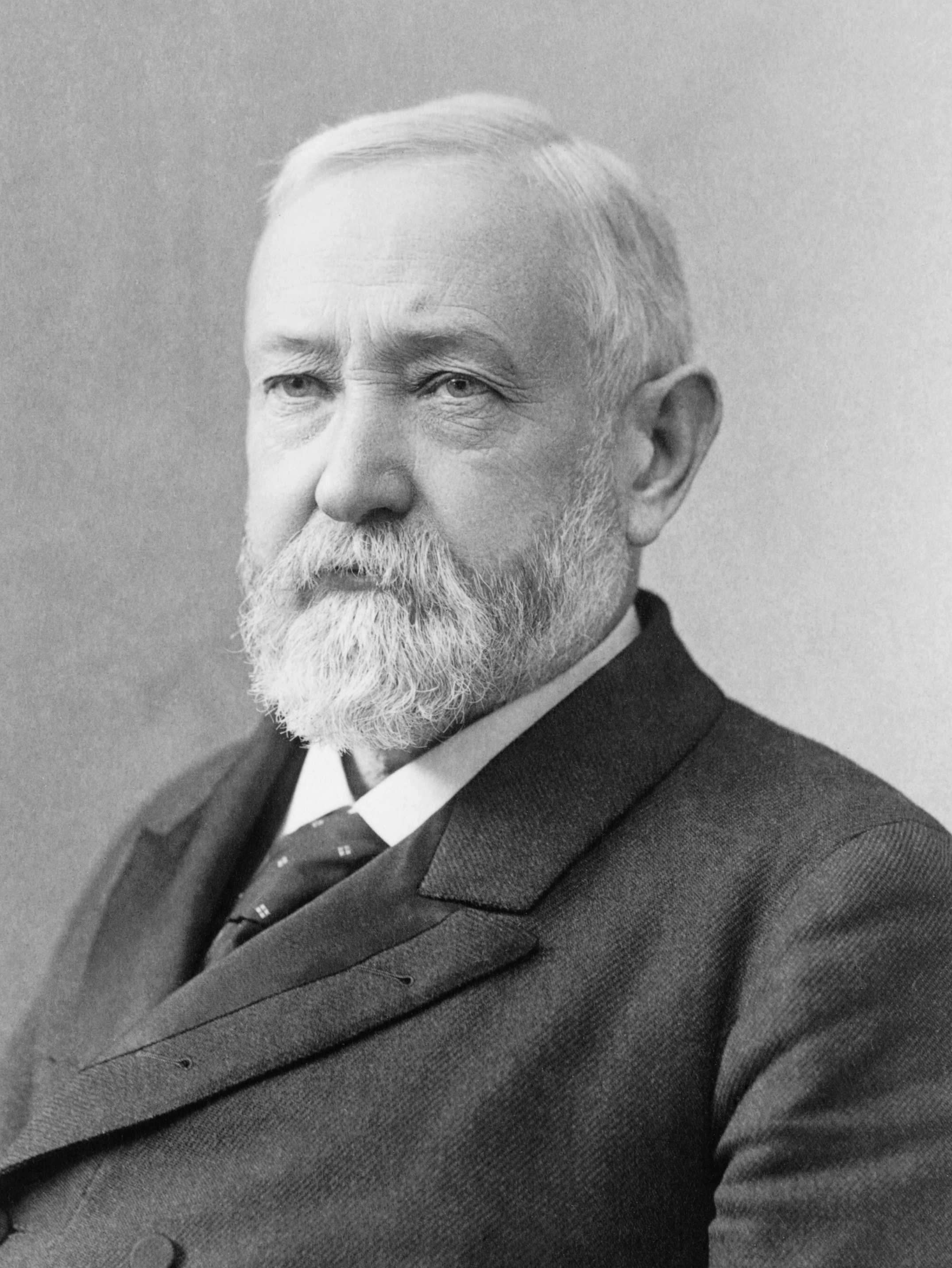
Nominee	Grover Cleveland	James B. Weaver	Benjamin Harrison
Party	Democratic	Populist	Republican
Alliance	Fusion	Fusion
Home state	New York	Iowa	Indiana
Running mate	Adlai Stevenson I	James G. Field	Whitelaw Reid
Electoral vote	1	1	1
Popular vote	17,700	17,520	17,519
Percentage	49.01%	48.51%	48.50%
County results
Fusion
50–60%
60–70%
70–80%
Harrison
40–50%
50–60%
60–70%
70–80%
Unorganized
President before election
Benjamin Harrison
Republican
Elected President
Grover Cleveland
Democratic

The 1892 United States presidential election in North Dakota took place on November 8, 1892. As North Dakota had been admitted to the Union as the 39th state on November 2, 1889, this was the first presidential election in which North Dakota cast electoral votes. All contemporary 44 states were part of the 1892 United States presidential election. Voters chose three electors to the Electoral College, which selected the president and vice president.

In 1892, the North Dakota Democratic Party and People's Party conducted a fusion ticket. In North Dakota, the Fusionists' opponents were the Republican nominees, incumbent President Benjamin Harrison of Indiana and his running mate Whitelaw Reid of New York.

As was the case in this era, voters in North Dakota chose electors individually rather than as a slate. While it was a Fusion elector who earned the most votes with 17,700, the 17,519 recorded by the top Republican elector was enough to edge out the lowest vote-getting Fusion elector for third place overall. This created a split delegation of electors. Ultimately, the Fusion electors split their votes (one for Weaver and one for Democratic president-elect Grover Cleveland) while the Republican elector duly voted for the defeated incumbent Harrison. This is the only US presidential election in which a state has equally distributed its electoral votes between three candidates. A state had only cast electoral votes for three different candidates twice before, in 1824 (New York cast votes for four) and 1872, the latter due to the death of Horace Greeley. Since 1892, the only time a state has cast electoral votes for more than two candidates was in 2016, when both Washington and Texas did so. However, both of those situations involved faithless electors, meaning this remains (as of 2026) the last time a state's voters duly elected presidential electors who vote more or less as pledged for three different candidates.

== Results ==
General election results
Party	Pledged to	Elector	Votes
Democratic Party & People's Party	Fusion (Note: Voted for Grover Cleveland for president)	Arnvind P. Rondestvedt	17,700
Democratic Party & People's Party	Fusion (Note: Voted for James B. Weaver for president)	Milton D. Williams	17,520
Republican Party	Benjamin Harrison	J. J. Wamberg	17,519
Democratic Party & People's Party	Fusion	William Burnett	17,511
Republican Party	Benjamin Harrison	J. R. Clark	17,506
Republican Party	Benjamin Harrison	E. L. Yeager	17,463
Prohibition Party	John Bidwell	G. Sumner Baskerville	899
Prohibition Party	John Bidwell	G. J. Omland	885
Prohibition Party	John Bidwell	Amos M. Barnum	855
Total votes (Note: Based on totals for highest elector on each ticket)			36,118

=== Results by county ===
County	Benjamin Harrison Republican		Fusion Democratic and People's		John Bidwell Prohibition		Margin		Total votes cast
County	#	%	#	%	#	%	#	%	Total votes cast
Barnes	665	41.02%	918	56.63%	38	2.34%	-253	-15.61%	1,621
Benson	419	68.80%	175	28.74%	15	2.46%	244	40.07%	609
Billings	47	73.44%	17	26.56%	0	0.00%	30	46.88%	64
Bottineau	175	37.15%	290	61.57%	6	1.27%	-115	-24.42%	471
Burleigh	640	68.60%	283	30.33%	10	1.07%	357	38.26%	933
Cass	2,022	53.98%	1,647	43.97%	77	2.06%	375	10.01%	3,746
Cavalier	297	25.34%	855	72.95%	20	1.71%	-558	-47.61%	1,172
Dickey	509	43.39%	647	55.16%	17	1.45%	-138	-11.76%	1,173
Eddy	202	51.40%	184	46.82%	7	1.78%	18	4.58%	393
Emmons	278	67.48%	132	32.04%	2	0.49%	146	35.44%	412
Foster	192	54.08%	157	44.23%	6	1.69%	35	9.86%	355
Grand Forks	1,639	51.27%	1,483	46.39%	75	2.35%	156	4.88%	3,197
Griggs	245	41.88%	332	56.75%	8	1.37%	-87	-14.87%	585
Kidder	224	60.87%	136	36.96%	8	2.17%	88	23.91%	368
LaMoure	338	42.62%	436	54.98%	19	2.40%	-98	-12.36%	793
Logan	87	70.73%	35	28.46%	1	0.81%	52	42.28%	123
McHenry	201	64.22%	110	35.14%	2	0.64%	91	29.07%	313
McIntosh	280	70.00%	120	30.00%	0	0.00%	160	40.00%	400
McLean	115	62.84%	65	35.52%	3	1.64%	50	27.32%	183
Mercer	28	32.94%	48	56.47%	9	10.59%	-20	-23.53%	85
Morton	596	60.75%	380	38.74%	5	0.51%	216	22.02%	981
Nelson	460	46.09%	527	52.81%	11	1.10%	-67	-6.71%	998
Oliver	35	42.17%	48	57.83%	0	0.00%	-13	-15.66%	83
Pembina	954	36.72%	1,511	58.16%	133	5.12%	-557	-21.44%	2,598
Pierce	121	69.14%	53	30.29%	1	0.57%	68	38.86%	175
Ramsey	619	57.58%	421	39.16%	35	3.26%	198	18.42%	1,075
Ransom	566	49.43%	526	45.94%	53	4.63%	40	3.49%	1,145
Richland	866	42.77%	1,134	56.00%	25	1.23%	-268	-13.23%	2,025
Rolette	273	57.84%	194	41.10%	5	1.06%	79	16.74%	472
Sargent	491	47.39%	525	50.68%	20	1.93%	-34	-3.28%	1,036
Stark	339	60.64%	212	37.92%	8	1.43%	127	22.72%	559
Steele	398	52.65%	338	44.71%	20	2.65%	60	7.94%	756
Stutsman	648	53.91%	522	43.43%	32	2.66%	126	10.48%	1,202
Towner	166	43.68%	214	56.32%	0	0.00%	-48	-12.63%	380
Traill	1,026	56.31%	668	36.66%	128	7.03%	358	19.65%	1,822
Walsh	974	31.48%	2,040	65.93%	80	2.59%	-1,066	-34.45%	3,094
Ward	182	58.52%	114	36.66%	15	4.82%	68	21.86%	311
Wells	157	50.81%	147	47.57%	5	1.62%	10	3.24%	309
Williams	45	44.55%	56	55.45%	0	0.00%	-11	-10.89%	101
Totals	17,519	48.50%	17,700	49.01%	899	2.49%	-181	-0.50%	36,118

== See also ==
- United States presidential elections in North Dakota
