= Jonathan Maza =

Argentine professional footballer

Personal information
- Full name: Jonathan Sebastián Maza
- Date of birth: 1 October 1998 (age 28)
- Place of birth: Buenos Aires, Argentina
- Height: 1.74 m (5 ft 9 in)
- Position: Midfielder

Team information
- Current team: Deportivo Español

Senior career*
Years	Team	Apps	(Gls)
2018–	Deportivo Español	55	(2)
- * Club domestic league appearances and goals as of 18:04, 16 September 2020 (UTC)

Jonathan Sebastián Maza (born 1 October 1998) is an Argentine professional footballer who plays as a midfielder for Club Atlético Ituzaingó.

== Career ==
Maza began his career with Deportivo Español. He appeared for his professional debut on 26 February 2018 versus San Miguel, coming off the pitch for Emanuel Escuredo after fifty-three minutes. Twenty-six further appearances followed in Primera B Metropolitana, which culminated with the midfielder netting his first senior goal in a win away to Sacachispas in April 2019; in 2018–19, as they suffered relegation to tier four.

== Personal life ==
In July 2020, it was confirmed that Maza had tested positive for COVID-19 amid the pandemic.

== Career statistics ==
As of 16 September 2020.

Appearances and goals by club, season and competition
Club	Season	League			Cup		League Cup		Continental		Other		Total	
Club	Season	Division	Apps	Goals	Apps	Goals	Apps	Goals	Apps	Goals	Apps	Goals	Apps	Goals
Deportivo Español	2017–18	Primera B Metropolitana	9	0	0	0	—		—		0	0	9	0
Deportivo Español	2018–19	Primera B Metropolitana	23	1	0	0	—		—		0	0	23	1
Deportivo Español	2019–20	Primera C Metropolitana	23	1	0	0	—		—		0	0	23	1
Career total			55	2	0	0	—		—		0	0	55	2
