= Churchs Ferry, North Dakota =

- CDP & Unincorporated community
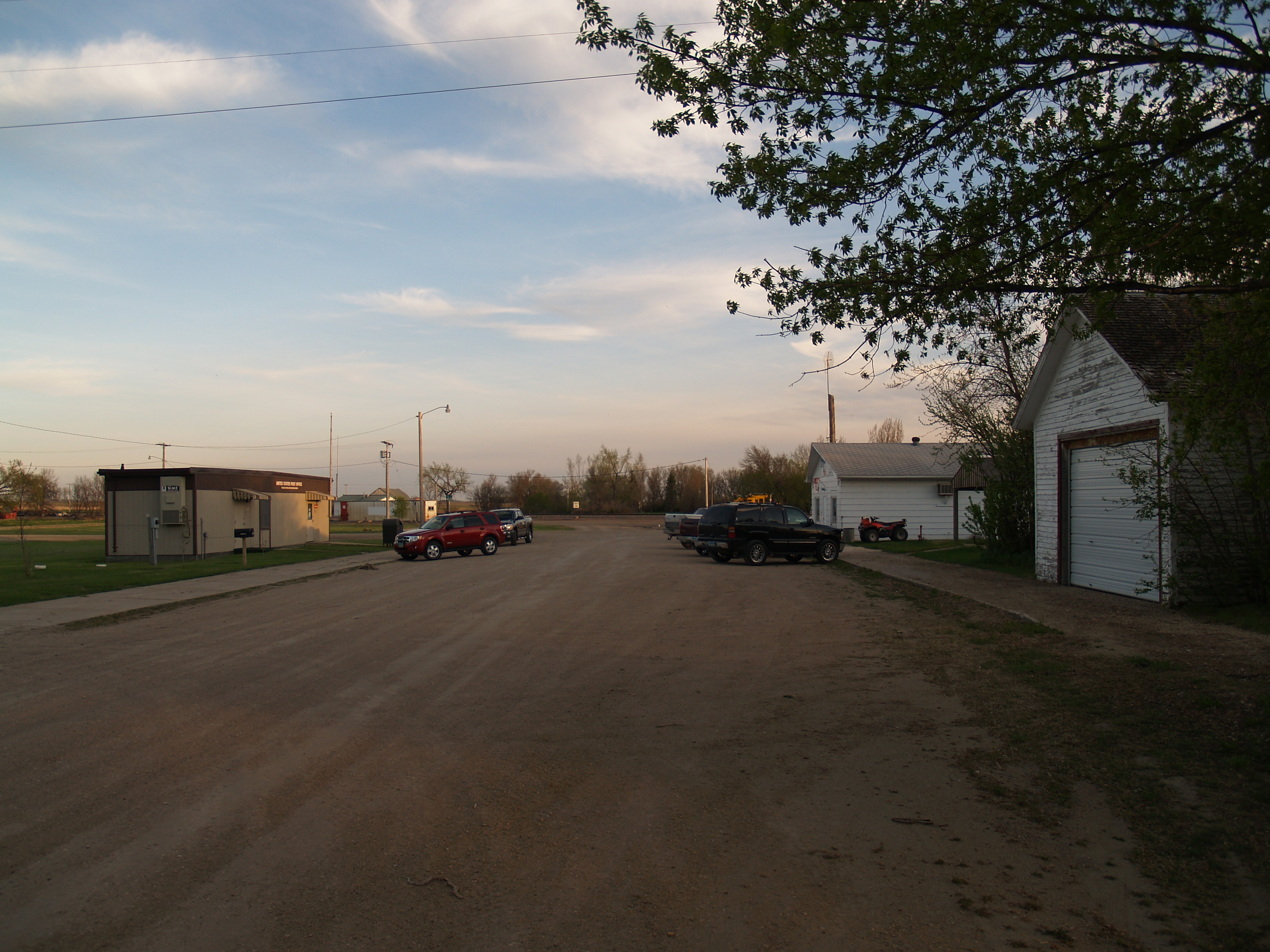
- Street in Churchs Ferry (May 2008)
- Interactive map of Churchs Ferry, North Dakota
- Location within North Dakota
- Coordinates: 48.2686°N 99.1944°W
- Country: United States
- State: North Dakota
- County: Ramsey
- Founded as Ferry: 1883
- Founded as Churchs Ferry: November 1886
- Incorporated (village): March 5, 1897
- Incorporated (city): July 1, 1967
- Unincorporated (dissolved): September 30, 2022
- Named after: Irvine A. Church

Area
  - Total: 0.432 sq mi (1.119 km^{2})
  - Land: 0.432 sq mi (1.119 km^{2})
  - Water: 0 sq mi (0.000 km^{2}) 0.00%
- Elevation: 1,450 ft (442 m)

Population (2020)
  - Total: 9
  - Estimate (2025): 6
  - Density: 21/sq mi (8.0/km^{2})
- Time zone: UTC–6 (Central (CST))
  - Summer (DST): UTC–5 (CDT)
- ZIP Code: 58325
- Area code: 701
- FIPS code: 38-14140
- GNIS feature ID: 2831213
- Highway: US 2

Churchs Ferry is a census-designated place (CDP) and unincorporated community in Ramsey County, North Dakota, United States. The population was 9 as of the 2020 census, and was estimated at 6 in 2025. That has been impacted by the expansion of nearby Devils Lake.

== History ==
The City of Churchs Ferry was founded in 1883 until September 30, 2022 when the town disincorporated and was turned over to Ramsey County. Churchs Ferry was incorporated as a village on March 5, 1897 and as a city on July 1, 1967.

The town took its name from an early resident, Irvine Church, who operated a ferry service on Devils Lake, when the Minnie H steamboat also traversed its waters. The lake began shrinking after 1900, and soon became too shallow for commercial vessels. The prolonged drought of the Dust Bowl years impacted the lake, reducing it to a slough by 1940. The lake began to recover in the mid-20th century, returning to a depth that allowed the resumption of recreational use by the 1970s.

Devils Lake began rising again in the early 1990s, and more than 400 homes around the lake have been relocated or destroyed. This includes much of the community of Churchs Ferry, one of two municipalities that have been bought out by government agencies. The other is Penn, although some people remain in both communities. Measures have since been implemented to alleviate ongoing damage caused by the increase in elevation, and the lake sits several feet below its outlet neat Tolna.

On January 10, 2012, Churchs Ferry residents voted 5 to 2 to remain an incorporated town.

On June 14, 2022, the town's 6 remaining residents voted to dissolve the city with a 5–1 vote. The city dissolved on September 1, 2022, with Paul Christenson being the last mayor of Churchs Ferry.

== Geography ==
According to the United States Census Bureau, the CDP has a total area of 0.432 square miles (1.12 km^{2}), all land.

== Demographics ==
Historical population
Census	Pop.	Note	%±
1900	264		—
1910	457		73.1%
1920	353		−22.8%
1930	295		−16.4%
1940	244		−17.3%
1950	223		−8.6%
1960	161		−27.8%
1970	139		−13.7%
1980	139		0.0%
1990	118		−15.1%
2000	77		−34.7%
2010	12		−84.4%
2020	9		−25.0%
2025 (est.)	6		−33.3%
U.S. Decennial Census; 2020 Census

As of the 2024 American Community Survey, there were 2 estimated households in Churchs Ferry with an average of 2.00 persons per household. The CDP has a median household income of $0. Approximately 0.0% of the CDP's population lives at or below the poverty line. Churchs Ferry has an estimated 25.0% employment rate, with 0.0% of the population holding a bachelor's degree or higher and 100.0% holding a high school diploma. There were 2 housing units at an average density of 4.63 per square mile (1.8/km^{2}).

The top five reported languages (people were allowed to report up to two languages, thus the figures will generally add to more than 100%) were English (100.0%), Spanish (0.0%), Indo-European (0.0%), Asian and Pacific Islander (0.0%), and Other (0.0%).

The median age in the CDP was 63.7 years.

=== 2020 census ===
As of the 2020 census, there were 9 people, 0 households, and 0 families residing in the city. The population density was 20.83 inhabitants per square mile (8.04/km^{2}). There were 4 housing units at an average density of 9.26 per square mile (3.58/km^{2}). The racial makeup of the city was 100.00% White.

=== 2010 census ===
As of the 2010 census, there were 12 people, 5 households, and 5 families residing in the city. The population density was 27.91 inhabitants per square mile (10.78/km^{2}). There were 5 housing units at an average density of 11.63 per square mile (4.49/km^{2}). The racial makeup of the city was 100.00% White.

There were 5 households, of which 20.0% had children under the age of 18 living with them and 100.0% were married couples living together. 0.0% of all households were made up of individuals. The average household size was 2.40 and the average family size was 2.40.

The median age in the city was 48.5 years. 8.3% of residents were under the age of 18; 8.3% were between the ages of 18 and 24; 25% were from 25 to 44; 58.4% were from 45 to 64; and 0.0% were 65 years of age or older. The gender makeup of the city was 50.0% male and 50.0% female.

=== 2000 census ===
As of the 2000 census, there were 77 people, 33 households, and 26 families residing in the city. The population density was 178.25 inhabitants per square mile (68.82/km^{2}). There were 46 housing units at an average density of 106.49 per square mile (41.12/km^{2}). The racial makeup of the city was 100.00% White.

There were 33 households, out of which 21.2% had children under the age of 18 living with them, 63.6% were married couples living together, 9.1% had a female householder with no husband present, and 21.2% were non-families. 21.2% of all households were made up of individuals, and 12.1% had someone living alone who was 65 years of age or older. The average household size was 2.33 and the average family size was 2.50.

In the city, the population was spread out, with 19.5% under the age of 18, 3.9% from 18 to 24, 23.4% from 25 to 44, 36.4% from 45 to 64, and 16.9% who were 65 years of age or older. The median age was 48 years. For every 100 females, there were 102.6 males. For every 100 females age 18 and over, there were 106.7 males.

The median income for a household in the city was $33,438, and the median income for a family was $60,313. Males had a median income of $30,625 versus $33,750 for females. The per capita income for the city was $18,327. None of the population and none of the families were below the poverty line.

== Transportation ==
Amtrak’s Empire Builder, which operates between Seattle/Portland and Chicago, passes through the town on BNSF tracks, but makes no stop. The nearest station is located in Devils Lake, 20 miles (32 km) to the southeast.

== Education ==
The area is served by the Leeds Public School District 6. It operates the Leeds School. In the 2025-26 academic year, the district reported a total of 142 students.
