= Webster, North Dakota =

Webster
- Unincorporated community
- Location within the state of North Dakota Webster (the United States)
- Coordinates: 48°16′56″N 98°52′34″W
- Country: United States
- State: North Dakota
- County: Ramsey
- Elevation: 1,467 ft (447 m)
- Time zone: UTC-6 (Central (CST))
  - Summer (DST): UTC-5 (CDT)
- ZIP codes: 58382
- Area code: 701
- GNIS feature ID: 1032711

Webster is an unincorporated community in central Ramsey County, North Dakota, United States. It lies along North Dakota Highway 20 north of the city of Devils Lake, the county seat of Ramsey County. Its elevation is 1,467 feet (447 m). it had a post office, with the ZIP code 58382 which originated in 1903.
