= Cando, North Dakota =

City in North Dakota, United States

- City
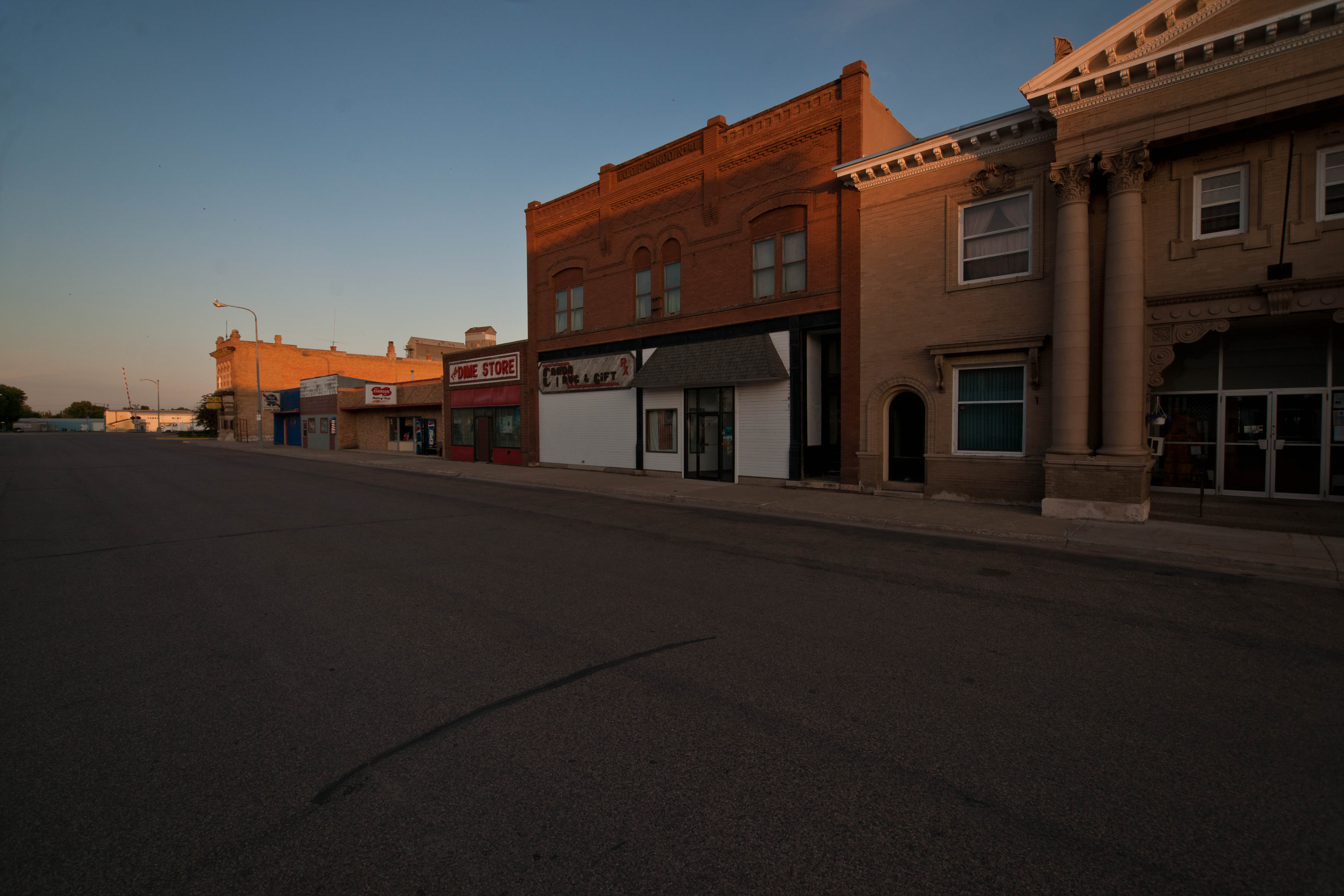
- Business district in Cando
- Motto: "Duck Hunting Capital Of North Dakota"
- Location of Cando, North Dakota
- Coordinates: 48°29′14″N 99°12′09″W
- Country: United States
- State: North Dakota
- County: Towner
- Founded: 1884

Government
  - Mayor: Rollie Bjornstad

Area
  - Total: 0.64 sq mi (1.66 km^{2})
  - Land: 0.64 sq mi (1.66 km^{2})
  - Water: 0 sq mi (0.00 km^{2})
- Elevation: 1,486 ft (453 m)

Population (2020)
  - Total: 1,117
  - Estimate (2022): 1,064
  - Density: 1,739.8/sq mi (671.75/km^{2})
- Time zone: UTC-6 (Central (CST))
  - Summer (DST): UTC-5 (CDT)
- ZIP code: 58324
- Area code: 701
- FIPS code: 38-11860
- GNIS feature ID: 1035952
- Highways: US 281, ND 17
- Website: candond.com

Cando (/ˈkænduː/ KAN-doo) is a city in Towner County, North Dakota, United States. It is the county seat of Towner County. The population was 1,117 at the 2020 census. Cando was founded in 1884.

== History ==
Cando was founded in 1884 as the seat of the newly formed Towner County. It was named from the pioneers' "can do" spirit. The Great Northern Railway was extended to Cando in 1888.

Just west of Cando, Dunkers Colony was founded by settlers from Indiana in 1894. The settlement later changed its name to Zion, and all that is left today is a cemetery west of Cando.

== Geography ==
According to the United States Census Bureau, the city has a total area of 0.63 square miles (1.63 km^{2}), all land.

== Demographics ==
Historical population
Census	Pop.	Note	%±
1890	200		—
1900	1,061		430.5%
1910	1,332		25.5%
1920	1,111		−16.6%
1930	1,164		4.8%
1940	1,282		10.1%
1950	1,530		19.3%
1960	1,566		2.4%
1970	1,512		−3.4%
1980	1,496		−1.1%
1990	1,564		4.5%
2000	1,342		−14.2%
2010	1,115		−16.9%
2020	1,117		0.2%
2022 (est.)	1,064		−4.7%
U.S. Decennial Census; 2020 Census

== Education ==
Its school district is North Star Schools. It was in the Cando School District until 2008, when it merged with Bisbee-Egeland School District into North Star.

== Notable people ==
- Dick Armey, U.S. representative from Texas and House majority leader
- Dave Osborn, running back for the Minnesota Vikings
- Fountain L. Thompson, U.S. senator from North Dakota

== Climate ==
This climatic region is typified by large seasonal temperature differences, with warm to hot (and often humid) summers and cold (sometimes severely cold) winters. According to the Köppen Climate Classification system, Cando has a humid continental climate, abbreviated "Dfb" on climate maps.

Highest Recorded Temperature	Years on Record: 110

	ANN	JAN	FEB	MAR	APR	MAY	JUN	JUL	AUG	SEP	OCT	NOV	DEC
°F	105	48	56	87	94	103	104	105	104	100	97	83	58

Lowest Recorded Temperature	Years on Record: 110

	ANN	JAN	FEB	MAR	APR	MAY	JUN	JUL	AUG	SEP	OCT	NOV	DEC
°F	-49	-49	-47	-45	-7	8	21	29	24	10	-5	-27	-42
