= Cando School District =

Defunct school district in North Dakota, USA

Cando School District was a school district headquartered in Cando, North Dakota.

== History ==
Circa 1970 the Cando School District switched from coal heating to electric heating. In 1980 the district was considering reverting to coal heating. This was due to an increase in the money it had to spend on energy bills.

In 2008 the Bisbee-Egeland School District and the Cando School District were dissolved and merged into the current North Star School District. The Bisbee-Engeland School immediately closed with all students sent to Cando. In Cando, the vote succeeded with 351 approving and 10 disapproving. In October 2007 people in the Bisbee-Egeland district voted to consolidate with 189 for and 16 against.
