= Devils Lake Wetland Management District =

- IUCN category IV (habitat/species management area)
- Interactive map of Devils Lake Wetland Management District
- Location: Foster and Eddy Counties, North Dakota, United States
- Nearest city: Devils Lake, North Dakota
- Area: 48,066 acres (194.52 km^{2})
- Established: 1962
- Governing body: U.S. Fish and Wildlife Service
- Website: Devils Lake Wetland Management District

Devils Lake Wetland Management District is located in the heart of the Prairie Pothole Region of the United States. The District was established in 1962 to purchase and protect wetland habitat for migratory waterfowl and other wildlife in northeastern North Dakota. One of the primary objectives of Devils Lake Wetland Management District is to provide wetland and grassland habitat for waterfowl in the spring and summer for nesting and feeding. The other primary objective is to provide migration habitat for waterfowl in the spring and fall.

The District's headquarters is in Devils Lake, North Dakota. Counties within the District include Benson, Cavalier, Grand Forks, Pembina, Ramsey, Towner and Walsh.

The District manages 209 waterfowl production areas totaling 48,066 acres (194.52 km^{2}), 154,957 acres of wetland easements, 3,740 acres (15.1 km^{2}) of grassland easements, and 18,666 acres (75.54 km^{2}) of easement refuges.
