= Bisbee-Egeland School District =

School district headquartered in Bisbee, North Dakota, US

District information
- Established: 1980
- Closed: 2008 (merged to become part of North Star Schools)

Bisbee-Egeland School District was a school district headquartered in Bisbee, North Dakota.

== History ==
In 1980 Bisbee and Egeland school systems, West Central School District 12 and East Central School District 12, respectively, consolidated. At first there were two campuses, with Egeland hosting the elementary school (grades K-6) and Bisbee hosting the secondary school (grades 7-12).

All students were consolidated to the campus in Bisbee in 2002. The Egeland school had a $50,000 per year operating cost, was not in compliance with fire safety laws, and had 32 students in the 2002-2003 school year. The Towner County Historical Society took control of the Egeland School.

In the 2006-2007 school year, there were 56 students. In the 2007-2008 school year enrollment was under 50. By 2007 Bisbee-Egeland and the Cando School District began sharing a superintendent, athletics, and faculty.

In October 2007 people in the Bisbee-Egeland district voted to consolidate into another district with 189 for and 16 against. In Cando, the vote succeeded with 351 approving and 10 disapproving.

In 2008 the Bisbee-Egeland School District and the Cando district were dissolved and merged into the current North Star Schools. The Bisbee-Engeland School immediately closed with all students sent to Cando. All Bisbee-Egeland employees kept jobs in the new North Star District. At the time the school had no 11th grade students, so the incoming North Star district got no 12th grade students.

In the end the Bisbee-Egeland School had 42 students, with the class size being 3.2 students on average, a decline from around 25 per graduating class for the Bisbee School in the 1960s and 1980s.
