= Ramsey County, North Dakota =

County in North Dakota, United States

- County
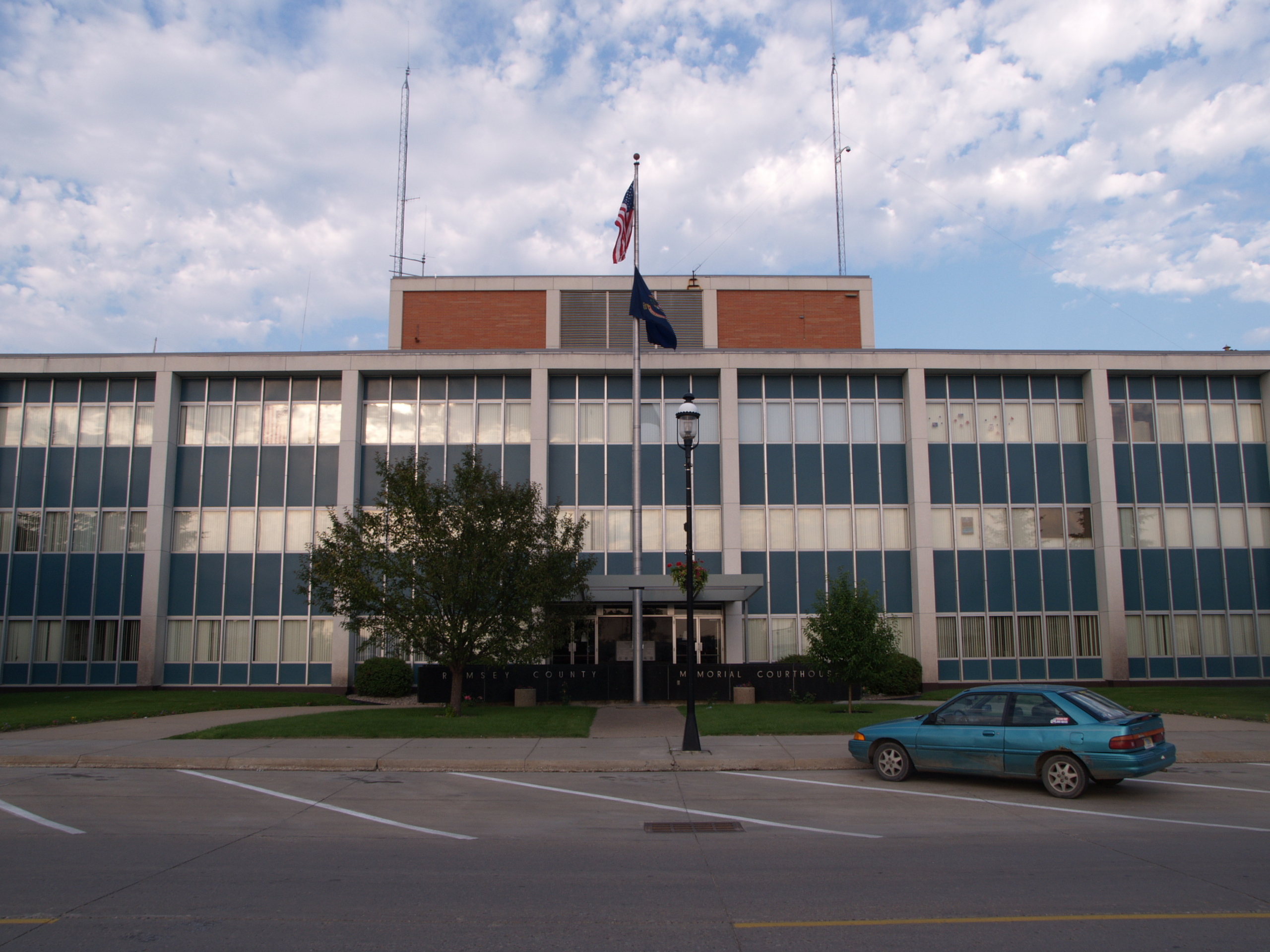
- The Ramsey County Courthouse in Devils Lake

- Location within the U.S. state of North Dakota
- Coordinates: 48.266163°N 98.739031°W
- Country: United States
- State: North Dakota
- Founded: January 4, 1873 (created); January 25, 1883 (organized)
- Named for: Alexander Ramsey
- Seat: Devils Lake
- Largest city: Devils Lake

Area
  - Total: 1,301.006 sq mi (3,369.59 km^{2})
  - Land: 1,185.367 sq mi (3,070.09 km^{2})
  - Water: 115.639 sq mi (299.50 km^{2}) 8.89%

Population (2020)
  - Total: 11,605
  - Estimate (2025): 11,530 ▼
  - Density: 9.709/sq mi (3.749/km^{2})
- Time zone: UTC−6 (Central)
  - Summer (DST): UTC−5 (CDT)
- Area code: 701
- Congressional district: At-large
- Website: ramseycountynd.gov

Ramsey County is a county in the U.S. state of North Dakota. As of the 2020 census, the population was 11,605, and was estimated to be 11,530 in 2025. The county seat and the largest city is Devils Lake.

== History ==
The Dakota Territory legislature created the county on January 4, 1873, with areas partitioned from Pembina County. The county was named for Alexander Ramsey, a U.S. Senator from Minnesota and the first Minnesota Territorial Governor. The county government was not completed at that time, and the county was not attached to another county for administrative or judicial purposes. This situation continued until January 25, 1883, when the county government was affected.

The county's boundaries were altered twice in March 1883, twice more in 1885, and again in 1890. Its present boundaries have remained unchanged since 1890.

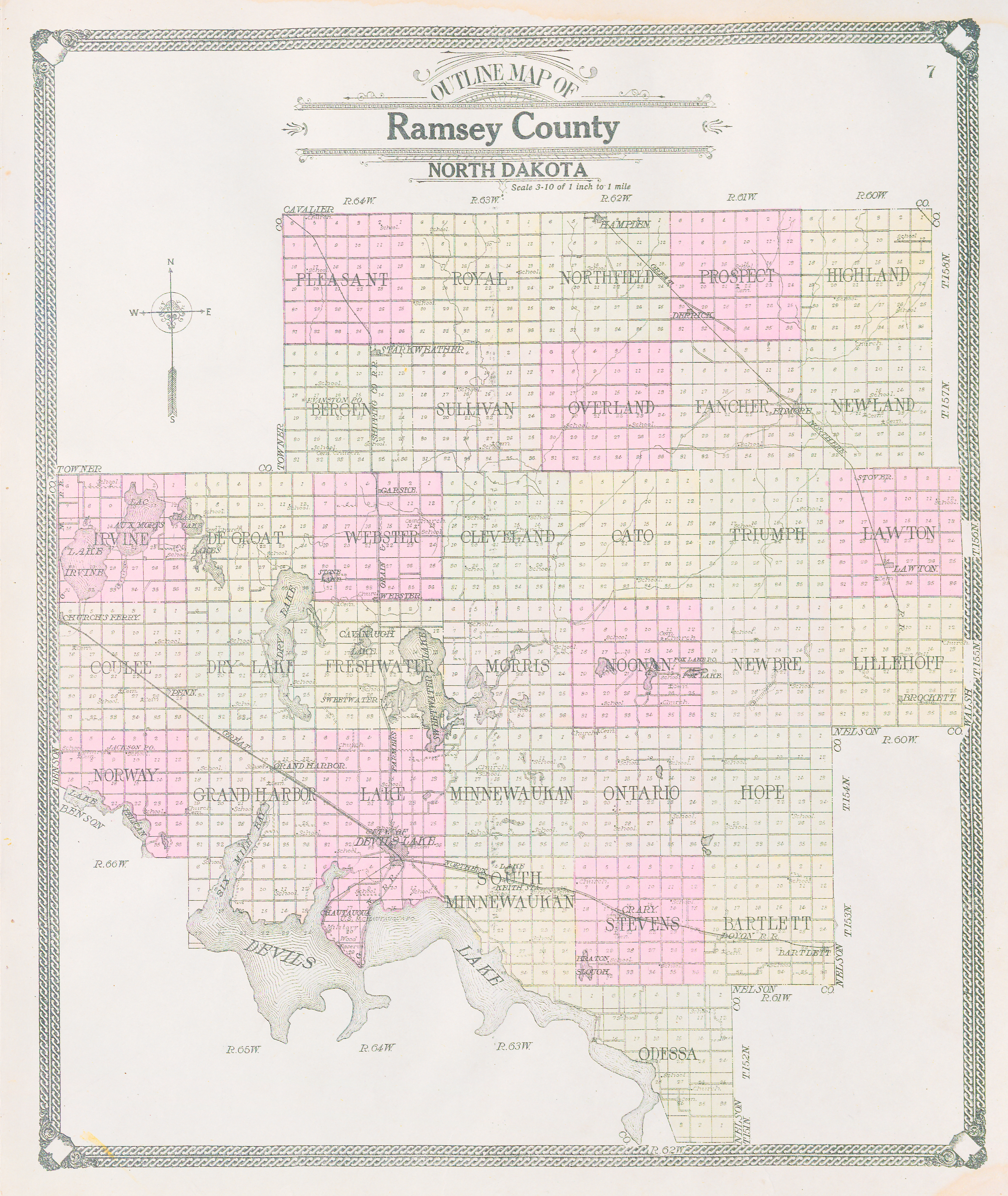
Outline map of Ramsey County, North Dakota, 1909

== Geography ==
The southwest boundary of Ramsey County is defined by Devils Lake. The county terrain consists of rolling hills, dotted with lakes and ponds. The area is largely devoted to agriculture. The terrain slopes to the lake, with its highest point at the NE county corner, at 1,631 ft (497 m) ASL.

According to the United States Census Bureau, the county has a total area of 1,301.006 square miles (3,369.59 km^{2}), of which 1,185.367 square miles (3,070.09 km^{2}) is land and 115.639 square miles (299.50 km^{2}) (%) is water. It is the 26th largest county in North Dakota by total area.

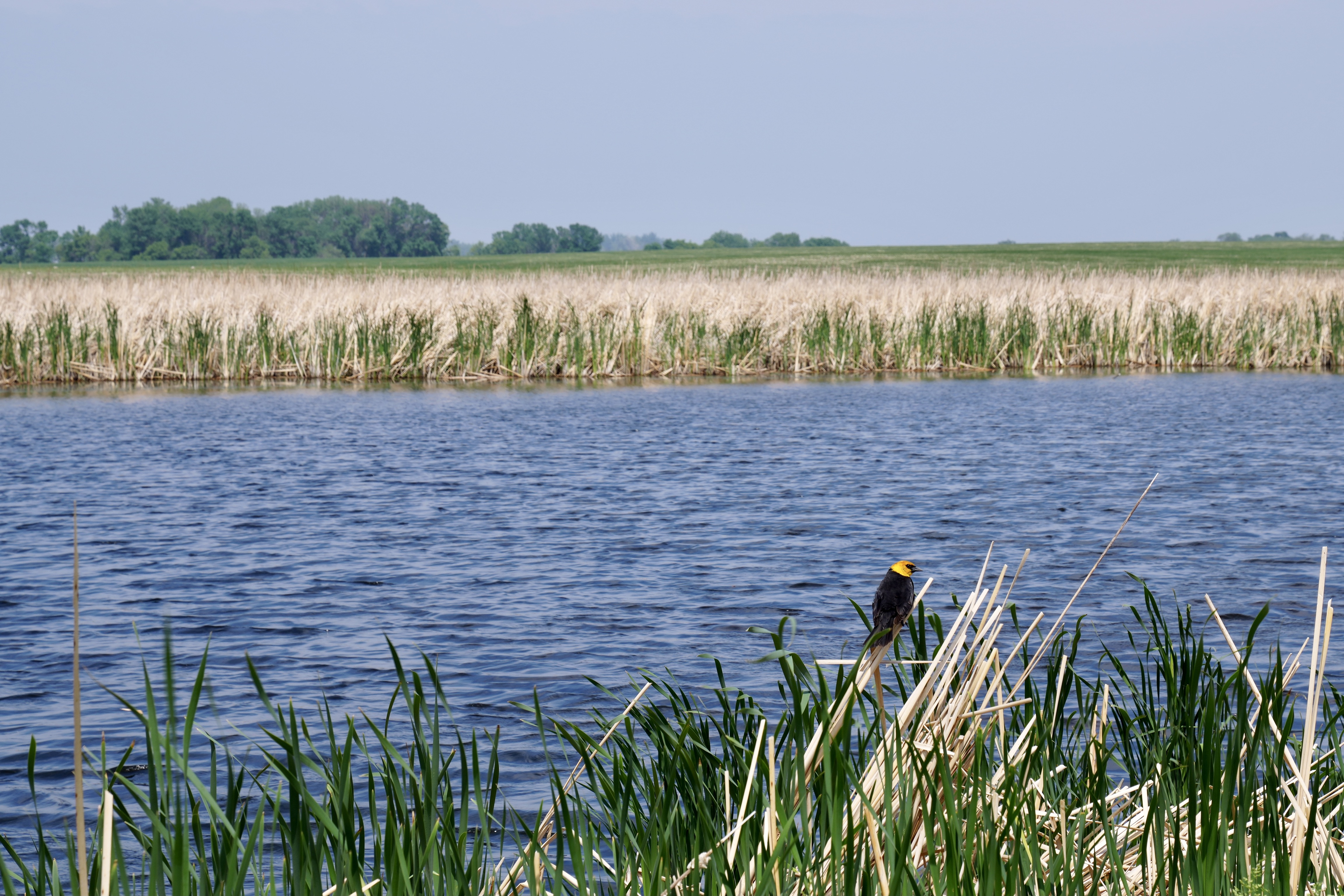
Ramsey County is beautiful “pothole country” In the center of a migratory bird flyway.

=== Major highways ===
- U.S. Highway 2
- U.S. Highway 281
- North Dakota Highway 1
- North Dakota Highway 17
- North Dakota Highway 19
- North Dakota Highway 20
- North Dakota Highway 57

=== Transit ===
- Amtrak Empire Builder (Devils Lake station)
- Devils Lake Transit

=== Adjacent counties ===
- Cavalier County - north
- Walsh County - east
- Nelson County - southeast
- Benson County - southwest
- Towner County - northwest

=== National protected areas ===
- Lake Alice National Wildlife Refuge (part)
- Silver Lake National Wildlife Refuge (part)

=== Lakes ===
- Chain Lake
- Creel Bay
- Dry Lake
- East Devils Lake
- Lake Alice
- Lake Irvine
- Mikes Lake
- Morrison Lake
- Sixmile Bay
- Sweetwater Lake

== Demographics ==
Historical population
Census	Pop.	Note	%±
1880	281		—
1890	4,418		1,472.2%
1900	9,198		108.2%
1910	15,199		65.2%
1920	15,427		1.5%
1930	16,252		5.3%
1940	15,626		−3.9%
1950	14,373		−8.0%
1960	13,443		−6.5%
1970	12,915		−3.9%
1980	13,048		1.0%
1990	12,681		−2.8%
2000	12,066		−4.8%
2010	11,451		−5.1%
2020	11,605		1.3%
2025 (est.)	11,530	▼	−0.6%
U.S. Decennial Census; 1790–1960 1900–1990; 1990–2000 2010–2020

As of the fourth quarter of 2024, the median home value in Ramsey County was $209,156.

As of the 2023 American Community Survey, there are 5,185 estimated households in Ramsey County with an average of 2.14 persons per household. The county has a median household income of $61,319. Approximately 12.4% of the county's population lives at or below the poverty line. Ramsey County has an estimated 67.7% employment rate, with 27.6% of the population holding a bachelor's degree or higher and 93.1% holding a high school diploma.

The top five reported ancestries (people were allowed to report up to two ancestries, thus the figures will generally add to more than 100%) were English (95.7%), Spanish (0.4%), Indo-European (1.5%), Asian and Pacific Islander (0.9%), and Other (1.4%).

The median age in the county was 40.2 years.

Ramsey County, North Dakota – racial and ethnic composition
Note: the US Census treats Hispanic/Latino as an ethnic category. This table excludes Latinos from the racial categories and assigns them to a separate category. Hispanics/Latinos may be of any race.

Race / ethnicity (NH = non-Hispanic)	Pop. 1980	Pop. 1990	Pop. 2000	Pop. 2010	Pop. 2020
White alone (NH)	12,662 (97.04%)	12,001 (94.64%)	11,112 (92.09%)	9,980 (87.15%)	9,354 (80.60%)
Black or African American alone (NH)	5 (0.04%)	20 (0.16%)	22 (0.18%)	41 (0.36%)	73 (0.63%)
Native American or Alaska Native alone (NH)	331 (2.54%)	577 (4.55%)	639 (5.30%)	964 (8.42%)	1,227 (10.57%)
Asian alone (NH)	15 (0.11%)	29 (0.23%)	31 (0.26%)	45 (0.39%)	72 (0.62%)
Pacific Islander alone (NH)	—	—	3 (0.02%)	5 (0.04%)	10 (0.09%)
Other race alone (NH)	6 (0.05%)	5 (0.04%)	4 (0.03%)	4 (0.03%)	8 (0.07%)
Mixed race or multiracial (NH)	—	—	192 (1.59%)	275 (2.40%)	587 (5.06%)
Hispanic or Latino (any race)	29 (0.22%)	49 (0.39%)	63 (0.52%)	137 (1.20%)	274 (2.36%)
Total	13,048 (100.00%)	12,681 (100.00%)	12,066 (100.00%)	11,451 (100.00%)	11,605 (100.00%)

=== 2024 estimate ===
As of the 2024 estimate, there were 11,510 people and 5,185 households residing in the county. There were 5,899 housing units at an average density of 4.98 per square mile (1.9/km^{2}). The racial makeup of the county was 82.7% White (81.2% NH White), 1.1% African American, 11.8% Native American, 1.1% Asian, 0.1% Pacific Islander, _% from some other races and 3.2% from two or more races. Hispanic or Latino people of any race were 3.0% of the population.

=== 2020 census ===
As of the 2020 census, there were 11,605 people, 4,947 households, and 2,883 families residing in the county. The population density was 9.8 inhabitants per square mile (3.8/km^{2}). There were 5,843 housing units at an average density of 4.93 per square mile (1.9/km^{2}); 15.3% were vacant, the homeowner vacancy rate was 2.0%, and the rental vacancy rate was 13.4%.

Of the residents, 23.1% were under the age of 18 and 20.8% were 65 years of age or older; the median age was 40.6 years. For every 100 females there were 101.1 males, and for every 100 females age 18 and over there were 100.3 males.

The racial makeup of the county was 81.3% White, 0.6% Black or African American, 11.0% American Indian and Alaska Native, 0.6% Asian, 0.6% from some other race, and 5.7% from two or more races. Hispanic or Latino residents of any race comprised 2.4% of the population.

There were 4,947 households in the county, of which 26.6% had children under the age of 18 living with them and 25.4% had a female householder with no spouse or partner present. About 35.2% of all households were made up of individuals and 15.1% had someone living alone who was 65 years of age or older.

Among occupied housing units, 64.0% were owner-occupied and 36.0% were renter-occupied.

=== 2010 census ===
As of the 2010 census, there were 11,451 people, 4,955 households, and 3,008 families residing in the county. The population density was 9.65 inhabitants per square mile (3.7/km^{2}). There were 5,615 housing units at an average density of 4.73 per square mile (1.8/km^{2}). The racial makeup of the county was 87.72% White, 0.36% African American, 8.68% Native American, 0.39% Asian, 0.04% Pacific Islander, 0.24% from some other races and 2.57% from two or more races. Hispanic or Latino people of any race were 1.20% of the population.

In terms of ancestry, 41.9% were German, 37.7% were Norwegian, 7.0% were Irish, 5.7% were Swedish, 5.2% were English, and 2.9% were American.

There were 4,955 households, 27.5% had children under the age of 18 living with them, 47.0% were married couples living together, 9.5% had a female householder with no husband present, 39.3% were non-families, and 34.5% of all households were made up of individuals. The average household size was 2.21 and the average family size was 2.82. The median age was 43.0 years.

The median income for a household in the county was $41,792 and the median income for a family was $56,632. Males had a median income of $41,274 versus $25,171 for females. The per capita income for the county was $24,130. About 8.7% of families and 11.5% of the population were below the poverty line, including 16.7% of those under age 18 and 15.4% of those age 65 or over.

== Communities ==
=== Cities ===
- Brocket
- Crary
- Devils Lake (county seat)
- Edmore
- Hampden
- Lawton
- Starkweather

=== Unincorporated communities ===
- Bartlett
- Churchs Ferry
- Darby
- Derrick
- Doyon
- Essex
- Garske
- Grand Harbor
- Keith
- Lakewood Park
- Penn
- Ramsey
- Rohrville
- Saint Joe
- Southam
- Sweetwater
- Webster

=== Townships ===
- Bartlett
- Cato
- Chain Lakes
- Coulee
- Creel
- De Groat
- Dry Lake
- Fancher
- Freshwater
- Grand Harbor
- Hammer
- Harding
- Highland Center
- Hope
- Klingstrup
- Lawton
- Lillehoff
- Minnewaukan
- Morris
- Newbre
- Newland
- Noonan
- North Creel
- Northfield
- Odessa
- Ontario
- Overland
- Pelican
- Poplar Grove
- Prospect
- Royal
- South Minnewaukan
- Stevens
- Sullivan
- Triumph
- Webster

== Politics ==
Ramsey County voters have traditionally voted Republican. In only two national elections since 1944 has the county selected the Democratic Party candidate (as of 2024).

United States presidential election results for Ramsey County, North Dakota
Year	Republican		Democratic		Third party(ies)	
Year	No.	%	No.	%	No.	%
1900	1,147	67.79%	496	29.31%	49	2.90%
1904	1,523	76.46%	386	19.38%	83	4.17%
1908	1,480	55.79%	1,072	40.41%	101	3.81%
1912	739	32.19%	917	39.94%	640	27.87%
1916	1,169	44.91%	1,331	51.13%	103	3.96%
1920	3,996	79.33%	937	18.60%	104	2.06%
1924	3,110	62.35%	359	7.20%	1,519	30.45%
1928	3,246	54.62%	2,672	44.96%	25	0.42%
1932	1,917	30.29%	4,337	68.53%	75	1.19%
1936	1,784	25.51%	4,559	65.19%	650	9.30%
1940	3,629	50.44%	3,530	49.07%	35	0.49%
1944	2,505	49.28%	2,539	49.95%	39	0.77%
1948	2,891	52.04%	2,458	44.25%	206	3.71%
1952	4,670	71.97%	1,794	27.65%	25	0.39%
1956	3,821	64.44%	2,103	35.46%	6	0.10%
1960	3,599	56.12%	2,813	43.86%	1	0.02%
1964	2,409	40.24%	3,572	59.66%	6	0.10%
1968	3,189	54.56%	2,384	40.79%	272	4.65%
1972	3,954	61.78%	2,384	37.25%	62	0.97%
1976	3,293	50.65%	3,096	47.62%	113	1.74%
1980	4,078	64.88%	1,607	25.57%	600	9.55%
1984	4,150	63.33%	2,304	35.16%	99	1.51%
1988	3,103	53.12%	2,665	45.63%	73	1.25%
1992	2,516	41.56%	2,008	33.17%	1,530	25.27%
1996	2,077	43.51%	2,123	44.47%	574	12.02%
2000	3,005	60.38%	1,658	33.31%	314	6.31%
2004	2,943	60.06%	1,885	38.47%	72	1.47%
2008	2,361	49.58%	2,314	48.59%	87	1.83%
2012	2,665	53.31%	2,164	43.29%	170	3.40%
2016	3,217	60.64%	1,505	28.37%	583	10.99%
2020	3,577	66.59%	1,639	30.51%	156	2.90%
2024	3,609	68.89%	1,513	28.88%	117	2.23%

== Education ==
School districts include:

- Dakota Prairie Public School District 1
- Devils Lake Public School District 1
- Edmore Public School District 2
- Lakota Public School District 66
- Leeds Public School District 6
- Minnewaukan Public School District 5
- North Star School District
- Starkweather Public School District 44
- Warwick Public School District 29

== See also ==
- National Register of Historic Places listings in Ramsey County, North Dakota
