= Mapes =

Mapes may refer to:

== People ==
- Bruce Mapes (1901–1961), American figure skater
- Carl E. Mapes (1874–1939), American politician
- Charlie Mapes (born 1982), English former footballer
- Cliff Mapes (1922–1996), American baseball player
- David P. Mapes (1798–1890), American businessman and politician
- Elias Mapes (1833–1906), American union organizer and politician
- Erwin Kempton Mapes (1884–1961), American scholar of Spanish-American literature
- Elizabeth Bonhôte (1744–1818), née Mapes, English novelist and essayist
- J. A. Mapes (1861–1942), American politician
- James Mapes (1806–1866), American chemist
- Mary Mapes (born 1956), American journalist and television news producer
- Mary Mapes Dodge (1831–1905), née Mapes, American children's writer
- Ted Mapes (1901–1984), American stuntman

== Fictional characters ==
- Shadout Mapes, in the novel Dune and its movie adaptations

== Other uses ==
- Mapes, British Columbia, Canada, a settlement
- Mapes Hotel, a demolished hotel/casino in Reno, Nevada, United States
- Mapes Creek, Seattle, Washington, United States
- Mapes, North Dakota, United States.
- Toe loop jump, sometimes called "Mapes" after its inventor, Bruce Mapes

== See also ==
- Mape (disambiguation)
- Milton Mapes, an American country band
