= Dakota Prairie High School =

Coordinates: 48°00′36″N 98°00′13″W

Location
- 518 4th St; Petersburg, North Dakota 58272; USA

Information
- Type: Public
- Established: Current school system was established 1997
- Superintendent: Jay Slade
- Principal: Clay Johnson
- Staff: 13.00 (FTE)
- Grades: 7–12
- Enrollment: 125 (2023–2024)
- Student to teacher ratio: 9.62
- Colors: Black, teal and white
- Mascot: Knights
- Website: https://www.dakota-prairie.k12.nd.us/

Dakota Prairie High School is part of a school district that covers a portion of Nelson County, North Dakota. It includes the towns of McVille, Michigan City, Tolna, Aneta, Pekin, Kloten, Dahlen, Hamar, Niagera, and Petersburg. There are 132 students currently at Dakota Prairie High School. Dakota Prairie High School is considered a "Class B" school in North Dakota.

== History ==
=== Formation ===
Dakota Prairie first became a new school district on July 1, 1993 when the school districts of the towns of Aneta, McVille, Michigan City, Tolna, and Unity of Petersburg joined together. Originally, there was the elementary school building in McVille, the junior high school building in Tolna, and the high school building in Petersburg. The middle school in Tolna eventually closed down in an attempt to further centralize the district, and was moved to be part of the high school building in Petersburg.

=== Today ===
The Dakota Prairie School District still uses the high school building in Petersburg and the elementary building in McVille for regular classes. Sent to these two schools are 408 students from eleven communities (McVille, Hamar, Tolna, Pekin, Kloten, Aneta, Niagara, Whitman, Petersburg, Dahlen, and Michigan). Students also come from seven different counties in North Dakota: Nelson, Griggs, Grand Forks, Eddy, Walsh, Benson, and Ramsey. The entire school district covers approximately 900 square miles (2,300 km^{2}).

== Campus ==
The campus of Dakota Prairie High School is located in Petersburg. The school building takes up approximately one-half of the city block. The building has eleven classrooms, which include one band and chorus room, one computer lab, two science rooms, and one technology education room. There also are two special education rooms and one gymnasium. A recent weight room has been added onto the school campus for the students and faculty to use.

== Students and teachers ==
Dakota Prairie currently enrolls 132 students, 51% of whom are male, and 49% female. There are currently fourteen teachers who teach full-time. The student to teacher ratio is 9:04. 86% are White, 4% of the students are Native American, 4% are Hispanic, 1% are Asian, 1% are Black, and 2% are two or more races.

As of 2013, the largest class numbered 30 students, which will be the graduating class of 2020.

== Sports ==
Students are allowed to be involved in one or more sports at Dakota Prairie High School as long as they meet certain criteria set by the school. Commonly, this involves passing all classes.

Dakota Prairie is involved in "Class B" North Dakota sports, including football, volleyball, basketball, golf, track and field, and baseball. They generally offer sports in junior varsity divisions and a varsity division. The football and volleyball teams play in the fall, the basketball (both boys' and girls' teams) in the winter, and the baseball, track and field, and golf teams play in the spring.

=== Championships ===
- State class "B" baseball: 1994
- State class "B" baseball runner-up: 2008
- State class "B" basketball runner-up: 2009

== See also ==
- List of High Schools in North Dakota
