= Bep Boon-van der Starp =

Dutch resistance fighter and founder of Madurodam

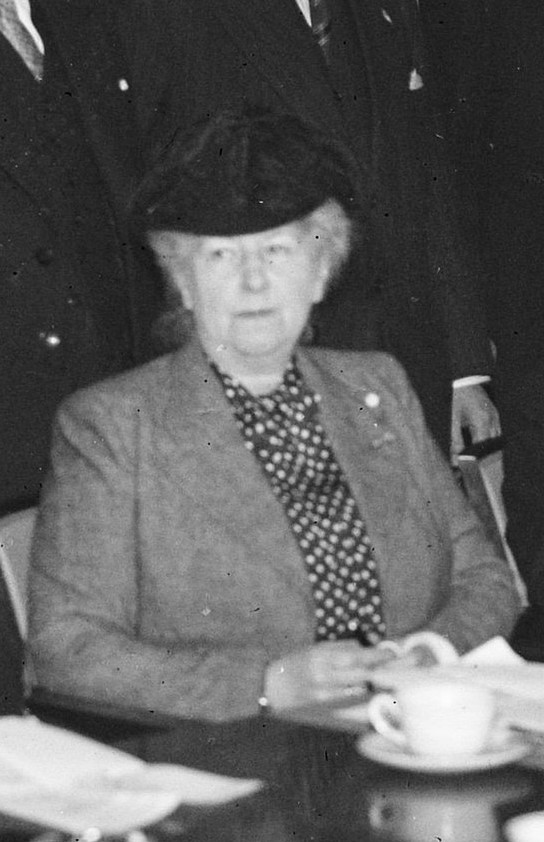
- Born: 31 January 1884; Maassluis, Netherlands
- Died: 9 October 1959 (aged 75); The Hague, Netherlands
- Other names: Bertha van der Starp

Bep Boon-van der Starp (1884 – 1959) was a Dutch resistance fighter and the creative force for the construction of Madurodam.

== Early life and marriage ==
Bertha (known as Bep) van der Starp was born in Maassluis on 31 January 1884. She was married to lawyer Gerard Adolf Boon with whom she had 2 children. The couple were active in the Liberal Union.

== World War II ==
Before and during World War II the couple helped Jews escape from Austria. In 1938 Starp founded the Hague Committee for Refugees (Haagsch Comité voor Vluchtelingen). In 1940 the couple fled to the United Kingdom with their son. Their daughter Els Boon stayed in Leiden, active as a member of the student resistance.

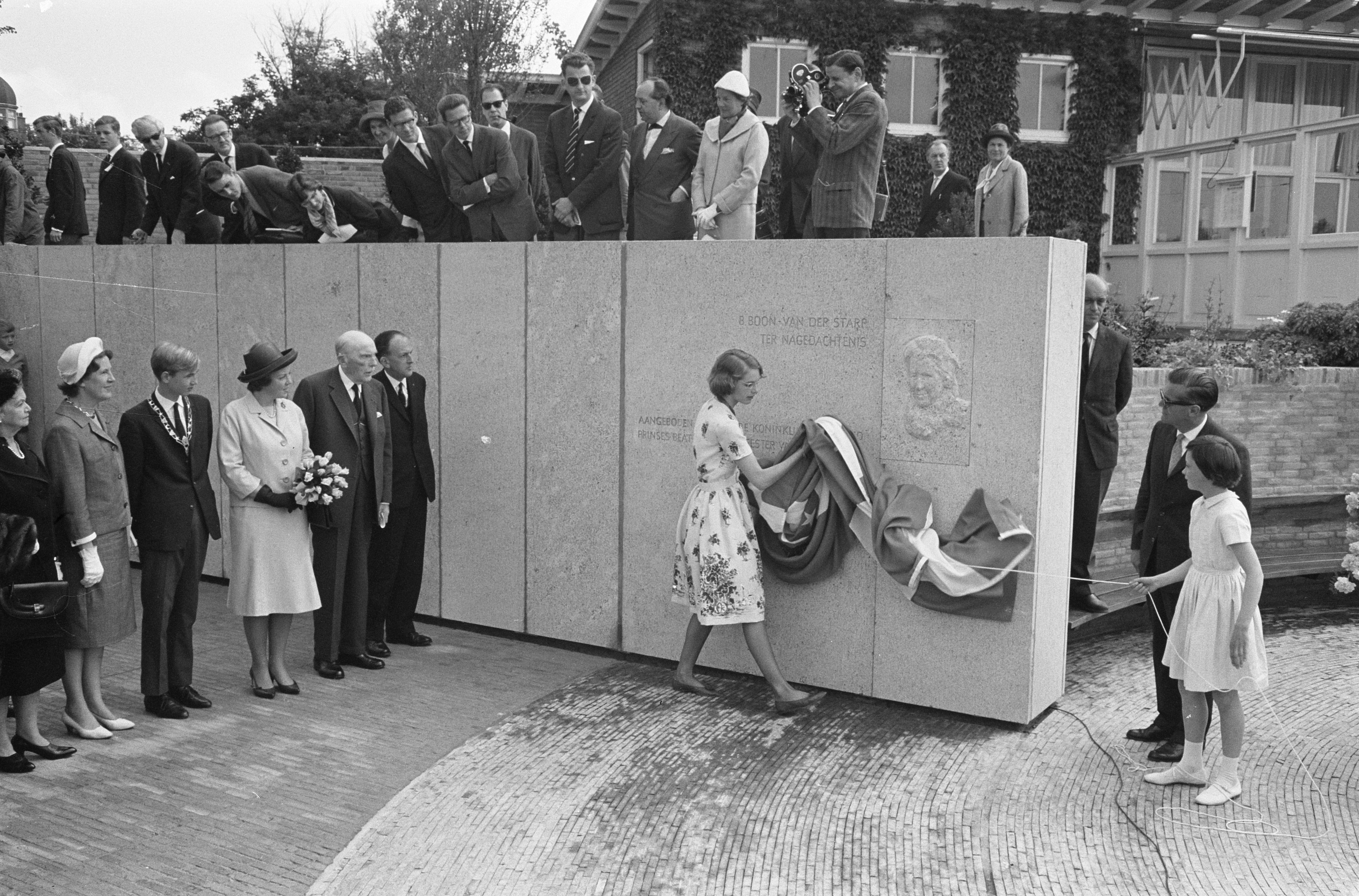
Bas relief of Mrs B. Boon van der Starp being unveiled by René Glastra van Loon in 1962.

== Fundraising ==
The Boon-van der Starps returned to the Netherlands after the war. In 1947, Starp chaired the welfare board of the Nederlands Studenten Sanatorium (Dutch Student Sanatorium) which was located in Laren and served as a hospital to treat students with tuberculosis. In order to raise operating funds for the hospital, Starp headed the creation of Madurodam. Madurodam was a visitor attraction in built in The Hague. It is a miniature city which opened in 1952. It was named in honour of George Maduro (1916 – 1945) a Dutch war hero, with funds provided by his parents.

Starp died in The Hague on 9 October 1959. In 1962 the Bep Boon-van der Starp Memorial was dedicated on the grounds of Madurodam.
