= Kloten (disambiguation) =

Kloten may refer to:

- Kloten, a city in Switzerland
- Zurich Airport, the airport in Kloten
- EHC Kloten, an icehockey team
- Kloten, Wisconsin, an unincorporated community
- Kloten, North Dakota, an unincorporated community

== See also ==
- Klotten
