= Hans Brinker and the Silver Skates (film) =

- Based on: Hans Brinker, or The Silver Skates by Mary Mapes Dodge
- Written by: Sally Benson; Frederick Knott (adaptation)
- Directed by: Sidney Lumet; George Schaefer
- Starring: Tab Hunter; Peggy King; Basil Rathbone; Jarmila Novotna; Dick Button
- Music by: Hugh Martin (songs); Franz Allers (musical director)
- Country of origin: United States
- Original language: English

Production
- Producer: George Schaefer
- Running time: 50 minutes
- Production companies: Milberg Productions; Showcase Productions

Original release
- Network: NBC
- Release: February 9, 1958

Hans Brinker and the Silver Skates is a 1958 American television adaptation of the story of Hans Brinker, or The Silver Skates, directed by Sidney Lumet and starring Tab Hunter in the title role. It was broadcast by NBC as part of the Hallmark Hall of Fame.

Lumet and Hunter worked together again on That Kind of Woman later that year.

== Cast ==
- Tab Hunter as Hans Brinker
- Peggy King as Rychie Van Gleck
- Basil Rathbone as Dr Boekman
- Jarmila Novotna as Dame Brinker
- Carmen Mathews as Mevrouw Van Gleck
- Dick Button as Peter Van Gleck
- Ralph Roberts as Raff
- Ellie Sommers as Trinka
- Paul Robertson as Pote

== Production ==
Hunter was cast in part because he was a competitive ice skater when younger, as well as being a singer. He wrote in his memoirs, "At twenty-seven, I was a little long in the tooth to be playing teenage Hans but then there weren't too many actors around could sing and not embarrass themselves on the ice opposite the Olympic iceskating champion Dick Button, who brought incredible pizzazz to the skating scenes. The pay was good for a one-shot show, but to be honest, I'd have paid for the chance to meet, let alone skate with, Dick Button, who was one of my real heroes."

== Reception ==
The production was a huge ratings success, the biggest Hallmark had experienced with 60 million viewers tuning in. It averaged a rating of 25, easily winning its timeslot.

Variety said "It was the Tab Hunter billing that probably piled up the Trendex points" on the show "but it was Dick Button who vested it with whatever elements of a real Dutch treat that remained in this musicallzation of the old children’s classic... The maudlin, goody-goody moralistic overtones weighed heavily... and even the moppets must have found the going getting sticky at times... an uneven production that ran from mediocre and frequently tedious fare to some Spirited and zestful entertainment."

== Songs ==
- “Ice"
- “Trinka Brinker”
- “I’m a Very Lucky Boy/Girl”
- “Clop, Clop, Clop”
- “I Happen to Love You”
- “The More the Merrier”
- “A Job for Me”
- “Hello, Springtime”
- “Hans Brinker”
