= Adler Township, Nelson County, North Dakota =

Adler Township, North Dakota
- Township
- Location within the state of North Dakota
- Coordinates: 47°53′49″N 97°56′10″W
- Country: United States
- State: North Dakota
- County: Nelson
- Settled: c. 1882
- Named after: Charles Adler

Area
  - Total: 35.9 sq mi (93 km^{2})
  - Land: 35.8 sq mi (93 km^{2})
  - Water: 0.1 sq mi (0.26 km^{2})
- Elevation: 1,493 ft (455 m)

Population (2009)
  - Total: 38
  - Density: 1.1/sq mi (0.41/km^{2})
- Time zone: UTC-6 (Central (CST))
  - Summer (DST): UTC-5 (CDT)
- Area code: 701
- FIPS code: 38-00580
- GNIS feature ID: 1036567

Adler Township is one of the twenty-seven townships of Nelson County, North Dakota, United States. Its population during the 2000 Census was 47, and an estimated 38 as of 2009.

== History ==
Alder was originally settled around 1882, when Charles Adler and four associates acquired land in the area and proposed to start a new settlement, to be named Adler, roughly halfway between the present day cities of Petersburg and McVille. Adler itself comes from the German word for eagle. A post office was established in May 1882, with Mr. Adler as its first postmaster. A tavern and hotel soon followed.

Adler soon grew to a small town of around 30 residents, and Mr. Adler expected continued growth since the site was located along the planned route for the Great Northern Railroad. He was quoted as saying "we shall break up at least 1500 acres and push the opening of good farms at once" and that a schoolhouse "second to none" would be built. However, in the fall of 1882 railroad officials opted to build their line 5 miles (8.0 km) to the north, and further settlement of Adler diminished. Adler's post office closed in 1905.

The township, however, continued to attract settlers in the early 1900s, growing from 77 residents in 1890 to a peak population of 305 in 1910.
