= Hans Brinker, or The Silver Skates =

1865 novel by Mary Mapes Dodge

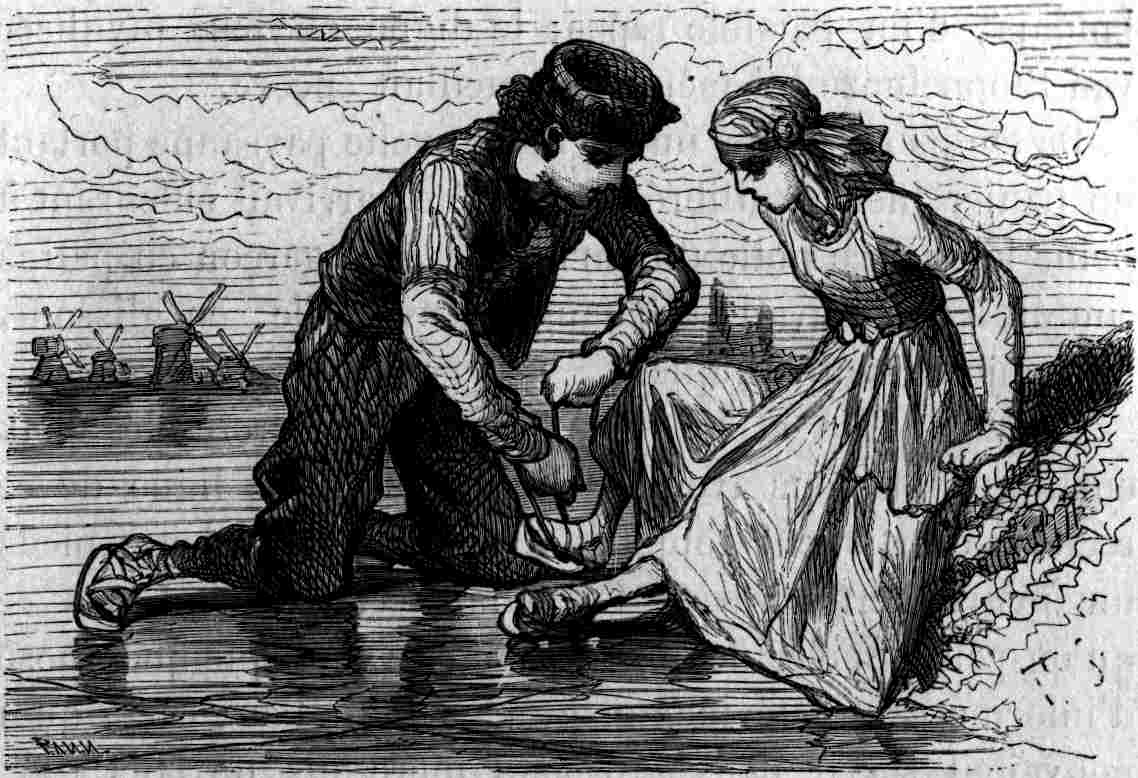
- Hans Brinker tying on his sister Gretel's ice skates, in an illustration by Théophile Schuler from the 1876 French translation of the novel
- Author: Mary Mapes Dodge
- Illustrator: F. O. C. Darley and Thomas Nast
- Language: English
- Genre: Children's novel
- Publisher: James O'Kane
- Publication date: 1865
- Publication place: United States
- Pages: 347 (original edition)

Hans Brinker, or The Silver Skates (full title: Hans Brinker; or, the Silver Skates: A Story of Life in Holland) is a children's novel by American author Mary Mapes Dodge, first published in 1865. The novel takes place in the Netherlands and is a colorful fictional portrait of early 19th-century Dutch life, as well as a tale of youthful honor.

The book's title refers to the beautiful silver skates to be awarded to the winner of the ice-skating race Hans Brinker hopes to enter. The novel introduced the sport of Dutch speed skating to Americans, and as recently as the 1990s U.S. media still saw Hans Brinker as the prototypical speed skater.

The book is also notable for popularizing the story of the little Dutch boy who plugs a dike with his finger.

== Overview ==
Mary Mapes Dodge, who had never visited the Netherlands when the novel was published, wrote the novel at age 34. She was inspired by her reading of John L. Motley's lengthy, multi-volume history works: The Rise of the Dutch Republic (1856), and History of the United Netherlands (1860–1867). Dodge subsequently did further bibliographical research into the country. She also received much firsthand information about Dutch life from her immigrant Dutch neighbors, the Scharffs, and Dodge wrote in her preface to the 1875 edition of the book that the story of Hans Brinker's father was "founded strictly upon fact".

Many of the story's characters have incongruous names that are morphologically German rather than Dutch, or are completely obscure. Some editions of the story contain a footnote explaining that "Ludwig, Gretel, and Carl were named after German friends" and correctly giving Lodewijk, Grietje and Karel as the Dutch-language equivalents. Other names that seem fictitious, such as "Voost", "Broom" or "Rychie", could be corruptions of existing Dutch forms (in this case "Joost", "Bram" and "Riekie"). In Dutch editions of the book, names and other elements were adapted to make the story more believable to Dutch children; hence, translator P.J. Andriessen renamed German-sounding "Gretel" to "Griete" in the first Dutch edition of 1867, and Margreet Bruijn changed the main characters' names to the authentically Dutch regional forms of "Hannes" and "Geertje" in her 1954 adaptation.

Full of Dutch cultural and historical information, the book became an instant bestseller, outselling all other books in its first year of publication except Charles Dickens' Our Mutual Friend. The novel has since been continuously in print, most often in multiple editions and formats, and remains a children's classic.

== Plot ==
In Holland, poor but industrious and honorable 15-year-old Hans Brinker and his younger sister Gretel yearn to participate in December's great ice skating race on the canal. They have little chance of doing well on their handmade wooden skates, but the prospect of the race and the prize of the silver skates excites them and fires their dreams.

Hans' father, Raff Brinker, suffered head trauma when he fell from a dike. It left him chronically ill, with episodes of amnesia and occasional violent outbursts, so he is unable to work. Mrs. Brinker, Hans, and Gretel must all work to support the family and are looked down upon in the community because they are poor. By chance, Hans meets the famous surgeon Dr. Boekman and begs him to treat their father, but the doctor's fees are expensive and he has been very gruff following the death of his wife and disappearance of his son. Eventually, Dr. Boekman is persuaded to examine Mr. Brinker. He diagnoses pressure on the brain, which can be cured by a risky and expensive operation involving trephining (a surgical intervention in which a hole is drilled or scraped into the human skull). This has been recognized as an early description of chronic subdural hematoma.

Hans earns money to buy Gretel a pair of steel skates for the race. Later, when he earns enough to buy himself a pair of skates, he instead offers the money to Doctor Boekman to pay for his father's operation. Touched by this gesture, Dr. Boekman provides the surgery for free, and Hans is able to buy good skates for himself to skate in the race. Hans sacrifices his opportunity to win the boys' race by dropping out of the race to help a friend win. Gretel wins the girls' race and the precious prize: the eponymous Silver Skates.

Mr. Brinker's operation is successful, and he is restored to health and memory. Dr. Boekman is also changed, losing his gruff demeanour when he is reunited with his lost son through the unexpected help of Mr. Brinker. The Brinkers' fortunes are changed further by the almost miraculous recovery of Mr. Brinker's savings, which had been thought lost or stolen ten years ago.

The Brinker parents live a long and happy life. Dr. Boekman helps Hans go to medical school, and Hans becomes a successful doctor. Gretel also grows up to enjoy a happy adult life.

=== Medical history ===
The description of the father's medical condition has been recognized as an early description of chronic subdural hematoma.

== Film adaptations ==
Hans Brinker, or The Silver Skates has been adapted into several films and plays, all of which center on the dramatic ice-skating competition as the climax of the story, in keeping with the book. The film adaptations include:

- A 1958 Hallmark Hall of Fame live television musical, Hans Brinker and the Silver Skates, directed by Sidney Lumet and starring Tab Hunter as Hans.
- A 1962 made-for-television Disney film, starring Rony Zeaner. Shown in two parts in the U.S. on the Walt Disney anthology television series.
- A 1969 NBC made-for-television musical film, starring Robin Askwith as Hans.
- A 1991 Australian animated television film produced by Burbank Animation Studios.
- A 1998 very loose modern adaptation or homage, Brink!, a Disney Channel original movie. The story takes place in Los Angeles, California, and centers on competitive inline skating rather than ice skating. It stars Erik von Detten as Andy "Brink" Brinker.
- A 2020 Russian film, The Silver Skates, is a free retelling of the book, the events of the plot take place in the pre-Christmas St. Petersburg of 1899.

== Popular culture: the legend of the boy and the dike ==
A short story within the novel has become well known in its own right in popular culture. The story, read aloud in a schoolroom in England, is about a Dutch boy who saves his country by putting his finger in a leaking dike. The boy stays there all night, in spite of the cold, until the villagers find him and repair the dike.

Found in Chapter 18 "Friends in Need", the boy and the story are called simply "The Hero of Haarlem". Although the hero of the dike-plugging tale is nameless in the book, Hans Brinker's name has sometimes erroneously been associated with the character.

This small tale within Hans Brinker or The Silver Skates has generated numerous versions and adaptations in media. American poet Phoebe Cary—at whose New York City literary gatherings Dodge was a regular guest—wrote a lengthy poem about it called "The Leak in the Dike", published posthumously in 1873, which was subsequently widely anthologized in books for schoolchildren during the period through the 1920s. Cary also gave the boy a name: Peter.

The tale has also inspired full-fledged children's books of its own, which include:

- The Hole in the Dike, by Norma Green (1974)
- The Boy Who Held Back the Sea, by Lenny Hort (1987)

=== Statues of the boy and the dike ===
For tourism purposes, statues of the fictional dike-plugging boy have been erected in Dutch locations such as Spaarndam, Madurodam and Harlingen. The statues are sometimes mistakenly titled "Hans Brinker"; others are known as "Peter of Haarlem". The story of the dike-plugging boy is, however, not widely known in the Netherlands—it is a piece of American, rather than Dutch, folklore.

=== Origin of the story of the boy and the dike ===
Versions of the story prior to Hans Brinker appear in several English-language publications from 1850 onward, including the following British and American publications:

In the U.S.:

- Harper's Magazine, August 1850: "The Little Hero of Haarlem"
- The 1852 edition of The Ladies' Repository: "The Little Hero of Haarlem"
- In 1854, Literary Gem: Van Court's New Monthly Magazine: "The Little Hero of Haarlem"
- Julia Matilda Olin's 1856 book, A Winter at Wood Lawn
- In 1857, McGuffey's New High School Reader for Advanced Classes: "The Little Hero of Haarlem"
- In 1858, The Rhode Island Schoolmaster: "The Boy at the Dike"
- In 1858/1859, Sargent's School Monthly: "The Boy at the Dike"

In the United Kingdom:

- An 1850 edition of Sharpe's London Journal of Entertainment and Instruction: "The Little Hero of Haarlem"
- The February 23, 1850, edition of Eliza Cook's Journal: "The Brave Little Hollander"
- The 1855 edition of Beeton's Boys' Own magazine: "The Little Dutch Hero"
- The 'Sixth' Standard Reader, compiled by J. S. Laurie (1863): "The Little Dutch Hero"

The actual authorship and genesis of the story of the boy and the dike is probably the story "Le Petit Éclusier" by prolific French children's author Eugenie Foa (1796–1852), first published in 1848. This appeared in an English translation by Sarah West Lander, titled "The Little Dykeman" and attributed to Foa, in the monthly magazine Merry's Museum for Boys and Girls in March 1868.

Although Dodge was not the originator of the story of the boy and the dike, the immense popularity of her novel Hans Brinker, or The Silver Skates made the story very widely known. The story within a story of the nameless little boy's heroism also parallels and emphasizes Hans Brinker's own heroism in the novel.

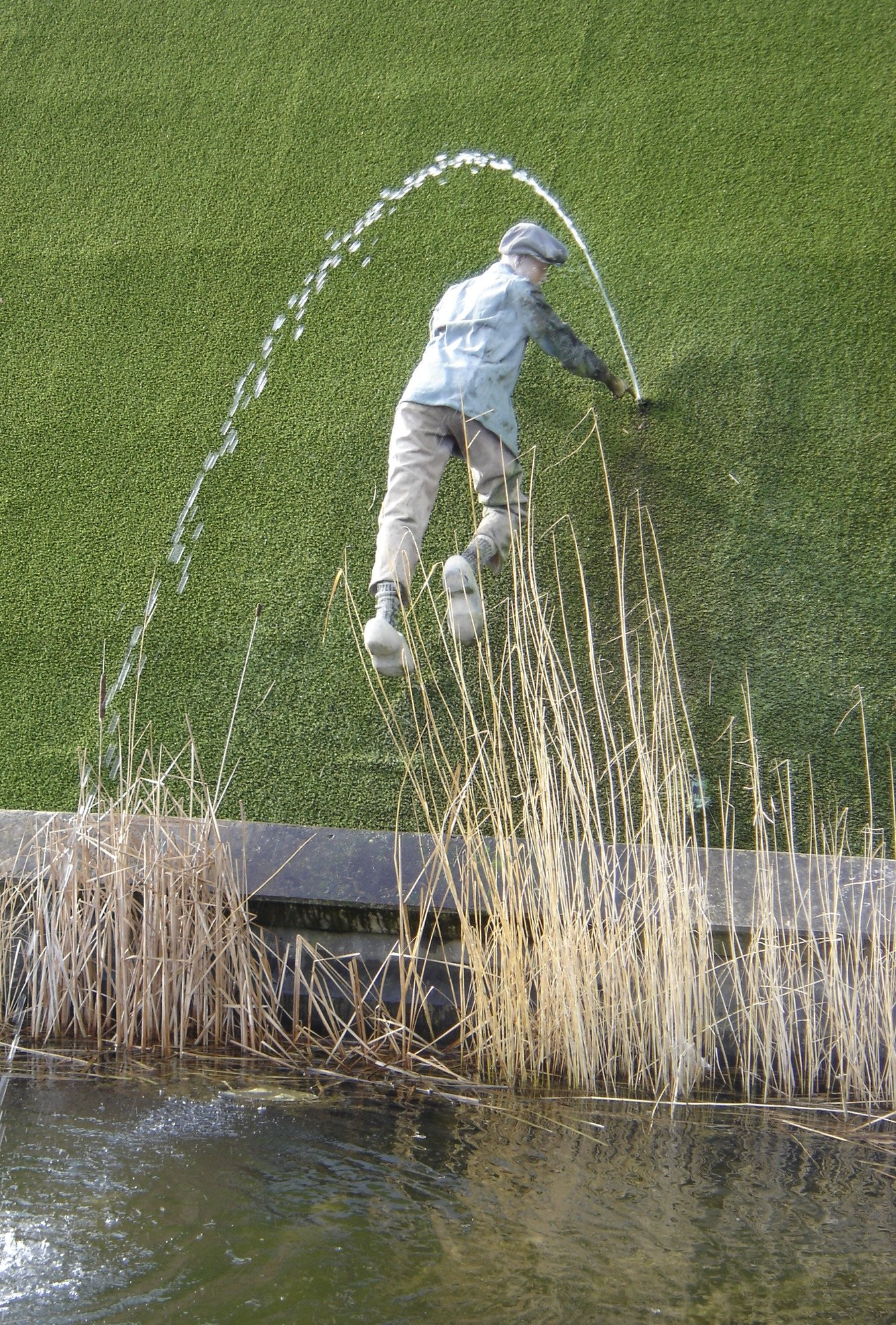
Tourism statue in Madurodam, Netherlands, of the nameless boy plugging a dike

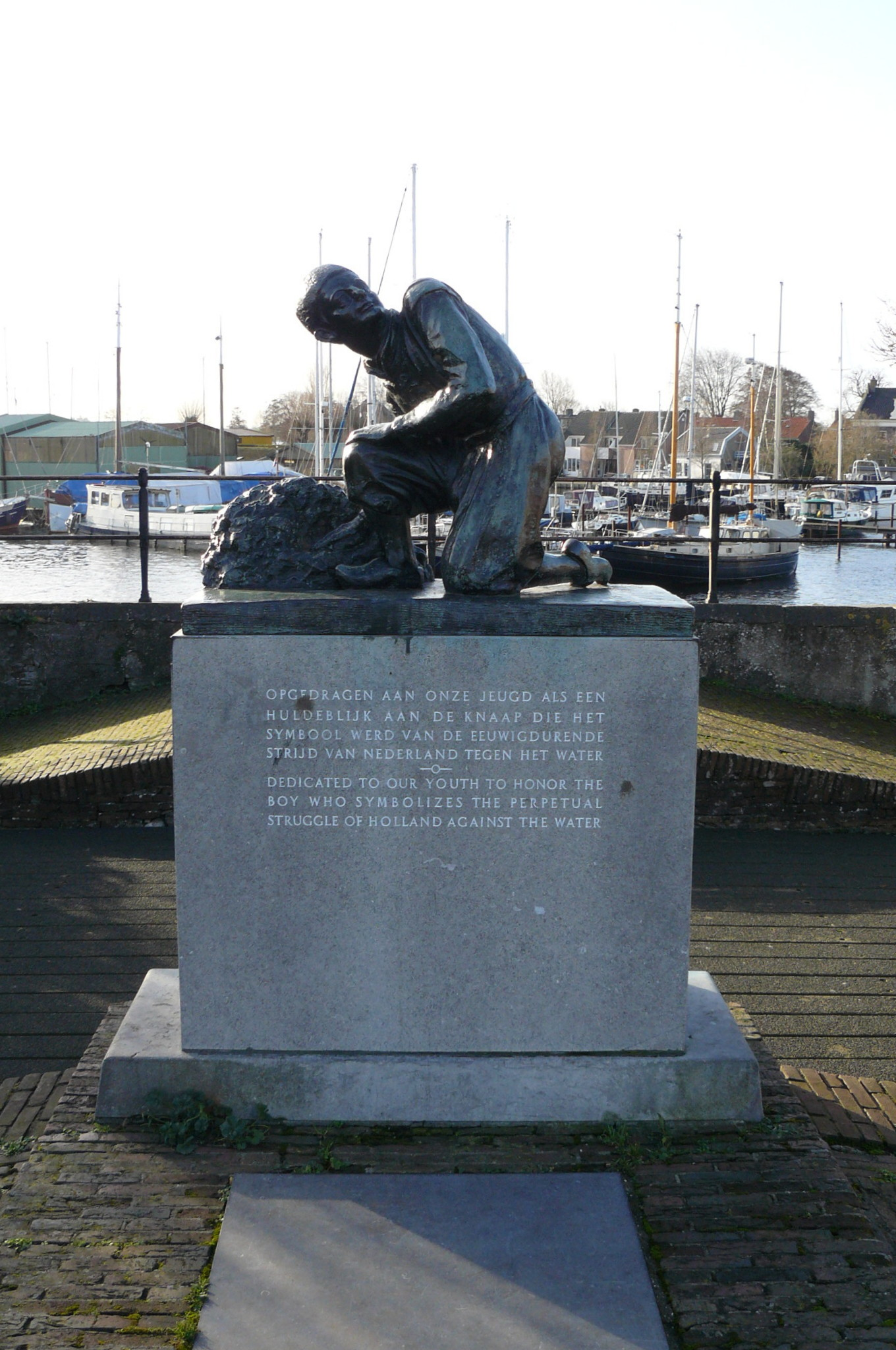
Tourism monument in Spaarndam, created in 1950, which reads: "Dedicated to our youth to honor the boy who symbolizes the perpetual struggle of Holland against the water"

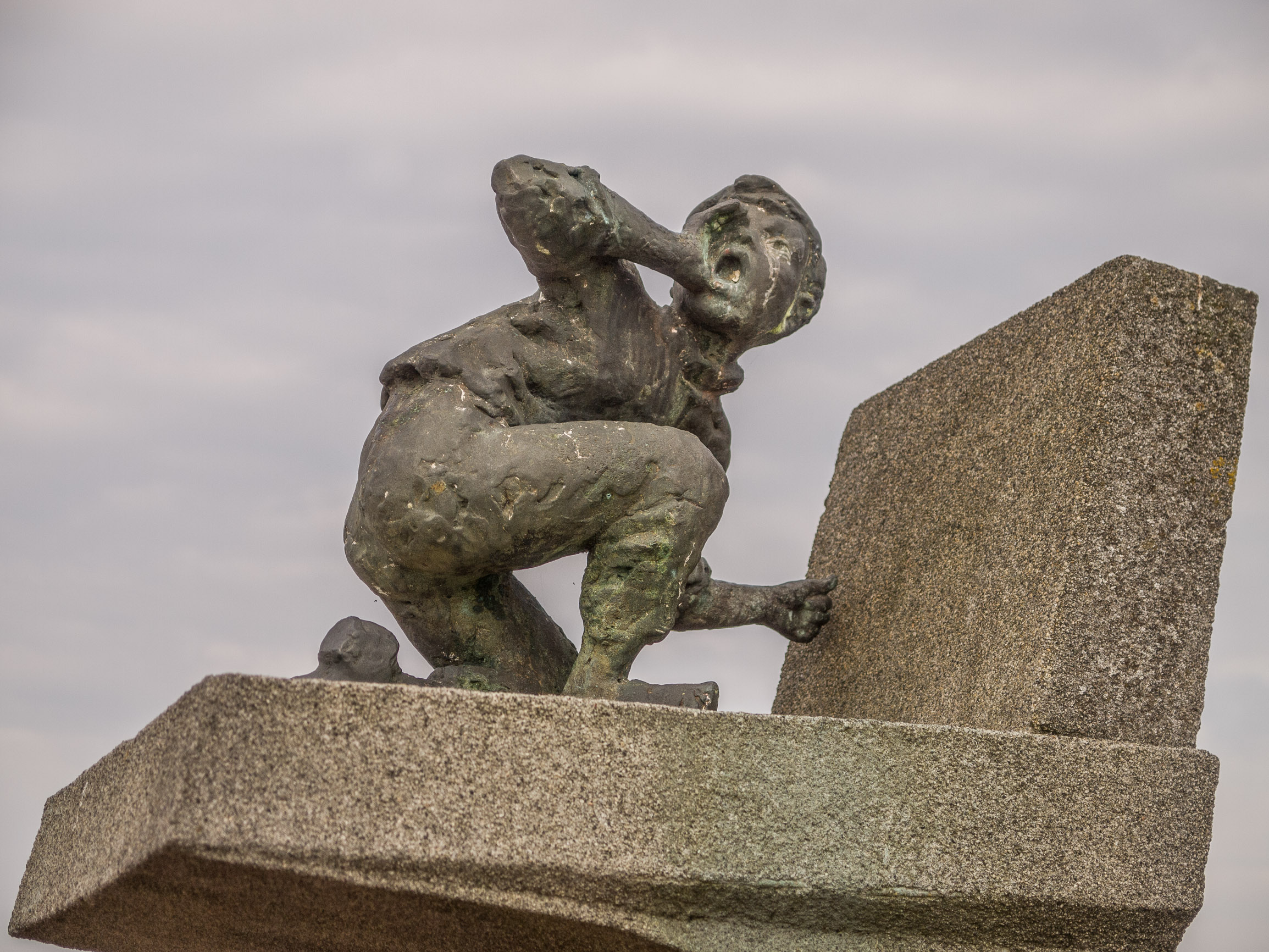
Statue in Harlingen, originally created in 1960 for a Bert Haanstra film, then donated to Harlingen

== See also ==
- 1865 in literature
- Aruni, a similar story from Indian mythology
- A Day on Skates: The Story of a Dutch Picnic, a children's novel
