= Eugénie Foa =

French writer

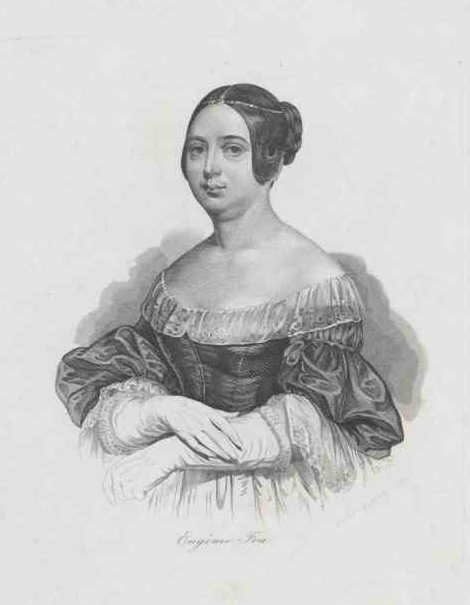
Eugénie Foa

Eugénie Foa (Bordeaux, 1796 - Paris, 1852) was a French writer, at times using the nom de plume "Maria Fitzclarence."

Eugénie Foa (born Esther-Eugénie Rodrigues-Henriques) was by descent a Sephardi Jew of Portuguese-Jewish descent, her mother being a member of the Gradis family, and both parents being members of the Bordeaux Jewish community. On the death of her father in 1826, the family moved to Paris. Eugenie married young, but after leaving her husband Joseph Foa shortly after their wedding, she began to support herself by writing.

Her sister, Leonie, was the wife of composer Fromental Halévy, and she is a cousin of Olinde Rodrigues.

== Books ==
- Le kidouschim (The Kiddushim) (1830)
- La Juive: histoire des temps de la régence (two volumes, 1835)
- Les Mémoirés d'un polichinelle (1839)
- Le petit Robinson de Paris (1840)
- Le vieux Paris (1840)

== See also ==
- Hans Brinker, or the Silver Skates#Origin of the story of the boy and the dike—The origin of the story about a Dutch boy who saves his country by putting his finger in a leaking dike has been attributed to Eugenie Foa's "Le Petit Éclusier" published in 1848.
