= Stump Lake National Wildlife Refuge =

Protected area in North Dakota, United States

Coordinates: 47°54′38″N 98°27′02″W

Stump Lake National Wildlife Refuge is a National Wildlife Refuge in Nelson County, North Dakota. It is managed under Devils Lake Wetland Management District.
