= Mape =

Mape may refer to:

== Things ==
- Mape, a toe loop jump in figure skating, after Bruce Mapes
- Mape, a novel by André Maurois
- MAPE, the Minnesota Association of Professional Employees.

== Places ==
- Mape, Zumalai, a suco in Zumalai administrative post, Cova Lima Municipality, Timor-Leste
- Lake Mape a lake and national park in Sierra Leone

== Statistics ==
- MAPE, mean absolute percentage error

== Computing ==
- Monitor, Analyse, Plan, Execute, an architectural building block in autonomic computing

== See also ==
- Mapes (disambiguation)
