= J. A. Mapes =

American politician (1861–1942)

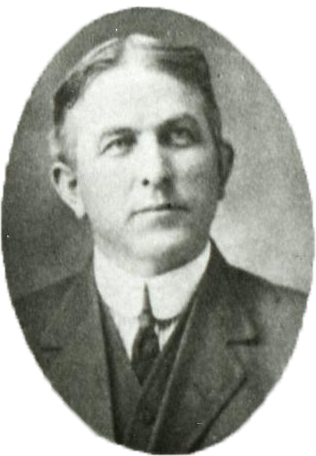
- Mapes in 1913

Member of the Washington House of Representatives for the 29th district
- In office 1913–1915

Personal details
- Born: April 23, 1861 New York, United States
- Died: January 11, 1942 (aged 80) Bellingham, Washington, United States
- Party: Republican

Josiah Alvin Mapes (April 23, 1861 – January 11, 1942) was an American politician in the state of Washington. He served in the Washington House of Representatives.
