= Kloten, North Dakota =

Kloten
- Location within North Dakota
- Coordinates: 47°42′58″N 98°04′31″W
- Country: United States
- State: North Dakota
- County: Nelson County
- Elevation: 1,519 ft (463 m)

Kloten is an unincorporated community in Nelson County, North Dakota, United States.

== Education ==
Kloten is served by Dakota Prairie School District.
