= Nelson County, North Dakota =

County in North Dakota, United States

- County
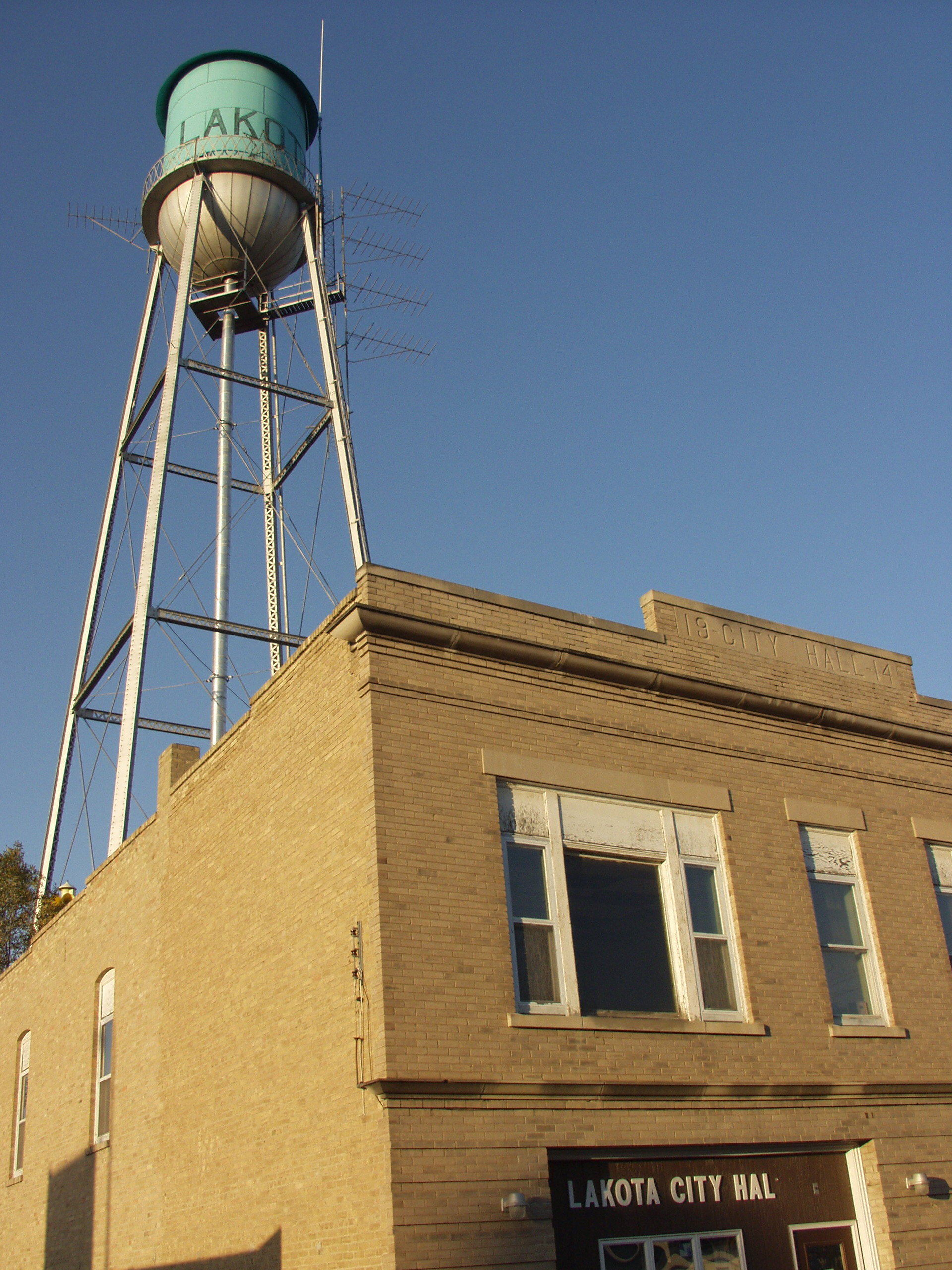
- Water Tower behind Lakota City Hall

- Location within the U.S. state of North Dakota
- Coordinates: 47.918667°N 98.204428°W
- Country: United States
- State: North Dakota
- Founded: March 2, 1883 (created); June 9, 1883 (organized)
- Seat: Lakota
- Largest city: Lakota

Area
  - Total: 1,008.871 sq mi (2,612.96 km^{2})
  - Land: 981.815 sq mi (2,542.89 km^{2})
  - Water: 27.056 sq mi (70.07 km^{2}) 2.68%

Population (2020)
  - Total: 3,015
  - Estimate (2025): 2,963 ▼
  - Density: 3.064/sq mi (1.183/km^{2})
- Time zone: UTC−6 (Central)
  - Summer (DST): UTC−5 (CDT)
- Area code: 701
- Congressional district: At-large
- Website: nelsonco.org

Nelson County is a county in the U.S. state of North Dakota. As of the 2020 census, the population was 3,015, and was estimated to be 2,963 in 2025. The county seat and largest city is Lakota.

== History ==
The Dakota Territory legislature created Nelson County on March 2, 1883, with areas annexed from Foster, Grand Forks and Ramsey counties, and with some previously unorganized area. It was not organized at that time, but was attached to Grand Forks County for administrative and judicial purposes. Its proposed boundary was enlarged on March 9, 1883, and on June 9, 1883, the county organization was effected and the administrative attachment to Grand Forks County was terminated.

== Geography ==
The county terrain consists of rolling hills dotted with lakes and ponds. The area is largely devoted to agriculture. The terrain slopes to the south and east, with its highest point near the midpoint of its north boundary line, at 1,545 ft (471 m) ASL.

According to the United States Census Bureau, the county has a total area of 1,008.871 square miles (2,612.96 km^{2}), of which 981.815 square miles (2,542.89 km^{2}) is land and 27.056 square miles (70.07 km^{2}) (2.68%) is water. It is the 41st largest county in North Dakota by total area.

=== Major highways ===
- U.S. Highway 2
- North Dakota Highway 1
- North Dakota Highway 15
- North Dakota Highway 32
- North Dakota Highway 35

=== Adjacent counties ===
- Walsh County - northeast
- Grand Forks County - east
- Steele County - southeast
- Griggs County - south
- Eddy County - southwest
- Benson County - west
- Ramsey County - northwest

=== National protected areas ===
- Johnson Lake National Wildlife Refuge (part)
- Lambs Lake National Wildlife Refuge
- Rose Lake National Wildlife Refuge
- Stump Lake National Wildlife Refuge

=== Lakes ===
- Bitter Lake
- Church Lake
- Hillesland Lake
- Johnson Lake
- Lake Laretta
- Mannie Lake
- Omild Slough
- Ottofy Lake
- Rose Lake
- Rugh Lake
- Stump Lake
- Swan Lake

== Demographics ==
Historical population
Census	Pop.	Note	%±
1890	4,293		—
1900	7,316		70.4%
1910	10,140		38.6%
1920	10,362		2.2%
1930	10,203		−1.5%
1940	9,129		−10.5%
1950	8,090		−11.4%
1960	7,034		−13.1%
1970	5,776		−17.9%
1980	5,233		−9.4%
1990	4,410		−15.7%
2000	3,715		−15.8%
2010	3,126		−15.9%
2020	3,015		−3.6%
2025 (est.)	2,963	▼	−1.7%
U.S. Decennial Census; 1790–1960 1900–1990; 1990–2000 2010–2020

As of the fourth quarter of 2024, the median home value in Nelson County was $121,319.

As of the 2023 American Community Survey, there are 1,295 estimated households in Nelson County with an average of 2.25 persons per household. The county has a median household income of $68,051. Approximately 9.8% of the county's population lives at or below the poverty line. Nelson County has an estimated 55.7% employment rate, with 28.2% of the population holding a bachelor's degree or higher and 93.3% holding a high school diploma.

The top five reported ancestries (people were allowed to report up to two ancestries, thus the figures will generally add to more than 100%) were English (94.5%), Spanish (1.1%), Indo-European (2.9%), Asian and Pacific Islander (0.8%), and Other (0.6%).

The median age in the county was 50.4 years.

Nelson County, North Dakota – racial and ethnic composition
Note: the US Census treats Hispanic/Latino as an ethnic category. This table excludes Latinos from the racial categories and assigns them to a separate category. Hispanics/Latinos may be of any race.

Race / ethnicity (NH = non-Hispanic)	Pop. 1980	Pop. 1990	Pop. 2000	Pop. 2010	Pop. 2020
White alone (NH)	5,210 (99.56%)	4,391 (99.57%)	3,661 (98.55%)	3,018 (96.55%)	2,844 (94.33%)
Black or African American alone (NH)	1 (0.02%)	2 (0.05%)	3 (0.08%)	8 (0.26%)	6 (0.20%)
Native American or Alaska Native alone (NH)	8 (0.15%)	6 (0.14%)	13 (0.35%)	28 (0.90%)	16 (0.53%)
Asian alone (NH)	2 (0.04%)	3 (0.07%)	11 (0.30%)	2 (0.06%)	9 (0.30%)
Pacific Islander alone (NH)	—	—	0 (0.00%)	1 (0.03%)	1 (0.03%)
Other race alone (NH)	2 (0.04%)	0 (0.00%)	0 (0.00%)	0 (0.00%)	5 (0.17%)
Mixed race or multiracial (NH)	—	—	21 (0.57%)	36 (1.15%)	65 (2.16%)
Hispanic or Latino (any race)	10 (0.19%)	8 (0.18%)	6 (0.16%)	33 (1.06%)	69 (2.29%)
Total	5,233 (100.00%)	4,410 (100.00%)	3,715 (100.00%)	3,126 (100.00%)	3,015 (100.00%)

=== 2024 estimate ===
As of the 2024 estimate, there were 3,007 people and 1,295 households residing in the county. There were 1,781 housing units at an average density of 1.81 per square mile (0.7/km^{2}). The racial makeup of the county was 93.1% White (90.8% NH White), 0.9% African American, 2.6% Native American, 1.4% Asian, 0.1% Pacific Islander, _% from some other races and 1.9% from two or more races. Hispanic or Latino people of any race were 3.2% of the population.

=== 2020 census ===
As of the 2020 census, the county had a population of 3,015, 1,386 households, and 829 families residing in the county. The population density was 3.07 inhabitants per square mile (1.2/km^{2}). There were 1,791 housing units at an average density of 1.82 per square mile (0.7/km^{2}), of which 22.6% were vacant. Among occupied housing units, 80.8% were owner-occupied and 19.2% were renter-occupied; the homeowner vacancy rate was 1.5% and the rental vacancy rate was 23.9%.

Of the residents, 18.0% were under the age of 18 and 31.5% were 65 years of age or older; the median age was 53.8 years. For every 100 females there were 103.6 males, and for every 100 females age 18 and over there were 103.7 males.

There were 1,386 households in the county, of which 21.4% had children under the age of 18 living with them and 21.7% had a female householder with no spouse or partner present. About 36.4% of all households were made up of individuals and 20.4% had someone living alone who was 65 years of age or older.

The racial makeup of the county was 95.0% White, 0.2% Black or African American, 0.9% American Indian and Alaska Native, 0.3% Asian, 0.8% from some other race, and 2.9% from two or more races. Hispanic or Latino residents of any race comprised 2.3% of the population.

=== 2010 census ===
As of the 2010 census, there were 3,126 people, 1,474 households, and 905 families residing in the county. The population density was 3.18 inhabitants per square mile (1.2/km^{2}). There were 1,927 housing units at an average density of 1.96 per square mile (0.8/km^{2}). The racial makeup of the county was 97.15% White, 0.26% African American, 0.96% Native American, 0.10% Asian, 0.03% Pacific Islander, 0.03% from some other races and 1.47% from two or more races. Hispanic or Latino people of any race were 1.06% of the population.

In terms of ancestry, 52.3% were Norwegian, 34.1% were German, 8.2% were Irish, and 3.9% were American.

There were 1,474 households, 21.4% had children under the age of 18 living with them, 52.1% were married couples living together, 5.4% had a female householder with no husband present, 38.6% were non-families, and 36.0% of all households were made up of individuals. The average household size was 2.07 and the average family size was 2.66. The median age was 51.5 years.

The median income for a household in the county was $39,071 and the median income for a family was $51,731. Males had a median income of $33,629 versus $28,672 for females. The per capita income for the county was $22,838. About 4.0% of families and 9.9% of the population were below the poverty line, including 14.0% of those under age 18 and 13.6% of those age 65 or over.

== Communities ==
=== Cities ===
- Aneta
- Lakota (county seat)
- McVille
- Michigan City
- Pekin
- Petersburg
- Tolna

=== Census-designated place ===
- Dahlen

=== Unincorporated communities ===
- Kloten
- Mapes
- Pelto
- Whitman

=== Townships ===
- Adler
- Bergen
- Central
- Clara
- Dahlen
- Dayton
- Dodds
- Enterprise
- Field
- Forde
- Hamlin
- Illinois
- Lakota
- Lee
- Leval
- Melvin
- Michigan
- Nash
- Nesheim
- Ora
- Osago
- Petersburg
- Rubin
- Rugh
- Sarnia
- Wamduska
- Williams

Township Numbers and Range Numbers
	Range 61	Range 60	Range 59	Range 58	Range 57
Township 154		Clara	Enterprise	Sarnia	Dahlen
Township 153		Lakota	Rubin	Michigan	Nash
Township 152	Illinois	Dodds	Williams	Michigan	Petersburg
Township 151	Leval	Wamduska	Central	Melvin	Adler
Township 150	Dayton	Osago	Hamlin	Field	Rugh
Township 149	Forde	Bergen	Nesheim	Lee	Ora

== Politics ==
Nelson County voters have slightly favored Republicans for the past several decades. Since 1964 the county selected the Republican Party candidate in 64% of national elections.

United States presidential election results for Nelson County, North Dakota
Year	Republican		Democratic		Third party(ies)	
Year	No.	%	No.	%	No.	%
1900	994	61.24%	576	35.49%	53	3.27%
1904	1,284	74.61%	340	19.76%	97	5.64%
1908	1,225	63.80%	616	32.08%	79	4.11%
1912	448	26.34%	526	30.92%	727	42.74%
1916	1,013	50.98%	861	43.33%	113	5.69%
1920	3,127	84.49%	501	13.54%	73	1.97%
1924	1,697	49.20%	175	5.07%	1,577	45.72%
1928	2,364	60.18%	1,542	39.26%	22	0.56%
1932	956	23.14%	3,176	76.86%	0	0.00%
1936	1,002	22.31%	2,954	65.78%	535	11.91%
1940	1,859	43.07%	2,435	56.42%	22	0.51%
1944	1,506	43.77%	1,925	55.94%	10	0.29%
1948	1,672	47.26%	1,629	46.04%	237	6.70%
1952	2,443	62.96%	1,418	36.55%	19	0.49%
1956	1,821	50.35%	1,794	49.60%	2	0.06%
1960	1,934	52.00%	1,783	47.94%	2	0.05%
1964	1,101	33.50%	2,186	66.50%	0	0.00%
1968	1,526	48.26%	1,477	46.71%	159	5.03%
1972	1,625	53.67%	1,358	44.85%	45	1.49%
1976	1,336	44.31%	1,610	53.40%	69	2.29%
1980	1,611	62.08%	726	27.98%	258	9.94%
1984	1,445	57.50%	1,026	40.83%	42	1.67%
1988	1,078	48.06%	1,151	51.32%	14	0.62%
1992	864	39.17%	841	38.12%	501	22.71%
1996	745	41.41%	827	45.97%	227	12.62%
2000	1,031	56.03%	687	37.34%	122	6.63%
2004	1,107	57.60%	778	40.48%	37	1.93%
2008	800	45.66%	907	51.77%	45	2.57%
2012	865	51.55%	767	45.71%	46	2.74%
2016	1,025	59.70%	536	31.22%	156	9.09%
2020	1,141	64.21%	586	32.98%	50	2.81%
2024	1,141	64.79%	580	32.94%	40	2.27%

== Education ==
School districts include:

- Dakota Prairie Public School District 1
- Midkota Public School District 7
- Fordville-Lankin Public School District 5
- Lakota Public School District 66
- Larimore Public School District 44
- Northwood Public School District 129

== See also ==
- National Register of Historic Places listings in Nelson County, North Dakota
