= James Mapes =

Chemist (1806–1866)

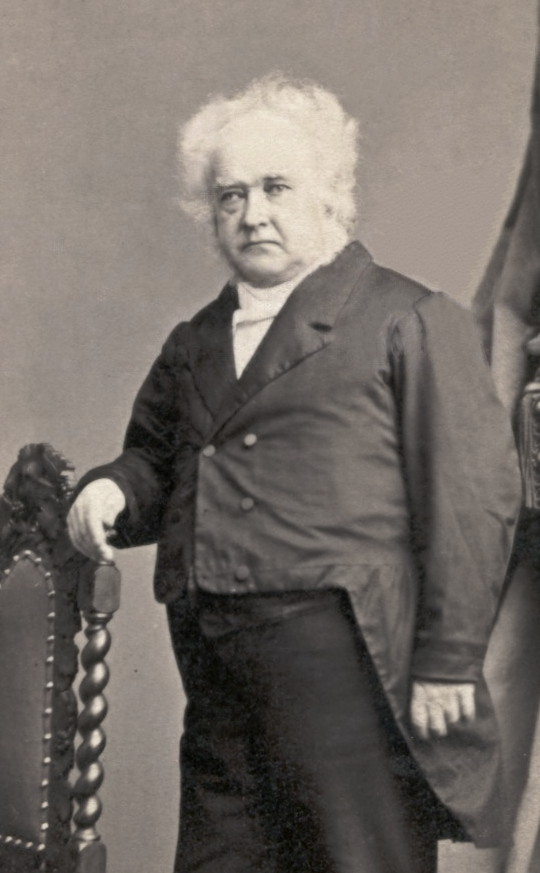
- Born: May 29, 1806; New York City, US
- Died: January 10, 1866 (aged 59); New York City, US
- Scientific career
- Fields: Agriculture, chemistry

James Jay Mapes (May 29, 1806 – January 10, 1866) was an American chemist, inventor, and educator, mostly known for his achievements in scientific agriculture.

== Biography ==
Mapes was born in New York on May 29, 1806. His father, Jonas Mapes, was a major-general in command of the New York state forces in and around New York in the year 1812. Nearly all his ancestors on the father's side were farmers on Long Island, back to 1640, when Thomas Mapes came from England and settled there. In his early years, James showed passion for chemistry, invention and military matters. From the age of 11, for a few years, he studied at the classical school of Timothy Clowes at Hempstead, Long Island, while living with renowned English reformer William Cobbett. When only seventeen years of age he delivered a full course of lectures in New York on "Military Tactics".

Later Mapes became known as an analytical chemist, and his analyses of beer and wines, made at requests of the senate of New York and the temperance societies, were regarded as standard experiments. He was one of the first manufacturer of magnesium sulfate from magnesium hydrobisilicate and the author of many improvements in tempering steel, distilling, dyeing, and other areas. In 1832, he invented a new system of sugar refining and later an apparatus for manufacturing sugar from the cane. He was the inventor of processes for tanning leather and the manufacture of sugar from West India molasses. He also designed a centrifugal machine for separating molasses from sugar.

Soon after the organization of the National Academy of Design in New York, he was appointed professor of chemistry and natural philosophy there. Mapes was actively connected to the American Institute for at least 25 years, as professor of chemistry and natural philosophy and later as vice-president. He was one of the founders of the National Agricultural Society and in 1844, was elected president of the Mechanics' Institute of New York. Mapes was made a permanent member of the New York Lyceum of Natural History and National Institute in Washington, and was an honorary member of the Scientific Institute of Brussels, Royal Society of Saint Petersburg, Geographical Society of Paris, Artists' Fund Society of Philadelphia, and several horticultural and agricultural societies of Europe and America.

In 1847, Mapes moved to New Jersey and bought a farm near Irvington. There, he devoted himself to scientific agriculture, particularly fertilizers (the "Mapes Fertilizer", patented in 1859), drainage, crop rotation and seeding. He was active in popularizing his agricultural methods via public exhibitions at his farm. In Newark, New Jersey, Mapes organized the Franklin Institute and was its first lecturer. In July 1851, he became associate editor of the Journal of Agriculture, a semimonthly edition started in Boston. As a writer he was distinguished for terseness and simplicity of style.

Mapes was one of the earliest American converts to spiritualism. His interest began as an attempt to disprove the "imbecility" of the concept, but he became convinced that "spirits can and do communicate with mortals, and in all cases evince a desire to elevate and advance those they commune with."

== Family ==
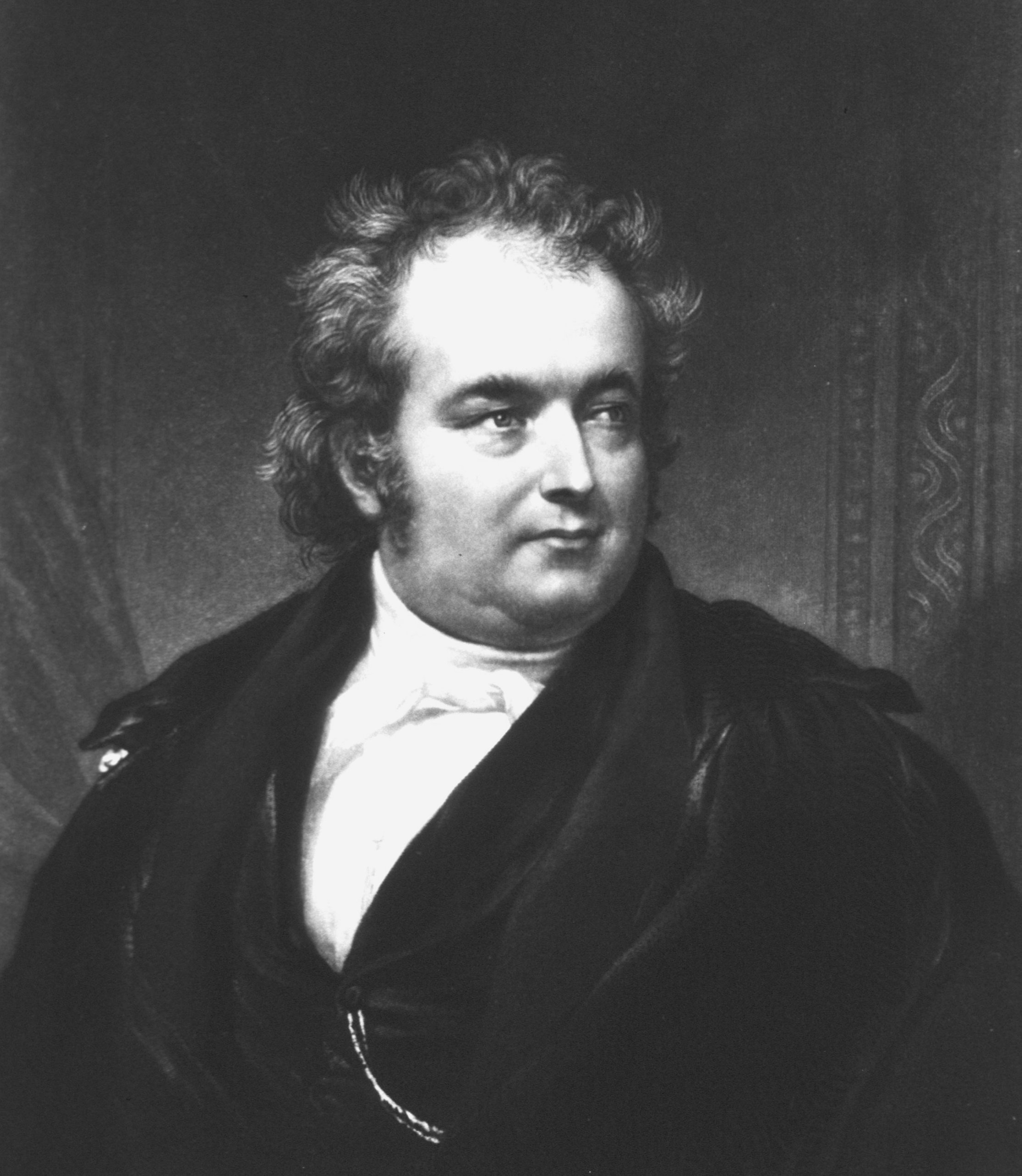
Young James Mapes

At the age of twenty-one Mapes married a Long Island lady, Sophia Furman, two years his junior, daughter of the Judge Garret Furman, of Maspeth, Long Island. They had at least four children:

- Mary Mapes Dodge, born Mary Elizabeth Mapes (January 26, 1831 – August 21, 1905), an American children's writer and editor
- Sophy Mapes Tolles, an artist
- Catherine T. Bunnell
- Charles Victor Mapes (July 4, 1836 – January 23, 1916), an agriculture scientist and engineer, the originator of the "Mapes Complete Manure", and a member of the New Jersey State Board of Agriculture and the American Chemical Society. For many years since 1877 he was vice-president and general manager of "The Mapes Formula and Peruvian Guano Company", a stock company established in New York in 1877.
