= George Maduro =

Dutch resistance member (1916–1945)

George Maduro RMWO
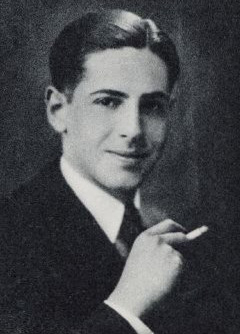
- Born: George John Lionel Maduro; 15 July 1916; Willemstad, Curaçao
- Died: 8 February 1945 (aged 28); Dachau, Germany
- Education: Leiden University
- Occupation: Military officer
- Awards: Knight 4th Class of the Military William Order (Netherlands)

George John Lionel Maduro RMWO (15 July 1916 – 8 February 1945) was a Dutch law student who served as an officer in the 1940 Battle of the Netherlands and distinguished himself in repelling the German attack on The Hague. He was posthumously awarded the medal of Knight 4th-class of the Military Order of William, the highest and oldest military decoration in the Kingdom of the Netherlands. His heroic acts are included in the Canon of the Netherlands.

The miniature city of Madurodam is named after him, as well as the Maduroplein area in Scheveningen, in The Hague.

== Biography ==
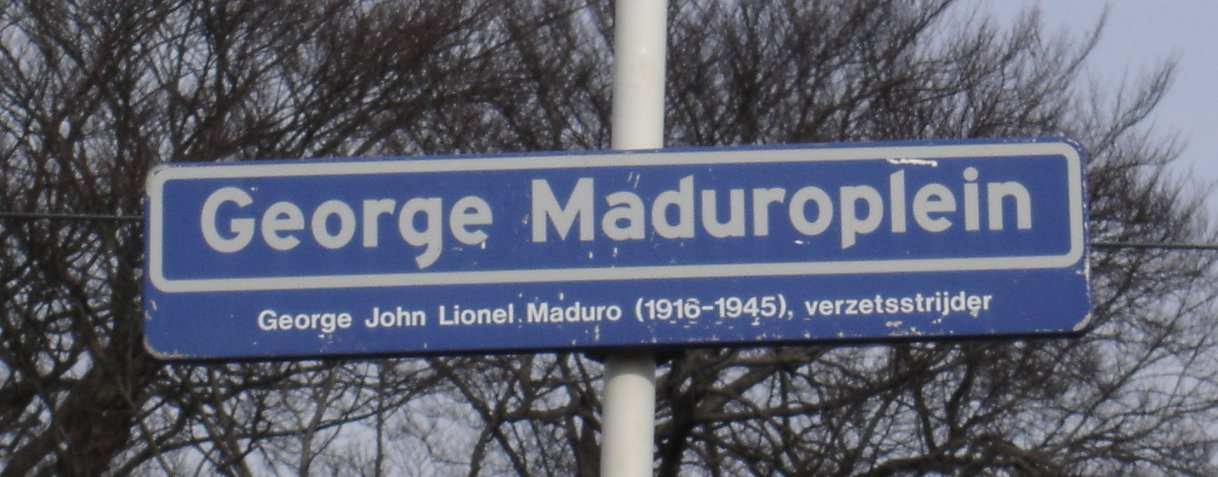
George Maduroplein street sign in Scheveningen

George John Lionel Maduro was born on 15 July 1916 in Willemstad in the Dutch colony Curaçao and Dependencies. He was the only son of Joshua and Rebecca Maduro, a couple of Sephardic Jewish descent.

Maduro was 23 and a law student at Leiden University when Germany invaded the Netherlands on 10 May 1940. By a royal order on 21 November 1939 Maduro had been previously appointed to second-lieutenant-reserve in the Dutch Cavalry.

In the Battle of the Netherlands he was quartered with the Dutch Hussars in The Hague as a reserve officer. Under his command German ground troops stationed in Rijswijk were defeated and parachutists were captured.

May 1946: —

Distinguished himself in battle on May 10, 1940 by superior acts of courage, ingenuity, and loyalty. As Commander of a platoon of young soldiers, he planned and prepared, with great skill and on his own initiative, the attack on the enemy-occupied villa 'Leeuwenburg' behind the Vliet in Rijswijk. With considerable courage, leading two groups of young soldiers, he crossed the bridge over the Vliet while under enemy machine-gun fire, personally led the attack on the fortified base (Villa 'Leeuwenburg'), and in the assault was the first to force his way in, breaking the resistance and taking the occupants prisoner.

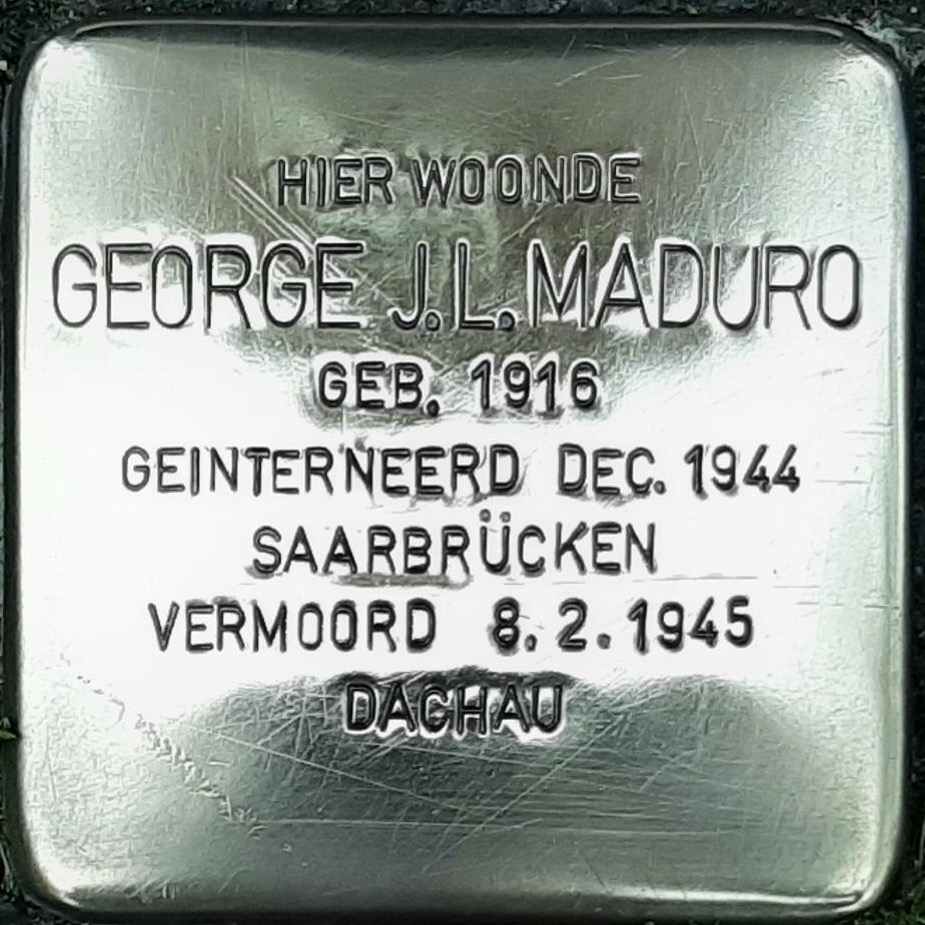
Stolperstein for George Maduro Scheveningen

On 15 May 1940, upon the capitulation of the Dutch military, Maduro was captured by German troops and jailed in the Oranjehotel in Scheveningen.

When he was released a half year later, the German occupation forces had required that all Jews wear the Star of David. Maduro refused to do so and joined the resistance movement. He became active in smuggling Allied pilots into the United Kingdom via Spain. After much success Maduro was eventually captured by Nazi forces and placed in jail again.

Months later, after a daring escape he rejoined the Dutch resistance but was ultimately betrayed by a Belgian collaborator and captured again, this time by the German Gestapo, who jailed him first at Saarbrücken. During an Allied bombing raid, Maduro's jail wing was directly hit, freeing him and several other prisoners from their cells. Instead of fleeing, Maduro rushed to the rescue of several injured prisoners that had been buried by rubble, likely saving their lives.

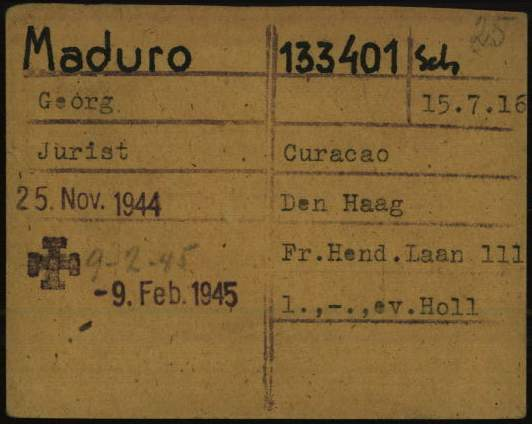
Registration card of George Maduro as a prisoner at Dachau Nazi Concentration Camp

Months later, he was transferred to Dachau concentration camp. In February 1945, barely three months prior to the liberation of the camp by American troops, Maduro died of typhus. It is presumed that he is buried in the cemetery of the camp.

== Legacy ==
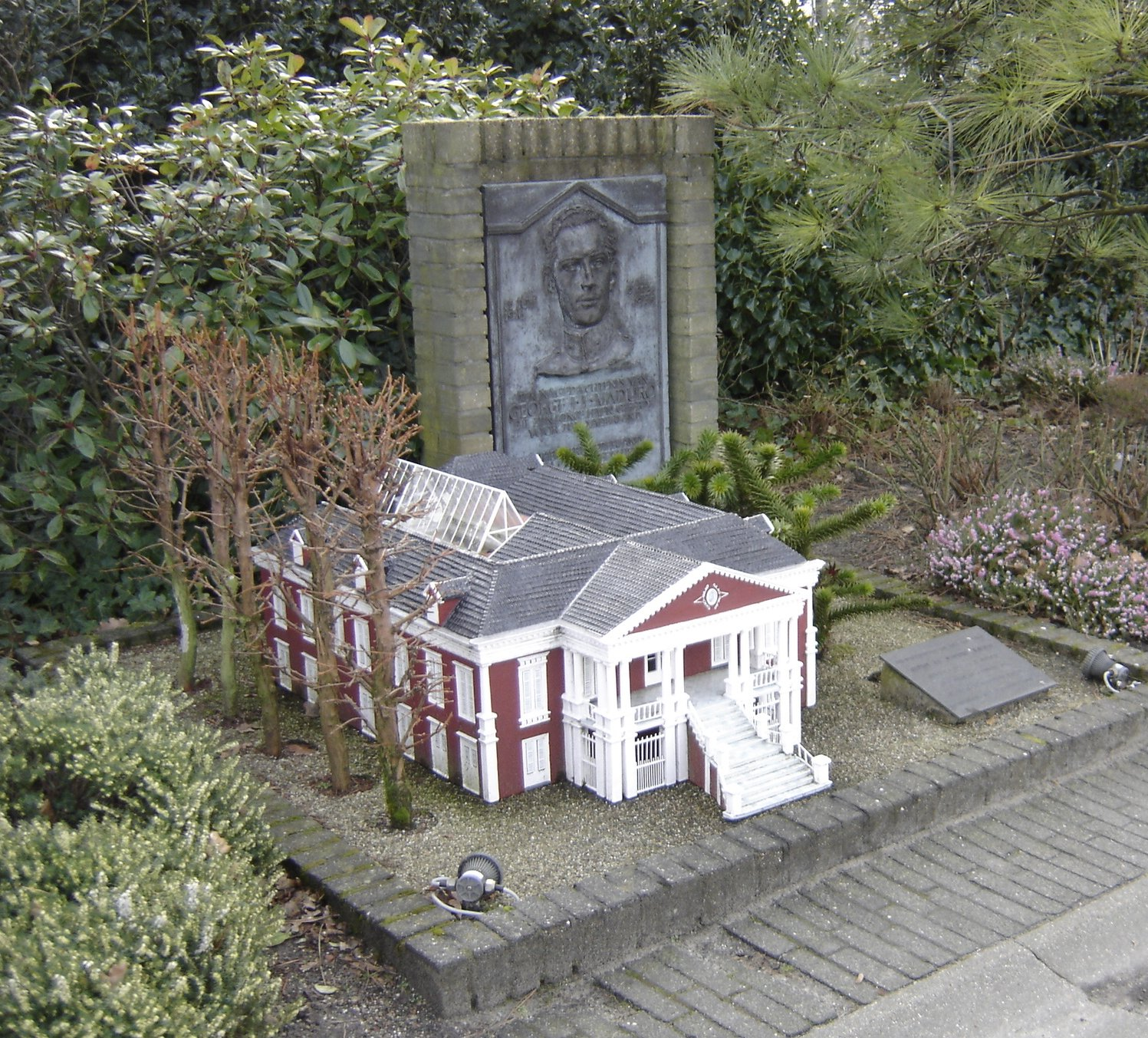
Model of the late 19th-century birthplace of George Maduro in Madurodam

He is the only Dutch person of Antillian descent to have been awarded the Knight 4th-class of the Military Order of William, which was awarded posthumously.

After World War II, Maduro's parents donated the initial capital necessary to build Madurodam, a miniature city that opened in 1952 and which they meant to serve as a memorial in honor of George, their only son. In 1993, a scale model of Maduro's birthplace in Curaçao was built in the park. The entirety of net proceeds from the park are donated to various charities throughout the Netherlands.

A documentary about Maduro's life was made in 2001 by Alfred Edelstein.

Belgian artist Franky Drappier adapted his life into a 2016 graphic novel.

On 1 September 2022 an opera about Maduro premiered in the Hague.

== Publication ==
- Kathleen Brandt-Carey: Knight without fear and beyond reproach. The life of George Maduro 1916-1945. Houten, Spectrum, 2016. ISBN 978-90-00-34962-3
