= Madurodam =

Miniature park in The Hague, the Netherlands

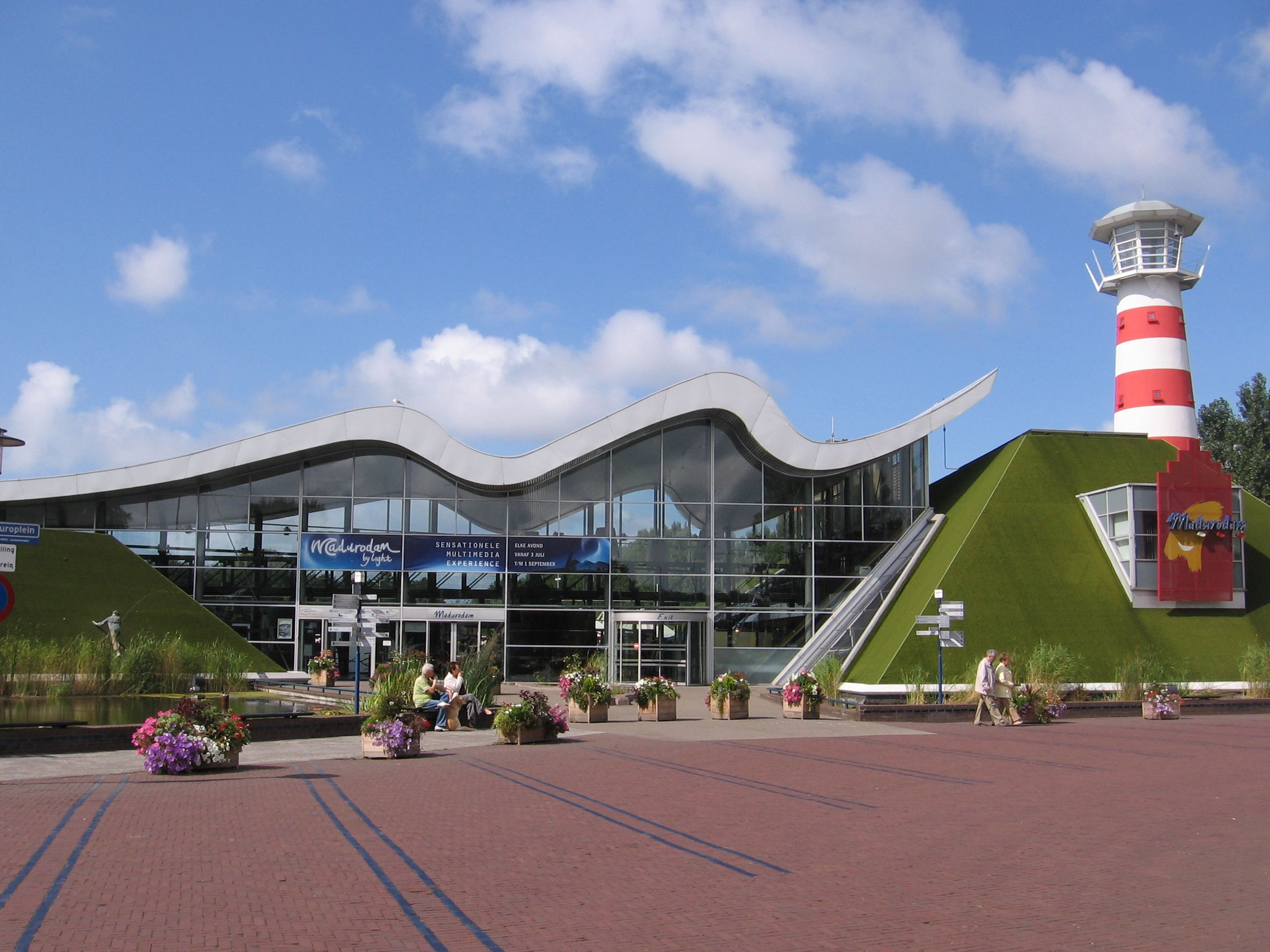
- Madurodam entrance in 2007
- Interactive map of Madurodam
- Location: George Maduroplein 1 The Hague, Netherlands
- Coordinates: 52.0995°N 4.2975°E
- Status: Operating
- Opened: 2 July 1952; 74 years ago
- Operating season: All year round
- Attendance: 655,000 (2014)
- Website: www.madurodam.nl

Madurodam (Dutch pronunciation: [maːˌdyːroːˈdɑm]) is a miniature park and tourist attraction in the Scheveningen district of The Hague in the Netherlands. It is home to a range of 1:25 scale model replicas of famous Dutch landmarks, historical cities and large developments. The park was opened in 1952 and has since been visited by tens of millions of visitors. The entirety of net proceeds from the park go towards various charities in the Netherlands.

== Name ==
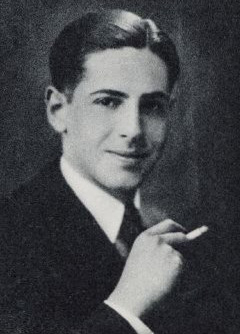
Madurodam is named after George Maduro (1916–45)

Madurodam was named after George Maduro, a Dutch law student from Curaçao who fought the Nazi occupation forces, first as a lieutenant in the army and later as a member of the Dutch resistance, and who died at Dachau concentration camp in 1945. In 1946, Maduro was posthumously awarded the Medal of Knight Fourth class of the Military Order of William, the highest and oldest military decoration in the Kingdom of the Netherlands, for the valor he had demonstrated in the Battle of the Netherlands against German troops.

== History ==
=== Idea for the park ===
Constructing Madurodam, Dutch newsreel from 1951

Bep Boon-van der Starp was a member of a foundation for the Dutch Students Sanatorium. In this sanatorium students with tuberculosis could obtain treatment, and could also study. Financial support was needed to pay for their convalescent care. Mrs Boon-van der Starp heard about Bekonscot, a miniature park in Beaconsfield, England. This park generated large profits, a large part of which was donated to a hospital in London each year.

After a meeting with Mrs Boon-van der Starp, George Maduro's parents donated the funds needed for the Madurodam project, as a memorial to their son. S.J. Bouma was appointed architect of Madurodam, and visited Bekonscot because Mrs Boon-van der Starp wanted the new park to be similar. After his visit he created a plan for Madurodam and came up with a theme: Het stadje met de glimlach ("The little city with the smile").

=== Mayor and city council ===
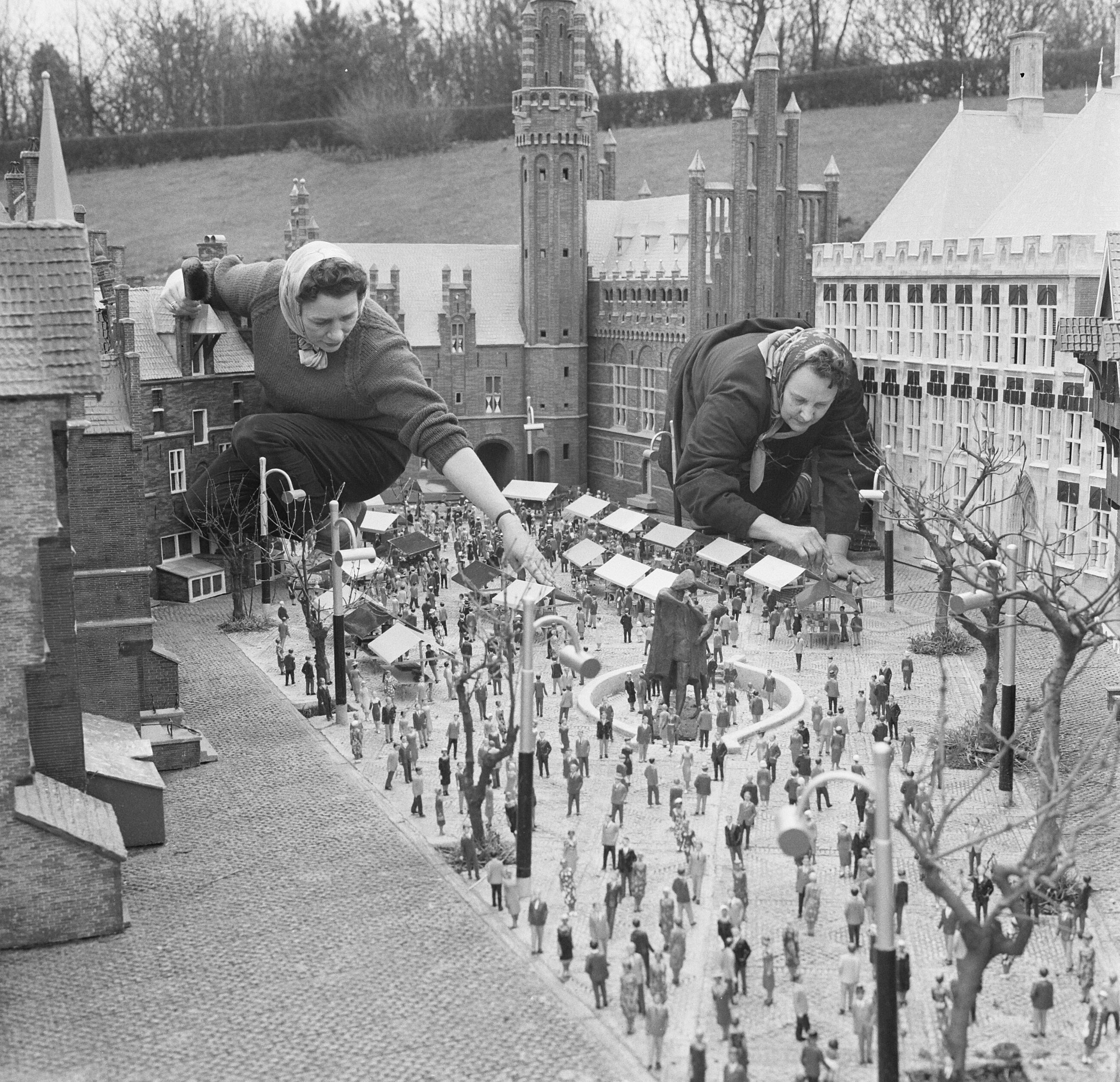
Madurodam in 1964

On 2 July 1952, the then teenage Princess Beatrix was appointed mayor of Madurodam, and was given a tour of her town. When Beatrix became Queen, she relinquished this title. After her resignation a new tradition arose: the city council would annually select a mayor from their midst. All members of the youth council are The Hague students. Every year schools from The Hague can nominate students to take part in the youth council.

The youth council members are also members of the disbursement committee at Madurodam. The disbursement committee manages charities – Madurodam has its own fund which provides financial support to institutions that organize activities for young people.

=== Renovations ===
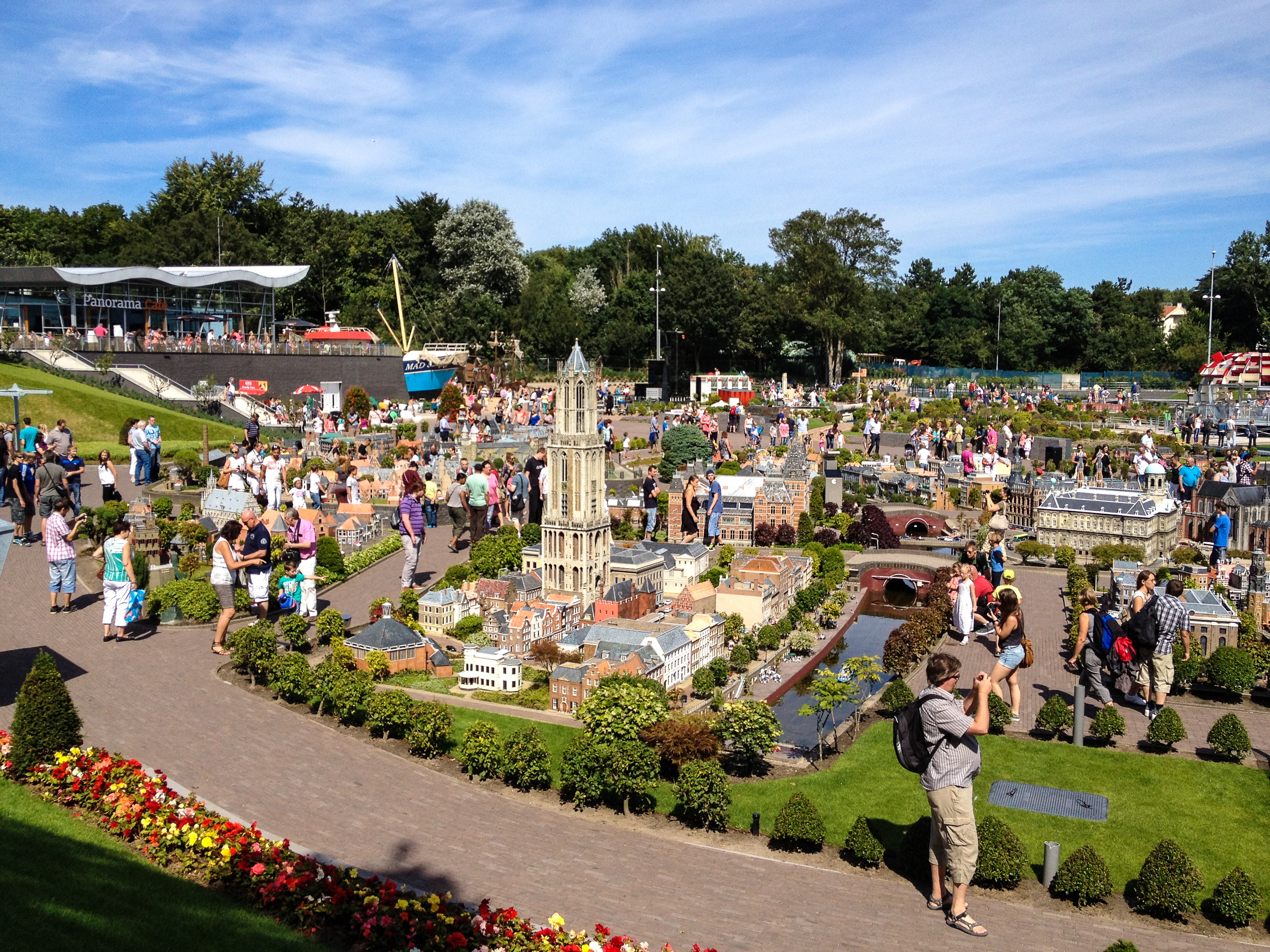
Madurodam in August 2012

In 2011, research showing declining public interest prompted the park management to invest in a large-scale renovation, at a cost of €8 million, in time for the park's 60th anniversary in 2012. For this purpose the park was closed to the public between November 2011 and April 2012.

The park is now divided into three themes: water, as a friend and an enemy; historical cities; and The Netherlands as an inspiration for the world. Each theme offers different activities – from light shows to mixing music. Small coin slots trigger bridges, factories or an oil tanker on fire. While aesthetic improvements have been made, the informative aspect has also been improved. Small television stands show brief video footage or in-depth information. Visitors receive chipped cards upon entry, which can be used to trigger these.

On 7 April 2012, Madurodam opened its doors to the public again. The official opening was on 21 April 2012 with then-Queen Beatrix.

== The park ==
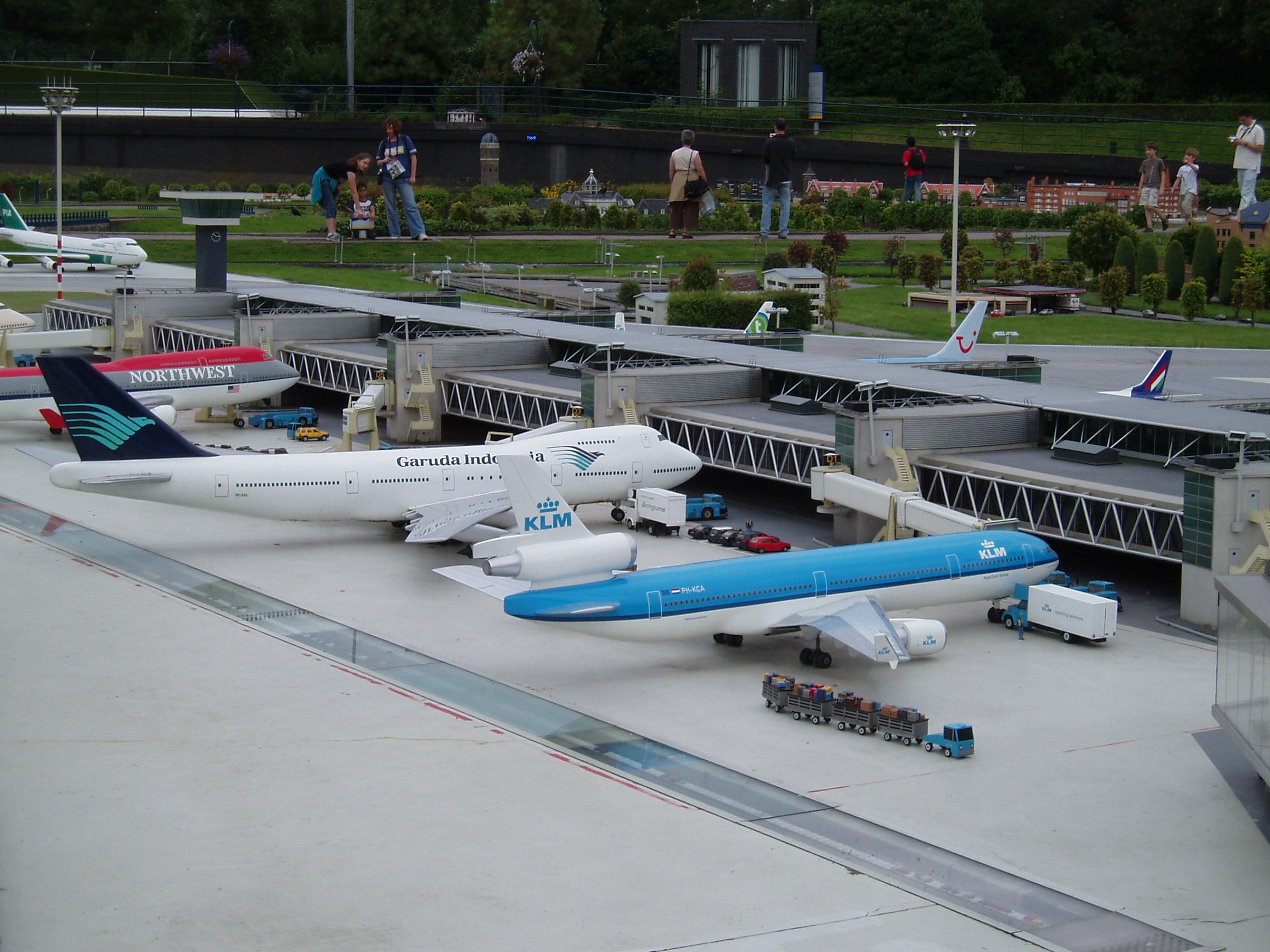
Miniature planes at the model of Schiphol airport in 2007

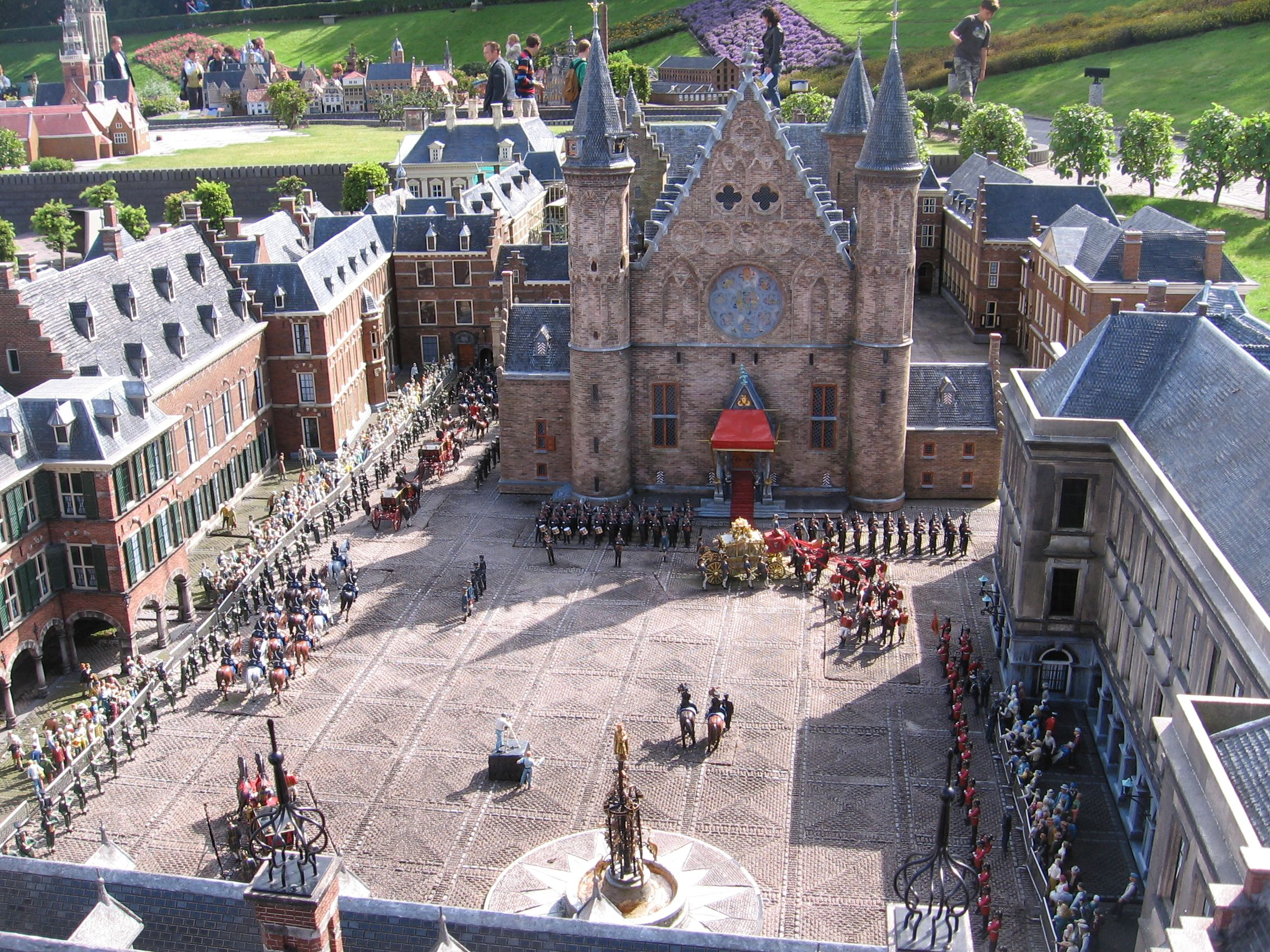
Model of the Binnenhof in The Hague on Prinsjesdag in 2007

=== Modelling ===
Every object in Madurodam has been built at a scale of 1:25. When the management decides that a specific miniature is to be made for Madurodam, the builders first research all aspects of the actual building. They research the shape, color and all other properties of that object, by analysing many pictures. After this they start making the models. A computer measures everything and sends all information to a machine that makes the physical model. The model goes to the painting room, where it gets the final look. In this painting room restorations also take place. Because most of the miniatures are outdoors, they need regular paint retouches.

=== Realism ===
Madurodam strives to show a realistic view of The Netherlands in a scaled-down environment. Everything, including flora and street decoration, is modeled to scale. Producing the scaled-down trees is time-consuming. Also, there are a lot of little people around the buildings. This shows the real life of the Dutch people. These "residents" also change with the weather. In the winter they wear jackets and warm clothes and in the summer they wear T-shirts. The "residents" of Madurodam have become more and more multicultural, and include some who appear to have come from other countries (immigrants), reflecting real life in The Netherlands.

=== Fantasitron ===
Fantasitron is a 3D selfie photo booth where patrons can have 3D models of themselves created by software from pictures taken in the photo booth. A third-party printing company such as Shapeways prints and ships manufactured models to patrons.

=== Landmarks ===
Although Madurodam is mainly a miniature city, a collection of Dutch buildings, structures, and notable features is also found amidst the landscapes.

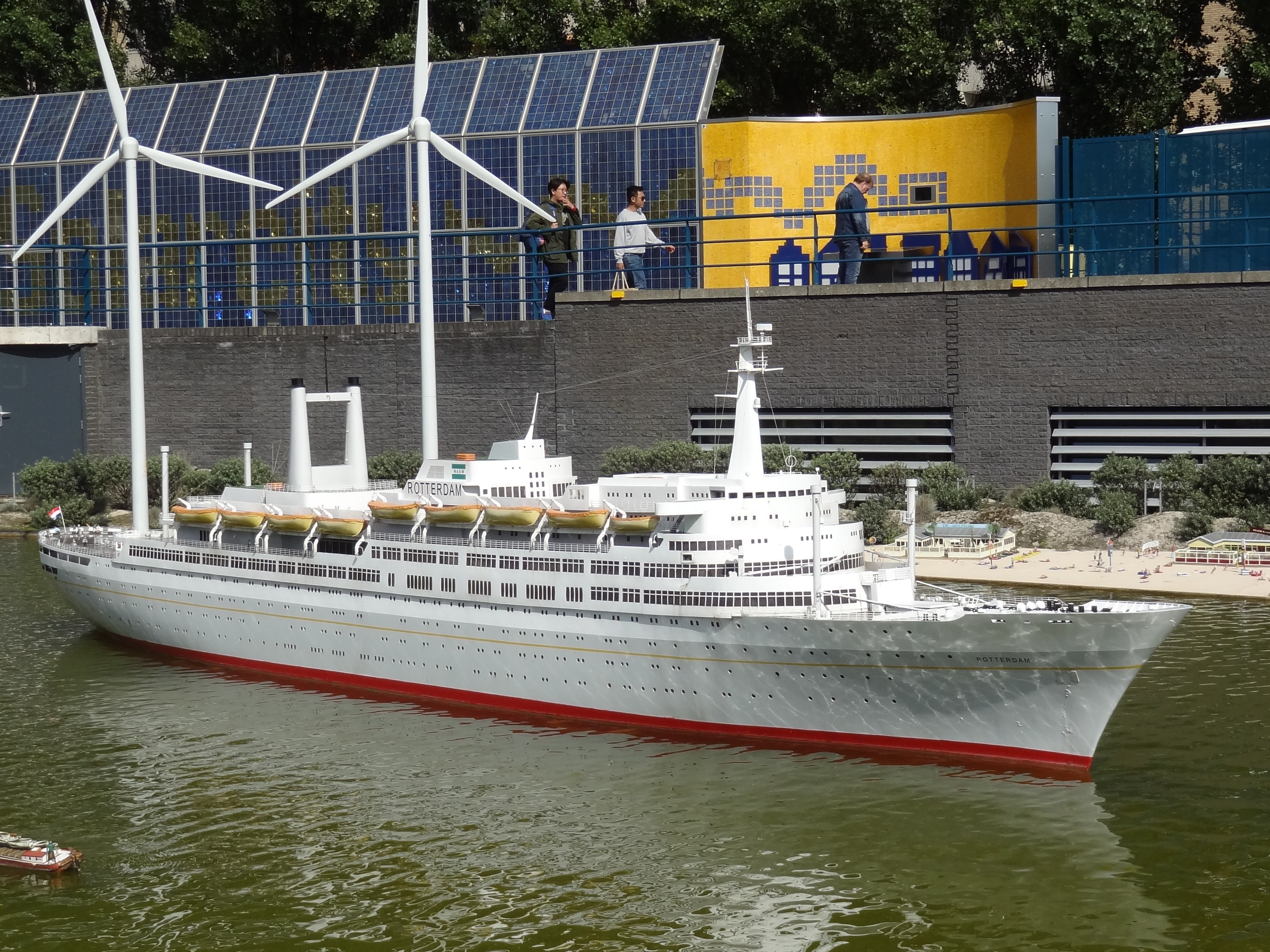
The model of SS Rotterdam. Launched in 1958, she is considered the last Dutch "ship of state".

They include:

- Rijksmuseum
- Binnenhof, location of the Dutch government
- Amsterdam Airport Schiphol, the Netherlands' main international airport
- Port of Rotterdam, the world's third-largest port
- Dom Tower of Utrecht
- Traditional Dutch canal houses
- Tulip fields
- Windmills
- Skyline of the city of Rotterdam, like the Erasmus bridge, Euromast, central train station, cube houses and Unilever HQ buildings.
- SS Rotterdam, ocean liner and former flagship of Holland-America Line. She has been a museum and hotel in Rotterdam since 2010.

=== The Dutch court ===
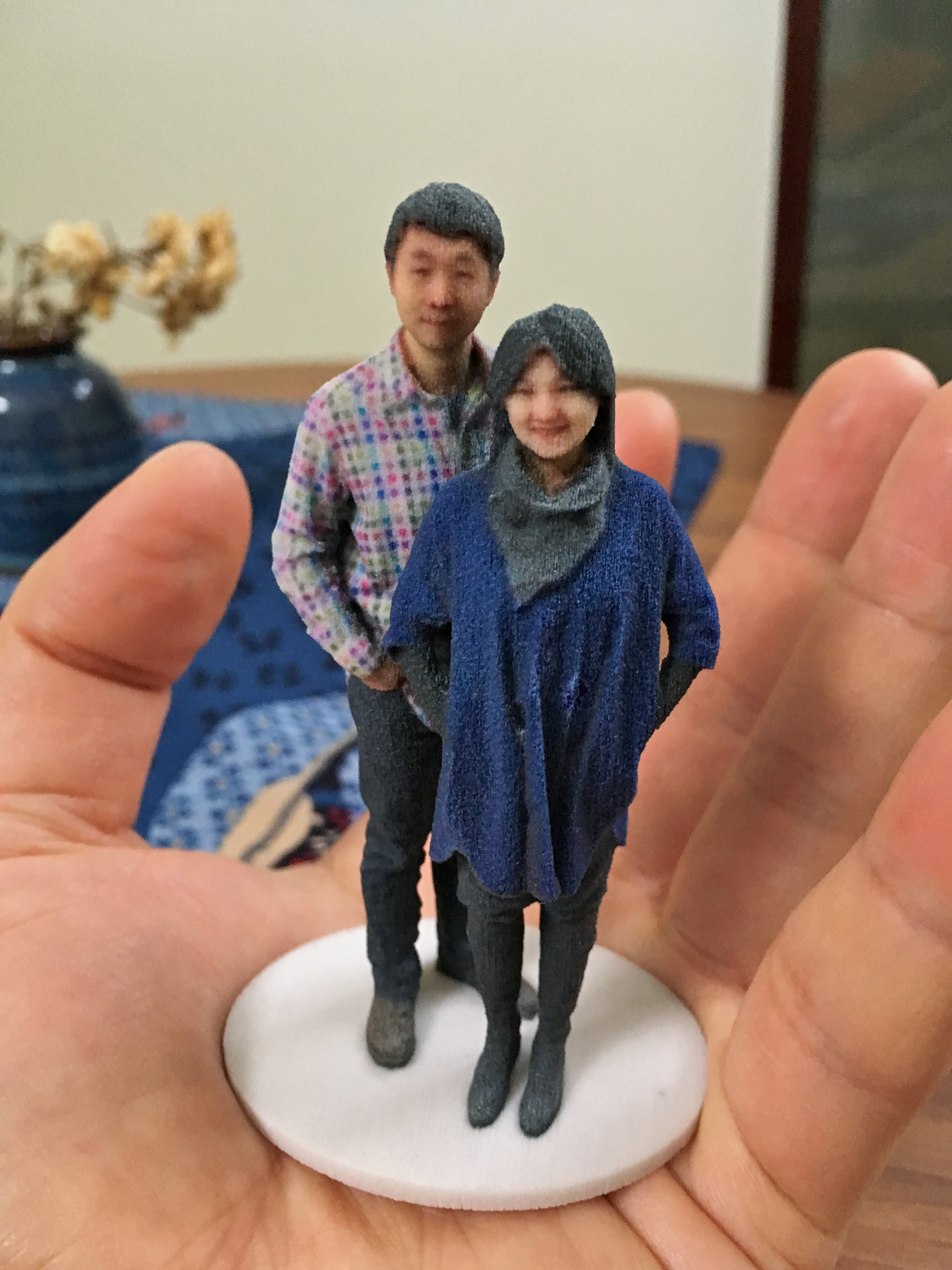
3D selfie created at the Fantasitron and printed by Shapeways

Unlike the rest of the park, the Hof van Nederland (Dutch court) is not built as a miniature: it is life-sized. In four minutes the attraction explains the beginning of the Netherlands in 1572. The attraction is inspired by the Hof van Nederland in Dordrecht and was opened on 19 July 2015.

== Inspiration ==
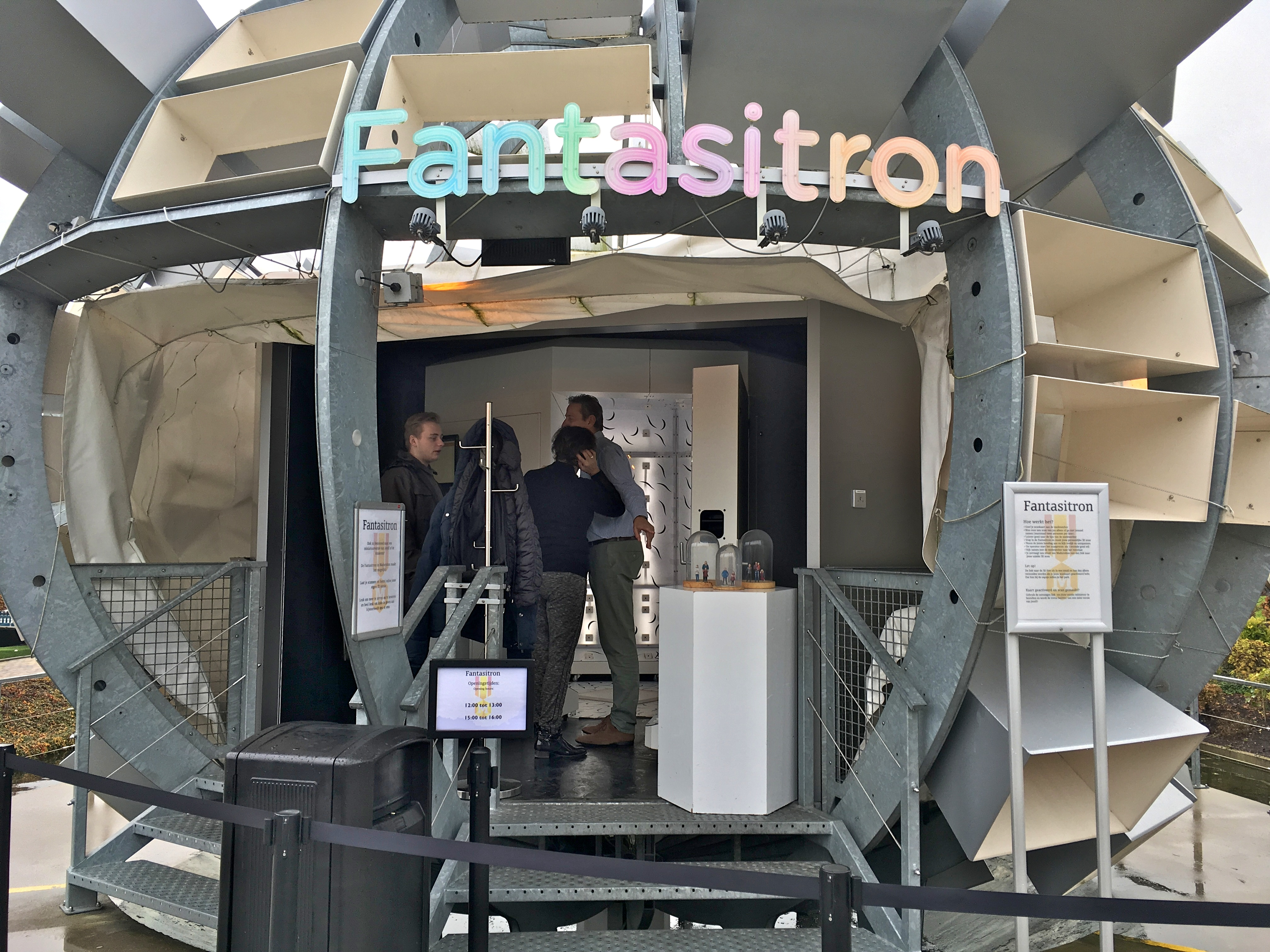
3D selfies are generated from 2D pictures taken at the Fantasitron

The park was the inspiration for Storybook Land, an attraction opened at Disneyland in 1956 and at Disneyland Paris in 1994. Additionally, it was a visit to Madurodam that inspired Fernando de Ercilla Ayestarán to promote construction of the Catalunya en Miniatura project, one of the largest miniature parks in the world, opened in Catalonia, Spain, in 1983.
