= Mapes, North Dakota =

- Unincorporated community
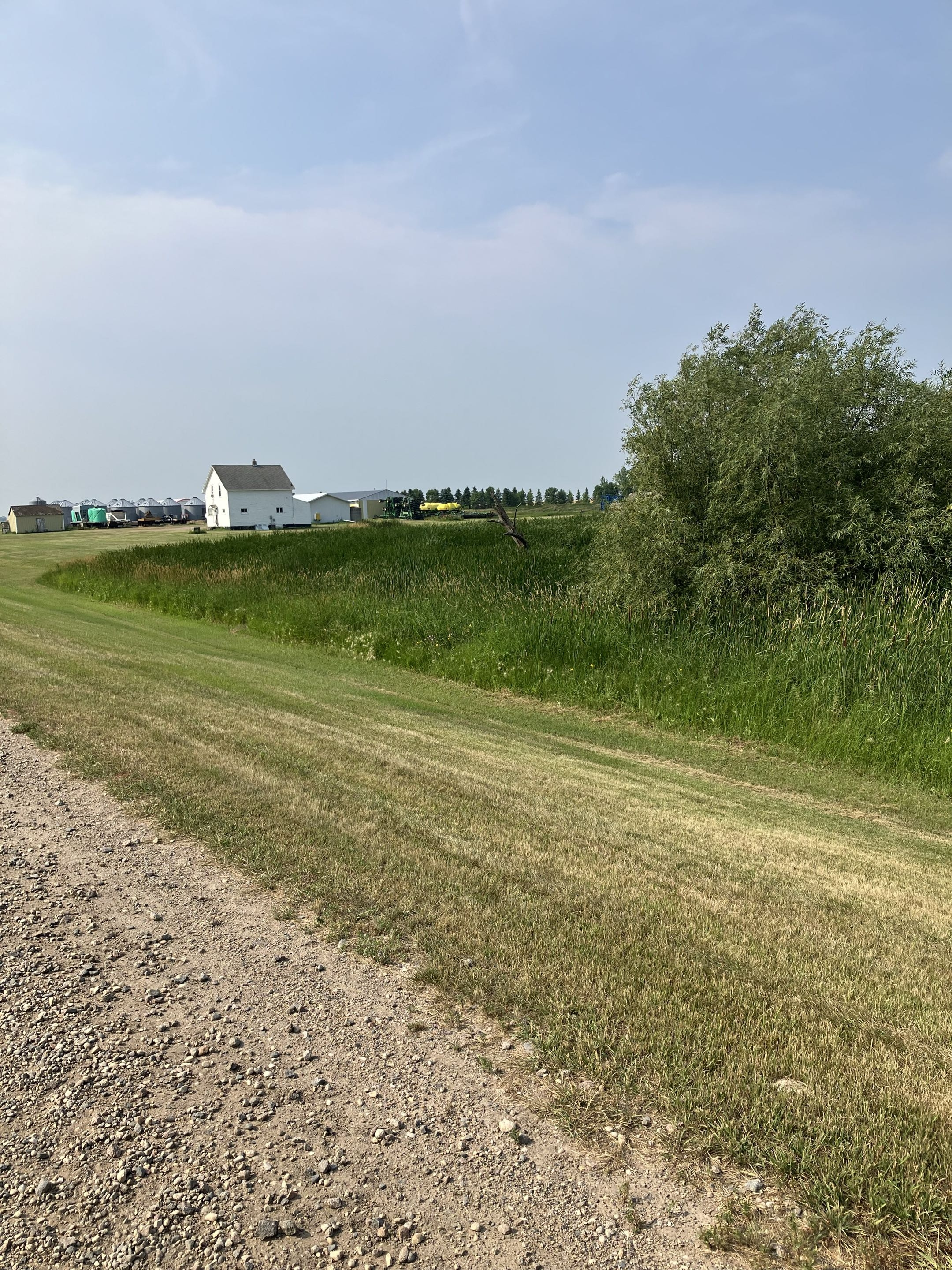

- Location within North Dakota
- Coordinates: 48°1′51.99″N 98°13′38.37″W
- Country: United States
- State: North Dakota
- County: Nelson County
- Elevation: 1,526 ft (465 m)
- Time zone: UTC-6 (Central (CST))
  - Summer (DST): UTC-5 (CDT)
- Area code: 701
- GNIS feature ID: 1030091

Mapes is an unincorporated community in northern Nelson County, North Dakota, United States. It lies approximately 6 miles (9.7 km) east of the city of the county seat Lakota, along U.S. Route 2. Mapes' elevation is 1,526 feet (465 m).

== History ==
Emory Mapes

Mapes was founded in 1882 by Emory Mapes. Born September 24, 1853, in Aurora, Illinois. After attending Ripon College in Ripon, Wisconsin, Emory Mapes moved to Rochester, Minnesota in 1874 where he worked as a store clerk and wed Emma Allen. Mapes eventually removed his family to Grand Forks, North Dakota, where he grew connected with the milling industry. He founded the town of Mapes along the St. Paul, Minneapolis, Manitoba Railway, named after himself. An elevator and post office were built soon after. By 1890 the population had grown to 100, now boasting a school, grocery store, saloon, hotel, and several shops.

In February 1890 a fire broke out in a barn belonging to Emory Mapes. 100 heads of cattle were killed in the fire, representing a total loss of $15,000 for Emory. This marked the start of the decline of Mapes. Emory Mapes cofounded the Grand Forks Diamond Milling Company, which constructed a mill along the banks of the Red River in Grand Forks. The plant's head miller, Tom Amidon, invented Cream of Wheat in 1893. The mill was financially struggling after the Panic of 1893, so Emory and his two other business' partners included some Cream of Wheat along with a shipment of flour to New York, hoping it would catch on with the recipients. Cream of Wheat was a commercial success, due in part to an aggressive marketing campaign featuring a caricature of a black chef named "Rastus" which was designed by Emory Mapes, which he hand-stamped on early shipments. Diamond Milling Company outgrew its Grand Forks facilities and moved to Minneapolis, Minnesota in 1897. Emory left North Dakota to follow the bustling mill to Minneapolis, leaving Mapes to continue its decline.

Fires have long plagued Mapes. Nelson County's first church burned down in 1902. The general store burned in 1908, followed by the Hartin Grain Company elevator in 1911. Mapes Hall, an event hall, burned in 1913 but was later rebuilt in 1929. By 1960 the population had nearly halved to just 55 as the fires continued. Another grain elevator burned down in 1961 and in 1976 a house that also contained the post office burned down. The post office was reopened in a new location before closing in 1980, along with the Mapes School. In 1980 just 8 residents remained, and by 1990 just two businesses left. Mapes Hall closed in 1997, and the last grain elevator burned down in 1997. In 1998 the Old West tavern burned, marking the closure of the last business in town.

Mapes died a millionaire in Minneapolis in 1921 still holding great business and political influence, his Minnesota residence was used as the consulate for the Republic of Columbia after his death. With the closure of the Old Diamond Milling Company and removal of the black chef character from the Cream of Wheat packing, not much remains of the history of Emory Mapes' history in North Dakota. Mapes is now mostly empty, still containing a few houses holding on to the history of the once booming small town.
