= Mapes, British Columbia =

Mapes
- settlement
- Location of Mapes in British Columbia
- Coordinates: 53°52′N 123°54′W
- Country: Canada
- Province: British Columbia
- Region: Interior Plateau
- Regional district: Regional District of Bulkley-Nechako
- Time zone: UTC−07:00 (Pacific Time)

Mapes is a settlement in central British Columbia, Canada. The major employment is in forestry, and the major employer is Canfor (Canadian Forest Products). Mapes is 8.2 km away from the Sinkut River community, 13.2 km from Weneez, and 19.6 km from Vanderhoof.
