= McVille, North Dakota =

- City
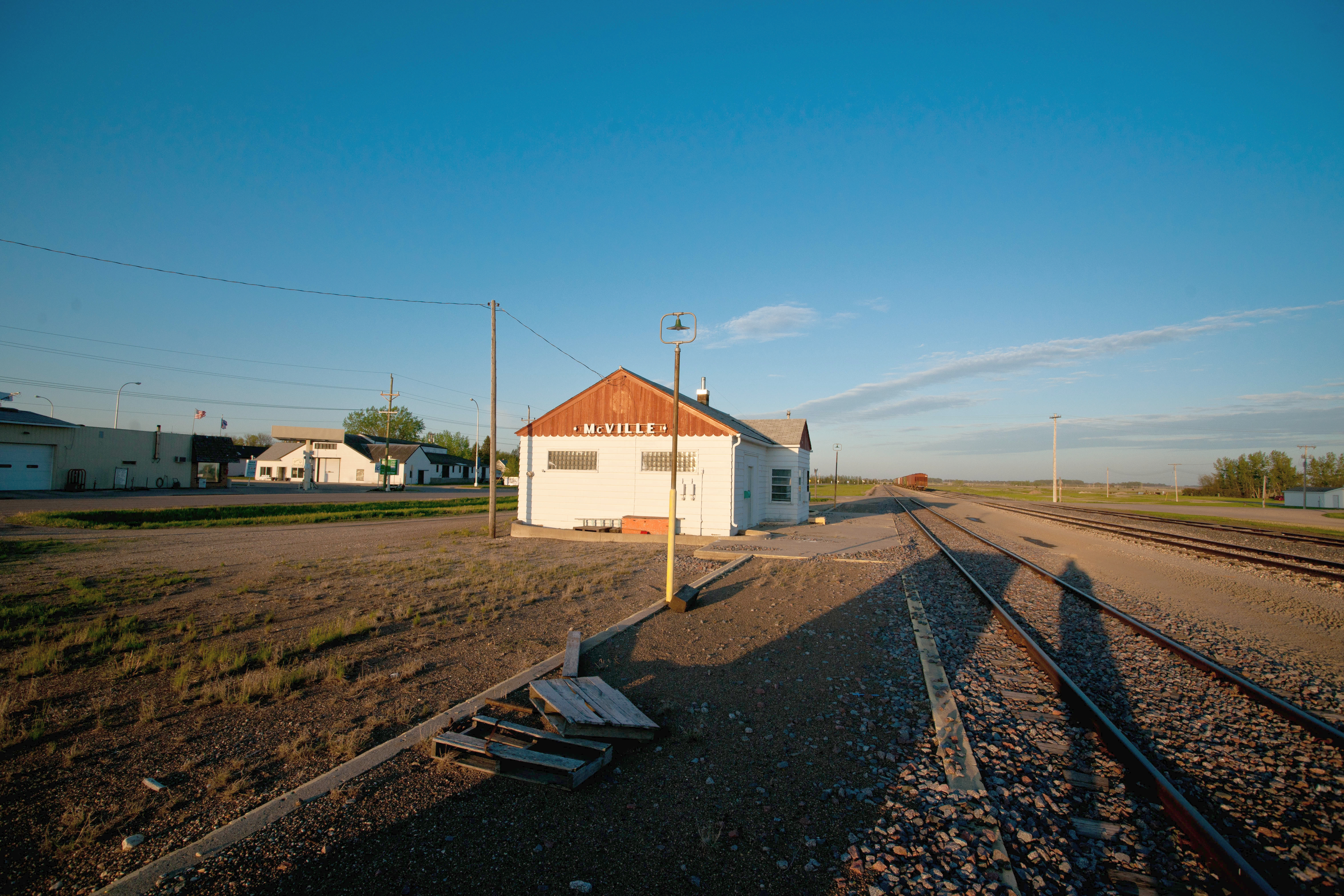
- McVille
- Motto(s): "Small enough to know you, yet large enough to serve you"
- Location of McVille, North Dakota
- Coordinates: 47°45′55″N 98°10′32″W
- Country: United States
- State: North Dakota
- County: Nelson
- Founded: 1906

Area
  - Total: 1.50 sq mi (3.89 km^{2})
  - Land: 1.44 sq mi (3.72 km^{2})
  - Water: 0.066 sq mi (0.17 km^{2})
- Elevation: 1,470 ft (448 m)

Population (2020)
  - Total: 392
  - Estimate (2022): 380
  - Density: 272.9/sq mi (105.37/km^{2})
- Time zone: UTC-6 (Central (CST))
  - Summer (DST): UTC-5 (CDT)
- ZIP code: 58254
- Area code: 701
- FIPS code: 38-49580
- GNIS feature ID: 1036143
- Website: mcville.com

McVille is a city in Nelson County, North Dakota, United States. The population was 392 at the 2020 census. McVille was founded in 1906.

== History ==
McVille was founded in 1906 after the railroad was established as a continuation from Aneta, North Dakota. McVille was founded by the McDougall family. The town was so named because many of the early residents in the area had last names starting with "Mc".

The original town was a few miles away from its present location. With the advancement of the railroad system, the town was moved.

Prominent early businesses included an elevator, a bank, a blacksmith shop, and a general store.

== Geography ==
According to the United States Census Bureau, the city has an area of 1.51 square miles (3.91 km^{2}), of which 1.44 square miles (3.73 km^{2}) is land and 0.07 square miles (0.18 km^{2}) is water.

== Demographics ==
Historical population
Census	Pop.	Note	%±
1910	310		—
1920	546		76.1%
1930	513		−6.0%
1940	548		6.8%
1950	626		14.2%
1960	551		−12.0%
1970	583		5.8%
1980	626		7.4%
1990	559		−10.7%
2000	470		−15.9%
2010	349		−25.7%
2020	392		12.3%
2022 (est.)	380		−3.1%
U.S. Decennial Census; 2020 Census

=== 2010 census ===
As of the census of 2010, there were 349 people, 190 households, and 95 families residing in the city. The population density was 242.4 inhabitants per square mile (93.6/km^{2}). There were 247 housing units at an average density of 171.5 per square mile (66.2/km^{2}). The racial makeup of the city was 98.3% White, 0.3% African American, and 1.4% from two or more races. Hispanic or Latino of any race were 0.3% of the population.

There were 190 households, of which 16.3% had children under the age of 18 living with them, 42.1% were married couples living together, 6.3% had a female householder with no husband present, 1.6% had a male householder with no wife present, and 50.0% were non-families. 47.4% of all households were made up of individuals, and 24.2% had someone living alone who was 65 years of age or older. The average household size was 1.84 and the average family size was 2.59.

The median age in the city was 52.9 years. 15.2% of residents were under the age of 18; 4.6% were between the ages of 18 and 24; 17.5% were from 25 to 44; 35.3% were from 45 to 64; and 27.5% were 65 years of age or older. The gender makeup of the city was 47.0% male and 53.0% female.

=== 2000 census ===
As of the census of 2000, there were 470 people, 217 households, and 106 families residing in the city. The population density was 326.9 inhabitants per square mile (126.2/km^{2}). There were 266 housing units at an average density of 185.0 per square mile (71.4/km^{2}). The racial makeup of the city was 99.42% White.

There were 217 households, out of which 20.3% had children under the age of 18 living with them, 41.9% were married couples living together, 6.9% had a female householder with no husband present, and 50.7% were non-families. 49.3% of all households were made up of individuals, and 27.6% had someone living alone who was 65 years of age or older. The average household size was 1.95 and the average family size was 2.82.

In the city, the population was spread out, with 18.9% under the age of 18, 3.4% from 18 to 24, 16.4% from 25 to 44, 24.0% from 45 to 64, and 37.2% who were 65 years of age or older. The median age was 52 years. For every 100 females, there were 83.6 males. For every 100 females age 18 and over, there were 83.2 males.

The median income for a household in the city was $21,818, and the median income for a family was $36,250. Males had a median income of $24,531 versus $22,083 for females. The per capita income for the city was $19,776. About 11.9% of families and 16.7% of the population were below the poverty line, including 26.4% of those under age 18 and 12.3% of those age 65 or over.

== Climate ==
This climatic region is typified by large seasonal temperature differences, with warm to hot (and often humid) summers and cold (sometimes severely cold) winters. According to the Köppen Climate Classification system, McVille has a humid continental climate, abbreviated "Dfb" on climate maps.
