= Mary Mapes Dodge =

American children's author and editor (1831–1905)

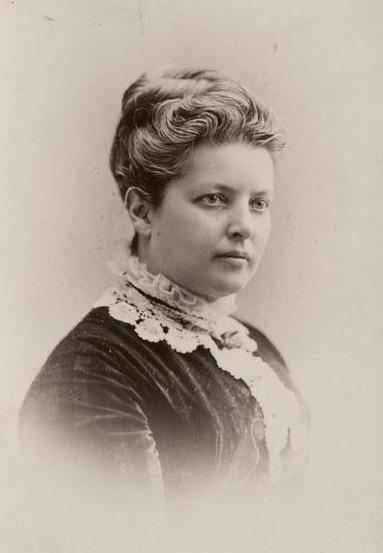
- "A Woman of the Century"
- Born: Mary Elizabeth Mapes; January 26, 1831; New York City, US
- Died: August 21, 1905 (aged 74); Tannersville, New York, US
- Occupations: Children's writer, editor
- Spouse: William Dodge (m. 1851; died 1858)
- Children: James Mapes Dodge, Harrington M. Dodge
- Parent: James Jay Mapes
- Writing career
- Notable work: Hans Brinker, or The Silver Skates

Mary Elizabeth Mapes Dodge (January 26, 1831 – August 21, 1905) was an American children's author and editor, best known for her novel Hans Brinker. She was the recognized leader in juvenile literature for almost a third of the nineteenth century.

Dodge conducted St. Nicholas Magazine for more than 30 years, and it became one of the most successful magazines for children.

She was able to persuade many of the great writers of the world to contribute to her children's magazine – Mark Twain, Louisa May Alcott, Robert Louis Stevenson, Alfred, Lord Tennyson, Henry Wadsworth Longfellow, William Cullen Bryant, Oliver Wendell Holmes Sr., Bret Harte, John Hay, Charles Dudley Warner, Elizabeth Stuart Phelps Ward, and scores of others. One day, Rudyard Kipling told her a story of the Indian jungle; Dodge asked him to write it down for St. Nicholas. He never had written for children, but he would try. The result was The Jungle Book.

After the death of her husband, Dodge turned to literature as a means to earn the money to educate her sons. She began to write short sketches for children, and soon brought out a volume of them, entitled Irvington Stories, (New York, 1864), which was very successful. She next published Hans Brinker, or The Silver Skates (New York, 1865); translated into Dutch, French, German, Russian and Italian, and was awarded a prize of 1,500 francs by the French Academy. With Donald Grant Mitchell and Harriet Beecher Stowe, Dodge was one of the earliest editors of Hearth and Home, and for several years, she conducted the household and children's department of that journal. In 1873, when St. Nicholas Magazine was started, she became its editor. Her other published volumes were A Few Friends, and How They Amused Themselves (Philadelphia, 1860), Rhymes and Jingles (New York, 1874), Theophilus and Others (New York, 1876) Along the Way, poems (New York, 1879), and Donald and Dorothy (New York, 1883). She was the author of "Miss Maloney on the Chinese Question," published in Scribner's Monthly in 1870. Dodge contributed to Harper's Magazine, Atlantic Monthly, the Centur, and other periodicals.

== History ==
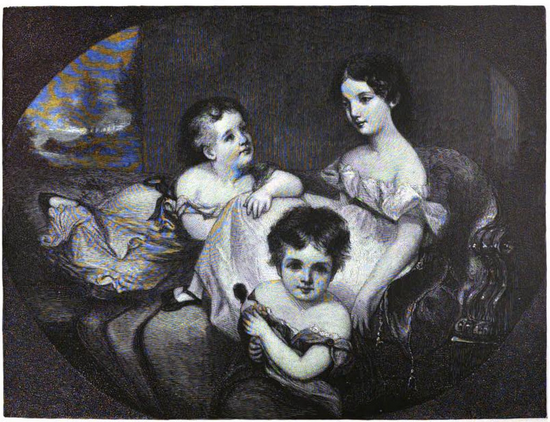
The Sisters, engraved by Timothy Cole, from the portrait-painting by William Page. Mapes, age four, is holding a doll.

Mary Elizabeth Mapes was born January 26, 1831, in New York City. Her parents were James Jay Mapes, the distinguished promoter of scientific farming in the United States, and Sophia Furman (or Ferrman). Her siblings included Charles V. Mapes, Sophia Mapes (Tolles, the artist), and Catherine T. (Bonnell).

The Mapes' daughters never went to school. They were educated at home under the care of tutors and governesses, being carefully trained, not only in the usual English branches, but in French, drawing, music, and Latin. She showed early talents for drawing, modeling, and musical and literary composition.

In 1851, she married William Dodge, a lawyer from New York City. Within the next four years she gave birth to two sons, James and Harrington. In 1857, William faced serious financial difficulties and left his family in 1858. A month after his disappearance, his body was found after he died from an apparent drowning. With her two children, she returned to the family homestead, a large country house near Newark, New Jersey. Here, her life was mainly devoted to her children. As time went on, she found herself obliged to provide the money for their education and it was for this purpose that she turned to writing. A small cottage or farm-house which adjoined the orchard on her father's estate was taken for use as a study, and Dodge and her boys soon transformed it into a cozy "den". In this simply furnished abode, far enough away from the great house to insure quiet, she set to work in earnest. But, one afternoon of every week belonged exclusively to the boys.

== Editor ==
In 1859, she began working with her father to publish two magazines, the Working Farmer and the United States Journal. In 1869, after bringing out a book of home pastimes entitled A Few Friends, she accepted the position of associate editor of Hearth and Home in 1870. The publication was a weekly family paper, of which the editors were Harriet Beecher Stowe and Donald Grant Mitchell. For this journal, she took charge of the household and juvenile departments, and before long, Dodge's reputation as editor equaled that which she had already attained as author. The circulation of the periodical was greatly increased, and the department itself rapidly grew into a very prominent feature of the weekly issues. It was her work in this field which first attracted the attention of Dr. J. G. Holland and Roswell Smith when, early in the 1870s, as directors of the company which published The Century Magazine, they began to consider the publication of a new juvenile monthly. Their decision really hinged upon hers, for they were heartily ready to undertake the project provided they could obtain her consent to assume its management and become its editor.

Smith asked Dodge to edit the new magazine for children. Meanwhile, wishing to give her undivided time to writing, she had refused a very handsome offer to become the editor of Hearth and Home. Her two sons were then at college, and it was eventually the younger son that turned the scale in favor of the Scribner proposition. He had studied till he had no strength, and his mother felt that he needed an extended vacation and change of scene. She herself had long wished to go abroad, and so, when she was offered a salary to begin upon the day of the preliminary offer – this was in April or May – with the understanding that the initial number of the magazine was not to appear until January, and freedom to spend the intervening time where and as she chose, she accepted the offer. From the first everything was left entirely in her hands, including the name, for which she chose St. Nicholas. The house decided to bring out the first number in November, and Dodge returned from Europe, having found nothing in the publications there to modify her original plan. At the end of the year, the new magazine had outstripped all competitors. Indeed, within a few months after the issue of the first number, Messrs. Osgood & Co. acknowledged that they could not stand against their rival, and made a proposition which resulted in the merging of Our Young Folks into St. Nicholas.

== Early writings ==
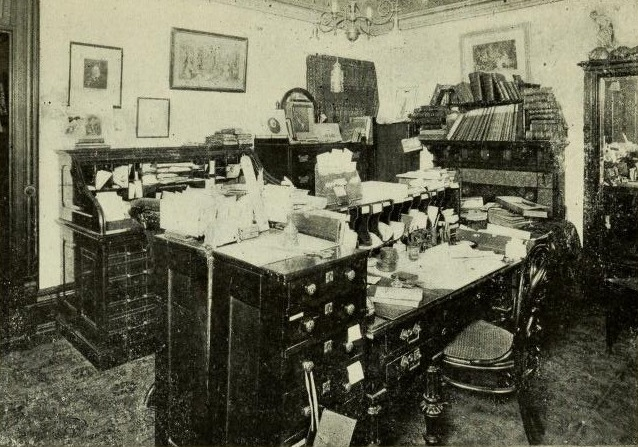
Dodge's desk

Dodge's first published article, "Shoddy Aristocracy in America", and the manner of its publication, were as much the outcome of her susceptibility to the human, as well as the literary, appeal of life as to her sense of humor and instinct for artistic expression. Because it was based upon personal observation the article was sent to The Cornhill Magazine, of London, as a publication safely removed from the comedy and the actors it presented. By return post, she received payment of £50 and a request from The Cornhill for a series of papers. To Dodge's amazement, the article was reprinted in whole or in part by many of the leading newspapers in the United States.

Her first short story, "My Mysterious Enemy", was promptly accepted by Harper's Magazine, and "The Insanity of Cain", a brilliant piece of special pleading, and one of her most characteristic essays in the humorous or satirical vein, attained instant popularity at the time of its publication in Scribner's Monthly. This article grew out of a remark to Roswell Smith when Dodge and he were discussing the recent acquittal of a criminal on the plea of emotional insanity.

After the publication in leading magazines of several essays and stories for grown-up readers, Dodge brought out, in 1864, her first book – made up of short tales for children – under the title of The Irvington Stories (1864). It was a modest muslin-covered duodecimo, with three or four illustrations by F. O. C. Darley. So great was its popularity that the publisher asked for a second series or a sequel.

But Dodge, meantime, had begun work upon a longer narrative. Like the rest of the reading world, she had been thrilled and fascinated by the lately-published histories of John Lothrop Motley, the Rise of the Dutch Republic, and the History of the United Netherlands. She resolved to make the Netherlands the scene of a juvenile tale, and give the youngsters so much of the history of that country as should tell itself, naturally, through the evolution of the story. She was really improvising it as a "good-night story" for her boys – making it up as she went along. In the heat of kindled imagination, she began to tell her children a story of life in the Netherlands, weaving into it much interesting material from the history of that country, which at that time she had never seen. The subject grew more and more absorbing to her. She worked upon the manuscript from morning till night, and sought every source of information which could make her pages more true to life or more entertaining to her readers. She ransacked libraries for books upon the Netherlands; made every traveler whom she knew tell her his tale of that country; and submitted every chapter to the test of the criticism of two accomplished Dutchmen living near her. Upon receiving the manuscript, the publisher, disappointed at not receiving a second collection of short stories, was tempted to reject it. But the author had nothing else ready, he could not afford to forego the prestige of her former success, and so, reluctantly and doubtfully, he issued the most successful juvenile tale of that time, Hans Brinker, or the Silver Skates (1865). It became an instant bestseller and was translated into French, German, Dutch, Russian, and Italian. The French Academy awarded it one of the Montyon Prizes of fifteen hundred francs.

== Midcareer volumes ==
In the year 1874, Dodge published Rhymes and Jingles. From the first issue, its success was almost as great as that of Hans Brinker.

Three years later, in 1877, she published a book of essays and short stories entitled Theophilus and Others. Theophilus and Others was a book of stories and sketches for grown people. Among its contents were a clever satire, "The Insanity of Cain", which at once attracted wide notice, and the mirth-provoking comicality in Irish dialect, "Miss Maloney on the Chinese Question". This skit – which was compared in rank to Bret Harte's "Heathen Chinee" – had an enormous popularity in its day, and was later included in many collections of humorous masterpieces. It was written in a single evening, to fill a blank space in a magazine. Charlotte Cushman immediately gave it a place of honor in her public readings as one of her favorite selections, and sending for its author, asked her to write a companion-piece. A long and warm friendship between the two distinguished women dated from this interview.

In 1879, a collection of poems and verses for grown-up readers, entitled Along the Way, was published. With her usual modesty, Dodge would not dignify her volume of verse by the name of "poems", preferring the simple title of " Along the Way". But, as one critic said of it at the time, "It is a happy thing for those of us who do not walk such ways to have her show us what may there be seen." In 1883, Dodge was persuaded to issue a new edition of this work, under the title Poems and Verses. Throughout, it shows sincerity of poetic feeling; a rich imagination; a genuine love of nature; and a happy serenity of heart. "Enfoldings", the sonnet on "The Stars", "Inverted", and "The Two Mysteries" were particularly praised. Her works found their way into various anthologies whose editors – some of them distinguished critics – were quite willing to call them poems, even if their author was not.

In 1894, she brought out two other books: The Land of Pluck, a collection of sketches and stories which takes its name from the opening article about Holland, and When Life is Young, which opens with her well-known poem "The Minuet", and contains many other favorite pieces. Both books won praise from critics, and a very large audience among young readers. During her career as an editor, Dodge published seven books for adults as well as two books for small children, Baby Days and Bay World.

"The Two Mysteries", "Enfoldings", and "The Compact " demonstrated her depth and tenderness of feeling, intellectual poise, spiritual insight, and simplicity of expression.

== Personal life ==
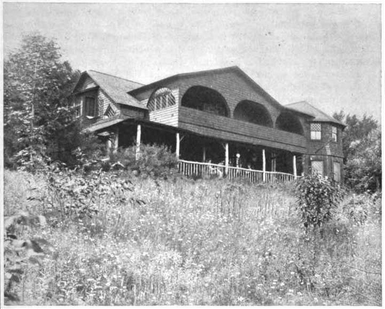
"Yarrow" cottage

Dodge lived in a large apartment-building overlooking Central Park in New York City. In 1888, she purchased a cottage, which she named "Yarrow", in the summer colony at Onteora Park, Onteora Park, Tannersville, New York, upon the slope of Onteora Mountain, in the Catskill Mountains. In the beginning, it was a simple little square frame-house, and Dodge took great delight in adding, year by year, a room or a veranda, a bay-window or an extension, until she created, at last, a many-gabled home, to which she returned each season.

One of her sons died in 1881, and the other, James Mapes Dodge, was a successful inventor and manufacturer, residing in Philadelphia, Pennsylvania. Her daughter-in-law, Mrs. James Mapes Dodge (Josephine Kern), was the sculptor of The Good Fairy Statue in 1916.

Dodge had been suffering from a severe illness for several months, and it was hoped that the usual sojourn in her summer cottage at Onteora might restore her to health, but she steadily grew weaker until her death on August 21, 1905.

== Style and themes ==
Dodge's writing interpreted childhood. "The child's world is a different world, a preparatory world, a world that is coming on. You must build yourself around the humanity of childhood." And again, "The natural thing is the thing that grasps a child in literature as well as in life." Underlying a style of spontaneous charm, and coupled with humor whose thrusts leave no sting, are intellectual integrity, delight in discovering and acknowledging in others gifts of mind or spirit, responsiveness, a quickness to feel and believe as buoyant as if her energies had not been claimed by an absorbing profession, and an outlook undimmed by ambitions and activities.

== Selected works ==
Prose

- The Irvington Stories (1864)
- Hans Brinker, or The Silver Skates (1865)
- A Few Friends and How They Amused Themselves (1869)
- Baby Days (1876)
- Theophilus and Others (1876)
- Donald and Dorothy (1883)
- Baby World (1884)
- The Land of Pluck (1894)

Verse

- Rhymes and Jingles (1874)
- Along the Way (1879)
- When Life Is Young (1894)
