= 1944 United States presidential election in New York =

- November 7, 1944
- Turnout: 70.9% ▼4.8 pp

| Nominee | Franklin D. Roosevelt | Thomas E. Dewey |
| Party | Democratic | Republican |
| Alliance | Parties: American Labor; Liberal |
| Home state | New York | New York |
| Running mate | Harry S. Truman | John W. Bricker |
| Electoral vote | 47 | 0 |
| Popular vote | 3,304,238 | 2,987,647 |
| Percentage | 52.31% | 47.30% |
County results
Roosevelt
50–60%
60–70%
Dewey
50–60%
60–70%
70–80%
President before election
Franklin D. Roosevelt
Democratic
Elected President
Franklin D. Roosevelt
Democratic

World War II was a huge factor in President Roosevelt's race for the presidency in 1944. Here Roosevelt can be seen meeting with other Allied leaders at the 1943 Cairo Conferences, about 1 year before D-Day.

The 1944 United States presidential election in New York took place on November 7, 1944. All contemporary 48 states were part of the 1944 United States presidential election. Voters chose 47 electors to the Electoral College, which selected the president and vice president. New York was the home state of both major party nominees. It was won by incumbent Democratic President Franklin D. Roosevelt, who was running against incumbent Republican Party Governor Thomas E. Dewey. Roosevelt ran with U.S. Senator from Missouri Harry S. Truman, and Dewey ran with Ohio Governor John W. Bricker, an opponent during the 1944 Republican primaries, as vice president.

New York weighed in for this election as 2% more Republican than the national average. The presidential election of 1944 was a very partisan one for New York, with more than 99.6% of the electorate casting votes for either the Democratic Party or the Republican Party. In typical form for the time, the highly populated centers of New York City, Albany, Buffalo, and Rochester voted primarily Democratic, while the majority of smaller counties in New York turned out for Dewey as the Republican candidate. Much of Roosevelt's margin of victory was provided by his dominance in New York City. Roosevelt took over 60% of the vote in Manhattan, Brooklyn and the Bronx, and decisively won New York City as a whole, although the boroughs of Queens and Staten Island remained Republican as they had voted in 1940.

Any advantage Dewey had as the incumbent governor was nullified by New York being Roosevelt's home state as well. A former governor himself, the immensely popular Roosevelt won New York by a solid five-point margin. Dewey campaigned against much of Roosevelt's New Deal, claiming that it suffocated job growth in the country, while Roosevelt's campaign focused on maintaining the New Deal and putting an end to World War II as quickly as possible. Dewey's stance on the New Deal put him and his campaign in sharp contradiction with the majority of voters across the country, including states such as New York, which had suffered through years of over 15% unemployment during the Great Depression, and who largely attributed the economic recovery to Roosevelt's leadership and heightened federal regulation and spending.

The 1944 presidential election was the last time until 2016 in which both major party candidates declared New York as their home state. Along with his first run for governor in 1938, the 1944 presidential election marked the only time that Dewey lost a statewide vote in New York. The 1944 presidential election was also the only time that Dewey lost a statewide vote in New York during his time as governor, as Dewey would carry the state in 1948 against Roosevelt's successor Truman. Subsequent to 1944, Dewey would be reelected as governor in 1946 and 1950 before not seeking reelection in 1954. New York was one of six states that shifted left from 1940, alongside Illinois, Michigan, Minnesota, North Dakota, and Rhode Island.

== Results ==
1944 United States presidential election in New York
| Party | Candidate | Votes | Percentage | Electoral votes |
|---|---|---|---|---|
| Democratic | Franklin D. Roosevelt | 2,478,598 | 39.24% | |
| American Labor | Franklin D. Roosevelt | 496,405 | 7.86% | |
| Liberal | Franklin D. Roosevelt | 329,235 | 5.21% | |
| Total | Franklin D. Roosevelt (incumbent) | 3,304,238 | 52.31% | 47 |
| Republican | Thomas E. Dewey | 2,987,647 | 47.30% | 0 |
| Socialist Labor | Edward A. Teichert | 14,352 | 0.23% | 0 |
| Socialist | Norman Thomas | 10,553 | 0.17% | 0 |
| Totals | | 6,316,790 | 100.00% | 47 |

=== New York City results ===
| 1944 Presidential Election in New York City | | Manhattan | The Bronx | Brooklyn | Queens | Staten Island | Total | |
| Democratic- American Labor- Liberal | Franklin D. Roosevelt | 509,263 | 450,525 | 758,270 | 292,940 | 31,502 | 2,042,500 | 61.33% |
| Democratic- American Labor- Liberal | Franklin D. Roosevelt | 65.90% | 67.74% | 65.46% | 44.36% | 42.62% | 2,042,500 | 61.33% |
| Republican | Thomas E. Dewey | 258,650 | 211,158 | 393,926 | 365,365 | 42,188 | 1,271,287 | 38.17% |
| Republican | Thomas E. Dewey | 33.47% | 31.75% | 34.01% | 55.33% | 57.07% | 1,271,287 | 38.17% |
| Socialist Labor | Edward A. Teichert | 3,226 | 2,416 | 4,209 | 1,013 | 106 | 10,970 | 0.33% |
| Socialist Labor | Edward A. Teichert | 0.42% | 0.36% | 0.36% | 0.15% | 0.14% | 10,970 | 0.33% |
| Socialist | Norman Thomas | 1,622 | 936 | 1,959 | 1,057 | 119 | 5,693 | 0.17% |
| Socialist | Norman Thomas | 0.21% | 0.14% | 0.17% | 0.16% | 0.16% | 5,693 | 0.17% |
| TOTAL | | 772,777 | 665,035 | 1,158,364 | 660,376 | 73,918 | 3,330,470 | 100.00% |

=== Results by county ===
| County | Franklin D. Roosevelt Democratic/American Labor/Liberal | | Thomas E. Dewey Republican | | Various candidates Other parties | | Margin | | Total votes cast |
| County | # | % | # | % | # | % | # | % | Total votes cast |
|---|---|---|---|---|---|---|---|---|---|
| Albany | 71,128 | 53.90% | 60,543 | 45.88% | 289 | 0.22% | 10,585 | 8.02% | 131,960 |
| Allegany | 4,786 | 26.18% | 13,454 | 73.60% | 39 | 0.21% | -8,668 | -47.42% | 18,279 |
| Bronx | 450,525 | 67.74% | 211,158 | 31.75% | 3,352 | 0.50% | 239,367 | 35.99% | 665,035 |
| Broome | 31,056 | 41.29% | 44,013 | 58.52% | 137 | 0.18% | -12,957 | -17.23% | 75,206 |
| Cattaraugus | 11,787 | 37.07% | 19,907 | 62.61% | 101 | 0.32% | -8,120 | -25.54% | 31,795 |
| Cayuga | 13,849 | 42.44% | 18,680 | 57.25% | 100 | 0.31% | -4,831 | -14.81% | 32,629 |
| Chautauqua | 22,086 | 40.03% | 32,824 | 59.49% | 264 | 0.48% | -10,738 | -19.46% | 55,174 |
| Chemung | 15,064 | 40.32% | 22,198 | 59.42% | 97 | 0.26% | -7,134 | -19.10% | 37,359 |
| Chenango | 4,997 | 28.11% | 12,745 | 71.69% | 37 | 0.21% | -7,748 | -43.58% | 17,779 |
| Clinton | 9,996 | 53.15% | 8,775 | 46.66% | 35 | 0.19% | 1,221 | 6.49% | 18,806 |
| Columbia | 6,969 | 34.71% | 13,055 | 65.02% | 54 | 0.27% | -6,086 | -30.31% | 20,078 |
| Cortland | 4,967 | 32.17% | 10,450 | 67.68% | 24 | 0.16% | -5,483 | -35.51% | 15,441 |
| Delaware | 5,128 | 25.55% | 14,916 | 74.32% | 25 | 0.12% | -9,788 | -48.77% | 20,069 |
| Dutchess | 22,778 | 40.80% | 32,890 | 58.92% | 158 | 0.28% | -10,112 | -18.11% | 55,826 |
| Erie | 195,905 | 51.12% | 185,975 | 48.53% | 1,355 | 0.35% | 9,930 | 2.59% | 383,235 |
| Essex | 4,637 | 31.34% | 10,128 | 68.44% | 33 | 0.22% | -5,491 | -37.11% | 14,798 |
| Franklin | 8,060 | 46.53% | 9,225 | 53.25% | 39 | 0.23% | -1,165 | -6.72% | 17,324 |
| Fulton | 8,813 | 39.93% | 13,195 | 59.79% | 62 | 0.28% | -4,382 | -19.86% | 22,070 |
| Genesee | 6,796 | 33.44% | 13,478 | 66.32% | 50 | 0.25% | -6,682 | -32.88% | 20,324 |
| Greene | 5,231 | 34.73% | 9,807 | 65.10% | 26 | 0.17% | -4,576 | -30.38% | 15,064 |
| Hamilton | 830 | 31.05% | 1,834 | 68.61% | 9 | 0.34% | -1,004 | -37.56% | 2,673 |
| Herkimer | 12,381 | 44.08% | 15,656 | 55.75% | 48 | 0.17% | -3,275 | -11.66% | 28,085 |
| Jefferson | 14,449 | 39.77% | 21,834 | 60.10% | 46 | 0.13% | -7,385 | -20.33% | 36,329 |
| Kings | 758,270 | 65.46% | 393,926 | 34.01% | 6,168 | 0.53% | 364,344 | 31.45% | 1,158,364 |
| Lewis | 3,441 | 35.42% | 6,256 | 64.40% | 18 | 0.19% | -2,815 | -28.98% | 9,715 |
| Livingston | 6,351 | 35.73% | 11,383 | 64.04% | 41 | 0.23% | -5,032 | -28.31% | 17,775 |
| Madison | 6,109 | 31.31% | 13,369 | 68.51% | 36 | 0.18% | -7,260 | -37.20% | 19,514 |
| Monroe | 119,672 | 51.52% | 111,725 | 48.10% | 876 | 0.38% | 7,947 | 3.42% | 232,273 |
| Montgomery | 14,400 | 49.33% | 14,726 | 50.45% | 63 | 0.22% | -326 | -1.12% | 29,189 |
| Nassau | 78,512 | 32.88% | 159,713 | 66.88% | 576 | 0.24% | -81,201 | -34.00% | 238,801 |
| New York | 509,263 | 65.90% | 258,650 | 33.47% | 4,864 | 0.63% | 250,613 | 32.43% | 772,777 |
| Niagara | 34,850 | 47.96% | 37,614 | 51.76% | 202 | 0.28% | -2,764 | -3.80% | 72,666 |
| Oneida | 48,371 | 49.69% | 48,749 | 50.08% | 224 | 0.23% | -378 | -0.39% | 97,344 |
| Onondaga | 73,562 | 47.57% | 80,507 | 52.06% | 569 | 0.37% | -6,945 | -4.49% | 154,638 |
| Ontario | 9,437 | 35.80% | 16,859 | 63.95% | 68 | 0.26% | -7,422 | -28.15% | 26,364 |
| Orange | 24,059 | 38.03% | 39,041 | 61.71% | 162 | 0.26% | -14,982 | -23.68% | 63,262 |
| Orleans | 4,006 | 28.56% | 9,998 | 71.28% | 22 | 0.16% | -5,992 | -42.72% | 14,026 |
| Oswego | 12,593 | 38.92% | 19,733 | 60.99% | 29 | 0.09% | -7,140 | -22.07% | 32,355 |
| Otsego | 7,849 | 33.67% | 15,427 | 66.17% | 37 | 0.16% | -7,578 | -32.51% | 23,313 |
| Putnam | 4,251 | 37.64% | 7,010 | 62.07% | 33 | 0.29% | -2,759 | -24.43% | 11,294 |
| Queens | 292,940 | 44.36% | 365,365 | 55.33% | 2,071 | 0.31% | -72,425 | -10.97% | 660,376 |
| Rensselaer | 30,173 | 44.29% | 37,819 | 55.51% | 139 | 0.20% | -7,646 | -11.22% | 68,131 |
| Richmond | 31,502 | 42.62% | 42,188 | 57.07% | 228 | 0.31% | -10,686 | -14.46% | 73,918 |
| Rockland | 13,437 | 40.72% | 19,471 | 59.00% | 91 | 0.28% | -6,034 | -18.29% | 32,999 |
| Saratoga | 13,788 | 40.45% | 20,197 | 59.26% | 98 | 0.29% | -6,409 | -18.80% | 34,083 |
| Schenectady | 33,397 | 48.49% | 35,178 | 51.08% | 294 | 0.43% | -1,781 | -2.59% | 68,869 |
| Schoharie | 4,219 | 39.06% | 6,546 | 60.61% | 36 | 0.33% | -2,327 | -21.54% | 10,801 |
| Schuyler | 1,767 | 28.14% | 4,506 | 71.76% | 6 | 0.10% | -2,739 | -43.62% | 6,279 |
| Seneca | 4,236 | 36.24% | 7,424 | 63.52% | 28 | 0.24% | -3,188 | -27.28% | 11,688 |
| St. Lawrence | 15,223 | 40.90% | 21,919 | 58.89% | 77 | 0.21% | -6,696 | -17.99% | 37,219 |
| Steuben | 13,461 | 34.45% | 25,538 | 65.36% | 73 | 0.19% | -12,077 | -30.91% | 39,072 |
| Suffolk | 31,231 | 32.15% | 65,650 | 67.59% | 253 | 0.26% | -34,419 | -35.43% | 97,134 |
| Sullivan | 8,836 | 43.81% | 11,258 | 55.82% | 73 | 0.36% | -2,422 | -12.01% | 20,167 |
| Tioga | 3,831 | 29.95% | 8,934 | 69.85% | 25 | 0.20% | -5,103 | -39.90% | 12,790 |
| Tompkins | 7,174 | 35.78% | 12,805 | 63.86% | 74 | 0.37% | -5,631 | -28.08% | 20,053 |
| Ulster | 16,943 | 38.72% | 26,703 | 61.02% | 117 | 0.27% | -9,760 | -22.30% | 43,763 |
| Warren | 6,716 | 35.54% | 12,144 | 64.26% | 37 | 0.20% | -5,428 | -28.72% | 18,897 |
| Washington | 7,100 | 33.82% | 13,861 | 66.03% | 31 | 0.15% | -6,761 | -32.21% | 20,992 |
| Wayne | 6,999 | 28.50% | 17,523 | 71.36% | 33 | 0.13% | -10,524 | -42.86% | 24,555 |
| Westchester | 107,591 | 38.02% | 174,635 | 61.71% | 756 | 0.27% | -67,044 | -23.69% | 282,982 |
| Wyoming | 4,455 | 30.33% | 10,219 | 69.57% | 15 | 0.10% | -5,764 | -39.24% | 14,689 |
| Yates | 2,005 | 24.01% | 6,338 | 75.89% | 9 | 0.11% | -4,333 | -51.88% | 8,352 |
| Totals | 3,304,238 | 52.31% | 2,987,647 | 47.30% | 24,932 | 0.39% | 316,591 | 5.01% | 6,316,817 |

== See also ==
- United States presidential elections in New York
- Presidency of Franklin D. Roosevelt
- Presidency of Harry S. Truman
- World War II
- Hell-Bent for Election
