= 1944 United States presidential election in Michigan =

- November 7, 1944

All 19 Michigan votes to the Electoral College

Nominee	Franklin D. Roosevelt	Thomas E. Dewey
Party	Democratic	Republican
Home state	New York	New York
Running mate	Harry S. Truman	John W. Bricker
Electoral vote	19	0
Popular vote	1,106,899	1,084,423
Percentage	50.19%	49.18%
County results
Roosevelt
50–60%
60–70%
Dewey
50–60%
60–70%
70–80%
80–90%
President before election
Franklin D. Roosevelt
Democratic
Elected President
Franklin D. Roosevelt
Democratic

The 1944 United States presidential election in Michigan took place on November 7, 1944, as part of the 1944 United States presidential election. Voters chose 19 representatives, or electors, to the Electoral College, who voted for president and vice president.

Michigan voted narrowly for Democratic nominee, incumbent Franklin D. Roosevelt over Republican Governor of New York Thomas E. Dewey, carrying 50.19% of the vote to Dewey's 49.18%. The election was close, with Detroit, Flint and most of the Upper Peninsula going to Roosevelt and most of the rest of the state going to Dewey. Michigan would not vote Democratic again until John F. Kennedy narrowly won the state in 1960. Michigan was the only state Willkie won in 1940 that Roosevelt managed to flip. Michigan was also one of six states that shifted left from 1940, alongside Illinois, Minnesota, New York, North Dakota, and Rhode Island.

== Results ==
1944 United States presidential election in Michigan
Party	Candidate	Votes	%
Democratic	Franklin D. Roosevelt (inc.)	1,106,899	50.19%
Republican	Thomas Dewey	1,084,423	49.18%
Prohibition	Claude A. Watson	6,503	0.29%
Socialist	Norman Thomas	4,598	0.21%
America First	Gerald L. K. Smith	1,530	0.07%
Socialist Labor	Edward A. Teichert	1,264	0.06%
Write-in	Scattering	6	0.00%
Total votes		2,205,223	100.00%

=== Results by county ===
County	Franklin D. Roosevelt Democratic		Thomas E. Dewey Republican		Claude A. Watson Prohibition		Norman Thomas Socialist		All Others Various		Margin		Total votes cast
County	#	%	#	%	#	%	#	%	#	%	#	%	Total votes cast
Alcona	716	32.11%	1,503	67.40%	5	0.22%	2	0.09%	4	0.18%	-787	-35.29%	2,230
Alger	2,519	62.41%	1,504	37.26%	8	0.20%	2	0.05%	3	0.07%	1,015	25.15%	4,036
Allegan	4,480	26.54%	12,327	73.04%	46	0.27%	18	0.11%	7	0.04%	-7,847	-46.49%	16,878
Alpena	2,856	38.98%	4,453	60.78%	13	0.18%	4	0.05%	1	0.01%	-1,597	-21.80%	7,327
Antrim	1,206	31.07%	2,626	67.66%	42	1.08%	2	0.05%	5	0.13%	-1,420	-36.59%	3,881
Arenac	1,280	39.13%	1,978	60.47%	7	0.21%	2	0.06%	4	0.12%	-698	-21.34%	3,271
Baraga	1,874	50.46%	1,829	49.25%	3	0.08%	7	0.19%	1	0.03%	45	1.21%	3,714
Barry	3,010	29.50%	7,057	69.17%	123	1.21%	6	0.06%	7	0.07%	-4,047	-39.66%	10,203
Bay	15,602	50.00%	15,459	49.54%	17	0.05%	78	0.25%	48	0.15%	143	0.46%	31,204
Benzie	1,084	34.50%	2,026	64.48%	19	0.60%	11	0.35%	2	0.06%	-942	-29.98%	3,142
Berrien	15,886	38.81%	24,832	60.66%	79	0.19%	101	0.25%	36	0.09%	-8,946	-21.85%	40,934
Branch	3,406	32.10%	7,155	67.44%	36	0.34%	11	0.10%	1	0.01%	-3,749	-35.34%	10,609
Calhoun	16,611	44.07%	20,664	54.82%	303	0.80%	99	0.26%	16	0.04%	-4,053	-10.75%	37,693
Cass	3,417	34.00%	6,566	65.33%	32	0.32%	20	0.20%	16	0.16%	-3,149	-31.33%	10,051
Charlevoix	1,893	38.06%	3,039	61.10%	28	0.56%	9	0.18%	5	0.10%	-1,146	-23.04%	4,974
Cheboygan	2,141	41.83%	2,943	57.50%	24	0.47%	4	0.08%	6	0.12%	-802	-15.67%	5,118
Chippewa	4,344	44.67%	5,335	54.86%	32	0.33%	6	0.06%	8	0.08%	-991	-10.19%	9,725
Clare	1,078	28.86%	2,636	70.58%	11	0.29%	6	0.16%	4	0.11%	-1,558	-41.71%	3,735
Clinton	2,533	23.06%	8,422	76.68%	20	0.18%	5	0.05%	4	0.04%	-5,889	-53.61%	10,984
Crawford	550	40.59%	797	58.82%	3	0.22%	4	0.30%	1	0.07%	-247	-18.23%	1,355
Delta	7,375	58.33%	5,213	41.23%	16	0.13%	27	0.21%	13	0.10%	2,162	17.10%	12,644
Dickinson	6,740	56.92%	4,987	42.11%	44	0.37%	44	0.37%	27	0.23%	1,753	14.80%	11,842
Eaton	5,049	33.35%	9,975	65.89%	85	0.56%	29	0.19%	2	0.01%	-4,926	-32.54%	15,140
Emmet	2,206	38.15%	3,538	61.19%	22	0.38%	14	0.24%	2	0.03%	-1,332	-23.04%	5,782
Genesee	52,445	55.72%	41,145	43.72%	218	0.23%	241	0.26%	68	0.07%	11,300	12.01%	94,117
Gladwin	985	28.44%	2,457	70.93%	12	0.35%	1	0.03%	9	0.26%	-1,472	-42.49%	3,464
Gogebic	7,938	59.83%	5,283	39.82%	14	0.11%	24	0.18%	9	0.07%	2,655	20.01%	13,268
Grand Traverse	2,607	32.28%	5,413	67.03%	37	0.46%	10	0.12%	8	0.10%	-2,806	-34.75%	8,075
Gratiot	3,160	28.10%	7,987	71.03%	87	0.77%	7	0.06%	3	0.03%	-4,827	-42.93%	11,244
Hillsdale	3,153	25.03%	9,364	74.33%	62	0.49%	16	0.13%	3	0.02%	-6,211	-49.30%	12,598
Houghton	10,066	52.32%	9,110	47.35%	29	0.15%	17	0.09%	16	0.08%	956	4.97%	19,238
Huron	2,301	19.34%	9,538	80.16%	21	0.18%	21	0.18%	17	0.14%	-7,237	-60.83%	11,898
Ingham	23,655	40.57%	34,255	58.74%	226	0.39%	137	0.23%	40	0.07%	-10,600	-18.18%	58,313
Ionia	4,437	31.89%	9,331	67.06%	120	0.86%	18	0.13%	8	0.06%	-4,894	-35.17%	13,914
Iosco	1,127	32.39%	2,340	67.26%	5	0.14%	4	0.11%	3	0.09%	-1,213	-34.87%	3,479
Iron	4,537	53.09%	3,945	46.16%	32	0.37%	23	0.27%	9	0.11%	592	6.93%	8,546
Isabella	2,522	28.18%	6,356	71.02%	52	0.58%	12	0.13%	7	0.08%	-3,834	-42.84%	8,949
Jackson	13,859	37.36%	22,992	61.97%	182	0.49%	41	0.11%	26	0.07%	-9,133	-24.62%	37,100
Kalamazoo	16,223	38.95%	24,974	59.96%	274	0.66%	137	0.33%	46	0.11%	-8,751	-21.01%	41,654
Kalkaska	409	28.97%	992	70.25%	10	0.71%	1	0.07%	0	0.00%	-583	-41.29%	1,412
Kent	43,679	44.07%	54,163	54.65%	1,121	1.13%	110	0.11%	43	0.04%	-10,484	-10.58%	99,116
Keweenaw	965	52.53%	866	47.14%	2	0.11%	2	0.11%	2	0.11%	99	5.39%	1,837
Lake	794	40.80%	1,145	58.84%	4	0.21%	2	0.10%	1	0.05%	-351	-18.04%	1,946
Lapeer	3,002	27.74%	7,769	71.80%	28	0.26%	11	0.10%	11	0.10%	-4,767	-44.05%	10,821
Leelanau	944	31.23%	2,063	68.24%	4	0.13%	10	0.33%	2	0.07%	-1,119	-37.02%	3,023
Lenawee	6,750	29.04%	16,382	70.48%	69	0.30%	18	0.08%	24	0.10%	-9,632	-41.44%	23,243
Livingston	2,910	28.01%	7,417	71.38%	44	0.42%	9	0.09%	11	0.11%	-4,507	-43.37%	10,391
Luce	790	39.64%	1,195	59.96%	4	0.20%	3	0.15%	1	0.05%	-405	-20.32%	1,993
Mackinac	1,488	39.41%	2,268	60.06%	10	0.26%	5	0.13%	5	0.13%	-780	-20.66%	3,776
Macomb	23,506	52.08%	21,305	47.20%	106	0.23%	115	0.25%	103	0.23%	2,201	4.88%	45,135
Manistee	3,398	45.13%	4,095	54.38%	12	0.16%	20	0.27%	5	0.07%	-697	-9.26%	7,530
Marquette	11,707	58.70%	8,163	40.93%	27	0.14%	26	0.13%	21	0.11%	3,544	17.77%	19,944
Mason	3,137	41.11%	4,446	58.27%	25	0.33%	14	0.18%	8	0.10%	-1,309	-17.16%	7,630
Mecosta	1,708	28.49%	4,217	70.34%	48	0.80%	8	0.13%	14	0.23%	-2,509	-41.85%	5,995
Menominee	4,632	48.39%	4,869	50.86%	39	0.41%	24	0.25%	9	0.09%	-237	-2.48%	9,573
Midland	3,569	34.05%	6,850	65.35%	28	0.27%	21	0.20%	14	0.13%	-3,281	-31.30%	10,482
Missaukee	759	27.47%	1,979	71.63%	24	0.87%	1	0.04%	0	0.00%	-1,220	-44.15%	2,763
Monroe	10,275	43.11%	13,478	56.54%	26	0.11%	31	0.13%	26	0.11%	-3,203	-13.44%	23,836
Montcalm	3,168	29.36%	7,525	69.74%	67	0.62%	25	0.23%	5	0.05%	-4,357	-40.38%	10,790
Montmorency	541	34.11%	1,034	65.20%	4	0.25%	5	0.32%	2	0.13%	-493	-31.08%	1,586
Muskegon	19,963	54.27%	16,536	44.95%	175	0.48%	67	0.18%	45	0.12%	3,427	9.32%	36,786
Newaygo	2,156	29.00%	5,250	70.62%	20	0.27%	4	0.05%	4	0.05%	-3,094	-41.62%	7,434
Oakland	55,272	47.73%	59,627	51.49%	292	0.25%	333	0.29%	289	0.25%	-4,355	-3.76%	115,813
Oceana	1,738	32.58%	3,534	66.24%	50	0.94%	8	0.15%	5	0.09%	-1,796	-33.66%	5,335
Ogemaw	1,006	29.91%	2,339	69.55%	4	0.12%	10	0.30%	4	0.12%	-1,333	-39.64%	3,363
Ontonagon	2,611	51.59%	2,433	48.07%	6	0.12%	5	0.10%	6	0.12%	178	3.52%	5,061
Osceola	1,338	25.84%	3,787	73.14%	43	0.83%	5	0.10%	5	0.10%	-2,449	-47.30%	5,178
Oscoda	332	34.95%	615	64.74%	1	0.11%	1	0.11%	1	0.11%	-283	-29.79%	950
Otsego	912	41.80%	1,259	57.70%	7	0.32%	3	0.14%	1	0.05%	-347	-15.90%	2,182
Ottawa	8,511	33.01%	17,077	66.23%	113	0.44%	65	0.25%	20	0.08%	-8,566	-33.22%	25,786
Presque Isle	2,092	48.49%	2,209	51.21%	3	0.07%	4	0.09%	6	0.14%	-117	-2.71%	4,314
Roscommon	484	27.05%	1,292	72.22%	6	0.34%	5	0.28%	2	0.11%	-808	-45.16%	1,789
Saginaw	20,383	42.11%	27,289	56.38%	590	1.22%	86	0.18%	54	0.11%	-6,906	-14.27%	48,402
Sanilac	2,015	17.39%	9,512	82.09%	34	0.29%	13	0.11%	13	0.11%	-7,497	-64.70%	11,587
Schoolcraft	1,724	50.01%	1,704	49.43%	11	0.32%	7	0.20%	1	0.03%	20	0.58%	3,447
Shiawassee	5,292	31.21%	11,601	68.41%	32	0.19%	26	0.15%	6	0.04%	-6,309	-37.21%	16,957
St. Clair	11,813	37.96%	19,175	61.61%	77	0.25%	38	0.12%	20	0.06%	-7,362	-23.65%	31,123
St. Joseph	4,235	30.06%	9,785	69.45%	43	0.31%	20	0.14%	6	0.04%	-5,550	-39.39%	14,089
Tuscola	2,938	22.98%	9,789	76.55%	41	0.32%	12	0.09%	7	0.05%	-6,851	-53.58%	12,787
Van Buren	5,002	31.19%	10,951	68.29%	38	0.24%	33	0.21%	13	0.08%	-5,949	-37.10%	16,037
Washtenaw	14,922	37.39%	24,740	62.00%	93	0.23%	118	0.30%	33	0.08%	-9,818	-24.60%	39,906
Wayne	554,670	63.38%	316,270	36.14%	650	0.07%	2,051	0.23%	1,452	0.17%	238,400	27.24%	875,093
Wexford	2,489	37.39%	4,074	61.21%	83	1.25%	9	0.14%	1	0.02%	-1,585	-23.81%	6,656
Totals	1,106,899	50.19%	1,084,423	49.18%	6,503	0.29%	4,598	0.21%	2,800	0.13%	22,476	1.02%	2,205,223

==== Counties that flipped from Republican to Democratic ====
- Baraga
- Houghton
- Keweenaw

==== Counties that flipped from Democratic to Republican ====
- Memominee
- Presque Isle

== See also ==
- United States presidential elections in Michigan
