= 1944 United States presidential election in Minnesota =

- November 7, 1944

Nominee	Franklin D. Roosevelt	Thomas E. Dewey
Party	Democratic (DFL)	Republican
Home state	New York	New York
Running mate	Harry S. Truman	John W. Bricker
Electoral vote	11	0
Popular vote	589,864	527,416
Percentage	52.41%	46.86%
County results
Roosevelt
40–50%
50–60%
60–70%
70–80%
Dewey
50–60%
60–70%
70–80%
President before election
Franklin D. Roosevelt
Democratic
Elected President
Franklin D. Roosevelt
Democratic

The 1944 United States presidential election in Minnesota took place on November 7, 1944, as part of the 1944 United States presidential election. Voters chose 11 electors, or representatives to the Electoral College, who voted for president and vice president.

Minnesota was won by the Democratic candidate, incumbent President Franklin D. Roosevelt won the state over New York Governor Thomas E. Dewey by a margin of 62,448 votes or 5.55%. Minnesota was one of six states that shifted left from 1940, alongside Illinois, Michigan, New York, North Dakota, and Rhode Island.

== Results ==
1944 United States presidential election in Minnesota
Party	Candidate	Votes	Percentage	Electoral votes
Democratic (DFL)	Franklin D. Roosevelt (incumbent)	589,864	52.41%	11
Republican	Thomas E. Dewey	527,416	46.86%	0
Socialist	Norman Thomas	5,073	0.45%	0
Industrial Government	Edward A. Teichert	3,176	0.28%	0
Totals		1,125,529	100.00%	11

=== Results by county ===
County	Franklin D. Roosevelt DFL		Thomas E. Dewey Republican		Norman Thomas Socialist		Edward A. Teichert Industrial Government		Margin		Total votes cast
County	#	%	#	%	#	%	#	%	#	%	Total votes cast
Aitkin	2,743	49.79%	2,720	49.37%	35	0.64%	11	0.20%	23	0.42%	5,509
Anoka	5,431	57.36%	3,958	41.80%	71	0.75%	8	0.08%	1,473	15.56%	9,468
Becker	4,889	55.87%	3,803	43.46%	46	0.53%	12	0.14%	1,086	12.41%	8,750
Beltrami	5,490	66.50%	2,705	32.76%	41	0.50%	20	0.24%	2,785	33.73%	8,256
Benton	2,258	42.90%	2,988	56.76%	11	0.21%	7	0.13%	-730	-13.87%	5,264
Big Stone	2,120	56.50%	1,608	42.86%	14	0.37%	10	0.27%	512	13.65%	3,752
Blue Earth	5,098	34.96%	9,429	64.67%	29	0.20%	25	0.17%	-4,331	-29.70%	14,581
Brown	2,842	28.57%	7,018	70.54%	67	0.67%	22	0.22%	-4,176	-41.97%	9,949
Carlton	6,153	69.48%	2,653	29.96%	39	0.44%	11	0.12%	3,500	39.52%	8,856
Carver	1,565	21.06%	5,828	78.42%	28	0.38%	11	0.15%	-4,263	-57.36%	7,432
Cass	3,377	51.58%	3,135	47.88%	27	0.41%	8	0.12%	242	3.70%	6,547
Chippewa	3,264	51.98%	2,967	47.25%	30	0.48%	18	0.29%	297	4.73%	6,279
Chisago	2,376	43.72%	3,020	55.58%	29	0.53%	9	0.17%	-644	-11.85%	5,434
Clay	5,230	54.06%	4,392	45.40%	34	0.35%	18	0.19%	838	8.66%	9,674
Clearwater	2,658	69.58%	1,125	29.45%	28	0.73%	9	0.24%	1,533	40.13%	3,820
Cook	545	51.13%	513	48.12%	8	0.75%	0	0.00%	32	3.00%	1,066
Cottonwood	2,354	37.32%	3,916	62.08%	20	0.32%	18	0.29%	-1,562	-24.76%	6,308
Crow Wing	5,504	54.67%	4,500	44.70%	40	0.40%	23	0.23%	1,004	9.97%	10,067
Dakota	8,562	52.20%	7,731	47.13%	67	0.41%	43	0.26%	831	5.07%	16,403
Dodge	1,808	38.26%	2,902	61.42%	9	0.19%	6	0.13%	-1,094	-23.15%	4,725
Douglas	3,681	46.79%	4,140	52.62%	34	0.43%	12	0.15%	-459	-5.83%	7,867
Faribault	3,640	38.37%	5,822	61.37%	15	0.16%	10	0.11%	-2,182	-23.00%	9,487
Fillmore	3,183	33.29%	6,339	66.29%	27	0.28%	13	0.14%	-3,156	-33.01%	9,562
Freeborn	6,486	52.96%	5,728	46.77%	20	0.16%	12	0.10%	758	6.19%	12,246
Goodhue	5,791	42.33%	7,820	57.17%	55	0.40%	13	0.10%	-2,029	-14.83%	13,679
Grant	1,969	50.76%	1,898	48.93%	5	0.13%	7	0.18%	71	1.83%	3,879
Hennepin	148,792	55.66%	116,781	43.69%	1,368	0.51%	379	0.14%	32,011	11.97%	267,320
Houston	1,847	31.26%	4,036	68.31%	17	0.29%	8	0.14%	-2,189	-37.05%	5,908
Hubbard	1,613	43.13%	2,114	56.52%	10	0.27%	3	0.08%	-501	-13.40%	3,740
Isanti	2,225	49.59%	2,205	49.14%	53	1.18%	4	0.09%	20	0.45%	4,487
Itasca	8,787	67.10%	4,227	32.28%	60	0.46%	21	0.16%	4,560	34.82%	13,095
Jackson	3,417	54.85%	2,789	44.77%	9	0.14%	15	0.24%	628	10.08%	6,230
Kanabec	1,776	47.83%	1,913	51.52%	22	0.59%	2	0.05%	-137	-3.69%	3,713
Kandiyohi	6,482	62.61%	3,784	36.55%	70	0.68%	17	0.16%	2,698	26.06%	10,353
Kittson	2,752	73.25%	983	26.16%	19	0.51%	3	0.08%	1,769	47.09%	3,757
Koochiching	3,981	70.60%	1,607	28.50%	36	0.64%	15	0.27%	2,374	42.10%	5,639
Lac qui Parle	2,779	47.10%	3,104	52.61%	10	0.17%	7	0.12%	-325	-5.51%	5,900
Lake	2,401	74.13%	792	24.45%	40	1.23%	6	0.19%	1,609	49.68%	3,239
Lake of the Woods	1,168	64.49%	642	35.45%	1	0.06%	0	0.00%	526	29.04%	1,811
Le Sueur	3,358	42.15%	4,560	57.24%	28	0.35%	21	0.26%	-1,202	-15.09%	7,967
Lincoln	2,302	58.77%	1,600	40.85%	11	0.28%	4	0.10%	702	17.92%	3,917
Lyon	4,640	55.94%	3,617	43.60%	18	0.22%	20	0.24%	1,023	12.33%	8,295
Mahnomen	1,494	66.11%	748	33.10%	12	0.53%	6	0.27%	746	33.01%	2,260
Marshall	3,808	64.94%	2,029	34.60%	16	0.27%	11	0.19%	1,779	30.34%	5,864
Martin	4,443	46.02%	5,182	53.68%	20	0.21%	9	0.09%	-739	-7.65%	9,654
McLeod	2,557	30.58%	5,756	68.84%	36	0.43%	12	0.14%	-3,199	-38.26%	8,361
Meeker	3,159	42.09%	4,302	57.31%	34	0.45%	11	0.15%	-1,143	-15.23%	7,506
Mille Lacs	2,872	50.32%	2,798	49.03%	32	0.56%	5	0.09%	74	1.30%	5,707
Morrison	3,920	43.55%	5,035	55.93%	33	0.37%	14	0.16%	-1,115	-12.39%	9,002
Mower	7,199	52.03%	6,588	47.62%	29	0.21%	19	0.14%	611	4.42%	13,835
Murray	2,495	48.90%	2,585	50.67%	16	0.31%	6	0.12%	-90	-1.76%	5,102
Nicollet	2,321	34.63%	4,345	64.83%	23	0.34%	13	0.19%	-2,024	-30.20%	6,702
Nobles	3,413	44.93%	4,149	54.61%	24	0.32%	11	0.14%	-736	-9.69%	7,597
Norman	2,846	59.69%	1,884	39.51%	28	0.59%	10	0.21%	962	20.18%	4,768
Olmsted	6,873	45.00%	8,355	54.70%	28	0.18%	18	0.12%	-1,482	-9.70%	15,274
Otter Tail	5,823	31.85%	12,351	67.55%	78	0.43%	32	0.18%	-6,528	-35.70%	18,284
Pennington	3,330	67.89%	1,525	31.09%	41	0.84%	9	0.18%	1,805	36.80%	4,905
Pine	4,332	55.33%	3,433	43.85%	46	0.59%	18	0.23%	899	11.48%	7,829
Pipestone	2,129	42.63%	2,844	56.95%	15	0.30%	6	0.12%	-715	-14.32%	4,994
Polk	8,808	66.18%	4,402	33.07%	81	0.61%	19	0.14%	4,406	33.10%	13,310
Pope	2,781	51.49%	2,607	48.27%	4	0.07%	9	0.17%	174	3.22%	5,401
Ramsey	78,759	58.89%	53,052	39.67%	870	0.65%	1,063	0.79%	25,707	19.22%	133,744
Red Lake	1,642	68.02%	757	31.36%	12	0.50%	3	0.12%	885	36.66%	2,414
Redwood	2,886	34.59%	5,428	65.06%	16	0.19%	13	0.16%	-2,542	-30.47%	8,343
Renville	3,747	41.74%	5,160	57.49%	49	0.55%	20	0.22%	-1,413	-15.74%	8,976
Rice	4,470	39.48%	6,824	60.27%	18	0.16%	10	0.09%	-2,354	-20.79%	11,322
Rock	1,649	38.71%	2,584	60.66%	20	0.47%	7	0.16%	-935	-21.95%	4,260
Roseau	3,697	70.42%	1,513	28.82%	30	0.57%	10	0.19%	2,184	41.60%	5,250
Saint Louis	63,369	68.92%	27,493	29.90%	420	0.46%	660	0.72%	35,876	39.02%	91,942
Scott	2,786	45.30%	3,326	54.08%	16	0.26%	22	0.36%	-540	-8.78%	6,150
Sherburne	1,447	41.13%	2,046	58.16%	19	0.54%	6	0.17%	-599	-17.03%	3,518
Sibley	1,683	27.94%	4,311	71.56%	15	0.25%	15	0.25%	-2,628	-43.63%	6,024
Stearns	8,647	39.25%	13,298	60.37%	55	0.25%	29	0.13%	-4,651	-21.11%	22,029
Steele	3,307	40.92%	4,760	58.90%	10	0.12%	5	0.06%	-1,453	-17.98%	8,082
Stevens	1,693	41.47%	2,377	58.23%	7	0.17%	5	0.12%	-684	-16.76%	4,082
Swift	3,310	56.33%	2,519	42.87%	31	0.53%	16	0.27%	791	13.46%	5,876
Todd	3,803	40.06%	5,636	59.37%	29	0.31%	25	0.26%	-1,833	-19.31%	9,493
Traverse	1,721	56.78%	1,296	42.76%	11	0.36%	3	0.10%	425	14.02%	3,031
Wabasha	2,482	36.89%	4,213	62.62%	18	0.27%	15	0.22%	-1,731	-25.73%	6,728
Wadena	1,868	41.17%	2,653	58.47%	10	0.22%	6	0.13%	-785	-17.30%	4,537
Waseca	2,207	34.62%	4,146	65.04%	17	0.27%	5	0.08%	-1,939	-30.42%	6,375
Washington	5,599	47.94%	6,014	51.49%	52	0.45%	14	0.12%	-415	-3.55%	11,679
Watonwan	2,324	42.31%	3,146	57.27%	17	0.31%	6	0.11%	-822	-14.96%	5,493
Wilkin	1,819	48.17%	1,945	51.51%	8	0.21%	4	0.11%	-126	-3.34%	3,776
Winona	6,117	42.17%	8,296	57.19%	35	0.24%	58	0.40%	-2,179	-15.02%	14,506
Wright	3,678	34.34%	6,961	64.99%	47	0.44%	25	0.23%	-3,283	-30.65%	10,711
Yellow Medicine	3,214	48.81%	3,337	50.68%	23	0.35%	11	0.17%	-123	-1.87%	6,585
Totals	589,864	52.41%	527,416	46.86%	5,048	0.45%	3,176	0.28%	62,448	5.55%	1,125,504

==== Counties that flipped from Republican to Democratic ====
- Aitkin
- Grant

==== Counties that flipped from Democratic to Republican ====
- Murray
- Wilkin

== See also ==
- United States presidential elections in Minnesota
