= 1944 United States presidential election in Rhode Island =

- November 7, 1944

Nominee	Franklin D. Roosevelt	Thomas E. Dewey
Party	Democratic	Republican
Home state	New York	New York
Running mate	Harry S. Truman	John W. Bricker
Electoral vote	4	0
Popular vote	175,356	123,487
Percentage	58.59%	41.26%

Roosevelt
50–60%
60–70%
70–80%
Dewey
50–60%
60–70%
70–80%
President before election
Franklin D. Roosevelt
Democratic
Elected President
Franklin D. Roosevelt
Democratic

The 1944 United States presidential election in Rhode Island took place on November 7, 1944, as part of the 1944 United States presidential election. State voters chose four electors to the Electoral College, which selected the president and vice president.

Rhode Island voted Democratic candidate, incumbent President Franklin D. Roosevelt of New York, over the Republican candidate, Governor Thomas E. Dewey of New York. Roosevelt ran with Senator Harry S. Truman of Missouri as his running mate, while Dewey ran with Governor John W. Bricker of Ohio as his running mate.

Roosevelt won the state by a margin of 17.33%, which was his best performance in the state of his four runs. Rhode Island was also one of six states that shifted left from 1940, alongside Illinois, Michigan, Minnesota, New York, and North Dakota. This was the first time Kent County voted for a Democratic candidate for president in over 100 years, with the previous instance being for Martin Van Buren in 1836; the latter instance was also the first time in Kent's history that it had voted Democratic for president.

== Results ==
1944 United States presidential election in Rhode Island
Party	Candidate	Running mate	Popular vote		Electoral vote	
Party	Candidate	Running mate	Count	%	Count	%
Democratic	Franklin D. Roosevelt of New York	Harry S. Truman of Missouri	175,356	58.59%	4	100.00%
Republican	Thomas E. Dewey of New York	John W. Bricker of Ohio	123,487	41.26%	0	0.00%
Prohibition	Claude A. Watson of California	Andrew N. Johnson of Kentucky	433	0.14%	0	0.00%
Total			299,276	100.00%	4	100.00%

=== By county ===
1944 United States presidential election in Rhode Island (by county)
County	Franklin D. Roosevelt Democratic		Thomas Dewey Republican		Other candidates Various parties		Margin		Total
County	%	#	%	#	%	#	%	#	#
Bristol	56.0%	6,287	43.8%	4,919	0.1%	16	12.2%	1,368	11,222
Kent	50.5%	14,059	49.3%	13,710	0.2%	57	1.2%	349	27,826
Newport	54.6%	11,375	45.3%	9,435	0.1%	21	9.3%	1,940	20,831
Providence	61.1%	137,216	38.8%	87,190	0.1%	321	22.3%	50,026	224,727
Washington	43.8%	6,419	56.1%	8,233	0.1%	18	-12.3%	-1,814	14,670

== See also ==
- United States presidential elections in Rhode Island
