= 1944 United States presidential election =

Third re-election of Franklin D. Roosevelt

- November 7, 1944

531 members of the Electoral College 266 electoral votes needed to win
- Turnout: 55.9% (▼6.6 pp)

Nominee	Franklin D. Roosevelt	Thomas E. Dewey
Party	Democratic	Republican
Home state	New York	New York
Running mate	Harry S. Truman	John W. Bricker
Electoral vote	432	99
States carried	36	12
Popular vote	25,612,916	22,017,929
Percentage	53.4%	45.9%
- Presidential election results map. Blue denotes those won by Roosevelt/Truman, red denotes states won by Dewey/Bricker. Numbers indicate the number of electoral votes allotted to each state.
President before election
Franklin D. Roosevelt
Democratic
Elected President
Franklin D. Roosevelt
Democratic

A presidential election was held on Tuesday, November 7, 1944. The election took place during World War II, which ended the following year. The Democratic ticket of incumbent President Franklin D. Roosevelt and Senator Harry Truman defeated the Republican ticket of New York Governor Thomas E. Dewey and Ohio Governor John Bricker, to win an unprecedented fourth term. It was also the fifth presidential election in which both major party candidates were registered in the same home state; the others have been in 1860, 1904, 1920, 1940, and 2016. Though the margin of victory was still a landslide, this was Roosevelt's weakest performance in his four elections, and the popular vote split was less lopsided.

Roosevelt had become the first president to win a third term with his victory in the 1940 presidential election, with little doubt that he would seek a fourth term. Unlike in 1940, Roosevelt faced little opposition within his own party, and he easily won the presidential nomination of the 1944 Democratic National Convention. Concerned that Roosevelt's ill health would mean the vice president would likely become president, the convention dropped Roosevelt's vice president Henry A. Wallace in favor of the lesser known Senator Harry S. Truman of Missouri. Governor Dewey of New York emerged as the front-runner for the Republican nomination after his victory in the Wisconsin primary, and he defeated conservative Governor John W. Bricker at the 1944 Republican National Convention.

As World War II was going well for the United States and the Allies, Roosevelt remained popular despite his long tenure. Dewey campaigned against the New Deal and for a smaller government but was ultimately unsuccessful in convincing the country to change course. The election was closer than Roosevelt's other presidential campaigns, but Roosevelt still won by a 7.5 percentage point margin in the popular vote and by a wide margin in the Electoral College. Rumors of Roosevelt's ill health, although somewhat dispelled by his vigorous campaigning, proved to be true; Roosevelt died less than three months into his fourth term and was succeeded by Truman. Roosevelt would be the last major party candidate to have been nominated by their party for three or more consecutive presidential elections until Donald Trump in 2024. (Note: Before Trump, Richard Nixon was the Republican Party nominee thrice, but in nonconsecutive elections: 1960, 1968, and 1972.)

== Nominations ==
=== Democratic Party nomination ===
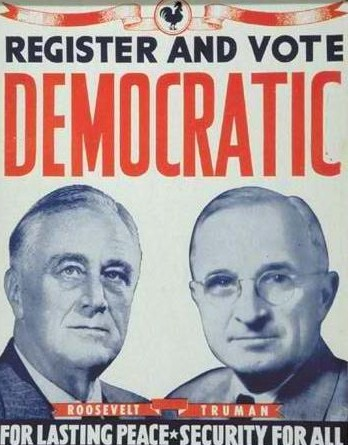
Roosevelt/Truman poster

Democratic Party (United States) 1944 Democratic Party ticket
Franklin D. Roosevelt	Harry S. Truman
for President	for Vice President
32nd President of the United States (1933–1945)	U.S. Senator from Missouri (1935–1945)

In order of delegates and votes won
Franklin D. Roosevelt	Harry F. Byrd	James Farley	Joseph T. Ferguson	Fred H. Hildebrandt	Cordell Hull	Paul V. McNutt
U.S. President from New York (1933–1945)	U.S. Senator from Virginia (1933–1965)	U.S. Postmaster General from New York (1933–1940)	State Auditor from Ohio (1936–1940)	U.S. Representative from South Dakota (1933–1939)	United States Secretary of State from Tennessee (1933–1944)	High Commissioner to the Philippines from Indiana (1937–1939)
1,324,006 votes 1,086 PD	109,000 votes 89 PD	76,919 votes 1 PD	0 PD	0 PD	0 PD	0 PD

Convention vote
President		Vice President	
✓ Franklin D. Roosevelt	1,086	✓ Harry S. Truman	626
Harry F. Byrd	89	Henry A. Wallace	329
James Farley	1	Prentice Cooper	26
		Scattering/Other	7
		Alben W. Barkley	6
		Paul V. McNutt	1
		John H. Bankhead II	0
		Scott W. Lucas	0
		J. Melville Broughton	0

President Roosevelt was the popular, wartime incumbent and faced little formal opposition. Although many Southern Democrats mistrusted Roosevelt's racial policies, he brought enormous war activities to the region and the end of its marginal status was in sight. No major figure opposed Roosevelt publicly, and he was re-nominated easily when the Democratic Convention met in Chicago. Some pro-segregationist delegates tried to unite behind Virginia senator Harry F. Byrd, but he refused to campaign actively against Roosevelt, and did not get enough delegates to seriously threaten the President's chances.

The obvious physical decline in the president's appearance, as well as rumors of secret health problems, led many delegates and party leaders to strongly oppose Vice President Henry A. Wallace for a second term. Opposition to Wallace came especially from Catholic leaders in big cities and moderate Democrats. Wallace, who had been Roosevelt's vice president since January 1941, was regarded by most conservatives as being too left-wing and personally eccentric to be next in line for the presidency. He had performed so poorly as economic coordinator that Roosevelt had to remove him from that post. Numerous moderate party leaders privately sent word to Roosevelt that they would fight Wallace's re-nomination as vice president and proposed instead Senator Harry S. Truman, a moderate from Missouri. Truman was highly visible as the chairman of a Senate wartime committee investigating fraud and inefficiency in the war program. Roosevelt, who personally liked Wallace and knew little about Truman, agreed reluctantly to accept Truman as his running mate to preserve party unity. Even so, many delegates on the left refused to abandon Wallace, and they voted for him on the first ballot. However, enough large Northern, Midwestern, and Southern states supported Truman to give him victory on the second ballot. The fight over the vice-presidential nomination proved to be consequential; the ticket won and Roosevelt died in April 1945, and Truman instead of Wallace became the nation's thirty-third president.

=== Republican Party ===
Republican Party (United States) 1944 Republican Party ticket
Thomas E. Dewey	John W. Bricker
for President	for Vice President
47th Governor of New York (1943–1954)	54th Governor of Ohio (1939–1945)

In order of delegates and votes won
Thomas E. Dewey	Douglas MacArthur	Earl Warren	John W. Bricker	Harold Stassen	Wendell Willkie	Charles A. Christopherson	Everett Dirksen	Chapman Revercomb
Governor of New York (1943–1954)	General from Arkansas (1918–1951)	Governor of California (1943–1953)	Governor of Ohio (1943–1953)	Former Governor of Minnesota (1939–1943)	Businessman from New York	Representative from South Dakota	Representative from Illinois	U.S. Senator from West Virginia (1943–1949; 1956–1959)
278,272 votes 1,056 PD	662,127 votes 1 PD	594,439 votes	366,444 votes	67,508 votes	0 votes 0 PD	0 votes 0 PD	0 votes 0 PD	0 votes 0 PD

Convention vote
President		Vice President	
✓ Thomas E. Dewey	1,056	✓ John W. Bricker	1,057
Douglas MacArthur	1	Abstaining	2

As 1944 began, the frontrunners for the Republican nomination appeared to be Wendell Willkie, the party's 1940 dark horse nominee, Senator Robert A. Taft from Ohio, the leader of the party's conservatives, New York Governor Thomas E. Dewey, the leader of the party's moderate eastern establishment, General Douglas MacArthur, then serving as an Allied commander in the Pacific theater of the war, and former Minnesota Governor Harold Stassen, then serving as a U.S. naval officer in the Pacific. Taft surprised many by declining to run for president as he wanted to remain in the Senate; instead, he voiced his support for a fellow Ohio conservative, Governor John W. Bricker.

With Taft out of the race some Republican conservatives favored General MacArthur. However, MacArthur's chances were limited by the fact that he was leading Allied forces against Japan, and thus could not campaign for the nomination. His supporters entered his name in the Wisconsin primary nonetheless. The Wisconsin primary proved to be the key contest, as Dewey won by a surprisingly wide margin. He took fourteen delegates to four for Harold Stassen, while MacArthur won the three remaining delegates. Willkie was shut out in the Wisconsin primary; he did not win a single delegate. His unexpectedly poor showing in Wisconsin forced him to withdraw as a candidate for the nomination. However, at the time of his sudden death in early October 1944, Willkie had endorsed neither Dewey nor Roosevelt. At the 1944 Republican National Convention in Chicago, Dewey easily overcame Bricker and was nominated for president on the first ballot. Dewey, a moderate to liberal Republican, chose the conservative Bricker as his running mate. Dewey originally preferred fellow liberal California Governor Earl Warren, but agreed on Bricker to preserve party unity (Warren would go on to run with Dewey in the 1948 election). Bricker was nominated for vice president by acclamation.

== General election ==
=== Polling ===
Polling aggregates
Candidates
Franklin Roosevelt
Thomas Dewey
Undecided

Poll source	Field date(s)	Sample size	Franklin Roosevelt Democratic	Thomas Dewey Republican	Others	Undecided	Leading by (points)
Election results	November 7, 1944		53.4%	45.9%	0.7%	-	7.5
Fortune	November 5, 1944		50.9%	44.1%	-	5.0%	~7
Gallup Poll News Service	November 3, 1944	3,085 (A)	46.5%	45.6%	0.4%	7.6%	0.9
Fortune	October 20, 1944		?	?	-	?	7.0
Gallup Poll News Service	October 17, 1944	2,404 (A)	47.8%	42.5%	0.3%	9.5%	5.2
Gallup Poll News Service	October 12, 1944	2,743 (A)	46.1%	43.1%	0.4%	10.3%	3.0
Gallup Poll News Service	October 6, 1944	2,616 (A)	48.6%	40.0%	0.3%	11.1%	8.6
Gallup Poll News Service	October 3, 1944	2,601 (A)	44.2%	44.4%	0.4%	9.8%	0.2
Gallup Poll News Service	September 20, 1944	2,988 (A)	47.0%	43.2%	-	9.8%	3.9
Gallup Poll News Service	September 14, 1944	2,917 (A)	48.6%	40.7%	0.7%	10.1%	7.8
Fortune	September 14, 1944		49.3%	44.4%	-	6.3%	4.9
Gallup Poll News Service	September 6, 1944	615 (A)	44.6%	34.6%	-	20.8%	9.9
Gallup Poll News Service	August 29, 1944	3,021 (A)	46.4%	42.3%	-	11.3%	4.1
Gallup Poll News Service	August 16, 1944	1,171 (A)	48.8%	38.2%	-	13.1%	10.6
Fortune	August 16, 1944		52.5%	43.9%	-	3.6%	8.6
Gallup Poll News Service	August 1, 1944	1,231 (A)	46.8%	41.7%	-	11.5%	5.1
Fortune	July 20, 1944		50.8%	42.2%	-	7.0%	8.6
Gallup Poll News Service	July 18, 1944	3,020 (A)	49.5%	41.0%	-	9.6%	8.5
Gallup Poll News Service	June 20, 1944	2,910 (A)	51.0%	43.5%	-	5.5%	7.5
Gallup Poll News Service	June 7, 1944	2,718 (A)	50.6%	45.1%	-	4.3%	5.4
Gallup Poll News Service	May 23, 1944	3,009 (A)	50.3%	44.7%	-	5.0%	5.6
Gallup Poll News Service	May 9, 1944	2,631 (A)	51.2%	42.9%	-	5.9%	8.3
Gallup Poll News Service	April 25, 1944	1,566 (A)	48.0%	46.2%	-	5.8%	1.9
Gallup Poll News Service	March 29, 1944	2,982 (A)	51.2%	41.2%	-	7.6%	10.1
Gallup Poll News Service	March 15, 1944	1,400 (A)	53.4%	42.4%	-	4.2%	11.0
Gallup Poll News Service	March 1, 1944	1,643 (A)	53.1%	42.2%	-	4.7%	11.0
Gallup Poll News Service	February 1, 1944	2,980 (A)	48.8% (Note: With Henry Wallace)	44.6% (Note: With Douglas MacArthur)	-	6.6%	4.2
Gallup Poll News Service	January 4, 1944	3,006 (A)	54.3%	37.3%	-	8.4%	17.0
Gallup Poll News Service	November 9, 1943	3,026 (A)	53.9%	39.9%	-	6.2%	14.0
Gallup Poll News Service	October 26, 1943	2,918 (A)	48.5% (Note: With Henry Wallace)	43.4% (Note: With Douglas MacArthur)	-	8.1%	5.1
Gallup Poll News Service	September 14, 1943	2,645 (A)	58.0%	33.7%	-	8.3%	24.3
Gallup Poll News Service	July 7, 1943	3,033 (A)	52.3%	38.3%	-	9.5%	14.0
Gallup Poll News Service	June 2, 1943	1,442 (A)	51.9% (Note: With Henry Wallace)	40.2% (Note: With Douglas MacArthur)	-	7.9%	11.8
Gallup Poll News Service	May 12, 1943	1,497 (A)	47.1% (Note: With Henry Wallace)	36.3% (Note: With Douglas MacArthur)	-	16.6%	10.8
Gallup Poll News Service	April 27, 1943	1,486 (A)	51.6% (Note: With Henry Wallace)	36.8% (Note: With Douglas MacArthur)	-	11.6%	14.7
Gallup Poll News Service	January 7, 1943	2,808 (A)	49.7%	32.7%	-	17.6%	17.0
Gallup Poll News Service	December 15, 1942	1,380 (A)	41.1%	35.8%	-	23.1%	5.3

=== Fall campaign ===
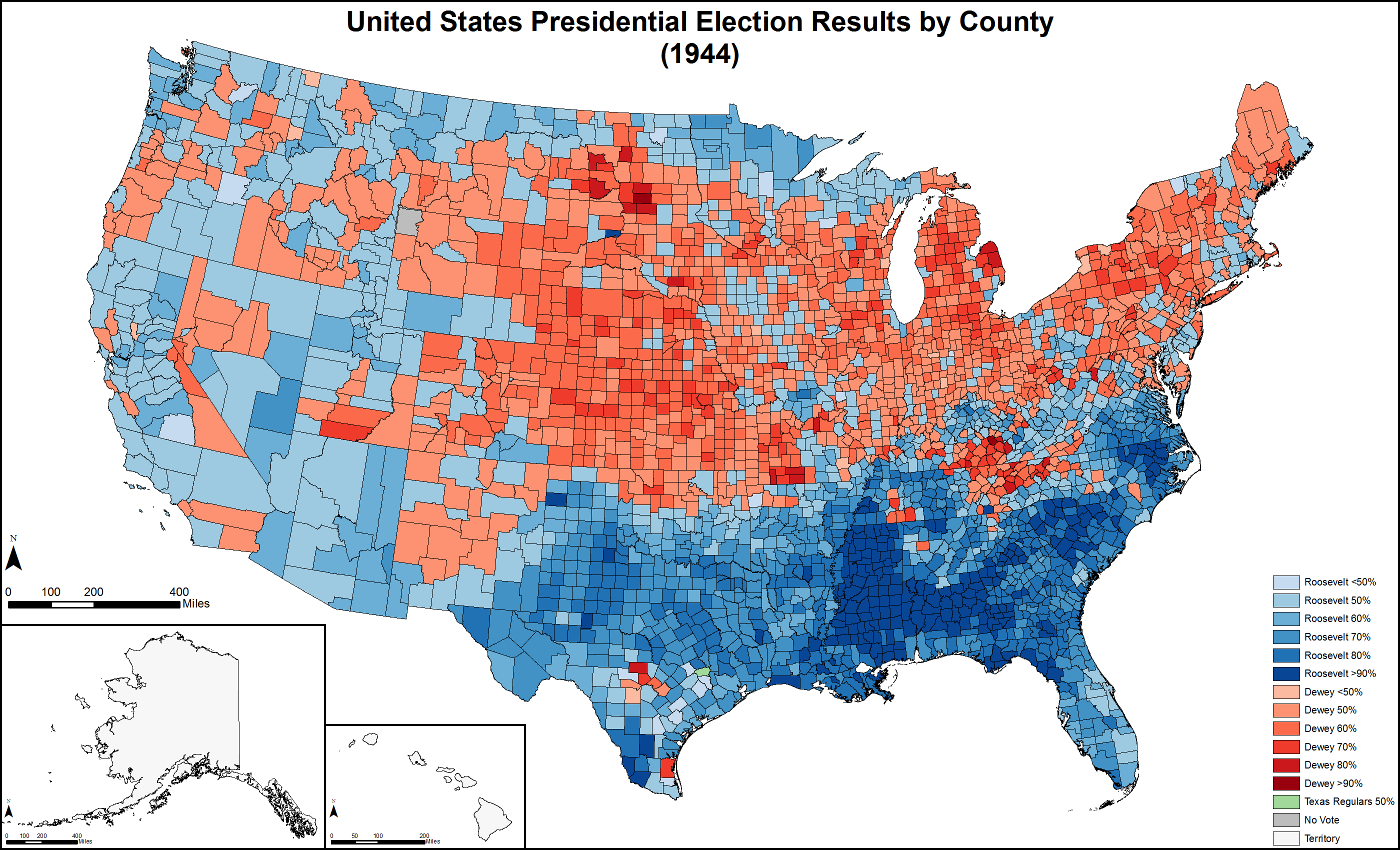
Results by county explicitly indicating the percentage for the winning candidate. Shades of blue are for Roosevelt (Democratic), shades of red are for Dewey (Republican), and shades of green are for "No Candidate" (Texas Regulars).

The Republicans campaigned against the New Deal, seeking a smaller government and less-regulated economy as the end of the war seemed in sight. Nonetheless, Roosevelt's continuing popularity was the main theme of the campaign. To quiet rumors of his poor health, Roosevelt insisted on making a vigorous campaign swing in October and rode in an open car through city streets.

Numerous campaign songs for F.D.R. were written, possibly in an effort to advertise on radio during radio's Golden Age. These included 1940's "Franklin D. Roosevelt's Back Again" and "Mister Roosevelt, Won't You Please Run Again." In 1944, Broadway actress Mary Crane Hone published piano march "Let's Re-Re-Re-Elect Roosevelt." Its lyrics were:

Let's make each one of our blows felt

For the causes of humanity and war.

With world peace just around the corner,

His leadership is necessary still.

So - Let's Re-Re-Re-Elect Roosevelt...

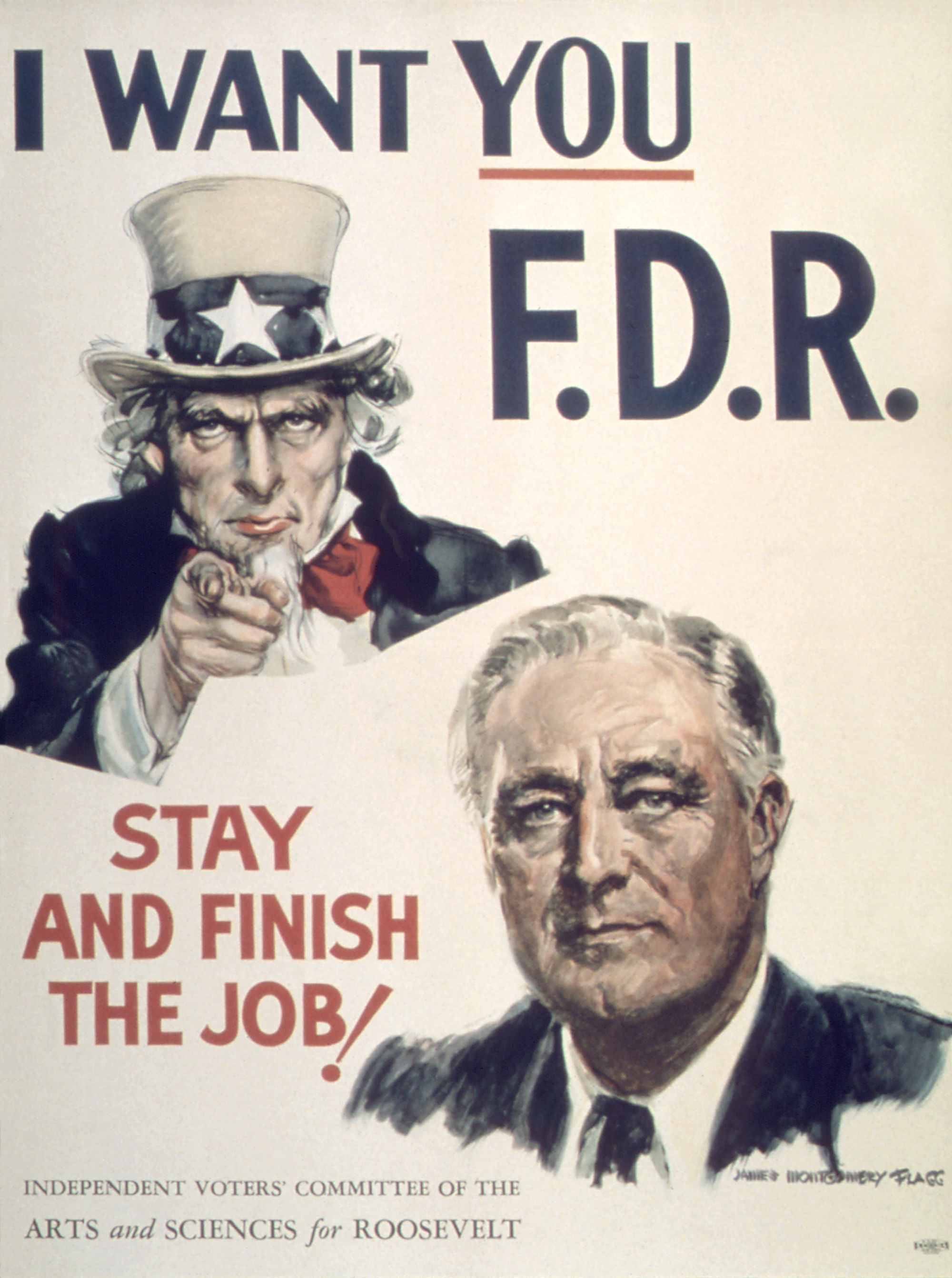
Poster from 1944 presidential campaign

A high point of the campaign occurred when Roosevelt, speaking to a meeting of labor union leaders, gave a speech carried on national radio in which he ridiculed Republican claims that his administration was corrupt and wasteful with tax money. He particularly derided a Republican claim that he had sent a US Navy warship to pick up his Scottish Terrier Fala in Alaska, noting that "Fala was furious" at such rumors. The speech was met with loud laughter and applause from the labor leaders. In response, Governor Dewey gave a blistering partisan speech in Oklahoma City a few days later on national radio, in which he accused Roosevelt of being "indispensable" to corrupt big-city Democratic organizations and American Communists; he also referred to members of Roosevelt's cabinet as a "motley crew". However, American battlefield successes in Europe and the Pacific during the campaign, such as the liberation of Paris in August 1944 and the successful Battle of Leyte Gulf in the Philippines in October 1944, made President Roosevelt unbeatable.

=== Results ===
Throughout the campaign, Roosevelt led Dewey in all the polls by varying margins. On election day, the Democratic incumbent scored a fairly comfortable victory over his Republican challenger. Roosevelt took 36 states for 432 electoral votes (266 were needed to win), while Dewey won twelve states and 99 electoral votes. In the popular vote, Roosevelt won 25,612,916 (53.4%) votes to Dewey's 22,017,929 (45.9%). Dewey conceded in a radio address the following morning, but declined to personally call or to send a telegram to President Roosevelt. Roosevelt sent Dewey a telegram reading, "I thank you for your statement, which I heard over the air a few minutes ago." Roosevelt's victory made him the only person ever to win the presidential popular vote four times, and neither party would again win the popular vote four consecutive times until the Democrats did so in all four elections from 2008 to 2020.

The important question had been which leader, Roosevelt or Dewey, should be chosen for the critical days of peacemaking and reconstruction following the war's conclusion. Most American voters concluded that they should retain the governing party, and particularly the president who represented it. They also felt it unsafe to do so in "wartime", in view of ever-increasing domestic disagreements.

Dewey did better against Roosevelt than any of Roosevelt's previous three Republican opponents: Roosevelt's percentage and margin of the total vote were both less than in 1940. Dewey flipped the states of Wyoming, Wisconsin, and Ohio from the previous election, while Roosevelt flipped Michigan. Dewey also gained the personal satisfaction of finishing ahead of Roosevelt in his hometown of Hyde Park, New York, and ahead of Truman in his hometown of Independence, Missouri. Dewey would again become the Republican presidential nominee in 1948, challenging President Truman (who had assumed that office on FDR's death), and would again lose, though by somewhat smaller popular- and electoral-vote margins.

Roosevelt's net vote totals in the twelve largest cities increased from 2,112,000 votes in the 1940 election to 2,230,000 votes. Of the 3,095 counties/independent cities making returns, Roosevelt won the most popular votes in 1,751 (56.58%) while Dewey carried 1,343 (43.39%). The Texas Regular ticket carried one county (0.03%). In New York, only the combined support of the American Labor and Liberal parties (pledged to Roosevelt but otherwise independent of the Democrats to maintain their identities) enabled Roosevelt to win the electoral votes of his home state.

In 1944, the constantly growing Southern protest against Roosevelt's leadership became clearest in Texas, where 135,553 people voted against Roosevelt but not for the Republican ticket. The Texas Regular ticket resulted from a split in the Democratic Party in its two state conventions, May 23 and September 12, 1944. This ticket, which represented the Democratic element opposing the re-election of President Roosevelt, called for the "restoration of states' rights which have been destroyed by the Communist New Deal" and "restoration of the supremacy of the white race". Its electors were uninstructed.

== Results ==
Until 1996 this was the last time in which an incumbent Democratic president won re-election after serving a full term in office. This was also the last election until 2012 in which the incumbent Democratic president received over 50 percent of the popular vote after receiving over 50 percent of it in the previous election. As of 2026, this was the most recent presidential election in which a Democratic ticket has won every state of the former Confederacy as well as the entire southern region. This was the first election since 1892 that a Democrat won without taking Wyoming and Ohio. Roosevelt is the only president to serve for more than two terms; in 1951, the Twenty-second Amendment was ratified, limiting the number of terms a person may be president.

As he had in 1940, Roosevelt was the third of just four presidents in United States history to win re-election with a lower percentage of the electoral vote than in their prior elections; the other three are James Madison in 1812, Woodrow Wilson in 1916, and Barack Obama in 2012. Additionally, Roosevelt was the fourth of only five presidents to win re-election with a smaller percentage of the popular vote than in prior elections; the other four are Madison in 1812, Andrew Jackson in 1832, Grover Cleveland in 1892, and Obama in 2012.

This is the last election in which New Hampshire and Oregon voted Democratic until 1964 and the last in which Connecticut, Delaware, Maryland, Michigan, New Jersey, New York, and Pennsylvania did so until 1960.

The 432 electoral votes received by Roosevelt, added to the 449 electoral votes he received in 1940, and the 523 electoral votes he received in 1936, and the 472 electoral votes he received in 1932, gave him the most total electoral votes received by any candidate who was elected to the office of president, since he is the only president to serve more than two terms (1,876).

Electoral results
Presidential candidate	Party	Home state	Popular vote		Electoral vote	Running mate		
Presidential candidate	Party	Home state	Count	Percentage	Electoral vote	Vice-presidential candidate	Home state	Electoral vote
Franklin Delano Roosevelt (incumbent)	Democratic	New York	25,612,916	53.39%	432	Harry S. Truman	Missouri	432
Thomas Edmund Dewey	Republican	New York	22,017,929	45.89%	99	John William Bricker	Ohio	99
None	Texas Regulars	(n/a)	143,238	0.30%	0	None	(n/a)	0
Norman Mattoon Thomas	Socialist	New York	79,017	0.16%	0	Darlington Hoopes	Pennsylvania	0
Claude A. Watson	Prohibition	California	74,758	0.16%	0	Andrew Nathan Johnson	Kentucky	0
Edward A. Teichert	Socialist Labor	Pennsylvania	45,188	0.09%	0	Arla Arbaugh	Ohio	0
Other			11,816	0.02%	—	Other		—
Total			47,977,063	100%	531			531
Needed to win					266			266

Source (popular vote): Leip, David. "1944 Presidential Election Results". Dave Leip's Atlas of U.S. Presidential Elections.Source (electoral vote): "Electoral College Box Scores 1789–1996". National Archives and Records Administration.

Popular vote
Roosevelt	53.39%
Dewey	45.89%
No Candidate	0.28%
Thomas	0.16%
Others	0.28%

Electoral vote
Roosevelt	81.36%
Dewey	18.64%

=== Geography of results ===
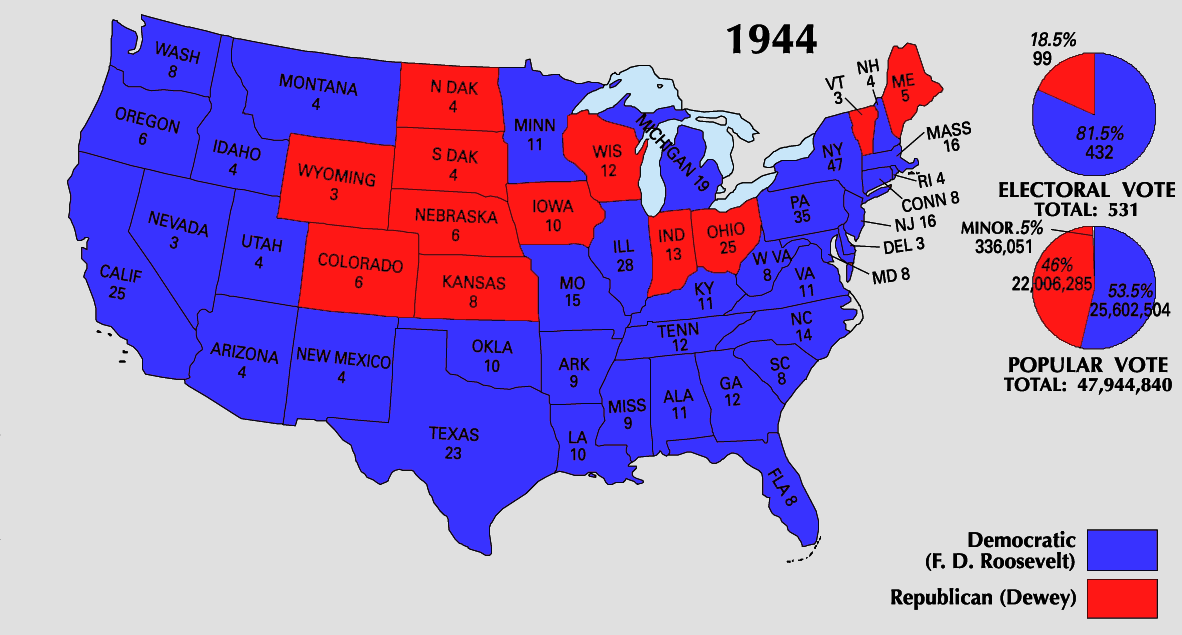

Results by county, shaded according to winning candidate's percentage of the vote

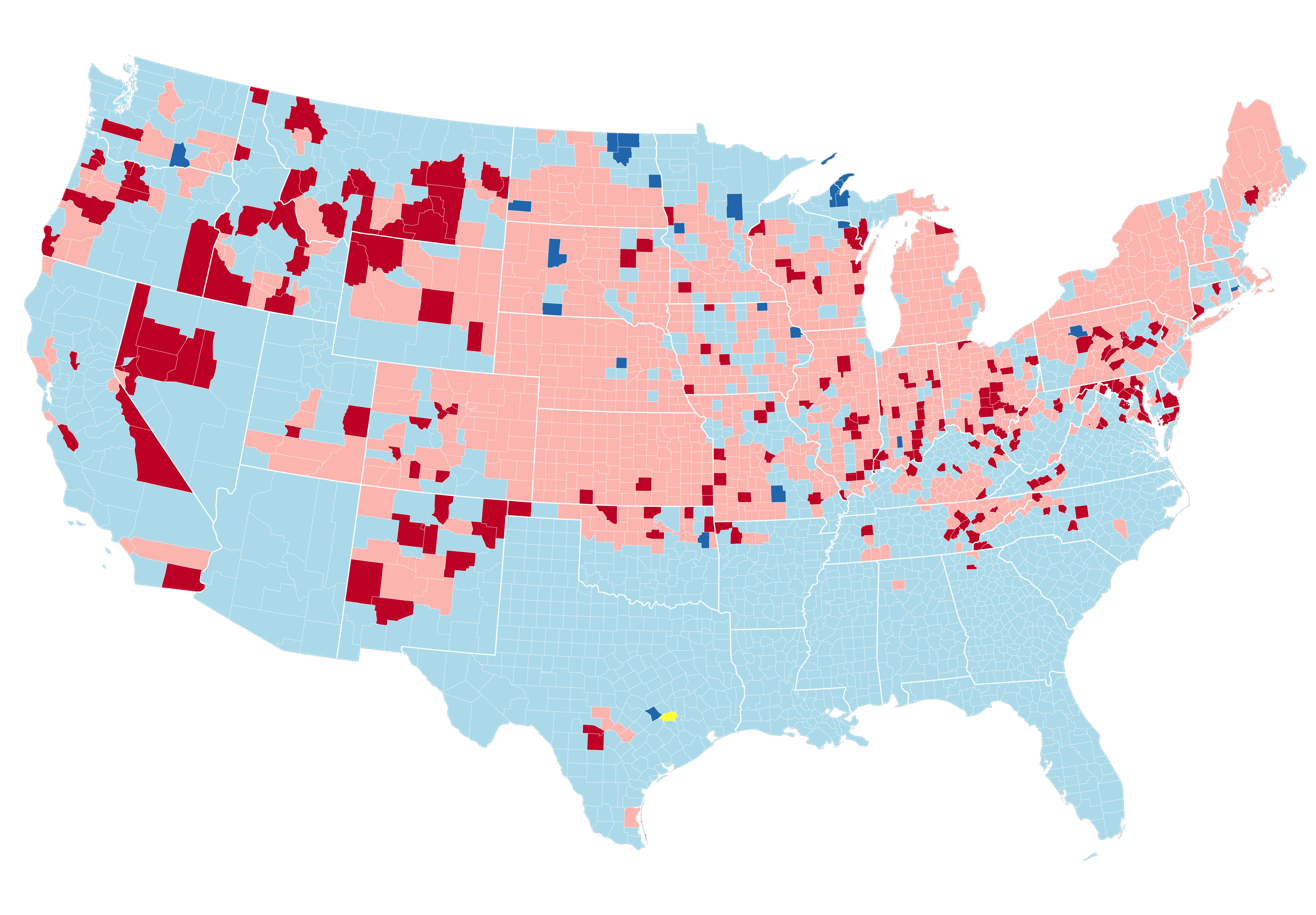
1940-44 county flips. Light red indicates GOP hold, dark red indicates GOP flip, light blue indicates Dem hold, dark blue indicates Dem flip, and yellow indicates unpledged electors flip.

==== Gallery of maps ====
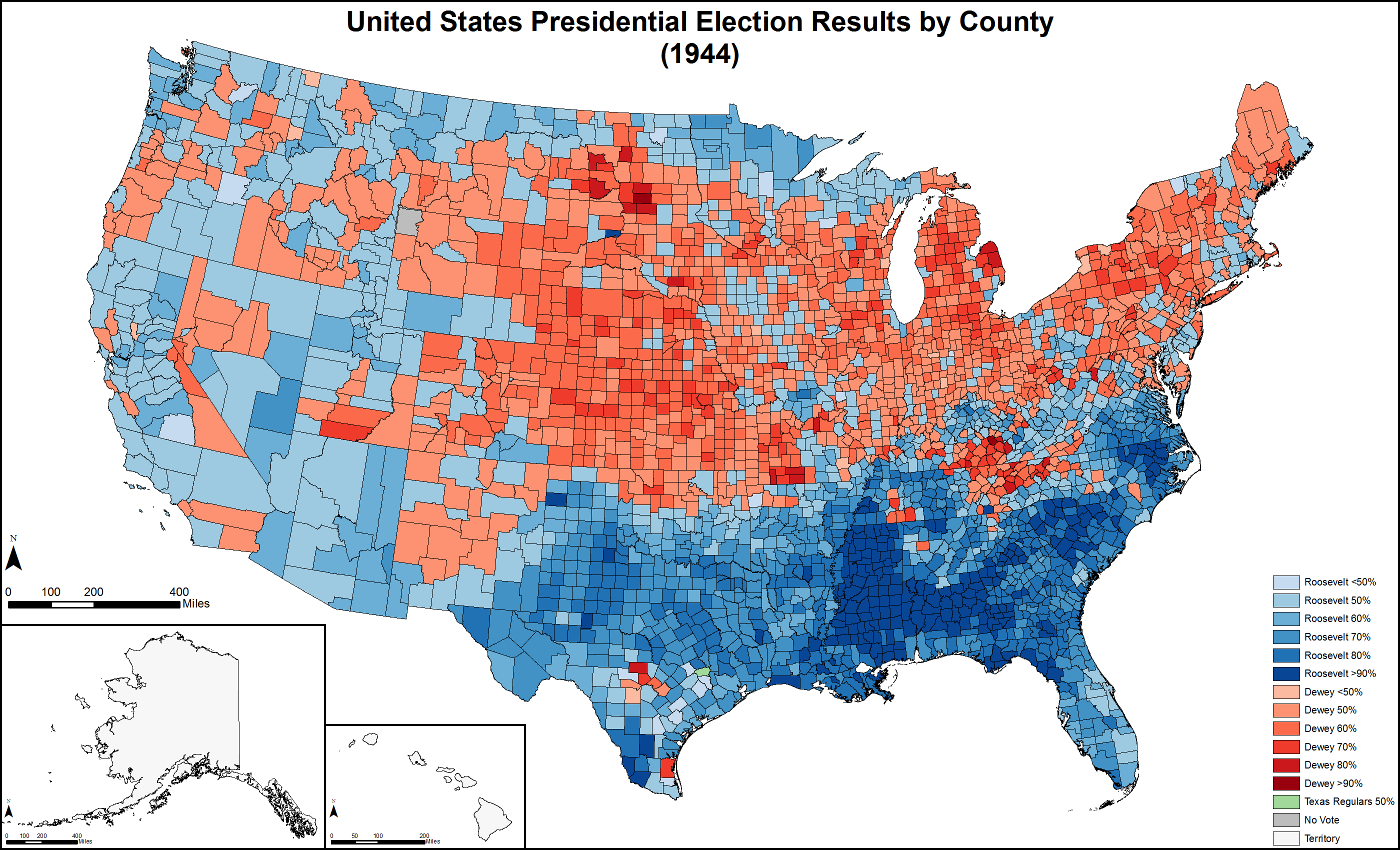
Presidential election results by county

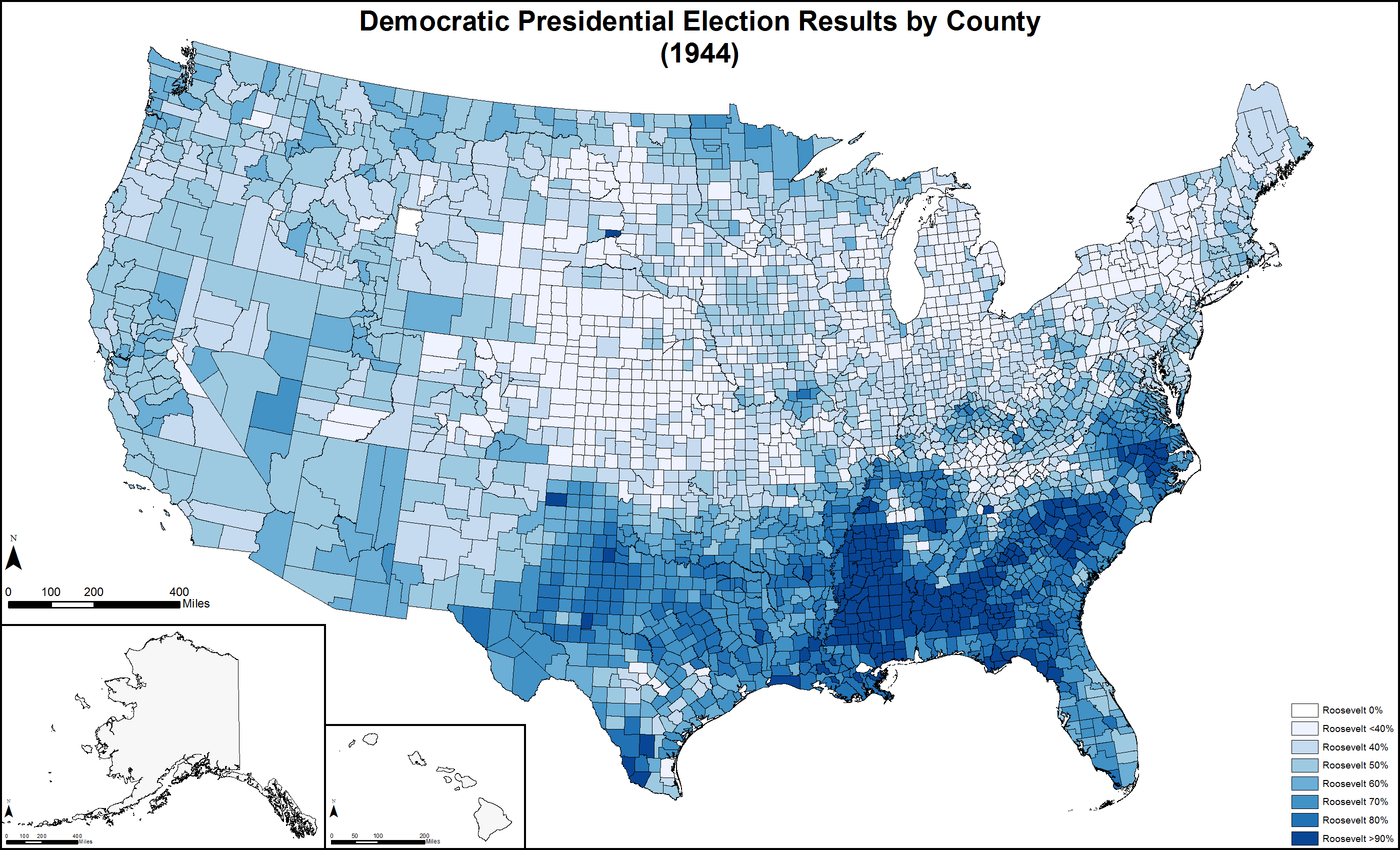
Democratic presidential election results by county

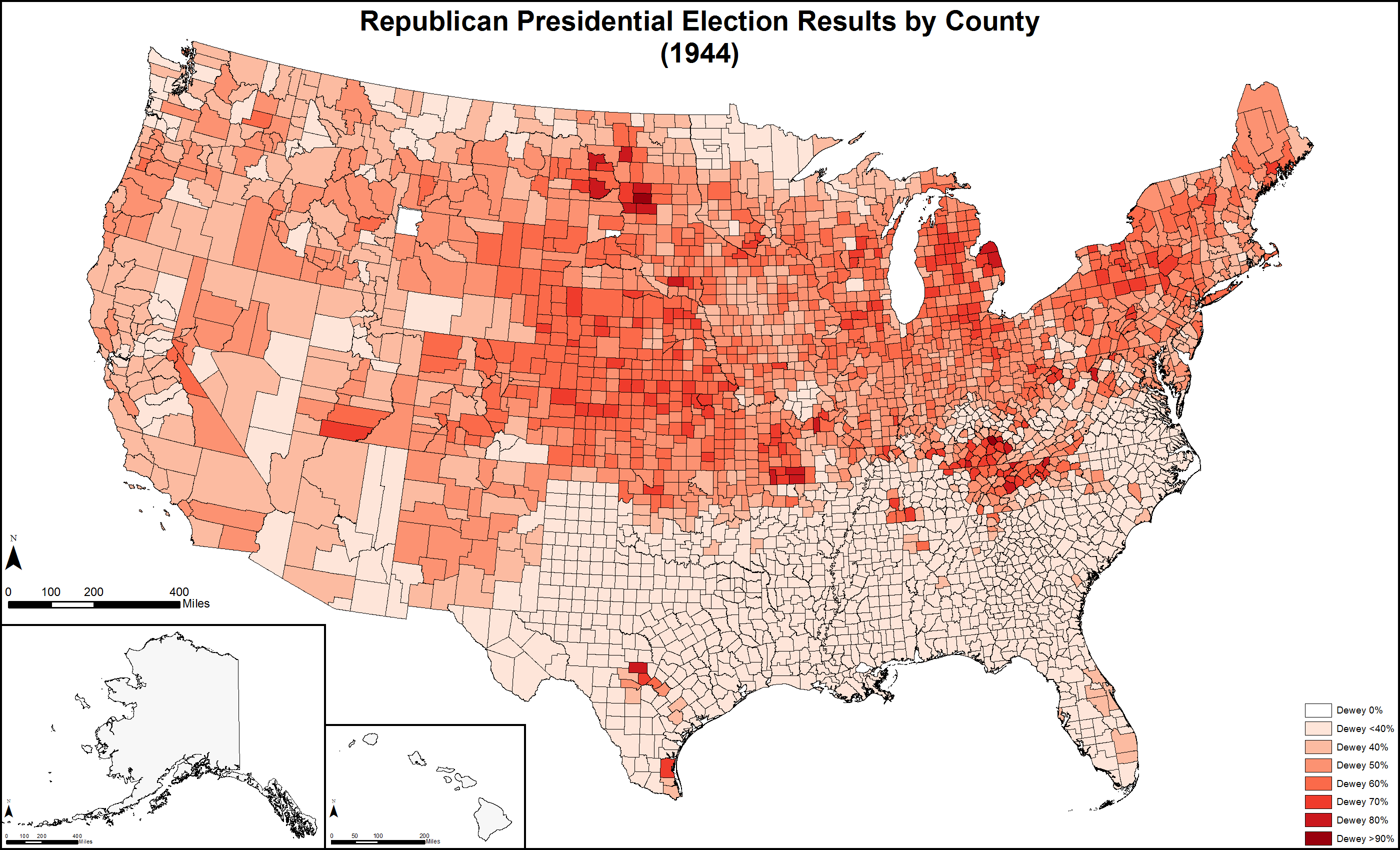
Republican presidential election results by county

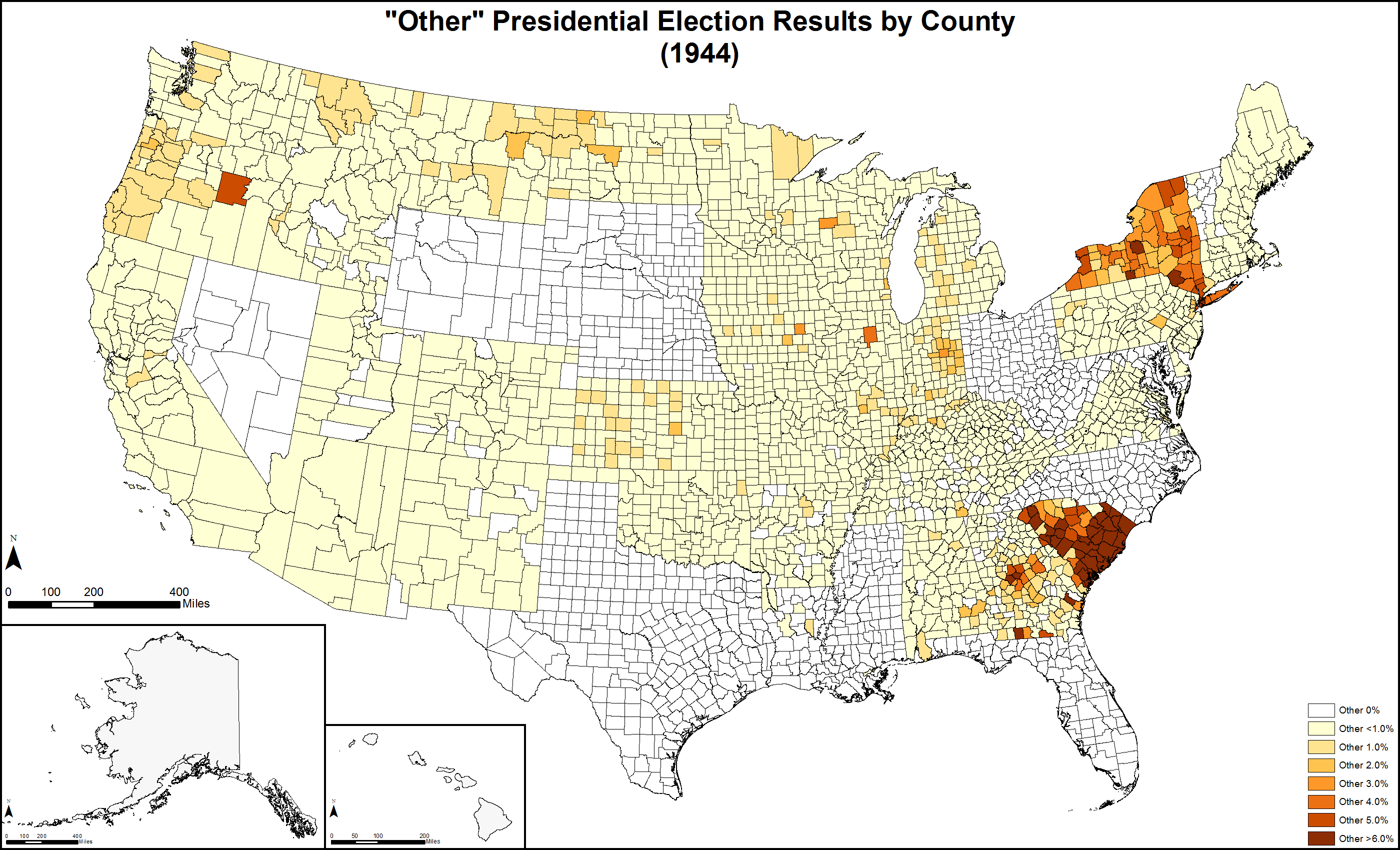
"Other" presidential election results by county

==== Results by state ====
States/districts won by Roosevelt/Truman
States/districts won by Dewey/Bricker

		Franklin D. Roosevelt Democratic			Thomas E. Dewey Republican			No Candidate Southern Democrat/ Texas Regulars			Norman Thomas Socialist			Other			Margin		State total	
State	electoral votes	#	%	electoral votes	#	%	electoral votes	#	%	electoral votes	#	%	electoral votes	#	%	electoral votes	#	%	#	
Alabama	11	198,918	81.28	11	44,540	18.20	-	-	-	-	190	0.08	-	1,095	0.45	-	154,378	63.08	244,743	AL
Arizona	4	80,926	58.80	4	56,287	40.90	-	-	-	-	-	-	-	421	0.31	-	24,639	17.90	137,634	AZ
Arkansas	9	148,965	69.95	9	63,551	29.84	-	-	-	-	438	0.21	-	-	-	-	85,414	40.11	212,954	AR
California	25	1,988,564	56.48	25	1,512,965	42.97	-	-	-	-	2,515	0.07	-	16,831	0.48	-	475,599	13.51	3,520,875	CA
Colorado	6	234,331	46.40	-	268,731	53.21	6	-	-	-	1,977	0.39	-	-	-	-	-34,400	-6.81	505,039	CO
Connecticut	8	435,146	52.30	8	390,527	46.94	-	-	-	-	5,097	0.61	-	1,220	0.15	-	44,619	5.36	831,990	CT
Delaware	3	68,166	54.38	3	56,747	45.27	-	-	-	-	154	0.12	-	294	0.23	-	11,419	9.11	125,361	DE
Florida	8	339,377	70.32	8	143,215	29.68	-	-	-	-	-	-	-	-	-	-	196,162	40.65	482,592	FL
Georgia	12	268,187	81.74	12	59,880	18.25	-	-	-	-	6	0.00	-	36	0.01	-	208,307	63.49	328,109	GA
Idaho	4	107,399	51.55	4	100,137	48.07	-	-	-	-	282	0.14	-	503	0.24	-	7,262	3.49	208,321	ID
Illinois	28	2,079,479	51.52	28	1,939,314	48.05	-	-	-	-	180	0.00	-	17,088	0.42	-	140,165	3.47	4,036,061	IL
Indiana	13	781,403	46.73	-	875,891	52.38	13	-	-	-	2,223	0.13	-	12,574	0.75	-	-94,488	-5.65	1,672,091	IN
Iowa	10	499,876	47.49	-	547,267	51.99	10	-	-	-	1,511	0.14	-	3,945	0.37	-	-47,391	-4.50	1,052,599	IA
Kansas	8	287,458	39.18	-	442,096	60.25	8	-	-	-	1,613	0.22	-	2,609	0.36	-	-154,638	-21.07	733,776	KS
Kentucky	11	472,589	54.45	11	392,448	45.22	-	-	-	-	535	0.06	-	2,349	0.27	-	80,141	9.23	867,921	KY
Louisiana	10	281,564	80.59	10	67,750	19.39	-	-	-	-	-	-	-	69	0.02	-	213,814	61.20	349,383	LA
Maine	5	140,631	47.45	-	155,434	52.44	5	-	-	-	-	-	-	335	0.11	-	-14,803	-4.99	296,400	ME
Maryland	8	315,490	51.85	8	292,949	48.15	-	-	-	-	-	-	-	-	-	-	22,541	3.70	608,439	MD
Massachusetts	16	1,035,296	52.80	16	921,350	46.99	-	-	-	-	-	-	-	4,019	0.21	-	113,946	5.81	1,960,665	MA
Michigan	19	1,106,899	50.19	19	1,084,423	49.18	-	-	-	-	4,598	0.21	-	9,303	0.42	-	22,476	1.02	2,205,223	MI
Minnesota	11	589,864	52.41	11	527,416	46.86	-	-	-	-	5,073	0.45	-	3,176	0.28	-	62,448	5.55	1,125,529	MN
Mississippi	9	168,479	93.56	9	11,601	6.44	-	-	-	-	-	-	-	-	-	-	156,878	87.12	180,080	MS
Missouri	15	807,804	51.37	15	761,524	48.43	-	-	-	-	1,751	0.11	-	1,395	0.09	-	46,280	2.94	1,572,474	MO
Montana	4	112,556	54.28	4	93,163	44.93	-	-	-	-	1,296	0.63	-	340	0.16	-	19,393	9.35	207,355	MT
Nebraska	6	233,246	41.42	-	329,880	58.58	6	-	-	-	-	-	-	-	-	-	-96,634	-17.16	563,126	NE
Nevada	3	29,623	54.62	3	24,611	45.38	-	-	-	-	-	-	-	-	-	-	5,012	9.24	54,234	NV
New Hampshire	4	119,663	52.11	4	109,916	47.87	-	-	-	-	46	0.02	-	-	-	-	9,747	4.24	229,625	NH
New Jersey	16	987,874	50.31	16	961,335	48.95	-	-	-	-	3,358	0.17	-	11,194	0.57	-	26,539	1.35	1,963,761	NJ
New Mexico	4	81,389	53.47	4	70,688	46.44	-	-	-	-	-	-	-	148	0.10	-	10,701	7.03	152,225	NM
New York	47	3,304,238	52.31	47	2,987,647	47.30	-	-	-	-	10,553	0.17	-	14,352	0.23	-	316,591	5.01	6,316,790	NY
North Carolina	14	527,399	66.71	14	263,155	33.29	-	-	-	-	-	-	-	-	-	-	264,244	33.43	790,554	NC
North Dakota	4	100,144	45.48	-	118,535	53.84	4	-	-	-	943	0.43	-	549	0.25	-	-18,391	-8.35	220,171	ND
Ohio	25	1,570,763	49.82	-	1,582,293	50.18	25	-	-	-	-	-	-	-	-	-	-11,530	-0.37	3,153,056	OH
Oklahoma	10	401,549	55.57	10	319,424	44.20	-	-	-	-	-	-	-	1,663	0.23	-	82,125	11.36	722,636	OK
Oregon	6	248,635	51.78	6	225,365	46.94	-	-	-	-	3,785	0.79	-	2,362	0.49	-	23,270	4.85	480,147	OR
Pennsylvania	35	1,940,479	51.14	35	1,835,054	48.36	-	-	-	-	11,721	0.31	-	7,539	0.20	-	105,425	2.78	3,794,793	PA
Rhode Island	4	175,356	58.59	4	123,487	41.26	-	-	-	-	-	-	-	433	0.14	-	51,869	17.33	299,276	RI
South Carolina	8	90,601	87.64	8	4,610	4.46	-	7,799	7.54	-	-	-	-	365	0.35	-	82,802	80.10	103,375	SC
South Dakota	4	96,711	41.67	-	135,365	58.33	4	-	-	-	-	-	-	-	-	-	-38,654	-16.66	232,076	SD
Tennessee	12	308,707	60.45	12	200,311	39.22	-	-	-	-	792	0.16	-	882	0.17	-	108,396	21.23	510,692	TN
Texas	23	821,605	71.42	23	191,425	16.64	-	135,439	11.77	-	594	0.05	-	1,268	0.11	-	630,180	54.78	1,150,331	TX
Utah	4	150,088	60.44	4	97,891	39.42	-	-	-	-	340	0.14	-	-	-	-	52,197	21.02	248,319	UT
Vermont	3	53,820	42.93	-	71,527	57.06	3	-	-	-	-	-	-	14	0.01	-	-17,707	-14.12	125,361	VT
Virginia	11	242,276	62.36	11	145,243	37.39	-	-	-	-	417	0.11	-	549	0.14	-	97,033	24.98	388,485	VA
Washington	8	486,774	56.84	8	361,689	42.24	-	-	-	-	3,824	0.45	-	4,041	0.47	-	125,085	14.61	856,328	WA
West Virginia	8	392,777	54.89	8	322,819	45.11	-	-	-	-	-	-	-	-	-	-	69,958	9.78	715,596	WV
Wisconsin	12	650,413	48.57	-	674,532	50.37	12	-	-	-	13,205	0.99	-	1,002	0.07	-	-24,119	-1.80	1,339,152	WI
Wyoming	3	49,419	48.77	-	51,921	51.23	3	-	-	-	-	-	-	-	-	-	-2,502	-2.47	101,340	WY
Totals:	531	25,612,916	53.39	432	22,017,929	45.89	99	143,238	0.30	-	79,017	0.16	-	123,963	0.26	-	3,594,987	7.49	47,977,063	US

==== States that flipped from Democratic to Republican ====
- Ohio
- Wisconsin
- Wyoming

==== States that flipped from Republican to Democratic ====
- Michigan

==== Close states ====
Margin of victory less than 1% (25 electoral votes):

1. Ohio, 0.37% (11,530 votes)

Margin of victory less than 5% (165 electoral votes):

1. Michigan, 1.02% (22,476 votes)
2. New Jersey, 1.35% (26,539 votes)
3. Wisconsin, 1.80% (24,119 votes)
4. Wyoming, 2.47% (2,502 votes)
5. Pennsylvania, 2.78% (105,425 votes)
6. Missouri, 2.94% (46,280 votes)
7. Illinois, 3.47% (140,165 votes)
8. Idaho, 3.49% (7,262 votes)
9. Maryland, 3.70% (22,541 votes)
10. New Hampshire, 4.24% (9,747 votes)
11. Iowa, 4.50% (47,391 votes)
12. Oregon, 4.85% (23,270 votes)
13. Maine, 4.99% (14,803 votes)

Margin of victory between 5% and 10% (138 electoral votes):

1. New York, 5.01% (316,591 votes) (tipping point state)
2. Connecticut, 5.36% (44,619 votes)
3. Minnesota, 5.55% (62,448 votes)
4. Indiana, 5.65% (94,488 votes)
5. Massachusetts, 5.81% (113,946 votes)
6. Colorado, 6.81% (34,400 votes)
7. New Mexico, 7.03% (10,701 votes)
8. North Dakota, 8.35% (18,391 votes)
9. Delaware, 9.11% (11,419 votes)
10. Kentucky, 9.23% (80,141 votes)
11. Nevada, 9.24% (5,012 votes)
12. Montana, 9.35% (19,393 votes)
13. West Virginia, 9.78% (69,958 votes)

==== Statistics ====
Counties with highest percent of vote (Democratic)

1. Armstrong County, South Dakota 100.00%
2. Leake County, Mississippi 99.15%
3. Chesterfield County, South Carolina 98.77%
4. Taliaferro County, Georgia 98.48%
5. Barnwell County, South Carolina 98.41%

Counties with highest percent of vote (Republican)

1. McIntosh County, North Dakota 91.98%
2. Jackson County, Kentucky 91.56%
3. Sevier County, Tennessee 87.24%
4. Logan County, North Dakota 86.47%
5. Owsley County, Kentucky 86.11%

== See also ==
- 1944 United States House of Representatives elections
- 1944 United States Senate elections
- United States home front during World War II
- Hell-Bent for Election, an animated Roosevelt campaign film
- 1944 Communist National Convention
- Fourth inauguration of Franklin D. Roosevelt
