= 1944 United States presidential election in North Dakota =

- November 7, 1944

All 4 North Dakota votes to the Electoral College

Nominee	Thomas E. Dewey	Franklin D. Roosevelt
Party	Republican	Democratic
Home state	New York	New York
Running mate	John W. Bricker	Harry S. Truman
Electoral vote	4	0
Popular vote	118,535	100,144
Percentage	53.84%	45.48%
County results
Dewey
50–60%
60–70%
70–80%
80–90%
90–100%
Roosevelt
40–50%
50–60%
60–70%
President before election
Franklin D. Roosevelt
Democratic
Elected President
Franklin D. Roosevelt
Democratic

The 1944 United States presidential election in North Dakota took place on November 7, 1944, as part of the 1944 United States presidential election. Voters chose four representatives, or electors, to the Electoral College, who voted for president and vice president.

North Dakota was won by Governor Thomas E. Dewey (R–New York), running with Governor John Bricker, with 53.84% of the popular vote, against incumbent President Franklin D. Roosevelt (D–New York), running with Missouri Senator Harry S. Truman, with 45.48% of the popular vote. North Dakota was one of six states that shifted left from 1940, alongside Illinois, Michigan, Minnesota, New York, and Rhode Island.

== Results ==
1944 United States presidential election in North Dakota
Party	Candidate	Votes	%
Republican	Thomas E. Dewey	118,535	53.84%
Democratic	Franklin D. Roosevelt (inc.)	100,144	45.48%
Socialist	Norman Thomas	943	0.43%
Prohibition	Claude A. Watson	549	0.25%
Total votes		220,171	100%

=== Results by county ===
County	Thomas E. Dewey Republican		Franklin D. Roosevelt Democratic		Norman Thomas Socialist		Claude A. Watson Prohibition		Margin		Total votes cast
County	#	%	#	%	#	%	#	%	#	%	Total votes cast
Adams	966	58.62%	668	40.53%	13	0.79%	1	0.06%	298	18.08%	1,648
Barnes	3,696	55.55%	2,922	43.92%	22	0.33%	13	0.20%	774	11.63%	6,653
Benson	1,726	43.04%	2,261	56.38%	17	0.42%	6	0.15%	-535	-13.34%	4,010
Billings	354	62.54%	209	36.93%	2	0.35%	1	0.18%	145	25.62%	566
Bottineau	2,663	57.15%	1,953	41.91%	38	0.82%	6	0.13%	710	15.24%	4,660
Bowman	785	55.67%	609	43.19%	15	1.06%	1	0.07%	176	12.48%	1,410
Burke	1,540	54.47%	1,226	43.37%	58	2.05%	3	0.11%	314	11.11%	2,827
Burleigh	4,616	59.95%	3,061	39.75%	14	0.18%	9	0.12%	1,555	20.19%	7,700
Cass	10,661	50.37%	10,390	49.09%	51	0.24%	65	0.31%	271	1.28%	21,167
Cavalier	2,011	46.68%	2,274	52.79%	4	0.09%	19	0.44%	-263	-6.10%	4,308
Dickey	2,134	61.11%	1,339	38.34%	9	0.26%	10	0.29%	795	22.77%	3,492
Divide	1,225	44.19%	1,513	54.58%	26	0.94%	8	0.29%	-288	-10.39%	2,772
Dunn	1,374	59.79%	919	39.99%	4	0.17%	1	0.04%	455	19.80%	2,298
Eddy	974	47.56%	1,042	50.88%	24	1.17%	8	0.39%	-68	-3.32%	2,048
Emmons	2,255	76.99%	656	22.40%	13	0.44%	5	0.17%	1,599	54.59%	2,929
Foster	891	44.39%	1,102	54.91%	11	0.55%	3	0.15%	-211	-10.51%	2,007
Golden Valley	709	61.23%	443	38.26%	4	0.35%	2	0.17%	266	22.97%	1,158
Grand Forks	5,668	42.19%	7,707	57.37%	18	0.13%	41	0.31%	-2,039	-15.18%	13,434
Grant	1,745	80.64%	410	18.95%	5	0.23%	4	0.18%	1,335	61.69%	2,164
Griggs	990	44.45%	1,228	55.14%	4	0.18%	5	0.22%	-238	-10.69%	2,227
Hettinger	1,812	76.42%	554	23.37%	4	0.17%	1	0.04%	1,258	53.06%	2,371
Kidder	1,397	66.43%	693	32.95%	5	0.24%	8	0.38%	704	33.48%	2,103
LaMoure	2,298	61.25%	1,422	37.90%	14	0.37%	18	0.48%	876	23.35%	3,752
Logan	1,904	86.47%	294	13.35%	3	0.14%	1	0.05%	1,610	73.12%	2,202
McHenry	3,141	61.44%	1,934	37.83%	24	0.47%	13	0.25%	1,207	23.61%	5,112
McIntosh	2,682	91.98%	226	7.75%	8	0.27%	0	0.00%	2,456	84.22%	2,916
McKenzie	1,241	43.35%	1,592	55.61%	9	0.31%	21	0.73%	-351	-12.26%	2,863
McLean	2,822	53.37%	2,326	43.99%	130	2.46%	10	0.19%	496	9.38%	5,288
Mercer	2,504	84.71%	445	15.05%	5	0.17%	2	0.07%	2,059	69.65%	2,956
Morton	3,537	65.32%	1,850	34.16%	20	0.37%	8	0.15%	1,687	31.15%	5,415
Mountrail	1,666	45.11%	1,981	53.64%	22	0.60%	24	0.65%	-315	-8.53%	3,693
Nelson	1,506	43.77%	1,925	55.94%	3	0.09%	7	0.20%	-419	-12.18%	3,441
Oliver	756	76.83%	219	22.26%	6	0.61%	3	0.30%	537	54.57%	984
Pembina	2,410	44.95%	2,903	54.15%	2	0.04%	46	0.86%	-493	-9.20%	5,361
Pierce	1,992	60.07%	1,307	39.41%	11	0.33%	6	0.18%	685	20.66%	3,316
Ramsey	2,505	49.28%	2,539	49.95%	29	0.57%	10	0.20%	-34	-0.67%	5,083
Ransom	2,044	55.06%	1,639	44.15%	21	0.57%	8	0.22%	405	10.91%	3,712
Renville	1,046	48.34%	1,095	50.60%	19	0.88%	4	0.18%	-49	-2.26%	2,164
Richland	4,402	57.74%	3,192	41.87%	11	0.14%	19	0.25%	1,210	15.87%	7,624
Rolette	1,070	37.78%	1,745	61.62%	12	0.42%	5	0.18%	-675	-23.83%	2,832
Sargent	1,488	50.72%	1,426	48.60%	11	0.37%	9	0.31%	62	2.11%	2,934
Sheridan	1,910	82.76%	386	16.72%	6	0.26%	6	0.26%	1,524	66.03%	2,308
Sioux	673	59.98%	445	39.66%	1	0.09%	3	0.27%	228	20.32%	1,122
Slope	434	49.43%	439	50.00%	5	0.57%	0	0.00%	-5	-0.57%	878
Stark	2,852	64.85%	1,534	34.88%	5	0.11%	7	0.16%	1,318	29.97%	4,398
Steele	1,042	43.89%	1,320	55.60%	8	0.34%	4	0.17%	-278	-11.71%	2,374
Stutsman	4,220	56.20%	3,243	43.19%	27	0.36%	19	0.25%	977	13.01%	7,509
Towner	1,097	47.99%	1,185	51.84%	3	0.13%	1	0.04%	-88	-3.85%	2,286
Traill	2,370	48.68%	2,479	50.91%	10	0.21%	10	0.21%	-109	-2.24%	4,869
Walsh	2,471	34.07%	4,747	65.46%	10	0.14%	24	0.33%	-2,276	-31.38%	7,252
Ward	5,514	48.30%	5,822	50.99%	58	0.51%	23	0.20%	-308	-2.70%	11,417
Wells	2,529	61.59%	1,557	37.92%	13	0.32%	7	0.17%	972	23.67%	4,106
Williams	2,217	36.57%	3,748	61.82%	87	1.43%	11	0.18%	-1,531	-25.25%	6,063
Total	118,535	53.84%	100,144	45.48%	954	0.43%	549	0.25%	18,391	8.35%	220,182

==== Counties that flipped from Republican to Democratic ====
- Cavalier
- Ramsey
- Slope
- Towner
- Traill

== See also ==
- United States presidential elections in North Dakota
