= 1944 United States presidential election in Illinois =

- November 7, 1944

All 28 Illinois votes to the Electoral College

Nominee	Franklin D. Roosevelt	Thomas E. Dewey
Party	Democratic	Republican
Home state	New York	New York
Running mate	Harry S. Truman	John W. Bricker
Electoral vote	28	0
Popular vote	2,079,479	1,939,314
Percentage	51.52%	48.05%
County results
Roosevelt
40–50%
50–60%
Dewey
40–50%
50–60%
60–70%
70–80%
President before election
Franklin D. Roosevelt
Democratic
Elected President
Franklin D. Roosevelt
Democratic

The 1944 United States presidential election in Illinois took place on November 7, 1944, as part of the 1944 United States presidential election. State voters chose 28 representatives, or electors, to the Electoral College, who voted for president and vice president.

Illinois was won by incumbent President Franklin D. Roosevelt (D–New York), running with Senator Harry S. Truman, with 51.52% of the popular vote, against Governor Thomas E. Dewey (R–New York), running with Governor John W. Bricker, with 48.05% of the popular vote. Illinois was one of six states that shifted left from 1940, alongside Michigan, Minnesota, New York, North Dakota, and Rhode Island.

== Primaries ==
The primaries and general elections coincided with those for other federal offices (Senate and House), as well as those for state offices.

=== Turnout ===
The total vote in the state-run primary elections (Democratic and Republican) was 646,993.

The total vote in the general election was 4,036,061. Both major parties held non-binding state-run preferential primaries on April 11.

=== Democratic ===
1944 Illinois Democratic presidential primary
- April 11, 1944
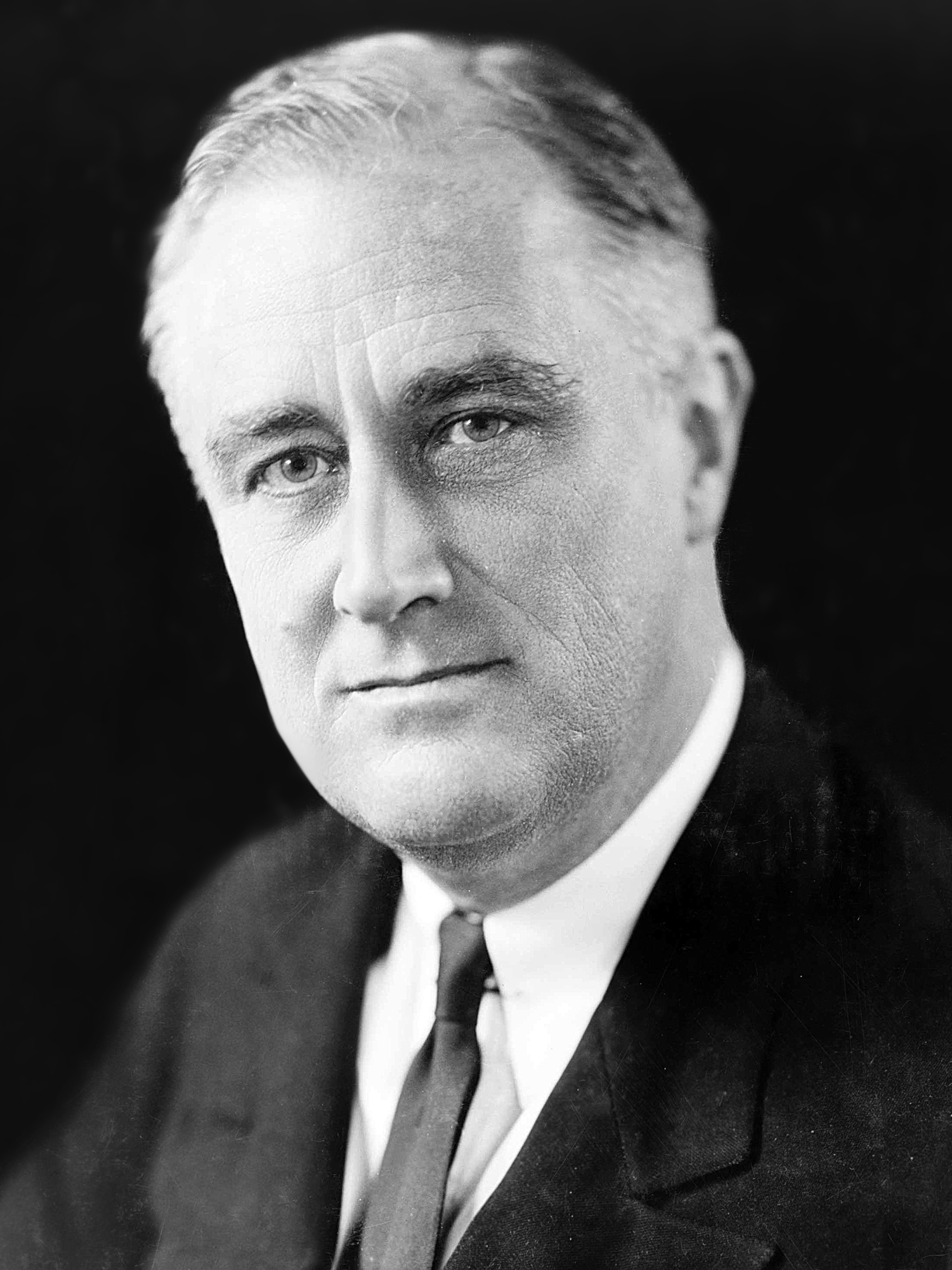
Candidate	Franklin D. Roosevelt
Home state	New York
Popular vote	48,561
Percentage	99.30%

The 1944 Illinois Democratic presidential primary was held on April 11, 1944, in the U.S. state of Illinois as one of the Democratic Party's state primaries ahead of the 1944 presidential election.

The popular vote was a non-binding "beauty contest". Delegates were instead elected by direct votes by congressional district on delegate candidates.

1944 Illinois Democratic presidential primary
Candidate	Votes	%
Franklin D. Roosevelt	48,561	99.30
Scattering	343	0.70
Total	48,904	100

=== Republican ===
1944 Illinois Republican presidential primary
- April 11, 1944
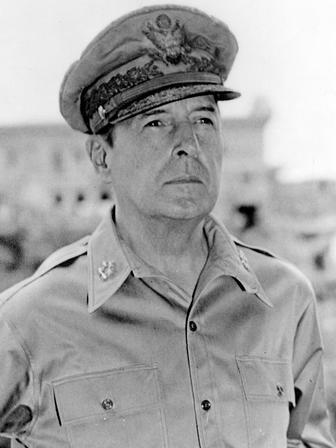

Candidate	Douglas MacArthur	Riley A. Bender
Home state	Wisconsin	Illinois
Popular vote	550,354	37,575
Percentage	92.02%	6.28%

The 1944 Illinois Republican presidential primary was held on April 11, 1944, in the U.S. state of Illinois as one of the Republican Party's state primaries ahead of the 1944 presidential election.

The preference vote was a "beauty contest". Delegates were instead selected by direct-vote in each congressional districts on delegate candidates.

Douglas MacArthur won the primary. Illinois businessman Riley A. Bender placed second, running as a favorite son.

1944 Illinois Republican presidential primary
Candidate	Votes	%
Douglas MacArthur	550,354	92.02
Riley A. Bender	37,575	6.28
Thomas Dewey	9,192	1.54
Everett Dirksen	581	0.10
John Bricker	148	0.03
Harold E. Stassen	111	0.02
Wendell Willkie	107	0.02
Scattering	21	0.00
Total	598,089	100

== Results ==
1944 United States presidential election in Illinois
Party	Candidate	Votes	%
Democratic	Franklin D. Roosevelt (inc.)	2,079,479	51.52%
Republican	Thomas E. Dewey	1,939,314	48.05%
Socialist Labor	Edward Teichert	9,677	0.24%
Prohibition	Claude Watson	7,411	0.18%
Write-in	Norman Thomas	180	0.00%
Total votes		4,036,061	100%

=== Results by county ===
County	Franklin Delano Roosevelt Democratic		Thomas Edmund Dewey Republican		Various candidates Other parties		Margin		Total votes cast
County	#	%	#	%	#	%	#	%	Total votes cast
Adams	13,733	46.65%	15,564	52.87%	142	0.48%	-1,831	-6.22%	29,439
Alexander	4,767	49.47%	4,792	49.73%	78	0.81%	-25	-0.26%	9,637
Bond	2,607	38.86%	3,907	58.24%	194	2.89%	-1,300	-19.38%	6,708
Boone	2,074	26.59%	5,708	73.18%	18	0.23%	-3,634	-46.59%	7,800
Brown	1,849	51.26%	1,738	48.18%	20	0.55%	111	3.08%	3,607
Bureau	6,976	37.05%	11,802	62.68%	51	0.27%	-4,826	-25.63%	18,829
Calhoun	1,271	39.22%	1,956	60.35%	14	0.43%	-685	-21.14%	3,241
Carroll	2,843	31.72%	6,101	68.08%	18	0.20%	-3,258	-36.35%	8,962
Cass	3,909	51.54%	3,641	48.00%	35	0.46%	268	3.53%	7,585
Champaign	13,842	42.00%	18,935	57.46%	177	0.54%	-5,093	-15.45%	32,954
Christian	9,360	50.77%	8,995	48.79%	82	0.44%	365	1.98%	18,437
Clark	3,619	40.02%	5,373	59.41%	52	0.57%	-1,754	-19.39%	9,044
Clay	3,531	43.54%	4,484	55.29%	95	1.17%	-953	-11.75%	8,110
Clinton	3,944	36.69%	6,753	62.82%	53	0.49%	-2,809	-26.13%	10,750
Coles	8,936	48.40%	9,473	51.31%	54	0.29%	-537	-2.91%	18,463
Cook	1,275,367	57.81%	924,659	41.91%	6,165	0.28%	350,708	15.90%	2,206,191
Crawford	4,482	42.22%	6,056	57.04%	79	0.74%	-1,574	-14.83%	10,617
Cumberland	2,391	46.83%	2,700	52.88%	15	0.29%	-309	-6.05%	5,106
DeKalb	6,004	32.97%	12,157	66.76%	49	0.27%	-6,153	-33.79%	18,210
DeWitt	3,658	43.77%	4,630	55.40%	69	0.83%	-972	-11.63%	8,357
Douglas	3,323	41.36%	4,684	58.29%	28	0.35%	-1,361	-16.94%	8,035
DuPage	18,711	30.79%	41,890	68.93%	174	0.29%	-23,179	-38.14%	60,775
Edgar	5,054	41.88%	6,961	57.68%	54	0.45%	-1,907	-15.80%	12,069
Edwards	1,197	28.16%	3,016	70.96%	37	0.87%	-1,819	-42.80%	4,250
Effingham	4,587	45.33%	5,441	53.77%	91	0.90%	-854	-8.44%	10,119
Fayette	5,435	45.72%	6,332	53.27%	120	1.01%	-897	-7.55%	11,887
Ford	2,270	29.85%	5,317	69.91%	18	0.24%	-3,047	-40.07%	7,605
Franklin	11,663	50.24%	11,377	49.01%	173	0.75%	286	1.23%	23,213
Fulton	8,946	44.22%	11,117	54.96%	166	0.82%	-2,171	-10.73%	20,229
Gallatin	2,175	50.64%	2,073	48.27%	47	1.09%	102	2.37%	4,295
Greene	4,268	49.78%	4,261	49.70%	45	0.52%	7	0.08%	8,574
Grundy	3,544	35.88%	6,310	63.89%	22	0.22%	-2,766	-28.01%	9,876
Hamilton	2,914	44.48%	3,582	54.68%	55	0.84%	-668	-10.20%	6,551
Hancock	5,338	39.90%	7,972	59.59%	68	0.51%	-2,634	-19.69%	13,378
Hardin	1,370	39.85%	2,037	59.25%	31	0.90%	-667	-19.40%	3,438
Henderson	1,550	36.43%	2,695	63.34%	10	0.24%	-1,145	-26.91%	4,255
Henry	9,130	40.11%	13,539	59.48%	92	0.40%	-4,409	-19.37%	22,761
Iroquois	5,168	33.03%	10,389	66.39%	91	0.58%	-5,221	-33.37%	15,648
Jackson	6,735	40.11%	10,002	59.57%	54	0.32%	-3,267	-19.46%	16,791
Jasper	3,142	47.43%	3,453	52.13%	29	0.44%	-311	-4.70%	6,624
Jefferson	8,496	51.33%	7,916	47.83%	139	0.84%	580	3.50%	16,551
Jersey	2,910	44.87%	3,546	54.67%	30	0.46%	-636	-9.81%	6,486
Jo Daviess	3,298	33.66%	6,465	65.99%	34	0.35%	-3,167	-32.33%	9,797
Johnson	1,522	31.49%	3,298	68.24%	13	0.27%	-1,776	-36.75%	4,833
Kane	23,362	37.54%	38,689	62.16%	185	0.30%	-15,327	-24.63%	62,236
Kankakee	11,342	42.50%	15,256	57.16%	90	0.34%	-3,914	-14.67%	26,688
Kendall	1,673	29.35%	4,022	70.55%	6	0.11%	-2,349	-41.20%	5,701
Knox	10,070	38.49%	15,964	61.02%	126	0.48%	-5,894	-22.53%	26,160
Lake	25,453	41.52%	35,674	58.19%	183	0.30%	-10,221	-16.67%	61,310
LaSalle	21,489	41.42%	28,179	54.32%	2,210	4.26%	-6,690	-12.90%	51,878
Lawrence	4,003	43.02%	5,191	55.79%	111	1.19%	-1,188	-12.77%	9,305
Lee	4,899	31.98%	10,397	67.88%	21	0.14%	-5,498	-35.89%	15,317
Livingston	6,231	33.29%	12,436	66.44%	52	0.28%	-6,205	-33.15%	18,719
Logan	4,868	37.88%	7,955	61.90%	29	0.23%	-3,087	-24.02%	12,852
Macon	22,808	53.58%	19,608	46.06%	153	0.36%	3,200	7.52%	42,569
Macoupin	11,951	50.46%	11,572	48.86%	160	0.68%	379	1.60%	23,683
Madison	40,114	58.24%	28,399	41.23%	359	0.52%	11,715	17.01%	68,872
Marion	10,079	51.32%	9,408	47.90%	153	0.78%	671	3.42%	19,640
Marshall	2,596	38.17%	4,195	61.68%	10	0.15%	-1,599	-23.51%	6,801
Mason	3,282	45.19%	3,959	54.52%	21	0.29%	-677	-9.32%	7,262
Massac	1,758	31.13%	3,814	67.53%	76	1.35%	-2,056	-36.40%	5,648
McDonough	4,497	33.03%	9,028	66.30%	91	0.67%	-4,531	-33.28%	13,616
McHenry	5,567	26.14%	15,666	73.55%	66	0.31%	-10,099	-47.42%	21,299
McLean	14,011	41.75%	19,366	57.70%	185	0.55%	-5,355	-15.96%	33,562
Menard	1,888	38.33%	3,013	61.17%	25	0.51%	-1,125	-22.84%	4,926
Mercer	3,277	36.50%	5,667	63.12%	34	0.38%	-2,390	-26.62%	8,978
Monroe	2,068	33.85%	4,032	66.00%	9	0.15%	-1,964	-32.15%	6,109
Montgomery	7,855	46.08%	8,989	52.74%	201	1.18%	-1,134	-6.65%	17,045
Morgan	6,965	43.72%	8,923	56.01%	42	0.26%	-1,958	-12.29%	15,930
Moultrie	2,853	46.93%	3,180	52.31%	46	0.76%	-327	-5.38%	6,079
Ogle	3,951	26.86%	10,680	72.59%	81	0.55%	-6,729	-45.74%	14,712
Peoria	32,837	48.83%	34,171	50.81%	243	0.36%	-1,334	-1.98%	67,251
Perry	4,677	42.73%	6,236	56.97%	33	0.30%	-1,559	-14.24%	10,946
Piatt	2,641	40.09%	3,912	59.38%	35	0.53%	-1,271	-19.29%	6,588
Pike	5,833	50.58%	5,633	48.85%	66	0.57%	200	1.73%	11,532
Pope	813	25.74%	2,305	72.99%	40	1.27%	-1,492	-47.25%	3,158
Pulaski	2,311	41.28%	3,248	58.02%	39	0.70%	-937	-16.74%	5,598
Putnam	865	36.10%	1,521	63.48%	10	0.42%	-656	-27.38%	2,396
Randolph	6,199	45.06%	7,518	54.65%	39	0.28%	-1,319	-9.59%	13,756
Richland	2,858	38.04%	4,577	60.91%	79	1.05%	-1,719	-22.88%	7,514
Rock Island	30,102	55.48%	23,980	44.19%	180	0.33%	6,122	11.28%	54,262
Saline	7,351	44.45%	9,083	54.92%	105	0.63%	-1,732	-10.47%	16,539
Sangamon	28,713	46.50%	32,871	53.24%	161	0.26%	-4,158	-6.73%	61,745
Schuyler	2,555	47.27%	2,801	51.82%	49	0.91%	-246	-4.55%	5,405
Scott	1,864	45.93%	2,185	53.84%	9	0.22%	-321	-7.91%	4,058
Shelby	5,919	48.35%	6,201	50.65%	123	1.00%	-282	-2.30%	12,243
St. Clair	48,325	58.78%	33,557	40.82%	327	0.40%	14,768	17.96%	82,209
Stark	1,401	31.43%	3,050	68.42%	7	0.16%	-1,649	-36.99%	4,458
Stephenson	7,755	39.13%	11,948	60.28%	118	0.60%	-4,193	-21.15%	19,821
Tazewell	14,412	53.30%	12,531	46.34%	96	0.36%	1,881	6.96%	27,039
Union	4,367	51.21%	4,114	48.25%	46	0.54%	253	2.97%	8,527
Vermilion	18,387	46.60%	20,794	52.70%	273	0.69%	-2,407	-6.10%	39,454
Wabash	3,026	45.83%	3,496	52.95%	81	1.23%	-470	-7.12%	6,603
Warren	3,926	35.53%	7,085	64.12%	39	0.35%	-3,159	-28.59%	11,050
Washington	2,723	33.26%	5,428	66.31%	35	0.43%	-2,705	-33.04%	8,186
Wayne	4,019	41.17%	5,683	58.21%	61	0.62%	-1,664	-17.04%	9,763
White	4,822	47.97%	5,139	51.12%	91	0.91%	-317	-3.15%	10,052
Whiteside	5,555	27.93%	14,162	71.21%	171	0.86%	-8,607	-43.28%	19,888
Will	27,085	47.14%	30,058	52.32%	310	0.54%	-2,973	-5.17%	57,453
Williamson	9,974	43.99%	12,594	55.55%	103	0.45%	-2,620	-11.56%	22,671
Winnebago	27,831	47.22%	30,837	52.31%	277	0.47%	-3,006	-5.10%	58,945
Woodford	3,514	35.90%	6,237	63.73%	36	0.37%	-2,723	-27.82%	9,787
Totals	2,079,479	51.52%	1,939,314	48.05%	17,088	0.42%	140,165	3.47%	4,035,881

==== Counties that flipped from Democratic to Republican ====
- Coles
- Alexander
- Effingham
- LaSalle
- Moultrie
- Peoria
- Saline
- Schuyler
- Shelby
- Williamson
- Wabash
- White

== See also ==
- United States presidential elections in Illinois
