= 1946 New York gubernatorial election =

- November 5, 1946
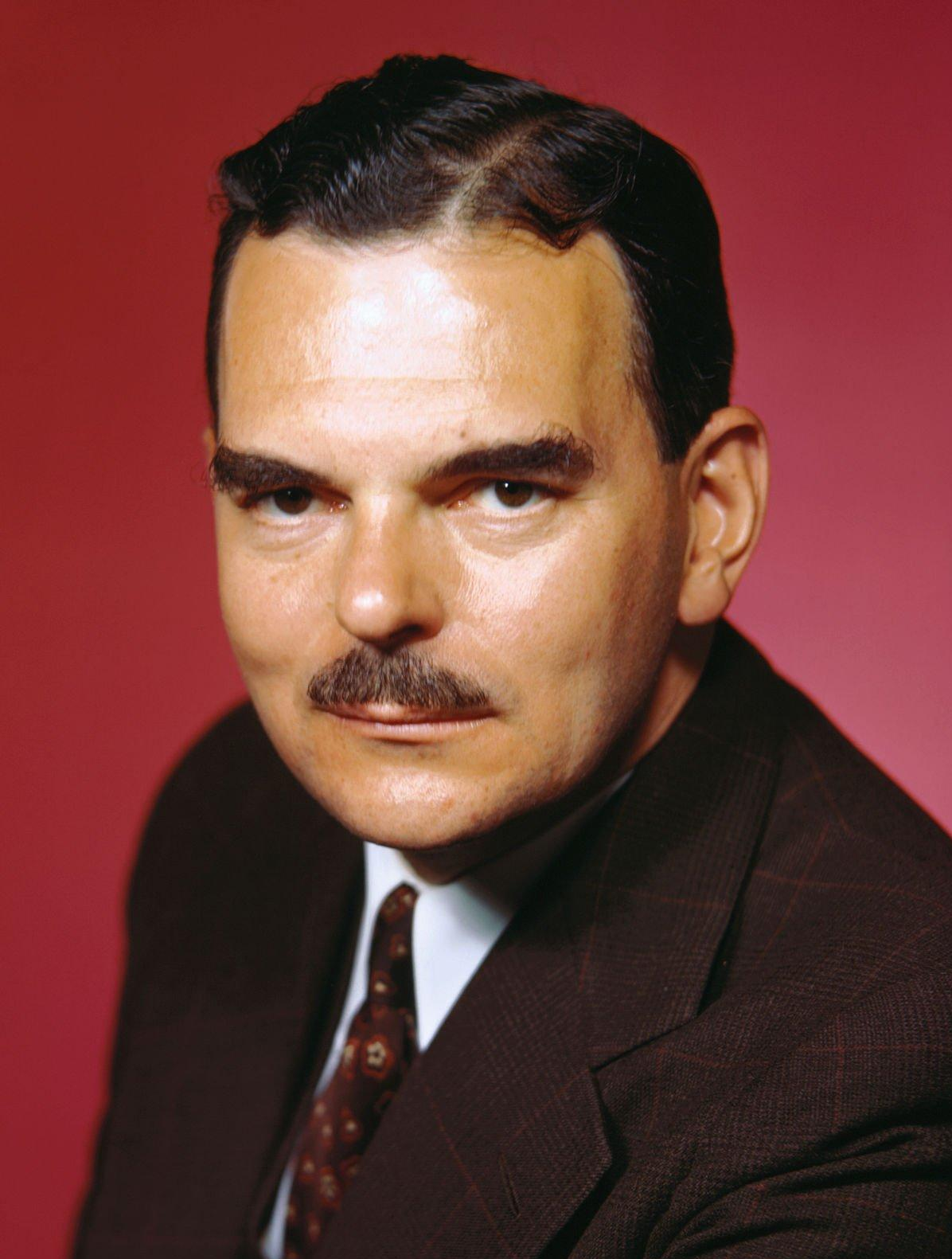

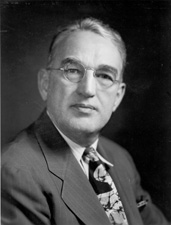
Nominee	Thomas E. Dewey	James M. Mead
Party	Republican	Democratic
Alliance		American Labor; Liberal
Popular vote	2,825,633	2,138,482
Percentage	56.92%	43.08%
- County results Dewey: 50–60% 60–70% 70–80% 80–90% Mead: 50–60% 60–70%
Governor before election
Thomas E. Dewey
Republican
Elected Governor
Thomas E. Dewey
Republican

The 1946 New York gubernatorial election was held on November 5, 1946, to elect the Governor of New York. Incumbent Republican governor Thomas E. Dewey was re-elected to a second term in office, defeating U.S. Senator James M. Mead.

== Republican nomination ==
=== Candidates ===
- Thomas E. Dewey, incumbent governor since 1943

=== Results ===
Dewey was nominated for re-election to a second term at the state convention met on September 4 at Saratoga Springs.

== American Labor, Liberal, and Democratic nominations ==
=== Candidates ===
- James M. Mead, incumbent U.S. senator since 1938 and candidate for governor in 1942

=== Campaign ===
U.S. Senator James M. Mead, who had contested lost the Democratic nomination in 1942 to John J. Bennett Jr. at the state convention, was an early favorite for 1946. By December 1945, he had secured the support of most upstate county chairs, who had formed the base of Bennett's support in 1942. Nevertheless, party chairman Paul E. Fitzgerald and James Farley opposed his campaign again. Farley reiterated his opposition in April, accusing Mead of "plain, unadulterated deceit" and lacking "the stability and forthrightness to be Governor." He declared Mead was "afraid of the job and his fear was warranted" and that Mead would be easily defeated by Dewey or, if elected a "terrible Governor."

=== Results ===
The Liberal Party filed a ticket of candidates by petition on September 2. Mead, as the presumptive Democratic nominee, was nominated for governor.

At the American Labor state convention was held at the Hotel New Yorker on September 3. The party endorsed Mead and a slate of placeholder candidates intended to be replaced with the Democratic ticket. Although the intraparty union nearly broke down after the convention learned that the Democrats intended to endorse a Liberal for judge in Brooklyn, the strife did not implicate Mead, who was nominated outright.

At the Democratic state convention on September 4 in Albany, the party nominated Mead for governor unanimously. Mead was put into nomination by Robert F. Wagner Jr., who read a speech from his father and Mead's colleague, Robert F. Wagner. In his acceptance speech, Mead pledged a return to the policies of Al Smith, Franklin D. Roosevelt, and Herbert H. Lehman and rejected support from "any fascist, any communist, and any member or friend of the Ku Klux Klan".

== General election ==
=== Candidates ===
- Thomas E. Dewey, incumbent Governor since 1943 (Republican)
- James M. Mead, incumbent U.S. Senator since 1938 (Democratic, American Labor and Liberal)

The Industrial Government, Socialist and Socialist Workers tickets were not allowed on the ballot because of "defective nominating petitions." The Court of Appeals upheld the decisions of the lower courts.

=== Results ===
1946 New York gubernatorial election
Party	Candidate	Votes	%	±%
Republican	Thomas E. Dewey (incumbent)	2,825,633	56.92%	
Democratic	James M. Mead	1,532,161	30.86%	
American Labor	James M. Mead	428,903	8.64%	
Liberal	James M. Mead	177,418	3.57%	
Total	James M. Mead	2,138,482	43.08%	
Total votes		4,964,115	100.00%	
