= Cupido (surname) =

Cupido is a surname. Notable people with the surname include:

- Ashley Cupido (born 2001), South African soccer player
- Damian Cupido (born 1982), Australian rules footballer
- Gino Cupido (born 2005), South African rugby union player
- Hendry Cupido, South African politician
- Joey Cupido (born 1990), Canadian lacrosse player
- John Cupido (born 1976), South African politician
- Keanu Cupido (born 1998), South African footballer
- Luca Cupido (born 1995), Italian-born American Olympic water polo player
- Michela Cupido (born 1978), Italian footballer
- Paul Cupido (born 1972), Dutch fine art photographer
- Pauline Cupido, South African politician

== See also ==
- Cupido (disambiguation)
