= Cupido =

Cupido may refer to:

== Biology ==
- Cupido (butterfly), a genus of butterflies
- Biotodoma cupido, a species of cichlid
- Tympanuchus cupido, the North American greater prairie chicken

== Music ==
- Cupido (group), a Spanish band that released the 2019 song "Autoestima"
- Cupido (album), a 2023 album by Tini
  - "Cupido" (Tini song)
- "Cupido" (Ivy Queen song), 2012
- "Cupido" (Sfera Ebbasta song), 2018
- "Cupido", a 1988 song by El Gran Combo de Puerto Rico from Romántico y Sabroso

== People ==
- Cupido (surname)

== Places ==
- Cupido, Suriname, an indigenous village near Wageningen
- Cúpido Formation a geologic formation in Mexico
- Cupido River, Espírito Santo, Brazil

== Other uses ==
- Cupid, or Cupīdō, the Roman god of love
- Cupido, a character in the Battle Arena Toshinden fighting game series
- 763 Cupido, an asteroid

== See also ==
- Cupid (disambiguation)
- Cupidon (disambiguation)
