= Texas City Prairie Preserve =

Nature preserve in Texas, United States

- Location within Texas
- Location: Moses Lake, Texas, United States
- Nearest city: Texas City
- Coordinates: 29°27′N 94°57′W
- Governing body: Nature Conservancy

The Texas City Prairie Preserve is a 2,300-acre (9.3 km^{2}) nature preserve located on the shores of Moses Lake and Galveston Bay in Texas City, Texas, in the United States, near Houston. The preserve was created in 1995 by the Nature Conservancy thanks to a $2.2 million donation of land by ExxonMobil. The primary goal in creating the preserve was to save the endangered Attwater's prairie chicken, though the preserve protects coastal prairie and supports a wide variety of wildlife.

The terrain of the preserve includes prairie and wetland habitats, enabled in large part by restoration efforts in recent decades. The preserve includes 40 acres (0.16 km^{2}) of limited public access areas including a small hiking trail. The remainder of the preserve is closed but available for tours and access at the discretion of preserve staff, including birding events and volunteer events.

The preserve is part of the Great Texas Coastal Birding Trail, a network of preserves and trails along the Texas coast featuring habitats for birds and other wildlife.

== Controversy ==
In 1999, the Nature Conservancy permitted new oil drilling on the property, intending to use the resulting funds to support prairie chicken conservation efforts. In the view of some organizations, including the Wildlife Society, the drilling harmed the prairie-chicken population at that location. The Nature Conservancy stated several years later that it had banned new drilling or mining on its lands, but was advised that it would not legally be able to overturn the 1999 agreement which allowed a new well to be drilled. In 2010 a paper was presented at a Society of Petroleum Engineers conference stating that the original well "died in March 2003, and was unable to flow due to excessive water production." A new well was drilled in the same area in late 2007, the new well was for oil while the original was for natural gas.

Due to a change in release strategy by the Attwater's Prairie Chicken Recovery Team, captive-bred bird releases were stopped in 2011. There are no more Attwater's prairie chickens on the land as of 2012.
