= Cupidon =

Cupidon may refer to:

- Cupid (known as Cupidon in French), a god of classical mythology
- Cupidon (comics), a Belgian comics series by Malik and Raoul Cauvin
- Cupidon (1875), a painting by William-Adolphe Bouguereau
- Georgie Cupidon (born 1981), male badminton player from Seychelles
- Cupidon Mouse, a children's television programme which is produced and broadcast by the BBC.

== See also ==
- Cupid (disambiguation)
- Cupido (disambiguation)
