= Attwater Prairie Chicken National Wildlife Refuge =

National Wildlife Refuge near Sealy, Texas

- IUCN category IV (habitat/species management area)
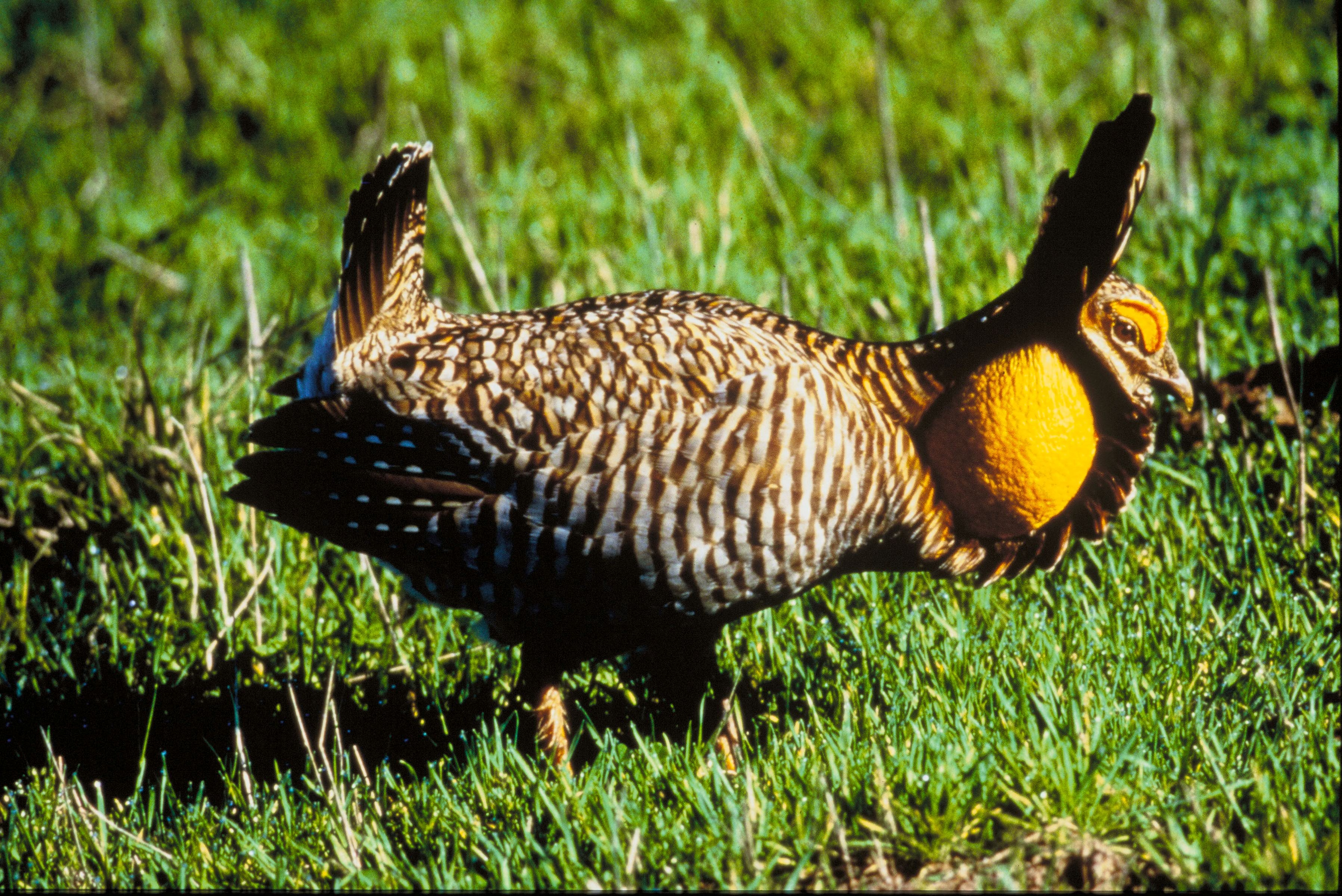
- Attwater's prairie chicken

- Location within the United States
- Location: Colorado County, Texas, United States
- Nearest city: Sealy, Texas
- Coordinates: 29°39′36″N 96°16′23″W
- Area: 10,528 acres (42.61 km^{2})
- Established: 1972
- Governing body: U.S. Fish and Wildlife Service
- Website: Attwater Prairie Chicken National Wildlife Refuge

U.S. National Natural Landmark
- Designated: 1968

Attwater Prairie Chicken National Wildlife Refuge is a federally protected refugium encompassing one of the largest remnants of coastal prairie habitat remaining in southeast Texas, United States, and home to one of the last populations of critically endangered Attwater's prairie chickens, a ground-dwelling grouse of the coastal prairie ecosystem.

The 10,528-acre (43-km^{2}) refuge, located in eastern Colorado County, about 60 miles (100 km) west of Houston, Texas, was established in 1972, and is one of a handful of national wildlife refuges managed specifically for an endangered species. In 1968, Attwater Prairie Chicken Preserve was designated as a National Natural Landmark by the National Park Service.

In the mid-1960s, the World Wildlife Fund purchased 3,500 acres (14 km^{2}) of land to preserve some remaining coastal prairie for Attwater's prairie chicken. The land was transferred to the United States Fish and Wildlife Service in 1972, which brought the refuge up to its current acreage.

Many of the Attwater's prairie chickens in the refuge are hatched at captive-breeding programs at Fossil Rim Wildlife Center, Texas A&M University, SeaWorld San Antonio, Abilene Zoo, Caldwell Zoo, Houston Zoo, and San Antonio Zoo. Chicks are fitted with a radio transmitter and released at the refuge once they are capable of independent survival.

To maintain the prairie ecosystem, the refuge staff does prescribed burns of 2,000 to 3,000 acres (8.1 to 12.1 km^{2}) annually in January or February. The burns help invigorate the grasses by removing dead stems, and control the growth of brush and invasive species of plants. The staff also converts formerly cultivated land in the refuge back to prairie by replanting native grasses.

Over 250 species of birds in addition to Attwater's prairie chicken have been observed in the refuge. Some of these include the fulvous whistling duck, black-bellied whistling duck, white-tailed hawk, crested caracara, scissor-tailed flycatcher, dickcissel, roseate spoonbill, anhinga, Sprague's pipit, and sandhill crane. Mammals in the refuge include plains bison, thirteen-lined ground squirrel, bobcat, coyote, nine-banded armadillo, and white-tailed deer. American alligators share the ponds with softshell turtles. American bullfrog and upland chorus frog calls are heard in the refuge.

Indian paintbrush, bluebonnets, and butterfly milkweed are some of the many wildflowers that bloom in the park.

The refuge has an auto tour and two hiking trails. The auto tour loop winds through 5 miles (8 km) of coastal prairie habitat. The Pipit Trail to the Refuge Lake is 1.5 miles. The Sycamore Trail transects 1.2 miles (1.9 km) of coastal prairie and a section of forest in the Coushatta Creek bottomland.

The San Bernard River runs on the eastern boundary of the refuge.

== Attwater Prairie Chicken National Wildlife Refuge gallery ==
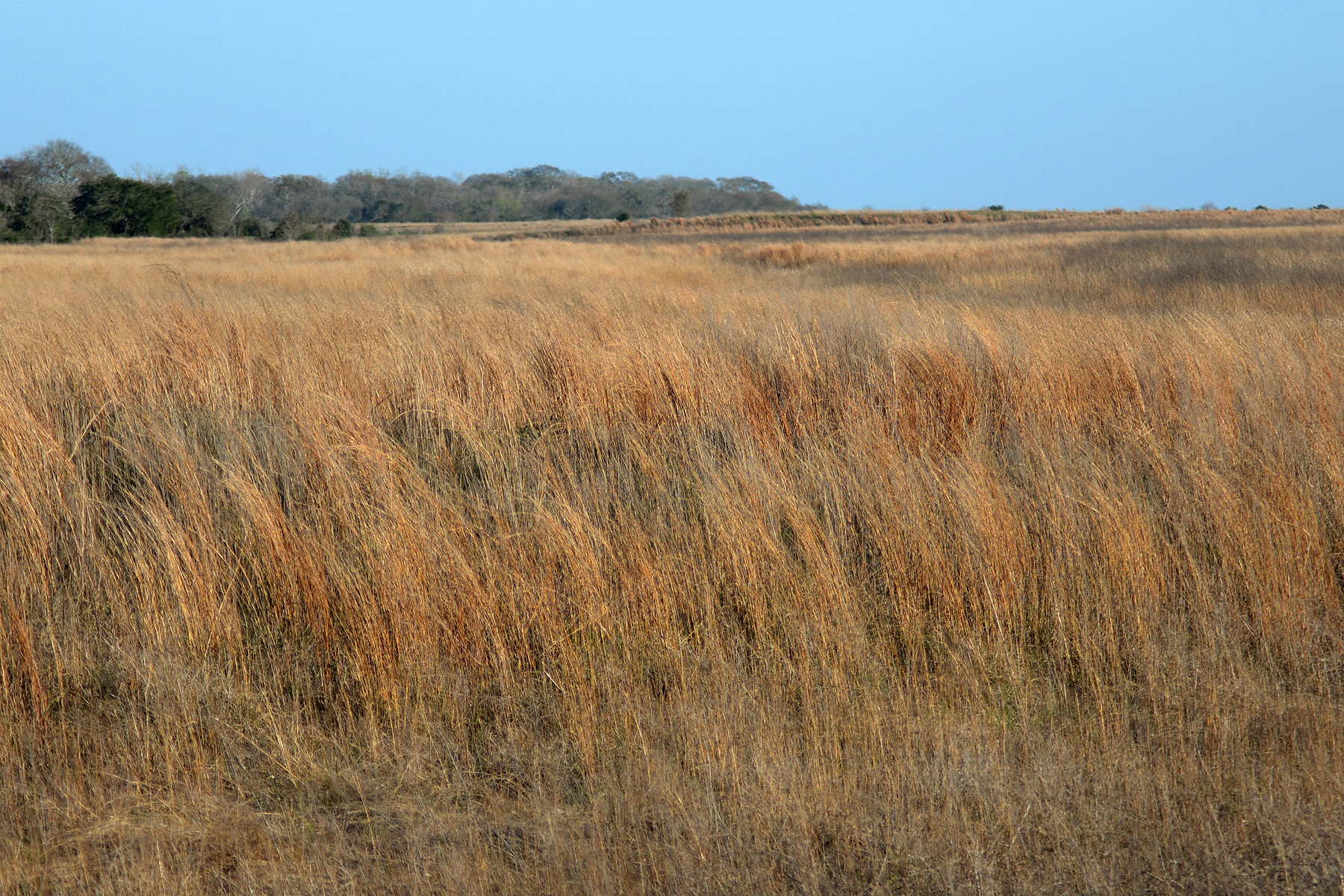
Attwater Prairie Chicken National Wildlife Refuge in February

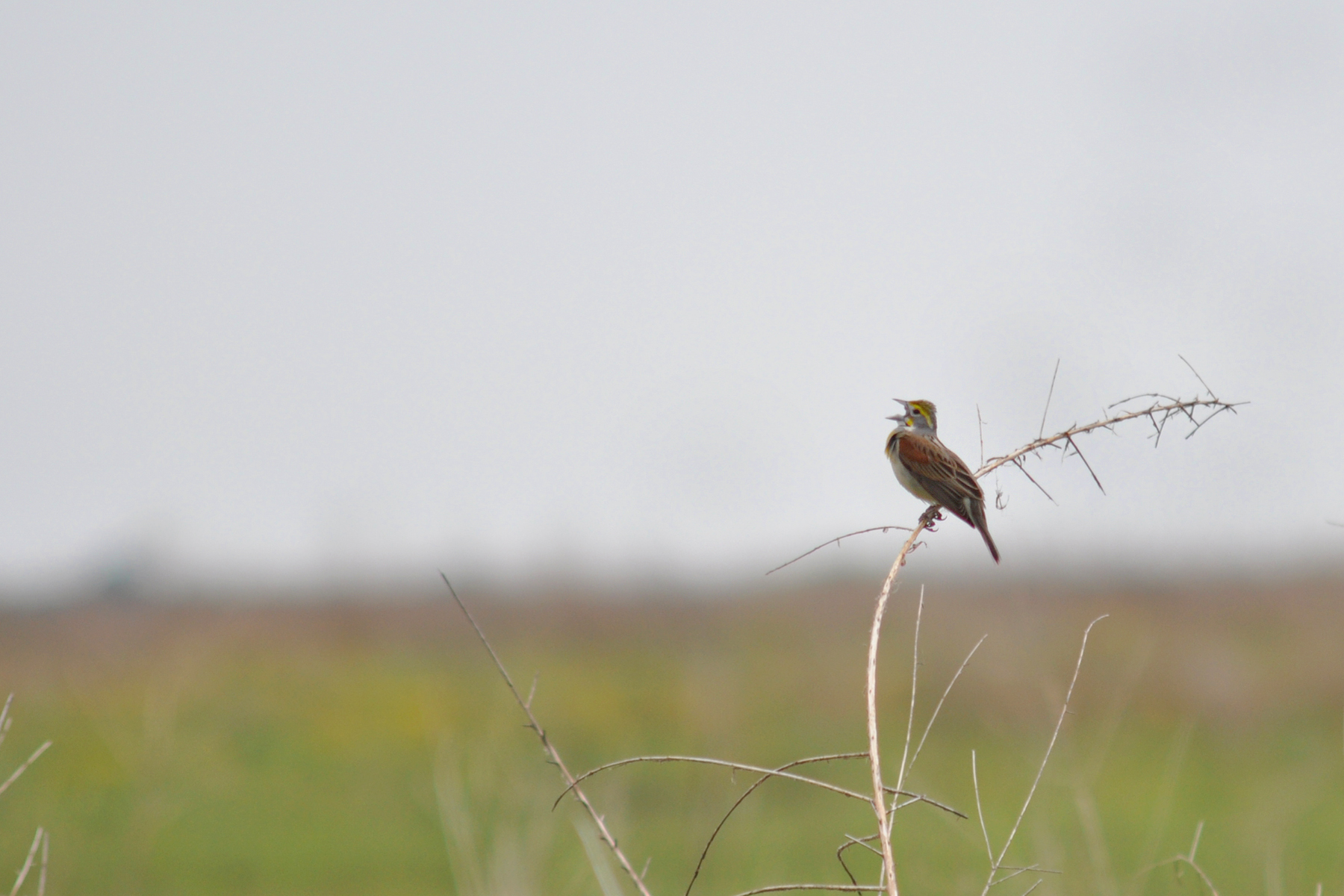
Dickcissel (Spiza americana), Attwater Prairie Chicken National Wildlife Refuge

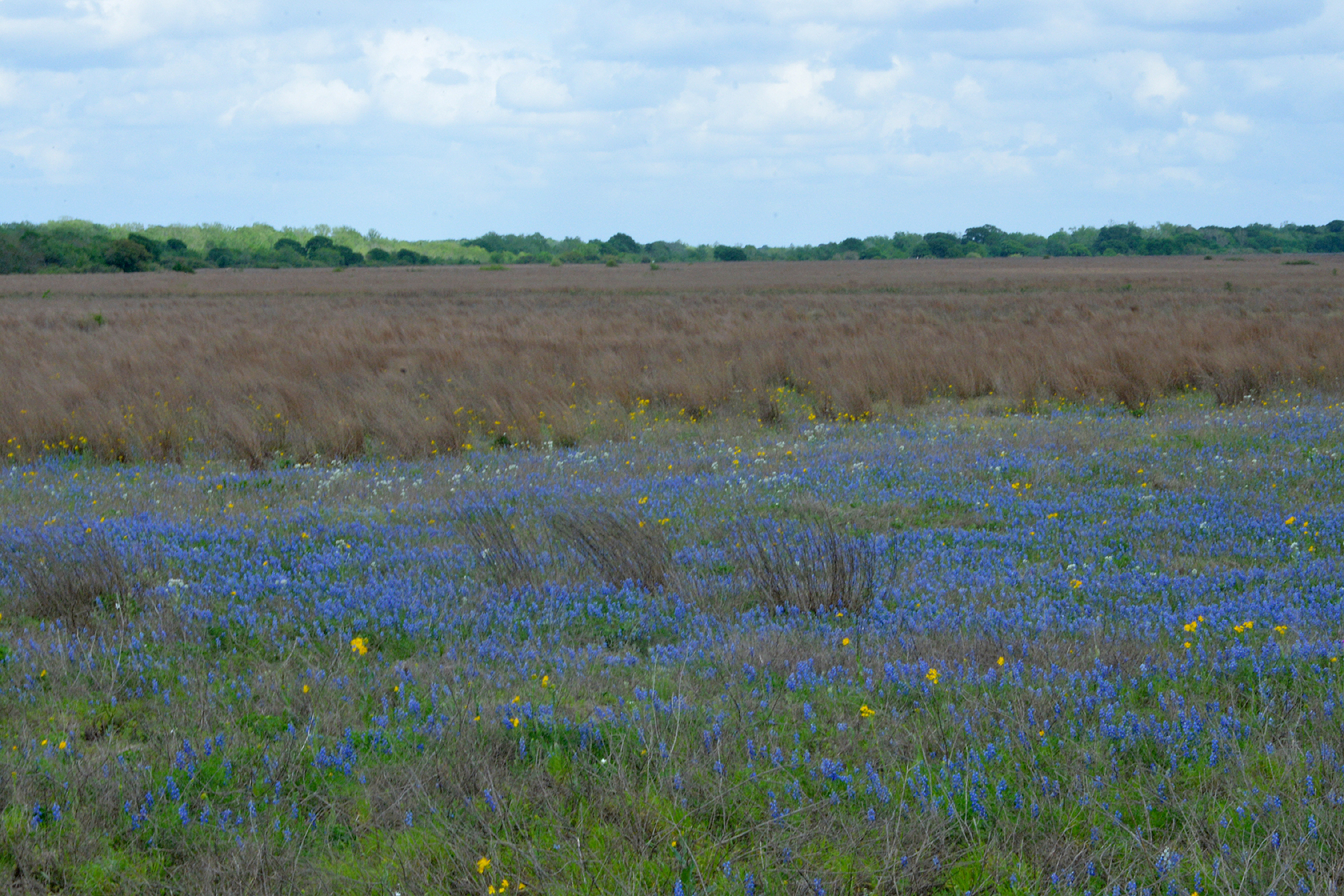
Texas bluebonnets (Lupinus texensis), Attwater Prairie Chicken National Wildlife Refuge

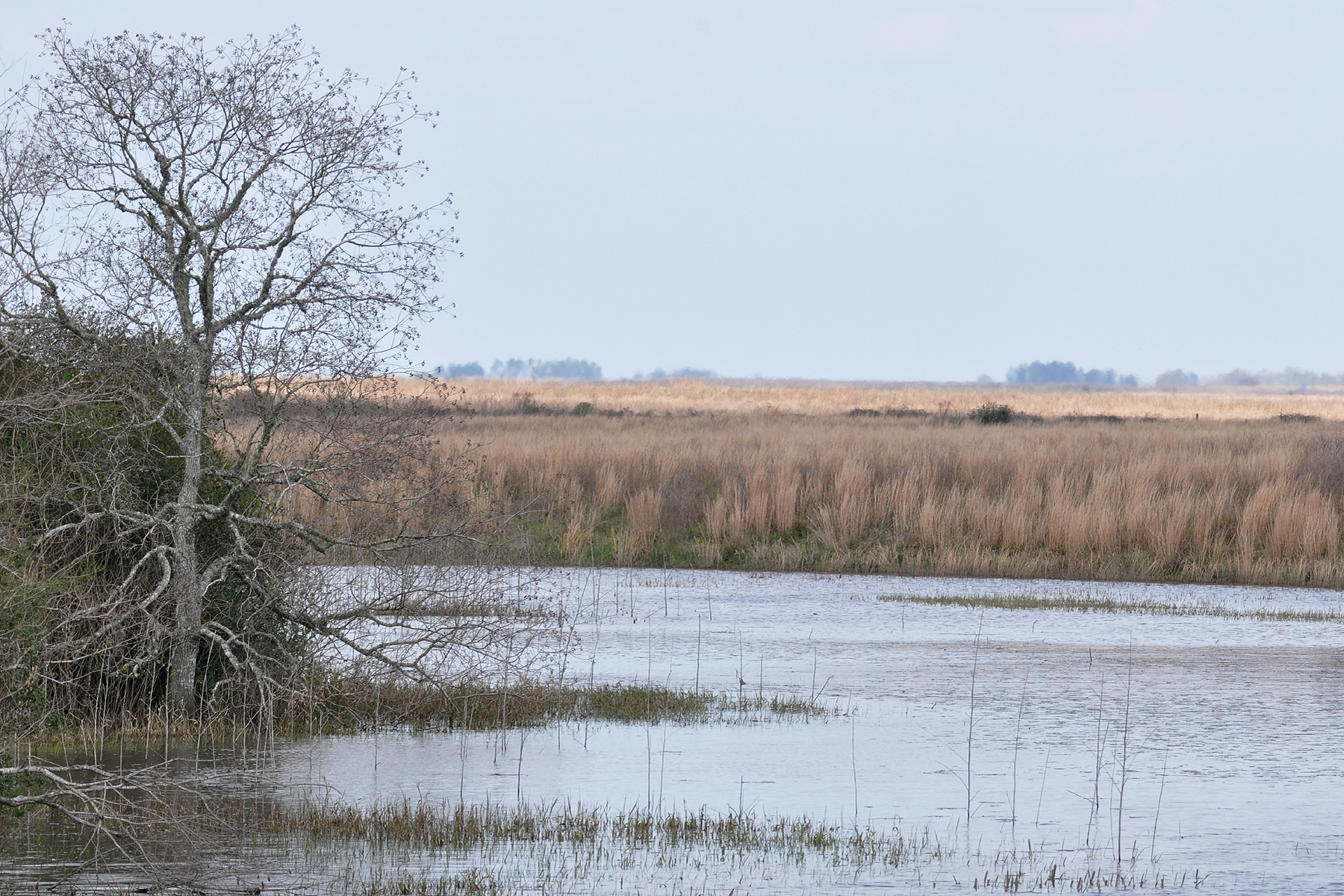
Refuge Lake in Attwater Prairie Chicken National Wildlife Refuge

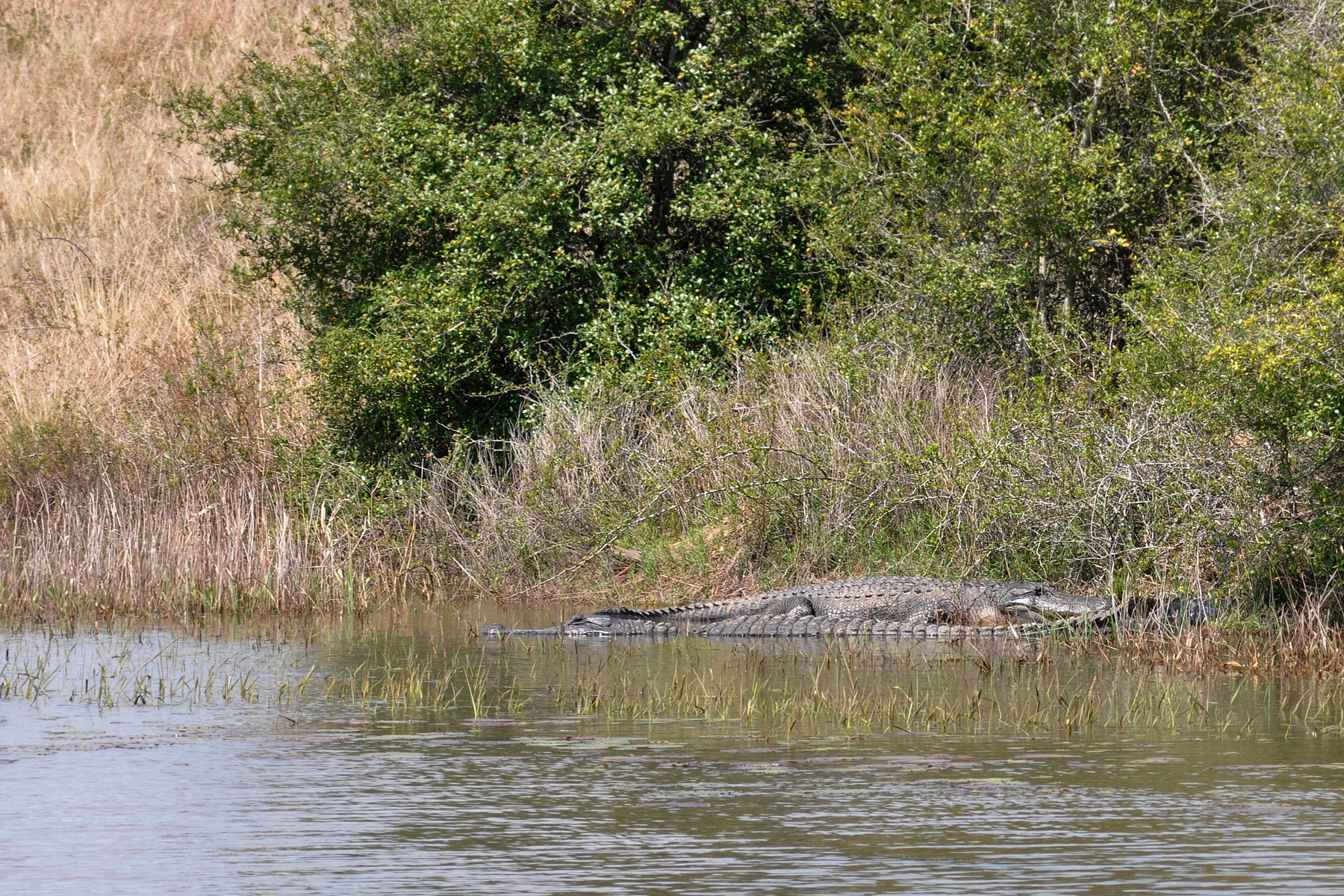
American alligators (Alligator mississippiensis), Attwater Prairie Chicken National Wildlife Refuge

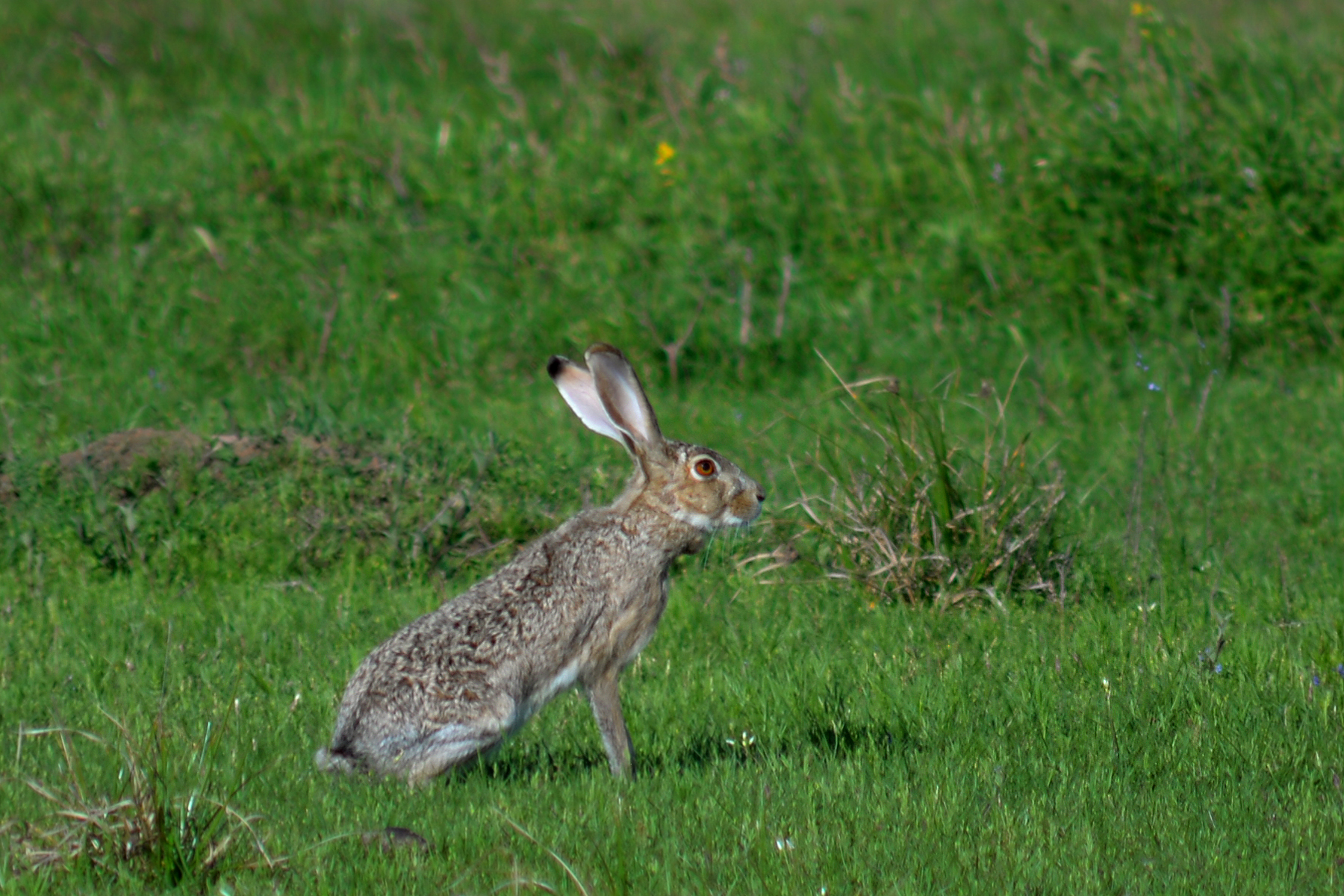
Black-tailed jackrabbit (Lepus californicus), Attwater Prairie Chicken National Wildlife Refuge

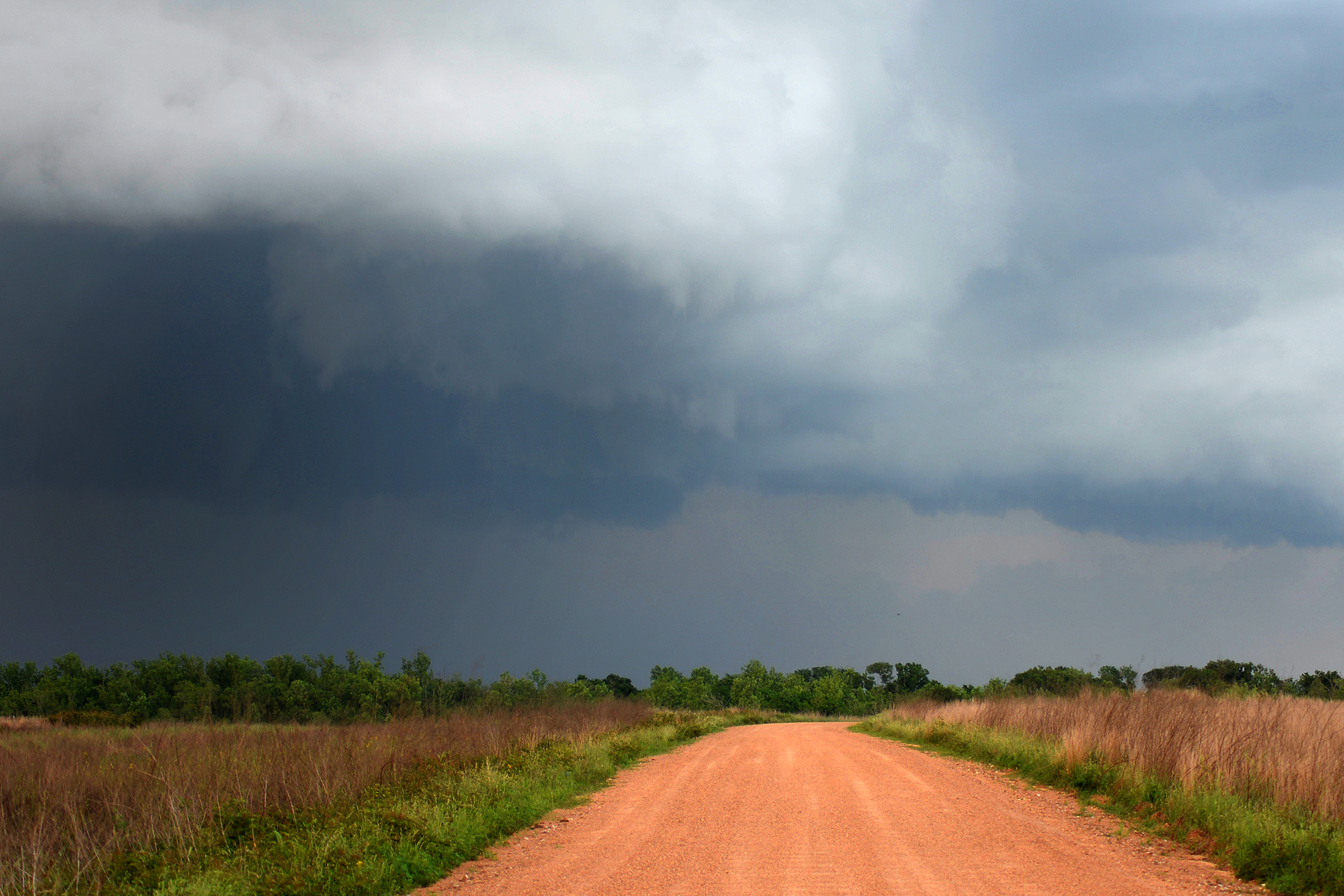
Attwater Prairie Chicken National Wildlife Refuge, April storm arriving

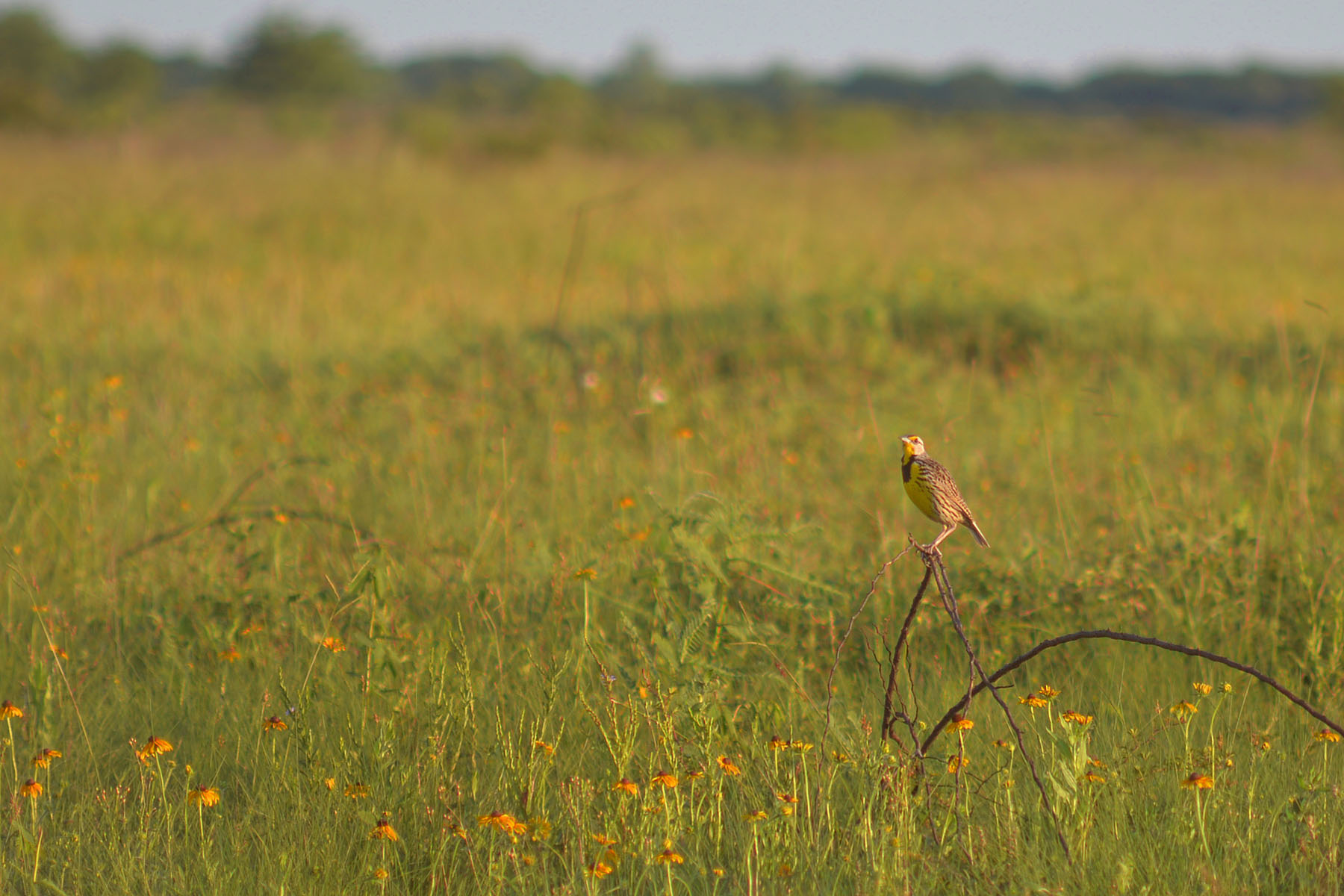
Meadowlark (Sturnella) Attwater Prairie Chicken National Wildlife Refuge

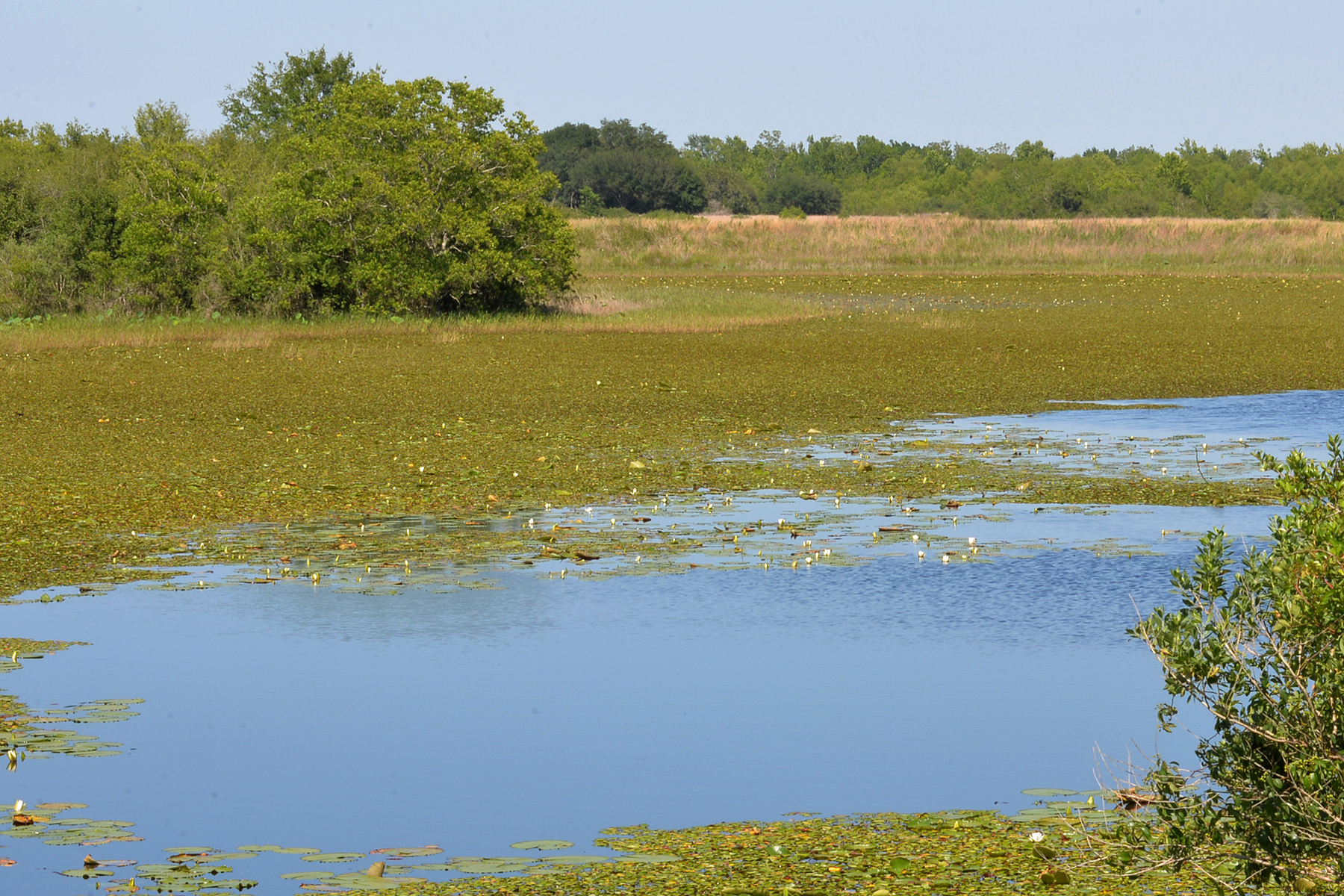
Refuge Lake, Attwater Prairie Chicken National Wildlife Refuge

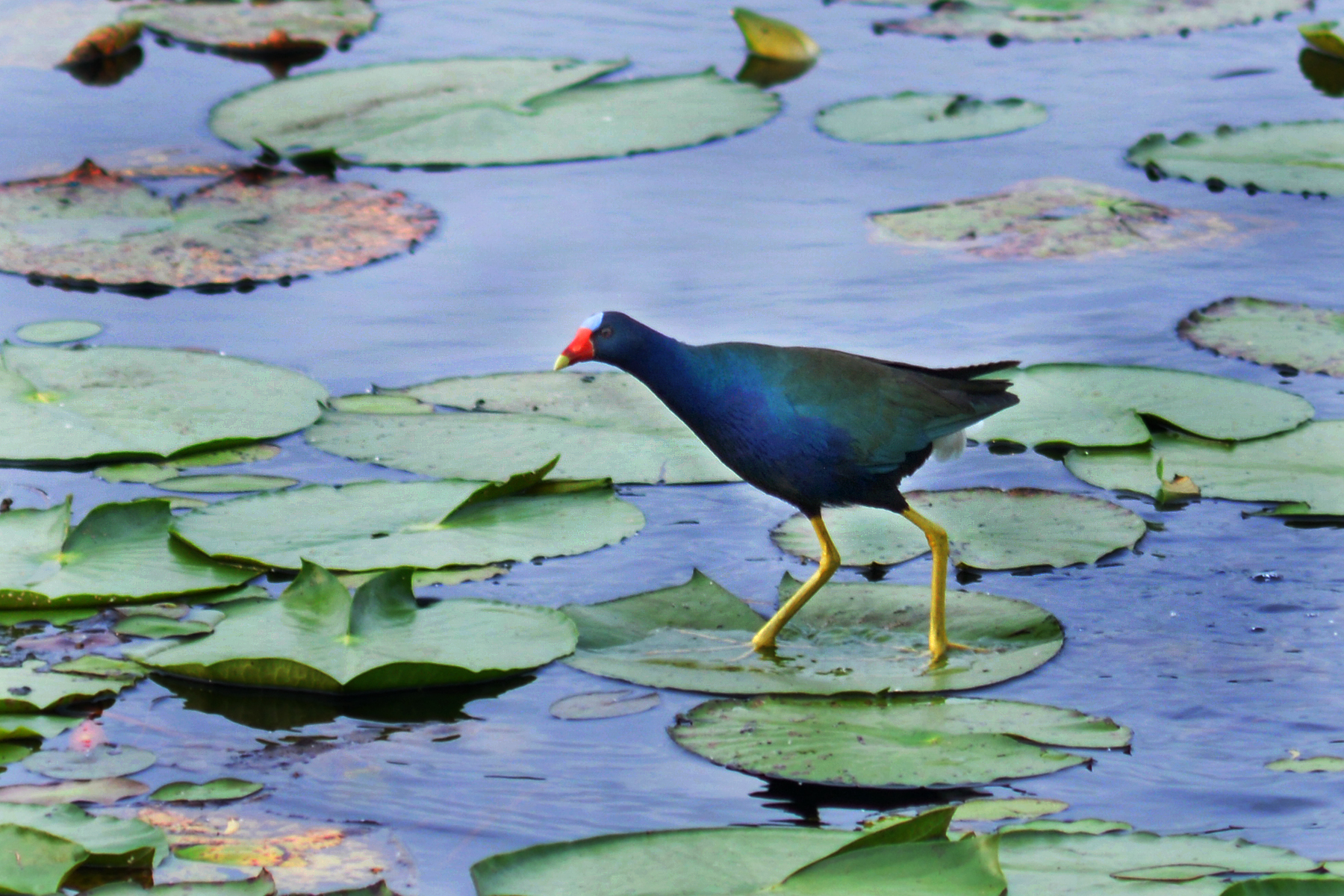
Purple gallinule (Porphyrio martinicus), Attwater Prairie Chicken National Wildlife Refuge

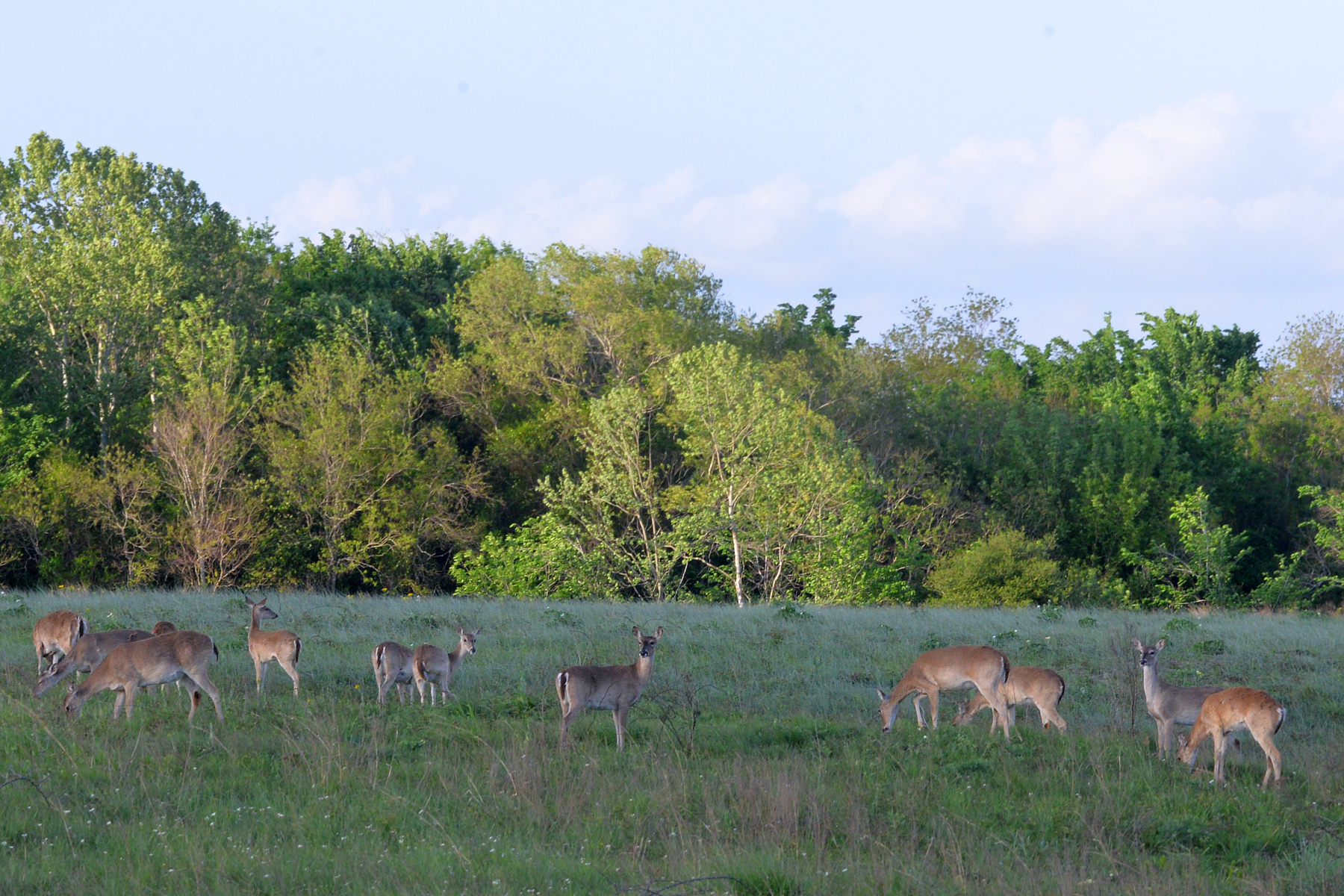
White-tailed deer (Odocoileus virginianus), Attwater Prairie Chicken National Wildlife Refuge

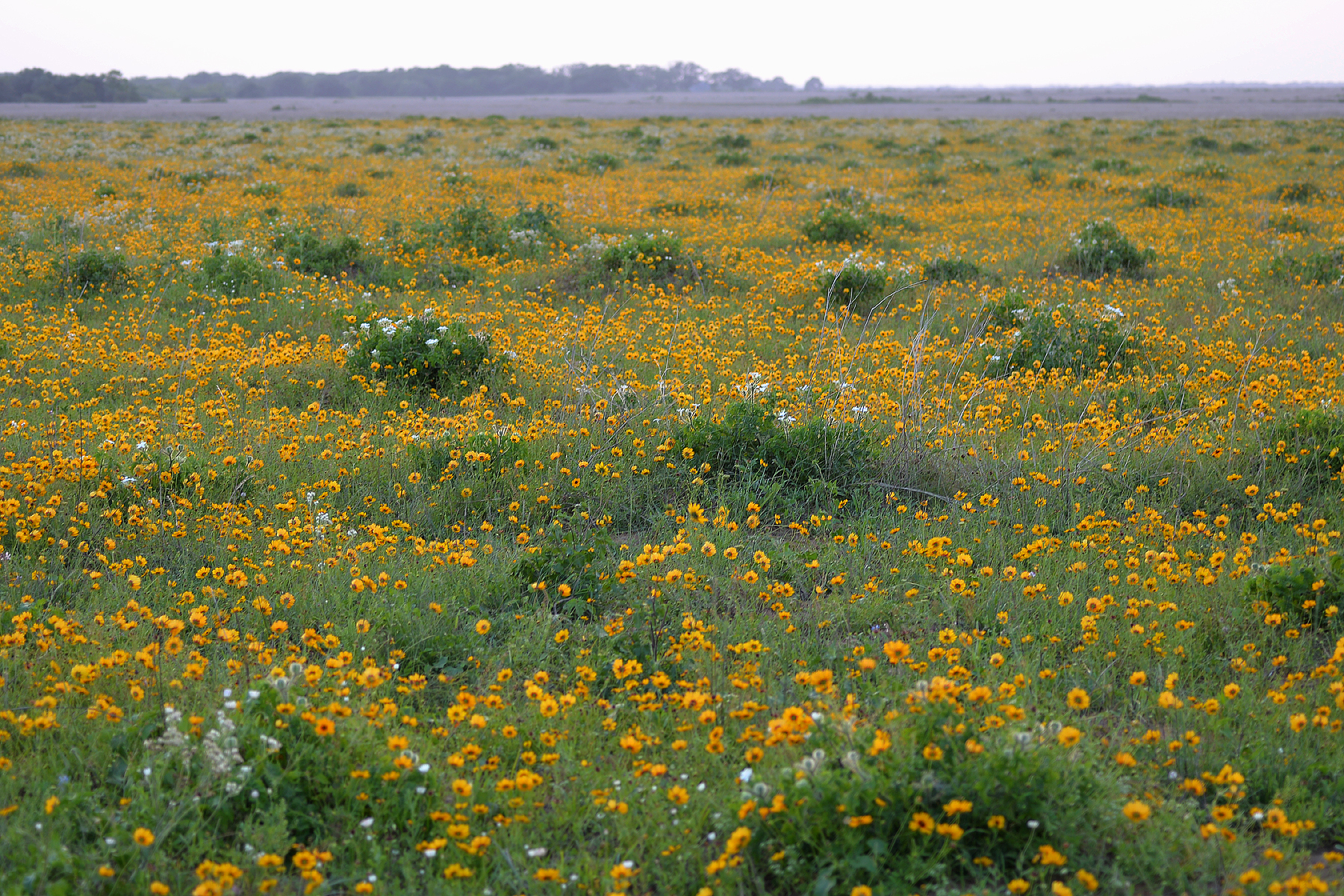
Texas bullnettle (Cnidoscolus texanus) and plains coreopsis (Coreopsis tinctoria), Attwater Prairie Chicken National Wildlife Refuge

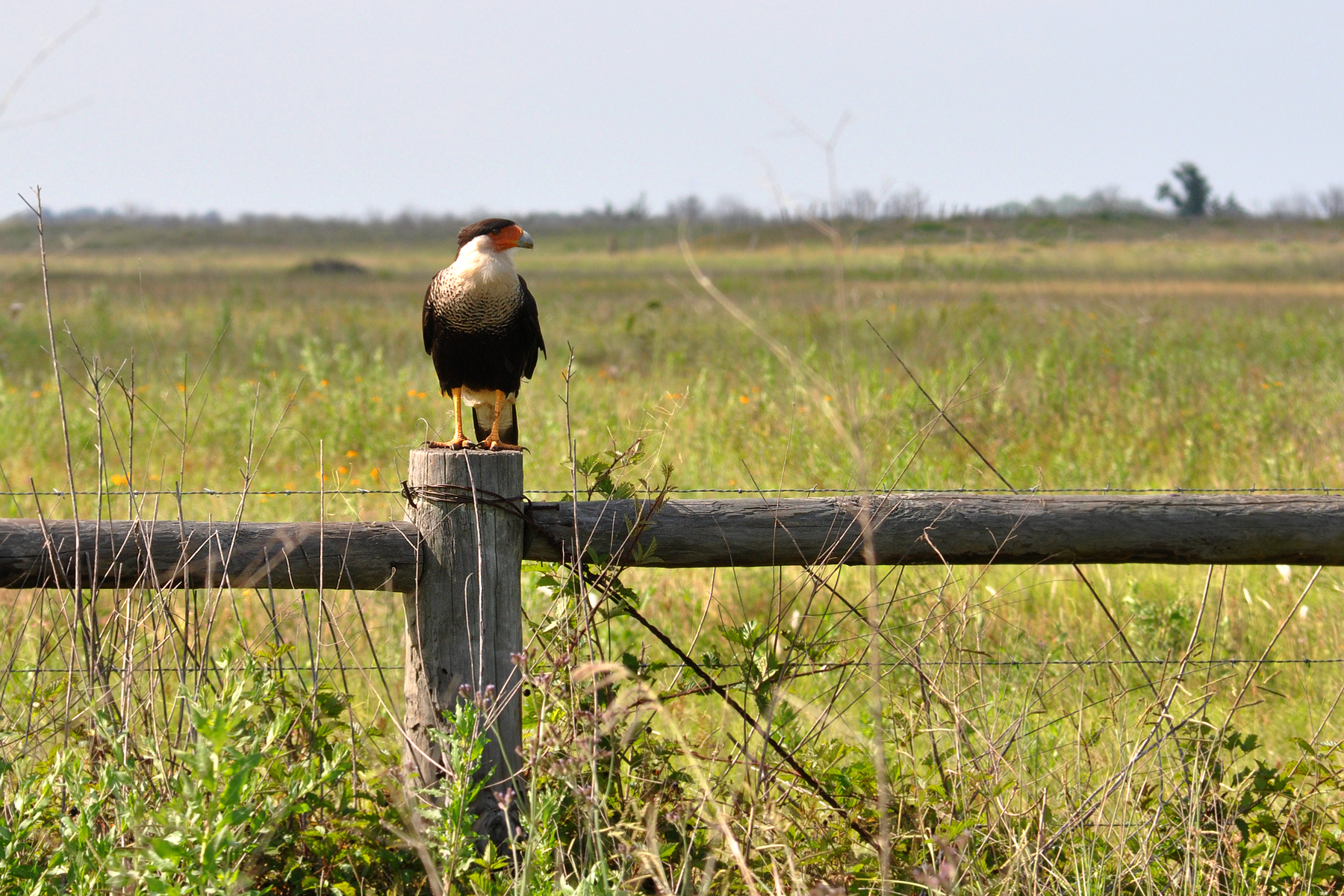
Northern crested caracara (Caracara cheriway), Attwater Prairie Chicken National Wildlife Refuge

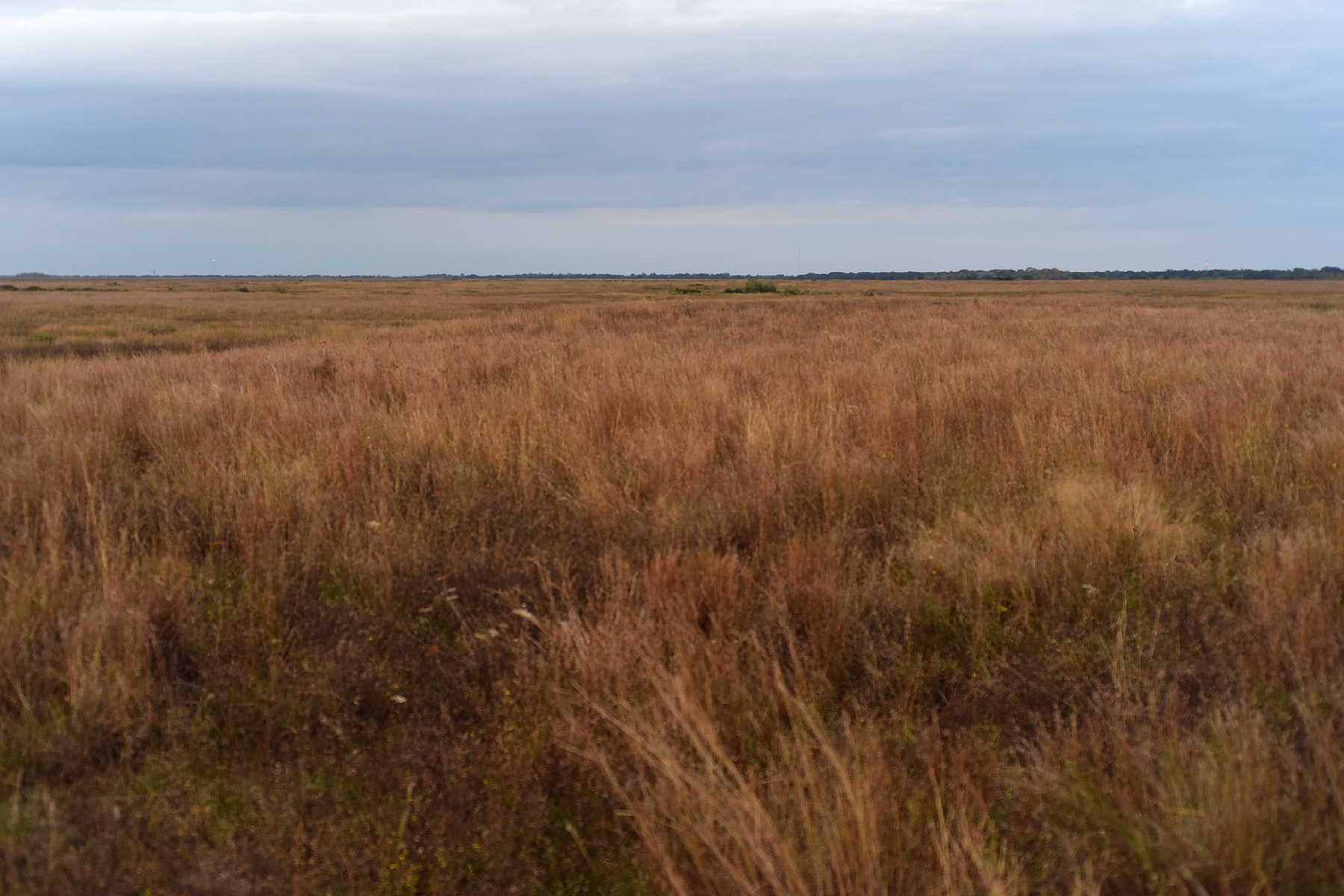
Attwater Prairie Chicken National Wildlife Refuge in November
