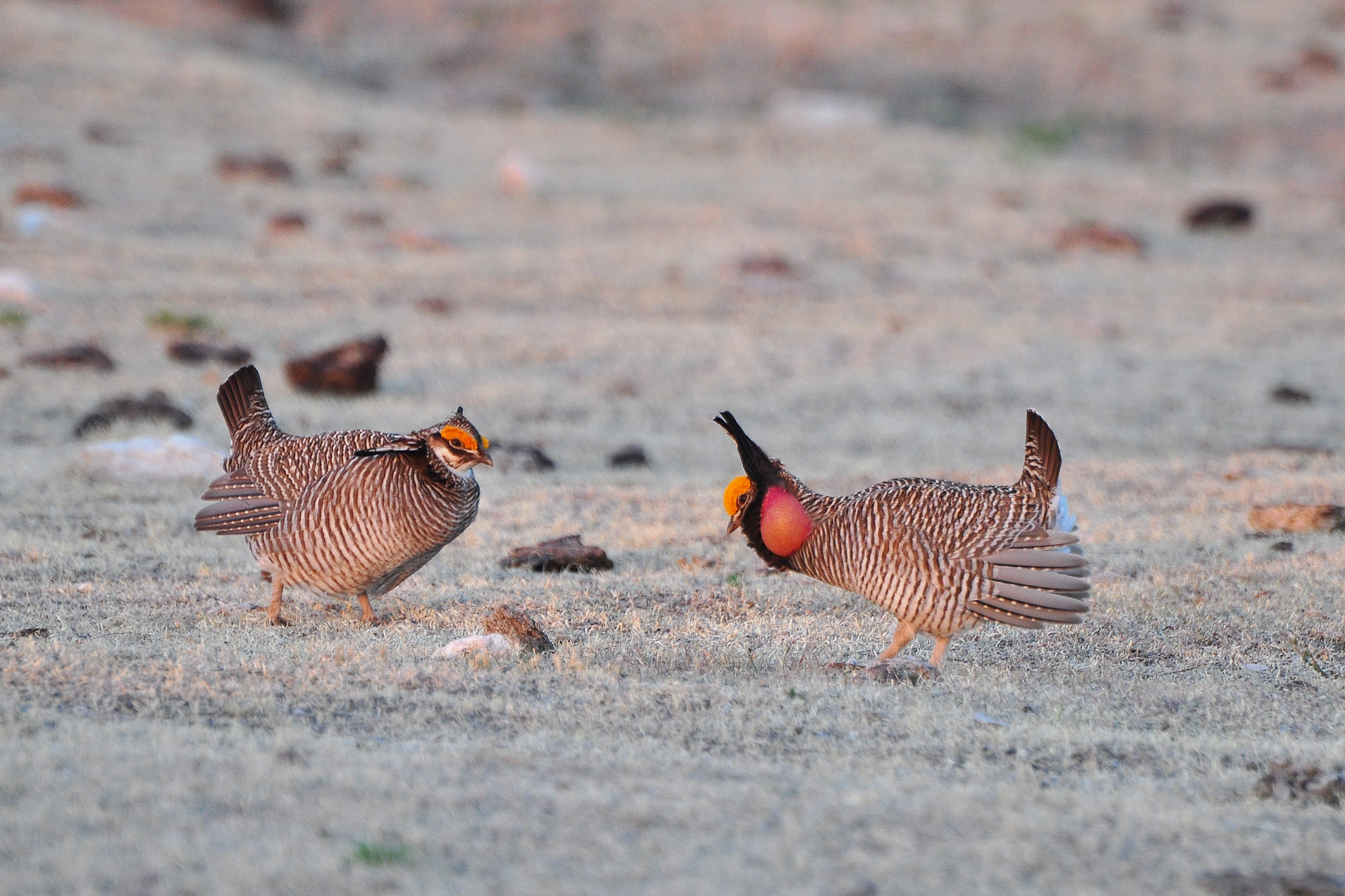
- Lesser prairie chickens (T. pallidicinctus); female on left, male on the right

Scientific classification
- Kingdom: Animalia
- Phylum: Chordata
- Class: Aves
- Order: Galliformes
- Family: Phasianidae
- Tribe: Tetraonini
- Genus: Tympanuchus; Gloger, 1841

Type species
- Tetrao cupido Linnaeus, 1758

Species
- Tympanuchus cupido Tympanuchus pallidicinctus Tympanuchus phasianellus

Synonyms
- Pedioecetes

= Tympanuchus =

Genus of birds

Tympanuchus is a small genus of birds in the grouse tribe. They are commonly referred to as prairie-chickens.

== Taxonomy ==
The genus Tympanuchus was introduced in 1841 by the German zoologist Constantin Wilhelm Lambert Gloger for the greater prairie chicken. The name combines the Ancient Greek tumpanon, meaning "kettle-drum", with ekhō meaning "to have".

The genus contains three species:

Genus Tympanuchus – Gloger, 1841 – three species
Common name	Scientific name and subspecies	Range	Size and ecology	IUCN status and estimated population
Sharp-tailed grouse	Tympanuchus phasianellus (Linnaeus, 1758) Seven subspecies: Tympanuchus phasianellus phasianellus; Tympanuchus phasianellus kennicotti; Tympanuchus phasianellus caurus; Columbian sharp-tailed grouse (Tympanuchus phasianellus columbianus); Tympanuchus phasianellus campestris; Tympanuchus phasianellus jamesi; †Tympanuchus phasianellus hueyi	north to Alaska, south to California and New Mexico, and east to Quebec, Canada	Size: Habitat: Diet:	LC
Greater prairie-chicken	Tympanuchus cupido (Linnaeus, 1758) Three subspecies: Heath hen (Tympanuchus cupido cupido; extinct); Attwater's prairie-chicken (Tympanuchus cupido attwateri); The greater prairie chicken, (Tympanuchus cupido pinnatus)	Central U.S., formerly to the Atlantic coast	Size: Habitat: Diet:	NT
Lesser prairie-chicken	Tympanuchus pallidicinctus (Ridgway, 1873)	western Oklahoma, the Texas Panhandle including the Llano Estacado, eastern New Mexico, and southeastern Colorado.	Size: Habitat: Diet:	VU

All three are among the smaller grouse, from 40 to 43 cm (16 to 17 in) in length. They are found in North America in different types of prairie. In courtship display on leks, males make hooting sounds and dance with the head extended straight forward, the tail up, and colorful neck sacs inflated (shown in the photograph at upper right). Tympanuchus comes from Ancient Greek roots and means "holding a drum"; it refers to the membranous neck sacs and the drum-like call of the greater prairie chicken.

The two prairie chickens are particularly closely related and look extremely similar. But their taxonomy and the evolutionary relationships of the Tympanuchus are yet to be discovered. There is still unknown information about these genera. But one thing we do know is that Tympanuchus are polyphyletic. They have a strong sexual selection (Galla, 2013).

They are commonly seen in the North American Prairies (Galla, 2013).

The extinct heath hen of the American East Coast, usually considered a subspecies of the greater prairie chicken, has been considered a separate species.

== Uses ==
An Englishman visiting the United States in the 1850s reported that prairie hens taste "like pheasants in flavour, but the flesh is the colour of grouse."
