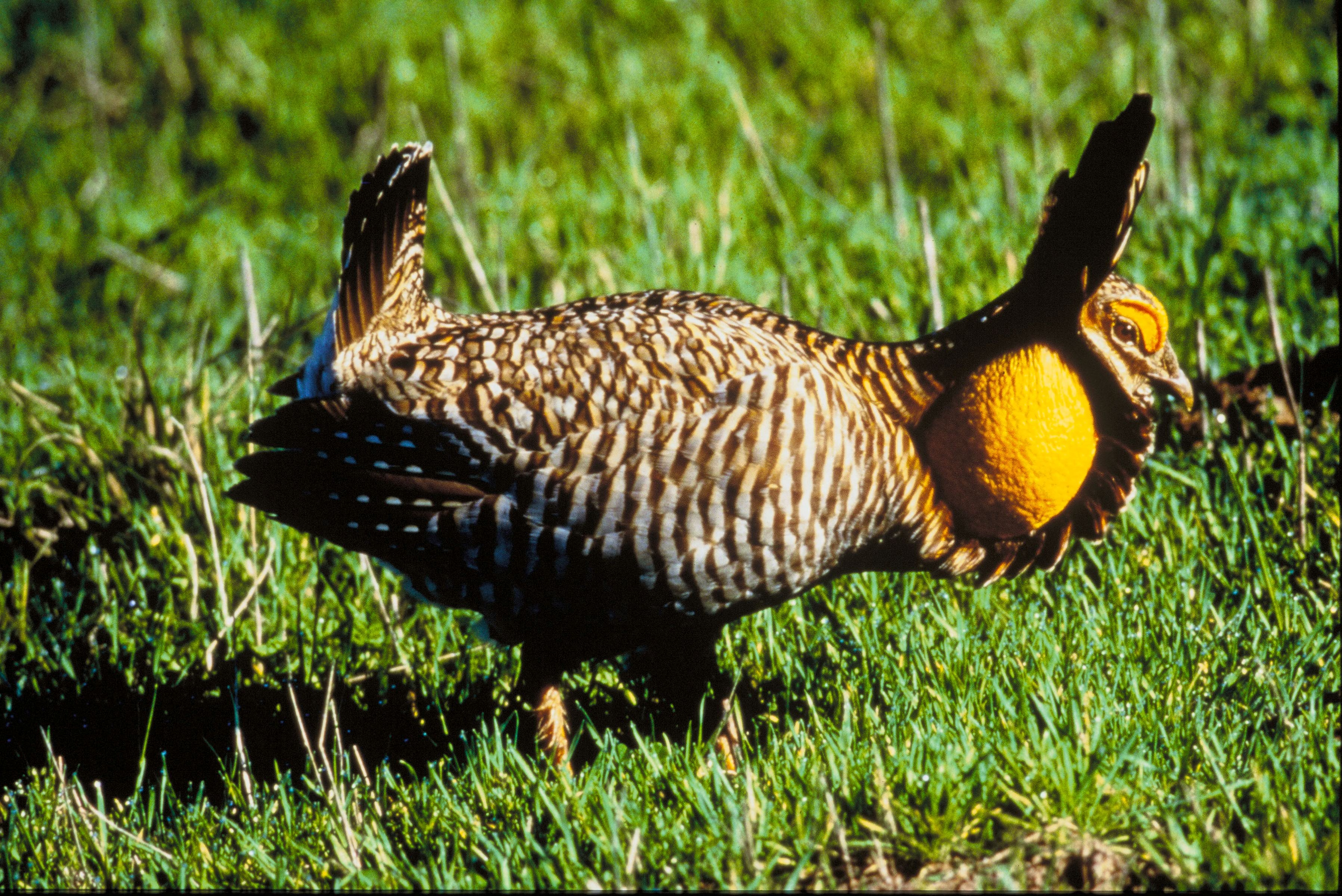

Conservation status
- Critically Imperiled (NatureServe)
- CITES Appendix II

Scientific classification
- Kingdom: Animalia
- Phylum: Chordata
- Class: Aves
- Order: Galliformes
- Family: Phasianidae
- Genus: Tympanuchus
- Species: T. cupido
- Subspecies: T. c. attwateri

Trinomial name
- Tympanuchus cupido attwateri Bendire, 1893
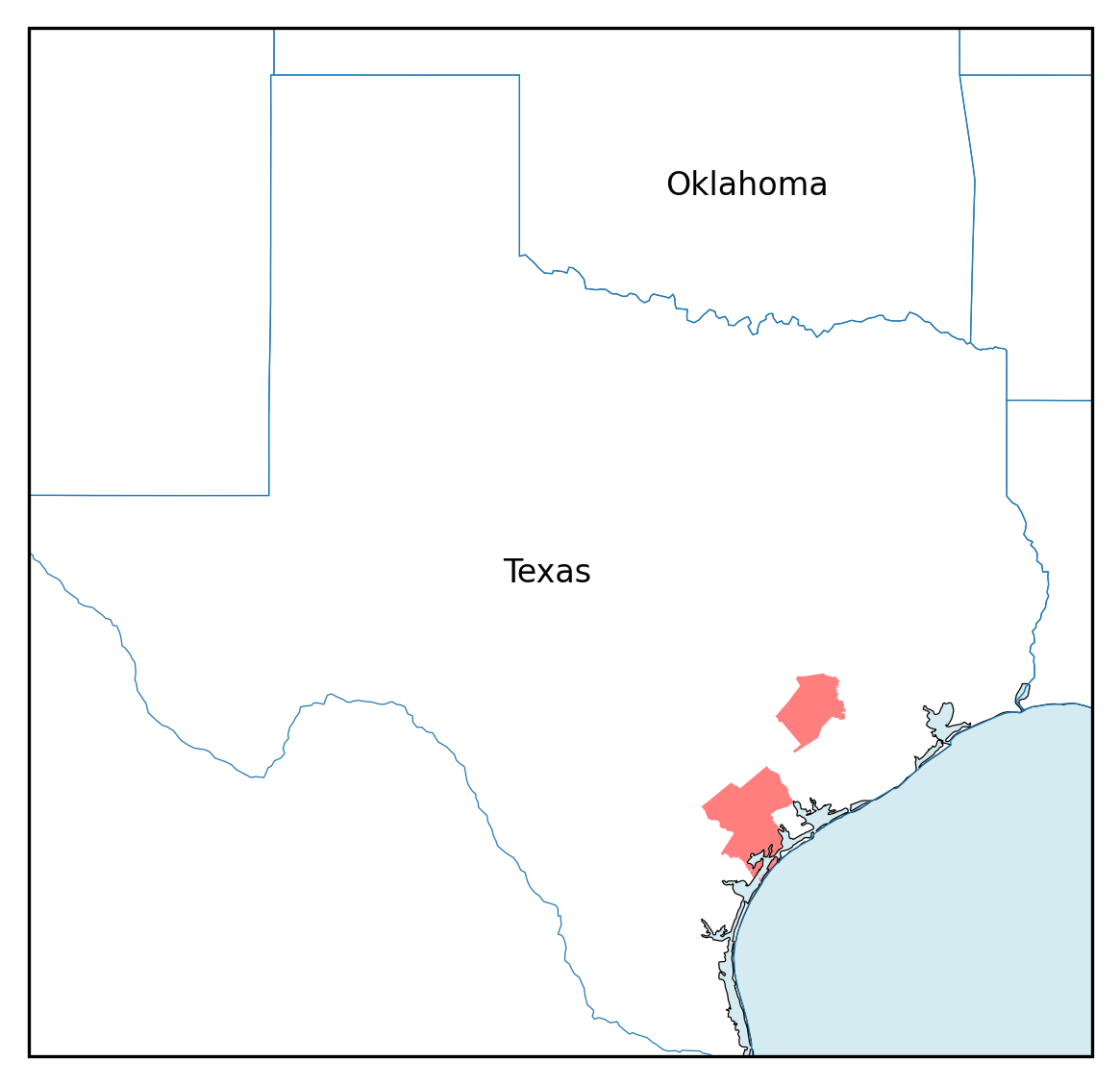

= Attwater's prairie-chicken =

Subspecies of bird

Attwater's prairie-chicken (Tympanuchus cupido attwateri) is a highly endangered subspecies of the greater prairie-chicken that is native to coastal Texas and formerly Louisiana in the United States.

== Description ==
Attwater's prairie-chicken measures 17–18 in (43–45.5 cm) and weighs roughly 1.5 to 2.0 lb (0.7 to 0.9 kg). It has a 28-in (70-cm) wingspan. These grouse have strong vertical bars of dark brown and buff-white pattern over the mantle, flanks, and underparts. The species exhibits sexual dimorphism, with the males having elongated feathers, called pinnae, erected to form what looks like ear-like structures. The male also has a bright orange or golden air sac on either side of his neck, which he inflates during mating displays. They have a lifespan of 2 to 5 years.

== Habitat and range ==
T. c. attwateri is endemic to the Western Gulf coastal grasslands. Its range historically stretched west from Bayou Teche in Louisiana to the Nueces River in Texas, possibly as far south as Tamaulipas, Mexico, and inland for 75 mi (121 km). This covered an area of 6 million acres (24,000 km^{2}). Today, populations exist in the wild at two locations: the Attwater Prairie Chicken National Wildlife Refuge near Eagle Lake, Texas, and on private lands in Goliad County.

== Reproduction ==
The mating display can be seen January through mid-May, peaking in mid-March, when the birds gather in small groups on short grass, bare ground, or hilly areas to choose a mate. This area is called a lek or "booming ground." In these areas, the females watch the males and choose their mate. The male emits a booming, "woo-woo" sound from his neck sac, causing it to inflate, and struts around to attract a female. Some of the traditional dances of the North American Plains Indians are based on this booming display.

In late spring, the hens lay 10 to 14 eggs in nests on the ground, hidden in tall grass. The eggs hatch about 26 days later. Only about 3 in 10 eggs hatch and the others are lost to predators. The chicks stay with the hen for about six weeks.

== Diet and predation ==
This species has a diverse diet, eating grass shoots, petals of flowers, seeds, and insects such as grasshoppers. Their predators include hawks, owls, coyotes, raccoons, skunks, opossums, and snakes. Chicks are susceptible to flooding.

== Conservation ==
In 1900, up to 1,000,000 Attwater's prairie-chickens inhabited the coastal grasslands. Loss of habitat is believed to be the prime reason for their decline. One of the major factors contributing to the habitat loss was the widespread planting, beginning in the early 1900s, of Chinese tallow trees (Triadica sebifera) to establish a soapmaking industry. Since that time, T. sebifera has proven to be an aggressive invader of the coastal grasslands, where it displaces the diverse native plant assemblage that was dominated by prairie grasses and forbs with dense, near-monospecific stands that significantly alter biotic and abiotic ecosystem processes. Coastal prairies have also declined with the invasion of non-native grasses such as Old World bluestems which create monocultures and change the structure of native grasslands. Urbanization has further contributed to habitat loss. As a result of these changes over the last 100 years, the grassland ecosystem where Attwater's prairie-chicken once thrived exists in small, scattered patches whose continued existence is threatened. Where once grazing plains bison and periodic wildfires due to lightning reduced brush, the birds now have difficulty making their way through thick undergrowth. Other, less-apparent changes in the ecosystem possibly have had an effect as well.

A 1937 study recorded about 8,700 Attwater's prairie-chickens remaining in four Texas counties. Attwater's prairie-chicken has been on the endangered species list since March 1967 when an estimated 1,070 birds were left in the wild. By 2003, fewer than 50 birds remained in the wild.

In 1995, Mobil Oil Corporation donated 2300 acres in Texas to the Nature Conservancy that was intended to provide habitat for the chicken. In 1999, the Nature Conservancy permitted new oil drilling on the property, intending to use the resulting funds to support prairie chicken conservation efforts. In the view of some organizations, including the Wildlife Society, the drilling harmed the prairie-chicken population at that location. The Nature Conservancy stated several years later that it had banned new drilling or mining on its lands, but was advised that it would not legally be able to overturn the 1999 agreement which allowed a new well to be drilled.

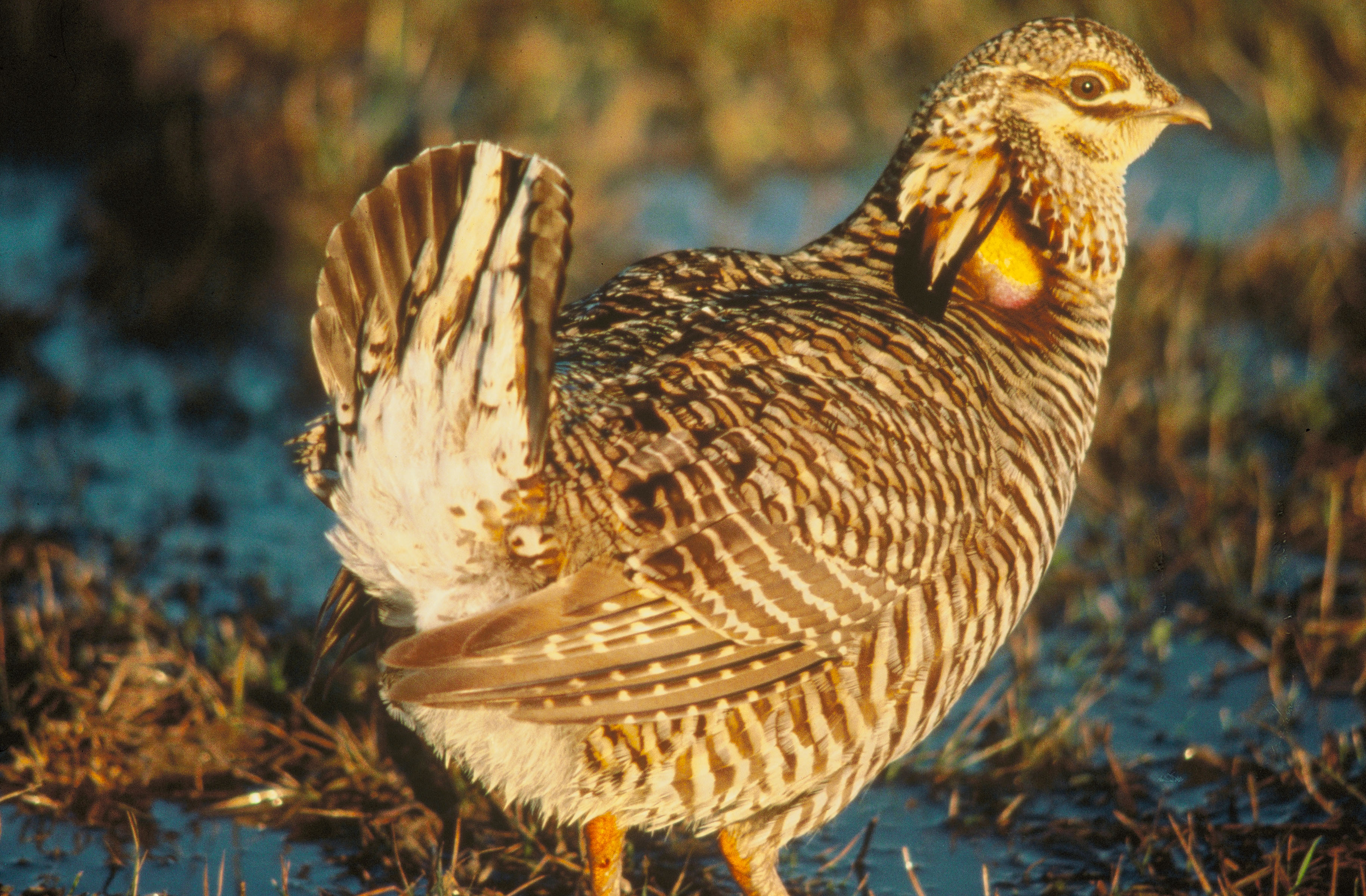
Male

In 2014, an estimated 260 birds remained, with about 100 living in the wild. Captive-breeding programs are underway at places such as Fossil Rim Wildlife Center, Abilene Zoo, and Caldwell Zoo (Tyler, TX). Through a partnership with the Houston Zoo, a captive-breeding flock is residing on the grounds of the NASA Lyndon B. Johnson Space Center near Clear Lake.

In 2016, the population declined to 42 birds following heavy spring floods, which wiped out an entire generation of eggs. Hurricane Harvey in 2017 was even more disastrous, likely killing at least 32 birds, with only five females found during the post-hurricane survey of the area. However, in the spring of 2018, the estimated wild population was 12. As of February 2019, with the Houston Zoo having released many individuals the previous year, the wild population was around 200. Since then, the wild population has decreased again. A count done later that year indicated only 108 birds remaining and a report from February 2021 stated fewer than 100.

== In popular culture ==
Though not referring to the subspecies by name, NBC sitcom The Monkees (1966-68) saw Dallas-born Michael Nesmith repeat the call to "save the Texas prairie chicken" in multiple second-season episodes, becoming a notable catchphrase for the character. In 2023 Attwater's prairie-chicken was featured on a United States Postal Service Forever stamp as part of the Endangered Species set, based on a photograph from Joel Sartore's Photo Ark. The stamp was dedicated at a ceremony at the National Grasslands Visitor Center in Wall, South Dakota.

== See also ==
- Heath hen
- Henry Philemon Attwater
