= Kent Durr =

South African politician

Member of the National Assembly
- In office 23 April 2004 – 31 July 2005
- Constituency: Western Cape

Personal details
- Born: 1941 (age 84–85) Cape Province, Union of South Africa
- Citizenship: South African citizenship
- Party: African Christian Democratic Party
- Other political affiliations: National Party (formerly)
- Education: University of Cape Town

Kent Diederich Skelton Durr (born 1941) is a South African politician and diplomat who served as Minister of Trade and Industry from September 1989 to March 1991 during the presidency of F. W. de Klerk. He later served as the last South African Ambassador to the United Kingdom from 1991 to 1994, then the first High Commissioner of the Republic of South Africa to the United Kingdom from 1994 to 1995, and he represented the African Christian Democratic Party (ACDP) in the National Assembly from April 2004 to July 2005.

== Life and career ==
Durr was born in the former Cape Province in 1941 and attended the South African College Schools and University of Cape Town. During apartheid, he represented the governing National Party in the House of Assembly, and in September 1989, he was one of two Anglophones appointed to President de Klerk's cabinet. He served as Minister of Trade and Industry until March 1991, when he was designated as South African Ambassador to the United Kingdom and left the assembly.

After the end of apartheid, Durr remained active in South African politics, ultimately leaving the NP for the ACDP. In the 2004 general election, he stood as a candidate for the ACDP and was elected to the post-apartheid National Assembly, serving the Western Cape constituency. He resigned on 31 July 2005 and was replaced by Hendry Cupido.
