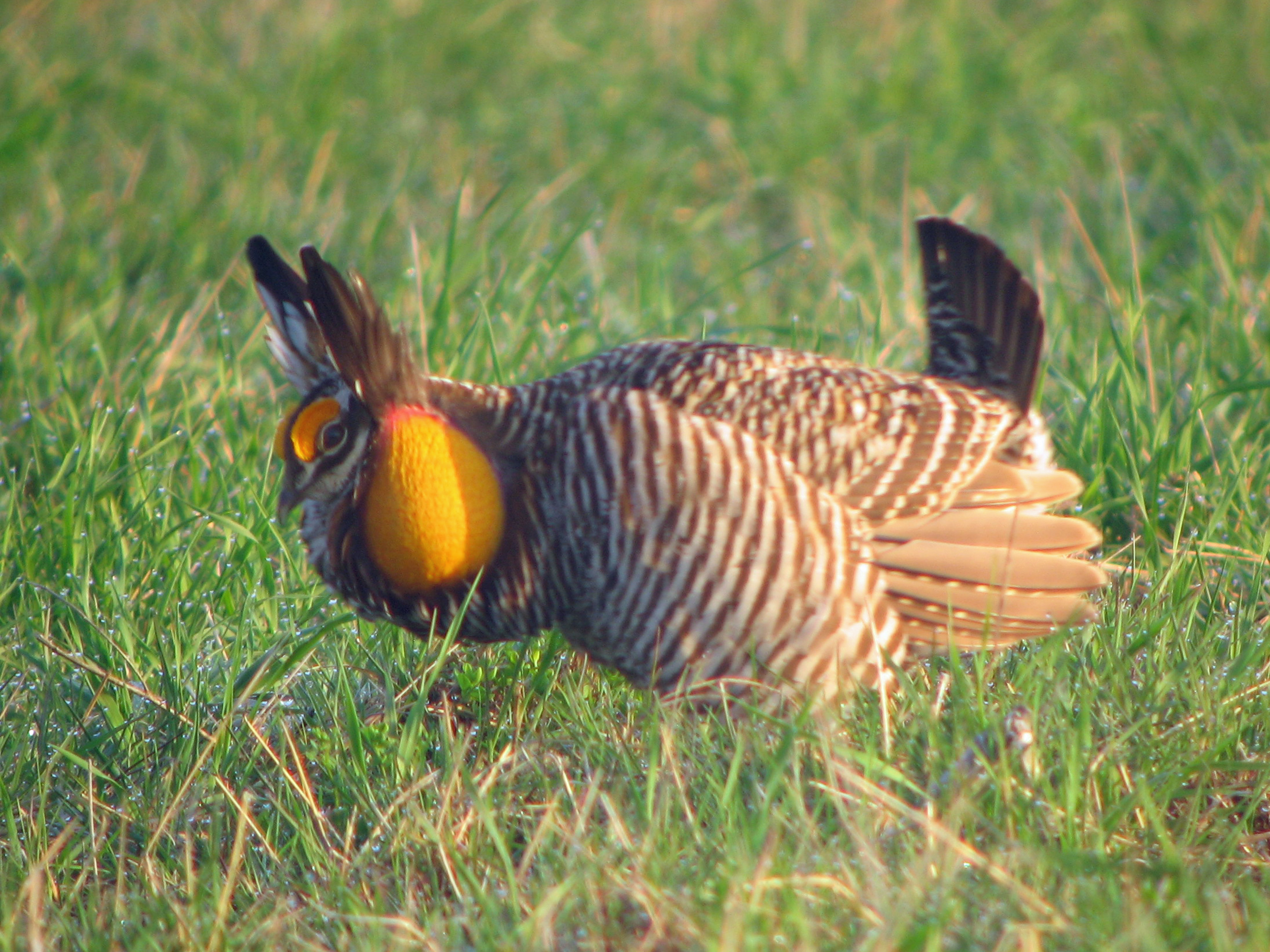
- Male displaying in Illinois, USA

Conservation status
- Near Threatened (IUCN 3.1)

Scientific classification
- Kingdom: Animalia
- Phylum: Chordata
- Class: Aves
- Order: Galliformes
- Family: Phasianidae
- Genus: Tympanuchus
- Species: T. cupido

Binomial name
- Tympanuchus cupido (Linnaeus, 1758)

Subspecies
- T. c. attwateri T. c. pinnatus T. c. cupido†
- Distribution map of the greater prairie-chicken. Pale and dark green: pre-settlement Dark green: current year-round

Synonyms
- Tetrao cupido Linnaeus, 1758

= Greater prairie-chicken =

Species of bird

The greater prairie-chicken or pinnated grouse (Tympanuchus cupido), sometimes called a boomer, is a large bird in the grouse tribe. This North American species was once abundant but has become extremely rare or extirpated over much of its range due to habitat loss, natural disasters, and overhunting. Conservation measures are underway to ensure the sustainability of existing small populations. One of the most famous aspects of these creatures is the mating ritual called booming.

Carl Linnaeus based his account on the "Le Cocq de bois d'Amerique" that had been described and illustrated by the English naturalist Mark Catesby in his book The Natural History of Carolina, Florida and the Bahama Islands. Catesby had seen greater prairie-chickens in 1743 at the home of the Earl of Wilmington in the then village of Chiswick, 7 mi (11 km) west of London. The Earl believed that that his birds had come from North America but did not know from where. Linnaeus specified the type locality as Virginia but this has been changed to Pennsylvania by the American Ornithologists' Union.

== Taxonomy ==
The greater prairie-chicken was formally described in 1758 by the Swedish naturalist Carl Linnaeus in the tenth edition of his Systema Naturae under the binomial name Tetrao cupido. Linnaeus based his account on the "Le Cocq de bois d'Amerique" that had been described and illustrated by the English naturalist Mark Catesby in his book The Natural History of Carolina, Florida and the Bahama Islands. Catesby had seen greater prairie-chickens in 1743 at the home of the Earl of Wilmington in the then village of Chiswick, 7 mi (11 km) west of London. The Earl believed that that his birds had come from North America but did not know from where. Linnaeus specified the type locality as Virginia but this has been changed to Pennsylvania by the American Ornithologists' Union. The specific epithet cupido was chosen as the erectile neck feathers were thought to resemble the wings of Cupid. The greater prairie-chicken is now placed together with the sharp-tailed grouse and the lesser prairie-chicken in the genus Tympanuchus that was introduced in 1841 by the German zoologist Constantin Gloger.

Three subspecies are recognised:

| Subspecies | Range | Image | Status |
|---|---|---|---|
| †Heath hen (Tympanuchus cupido cupido) (Note: Some taxonomists suggest that the heath hen may be its own separate species instead of a subspecies) | Formerly East Coast of the United States and Martha's Vineyard | | EX (1932) |
| Attwater's prairie-chicken (Tympanuchus cupido attwateri) | Coastal Texas and formerly Louisiana | | CR (Note: IUCN equivalent of Natureserve's G1 (Greatly imperilled) status.) |
| Greater prairie-chicken (Tympanuchus cupido pinnatus) | Central North America and Southern Canada | | NT |

== Description ==
Adults of both sexes are medium to large chicken-like birds, stocky with round wings. They have short tails which are typically rounded. Adult males have orange comb-like feathers over their eyes and dark, elongated head feathers that can be raised or lain along neck. They also possess a circular, un-feathered neck patch which can be inflated while displaying; this, like their comb feathers, is also orange. As with many other bird species, the adult females have shorter head feathers and also lack the male's yellow comb and orange neck patch. Adults are about 43 cm (17 in) long, and weigh between 700–1,200 g (25–42 oz). The greater prairie-chicken has a wingspan range of 69.5–72.5 cm (27.4–28.5 in).

== Distribution and habitat ==
The greater prairie-chicken prefers undisturbed prairie and was originally found in tallgrass prairies. It can tolerate agricultural land mixed with prairie, but sparser population density is found in areas that are more agricultural. Its diet consists primarily of seeds and fruit, but during the summer it also eats green plants and insects such as grasshoppers, crickets, and beetles. This species was once widespread all across the oak savanna and tall grass prairie ecosystem.

== Conservation ==
A steamboat captain recalled seeing great flocks of prairie chickens at Bird's Point in 1840, writing "Then we gazed in wonderment, but very soon our eyes were drawn to something more attractive which caused us to forget the great river. The whole banks or sandbars on either river were a mass of quail or partridges. I have never in my life seen such a grand sight. They had come from the prairies to the river, but unable to fly across either stream there they were by the millions running up and down each river until they had made paths and roads. We killed a great many with sticks and clubs and took them to the boat. We met Dick Bird, the man this point took its name from, and he said we could look for a cold winter, as the quails and prairie chickens were leaving the prairies and trying to get south to escape the cold."

The greater prairie-chicken was almost extinct in the 1930s due to hunting pressure and habitat loss. In Illinois alone, in the 1800s, the prairie-chicken numbered in the millions. It was a popular game bird, and like many prairie birds, which have also suffered massive habitat loss, it is now on the verge of extinction, with the wild bird population at around 200 in Illinois in 2019. It now only lives on small parcels of managed prairie land. Throughout North America, it is thought that their current population has declined severely, to approximately 360,000 individuals as of 2020. In May 2000, the Canadian Species at Risk Act listed the greater prairie-chicken as extirpated in its Canadian range (Alberta, Saskatchewan, Manitoba, Ontario). It was again confirmed by the Committee on the Status of Endangered Wildlife in Canada in November 2009. Nonetheless, sightings and encounters continue to occur in the south-central regions of Alberta and Saskatchewan, along with southern Ontario, where sightings are extremely rare.

In states such as Iowa and Missouri that once had thriving prairie-chicken populations (estimated to be hundreds of thousands), total numbers have dropped to about 500. However, the Missouri Department of Conservation has started a program to import prairie-chickens from Kansas and Nebraska in the hopes that they will be able to repopulate the state and increase that number to 3,000.

Wisconsin is home to a small population of greater prairie-chickens, down from 55,000 when first estimated in 1929 by A.O. Gross. Gross's contemporary, Aldo Leopold, felt that this population estimate was over-optimistic. In 1955, the hunting of prairie chickens was outlawed in Wisconsin. By 1998, a census of booming cocks (male birds) counted a total of 649 birds in their remaining habitat in central Wisconsin. As of 2025, up to 307 cocks were counted on booming grounds in central Wisconsin, the highest population recorded since 2007 – this population increase is largely driven by a growing population at the Buena Vista prairie management area. Though this area was predominately spruce and tamarack marsh before European settlement, early pioneers drained the marshes and attempted to farm the poor soil. As the prairies to the south and west were lost to agriculture and development, and the southern half of Wisconsin was logged, the prairies spread northward into the abandoned farmland. Today, over 30,000 acres are managed by the Wisconsin Department of Natural Resources as greater prairie-chicken habitat. Surveys conducted in 2025 detected that 38 different booming grounds were present in central Wisconsin wildlife areas. Birdwatchers travel from around the world to visit Wisconsin in April for the Central Wisconsin Prairie Chicken Festival, started in 2006 by Golden Sands Resource Conservation & Development Council, Inc.

=== Conservation of subspecies ===
The Attwater's prairie chicken is one of the most endangered endemic species of the United States, its biggest threats are habitat loss caused by industrialisation and natural disasters such as Hurricane Harvey. Captive-breeding programmes have been established at the Fossil Rim Wildlife Center, Abilene Zoo, Caldwell Zoo, Houston Zoo, and NASA.

There were many conservation efforts to save the heath hen. The biggest threats towards the subspecies were overhunting due to perceived overabundance, predation from invasive species such as feral cats, and natural disasters. As early as 1791, bills were passed to protect the species but were poorly enforced. By 1870, the heath hen was extirpated from mainland North America, leaving a relict population of 300 individuals on Martha's Vineyard. In 1908 the "Heath Hen Reserve" (Now the Manuel F. Correllus State Forest) was established as a last ditch effort to save the remaining birds. By late 1928, only one male individual remained, Booming Ben, the endling of the subspecies. Booming Ben was last seen in March 1932, with his disappearance marking the extinction of his subspecies.

There is an ongoing project to potentially revive the heath hen through genome editing and reintroduce it to Martha's Vineyard. The project is carried out by American non-profit, Revive & Restore.

== Threats ==
Habitat loss is the greatest historical threat to prairie-chicken populations. More than 95% of all tallgrass prairie in the United States has been converted to cropland. The conversion of native prairie to cropland is very detrimental to these birds. It was found in a radio telemetry study conducted by Kansas State University that "most prairie-chicken hens avoided nesting or rearing their broods within a quarter-mile of power lines and within a third-mile of improved roads." (Kansas Department of Wildlife and Parks) It was also found that the prairie-chickens avoided communication towers and rural farms.

Studies have found mesopredators such as striped skunks, raccoons, and opossums significantly increase egg mortality; experimental removal of these predators increased nesting success from 33% to 82%. Loss of apex predators such as bears, wolves, and mountain lions results in increased populations of these mesopredators, and therefore reduces populations of prairie-chickens, an example of a top-down trophic cascade. Non-native common pheasants also reduce prairie-chicken reproduction through nest parasitism.

The small size of some isolated prairie-chicken populations in the Eastern portion of the range resulted in a population bottleneck, which reduced the genetic diversity and ultimately survival of offspring. In Illinois, wildlife management included the "genetic rescue" of small and potentially inbred populations by introducing birds from other areas.

== Sexual behavior ==
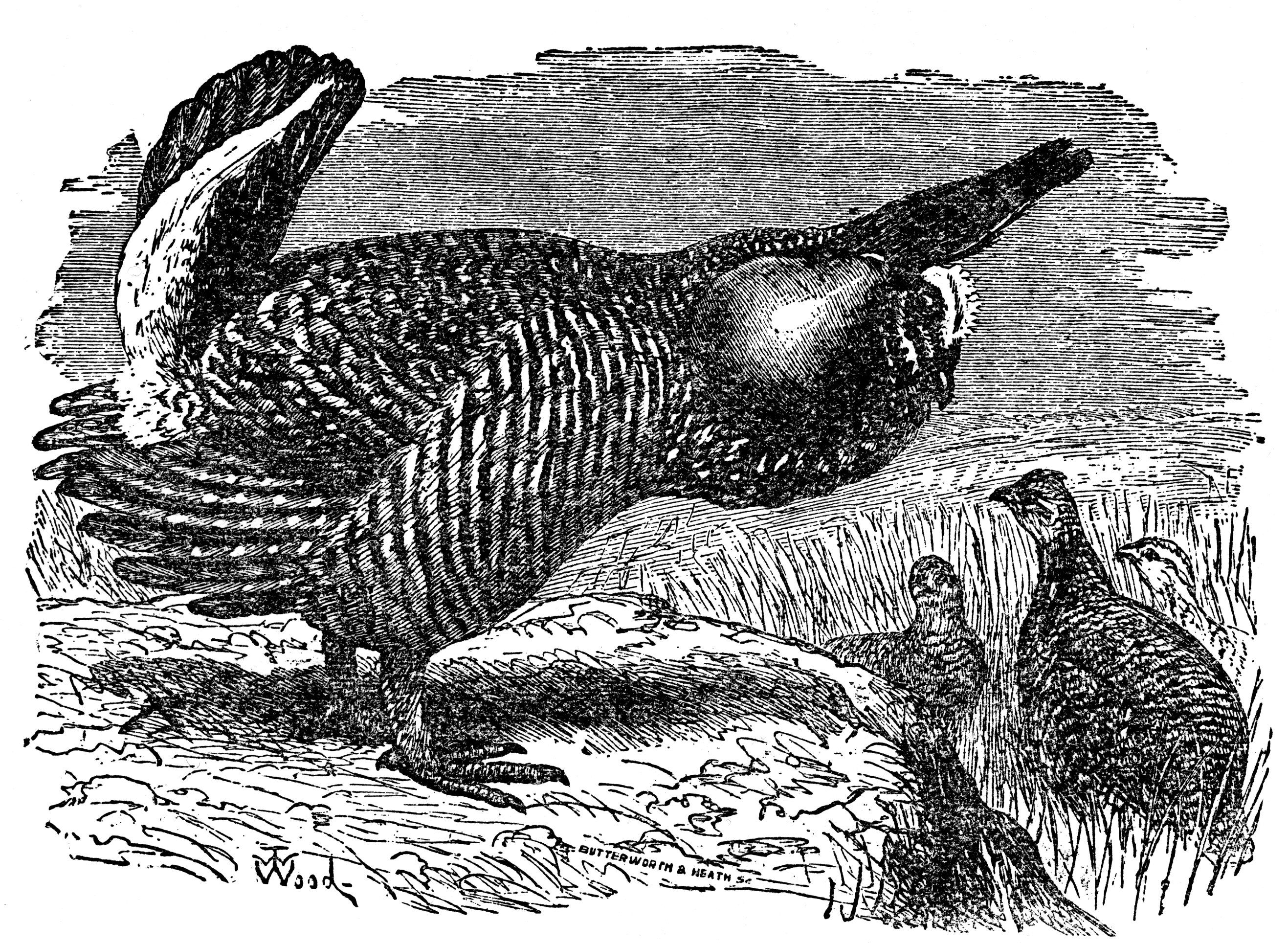
Tetrao cupido drawn by T. W. Wood for second edition of Darwin's The Descent of Man, 1874

Greater prairie-chickens do not migrate. They are territorial birds and often defend their booming grounds. These booming grounds are the area in which they perform their displays in hopes of attracting females. Their displays consist of inflating air sacs located on the side of their neck and snapping their tails. These booming grounds usually have very short or no vegetation. The male prairie-chickens stay on this ground displaying for almost two months. The breeding season usually begins in the United States starting in late March and throughout April. During this time the males establish booming sites where they display for the females. The one or two most dominant males can obtain 90% of mating opportunities. Due to their now small populations and habitat fragmentation the greater prairie-chickens often undergo inbreeding causing observable inbreeding depression: with fewer offspring and a decreased survival rate within these limited offspring further aiding their population decrease.

After mating has taken place, the females move about one mile from the booming grounds and begin to build their nests. Hens lay between 5 and 17 eggs per clutch and the eggs take between 23 and 24 days to hatch. Eggs measure 4.1–4.4 cm (1.6–1.7 in) in length and 3.1–3.2 cm (1.2–1.3 in) in width. There are between five and 10 young per brood. The young are raised by the female and fledge in one to four weeks, are completely independent by the tenth to twelfth week, and reach sexual maturity by age one (Ammann, 1957). A study of female greater prairie-chickens in Kansas found that their survival rates were 1.6 to 2.0 times higher during the non-breeding season compared to the breeding season; this was due to heavy predation during nesting and brood-rearing. One problem facing prairie-chickens is competition with the ring-necked pheasants. Pheasants lay their eggs in prairie-chicken nests. The pheasant eggs hatch first; this causes the prairie-chickens to leave the nest thinking that the young have hatched. In reality, prairie-chicken eggs do not hatch and the young usually die due to lack of incubation.

Displays at a lek in Illinois, USA

== See also ==
- Lesser prairie-chicken
- Lekking
