= Pauline Cupido =

South African politician

Member of the Western Cape Provincial Parliament
- In office 2003–2012

Member of the National Assembly
- In office 1994–2003

Personal details
- Citizenship: South Africa
- Party: Democratic Alliance
- Other party: African Christian Democratic Party; Democratic Party; New National Party; National Party
- Spouse: Hendry Cupido

Paulina Wilhelmina "Pauline" Cupido is a South African politician who served in the Western Cape Provincial Parliament from 2003 to 2012, representing the African Christian Democratic Party (ACDP) from 2004 onwards. She was also the ACDP's provincial leader in the Western Cape until 2012, when she left to join the Democratic Alliance (DA).

Before joining the provincial legislature, Cupido served in the National Assembly from 1994 to 2003. While there, she represented the National Party (NP, later the New National Party) until the 1999 general election, when she defected to the Democratic Party (DP, later the DA). She is Coloured.

== National Assembly: 1994–2003 ==
In the 1994 general election, Cupido was elected to represent the NP (later the New National Party) in the National Assembly. She was viewed as a member of the moderate wing of the NP, most prominently led by Roelf Meyer. Ahead of the next general election in 1999, she was ranked highly on the party list of the New National Party (NNP), the NP's successor: she was ranked fifth in the Western Cape and was the only woman to feature among the party's top 12 candidates. However, according to Cupido, she was dismayed when the party list was published in December 1998. She said in 1999:

The NNP is a male chauvinist party! The final straw came in December. We asked them to consider that at least one in five places be reserved for women. They booed me! Whenever female members stood up, they were clearly not interested. They [male MPs] started talking on their own.

In particular, the Mail & Guardian said that Cupido had clashed with the NNP's Gerald Morkel, then the Premier of the Western Cape. She left the NNP in early 1999 and joined the DP, on whose ticket she was re-elected to the National Assembly; she represented the Western Cape constituency. She remained with the DP when it became the DA during the legislative term, and in early 2003, she resigned her seat in the National Assembly in order to fill a casual vacancy in the DA's caucus in the Western Cape Provincial Parliament.

== Provincial Parliament: 2003–2012 ==
While in the provincial parliament, Cupido was considered a frontrunner to succeed Morkel as provincial leader of the DA in the Western Cape. She was not elected to the party office, and ahead of the 2004 general election she joined the ACDP. In the election, she was elected to a full term as one of the ACDP's two representatives in the Western Cape Provincial Parliament. She was re-elected in 2009, on that occasion as the ACDP's sole provincial representative.

During her time as ACDP, Cupido stood as the ACDP's candidate for Mayor of Cape Town in the 2006 local elections. Controversially, upon the launch of her candidacy, she promised to "make Cape Town an efficiently run, world-class, God-friendly city, instead of a poorly run, gay-friendly city". She said that this promise led to a "vicious personal attack on her by certain members of the homosexual lobby" and defended her remarks, saying that most South Africans "come from backgrounds that frown upon homosexual conduct" and that the "humanistic values" of the Constitution could not be imposed on the personal beliefs of Christians.

She was not elected to Cape Town's mayoral office, but in the aftermath of the election she reportedly played a key role in solidifying an opposition coalition that elected the DA's Helen Zille as mayor. In 2009, however, the DA alleged that Cupido personally had damaged the relationship between the DA and the ACDP by opposing the DA's suggestion that she should support, in the provincial parliament, Zille's candidacy as Premier of the Western Cape. Cupido stood as the ACDP's candidate for Mayor of Mossel Bay in the next local elections in 2011, and she also served as provincial leader of the ACDP in the Western Cape.

She left her seat in the provincial parliament in March 2012 and in November that year she left the ACDP and rejoined the DA.

== Personal life ==
Cupido is married to politician Hendry Cupido, who accompanied her from the NP to the DP and from the ACDP to the DA.
