= John Cupido =

South African politician

John Cristiano Cupido Member of Parliament
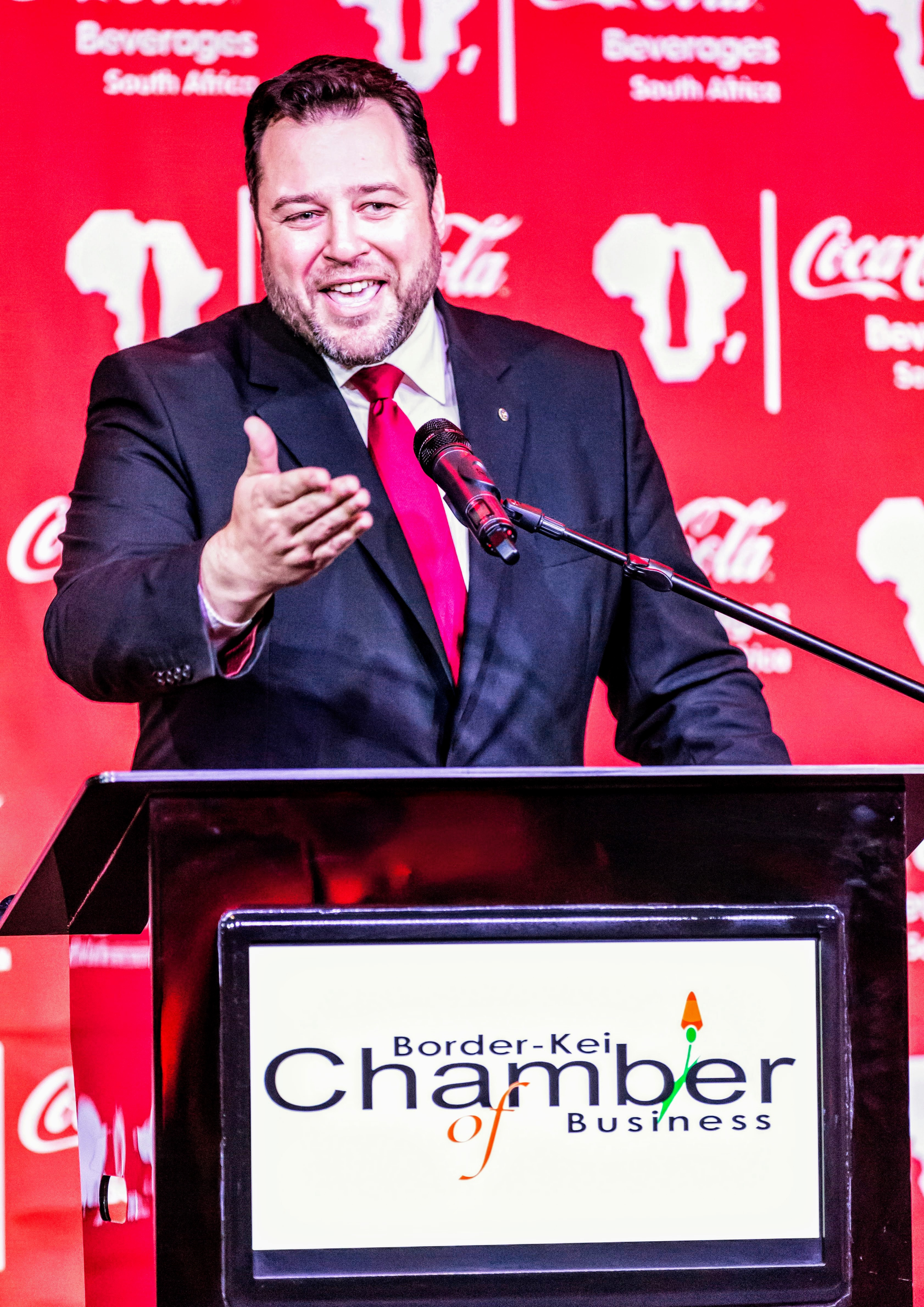

Member of EC Provincial Parliament
- Incumbent
- Assumed office 2009
- Leader: Musi Maimane

Member of Parliament for Chris Hani District, Eastern Cape
- Incumbent
- Assumed office 6 May 2009

Personal details
- Born: 20 June 1976 (age 49) Lichtenburg, North-West Province, South Africa
- Party: Democratic Alliance
- Education: Selborne College
- Alma mater: Rhodes University
- Website: www.johncupido.com

John Cupido (born 20 June 1976) is a South African politician, a Member of Parliament in the Eastern Cape Provincial Parliament for the Democratic Alliance (DA) where he is the Shadow MEC of Health and also the DA's spokesperson on Economic Development, Environmental Affairs & Tourism; and acting spokesperson on Sports, Recreation, Arts & Culture. He was first elected as a City Councillor in 2006 in East London where he led the Buffalo City DA Caucus till his election to the Provincial Legislature in the 2009 General Election in April 2009 at the age of 32.

== Background ==
John Cupido was born in the town of Lichtenburg in the North West Province in South Africa. In 1986 his family moved to East London, where he attended Stirling Primary School and in 1990 went to Selborne College where he excelled in field athletics, being awarded school colours and being selected as the Athletics Captain in his senior year. John also excelled with leadership roles culminating in him being elected House Captain (Fuller House) in his senior year and leading his house to winning the House Cup. John matriculated from Selborne College in 1994.

== Current Professional and Charity Work Positions Held ==
- President of Border-Kei Chamber of Business (BKCOB)
- Chairman of the Public/Private Sector Forum (BKCOB)
- Chairman of Round Table East London No.1
- Committee member at Gately Rotary Club

== Career in politics ==
John Cupido was elected as the DA Eastern Cape Provincial Youth leader in 2004 was successfully maintained this position till the age of 32 when the Democratic Alliance lowered the maximum age of DA Youth members from 35 to 30. During his time with the DA Youth, he oversaw the establishment and growth of the youth movement in the Eastern Cape and was one of the founding members of the federal DA Youth and DASO structures in place in 2014.

John was elected as a City Councillor in 2006 in East London; his ward covered Beacon Bay, Nompumelelo, Abbotsford and Dorchester Heights.

In 2008, John was elected to lead the Buffalo City DA Caucus, and was later elected to the Provincial Legislature in the 2009 General Election in April 2009.

In 2012, Cupido was the Democratic Alliance party spokesman on health issues.

== Political Positions Held ==
- Elected as DA MPL (Member of Provincial Legislature) [2009-Current]
- DA Spokesperson on: Health; Economic Development, Environmental Affairs and Tourism; Sport, Recreation, Arts and Culture; Youth, Gender and Disability.
- Member of DA Federal Council [2009-2014]
- Elected as DA Ward Councillor [2006]
- Elected DA Caucus Leader Buffalo City Municipality [2008/09]
- Election Campaign Manager - Amatole Constituency [2008/09]
- Member of DA Provincial Executive (PEC) [2005-2010]
- Vice-chair of ADAC in EC [2006-2009]
- ADAC Trainer [2007-2009]
- Exco member of DA Federal Youth Council (DAY) [2005-2009]
- Eastern Cape DA Youth Leader [2005-2008]
- Exco member of Amatole Constituency [2003-2009]
- Beacon Bay DA Branch Chair [2003-2005]
