= Michela Cupido =

Italian footballer (born 1978)

Personal information
- Date of birth: 2 May 1978 (age 48)
- Height: 1.74 m (5 ft 9 in)
- Position: Goalkeeper

Senior career*
| Years | Team | Apps | (Gls) |
- ACF Milan

International career
| 2005 | Italy | 1 | (0) |
- * Club domestic league appearances and goals

Michela Cupido (born 2 May 1978) is an Italian former footballer who played as a goalkeeper for ACF Milan.

== International career ==
Michela Cupido was also part of the Italian team at the 2005 European Championships. Cupido made her debut for Italy in 2009 for the Azzuri.
