= Moses Lake (Texas) =

Lake in Texas, United States

- Location within Texas Location within the United States
- Location: Galveston Bay, Texas
- Coordinates: 29°25′44.0796″N 94°55′40.8389″W
- Primary inflows: Moses Bayou
- Primary outflows: Galveston Bay
- Basin countries: United States

Moses Lake is a lake located near Texas City, Texas, US, in the Houston-Sugar Land-Baytown metropolitan area. It is fed by Moses Bayou and drains into Galveston Bay.
