= Hendry Cupido =

South African politician

Member of the National Assembly
- In office 1 August 2005 – May 2009
- Constituency: Western Cape

Personal details
- Citizenship: South Africa
- Party: Democratic Alliance (since 2012); African Christian Democratic Party (until 2012)
- Spouse: Pauline Cupido

Hendry Benjamin Cupido is a South African politician who represented the African Christian Democratic Party (ACDP) in the National Assembly from 2005 to 2009, serving the Western Cape constituency. He was sworn in on 1 August 2005, filling a casual vacancy created by the resignation of Kent Durr.

He is the husband of Pauline Cupido, who also served in the National Assembly. In November 2012, the couple defected together from the ACDP to the Democratic Alliance.
