= Fossil Rim Wildlife Center =

Non-profit conservation center in Texas

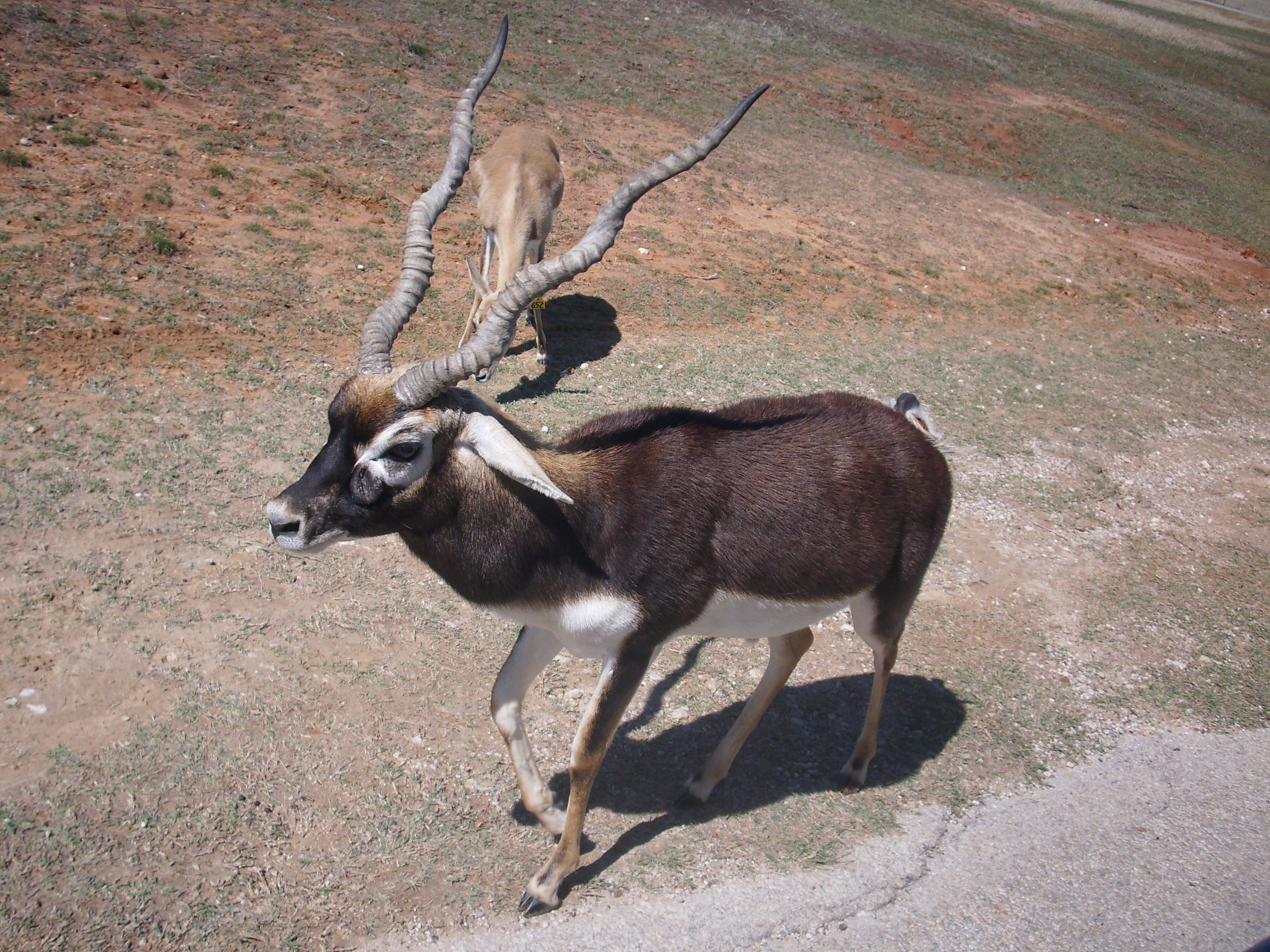
- A blackbuck at the Fossil Rim Wildlife Center
- Interactive map of Fossil Rim Wildlife Center
- 32.180556°N 97.796389°W
- Date opened: 1984
- Location: Glen Rose, Texas
- Land area: 1,800 acres (7.3 km^{2})
- No. of animals: 1000+
- No. of species: 50
- Memberships: AZA, WAZA IRF C2S2 ZAA EWA
- Website: fossilrim.org

Fossil Rim Wildlife Center is a 501(c)(3) non-profit conservation center near Glen Rose, Texas. They specialize in the breeding of endangered species, public education, scientific research and natural land management. The facility has over 1,000 animals from 50 species. Guests have access to guided and self-guided tours across the center's 1800 acres of Texas Hill Country, as well as lodging, dining and educational facilities.

== History ==
The center was first an exotic herding ranch acquired by a Texan businessman from the oil industry named Tom Mantzel. He bought the ranch in 1973 and renamed it Fossil Rim Wildlife Ranch. The project was at first a weekend retreat for Mantzel, but it soon became a full-time occupation. Concerned by the extinction of species, Mantzel started experimenting with breeding endangered species in 1982 with Grévy's zebras. Fossil Rim was the first ranch to participate in the Species Survival Plan, an initiative partnered with the Association of Zoos and Aquariums (AZA), and their success with zebras prompted the association to continue its work with Fossil Rim.

Mantzel decided to open the zoo to the public in 1984; with the oil crash, he was in dire need of funding to continue his breeding program. With a small team, he built a road along the 1,400 acres of land and opened a snack bar and a souvenir shop. He also brought a few more animals to bring in the public: Grant's zebras, ostriches, and reticulated giraffes.

A volunteer program was developed to help with the visits, and the park started his education mission. In 1985, more endangered species were brought to the ranch, including the scimitar-horned oryx. At that time the park got permission from the U.S. government to import cheetahs for a breeding program, which became one of the most successful projects of the center. But even with the success, the maintenance costs were still too high, and in 1987 Mantzel started looking for partners.

Jim Jackson and Krystyna Jurzykowski were looking for a venture to engage themselves in conservation, planning to open a marine park in Martinique. Learning that they were seeking information from the Fossil Rim Ranch, Mantzel approached the couple to ask them if they would be interested in partnering with him to save the park, giving operational funds for the park. But seeing foreclosure as imminent, they decided to buy the ranch, which became the Fossil Rim Wildlife Center on May 7, 1987.

== Areas ==
Fossil Rim's property covers 1800 acres of hill-country topography including rolling hills, limestone deposits, and wooded and open land. In addition to providing habitat for the facility's animals, this land is also used for hay production and the protection of native Texas flora and fauna. The property is divided into several pastures, some of which guests have the opportunity to travel through on tours. The areas include:

- Front pasture – The first pasture guests enter during a tour. Houses various hoof stock such as the blackbuck and wildebeest.
- Buffer pasture – This area acts not only as pasture for crepuscular species like the bongo and the greater kudu, but as hay producing land and separates the Front and Main pastures from each other.
- Main pasture – So called for its status as the largest pasture guests can travel through on tour, the main pasture houses many of Fossil Rim's antelope species.
- Preserve pasture – This pasture is home to some of the most recognizable animals on Fossil Rim property including giraffes.
- Intensive management area – This area, also known as the IMA, is off-limits to guests unless on a guided tour. This area houses species that are typically vulnerable and endangered, and have historically had better conservation breeding success with less human interaction. For this reason, these species are kept out of the public eye more than other animals on property, so that staff can better assess their needs. This area is well known for containing one of two cheetah facilities on site. The other location, known as Cheetah Hill, is open to guests on a standard drive-though tour.
- The overlook – One of two locations on property where guests can exit their cars, the Overlook is home to the Overlook Café, restrooms, the conservation-focused Nature Store, Conservation Investigation (Educational Center), and Animal Discoveries.

Other land owned by Fossil Rim is used for hay production, educational facilities, conservation and administrative buildings.

== Animal species ==
Fossil Rim Wildlife Center houses over 1000 animals in 50 species, of which 22 are vulnerable or endangered, including:

- Addax
- African spurred tortoise
- Aoudad
- Arabian oryx
- Attwater's prairie chicken
- Axis deer
- Black-footed cat
- Black-tailed jackrabbit
- Blackbuck
- Blue and gold macaw
- Cheetah
- Waterbuck
- Wildebeest
- Dama gazelle
- Emu
- Fallow deer
- Gemsbok
- Giraffe
- Greater kudu
- Grevy's zebra
- Hartmann's mountain zebra
- Mexican gray wolf
- Mountain bongo
- Nigerian dwarf goat
- Nile lechwe
- Nine-banded armadillo
- Przewalski's horse
- Red-crowned crane
- Red deer
- Red wolf
- Roadrunner
- Roan antelope
- Sable antelope
- Sandhill crane
- Scimitar-horned oryx
- South-central black rhinoceros
- Southern white rhinoceros
- Texas tortoise
- Vietnamese pot-bellied pig
- White-tailed deer
- Wild turkey

== Conservation ==
The first mission of the Fossil Rim Wildlife Center is the conservation of species through scientific research, responsible management of natural resources, professional training and public education.

=== Conservation Centers for Species Survival ===
The Fossil Rim Wildlife Center is one of the five founding organizations of the Conservation Centers for Species Survival (C2S2), a consortium created to develop programs for the sustainability of endangered species. The center brings the expertise of many large-scale zoological and environmental institutions to address issues related to the conservation of endangered species through study, management and recovery plans. The central office of the consortium is in the Fossil Rim Wildlife Center.

=== Scimitar-horned oryx ===
Fossil Rim Wildlife Center participates in the reproduction and rehabilitation program of the scimitar-horned Oryx in Chad and the rest of sub-saharan Africa. The species was extinct in the wild from the 1980s until late 2023, when it was upgraded to endangered. Poaching, loss of habitat and political strife were some of the causes of its decline, but a worldwide breeding program has helped restore some of the species. A first herd of 25 beasts were released in Chad in April 2016 with collars giving their position via satellite to follow them in their habitat. Fossil Rim helped in the evaluation of the collar by testing it on their own herd inside the park to make sure the animals would not be incapacitated by them.

=== Attwater's prairie chicken ===
The center participates in a program to rehabilitate the Attwater's prairie chicken, a small grouse native of the coastal plains of Louisiana and Texas, now one of the most endangered bird species in America. Fossil Rim Wildlife Center and five other zoos initiated a breeding program for the species in 1992. Around 180 birds are released in the wild every year from the center. Even if the species has not grown in the wild, the project prevented complete extinction.

=== Cheetah ===
The center has one of the most successful cheetah breeding programs in the world, with more than 300 feline bred and raised there. Fossil Rim has two cheetah areas that can house a combined 25-plus cats in a suitable environment. The cheetah breeding program emphasizes genetic diversity and multiple mate choices so that the healthiest cubs possible can be born.

== Affiliations and awards ==
Fossil Rim is an accredited member of the Zoological Association of America (ZAA), the Association of Zoos and Aquariums (AZA), and a member and the home base of the Conservation Centers for Species Survival (C2S2). They work with the International Rhino Foundation (IRF), Sahara Conservation (SCF), the Saola Working Group (SWG) of the International Union for Conservation of Nature (IUCN), the Giraffe Conservation Foundation (GCF), the Exotic Wildlife Association (EWA), the Second Ark Foundation, the USDA, the U.S. Fish and Wildlife Service, Tarleton State University, and the Glen Rose Independent School District.

== Gallery ==
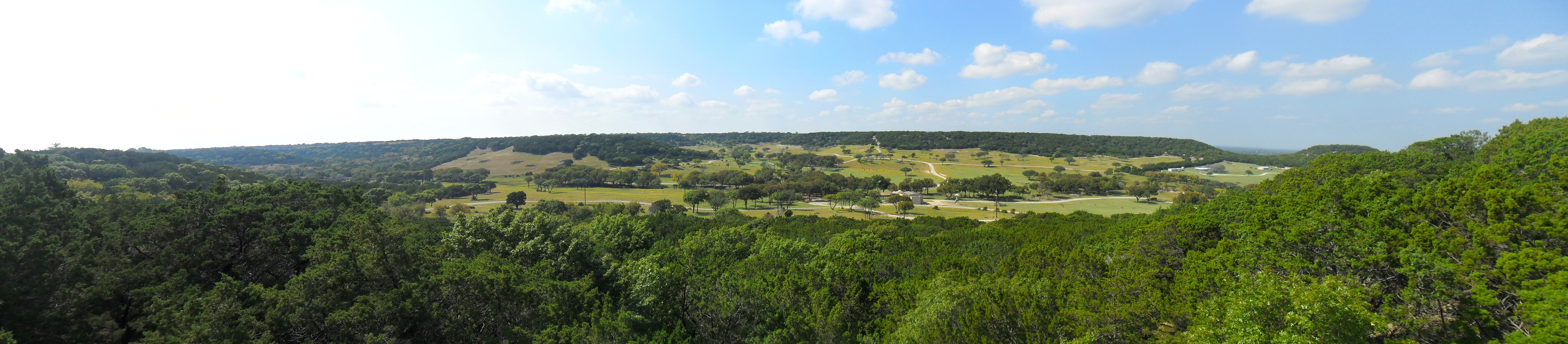
Panorama of Fossil Rim Wildlife Center, taken from The Overlook Cafe balcony
