= Cupid (disambiguation) =

Cupid is the god of love in Roman mythology.

Cupid(s) may also refer to:

== Geography ==
- Cupids, Newfoundland and Labrador, Canada, a town

== People ==
- Cupid (singer) (born 1982), stage name of Bryson Bernard
- Jonah Kūhiō Kalanianaʻole (1871–1922), a Hawaiian politician and aristocrat nicknamed "Prince Cupid"

== Arts, entertainment, and media ==
=== Fictional characters ===
- Cupid (DC Comics), a fictional comic book character
- Cupid, one of Santa Claus's reindeer

=== Music ===
==== Albums ====
- Cupid (Cupid album), the self-titled debut album by Cupid
- Cupid?, a 2004 album by Canadian rock band Stabilo

==== Songs ====
- "Cupid" (112 song), a song by American R&B quartet 112
- "Cupid" (Sam Cooke song), covered by many artists
- "Cupid" (Fifty Fifty song), 2023
- "Cupid" (Lloyd song), a 2011 song by American R&B singer Lloyd
- "Cupid" (Daniel Powter song), a 2012 Daniel Powter song
- "Cupid", a 2025 song by Amane Kanata from Trigger
- "Cupid", a song by EarthGang and 6lack from Spilligion
- "Cupid", a song by Jack Johnson from On and On
- "Cupid", a 2015 song by Kara from In Love
- "Cupid", a 2015 song by Oh My Girl from Oh My Girl
- "Cupid", a 1998 song by Sara Evans from No Place That Far

=== Television ===
- Cupid (1998 TV series), starring Paula Marshall and Jeremy Piven
- Cupid, a 2003 dating reality show produced by Simon Cowell and FremantleMedia
- Cupid (2009 TV series), a remake of the 1998 TV series, starring Sarah Paulson and Bobby Cannavale
- "The Cupid", a 2016 episode of Plebs

=== Other uses in arts, entertainment, and media ===
- Cupid (Michelangelo), one of two sculptures
- Cupid, a 2012 TV film starring Joely Fisher

== Other uses ==
- CUORE Upgrade with Particle Identification (CUPID), a physics experiment
- Cupid plc, a British company that owns and operates dating websites
- Cupid (horse)
- Cupid (moon), a moon orbiting the planet Uranus

== See also ==
- "Qpid", a 1991 episode of Star Trek: The Next Generation
- Cupid Day, a fictional day (on a Friday, February 12, repeating again and again) at Lauren Oliver's 2010 novel Before I Fall
