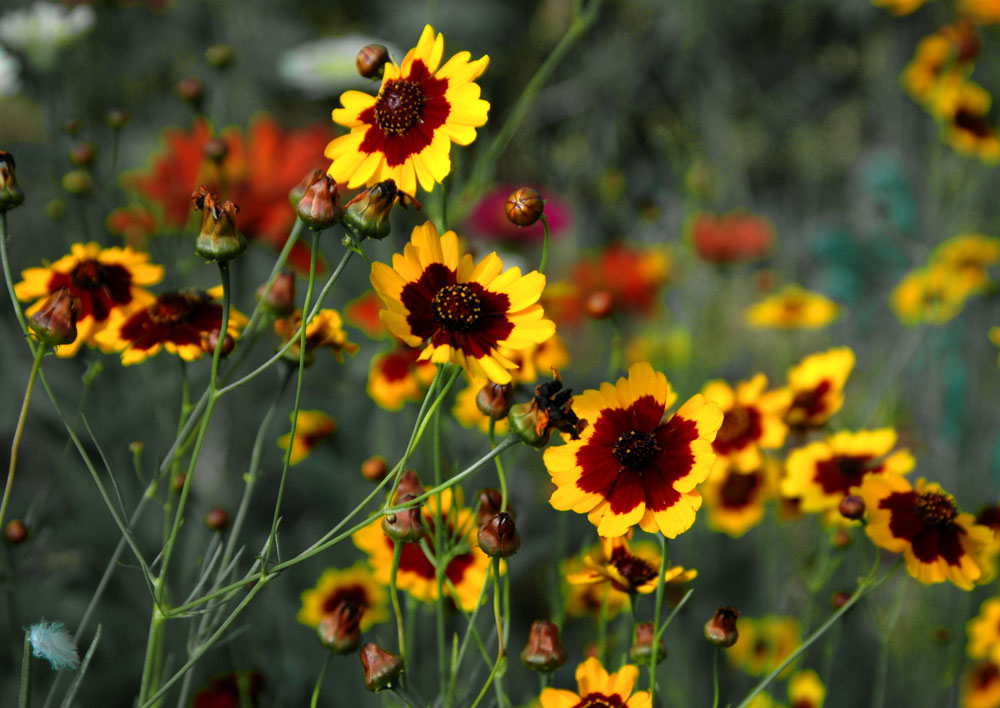

Conservation status
- Secure (NatureServe)

Scientific classification
- Kingdom: Plantae
- Clade: Embryophytes
- Clade: Tracheophytes
- Clade: Spermatophytes
- Clade: Angiosperms
- Clade: Eudicots
- Clade: Asterids
- Order: Asterales
- Family: Asteraceae
- Genus: Coreopsis
- Species: C. tinctoria

Binomial name
- Coreopsis tinctoria Nutt.

Synonyms
- Synonymy: Bidens tinctoria (Nutt.) E.H.L.Krause; Calliopsis tinctoria (Nutt.) DC.; Diplosastera tinctoria (Nutt.) Tausch; Bidens atkinsoniana (Douglas ex Lindl.) Banfi, Galasso & Bartolucci; Calliopsis atkinsoniana (Douglas ex Lindl.) Hook.; Calliopsis atropurpurea Steud.; Calliopsis bicolor Rchb.; Calliopsis bicolor var. nana T.Moore; Calliopsis bicolor f. speciosa T.Moore; Calliopsis bicolor f. tubulosa T.Moore; Calliopsis cardaminifolia DC.; Coreopsis atkinsoniana Douglas ex Lindl.; Coreopsis bicolor (Rchb.) Bosse; Coreopsis cardaminifolia (DC.) Nutt.; Coreopsis cardaminifolia var. angustiloba Torr. & A.Gray; Coreopsis elegans Voss; Coreopsis similis F.E.Boynton; Coreopsis stenophylla F.E.Boynton; Coreopsis tinctoria var. atkinsoniana Douglas ex Lindl.) H.M.Parker ex E.B.Sm.; Coreopsis tinctoria var. atropurpurea Hook.; Coreopsis tinctoria f. atropurpurea (Hook.) Fernald; Coreopsis tinctoria var. imminuata Sherff; Coreopsis tinctoria var. similis (F.E.Boynton) H.M.Parker ex E.B.Sm.

= Plains coreopsis =

Species of flowering plant

Coreopsis tinctoria, commonly known as plains coreopsis, garden tickseed, golden tickseed, or calliopsis, is an annual forb in the Asteraceae family. The species is common in Canada (from Quebec to British Columbia), northeast Mexico (Coahuila, Nuevo León, Tamaulipas), and most of the United States, especially the Great Plains and Southern States. It has been introduced and naturalized into many parts of Europe and Asia.

It often grows in disturbed areas such as roadsides and cultivated fields.

== Description ==
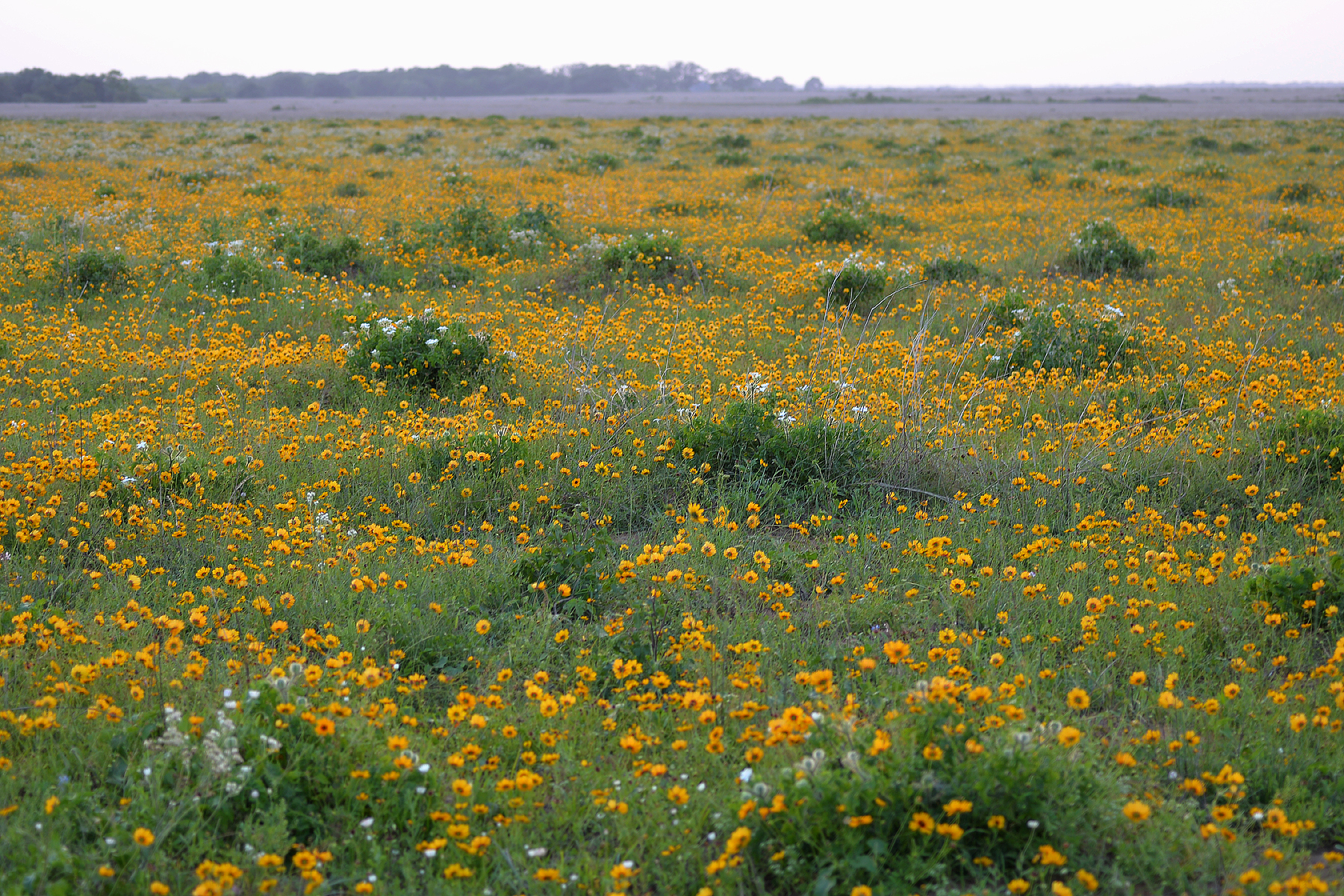
Plains coreopsis (Coreopsis tinctoria) and Texas bullnettle (Cnidoscolus texanus) blooming at Attwater Prairie Chicken National Wildlife Refuge, Colorado Co., Texas, USA

Growing quickly, Coreopsis tinctoria attains heights of 30–100 cm (12–40 in). Its leaves are pinnately-divided, glabrous and tend to thin at the top of the plant where numerous 25–40 mm (1–1 1/2 in) flower heads sit atop slender stems.

Flower heads are brilliant yellow with maroon or brown disc florets of various sizes. Flowering typically occurs in mid-summer. The small, slender seeds germinate in fall (overwintering as a low rosette) or early spring. Ray florets have notched tips.

== Distribution and habitat ==
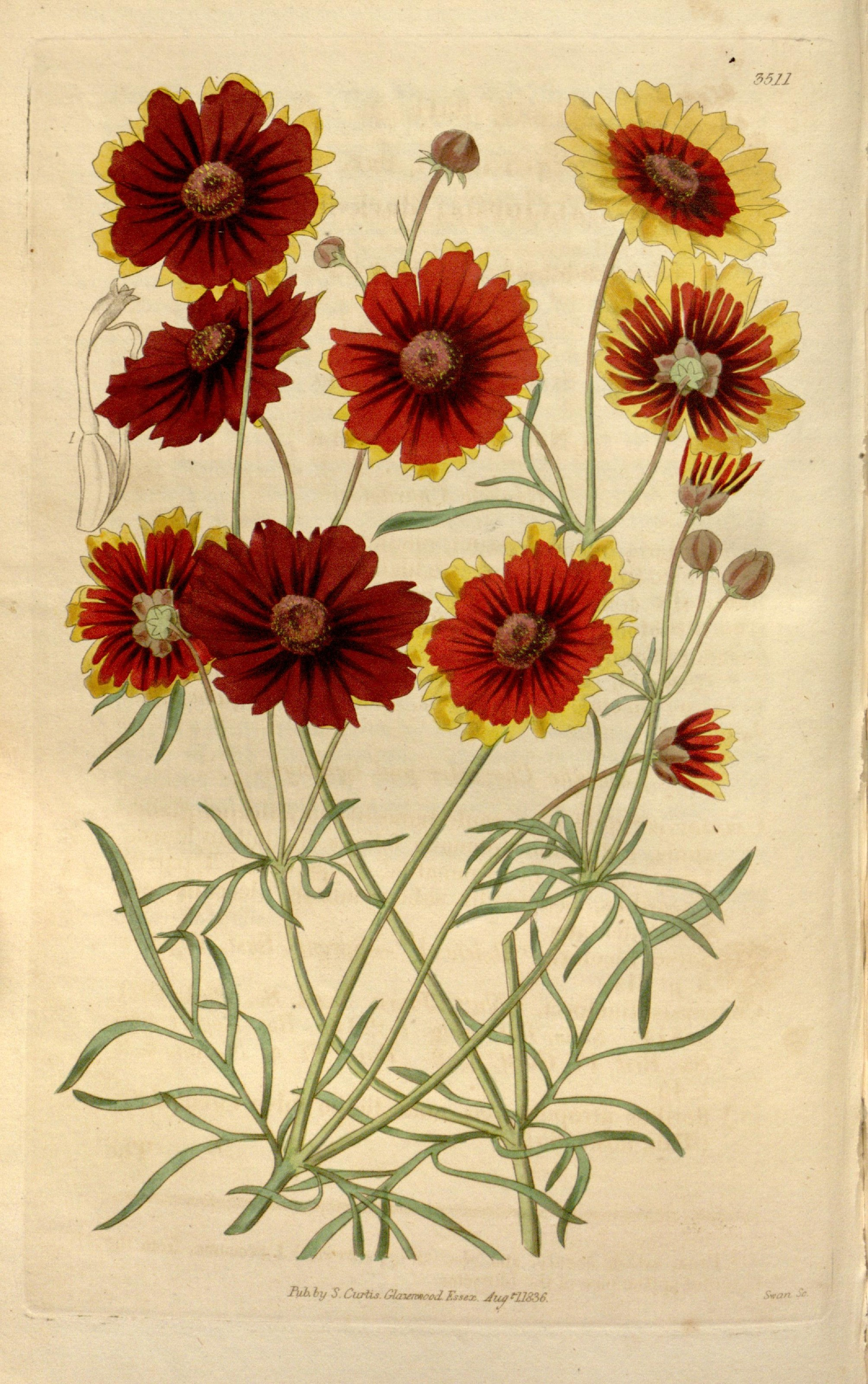
Illustration from 1836

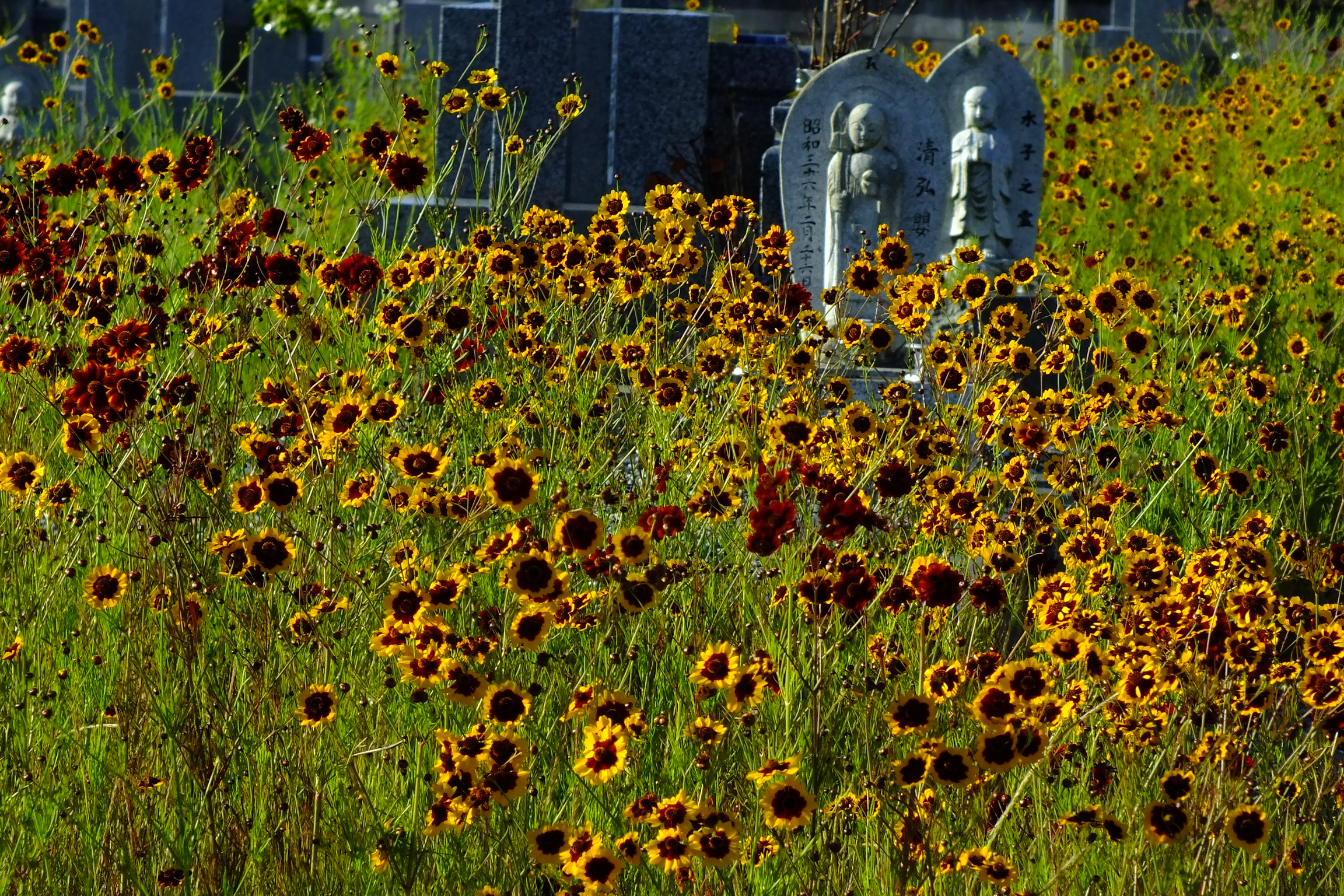
Coreopsis flowers blooming profusely across a Japanese cemetery (June 4th). Coreopsis was imported to Japan during the Meiji era and has since become naturalized.

Coreopsis tinctoria is native to most of the central United States. Within North America, it is thought to be introduced in the western and eastern United States and eastern Canada.

The species is widely grown residentially and commercially, and has become naturalized in China, and has been recorded as introduced into much of Europe, parts of Asia, and in Mozambique.

=== Habitat ===
In its native habitat, this species typically prefers to grow in moist, sandy (or clay) soil in habitats such as prairies, savannas, and plains at elevations of 0–2,000 m (0–6,562 ft) above sea level. Plants will readily grow in human-disturbed areas such as roadsides, ditches, and agricultural pastures.

== Ecology ==
Coreopsis tinctoria is pollinated by a wide variety of insects, including long-tongued bees, short-tongued bees, wasps, flies, butterflies and beetles. Coreopsis tinctoria serves as a larval host plant for various insects, such as Synchlora aerata, Tornos scolopacinarius and Calligrapha californica.

== Taxonomy ==
Coreopsis tinctoria was first formally named and described by Thomas Nuttall in 1821 in the Journal of the Academy of Natural Sciences of Philadelphia. It has been moved to the genera Bidens, Calliopsis and Diplosastera (in 1905, 1836, and 1823, respectively), however the name Coreopsis tinctoria has been retained by plant authorities such as PoWO, USDA Plants, and Flora of North America.

=== Etymology ===
The specific epithet tinctoria refers to the plant's use in dyeing. In English, this species is commonly known as plains coreopsis, garden coreopsis, golden coreopsis, and calliopsis. In French, this species is known as Coréopsis des teinturiers.

=== Varieties ===
Coreopsis tinctoria, as treated by PoWO and the Flora of North America, includes plants that others have treated as distinct subdivisions of C. tinctoria or as separate species.

Plants that are sometimes treated as separate from C. tinctoria include, but are not limited to;

- Coreopsis atkinsoniana Douglas ex Lindley - (plants 50-150 cm tall, mostly not branched from the base, cypselae with narrow wings, from the northwestern United States)
- Coreopsis cardaminifolia (De Candolle) Nuttall - (plants 20-50 cm tall, cypselae 2 mm long, rarely branched from the base, from the US (Texas north to Nebraska east to Arkansas))
- C. tinctoria var. similis (F. E. Boynton) H. M. Parker ex E. B. Smith - (plants 10-30 cm tall, almost always branched from the bases, cypselae with wide wings, from the US (southern Texas) and northern Mexico)

== Uses ==
The Zuni people traditionally use the blossoms of the tinctoria variety to make a mahogany red dye for yarn, and, until the introduction of coffee by traders, to make a hot beverage. Women also used an infusion of the whole plant of this variety, except for the root, if they desired a female child.

=== Cultivation ===
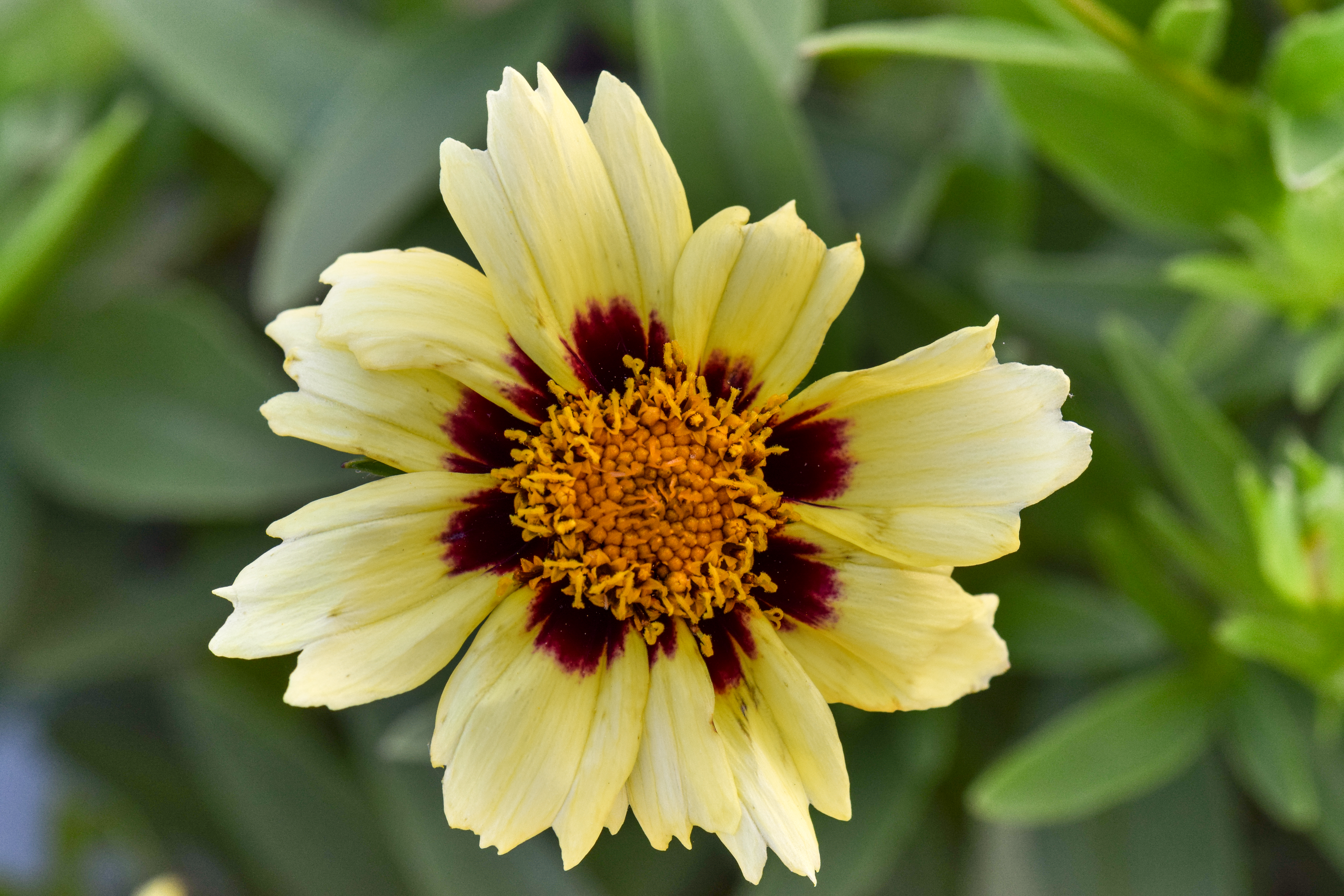
Coreopsis tinctoria cultivar Uptick Cream and Red.

Plains coreopsis is cultivated as an ornamental plant for gardens, and as a native plant for wildlife gardens and natural landscaping. It grows well in many types of soil, but seems to prefer sandy or well-drained loam soils. Although somewhat drought-tolerant, naturally growing plants are usually found in areas with regular rainfall. Preferring full sun, it will also grow in partial shade. Though plains coreopsis is often described as an annual some plants will behave more like biannuals growing larger and blooming more in their second year.

Cultivars

Because of its easy growing habits and the bright, showy flowers of cultivars such as 'Roulette' (tiger stripes of gold on a deep mahogany ground), plains coreopsis is increasingly used for landscape beautification and in flower gardens.
