= Western Gulf coastal grasslands =

Subtropical grassland ecoregion of Mexico and the United States

Western Gulf coastal grasslands Tamaulipan pastizal
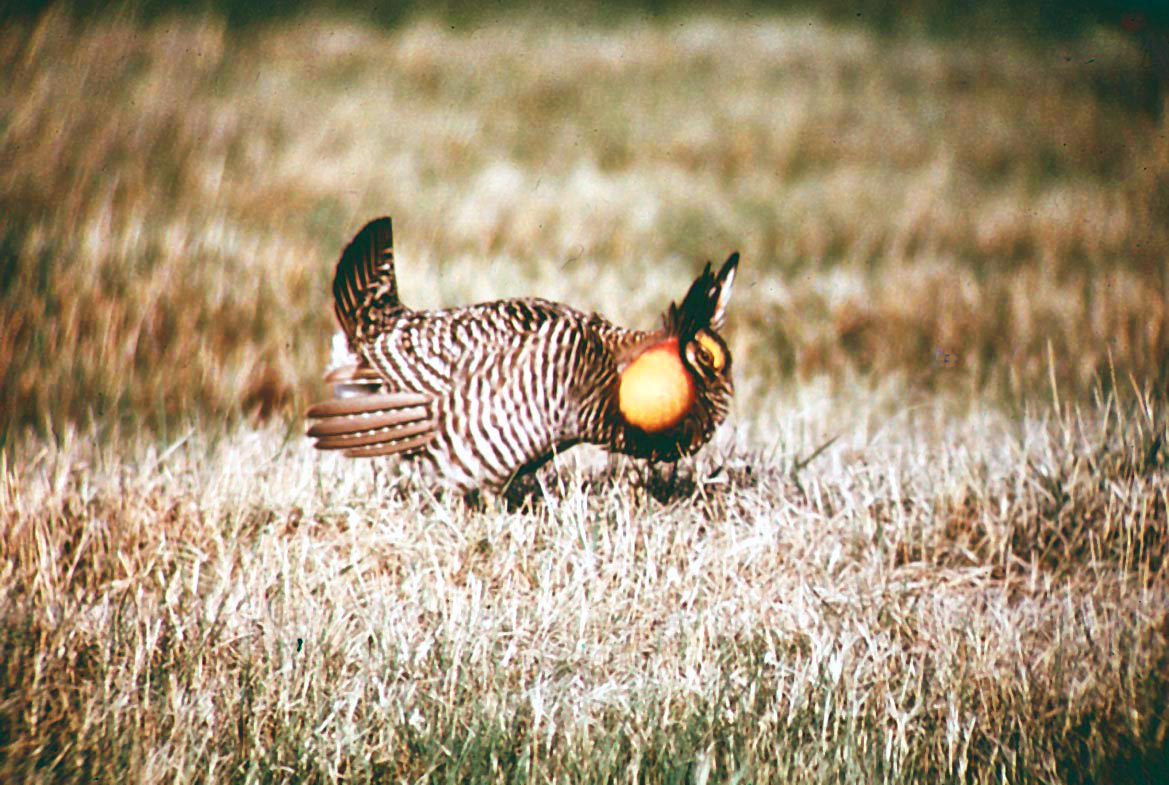

Ecology
- Realm: Nearctic
- Biome: Tropical and subtropical grasslands, savannas, and shrublands
- Borders: List: East Central Texas forests; Mississippi lowland forests; Piney Woods forests; Southeastern conifer forests; Tamaulipan mezquital; Veracruz moist forests
- Bird species: 335
- Mammal species: 75

Geography
- Area: 77,425 km^{2} (29,894 mi^{2})
- Countries: Mexico; United States
- States: Louisiana; Tamaulipas; Texas
- Climate type: Humid subtropical (Cfa)

Conservation
- Habitat loss: 48.734%
- Protected: 10.31%

The Western Gulf coastal grasslands (Spanish: Pastizales costeros del Golfo Occidental) are a subtropical grassland ecoregion of the southern United States and northeastern Mexico. It is known in Louisiana as the "Cajun Prairie", Texas as "Coastal Prairie," and as the Tamaulipan pastizal (Spanish: Pastizal Tamaulipeco) in Mexico.

== Setting ==
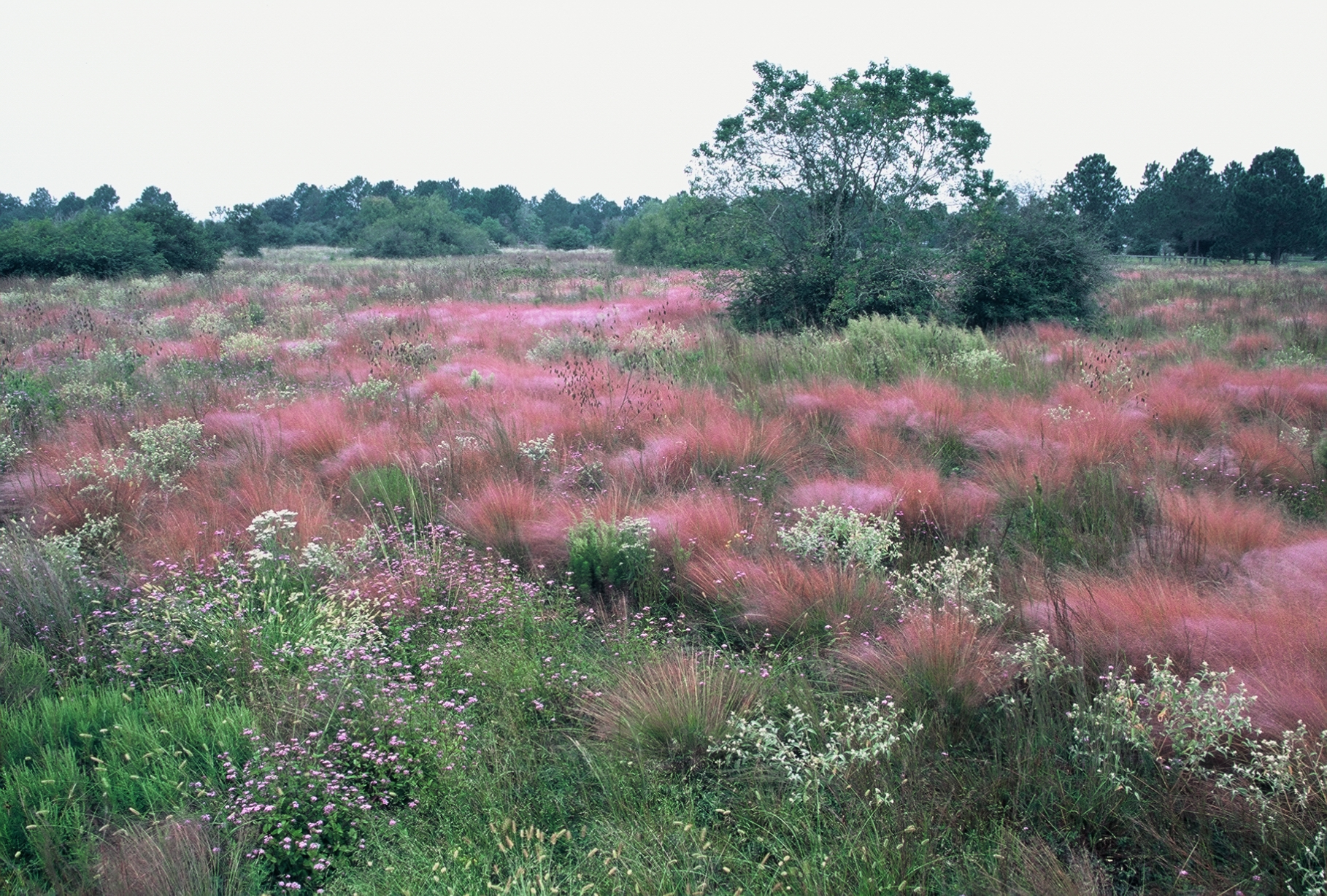
Williams Prairie, a 10-acre (40,000 m2) remnant prairie preserve west of Houston in Waller County, Texas, USA

The ecoregion covers an area of 77,425 km^{2} (29,894 sq mi), extending along the shore of the Gulf of Mexico from southeastern Louisiana (west of the Mississippi Delta) through Texas and into the Mexican state of Tamaulipas as far as the Laguna Madre. Specific areas include a number of barrier islands, and the resacas or natural levees of the Laguna Madre. The coast is vulnerable to tropical storms that can seriously damage habitats.

This ecosystem, in part, has edaphic origins: the soils of this ecoregion feature poor internal drainage, often under alfisols and vertisol. In combination with frequent fires, tree seedlings have a harder time settling, allowing grasses and other herbaceous species to dominate. This process is understood in the context of "subtropical hyperseasonal grasslands", similar to the Florida dry prairie.

However, there are interspersed areas of higher sand and silt content that break up the otherwise heavy clay environment: these areas typically correspond to floodplain/riparian zones, and are more permissive of tree-growth, featuring galleries or even closed-canopy bottomland expanses.

== Climate ==
From Southwest Louisiana west to the Upper Texas coast, the climate is wet humid subtropical, featuring significal annual precipitation. The climate becomes more arid farther south along the Texas coast into northeastern Mexico, though precipitation totals still remain high enough for the humid subtropical classification.

== Flora ==
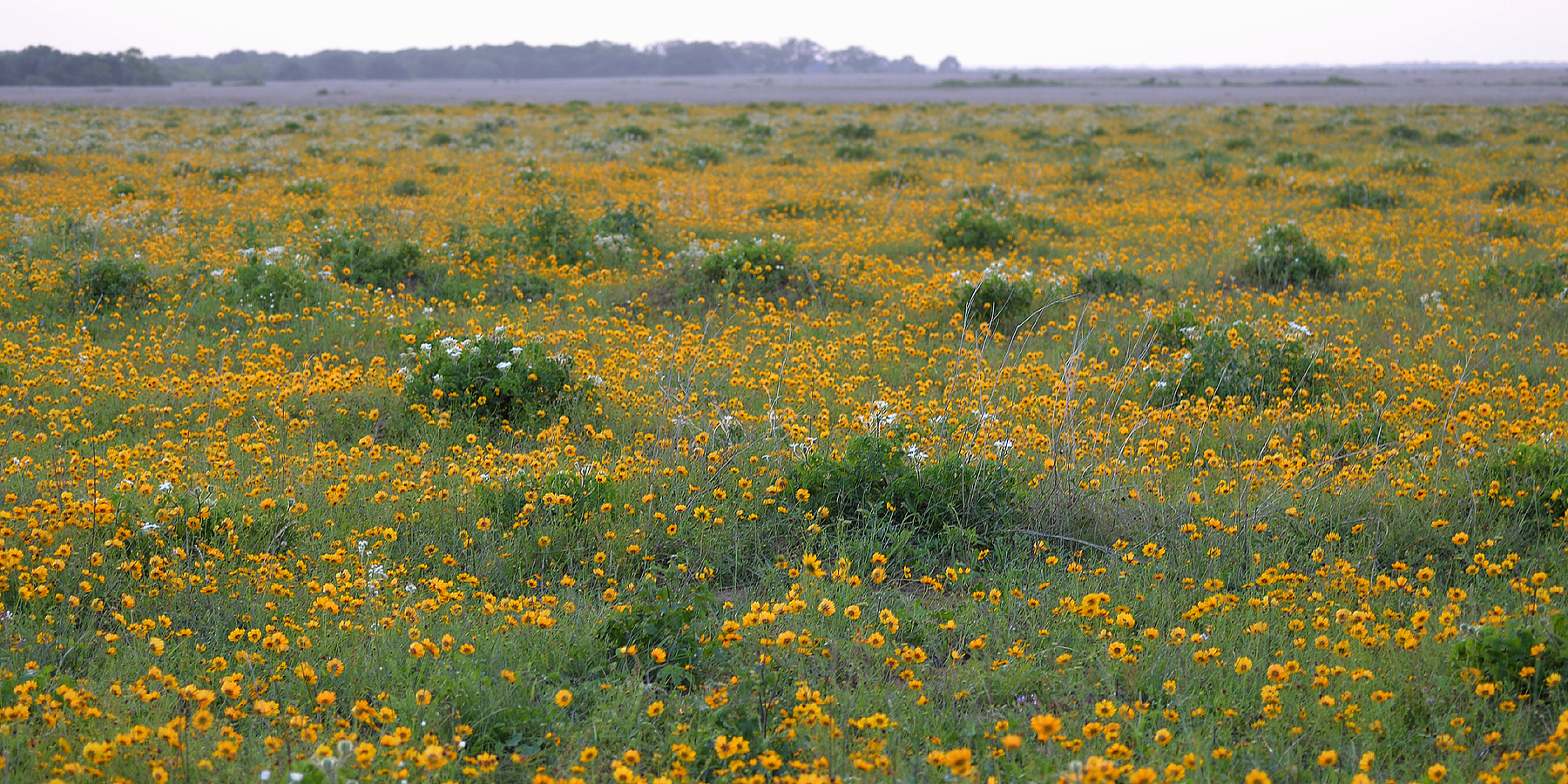
Grassland with Texas bullnettle (Cnidoscolus texanus) and Plains coeropsis (Coreopsis tinctoria)

The natural habitat of the area is a mix of tallgrass prairie similar to those found in inland Texas, with Indiangrass (Sorghastrum nutans), big bluestem (Andropogon gerardi), little bluestem (Schizachyrium scoparium), and switchgrass (Panicum virgatum) the primary tallgrass species that are typical of the coastal prairie, with several other shorter grasses and many herbaceous and woody species.

Separating the grassier habitats are bottomland forests and woodlands, which are present within the floodplains of the region's many waterways. In the wetter climate covering the zone from Southwest Louisiana west through the upper Texas coast, these bottomlands contain many species typical in forests elsewhere across the Southern United States, such as the southern live oak, bald cypress, magnolia, loblolly pine, post oak, and southern hackberry. Farther south, from the lower one third of the Texas coast and through the Tamaulipan stretch, the drier climate supports shrubby areas of honey mesquite (Prosopis glandulosa), huisache (Vachellia farnesiana var. farnesiana), lime prickly-ash (Zanthoxylum fagara), and Texas persimmon (Diospyros texana). Ferns such as the Christmas Fern (Polystichum acrostichoides), Cinnamon Fern (Osmundastrum cinnamomeum) and the Bracken are all found here.

== Fauna ==
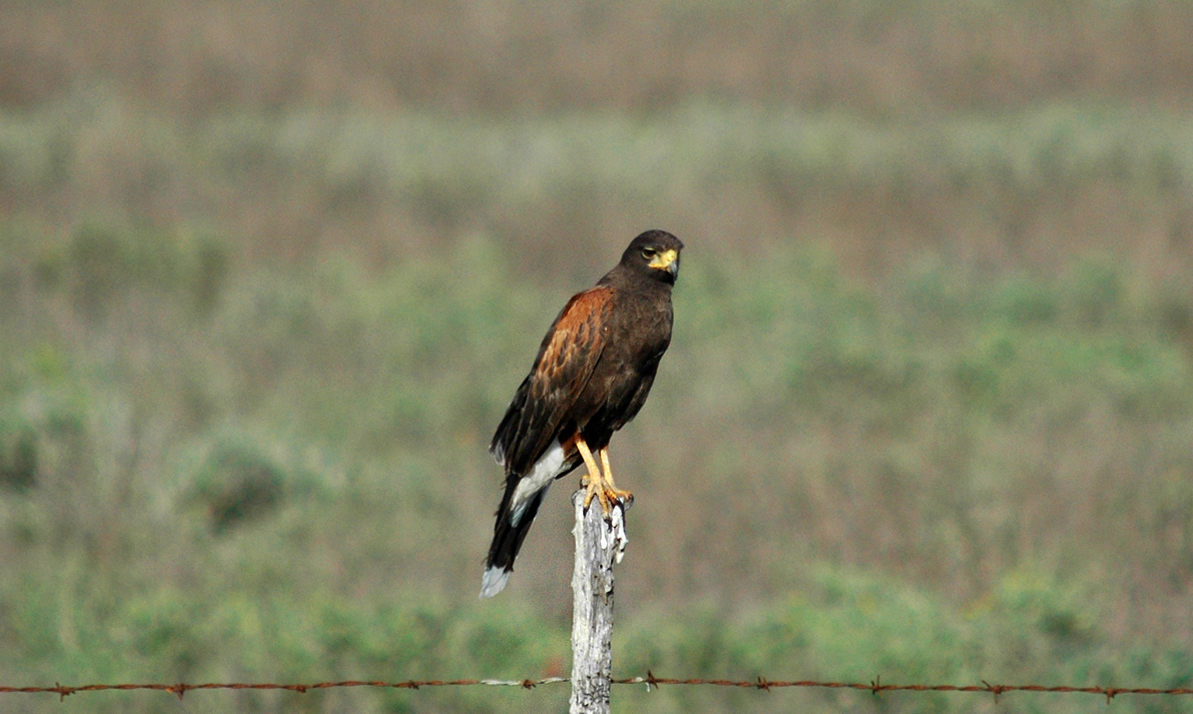
Harris's hawk (Parabuteo unicinctus), Tamaulipas, Mexico

This coast is rich in wildlife, and 700 species of birds, animals and reptiles have been counted here, although many are now threatened or endangered. This coast is a critical habitat for the Attwater's prairie chickens (Tympanuchus cupido attwateri), over one million of which inhabited the prairie in Texas and Louisiana in the 19th century, but extreme reduction of their habitat put them on the U.S. endangered species list in 1967. Another endangered bird of the coast is the whooping crane (Grus americana). Many species of wading birds, shorebirds, and other waterbirds are abundant. Birds in the Mexican part of the region include Morelet’s seedeater (Sporophila morelleti), red-billed pigeon (Columba flavirostris), brown jay (Cyanocorax morio), Neotropic cormorant, white-winged dove (Leptotila verrequxi) and Audubon's oriole (Icterus graduacauda).

Mammals of the area include bobcats, collared peccary, white-tailed deer, eastern cottontails, with ocelot (Leopardus pardalis), Gulf Coast jaguarundi (Puma yagouaroundi cacomitli), southern yellow bat (Lasiurus ega), and Mexican spiny pocket mouse (Liomys irroratus) more abundant in Mexico. Rancho Nuevo beach in Tamaulipas and along the Texas coast are the only nesting sites in the world for the Kemp's ridley sea turtle (Lepidochelys kempii) while other herpetofauna of the southern part of the ecoregion include Río Grande chirping frog (Eleutherodactylus cystignathoides) and Mexican white-lipped frog (Leptodactylus fragilis).

== Threats and preservation ==
Less than 1% of the ecoregion remains in pristine condition, almost entirely in Texas, while most of the coast has been converted to farmland, including rice paddies, grazing land, or urban areas including Houston, Texas. Estuaries and other coastal wetlands are better preserved than the prairie and indeed the protected areas of the coast are mainly sanctuaries for waterbirds.

== Human use ==
Largely because of the region's flatness and grassland potential, a higher percentage of the land is in cropland than in bordering ecological regions. Rice, grain sorghum, cotton, and soybeans are the principal crops. Urban and industrial land uses have expanded greatly in recent decades, and oil and gas production is common.

== EPA Level IV ecoregions ==
The Western Gulf Coastal Plain is a Level III ecoregion in the US Environmental Protection Agency's scheme of US ecoregions. It is roughly coextensive with the Western Gulf coastal grasslands, with the important exception that the EPA-defined area terminates at the national boundary, while the natural ecoregion extends into northeastern Mexico. In the EPA's definition, the principal distinguishing characteristics of the Western Gulf Coastal Plain are its relatively flat topography and mainly grassland potential natural vegetation. Inland from this region the plains are older, more irregular, and have mostly forest or savanna-type vegetation potentials. The EPA identifies ten Level IV ecoregions: Northern Humid Gulf Coastal Prairies; Southern Subhumid Gulf Coastal Prairies; Floodplains and Low Terraces; Coastal Sand Plain; Lower Rio Grande Valley; Lower Rio Grande Alluvial Floodplain; Texas–Louisiana Coastal Marshes; Mid-Coast Barrier Islands and Coastal Marshes; Laguna Madre Barrier Islands and Coastal Marshes; and Lafayette Loess Plains.

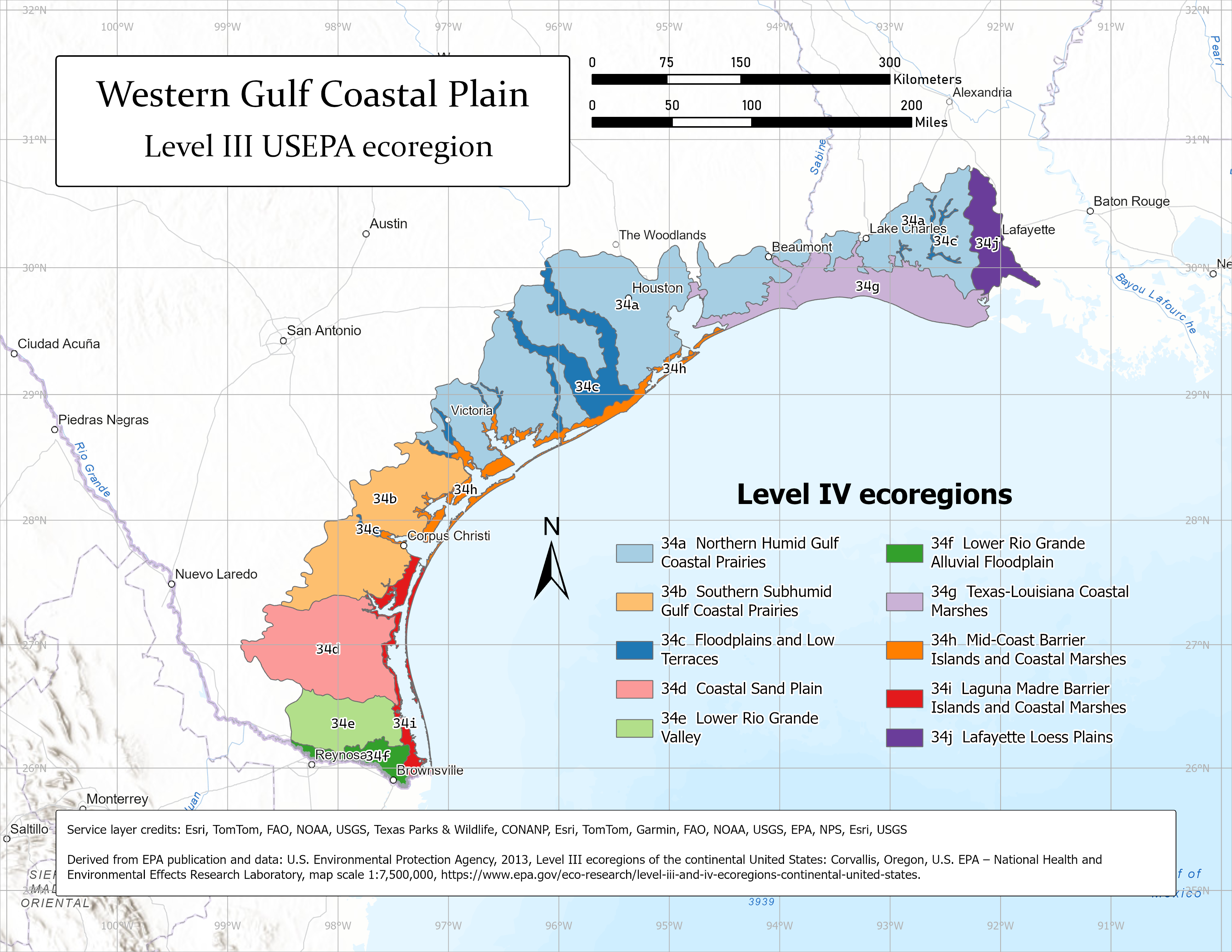
Map of the Western Gulf Coastal Plain USEPA ecoregion

=== Northern Humid Gulf Coastal Prairies (34a) ===
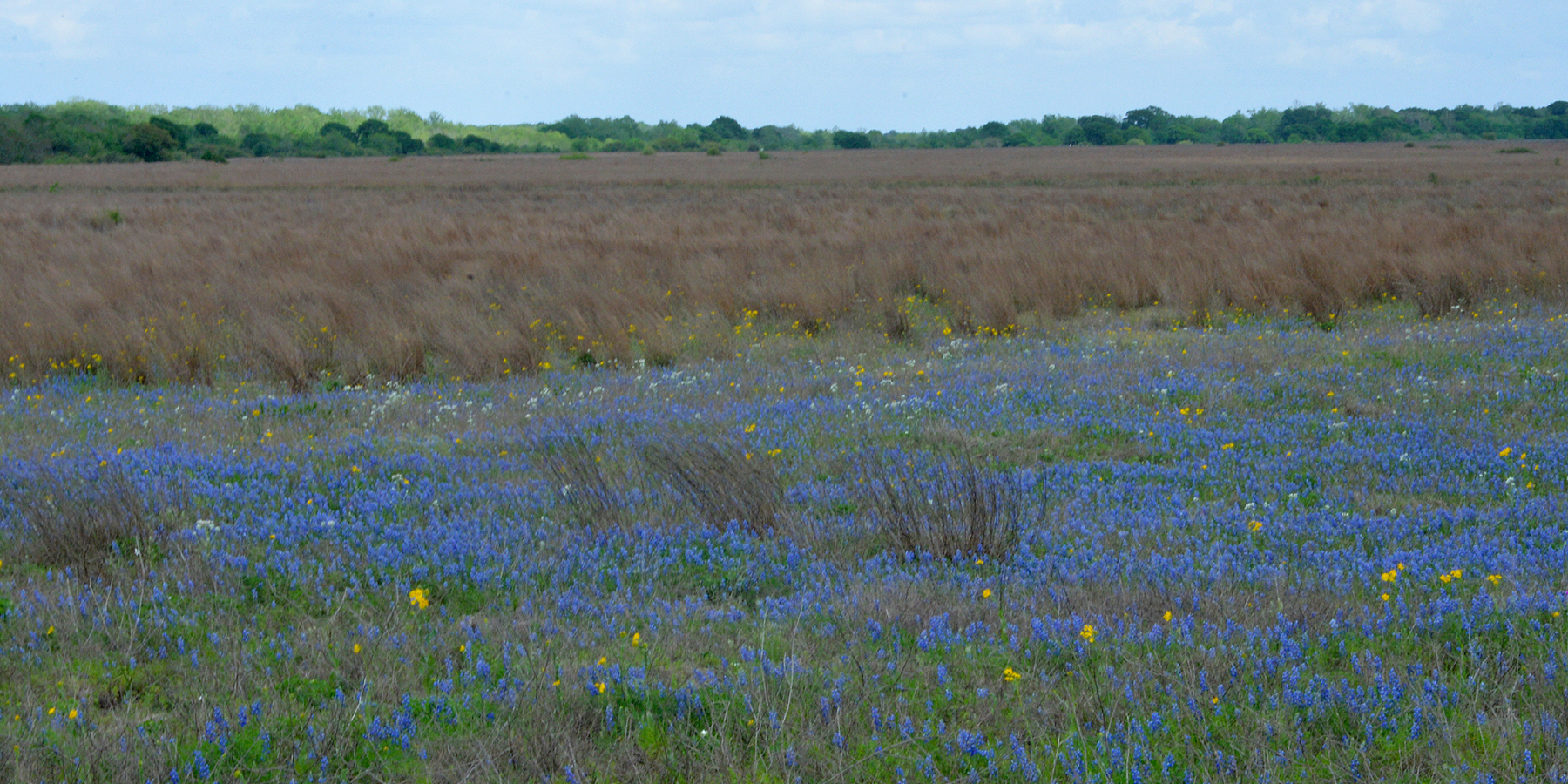
Texas bluebonnets (Lupinus texensis) in ecoregion 34a

Quaternary-age deltaic sands, silts, and clays underlie much of the Northern Humid Gulf Coastal Prairies on this gently sloping coastal plain. The original vegetation was mostly grasslands with a few clusters of oaks, known as oak mottes or maritime woodlands. Little bluestem, Indiangrass, brownseed paspalum, gulf muhly, and switchgrass were the dominant grassland species, with some similarities to the grasslands of the Texas Blackland Prairies (ecoregion 32). Almost all of the coastal prairies have been converted to cropland, rangeland, pasture, or urban land uses. The exotic Chinese tallow tree and Chinese privet have invaded large areas in this region. Some loblolly pine occurs in the northern part of the region in the transition to the South Central Plains (ecoregion 35). Soils are mostly fine-textured: clay, clay loam, or sandy clay loam. Within the region, there are some differences from the higher Lissie Formation to the lower Beaumont Formation, both of Pleistocene age. The Lissie Formation has lighter colored soils, mostly Alfisols with sandy clay loam surface texture, while darker, clayey soils associated with Vertisols are more typical of the Beaumont Formation. Annual precipitation varies from 37 inches (94 cm) in the southwest portion to 58 inches (150 cm) in the northeast, with a summer maximum.

=== Southern Subhumid Gulf Coastal Prairies (34b) ===
The Southern Subhumid Gulf Coastal Prairies ecoregion is drier than Ecoregion 34a to the north, not only receiving less annual precipitation, but also typically experiencing summer drought. Annual precipitation ranges from 26 inches (66 cm) in the southwest to 37 inches (94 cm) in the northeast, with May and September peaks. Soils are hyperthermic compared to thermic in most of Ecoregion 34a. Little bluestem, yellow Indiangrass, and tall dropseed were once dominant grasses. Eragrostoid grasses, including the genera Bouteloua, Buchloe, Eragrostis, Hilaria, and Setaria increase in importance in Ecoregion 34b compared to 34a. Invasive species such as honey mesquite and huisache are a concern. Almost all of the coastal prairies have been converted to other land uses: cropland, pasture, or urban and industrial.

=== Floodplains and Low Terraces (34c) ===
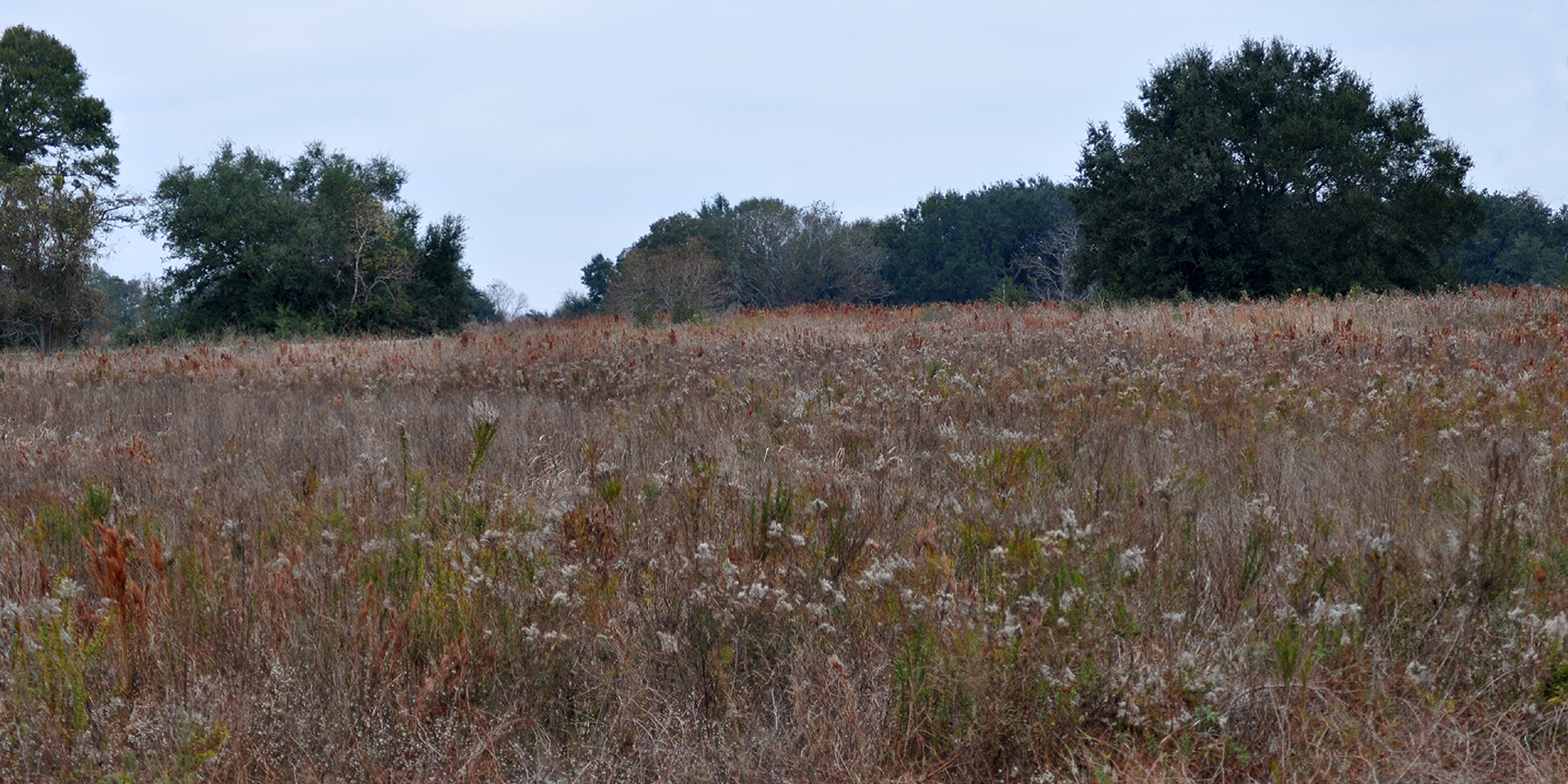
Brazos Bend State Park, on the boundary of ecoregion 34c

Covering primarily the Holocene floodplain and low terrace deposits, the Floodplains and Low Terraces ecoregion, especially to the southwest, has a different bottomland forest than the floodplains of the South Central Plains (ecoregion 35). Bottomland forests of pecan, water oak, southern live oak, and elm, are typical, with some bald cypress on larger streams. The Brazos and Colorado River floodplains are a broad expanse of alluvial sediments, while floodplains to the south are more narrow. Soils include Vertisols, Mollisols, and Entisols. Large portions of floodplain forest have been removed and land cover is now a mix of forest, cropland, and pasture.

=== Coastal Sand Plain (34d) ===
The Coastal Sand Plain ecoregion provides a distinct break in both vegetation and surficial materials from the fine-textured soil grasslands of the Southern Subhumid Gulf Coastal Prairies (34b) to the north. This sand sheet landscape consists of active and (mostly) stabilized sand dune deposits with lesser amounts of silt sheet deposits (silt and fine sand) to the north. This depositional plain is characterized by a closed internal drainage system with only occasional discontinuous drainage remnants due to sand movement. Closed depressions pond water in response to seasonal and tropical storm precipitation. Soils developed on these parent sediments are Entisols and Alfisols with thick sand surfaces. The dominant grasses on the coastal sand ridges and islands extend inland covering parts of the sand plain. Vegetation is mostly mid and tall grasses such as seacoast bluestem (Schizachyrium littorale), switchgrass, gulfdune paspalum (Paspalum monostachyum), fringeleaf paspalum, sandbur, purple threeawn, pricklypear, and catclaw with an overstory of southern live oak and honey mesquite trees. The potholes have a variety of bulrushes and sedges. Most of the Coastal Sand Plain has been moderately to heavily grazed, and large areas have been converted to non-native range or pasture grasses. The region has little cropland compared to the Southern Subhumid Gulf Coastal Prairies (34b).

=== Lower Rio Grande Valley (34e) ===
The Lower Rio Grande Valley ecoregion once supported dense, diverse grassland and shrub communities and low woodlands. However, mesquite, granjeno (spiny hackberry), and a variety of brush and shrub species invaded the landscape. Now, it is almost all in cropland, pasture, and urban land cover. The region is underlain by a mix of Quaternary clays and sands with some Miocene-age sediments of the Goliad Formation at the western edge. Mollisols are extensive, and the soils are deep, mostly clay loams and sandy clay loams. The freeze-free growing season is often over 320 days compared to 250–260 days along the northern Texas coastal area of the Northern Humid Gulf Coastal Prairies (34a). Along with the Lower Rio Grande Alluvial Floodplain (34f), the Lower Rio Grande Valley contains important nesting grounds for the white-winged dove, a favored hunting species in southern Texas.

=== Lower Rio Grande Alluvial Floodplain (34f) ===
Palo Alto Battlefield National Historical Park is in ecoregion 34f

The Lower Rio Grande Alluvial Floodplain ecoregion includes the Holocene-age alluvial sands and clays of the Rio Grande floodplain that are now almost completely in cropland or urban land cover. The soils, mostly Vertisols and Mollisols, are deep, loamy and clayey, and tend to be finer-textured than in the Lower Rio Grande Valley (34e) to the north. Some Entisols and Inceptisols occur near the river. The floodplain ridges once had abundant palm trees, and early Spanish explorers called the river "Rio de las Palmas." Most large palm trees and floodplain forests had been cleared by the early 1900s. A few small pieces of unique floodplain forests remain, including Texas ebony, Texas palmetto, and sugar hackberry–cedar elm floodplain forests. It is the most subtropical climate of Texas, but hard freezes occasionally occur, affecting plants and animals that are at the northern limit of their range. Crops include cotton, citrus, grain sorghum, sugar cane, vegetables, and melons. The Rio Grande’s water is mostly diverted from its channel for irrigation and urban use, and little or no flow reaches the Gulf of Mexico. Both the Central and Mississippi flyways funnel through the southern tip of Texas and many species of birds reach their extreme northernmost range in this region. In addition, subtropical, temperate, coastal, and desert influences converge here, allowing for great species diversity. Nearly 500 bird species, including neotropical migratory birds, shorebirds, raptors, and waterfowl, can be found here.

=== Texas–Louisiana Coastal Marshes (34g) ===
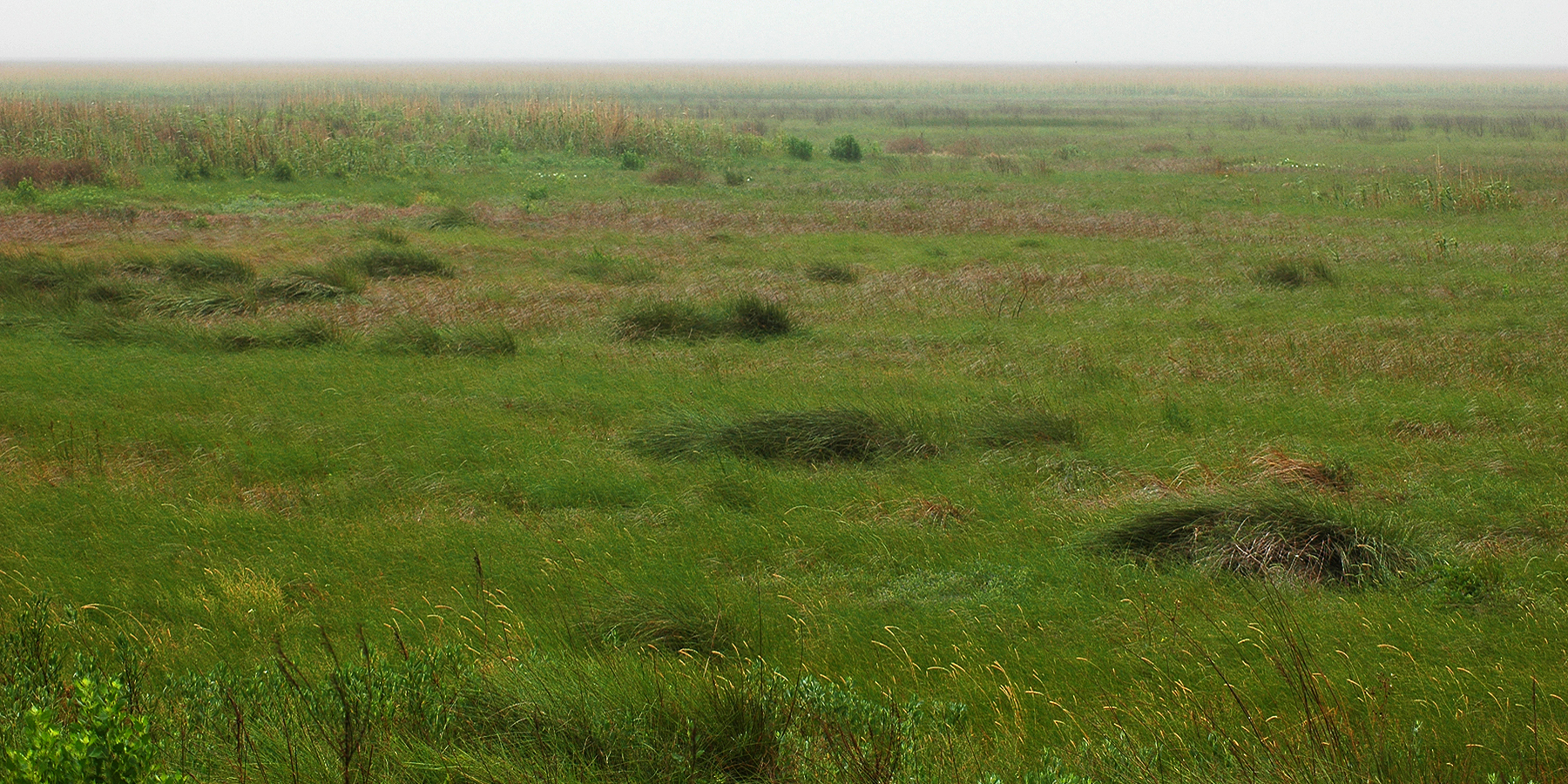
McFaddin National Wildlife Refuge in ecoregion 34g

The Texas–Louisiana Coastal Marshes region is distinguished from ecoregions 34h and 34i by its extensive freshwater and saltwater coastal marshes, lack of barrier islands and fewer bays, and its wetter, more humid climate. Annual precipitation is 48 to 54 inches (120 to 140 cm) in Texas and up to 60 inches (150 cm) in Louisiana. There are many rivers, lakes, bayous, tidal channels, and canals. The streams and rivers that supply nutrients and sediments to this region are primarily from the humid pine belt of the South Central Plains (ecoregion 35). Extensive cordgrass marshes occur. The estuarine and marsh complex supports marine life, supplies wintering grounds for ducks and geese, and provides habitat for small mammals and American alligators. Brown shrimp, the most commercially important marine species in Texas, is common along the whole coast, but in this northern coastal zone white shrimp are also commercially important. Eastern oysters and blue crabs are also common and commercially important in the region. Sport fishery species such as red drum, black drum, southern flounder, and spotted seatrout occur throughout the coastal bays of this region and ecoregion 34h.

=== Mid-Coast Barrier Islands and Coastal Marshes (34h) ===
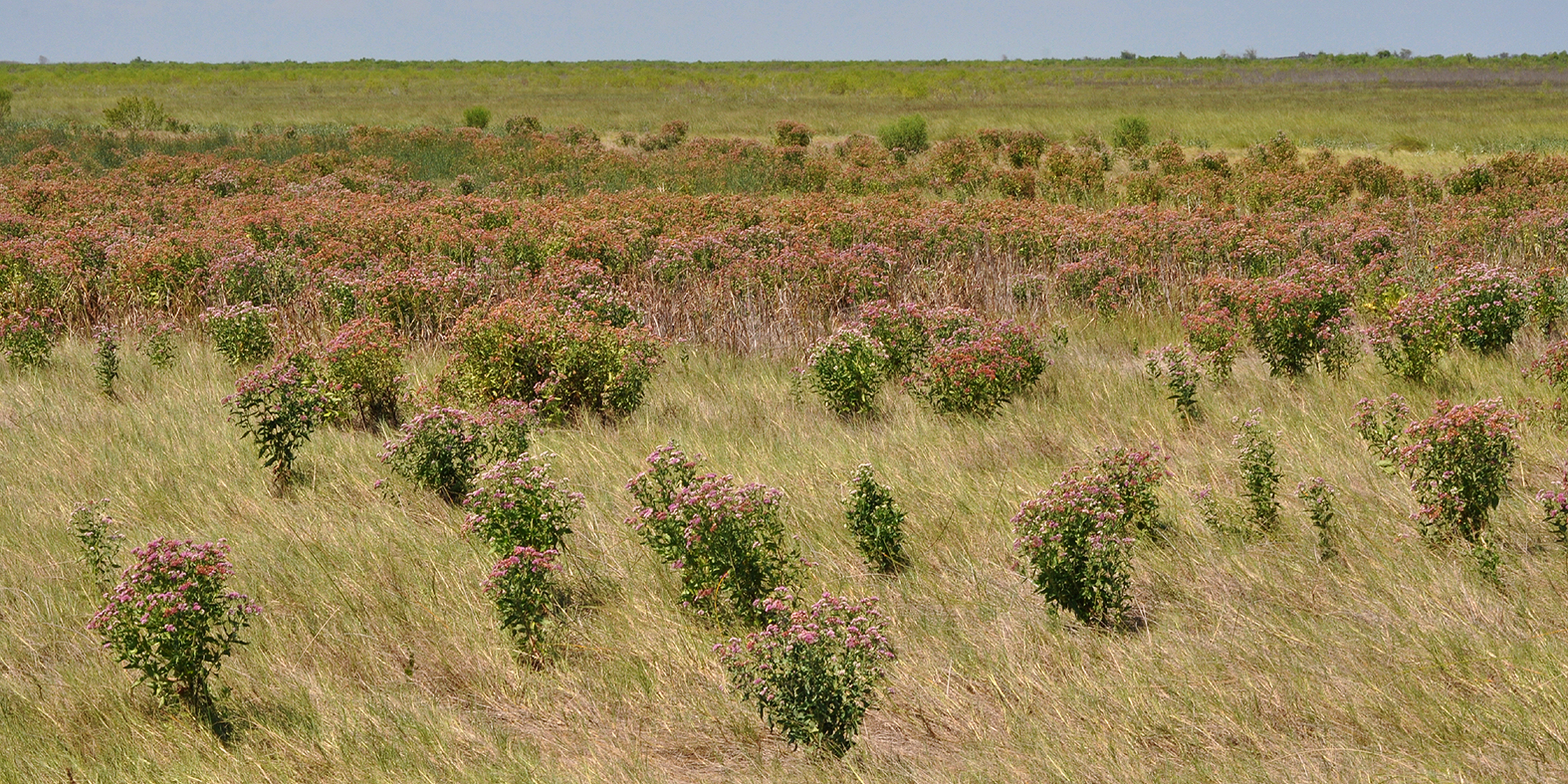
Saltmarsh fleabane (Pluchea odorata) in ecoregion 34h

The Mid-Coast Barrier Islands and Coastal Marshes portion of the Texas coast is subhumid compared to the humid climate of Ecoregion 34g to the northeast and to the semiarid climate of ecoregion 34i to the south. Annual precipitation within ecoregion 34h increases to the northeast, ranging from 34 to 46 inches (86 to 117 cm). The region encompasses primarily Holocene deposits with saline, brackish, and freshwater marshes, barrier islands with minor washover fans, and tidal flat sands and clays. In the inland section from Matagorda Bay to Corpus Christi Bay, Pleistocene barrier island deposits occur. Typical soils on the coastal marshes are Entisols, with a minor extent of Histosols. Mollisols occur on tidal flats and coastal marshes, and Entisols form in sandy barrier islands and dunes. Smooth cordgrass, marsh hay cordgrass, and gulf saltgrass dominate in more saline zones. Other native vegetation is mainly grassland composed of seacoast bluestem, sea-oats, common reed, gulfdune paspalum, and soilbind morning-glory. Some areas have clumps of sweetbay, redbay, and dwarf southern live oak trees. In the Coastal Bend area, the barrier islands support extensive foredunes and back-island dune fields. Scarps can characterize bay margins due to beach erosion. Salt marsh and wind-tidal flats are mostly confined to the back side of the barrier islands with fresh or brackish marshes associated with river-mouth delta areas. Marsh hay cordgrass becomes less important to the south in this region. Black mangrove begins to appear from Port O'Connor south. This area of the coast has all three commercially important species of shrimp as well as important oyster and blue crab fisheries. Convergence of longshore currents from north and south occurs south of the Corpus Christi area near Padre Island National Seashore. Corpus Christi Bay serves as the ecozone or boundary between two distinct estuarine ecosystems. Copano and Mesquite Bays to the north are low to moderate-salinity bays and attract whooping cranes and other birdlife. To the south in 34i, hypersaline Laguna Madre forms a unique ecosystem and supports greater expanses of seagrasses.

=== Laguna Madre Barrier Islands and Coastal Marshes (34i) ===
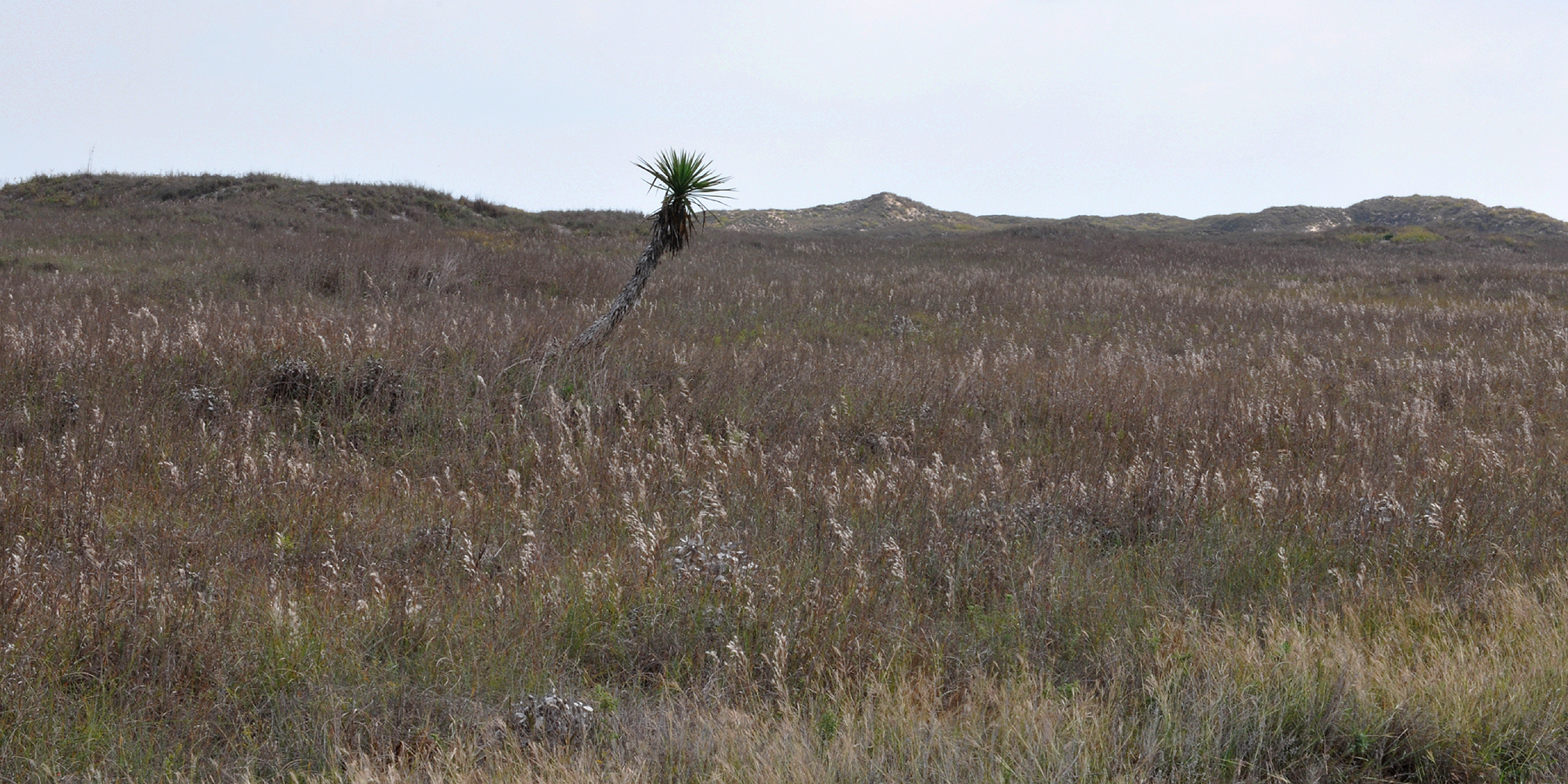
Padre Island National Seashore in ecoregion 34i

The Laguna Madre Barrier Islands and Coastal Marshes ecoregion is distinguished by its hypersaline lagoon system, vast seagrass meadows, wide tidal mud flats, large overwintering redhead duck population, numerous protected species, great fishery productivity, and a narrow barrier island with a number of washover fans. The lower coastal zone in Texas has a more semi-arid climate and has less precipitation, 27–29 inches (69–74 cm), compared to 34g and 34h. There is extreme variability in annual rainfall, and evapotranspiration is generally two to three times greater than precipitation. As no rivers drain into the Texas Laguna Madre, the lagoon water can be hypersaline. Combined with the Laguna Madre of Tamaulipas, it is the largest hypersaline system in the world. The shallow depth, clear water, and warm climate of this lagoon are conducive to seagrass production. Nearly 80% of all seagrass beds in Texas are now found in the Laguna Madre. The food web of the Laguna Madre is predominantly based on this submerged aquatic vegetation (seagrass and algae), rather than free-floating phytoplankton. Because of the hypersalinity, oysters are not commercially harvested to a large extent, although the region does contain the only strain of high-salinity adapted oysters in North America. The blue crab harvest is also smaller than the other two coastal regions to the north. Pink shrimp make up an important part of the commercial harvest while white shrimp are more abundant to the north in 34g. The historically highly productive commercial fisheries have now given way to an important sport fishery for species such as red drum, black drum, and spotted sea trout. Marshes are less extensive on the southern coast. A few stands of black mangrove tidal shrub occur in this region.

=== Lafayette Loess Plains (34j) ===
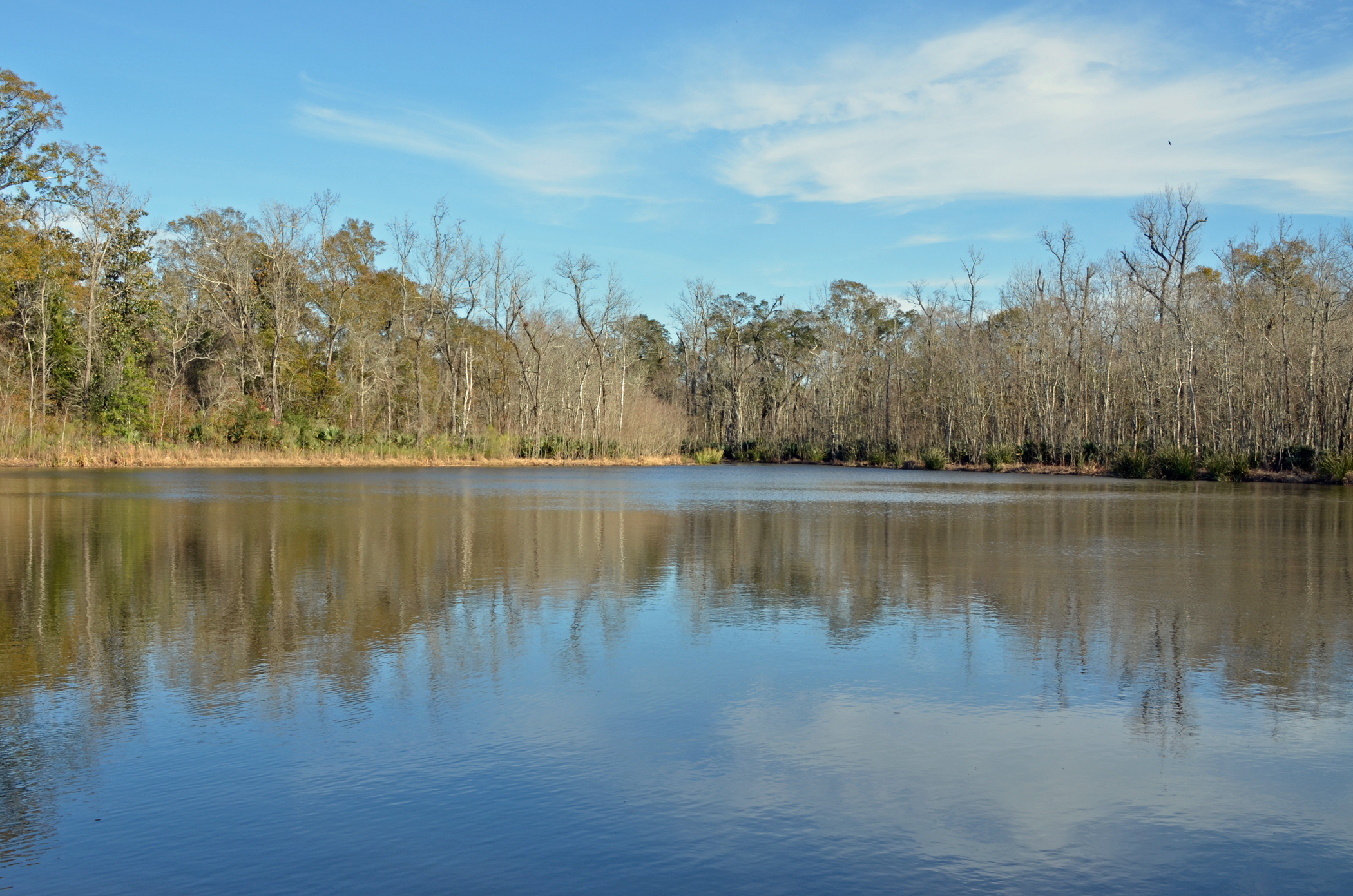
Palmetto Island State Park is in ecoregion 34j

The Lafayette Loess Plains had coastal prairie natural vegetation similar to the Northern Humid Gulf Coastal Prairies (34a), but are capped with a loess veneer associated with the Mississippi Valley. Well to poorly drained Alfisols and Mollisols with silt loam surface textures developed on the late Pleistocene-age terraces. The historical vegetation dominated by big bluestem, little bluestem, yellow Indiangrass, switchgrass, and other herbaceous species has been replaced by crops of rice, soybeans, cotton, sugarcane, sweet potatoes, and wheat, along with crawfish aquaculture. Urban expansion in the area has been substantial. There is more pasture compared to the large extent of small grains production in ecoregion 34a to the west. Narrow hardwood forests occur along some streams and lowlands.

== See also ==
- List of ecoregions in Mexico
- List of ecoregions in the United States (WWF)
- Northern Humid Gulf Coastal Prairies (34a) map
- Southern Subhumid Gulf Coastal Prairies (34b) map
- Floodplains and Low Terraces (34c) map
- Coastal Sand Plain (34d) map
- Lower Rio Grande Valley (34e) map
- Lower Rio Grande Alluvial Floodplain (34f) map
- Texas–Louisiana Coastal Marshes (34g) map
- Mid-Coast Barrier Islands and Coastal Marshes (34h) map
- Laguna Madre Barrier Islands and Coastal Marshes (34i) map
- Lafayette Loess Plains (34j) map
