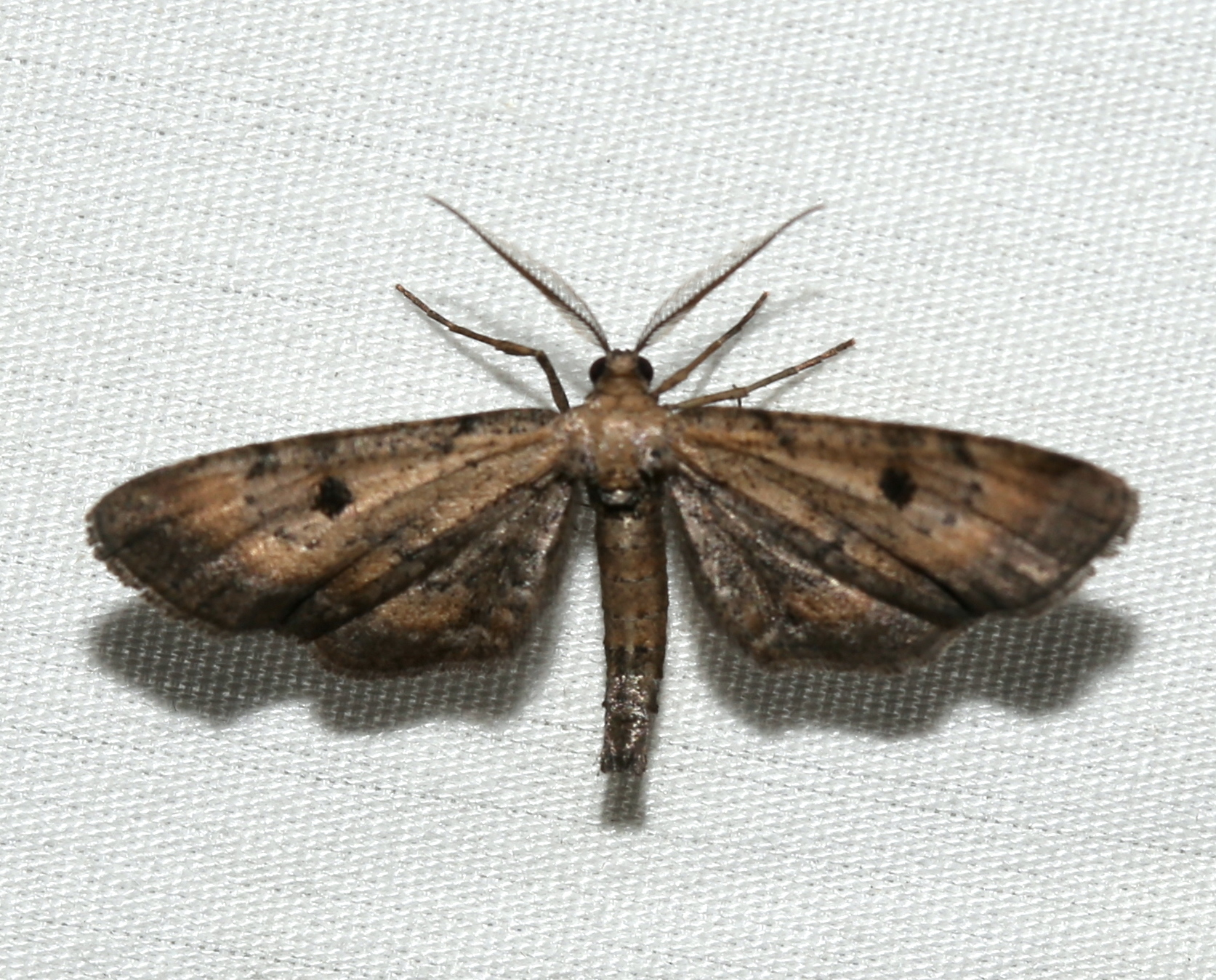

Scientific classification
- Kingdom: Animalia
- Phylum: Arthropoda
- Clade: Pancrustacea
- Class: Insecta
- Order: Lepidoptera
- Family: Geometridae
- Genus: Tornos
- Species: T. abjectarius

Binomial name
- Tornos abjectarius Hulst, 1887

= Tornos abjectarius =

Species of moth

Tornos abjectarius is a species of geometrid moth in the family Geometridae. It is found in North America.

== Subspecies ==
These four subspecies belong to the species Tornos abjectarius:

- Tornos abjectarius abjectarius
- Tornos abjectarius calcasiata Cassino & Swett, 1923
- Tornos abjectarius kimballi Rindge, 1954
- Tornos abjectarius ravus Rindge, 1954
