= Tornos cinctarius =

Scientific classification
- Kingdom: Animalia
- Phylum: Arthropoda
- Clade: Pancrustacea
- Class: Insecta
- Order: Lepidoptera
- Family: Geometridae
- Genus: Tornos
- Species: T. cinctarius

Binomial name
- Tornos cinctarius Hulst, 1887

Species of moth

Tornos cinctarius is a species of geometrid moth in the family Geometridae. It is found in North America.
