= Tornos erectarius =

Scientific classification
- Domain: Eukaryota
- Kingdom: Animalia
- Phylum: Arthropoda
- Class: Insecta
- Order: Lepidoptera
- Family: Geometridae
- Tribe: Boarmiini
- Genus: Tornos
- Species: T. erectarius

Binomial name
- Tornos erectarius Grossbeck, 1909

Species of moth

Tornos erectarius is a species of geometrid moth in the family Geometridae. It is found in Central America and North America.

The MONA or Hodges number for Tornos erectarius is 6484.

== Subspecies ==
These two subspecies belong to the species Tornos erectarius:

- Tornos erectarius erectarius
- Tornos erectarius fieldi Grossbeck, 1912
