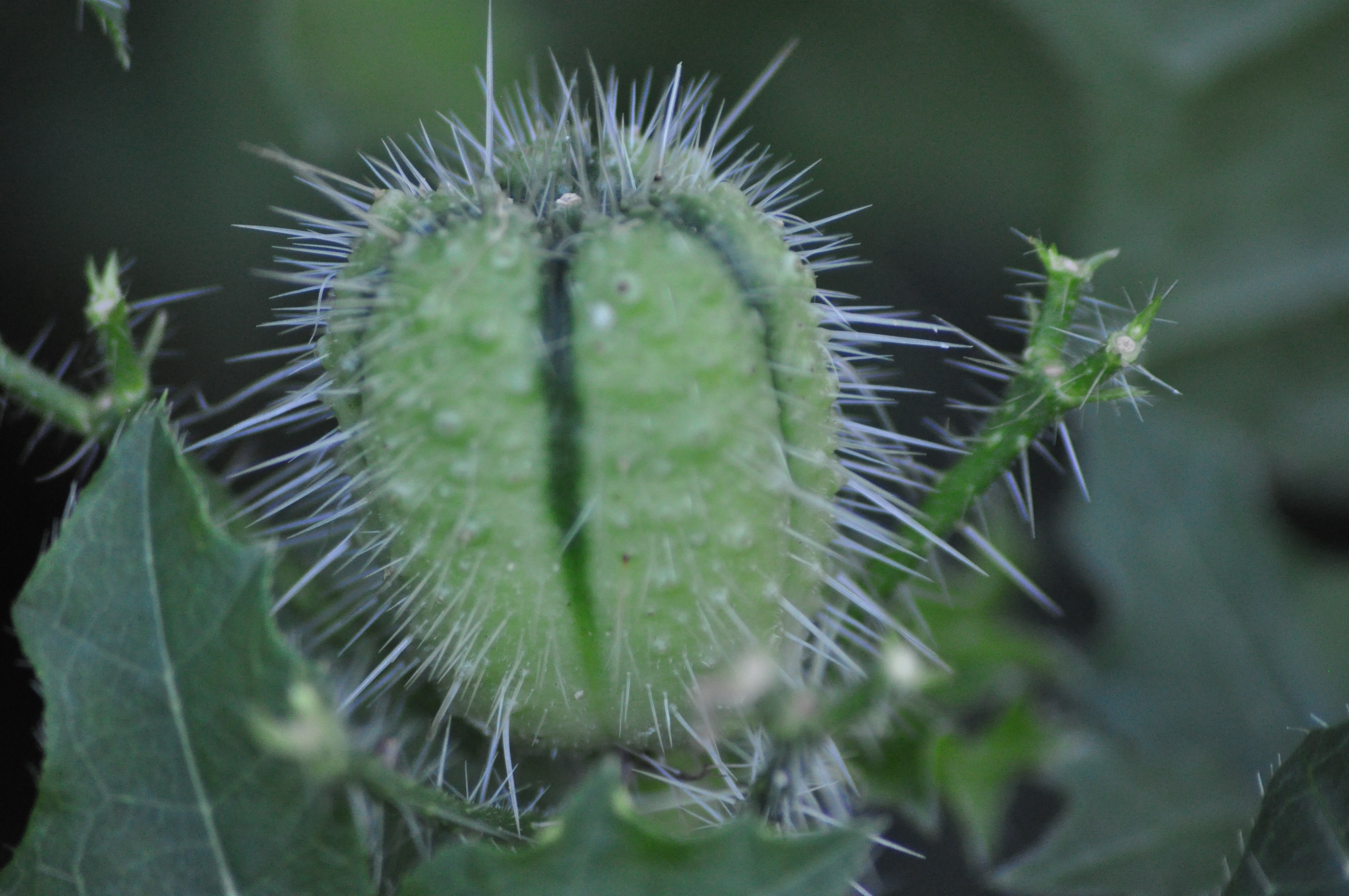

Conservation status
- Apparently Secure (NatureServe)

Scientific classification
- Kingdom: Plantae
- Clade: Tracheophytes
- Clade: Angiosperms
- Clade: Eudicots
- Clade: Rosids
- Order: Malpighiales
- Family: Euphorbiaceae
- Genus: Cnidoscolus
- Species: C. texanus

Binomial name
- Cnidoscolus texanus (Müll.Arg.) Small 1903

Synonyms
- Jatropha texana Müll.Arg. 1865; Bivonea texana (Müll. Arg.) House

= Cnidoscolus texanus =

Species of flowering plant

Cnidoscolus texanus, commonly known as Texas bullnettle (also Texas bull nettle and Texas bull-nettle), tread-softly, mala mujer, and finger rot, is a perennial herb covered with stinging hairs. The main stem, branches, leaves, and seed pods are all covered with hispid or glass-like bristly hairs that release an allergenic toxin upon contact. Contact with the plant results in intense pain: stinging, burning, and itching lasting for hours. It is native to the U.S. states of Texas, Arkansas, Kansas, Louisiana, and Oklahoma and also native to the northeastern state of Tamaulipas, Mexico. It is a herbaceous flowering plant that grows between 30–80 cm (11.8–31.5 in) tall and as much as 1 m (3.3 ft) across. Texas bullnettle (Cnidoscolus texanus) has showy, fragrant white flowers that can bloom throughout the year in southern regions of its distribution, predominantly March to November in northern regions. It is a drought-tolerant plant, therefore making it a superb choice for xeriscaping. This plant is attractive to birds, bees, butterflies, and other insects. The seeds are known to be consumed by Rio Grande wild turkeys (Meleagris gallopavo intermedia) and mourning doves (Zenaida macroura).

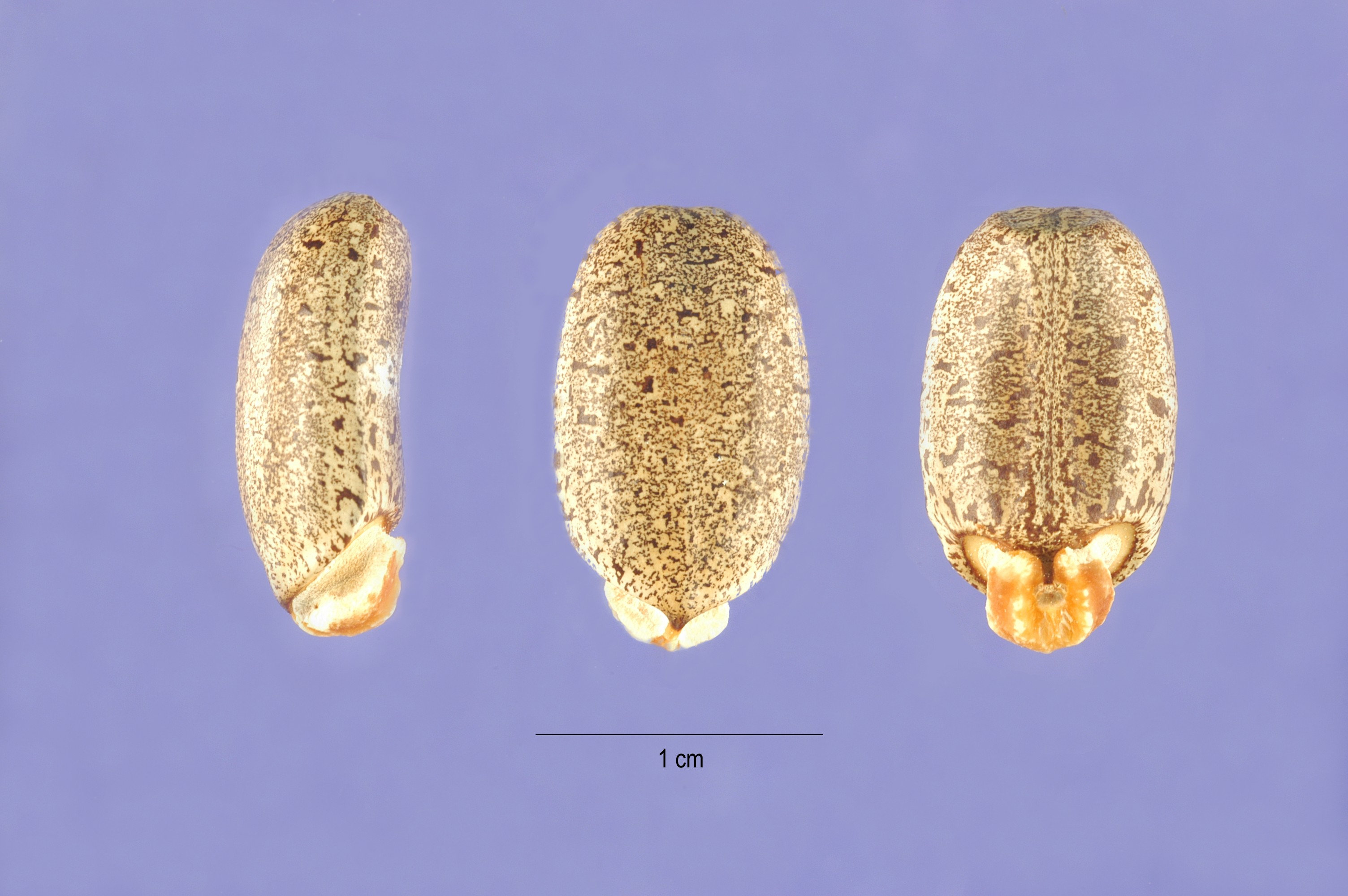
Seeds of Texas bullnettle (Cnidoscolus texanus)

The seeds, which are edible when ripe, are also consumed by humans. Indigenous Peoples harvested bullnettle seeds in the past, and some people still eat them today. Each seed pod contains three seeds, which are smooth, somewhat cylindrical, brownish white, and a half to three quarters of an inch long. When ripe, they are dispersed when the pod burst open, catapulting the seeds away from the plant. Great care and caution is advised in collecting the seeds. Tull suggested wearing long pants, long sleeves, boots, and gloves to pick the seed pods with a pair of tongs, then dropping them into a paper sack and waiting for the pods to ripen and burst in the sack to collect the seeds. They are said to be appetizing and tasty with a nutty flavor.

== Description ==
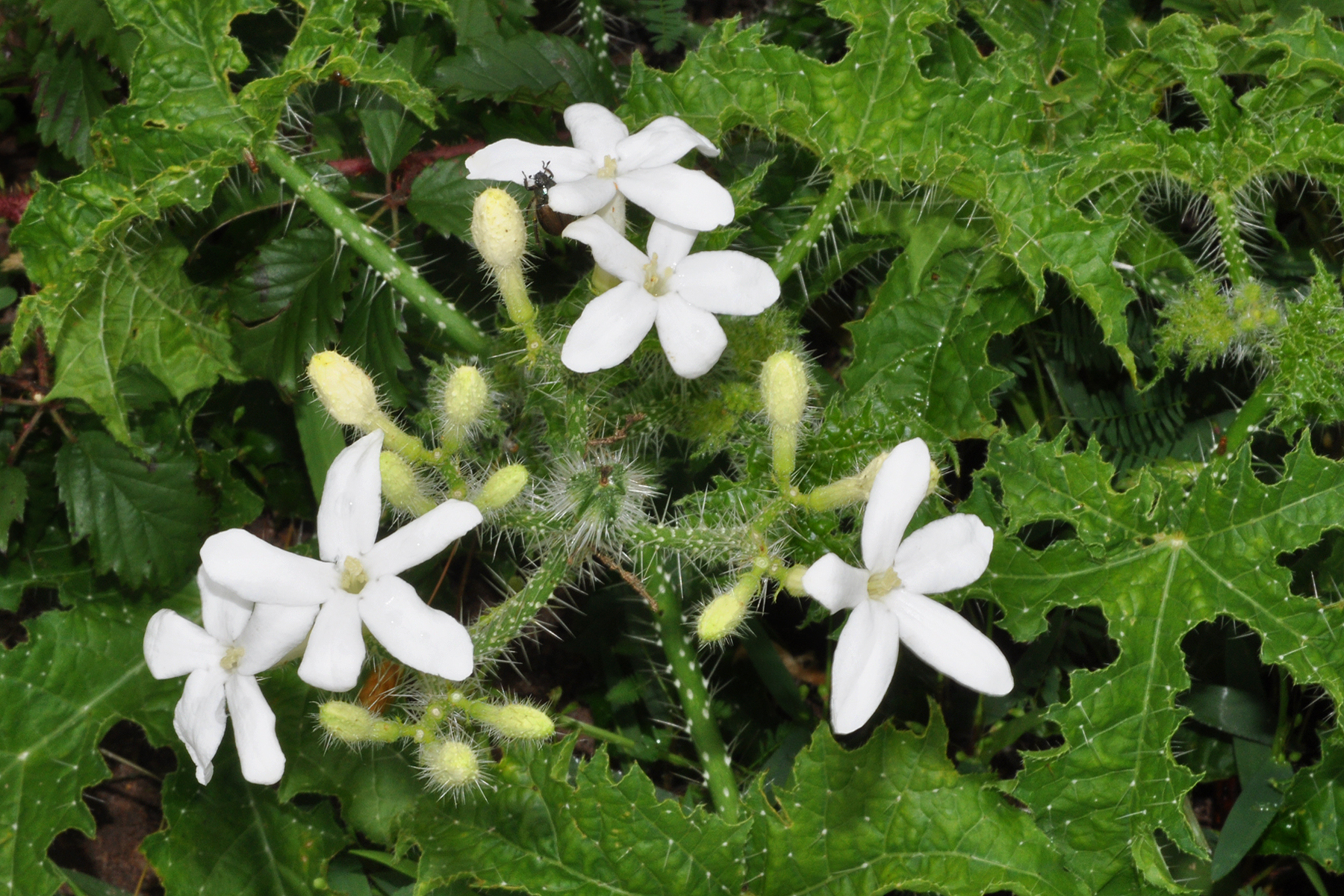
Texas bullnettle (Cnidoscolus texanus), Attwater Prairie Chicken National Wildlife Refuge, Colorado Co., TX, USA; 15 May 2013

It is a perennial plant with erect or sprawling branching stems growing from thick root stock, up to 40 inches (100 cm) long and 8 inches (20 cm) thick. It has milky latex and stiff prickly glandular-based, stinging hairs. The stems and leaves are green. The leaves are three to six inches (7.6 to 15.2 cm), simple, and are alternately arranged on the stem, and each leaf is deeply cut with 3 to 5 lobes. The lobes are typically roughly and irregularly toothed or lobed again. The flowers are in a few flowered terminal cymose inflorescences about one inch across. Flowers have five sepals and lack petals, the sepals are lobed, white, fragrant, and covered with hispid hairs. Each flower has 10 connate stamens. The male and female flowers separate but within the same cluster. The fruits are in prickly 3-seeded capsules.

It was first described by Johannes Müller Argoviensis in 1865 as Jatropha texana. It was then moved to the genus Cnidoscolus in 1903 by John Kunkel Small.

== Bullnettle exposure ==
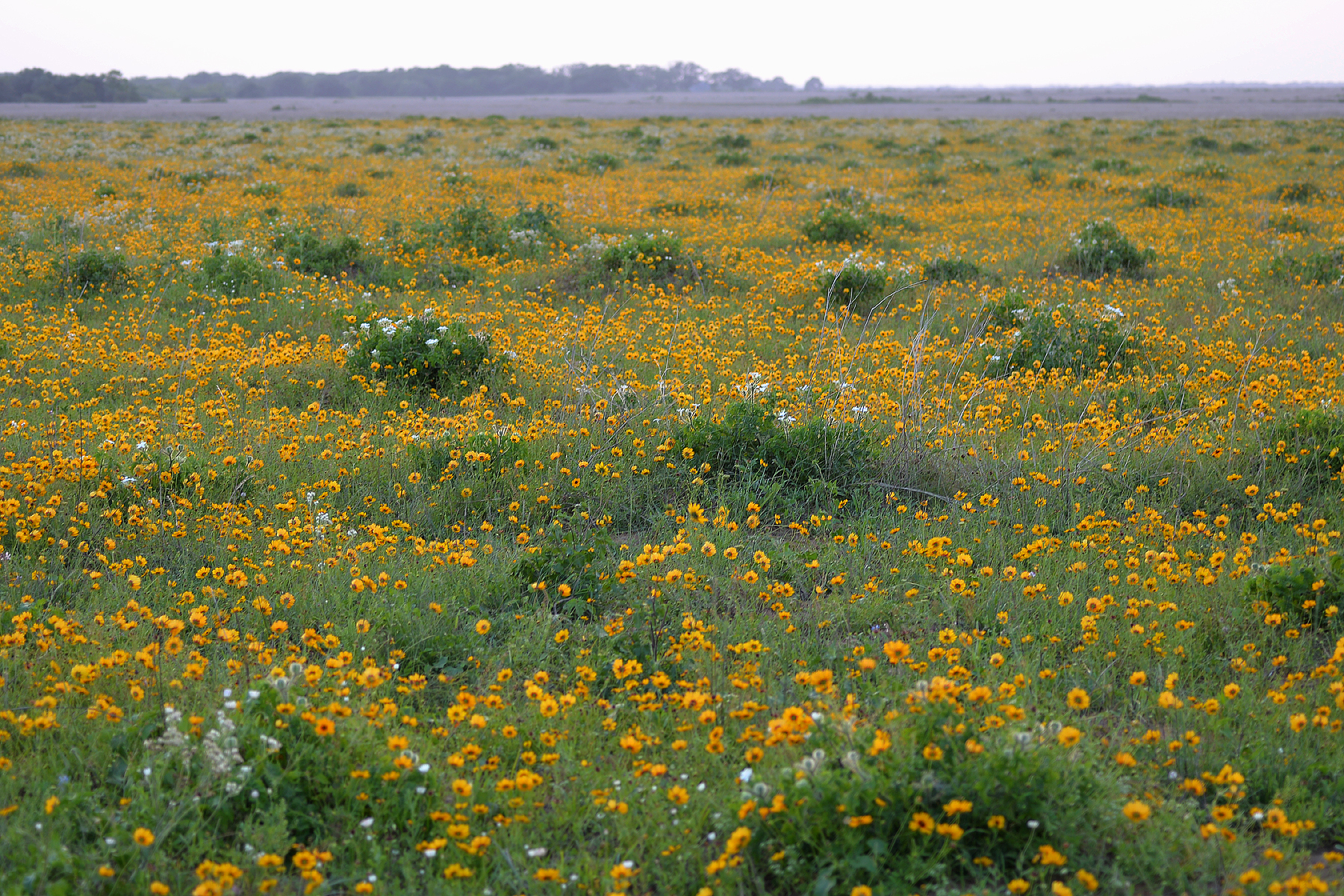
White flowers of the Texas bullnettle (Cnidoscolus texanus) blooming with the yellow plains coreopsis (Coreopsis tinctoria) in coastal prairie habitat, Attwater Prairie Chicken National Wildlife Refuge, Colorado Co., Texas, USA

Contact with the plant, even the inadvertent, gentle brushing of exposed skin in passing, results in intense pain, including a burning, stinging, itching rash lasting for hours, with the fine hairs breaking off in the skin secreting caustic irritants, which are highly acidic in pH. The spines providing a vehicle for the plant's secretions to make it into the dermal and epidermal layers of the skin. In a few extreme cases, people experience a severe reaction that may require treatment, ranging from cellulitis (a type of skin infection) to rare allergic reactions. Some authors suggest relief from a normal reaction can be found with the application of a weak solution of ammonia, "Windex is a good choice" or when in remote areas that urine can be applied, stating "desperate times call for desperate measures". Despite treatments involving removing the spines and then applying a basic substance are commonly suggested on the Internet, there is no published evidence that this is effective. Breaking the stem of the bullnettle also can be harmful, as it releases a milky sap which can cause an allergic reaction in those who are allergic to bullnettle spines.
