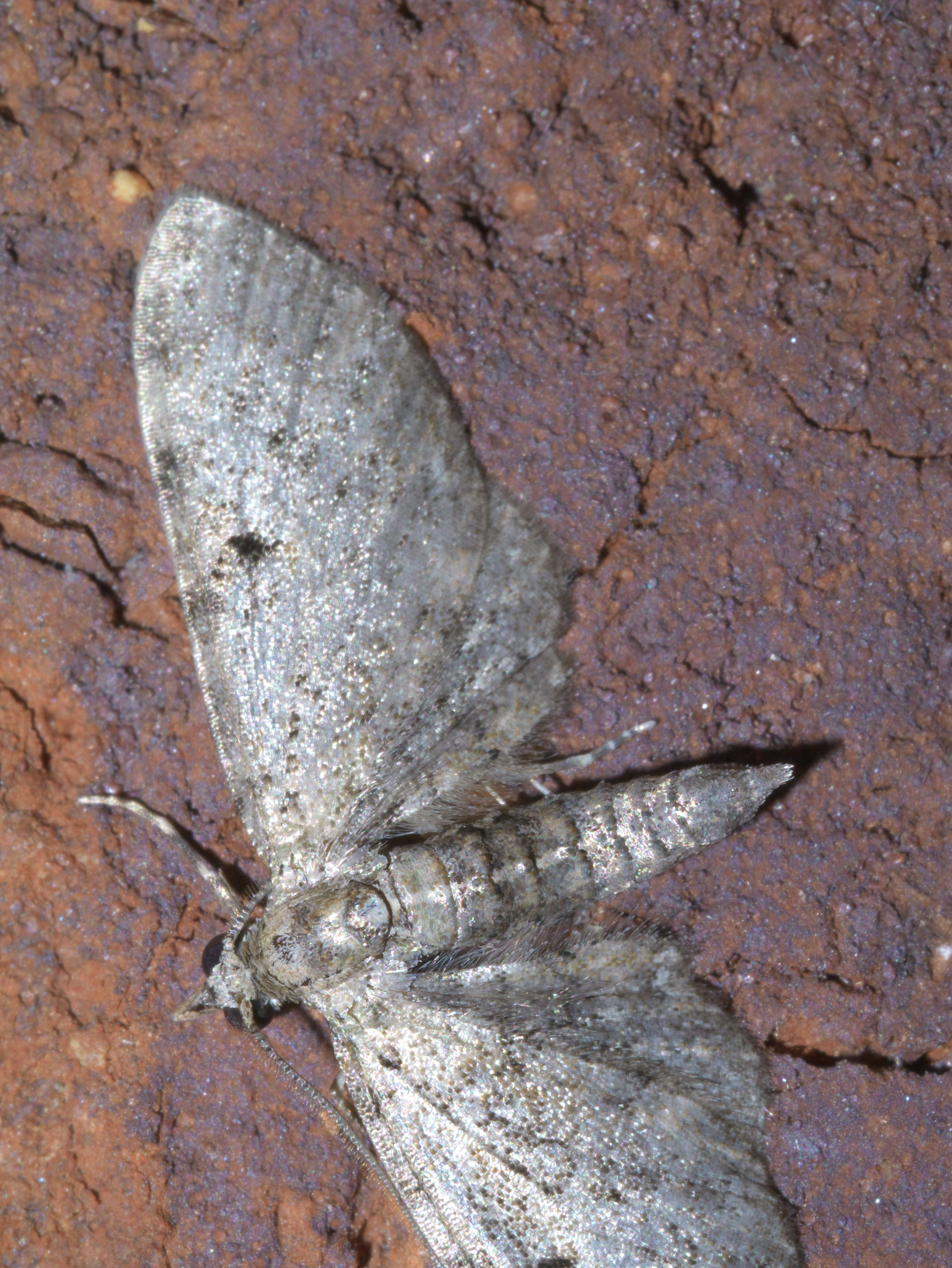
- Tornos scolopacinaria

Scientific classification
- Kingdom: Animalia
- Phylum: Arthropoda
- Class: Insecta
- Order: Lepidoptera
- Family: Geometridae
- Tribe: Boarmiini
- Genus: Tornos; Morrison, 1875

= Tornos (moth) =

Genus of moths

Tornos is a genus of geometrid moths in the family Geometridae erected by Morrison in 1875. There are about 17 described species in Tornos.

== Species ==
These 17 species belong to the genus Tornos:

- Tornos abjectarius Hulst, 1887^{i c g b}
- Tornos apiatus Rindge, 1954^{c g}
- Tornos benjamini Cassino & Swett, 1925^{i c g b}
- Tornos brutus Rindge, 1954^{c g}
- Tornos capitaneus Rindge, 1954^{c g}
- Tornos cinctarius Hulst, 1887^{i c g b}
- Tornos erectarius Grossbeck, 1909^{i c g b}
- Tornos hoffmanni Rindge, 1954^{i c g}
- Tornos mistus Rindge, 1954^{c g}
- Tornos penumbrosa Dyar, 1914^{c g}
- Tornos phoxus Rindge, 1954^{c g}
- Tornos punctata (Druce, 1899)^{i c g}
- Tornos pusillus Druce, 1898^{c g}
- Tornos quadripuncta Warren, 1897^{c g}
- Tornos scolopacinaria (Guenée in Boisduval & Guenée, 1858)^{i c g b} (dimorphic gray)
- Tornos spinosus Rindge, 1954^{c g}
- Tornos umbrosarius Dyar, 1910^{c g}

Data sources: i = ITIS, c = Catalogue of Life, g = GBIF, b = Bugguide.net
