= Tornos benjamini =

Scientific classification
- Domain: Eukaryota
- Kingdom: Animalia
- Phylum: Arthropoda
- Class: Insecta
- Order: Lepidoptera
- Family: Geometridae
- Tribe: Boarmiini
- Genus: Tornos
- Species: T. benjamini

Binomial name
- Tornos benjamini Cassino & Swett, 1925

Species of moth

Tornos benjamini is a species of geometrid moth in the family Geometridae. It is found in Central America and North America.

The MONA or Hodges number for Tornos benjamini is 6483.
