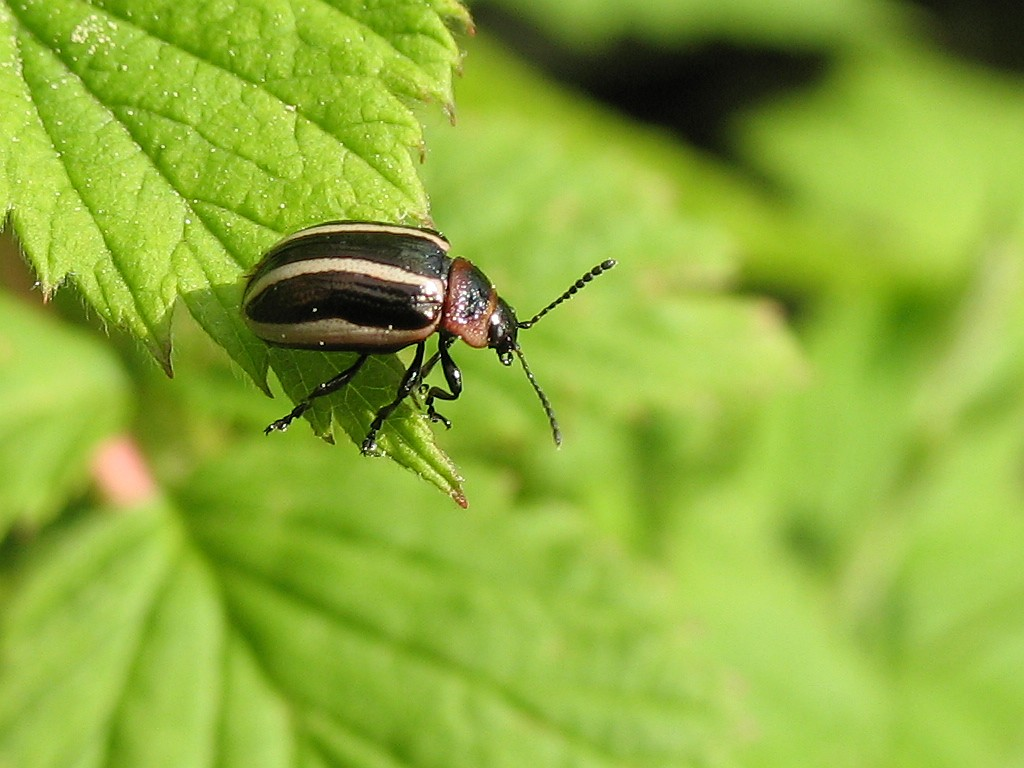
- Picture taken in Bas-Saint-Laurent, Québec, Canada in June 2006

Scientific classification
- Kingdom: Animalia
- Phylum: Arthropoda
- Clade: Pancrustacea
- Class: Insecta
- Order: Coleoptera
- Suborder: Polyphaga
- Infraorder: Cucujiformia
- Family: Chrysomelidae
- Genus: Calligrapha
- Species: C. californica

Binomial name
- Calligrapha californica (Linell, 1896)

Subspecies
- Calligrapha californica californica; Calligrapha californica coreopsivora Brown, 1945

Synonyms
- Calligrapha (Bidensomela) californica; Calligrapha coreopsivora; Calligrapha elegans (Olivier) Beaulne, 1939; Calligrapha elegans var. californica Linell, 1896; Chrysomela elegans Olivier, 1807, not Gmelin, 1789

= Calligrapha californica =

Species of beetle

Calligrapha californica is a species of beetles in the subfamily Chrysomelinae (a subfamily of leaf beetles or Chrysomelidae). It is found in the United States and Canada.
