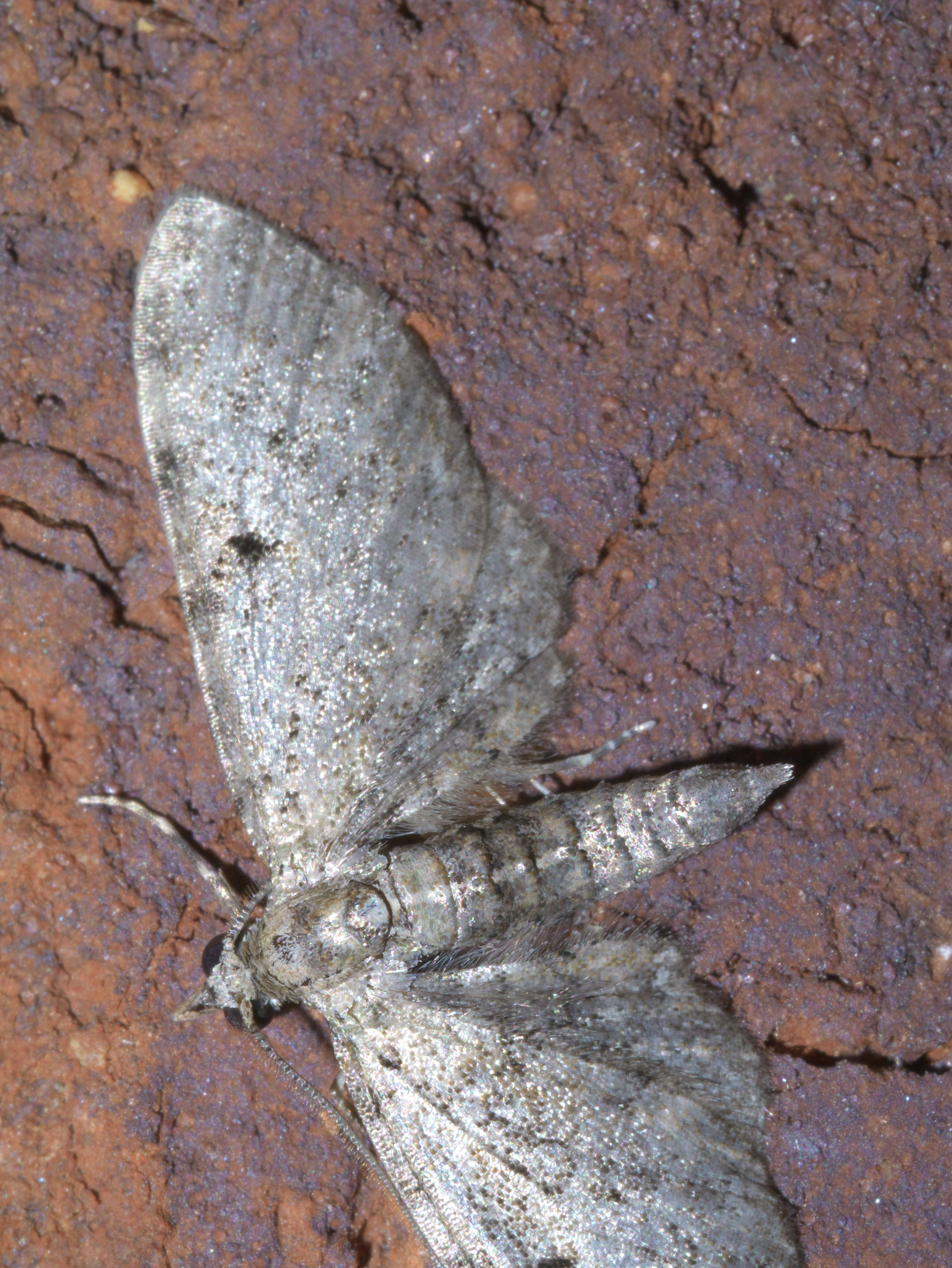

Scientific classification
- Kingdom: Animalia
- Phylum: Arthropoda
- Class: Insecta
- Order: Lepidoptera
- Family: Geometridae
- Tribe: Boarmiini
- Genus: Tornos
- Species: T. scolopacinaria

Binomial name
- Tornos scolopacinaria (Guenée in Boisduval & Guenée, 1858)

= Tornos scolopacinaria =

Species of moth

Tornos scolopacinaria, the dimorphic gray, is a species of geometrid moth in the family Geometridae. It is found in North America.

The MONA or Hodges number for Tornos scolopacinaria is 6486.

The male's wings are grayish-brown with a dark round discal spot on the fore wing. The female's wings are mainly yellowish-gray with dark gray outer margins. The female has a dark fore wing discal spot which is larger than the male's. Both sexes have a checkered fringe. The wingspan measures 2.1 to 2.9 cm. The moth flies from February to November.

The moths are known to use species of aster and tickseed plants as hosts.

== Subspecies ==
These three subspecies belong to the species Tornos scolopacinaria:

- Tornos scolopacinaria forsythae Rindge, 1954^{c g}
- Tornos scolopacinaria scolopacinaria^{g}
- Tornos scolopacinaria spodius Rindge, 1954^{c g}

Data sources: i = ITIS, c = Catalogue of Life, g = GBIF, b = Bugguide.net

== Gallery ==
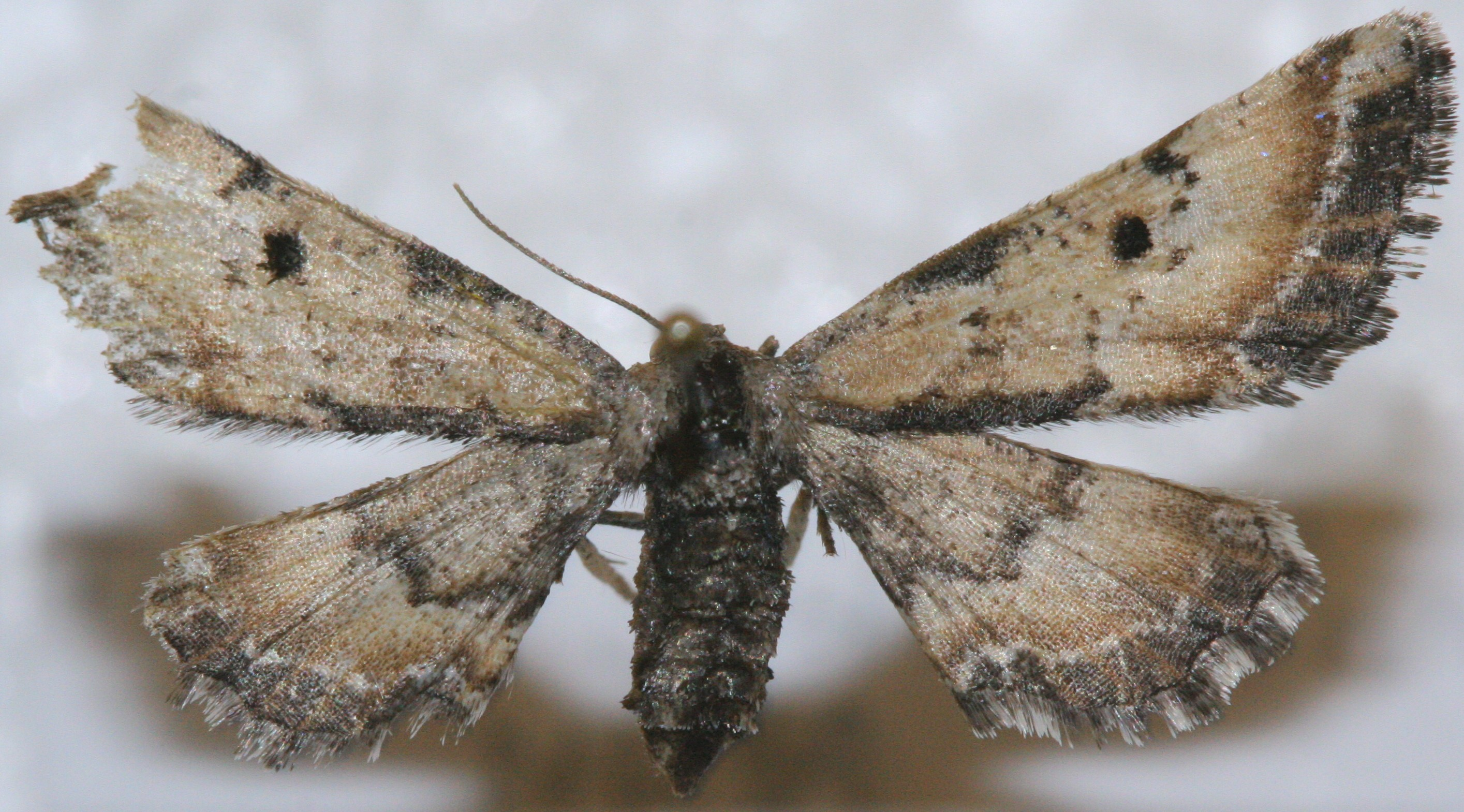
Female Tornos scolopacinarius

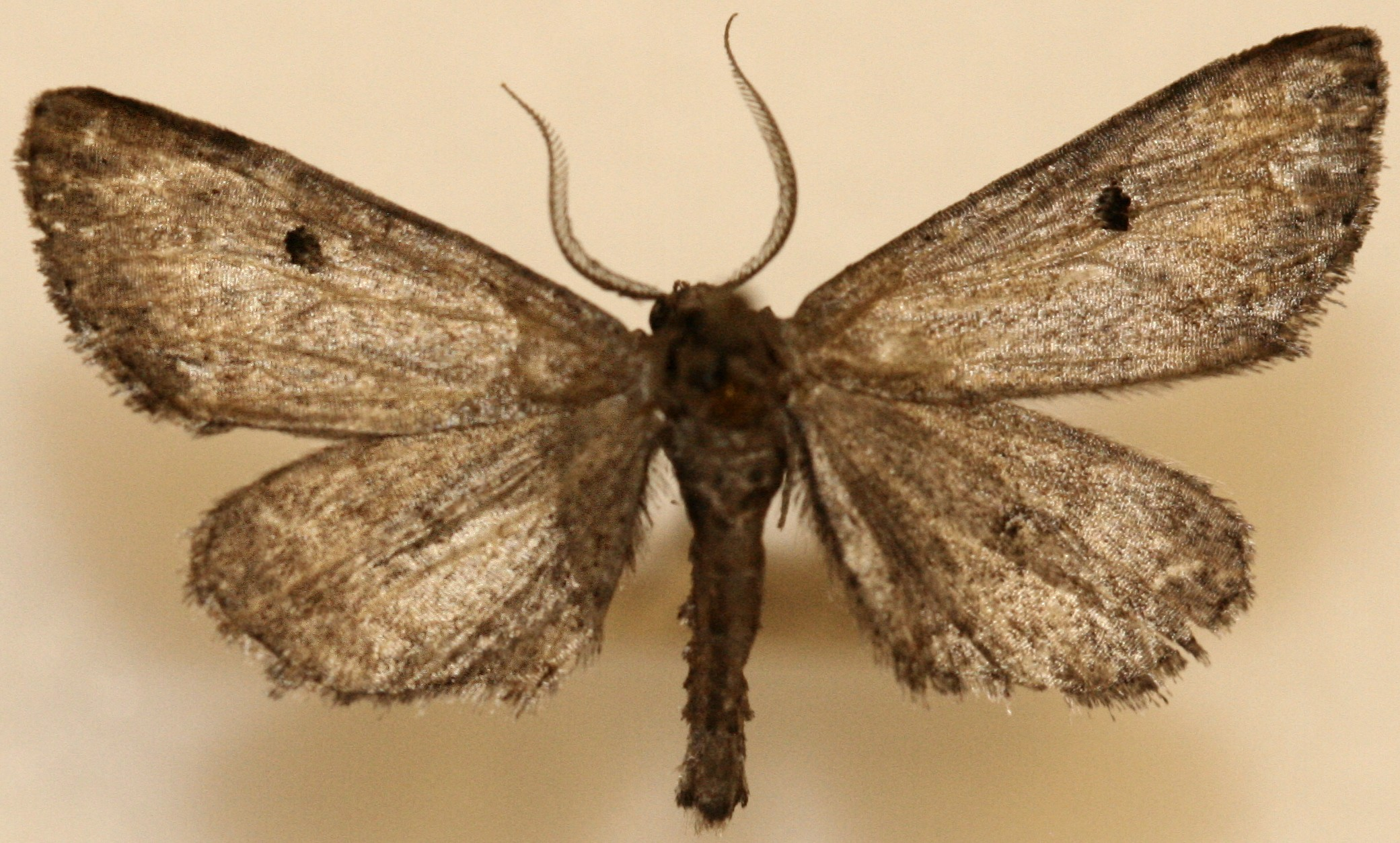
Male Tornos scolopacinarius
