= St. Mihiel American Cemetery and Memorial =

ABMC World War I cemetery in Lorraine, France

- France
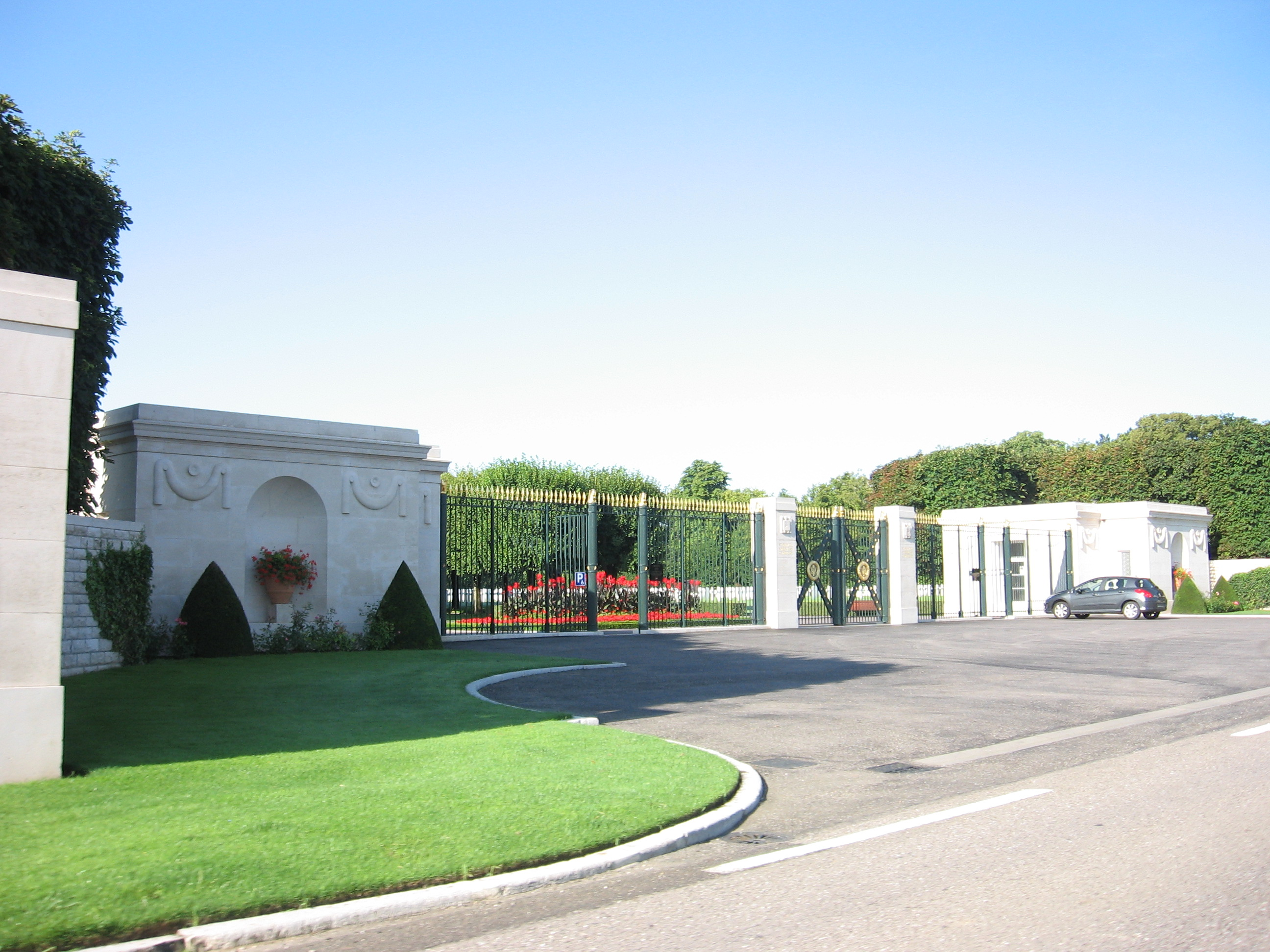
- Entrance Gate to the Saint Mihiel American Cemetery
- For World War I
- Location: 48°57′25″N 5°51′11″E

UNESCO World Heritage Site
- Official name: Funerary and memory sites of the First World War (Western Front)
- Type: Cultural
- Criteria: i, ii, vi
- Designated: 2023 (45th session)
- Reference no.: 1567-MM01

The St. Mihiel American Cemetery and Memorial is located at the west edge of Thiaucourt (Meurthe-et-Moselle), France. The 40.5 acres (16.4 ha) cemetery contains the graves of 4,153 American military dead from World War I. The majority of these died in the Battle of Saint-Mihiel, an offensive that resulted in the reduction of the St. Mihiel salient that threatened Paris. The American Battle Monuments Commission administers the cemetery.

== Cemetery design ==
In the late 1920s, the architect Thomas Harlan Ellett, in collaboration with the sculptor Paul Manship, designed the architectural features of the cemetery, including a memorial peristyle with fluted Doric columns, and flanking it, a chapel and a museum. The project was approved by the National Commission of Fine Arts by 1930, and completed in 1934.

The burial area is divided into four equal quadrants by paths lined with linden trees, at the center of which is a large sundial surmounted by an American eagle. A statue of a World War I soldier, sculpted by Paul Manship, stands at the end of the western axis, while a semi-circular overlook with a sculpted victory vase marks the end of the eastern axis.

== Memorial, chapel and museum ==
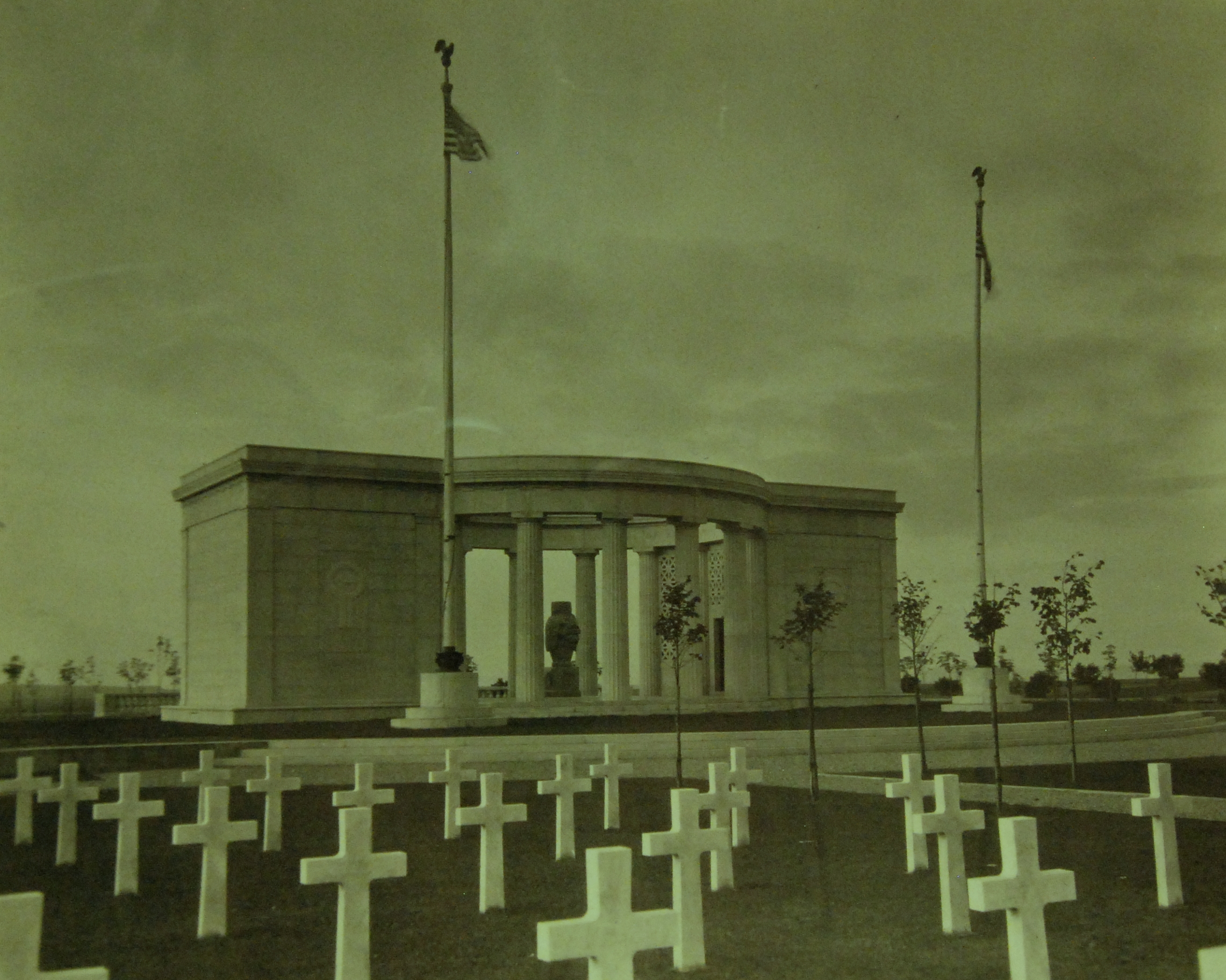
The memorial with peristyle in center and flanking chapel and museum, 1923

A large rose-granite urn sits at the center of the white marble peristyle, embellished with sculpted drapery and a winged horse symbolizing the flight of the immortal soul to the afterlife.

Inside the museum, an inlaid marble map created by the mosaic artist Barry Faulkner depicts the St. Mihiel offensive. The surrounding walls are inscribed with the names of 284 missing soldiers, with rosettes to mark the names of those whose remains were later recovered and identified.

The chapel's floor is inlaid with green marble, and its coffered ceiling decorated with gilt Napoleonic bees. Above an ivory-tinted altar, a mosaic depicts St. Michael the Archangel, sheathing his sword, flanked by a pair of doves of peace holding olive twigs. Mosaic shields display the colors of the United States and France.

== Notable burials ==
- Lt. Col. Gilbert C. Grafton (1860–1919), U.S. Army officer, North Dakota National Guard major, and namesake of Camp Grafton
- 2 Lieut. John Hunter Wickersham (1890–1918 †), recipient of the Medal of Honor for action in the St. Mihiel offensive

== Gallery ==
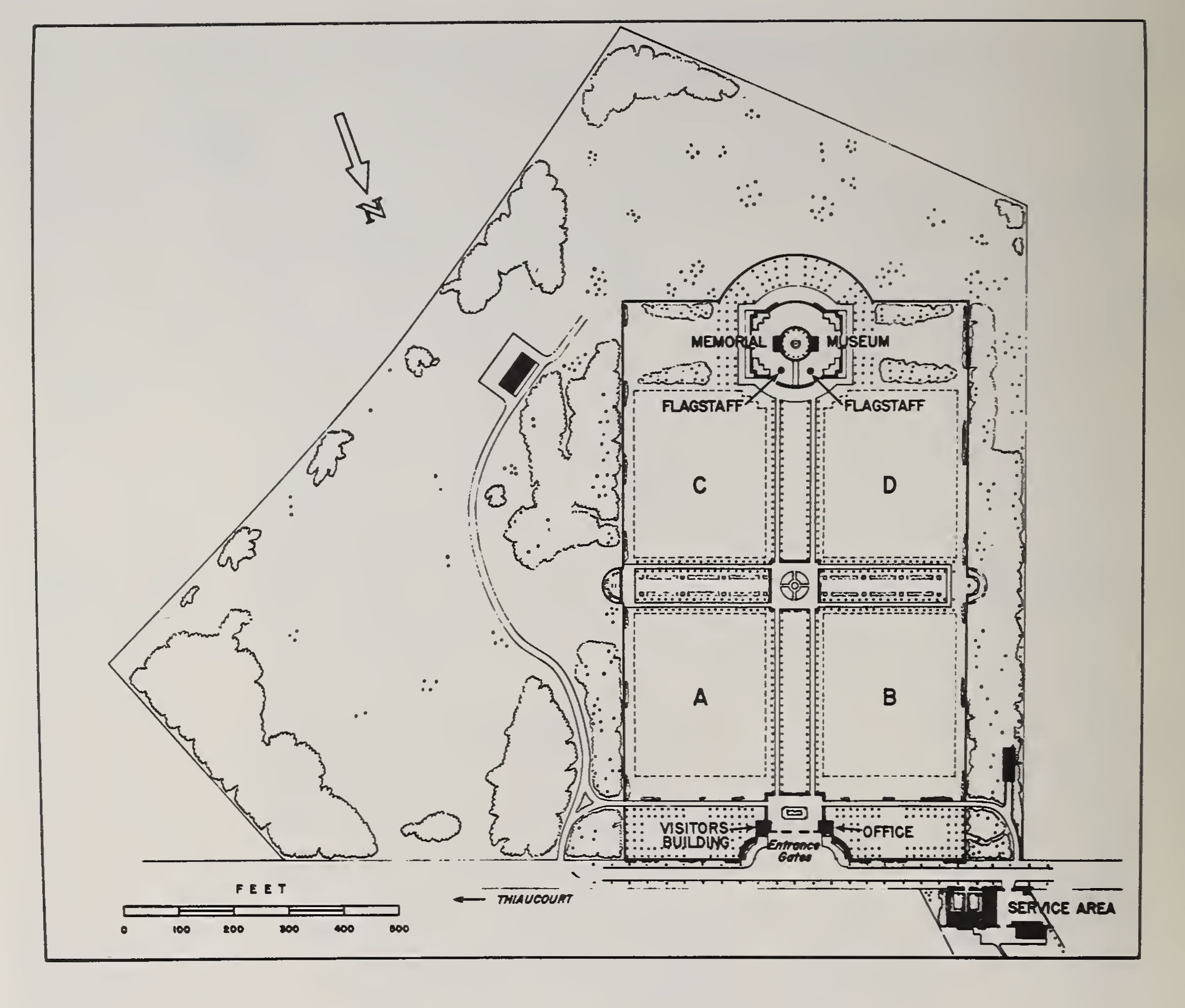
Site Plan of Saint Mihiel American Cemetery, Thiaucourt, France, completed 1934.

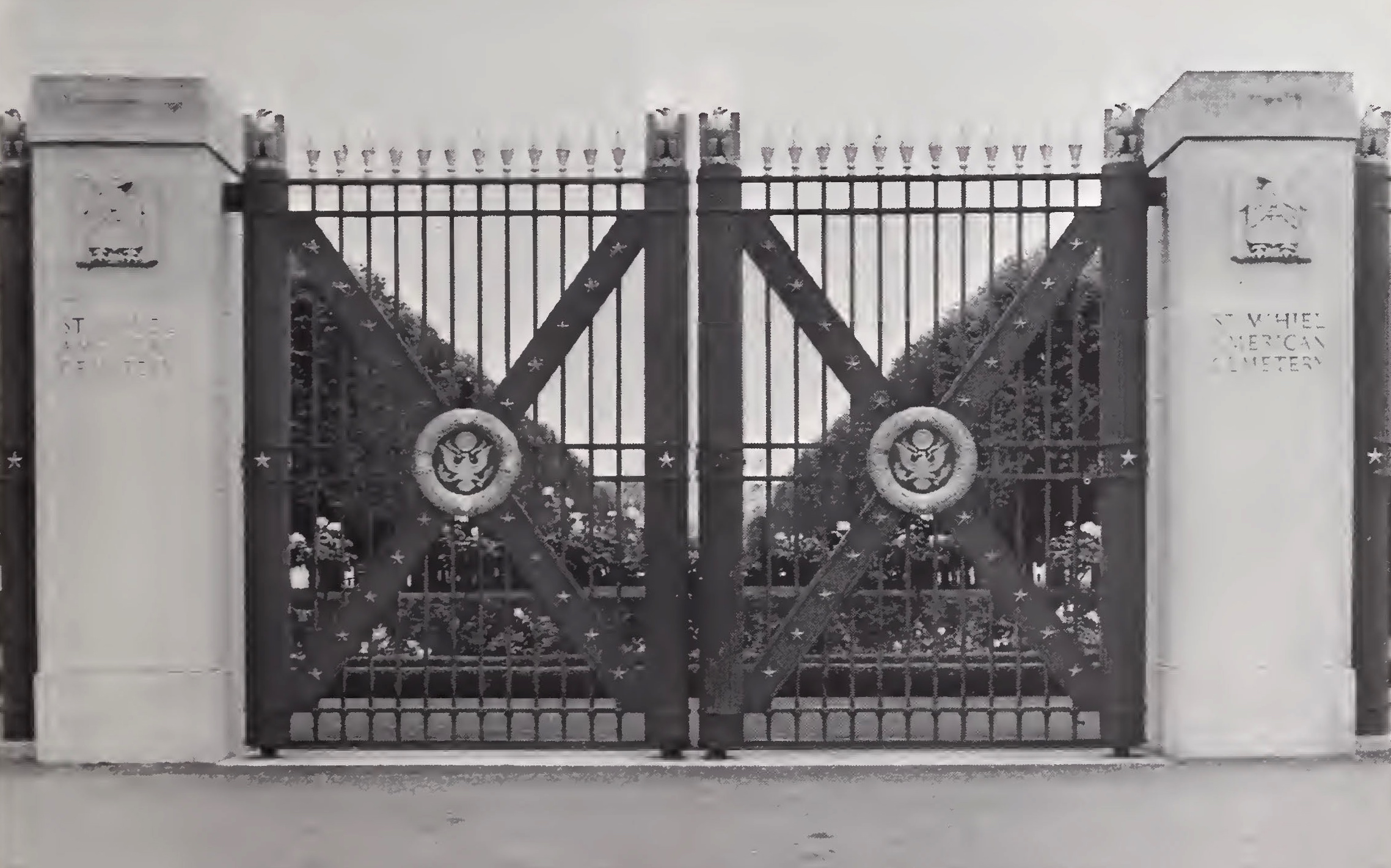
Entrance Gate to the Saint Mihiel American Cemetery, Thiaucourt, France, completed 1934.

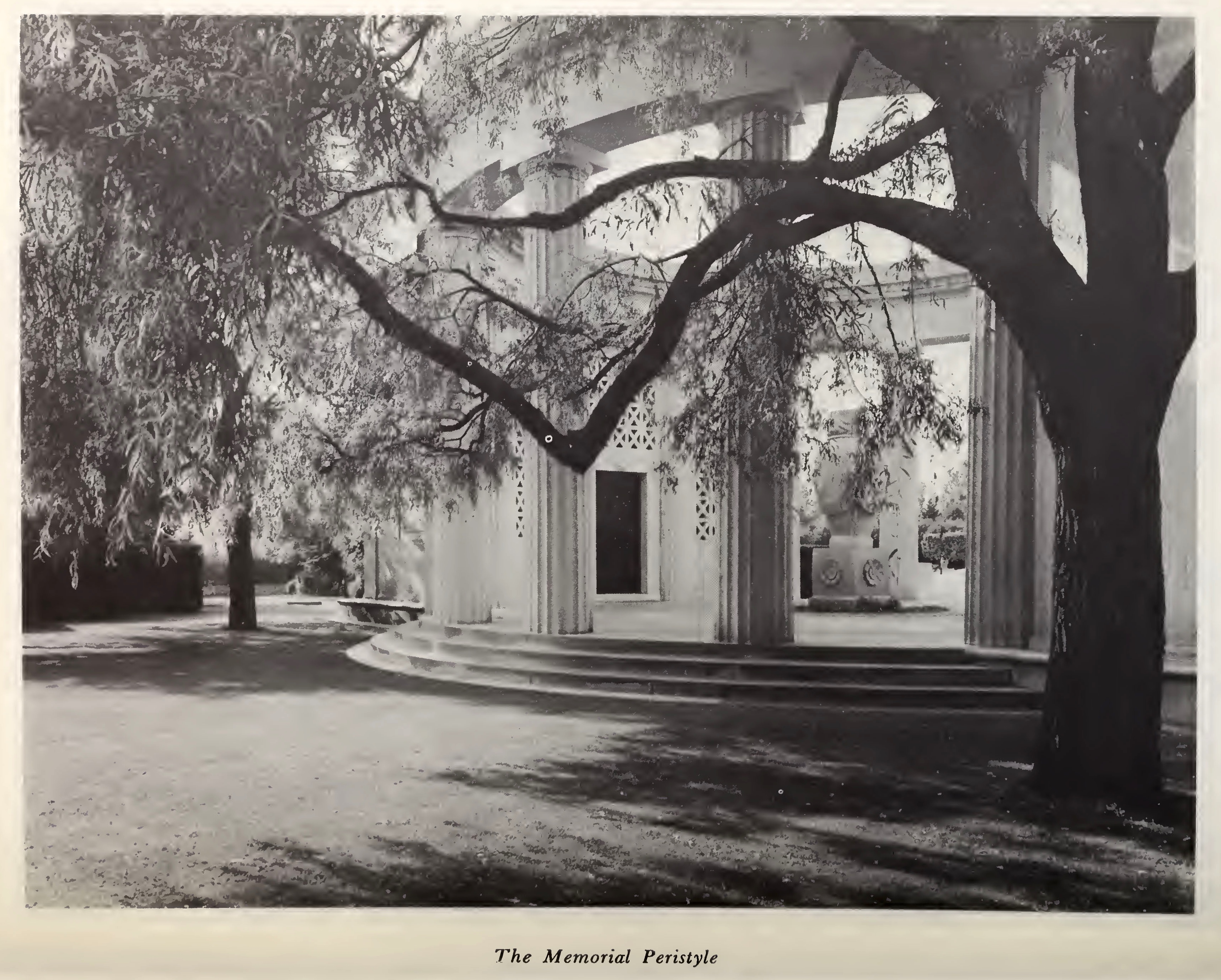
Peristyle at the Saint Mihiel American Cemetery, Thiaucourt, France, completed 1934.

== See also ==
- World War I memorials
