= Gilbert C. Grafton =

United States Army Lieutenant Colonel (1860–1919)

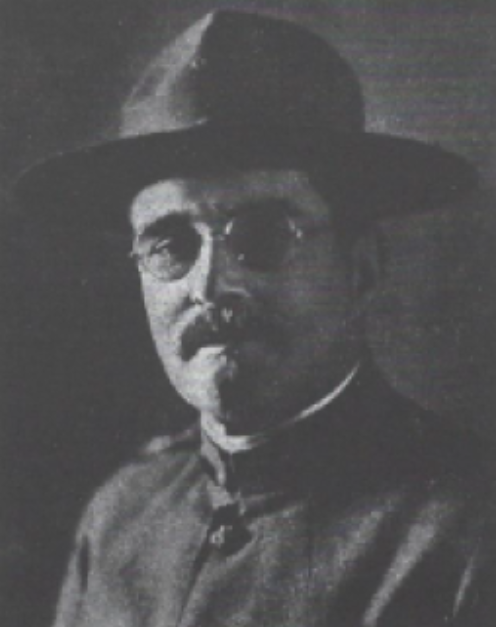
- U.S. Army portrait of Grafton c. 1910s
- Born: October 6, 1860; Bowden, England, U.K.
- Died: February 5, 1919 (aged 58) Camp Hospital No. 24, France
- Buried: St. Mihiel American Cemetery and Memorial
- Allegiance: United States
- Branch: United States Army
- Service years: 1885–1919
- Rank: Lieutenant Colonel
- Conflicts: Spanish–American War; World War I
- Awards: World War I Victory Medal

Gilbert Collins Grafton (October 6, 1860 – February 5, 1919) was a United States Army Lieutenant Colonel and Major in the North Dakota National Guard since its territorial days. Since 1924, he has been the namesake of Camp Grafton.

== Early life and career ==
Grafton was born in Bowden, England on October 6, 1860. He emigrated to America and became a Naturalized Citizen. In his early career, Grafton worked for the U.S. postal service. He remained a lifetime member of the National Association of Letter Carriers.

== Military service ==
In 1885 at the age of 25, Grafton enlisted in Company B, 1st Infantry of the North Dakota National Guard. He attained the rank of Sergeant by 1887, and 1st Sergeant in 1888. In 1890, Grafton petitioned the North Dakota legislature to provide the National Guard with additional supplies, armaments, and provisions to aid in their efforts to suppress American Indians in the region.

In 1892, he was commissioned as a Captain and later led the company during the Spanish–American War beginning in April 1898. He later attained the ranks of Regimental Sergeant Major by 1899 and Major by 1911.

Grafton was commissioned as a Lieutenant Colonel in 1911. In 1915, he was stationed at the Mobilization Camp in San Antonio and was attached to the 28th U.S. Infantry as an instructor.

=== Federal service ===
In June 1916, he was called into federal service as a Lieutenant Colonel to help lead Mexican border duty efforts. Grafton was noted for maintaining a strict training regimen for the troops under his supervision.

He was first discharged from federal service in 1917 at Fort Snelling, and resumed his status in the North Dakota National Guard. Grafton was offered the appointment of Adjutant General of North Dakota by Governor L. B. Hanna upon his return, which he declined.

In 1917, he was again called into federal service during World War I. He was assigned as overseas personnel of the Army Service School.

== Death ==
Grafton died of disease at Camp Hospital No. 24 in France on February 5, 1919, aged 58. He is interred at St. Mihiel American Cemetery and Memorial in France. After his death, the National Association of Letter Carriers issued a resolution honoring his life and service.

== Awards and honors ==
In 1924, Camp Grafton was unofficially named in his honor. The naming was made permanent by executive order of Governor Norman Brunsdale in 1952. Grafton is also the namesake of the "North Dakota American Legion Gilbert C. Grafton Post 2," established in 1919.

Grafton's name is included on the Veterans Memorial at the North Dakota State Capitol and the Military Hall of Honor. He is designated as a 'State Hero' by the North Dakota Department of Veterans Affairs.
