= North Dakota School for the Deaf =

Coordinates: 48°07′23″N 98°52′03″W

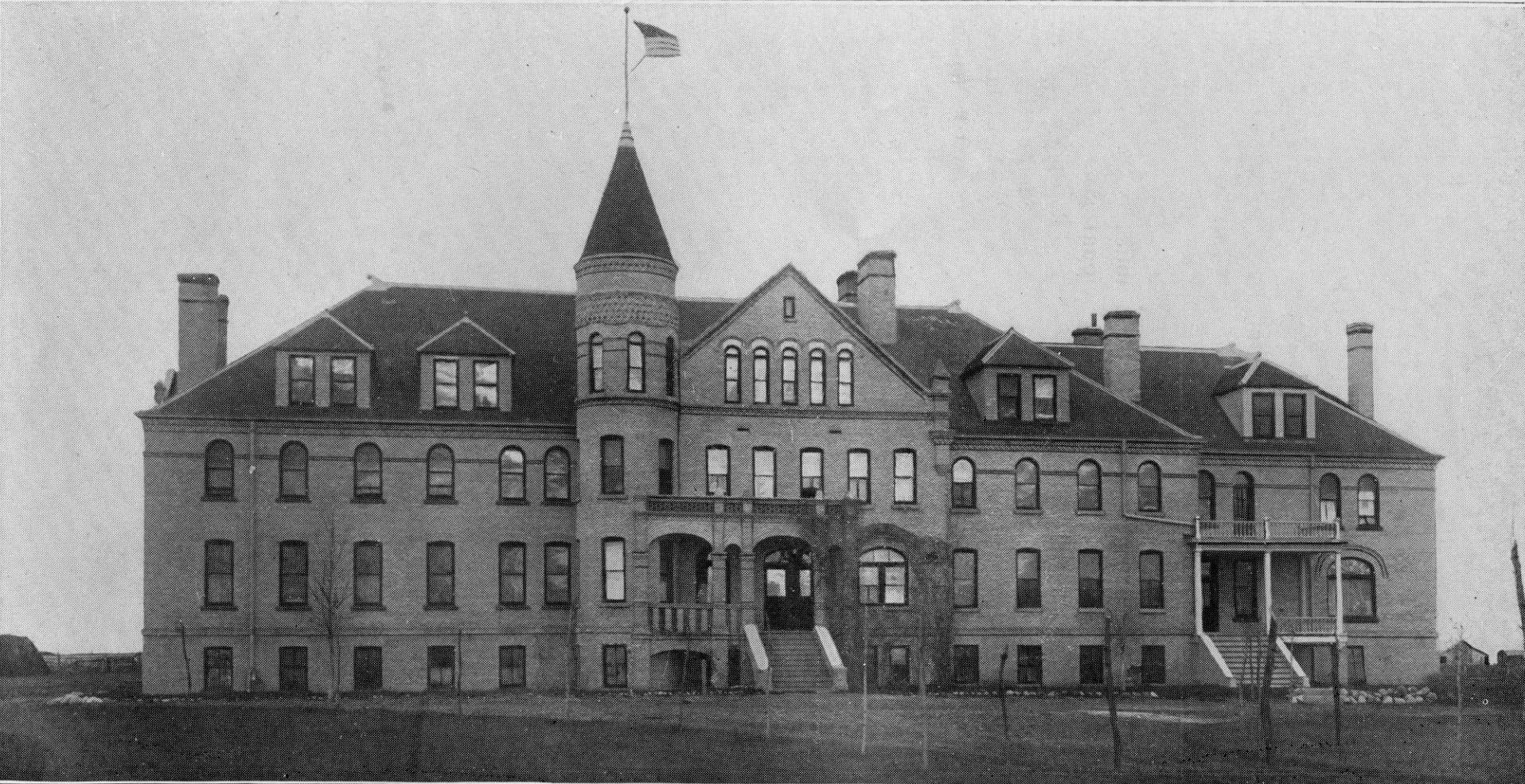
- North Dakota School for the Deaf's main building, Devils Lake, North Dakota, circa 1910s
- Devils Lake, North Dakota

Information
- Type: Public
- Motto: Looking Back with Pride, Looking Forward with Confidence
- Established: March 15, 1890
- Head of school: Donna E. Sorensen
- Staff: 49
- Grades: Pre-K to 8th Serves as a dormitory for 9–12, which are sent to Devils Lake High School; Prior to fall 2012: K–12
- Enrollment: 12 (2023-'24)
- Colors: Green and White
- Mascot: Bulldogs
- Website: www.ndsd.nd.gov

The North Dakota School for the Deaf (NDSD) is a state-funded residential school located in Devils Lake, North Dakota, that provides services to meet the educational needs of children who are deaf and hard of hearing. NDSD is under the direction, control, and management of the North Dakota Department of Public Instruction. The current superintendent of the school is Donna Sorensen.

== History ==
Before the Dakota Territory was divided, deaf children living in the part of the territory now known as North Dakota had to do without an education or attend the school in Sioux Falls, South Dakota. Because of poor roads, great distances, meager railroads, and general financial inability, few of the North Dakota children could attend the South Dakota School for the Deaf. In the fall of 1889 Anson R. Spear, a deaf man from Minneapolis, Minnesota, came to North Dakota to establish a school for the deaf. Mr. Spear's political backers, Senator Swanston and Representative McCormick, introduced a bill in the Legislature for the immediate establishment for the proposed school in Devils Lake. The bill passed March 15, 1890, over the veto of Governor John Miller.

The citizens of Devils Lake furnished free for two years a wooden building located at the corner of Third Avenue and Fifth Street. Mr. Spear was appointed superintendent on August 1, 1890, and the first term began September 10, 1890. The first student to be enrolled was 10-year-old Mabel Alice Newton. By the end of the first school year, 23 children were enrolled. The combined method of communication—use of signs, hand alphabet, and oral method—was used to teach the students. In January 1891, money was appropriated by the State Legislature for a permanent building.

The Great Northern Railway donated an 18-acre (73,000 m^{2}) tract of land one mile (1.6 km) north of the heart of Devils Lake for the permanent site of NDSD, and construction of the first building "Old Main" began on May 30, 1892. "Old Main" was designed by Olof Hanson, a rising Deaf architect from Faribault, Minnesota.

The school previously had an in-house high school. In the late 1930s it had 140 students, its peak enrollment. The Individuals with Disabilities Education Act (IDEA), first passed in the 1970s, started a trend of deaf students enrolling at local public schools as well as in specialized programs in the larger towns around the state. The average enrollment in the 1980s was 97 students. By the 1990s the average enrollment was down to 48. The last graduating class was in 2004, and in 2012 it ended direct high school operations. In 2019 the school had 18 students.

== Campus ==
It includes dormitory facilities. The Blackhurst Dormitory and the cafeteria serve the students.

== Operations ==
NDSD directly teaches grades K–8 while it sends students in grades 9–12 to Devils Lake High School, operated by Devils Lake Public Schools.

== Athletics ==
In the past, NDSD fielded teams in baseball, football, basketball, track and field, etc. Back then, the school had a large enough student population to have enough athletes to compete with various small towns in the area. Due to the reduction in the number of students through mainstream school placement, the school entered into co-op athletic agreements with a couple towns—one was with Crary, although the school now has a co-op agreement with the Devils Lake public schools. In the past, the nickname for the school's teams has always been the Bulldogs; the school's team colors have also always been green and white.

- Boys' Sports
  - Football (with Devils Lake High School)
  - Basketball (began in 1914)
  - Track
- Girls' Sports
  - Basketball
  - Track

== Newsletter ==
The Banner, the official newsletter of NDSD, was first published in 1891. Clara Halvorson, the first teacher employed at the school, is credited with naming the Banner. The purpose of the newsletter was to keep parents informed on what happened at the school, publish pupils' school work, and to provide publishing experience to students. The Banner is still published today.

== Superintendents ==
Past Superintendents of the North Dakota School for the Deaf include:

- Anson R. Spear (1890–1985)
- Dwight F. Bangs (1895–1912)
- J. W. Blattner (1912–1915)
- Frank Read (1915–1920)
- M. C. McClure (1920–1921)
- Burton W. Driggs (1921–1937)
- Arthur P. Buchanan (1937–1945)
- Carl F. Smith (1945–1969)
- Allen J. Hayek (1969–1981)
- Dr. Gary L. Holman (1982–1986)
- Alan J. Mealka (1986–1990)
- Jaime D. Galloway (1990–1998)
- Rocklyn Cofer (1998–2005)
- Dennis J. Fogelson (2006–2009)
- Carmen Grove Suminski (2009–2013)
- Dr. Connie Hovendick (August 2014 to June 2022)
- Donna E. Sorensen (September 2022 to present)

== Enrollments ==
- average number of pupils 28 in 1890–1985
- average number of pupils 66 in 1895–1912
- average number of pupils 111 in 1912–1915
- average number of pupils 118 in 1915–1920
- average number of pupils 120 in 1920–1921
- average number of pupils 123 in 1921–1937 (140 pupils in 1937 to 1939 for peak)
- average number of pupils 119 in 1937–1945
- average number of pupils 89 in 1945–1969
- average number of pupils 101 in 1969–1981
- average number of pupils 67 in 1982–1986
- average number of pupils 48 in 1986–1990
- average number of pupils 55 in 1990–1998
- average number of pupils 36 in 1998–2005
- average number of pupils 26 in 2006–2009
- average number of pupils 23 in 2009–2013
- average number of pupils 17 in 2014–2022
- average number of pupils 12 in 2022–present

== Notable alumni / past students ==
- John L. Clarke – wood carver
- Phyllis Frelich – actress
- Michael J. Olson – archivist and actor
