= Heber M. Creel =

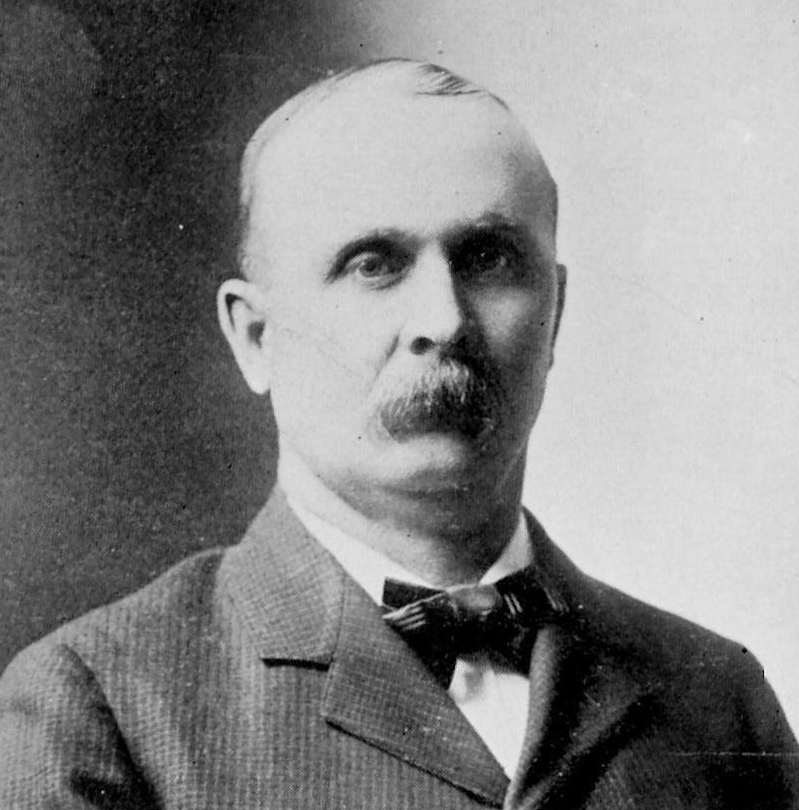

5th Adjutant General of North Dakota
- In office 1905–1907
- Preceded by: Elliot S. Miller
- Succeeded by: Thomas H. Poole

Personal details
- Born: Missouri
- Died: San Diego, California
- Spouse: Alice LaRue
- Education: United States Military Academy

Military service
- Branch/service: United States Army

Heber Mansfield Creel was an American soldier, surveyor, politician, and newspaper publisher. He served as Adjutant General of North Dakota from 1905 to 1907.

Creel was born in Missouri in the 1850s. Some sources indicate he was born in 1851 and others claim 1855.

Creel later attended West Point in 1873 and graduated in 1877 as second lieutenant in 8th U.S. Cavalry. Shortly afterward, he was promoted and transferred to the 7th Cavalry. Over the next few years, he was stationed at several different military forts, most of them being in Dakota Territory (eventually North Dakota). He was stationed at Fort Abraham Lincoln, Fort Rice, Fort Buford, and Fort Totten. While there, he created detailed maps of the shores of Devils Lake and the reservation (Spirit Lake).

In 1882, Creel resigned his commission and surveyed a townsite. He named it Creelsburg (or Creelsburgh). In 1883, the town's name was changed to Creel City. A year later when the town was incorporated, and after the railroad had arrived, the name was changed again to Devils Lake.

Creel became a prominent citizen of the town he had established. He served as postmaster and owned a local newspaper, the Devils Lake Pioneer Press. Creel ran for mayor in 1885, but he was defeated by his rival Henry C. Hansbrough.

In 1891, Creel was promoted to a colonel in the North Dakota National Guard. Creel was appointed Adjutant General of North Dakota by Governor Elmore Sarles, and he served in this role from 1905 to 1907. At the time of his retirement, Creel was a brigadier general in the North Dakota National Guard.

Heber M. Creel died in 1932 in San Diego, California.

== See also ==
- Adjutant General of North Dakota
- Devils Lake, North Dakota
