= Caravan (magazine) =

Monthly magazine published in the UK

- Editor: Victoria Bentley
- Staff writers: Mike Cazalet
- Categories: Caravanning
- Frequency: Monthly
- Publisher: Warners Group
- Founder: F L M Harris
- First issue: May 1933
- Country: UK
- Language: English

Caravan magazine is a UK monthly consumer magazine for the touring caravan community.

It was Britain's first caravanning magazine, offering advice and tips on every aspect of the hobby. Every month the magazine features touring and travel articles for the UK and Europe, new gadgets and products with the Caravan Lottery giveaway, show and event news, reviews, and feedback with reader content. Written by caravanners for caravanners, the magazine publishes advice on owning a caravan, from buying a tow car to choosing the right towing mirrors, awnings, gas bottles, and barbecues.

== History ==
Caravan magazine, originally called The Caravan and Trailer, was founded in 1933 by F L M Harris and produced from offices in Colney Heath near St. Albans. It was the Caravan Club's official magazine in the 1930s, and by 1940, Caravan magazine, The National Caravan Council and the Caravan Club all shared the same large house in Purley, South London.

By 1963, the first issue of En Route, the Caravan Club's own magazine, had been published and Caravan magazine, now part of Link House Magazines, moved to new premises in Croydon. In the late 1990s, IPC Media took over Link House Magazines, and the IPC Inspire division of IPC Media began publication of Caravan.

The magazine underwent a redesign in June 2006 and as a result, increased its year-on-year circulation in 2007 by 15.5%, making it the fastest growing magazine in its division.

Editor Victoria Bentley was the first woman to edit the title in its 75-year history.

Warners Group Publishing bought "Caravan" magazine from IPC Media in 2010 to join its portfolio of outdoor leisure magazines such as MMM, Which Motorhome, and Camping magazine.

The editorial team includes:

- Managing editor: John Sootheran
- Digital editor: Will Hawkins
- Associate editor: Val Chapman

Contributors and industry experts appearing in the magazine have included Mike Cazalet, Mark Sutcliffe, Andrew Ditton, John Chapman, Lindsay Porter, John Wickersham, Nick Harding, Natalie Cumming and Stuart Craig.

== See also ==
- Caravan and Motorhome Club
