= Creel Township, Ramsey County, North Dakota =

Creel Township, North Dakota
- Township
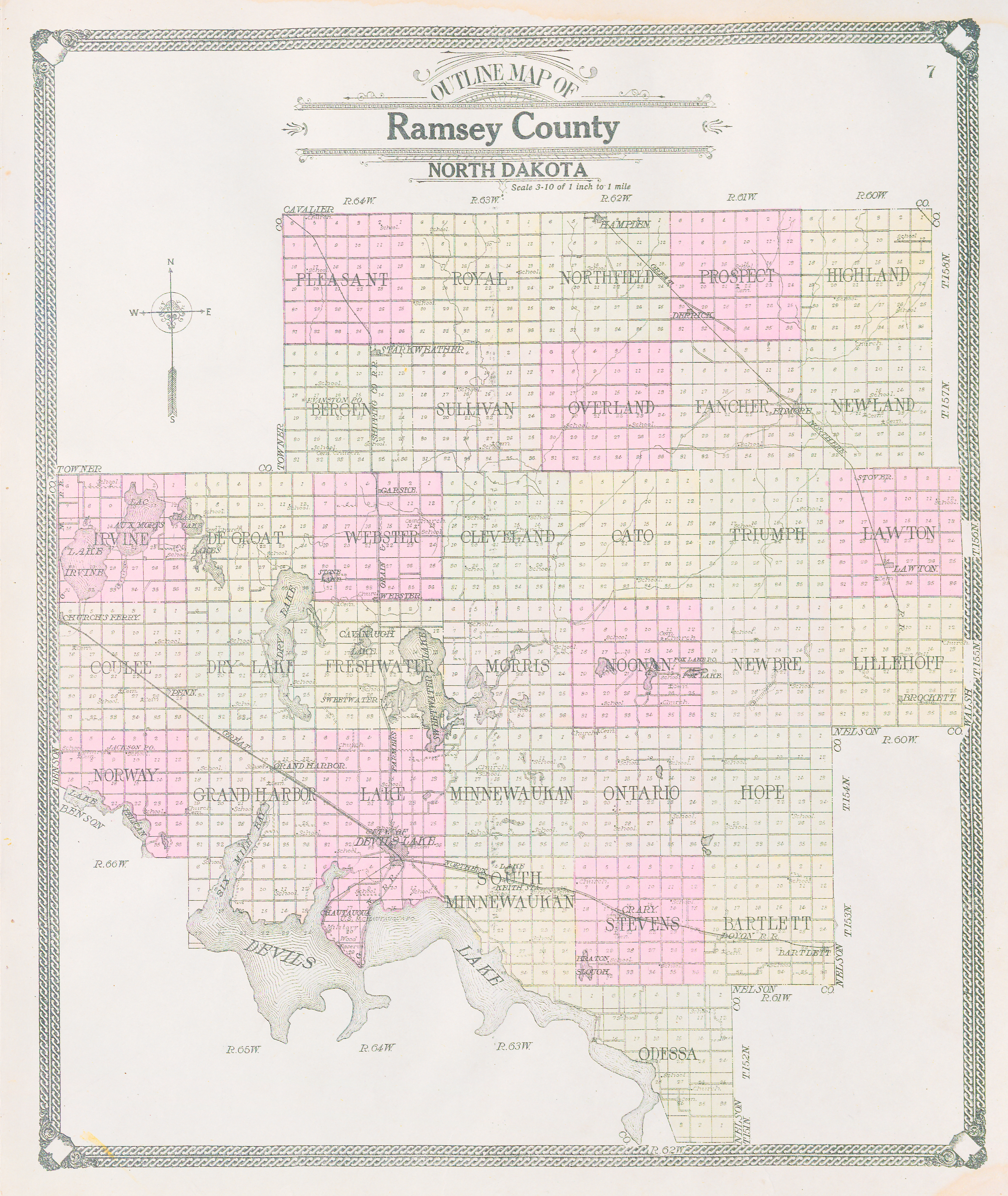
- Map of Ramsey County, including Lake Township, the former name of Creel Township, in 1909

- Location within the state of North Dakota Creel Township, North Dakota (the United States)
- Coordinates: 48°3′50.85″N 98°53′27.924″W
- Country: United States
- State: North Dakota
- County: Ramsey

Area
  - Total: 30.199 sq mi (78.215 km^{2})
  - Land: 14.578 sq mi (37.757 km^{2})
  - Water: 15.621 sq mi (40.458 km^{2})
- Elevation: 1,463 ft (446 m)

Population (2020)
  - Total: 1,394
  - Density: 106.0/sq mi (40.93/km^{2})
- Time zone: UTC-6 (Central (CST))
  - Summer (DST): UTC-5 (CDT)
- FIPS code: 38-071-16660
- GNIS feature ID: 1759569

Creel Township is one of 36 townships in Ramsey County, located in the state of North Dakota. In the 2020 United States Census, the population was listed at 1,394.

== History ==
Before 1900, the city of Devils Lake, now county seat of Ramsey County, was included as part of this township. The name of the township was changed from Lake to Creel in 1921. The township was entered into the Geographic Names Information System in August 1997. In June 2000, the township split, creating a new territory known as North Creel Township.

== Geography ==
Creel Township is located in the southern area of Ramsey County, sharing a notable border with Devils Lake, the county seat of Ramsey County, and Fort Totten, the largest community in Benson County. With around 14.6 square miles of land and 15.6 square miles of water, the township has slightly more water than land. In total, the township includes around 30.2 square miles of territory.

=== Bordering townships and areas ===
Creel is bordered by five other townships in Ramsey County, and Mission Township in Benson County, the latter being located in the Spirit Lake Reservation. The following townships in Ramsey and Benson counties border the Township of Creel:

- Grand Harbor Township, Ramsey County (northeast)
- Minnewaukan Township, Ramsey County (northwest)
- Mission Township, Benson County (southwest)
- North Creel Township, Ramsey County (north)
- Poplar Grove Township, Ramsey County (east)
- South Minnewaukan Township, Ramsey County (west)

In addition to these townships, Creel Township also borders the county seat of Ramsey County (Devils Lake) to the north, and to the southwest, the unincorporated township that surrounds Fort Totten.

=== Natural features and settlements ===
Creel Township is home to Camp Grafton, a military base and National Guard outpost in North Dakota. The unincorporated community of Lakewood Park (formerly North Chautauqua) is also found in the township, located a few miles southeast of the city of Devils Lake. The township includes coastal regions along Creel Bay and other parts of Devils Lake (the lake, not to be confused with the city), all located on the peninsula that encompasses most of Creel Township's land area.

== Demographics ==
As of the 2020 census, the population of Creel Township was 1,394, with 532 housing units and 458 families living in the area. About 92.1% of the population is white, and 99.4% speak only English, with the remaining 0.6% speaking other Indo-European languages. The median age was reported at 33, and the population was composed of 50.56% women and 49.44% men. In 1930, 1940 and 1950, the population of Creel Township was 578, 719, and 1,010 respectively.
