= KQZZ =

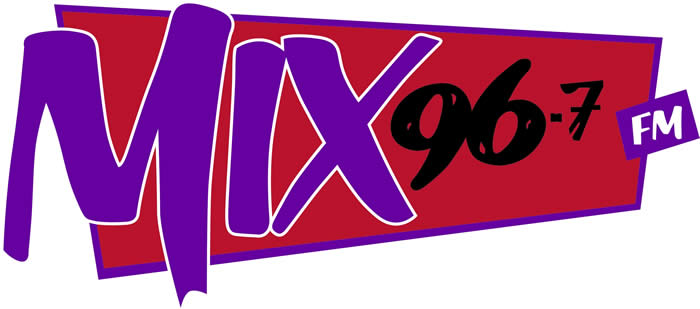
- Crary, North Dakota; United States
- Broadcast area: Devils Lake
- Frequency: 96.7 MHz
- Branding: Mix 96.7 FM

Programming
- Format: Hot adult contemporary
- Affiliations: ABC News Radio

Ownership
- Owner: i3G Media, Inc.; (Two Rivers Broadcasting, Inc.)
- Sister stations: KDLR, KDVL, KZZY

History
- First air date: 1995 (as KAOB)
- Former call signs: KAOB (1995–1996)

Technical information
- Licensing authority: FCC
- Facility ID: 56710
- Class: C2
- ERP: 38,000 watts
- HAAT: 171 meters (561 feet)
- Transmitter coordinates: 47°58′49″N 99°03′11″W

Links
- Public license information: Public file; LMS
- Webcast: Listen Live
- Website: www.lrradioworks.com/kqzz

KQZZ (96.7 FM, "Mix 96.7 FM") is an American commercial radio station licensed to serve Crary, North Dakota. The station is owned by i3G Media, Inc. KQZZ is operated along with its three sister stations under the collective name Lake Region Radio Works. It airs a hot adult contemporary music format.

KQZZ previously ran a longtime classic rock format known as "Q97" and later as "96.7 The Rock". "The Rock" evolved to a mainstream rock (a classic-based rock format incorporating some current rock to its playlist) in its later years. KQZZ flipped from its longtime rock format to hot adult contemporary as "Mix 96.7 FM" in April 2011.

The station was assigned the KQZZ call letters by the Federal Communications Commission on March 29, 1996.

Former branding
