= Mission Township, Benson County, North Dakota =

Mission Township
- Township
- Location of Mission within North Dakota
- Coordinates: 48°00′20″N 98°50′01″W
- Country: United States
- State: North Dakota
- County: Benson County
- Organized: c. 1910s

Area
  - Total: 44.77 sq mi (116.0 km^{2})
  - Land: 39.5 sq mi (102 km^{2})
  - Water: 5.27 sq mi (13.6 km^{2})
- Elevation: 1,437 ft (438 m)

Population (2000)
  - Total: 1,077
  - Density: 27.3/sq mi (10.5/km^{2})
- Time zone: UTC-6 (Central (MST))
  - Summer (DST): UTC-5 (CDT)
- Area code: 701
- FIPS code: 38-53580
- GNIS feature ID: 1759252

Mission Township is a civil township in Benson County, North Dakota, United States. As of the 2000 census, its population was 1,077. It is the most populous township in the county.

== History ==
Mission Township was formed from Wood Lake School Township in the mid-1910s. The township is named in honor of the mission school established here in 1874 by the Grey Nuns, a Roman Catholic religious institute from Montreal, Quebec, Canada. The school was established through the efforts of Major William H. Forbes, the first Indian agent on the Fort Totten Reservation, as the Spirit Lake Reservation was then known.

== Geography ==
Mission Township is located on the south shore of Devils Lake on the Spirit Lake Reservation. It is roughly 7 miles (11 km) east of the community of Fort Totten and 12 miles (19 km) south of the city of Devils Lake. According to the United States Census Bureau, the township has a total area of 44.77 square miles (116.0 km^{2}), making it the fourth largest township in the county. 88% of the township is land. Devils Lake's Mission Bay shares the township's name.

Mission Township lies in survey township T152N R64W and extends into portions of survey townships T153N R63W and R64W. North Dakota Highway 20 runs through the middle of the township.

=== Natural features ===
- Spring Lake: (47°56′46″N 98°49′09″W)
- Devils Lake
  - Black Tiger Bay:(47°57′54″N 98°46′50″W)
  - Mission Bay: (47°59′47″N 98°51′44″W)

=== Adjacent townships/areas ===
- Creel Township, Ramsey County (north)
- Lohnes Township (east)
- Wood Lake Township (south)
- Fort Totten Unorganized Territory (west)

=== Cities and populated places ===
- Saint Michael

== Demographics ==
Population since 1910
Census	Pop.	Note	%±
1910	72		—
1920	423		487.5%
1930	445		5.2%
1940	600		34.8%
1950	587		−2.2%
1960	582		−0.9%
1970	691		18.7%
1980	857		24.0%
1990	1,044		21.8%
2000	1,077		3.2%
2008 (est.)	1,087
www.census.gov

As of the 2000 Census, there were 1,077 people, 273 households and 231 families residing in the township. The population density was 27.3 inhabitants per square mile (10.5/km^{2}). There were 300 housing units at an average density of 7.6 per square mile (2.9/km^{2}). The racial makeup of the township was 84.4% American Indian or Alaska Native, 13.6% White, and 2.0% from two or more races. Hispanic or Latino of any race were 0.5% of the population.

There were 273 households, 231 of which were families. 55.3% of households had children under the age of 18 living with them, 39.6% were married couples living together, 32.6% had a female householder with no husband present and 15.4% were non-families. 12.1% of all households were made up of individuals, and 2.6% had someone living alone, who was 65 years of age or older. The average household size was 3.95 and the average family size was 4.03.

In the township, the population was spread out, with 46.1% under the age of 18, 10.4% from 18 to 24, 23.9% from 25 to 44, 16.0% from 45 to 64 and 3.6% who were 65 years of age or older. The median age was 20 years. For every 100 females, there were 94.1 males. For every 100 females age 18 and over, there were 98.6 males.

The median income for a household in the township was $28,125 and the median income for a family was $24,583. Males had a median income of $21,111 versus $16,991 for females. The per capita income for the village was $7,899. About 35.0% of families and 39.2% of the population were below the poverty line, including 49.0% of those under age 18 and 19.4% of those age 65 or over. 15.2% of the population was unemployed.
