= KZZY =

Radio station in Devils Lake, North Dakota

- Devils Lake, North Dakota; United States
- Broadcast area: Devils Lake-New Rockford
- Frequency: 103.5 MHz
- Branding: Double Z Country

Programming
- Format: Country
- Affiliations: ABC News Radio; United Stations Radio Networks; Westwood One

Ownership
- Owner: Double Z Broadcasting, Inc.
- Sister stations: KDLR, KDVL, KQZZ

History
- First air date: 1984
- Call sign meaning: Double Z CountrY

Technical information
- Licensing authority: FCC
- Facility ID: 17358
- Class: C1
- ERP: 100,000 watts
- HAAT: 138 meters (453 feet)
- Transmitter coordinates: 47°58′49″N 99°3′11″W

Links
- Public license information: Public file; LMS
- Webcast: Listen Live
- Website: KZZY Online

KZZY (103.5 FM, "Double Z Country") is an American commercial radio station licensed to serve Devils Lake, North Dakota. The station is owned by Double Z Broadcasting, Inc., and operated along with its three sister stations under the collective name Lake Region Radio Works. It airs a country music format.

The station was assigned the KZZY call letters by the Federal Communications Commission.
