= Grant Nelson (basketball) =

American basketball player (born 2002)

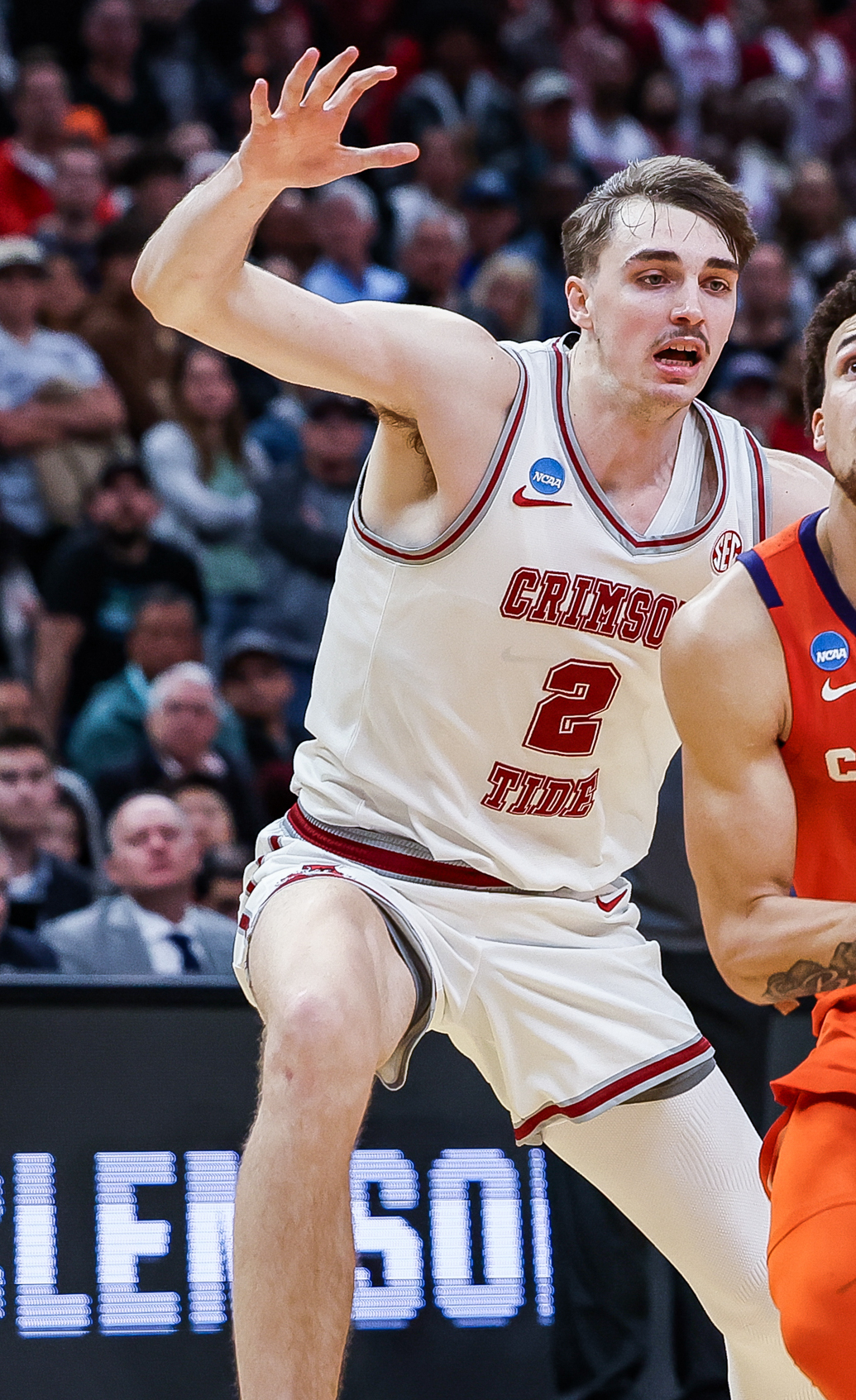
- Nelson with Alabama in 2024

No. 16 – Brooklyn Nets
- Position: Power forward
- League: NBA

Personal information
- Born: March 18, 2002 (age 24) Devils Lake, North Dakota, U.S.
- Listed height: 6 ft 10 in (2.08 m)
- Listed weight: 240 lb (109 kg)

Career information
- High school: Devils Lake (Devils Lake, North Dakota)
- College: North Dakota State (2020–2023); Alabama (2023–2025)
- NBA draft: 2025: undrafted
- Playing career: 2025–present

Career history
- 2025-2026: Long Island Nets
- 2026–present: Brooklyn Nets
- 2026–present: →Long Island Nets

Career highlights
- First team All-Summit League (2023); Summit League All-Defensive Team (2023); Summit League Sixth Man of the Year (2021); North Dakota Mr. Basketball (2020)
- Stats at NBA.com
- Stats at Basketball Reference

Grant Nelson (born March 18, 2002) is an American professional basketball player for the Brooklyn Nets of the National Basketball Association (NBA), on a two-way contract with the Long Island Nets of the NBA G League. He played college basketball for the Alabama Crimson Tide and the North Dakota State Bison.

== Early life and high school career ==
Nelson grew up in Devils Lake, North Dakota and attended Devils Lake High School. He played mostly on the junior varsity team as a freshman and sophomore. Nelson averaged 16.4 points, 11.5 rebounds, and 5.1 blocks per game and was named second team All-State during his junior season. He was named North Dakota Mr. Basketball as a senior after averaging 25 points, 18 rebounds, and 5.7 blocks per game. Nelson committed to playing college basketball for North Dakota State over offers from North Dakota and Division II programs Northern State, University of Mary, Minot State, and Minnesota State-Moorhead.

== College career ==
=== North Dakota State ===
Nelson played in all 27 of NDSU's games, with five starts as a freshman and was named the Summit League Sixth Man of the Year after averaging 6.3 points and 3.7 rebounds per game. He became a starter as a sophomore and averaged 11.6 points and 4.9 rebounds per game. During Nelson's junior season, a highlight reel of his play went viral in early January 2023. As a junior, Grant averaged 17.9 points and 9.3 rebounds per game, as well as shooting 52.1% from the field. These stats also earned him his first All-Summit First Team and All-Summit Defensive Team honors.

=== Alabama ===
Following the 2022–23 season, Nelson explored his options in the 2023 NBA draft but ultimately withdrew to return to college for his senior season. On June 12, 2023, he transferred to Alabama after spending three seasons at North Dakota State. Nelson averaged 11.9 points, 5.9 rebounds, and 1.6 blocks per game for the Crimson Tide in 2023-24. In the Sweet 16 of the 2024 NCAA Tournament against North Carolina, he posted 24 points, 12 rebounds, and 5 blocks, helping Alabama advance to the Elite 8 for the second time in program history on their way to their first ever Final Four. On April 29, 2024, he announced he was returning for his final season at Alabama. In his final season of collegiate eligibility for Alabama, he averaged 11.5 points, 7.6 rebounds, and 1.2 blocks per game, helping the Crimson Tide reach the Elite 8 as a 2-seed in the 2025 NCAA Tournament. He was a huge factor in Alabama's overtime victory at archrival Auburn in the final game of the regular season, scoring 23 points and grabbing 8 rebounds versus the Tigers.

== Professional career ==
After going undrafted in the 2025 NBA draft, Nelson signed an Exhibit 10 contract with the Brooklyn Nets to compete for a two-way contract. During the 2025 NBA Summer League, Nelson appeared in all five games and averaged 6.0 points, 4.4 rebounds and 1.2 assists in 19.1 minutes per game.

On October 15, 2025, the Nets officially announced that they signed Nelson to a training camp deal, but waived him on October 18. He later signed with the Long Island Nets of the NBA G League on November 3.

On February 27, 2026, the Nets signed Nelson to a 10-day contract, where he saw his first NBA minutes. Across four appearances for Brooklyn, Nelson averaged 4.3 points, 1.5 rebounds, and 1.3 assists. Following the expiry of his contract on March 9, the Nets elected not to re-sign Nelson. On March 13, it was announced that Nelson had returned to Long Island; concurrently it was revealed that Brooklyn had not re-signed Nelson due to patellar tendinitis that would sideline him for the remainder of the season.

On September 4, 2026, Nelson re–signed with Brooklyn on a two-way contract.

== Career statistics ==
Legend
GP	Games played	GS	Games started	MPG	Minutes per game
FG%	Field goal percentage	3P%	3-point field goal percentage	FT%	Free throw percentage
RPG	Rebounds per game	APG	Assists per game	SPG	Steals per game
BPG	Blocks per game	PPG	Points per game	**Bold**	Career high

=== NBA ===
Year	Team	GP	GS	MPG	FG%	3P%	FT%	RPG	APG	SPG	BPG	PPG
2025–26	Brooklyn	4	0	8.8	.556		.700	1.5	1.3	.3	1.3	4.3
Career		4	0	8.8	.556		.700	1.5	1.3	.3	1.3	4.3

=== College ===
Year	Team	GP	GS	MPG	FG%	3P%	FT%	RPG	APG	SPG	BPG	PPG
2020–21	North Dakota State	27	5	20.9	.471	**.356**	.711	3.7	.6	.2	.9	6.3
2021–22	North Dakota State	29	21	25.8	.508	.322	.733	4.9	1.1	.2	1.3	11.6
2022–23	North Dakota State	30	30	**30.7**	.521	.269	.720	**9.3**	**2.1**	**.8**	**1.7**	**17.9**
2023–24	Alabama	**37**	**37**	25.6	.488	.273	**.813**	5.9	1.5	0.6	1.6	11.9
2024–25	Alabama	**37**	**37**	25.5	**.522**	.258	.667	7.6	1.6	0.5	1.2	11.5
Career		160	130	25.7	.502	.296	.729	6.3	1.4	.5	1.3	11.8
