= Treysen Eaglestaff =

American basketball player (born 2004)

No. 52 – UC San Diego Tritons
- Position: Shooting guard
- League: Big West Conference

Personal information
- Born: June 13, 2004 (age 22)
- Listed height: 6 ft 6 in (1.98 m)
- Listed weight: 205 lb (93 kg)

Career information
- High school: Bismarck (Bismarck, North Dakota)
- College: North Dakota (2022–2025); West Virginia (2025–2026); UC San Diego (2026–)
- NBA draft: 2026: undrafted

Career highlights
- College Basketball Crown champion (2026); Second–team All–Summit League (2025); North Dakota Mr. Basketball (2022)

Treysen Eaglestaff (born June 13, 2004) is an American college basketball player for the UC San Diego Tritons. He previously played for the North Dakota Fighting Hawks and West Virginia Mountaineers and also appeared in two NBA summer league games for the New York Knicks.

== Early life and high school career ==
Eaglestaff grew up in Mandan, North Dakota and is an enrolled member of the Cheyenne River Sioux Tribe. His mother is Erica Sundahl. He is named after his grandfather, Robert Eaglestaff, who is a member of the University of North Dakota's Athletics Hall of Fame and the Lakota Nation Hall of Fame.

He attended Bismarck High School. As a senior he averaged 30.3 points and 8.3 rebounds per game and earned first team All-State honors for the second year in a row. During his senior year he was also named North Dakota Mr. Basketball, the first person from his high school to ever do so. On July 5, 2021, Eaglestaff announced his commitment to play basketball for North Dakota. He also received an offer from Abilene Christian.

== College career ==
=== North Dakota ===
As a freshman, Eaglestaff played in 33 games and started in 11 of them. He averaged 8.4 points, 2.5 rebounds, and 1.7 assists per game. As a sophomore he started in all 32 of North Dakota's games, averaging 14.4 points, 2.3 rebounds, and 1.5 assists per game. As a junior he appeared in and started in 33 games, averaging 18.9 points, 2.8 rebounds, and 2.4 assists per game.

During the 2024–25 season, Eaglestaff made national headlines after scoring 40 points against No. 6 Alabama, becoming the first mid-major player to score 40 points against an AP-Top 10 opponent since 2012. He again received national attention after scoring 51 points against South Dakota State during the quarterfinal round of the 2025 Summit League men's basketball tournament.

On March 11, 2025 it was announced that Eaglestaff would be entering the transfer portal.

=== West Virginia ===
On March 30, 2025, Eaglestaff announced his commitment to play for the South Carolina Gamecocks in the 2025–26 season over offers from Kansas, Kentucky, and Gonzaga. Eaglestaff decommitted from South Carolina and re-entered the transfer portal on April 16, 2025.

On April 20, 2025, Eaglestaff announced his commitment to play for the West Virginia Mountaineers of the Big 12 Conference. He averaged 9.8 points and 4.6 rebounds per game. Eaglestaff played through injuries and helped West Virginia win the 2026 College Basketball Crown title.

=== NBA Summer League ===
On July 1, 2026, it was announced that Eaglestaff would join the New York Knicks during the 2026 NBA Summer League. Eaglestaff appeared in two games, averaging 1.5 points, 0.5 rebounds, and 2.0 assists in 4.6 minutes played per game.

=== UC San Diego ===
Eaglestaff returned to college and signed with the UC San Diego Tritons on August 22, 2026, following a preliminary injunction granting class of 2022 High School graduates a fifth year of NCAA eligibility.

== Career statistics ==
Legend
GP	Games played	GS	Games started	MPG	Minutes per game
FG%	Field goal percentage	3P%	3-point field goal percentage	FT%	Free throw percentage
RPG	Rebounds per game	APG	Assists per game	SPG	Steals per game
BPG	Blocks per game	PPG	Points per game	**Bold**	Career high

=== College ===
Year	Team	GP	GS	MPG	FG%	3P%	FT%	RPG	APG	SPG	BPG	PPG
2022–23	North Dakota	33	11	19.5	.405	.375	.480	2.5	1.7	0.8	0.3	8.4
2023–24	North Dakota	32	32	28.5	**.434**	**.383**	**.811**	2.3	1.5	.7	**.4**	14.4
2024–25	North Dakota	33	33	**31.8**	.416	.359	.794	2.8	**2.4**	**1.1**	.2	**18.9**
2025–26	West Virginia	**35**	**35**	28.5	.387	.343	.745	**4.6**	1.4	.9	**.4**	9.8
Career		130	108	27.1	.413	.362	.761	3.1	1.8	.9	.3	12.8
