= Devils Lake High School =

American public high school

Location
- 1601 College Drive N Devils Lake, North Dakota 58301; United States; 48°07′34″N 98°52′06″W

Information
- School type: Public, high school
- Established: 1909; 117 years ago
- School district: Devils Lake Public Schools
- Principal: Ryan Hanson
- Teaching staff: 33.00 (FTE)
- Grades: 9–12
- Enrollment: 539 (2023–2024)
- Student to teacher ratio: 16.33
- Colors: Red, white and black
- Nickname: Firebirds
- Accreditation: Cognia
- Website: dlhs.dlschools.org

Devils Lake High School is a public high school located in Devils Lake, North Dakota. It is part of the Devils Lake Public Schools system. The athletic teams are known as the Firebirds. The principal is Ryan Hanson.

The district serves Devils Lake and Crary. North Dakota School for the Deaf has sign language teachers teach American Sign Language at Devils Lake High. Students in grades 9-12 living at the NDSD are sent to Devils Lake High.

== History ==
NDSD ended its direct high school classes in 2012, paving the way for NDSD high school boarders to be sent to Devils Lake High.

== Dress code ==
In 2014, the school dress code was adjusted, prohibiting tight blue jeans, leggings, and jeggings.

== Athletics ==
The high school received national attention in 2002 over its controversial nickname, the Satans. Several parents refused to send their children to the school due to this nickname. In 2003, a poll was conducted of the school's students to pick a new, less controversial nickname. The winning name was the Blaze but the school board, thinking it was a drug reference, rejected it and chose the Firebirds. Firebirds has been the name ever since.

=== Championships ===
- State Class 'A' boys' basketball: 1925, 2024
- State Class 'A' girls' basketball: 1981, 1984, 1987, 2024
- State Class ‘AA’ boys’ football: 2025

== Notable alumni ==
- Grant Nelson (2020), basketball player
