= Austin Dufault =

American basketball player (born 1990)

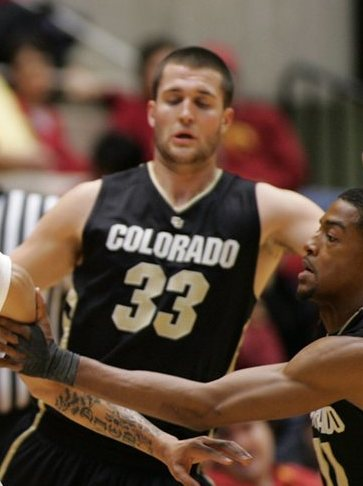
- Dufault playing for Colorado in 2011

Personal information
- Born: January 3, 1990 (age 36) Dickinson, North Dakota, U.S.
- Listed height: 6 ft 9 in (2.06 m)
- Listed weight: 225 lb (102 kg)

Career information
- High school: Killdeer (Killdeer, North Dakota)
- College: Colorado (2008–2012)
- NBA draft: 2012: undrafted
- Playing career: 2012–2018
- Position: Power forward
- Number: 15

Career history
- 2012–2013: NH Ostrava
- 2013: Prostějov
- 2013–2014: Kožuv
- 2014–2015: Souffelweyersheim
- 2015–2016: Salon Vilpas Vikings
- 2016–2017: Soproni KC
- 2017–2018: Niigata Albirex BB

Career highlights
- North Dakota Mr. Basketball (2008)

Austin Lee Dufault (born January 3, 1990) is an American former professional basketball player who last played for Niigata Albirex BB of the B.League. He currently serves as the director of player development for the Chicago Bulls of the National Basketball Association (NBA).

== College statistics ==
Year	Team	GP	GS	MPG	FG%	3P%	FT%	RPG	APG	SPG	BPG	PPG
2008–09	Colorado	31	31	30.7	.425	.245	.671	3.7	1.0	0.4	0.1	8.2
2009–10	Colorado	31	26	21.5	.453	.381	.593	3.1	0.9	0.7	0.4	5.5
2010–11	Colorado	38	38	22.2	.523	.192	.629	4.2	0.7	0.6	0.6	6.6
2011–12	Colorado	36	35	27.1	.486	.359	.689	4.4	0.9	0.6	0.3	11.1
Career		136	130	25.3	.473	.308	.655	3.9	0.9	0.6	0.3	7.9

== Professional career ==
During his career, Dufault has played in Czech Republic, Macedonia, Finland, France and Hungary.

=== The Basketball Tournament (TBT) (2016–present) ===
In the summers of 2016 and 2017, Dufault played in The Basketball Tournament on ESPN with Team Colorado (Colorado Alumni). He competed for the $2 million prize, and for Team Colorado in 2017, he averaged 9.7 points per game shooting 54 percent inside the arc. As a No. 1 seed in the West Region, Dufault helped take Team Colorado to the Super 16 Round, but was defeated by Armored Athlete 84–75.

== Executive career ==
On August 19, 2025, the Chicago Bulls named Dufault as their director of player development.
