= J. Hunter Wickersham =

United States Army Medal of Honor recipient

John Hunter Wickersham
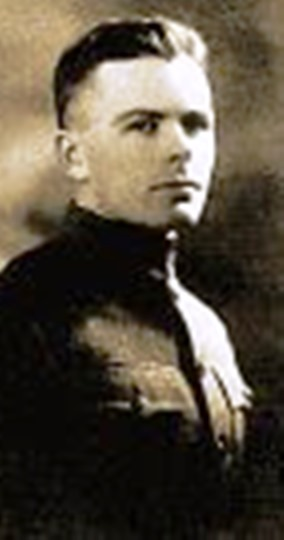
- Medal of Honor recipient
- Born: February 3, 1890; New York City, US
- Died: September 12, 1918 (aged 28) near Limey, France
- Burial place: St. Mihiel American Cemetery, Thiaucourt, France
- Military career
- Allegiance: United States
- Branch: United States Army
- Rank: Second Lieutenant
- Units: 353rd Infantry Regiment, 89th Division
- Conflicts: World War I; Battle of Saint-Mihiel †
- Awards: Medal of Honor; Croce al Merito di Guerra (Italy)

John Hunter Wickersham (February 3, 1890 – September 12, 1918) was a United States Army officer and a recipient of the United States military's highest decoration—the Medal of Honor—for his actions in World War I.

== Biography ==
Wickersham was born in Brooklyn, New York on February 3, 1890, to Mary E. Damon. He moved to Denver, Colorado when a small boy and received his education in Denver. In May 1917, a month after the American entry into World War I, he graduated from the First Officers Training Camp at Camp Funston on Fort Riley, Kansas. He was commissioned a Second Lieutenant and assigned to Company H, 353rd Infantry, 89th Division. By September 11, 1918, he was serving in France. On that day, as his unit prepared to take part in an offensive which would become the Battle of Saint-Mihiel, Wickersham wrote one last letter home to his mother in Denver. The letter contained a poem, "The Raindrops on Your Old Tin Hat", which was later published.

The next day, on September 12, Wickersham was severely wounded near Limey, France, but continued to lead his platoon in its advance until collapsing and succumbing to his injuries. For these actions, he was posthumously awarded the Medal of Honor in 1919.

== Medal of Honor Citation ==
Gravestone at St. Mihiel American Cemetery

Rank and organization: Second Lieutenant, U.S. Army, Company H, 353rd Infantry, 89th Division. Place and date: At Limey, France; September 12, 1918. Entered service at: Denver Colorado. Birth: February 3, 1890; New York, New York. General Orders: War Department, General Orders No. 16 ( January 22, 1919).

Citation:

Advancing with his platoon during the St. Mihiel offensive, Second Lieutenant Wickersham was severely wounded in four places by the bursting of a high-explosive shell. Before receiving any aid for himself he dressed the wounds of his orderly, who was wounded at the same time. He then ordered and accompanied the further advance of his platoon, although weakened by the loss of blood. His right hand and arm being disabled by wounds, he continued to fire his revolver with his left hand until, exhausted by loss of blood, he fell and died from his wounds before aid could be administered.

== Military Awards ==
Wickersham's military decorations and awards include:

1st row	Medal of Honor	World War I Victory Medal w/two bronze service stars to denote credit for the St. Mihiel and Defensive Sector battle clasps.	Croce al Merito di Guerra (Italy)

Wickersham, aged 28 at his death, was buried at the St. Mihiel American Cemetery in Thiaucourt, France. A marker in his memory was placed at Fairmount Cemetery in Denver, Colorado.

The poem he wrote to his mother the day before he died reads as follows:

The mist hangs low and quiet on a ragged line of hills,
There's a whispering of wind across the flat,
You'd be feeling kind of lonesome if it wasn't for one thing—
The patter of the raindrops on your old tin hat.

An' you can't help a-figuring—sitting there alone—
About this war and hero stuff and that,
And you wonder if they haven't sort of got things twisted up,
While the rain keeps up its patter on your old tin hat.

When you step off with the outfit to do your little bit
You're simply doing what you're s'posed to do—
And you don't take time to figure what you gain or lose—
It's the spirit of the game that brings you through.

But back at home she's waiting, writing cheerful little notes,
And every night she offers up a prayer
And just keeps on a-hoping that her soldier boy is safe—
The Mother of the boy who's over there.

And, fellows, she's the hero of this great, big ugly war,
And her prayer is on the wind across the flat,
And don't you reckon maybe it's her tears, and not the rain,
That's keeping up the patter on your old tin hat?
|"The Raindrops on Your Old Tin Hat" by J. Hunter Wickersham

== See also ==
- List of Medal of Honor recipients
