= North Dakota Mr. Basketball =

Honor awarded to high school basketball players

Each year the North Dakota Mr. Basketball award is given to the person chosen as the best high school boys basketball senior player in the U.S. state of North Dakota.

The award has been given since 1985. Winners are chosen by the North Dakota Associated Press Sportscasters and Sportswriters Association (NDAPSSA). As of 2026, there has been a total of two winners from Class AA, 26 winners from Class A, and 17 winners from Class B.

== Award winners ==
Year	Winner	School	Class	University
2026	Carter Evanson	West Fargo Horace	AA	University of North Dakota
2025	Mason Klabo	Fargo Davies	AA	Illinois State University
2024	Deng Deng	Four Winds/Minnewaukan	A	University of North Dakota (football)
2023	Darik Dissette	Minot	A	North Dakota State University
2022	Treysen Eaglestaff	Bismarck	A	University of North Dakota; West Virginia University; UC San Diego
2021	Jesse White	White Shield	B	North Dakota State College of Science
2020	Grant Nelson	Devils Lake	A	North Dakota State University; University of Alabama
2019	Mason Walters	Jamestown	A	University of Jamestown; University of Wyoming
2018	Wyatt Hanson	Stanley	B	Minnesota State University Moorhead
2017	Aanen Moody	Dickinson	A	University of North Dakota; Southern Utah University; University of Montana
2016	Jason Feather	Four Winds/Minnewaukan	B	Lake Region State College
2015	Brad Heidlebaugh	Rugby	B	University of North Dakota (football)
2014	Tanner Kretchman	Fargo Davies	A	Minnesota State University Moorhead
2013	A.J. Jacobson	Fargo Shanley	A	North Dakota State University
2012	Melvin Langstaff	Warwick	B	Lake Region State College
2011	Phillip Shanilec	Midway/Minto	B	South Dakota School of Mines
2010	Adam Randall	Kidder County	B	Minot State University
2009	Cameron Malzer	Turtle Lake-Mercer	B	Minot State University
2008	Austin Dufault	Killdeer	B	University of Colorado
2007	Brian Qvale	Williston	A	University of Montana
2006	Travis Mertens	Devils Lake	A	University of North Dakota
2005	James Hennessy	Williston	A	Montana State University
2004	Lucas Moorman	Dickinson	A	North Dakota State University
2003	Tyler Koenig	Fargo North	A	University of North Dakota
2002	Tommy Leikas	Fargo North	A	University of North Dakota
2001	Adam Dobmeier	Fargo South	A	North Dakota State University
2000	Tyrone Terry	Valley City	A	University of Texas at San Antonio
1999	Jeff Brandt	Minot	A	Minot State University
1998	Jeff Boschee	Valley City	A	University of Kansas
1997	Travis Sturdevant	Bismarck Century	A	North Dakota State University
1996	Kenny Younger	Minot	A	University of Houston
1995	Hunter Berg	Grenora	B	Williston State College; University of North Dakota
1994	Dustin Undlin	Mohall	B	Northern State University
1993	Randy Torgrimson	West Fargo	A	United States Naval Academy
1992	Marty McDonald	Munich	B	University of Jamestown
1991	Bart Manson	Minot	A	Minot State University
1990	Rob Stefonowicz	Divide County	B	North Dakota State University
1989 (tie)	Chris Gardner	Fargo South	A	University of North Dakota
1989 (tie)	Ben Jacobson	Mayville-Portland	B	University of North Dakota
1988	Scott Guldseth	Edinburg	B	Louisiana State University; University of North Dakota
1987	Bryan Flam	Jamestown	A	Concordia College
1986	Todd Olson	Cavalier	B	Mayville State University
1985 (tie)	Juno Pintar	Fargo North	A	North Dakota State University
1985 (tie)	Chris Lamoureux	Newburg	B	Minot State University

=== Schools/Teams with multiple winners ===
School	Total	Years
Minot	4	1991, 1996, 1999, 2023
Fargo North	3	1985, 2002, 2003
Fargo South	2	1989, 2001
Valley City	2	1998, 2000
Williston	2	2005, 2007
Dickinson	2	2004, 2017
Jamestown	2	1987, 2019
Devils Lake	2	2006, 2020
Four Winds/Minnewaukan	2	2016, 2024
Fargo Davies	2	2014, 2025

=== Universities with multiple winners ===
University	Total	Years
University of North Dakota	11	1988, 1989,1989, 2002, 2003, 2006, 2015, 2017, 2022, 2024, 2026
North Dakota State University	8	1985, 1990, 1997, 2001, 2004, 2013, 2020, 2023
Minot State University	5	1985, 1991, 1999, 2009, 2010
Lake Region State College	2	2012, 2016
Minnesota State University Moorhead	2	2014, 2018
University of Jamestown	2	1992, 2019
University of Montana	2	2007, 2017

== See also ==
North Dakota Miss Basketball
