= North Dakota Miss Basketball =

High school girls' basketball award in North Dakota

The North Dakota Miss Basketball award is given to the person chosen as the best senior high school girls basketball player in the U.S. state of North Dakota.

Since 1984, the North Dakota Associated Press Sportscasters and Sportswriters Association (NDAPSSA) has annually awarded recipients. (NDAPSSA).

== Award winners ==
Year	Award Winner	School	Class	University
2026	Leelee Bell	Minot	AA	University of Oklahoma
2025	Jaiden Haile	West Fargo Horace	AA	Gonzaga University
2024	Jocelyn Schiller	Red River High School	AA	University of North Dakota; North Dakota State University
2023	Logan Nissley	Bismarck Century	A	University of Nebraska
2022	Abby Duchscherer	Kindred	B	University of Alabama (softball)
2021	Samantha Oase	Hettinger/Scranton	B	Black Hills State University
2020	Reile Payne	Fargo Shanley	A	Bismarck State College (Volleyball and Basketball); Ottawa University (volleyball)
2019	Megan Zander	Mandan	A	University of North Dakota; University of Mary
2018	Anna Holen	LaMoure/Litchville-Marion	B	University of Jamestown (volleyball)
2017	Tylee Irwin	Wahpeton	A	South Dakota State University
2016	Sarah Jacobson	Fargo Shanley	A	North Dakota State University
2015	Hannah Stewart	Minot Bishop Ryan	B	University of Iowa
2014	Paige Peterson	Jamestown	A	Augustana University
2013	Hannah Larson	Bismarck Century	A	University of Mary
2012	Holly Johnson	Minot	A	North Dakota State University
2011	Caitlin Farroh	Grand Forks Central	A	Northern State University
2010	Eli Benz	Kidder County	B	Gustavus Adolphus College
2009	Ali Collins	Mandan	A	University of Mary
2008	Christine Miller	New Town	B	Williston State College
2007	Jessica Kielpinski	Mandan	A	University of North Dakota
2006	Rebecca Feickert	Sheridan County	B	University of Kansas
2005	Rebecca Kielpinski	Mandan	A	University of Alaska Anchorage
2004	Ruthie Dockter	Washburn	B	University of North Dakota
2003	Carissa Jahner	Fargo North	A	University of North Dakota
2001	Katie Lorenz	Langdon	B	North Dakota State University
2000	Kari Hanson	Mandan	A	Kansas State University
1999	Lora Schauer	Wishek	B	North Dakota State University
1998	Mary Perrizo	Mandan	A	University of North Dakota
1997	Angie Welle	Fargo Shanley	A	Iowa State University
1996	Jaye Amundson	Mandan	A	North Dakota State University
1995 (tie)	Lisa Maus	Hatton	B	University of Mary
1995 (tie)	Katie Richards	Hope-Page	B	University of North Dakota
1995 (tie)	Nina Topp	Midkota	B	Weber State University
1994	Brenna Stefonowicz	Divide County	B	North Dakota State University
1993	Tanya Fischer	Bowman	B	North Dakota State University
1992	Shelly Berg	Minot	A	Weber State University
1991	Christy Waldal	Beach	A	University of North Dakota
1990	Lynette Mund	Milnor	B	North Dakota State University
1989	Sarah Hokenson	Fargo Shanley	A	North Dakota State University
1988	Nadine Schmidt	Braddock	B	North Dakota State University
1987	Wanda Schwab	Esmond/Maddock	B	Valley City State University
1986	Sue Hesch	Wahpeton	A	University of Nebraska
1985 (tie)	Durene Heisler	Devils Lake	A	University of North Dakota
1985 (tie)	Whitney Meier	Rolla	B	Louisiana State University
1984	Pat Smykowski	Lidgerwood	B	North Dakota State University

=== Schools with multiple winners ===
School	Number of Awards	Years
Mandan	7	1996, 1998, 2000, 2005, 2007, 2009, 2019
Fargo Shanley	4	1989, 1997, 2016, 2020
Minot	3	1992, 2012, 2026
Wahpeton	2	1986, 2017
Bismarck Century	2	2013, 2023

=== Universities with multiple winners ===
University	Number of Awards	Years
North Dakota State University	12	1984, 1988, 1989, 1990, 1993, 1994, 1996, 1999, 2001, 2012, 2016, 2024
University of North Dakota	9	1985, 1991, 1995, 1998, 2003, 2004, 2007, 2019, 2024
University of Mary	4	1995, 2009, 2013, 2019
Weber State University	2	1992, 1995
University of Nebraska	2	1986, 2023

== See also ==
North Dakota Mr. Basketball
