= KDLR =

- Devils Lake, North Dakota; United States
- Frequency: 1240 kHz
- Branding: KDLR 1240 AM

Programming
- Format: Classic country
- Affiliations: CBS News Radio; Minnesota Twins; Minnesota Vikings

Ownership
- Owner: Double Z Broadcasting, Inc.
- Sister stations: KZZY, KDVL, KQZZ

History
- First air date: January 31, 1925 (at 1300)
- Former frequencies: 1300 kHz (1925–1928); 1210 kHz (1928–1941)
- Call sign meaning: K Devils Lake Radio

Technical information
- Licensing authority: FCC
- Facility ID: 15272
- Class: C
- Power: 1,000 watts unlimited
- Transmitter coordinates: 48°6′42″N 98°50′43″W
- Translator: 99.7 K259CV (Devils Lake)

Links
- Public license information: Public file; LMS
- Webcast: Listen Live
- Website: www.lrradioworks.com/kdlr

KDLR (1240 AM) is an American commercial radio station licensed to serve Devils Lake, North Dakota. The station is owned by Double Z Broadcasting, Inc., and operated along with its three sister stations under the collective name Lake Region Radio Works. It airs a classic country music format.

== History ==
The station was assigned the KDLR call letters in 1925 by the U.S. Department of Commerce, regulators of radio at the time. KDLR was originally on 1300 kHz.

Following the establishment of the Federal Radio Commission (FRC), stations were initially issued a series of temporary authorizations starting on May 3, 1927. In addition, they were informed that if they wanted to continue operating, they needed to file a formal license application by January 15, 1928, as the first step in determining whether they met the new "public interest, convenience, or necessity" standard. On May 25, 1928, the FRC issued General Order 32, which notified 164 stations, including KDLR, that "From an examination of your application for future license it does not find that public interest, convenience, or necessity would be served by granting it." However, the station successfully convinced the commission that it should remain licensed.

On November 11, 1928, the FRC implemented a major reallocation of station transmitting frequencies, as part of a reorganization resulting from its adoption of General Order 40, and KDLR was assigned to 1210 kHz. It moved to 1240 kHz in 1941 with the implementation of the North American Regional Broadcasting Agreement.

Logo before translator sign on
