= Crary, North Dakota =

- City
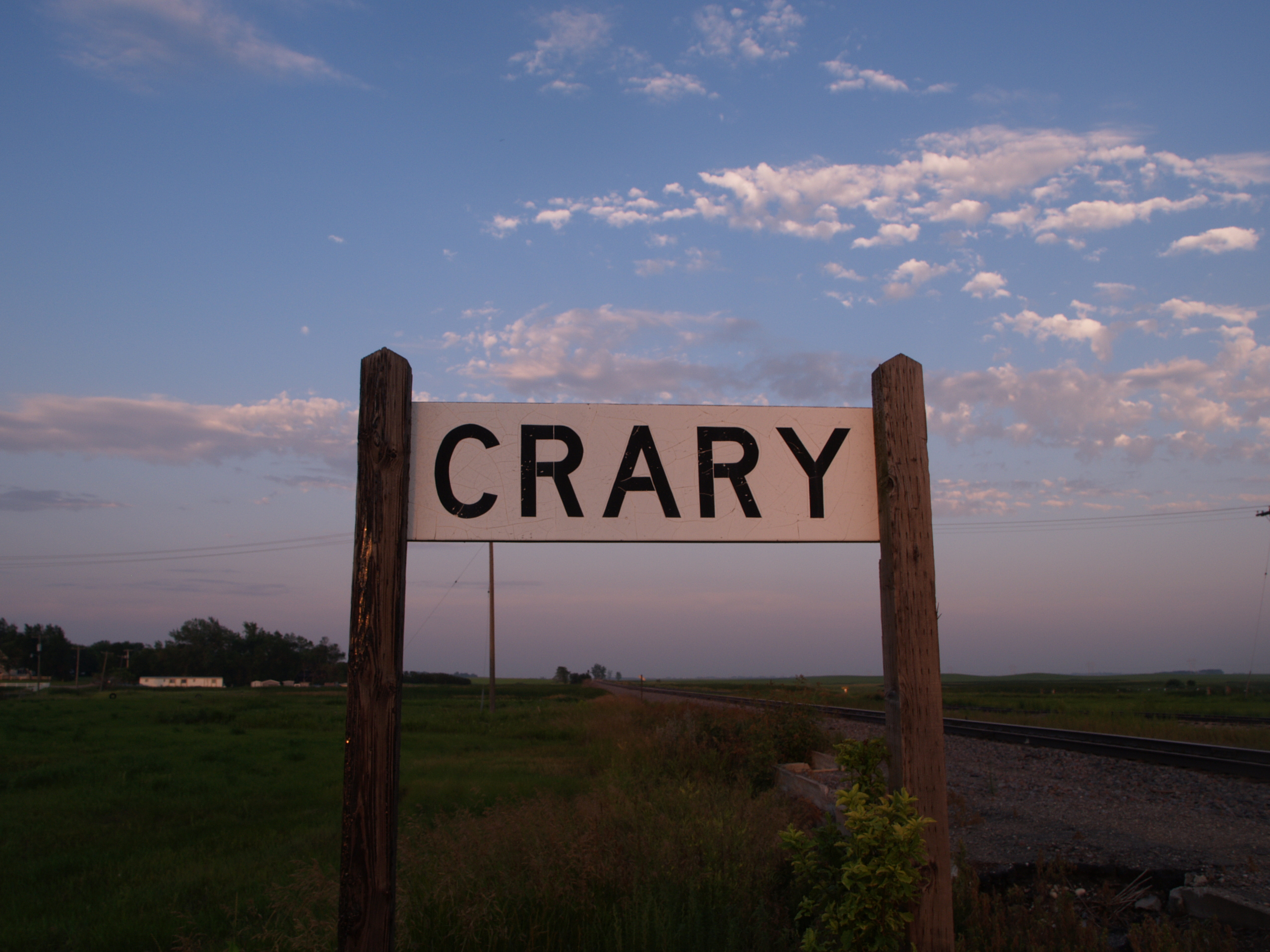
- Sign at Crary
- Interactive map of Crary, North Dakota
- Location within North Dakota Location within the United States
- Coordinates: 48.0750°N 98.6332°W
- Country: United States
- State: North Dakota
- County: Ramsey
- Founded: 1884
- Founder: William Crary

Area
  - Total: 1.001 sq mi (2.593 km^{2})
  - Land: 0.949 sq mi (2.459 km^{2})
  - Water: 0.052 sq mi (0.135 km^{2}) 5.19%
- Elevation: 1,486 ft (453 m)

Population (2020)
  - Total: 113
  - Estimate (2025): 112
  - Density: 119/sq mi (46.0/km^{2})
- Time zone: UTC–6 (Central (CST))
  - Summer (DST): UTC–5 (CDT)
- ZIP Code: 58327
- Area code: 701
- FIPS code: 38-16580
- GNIS feature ID: 1035980

Crary is a city in Ramsey County, North Dakota, United States. The population was 113 as of the 2020 census, and was estimated at 112 in 2025.

== History ==
Crary was founded in 1884 and is named after William Crary, who owned much of the land encompassing the present-day community.

== Geography ==
According to the United States Census Bureau, the city has a total area of 1.001 square miles (2.59 km^{2}), of which 0.949 square miles (2.46 km^{2}) is land and 0.052 square miles (0.13 km^{2}) (5.19%) is water.

== Demographics ==
Historical population
Census	Pop.	Note	%±
1910	279		—
1920	307		10.0%
1930	278		−9.4%
1940	267		−4.0%
1950	235		−12.0%
1960	195		−17.0%
1970	150		−23.1%
1980	139		−7.3%
1990	145		4.3%
2000	149		2.8%
2010	142		−4.7%
2020	113		−20.4%
2025 (est.)	112		−0.9%
U.S. Decennial Census; 2020 Census

=== 2020 census ===
As of the 2020 census, there were 113 people, 43 households, and 23 families residing in the city.

=== 2010 census ===
As of the 2010 census, there were 142 people, 45 households, and 38 families residing in the city. The population density was 159.6 inhabitants per square mile (61.6/km^{2}). There were 51 housing units at an average density of 57.3 per square mile (22.1/km^{2}). The racial makeup of the city was 95.1% White, 4.2% Native American, and 0.7% from two or more races. Hispanic or Latino of any race were 2.1% of the population.

There were 45 households, of which 48.9% had children under the age of 18 living with them, 57.8% were married couples living together, 8.9% had a female householder with no husband present, 17.8% had a male householder with no wife present, and 15.6% were non-families. 11.1% of all households were made up of individuals. The average household size was 3.16 and the average family size was 3.32.

The median age in the city was 32.5 years. 31.7% of residents were under the age of 18; 8.5% were between the ages of 18 and 24; 28% were from 25 to 44; 26.1% were from 45 to 64; and 5.6% were 65 years of age or older. The gender makeup of the city was 60.6% male and 39.4% female.

=== 2000 census ===
As of the 2000 census, there were 149 people, 47 households, and 42 families residing in the city. The population density was 169.6 inhabitants per square mile (65.5/km^{2}). There were 54 housing units at an average density of 61.5 per square mile (23.7/km^{2}). The racial makeup of the city was 96.64% White, 2.68% Native American, and 0.67% from two or more races.

There were 47 households, out of which 44.7% had children under the age of 18 living with them, 74.5% were married couples living together, 2.1% had a female householder with no husband present, and 10.6% were non-families. 6.4% of all households were made up of individuals, and none had someone living alone who was 65 years of age or older. The average household size was 3.17 and the average family size was 3.21.

In the city, the population was spread out, with 33.6% under the age of 18, 8.7% from 18 to 24, 30.9% from 25 to 44, 18.8% from 45 to 64, and 8.1% who were 65 years of age or older. The median age was 32 years. For every 100 females, there were 119.1 males. For every 100 females age 18 and over, there were 120.0 males.

The median income for a household in the city was $39,375, and the median income for a family was $43,125. Males had a median income of $21,250 versus $20,156 for females. The per capita income for the city was $13,084. There were 6.1% of families and 9.6% of the population living below the poverty line, including 18.9% of under eighteens and none of those over 64.

== Transportation ==
Amtrak’s Empire Builder, which operates between Seattle/Portland and Chicago, passes through the town on BNSF tracks, but makes no stop. The nearest station is located in Devils Lake, 13 miles (21 km) to the west.

== Education ==
Crary is in the Devils Lake Public Schools. Students are zoned to Devils Lake High School.
