= KDVL =

- Devils Lake, North Dakota; United States
- Broadcast area: Devils Lake-New Rockford
- Frequency: 102.5 MHz
- Branding: K-Devil FM

Programming
- Format: Classic hits
- Affiliations: FOX News Radio

Ownership
- Owner: Double Z Broadcasting, Inc.
- Sister stations: KDLR, KQZZ, KZZY

History
- First air date: January 1, 1967 (as KDLR-FM)
- Former call signs: KDLR-FM (1967–1978)
- Call sign meaning: DeVils Lake

Technical information
- Licensing authority: FCC
- Facility ID: 15271
- Class: C1
- ERP: 100,000 watts
- HAAT: 143 meters (469 feet)
- Transmitter coordinates: 47°59′16″N 98°55′59″W

Links
- Public license information: Public file; LMS
- Webcast: Listen Live
- Website: KDVL Online

KDVL (102.5 FM, "K-Devil FM") is an American commercial radio station licensed to serve Devils Lake, North Dakota. The station is owned by Double Z Broadcasting, Inc., and operated along with its three sister stations under the collective name Lake Region Radio Works. KDVL airs a classic hits music format, which covers mainly 1970s and 1980s, and some hits from the late 1960s and 1990s.

The station was assigned the KDVL call letters by the Federal Communications Commission on June 19, 1978.
