= Saint Michael, North Dakota =

- Unincorporated community
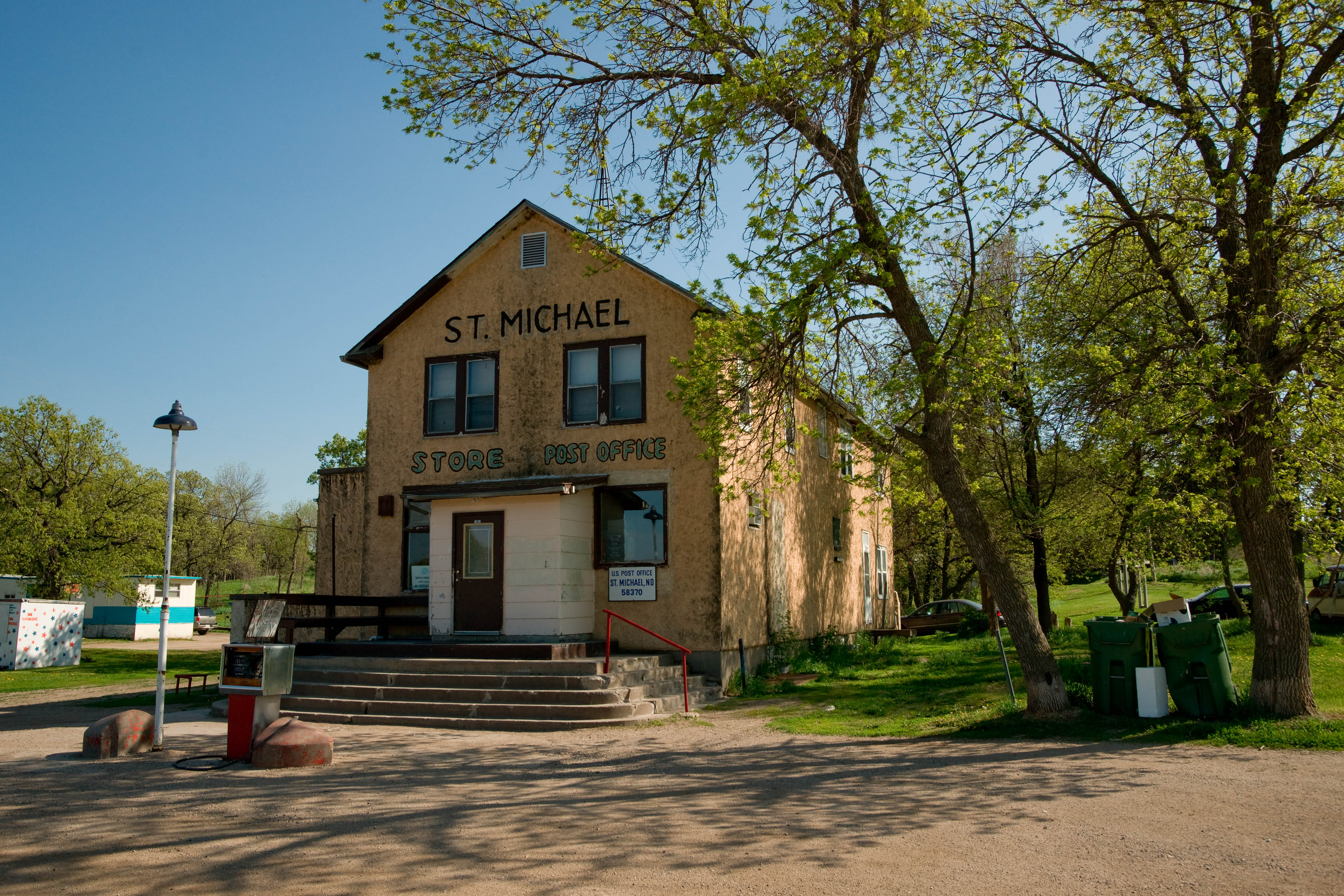
- The General Store and Post Office in Saint Michael

- Location within the state of North Dakota
- Coordinates: 47°59′06″N 98°52′19″W
- Country: United States
- State: North Dakota
- County: Benson
- Township: Mission Township
- Elevation: 1,483 ft (452 m)
- Time zone: UTC-6 (Central (CST))
  - Summer (DST): UTC-5 (CDT)
- ZIP Code: 58370
- Area code: 701
- FIPS code: 38-70140
- GNIS feature ID: 1031235

Saint Michael is an unincorporated community in southeastern Benson County, North Dakota, United States, on the Spirit Lake Dakota Reservation. It lies along North Dakota Highway 57 in Mission Township, southeast of the city of Minnewaukan, the county seat. It has a post office with the ZIP code 58370.

According to the 2000 Census, Saint Michael was located in census tract 9402, block group 1, and assigned blocks 1028 and 1029. The population of these census blocks was 15 and 12 people respectively.

== History ==
Saint Michael was named after the archangel Michael by a group of Catholic nuns who founded a mission in the area. A Dakota community, it lies within the boundaries of the Spirit Lake Reservation. European-Americans were reported to have settled in the area as early as 1874. A post office was opened in 1932, and continues in operation today.

== Notable person ==
- Constantine Scollen, the famous missionary priest, was resident at St Michael from early 1887 until 1890
