= Adjutant General of North Dakota =

Highest-ranking military official in North Dakota, US

The Adjutant General of North Dakota is the highest-ranking military official in the State of North Dakota and is subordinate to the Governor of North Dakota. The Adjutant General is a member of the Governor's Cabinet and advises the Governor on military and emergency management matters. The Adjutant General is in charge of the North Dakota Army National Guard, North Dakota Air National Guard, the North Dakota Department of Emergency Services (Homeland Security and State Radio), and the North Dakota Civil Air Patrol. The current Adjutant General of North Dakota is Brigadier General Mitchell R. Johnson.

The Adjutant General is appointed by the Governor for the duration of his or her term in office or at the pleasure of his or her successor.

== Adjutants General of Dakota Territory ==
	Name	Years in Office
1	Thomas S. Free	1884-1886
2	Noah N. Tyner	1886-1887
3	James E. Jenkins	1887-1888
4	James W. Harden	1888-1889
5	J.S. Huston	1889-1889

== Adjutants General of North Dakota ==
	Rank	Name	Years of Service	Army or Air Guard	Appointed By
1	Brigadier General	William Devoy	1889-1891	Army	Gov. John Miller
2	Brigadier General	William A. Bentley	1891-1893	Army	Gov. Andrew Burke
3	Brigadier General	W. H. Topping	1893-1895	Army	Gov. Eli Shortridge
4	Brigadier General	Elliot S. Miller	1895-1905	Army	Gov. Roger Allin
5	Brigadier General	Heber M. Creel	1905-1907	Army	Gov. Elmore Sarles
6	Major General	Thomas H. Poole	1907-1909	Army	Gov. John Burke
7	Major General	Amasa Peake	1909-1911	Army	Gov. John Burke
8	Major General	William C. Treumann	1911-1913	Army	Gov. John Burke
9	Major General	Invald A. "Ira" Berg	1913-1915	Army	Gov. Louis Hanna
10	Major General	Thomas Tharalson	1915-1917	Army	Gov. Louis Hanna
11	Brigadier General	G. A. Fraser	1917-1933	Army	Gov. Louis Hanna
Acting	Captain	Herman A. Brocopp	1933	Army	
12	Brigadier General	Earle R. Sarles	1933-1935	Army	Gov. William Langer
13	Brigadier General	Frayne Baker	1935-1937	Army	Gov. Thomas Moodie
14	Major General	Heber L. Edwards	1937-1962	Army	Gov. William Langer
15	Major General	LaClair A. Melhouse	1962-1975	Army	Gov. William L. Guy
16	Major General	C. Emerson Murray	1975-1984	Army	Gov. Art Link
17	Major General	Alexander P. Macdonald	1984-1993	Air	Gov. Allen Olson
18	Major General	Keith D. Bjerke	1993-2000	Air	Gov. Ed Schafer
19	Major General	Michael J. Haugen	2000-2006	Air	Gov. John Hoeven
20	Major General	David A. Sprynczynatyk	2006-2015	Army	Gov. John Hoeven
21	Major General	Alan S. Dohrmann	2015-2024	Army	Gov. Jack Dalrymple
22	Brigadier General	Mitchell R. Johnson	2024- Current	Air	Gov. Doug Burgum
