= Thiaucourt-Regniéville =

- Commune
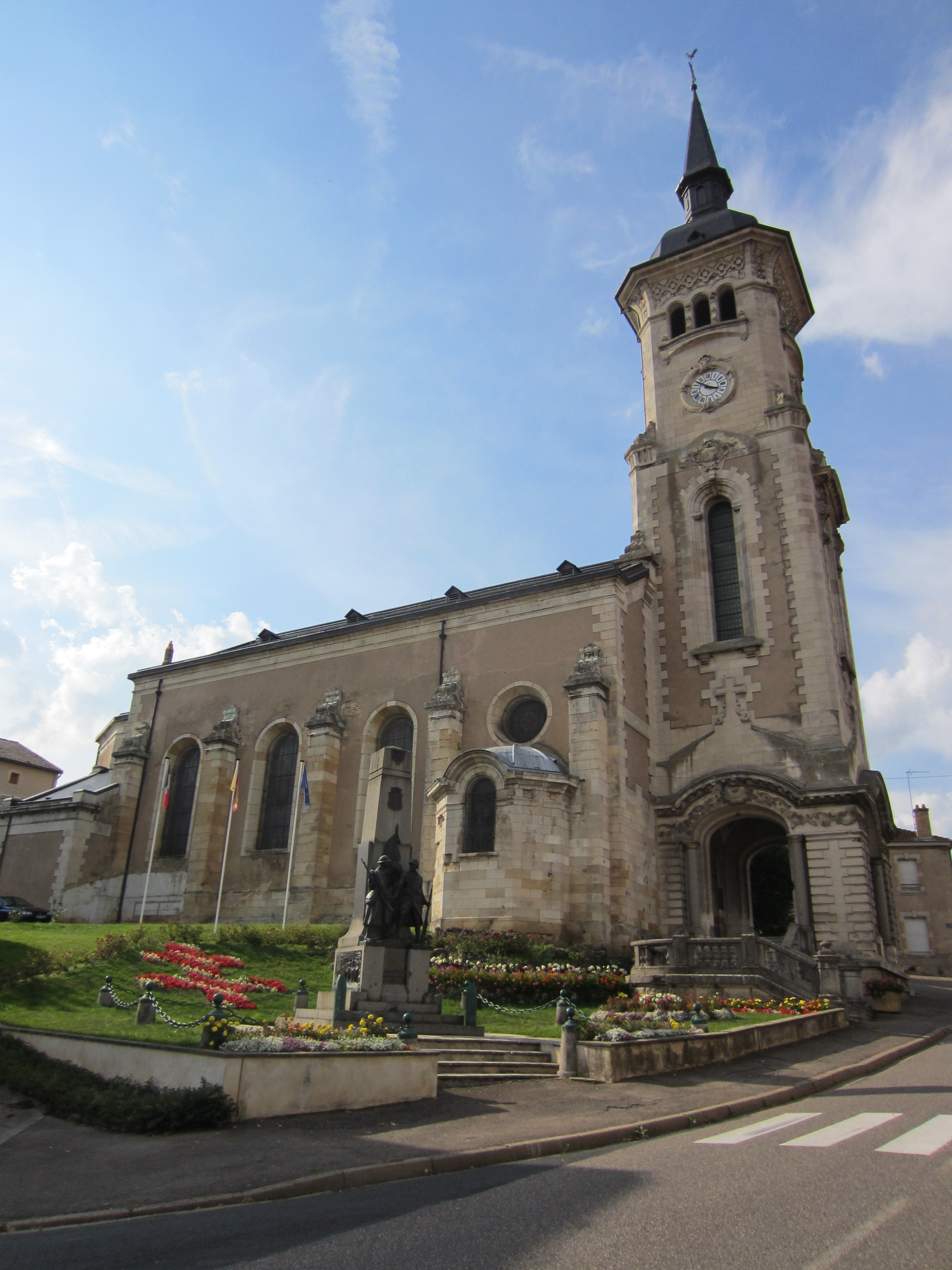
- Church of Saint-Rémi

- Coat of arms
- Location of Thiaucourt-Regniéville
- Location within France Location within Grand Est
- Coordinates: 48°57′18″N 5°52′01″E
- Country: France
- Region: Grand Est
- Department: Meurthe-et-Moselle
- Arrondissement: Toul
- Canton: Le Nord-Toulois
- Intercommunality: Mad et Moselle

Government
  - Mayor (2020–2026): Margaret Dumont
- Area^{1}: 19.01 km^{2} (7.34 sq mi)
- Elevation: 215 m (705 ft)
- Highest elevation: 347 m (1,138 ft)
- Lowest elevation: 202 m (663 ft)
- Population (2023): 1,120
  - Density: 58.9/km^{2} (153/sq mi)
- Time zone: UTC+01:00 (CET)
  - Summer (DST): UTC+02:00 (CEST)
- INSEE/Postal code: 54518 /54470
- ^{1} French Land Register data, which excludes lakes, ponds, glaciers > 1 km^{2} (0.386 sq mi or 247 acres) and river estuaries.

Thiaucourt-Regniéville (French pronunciation: [tjokuʁ ʁəɲevil]) is a commune in the Meurthe-et-Moselle department in north-eastern France.

== Geography ==
The Rupt de Mad flows northeastward through the north-western part of the commune and crosses the village.

== Sights ==
- The St. Mihiel American Cemetery and Memorial
- The German war cemetery, where rest more than 11,000 German soldiers from World War I and some French soldiers.

== See also ==
- Communes of the Meurthe-et-Moselle department
- Parc naturel régional de Lorraine
