= Devils Lake Public Schools =

School district in North Dakota, United States

Devils Lake Public School District 1, also known as Devils Lake Public Schools, is a school district serving Devils Lake, North Dakota.

In Ramsey County the district serves Devils Lake and Crary. It also includes a section of Benson County.

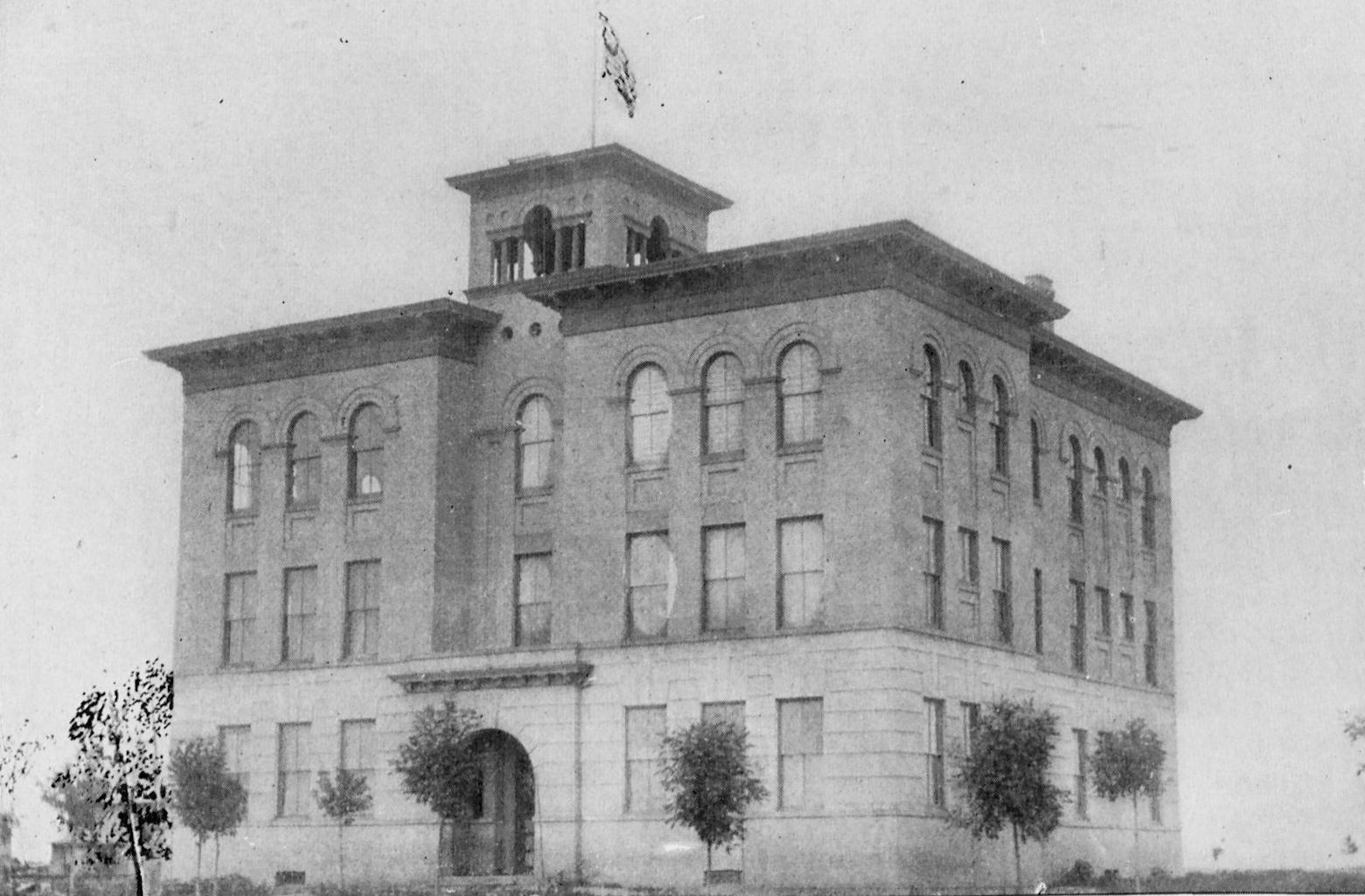
Public school building in Devils Lake, N.D., 1898

== Schools ==
- Devils Lake High School
- Lake Area Career & Technology Center
- Central Middle School
- Minnie H Elementary
- Prairie View Elementary
- Sweetwater Elementary
