= Camp Grafton =

US Army National Guard installation in North Dakota

Coordinates: 48°03′25″N 98°55′15″W

Camp Grafton is the main Army National Guard installation in North Dakota. The base, located near Devils Lake, North Dakota, was founded in 1904 as the Rock Island Military Reservation. In 1924, it was renamed after Lieutenant Colonel Gilbert C. Grafton, a prominent North Dakota National Guardsman who had served in the militia since the days of Dakota Territory, and died of disease in 1919. The name change was made official by executive order of the governor of North Dakota in 1952.

== History ==
Camp Grafton of the North Dakota Army National Guard in Devils Lake, North Dakota is an ARNG Major Training Center. In 1904 some 1,500 acres (6.1 km^{2}) near Devils Lake was ceded to the State of North Dakota by the federal government for use as a permanent military reservation for the North Dakota National Guard. Before its present name, the camp was also known as Camp Henry W. Lawton and the Rock Island Military Reservation.

== Geography ==
Devils Lake, the largest natural body of water in North Dakota, has been getting larger every year since 1993, much to the frustration of area residents. Rising water threatens to flood the city of Devils Lake, Camp Grafton, roads, fields, sewage treatment plants, and other human facilities. Devils Lake has a long history of fluctuating water levels. Water levels have risen over 16 feet (4.9 m), flooding pasture, farmland, homes, businesses, and roads. The fluctuating water level of Devils Lake has been a concern to area residents for a number of years. In 1983, then Governor Olson issued a Disaster Emergency Proclamation for the area due to the damage to roads and property caused by flooding (Bluemle, 1983). A drought that began in 1988 caused the lake level to decline again.

== Camp Grafton (South) ==
In 1983 the North Dakota National Guard received funding from the state legislature to purchase land in Eddy County. Today the "new" training area is known as Camp Grafton South. In 1997 the training facility located at Camp Grafton (South) was designated as the Major General C. Emerson Murry regional live fire and maneuver training center, though it remained a part of the overall Camp Grafton training complex. Major General C. Emerson Murry served in the North Dakota National Guard from 1955 to 1984, being adjutant general of the North Dakota National Guard from 1975 to 1984.

Camp Grafton (South Unit) (CGS) consists of 10,000 acres (40 km^{2}) of a transitional grassland ecosystem. Transitional grasslands contain both tall grass prairies of the east and mixed grass prairies of the west. CGS is one of the largest contiguous areas of transitional grasslands North Dakota. Grazing has been the predominant use of the training area since 1920. Cattle grazing mimics the prehistoric grazing by herbivores (elk and bison). The rolling hills of transitional grasslands are a tremendous training area for open-area combat arms maneuvers necessary for our mechanized engineer and air defense artillery units. To maintain the transitional grassland ecosystem, grazing licenses are auctioned to local ranchers; providing income, which is, reinvested back into the training site. The transitional grassland ecosystem is seriously threatened by leafy spurge (Euphorbia esula), an introduced weed. The primary control in the past has been concentrated use of 2,4-D and picloram herbicides. In the past five years, the North Dakota Army National Guard, in partnership with the Range Science Department of North Dakota State University has implemented an integrated pest management plan to control leafy spurge using cultural and chemical controls. The cultural controls consist of grazing spurge tolerant sheep on heavily infested sites, and treating small concentrations through chemical application. The NDARNG is expected to reduce herbicide costs by 79% over the next six years, with a realization of increased grass production of 50%. The USDA in other trials throughout the United States is implementing this integrated plan of combined cultural and chemical treatment.
