= Devils Lake, North Dakota =

- City
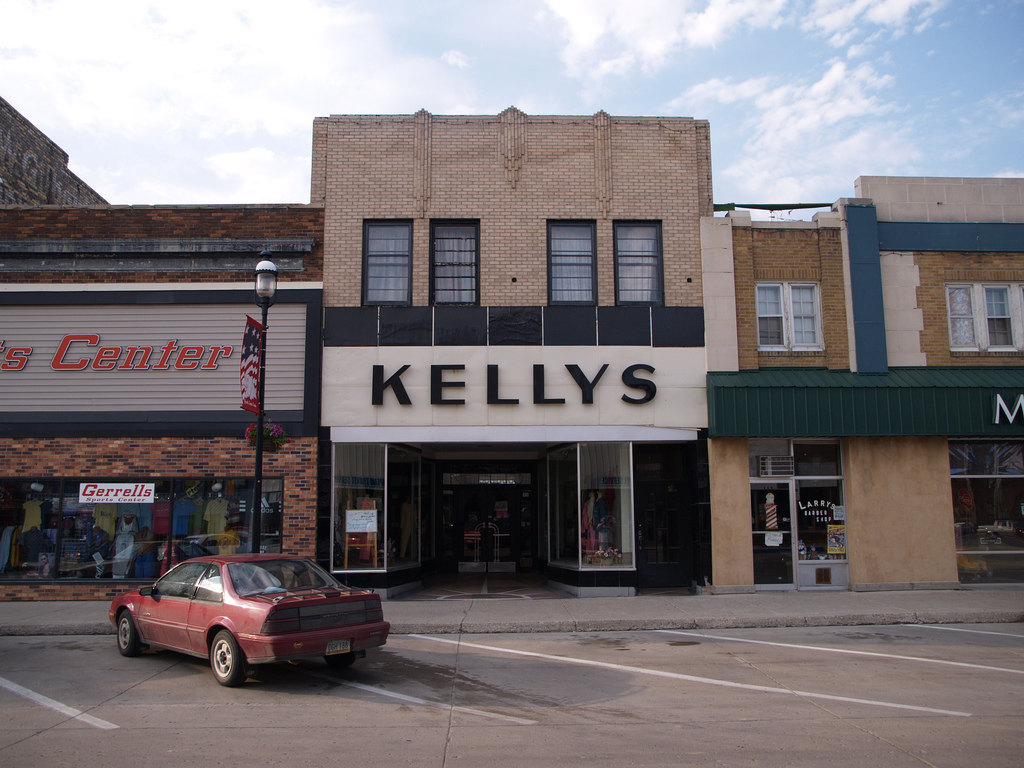
- Downtown Devils Lake

- Seal Logo
- Interactive map of Devils Lake, North Dakota
- Location within North Dakota Location within the United States
- Coordinates: 48.1126°N 98.8748°W
- Country: United States
- State: North Dakota
- County: Ramsey
- Founded: 1882
- Incorporated (village): 1884
- Incorporated (city): 1887

Government
  - Mayor: Jim Moe
  - Vice President: Rob Hach
  - Commissioner: Joe Knowski; Jason Pierce; Lisa Uhlenkamp

Area
  - City: 6.965 sq mi (18.039 km^{2})
  - Land: 6.959 sq mi (18.023 km^{2})
  - Water: 0.0058 sq mi (0.015 km^{2}) 0.09%
- Elevation: 1,437 ft (438 m)

Population (2020)
  - City: 7,192
  - Estimate (2025): 7,333
  - Density: 1,034/sq mi (399.0/km^{2})
  - Urban: 7,493
  - Metro: 11,530
- Time zone: UTC–6 (Central (CST))
  - Summer (DST): UTC–5 (CDT)
- ZIP Code: 58301
- Area code: 701
- FIPS code: 38-19420
- GNIS feature ID: 1035989
- Highways: US 2, ND 19, ND 20
- Website: www.dvlnd.com

Devils Lake is a city in and the county seat of Ramsey County, North Dakota, United States. The population was 7,192 as of the 2020 census and was estimated at 7,333 in 2025. It is named after the nearby lake called Devils Lake. The first house built by a Euro-American settler was in 1882. It was surveyed in 1883 and named Creelsburg and later Creel City, after the surveyor, Heber M. Creel. In 1884 it was renamed Devils Lake.

The local paper is the Devils Lake Journal. Devils Lake Regional Airport serves the city. Devils Lake is home to Lake Region State College and the North Dakota School for the Deaf.

== History ==
The present site of Devils Lake was, historically, a territory of the Dakota people. However, the Sisseton, Wahpeton, and Cut-Head bands of the Dakotas were relocated to the Spirit Lake Reservation as a result of the 1867 treaty between the United States and the Dakota that established a reservation for those who had not been forcibly relocated to Crow Creek Reservation in what is now South Dakota. The name "Devils Lake" is a calque of the Dakota phrase mni wak’áŋ (literally translating to spirit water), which is also reflected in the names of the Spirit Lake Tribe and the nearby town of Minnewaukan.

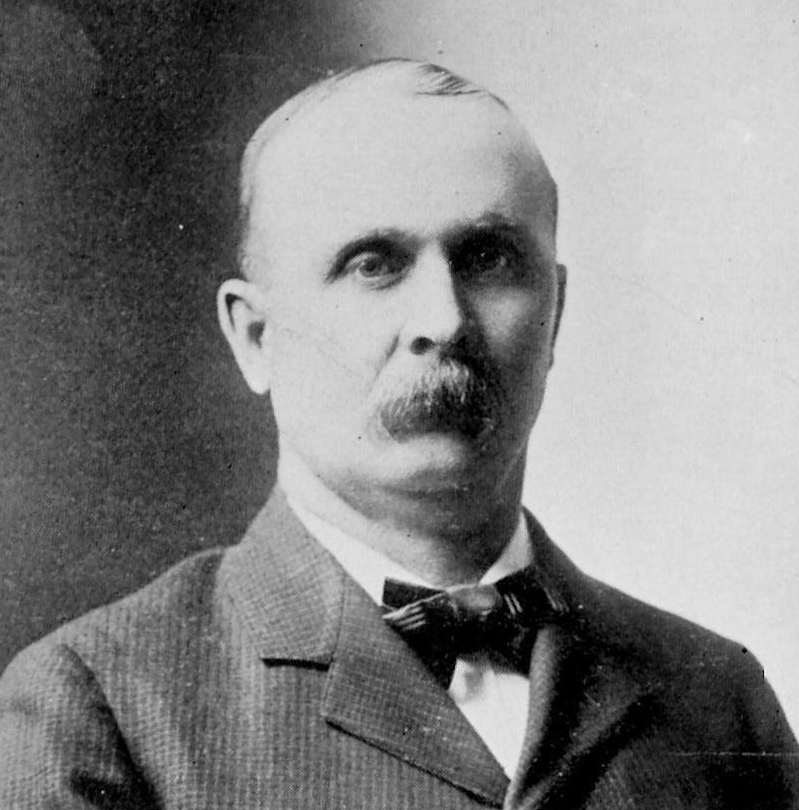
Portrait of Heber M. Creel, c. 1898

The Dakota called the lake mni wak’áŋ, which separately translates as mni (water) and wak’áŋ (literally meaning "pure source" but often translated as "spirit" or "sacred"). The European-American settlers misconstrued this name to mean "Bad Spirit Lake" or "Devils Lake." The "bad" referred to the high salinity of the lake, making it unfit to drink, and "spirit" referenced the mirages often seen across the water. The Christian concept of the devil was not present in the Dakota philosophy and religious practices.

The Hidatsa name for the lake is mirixubaash ( meaning "sacred water").

The first post office was founded November 15, 1882, and was originally named Creelsburg. It was founded by Lieutenant Heber M. Creel, a West Point graduate and topographical engineer stationed at nearby Fort Totten. After resigning from the U.S. Army, he surveyed the land and established the townsite.

The surrounding Creel Township is named for Mr. Creel. The name was later changed to Creel City and expanded by the Great Northern Railway. When the village was incorporated in 1884, the name was changed to City of Devils Lake and then shortened to Devils Lake.

During a period of increased rainfall, beginning in the 1990s and unprecedented in the history of North Dakota, caused the nearby lake, which has no natural outlet, to rise. The surface area has quadrupled, and the higher water has resulted in the moving or destruction of over 400 houses.

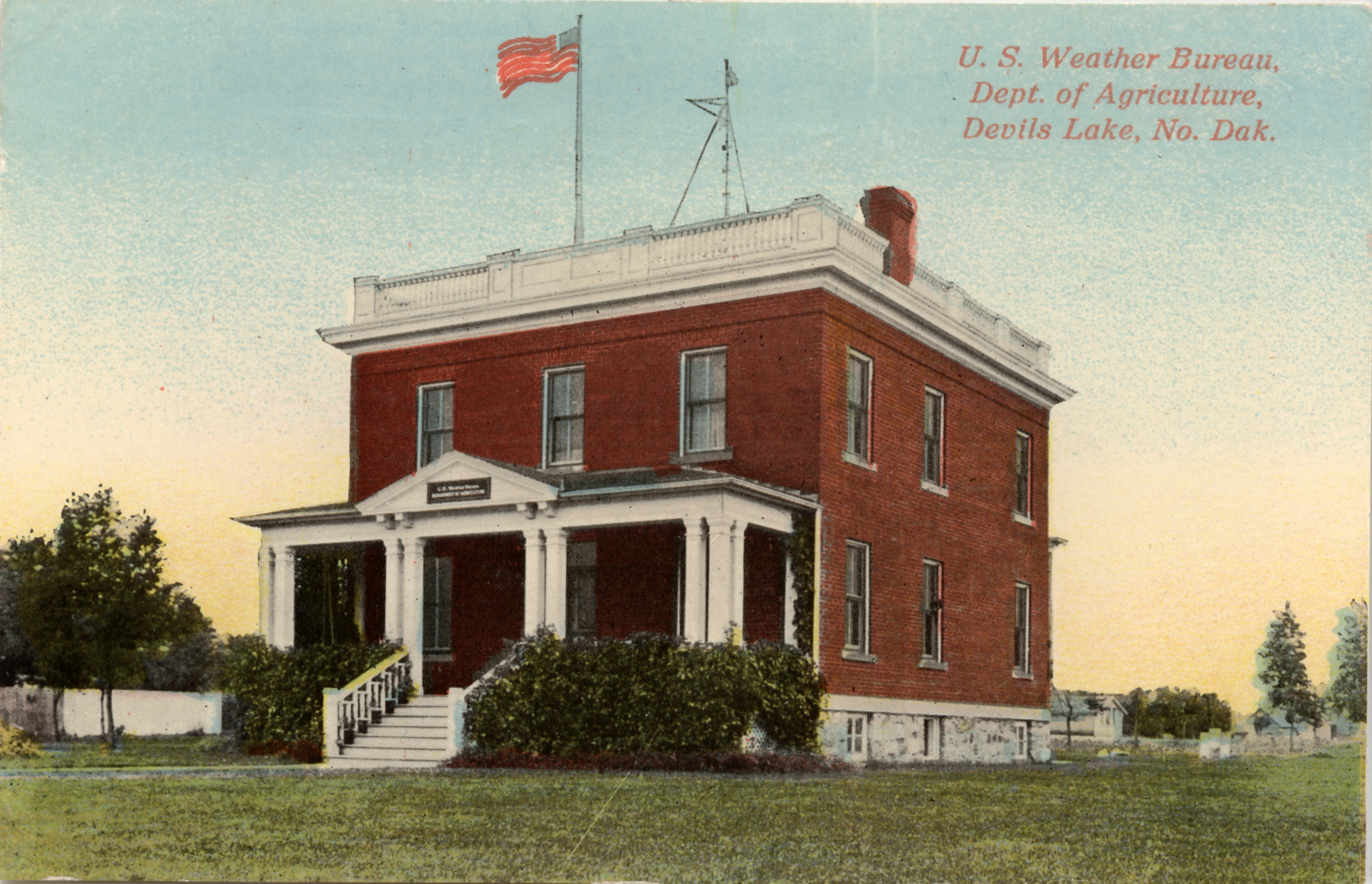
Weather Bureau building c. 1900

== Geography and climate ==
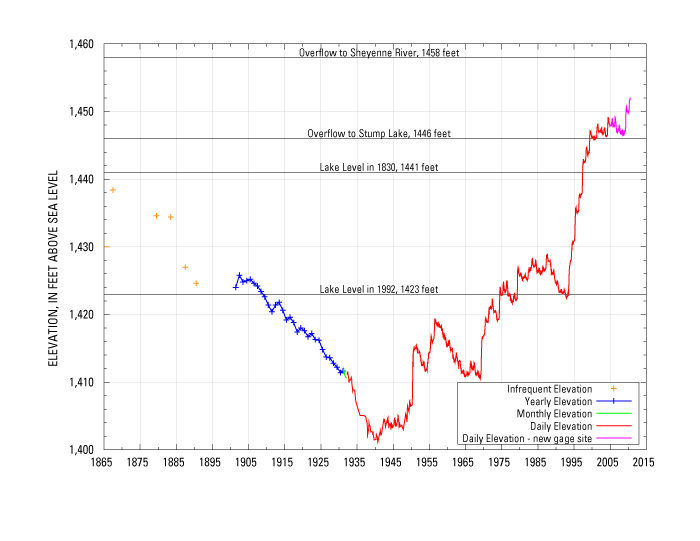
Hydrograph Illustrating rising waters over the 1900–2015 time period.

According to the United States Census Bureau, the city has a total area of 6.965 square miles (18.04 km^{2}), of which 6.959 square miles (18.02 km^{2}) is land and 0.006 square miles (0.016 km^{2}) (0.09%) is water.

Like all of North Dakota, Devils Lake has a humid continental climate (Köppen Dfb) with very cold winters with frequent light snowfall, and warm to very warm, wetter summers with most rain from convective thunderstorms. During the 1936 North American cold wave, the town was one of the coldest places south of the Canada–US border, averaging −21 °F or −29.4 °C for the five weeks ending February 21, 1936 (though at a different site from that now in use). On average 53.4 nights fall to or below 0 °F or −17.8 °C, 104.1 days fail to top freezing, and 184.5 nights fall below 32 °F or 0 °C. In the winter, only 17.5 days on average top freezing, and in severe winters months can pass without even a minor thaw. Extreme heat is rare in summer, with only one day in three years topping 100 °F or 37.8 °C, and only 9.3 topping 90 °F or 32.2 °C.

Climate data for Devils Lake, North Dakota (1971–2000, extremes 1948–2001)
Month	Jan	Feb	Mar	Apr	May	Jun	Jul	Aug	Sep	Oct	Nov	Dec	Year
Record high °F (°C)	53 (12)	60 (16)	72 (22)	97 (36)	96 (36)	103 (39)	103 (39)	103 (39)	100 (38)	94 (34)	77 (25)	59 (15)	103 (39)
Mean daily maximum °F (°C)	14.7 (−9.6)	22.3 (−5.4)	33.6 (0.9)	52.1 (11.2)	67.5 (19.7)	75.3 (24.1)	80.1 (26.7)	79.1 (26.2)	67.7 (19.8)	53.9 (12.2)	33.1 (0.6)	19.4 (−7.0)	49.9 (9.9)
Mean daily minimum °F (°C)	−2.5 (−19.2)	5.2 (−14.9)	17.3 (−8.2)	32.2 (0.1)	44.9 (7.2)	54.3 (12.4)	58.6 (14.8)	56.2 (13.4)	46.5 (8.1)	34.6 (1.4)	18.4 (−7.6)	3.6 (−15.8)	30.8 (−0.7)
Record low °F (°C)	−36 (−38)	−37 (−38)	−28 (−33)	−12 (−24)	1 (−17)	29 (−2)	39 (4)	33 (1)	20 (−7)	−2 (−19)	−25 (−32)	−37 (−38)	−37 (−38)
Average precipitation inches (mm)	0.58 (15)	0.51 (13)	0.80 (20)	0.90 (23)	2.14 (54)	3.83 (97)	3.29 (84)	2.21 (56)	1.80 (46)	1.47 (37)	0.83 (21)	0.57 (14)	18.93 (480)
Average snowfall inches (cm)	6.3 (16)	4.7 (12)	6.3 (16)	2.2 (5.6)	0.3 (0.76)	0.0 (0.0)	0.0 (0.0)	0.0 (0.0)	0.0 (0.0)	1.9 (4.8)	5.4 (14)	7.2 (18)	34.3 (87.16)
Average precipitation days (≥ 0.01 inch)	8.4	6.7	7.2	7.1	9.5	12.1	10.1	8.9	8.4	7.3	6.8	7.4	99.9
Average snowy days (≥ 0.1 inch)	6.2	3.7	3.8	1.1	0.1	0.0	0.0	0.0	0.1	0.7	3.1	4.8	23.6
Source: NOAA

== Demographics ==
Historical population
Census	Pop.	Note	%±
1890	846		—
1900	1,729		104.4%
1910	5,157		198.3%
1920	5,140		−0.3%
1930	5,451		6.1%
1940	6,204		13.8%
1950	6,427		3.6%
1960	6,299		−2.0%
1970	7,078		12.4%
1980	7,442		5.1%
1990	7,782		4.6%
2000	7,222		−7.2%
2010	7,141		−1.1%
2020	7,192		0.7%
2025 (est.)	7,333		2.0%
U.S. Decennial Census; 2020 Census

According to realtor website Zillow, the average price of a home as of May 31, 2026, in Devils Lake was $244,812.

As of the 2024 American Community Survey, there were 3,747 estimated households in Devils Lake with an average of 1.83 persons per household. The city has a median household income of $43,220. Approximately 21.8% of the city's population lives at or below the poverty line. Devils Lake has an estimated 66.7% employment rate, with 21.9% of the population holding a bachelor's degree or higher and 91.9% holding a high school diploma. There were 3,876 housing units at an average density of 556.98 per square mile (215.1/km^{2}).

The top five reported languages (people were allowed to report up to two languages, thus the figures will generally add to more than 100%) were English (95.1%), Spanish (0.4%), Indo-European (0.6%), Asian and Pacific Islander (1.3%), and Other (2.6%).

The median age in the city was 37.3 years.

Devils Lake, North Dakota – racial and ethnic composition Note: the US Census treats Hispanic/Latino as an ethnic category. This table excludes Latinos from the racial categories and assigns them to a separate category. Hispanics/Latinos may be of any race.
Race / ethnicity (NH = non-Hispanic)	Pop. 1980	Pop. 1990	Pop. 2000	Pop. 2010	Pop. 2020
White alone (NH)	7,107 (95.50)	7,180 (92.26%)	6,426 (88.98%)	5,879 (82.33%)	5,331 (74.12%)
Black or African American alone (NH)	14 (0.19%)	17 (0.22%)	16 (0.22%)	37 (0.52%)	58 (0.81%)
Native American or Alaska Native alone (NH)	281 (3.78%)	524 (6.73%)	562 (7.78%)	868 (12.16%)	1,148 (15.96%)
Asian alone (NH)	13 (0.17%)	21 (0.27%)	20 (0.28%)	30 (0.42%)	55 (0.76%)
Pacific Islander alone (NH)	—	—	0 (0.00%)	2 (0.03%)	6 (0.08%)
Other race alone (NH)	0 (0.00%)	4 (0.05%)	3 (0.04%)	4 (0.06%)	2 (0.03%)
Mixed race or multiracial (NH)	—	—	155 (2.15%)	225 (3.15%)	395 (5.49%)
Hispanic or Latino (any race)	27 (0.36%)	36 (0.46%)	40 (0.55%)	96 (1.34%)	197 (2.74%)
Total	7,442 (100.00%)	7,782 (100.00%)	7,222 (100.00%)	7,141 (100.00%)	7,192 (100.00%)

=== 2020 census ===
As of the 2020 census, there were 7,192 people, 3,202 households, and 1,612 families residing in the city. The population density was 1,033.48 inhabitants per square mile (399.0/km^{2}). There were 3,687 housing units at an average density of 529.82 per square mile (204.6/km^{2}). The racial makeup of the city was 75.00% White, 0.81% African American, 16.59% Native American, 0.76% Asian, 0.08% Pacific Islander, 0.57% from some other races and 6.19% from two or more races. Hispanic or Latino people of any race were 2.74% of the population.

There were 3,202 households out of which 25.8% had children under the age of 18 living with them, 33.0% were married couples living together, 32.6% had a female householder with no husband present, and _% were non-families. 42.5% of all households were made up of individuals and 17.8% had someone living alone who was 65 years of age or older. The average household size was 2._ and the average family size was 2._.

In the city the population was spread out with _% under the age of 18, _% from 18 to 24, _% from 25 to 44, _% from 45 to 64, and _% who were 65 years of age or older. The median age was 37.8 years. For every 100 females there were 95.5 males. For every 100 females age 18 and over, there were 94.1 males.

The median income for a household in the city was $_, and the median income for a family was $_. Males had a median income of $_ versus $_ for females. The per capita income for the city was $_. _% of the population and _% of families were below the poverty line. Out of the total people living in poverty, 24.1% were under the age of 18 and 20.7% were 65 or older.

99.3% of residents lived in urban areas, while 0.7% lived in rural areas.

25.1% were households with a male householder and no spouse or partner present.

There were 3,687 housing units, of which 13.2% were vacant. The homeowner vacancy rate was 2.5% and the rental vacancy rate was 13.8%.

=== 2010 census ===
As of the 2010 census, there were 7,141 people, 3,229 households, and 1,712 families residing in the city. The population density was 1,097.9 inhabitants per square mile (423.9/km^{2}). There were 3,481 housing units at an average density of 535.54 per square mile (206.8/km^{2}). The racial makeup of the city was 82.86% White, 0.52% African American, 12.53% Native American, 0.42% Asian, 0.03% Pacific Islander, 0.25% from some other races and 3.39% from two or more races. Hispanic or Latino people of any race were 1.34% of the population.

There were 3,229 households, of which 26.0% had children under the age of 18 living with them, 36.0% were married couples living together, 12.7% had a female householder with no husband present, 4.3% had a male householder with no wife present, and 47.0% were non-families. 41.8% of all households were made up of individuals, and 17.3% had someone living alone who was 65 years of age or older. The average household size was 2.07 and the average family size was 2.80.

The median age in the city was 40.4 years. 21.6% of residents were under the age of 18; 10.9% were between the ages of 18 and 24; 22.3% were from 25 to 44; 26.1% were from 45 to 64; and 19.2% were 65 years of age or older. The gender makeup of the city was 48.1% male and 51.9% female.

=== 2000 census ===
As of the 2000 census, there were 7,222 people, 3,127 households, and 1,773 families residing in the city. The population density was 1,149.4 inhabitants per square mile (443.8/km^{2}). There were 3,508 housing units at an average density of 558.3 per square mile (215.6/km^{2}). The racial makeup of the city was 89.23% White, 0.22% African American, 7.84% Native American, 0.28% Asian, 0.00% Pacific Islander, 0.21% from some other races and 2.23% from two or more races. Hispanic or Latino people of any race were 0.55% of the population.

The top 6 ancestry groups in the city are German (43.9%), Norwegian (33.4%), Irish (7.6%), French (4.7%), Swedish (4.5%), English (2.7%).

There were 3,127 households, out of which 27.5% had children under the age of 18 living with them, 41.2% were married couples living together, 11.3% had a female householder with no husband present, and 43.3% were non-families. 37.7% of all households were made up of individuals, and 18.0% had someone living alone who was 65 years of age or older. The average household size was 2.18 and the average family size was 2.87.

In the city, the population was spread out, with 24.0% under the age of 18, 10.0% from 18 to 24, 25.6% from 25 to 44, 19.3% from 45 to 64, and 21.1% who were 65 years of age or older. The median age was 38 years. For every 100 females, there were 89.8 males. For every 100 females age 18 and over, there were 85.0 males.

The median income for a household in the city was $31,250, and the median income for a family was $39,541. Males had a median income of $27,972 versus $18,000 for females. The per capita income for the city was $17,741. About 11.2% of families and 16.1% of the population were below the poverty line, including 22.7% of those under age 18 and 8.6% of those age 65 or over.

== Education ==
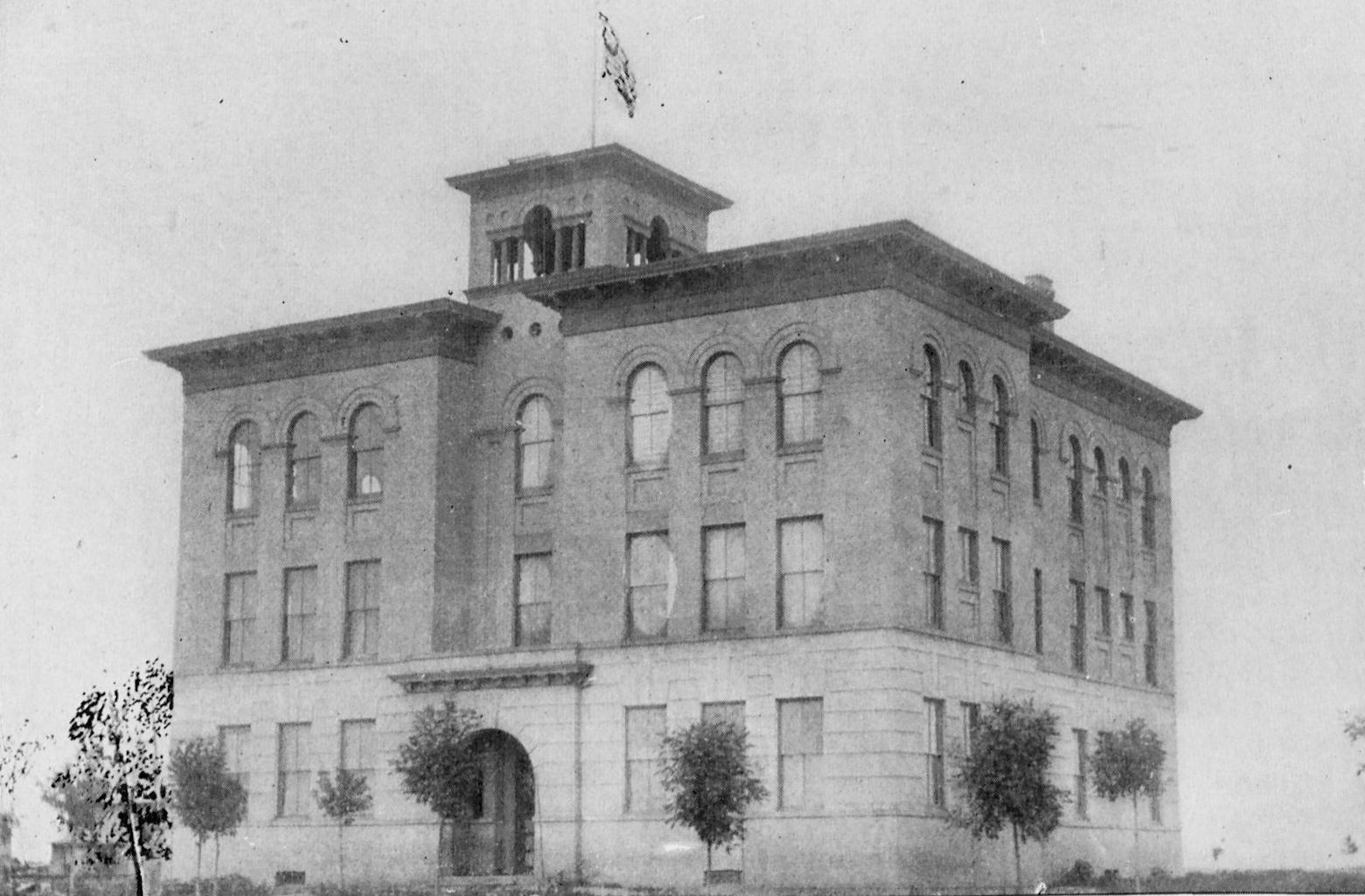
Public school building in Devils Lake, N.D., 1898

=== K–12 ===
The city of Devils Lake is served by Devils Lake Public Schools. This system operates Sweetwater Elementary School, Prairie View Elementary School, Minnie H Elementary School, Central Middle School, and Devils Lake High School.

A private school, St. Joseph's Catholic School (of the Roman Catholic Diocese of Fargo), is also located in Devils Lake.

=== Higher education ===
- Lake Region State College

== Sports ==
- Devils Lake Storm of North Dakota American Legion Baseball
- Devils Lake Firebirds
- Lake Region State College Royals – NJCAA

== Media ==
=== Print ===
- Devils Lake Journal

=== Television ===
- 8 WDAZ (8.1 ABC, 8.2 The CW, 8.3 Weather) – digital only – licensed to Devils Lake with news bureau in Grand Forks, but based at WDAY-TV in Fargo
- 25 KMDE (25.1 & 25.2 PBS/Prairie Public Television, 25.3 Minnesota Channel) – digital only

=== Radio ===
FM

- 89.9 KDVI American Family Radio (Christian)
- 90.7 KABU (Tribal radio – Spirit Lake Indian Reservation)
- 91.7 KPPD Prairie Public Radio/NPR (Public/Classical/Jazz)
- 95.3 KKWZ (owned by De La Hunt Broadcasting)
- 96.7 KQZZ "The Mix" (Hot Adult Contemporary)
- 99.7 KDLR (Classic country)
- 102.5 KDVL "Cruiser 102" (Classic Hits)
- 103.5 KZZY "Double Z Country" (Country)
- 104.5 K283AM broadcast translator of KHRT-FM of Minot, ND (contemporary Christian music)

== Transportation ==
Amtrak, the U.S. national passenger rail system, serves Devils Lake, operating its Empire Builder daily in both directions between Chicago and Seattle and Portland, Oregon. SkyWest Air Lines also operates two flights daily to the Devils Lake Regional Airport from Denver International Airport.

Local dial-a-ride transit service is provided by Devils Lake Transit. The service operates 7:35am to 5:00pm on weekdays for a standard fare of $3.00.

== Sites of interest ==
- Devils Lake Town and Country Club
- Devils Lake Basin Joint Water Resource Board http://www.dlbasin.com

== Notable people ==
- Phyllis Frelich, Tony Award-winning deaf actress
- William L. Guy, governor of North Dakota
- Rick Helling, pitcher with several Major League Baseball teams
- Cynthia Lindquist, Dakota academic administrator
- Tim Mahoney, mayor of Fargo
- Ralph Maxwell, North Dakota state court judge and athlete
- Grant Nelson, basketball player for the Brooklyn Nets
- Mary Wakefield, Administrator of Health Resources and Services Administration
- Owen Webster, organic and polymer chemist
