= North Dakota National Guard =

Component of the US Army and military

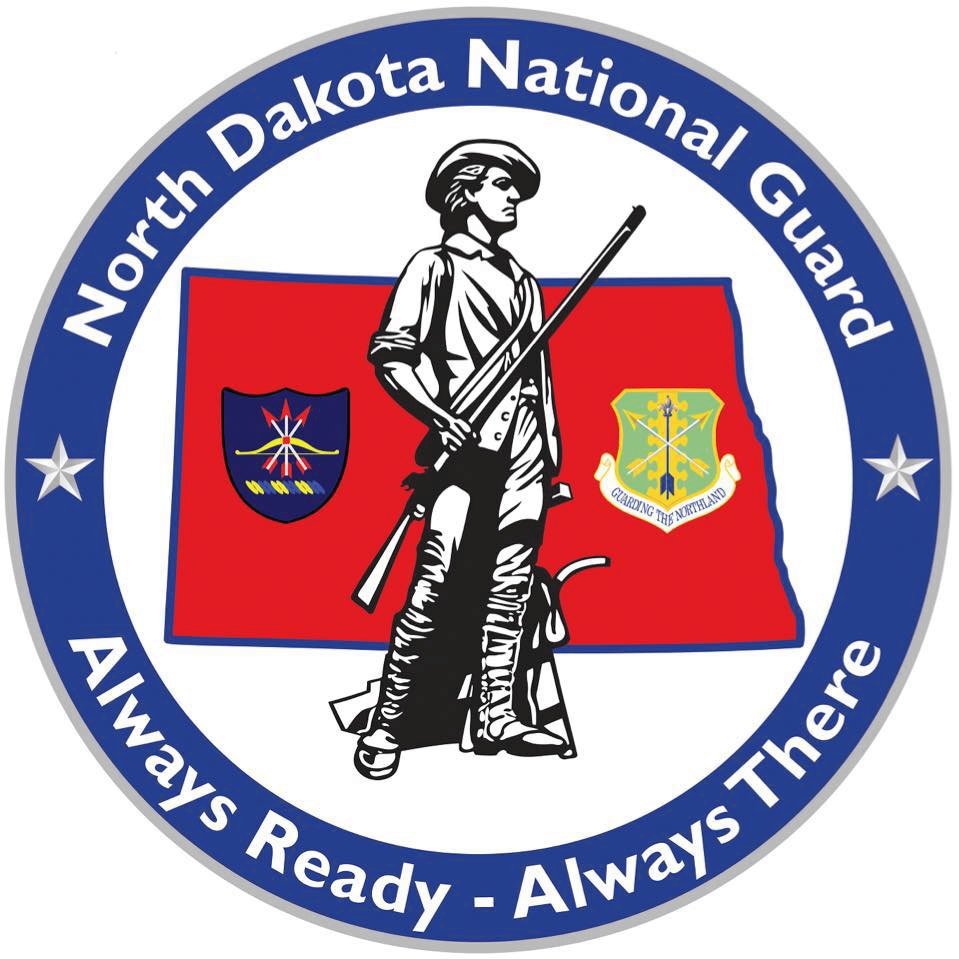
Logo

The North Dakota National Guard consists of the:

- North Dakota Army National Guard
- North Dakota Air National Guard

It is part of the North Dakota Office of the Adjutant General. The North Dakota Department of Emergency Services and North Dakota Wing Civil Air Patrol also fall under the Office of the Adjutant General.
