= U.S. Route 281 in North Dakota =

Section of U.S. Numbered Highway in North Dakota, United States

U.S. Highway 281
- American Legion Memorial Highway
- US 281 highlighted in red

Route information
- Maintained by NDDOT
- Length: 267.190 mi (430.001 km)
- Existed: 1926–present

Major junctions
- South end: US 281 at the South Dakota line near Ellendale
- I-94 / US 52 in Jamestown; US 52 / ND 200 in Carrington; US 2 in Churchs Ferry; ND 5 from Rock Lake to Dunseith
- North end: ND 3 / PTH 10 at the Canadian border at the International Peace Garden

Location
- Country: United States
- State: North Dakota
- Counties: Dickey, LaMoure, Stutsman, Foster, Eddy, Benson, Towner, Rolette

Highway system
- United States Numbered Highway System; List; Special; Divided; North Dakota State Highway System; Interstate; US; State
← ND 256	→ ND 294

U.S. Route 281 (US 281) is a part of the U.S. Highway System that travels from Hidalgo, Texas and Brownsville, Texas, to its northern terminus at the International Peace Garden, north of Dunseith, North Dakota. In the U.S. state of North Dakota, US 281 extends from the South Dakota state line south of Ellendale, North Dakota and ends at the North Dakota–Manitoba border.

== Route description ==
In North Dakota, US 281 is a major north–south artery. It enters ND south of Ellendale and intersects ND 13 in Edgeley. Later it intersects Interstate 94 and US 52 at Jamestown. There is also a truck bypass of 281/52 around the west side of the city. The bypass follows I-94 west to exit 256. 281 and 52 remain paired together to Carrington, where it intersects with ND 200. From there, US 281 continues northward through New Rockford, where it junctions with ND 15 and Sheyenne, while US 52 heads west along ND 200 and then northwest toward Minot. Ten miles north of Sheyenne the highway curves in order to go around Devil's Lake, and then continues to west of Minnewaukan. It intersects US 2 near Churchs Ferry. From there it goes past Cando to ND at Rocklake. US 281 follows ND 5 westward to Dunseith, where the highway turns north in concurrence with North Dakota Highway 3 to its end at the Canada–United States border in the International Peace Garden. The northernmost section of US 281 passes through North Dakota's Turtle Mountains.

== History ==
The entire route of US 281 within the state was North Dakota Highway 4. In 1934, US 281 replaced Highway 4 south of Rock Lake. US 281 was extended north to the Canada–United States border between 1939 and 1940, replacing the remainder of Highway 4.

In 2013, 281 was rebuilt near Minnewaukan, North Dakota to accommodate flooding close to the city.

== Major intersections ==
County	Location	mi	km	Destinations	Notes
Dickey	Ellendale Township	0.000	0.000	US 281 south – Aberdeen	Continuation into South Dakota
Dickey	Ellendale	4.612	7.422	ND 11 west – Ashley	Southern end of ND 11 concurrency
Dickey	Ellendale	5.114	8.230	ND 11 east – Oakes	Northern end of ND 11 concurrency
LaMoure	Edgeley	30.680	49.375	ND 13 – Kulm, LaMoure	
LaMoure–Stutsman county line	Kennison–Severn township line	49.707	79.996	ND 46 – Gackle, Enderlin	
Stutsman	Jamestown	67.488	108.611	I-94 / US 52 Truck (By-pass) west / US 281 Truck (By-pass) north – Bismarck I-94 / US 52 east – Fargo	Southern end of US 52 concurrency, I-94 exit 258
Stutsman	Jamestown	69.485	111.825	ND 20 north	Southern terminus of ND 20
Stutsman	Jamestown	72.086	116.011	US 52 Truck (By-pass) east / US 281 Truck (By-pass) south	Jamestown Truck Bypass to I-94
Stutsman	Pingree	90.225	145.203	ND 36 west – Woodworth	Eastern terminus of ND 36
Stutsman–Foster county line	Walters–Melville township line	102.710	165.296	ND 9 east – Kensal	Western terminus of ND 9
Foster	Carrington	112.539	181.114	US 52 west / ND 200 – Harvey, Cooperstown	Northern end of US 52 concurrency
Eddy	Superior Township	125.557	202.064	ND 15 west – Fessenden, Minot	Southern end of ND 15 concurrency
Eddy	New Rockford	128.504	206.807	ND 15 east – ND 20	Northern end of ND 15 concurrency
Benson	Lallie Township	149.106	239.963	ND 57 east – Fort Totten, Devils Lake	Western terminus of ND 57
Benson	Minnewaukan	160.088	257.637	ND 19 west – Esmond	Southern end of ND 19 concurrency
Benson	West Bay Township	163.435	263.023	ND 19 east – Devils Lake	Northern end of ND 19 concurrency
Benson	Normania Township	175.184	281.931	US 2 west – Leeds	Southern end of US 2 concurrency
Benson	Churchs Ferry	178.239	286.848	US 2 east – Devils Lake	Northern end of US 2 concurrency
Benson	Churchs Ferry	178.433	287.160	US 281 Bus. south – Churchs Ferry	Northern terminus of US 281 Bus.
Towner	Cando	190.219	306.128	ND 17 – Wolford, Starkweather	
Towner	Paulson Township	200.226	322.233	ND 66 east – Egeland	Southern end of ND 66 concurrency
Towner	Sorenson Township	202.235	325.466	ND 66 west – Bisbee, Rolette	Northern end of ND 66 concurrency
Towner	Virginia Township	213.693	343.906	ND 5 east – Rock Lake	Southern end of ND 5 concurrency
Towner	Armourdale Township	221.175	355.947	ND 4 north – Hansboro, Port of Entry	Southern terminus of ND 4
Rolette	Rolla	232.462	374.111	ND 30	
Rolette	North Rolette	253.208	407.499	ND 3 south – Rugby	Southern end of ND 3 concurrency
Rolette	North Rolette	253.647	408.205	ND 5 west – Bottineau	Northern end of ND 5 concurrency
Rolette	North Rolette	263.800	424.545	ND 43 west – Lake Metigoshe	Eastern terminus of ND 43
International Peace Garden		267.190	430.001	Dunseith–Boissevain Border Crossing ND 3 ends, northern end of ND 3 concurrency	
International Peace Garden		267.190	430.001	PTH 10 north – Brandon	Continuation into Manitoba, Canada
1.000 mi = 1.609 km; 1.000 km = 0.621 mi: Concurrency terminus

== See also ==
U.S. Route 281
Previous state: South Dakota	North Dakota	Next state: Terminus
