= Tokio, North Dakota =

- Unincorporated community
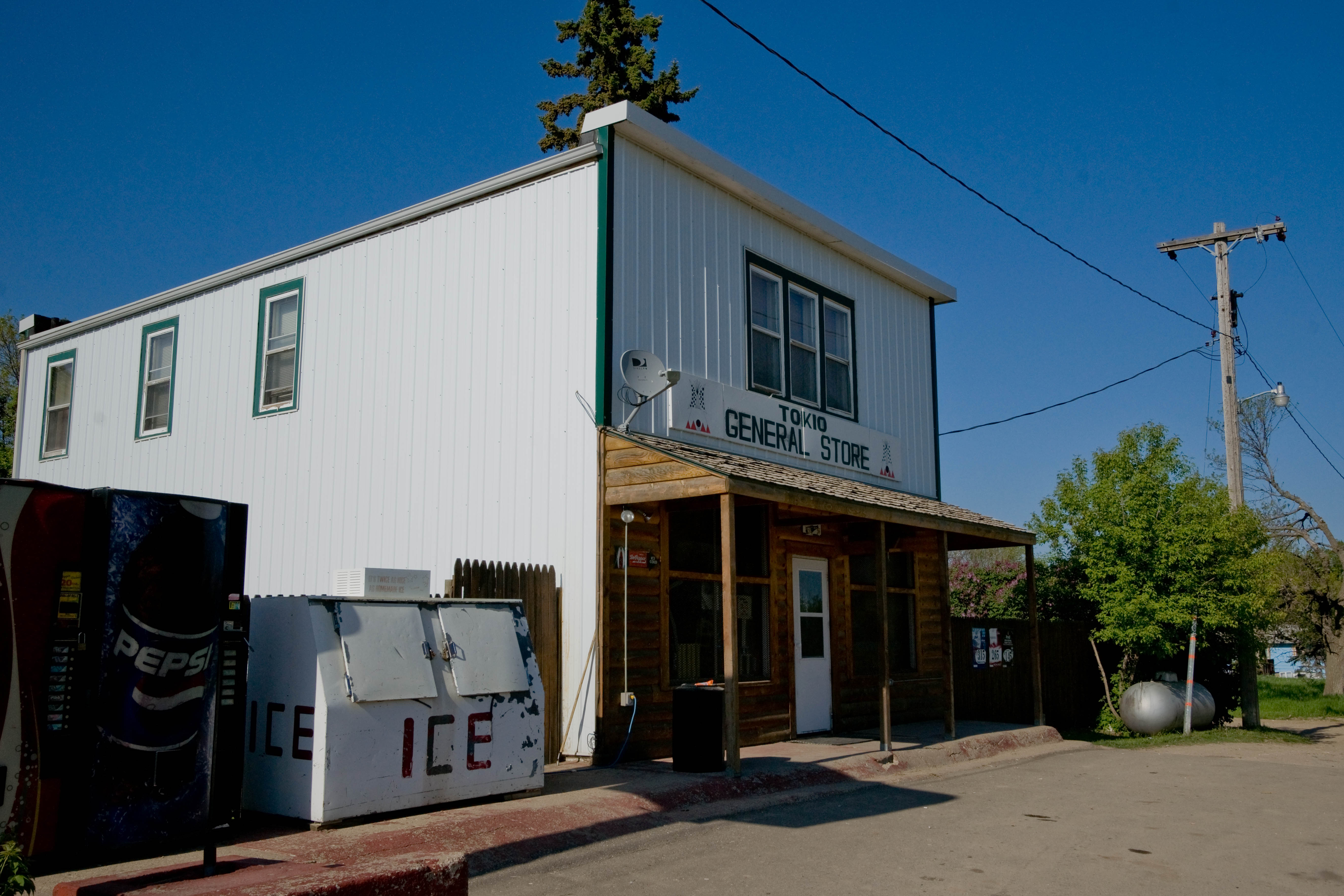
- Tokio General Store

- Location within the state of North Dakota
- Coordinates: 47°55′29″N 98°48′58″W
- Country: United States
- State: North Dakota
- County: Benson
- Township: Wood Lake Township
- Founded: 1906
- Elevation: 1,503 ft (458 m)
- Time zone: UTC-6 (Central (CST))
  - Summer (DST): UTC-5 (CDT)
- ZIP Code: 58379
- Area code: 701
- FIPS code: 38-79060
- GNIS feature ID: 1032494

Tokio is an unincorporated community in southeastern Benson County, North Dakota, United States, on the Spirit Lake Indian Reservation. It lies southeast of the city of Minnewaukan, the county seat of Benson County. It has a post office with the ZIP code 58379.

== History ==
Tokio was established in 1906 as a station along the Great Northern Railway. The post office was opened in 1907, and remains in operation today. A railroad official chose the name Tokio, based on the local Dakota word to-ki, or "gracious gift." However, some believe it is named after the city of Tokyo in Japan.
