= Rock Township, Benson County, North Dakota =

Civil township in North Dakota, U.S.

Rock Township is a civil township in Benson County, North Dakota, United States. As of the 2000 census, its population was 39.

== Geography ==
Rock Township is located at 47°54′30″N 99°05′01″W (47.9083319, -99.0837350) in public land survey Township 151N, Range 66W. It is almost entirely within the boundaries of the Spirit Lake Reservation. and has one of the lower population densities in Benson County, with 1.1 people per square mile. The Sheyenne River traverses the southern part of the township.

== History ==
Homesteading in Rock Township began in the early 1880s, even though the Indian reservation did not officially open to settlers until 1904. James McLaughlin, who had been the chief Indian agent at the local Bureau of Indian Affairs agency on the reservation, reached an agreement with the Spirit Lake Sioux Tribe which permitted settlement by non-tribal members. President Theodore Roosevelt proclaimed homesteading the area officially open on June 2, 1904.

By 1905 there were so many children that a school had to be built, and Plainview School District Number 31 was established that October. In 1910, township residents petitioned the county to allow them to formally organize a civil township with the name Plainview. However, there already existed a Plainview Township in Stutsman County, so the name Rock Township was adopted.

By 1920, approximately 35 children attended the Plainview School No. 1, and Plainview No. 2 and No. 3 were soon added. In 1953 there were not enough students to operate the Plainview School, so students were transported to nearby Sheyenne, with tuition paid for by the Plainview School District. In 1960, the Sheyenne School District and Plainview merged into one school district with shared bus service.

== Roads ==
At one time, the roads in Rock Township were extremely poor. The main road from Sheyenne to Devils Lake was known as the "Sunshine Trail," with the only marking being the letter "S" on a piece of tin nailed to a post. Today, the road has been rebuilt and serves as U.S. Route 281.

== See also ==
- Oberon, North Dakota
