= Harlow, North Dakota =

- Unincorporated town
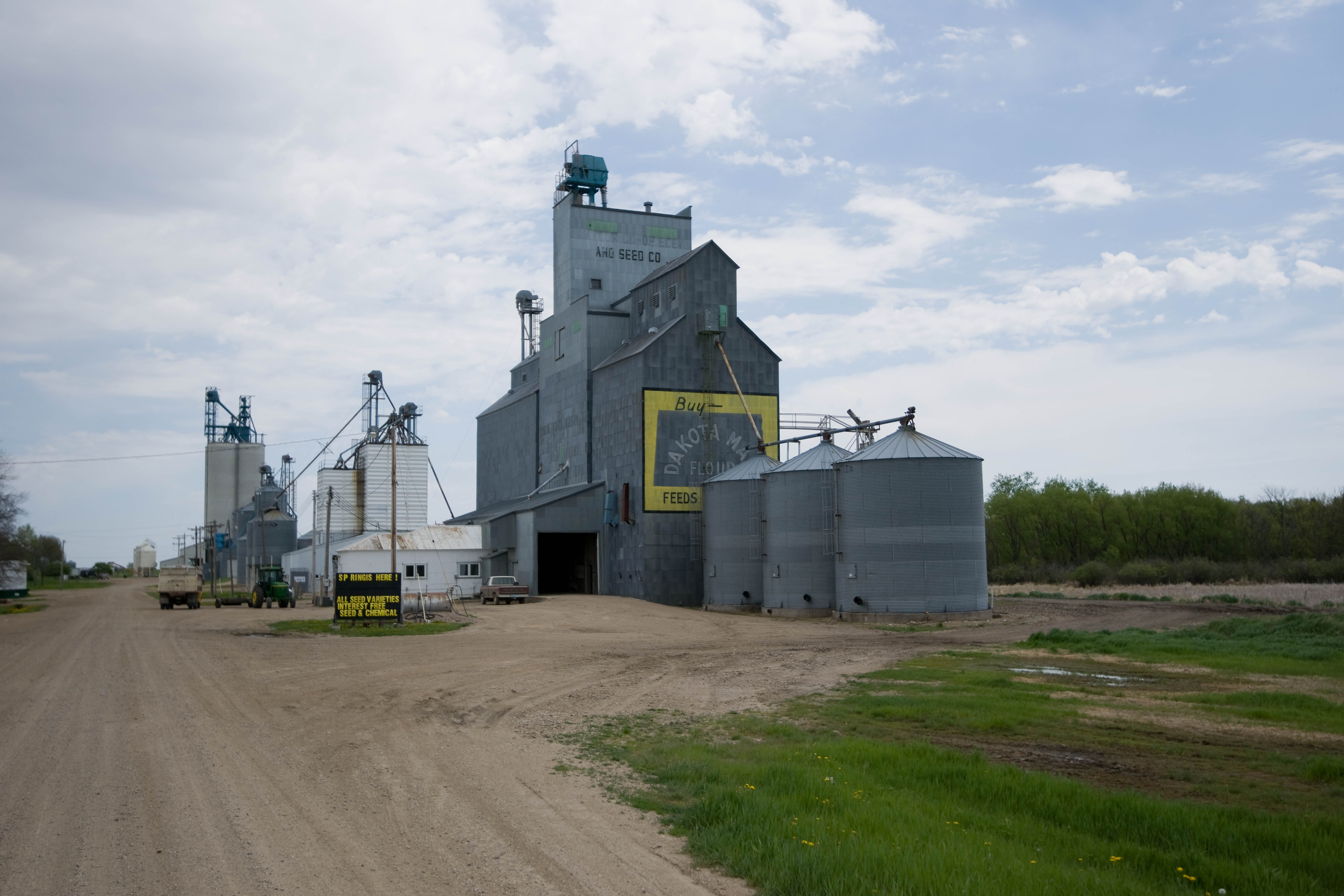
- The grain elevator in Harlow

- Location within the state of North Dakota
- Coordinates: 48°09′49″N 099°31′08″W
- Country: United States
- State: North Dakota
- County: Benson
- Founded: 1912
- Elevation: 1,644 ft (501 m)
- Time zone: UTC-6 (Central (CST))
  - Summer (DST): UTC-5 (CDT)
- ZIP Code: 58346
- Area code: 701
- FIPS code: 38-35460
- GNIS feature ID: 1029319

Harlow is an unincorporated town in Benson County, North Dakota, United States. It is located in Butte Valley Township along North Dakota Highway 30. Harlow is assigned Zip code 58346, which it shares with neighboring Leeds.

== History ==
Harlow was established in 1912 along the Soo Line Railroad. The post office was established in 1914 and was later assigned the zipcode 58340. The post office closed in 1984. The town's population was estimated as high as 100 during its development, but it never incorporated as a city. Alternative suggestions for the origin of the town's name are either after an official with the railroad or after the Harlow Old Fort House in Plymouth, Massachusetts.

The original homesteader was Louis Larsen Ulvestead in 1896. Local resident Ole Ronning (1905–2005), lived on the homestead until moving to Devils Lake in 2000. Ole and his wife, Alma, were known for publishing a comprehensive history of Harlow and the surrounding township in the 1960s.

== Notable person ==
- Byron Knutson, member of the North Dakota House of Representatives (1959–1962); North Dakota Insurance Commissioner (1977–1980); North Dakota Labor Commissioner (1987–1990)
