= Josephine, North Dakota =

- Unincorporated community
- Location within the state of North Dakota
- Coordinates: 47°56′23″N 99°18′50″W
- Country: United States
- State: North Dakota
- County: Benson
- Elevation: 1,540 ft (470 m)
- Time zone: UTC-7 (Mountain (MST))
  - Summer (DST): UTC-6 (MDT)
- Area code: 701
- GNIS feature ID: 1029696

Josephine is an unincorporated community in Benson County, North Dakota, United States. Since its name was changed in 1901, the unincorporated community takes its name from physician Josephin Lindstrom Stickleberger, a resident of Oberon, though in its history, minister Jean Baptiste was its namesake before the name was changed for the first time to Jenin in order to honour Marie Jenin, a pioneer and missionary. The original post office closed in 1906, reopened months later, and stayed open until 1943.
