= Oberon School District =

School district in North Dakota, United States

Address
- 315 A Street Oberon, North Dakota, 58357; United States

District information
- Type: Public
- Grades: K–7
- NCES District ID: 3814520

Students and staff
- Students: 41
- Teachers: 5.0
- Staff: 10.2
- Student–teacher ratio: 8.2

Other information
- Website: www.oberon.k12.nd.us

Oberon Public School District 16 is a school district headquartered in Oberon, North Dakota. It has grades K-7. It operates one school, Oberon Elementary School a.k.a. Oberon Public School.

Located in Benson County, the school serves Oberon and a portion of Fort Totten.

The district serves the Spirit Lake Tribe, and is on the Spirit Lake Native American Reservation.

== History ==
The school was built prior to 1918. In 2018 it received a federal grant of $4,691,494, intended for school districts that educate Native Americans.

In 2020 the district had 55 students. In 2020 four board members were criminally charged, accused of not properly using $150,000 in school money. Governor of North Dakota Doug Burgum and North Dakota Superintendent of Public Instruction Kirsten Baesler suspended the four. North Dakota state officials appointed their replacements.

In the midst of the controversy, the district replaced its former superintendent and principal with Jordan Brown.
