= Rich Valley Township =

Rich Valley Township may refer to the following townships in the United States:

- Rich Valley Township, McLeod County, Minnesota
- Rich Valley Township, Benson County, North Dakota
