= Leeds Township =

Leeds Township may refer to the following townships in the United States:

- Leeds Township, Murray County, Minnesota
- Leeds Township, Benson County, North Dakota
