= KABU =

Fort Totten, North Dakota; United States
- Broadcast area: Devils Lake, North Dakota
- Frequency: 90.7 MHz

Programming
- Format: Variety

Ownership
- Owner: Dakota Circle Tipi, Inc.

History
- First air date: 1999

Technical information
- Licensing authority: FCC
- Facility ID: 15265
- Class: C2
- ERP: 28,000 watts
- HAAT: 121 meters
- Transmitter coordinates: 47°59′31″N 98°56′53″W

Links
- Public license information: Public file; LMS

KABU (90.7 FM) is a radio station licensed to serve Fort Totten, North Dakota. The station is owned by Dakota Circle Tipi, Inc. It airs a Variety format. KABU serves the Spirit Lake Nation of the Dakota tribe in northern North Dakota.

The station was assigned the KABU call letters by the Federal Communications Commission on June 21, 1996.

== Construction permit ==
On January 16, 2008, the FCC granted the station a construction permit to upgrade to a class C2 station with an increase in effective radiated power to 28,000 watts and a rise in antenna height above average terrain to 121 meters (397 feet). The transmitter would also be minimally relocated to 47°59'31"N, 98°56'53"W. The license to cover was granted on June 14, 2010. The station received $97,000 in funding from the Shakopee Mdewakanton Sioux Community to pay for the new 85-foot broadcast tower.
