= Isabel Township =

Isabel Township may refer to one of the following places in the United States:

- Isabel Township, Fulton County, Illinois
- Isabel Township, Benson County, North Dakota
