= McClellan Township =

McClellan Township may refer to one of the following townships in the United States:

- McClellan Township, Jefferson County, Illinois
- McClellan Township, Newton County, Indiana
- McClellan Township, Benson County, North Dakota
