= Lallie, North Dakota =

- Unincorporated community
- Location within the state of North Dakota
- Coordinates: 47°58′42″N 99°12′57″W
- Country: United States
- State: North Dakota
- County: Benson
- Elevation: 1,562 ft (476 m)
- Time zone: UTC-7 (Mountain (MST))
  - Summer (DST): UTC-6 (MDT)
- Area code: 701
- GNIS feature ID: 1033871

Lallie is an unincorporated community in Benson County, North Dakota, United States. In 1885, it was originally named Fort Totten by the Northern Pacific Railroad, before becoming Totten in 1887 and then Lallie in 1889, taking the sister of Superintendent A.J. McCabe as its namesake.
