= Albert Township =

Albert Township may refer to the following townships in the United States:

- Albert Township, Michigan
- Albert Township, Benson County, North Dakota
