= Aurora Township =

Aurora Township may refer to:

- Aurora Township, Kane County, Illinois
- Aurora Township, Cloud County, Kansas
- Aurora Township, Minnesota
- Aurora Township, Benson County, North Dakota
- Aurora, Ohio, formerly Aurora Township, Portage County, Ohio
