= Fillmore, North Dakota =

- Unincorporated community
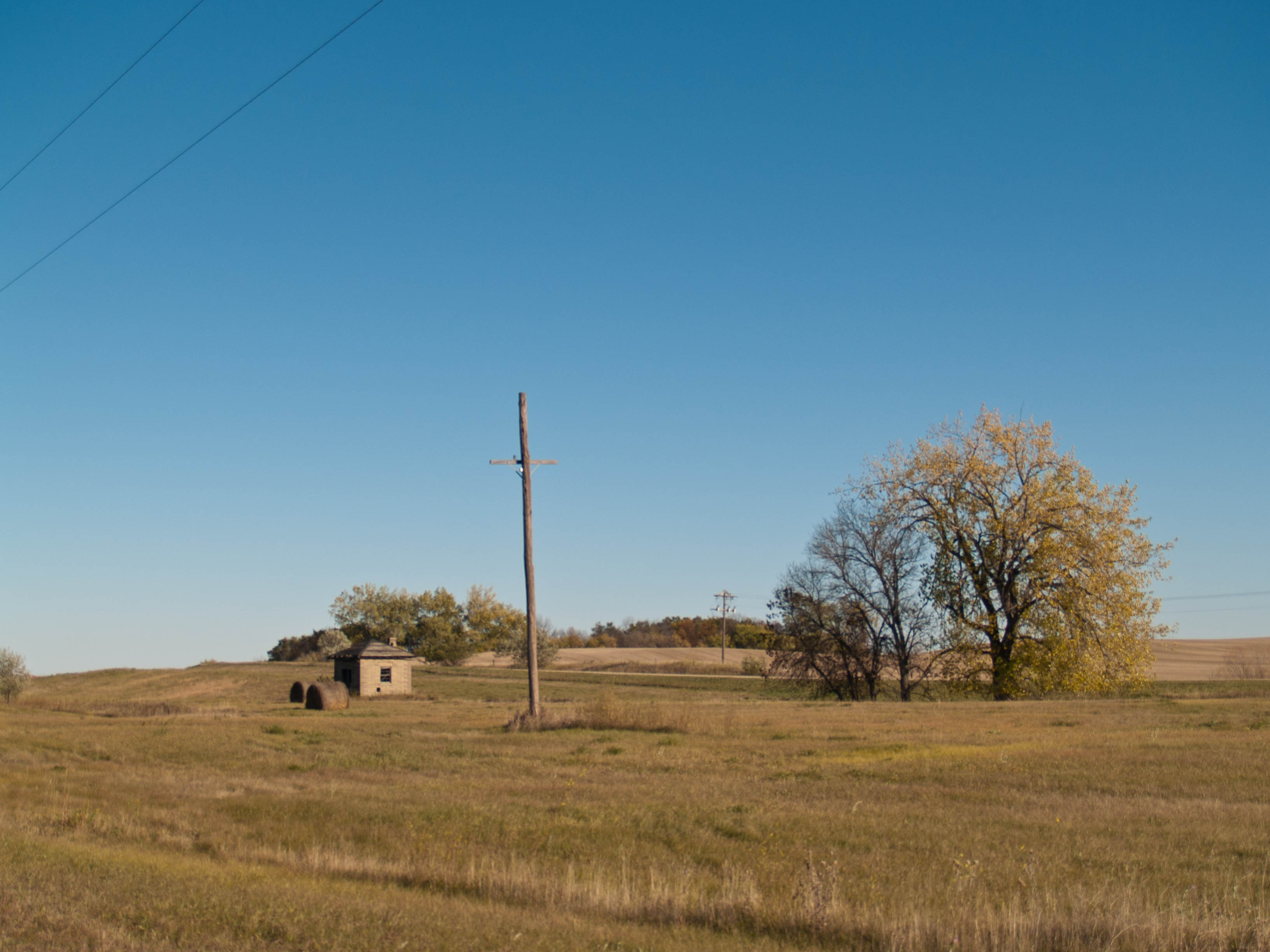
- Fillmore

- Location within the state of North Dakota
- Coordinates: 48°10′49″N 99°48′02″W
- Country: United States
- State: North Dakota
- County: Benson
- Elevation: 1,594 ft (486 m)
- Time zone: UTC-7 (Mountain (MST))
  - Summer (DST): UTC-6 (MDT)
- Area code: 701
- GNIS feature ID: 1028956

Fillmore is an unincorporated community located between Sand Lake and Cranberry Lake, in Benson County, North Dakota, United States.

== History ==
The population was 95 in 1940.
