= Hesper, North Dakota =

- Unincorporated town
- Location within the state of North Dakota
- Coordinates: 47°59′11″N 99°37′47″W
- Country: United States
- State: North Dakota
- County: Benson
- Elevation: 1,610 ft (490 m)
- Time zone: UTC-7 (Mountain (MST))
  - Summer (DST): UTC-6 (MDT)
- Area code: 701
- GNIS feature ID: 1029420

Hesper is a ghost town in Benson County, North Dakota, United States.
