= Baker, North Dakota =

- Unincorporated community
- Location within the state of North Dakota
- Coordinates: 48°09′38″N 99°38′51″W
- Country: United States
- State: North Dakota
- County: Benson
- Elevation: 1,644 ft (501 m)
- Time zone: UTC-7 (Mountain (MST))
  - Summer (DST): UTC-6 (MDT)
- Area code: 701
- GNIS feature ID: 1027787

Baker is an unincorporated community in Benson County, North Dakota, United States.

== History ==
The population was 70 in 1940.
