= York Township, Benson County, North Dakota =

Civil township in North Dakota, U.S.

Coordinates: 48°19′35″N 99°31′24″W

York Township is a civil township in Benson County, North Dakota, United States. As of the 2000 census, its population was 36.
