= Lohnes Township, Benson County, North Dakota =

Civil township in North Dakota, U.S.

Coordinates: 48°00′10″N 98°42′01″W

Lohnes Township is a civil township in Benson County, North Dakota, United States. As of the 2000 census, its population was 14.
