= Irvine Township, Benson County, North Dakota =

Civil township in North Dakota, U.S.

Coordinates: 48°20′00″N 99°13′31″W

Irvine Township is a civil township in Benson County, North Dakota, United States. As of the 2000 census, its population was 24.
