= Minco Township, Benson County, North Dakota =

Civil township in North Dakota, U.S.

Coordinates: 47°53′30″N 98°35′01″W

Minco Township is a civil township in Benson County, North Dakota, United States. As of the 2000 census, its population was 22.
