= Warwick Township, Benson County, North Dakota =

Civil township in North Dakota, U.S.

Coordinates: 47°53′37″N 98°42′53″W

Warwick Township is a civil township in Benson County, North Dakota, United States. As of the 2000 census, its population was 78.
