= South Viking Township, Benson County, North Dakota =

Civil township in North Dakota, U.S.

Coordinates: 47°51′45″N 99°28′01″W

South Viking Township is a civil township in Benson County, North Dakota, United States. As of the 2000 census, its population was 69.
