= Twin Lake Township, Benson County, North Dakota =

Civil township in North Dakota, U.S.

Coordinates: 48°13′30″N 99°40′01″W

Twin Lake Township is a civil township in Benson County, North Dakota, United States. As of the 2000 census, its population was 43.

== Geography ==
According to the United States Census Bureau, Twin Lake Township has approximately 33.87 sq mi (87.7 km^{2}) of land and 2.11 sq mi (5.5 km^{2}) of water.

== Demographics ==
At the 2020 census, Twin Lake Township had a population of 36, compared with 43 at the 2000 census. The township contained 17 housing units in 2020.

The State Historical Society of North Dakota's Country School House Project records the former Twin Lake Township Hall and Twin Lake Township School in section 28 of the township.
