= Fort Totten School District =

School district in North Dakota, United States

Address
- 7268 Hwy 57 W Fort Totten, North Dakota, 58335; United States

District information
- Type: Public
- Grades: 9–12
- NCES District ID: 3807170

Students and staff
- Students: 220
- Teachers: 23.39
- Staff: 15.94
- Student–teacher ratio: 9.41

Other information
- Website: www.fourwinds.k12.nd.us

Fort Totten Public School District 30 is a school district headquartered in Fort Totten, North Dakota. It directly operates Four Winds Community High School (FWHS). It is a part of the Four Winds Community School group, in association with the K-8 tribally controlled Tate Topa Tribal School, affiliated with the Bureau of Indian Education (BIE). Fort Totten directly operates a pre-kindergarten.

The school district, in Benson County, serves most of Fort Totten.

== History ==
In 1993 the school system, including the tribal K-8 and school district high school, had a total of 600 students. John Macdonald of the Associated Press wrote that the facility "is generally a well-maintained building." In 1993 the school temporarily closed after a boy died of a likely hantavirus infection. It later reopened.

In the 2013–2014 school year, students at the high school had to do an evacuation after the water line broke. Students later came back to the school, but the administration decided the school needed to be replaced. In 2015 the U.S. Department of Education Impact Aid Program gave the district $3.6 million for a replacement building.
