= Impark Township, Benson County, North Dakota =

Civil township in North Dakota, U.S.

Coordinates: 48°10′00″N 99°44′01″W

Impark Township is a civil township in Benson County, North Dakota, United States. At the 2000 census, its population was 40.
