= Esmond Township, Benson County, North Dakota =

Civil township in North Dakota, U.S.

Coordinates: 48°03′55″N 99°47′00″W

Esmond Township is a civil township in Benson County, North Dakota, United States. As of the 2000 census, its population was 50.
