= Benson County Courthouse =

- U.S. National Register of Historic Places
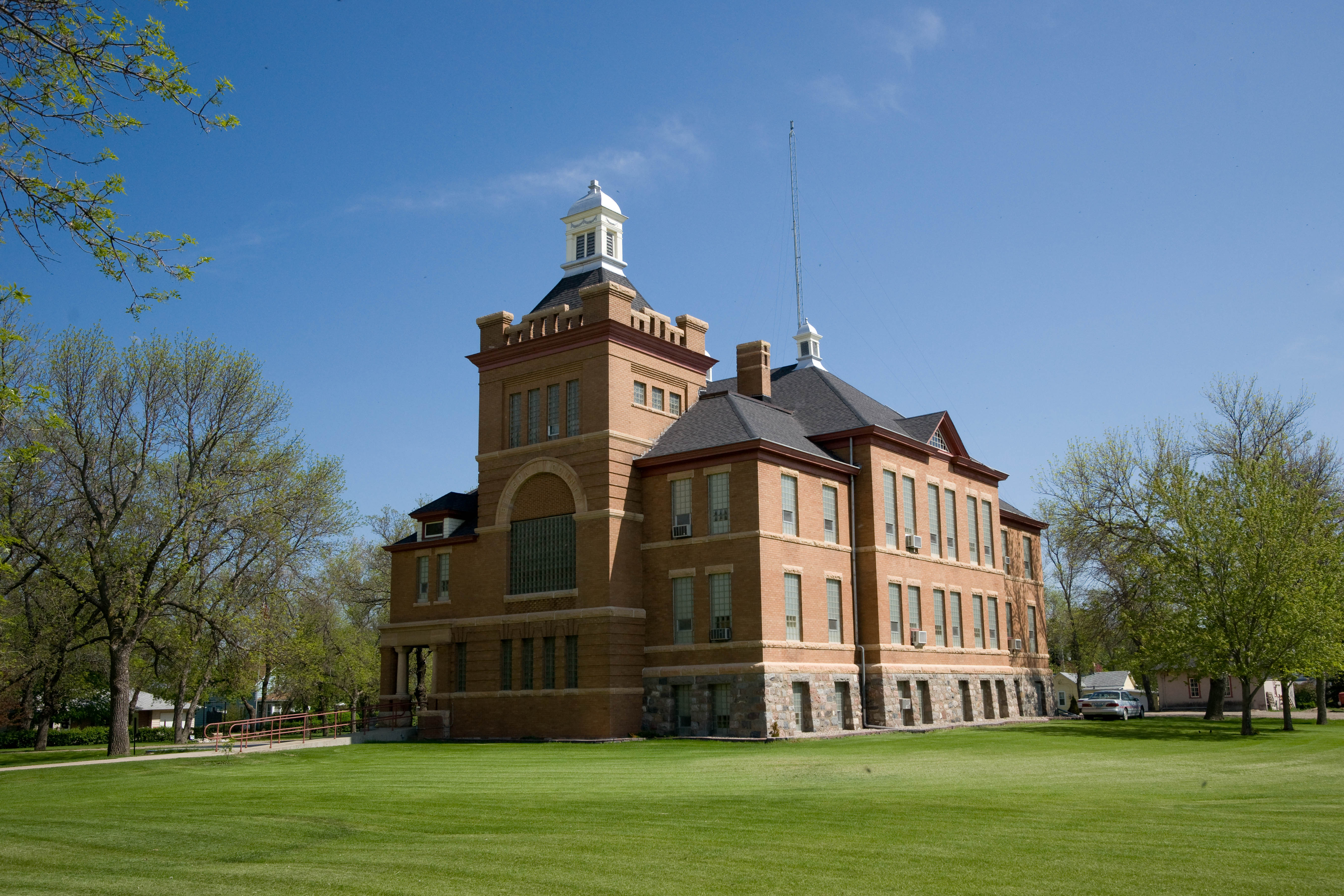
- Benson County Courthouse in 2009

- Location within North Dakota Location within the United States
- Location: 311 B Ave. S., Minnewaukan, North Dakota
- Coordinates: 48°4′8″N 99°14′59″W
- Area: 2.1 acres (0.85 ha)
- Built: 1900
- Built by: Lord & Co.
- Architect: Russell & Crandall
- Architectural style: Richardsonian Romanesque
- MPS: North Dakota County Courthouses TR
- NRHP reference No.: 78001988
- Added to NRHP: November 2, 1978

The Benson County Courthouse in Minnewaukan, North Dakota was built in 1900. It was listed on the National Register of Historic Places (NRHP) in 1978.

== Features ==
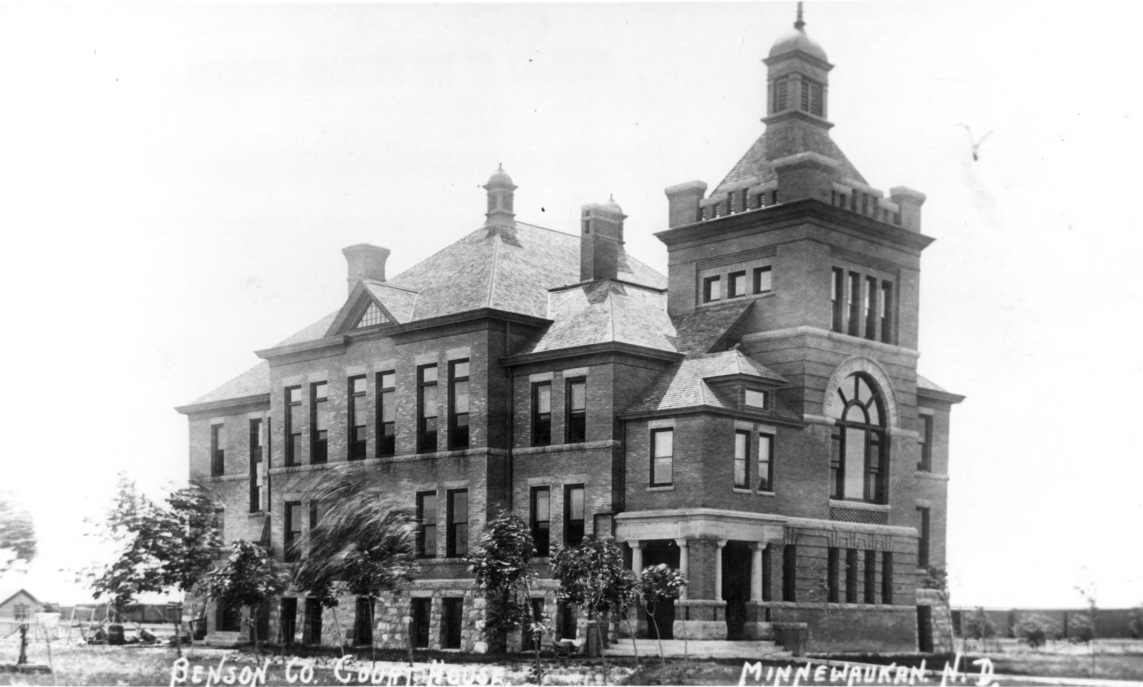
Benson County Courthouse, c. 1901-1910

According to its NRHP nomination, the building "is architecturally significant for its incorporation of the design principles of the Richardsonian Romanesque style. One of the last major public buildings in North Dakota to express the Picturesque aesthetic of the nineteenth century prior to the onset of Academic Revivalism, the structure has, despite some modifications, retained its original character to a remarkable degree." It was designed by Russell & Crandall, an obscure firm from Grand Forks.

Also, a "1901 promotional booklet for Minnewaukan acclaimed...: 'There are not many counties in North Dakota that can boast of as fine a county building as Benson county, and no people could be prouder of it than the citizens of Minnewaukan. It is 90 feet long by 60 feet wide, and 96 feet to the top of the flag staff. It is solid brick and stone, and is a model in design and finish. All the rooms are furnished with dark oak furniture, while the doors, casings, stairs and finishing is a light oak.'"
