= Oberon Township, Benson County, North Dakota =

Civil township in North Dakota, U.S.

Coordinates: 47°55′22″N 99°14′32″W

Oberon Township is a civil township in Benson County, North Dakota, United States. As of the 2000 census, its population was 91.
