= West Antelope Township, Benson County, North Dakota =

Civil township in North Dakota, U.S.

Coordinates: 47°51′45″N 99°23′31″W

West Antelope Township is a civil township in Benson County, North Dakota, United States.

In 2010, it had a population of 21 inhabitants and a population density of 0.23 people per km^{2}.

== Geography ==
According to the United States Census Bureau, the township has a total area of 93 km^{2}, of which 92.73 km^{2} is land and (0.29%) 0.27 km^{2} is water.

== Demographics ==
According to the 2010 census, there were 21 people living in the township of West Antelope. The population density was 0.23 inhabitants/km^{2}. The entire population was white. As of the 2000 census, its population had been 33.
