= Riggin Township, Benson County, North Dakota =

Civil township in North Dakota, US

Coordinates: 48°09′30″N 99°17′31″W

Riggin Township is a civil township in Benson County, North Dakota, United States. As of the 2000 census, its population was 63.
