= Twin Tree Township, Benson County, North Dakota =

Township in Benson County, North Dakota

Coordinates: 47°54′00″N 99°00′46″W

Twin Tree Township is a civil township in Benson County, North Dakota, United States. As of the 2000 census, its population was 50.
