= Benson County, North Dakota =

County in North Dakota, United States

- County
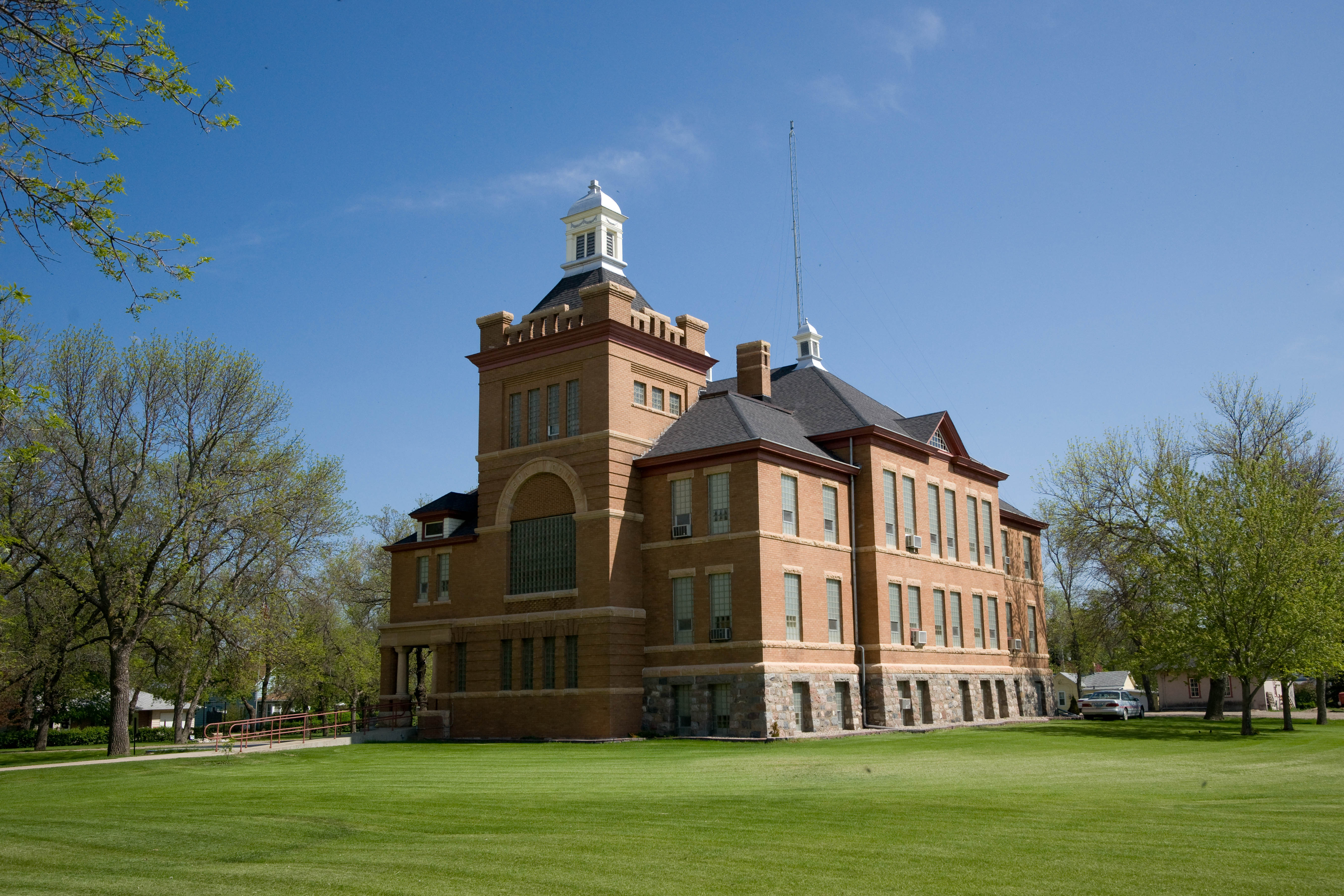
- The Benson County Courthouse in Minnewaukan

- Location within the U.S. state of North Dakota
- Coordinates: 48.071743°N 99.351152°W
- Country: United States
- State: North Dakota
- Founded: March 9, 1883 (created); June 4, 1884 (organized)
- Named for: Bertil W. Benson
- Seat: Minnewaukan
- Largest community: Fort Totten

Area
  - Total: 1,439.396 sq mi (3,728.02 km^{2})
  - Land: 1,388.555 sq mi (3,596.34 km^{2})
  - Water: 50.841 sq mi (131.68 km^{2}) 3.53%

Population (2020)
  - Total: 5,964
  - Estimate (2025): 5,759 ▼
  - Density: 4.147/sq mi (1.601/km^{2})
- Time zone: UTC−6 (Central)
  - Summer (DST): UTC−5 (CDT)
- Area code: 701
- Congressional district: At-large
- Website: bensoncountynd.com

Benson County is a county in the U.S. state of North Dakota. As of the 2020 census, the population was 5,964, and was estimated to be 5,759 in 2025. The county seat is Minnewaukan.

== History ==
The county was created on March 9, 1883 by the Dakota Territory legislature, and was named for Bertil W. Benson, a Dakota Territory legislator at the time. The county government was organized on June 4, 1884, and its boundary lines were altered by two legislative actions in 1885.

The White Horse Hill National Game Preserve and much of the Spirit Lake Indian Reservation is in the county.

== Geography ==
Much of the east boundary line of Benson County is delineated by the shore of Devils Lake, a closed-capture lake which in an overflow condition spills into the Sheyenne River. The North Fork Sheyenne River flows southeasterly through the lower southwestern portion of the county.

The terrain of Benson County consists of rolling hills dotted with lakes, ponds and drainages. The terrain slopes to the east, and its highest point is on the lower portion of its west boundary line, at 1,624 ft (495 m) ASL.

According to the United States Census Bureau, the county has a total area of 1,439.396 square miles (3,728.02 km^{2}), of which 1,388.555 square miles (3,596.34 km^{2}) is land and 50.841 square miles (131.68 km^{2}) (3.53%) is water. It is the 19th largest county in North Dakota by total area.

=== Adjacent counties ===
- Towner County – north
- Ramsey County – northeast
- Nelson County – east
- Eddy County – southeast
- Wells County – southwest
- Pierce County – west

=== Major highways ===
- U.S. Highway 2
- U.S. Highway 281
- North Dakota Highway 19
- North Dakota Highway 20
- North Dakota Highway 57

=== Protected areas ===
- Buffalo Lake National Wildlife Refuge (part)
- Grahams Island State Park (part)
- Pleasant Lake National Wildlife Refuge
- Silver Lake National Wildlife Refuge (part)
- White Horse Hill National Game Preserve
- Volk National Wildlife Refuge
- Wood Lake National Wildlife Refuge
- Wurgler National Wildlife Refuge

=== Lakes ===
- Broken Bone Lake
- Cranberry Lake
- Free Peoples Lake
- Horseshoe Lake
- Lake Murie
- Lake Yri
- Long Lake
- Sand Lake
- Shin Bone Lake
- Spring Lake
- Stink Lake
- Stony Lake
- Wood Lake

== Demographics ==
Historical population
Census	Pop.	Note	%±
1890	2,460		—
1900	8,320		238.2%
1910	12,681		52.4%
1920	13,095		3.3%
1930	13,327		1.8%
1940	12,629		−5.2%
1950	10,675		−15.5%
1960	9,435		−11.6%
1970	8,245		−12.6%
1980	7,944		−3.7%
1990	7,198		−9.4%
2000	6,964		−3.3%
2010	6,660		−4.4%
2020	5,964		−10.5%
2025 (est.)	5,759	▼	−3.4%
U.S. Decennial Census; 1790–1960 1900–1990; 1990–2000 2010–2020

As of the fourth quarter of 2024, the median home value in Benson County was $88,049. As of the 2023 American Community Survey, there are 1,922 estimated households in Benson County with an average of 3.04 persons per household. The county has a median household income of $68,049. Approximately 22.7% of the county's population lives at or below the poverty line. Benson County has an estimated 52.2% employment rate, with 22.1% of the population holding a bachelor's degree or higher and 88.5% holding a high school diploma.

The top five reported ancestries (people were allowed to report up to two ancestries, thus the figures will generally add to more than 100%) were English (91.9%), Spanish (1.1%), Indo-European (0.6%), Asian and Pacific Islander (0.6%), and Other (5.8%). The median age in the county was 32.4 years.

Benson County, North Dakota – racial and ethnic composition
Note: the US Census treats Hispanic/Latino as an ethnic category. This table excludes Latinos from the racial categories and assigns them to a separate category. Hispanics/Latinos may be of any race.

Race / ethnicity (NH = non-Hispanic)	Pop. 1980	Pop. 1990	Pop. 2000	Pop. 2010	Pop. 2020
White alone (NH)	5,606 (70.57%)	4,408 (61.24%)	3,533 (50.73%)	2,861 (42.96%)	2,532 (42.45%)
Black or African American alone (NH)	1 (0.01%)	0 (0.00%)	7 (0.10%)	1 (0.02%)	2 (0.03%)
Native American or Alaska Native alone (NH)	2,309 (29.07%)	2,760 (38.34%)	3,312 (47.56%)	3,631 (54.52%)	3,190 (53.49%)
Asian alone (NH)	1 (0.01%)	3 (0.04%)	1 (0.01%)	3 (0.05%)	7 (0.12%)
Pacific Islander alone (NH)	—	—	1 (0.01%)	1 (0.02%)	0 (0.00%)
Other race alone (NH)	0 (0.00%)	3 (0.04%)	0 (0.00%)	0 (0.00%)	1 (0.02%)
Mixed race or multiracial (NH)	—	—	55 (0.79%)	86 (1.29%)	143 (2.40%)
Hispanic or Latino (any race)	27 (0.34%)	24 (0.33%)	55 (0.79%)	77 (1.16%)	89 (1.49%)
Total	7,944 (100.00%)	7,198 (100.00%)	6,964 (100.00%)	6,660 (100.00%)	5,964 (100.00%)

=== 2024 estimate ===
As of the 2024 estimate, there were 5,756 people and 1,922 households residing in the county. There were 2,549 housing units at an average density of 2.84 per square mile (1.1/km^{2}). The racial makeup of the county was 43.7% White (43.2% NH White), 0.5% African American, 52.8% Native American, 0.6% Asian, 0.0% Pacific Islander, _% from some other races and 2.4% from two or more races. Hispanic or Latino people of any race were 2.0% of the population.

=== 2020 census ===
As of the 2020 census, there were 5,964 people, 2,015 households, and 1,364 families residing in the county. The population density was 4.3 inhabitants per square mile (1.7/km^{2}) and there were 2,542 housing units at an average density of 1.8 inhabitants per square mile (0.7/km^{2}). Of the residents, 34.2% were under the age of 18 and 15.4% were 65 years of age or older; the median age was 33.0 years. For every 100 females there were 106.2 males, and for every 100 females age 18 and over there were 105.4 males. The racial makeup of the county was 42.6% White, 0.1% Black or African American, 53.9% American Indian and Alaska Native, 0.1% Asian, 0.03% Pacific Islander, 0.3% from some other race, and 2.9% from two or more races. Hispanic or Latino residents of any race comprised 1.5% of the population. There were 2,015 households in the county, of which 36.4% had children under the age of 18 living with them and 25.1% had a female householder with no spouse or partner present. About 27.5% of all households were made up of individuals and 12.1% had someone living alone who was 65 years of age or older. Among the 2,542 housing units, 20.7% were vacant. Of the occupied units, 71.6% were owner-occupied and 28.4% were renter-occupied. The homeowner vacancy rate was 1.6% and the rental vacancy rate was 13.4%.

=== 2010 census ===
As of the 2010 census, there were 6,660 people, 2,233 households, and 1,628 families residing in the county. The population density was 4.8 inhabitants per square mile (1.9/km^{2}). There were 2,950 housing units at an average density of 2.1 inhabitants per square mile (0.8/km^{2}). The racial makeup of the county was 43.38% White, 0.02% African American, 55.00% Native American, 0.05% Asian, 0.02% Pacific Islander, 0.15% from some other races and 1.40% from two or more races. Hispanic or Latino people of any race were 1.16% of the population. In terms of ancestry, 22.0% were Norwegian, 18.0% were German, 5.0% were Irish, and 0.6% were American.

Of the 2,233 households, 41.3% had children under the age of 18 living with them, 42.3% were married couples living together, 20.6% had a female householder with no husband present, 27.1% were non-families, and 23.2% of all households were made up of individuals. The average household size was 2.98 and the average family size was 3.46. The median age was 31.6 years.

The median income for a household in the county was $30,479 and the median income for a family was $34,597. Males had a median income of $31,729 versus $25,253 for females. The per capita income for the county was $14,545. About 26.1% of families and 35.6% of the population were below the poverty line, including 48.3% of those under age 18 and 16.9% of those age 65 or over.

== Communities ==
Cities and CDPs have population included as of 2020, and townships have the population as of 2020. The largest community by far is Fort Totten, followed by Leeds, Maddock and the county seat, Minnewaukan. There are nine cities in the county. The largest township by a 60% margin is Mission (935), which is on the south shore of Devils Lake and is popular for vacationing, as well as gambling at the Spirit Lake Casino and Resort. It is within the Spirit Lake Indian Reservation. It is followed by Wood Lake Township (471), immediately to the south of Mission Township and also included in the reservation. The third largest is Lallie Township (325), to the west of Fort Totten on the south shore of Devils Lake and within the reservation.

=== Cities ===
- Brinsmade
- Esmond
- Knox
- Leeds
- Maddock
- Minnewaukan (county seat)
- Oberon
- Warwick
- York

=== Census-designated place ===
- Fort Totten

=== Unincorporated communities ===
- Baker
- Fillmore
- Flora
- Harlow
- Hesper
- Isabel
- Josephine
- Lallie
- Pleasant Lake
- Saint Michael
- Tokio

=== Townships ===
- Albert
- Arne
- Aurora
- Beaver
- Broe
- Butte Valley
- East Fork
- Eldon
- Esmond
- Hesper
- Impark
- Iowa
- Irvine
- Isabel
- Knox
- Lake Ibsen
- Lallie
- Leeds
- Lohnes
- McClellan
- Minco
- Mission
- Normania
- North Viking
- Oberon
- Pleasant Lake
- Rich Valley
- Riggin
- Rock
- South Viking
- Twin Lake
- Twin Tree
- Warwick
- West Antelope
- West Bay
- Wood Lake
- York

== Politics ==
Typical of many counties in the state where a significant share of the population is Native American, Benson County used to lean Democratic in presidential elections. Prior to 2020, no Republican candidate had won the majority of the county's votes since Ronald Reagan in 1984. However, George W. Bush in 2000 & Donald Trump in 2016 both won a plurality of the county's votes. In 2020, Trump won a majority of the county's votes, gaining nearly 56% of the county's votes, and in 2024 he further increased his vote share, gaining over 58% of the votes.

United States presidential election results for Benson County, North Dakota
Year	Republican		Democratic		Third party(ies)	
Year	No.	%	No.	%	No.	%
1900	1,084	75.49%	319	22.21%	33	2.30%
1904	1,111	85.59%	143	11.02%	44	3.39%
1908	1,363	67.81%	553	27.51%	94	4.68%
1912	515	26.13%	594	30.14%	862	43.73%
1916	1,210	53.30%	922	40.62%	138	6.08%
1920	3,540	81.10%	680	15.58%	145	3.32%
1924	1,870	45.00%	246	5.92%	2,040	49.09%
1928	2,621	53.80%	2,194	45.03%	57	1.17%
1932	1,170	23.79%	3,650	74.23%	97	1.97%
1936	1,020	19.02%	3,343	62.33%	1,000	18.65%
1940	2,485	45.85%	2,898	53.47%	37	0.68%
1944	1,726	43.04%	2,261	56.38%	23	0.57%
1948	1,920	44.33%	2,216	51.17%	195	4.50%
1952	3,192	69.63%	1,353	29.52%	39	0.85%
1956	2,340	55.67%	1,851	44.04%	12	0.29%
1960	2,259	50.84%	2,181	49.09%	3	0.07%
1964	1,489	36.67%	2,566	63.20%	5	0.12%
1968	1,707	46.86%	1,772	48.64%	164	4.50%
1972	2,050	55.09%	1,635	43.94%	36	0.97%
1976	1,689	45.34%	1,973	52.97%	63	1.69%
1980	2,149	59.91%	1,119	31.20%	319	8.89%
1984	1,729	51.41%	1,599	47.55%	35	1.04%
1988	1,316	43.42%	1,691	55.79%	24	0.79%
1992	874	33.30%	1,126	42.90%	625	23.81%
1996	850	39.13%	1,059	48.76%	263	12.11%
2000	1,055	48.98%	952	44.20%	147	6.82%
2004	1,002	44.61%	1,196	53.25%	48	2.14%
2008	773	32.56%	1,569	66.09%	32	1.35%
2012	868	40.24%	1,235	57.26%	54	2.50%
2016	929	46.20%	842	41.87%	240	11.93%
2020	1,094	55.79%	822	41.92%	45	2.29%
2024	1,163	58.09%	795	39.71%	44	2.20%

== Education ==
School districts include:

K-12:

- Dakota Prairie Public School District 1
- Devils Lake Public Schools
- Fort Totten School District
- Harvey Public Schools
- Leeds School District 6
- Maddock Public School District 9
- Minnewaukan Public School District 5
- New Rockford-Sheyenne Public School
- North Star School District
- Rugby Public Schools
- Warwick Public School District 29

Elementary districts:

- Oberon School District

== See also ==
- National Register of Historic Places listings in Benson County, North Dakota
