= Broe Township, Benson County, North Dakota =

Civil township in North Dakota, U.S.

Coordinates: 48°10′00″N 99°40′01″W

Broe Township is a civil township in Benson County, North Dakota, United States. As of the 2000 census, its population was 43.
