= Lake Ibsen Township, Benson County, North Dakota =

Civil township in North Dakota, U.S.

Coordinates: 48°13′30″N 99°21′01″W

Lake Ibsen Township is a civil township in Benson County, North Dakota, United States. As of the 2000 census, its population was 39. It is named for the nearby Lake Ibsen, named by Norwegian settlers after playwright Henrik Ibsen.
