= Knox Township, Benson County, North Dakota =

Civil township in North Dakota, U.S.

Coordinates: 48°19′35″N 99°39′09″W

Knox Township is a civil township in Benson County, North Dakota, United States. At the time of the 2020 census, the population of Knox Township was 28, a decline from the 2000 census, when its population was 36. Racially, 96% of the population of Knox Township is white. Knox Township surrounds the city of Knox.
