= White Horse Hill National Game Preserve =

Protected area in Benson County, North Dakota

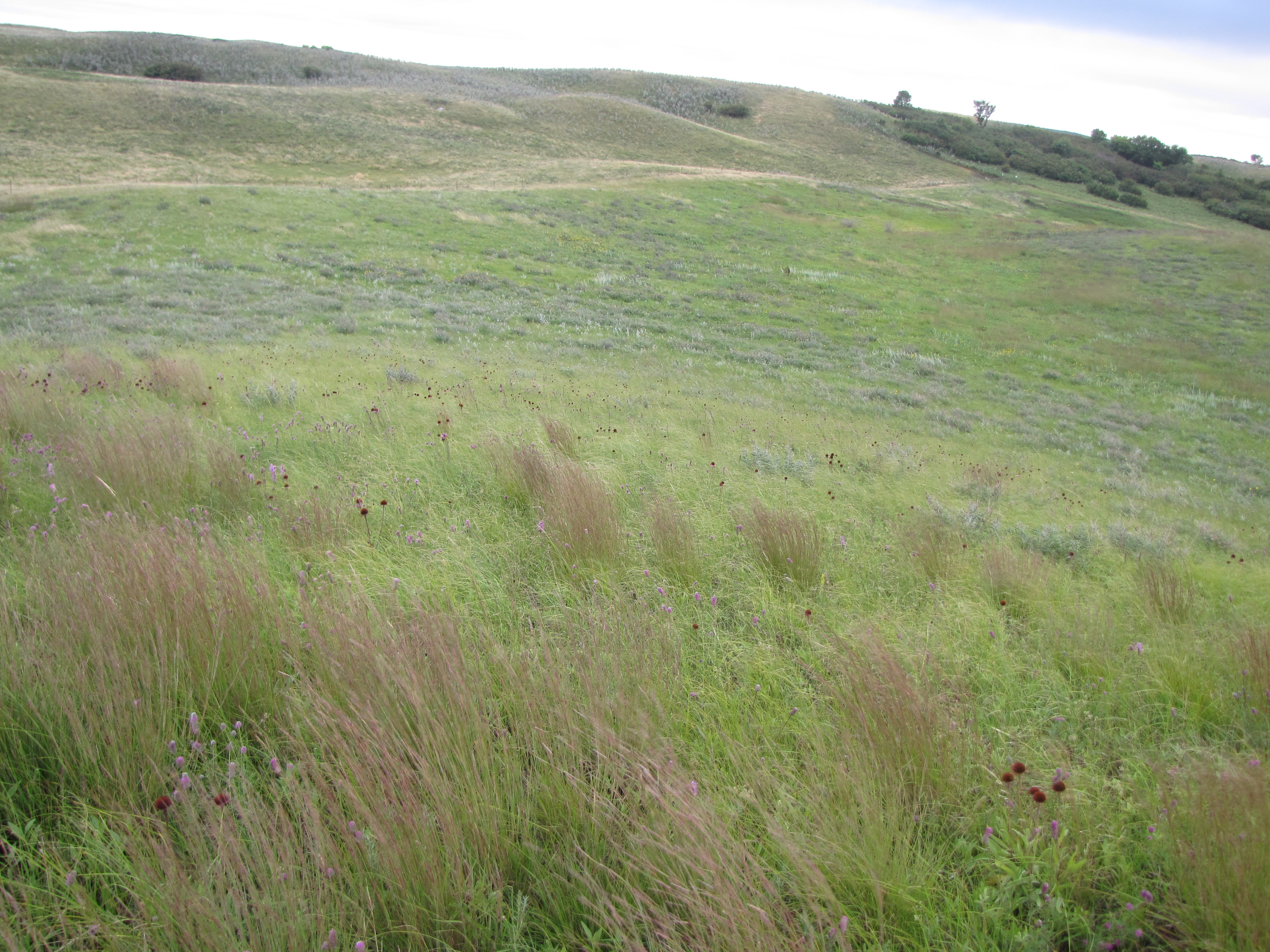
- Landscape at White Horse Hill National Game Preserve
- Interactive map of White Horse Hill National Game Preserve
- Location: Benson County, North Dakota, USA
- Coordinates: 47°59′10″N 98°58′35″W
- Area: 1,674 acres (6.77 km^{2})
- Established: 1904 as Sullys Hill Park
- Governing body: U.S. Fish and Wildlife Service
- Website: Official website

White Horse Hill National Game Preserve (Dakota: Šúŋkawakháŋ Ská Pahá, formerly known as Sullys Hill National Game Preserve) is a National Wildlife Refuge and nature center located on the shore of Devils Lake in Benson County, North Dakota, within the Spirit Lake Tribe reservation.

== History ==
In 1904, Congress authorized a memorial park at the site, and President Theodore Roosevelt established it as Sullys Hill Park. Though not part of its official name, it would be called Sullys Hill National Park, the meaning of "national park" not yet standardized, as this site's small size and lack of a significant landmark was inconsistent with other national parks. It was first named after General Alfred Sully, son of the painter Thomas Sully who gained his reputation by carrying out several massacres of Dakota including at the Battle of Whitestone Hill.

On March 3, 1931, during the Great Depression, the United States Congress transferred the park to be managed by the Fish and Wildlife Service as a wildlife refuge, where hunting is permitted with the Spirit Lake Tribe having both fishing and hunting rights. It is one of only seven National Parks to have been disbanded. Of these seven parks, only White Horse Hill and Mackinac National Park in Michigan, now Mackinac Island State Park, are no longer under the control of the National Park Service.

In December 2019, the park was renamed through an act of Congress to its traditional Dakota name of White Horse Hill. In May 2019, the Spirit Lake Tribal council had requested the federal government change the name to White Horse Hill in cooperation with the governor's office and the North Dakota Department of Tourism stating, "The Spirit Lake Dakota people... believe the name chosen, White Horse Hill, comes from historical happenings that are sacred as well as unique to the Dakota people. White Horse Hill (Sunka Wakan Ska Pa Ha) reflects a positive experience to the Dakota People rather than an individual who was destructive to the Dakota people and their culture".

== Recreation and natural resources ==
American bison grazing at the preserve

The park's 1,674 acres (6.8 km^{2}), a mixture of mixed grass prairie, marshes and wooded hills, includes wildlife as 20-30 American bison, 25-40 elk, 20-30 white-tailed deer, and a colony of prairie dogs. An array of birds, insects, and plants have also been identified within the refuge. Open seasonally, the visitor center includes an exhibit hall of mounted North Dakota animals in prairie, wetland, forest, and agriculture habitats, education classrooms, and a book store. The center offer programs for school groups, public workshops, guided nature hikes, bird-watching walks, summer youth programs, and conservation programs throughout the year.
