= Lallie Township, Benson County, North Dakota =

Civil township in North Dakota, U.S.

Coordinates: 47°58′30″N 99°05′01″W

Lallie Township is a civil township in Benson County, North Dakota, United States. As of the 2000 census, its population was 364.
