= Aurora Township, Benson County, North Dakota =

Civil township in North Dakota, U.S.

Coordinates: 48°00′30″N 99°24′01″W

Aurora Township is a civil township in Benson County, North Dakota, United States. As of the 2000 census, its population was 28.
