= Oberon, North Dakota =

- City
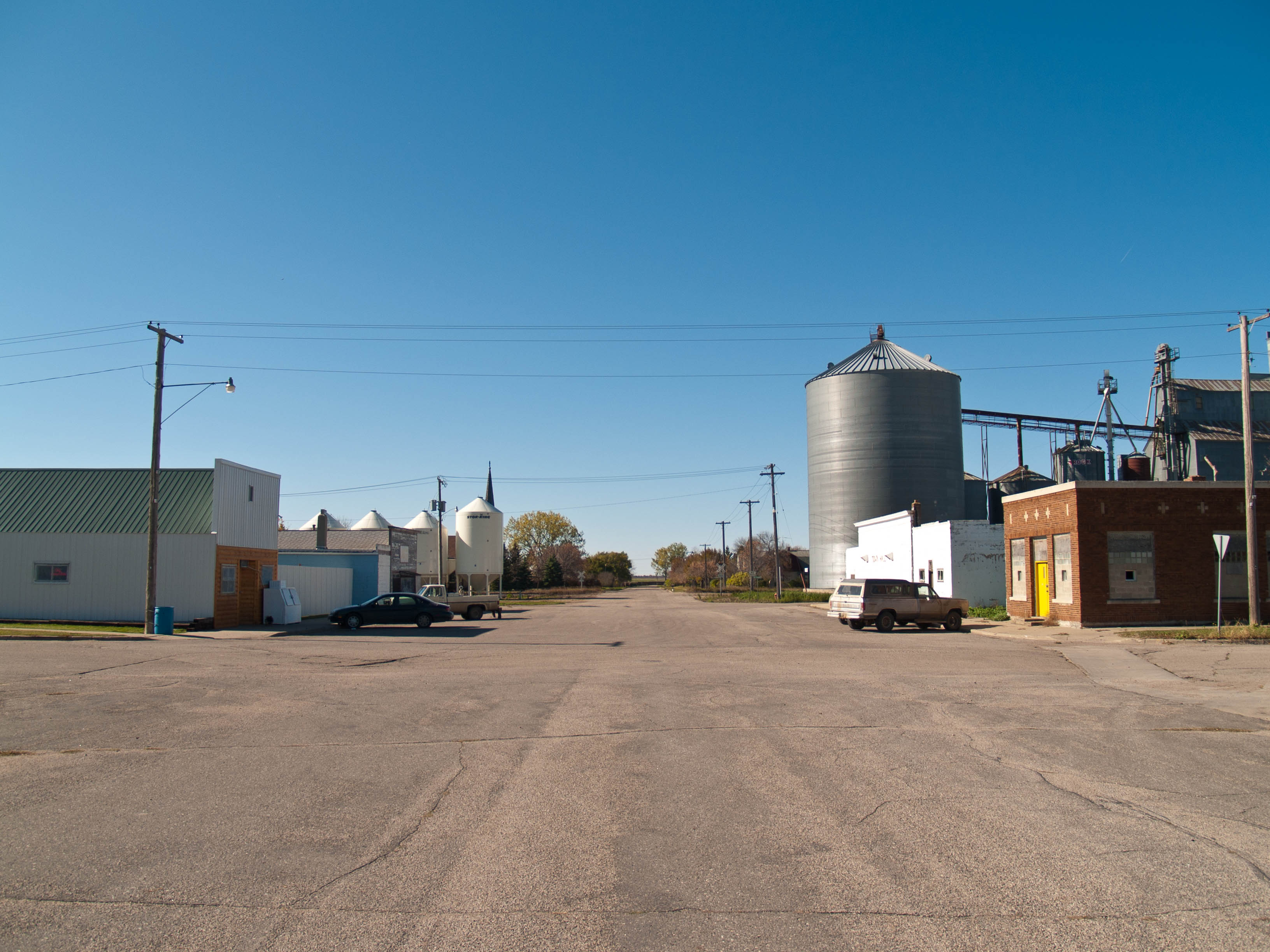
- Street in Oberon

- Location of Oberon, North Dakota
- Coordinates: 47°55′27″N 99°12′21″W
- Country: United States
- State: North Dakota
- County: Benson

Area
  - Total: 0.35 sq mi (0.91 km^{2})
  - Land: 0.35 sq mi (0.91 km^{2})
  - Water: 0.0039 sq mi (0.01 km^{2})
- Elevation: 1,562 ft (476 m)

Population (2020)
  - Total: 101
  - Estimate (2024): 93
  - Density: 288.4/sq mi (111.34/km^{2})
- Time zone: UTC-6 (Central (CST))
  - Summer (DST): UTC-5 (CDT)
- ZIP code: 58357
- Area code: 701
- FIPS code: 38-59020
- GNIS feature ID: 1036206

Oberon is a city in Benson County, North Dakota, United States. The population was 101 at the 2020 census. Oberon was founded in 1886.

== Geography ==
According to the United States Census Bureau, the city has a total area of 0.34 square miles (0.88 km^{2}), all land.

== Demographics ==
Historical population
Census	Pop.	Note	%±
1950	238		—
1960	248		4.2%
1970	151		−39.1%
1980	150		−0.7%
1990	103		−31.3%
2000	81		−21.4%
2010	105		29.6%
2020	101		−3.8%
2024 (est.)	94		−6.9%
U.S. Decennial Census; 2020 Census

=== 2010 census ===
As of the census of 2010, there were 105 people, 42 households, and 28 families living in the city. The population density was 308.8 inhabitants per square mile (119.2/km^{2}). There were 58 housing units at an average density of 170.6 per square mile (65.9/km^{2}). The racial makeup of the city was 62.9% White, 31.4% Native American, and 5.7% from two or more races. Hispanic or Latino of any race were 9.5% of the population.

There were 42 households, of which 38.1% had children under the age of 18 living with them, 42.9% were married couples living together, 14.3% had a female householder with no husband present, 9.5% had a male householder with no wife present, and 33.3% were non-families. 33.3% of all households were made up of individuals, and 19.1% had someone living alone who was 65 years of age or older. The average household size was 2.50 and the average family size was 3.11.

The median age in the city was 39.5 years. 33.3% of residents were under the age of 18; 4% were between the ages of 18 and 24; 24.7% were from 25 to 44; 18.2% were from 45 to 64; and 20% were 65 years of age or older. The gender makeup of the city was 51.4% male and 48.6% female.

=== 2000 census ===
As of the census of 2000, there were 81 people, 38 households, and 21 families living in the city. The population density was 240.9 inhabitants per square mile (93.0/km^{2}). There were 46 housing units at an average density of 136.8 per square mile (52.8/km^{2}). The racial makeup of the city was 74.07% White, 22.22% Native American, and 3.70% from two or more races.

There were 38 households, out of which 15.8% had children under the age of 18 living with them, 47.4% were married couples living together, 5.3% had a female householder with no husband present, and 44.7% were non-families. 42.1% of all households were made up of individuals, and 21.1% had someone living alone who was 65 years of age or older. The average household size was 2.13 and the average family size was 2.95.

In the city, the population was spread out, with 22.2% under the age of 18, 6.2% from 18 to 24, 19.8% from 25 to 44, 29.6% from 45 to 64, and 22.2% who were 65 years of age or older. The median age was 46 years. For every 100 females, there were 84.1 males. For every 100 females age 18 and over, there were 85.3 males.

The median income for a household in the city was $23,750, and the median income for a family was $45,417. Males had a median income of $30,833 versus $15,625 for females. The per capita income for the city was $14,348. There were 19.0% of families and 25.0% of the population living below the poverty line, including 48.0% of under eighteens and none of those over 64.

== Education ==
It is within the Oberon School District.
