= Fort Totten, North Dakota =

- CDP
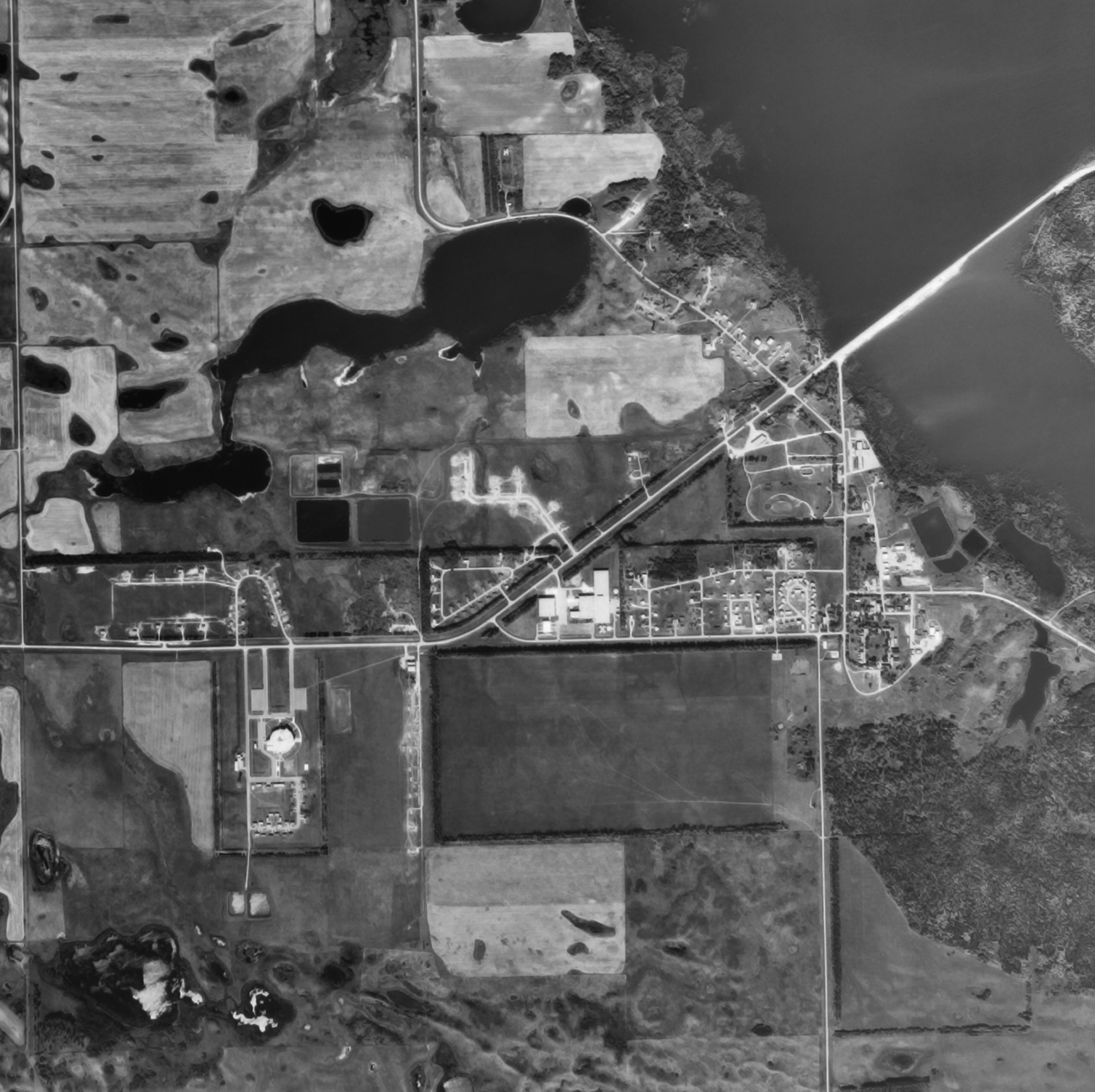
- Aerial photo of Fort Totten taken in 1997

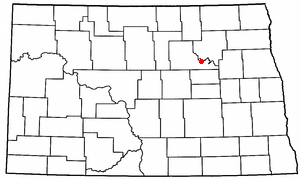
- Location of Fort Totten, North Dakota
- Coordinates: 47°58′18″N 98°59′50″W
- Country: United States
- State: North Dakota
- County: Benson

Area
  - Total: 8.85 sq mi (22.91 km^{2})
  - Land: 8.60 sq mi (22.27 km^{2})
  - Water: 0.24 sq mi (0.63 km^{2})
- Elevation: 1,555 ft (474 m)

Population (2020)
  - Total: 1,160
  - Density: 134.9/sq mi (52.08/km^{2})
- Time zone: UTC-6 (Central (CST))
  - Summer (DST): UTC-5 (CDT)
- ZIP code: 58335
- Area code: 701
- FIPS code: 38-27700
- GNIS feature ID: 2393007

Fort Totten is a census-designated place (CDP) in Benson County, North Dakota, United States. The population was 1,160 at the 2020 census. Fort Totten is located within the Spirit Lake Reservation and is the site of tribal headquarters. The reservation has a total population estimated at 6,000. Although not formally incorporated as a city, Fort Totten has the largest population of any community in Benson County.

== Geography ==
According to the United States Census Bureau, the CDP has a total area of 8.8 square miles (23 km^{2}), of which 8.6 square miles (22 km^{2}) is land and 0.2 square miles (0.52 km^{2}) (2.77%) is water.

== Demographics ==
Historical population
Census	Pop.	Note	%±
1990	867		—
2000	952		9.8%
2010	1,243		30.6%
2020	1,160		−6.7%
U.S. Decennial Census

As of the census of 2000, there were 952 people, 230 households, and 200 families residing in the CDP. The population density was 124.2 inhabitants per square mile (48.0/km^{2}). There were 255 housing units at an average density of 33.3 per square mile (12.9/km^{2}). The racial makeup of the CDP was 0.84% White, 0.11% African American, 98.84% Native American, and 0.21% from two or more races. Hispanic or Latino of any race were 0.74% of the population.

There were 230 households, out of which 54.8% had children under the age of 18 living with them, 28.7% were married couples living together, 43.9% had a female householder with no husband present, and 13.0% were non-families. 10.4% of all households were made up of individuals, and 3.9% had someone living alone who was 65 years of age or older. The average household size was 4.14 and the average family size was 4.23.

In the CDP, the population was spread out, with 49.4% under the age of 18, 11.8% from 18 to 24, 23.8% from 25 to 44, 12.1% from 45 to 64, and 2.9% who were 65 years of age or older. The median age was 18 years. For every 100 females, there were 103.4 males. For every 100 females age 18 and over, there were 89.8 males.

The median income for a household in the CDP was $15,395, and the median income for a family was $15,774. Males had a median income of $20,179 versus $19,063 for females. The per capita income for the CDP was $5,165. About 51.2% of families and 53.0% of the population were below the poverty line, including 57.8% of those under age 18 and 50.0% of those age 65 or over.

By 2010, the population in Fort Totten had increased to 1,243.

== Education ==
Much of the community is in the Fort Totten Public School District 30. A portion is in the Oberon School District.

== Sites of interest ==
- Fort Totten State Historic Site is a fort built after the American Civil War by the United States Army to protect European-American settlers in the area. It was also used as the site of the Devil's Lake Indian Agency (the original name of the reservation). Later the fort was adapted for use as an Indian boarding school, one of several run by the federal government via the Bureau of Indian Affairs.

Today it is preserved as a state historic site, and it is listed on the National Register of Historic Places. The structure has been adapted for use as a bed and breakfast and a community theatre.

- White Horse Hill National Game Preserve is a National Wildlife Refuge commissioned by Theodore Roosevelt.

== Climate ==
This climatic region is typified by large seasonal temperature differences, with warm to hot (and often humid) summers and cold (sometimes severely cold) winters. According to the Köppen Climate Classification system, Elm Creek has a humid continental climate, abbreviated "Dfb" on climate maps.
