= Normania Township, Benson County, North Dakota =

Civil township in North Dakota, U.S.

Coordinates: 48°13′30″N 99°17′31″W

Normania Township is a civil township in Benson County, North Dakota, United States. As of the 2000 census, its population was 56.
