= Wood Lake Township, Benson County, North Dakota =

Civil township in North Dakota, U.S.

Coordinates: 47°54′00″N 98°53′01″W

Wood Lake Township is a civil township in Benson County, North Dakota, United States. As of the 2000 census, its population was 440. Wood Lake Township is the second most populous township in Benson County, after Mission Township.
