= Isabel Township, Benson County, North Dakota =

Civil township in North Dakota, U.S.

Coordinates: 48°04′00″N 99°37′01″W

Isabel Township, is a civil township in Benson County, North Dakota, United States. As of the 2000 census, its population was 70.

== History ==
On October 20, 1939, a lost pet crow belonging to farmer Ben Alberts from near Brooks, Alberta was shot dead by Isabel rancher J. H. Wortman, after having travelled 800 miles south. Identification of the pet was possible through his name tag. He became lost south because he tried to migrate south.

In 1923, the town had a church.

The now-abandoned Isabel Country School once existed in the area.
