= Leeds Township, Benson County, North Dakota =

Civil township in North Dakota, U.S.

Coordinates: 48°19′36″N 99°23′38″W

Leeds Township is a civil township in Benson County, North Dakota, United States. As of the 2000 census, its population was 83.
