= Butte Valley Township, Benson County, North Dakota =

Township in Benson County, North Dakota

Coordinates: 48°07′00″N 99°29′01″W

Butte Valley Township is a civil township in Benson County, North Dakota, United States. As of the 2000 census, its population was 87.
