= Bertil W. Benson =

American politician

Bertil Wilhelm Benson (June 2, 1843 – October 28, 1923) was an American politician who was a Democratic member of the Dakota Territory House of Representatives and the namesake of Benson County, North Dakota.

== Biography ==
Benson was born in Skien, Norway in 1843 to Torkel Benson and Kern K. Anderson. He was one of five children. In 1854, Benson moved with his family to La Crosse, Wisconsin, and worked at a local dry goods store. He later moved to Valley City, which was then in Dakota Territory, where he served as vice president of the National Bank of Valley City.

Benson served a term in the territorial legislature in 1883 and 1884, and was influential in the formation of Benson County.

Benson married Mary Hubbard Gould on August 15, 1871. In 1889, he moved to Fairhaven, Washington, where he established a name for himself in real estate.

Benson died in Eastsound, Washington on October 28, 1923.
