= Spirit Lake Tribe =

Native American tribal nation in North Dakota

Spirit Lake Dakota Tribe
Mni Wakan Oyate
- Location of Spirit Lake Reservation

Total population
- 7,256 enrolled members

Regions with significant populations
- United States (North Dakota)

Languages
- English, Dakota

Religion
- Traditional Dakota, Christianity (incl. syncretistic forms)

Related ethnic groups
- Assiniboine, Stoney (Nakoda), and other Siouan peoples

The Spirit Lake Tribe (in Santee Dakota: Mniwakaƞ Oyate, also spelt as Mni Wakan Oyate, formerly known as Devils Lake Sioux Tribe) is a federally recognized tribe based on the Spirit Lake Dakota Reservation located in east-central North Dakota on the southern shores of Devils Lake. It is made up of people of the Pabaksa (Iháŋkthuŋwaŋna), Sisseton (Sisíthuŋwaŋ) and Wahpeton (Waȟpéthuŋwaŋ) bands of the Dakota tribe. Established in 1867 in a treaty between Sisseton-Wahpeton Bands and the United States government, the reservation, at 47°54′38″N 98°53′01″W, consists of 1,283.777 square kilometres (495.669 sq mi) of land area, primarily in Benson and Eddy counties. Smaller areas extend into Ramsey, Wells and Nelson counties.

According to the tribal enrollment office in 2014, the tribe had 7,256 enrolled members. At the time of the U.S. 2010 census, 3,587 members out of a total of 4,238 people (including non-tribal members) were residing on the reservation. The unemployment rate was 47.3% in 2000. The largest community on the reservation is Fort Totten.

== Naming ==
Their name was originally the Devils Lake Sioux Tribe, and its reservation was originally called the Fort Totten Indian Reservation. In the 1970s, the tribe was briefly renamed the Sisseton-Wahpeton of North Dakota, which caused confusion with the Sisseton-Wahpeton of South Dakota, whose reservation also extends into North Dakota. In 1993, the current name of the tribe and reservation was officially adopted.

The name "Devils Lake" is a calque of the Dakota words mni (water) wak’áŋ (literally "pure source", also translated as "spirit" or "sacred"). The Dakota consider it holy because they believe it is the home of the underwater serpent Unktehi. The Dakota name is reflected in the name of the Spirit Lake Tribe and the nearby town of Minnewaukan. European-American settlers misconstrued this name to mean "Bad Spirit Lake", or "Devils Lake". The "bad" referred to the high salinity of the lake, making it unfit to drink, and "spirit" meant the mirages often seen across the water. The Christian concept of the devil is not present in Dakota philosophy.

== Environment ==
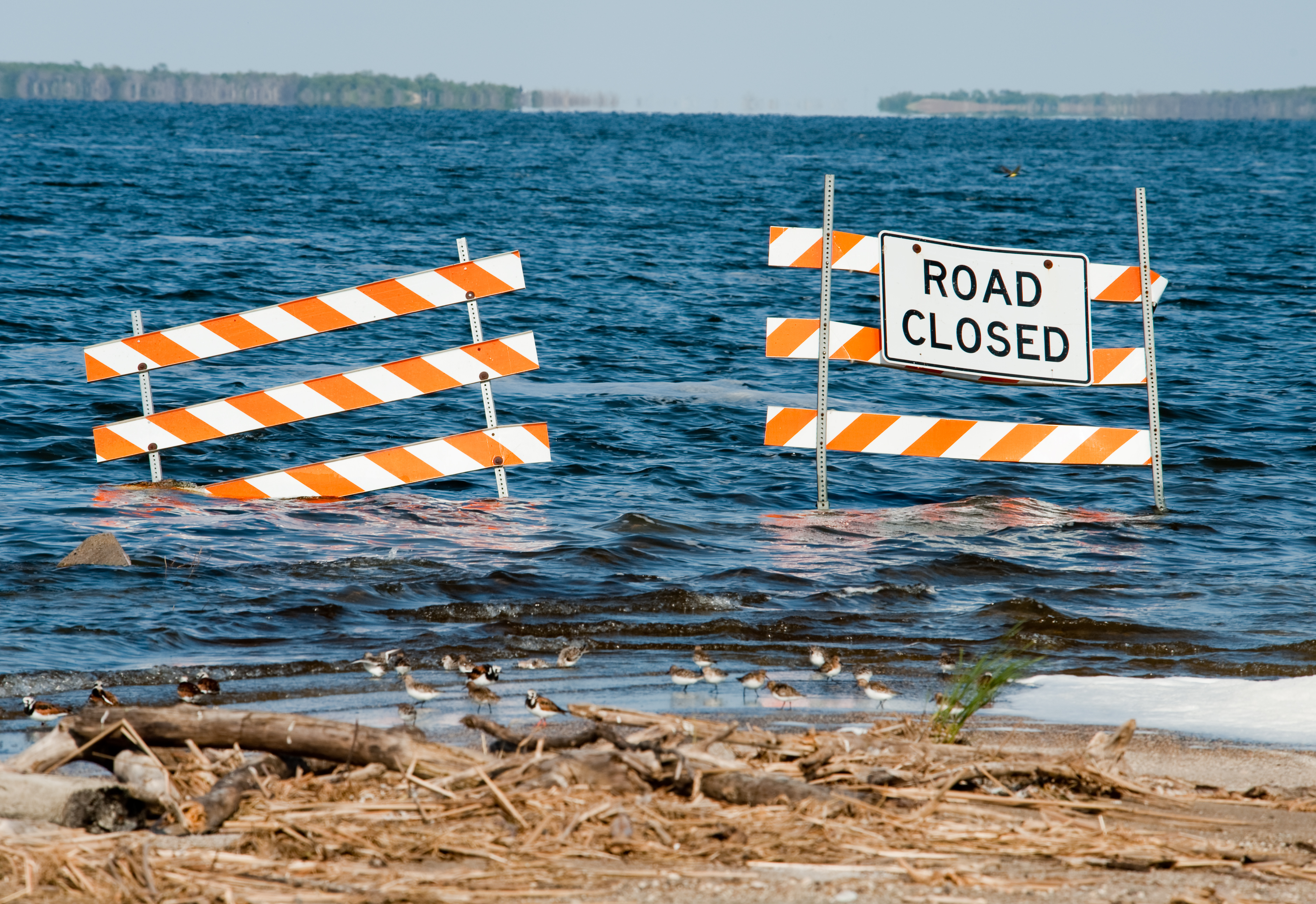
(Devils Lake, ND, June 5, 2009) A road is covered with water from Devils Lake, which has been steadily rising for the last several years, threatening homes and businesses in the area

The reservation of the tribe is located on the southern shore of Devils Lake, which has been historically the territory of the Dakota people. The Sisseton, Wahpeton, and Cut-Head bands of Dakotas were relocated to the Spirit Lake Reservation as a result of the 1867 treaty with the United States that established a reservation for Dakotas who had not been forcibly relocated to Crow Creek Reservation in what is now called South Dakota.

Because Devils Lake is a closed-basin watershed, the reservation has suffered increasingly frequent episodes of flooding since the 1990s. It has lost homes, land and economic opportunities due to the severity of this problem. Tribal chairperson, Myra Pearson, appealed in the 21st century to President Barack Obama and his White House for assistance. Since then tribal representatives have engaged with a multi-agency task force led by Federal Emergency Management Agency officials to develop a recovery plan. It was published in 2010 and includes economic and cultural development goals in addition to strategies to combat the flooding.

== Government ==
=== Historical ===
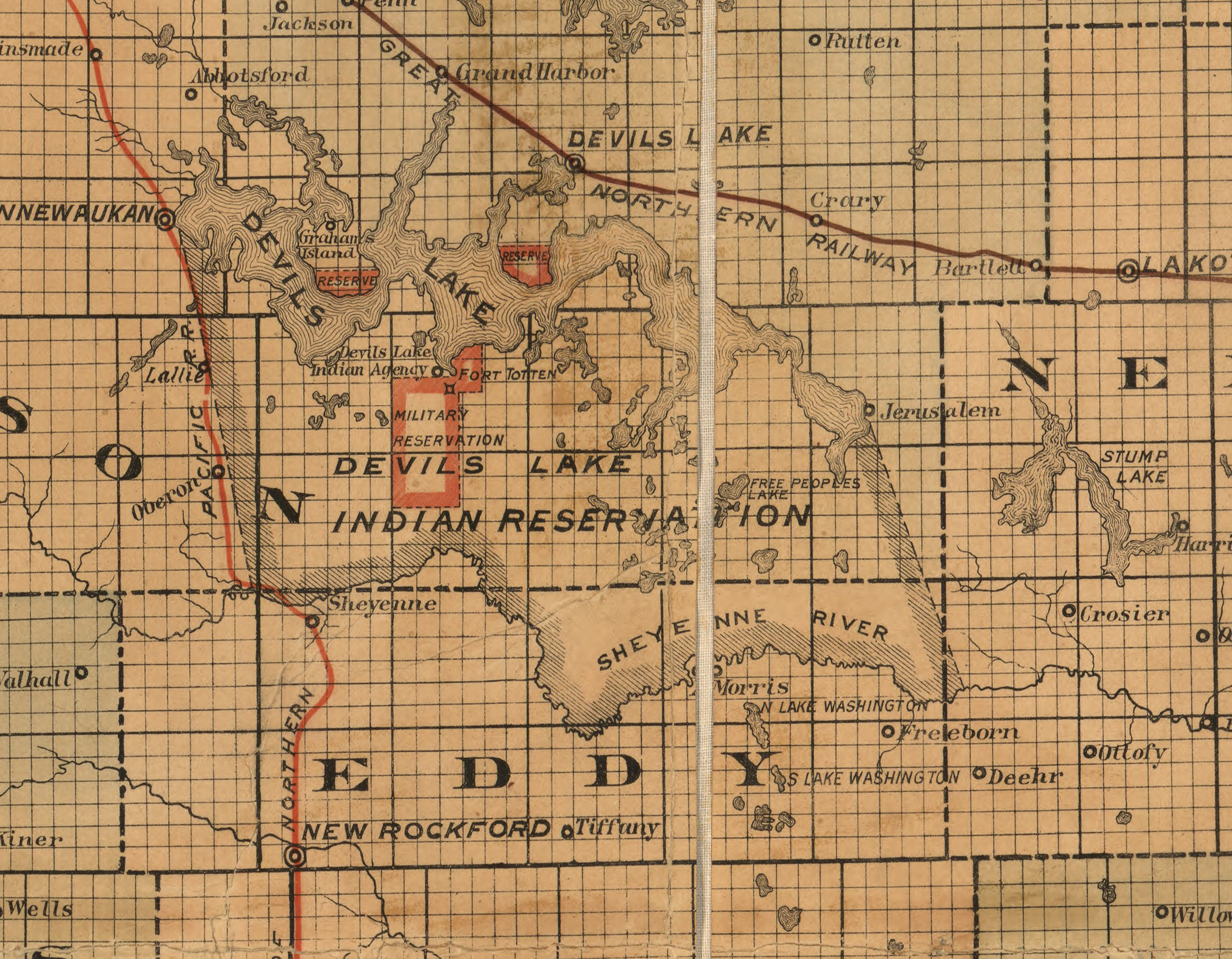
The reservation boundaries in 1892

Prior to the reservation era, Dakota tribal societies were without social classes and government was democratic and highly decentralized. An individual's status was based on their ability to serve and perform and leaders existed to serve the will of the people. Fraternal societies played a role in maintaining a government structure known as the council and prior to the reservation era, no single person was in charge of decision-making.

Following the Dakota War of 1862, many long lines of hereditary leadership ceased to exist as several bands of Sisseton and Wahpeton were forced to flee Minnesota into various locations throughout the Dakotas. Other leaders were killed, deposed or replaced by those chosen by the United States government to act as spokesperson. The U.S. government and the Sisseton and Wahpeton bands of Dakota signed a treaty in 1867 that established the Fort Totten Reservation. The name was later changed to the Devils Lake Sioux Reservation. In 1996, the Spirit Lake Tribe changed the name to a more correct translation of Mni Wakan.

Historical leadership

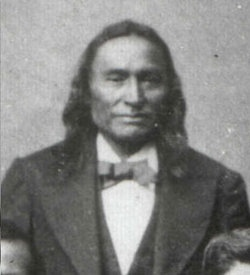
Chief Wanata II, also known as Chief Wanataan II, 1828–1897

- Standing Buffalo 1833–1864.

Standing Buffalo was born about 1833 near the headwaters of the Minnesota River. His father was Wichahpihiteton (Star Face), the leader of a Sisseton band. During the Dakota War of 1862, Standing Buffalo opposed the fighting. He died in a battle with the Gros Ventre and Assiniboine on June 5, 1871.

- Gabriel Renville (Ti'wakan) 1880–1890.

When the Dakota War of 1862 began, Renville helped to organize a soldier's lodge that opposed the fighting. Renville was not a hereditary leader but was appointed leader by the American government after serving as a scout for three years. He helped organize the new Sisseton reservation after signing the treaty of 1867. He served as chief of the Sisseton and Wahpeton on the Spirit Lake reservation throughout the 1880s and 1890s.

- Sipto (Bead) 1834–1921.

Sipto was a hereditary chief of the Abdowapusikiya (Back Drying) Band of the Sisseton. His father, Hoksinawasteka (Goodboy, 1805–1890) was the son of Standing Buffalo and related to Wanataan. When Standing Buffalo died, Hoksinawaste was next in line to be chief, but stepped aside for Sipto. He was baptized Adam Sipto and was the last chief on the reservation. He is buried in St. Michael Cemetery.

- Cantemaza (Ironheart) 1822–1896.

Hereditary leader of the Wahpeton, his father was Mahpiya Wicasta (Cloudman). He was elected Elder of the Wood Lake Presbyterian Church in 1883 using the name Adam Ignatius Ironheart. He was able to locate his war-scattered extended family and moved back to the old reservation at Granite Falls, Minnesota to reunite with them in 1885.

- Wanataan II 1828–1897.

Waanatan II was born in 1828 to a Sisseton mother who was related to Standing Buffalo. He is buried in St. Michael Cemetery.

- Tiowaste (Good House) 1825–1919.

Tiowaste was not a hereditary leader but was appointed leader by the American government on May 23, 1868. His mother was related to Standing Buffalo and his father was French.

=== Contemporary ===
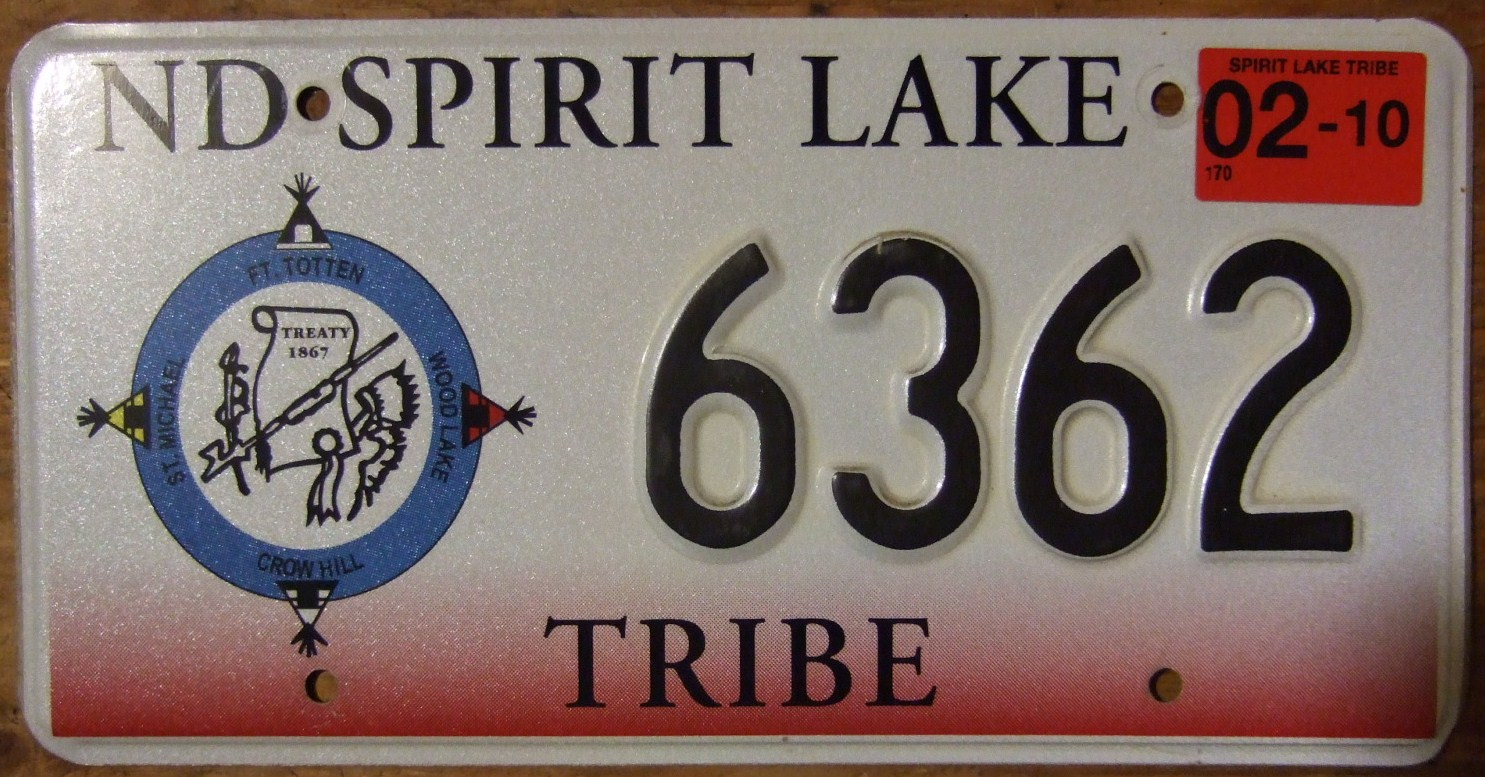
Spirit Lake Tribe license plate

The tribe has a written constitution and an elected government, with a chairman and tribal council. In 1944, the tribe submitted its constitution for ratification and was approved by the Bureau of Indian Affairs and the tribal headquarters is at Fort Totten.

The current chairperson is Lonna Street, whose term began in 2023.

Contemporary leadership

- Charlie Black Bird (1894–1968). Served from 1946 to 1957.
- Jerome Abraham (1905–1978).
- Ernest Smith (1912–1961). Served from 1955 to 1957.
- Louis Goodhouse, served from 1957 to 1972. Grandson of Tiowaste.
- Claude "Red Hail" Longie, served from 1971 to 1972.
- Evelyn Young, born 1931. Served from 1972 to 1973.
- Carl Mckay, born 1948. Served from 1974 to 1981, 1985–1990. Descendant of Tiowaste.
- Paul Little, (1930–1996). Served from 1981 to 1982.
- Dan Duboise, born 1921. Served from 1980 to 1982.
- Ila Rae Mckay (Hintunkasan Wastewin, Pretty Weasel Woman), born 1959. Served from 1990 to 1991. Descendant of Tiowaste.
- Peter Belgarde, born 1994. Served 1991–1995.
- Skip Longie, served 2000–2004.
- Roger Yankton Sr., served 2012–2013.
- Russ McDonald, served 2014.
- Myra Pearson, served 1996–1999, 2005–2011, 2015–2019.
- Peggy Cavanaugh, served 2019–2020.
- Douglas Yankton, served 2020–2023.
- Lonna (Jackson) Street, served 2023–present.

=== Child welfare ===
Beginning in 2012, tribal and federal authorities focused on reducing child sexual abuse, which was identified as endemic on the reservation. For years both tribal and federal law enforcement officials had failed to prosecute such crimes. The reservation residents include a high number of registered sex offenders, some of whom have responsibility for children. Officials suggest that poverty and alcohol abuse have contributed to the problems. Kind Hearted Woman (2013) is a PBS Frontline documentary about Robin Poor Bear, a woman on the Spirit Lake Reservation, and the severe problems of sexual abuse and violence there.

On October 1, 2012, the Bureau of Indian Affairs (BIA) took over the tribe's social services program to strengthen protection of children. It investigated 100 reported cases of such abuse in the first month. In February 2013, the two North Dakota senators and a representative met with tribal officials and members at a town hall meeting at Spirit Lake to discuss reforms underway, including fingerprinting of all adults living with foster children (a requirement that had not been satisfied before). Because of listening sessions on the reservation, the Administration for Children and Families (U.S. Department of Health and Human Services) developed seven priority recommendations to be addressed by child welfare stakeholders at the Spirit Lake Reservation. Included was a recommendation for the Spirit Lake Tribal Social Services Agency and BIA to jointly develop policies and procedures that encompass all aspects of child welfare services including that foster homes must comply with federal and state safety checks, including background checks on all adults residing in the home. As a result of the exposure of crimes against children on the reservation, the Native American Children's Safety Act enacted in 2016 amends the Indian Child Protection and Family Violence Prevention Act to further ensure children's safety by requiring Indian Tribes to conduct background checks before placing children in foster care.

In February 2019, it was announced that the tribe had successfully completed steps to regain full control of the tribal child welfare program. Chairwoman Myra Pearson said, "The transition has been a work in progress but tribal leaders, employees and the community are determined to protect the children." She also said it was vitally important for the tribe regain control because children were placed outside of the community while the program was controlled by the BIA; in order for the children to maintain cultural ties, they need to be immersed in their culture. The tribe is encouraging community members to study social work at Cankdeska Cikana Community College and they are also working with outside organizations such as the Annie E. Casey Foundation to establish relationships with specialists in the field.

== Communities ==
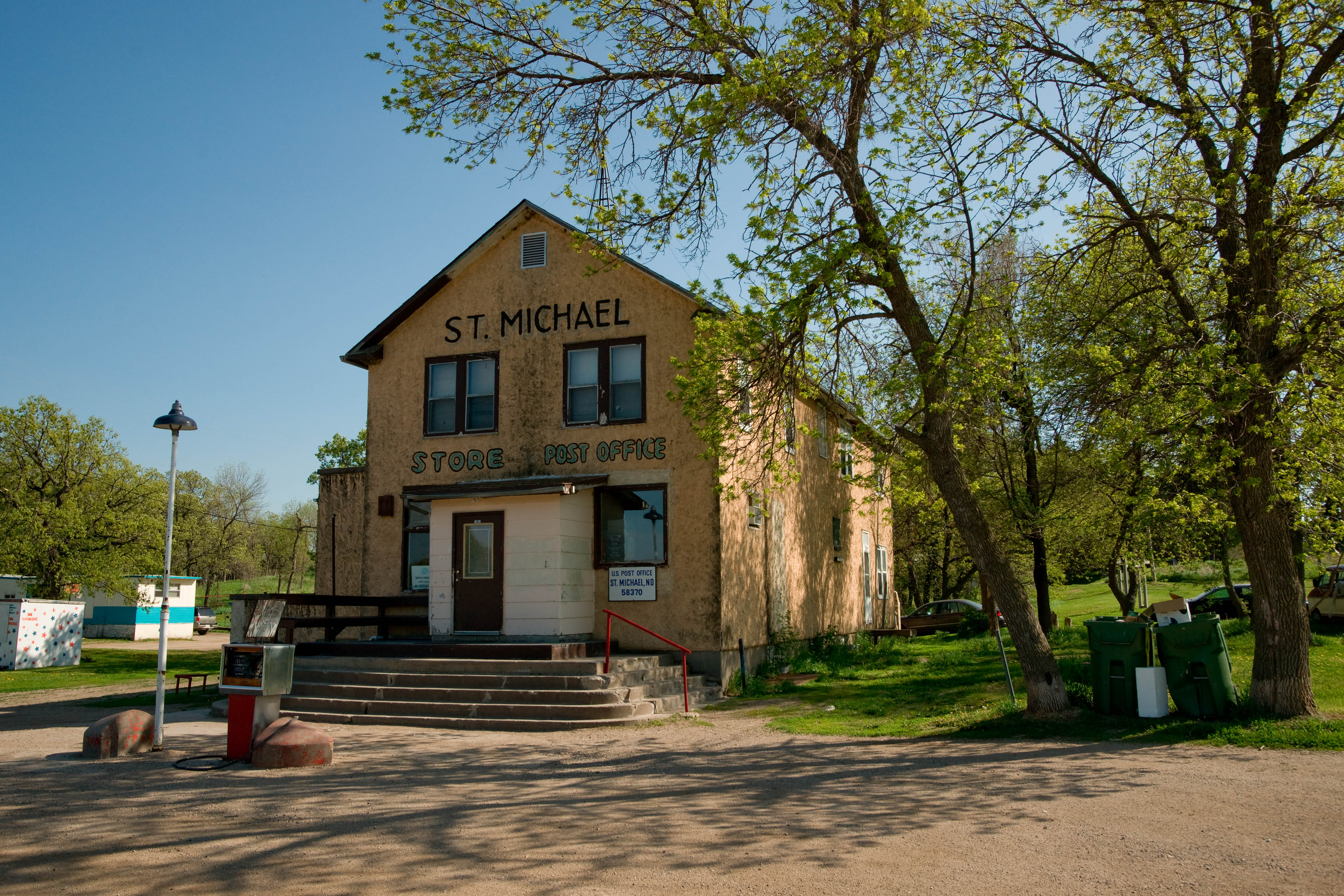
The General Store and Post Office in Saint Michael, ND

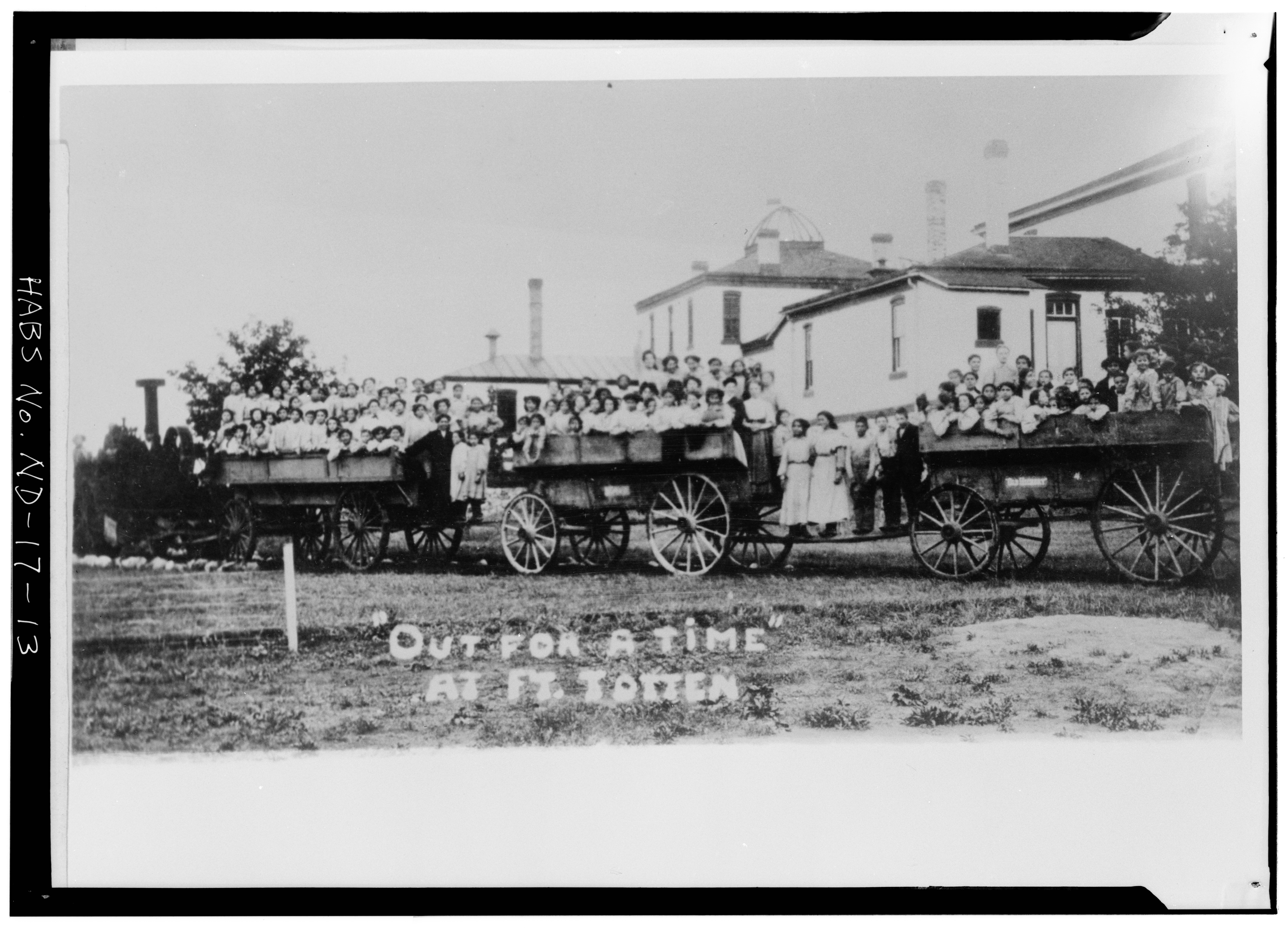
School children enjoying wagonride at Fort Totten, late 19th or early 20th century

Fort Totten is the reservation's economic and government center. The tribal administration, tribal college and Spirit Lake Consulting offices are located in the community. The tribe's Vocational Rehabilitation program works to assist tribal members in finding employment.

- Crow Hill District, Crow Hill, North Dakota
- Fort Totten District, Fort Totten, North Dakota
- Mission District, St. Michael, North Dakota
- Woodlake District, Tokio, North Dakota

The historic village of Cantemaza's Wahpeton bands was located north of Warwick, ND, near the edge of East Devils Lake. The villages of Tiowaste and Waanatan's Sisituwan bands were located at present-day St. Michael. Historically the village of Matocatka (Left Bear)'s Wahpeton bands was at Woodlake and Wahacankaduta (Scarlet Shield)'s Pabaksa (Ihanktonwan) bands was located at Crow Hill.

Map of the Spirit Lake Reservation and nearby reservations (In blue).

== Economy ==
American bison grazing at the White Horse Hill National Game Preserve located on the reservation

The Sioux Manufacturing Corporation, a manufacturer of composite armed armors, is located on the reservation. It is 100% owned by the tribe and is one of the oldest tribal-owned businesses in the country. It opened in 1973 and by 1989, the tribe had purchased the last remaining shares of the company owned by the Brunswick Corporation, thereby gaining full ownership. Currently, 75% of the workforce is Native American and their products are created for the United States Department of Defense out of their 250,000 square foot manufacturing facility.

Additional visitor attractions at the reservation are the White Horse Hill National Game Preserve and the Fort Totten State Historic Site, which is listed on the National Register of Historic Places. The Spirit Lake Tribe operates Cankdeska Cikana Community College, a tribal college established in the 1970s. The two-year college provides classes in subject areas needed by the reservation and to prepare students for other jobs, as well as strengthening their Dakota culture and language. The radio station KABU 90.7 serves the Spirit Lake tribe.

=== Spirit Lake Casino and Resort ===
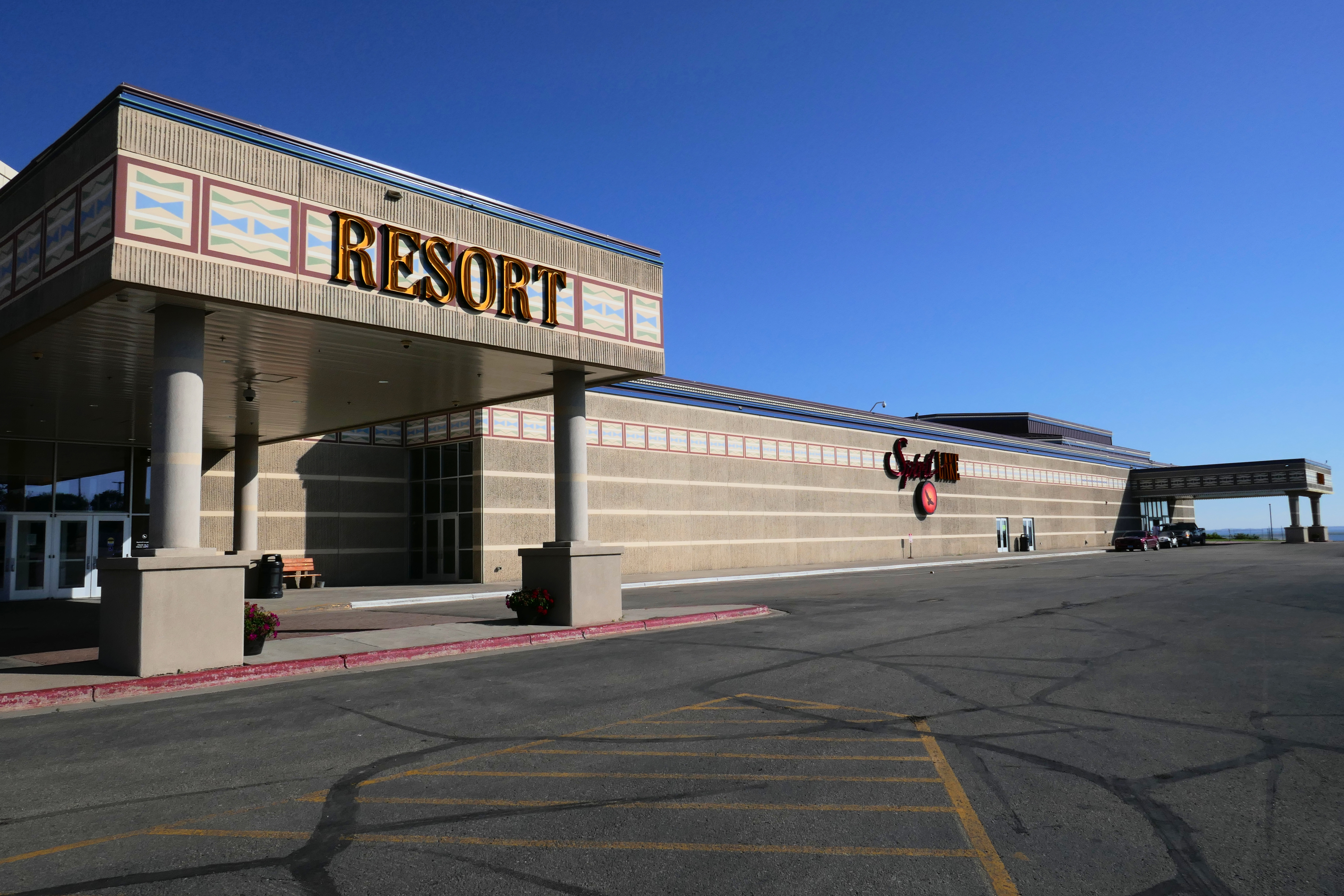
Spirit Lake Casino and Resort in St. Michael

Since the late 20th century, the tribe has operated various gaming facilities on its reservation to generate revenues for the welfare of its people. The first casino opened in St. Michael, North Dakota with the passage of the Indian Gaming Regulatory Act in 1988 when the tribe signed an agreement with the Governor of North Dakota. The first facility initially employed 35 individuals, most of whom were tribal members. Later, in 1994, the tribe renovated a gymnasium and added a second casino in Tokio, ND. This development created employment for 191 people. The tribe had closed both of those two smaller casinos in 1996 and on June 1, 1996, after a $7 million investment opened the new 49,000 square foot casino at its present location.

The present Spirit Lake Casino and Resort is owned and operated by the tribe and is located in St. Michael, North Dakota. The casino has brought new sources of income and helped to stabilize the tribal economy employing over 300 people with 75% being Native American. It is a multi-story facility comprising 82,000 square feet of Gaming & Entertainment Floor and 112,300 square feet of Resort and Hotel on a remote island connected by a 2-lane highway off of Mission Bay, North Dakota. After numerous renovations since its opening, it now has almost 150 hotel rooms, a 1,000-seat auditorium, a banquet hall, RV park, gift shop and a four-story aquatic center. In 2011 more job opportunities were added when the Spirit Lake Marina and Spirit Lake Grocery store were added to the grounds of the casino. The marina hosts a fishing tournament every summer.
