= Minnewaukan, North Dakota =

- City
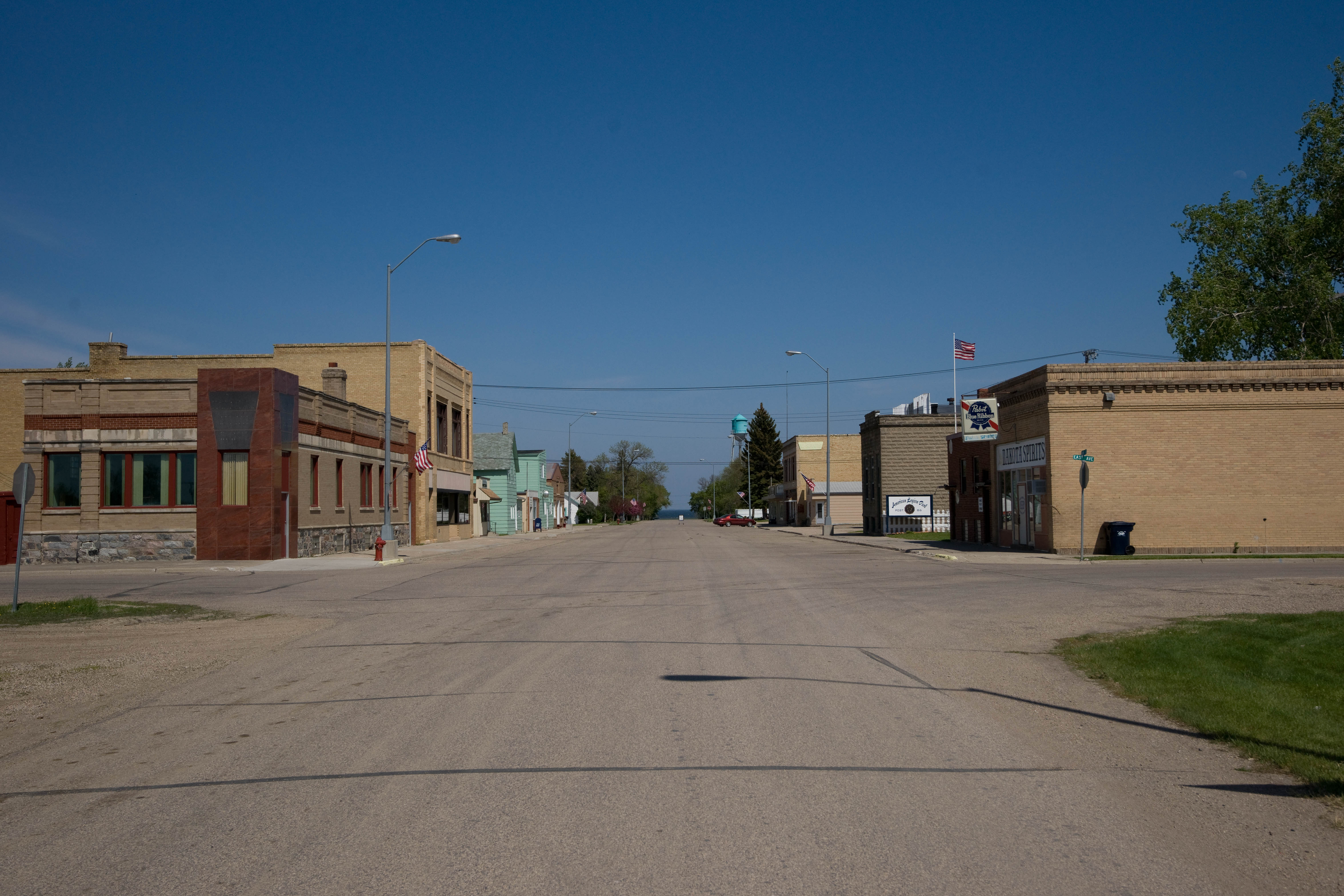
- Minnewaukan, North Dakota

- Logo
- Motto: "Little City By The Big Lake"
- Location of Minnewaukan, North Dakota
- Coordinates: 48°04′10″N 99°15′00″W
- Country: United States
- State: North Dakota
- County: Benson
- Founded: 1884

Area
  - Total: 0.48 sq mi (1.25 km^{2})
  - Land: 0.48 sq mi (1.25 km^{2})
  - Water: 0 sq mi (0.00 km^{2})
- Elevation: 1,463 ft (446 m)

Population (2020)
  - Total: 199
  - Estimate (2022): 188
  - Density: 411.7/sq mi (158.96/km^{2})
- Time zone: UTC-6 (Central (CST))
  - Summer (DST): UTC-5 (CDT)
- ZIP code: 58351
- Area code: 701
- FIPS code: 38-53220
- GNIS feature ID: 1036164
- Website: minnewaukan.com

Minnewaukan is a city in Benson County, North Dakota, United States. It serves as the county seat and is fourth largest city in the county, after Fort Totten, Leeds, and Maddock. The population was 199 at the 2020 census. Minnewaukan was founded in 1884.

== Etymology ==
Minnewaukan comes from Mniwakaƞ, a Sioux language word meaning "Spirit Water". The town shares this name with the traditional Dakota language of the adjacent Spirit Lake Tribe, Mniwakaƞ Oyate.

== Geography ==
According to the United States Census Bureau, the city has a total area of 0.27 square miles (0.70 km^{2}), all land.

== Demographics ==
Historical population
Census	Pop.	Note	%±
1900	432		—
1910	510		18.1%
1920	564		10.6%
1930	480		−14.9%
1940	521		8.5%
1950	443		−15.0%
1960	420		−5.2%
1970	496		18.1%
1980	461		−7.1%
1990	401		−13.0%
2000	318		−20.7%
2010	224		−29.6%
2020	199		−11.2%
2022 (est.)	188		−5.5%
U.S. Decennial Census; 2020 Census

=== 2010 census ===
As of the census of 2010, there were 224 people, 116 households, and 64 families living in the city. The population density was 829.6 inhabitants per square mile (320.3/km^{2}). There were 178 housing units at an average density of 659.3 per square mile (254.6/km^{2}). The racial makeup of the city was 84.8% White, 11.2% Native American, 0.9% from other races, and 3.1% from two or more races. Hispanic or Latino of any race were 1.3% of the population.

There were 116 households, of which 12.9% had children under the age of 18 living with them, 47.4% were married couples living together, 5.2% had a female householder with no husband present, 2.6% had a male householder with no wife present, and 44.8% were non-families. 37.9% of all households were made up of individuals, and 9.4% had someone living alone who was 65 years of age or older. The average household size was 1.93 and the average family size was 2.53.

The median age in the city was 50.7 years. 12.1% of residents were under the age of 18; 4.4% were between the ages of 18 and 24; 24.5% were from 25 to 44; 39.2% were from 45 to 64; and 19.6% were 65 years of age or older. The gender makeup of the city was 50.4% male and 49.6% female.

=== 2000 census ===
As of the census of 2000, there were 318 people, 148 households, and 87 families living in the city. The population density was 1,157.0 inhabitants per square mile (446.7/km^{2}). There were 199 housing units at an average density of 724.1 per square mile (279.6/km^{2}). The racial makeup of the city was 86.16% White, 9.75% Native American, 1.26% from other races, and 2.83% from two or more races. Hispanic or Latino of any race were 1.57% of the population.

There were 148 households, out of which 26.4% had children under the age of 18 living with them, 48.0% were married couples living together, 3.4% had a female householder with no husband present, and 41.2% were non-families. 37.2% of all households were made up of individuals, and 15.5% had someone living alone who was 65 years of age or older. The average household size was 2.15 and the average family size was 2.83.

In the city, the population was spread out, with 22.3% under the age of 18, 4.1% from 18 to 24, 26.4% from 25 to 44, 28.9% from 45 to 64, and 18.2% who were 65 years of age or older. The median age was 42 years. For every 100 females, there were 107.8 males. For every 100 females age 18 and over, there were 105.8 males.

The median income for a household in the city was $27,250, and the median income for a family was $37,000. Males had a median income of $30,833 versus $17,500 for females. The per capita income for the city was $16,076. About 5.4% of families and 8.5% of the population were below the poverty line, including 16.2% of those under age 18 and 3.1% of those age 65 or over.

== Notable people ==
- Maxwell Anderson, playwright
- Pamela Anderson, member of the North Dakota House of Representatives
- Quentin Anderson, literary critic and cultural historian at Columbia University
