= List of counties in North Dakota =

Counties of North Dakota
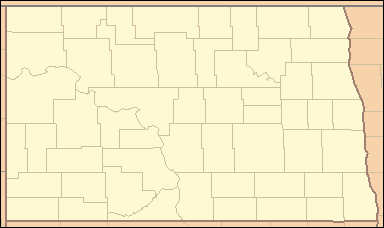
- Location: State of North Dakota
- Number: 53
- Populations: 628 (Slope) – 201,794 (Cass)
- Areas: 632 square miles (1,640 km^{2}) (Eddy) – 2,742 square miles (7,100 km^{2}) (McKenzie)
- Government: County government
- Subdivisions: Cities, unincorporated communities, Indian reservations, census-designated places

This is a list of counties in North Dakota. There are 53 counties in the U.S. state of North Dakota.

The Federal Information Processing Standard (FIPS) code, which is used by the United States government to uniquely identify states and counties, is provided with each entry. North Dakota's code is 38, which when combined with any county code would be written as 38XXX. The FIPS code for each county links to census data for that county.

== List ==
ND counties, shaded by population

County	FIPS code	County seat	Est.	Etymology	Population	Area	Map
Adams County	001	Hettinger	April 17, 1907	John Quincy Adams (1848-1919), a railroad agent and cousin of the former president who was instrumental in having the Chicago, Milwaukee and St. Paul Railway built through North Dakota	2,275	988 sq mi (2,559 km^{2})	State map highlighting Adams County
Barnes County	003	Valley City	January 4, 1873	Dakota Territory judge Alanson H. Barnes (1818-1890)	10,573	1,492 sq mi (3,864 km^{2})	State map highlighting Barnes County
Benson County	005	Minnewaukan	March 9, 1883	Dakota territorial legislator Bertil W. Benson	5,759	1,389 sq mi (3,597 km^{2})	State map highlighting Benson County
Billings County	007	Medora	February 10, 1879	Frederick H. Billings (1823–1890), who was president of the Northern Pacific Railroad	1,071	1,152 sq mi (2,984 km^{2})	State map highlighting Billings County
Bottineau County	009	Bottineau	January 4, 1873	Named for frontiersman Pierre Bottineau (1814-1895)	6,284	1,669 sq mi (4,323 km^{2})	State map highlighting Bottineau County
Bowman County	011	Bowman	March 8, 1883	Dakota territorial legislator Edward M. Bowman	2,762	1,162 sq mi (3,010 km^{2})	State map highlighting Bowman County
Burke County	013	Bowbells	July 12, 1910	John Burke (1859-1937), tenth Governor of North Dakota	2,132	1,104 sq mi (2,859 km^{2})	State map highlighting Burke County
Burleigh County	015	Bismarck	January 4, 1873	Walter A. Burleigh (1820–1896), territorial delegate to Congress	103,251	1,633 sq mi (4,229 km^{2})	State map highlighting Burleigh County
Cass County	017	Fargo	January 4, 1873	George Washington Cass (1810–1888), who was the president of the Northern Pacific Railroad	201,794	1,766 sq mi (4,574 km^{2})	State map highlighting Cass County
Cavalier County	019	Langdon	January 4, 1873	Charles Cavalier (1818-1902), French fur trapper and one of the area's original settlers	3,497	1,489 sq mi (3,856 km^{2})	State map highlighting Cavalier County
Dickey County	021	Ellendale	March 5, 1881	Dakota territorial legislator George H. Dickey	4,895	1,131 sq mi (2,929 km^{2})	State map highlighting Dickey County
Divide County	023	Crosby	November 8, 1910	Named because it was created upon the division of Williams County	2,110	1,259 sq mi (3,261 km^{2})	State map highlighting Divide County
Dunn County	025	Manning	March 9, 1883	John P. Dunn (1839-1917), an early civic leader of Bismarck, who opened the first drugstore in North Dakota	4,058	2,010 sq mi (5,206 km^{2})	State map highlighting Dunn County
Eddy County	027	New Rockford	March 31, 1885	Ezra B. Eddy (1830-1855), a Fargo banker and one of the territory's wealthiest citizens	2,329	632 sq mi (1,637 km^{2})	State map highlighting Eddy County
Emmons County	029	Linton	February 10, 1879	James Emmons (1845-1919), an early entrepreneur and businessman who operated the first steamboat across the Missouri River in Bismarck	3,215	1,510 sq mi (3,911 km^{2})	State map highlighting Emmons County
Foster County	031	Carrington	January 4, 1873	Either James S. Foster (1828-1890) and George I. Foster (1837-1912), brother, and prominent farmers during the territorial days	3,212	635 sq mi (1,645 km^{2})	State map highlighting Foster County
Golden Valley County	033	Beach	September 19, 1912	Named for either promotional reasons or for the Golden Valley Land and Cattle Company	1,808	1,002 sq mi (2,595 km^{2})	State map highlighting Golden Valley County
Grand Forks County	035	Grand Forks	January 4, 1873	Named for Grand Forks, North Dakota, which in turn was named for its location at the intersection of the Red Lake River and the Red River of the North	74,501	1,438 sq mi (3,724 km^{2})	State map highlighting Grand Forks County
Grant County	037	Carson	November 7, 1916	Ulysses S. Grant (1822–1885), eighteenth U.S. President	2,206	1,660 sq mi (4,299 km^{2})	State map highlighting Grant County
Griggs County	039	Cooperstown	February 18, 1881	Alexander Griggs (1838-1903), a steamboat captain and founder of Grand Forks, North Dakota	2,239	708 sq mi (1,834 km^{2})	State map highlighting Griggs County
Hettinger County	041	Mott	March 9, 1883	Mathias K. Hettinger (1810-1890), the father-in-law of Erastus A. Williams, the North Dakota Speaker of the House during that session	2,492	1,132 sq mi (2,932 km^{2})	State map highlighting Hettinger County
Kidder County	043	Steele	January 4, 1873	Jefferson Parrish Kidder (1816-1883), territorial delegate to the 44th Congress and 45th Congresses	2,393	1,352 sq mi (3,502 km^{2})	State map highlighting Kidder County
LaMoure County	045	LaMoure	January 4, 1873	Dakota territorial legislator and North Dakota state legislator Judson LaMoure (1839-1918)	4,135	1,147 sq mi (2,971 km^{2})	State map highlighting LaMoure County
Logan County	047	Napoleon	January 4, 1873	Illinois U.S. Senator John A. Logan (1826–1886)	1,859	993 sq mi (2,572 km^{2})	State map highlighting Logan County
McHenry County	049	Towner	January 4, 1873	James McHenry (1835-1922), one of the area's original settlers	5,130	1,874 sq mi (4,854 km^{2})	State map highlighting McHenry County
McIntosh County	051	Ashley	March 9, 1883	Edward H. McIntosh (1822-1901), a member of the Territorial Legislature	2,451	975 sq mi (2,525 km^{2})	State map highlighting McIntosh County
McKenzie County	053	Watford City	March 9, 1883	Alexander McKenzie (1851-1922), party boss known in the state as "the senator-maker"	15,192	2,742 sq mi (7,102 km^{2})	State map highlighting McKenzie County
McLean County	055	Washburn	March 8, 1883	John A. McLean (1849-1916), first mayor of Bismarck, North Dakota	9,740	2,110 sq mi (5,465 km^{2})	State map highlighting McLean County
Mercer County	057	Stanton	January 14, 1875	William Henry Harrison Mercer (1844-1901), an early settler	8,441	1,045 sq mi (2,707 km^{2})	State map highlighting Mercer County
Morton County	059	Mandan	January 8, 1873	Governor of Indiana Oliver Hazard Perry Throck Morton	34,601	1,926 sq mi (4,988 km^{2})	State map highlighting Morton County
Mountrail County	061	Stanley	January 4, 1873	Joseph Mountraille, Metis voyageur and early explorer	9,395	1,824 sq mi (4,724 km^{2})	State map highlighting Mountrail County
Nelson County	063	Lakota	March 2, 1883	Dakota territorial legislator Nelson E. Nelson (1830-1913)	2,963	982 sq mi (2,543 km^{2})	State map highlighting Nelson County
Oliver County	065	Center	April 14, 1885	Dakota territorial legislator Harry S. Oliver (1855-1909)	1,898	724 sq mi (1,875 km^{2})	State map highlighting Oliver County
Pembina County	067	Cavalier	January 9, 1867	Named for the high-bush cranberries which grew wild in the area. Pembina may be from an Ojibwa phrase, anepeminan sipi, referring to the berries, as they grew in abundance around the Redberry River; it may also be from an Ojibwa word meaning meeting place. The name originally applied to the old Pembina Territory	6,568	1,119 sq mi (2,898 km^{2})	State map highlighting Pembina County
Pierce County	069	Rugby	March 11, 1887	Gilbert Ashville Pierce (1839-1901), a Governor of Dakota Territory and later a U.S. Senator from North Dakota	3,838	1,018 sq mi (2,637 km^{2})	State map highlighting Pierce County
Ramsey County	071	Devils Lake	January 4, 1873	Minnesota U.S. Senator Alexander Ramsey (1815-1903)	11,530	1,186 sq mi (3,072 km^{2})	State map highlighting Ramsey County
Ransom County	073	Lisbon	January 4, 1873	Named for locally situated Fort Ransom	5,617	863 sq mi (2,235 km^{2})	State map highlighting Ransom County
Renville County	075	Mohall	January 4, 1873	Joseph Renville, missionary and interpreter for Dakota Native Americans	2,331	875 sq mi (2,266 km^{2})	State map highlighting Renville County
Richland County	077	Wahpeton	January 4, 1873	Morgan T. Rich (1832-1898), early settler	16,731	1,437 sq mi (3,722 km^{2})	State map highlighting Richland County
Rolette County	079	Rolla	January 4, 1873	Joseph Rolette, Jr. (1820–1871), a prominent fur trapper and local political organizer	11,688	902 sq mi (2,336 km^{2})	State map highlighting Rolette County
Sargent County	081	Forman	April 9, 1883	Homer E. Sargent (1820-1900), a general manager of the Northern Pacific Railroad	3,711	859 sq mi (2,225 km^{2})	State map highlighting Sargent County
Sheridan County	083	McClusky	January 4, 1873	American Civil War officer Philip Henry Sheridan (1831–1888)	1,296	972 sq mi (2,517 km^{2})	State map highlighting Sheridan County
Sioux County	085	Fort Yates	September 3, 1914	The Native American Sioux people	3,667	1,094 sq mi (2,833 km^{2})	State map highlighting Sioux County
Slope County	087	Amidon	November 3, 1914	Topographical feature within the county known as the Missouri Slope	628	1,218 sq mi (3,155 km^{2})	State map highlighting Slope County
Stark County	089	Dickinson	February 10, 1879	George Stark (1823-1892), a vice president of the Northern Pacific Railroad	34,013	1,338 sq mi (3,465 km^{2})	State map highlighting Stark County
Steele County	091	Finley	June 2, 1883	Edward H. Steele (1846-1899), secretary-treasurer of the Red River Land Company	1,797	712 sq mi (1,844 km^{2})	State map highlighting Steele County
Stutsman County	093	Jamestown	January 4, 1873	Dakota Territorial Legislator Enos Stutsman (1826-1874)	21,414	2,222 sq mi (5,755 km^{2})	State map highlighting Stutsman County
Towner County	095	Cando	March 8, 1883	Dakota territorial legislator Oscar M. Towner (1842-1897)	2,040	1,025 sq mi (2,655 km^{2})	State map highlighting Towner County
Traill County	097	Hillsboro	January 12, 1875	Walter John Strickland Traill (1847-1932), early settler	7,920	862 sq mi (2,233 km^{2})	State map highlighting Traill County
Walsh County	099	Grafton	May 2, 1881	George H. Walsh (1868-1913), early settler and one of the founders of the University of North Dakota	10,179	1,282 sq mi (3,320 km^{2})	State map highlighting Walsh County
Ward County	101	Minot	April 14, 1885	Dakota territorial legislator Mark Ward (1844–1902)	68,233	2,013 sq mi (5,214 km^{2})	State map highlighting Ward County
Wells County	103	Fessenden	January 4, 1873	Dakota territorial legislator Edward Payson Wells (1847-1936)	3,729	1,271 sq mi (3,292 km^{2})	State map highlighting Wells County
Williams County	105	Williston	March 2, 1891	Dakota territorial legislator Erastus Appelman Williams (1850-1930)	41,767	2,071 sq mi (5,364 km^{2})	State map highlighting Williams County

== Racial / Ethnic Profile of counties in North Dakota (2020 Census) ==
Racial / Ethnic Profile of counties in North Dakota (2020 Census)
Following is a table of counties in North Dakota by race/ethnicity. The majority racial/ethnic group is coded per the key below.

Majority minority with no dominant group
Majority White
Majority Black
Majority Hispanic
Majority Asian
Majority Native American

Racial and ethnic composition of counties in North Dakota (2020 Census) (NH = Non-Hispanic) Note: the US Census treats Hispanic/Latino as an ethnic category. This table excludes Latinos from the racial categories and assigns them to a separate category. Hispanics/Latinos may be of any race.
County	Location of County	Total Population	White alone (NH)	%	Black or African American alone (NH)	%	Native American or Alaska Native alone (NH)	%	Asian alone (NH)	%	Pacific Islander alone (NH)	%	Other race alone (NH)	%	Mixed race or Multiracial (NH)	%	Hispanic or Latino (any race)	%
Adams		2,200	2,028	92.18%	12	0.55%	14	0.64%	39	1.77%	1	0.05%	0	0.00%	70	3.18%	36	1.64%
Barnes		10,853	9,964	91.81%	177	1.63%	92	0.85%	69	0.64%	2	0.02%	24	0.22%	340	3.13%	185	1.70%
Benson		5,964	2,532	42.45%	2	0.03%	3,190	53.49%	7	0.12%	0	0.00%	1	0.02%	143	2.40%	89	1.49%
Billings		945	902	95.45%	4	0.42%	3	0.32%	6	0.63%	0	0.00%	0	0.00%	8	0.85%	22	2.33%
Bottineau		6,379	5,688	89.17%	31	0.49%	197	3.09%	42	0.66%	1	0.02%	13	0.20%	266	4.17%	141	2.21%
Bowman		2,993	2,760	92.21%	0	0.00%	34	1.14%	17	0.57%	3	0.10%	0	0.00%	50	1.67%	129	4.31%
Burke		2,201	2,049	93.09%	12	0.55%	21	0.95%	12	0.55%	0	0.00%	5	0.23%	43	1.95%	59	2.68%
Burleigh		98,458	84,349	85.67%	2,227	2.26%	4,053	4.12%	1,043	1.06%	316	0.32%	210	0.21%	3,176	3.23%	3,084	3.13%
Cass		184,525	149,442	80.99%	12,761	6.92%	2,367	1.28%	6,034	3.27%	79	0.04%	459	0.25%	7,201	3.90%	6,182	3.35%
Cavalier		3,704	3,485	94.09%	2	0.05%	28	0.76%	16	0.43%	0	0.00%	15	0.40%	113	3.05%	45	1.21%
Dickey		4,999	4,572	91.46%	19	0.38%	26	0.52%	27	0.54%	0	0.00%	17	0.34%	139	2.78%	199	3.98%
Divide		2,195	2,024	92.21%	23	1.05%	17	0.77%	11	0.50%	4	0.18%	3	0.14%	60	2.73%	53	2.41%
Dunn		4,095	3,241	79.15%	23	0.56%	455	11.11%	32	0.78%	0	0.00%	10	0.24%	227	5.54%	107	2.61%
Eddy		2,347	2,102	89.56%	5	0.21%	60	2.56%	0	0.00%	0	0.00%	0	0.00%	103	4.39%	77	3.28%
Emmons		3,301	3,162	95.79%	0	0.00%	13	0.39%	12	0.36%	0	0.00%	8	0.24%	71	2.15%	35	1.06%
Foster		3,397	3,199	94.17%	7	0.21%	18	0.53%	13	0.38%	0	0.00%	6	0.18%	88	2.59%	66	1.94%
Golden Valley		1,736	1,600	92.17%	5	0.29%	12	0.69%	1	0.06%	1	0.06%	4	0.23%	65	3.74%	48	2.76%
Grand Forks		73,170	58,755	80.30%	3,009	4.11%	1,637	2.24%	2,479	3.39%	52	0.07%	169	0.23%	3,412	4.66%	3,657	5.00%
Grant		2,301	2,169	94.26%	10	0.43%	32	1.39%	11	0.48%	0	0.00%	0	0.00%	53	2.30%	26	1.13%
Griggs		2,306	2,200	95.40%	8	0.35%	12	0.52%	7	0.30%	0	0.00%	4	0.17%	51	2.21%	24	1.04%
Hettinger		2,489	2,319	93.17%	5	0.20%	42	1.69%	5	0.20%	7	0.28%	8	0.32%	69	2.77%	34	1.37%
Kidder		2,394	2,271	94.86%	3	0.13%	11	0.46%	1	0.04%	5	0.21%	0	0.00%	51	2.13%	52	2.17%
LaMoure		4,093	3,897	95.21%	6	0.15%	20	0.49%	7	0.17%	4	0.10%	10	0.24%	61	1.49%	88	2.15%
Logan		1,876	1,773	94.51%	2	0.11%	11	0.59%	0	0.00%	0	0.00%	1	0.05%	54	2.88%	35	1.87%
McHenry		5,345	5,024	93.99%	11	0.21%	27	0.51%	12	0.22%	6	0.11%	0	0.00%	167	3.12%	98	1.83%
McIntosh		2,530	2,375	93.87%	7	0.28%	5	0.20%	23	0.91%	0	0.00%	8	0.32%	59	2.33%	53	2.09%
McKenzie		14,704	10,268	69.83%	214	1.46%	1,823	12.40%	171	1.16%	5	0.03%	67	0.46%	624	4.24%	1,532	10.42%
McLean		9,771	8,372	85.68%	32	0.33%	766	7.84%	48	0.49%	7	0.07%	17	0.17%	381	3.90%	148	1.51%
Mercer		8,350	7,571	90.67%	42	0.50%	193	2.31%	43	0.51%	1	0.01%	18	0.22%	264	3.16%	218	2.61%
Morton		33,291	28,796	86.50%	462	1.39%	1,238	3.72%	171	0.51%	39	0.12%	74	0.22%	1,199	3.60%	1,312	3.94%
Mountrail		9,809	5,539	56.47%	113	1.15%	2,737	27.90%	105	1.07%	3	0.03%	34	0.35%	510	5.20%	768	7.83%
Nelson		3,015	2,844	94.33%	6	0.20%	16	0.53%	9	0.30%	1	0.03%	5	0.17%	65	2.16%	69	2.29%
Oliver		1,877	1,755	93.50%	3	0.16%	23	1.23%	5	0.27%	3	0.16%	1	0.05%	59	3.14%	28	1.49%
Pembina		6,844	6,096	89.07%	27	0.39%	133	1.94%	27	0.39%	0	0.00%	22	0.32%	296	4.32%	243	3.55%
Pierce		3,990	3,611	90.50%	36	0.90%	146	3.66%	17	0.43%	5	0.13%	10	0.25%	93	2.33%	72	1.80%
Ramsey		11,605	9,354	80.60%	73	0.63%	1,227	10.57%	72	0.62%	10	0.09%	8	0.07%	587	5.06%	274	2.36%
Ransom		5,703	5,363	94.04%	36	0.63%	18	0.32%	24	0.42%	0	0.00%	10	0.18%	123	2.16%	129	2.26%
Renville		2,282	2,146	94.04%	5	0.22%	14	0.61%	0	0.00%	0	0.00%	2	0.09%	78	3.42%	37	1.62%
Richland		16,529	14,703	88.95%	155	0.94%	433	2.62%	123	0.74%	19	0.11%	23	0.14%	499	3.02%	574	3.47%
Rolette		12,187	2,298	18.86%	13	0.11%	9,210	75.57%	23	0.19%	8	0.07%	8	0.07%	490	4.02%	137	1.12%
Sargent		3,862	3,570	92.44%	48	1.24%	8	0.21%	13	0.34%	0	0.00%	0	0.00%	132	3.42%	91	2.36%
Sheridan		1,265	1,191	94.15%	2	0.16%	11	0.87%	6	0.47%	0	0.00%	4	0.32%	41	3.24%	10	0.79%
Sioux		3,898	401	10.29%	3	0.08%	3,281	84.17%	2	0.05%	0	0.00%	0	0.00%	148	3.80%	63	1.62%
Slope		706	679	96.18%	0	0.00%	2	0.28%	0	0.00%	0	0.00%	0	0.00%	17	2.41%	8	1.13%
Stark		33,646	28,307	84.13%	1,033	3.07%	392	1.17%	344	1.02%	51	0.15%	88	0.26%	1,157	3.44%	2,274	6.76%
Steele		1,798	1,721	95.72%	3	0.17%	7	0.39%	0	0.00%	0	0.00%	0	0.00%	31	1.72%	36	2.00%
Stutsman		21,593	19,504	90.32%	444	2.06%	296	1.37%	137	0.63%	4	0.02%	24	0.11%	591	2.74%	593	2.75%
Towner		2,162	1,984	91.77%	2	0.09%	71	3.28%	10	0.46%	1	0.05%	4	0.19%	56	2.59%	34	1.57%
Traill		7,997	7,311	91.42%	48	0.60%	60	0.75%	18	0.23%	4	0.05%	10	0.13%	249	3.11%	297	3.71%
Walsh		10,563	8,676	82.14%	69	0.65%	136	1.29%	45	0.43%	0	0.00%	31	0.29%	290	2.75%	1,316	12.46%
Ward		69,919	55,673	79.63%	2,853	4.08%	1,570	2.25%	1,087	1.55%	129	0.18%	250	0.36%	3,767	5.39%	4,590	6.56%
Wells		3,982	3,784	95.03%	18	0.45%	17	0.43%	12	0.30%	0	0.00%	4	0.10%	109	2.74%	38	0.95%
Williams		40,950	30,761	75.12%	2,041	4.98%	1,125	2.75%	612	1.49%	98	0.24%	164	0.40%	2,252	5.50%	3,897	9.52%

== See also ==
- Geography of North Dakota
- North Dakota Association of Counties
