= List of nature centers in the United States =

The following is a list of nature centers and environmental education centers in the United States.

== District of Columbia ==
Name	Location	Summary
Rock Creek Park Nature Center and Planetarium	Washington, D.C.	1,754 acres, exhibits about the park's forest, plants and animals
National Environmental Museum and Education Center	Washington, D.C.	1,600 square feet of museum and educational space (closed)

== Hawaii ==
Name	Location	Island	Summary
Hawaiʻi Nature Center	Honolulu	Oʻahu	website, offers programs at the Makiki Valley State Recreation Area, Puʻu ʻUalakaʻa State Park, and other areas on Oahu, and also ʻĪao Valley and Kealia Pond National Wildlife Refuge on Maui
Hawaiian Islands Humpback Whale National Marine Sanctuary	Kihei	Maui	Education center features exhibits about the natural and cultural history of humpback whales and marine life found in the sanctuary

== Idaho ==
Name	Location	County	Summary
Boise WaterShed	Boise	Ada	website, located at the West Boise Wastewater Treatment Facility, hands-on exhibits about water quality and watersheds, partnership between the Boise Public Works Department and Boise WaterShed Exhibits, Inc.
Jim Hall Foothills Learning Center	Boise	Ada	website, operated by the City, education and information about the Boise foothills and the surrounding high-desert environment
MK Nature Center	Boise	Ada	website, 4 acres, also known as the Morrison Knudsen Nature Center, operated by the State
World Center for Birds of Prey	Boise	Ada	580 acres, headquarters for The Peregrine Fund, Velma Morrison Interpretive Center features live raptors, interactive displays, multi-media shows and live demonstrations

== Louisiana ==
Name	Location	Parish	Summary
Acadiana Park Nature Station	Lafayette	Lafayette	website, 110 acres, operated by the City
Audubon Louisiana Nature Center	New Orleans	Orleans	website, 86 acres, operated by the Audubon Nature Institute
Black Bayou Lake National Wildlife Refuge	Monroe	Ouachita	4,200 acres, with 40-acre Black Bayou Lake Environmental Education Center and adjacent arboretum
Bluebonnet Swamp Nature Center	Baton Rouge	East Baton Rouge	103 acres, operated by the City, features exhibits about area plants, animals, minerals and a vintage waterfowl decoy carving collection
Cameron Prairie National Wildlife Refuge	Lake Charles	Cameron	website, 9,621 acres, with a visitor center focusing on the refuge's wildlife and ecosystem
Jean Lafitte National Historical Park and Preserve	Marrero	Jefferson	website, a system of historic parks as well as the Barataria Preserve, which includes extensive wetlands, forests, and an education center
Northlake Nature Center	Mandeville	St. Tammany	website, 400 acres

== Montana ==
Name	Location	County	Region	Summary
Montana Natural History Center	Missoula	Missoula	Western	website
Summit Nature Center at Whitefish Mountain Resort	Whitefish	Flathead	Western	Operated in cooperative with the Flathead National Forest
Montana Audubon Center	Billings	Yellowstone	South Central	website
Yellowstone Wildlife Sanctuary	Red Lodge	Carbon	South Central	website, formerly the Beartooth Nature Center, includes rehabilitated wolves, mountain lions, black bears, bison, elk, bobcat, fox, coyote, eagles, hawks, owls
ZooMontana	Billings	Yellowstone	South Central	Includes Yellowstone Arboretum and ZooMontana Botanical Park. Natural habitats for animals found above the 45th parallel. Accredited arboretum with 200 species of trees and woody shrubs. Nine botanical gardens. https://www.zoomontana.org and https://www.yellowstonearboretum.org

== Nevada ==
Name	Location	County	Region	Summary
Animal Ark (Nevada)	Reno	Washoe	Northwest	website, 38 acres, wildlife sanctuary and nature education center, features native North American predators
Clark County Wetlands Park	Las Vegas	Clark	Southern	2,900 acres, operated by the County
Oxbow Nature Study Area	Reno	Washoe	Northwest	website, operated by the Nevada Department of Wildlife on the Truckee River
Red Rock Canyon National Conservation Area	Las Vegas	Clark	Southern	Encompasses 195,819 acres within the Mojave Desert, visitor center features exhibit rooms, guided hikes, nature programs
Verdi Community Library and Nature Center	Verdi	Washoe	Northwest	website, 8 acres, partnership between the Nevada Department of Wildlife, Washoe County Public Library System, Washoe County School District, and the Verdi Community

== New Mexico ==
Name	Location	County	Region	Summary
Los Alamos Nature Center	Los Alamos	Los Alamos	Northern	website, natural history of the Pajarito Plateau and northern New Mexico, includes the Pajarito Environmental Education Center
Randall Davey Audubon Center & Sanctuary	Santa Fe	Santa Fe	Central	website, 135 acres, operated by the National Audubon Society
Rio Grande Nature Center State Park	Albuquerque	Bernalillo	Central	38 acres
Riverside Nature Center	Farmington	San Juan	Northern	website, operated by the City
Southwest Environmental Center	Las Cruces	Doña Ana	Southern	website, grassroots conservation organization, features aquarium, information displays, library, education and nature programs

== North Dakota ==
Name	Location	County	Region	Summary
Chahinkapa Zoo	Wahpeton	Richland	Southeast	18 acres, includes the Rodger Ehnstrom Nature Center to enhance understanding and respect for wildlife
Lake Metigoshe State Park	Bottineau	Bottineau	North Central	1,551 acres, includes the Turtle Mountain Outdoor Learning Center which offers ecology, conservation, and outdoor recreation programs
White Horse Hill National Game Preserve		Benson	North Central	1,674 acres, visitor center exhibits, public workshops, guided nature hikes, bird-watching walks, summer youth programs and conservation programs
Theodore Roosevelt National Park		McKenzie	West	Covers 110 square miles of land in three sections: the North Unit, the South Unit, and the Elkhorn Ranch Unit, visitor centers feature natural history exhibits and programs in McKenzie and Billings County
Turtle River State Park	Arvilla	Grand Forks	East	784 acres, includes an Outdoor Learning Center

== West Virginia ==
Name	Location	County	Region	Summary
Blackwater Falls State Park	Davis	Tucker	Central	2,358 acres, center open seasonally
Cranberry Mountain Nature Center	Elkins	Randolph	Central	Part of the Monongahela National Forest, open seasonally, visitor center in the Cranberry Glades area
Hawks Nest State Park	Ansted	Fayette	Southern West Virginia	370 acres, features the River Nature Center, aerial tram, 9 hole golf course
Pipestem Resort State Park	Pipestem	Summers	Southern West Virginia	4,050 acres, nature center open year round, includes the 1900s-period Harris Homestead with house, barn and meathouse
Schrader Environmental Education Center	Wheeling	Ohio	Northern Panhandle	Operated by the Oglebay Institute
Twin Falls Resort State Park	Pineville	Wyoming	Southern West Virginia	3,776 acres, nature center open year round

== Wyoming ==
Name	Location	County	Summary
National Bighorn Sheep Interpretive Center	Dubois	Fremont	Museum with focus about the biology and habitat of the Rocky Mountain Bighorn Sheep, wildlife viewing tours

== See also ==
- List of botanical gardens and arboretums in the United States
- List of science museums in the United States
- List of natural history museums
- List of nature centers in Canada
- Nature center for nature centers in other countries
- List of zoos in the United States
- List of aquaria in the United States
- State wildlife trails (United States)

== Resources ==
- Association of Nature Center Administrators
- North American Association for Environmental Education
- Environmental Education Week Nature Center Map - National Environmental Education Foundation
