= List of islands of North Dakota =

Islands of the state of North Dakota
- Location of North Dakota within the United States.

Geography
- Location: North Dakota
- Major islands: Grahams Island, Mallard Island

Administration
- United States
- State: North Dakota

The following is the list of islands of North Dakota. North Dakota is a landlocked state in the Upper Midwest. Land takes up 68,994 sq mi (178,690 km^{2}), whereas water accounts for 1,697.52 sq mi (4,396.6 km^{2}). With only 2.4% of the state being water, there are few lakes for islands to be found. Grassland and farm fields cover most of North Dakota, where the average elevation is 1,900 feet (580 m) above sea level. North Dakota has few named islands due to the lack of water bodies. Most islands are found in large reservoirs or in the Missouri River. Following the damming of the Missouri River, some islands were flooded and ceased to exist. They are still listed, but as historical only. There are other islands in North Dakota, however many are unnamed.

== Current Islands ==
List of named islands of North Dakota. Most islands are found in reservoirs including Lake Metigoshe and Lake Sakakawea, which was formed by damming the Missouri River.

Island	Body of Water	County	Area (sq mi)	Coordinates
Bear Island	Lake Metigoshe	Bottineau	0.03	48.9939002°N 100.3623638°W
Grahams Island	Devils Lake	Benson, Ramsey	6.02	48.0538881°N 99.0967958°W
Mackay Island	Lake Metigoshe	Bottineau	0.01	48.9758434°N 100.3473624°W
Mallard Island	Lake Sakakawea	McLean	4.75	47.5666658°N 101.3123802°W
Masonic Island	Lake Metigoshe	Bottineau	0.01	48.9852881°N 100.3443068°W
The Island	Lake Ibsen	Benson	0.09	48.2572212°N 99.4012459°W
Winona Island	Lake Oahe	Emmons	0.65	46.1097180°N 100.6004041°W

== Former Islands ==
List of former islands of North Dakota. These islands are historical and do not exist anymore. They were located in the Missouri River before the water level was raised by the construction of the Oahe Dam and the Garrison Dam by the United States Army Corps of Engineers.

Island	Body of Water	County	Coordinates
Bear Island	Missouri River	Williams	48.1444668°N 103.0351847°W
Goldfinch Towhead	Missouri River	McLean	47.6805633°N 102.2573964°W
Gros Ventres Island	Missouri River	McLean	47.5738875°N 101.0670941°W
Knifer Towhead	Missouri River	McKenzie	47.9383495°N 102.6201850°W
Little Bason Island	Missouri River	McLean	47.5038913°N 101.8290600°W
Little Bear Island	Missouri River	McKenzie	48.1355778°N 102.9662955°W
Sibley Island	Missouri River	Morton	46.7280499°N 100.7851273°W
Strawberry Island	Missouri River	Williams	48.1311322°N 102.8971289°W
Sunday Island	Missouri River	Mountrail	47.7964013°N 102.5912990°W

== See also ==
- List of islands of the Midwestern United States
- Geography of North Dakota
