= Little Metigoshe State Recreation Area =

State recreation area in North Dakota

- Location within North Dakota
- Location: Bottineau County, North Dakota, United States
- Nearest city: Bottineau, North Dakota
- Coordinates: 48°58′41″N 100°20′22″W
- Elevation: 2,139 ft (652 m)
- Administrator: North Dakota Parks and Recreation Department
- Designation: North Dakota state park
- Website: Little Metigoshe State Recreation Area

Little Metigoshe State Recreation Area is a smaller unit of the North Dakota state park system located on the east shore of Lake Metigoshe in the Turtle Mountains near the international border between Canada and the United States. The area offers picnicking, fishing dock, and wintertime access to ice fishing. It lies one half mile west of the entrance to Lake Metigoshe State Park, a 1,500-acre facility that offers a full menu of recreational activities.
