= List of North Dakota state parks =

Map of North Dakota state parks: green=state park; red=recreation area; black=historic site.

North Dakota state parks are state parks managed by the North Dakota Parks and Recreation Department.

== State parks and recreation areas ==
Name	County	Area	Estab- lished	Lake / river	Image	Remarks
Beaver Lake State Park	Logan	273.16 acres (110.54 ha)	1932	Beaver Lake		Boating, fishing, camping
Butte Saint Paul State Recreation Area	Bottineau	51.23 acres (20.73 ha)	1933			Turtle Mountains vista point
Cross Ranch State Park	Oliver	569.07 acres (230.29 ha)	1989	Missouri River		Boating, canoeing, camping
Crow Flies High State Recreation Area	Mountrail	247.11 acres (100.00 ha)		Lake Sakakawea		Scenic lake views
Fort Abraham Lincoln State Park	Morton	836.47 acres (338.51 ha)	1907	Heart River, Missouri River		Home to On-A-Slant Indian Village
Fort Ransom State Park	Ransom	933.78 acres (377.89 ha)	1976	Sheyenne River		Preserved homesteader farms
Fort Stevenson State Park	McLean	586.48 acres (237.34 ha)	1974	Lake Sakakawea		Includes Fort Stevenson State Park Arboretum
Grahams Island State Park	Ramsey	959.33 acres (388.23 ha)	1988	Devils Lake		Last remaining unit of the four former Devils Lake State Parks
Icelandic State Park	Pembina	930.3 acres (376.5 ha)	1964	Lake Renwick		Includes the Gunlogson Arboretum Nature Preserve
Lake Metigoshe State Park	Bottineau	1,508.53 acres (610.48 ha)	1937	Lake Metigoshe		Adjacent to Turtle Mountain Provincial Park, Manitoba
Lake Sakakawea State Park	Mercer	739.52 acres (299.27 ha)	1965	Lake Sakakawea		Adjacent to Garrison Dam
Lewis and Clark State Park	Williams	524.81 acres (212.38 ha)	1973	Lake Sakakawea		Fishing, boating, camping
Little Metigoshe State Recreation Area	Bottineau		1937	Lake Metigoshe		Picnicking, fishing
Little Missouri State Park	Dunn	6,492.93 acres (2,627.60 ha)	1971	Little Missouri River		Badlands hiking and equestrian trails
Pelican Point State Recreation Area	Bottineau	25.22 acres (10.21 ha)		Lake Metigoshe		Undeveloped day-use area
Pembina Gorge State Recreation Area	Cavalier	1,236.98 acres (500.59 ha)	2012	Pembina River		River kayaking; trails for hiking, horseback riding, and off-road vehicles
Rough Rider State Park	Billings	63.03 acres (25.51 ha)	1970	Little Missouri River		Start of the Maah Daah Hey Trail
Turtle Mountain State Recreation Area	Bottineau	695.04 acres (281.27 ha)				Off-highway vehicle, hiking, biking, snowshoeing and horseback riding trails.
Turtle River State Park	Grand Forks	775.28 acres (313.74 ha)	1934	Turtle River		Camping, fishing, trails
