= Pelican Point State Recreation Area =

Park in North Dakota, United States

- Location within North Dakota
- Location: Bottineau County, North Dakota, United States
- Nearest city: Bottineau, North Dakota
- Coordinates: 48°57′31″N 100°20′50″W
- Area: 25.22 acres (10.21 ha)
- Elevation: 2,139 ft (652 m)
- Administrator: North Dakota Parks and Recreation Department
- Designation: North Dakota state park
- Website: Pelican Point State Recreation Area

Pelican Point State Recreation Area is an undeveloped unit of the North Dakota state park system located on Lake Metigoshe, ten miles (16 km) northeast of Bottineau. The recreation area's 25 acres (10 ha) are only accessible on foot; there are no developed trails.
