= Garrison Creek =

Garrison Creek may refer to:

- Garrison Creek (Ontario) in Toronto, Canada
- Garrison Creek (Missouri)
- Garrison Creek (North Dakota)
