= List of botanical gardens and arboretums in North Dakota =

This list of botanical gardens and arboretums in North Dakota is intended to include all significant botanical gardens and arboretums in the U.S. state of North Dakota

Name	Image	Affiliation	City
Berthold Public School Arboretum			Berthold
Denbigh Experimental Forest			Towner
Fort Stevenson State Park Arboretum			Garrison
Gunlogson Arboretum Nature Preserve			Cavalier
International Peace Garden			Rolette County
Myra Arboretum			Larimore
Northern Plains Botanic Garden Society			Fargo

== See also ==
- List of botanical gardens and arboretums in the United States
