= Turtle Mountain State Recreation Area =

Park in North Dakota, USA

- Location within North Dakota
- Location: Bottineau County, North Dakota, United States
- Nearest city: Bottineau, North Dakota
- Coordinates: 48°54′02″N 100°27′28″W
- Area: 695.04 acres (281.27 ha)
- Elevation: 2,200 ft (670 m)
- Administrator: North Dakota Parks and Recreation Department
- Designation: North Dakota state park
- Website: Turtle Mountain State Recreation Area

Turtle Mountain State Recreation Area is a unit of the North Dakota state park system located six miles (9.7 km) northwest of Bottineau. The recreation area offers 12 miles (19 km) of trails for off-highway vehicles, hiking, biking, snowshoeing and horseback riding.
