= Turtle River =

Turtle River may refer to:

== Rivers ==
=== Canada ===
- Turtle River (Manitoba), a tributary of Dauphin Lake
- Turtle River, near Ignace, Ontario
- Rivière à la Tortue or Turtle River, Quebec

=== United States ===
- Turtle River (Georgia)
- Turtle River (Bowstring River tributary), Minnesota
- Turtle River (Mississippi River tributary), Minnesota
- Turtle River (North Dakota)
  - Turtle River State Park
- Turtle River (Wisconsin)

== Settlements ==
- Rural Municipality of Turtle River No. 469, Saskatchewan, Canada
- Turtle River, Minnesota, US
- Turtle River Township, Beltrami County, Minnesota, US
