= Lewis and Clark State Park (North Dakota) =

State park in North Dakota, U.S.

- Location within North Dakota
- Location: Williams County, North Dakota, United States
- Nearest city: Williston, North Dakota
- Coordinates: 48°07′33″N 103°13′44″W
- Area: 524.81 acres (212.38 ha)
- Elevation: 1,844 ft (562 m)
- Established: 1973
- Administrator: North Dakota Parks and Recreation Department
- Designation: North Dakota state park
- Website: Official website

Lewis and Clark State Park is a public recreation area occupying 525 acres (212 ha) in Williams County, North Dakota, where Gamache Creek enters Lake Sakakawea, 18 miles (29 km) east of Williston. The state park offers fishing, boating, camping, and picnicking.

== History ==
The park is named for Meriwether Lewis and William Clark, the leaders of the Corps of Discovery, which camped near here on April 17, 1805. The North Dakota state parks department added three park units on Lake Sakakawea after the state legislature authorized the leasing of land from the U.S. Army Corps of Engineers in 1971. Lake Sakakawea and Lewis and Clark state parks were established in 1973; Fort Stevenson State Park near Garrison was established in 1974.

== Activities and amenities ==
The park features a marina with slips for rental, a swimming beach, campground. cabins, and nine miles (14 km) of trails for hiking and mountain biking.
