= Little Missouri State Park =

Park in North Dakota, USA

- Location within North Dakota
- Location: Dunn County, North Dakota, United States
- Nearest city: Killdeer, North Dakota
- Coordinates: 47°33′9″N 102°44′46″W
- Area: 6,492.93 acres (2,627.60 ha)
- Established: 1971
- Administrator: North Dakota Parks and Recreation Department
- Designation: North Dakota state park
- Website: Official website

Little Missouri State Park is a public recreation area of over 6,000 acres (2,400 ha) located on the western side of the Little Missouri River, near the river's confluence with Lake Sakakawea, ten miles (16 km) north of Killdeer, North Dakota. Much of the state park consists of badlands terrain that is only accessible by trail. The park has more than 45 miles (72 km) of trails as well as campgrounds for hiking and equestrian use. The majority of the park's area is managed under lease from federal and private owners.

Visitors' experiences of the park have been impacted by major oil drilling operations in the Killdeer area that began in 2011 and that include land within the park. In 2015, the oil company ConocoPhillips agreed to move trails at its own expense to skirt hikers and riders around well sites. In 2016, Governor Jack Dalrymple asked that drillers make a concerted effort "to preserve the view-scape as much as possible."
