= Grahams Island State Park =

Park in North Dakota, USA

- Location within North Dakota
- Location: Ramsey County, North Dakota, United States
- Nearest city: Devils Lake, North Dakota
- Coordinates: 48°02′37″N 99°03′22″W
- Area: 959.33 acres (388.23 ha)
- Elevation: 1,496 ft (456 m)
- Established: 1988
- Administrator: North Dakota Parks and Recreation Department
- Designation: North Dakota state park
- Website: Grahams Island State Park

Grahams Island State Park is a public recreation area in North Dakota occupying 959 acres (388 ha) on the eastern flank of Grahams Island in Devils Lake. At one time there were four recreational units on the lake, collectively known as Devils Lake State Parks, but rising water caused three units to be closed, leaving only Grahams Island State Park in operation. The park offers fishing, boating, picnicking, campsites, and cabins.

== History ==
The Narrows Recreation Area at Devils Lake was added to the North Dakota park system in 1981. Grahams Island State Park, Shelvers Grove State Recreation Area, and Black Tiger Bay State Recreation Area were established in 1988. Rising lake waters caused the closure of Narrows State Recreation Area in 1995 and the closure of Shelvers Grove in 2004. By 2014, Black Tiger Bay Recreation Area, with its boat ramp and large parking area, had also been closed due to inaccessibility.
