= Rough Rider State Park =

Park in North Dakota, USA

- Location within North Dakota Location within the United States
- Location: Billings County, North Dakota, United States
- Nearest city: Medora, North Dakota
- Coordinates: 46°53′45″N 103°32′23″W
- Area: 63.03 acres (25.51 ha)
- Elevation: 2,261 ft (689 m)
- Established: 1970
- Administrator: North Dakota Parks and Recreation Department
- Designation: North Dakota state park
- Website: Official website

Rough Rider State Park is a public recreation area located along the eastern banks of the Little Missouri River about two miles (3.2 km) south of Medora in Billings County, North Dakota. The state park is used for camping, horse camping, and canoeing. The Rough Riders was a nickname given to the 1st United States Volunteer Cavalry when it was led by Theodore Roosevelt. His presidential library is under construction nearby as Roosevelt hunted and ranched in the area in the 1880s. Formerly named after nearby Sully Creek, the name change in 2024 included consideration of General Alfred Sully who led military campaigns against the Sioux.

== Activities and facilities ==
The park is the starting point for the Maah Daah Hey Trail which winds northwards to Theodore Roosevelt National Park and is used by horseback riders, mountain bikers, and hikers. The park offers camping, equestrian facilities, and canoe access to the Little Missouri River. It is open seasonally.
