= Indian Hills Resort =

Indian Hills Resort, formerly called Indian Hills State Recreation Area and Resort, is a commercially operated resort on the north shore of Lake Sakakawea located 31 miles (50 km) west of Garrison, North Dakota. The resort offers camping, lodging, boating, fishing, and trails for hiking and biking.
