= Grahams Island =

Island in Benson County and Ramsey County, North Dakota, USA

- Location within North Dakota Location within the United States

Geography
- Location: Devils Lake
- Coordinates: 48°03′14″N 99°05′48″W
- Highest elevation: 1,496 ft (456 m)

Administration
- United States
- State: North Dakota
- Counties: Benson, Ramsey

Grahams Island is an island in Devils Lake, a lake just outside the city of Devils Lake, North Dakota, which covers approximately 9 sq mi (23 km^{2}).

People live on the island year-round, although the population increases during the warmer months. The North and Central parts of the island are farms, with dense forest in the South and Southwest.

Grahams Island State Park (part of Devils Lake State Park) is in the Southeast. The park, covering 1,122 acres (4.54 km^{2}), is a recreation area for boating, fishing, and camping.

Most of the island lies in the unorganized territory of Lallie North, in Benson County, while its easternmost portion lies in Poplar Grove Township, in Ramsey County.

== See also ==
- List of North Dakota state parks
