= Beaver Lake State Park (North Dakota) =

Park in North Dakota, USA

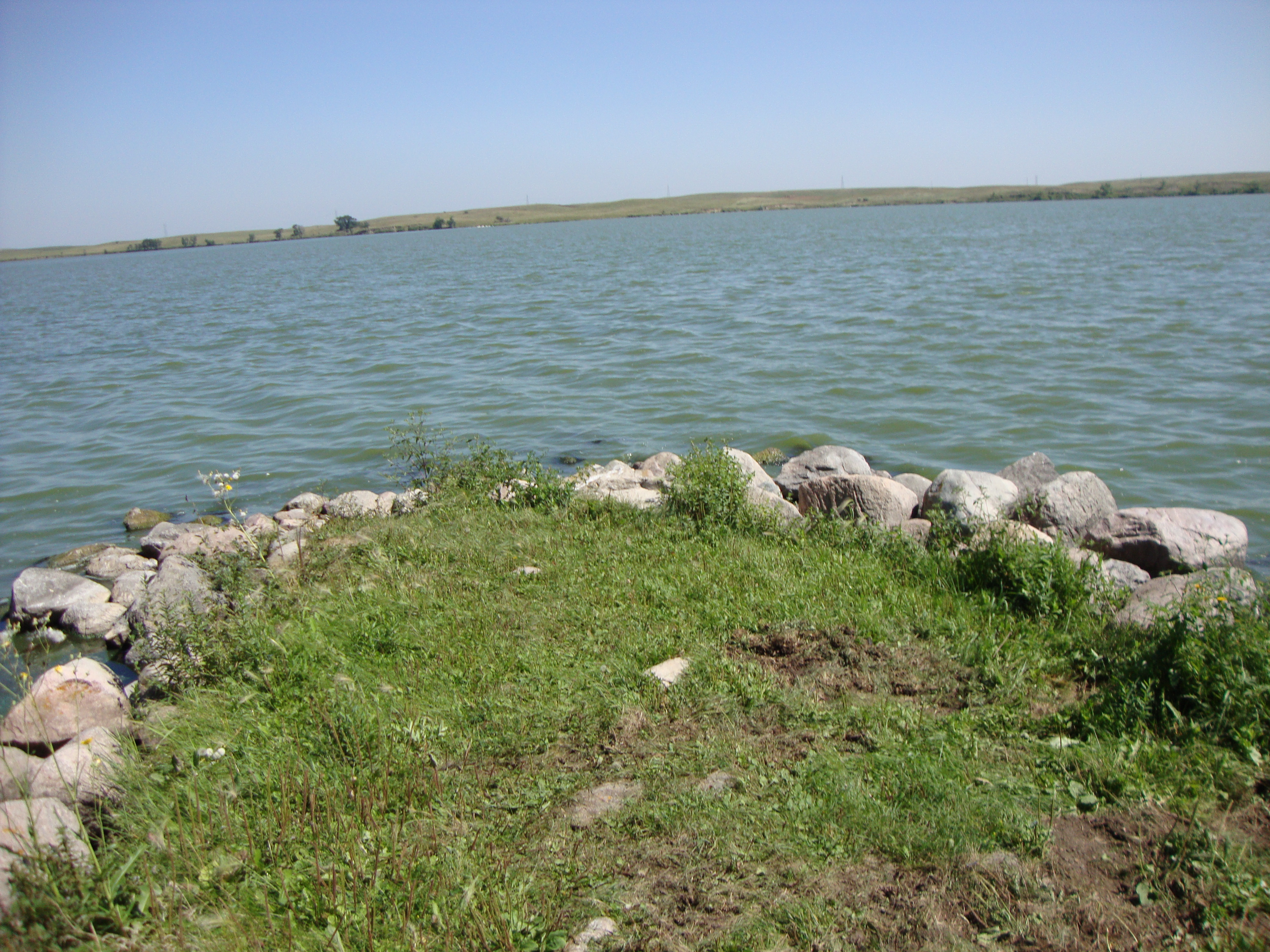

- Location within North Dakota
- Interactive map of Beaver Lake State Park
- Location: Logan County, North Dakota, United States
- Nearest city: Wishek, North Dakota
- Coordinates: 46°24′10″N 99°37′11″W
- Area: 273.16 acres (110.54 ha)
- Elevation: 1,962 ft (598 m)
- Established: 1932
- Administrator: North Dakota Parks and Recreation Department
- Visitors: average 18,497 (in 2009-2011)
- Designation: North Dakota state park
- Website: Official website

Beaver Lake State Park is a public recreation area located in Logan County, North Dakota, about equidistant from Napoleon and Wishek. The state park occupies 273 acres (110 ha) of land on the western shore of 968-acre (392 ha) Beaver Lake and offers hiking, boating, swimming, fishing, cabins, and campground.

== History ==
The park began through the encouragement of local residents who met in 1929 at Shepard’s Pavilion, which is located just south of the eventual park boundary, to promote creation of a state park honoring the early settlers who lived on the shores of Beaver Lake. Dedication ceremonies took place in July 1932. In 1933, the lake's water level was raised with the damming of Beaver Creek. Laborers with the Works Progress Administration worked in the park in 1935 and 1936, creating roads, paths, an earthen dock, and picnic area. Their work is memorialized with a stone monument in the park.
