= Pembina Gorge State Park =

Park in North Dakota, USA

- Location within North Dakota
- Location: Cavalier County, North Dakota, United States
- Nearest city: Walhalla, North Dakota
- Coordinates: 48°56′31″N 98°03′50″W
- Area: 1,236.98 acres (500.59 ha)
- Elevation: 1,381 feet (421 m)
- Established: 2012 (as State Recreation Area); 2026 (as State Park)
- Administrator: North Dakota Parks and Recreation Department
- Designation: North Dakota state park
- Website: Pembina Gorge State Park

Pembina Gorge State Park is a unit of the North Dakota state park system located along the Pembina River, six miles (10 km) west of Walhalla. The area offers river kayaking and multi-use trails for hiking, horseback riding, mountain biking, and off-road vehicles.

== History ==
The recreation area had its original grand opening on June 30, 2012. In May 2023, funding was approved for the area to become North Dakota's 14th state park, with ground broken on May 31, 2024. The park opened to the public in June 2026, though the opening ceremony was postponed due to weather.

== Ecology ==
The Pembina Gorge is home to the highest numbers and concentrations of rare species known in North Dakota. These include 21 animal species and 30 plant species of which eight occur nowhere else in the state. Over 480 species of vascular plants, representing a third of North Dakota flora, may be found. A count of 209 floristic species, which included prior efforts, were collected in 2014.

== See also ==
- Pembina Valley Provincial Park, Manitoba
