= Butte Saint Paul State Recreation Area =

Park in North Dakota, USA

- Location within North Dakota
- Interactive map of Butte Saint Paul; State Recreation Area
- Location: Bottineau County, North Dakota, United States
- Nearest city: Dunseith, North Dakota
- Coordinates: 48°51′06″N 100°11′45″W
- Area: 51.23 acres (20.73 ha)
- Elevation: 2,280 ft (690 m)
- Established: June 28, 1933
- Administrator: North Dakota Parks and Recreation Department
- Designation: North Dakota state park
- Website: Official website

Butte Saint Paul State Recreation Area is a public recreation area located seven miles (11 km) northwest of Dunseith in Bottineau County, North Dakota. The state park unit encompasses the 580-foot (180 m) Butte Saint Paul. At its peak a 12-foot (3.7 m) stone cairn and commemorative plaque stand as tribute. A circular trail leads to the top of the peak, allowing hikers to take expansive views of the surrounding Turtle Mountain region.

== History ==
In January 1850, Jesuit missionary Georges-Antoine Belcourt and a small traveling party survived a blizzard by digging into the snow atop the peak. Belcourt erected a wooden cross on the summit and christened the peak Butte Saint Paul, as that day was the Feast of the Conversion of Saint Paul the Apostle. The remains of the cross were rediscovered in the 1930s and were commemorated with a stone cairn and the declaration of a 10-acre (4.0 ha) state park.
