= WGO =

WGO may refer to:

- KWGO, known as WGO, radio station in Burlington, North Dakota, US
- World Gastroenterology Organisation
- Winnebago Industries, NYSE symbol
- Winchester Regional Airport, Virginia, US, IATA code
