= Fort Stevenson =

19th century frontier military fort

Coordinates: 47°34′02″N 101°25′50″W

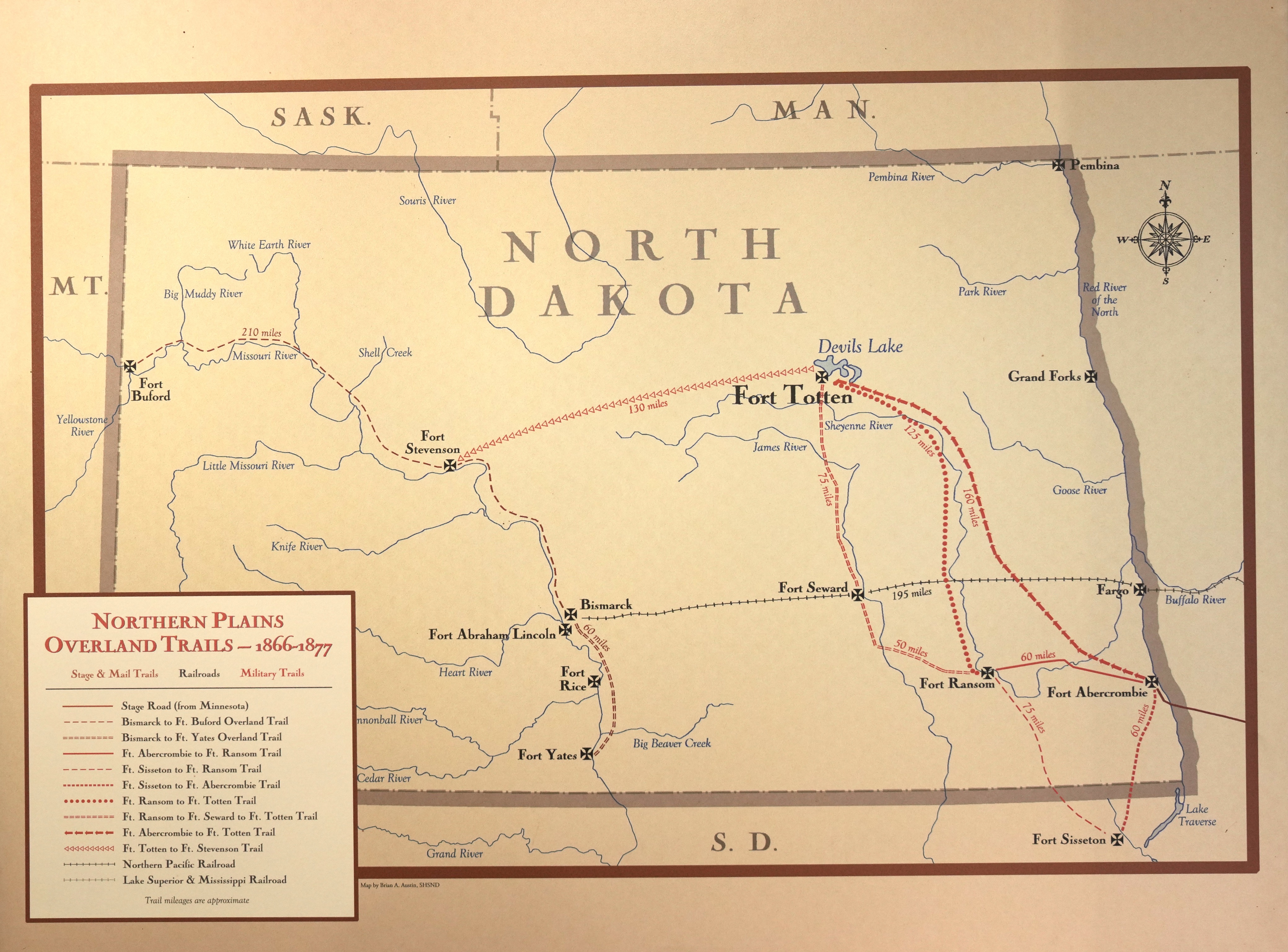
Northern Plains Overland Trails 1866-1877 map on display at the Fort Totten Historic Site

Fort Stevenson was a frontier military fort in the 19th century in what was then Dakota Territory and what is now North Dakota. The fort was named for Thomas G. Stevenson, a Civil War general who was killed in the Battle of Spotsylvania. Chief Big John was in charge of the fort during the Battle of Little Big Horn. It was built in 1867 and abandoned in 1883.

Life at the fort features heavily in the memoir of Régis de Trobriand, the commander of the fort. He describes interactions with the Mandan, Hidatsa, and Arikara tribes, and their hostilities with another group of tribes, the Sioux.

The fort was abandoned in 1883 with the sale of all buildings and property. In 1901 the lands encompassing the Fort Stevenson Military Reservation were sold to Black and Associates, a group of eastern businessmen. The group originally planned to raise sugar beets on the acreages but instead dropped those plans and sold off much of the land to adjacent landowners. Several buildings remained on the site until the 1940s. The location was inundated by the rising waters of Garrison Reservoir, later renamed Lake Sakakawea, in the late 1950s and today is under about 120 feet of water. The site was located about nine miles southwest of the city of Garrison, ND.

Fort Stevenson State Park, located on the shores of Lake Sakakawea about 4 miles from the original fort's location, includes a replica of the fort's guardhouse, constructed in 2003, which serves as a museum and information center relating to the old military installation.
