= Lake Metigoshe State Park =

Park in North Dakota, USA

- Location within North Dakota
- Location: Roland Township, Bottineau County, North Dakota, United States
- Nearest city: Bottineau, North Dakota
- Coordinates: 48°59′12″N 100°19′26″W
- Area: 1,508.53 acres (610.48 ha)
- Elevation: 2,139 ft (652 m)
- Established: 1937
- Administrator: North Dakota Parks and Recreation Department
- Designation: North Dakota state park
- Website: Official website

Lake Metigoshe State Park is a public recreation area occupying some 1,500 acres (610 ha) on the shores of Lake Metigoshe in the Turtle Mountains, 14 miles northeast of Bottineau, North Dakota, on the Canada–US border. The state park lies adjacent to the southwest corner of the much larger Turtle Mountain Provincial Park in Manitoba. A small portion of the lake extends northward into the Municipality of Deloraine-Winchester but is not part of either park.

== History ==
The name Lake Metigoshe is derived from the Ojibwe phrase mitigoshi-waashegami-zaaga'igan meaning "clearwater lake of scrub-oaks." The area was also once home to the Blackfoot, Hidatsa, and Assiniboine peoples.

The park was developed by workers with the WPA who arrived at the site beginning in 1934. Their improvements included construction of a lodge, recreation rooms large enough for 200 people, roads, and various out buildings. A stone inscribed "WPA 1938" found near the park entrance commemorates their work. The park was formally established on February 17, 1937.

== Activities and amenities ==
The park offers swimming, canoeing, sailing, water-skiing and other water sports, modern and primitive camping areas, and picnicking. Lake Metigoshe has northern pike, walleye, and perch for fishing. Winter activities include snowmobiling, cross-country skiing, skating, sledding, and ice fishing. The Turtle Mountain Outdoor Learning Center offers ecology, conservation, and outdoor recreation programs.

=== Events ===
The Club de Skinautique water-skiers practice and perform on Lake Metigoshe. Known as the "Skinautiques," the club has performed water skiing shows every summer since 1958.

== Climate ==
Climate data for Lake Metigoshe State Park, North Dakota, 1991–2020 normals: 2142ft (653m)
Month	Jan	Feb	Mar	Apr	May	Jun	Jul	Aug	Sep	Oct	Nov	Dec	Year
Record high °F (°C)	51 (11)	51 (11)	69 (21)	80 (27)	90 (32)	91 (33)	97 (36)	98 (37)	92 (33)	84 (29)	64 (18)	50 (10)	98 (37)
Mean maximum °F (°C)	41.4 (5.2)	39.8 (4.3)	53.1 (11.7)	71.5 (21.9)	81.8 (27.7)	82.4 (28.0)	89.8 (32.1)	90.4 (32.4)	83.5 (28.6)	73.2 (22.9)	52.2 (11.2)	40.2 (4.6)	90.1 (32.3)
Mean daily maximum °F (°C)	15.9 (−8.9)	20.4 (−6.4)	32.1 (0.1)	49.8 (9.9)	62.7 (17.1)	71.8 (22.1)	76.5 (24.7)	76.1 (24.5)	66.8 (19.3)	50.1 (10.1)	32.1 (0.1)	19.9 (−6.7)	47.8 (8.8)
Daily mean °F (°C)	5.4 (−14.8)	8.8 (−12.9)	21.4 (−5.9)	38.2 (3.4)	51.1 (10.6)	60.9 (16.1)	65.8 (18.8)	64.2 (17.9)	54.9 (12.7)	39.9 (4.4)	23.6 (−4.7)	10.6 (−11.9)	37.1 (2.8)
Mean daily minimum °F (°C)	−5.2 (−20.7)	−2.8 (−19.3)	10.8 (−11.8)	26.5 (−3.1)	39.4 (4.1)	50.0 (10.0)	55.1 (12.8)	52.3 (11.3)	42.9 (6.1)	29.7 (−1.3)	15.1 (−9.4)	1.2 (−17.1)	26.3 (−3.2)
Mean minimum °F (°C)	−27.7 (−33.2)	−24.9 (−31.6)	−14.6 (−25.9)	9.2 (−12.7)	25.4 (−3.7)	40.4 (4.7)	47.7 (8.7)	43.7 (6.5)	32.6 (0.3)	16.3 (−8.7)	−4.8 (−20.4)	−19.7 (−28.7)	−29.5 (−34.2)
Record low °F (°C)	−46 (−43)	−35 (−37)	−40 (−40)	−10 (−23)	17 (−8)	33 (1)	41 (5)	37 (3)	25 (−4)	6 (−14)	−22 (−30)	−35 (−37)	−46 (−43)
Average precipitation inches (mm)	0.48 (12)	0.65 (17)	0.79 (20)	1.01 (26)	2.67 (68)	3.88 (99)	3.14 (80)	2.39 (61)	1.71 (43)	1.40 (36)	0.85 (22)	0.62 (16)	19.59 (500)
Average snowfall inches (cm)	9.8 (25)	8.1 (21)	7.7 (20)	3.3 (8.4)	1.9 (4.8)	0.0 (0.0)	0.0 (0.0)	0.0 (0.0)	0.0 (0.0)	2.8 (7.1)	8.7 (22)	8.7 (22)	51 (130.3)
Source 1: NOAA (1981-2010 snowfall)
Source 2: XMACIS (temp records & monthly max/mins)
