= Bottineau Winter Park =

Ski area in North Dakota, United States

- Location in the United States Location in North Dakota
- Location: Bottineau County, North Dakota, U.S.
- Nearest city: Bottineau: 10 mi (16 km); Minot: 91 mi (146 km); Brandon, MB: 95 mi (153 km)
- Coordinates: 48.951°N 100.473°W
- Vertical: 180 ft (55 m)
- Top elevation: 2,450 ft (747 m) AMSL
- Base elevation: 2,270 ft (692 m)
- Skiable area: 40 acres (0.16 km^{2})
- Trails: 9: 2 - easiest; 3 - more difficult; 4 - most difficult
- Lift system: 1 triple chairlift 4 surface lifts
- Terrain parks: 1
- Snowmaking: 100%
- Night skiing: 100%, Thu-Fri to 9 pm
- Website: skibwp.com

Bottineau Winter Park is a small alpine ski area in the midwestern United States, nestled in the Turtle Mountains of north-central North Dakota. Located 10 miles (16 km) north of Bottineau in Bottineau County and three miles (5 km) south of the international border with Canada (Manitoba), BWP covers 40 acres (0.16 km^{2}) and was started in 1969 by local businessmen.

The ski area operates three days a week:

- Friday: 12 pm – 9 pm
- Saturday: 10 am – 5 pm
- Sunday: 10 am – 5 pm

== Annie's House ==
A new year-round lodge and visitor center opened in the summer of 2013. This chalet commemorates Stanley native Ann Nicole Nelson (1971–2001), who worked for Cantor Fitzgerald on the 104th floor of the North Tower of the World Trade Center and was killed in the September 11 attacks.

Annie's House is a one-level, 12,000-square-foot (1,110 m^{2}) ski lodge designed to accommodate the needs of skiers with both physical and cognitive disabilities from across North Dakota and neighboring Manitoba. Approximately 50% of the public space in the facility is dedicated to an adaptive ski program designed to support the needs of disabled skiers and their families. It is the first facility in North Dakota focused on empowering disabled skiers and their families to enjoy outdoor sports during winter while also providing a year-round facility to accommodate other adaptive sports. It replaces the original lodge of 1969.

Annie's House provides an integrated, adaptive ski facility and program to accommodate the special needs of disabled children and young adults with cognitive disabilities such as autism, intellectual disability, and Down syndrome, and physical disabilities such as blindness, cerebral palsy, and spinal cord injuries. In addition, Annie's House is designed to provide adaptive ski equipment and programs for wounded veterans who returned from Iraq and Afghanistan challenged with physical disabilities resulting from amputation and traumatic brain injury.

== Attractions ==
- 8 trails
- 7 lifts – (1 triple chair, 4 surface, 2 Magic Carpet)
- night skiing – 100%
- snowmaking – 100%
- snow tube park
- rentals
