= Neal Calvin Peterson =

- Origin: Bottineau, North Dakota, U.S.
- Formerly of: Infinite Religions, Curious Yello

Neal Calvin Peterson is a musician and artist.

== Biography ==
Peterson was raised in Minot, North Dakota. From 1999 to 2003, he played bass guitar in Curious Yello before performing and releasing music independently. Peterson is based in Minneapolis, Minnesota.

== Discography ==
=== Infinite Religions ===
- 2015: Harmony
- 2014: Mirrors
- 2014: Duality

=== Neal Peterson ===
- 2011: The Persistence of Tiddddddes
- 2009: Chaos Theory, Explained (EP)
- 2007: Riot in Luxury
- 2003: Songs for the Whiskey Convention (Demos)

=== Curious Yello ===
- 2009: XYZ: Rarities
- 2001: Wish
