= Pembina Valley Provincial Park =

Provincial park in Manitoba, Canada

- IUCN category III (natural monument or feature)
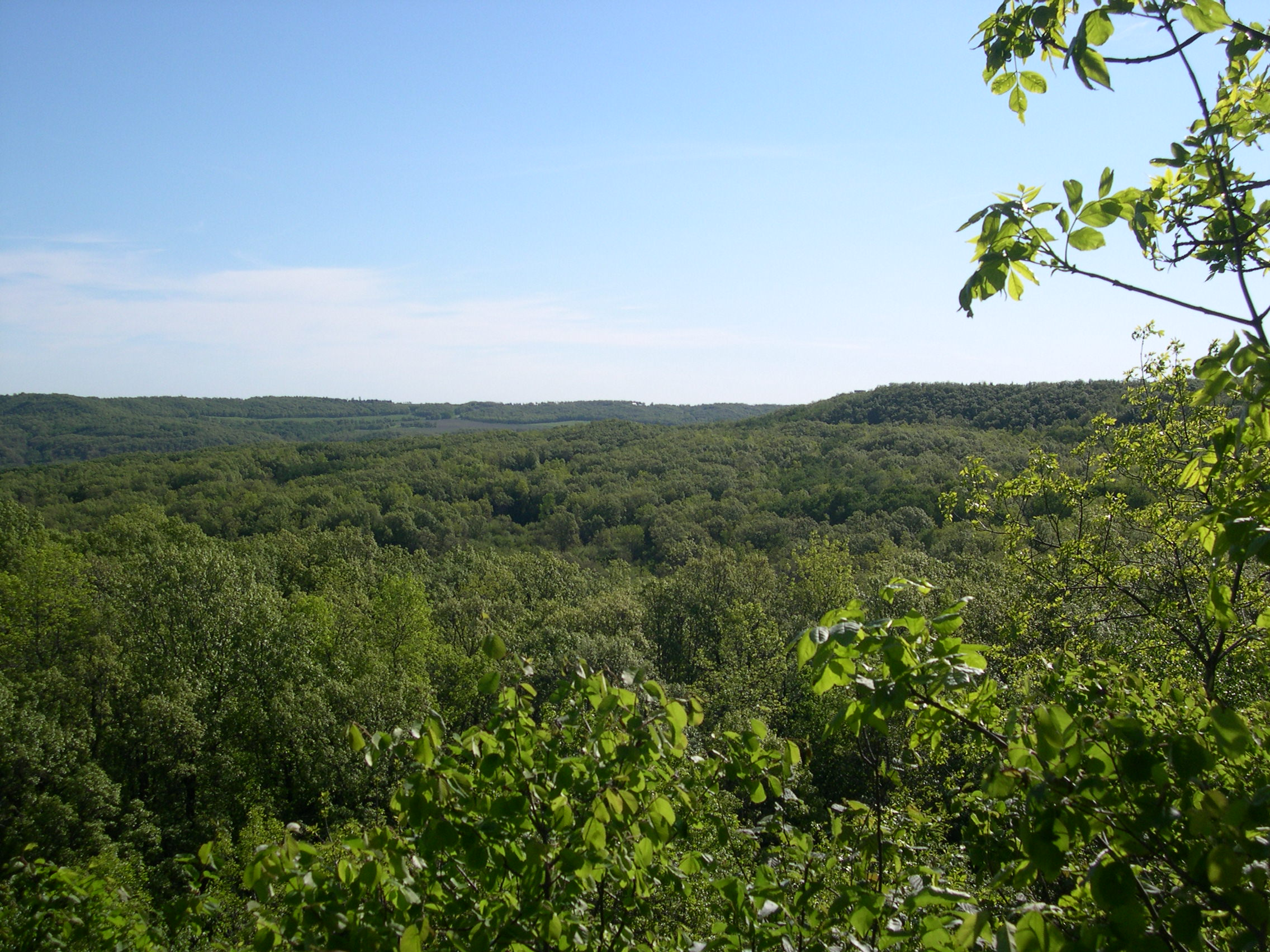

- Location within Manitoba
- Interactive map of Pembina Valley Provincial Park
- Location: Manitoba, Canada
- Nearest town: Morden, Manitoba
- Coordinates: 49°0′48″N 98°16′14″W
- Area: 1.8 km^{2} (0.69 sq mi)
- Established: 2001
- Governing body: Government of Manitoba

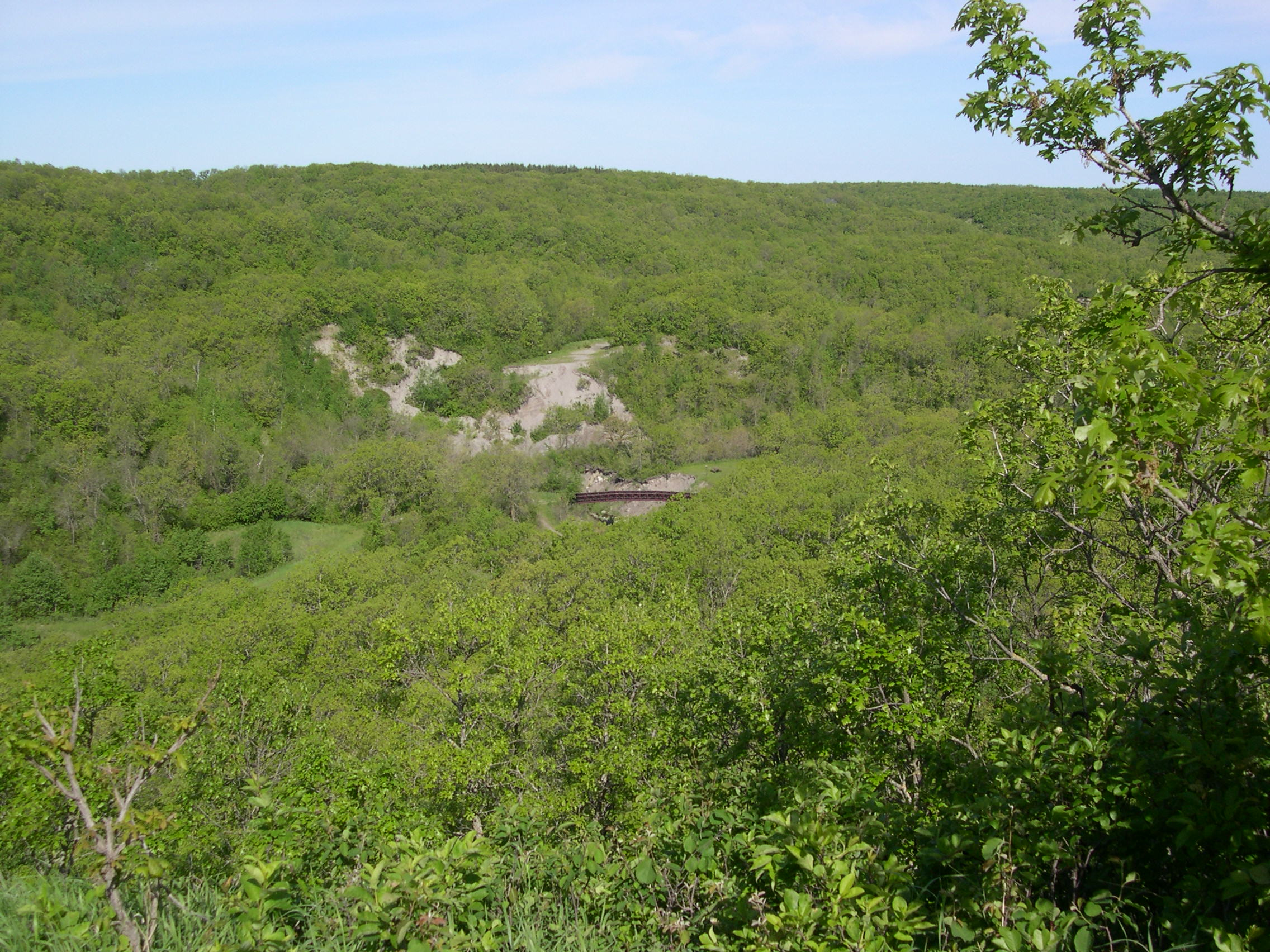
Pembina Valley lookout point.

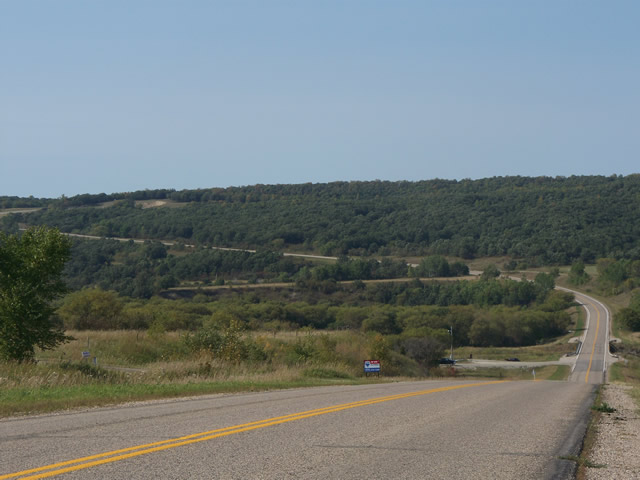
Highway 31 crossing the Pembina Valley.

Pembina Valley Provincial Park is a provincial park in southern Manitoba, Canada. It is located 47 kilometres south-west of Morden, Manitoba, Canada on Highway 3, Highway 31, and Highway 201, and covers approximately 1.8 square kilometres (440 acres). The park is considered to be a Class III protected area under the IUCN protected area management categories.

The park was officially opened on October 5, 2001 by Premier Gary Doer and James Richardson, representing the Nature Conservancy of Canada. Pembina Valley Provincial Park is Manitoba's 75th provincial park. The park contains approximately 12.7 km of hiking trails. In 2009, a 24 m (80 ft) single-span steel bridge and 9 m (30 ft) observation tower were added to the park.

A Rocha Canada operates a Field Study Centre on 100 acres immediately adjacent to the park, and assists parks staff in conducting interpretive walks. A Rocha offers environmental, place-based learning programs for children, youth, and educators. They also operated a B&B, which earned the Pembina Valley Tourism's 2010 Award of Distinction, For travelers heading to the park who want to stay close by.

The park is located at the extreme southwest corner of the Rural Municipality of Stanley, and the extreme southeast corner of the Rural Municipality of Pembina.

== See also ==
- List of protected areas of Manitoba
- Pembina Gorge State Park, North Dakota
