= KBTO =

- Bottineau, North Dakota; United States
- Broadcast area: Minot, North Dakota
- Frequency: 101.9 MHz
- Branding: "Sunny 101.9"

Programming
- Format: Country
- Affiliations: ABC News Radio

Ownership
- Owner: Programmer's Broadcasting; (Programmer's Broadcasting, Inc.)
- Sister stations: KTZU, KWGO

History
- First air date: November 9, 1980
- Call sign meaning: K BOTtineau last two letters are transposed

Technical information
- Licensing authority: FCC
- Facility ID: 16903
- Class: C1
- Power: 94,000 watts
- HAAT: 149 meters (489 ft)
- Transmitter coordinates: 48°51′6″N 100°20′4″W

Links
- Public license information: Public file; LMS
- Webcast: Listen Live
- Website: sunny1019fm.com

KBTO (101.9 FM) is a country formatted broadcast radio station licensed to Bottineau, North Dakota, serving North-Central North Dakota. KBTO is owned and operated by Programmer's Broadcasting.

== History ==
KBTO first signed on the air on November 9, 1980. The station's call sign is considered to reflect its city of license, standing for "K BOtTineau" (with the last two letters transposed).

The station was acquired by John and Jean Kircher of Minot, operating as Programmer's Broadcasting, in a deal finalized in 2001. They purchased the assets of KBTO-FM from Ivers Broadcasting, Inc. for $595,000. KBTO's sister stations in the Minot market include KTZU and KWGO.

== Public service ==
Notable public service efforts have included "Are You Tough Enough to Wear Pink?", a 2007 campaign rallying the rodeo and western industry to raise money and awareness for breast cancer treatment and research. The campaign ultimately raised over $26,000 for a new cancer exercise rehabilitation center at the Minot Family YMCA.
