= Fort Stevenson State Park =

Park in North Dakota, USA

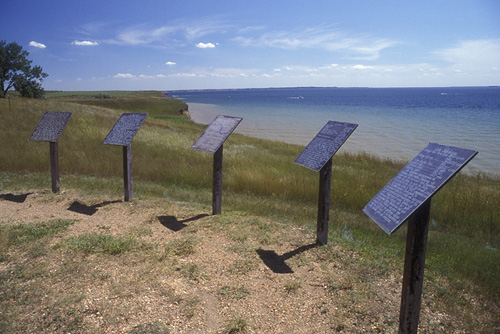
- Interpretive signs on Lake Sakakawea at Fort Stevenson State Park

- Location within North Dakota
- Location: McLean County, North Dakota, United States
- Nearest city: Garrison, North Dakota
- Coordinates: 47°35′27″N 101°25′12″W
- Area: 586.48 acres (237.34 ha)
- Elevation: 1,883 ft (574 m)
- Established: 1974
- Administrator: North Dakota Parks and Recreation Department
- Designation: North Dakota state park
- Website: Official website

Fort Stevenson State Park is a public recreation area located on a peninsula on Lake Sakakawea four miles (6.4 km) south of the community of Garrison in McLean County, North Dakota. The state park's 586 acres (237 ha) include a partial reconstruction of Fort Stevenson, the 19th-century Missouri River fort from which the park takes its name. The site of the original fort lies about two miles southwest, below the waters of Lake Sakakawea.

== Activities and amenities ==
The park offers fishing, boating, camping, and picnicking. It has more than eight miles of non-motorized trails for hiking, biking, and cross-country skiing. A half-mile trail winds through the park arboretum. Boaters can rent slips at two marinas. For overnight stays, the park offers cabins and campground.
