= KTZU =

Coordinates: 48.051°N 101.340°W

- Velva, North Dakota; United States
- Broadcast area: Minot, North Dakota
- Frequency: 94.9 MHz
- Branding: 94.9 The Zoo

Programming
- Format: Classic rock
- Affiliations: United Stations Radio Networks; Westwood One

Ownership
- Owner: Programmer's Broadcasting
- Sister stations: KBTO, KWGO

History
- First air date: April 2005
- Call sign meaning: K The Zoo (oo=U)

Technical information
- Licensing authority: FCC
- Facility ID: 162322
- Class: C1
- ERP: 100,000 watts
- HAAT: 156 meters

Links
- Public license information: Public file; LMS
- Webcast: Listen Live
- Website: 949thezoo.com

KTZU (94.9 FM, "94.9 The Zoo") is radio station with a classic rock format. Licensed to Velva, North Dakota, it serves the Minot, North Dakota area. KTZU began transmission in April 2005, and broadcasts The Bob and Tom Show during the mornings. Its studios are located at 624 31st Ave. SW in Minot, and the transmitter site is south of town off of Highway 83.

KTZU first signed on the air in 1983.

KTZU's owner, Programmer's Broadcasting, also owns KWGO 102.9 (Country) in Burlington and KBTO 101.9 (country) in Bottineau. Programmer's Broadcasting is the only locally owned and operated commercial media company in the Minot area.

Notable public service efforts have included "Are You Tough Enough to Wear Pink?", a 2007 campaign rallying the rodeo and western industry to raise money and awareness for breast cancer treatment and research. The campaign ultimately raised over $26,000 for a new cancer exercise rehabilitation center at the Minot Family YMCA.
