= Turtle River State Park =

Park in North Dakota, USA

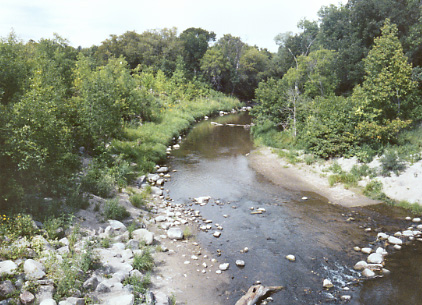
- The Turtle River in Turtle River State Park

- Location within North Dakota
- Location: Grand Forks County, North Dakota, United States
- Nearest city: Grand Forks, North Dakota
- Coordinates: 47°56′15″N 97°30′17″W
- Area: 775.28 acres (313.74 ha)
- Elevation: 955 ft (291 m)
- Established: 1934
- Administrator: North Dakota Parks and Recreation Department
- Designation: North Dakota state park
- Website: Official website

Turtle River State Park is a public recreation area occupying 775 acres (314 ha) on the Turtle River, two miles (3.2 km) north of the community of Arvilla in Grand Forks County, North Dakota. Park activities include camping, cross-country skiing, fishing, hiking, and mountain biking.

== History ==
Following its establishment in 1934, the state park saw development by the Civilian Conservation Corps. CCC projects included building bridges, roads, and footpaths as well as various stone and log buildings including a bathhouse that was later transformed into the CCC Memorial Picnic Shelter, which is still in use.
