= Bluebonnet Swamp Nature Center =

Protected area in Louisiana, U.S.

- BREC's Bluebonnet Swamp Nature Center
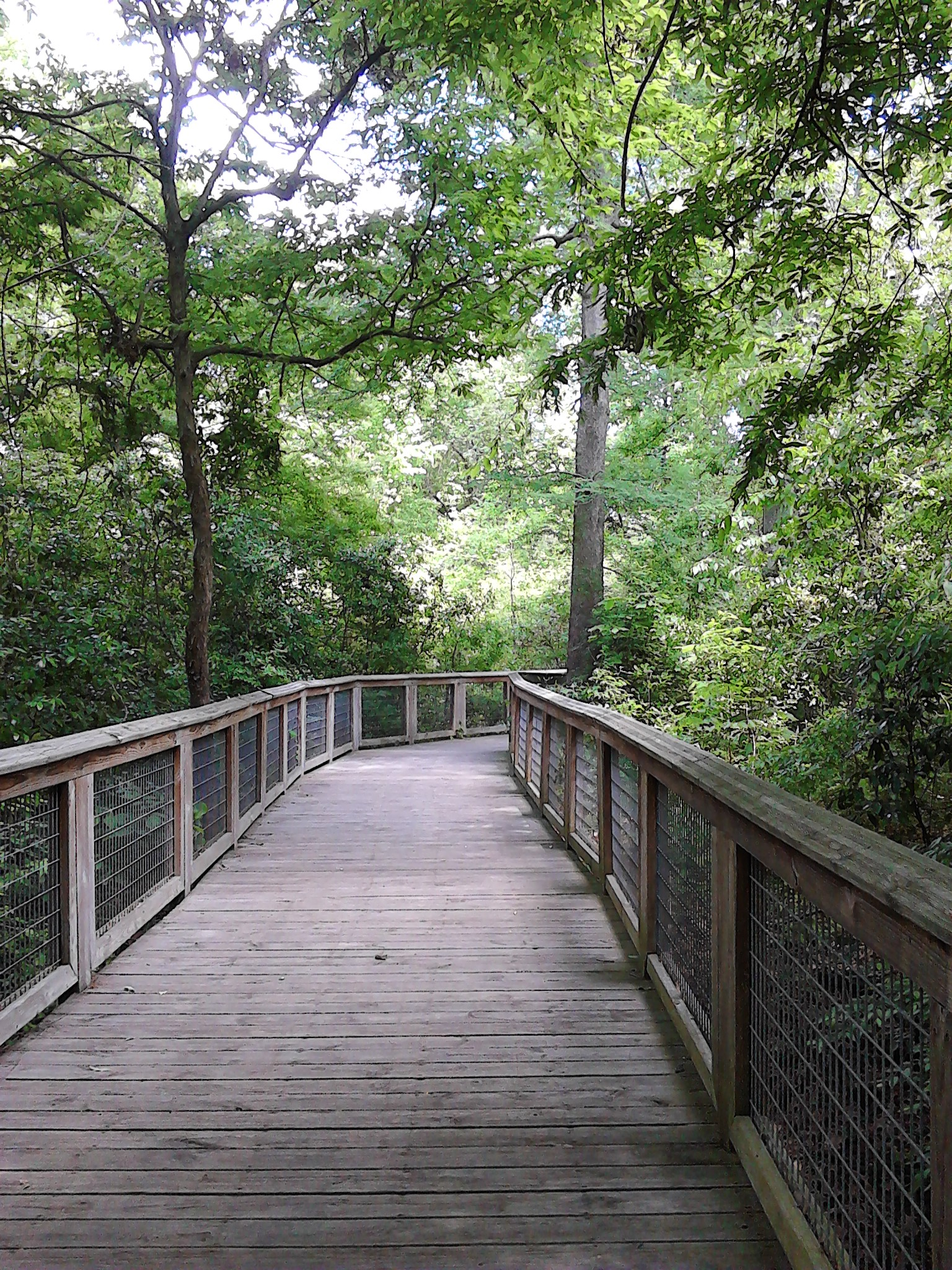
- Boardwalk at BREC's Bluebonnet Nature Center
- Interactive map of Bluebonnet Swamp Nature Center
- Location: Baton Rouge, Louisiana, United States
- Nearest city: Baton Rouge, Louisiana
- Coordinates: 30°22′28.59″N 91°06′11.21″W
- Area: 103 acres (42 ha)
- Created: 17 May 1997
- Governing body: Recreation and Park Commission for the Parish of East Baton Rouge (aka "BREC")
- Operator: BREC
- Owner: BREC
- Website: www.brec.org/facility/BluebonnetSwamp

Bluebonnet Swamp Nature Center is a 103-acre nature conservation park administered by the Recreation and Park Commission for the Parish of East Baton Rouge (also known as "BREC"), and located at 10503 N. Oak Hills Parkway, Baton Rouge, Louisiana 70810. It is open to the public Tuesday - Saturday from 9 a.m. to 5 p.m., and Sunday from noon to 5 p.m. (except for some holidays) for a nominal fee. The facility was opened as BREC's first nature conservation based park on 17 May 1997.

== Facilities, programs, and nature preserve ==
The main exhibit building is a 9500-square-foot structure containing both live animal exhibits and photographic displays of the park's flora and fauna, as well as ecology and art exhibits. It houses the largest public display of vintage Louisiana duck decoys, donated by the late Charles W. Frank, Jr. The education building (newly renovated in 2014) was added to the facility to serve as a separate space for educational programs.

There are programs and special events that run throughout the year, including monthly bird walks and bird talks, and periodic pet days, toddler sessions, day camps, art shows, and night hikes. Special events include the gem and mineral themed "Rockin' at the Swamp" every March, the antique waterfowl decoy themed "Duck Duck Goose Day" every August, and the child-friendly Halloween themed "Swamp Haunted Hikes" every October.

Gravel trails and boardwalks run through over a mile of baldcypress-tupelo swamp, beech-magnolia and hardwood forests. Birds, squirrels, turtles, snakes, insects, and spiders are regularly seen inhabitants along with other common urban wildlife such as raccoons, armadillos, opossums, and swamp cottontails. Also known to visit the site are foxes, coyotes, deer, and otters.

== Research activities ==
Bluebonnet Swamp Nature Center was the premiere research station for the Louisiana Bird Observatory (formerly known as the Bluebonnet Bird Monitoring Project). This project is designed to study year-round population trends and moulting patterns in southern bird populations. This project has conducted bird banding programs since March 2010. Since then, a protocol has been drafted based on recommendations from the North American Banding Council, the Handbook of Bird Monitoring Techniques and the Klamath Demographic Network.

The publications produced from this project include an examination of indigo bunting moulting patterns and barred owl foraging behavior. Thousands of birds have been banded largely by Louisiana State University undergraduate and graduate students, as parts of research projects.

== Associated publications ==
Academic publications based on research conducted at Bluebonnet:

- Kahn, P. H. and S. R. Kellert. 2002. Children and Nature: Psychological, Sociocultural, and Evolutionary Investigations. Massachusetts Institute of Technology Press, Cambridge, Massachusetts.
- Louv, R. 2005. Last child in the woods: saving our children from nature deficit disorder. Algonquin Books, Chapel Hill, North Carolina.
- Froehlich, D. and E. Sprong. 2009. Teens band: inspiring teen bird banders as ambassadors for bird conservation. Pages 471–478 in The Proceedings of the Fourth International Partners in Flight Conference: Tundra to Tropics
- Saracco, J. F., D. F. DeSante and D. R. Kaschube. 2008. Assessing landbird monitoring programs and demographic causes of population trends. Journal of Wildlife Management. 72:1665–1673.
- Wolfe, J. D. and C. J. Ralph. 2009. Effects of the El Niño Southern Oscillation on nearctic-neotropical migrant condition in Central America. The Auk. 126:809–814.
- Ralph, C. J. 2001. The North American Bander's Study Guide. The North American Bander's Council, Point Reyes Station, California, USA.
- Ralph, C. J., G. R. Geupel, P. Pyle, T. E. Martin, and D. F DeSante. 1993. Handbook of field methods for monitoring landbirds. General Technical Report PSW-GTR-144. Pacific Southwest Research Station, U.S. Forest Service, U.S. Department of Agriculture.
- Ralph, C. J., K. R. Hollinger and R. I. Frey. 2004. Redwood Sciences Laboratory and the Klamath Demographic Monitoring Network mist-netting station management procedures. U.S. Forest Service, Redwood Sciences Laboratory, Arcata, California.

== See also ==
- List of Louisiana state historic sites
- Louisiana State Arboretum
