= Gros Ventres Island =

Coordinates: 47°34′26″N 101°04′02″W

Gros Ventres Island is a former island in the U.S. state of North Dakota.

Gros Ventres Island was named after the Gros Ventre Indians.
