= Garrison Creek (North Dakota) =

Stream in McLean County, North Dakota, U.S.

Location
- Country: United States
- State: North Dakota
- County: McLean

Physical characteristics
- Source
  - coordinates: 47°38′27″N 101°25′40″W

Garrison Creek is a stream in McLean County, North Dakota, in the United States.

Garrison Creek was so named on account of soldiers being garrisoned there. The creek lent its name to the city of Garrison, North Dakota.

== See also ==
- List of rivers of North Dakota
