= Garrison Creek (Missouri) =

Stream in the U.S. state of Missouri

Coordinates: 39.1252899°N 93.7643856°W

Garrison Creek is a stream in Lafayette County in the U.S. state of Missouri. Garrison Creek is named after the local Garrison family.

== See also ==
- List of rivers of Missouri
