= Fort Stevenson State Park Arboretum =

Arboretum in North Dakota

Coordinates: 47°35′38″N 101°25′31″W

- Interactive map of Fort Stevenson State Park Arboretum

The Fort Stevenson State Park Arboretum is an arboretum located near the campground at Fort Stevenson State Park [438 acres (177 ha)] on the north shore of Lake Sakakawea approximately 3 miles (5 km) south of Garrison, North Dakota.

The arboretum contains over 50 native and non-native trees, shrubs, wildflowers and grasses, including Eleagnus angustifolia, Juniperus scopulorum, Salix exigua, and Ulmus pumila.

== See also ==
- List of botanical gardens in the United States
