= Turtle River (North Dakota) =

River in North Dakota, United States

Coordinates: 48°10′26″N 97°08′49″W

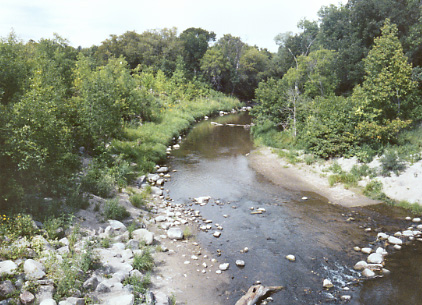
The Turtle River in Turtle River State Park near Larimore in Grand Forks County in 2004

The Turtle River is a 74.9-mile-long (120.5 km) tributary of the Red River of the North in northeastern North Dakota in the United States. It flows for almost its entire length in Grand Forks County. Via the Red River, Lake Winnipeg and the Nelson River, the Turtle River is part of the watershed of Hudson Bay.

== Course ==
The Turtle rises as two streams, the North Branch (source 48°05'24.6"N 97°56'23.0"W), which begins as an intermittent stream in eastern Nelson County, and the South Branch (source 47°56'56.1"N 97°49'28.1"W); the two converge near the town of Larimore. The river flows generally eastward in a highly meandering course through Turtle River State Park and past the Grand Forks Air Force Base; it turns northward as it nears the Red River and flows through the town of Manvel then under Interstate 29, then 840 metres before the mouth the North Marais River splits off joining Red River just upstream of where the Forest river joins the Red River, the Turtle River then joins the Red River just upstream of Oslo, Minnesota.

== See also ==
- List of rivers of North Dakota
- List of Hudson Bay rivers
