= KWGO =

Burlington, North Dakota; United States
- Broadcast area: Minot, North Dakota
- Frequency: 102.9 MHz
- Branding: 102-9 WGO

Programming
- Format: Commercial; Country
- Affiliations: CBS News Radio

Ownership
- Owner: Programmer's Broadcasting
- Sister stations: KBTO, KTZU

History
- First air date: 2005

Technical information
- Licensing authority: FCC
- Facility ID: 162321
- Class: C1
- ERP: 100,000 watts
- HAAT: 156 meters (512 ft)
- Transmitter coordinates: 48°3′4″N 101°20′23″W

Links
- Public license information: Public file; LMS
- Webcast: Listen Live
- Website: 1029wgo.com

KWGO (102.9 FM, "102-9 WGO") is a radio station with a country format. Licensed to Burlington, North Dakota, it serves the Minot, North Dakota area. The station is owned by Programmer's Broadcasting. The studios are located at 624 31st Ave. SW in Minot, and the transmitter site is south of town off Highway 83.

KWGO broadcasts a country music format to the Minot area.

Public service efforts have included "Are You Tough Enough to Wear Pink?", a 2007 campaign rallying the rodeo and western industry to raise money and awareness for breast cancer treatment and research. The campaign raised over $26,000 for a new cancer exercise rehabilitation center at the Minot Family YMCA.

== History ==
This station received its construction permit from the Federal Communications Commission on April 18, 2005. The new station was assigned the call letters KWGO by the FCC on April 26, 2005. KWGO received its license to cover from the FCC on February 6, 2006.

The station transitioned from an adult contemporary format to country music on June 23, 2013.
