= Devils Lake (North Dakota) =

Lake in North Dakota, United States

- Mni Wak’áŋ (Dakota), čiwahaahwaarúxti (Arikara), mirixubaash (Hidatsa)
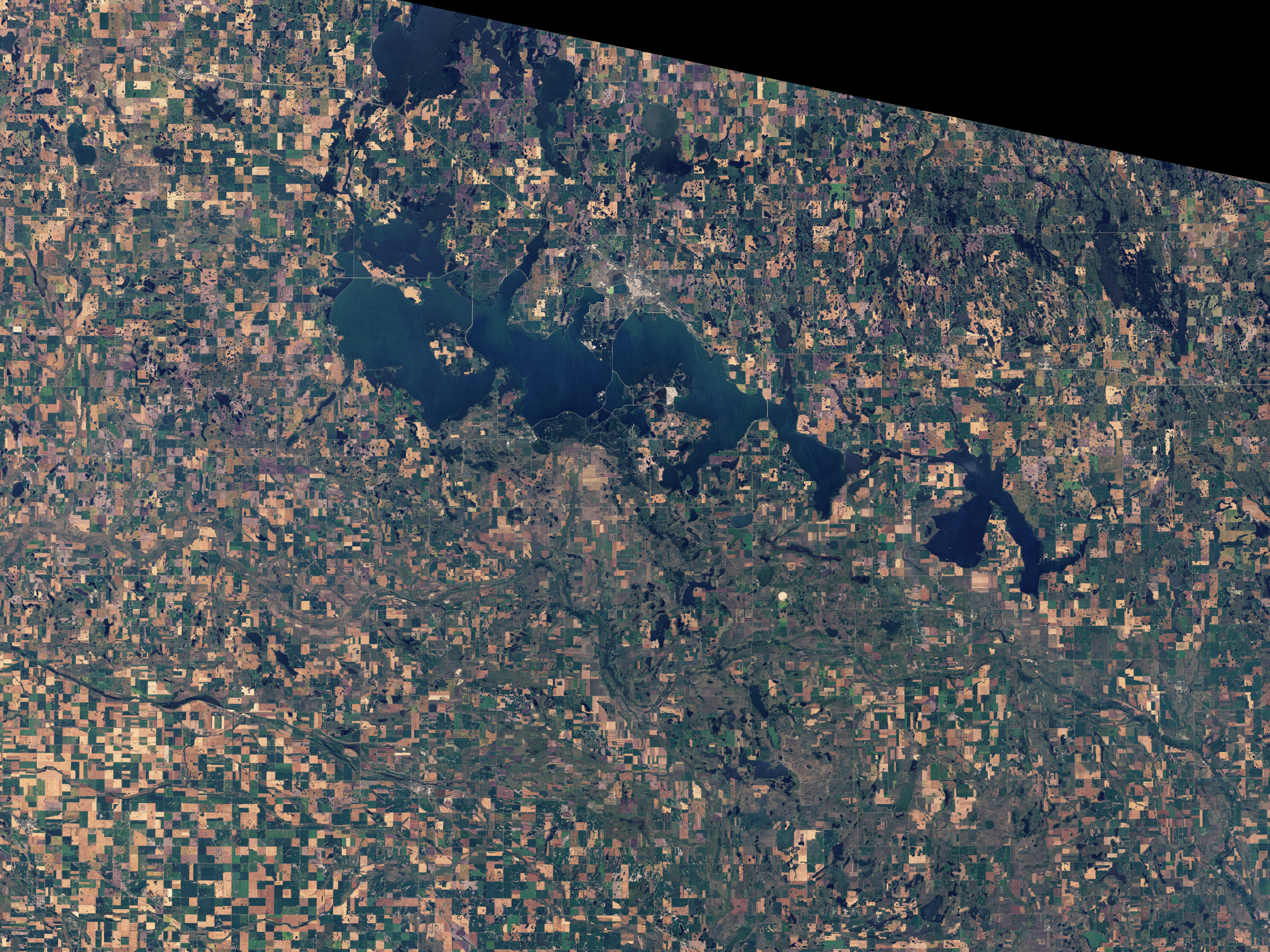
- View from space (March 2009)

- Location within North Dakota Location within the United States
- Location: Ramsey / Benson counties, North Dakota, U.S.
- Coordinates: 48°2′5″N 98°56′39″W
- Lake type: Endorheic basin Potentially an open lake
- Catchment area: 3,810 mi^{2} (9,900 km^{2})
- Basin countries: United States
- Max. depth: more than 59 feet (18 m)
- Surface elevation: 1,454.20 ft (443.24 m)
- Settlements: Devils Lake, Minnewaukan

Devils Lake is an endorheic lake in the U.S. state of North Dakota. It is the largest natural body of water and the second-largest body of water in North Dakota after Lake Sakakawea. The cities of Devils Lake and Minnewaukan take their name from the lake as does the Spirit Lake Reservation, which is located on the lake's southern shores.

== History ==
The present site of Devils Lake is historically territory of the Dakota people. The Sisseton, Wahpeton, and Cut-Head bands of Dakotas were relocated to the Spirit Lake Reservation as a result of the 1867 treaty with the United States that established a reservation for Dakotas who had not been forcibly relocated to Crow Creek Reservation in what is now called South Dakota.

The name "Devils Lake" is a calque of the Dakota words mni (water) wak'áŋ (literally "pure source", also translated as "spirit" or "sacred"). The Dakota consider it holy because they believe it is the home of the underwater serpent Unktehi. The Dakota name is reflected in the name of the Spirit Lake Tribe and the nearby town of Minnewaukan. European-American settlers mistranslated the name to mean "Bad Spirit Lake", or "Devils Lake". The "bad" referred to the high salinity of the lake, making it unfit to drink, and "spirit" meant the mirages often seen across the water. The Christian concept of the devil is not present in Dakota philosophy. The Mandan, Hidatsa, and Arikara Nations also accessed the lake, and the Arikara name for it is čiwahaahwaarúxti and the Hidatsa name is mirixubaash ("sacred water").

== Geography ==
Devils Lake is located in Ramsey County and Benson County in northeastern North Dakota. The Spirit Lake Tribe occupies most of the southern shore and has been adversely affected by flooding since the 1990s.

== Hydrology ==
Devils Lake is the endorheic, or closed, lake of a drainage basin of some 3,800 sq mi (9,800 km^{2}), the Devils Lake Basin. The lake collects around 86 percent of the basin's water runoff. Above an elevation of 1,447 ft (441 m) AMSL, the lake spills into neighboring Stump Lake, which is also endorheic. At 1,458 ft (444 m), the combined lake would flow into the Sheyenne River via the Tolna Coulee. The lake has not reached this level in approximately 1,000 years, although on June 27, 2011, it reached an unofficial historical high elevation of 1,454.3 ft (443.3 m). The Sheyenne River is a tributary to the Red River, which flows into Canada, with eventual exit into the Hudson Bay. Dike protection is set at 1,454 ft (443 m).

Under normal conditions, Devils Lake is shallow, saline, and hypereutrophic (very high in nutrients). During periods of excessive precipitation, however, the lake can be up to 60 ft (18 m) deep, eutrophic (rich in minerals, nutrients, and organisms), with decreased salinity due to dilution.

=== Salinity ===
Because Devils Lake is endorheic, the lake tends to be much higher in salinity than the lakes with outlets to river systems. This is similar to the Great Salt Lake in Utah. Lower water levels increase salinity, threatening fish and wildlife. Salinity is measured as total dissolved solids (TDS) and varies throughout the lake. In 2010, concentrations ranged from 987 mg/L in the northwest to 2,245 mg/L in the southeast. Salinity levels in the lake have been one prominent aspect of the debate over diversion of lake water into the Sheyenne River, with questions of the potential environmental impact of the diverted water on downstream rivers, lakes, and communities.

=== Flooding ===
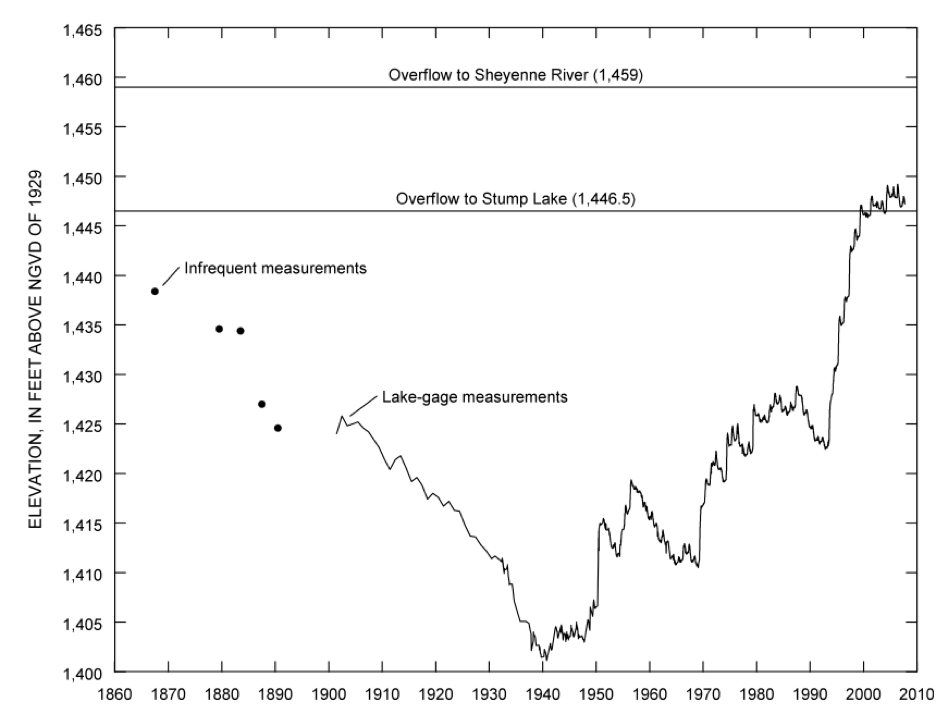
Historical elevations of Devils Lake, 1860–2008

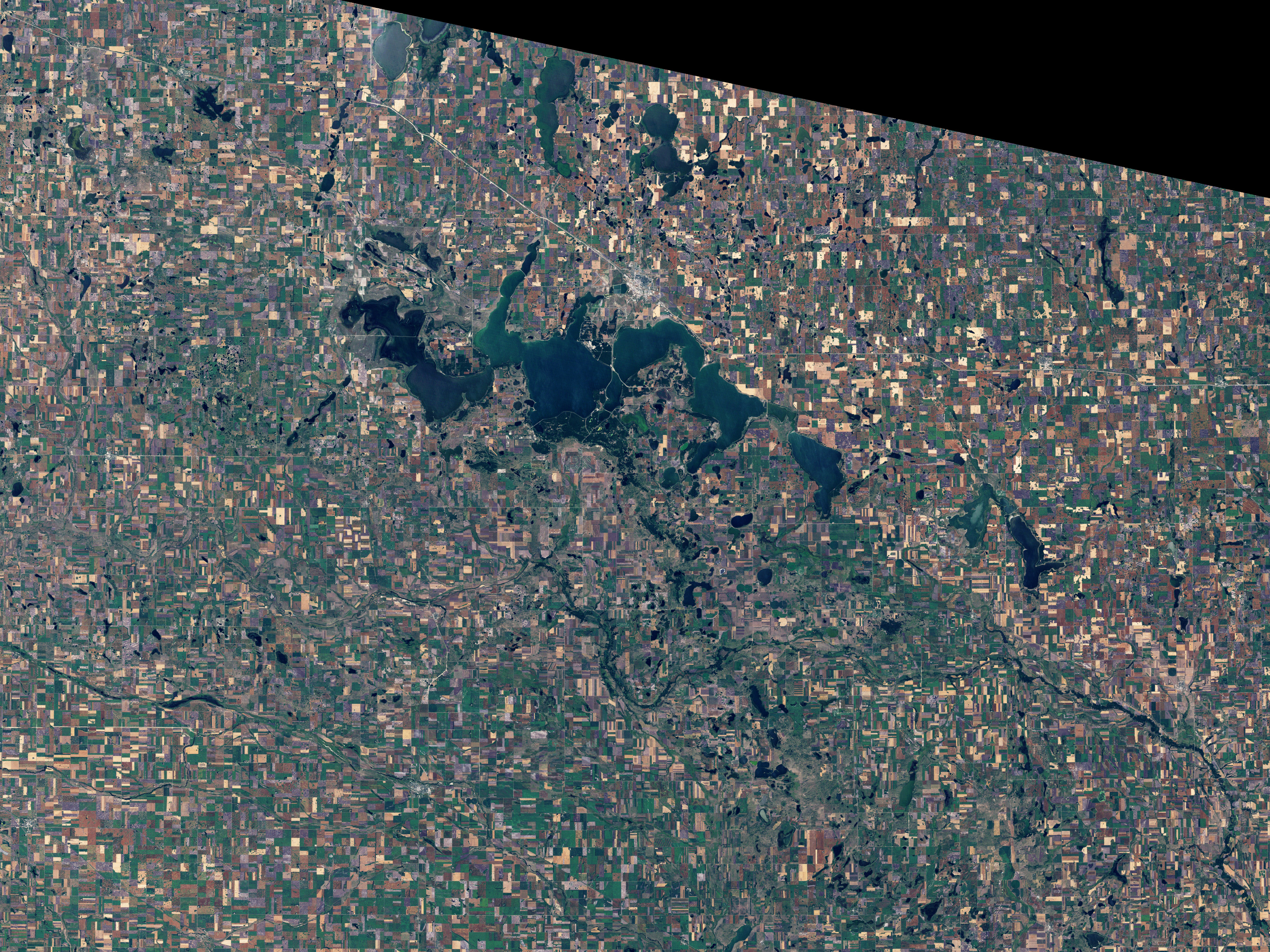
Devils Lake: 1984

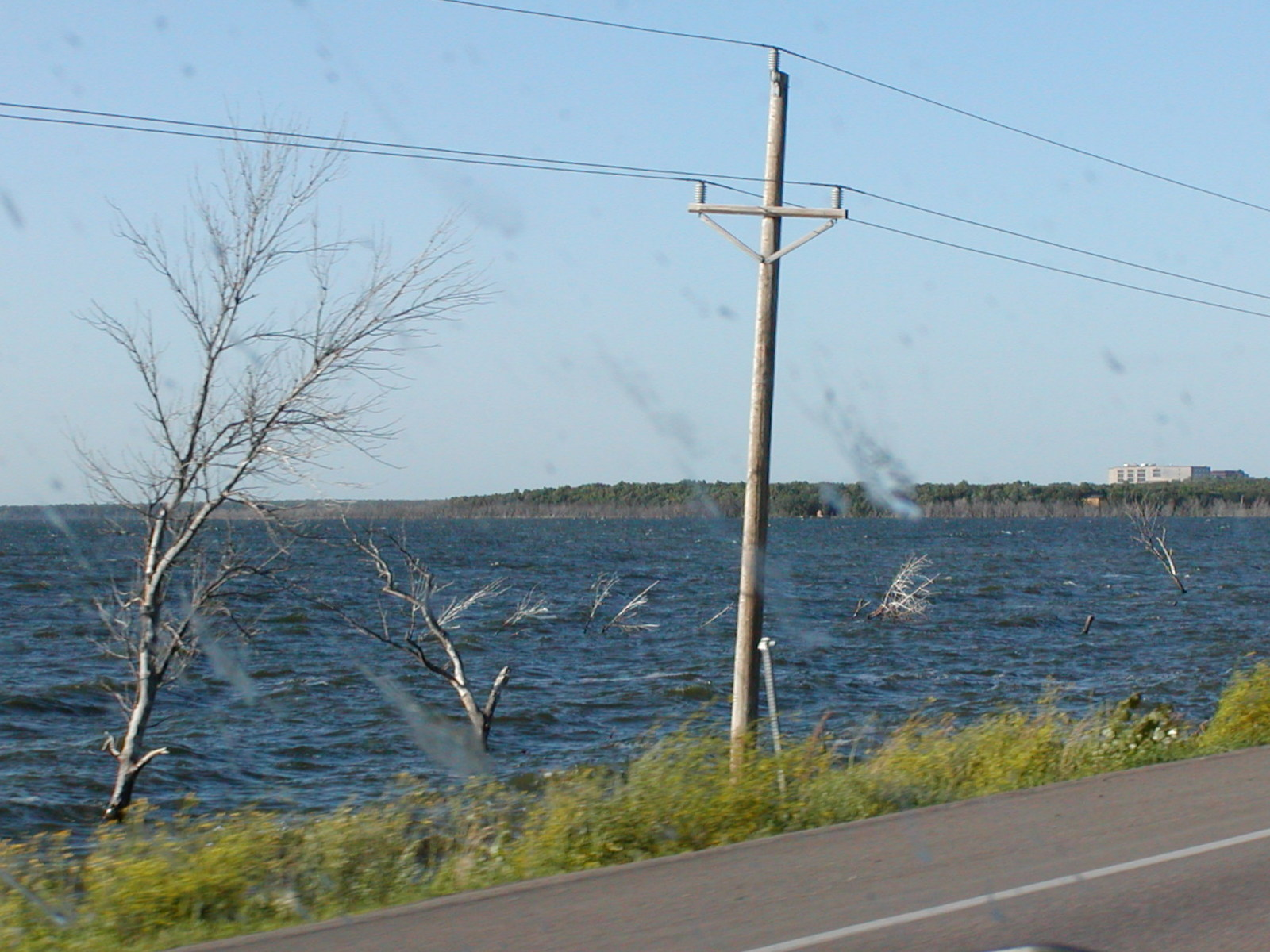
Partially submerged trees in 2002

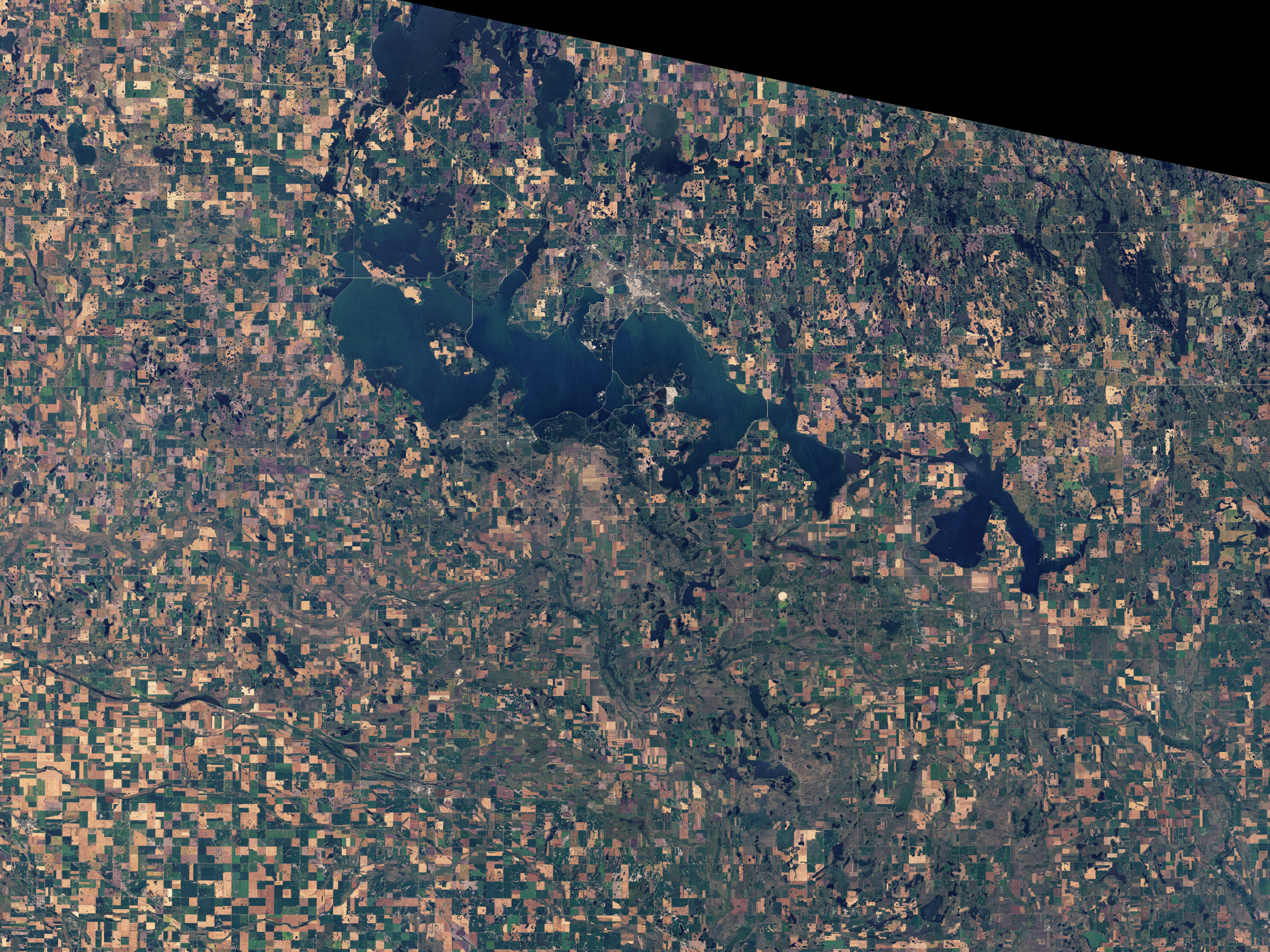
Devils Lake: 2009

Devils Lake is well known for its wide variations in lake levels, with large swings between low and high water levels. This owes in large part to its nature as a closed-basin lake, lacking a natural outlet. The release of water is dependent upon evaporation and seepage.

The low, flat terrain around Devils Lake consists of various coulees, channels, and basins, which may be separated during times of low water, or connected during high water. Thus the boundaries of the lake can vary greatly from year to year, depending on the amount of precipitation.

The draining of wetlands to develop agricultural land in the area has aggravated flooding at Devils Lake. Drainage of the basin's wetlands and conversion of the basin's native prairie to cropland has resulted in water moving more rapidly into the lake, increasing water levels. In addition, the diversion of natural water flows is also considered to have contributed to the flooding.

An increase in precipitation between 1993 and 1999 caused the lake to double in size, forcing the displacement of more than 300 homes and flooding 70,000 acres (28,000 ha) of farmland. The Spirit Lake Tribe, whose reservation is along part of the lake, suffered considerable damage to homes and lands. Attempts to mitigate the flooding have reportedly cost North Dakota and the U.S. government more than $450 million. Efforts to control flooding include artificial outlets, dike construction and moving railroad lines, roads, and power lines. Future climate as projected by 17 different global climate models indicates overall increase in both precipitation and temperature in the Devils Lake region leading to the lake's overspill probability (24–47% without the outlet and 3.5–14.4% with the full capacity outlet) into the nearby Sheyenne River.

In response to the flooding, the U.S. Congress directed the Army Corps of Engineers to research construction of an outlet in 1997 to control the lake level through methods other than evaporation or natural overflow. The Corps' design included mechanisms for filtration and monitoring of the water, and was estimated to cost $186.5 million.

The state of North Dakota objected to the cost and certain water quality provisions of the plan, and declined to participate in construction of the Corps' outlet. In 2003, the state constructed its own outlet to divert water from Devils Lake into the Sheyenne River, at a cost of $28 million. The outlet was completed in 2005, but was not operated in 2006 due to water quality and biota issues. The National Weather Service is the official federal government agency responsible for observing and predicting water levels at Devils Lake.

== Recreation ==
Devils Lake has been known for a long time for fishing and other watersports. It has been named the perch capital of the world. There are a number of boat ramps and other facilities around the lake to facilitate recreational activities on the lake. Recreation in the form of open water and ice fishing is estimated to have generated more than $20 million annually.

White Horse Hill National Game Preserve is located on the lake's southern shore. Grahams Island State Park is located on an island in the lake. Other parks on the lake include Black Tiger State Recreation Area and Shelvers Grove State Recreation Area, which is now closed due to the lake's flooding.

== Issues and controversies ==
=== Outlet controversy ===
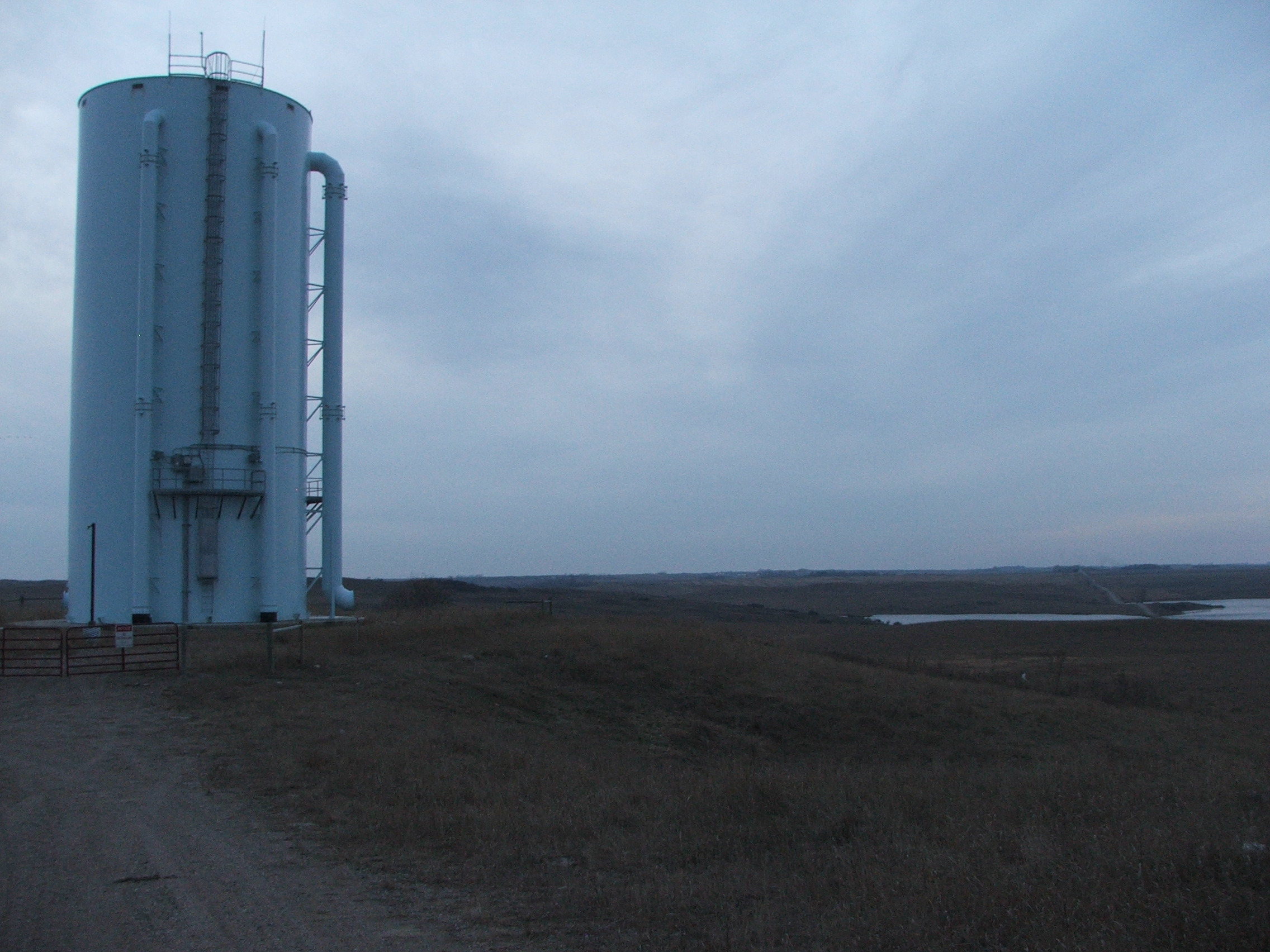
One of two large pumps used in the state-constructed outlet.

During the most recent wet cycle which began in 1993, the lake rose over 26.5 ft (8.1 m), inundating 140 sq mi (360 km^{2}) of primarily agricultural land. This required the expenditure of more than $400 million in flood protection measures. Some stakeholders argued for construction of an emergency outlet into the Sheyenne River, which is a tributary of the Red River of the North.

The Army Corps of Engineers proposed to draw water from a different point of the lake, provide filtration, and discharge a maximum of 300 cu ft/s (8.5 m^{3}/s) of water from Devil's Lake, in order to lessen dependence on overflow or evaporation to reduce water levels. The Corps of Engineers estimated its project costs to amount to $186.5 million, with the United States Congress designating $100 million to the project; North Dakota would have paid the remaining amount. Because the project potentially affected the Red River of the North, which runs into Canadian waters, the project was considered to be subject to the Boundary Waters Treaty, and international issues were raised.

Led by Republican Governor John Hoeven, North Dakota objected to the water quality provisions and the amount of funding required. Instead it constructed its own outlet, with approval of the North Dakota Department of Health, the U.S. State Department, and Council on Environmental Quality. This outlet, which cost $28 million, has a lower maximum discharge than the federal proposal (limited to a maximum of 100 cu ft/s (2.8 m^{3}/s) by the Section 402 NDPDES Permit); its gravel filter removes only larger organisms. But it has provided some relief to the flood problem. Construction began in 2003 and was completed as of summer 2005.

The state outlet project was opposed by the governments of Minnesota and Manitoba, Canada. They argue the outlet would create the potential for the transfer of unknown foreign aquatic species and high levels of sulfates into the Red River basin, an important agricultural area, and Lake Winnipeg, the world's 10th-largest freshwater lake.

In March 2004, Manitoba, along with Minnesota and several environmental groups, sued the North Dakota Department of Health in state court over the Devils Lake Outlet 402 NDPDES Permit. The court ruled the outlet could proceed in August 2004 and May 2005.

The Boundary Waters Treaty of 1909 established an intermediary, the International Joint Commission (IJC), through which the United States and Canada can solve cross-boundary water disputes, but the commission has no power to act without invocation by both nations. Canada attempted to invoke the IJC for purposes of conflict resolution, but the United States did not, effectively preventing the IJC from taking part in the controversy.

The Government of Canada argues that the diversion by the state, without consultation or approval from Canada, is a violation of the Boundary Waters Treaty of 1909 and Canada's national sovereignty. The U.S. government contends the diversion will not be harmful, nor will it violate the treaty under current conditions.

In November 2005, a joint United States and Canadian study concluded that none of the 13 species Canada classifies as invasive were present in Devils Lake. The study did find three species of fish parasites that are not currently known to exist in Lake Winnipeg (to which the Red River flows). However, all three are ubiquitous to the waters of North America and have a wide variety of hosts. A difficulty inherent in determining what species are in Devils Lake versus Lake Winnipeg results from spatial relationships and scale.

Lake Winnipeg covers approximately 9,400 sq mi (24,000 km^{2}), dozens of times as large as Devils Lake. In addition, the Devils Lake Basin is significantly smaller than the watersheds feeding Lake Winnipeg, including the Saskatchewan River basin at approximately 56,000 sq mi (150,000 km^{2}). Drawing conclusions about the biological community already in Lake Winnipeg is difficult, due to the relative lack of biological sampling there compared to that of the smaller Devils Lake.

=== Carp ===
Due to the rising waters of the Devils Lake and its basin, streams can flow into the Red River Valley or the Devils Lake Basin. The Red River Valley basin contains a "rough fish", the common carp, which the North Dakota Game and Fish Department fears will enter Devils Lake basin waters in the near future, allowing the carp to populate Devils Lake. The carp's fast reproductive growth and the lack of carp predators in the lake will likely help it to dramatically increase in population. This could have drastic consequences for existing populations of game fish, such as the walleye and northern pike, which could greatly harm the sport fishing industry.

Some preventive measures have been proposed, including inserting chemicals in the creeks along the boundary of the Devils Lake Basin and the Red River Valley to kill fish. Biologists did tests in 2005 which conclude that there are currently no carp in the Devils Lake Basin, but some have been found within two miles (3 km). The carp appear to have been stalled by the abundant cattail plants, which makes travel impossible for the fish.

=== Railroad problems ===
Due to the lake's rising waters, the BNSF Railway temporarily suspended freight traffic between Devils Lake and Churchs Ferry, a total of 19 miles (31 km), during 2009–2013. However, Amtrak's Empire Builder continued to operate over this segment. BNSF offered Amtrak the right to instead operate the Empire Builder over the Northern Transcon route, to which freight traffic had been shifted. To compensate for the loss of station stops at Grand Forks, Devils Lake, and Rugby, North Dakota that would have been caused by the shift, BNSF suggested that Amtrak add a station stop at New Rockford, North Dakota. However, Amtrak said that they would continue using the line by the lake. In 2010, analysts estimated that Amtrak would soon either have to rebuild the bridge that crosses the lake at Churchs Ferry, or reroute its passenger trains.

On June 15, 2011, BNSF and Amtrak agreed to rebuild the rail line, whereby each would cover one-third of the cost. The state of North Dakota received a federal TIGER grant to pay for the remaining third. The growth of freight traffic associated with oil from the Bakken formation in this period resulted in BNSF upgrading its assessment of the importance of the Devils Lake line. After the track was rebuilt and raised, through service resumed from Devils Lake to Churchs Ferry.
