= Garrison, North Dakota =

- City
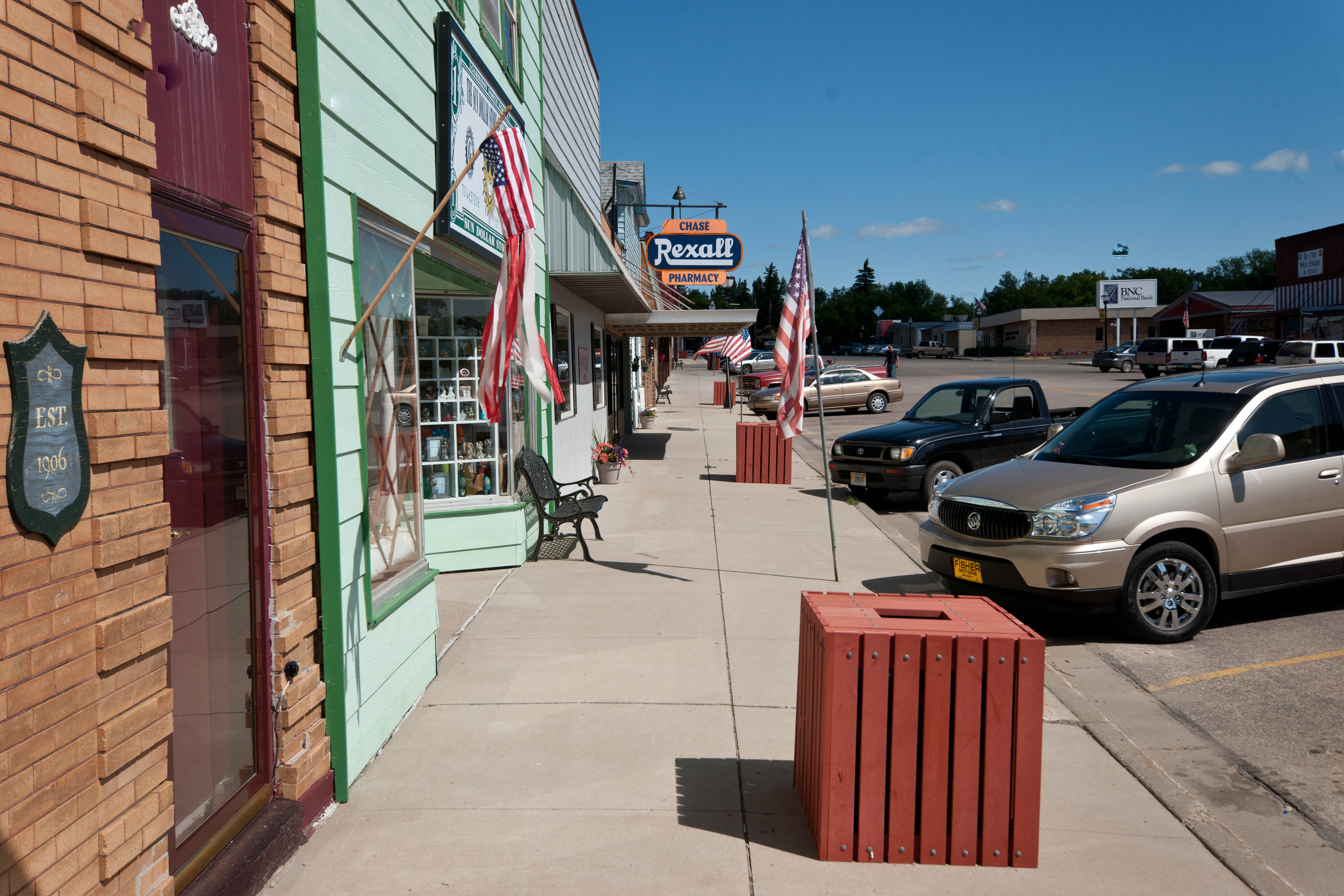
- Garrison in 2009

- Location of Garrison, North Dakota
- Coordinates: 47°39′10″N 101°25′0″W
- Country: United States
- State: North Dakota
- County: McLean
- Founded: 1905

Government
  - Mayor: Stuart Merry

Area
  - Total: 1.40 sq mi (3.62 km^{2})
  - Land: 1.40 sq mi (3.62 km^{2})
  - Water: 0 sq mi (0.00 km^{2})
- Elevation: 1,923 ft (586 m)

Population (2020)
  - Total: 1,462
  - Estimate (2022): 1,467
  - Density: 1,045.4/sq mi (403.63/km^{2})
- Time zone: UTC-6 (Central (CST))
  - Summer (DST): UTC-5 (CDT)
- ZIP code: 58540
- Area code: 701
- FIPS code: 38-29460
- GNIS feature ID: 1036052
- Highways: ND 37
- Website: garrisonnd.com

Garrison is a city in McLean County, North Dakota, United States. The population was 1,462 at the 2020 census.

== History ==
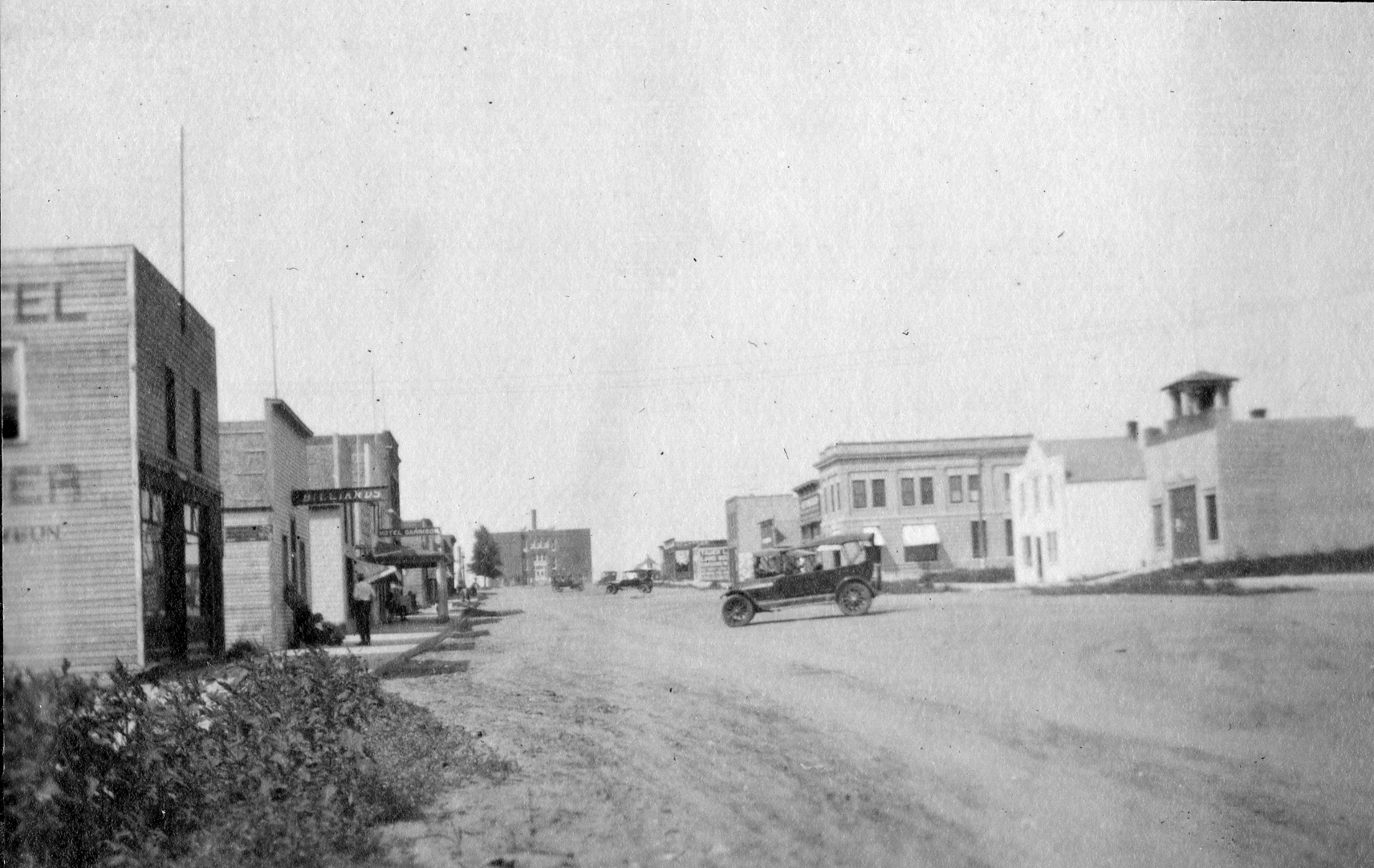
Main Street, Garrison, 1920

Garrison was laid out in 1905 when the Soo Line Railroad was extended to that point. The town took its name from Garrison Creek. A post office has been in operation at Garrison since 1903.

== Geography ==
According to the United States Census Bureau, the city has a total area of 1.38 square miles (3.57 km^{2}), all land.

=== Climate ===
Climate data for Garrison, North Dakota (1991–2020 normals, extremes 1948–present)
Month	Jan	Feb	Mar	Apr	May	Jun	Jul	Aug	Sep	Oct	Nov	Dec	Year
Record high °F (°C)	54 (12)	63 (17)	78 (26)	93 (34)	96 (36)	102 (39)	105 (41)	108 (42)	104 (40)	95 (35)	75 (24)	61 (16)	108 (42)
Mean daily maximum °F (°C)	19.5 (−6.9)	24.3 (−4.3)	36.7 (2.6)	52.8 (11.6)	65.8 (18.8)	74.5 (23.6)	81.3 (27.4)	81.2 (27.3)	71.3 (21.8)	55.0 (12.8)	37.9 (3.3)	25.0 (−3.9)	52.1 (11.2)
Daily mean °F (°C)	10.6 (−11.9)	14.7 (−9.6)	27.0 (−2.8)	41.3 (5.2)	54.1 (12.3)	63.8 (17.7)	69.8 (21.0)	68.5 (20.3)	58.9 (14.9)	44.1 (6.7)	28.9 (−1.7)	16.7 (−8.5)	41.5 (5.3)
Mean daily minimum °F (°C)	1.6 (−16.9)	5.1 (−14.9)	17.2 (−8.2)	29.7 (−1.3)	42.4 (5.8)	53.1 (11.7)	58.3 (14.6)	55.9 (13.3)	46.4 (8.0)	33.1 (0.6)	19.9 (−6.7)	8.5 (−13.1)	30.9 (−0.6)
Record low °F (°C)	−48 (−44)	−37 (−38)	−31 (−35)	−12 (−24)	12 (−11)	28 (−2)	35 (2)	29 (−2)	17 (−8)	−3 (−19)	−27 (−33)	−42 (−41)	−48 (−44)
Average precipitation inches (mm)	0.43 (11)	0.36 (9.1)	0.67 (17)	1.23 (31)	2.82 (72)	3.78 (96)	2.73 (69)	2.11 (54)	1.68 (43)	1.29 (33)	0.63 (16)	0.45 (11)	18.18 (462)
Average snowfall inches (cm)	6.8 (17)	6.2 (16)	7.4 (19)	2.9 (7.4)	1.3 (3.3)	0.0 (0.0)	0.0 (0.0)	0.0 (0.0)	0.0 (0.0)	2.5 (6.4)	5.7 (14)	9.9 (25)	42.7 (108)
Average precipitation days (≥ 0.01 in)	4.4	4.0	5.3	7.1	9.8	10.9	8.7	7.3	6.7	6.2	4.6	4.6	79.6
Average snowy days (≥ 0.1 in)	4.2	3.9	3.1	1.3	0.4	0.0	0.0	0.0	0.0	1.0	2.8	4.6	21.3
Source: NOAA

== Demographics ==
Historical population
Census	Pop.	Note	%±
1910	406		—
1920	714		75.9%
1930	1,024		43.4%
1940	1,117		9.1%
1950	1,890		69.2%
1960	1,794		−5.1%
1970	1,614		−10.0%
1980	1,830		13.4%
1990	1,530		−16.4%
2000	1,318		−13.9%
2010	1,453		10.2%
2020	1,462		0.6%
2022 (est.)	1,467		0.3%
U.S. Decennial Census; 2020 Census

=== 2010 census ===
As of the census of 2010, there were 1,453 people, 654 households, and 378 families living in the city. The population density was 1,052.9 inhabitants per square mile (406.5/km^{2}). There were 737 housing units at an average density of 534.1 per square mile (206.2/km^{2}). The racial makeup of the city was 93.3% White, 0.1% African American, 4.5% Native American, 0.1% Asian, 0.1% from other races, and 2.0% from two or more races. Hispanic or Latino people of any race were 2.1% of the population.

There were 654 households, of which 21.6% had children under the age of 18 living with them, 49.2% were married couples living together, 5.2% had a female householder with no husband present, 3.4% had a male householder with no wife present, and 42.2% were non-families. 37.8% of all households were made up of individuals, and 22.6% had someone living alone who was 65 years of age or older. The average household size was 2.09 and the average family size was 2.74.

The median age in the city was 51.3 years. 18.6% of residents were under the age of 18; 5.2% were between the ages of 18 and 24; 18.7% were from 25 to 44; 26.8% were from 45 to 64; and 30.8% were 65 years of age or older. The gender makeup of the city was 47.1% male and 52.9% female.

=== 2000 census ===
As of the census of 2000, there were 1,318 people, 590 households, and 362 families living in the city. The population density was 941.5 inhabitants per square mile (363.5/km^{2}). There were 655 housing units at an average density of 467.9/sq mi (180.6/km^{2}). The racial makeup of the city was 95.37% White, 2.43% Native American, 0.15% Asian, 0.23% from other races, and 1.82% from two or more races. Hispanic or Latino people of any race were 0.83% of the population.

There were 590 households, out of which 21.9% had children under the age of 18 living with them, 51.0% were married couples living together, 6.6% had a female householder with no husband present, and 38.6% were non-families. 36.1% of all households were made up of individuals, and 22.9% had someone living alone who was 65 years of age or older. The average household size was 2.08 and the average family size was 2.64.

In the city, the population was spread out, with 18.0% under the age of 18, 4.2% from 18 to 24, 19.1% from 25 to 44, 23.2% from 45 to 64, and 35.5% who were 65 years of age or older. The median age was 52 years. For every 100 females, there were 77.6 males. For every 100 females age 18 and over, there were 77.8 males.

The median income for a household in the city was $28,843, and the median income for a family was $37,583. Males had a median income of $29,943 versus $15,729 for females. The per capita income for the city was $16,591. About 6.5% of families and 8.5% of the population were below the poverty line, including 9.1% of those under age 18 and 9.1% of those age 65 or over.

== Airport ==
Garrison Municipal Airport (FAA LID: D05) is a public airport located one mile (1.6 km) west of the central business district of Garrison. It is owned by the Garrison Municipal Airport Authority. It covers an area of 205 acres (83 ha) which contains two runways, a 13/31 with a 3,700 by 60 ft (1,128 x 18 m) asphalt surface and a 3/21 with a 2,900 by 120 ft (884 x 37 m) turf surface. For the 12-month period ending July 31, 2007, the airport had 4,220 aircraft operations: 95% general aviation, 5% air taxi, and less than 1% military.

== Education ==
It is within the Garrison Public School District 51.

== Attractions ==
- Fort Stevenson State Park
- Fort Stevenson State Park Arboretum
- Garrison Golf Course
