= Bottineau, North Dakota =

- City
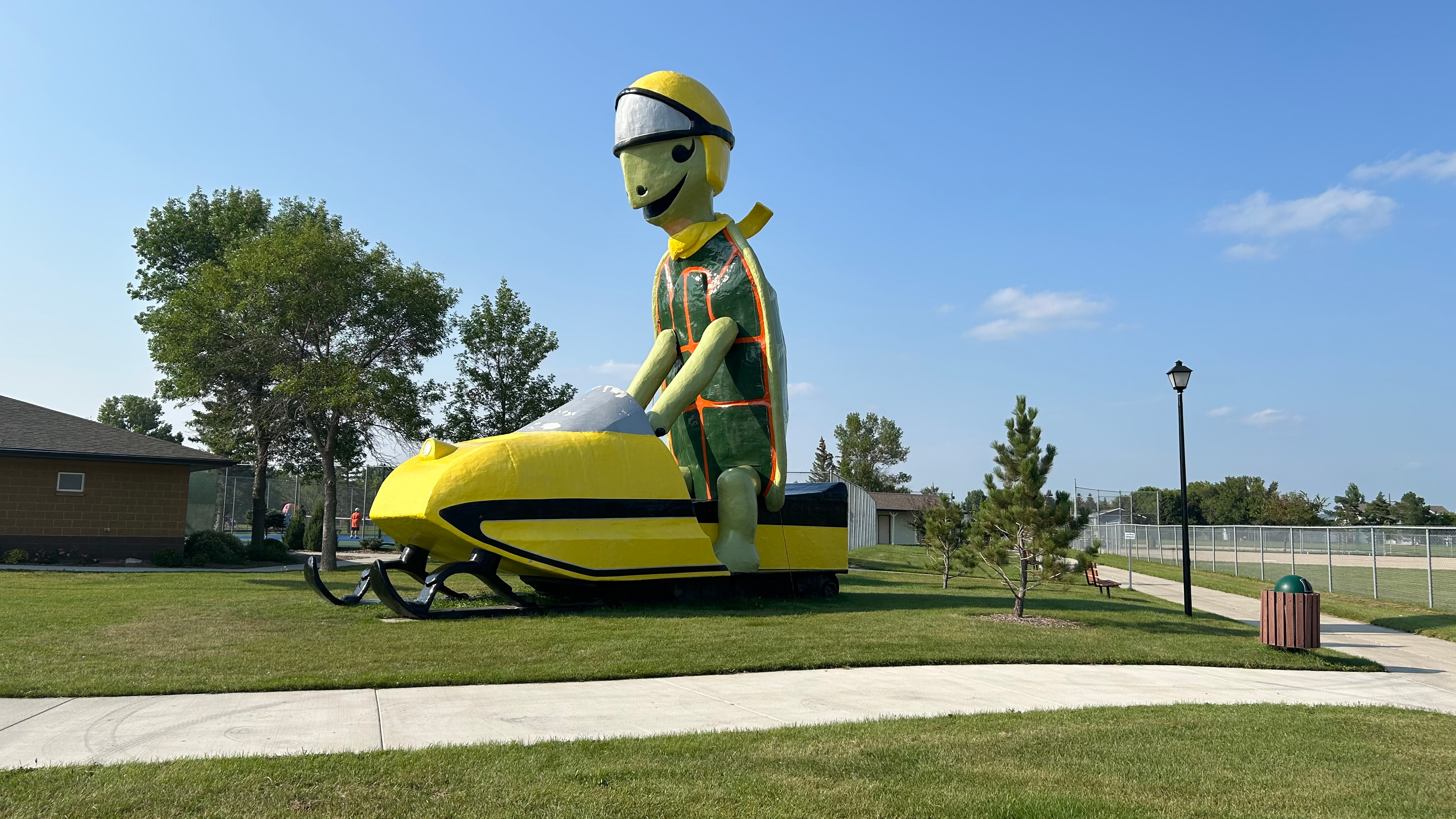
- "Tommy Turtle", symbol of Bottineau
- Nickname: Four Seasons Playground
- Motto: Vi Skal Vinne
- Interactive map of Bottineau, North Dakota
- Location within North Dakota
- Coordinates: 48.8248°N 100.4425°W
- Country: United States
- State: North Dakota
- County: Bottineau
- Founded: 1883
- Incorporated: 1887

Government
  - Mayor: Matt Seykora
  - President: Douglas Marsden
  - Councilmembers: Dean Fix; Harlen Getzlaff; Greg L. Stewart; Jenifer Lauckner; Douglas Marsden; Gary Mortensen; Julia Mehlhoff; Ethan Hall

Area
  - City: 1.316 sq mi (3.408 km^{2})
  - Land: 1.316 sq mi (3.408 km^{2})
  - Water: 0 sq mi (0.000 km^{2}) 0.00%
- Elevation: 1,631 ft (497 m)

Population (2020)
  - City: 2,194
  - Estimate (2025): 2,152
  - Density: 1,667/sq mi (643.8/km^{2})
  - Metro: 6,284
- Time zone: UTC–6 (Central (CST))
  - Summer (DST): UTC–5 (CDT)
- ZIP Code: 58318
- Area code: 701
- FIPS code: 38-08460
- GNIS feature ID: 1035936
- Highways: ND 5
- Website: bottineau.govoffice.com

Bottineau is a city in and the county seat of Bottineau County, North Dakota, United States. Located just over ten miles (16 km) south of the Canada–United States border. The population was 2,194 as of the 2020 census, and was estimated at 2,152 in 2025.

The city is home to Dakota College at Bottineau. Attractions in Bottineau include the Bottineau Winter Park and "Tommy Turtle," the world's largest turtle, which has become a landmark for the city. Built in 1978 and thirty feet (9 m) in height, the fiberglass turtle is located in the eastern half of the city and was built as a symbol for the nearby Turtle Mountains. The International Peace Garden is nearby to the northeast.

Bottineau is also home to Programmer's Broadcasting, which owns and operates KBTO, along with KTZU and KWGO in Minot.

== History ==
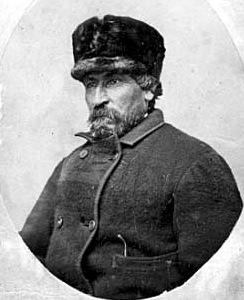
Pierre Bottineau

Bottineau was founded in 1883 as Oak Creek as a customs station and an overnight stagecoach stop. The town name was changed to Bottineau in 1884 in honor of Pierre Bottineau (c. 1814–1895), a Métis pioneer, hunter, and trapper, who became a successful land speculator.

The town was originally located about 1½ miles (2½ km) north of its current location. The entire town was moved south in 1887 to where the Great Northern Railway was installing new tracks.

The widest tornado on record in North Dakota, at 1.14 miles wide, dropped near Bottineau in 1986. It destroyed a mobile home but did not harm the pregnant woman who was inside.

In 2012, a new chalet called Annie's House was built in Bottineau Winter Park, ten miles (16 km) north. The facility was North Dakota's first ski facility for handicapped children and wounded veterans. It was built to honor Ann Nicole Nelson, who was the only North Dakotan to die in the September 11 attacks on the World Trade Center in New York City.

== Geography ==
According to the United States Census Bureau, the city has a total area of 1.316 square miles (3.41 km^{2}), all land. The elevation is 1,631 feet (497 m) above sea level.

== Climate ==
Bottineau has a humid continental climate (Koppen: Dfb) with four seasons and huge differences in temperatures throughout the year. Summers tend to be warm, sometimes hot, and winters are severely cold. On February 13, 2021, the record low temperature of −51 °F (−46 °C) was registered.

Climate data for Bottineau, North Dakota (1991–2020 normals, extremes 1893–present)
Month	Jan	Feb	Mar	Apr	May	Jun	Jul	Aug	Sep	Oct	Nov	Dec	Year
Record high °F (°C)	54 (12)	63 (17)	79 (26)	95 (35)	110 (43)	108 (42)	111 (44)	106 (41)	102 (39)	91 (33)	73 (23)	63 (17)	111 (44)
Mean maximum °F (°C)	38.3 (3.5)	40.0 (4.4)	53.5 (11.9)	74.3 (23.5)	84.6 (29.2)	88.1 (31.2)	90.9 (32.7)	93.3 (34.1)	88.7 (31.5)	76.5 (24.7)	54.6 (12.6)	39.4 (4.1)	94.9 (34.9)
Mean daily maximum °F (°C)	15.2 (−9.3)	19.8 (−6.8)	32.9 (0.5)	51.3 (10.7)	65.2 (18.4)	74.0 (23.3)	79.3 (26.3)	79.1 (26.2)	69.3 (20.7)	52.6 (11.4)	34.2 (1.2)	20.1 (−6.6)	49.4 (9.7)
Daily mean °F (°C)	5.6 (−14.7)	9.7 (−12.4)	23.3 (−4.8)	39.8 (4.3)	53.1 (11.7)	62.8 (17.1)	67.7 (19.8)	66.5 (19.2)	56.7 (13.7)	41.3 (5.2)	24.9 (−3.9)	11.4 (−11.4)	38.6 (3.7)
Mean daily minimum °F (°C)	−4.0 (−20.0)	−0.4 (−18.0)	13.7 (−10.2)	28.2 (−2.1)	41.0 (5.0)	51.5 (10.8)	56.1 (13.4)	53.8 (12.1)	44.1 (6.7)	30.0 (−1.1)	15.6 (−9.1)	2.6 (−16.3)	27.7 (−2.4)
Mean minimum °F (°C)	−28.7 (−33.7)	−24.1 (−31.2)	−12.0 (−24.4)	11.5 (−11.4)	25.4 (−3.7)	39.3 (4.1)	46.0 (7.8)	42.7 (5.9)	29.4 (−1.4)	13.9 (−10.1)	−5.1 (−20.6)	−21.3 (−29.6)	−31.3 (−35.2)
Record low °F (°C)	−47 (−44)	−51 (−46)	−37 (−38)	−16 (−27)	6 (−14)	25 (−4)	30 (−1)	28 (−2)	11 (−12)	−6 (−21)	−28 (−33)	−44 (−42)	−51 (−46)
Average precipitation inches (mm)	0.53 (13)	0.53 (13)	0.76 (19)	1.07 (27)	2.58 (66)	3.87 (98)	2.75 (70)	2.61 (66)	1.52 (39)	1.50 (38)	0.78 (20)	0.70 (18)	19.20 (488)
Average snowfall inches (cm)	9.1 (23)	6.9 (18)	7.3 (19)	4.0 (10)	1.1 (2.8)	0.0 (0.0)	0.0 (0.0)	0.0 (0.0)	0.1 (0.25)	4.1 (10)	8.2 (21)	9.0 (23)	49.8 (126)
Average precipitation days (≥ 0.01 in)	6.7	5.3	5.5	7.0	9.8	12.6	9.3	8.1	7.1	7.4	6.7	6.7	92.2
Average snowy days (≥ 0.1 in)	6.4	4.7	4.2	1.7	0.7	0.0	0.0	0.0	0.0	1.7	5.0	6.2	30.6
Source: NOAA

== Law and government ==
Bottineau uses the city council style of municipal government. Citizens are divided by location into four wards, who each elect two city council members, for a total of eight.

The current president of the city council is Douglas Marsden and the current mayor of the city is Matt Seykora. The city council meets on the first Monday of every month in the city's Armory.

== Economy ==
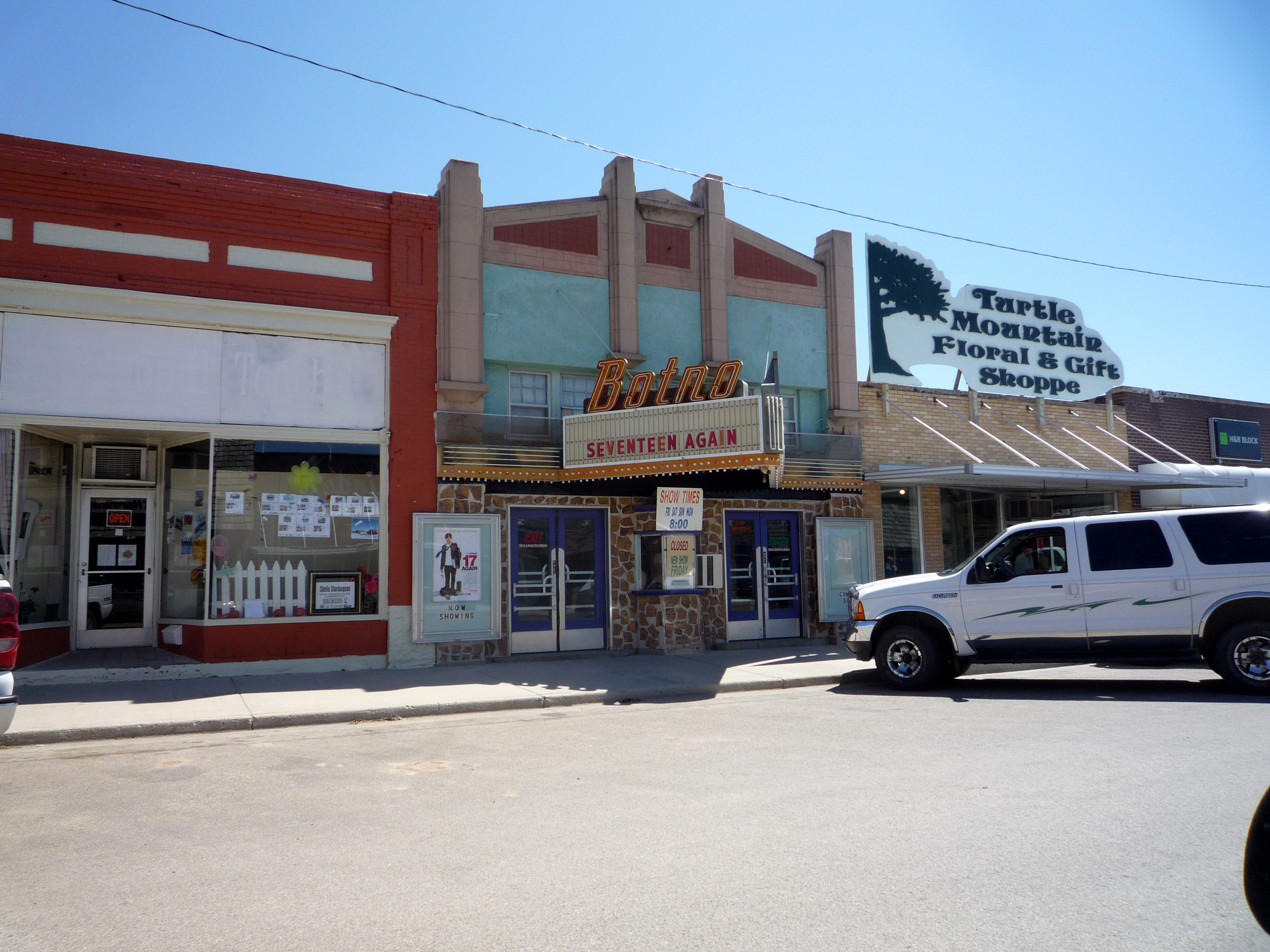
Downtown Bottineau. The "Botno" theater name reflects the local pronunciation of Bottineau.

The economy in Bottineau is based on agriculture and recreational activities.

The city's commercial district consists mainly of small local shops, but a Walmart Supercenter store is now operating within Bottineau; some consider this unusual for a town of such a small size. Bottineau is also home to the Bottineau County Fair, which is the state's oldest county fair.

== Demographics ==
Historical population
Census	Pop.	Note	%±
1890	145		—
1900	888		512.4%
1910	1,331		49.9%
1920	1,172		−11.9%
1930	1,322		12.8%
1940	1,739		31.5%
1950	2,268		30.4%
1960	2,613		15.2%
1970	2,760		5.6%
1980	2,829		2.5%
1990	2,598		−8.2%
2000	2,336		−10.1%
2010	2,211		−5.4%
2020	2,194		−0.8%
2025 (est.)	2,152		−1.9%
U.S. Decennial Census; 2020 Census

According to realtor website Zillow, the average price of a home as of June 30, 2026, in Bottineau was $255,540.

As of the 2024 American Community Survey, there were 873 estimated households in Bottineau with an average of 2.25 persons per household. The city has a median household income of $65,905. Approximately 12.0% of the city's population lives at or below the poverty line. Bottineau has an estimated 58.3% employment rate, with 26.0% of the population holding a bachelor's degree or higher and 96.1% holding a high school diploma. There were 947 housing units at an average density of 719.60 per square mile (277.8/km^{2}).

The top five reported languages (people were allowed to report up to two languages, thus the figures will generally add to more than 100%) were English (97.2%), Spanish (0.9%), Indo-European (0.7%), Asian and Pacific Islander (1.2%), and Other (0.0%).

The median age in the city was 35.5 years.

Bottineau, North Dakota – racial and ethnic composition Note: the US Census treats Hispanic/Latino as an ethnic category. This table excludes Latinos from the racial categories and assigns them to a separate category. Hispanics/Latinos may be of any race.
Race / ethnicity (NH = non-Hispanic)	Pop. 1980	Pop. 1990	Pop. 2000	Pop. 2010	Pop. 2020
White alone (NH)	2,755 (97.38%)	2,545 (97.96%)	2,216 (94.86%)	2,020 (91.36%)	1,778 (81.04%)
Black or African American alone (NH)	0 (0.00%)	5 (0.19%)	7 (0.30%)	15 (0.68%)	28 (1.28%)
Native American or Alaska Native alone (NH)	29 (1.03%)	31 (1.19%)	59 (2.53%)	87 (3.93%)	130 (5.93%)
Asian alone (NH)	21 (0.74%)	11 (0.42%)	9 (0.39%)	11 (0.50%)	28 (1.28%)
Pacific Islander alone (NH)	—	—	0 (0.00%)	0 (0.00%)	1 (0.05%)
Other race alone (NH)	0 (0.00%)	0 (0.00%)	1 (0.04%)	1 (0.05%)	9 (0.41%)
Mixed race or multiracial (NH)	—	—	21 (0.90%)	47 (2.13%)	139 (6.34%)
Hispanic or Latino (any race)	0 (0.00%)	6 (0.23%)	23 (0.98%)	30 (1.36%)	81 (3.69%)
Total	2,829 (100.00%)	2,598 (100.00%)	2,336 (100.00%)	2,211 (100.00%)	2,194 (100.00%)

=== 2020 census ===
As of the 2020 census, there were 2,194 people, 938 households, and 503 families residing in the city.. The population density was 1,667.17 inhabitants per square mile (643.7/km^{2}). There were 1,113 housing units at an average density of 845.74 per square mile (326.5/km^{2}). The racial makeup of the city was 83.23% White, 1.28% African American, 6.56% Native American, 1.28% Asian, 0.05% Pacific Islander, 0.68% from some other races and 6.93% from two or more races. Hispanic or Latino people of any race were 3.69% of the population.

There were 938 households out of which 26.2% had children under the age of 18 living with them, 39.8% were married couples living together, 33.2% had a female householder with no husband present, and _% were non-families. 41.9% of all households were made up of individuals and 22.7% had someone living alone who was 65 years of age or older. The average household size was 2._ and the average family size was 2._.

In the city the population was spread out with _% were under 5 years of age, 21.9% under the age of 18, _% from 18 to 24, _% from 25 to 44, _% from 45 to 64, and 24.7% who were 65 years of age or older. The median age was 39.6 years. For every 100 females there were 93.3 males. For every 100 females age 18 and over, there were 87.2 males.

The median income for a household in the city was $_, and the median income for a family was $_. Males had a median income of $_ versus $_ for females. The per capita income for the city was $_. _% of the population and _% of families were below the poverty line. Out of the total people living in poverty, _% were under the age of 18 and _% were 65 or older.

0.0% of residents lived in urban areas, while 100.0% lived in rural areas.

20.0% were households with a male householder and no spouse or partner present.

There were 1,113 housing units, of which 15.7% were vacant. The homeowner vacancy rate was 6.2% and the rental vacancy rate was 13.1%.

=== 2010 census ===
As of the 2010 census, there were 2,211 people, 972 households, and 538 families residing in the city. The population density was 2,026.58 inhabitants per square mile (782.5/km^{2}). There were 1,085 housing units at an average density of 994.50 per square mile (384.0/km^{2}). The racial makeup of the city was 92.36% White, 0.68% African American, 4.12% Native American, 0.50% Asian, 0.00% Pacific Islander, 0.18% from some other races and 2.17% from two or more races. Hispanic or Latino people of any race were 1.36% of the population.

There were 972 households, of which 23.3% had children under the age of 18 living with them, 43.5% were married couples living together, 8.8% had a female householder with no husband present, 3.0% had a male householder with no wife present, and 44.7% were non-families. 41.0% of all households were made up of individuals, and 21.7% had someone living alone who was 65 years of age or older. The average household size was 2.02 and the average family size was 2.71.

The median age in the city was 44.9 years. 18.1% of residents were under the age of 18; 13.5% were between the ages of 18 and 24; 18.4% were from 25 to 44; 25.1% were from 45 to 64; and 24.7% were 65 years of age or older. The gender makeup of the city was 48.8% male and 51.2% female.

=== 2000 census ===
As of the 2000 census, there were 2,336 people, 979 households, and 550 families residing in the city. The population density was 2,230.0 inhabitants per square mile (861.0/km^{2}). There were 1,114 housing units at an average density of 1,063.4 per square mile (410.6/km^{2}). The racial makeup of the city was 95.25% White, 0.34% African American, 2.87% Native American, 0.39% Asian, 0.09% from some other races and 1.07% from two or more races. Hispanic or Latino people of any race were 0.98% of the population.

There were 979 households, out of which 24.4% had children under the age of 18 living with them, 47.6% were married couples living together, 6.4% had a female householder with no husband present, and 43.8% were non-families. 41.5% of all households were made up of individuals, and 24.2% had someone living alone who was 65 years of age or older. The average household size was 2.10 and the average family size was 2.86.

In the city, the population was spread out, with 19.0% under the age of 18, 14.2% from 18 to 24, 18.9% from 25 to 44, 20.8% from 45 to 64, and 27.2% who were 65 years of age or older. The median age was 43 years. For every 100 females, there were 87.6 males. For every 100 females age 18 and over, there were 85.0 males.

The median income for a household in the city was $29,022, and the median income for a family was $40,938. Males had a median income of $29,286 versus $20,089 for females. The per capita income for the city was $16,530. About 5.4% of families and 10.9% of the population were below the poverty line, including 16.0% of those under age 18 and 9.1% of those age 65 or over.

== Education ==
=== K–12 ===
Bottineau Public Schools, the local school district, operates one elementary school, one middle school, and one high school.

=== Higher education ===
- Dakota College at Bottineau

== Media ==
- Newspapers

The Bottineau Courant is a weekly publication.

- Radio

KBTO Sunny 101.9 is a local FM station offering local weather, sports, advertisement and country music. A few other stations are available from nearby Manitoba such as BOUNCE 96.1 which is an "80's 90's, and 00’s" mix station from Brandon, MB, Canada.

== Notable people ==
- Duane Klueh, basketball player and coach; head coach for Indiana State men's basketball team
- Ryan Kraft, left wing hockey player with the German Kassel Huskies
- Gregory R. Page, president and CEO of Cargill Inc.
- Ronald Paulson, English professor, expert on William Hogarth works
- Neal Peterson, musician
- Tom Rapp, leader of the band Pearls Before Swine
