= Lake Metigoshe =

Lake split between Canada and the United States

- Metigoshe Lake
- Location within North Dakota Location within the United States
- Location: Bottineau County, North Dakota, and Rural Municipality of Winchester, Manitoba
- Coordinates: 48.979°N 100.354°W
- Basin countries: United States, Canada
- Surface area: 1,544 acres (625 ha)
- Max. depth: 24 feet (7.3 m)
- Surface elevation: 2,139 feet (652 m)
- Settlements: Roland Township

Lake Metigoshe is a 1,544-acre (625 ha) lake in both Bottineau County, North Dakota and the Rural Municipality of Winchester, Manitoba. It is located in the Turtle Mountains on the Canada–United States border and has a maximum depth of 24 feet (7.3 m). The majority of the lake is within the United States, but two bays along the north shore extend over the international border into Canada. When the lake was first discovered by white settlers, it was called Fish Lake, and this name appears on an early plat map of Roland Township. The present name was adopted after learning that the Native Americans / First Nations people in the area referred to the lake as 'metigoshe washegum' (referring to the lake being surrounded by forest). The original name lives on in one of the bays attached to the Canadian portion of the lake (Little Fish Lake). The eastern portion of one of the Canadian bays has an official landing where one can disembark and call customs for an inspection. The Lake Metigoshe State Park encompasses about of a quarter of the lake's overall shoreline (or the east half of what is locally known as 'North Lake'). It offers swimming, canoeing, sailing, waterskiing and other water sports, modern and primitive camping areas, and picnicking. A group of waterskiing enthusiasts established the Club de Skinautiques waterskiing club in the 1950s and puts on a couple shows a year in front of a prominent hillside along the south part of the lake.

== See also ==
- List of lakes of North Dakota
