= North Dakota Parks and Recreation Department =

Agency overview
- Headquarters: 604 E Boulevard Ave, Dept 750 Bismarck, North Dakota 58505
- Agency executives: Cody Schulz, Director; Paul Taylor, Deputy Director
- Website: http://www.parkrec.nd.gov/index.html

The North Dakota Parks and Recreation Department is the state agency that administers selected state parks and recreation areas for the state of North Dakota.

== History ==
In 1965, the North Dakota Legislative Assembly established the North Dakota Park Service, along with the State Outdoor Recreation Agency to assist the Park Service with planning park improvements. In 1977, the agencies were merged and renamed the North Dakota Parks and Recreation Department.

The agency manages thirteen state parks, seven state recreation areas, seven nature preserves, state trails, and outdoor education statewide. In addition, the agency is tasked with off-highway vehicle planning and safety, snowmobile safety and trails, outdoor recreation grants and statewide recreation planning, and the state's scenic byways program.

== See also ==
- List of North Dakota state parks
- North Dakota Game and Fish Department
