= Totten =

Totten may refer to:

== Places ==
- Totten (mountain), a mountain in Hemsedal, Norway
- Fort Totten (disambiguation)
- Totten Glacier, Antarctica
- Totten Inlet, Puget Sound, Washington, United States
- Totten Key, island in the Florida Keys, United States
- Totten Prairie, Illinois, United States

== People ==
- Alex Totten (born 1946), Scottish football player and manager
- Archibald W. O. Totten (1809–1867), Justice of the Tennessee Supreme Court
- Charles Adelle Lewis Totten, (1851–1908), American military officer, and influential early advocate of British Israelism
- Donald L. Totten (1933–2019), American politician and mechanical engineer
- George A. Totten Sr. (1870–1955), American minister, newspaper publisher, and politician
- George Muirson Totten (1809–1884), American civil engineer
- George Oakley Totten Jr. (1866–1939), American architect
- Henry Totten (1824–1899), American politician and businessman
- Henry Roland Totten (1892–1975), American botanist
- James Totten (1818–1871), officer in the Union Army and Missouri militia general during the American Civil War and was the Assistant Inspector General
- Joseph Gilbert Totten (1788–1864), cofounder of the National Academy of Sciences
- Michael Totten (born 1970), American writer
- Robert J. Totten (1937–1995), American television director
- Samuel Totten, American genocide scholar and activist, Professor Emeritus, University of Arkansas
- Scott Totten, American musician
- Silas Totten (1804–1873), American academic and college president
- Willie Totten (born 1962), head coach of the Mississippi Valley State University football team
- Anthony Totten (born 1969), Australian former professional rugby league footballer

== Other ==
- Totten trust
- Totten (Japanese: トッテン), the Japanese name for the Super Mario series character Nabbit.

== See also ==
- Tottenham (disambiguation)
- Tottenville, Staten Island
