= Tottenham (disambiguation) =

Tottenham is a suburb of London, England

Tottenham may also refer to:

== Places ==
=== United Kingdom ===
- Municipal Borough of Tottenham, a former administrative district in England
- Tottenham (UK Parliament constituency), in London, England
- Tottenham Green (ward), a former electoral ward in London
- Tottenham Hale, a district of North London
- Tottenham House, Wiltshire, England

=== Australia ===
- Tottenham, New South Wales, a small town in Australia
- Tottenham, Victoria, a suburb of Melbourne, Australia
  - Tottenham railway station

=== Elsewhere ===
- Tottenham, Ontario, a small town in Canada

== Sports ==
- Tottenham Hotspur F.C., an association football club in London
  - Tottenham Hotspur (Superleague Formula team), the club's former moto racing team
  - Tottenham Hotspur F.C. Women, the club's women's team

== People ==
- Alexander Tottenham (1873–1946), a British civil servant and administrator in India
- Ann Tottenham (born 1940), a Canadian retired Anglican bishop
- Charles Tottenham, a name given to several people
- Nim Tottenham, an American professor of psychology
- Richard Tottenham, a name given to several people

== Other uses ==
- Tottenham (1802 Indiaman), a merchant ship
- SS Tottenham, five British steamships in service between 1896 and 1941
