= SS Tottenham =

Five steamships have borne the name Tottenham, after Tottenham in the United Kingdom:

- SS Tottenham (1896) was a 2,137-ton cargo ship launched as Dacia on 12 February 1896, by Richardson Duck of Thornaby. Had the name Tottenham from 1897 to 1899, then renamed Saltillo in 1899 and Lalen-Mendi in 1909. Torpedoed and sunk by a submarine south of Beachy Head on 17 November 1917.
- SS Tottenham (1901) was a 4,494-ton cargo ship launched on 18 February 1901, by Ramsay of Stockton. Renamed Brinkburn in 1904 and renamed back to Tottenham again the same year. Wrecked off Juan de Nova Island on 2 February 1911.
- SS Tottenham (1906 West Hartlepool) was a 3,106-ton cargo ship launched as Harewood on 12 February 1906, by Gray in West Hartlepool. Renamed Tottenham in 1912. Torpedoed and sunk on 4 August 1916 by SM U-35 south-west of Planier Island, France.
- SS Tottenham (1906 North Sands) was a 3,655-ton cargo ship launched as Don Cesar on 27 April 1906, by Thompson, J.L. in North Sands. Renamed Apsley in 1919, Tottenham in 1925. Everonika in 1930 and Irma in 1941. Wrecked as the German Irma on 13 March 1944, at "Vetterbae" near Trondheim, Norway.
- SS Tottenham (1940) was a 4,762-ton cargo ship launched on 21 March 1940, by Caledon SB & E Co in Dundee. Scuttled by the German raider Atlantis on 17 June 1941.
