= Fort Totten (Queens) =

Military installation in Queens, New York

- Part of Coast Defenses of Eastern New York
- New York City borough of Queens, New York
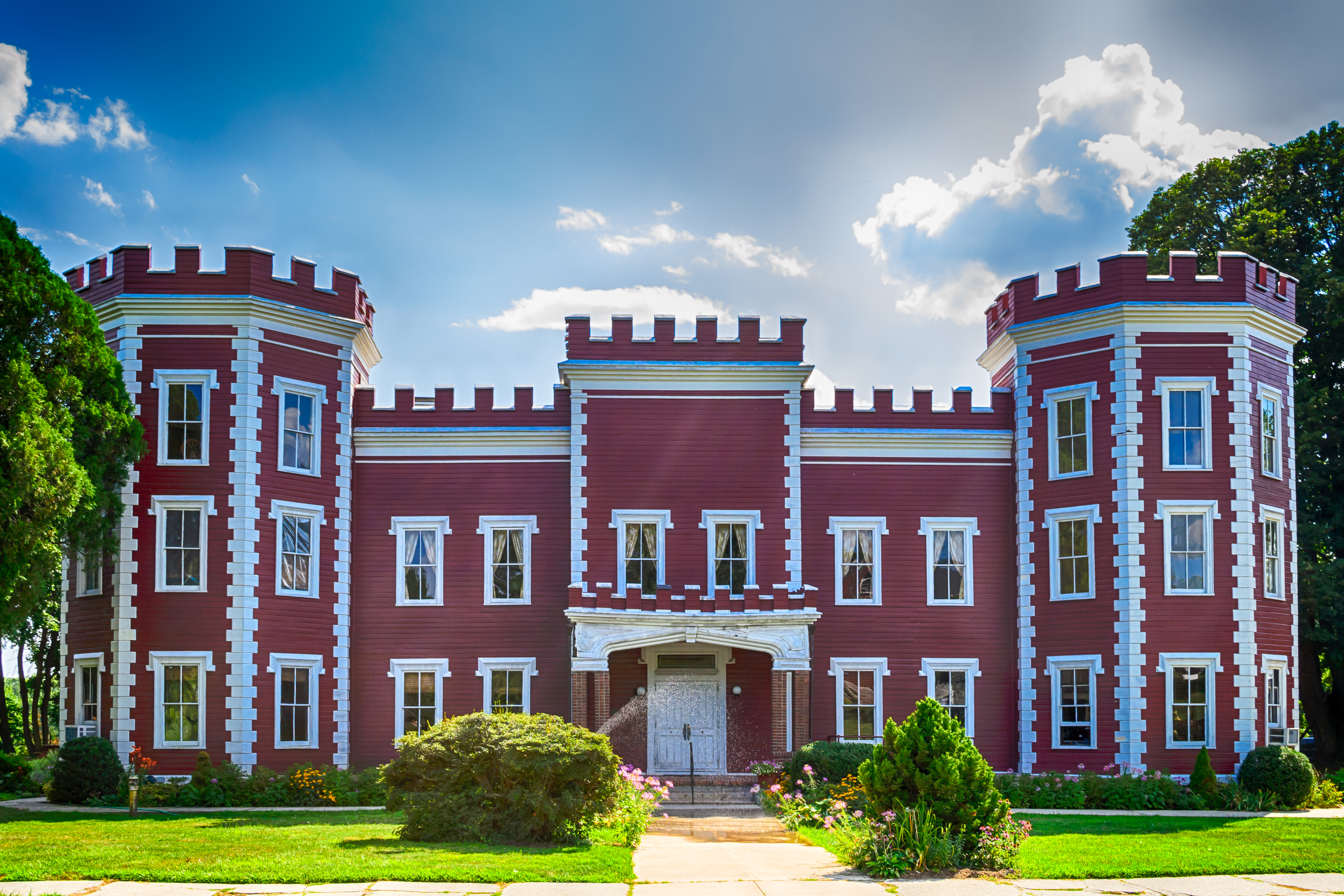
- The former Fort Totten Officer's Club

Site information
- Owner: New York City Department of Parks and Recreation (primarily)
- Open to the public: Civil War fort, some other activities

Location
- Location within New York City Location within New York Location within the United States
- Coordinates: 40°47′31.3″N 73°46′33.9″W

Site history
- Built: 1862; 164 years ago
- Built by: United States Army Corps of Engineers
- In use: 1862–1974 (US Army); 1974–present (Army Reserve)
- Materials: granite
- Fate: Active use by U.S. Army Reserve. Portions converted for use as public park. Other portions converted for use by the NYPD and FDNY.

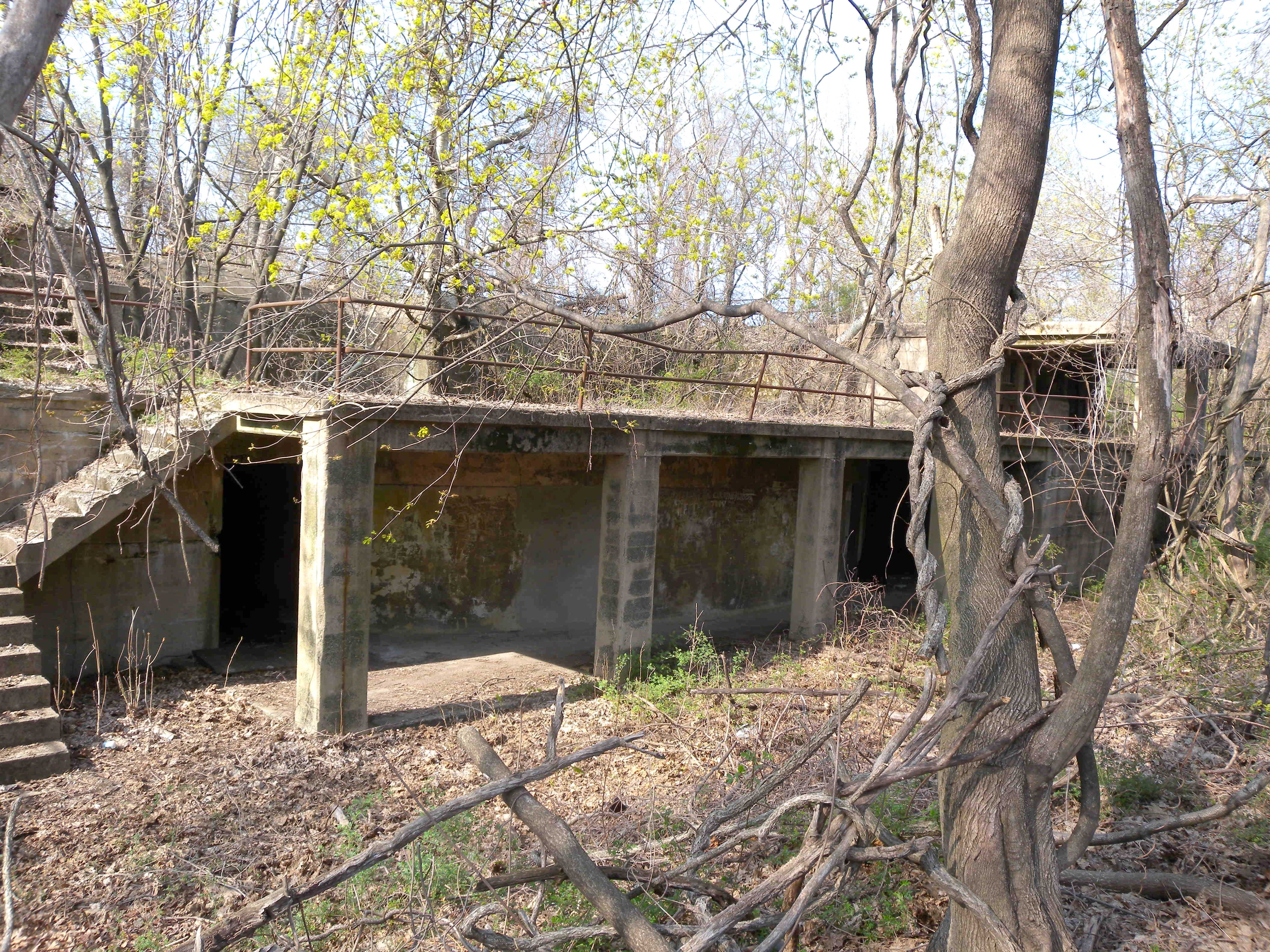
Abandoned fortification (Endicott era batteries)

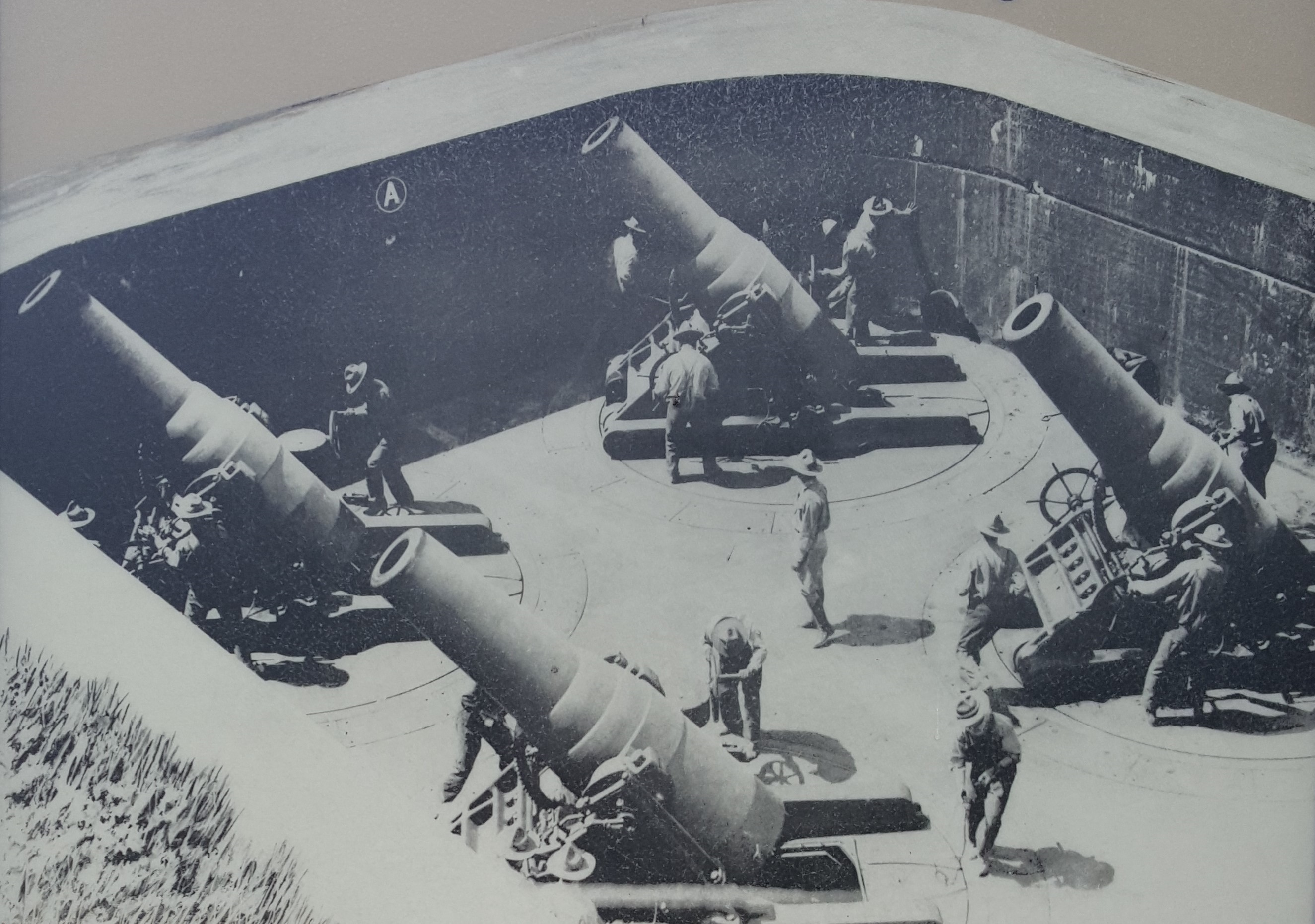
12-inch mortars in a pit; four of these pits in a square were the "Abbot Quad" arrangement

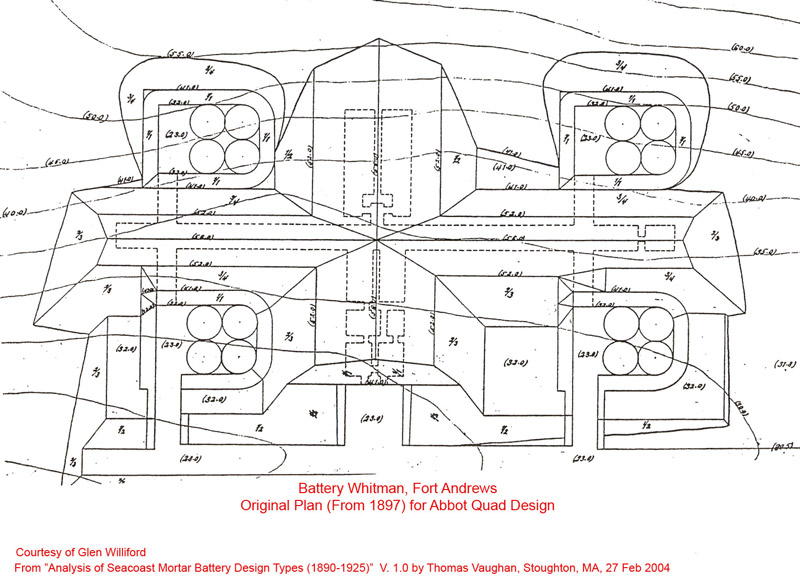
Typical "Abbot Quad" arrangement, Battery Whitman initial design, Fort Andrews, Boston, MA

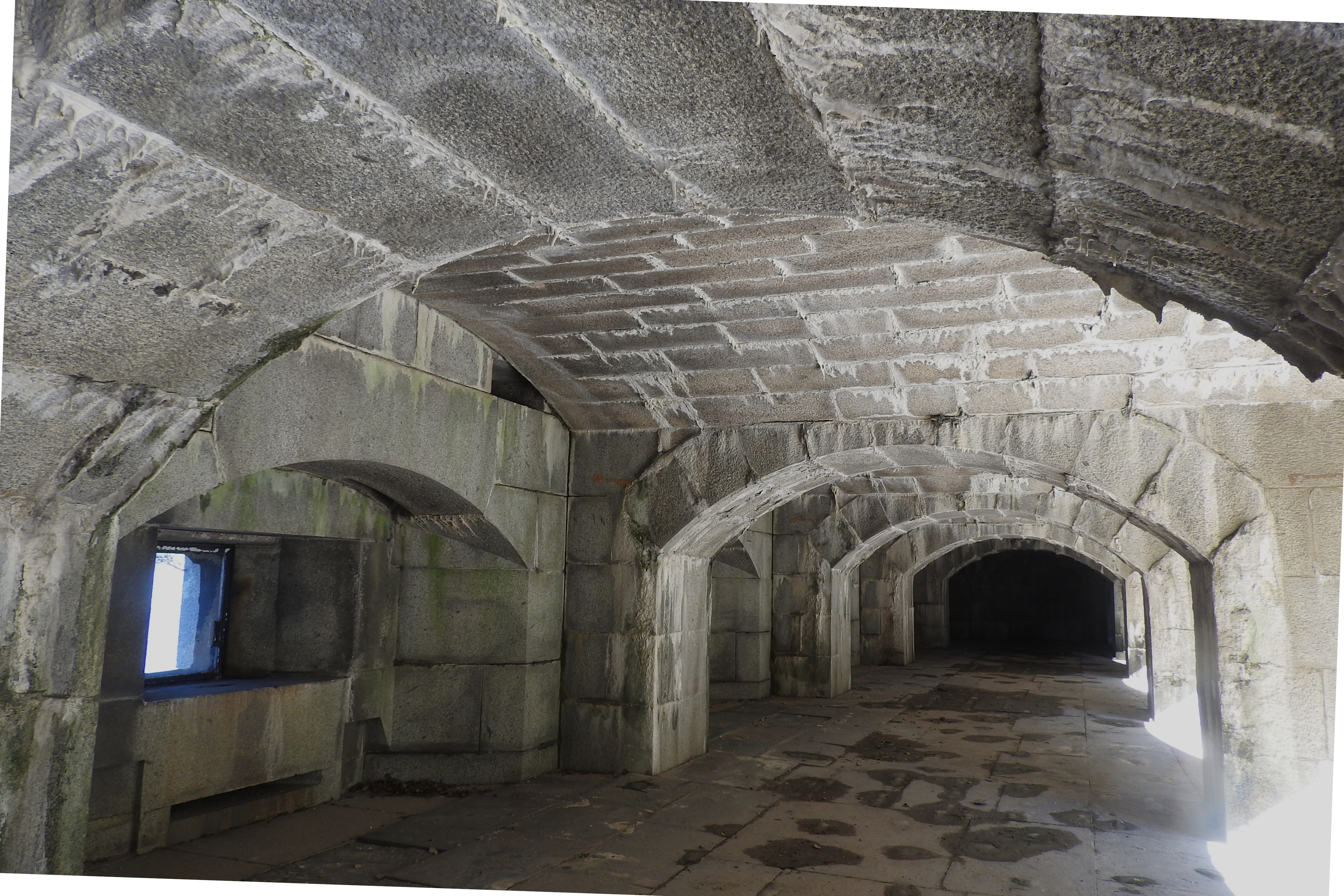
Where the guns were to be installed according to Lee's design

Fort Totten is a former active United States Army installation in the New York City borough of Queens. It is located on the north shore of Long Island. Fort Totten is at the head of Little Neck Bay, where the East River widens to become Long Island Sound. While the U.S. Army Reserve continues to maintain a presence at the fort, the property is now owned by the City of New York.

== History ==
=== Civil War era ===
Construction began on the Fort at Willets Point in 1862 (named Fort Totten in 1898), after the land was purchased by the U.S. Government in 1857 from the Willets family. The fort is close to the Queens neighborhoods of Bay Terrace, Bayside, Beechhurst and Whitestone. The original purpose was to defend the East River approach to New York Harbor, combined with the preceding Fort Schuyler, which faces it from Throggs Neck in the Bronx on the opposite side of the river entrance. The fort was among several forts of the third system of seacoast defense in the United States begun in the first year of the Civil War. The initial design was drawn up by Robert E. Lee in 1857 and modified during construction by Chief Engineer Joseph G. Totten. Unusually, it was designed with four tiers of cannon facing the water totaling 68 guns. In the United States, only Castle Williams on Governors Island, Fort Wadsworth on Staten Island, and Fort Point in San Francisco shared this feature. However, construction was abandoned after the war, as masonry forts were considered obsolete following severe damage to some in the American Civil War. Only one tier and part of a second tier of the two seacoast walls was completed; the three landward walls received little work. From 1861 to 1898 the fort area was known as Camp Morgan, named for New York Governor Edwin D. Morgan.

=== 1869–1890 ===
In 1869 the Engineer School of Application was established at the future Fort Totten, remaining there until 1901. One of its first missions was the development of underwater minefields, which with some modernization would remain an important coast defense element through World War II. Major Henry Larcom Abbot, the first commander of the school, was instrumental in developing these. Two earthwork batteries were built in the 1870s; the first was a battery of 27 guns as part of a short-lived fort improvement program, while the second was a battery of 16 mortars. The latter was the prototype for the "Abbot Quad" arrangement, developed by Major Abbot and used for the first 12-inch coast defense mortar deployments in the 1890s. In 1871 a tunnel was built connecting the upper 27-gun battery with the incomplete fort. In 1890 the Engineer School experimented with the Sims torpedo, an electric self-propelled torpedo partly designed by Thomas Edison.

=== Endicott era (1890–1916) ===
In 1885 the Endicott Board made sweeping recommendations for new coast defenses, and among them was upgrading Fort Totten. The fort was named in 1898 after former Chief of Engineers Major General Joseph Gilbert Totten, the premier American designer of forts in the early 19th Century, and new gun batteries were built 1897–1904 as part of the Coast Defenses of Eastern New York as follows:

Name	No. of guns	Gun type	Carriage type	Years active
King	8	12" mortar M1890	barbette M1896	1900–1935
Mahan	2	12-inch gun M1895	disappearing M1897	1900–1918
Graham	2	10-inch gun M1888	disappearing M1894	1897–1918
Sumner	2	8-inch gun M1888	1 disappearing M1894, 1 disappearing M1896	1899–1917
Stuart	2	5-inch gun M1897	balanced pillar M1896	1900–1917
Baker	4	2 3-inch gun M1898, 2 3-inch gun M1902	2 masking parapet M1898, 2 pedestal M1902	1900–1920 (M1898), 1904–1945 (M1902)
Burnes	2	3-inch gun M1902	pedestal M1902	1904–1945

Battery King was built by converting two of the four pits of the earlier mortar battery to concrete, with four mortars in each pit. A mine casemate, part of a controlled underwater minefield, was also built circa 1900, replacing an experimental 1876 casemate. Unusually, the Coast Defenses of Eastern New York were soon superseded by the concurrently-built Coast Defenses of Long Island Sound, with most of the guns of the former removed in World War I, and almost all of Fort Totten (except the 3-inch guns) disarmed by 1935. In 1901 the Engineer School was transferred to Washington, DC, and the emerging United States Army Coast Artillery Corps took over the further development of coast defenses.

=== World War I ===
After the American entry into World War I a number of changes took place at most stateside coast defense forts. With the threat from German surface ships unlikely, they became more important as mobilization and training centers. Their garrisons were reduced to provide trained heavy artillery crews for the Western Front, and many of their weapons were removed with a view to getting them into the fight eventually. The Coast Artillery operated almost all US heavy and railway artillery in that war, primarily weapons purchased from the French and British. Fort Totten's 5-inch, 8-inch, 10-inch, and 12-inch batteries were dismounted in 1917–1918 as potential railway or, in the case of the 5-inchers, field artillery. Battery Mahan's two 12-inch guns and Battery Sumner's pair of 8-inch guns were transferred to the railway artillery program. Battery Graham's pair of 10-inch guns were transferred to Fort Hamilton in 1919, probably to replace similar guns there. Battery Stuart's 5-inch guns were mounted on field carriages and sent to France. However, a history of the 5-inch regiment in France indicates that they never received ammunition and did not complete training before the Armistice. Another history states that only three 8-inch guns arrived in France of the US Army's World War I railway artillery program; most railway guns were not completed until after the Armistice.

=== Between the wars ===
In 1920 Battery Baker's pair of 3-inch M1898 guns was removed, part of a general removal from service of this type of weapon. Around this time a 3-gun anti-aircraft battery was built, probably armed with the 3-inch gun M1917. In 1935 Fort Totten's last heavy armament, the mortars of Battery King, were removed and the Harbor Defenses of Eastern New York effectively inactivated, although a minefield possibly remained in reserve and the command remained in service until mid-1942. This left Fort Totten with four 3-inch guns that served through World War II, probably to guard the potential minefield.

=== World War II ===
In December 1941 Fort Totten became the headquarters for the anti-aircraft portion of the Eastern Defense Command, organizing anti-aircraft defenses for the entire east coast. On May 9, 1942 the Harbor Defenses of Eastern New York was inactivated and consolidated into the Harbor Defenses of New York; HD Eastern New York eventually disbanded on May 22, 1944.

=== Cold War ===
In 1954, the fort became a Project Nike air defense site. Although no Nike missiles were located at Fort Totten, it was the regional headquarters for the New York area; administrative offices and personnel housing were located at the fort. By 1966 the fort was home to the headquarters of the 1st Region, Army Air Defense Command. Fort Totten was also headquarters for the 66th Anti-Aircraft Missile Battalion and the 41st AAA Gun Battalion. The 66th Anti-Aircraft Missile Battalion's missiles were placed at nearby Hart Island, with the radars at Fort Slocum on Davids Island. The 90 mm gun batteries of the 41st were located throughout Long Island.

=== 1970s ===
According to rumor, Fort Totten was the location of the safe house where Joe Valachi, the Genovese family mob turncoat and subject of a book called "The Valachi Papers", was hidden in 1970; he was later sent to a Federal prison in Texas where he died the following year. In 1974, as part of defense budget reductions following the end of the Vietnam War, and due to the disestablishment of the Nike missile system in CONUS, Fort Totten was closed as a Regular Army installation and the remaining military presence assumed by the Army Reserve.

== Current status ==
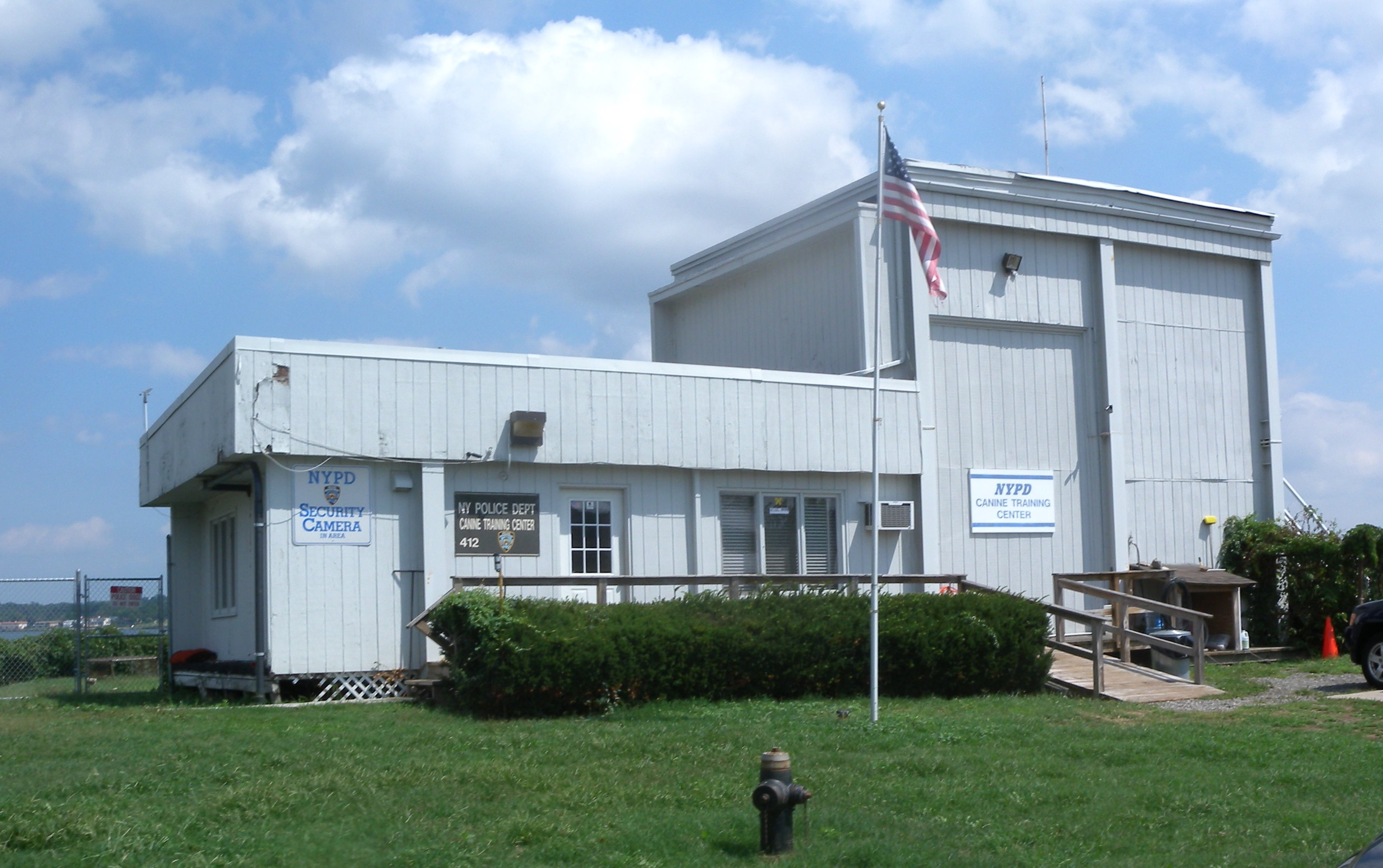
NYPD K9 training building

The current military presence at Fort Totten is centered on the 77th Sustainment Brigade, its subordinate units, and the 533rd Brigade Support Battalion of the U.S. Army Reserve.

Much of the fort has become a public park and is open for tours by the New York City Department of Parks & Recreation. It is accessible by the Cross Island Parkway and Clearview Expressway (I-295). The Fort Totten Visitor Center has been refurbished and houses a museum with exhibits about the history of Fort Totten. Parts are used by the New York Police Department (including the former naval minefield facilities) and the FDNY as a training center. Also, the US Coast Guard Auxiliary, Flotilla 12-1 is located here.

During the winter months, a large variety of migratory waterfowl can be observed in the surrounding waters: Little Bay to the west, Long Island Sound to the north, and Little Neck Bay to the east. Most buildings are dilapidated and unused. Fort Totten is also a sports complex, with an outdoor pool, baseball fields and three soccer fields used for youth soccer.

Fort Totten is designated as a New York City Historic District.

=== Fort Totten Officers' Club ===
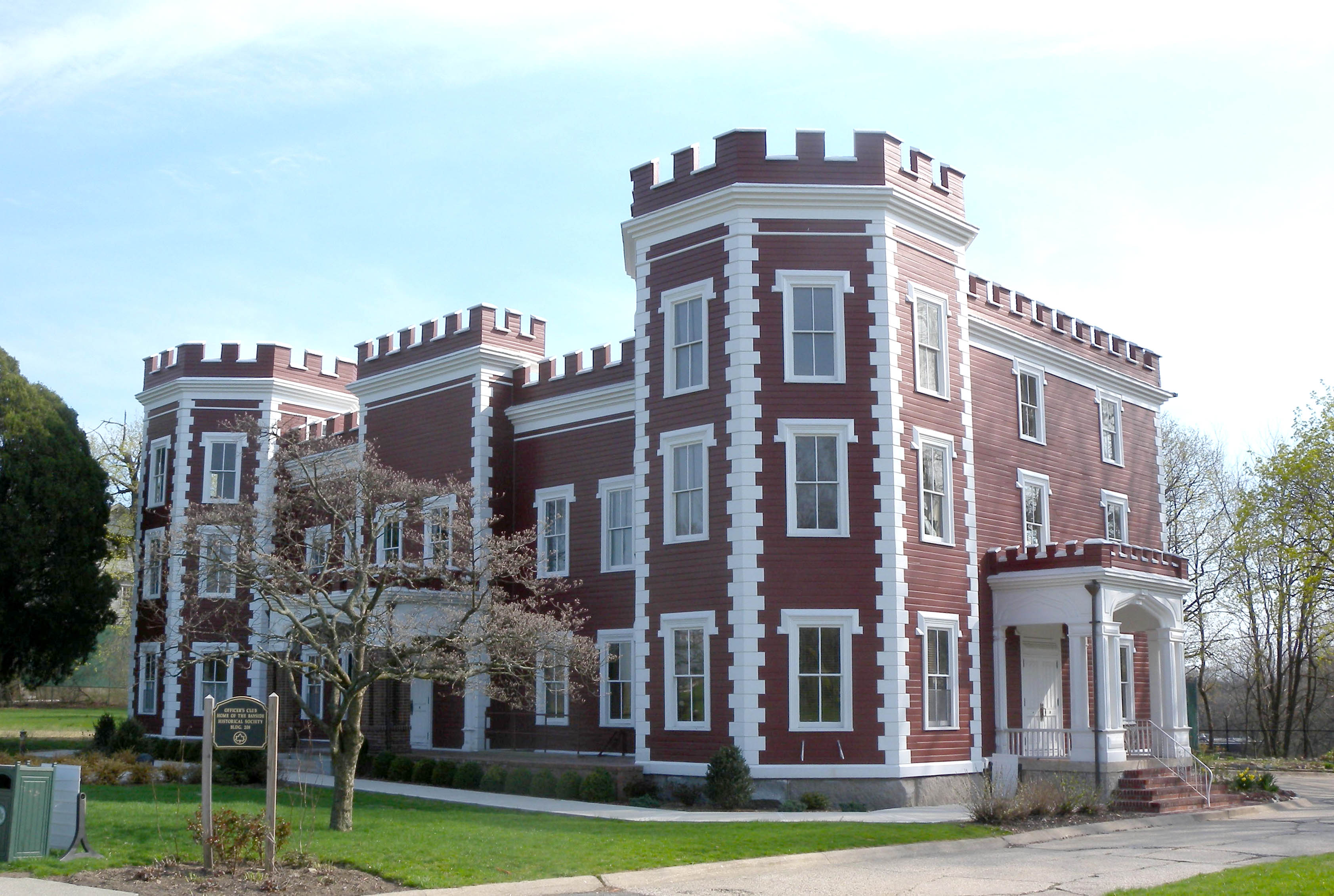
Fort Totten Officers' Club, now home of the Bayside Historical Society

The Fort Totten Officers' Club, known as "the Castle", is home to the Bayside Historical Society, which hosts events, historic exhibitions and cultural programs. It was listed on the National Register of Historic Places in 1986.

The club building was designed by Robert E. Lee in his pre-Civil War capacity as a military engineer but not built until the 1870s, although some historians believe that the actual design was done by a subordinate and merely approved by Lee. The building was designed in the neo-Gothic style popular at the time and was not created specifically for Fort Totten but rather was a generic design approved by the Army for use at military installations. Identical structures were built at other Army forts and the Castle design was adopted by the U.S. Army Corps of Engineers as their insignia, although the reason for this action is murky. A local tradition is that the Corps of Engineers symbol derived from the Fort Totten building, but the reverse is more likely: the building design was based on a castle in part because this symbol had long been identified with Army engineers. The club was built in the 1870s and the engineer castle symbol dates from circa 1840. When Fort Totten's Castle was restored in the 1990s, the Corps of Engineers was contacted in the hope that they would participate, particularly since the Fort Totten Castle was occupied at one time by the Corps of Engineers, but the military failed to show any interest.

== In popular culture ==
- In the TV series The Endgame, Fort Totten is used as a government black site, and is where criminal mastermind Elena Federova is detained upon her capture.
- The music video for Jay-Z's collaboration with Kanye West and Rihanna, "Run This Town", was filmed on August 6, 2009 at Fort Totten.
- Fort Totten appeared in the TV series White Collar, episode 13 season 5, "Diamond Exchange".
- Fort Totten appears in season 4 episode 13 of Blue Bloods (TV Series), "Unfinished Business".
- Fort Totten appears in season 5 episode 17 of Third Watch (TV Series), "Family Ties: Part II".
- Fort Totten appears in season 1 episode 1 of the TV series adaptation of Fallout, "The End".
- Fort Totten appears in season 5 episode 6 of the TV series FBI, "Double Blind".

== See also ==
- Fort Totten (disambiguation)
- Seacoast defense in the United States
- Totten (disambiguation)
- United States Army Coast Artillery Corps
