= Fort Totten Officers' Club =

Clubhouse in Queens, New York

- U.S. National Register of Historic Places
- New York City Landmark
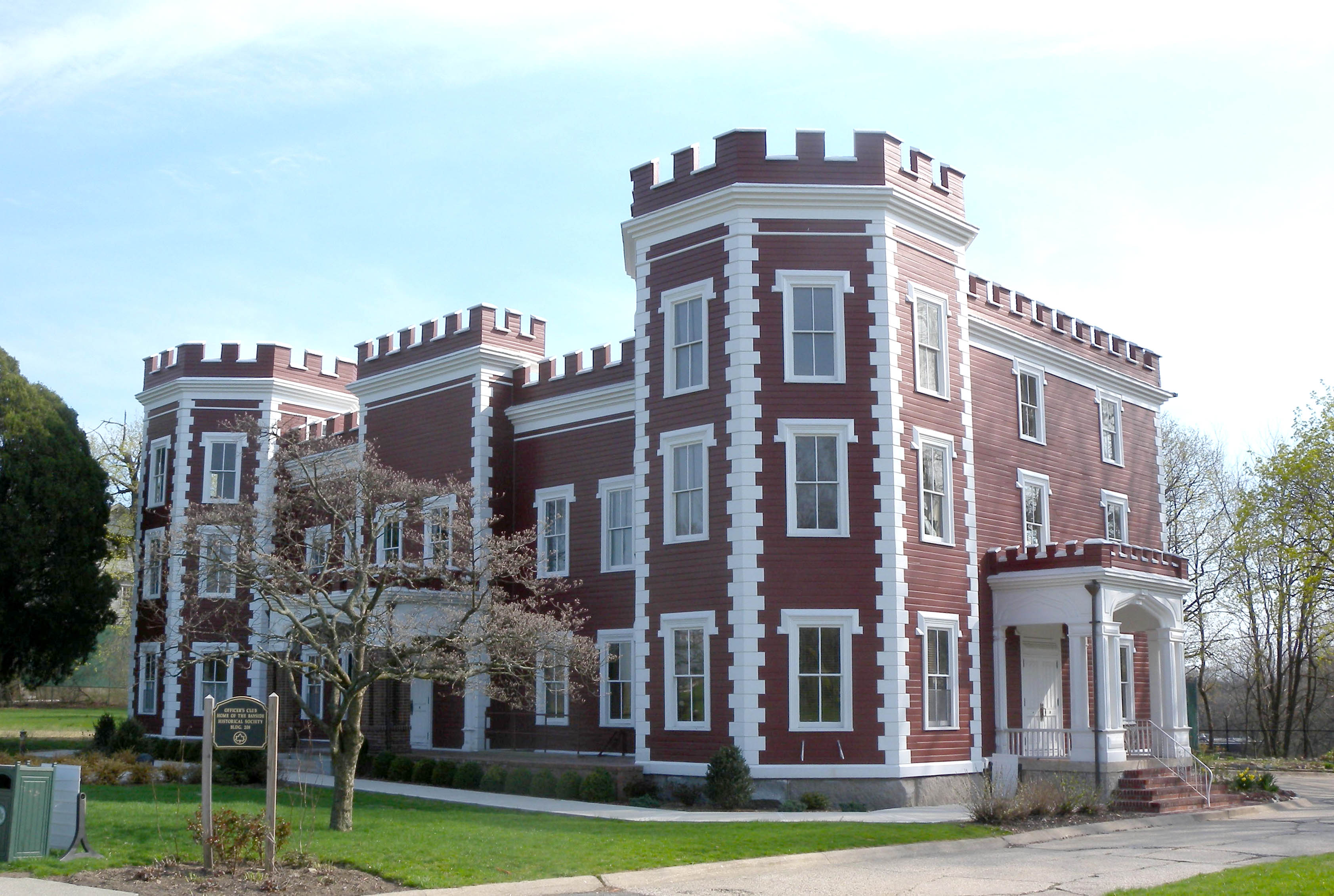
- Fort Totten Officers' Club, April 2009
- Location: Totten and Murray Aves., New York, New York
- Coordinates: 40°47′32″N 73°46′41″W
- Area: 1 acre (0.40 ha)
- Built: 1870
- Architectural style: Gothic Revival, Late Gothic Revival
- NRHP reference No.: 86000446
- NYCL No.: 0827

Significant dates
- Added to NRHP: March 17, 1986
- Designated NYCL: September 24, 1974

Fort Totten Officers' Club, also known as the Castle, is a historic clubhouse located at Fort Totten in Bayside, Queens, New York. The officers' club was built in the 1870s and expanded to its present size in 1887. It is a large Late Gothic Revival style building. It is a two-story, rectangular frame building with a projecting central tower pavilion and sheathed in clapboard. It features identical, polygonal, three story towers and a wood parapet surrounding the roofline.

It was listed on the National Register of Historic Places in 1986.

== Bayside Historical Society ==
The Castle is now home to the Bayside Historical Society, which focuses on the area's history. Exhibits include Bayside and Queens history and culture, as well as the building's history.

== See also ==
- National Register of Historic Places listings in Queens, New York
