= Juan de Nova Island =

French territory and island in the Mozambique Channel

Juan de Nova Island Île Juan de Nova (French)
- Flag of the French Southern and Antarctic Lands Coat of arms
- Motto: "Liberté, égalité, fraternité" (French) (English: "Liberty, equality, fraternity")
- Anthem: La Marseillaise ("The Marseillaise")
- Status: District of French Southern and Antarctic Lands

Juan de Nova
Disputed island
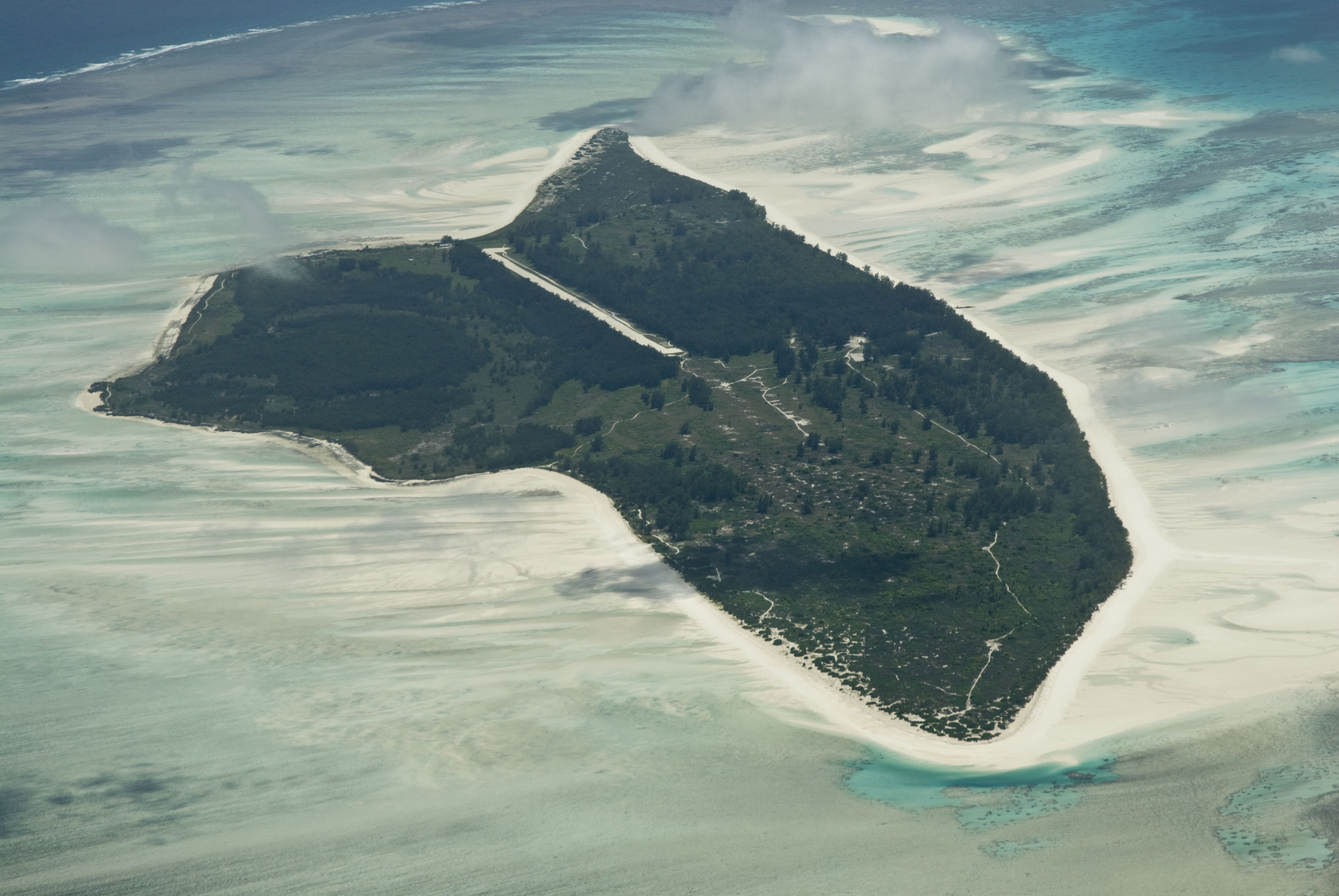

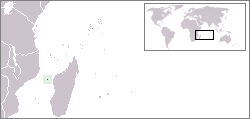
- Etymology: João da Nova

Geography
- Location: Mozambique Channel
- Coordinates: 17°03′20″S 42°43′30″E
- Area: 4.8 km^{2} (1.9 sq mi)
- Length: 6 km (3.7 mi)
- Width: 1.6 km (1 mi)
- Coastline: 12.3 km (7.64 mi)

Administration
- France
- Overseas territory: French Southern and Antarctic Lands
- District: Scattered Islands in the Indian Ocean

Claimed by
- Madagascar

Demographics
- Population: 15 (military, 2019)

Additional information
- Time zone: EAT (UTC+03:00)

Juan de Nova Island (French: Île Juan de Nova, pronounced [il ʒɥɑ̃ də nɔva]), Malagasy: Nosy Kely) is a French-controlled tropical island in the narrowest part of the Mozambique Channel, about one-third of the way between Madagascar and Mozambique. It is a low, flat island, 4.8 square kilometres (1.9 sq mi) in size.

Administratively, the island is one of the Scattered islands in the Indian Ocean, a district of the French Southern and Antarctic Lands. However, its sovereignty is disputed by Madagascar.

Anchorage is possible off the northeast of the island which also has a 1,300-metre (4,300 ft) airstrip. The island is garrisoned by French troops from Réunion and has a weather station.

== Description ==
Juan de Nova, about six kilometres (3.7 mi) long and 1.6 kilometres (1 mi) at its widest, is a nature reserve surrounded by reefs which enclose an area—not a true lagoon like in an atoll—of roughly 40 square kilometres (15 sq mi). Forests, mainly of Casuarinaceae, cover about half the island. Sea turtles nest on the beaches around the island.

== Geography ==
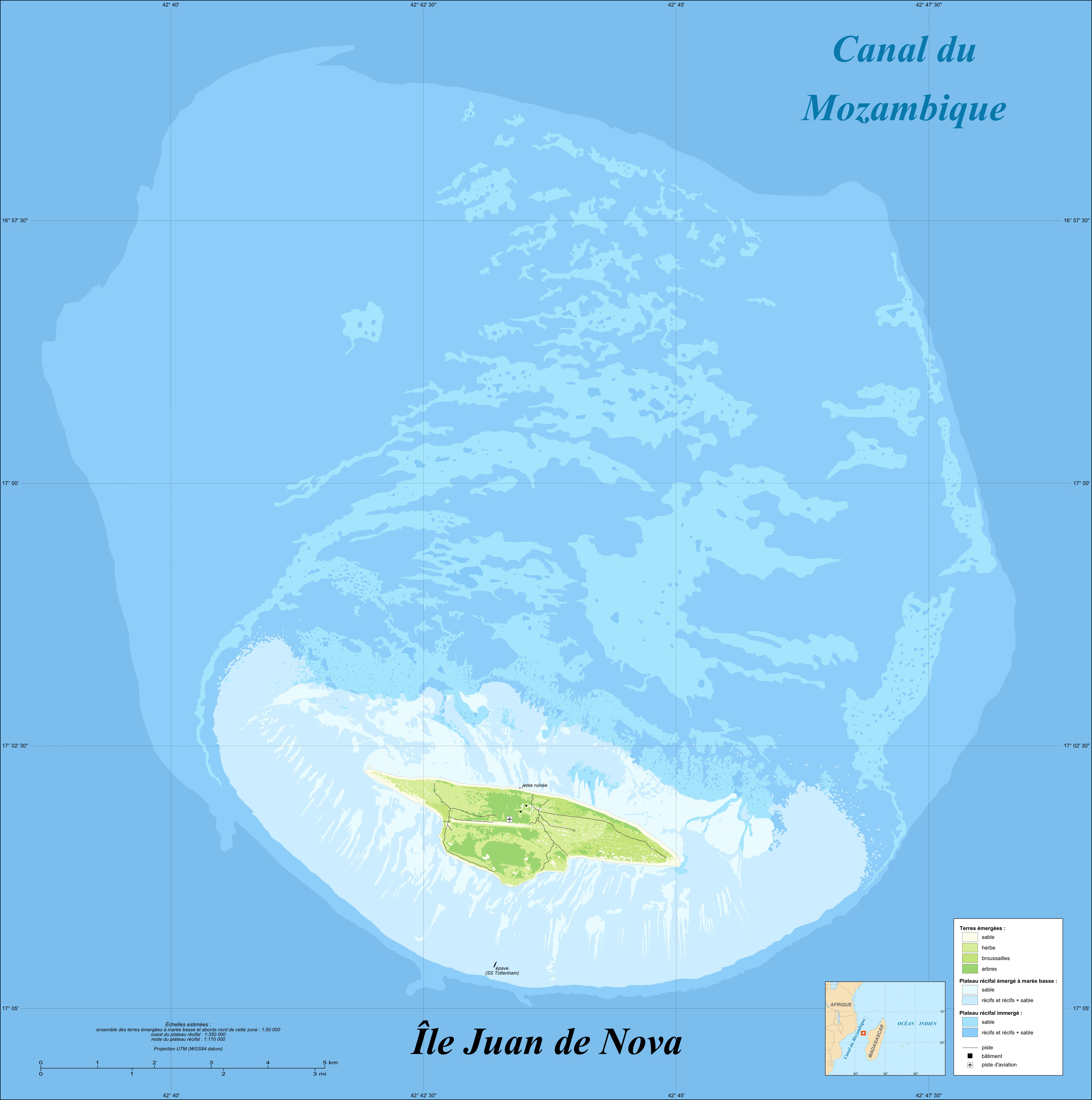
A map of Juan de Nova Island and its reefs.

Juan de Nova is located in the Mozambique Canal, closer to the Madagascar side: 140 kilometres (87 mi) from Tambohorano, 207 kilometres (129 mi) west-southwest from Tanjona Vilanandro and 288 kilometres (179 mi) from the African coast.

The island was created when an underwater promontory of a coral reef emerged when the reef was dismantled by ocean currents, producing a sandy island. The prevailing south-southwest winds form dunes on the island, which, at 10 meters (33 ft) tall, form the island's highest points.

Its southwest coast is bordered by a coral reef that prevents ships from landing, and the northeast coast consists of a lagoon that becomes sandy and impassable at low tide. There is a single pass that allows access to the island.

The difficult conditions for accessing the island has caused several shipwrecks, some of which remain on the Island, including that of the Tottenham (nicknamed the Charbonnier), which ran aground in 1911 on the island's southwest coast.

The island is about 6 kilometres (3.7 mi) long from east to west, and 1.6 kilometres (0.99 mi) wide, with an area of approximately 4.8 km^{2} (1.9 sq mi). The entire quasi-atoll is 30 kilometres (19 mi) in circumference, with an exclusive economic zone of 61,050 km^{2} (23,570 sq mi).

== History ==
=== Discovery of the island (1501) ===
Juan de Nova Island, Mozambique Channel, by Captain D. Crichton, 1751 - 25 July 1774

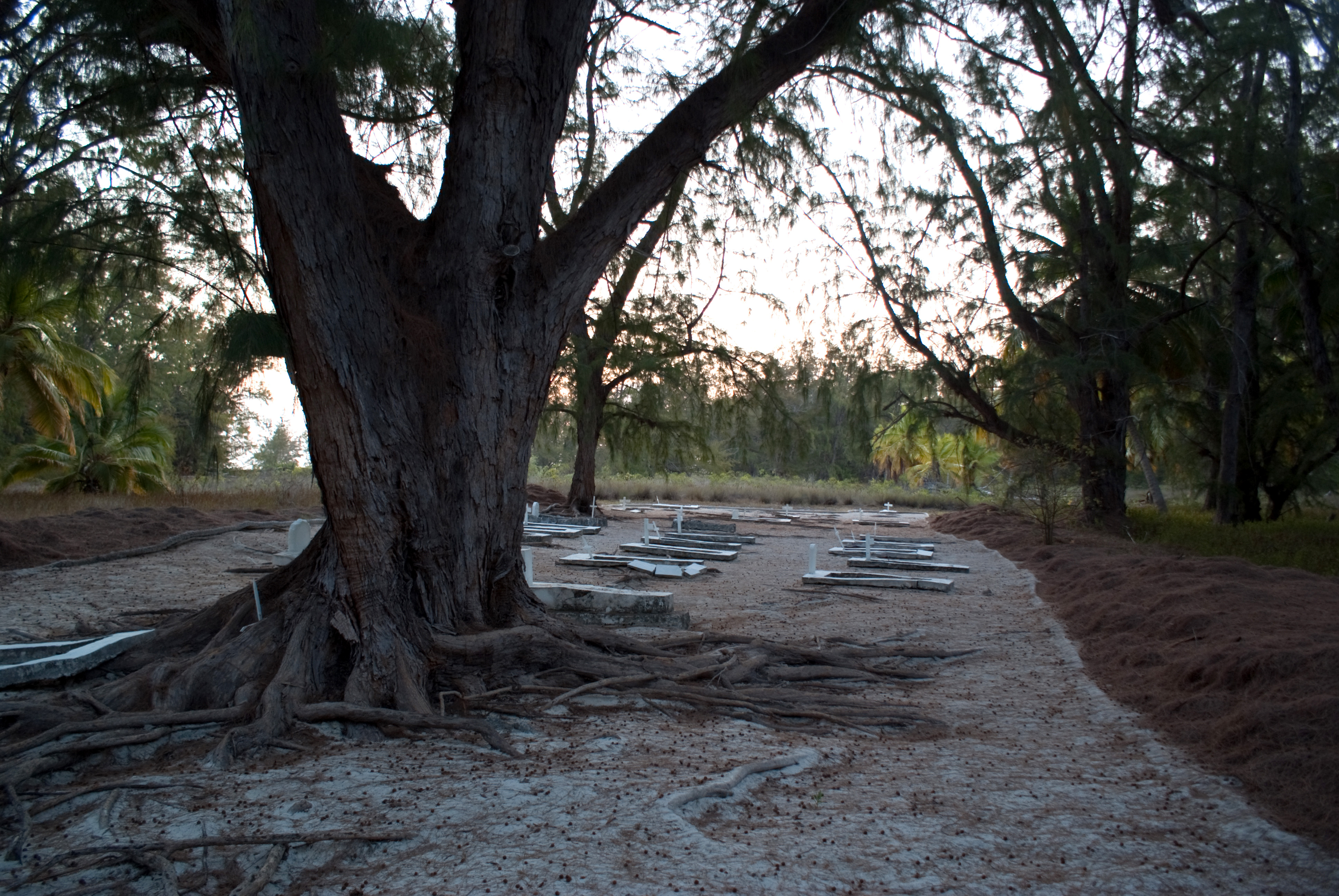
The cemetery on Juan de Nova Island.

João da Nova, a Galician admiral in the service of Portugal, came across the uninhabited island in 1501 while he was crossing the Mozambique Channel during an expedition to India. He called it Galega or Agalega (the Galician) in reference to his nationality. The island then came to be named for him, with the Spanish spelling: on subsequent maps it was labeled Johan de Nova on a map by Salvatore de Pilestrina (1519), Joa de Nova (Mercator, 1569), San-Christophoro (Ortelius, 1570), Saint-Christophe (Lislet Geoffroy), before finally being dubbed Juan de Nova by the British explorer William Fitzwilliam Owen. Historically, the island was sometimes confused with the nearby island Bassas da India, which is completely covered at high tide.

Although the island was located along the spice route, it was not of interest to the colonial powers because of its small size and little utility as a stopover. However, it is possible that it served as a refuge for pirates, such as Olivier Levasseur.

=== Acquisition by France and resource exploitation (1896–1975) ===
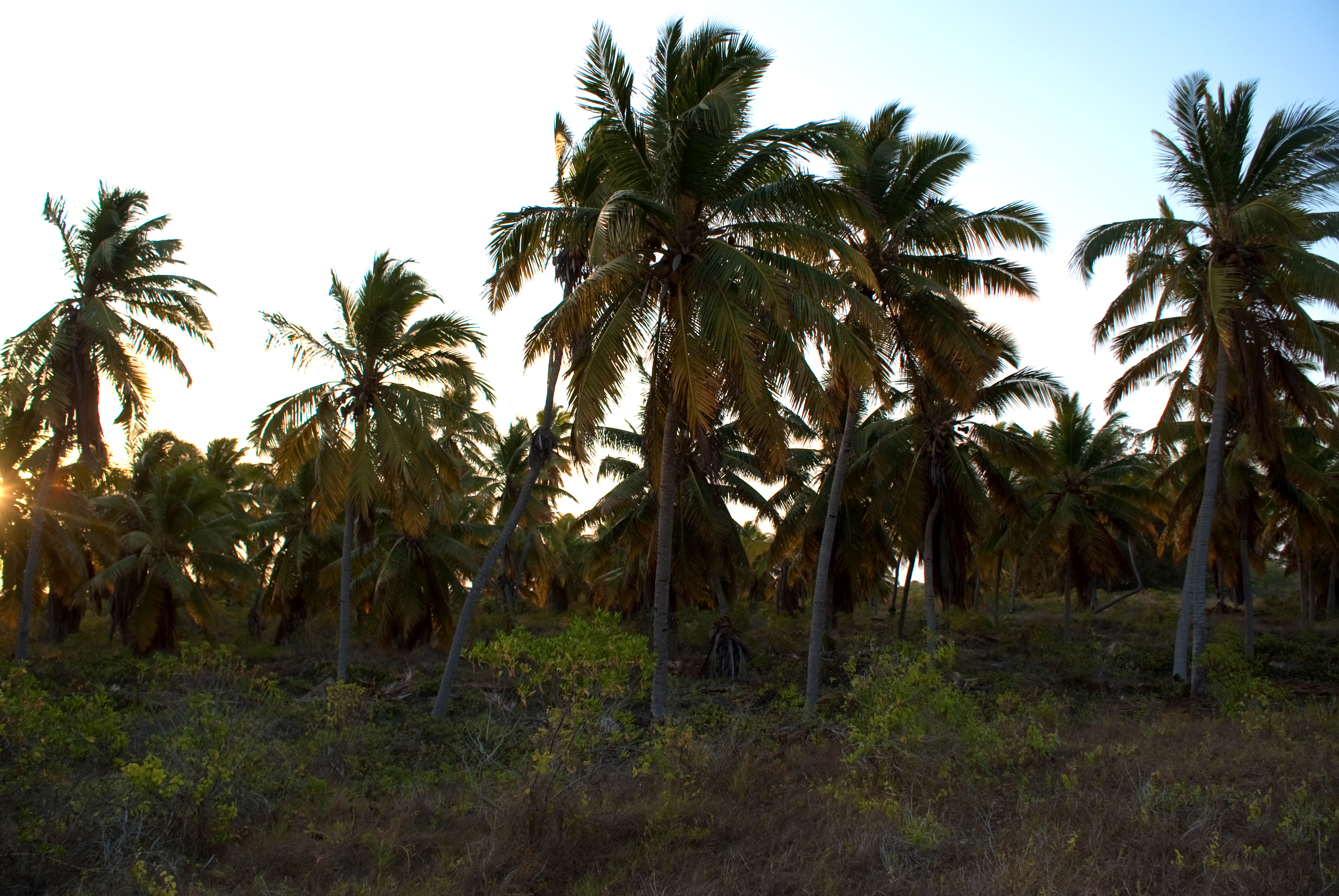
A coconut grove on Juan de Nova Island.

The island had never been inhabited when it became a possession of France, alongside Europa Island and Bassas da India, in 1897.

At the time, the only visitors to the island were Malagasy fishermen during sea turtles' nesting season. However, around 1900, the island was granted to a Frenchman for a 20-year lease. He initiated the exploitation of the island's guano deposits, which production reaching 53,000 tons in 1923. A coconut grove on the island also produced 12 tons of copra per year.

In 1921, France transferred the administration of Juan de Nova from Paris to Tananarive in its colony of Madagascar and Dependencies. Then, before the independence of Madagascar, France transferred the administration of the island to Saint-Pierre on Réunion. Madagascar became independent in 1960, and it has claimed sovereignty over the island since 1972.

An airstrip was built on the island in 1934. Guano exploitation continued for several decades, with a pause in activity during World War II. The island was abandoned during the war, and it was visited by German submariners. Installations, including a hangar, rail lines, houses and a jetty are in ruins.

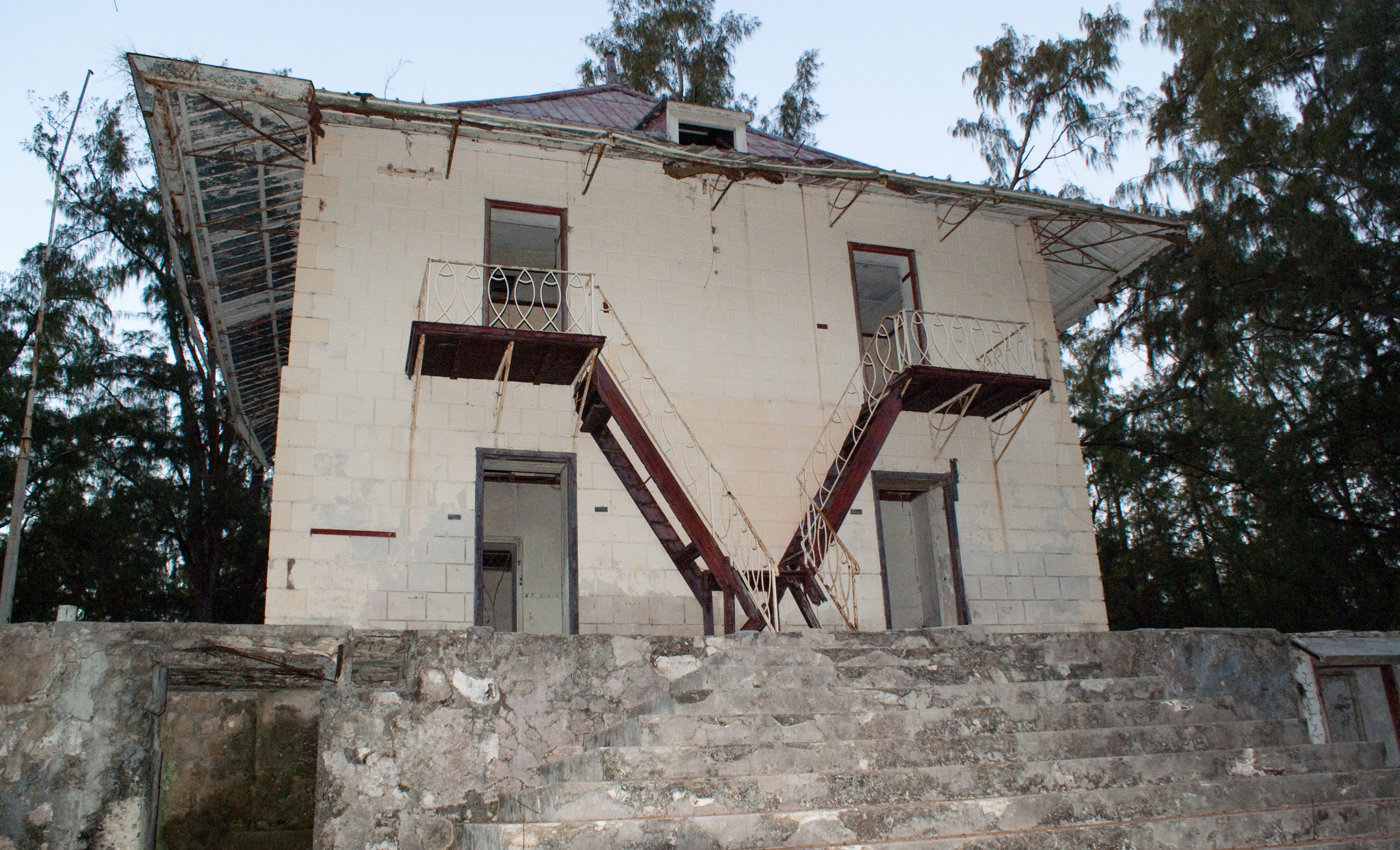
Hector Patureau's house on Juan de Nova Island.

In 1952, a second concession was granted for 15 years to the Société française des îles Malgaches (SOFIM), led by Hector Patureau. This concession was renewed for 25 years in 1960, after Madagascar's independence. Structures were built throughout the island to support the phosphate mining operation, including warehouses, housing, a prison, and a cemetery.

The workers on the island came mainly from Mauritius and the Seychelles. Working conditions were extremely harsh, with rule-breaking punished by flogging or imprisonment, and each worker had to extract one metric ton of phosphate per day to earn 3.5 rupees. In 1968, Mauritian workers revolted, and the operation's management appealed to the prefect of Réunion for help. The revolt brought government and media attention to abusive practices on the island, including droit du seigneur being practiced by one of the foremen, and some members of the staff were fired by SOFIM's president.

In the 1960s, the price of phosphate collapsed, and the mining operation on the island ceased to be profitable. SOFIM was dissolved in 1968, and the last workers left the island in 1975. The French government retook control of the concession, paying 45 million CFA to Hector Patureau in compensation.

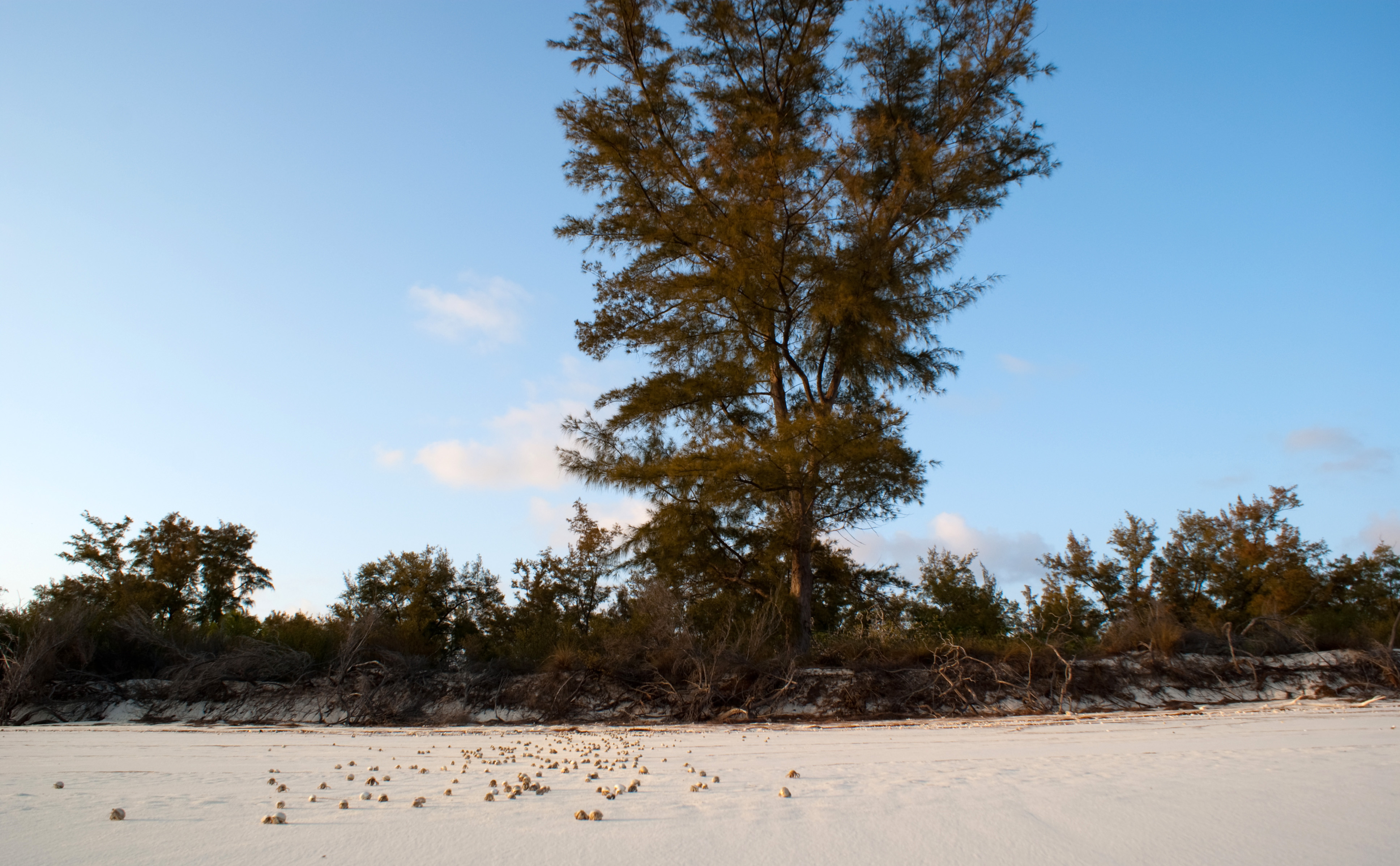
A beach on Juan de Nova Island.

=== Installation of a weather station (1971–1973) ===
In 1963, an auxiliary weather installation, called "la Goulette," was installed to carry out regular temperature and pressure readings. But on a visit to the island in 1971, a representative of the Weather Service found numerous irregularities in the readings, as well as poor security on the island, which was still under the responsibility of Patureau. Following the recommendations of the World Weather Watch, a basic, year-round weather station was built in 1973 in the southwest part of the island, at the end of the airstrip.

A project to create a Club Med tourist resort was proposed by Gilbert Trigano, which for a time brought a team of workers to the island under the supervision of Hector Patureau, but it was quickly abandoned.

=== Military presence (1974–present) ===
In 1974, the French government decided to install military detachments across the Scattered Islands in the Indian Ocean that lay within the Mozambique Channel (Juan de Nova, Europa Island, and the Glorioso Islands). Its aim was primarily to respond to Madagascar's claims to those territories, which France considers protected within an exclusive economic zone.

Juan de Nova Island was assigned a small garrison of 14 soldiers from the 2nd Marine Infantry Parachute Regiment, as well as a gendarme. They settled in housing that formerly hosted SOFIM workers. The troops receive supplies by air every 45 days.

Today, most of the installations from the mining days are in ruins, and only a few buildings are maintained for military use. Upkeep is also performed on the cemetery. The island has been converted into a nature preserve, which aims to protect biodiversity and particularly coral reefs. It is closed to access, with temporary authorization granted to scientists on short-term missions.

The Scattered Islands in the Indian Ocean are partially claimed by the Comoros, Madagascar, and Mauritius. The Malagasy and Mauritian claims, however, are significantly later than their access to independence. However, the agreement reached in October 2024 on the restitution to Mauritius of the Chagos Islands by Great Britain, in the heart of the Indian Ocean, notably home to the American base of Diego Garcia, has relaunched the debate in Madagascar.

=== Wrecks ===
The island lies on the sea route between South Africa and the northern tip of Madagascar. It is affected by strong currents and has become the site of numerous wrecks. Most visible are the remains of the SS Tottenham which ran onto the southern fringing reef in 1911.

== Economic resources ==
=== Guano ===
The presence of a significant bird population on Juan de Nova Island led to a major guano deposit on the surface of the island. This became the first natural resource to be exploited on the island in the 20th century. This mining operation led to the establishment of the first structures on the island, and the workers also planted coconut trees, whose products were also exported. The exploitation of guano stopped around 1970, after the price of phosphates dropped.

=== Hydrocarbons ===
In 2005, a government decree authorized preliminary exploration for liquid or gas hydrocarbons offshore. This authorization covers an area of approximately 62,000 square kilometers surrounding the island. In 2008, a subsequent decree granted an exploration permit for the "Juan de Nova Est" field to the companies Nighthawk Energy Plc, Jupiter Petroleum Juan de Nova Ltd, and Osceola Hydrocarbons Ltd, as well as to Marex Inc. and Roc Oil Company Ltd for the "Juan de Nova Maritime Profond" field. The licensees had to commit to investing around $100 million over five years for mining and research. The eastern boundary of these exploration areas is in contention with Madagascar and its exclusive economic zone.

In 2015, the drilling authorization was renewed Sapetro and Marex Petroleum for a period of three years.

However, these projects have been abandoned since 2019, when the island was classified as a nature reserve.

== Fauna and flora ==
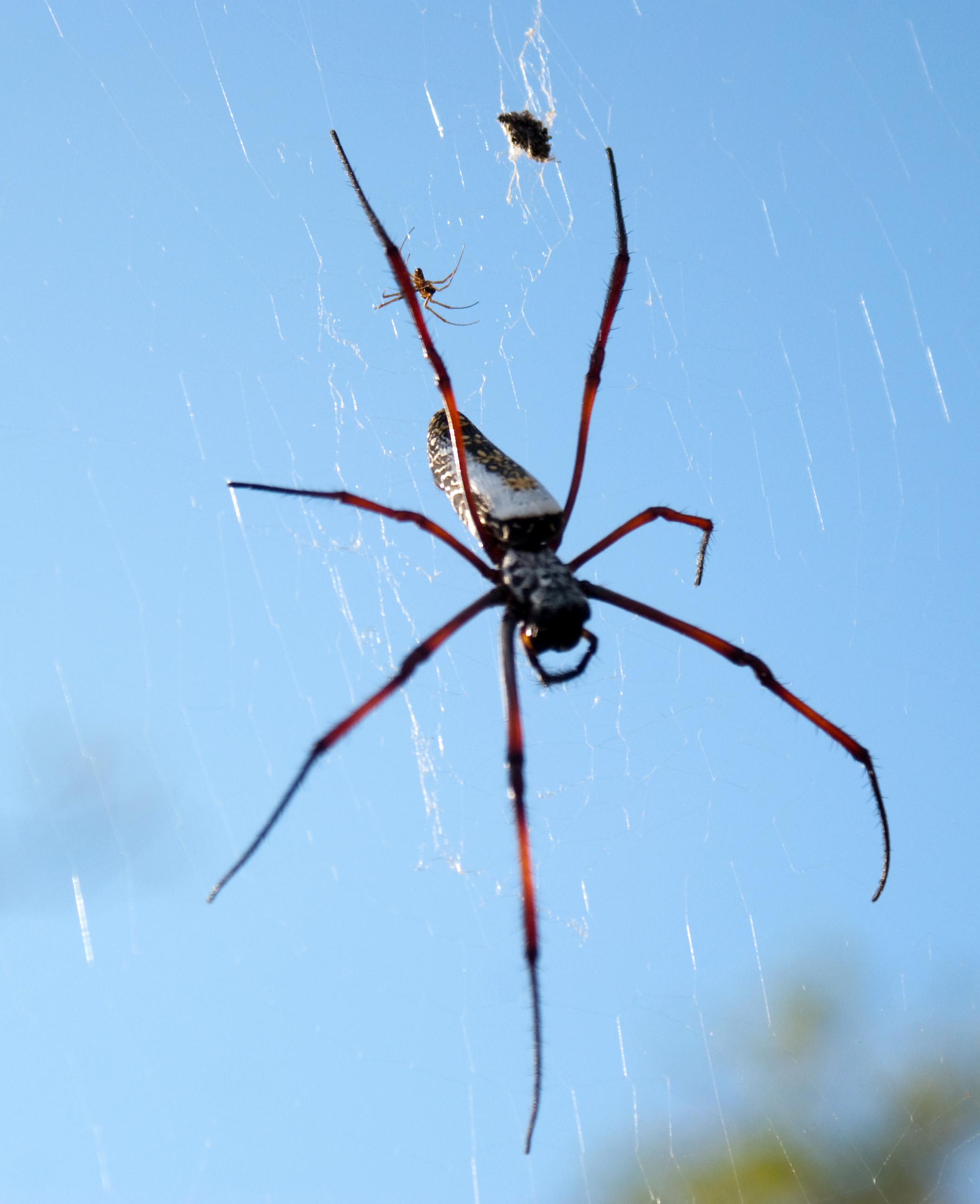
A spider of the genus Nephila on Juan de Nova Island.

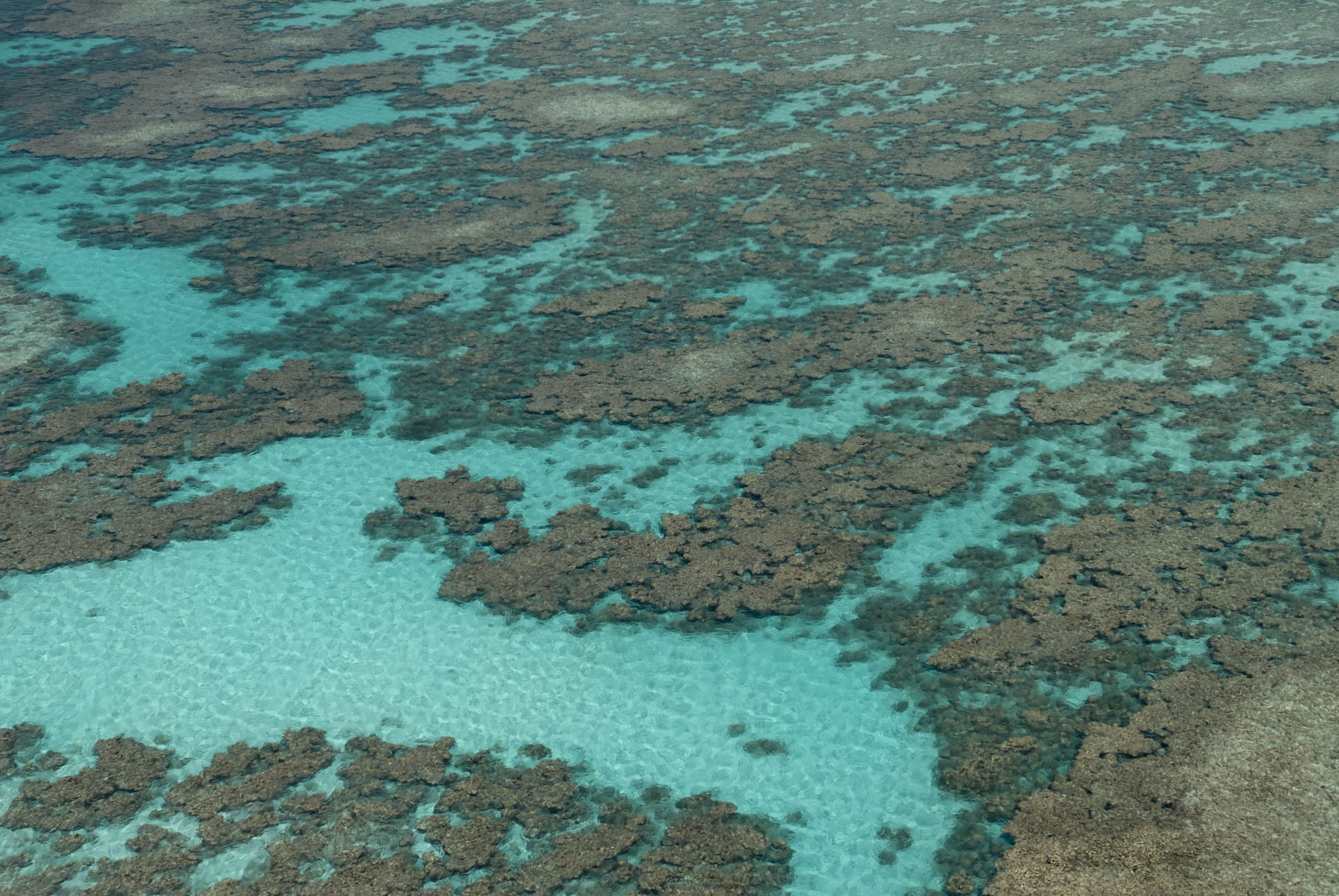
Coral reefs are an important part of Juan de Nova Island's biodiversity.

Three or four times a year, scientists come to Juan de Nova Island to study its ecosystem. Despite the ongoing scientific efforts, an inventory of the island's biodiversity (particularly genetics) is only in its earliest stages. There is much to be studied.

Researchers from the University of Reunion Island's ECOMAR lab have worked to identify or observe seabirds around the island. In particular, they have worked to study the behavior of 2 million pairs of terns that have sought refuge on the island, forming the largest colony in the Indian Ocean.

Pascale Chabanet, of the Institut de recherche pour le développement, says based on their research on the island:

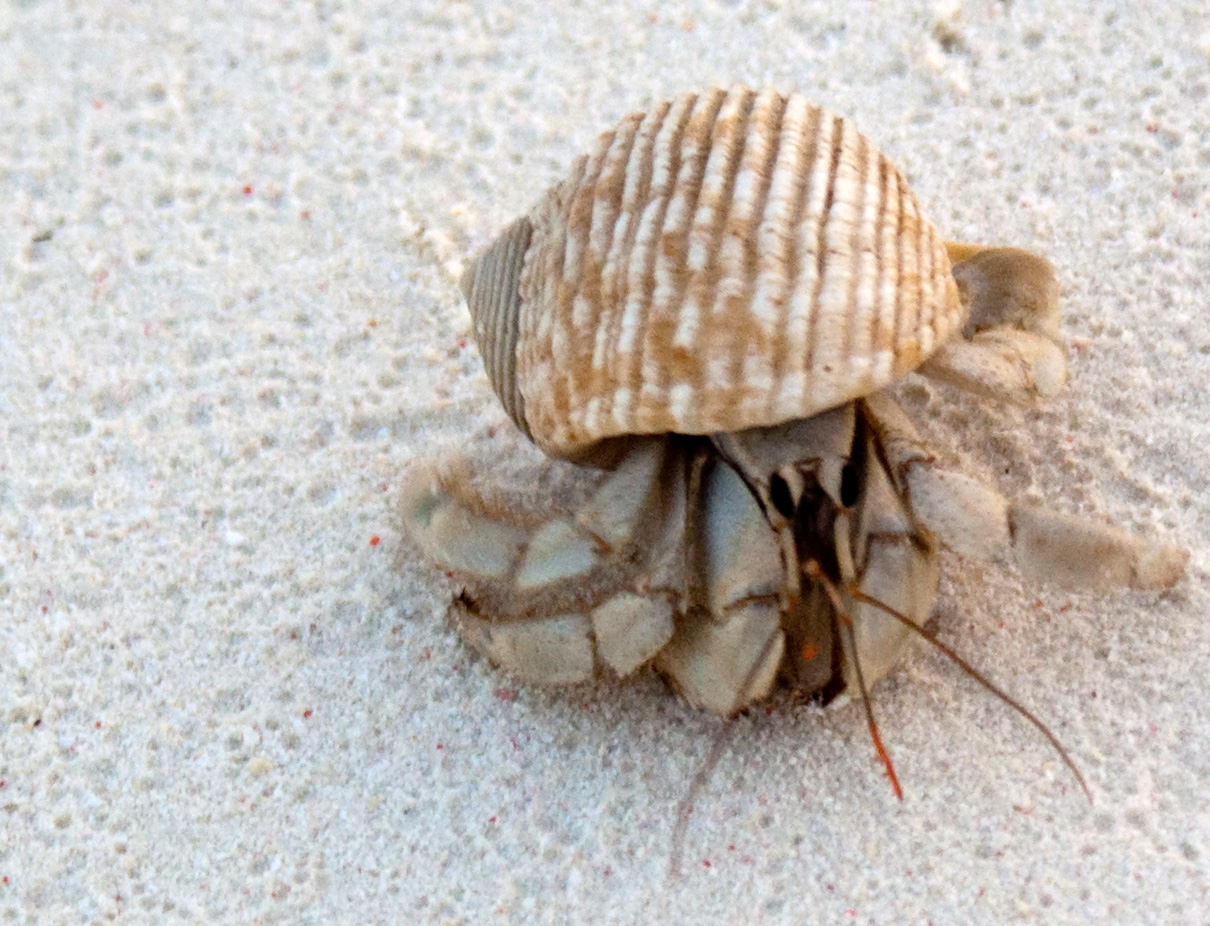
A crab from the Coenobitidae family on Juan de Nova Island.

"The reefs of these deserted and isolated islands like Juan de Nova Island are preserved from all pollution and anthropogenic influence. But they are affected by climate change."

Such environments are useful for scientists to measure to what degree environmental changes are attributable to humans.

The scientists are also observing and working to mitigate the impact of the presence of invasive species on the island, including mosquitoes such as Aedes aegypti, Aedes fryeri, Culex sitiens, Culex tritaeniorhynchus, and Mansonia uniformis. Aedes albopictus, an invasive Asian species that can carry pathogenic arbovirus, has also been seen on the island.

=== Important Bird Area ===
The island has been identified as an Important Bird Area by BirdLife International because it supports a very large colony of sooty terns, with up to 100,000 breeding pairs. It also has a much smaller colony of greater crested terns – with at least 50 breeding pairs recorded in 1994. Of at least seven species of land birds present, most are probably introduced.

== Geology ==
=== Climate ===
The island exhibits a tropical savanna climate (Köppen Aw). A year on the island can be divided into two seasons: the cool season and the rainy season.

	Period	Temperature	Precipitation	Humidity
Cool season	April to November	28.4 °C (April) to 25 °C (August)	1.9 mm to 39.6 mm	79% to 66%
Rainy season	December to March	Stable: 28.4 °C - 28.5 °C	100.7 mm to 275.8 mm	80% (December) to 83% (February)

Climate data for Juan de Nova Island
Month	Jan	Feb	Mar	Apr	May	Jun	Jul	Aug	Sep	Oct	Nov	Dec	Year
Record high °C (°F)	34 (93)	33 (91)	33 (91)	33 (91)	33 (91)	33 (91)	32 (90)	33 (91)	33 (91)	32 (90)	34 (93)	35 (95)	35 (95)
Mean daily maximum °C (°F)	30.1 (86.2)	30.0 (86.0)	30.4 (86.7)	30.2 (86.4)	28.9 (84.0)	27.4 (81.3)	26.8 (80.2)	26.9 (80.4)	27.7 (81.9)	28.8 (83.8)	29.9 (85.8)	30.4 (86.7)	28.9 (84.0)
Daily mean °C (°F)	28.3 (82.9)	28.2 (82.8)	28.6 (83.5)	28.3 (82.9)	27.2 (81.0)	25.7 (78.3)	24.9 (76.8)	25.0 (77.0)	25.6 (78.1)	26.7 (80.1)	27.8 (82.0)	28.4 (83.1)	27.1 (80.8)
Mean daily minimum °C (°F)	26.6 (79.9)	26.5 (79.7)	26.8 (80.2)	26.8 (80.2)	25.8 (78.4)	24.3 (75.7)	23.4 (74.1)	23.3 (73.9)	23.7 (74.7)	24.7 (76.5)	25.8 (78.4)	26.4 (79.5)	25.3 (77.5)
Record low °C (°F)	20 (68)	16 (61)	20 (68)	21 (70)	20 (68)	19 (66)	18 (64)	17 (63)	19 (66)	19 (66)	19 (66)	22 (72)	16 (61)
Average precipitation mm (inches)	324 (12.8)	289 (11.4)	140 (5.5)	21 (0.8)	18 (0.7)	9 (0.4)	11 (0.4)	4 (0.2)	1 (0.0)	8 (0.3)	22 (0.9)	139 (5.5)	986 (38.8)
Average precipitation days (≥ 0.1 mm)	13	13	9	5	3	3	2	1	1	2	3	10	65
Average relative humidity (%)	80	81	78	74	71	70	71	72	74	75	75	77	75
Mean monthly sunshine hours	229.4	203.4	257.3	276.0	282.1	273.0	275.9	285.2	282.0	313.1	300.0	251.1	3,228.5
Mean daily sunshine hours	7.4	7.2	8.3	9.2	9.1	9.1	8.9	9.2	9.4	10.1	10.0	8.1	8.8
Source: Deutscher Wetterdienst
