= Richard Tottenham =

Richard Tottenham may refer to:

- Richard Tottenham (obstetrician)
- Richard Tottenham (civil servant)
