= Richard Tottenham (obstetrician) =

Obstetrician and gynaecologist (1889–1971)

Richard Edward Tottenham FRCOG (1889–1971) was the inaugural professor of obstetrics and gynaecology at the University of Hong Kong. He was a foundation fellow of the Royal College of Obstetricians and Gynaecologists. He served with the Royal Navy during the First World War.

His memoir of his time as an obstetrician and gynaecologist in Hong Kong is held in the archives of the Royal College of Obstetricians and Gynaecologists.

== Selected publications ==
- Aids to Gynæcology. Balliere, Tindall and Cox, 1932.
