= Salvatore de Pilestrina =

Mapmaker in Mallorca in the early 16th century

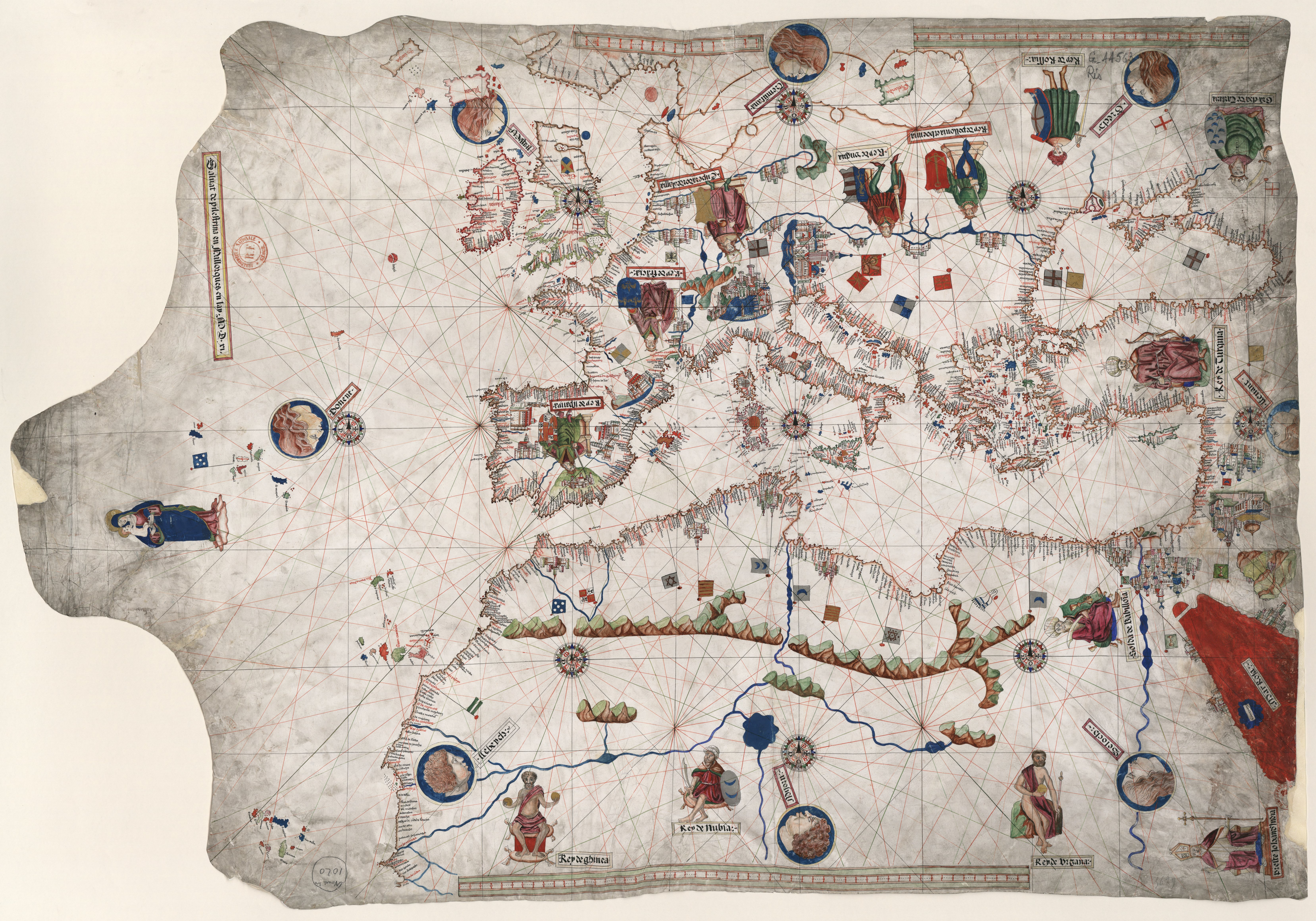
A 1843 copy of a map of the northeastern Atlantic Ocean, the Mediterranean Sea, and the Black Sea by Salvatore de Pilestrina.

Salvatore de Pilestrina (fl. 1502–1533), also known as Salvat de Pilestrina, was a mapmaker in Mallorca in the early 16th century.

Scholars suggest he was of Italian origin, in part because his work combines Italian and Catalan mapmaking techniques of the period. He likely traveled from Italy to Mallorca to study cartography there.

His known period of activity spans from 1502 to 1533.

Pilestrina is known for his work on portolan charts, and he was active with the Majorcan cartographic school. He created several significant maps of the Mediterranean, the originals of which have been lost. He is also thought to have produced a number of other maps that extended to the Americas, including a map of the Atlantic coast of Central America.

His first known chart was a major world map, produced around 1503. Other known works were produced in 1504 or 1505, in 1511, and in 1533. While other maps have been attributed to him, their origins are contested by historians.
