= Fort Totten State Historic Site =

Historic fort in North Dakota, US

- Fort Totten
- U.S. National Register of Historic Places
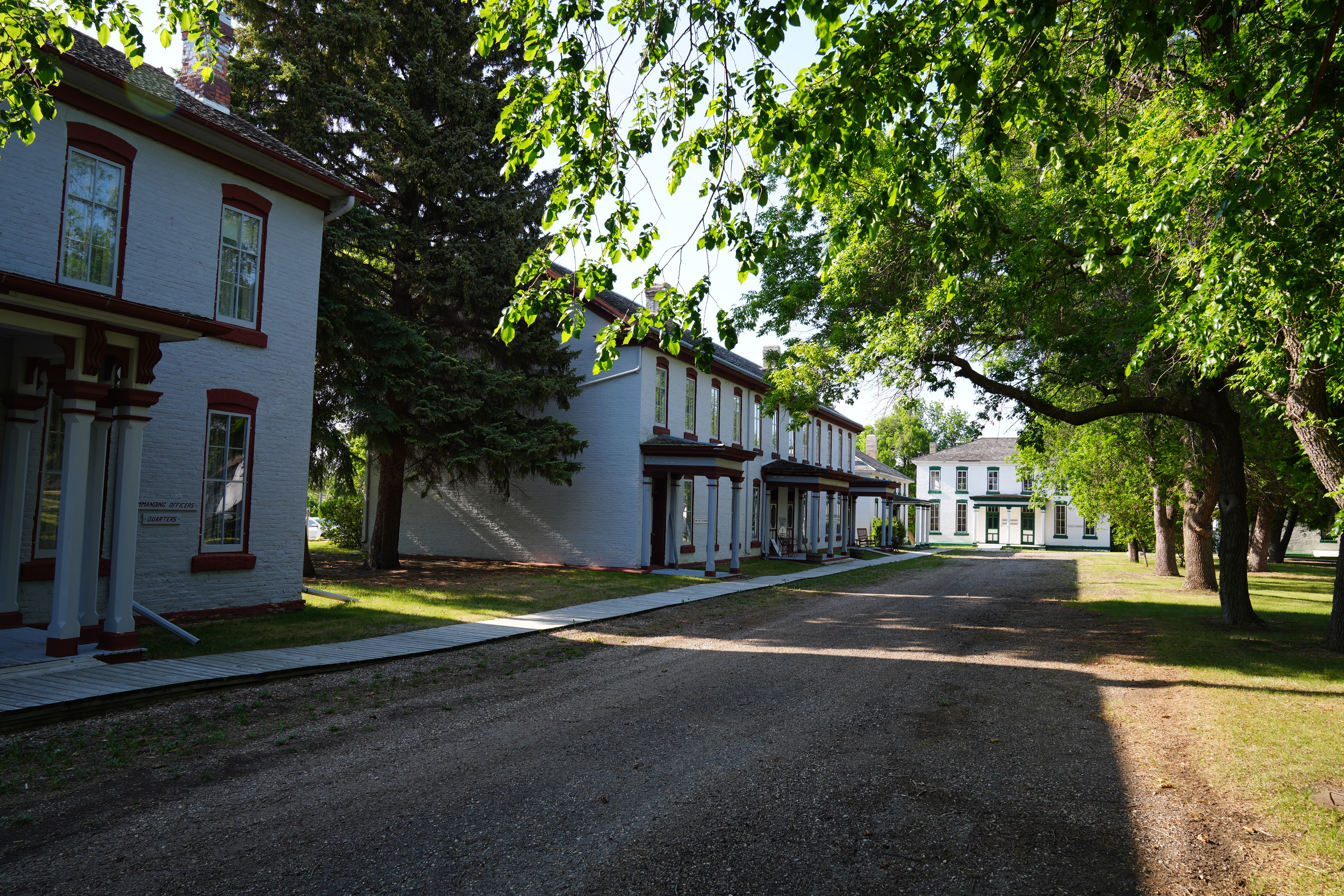
- Buildings at Fort Totten in 2021

- Location within North Dakota Location within the United States
- Location: South of Fort Totten off ND 57
- Nearest city: Fort Totten, North Dakota
- Coordinates: 47°58′39″N 98°59′35″W
- Area: 9.81 acres (3.97 ha)
- Built: 1868
- Website: Official website
- NRHP reference No.: 71000629
- Added to NRHP: December 9, 1971

Fort Totten State Historic Site is a historic fort that sits on the shores of Devils Lake near Fort Totten, North Dakota. During its 13 years of operation as a fort, Fort Totten was used during the American Indian Wars to enforce the peace among local Native American tribes and to protect transportation routes. After its closing in 1890, it operated until 1959 as a Native American boarding school, called the Fort Totten Indian Industrial School. It was added to the National Register of Historic Places in 1971; in its nomination form, the State Historical Society of North Dakota called it "one of the best preserved military posts... in the Trans-Mississippi West for the Indian Wars period".

== History ==
=== Fort Totten ===
Fort Totten was one of nearly 150 forts constructed across the American western frontier during the American Indian Wars. Following the conclusion of the Dakota War of 1862, several displaced Dakota people (who now form the Spirit Lake Tribe) had been relocated to the area around Devils Lake. During the mid-1860s, Major General John Pope had put forth plans to create a line of forts across the newly formed Dakota Territory. One of these was to be located on the shores of Devils Lake. Although Pope canceled his plans for this fort in the fall of 1864, efforts to establish a military foothold there were revitalized in early 1867. This was due to a new treaty signed by the Sissetons and Wahpetons that established two new reservations in Dakota Territory: Lake Traverse Indian Reservation to the south and Devils Lake Indian Reservation (now the Spirit Lake Indian Reservation) in the north. The latter was to be a 240,000-acre (97,000 ha) reservation encompassing the southern shore of Devils Lake. Fort Totten was officially established by the Secretary of War on July 17, 1867. It was named for United States Army Corps of Engineers head Joseph Gilbert Totten.

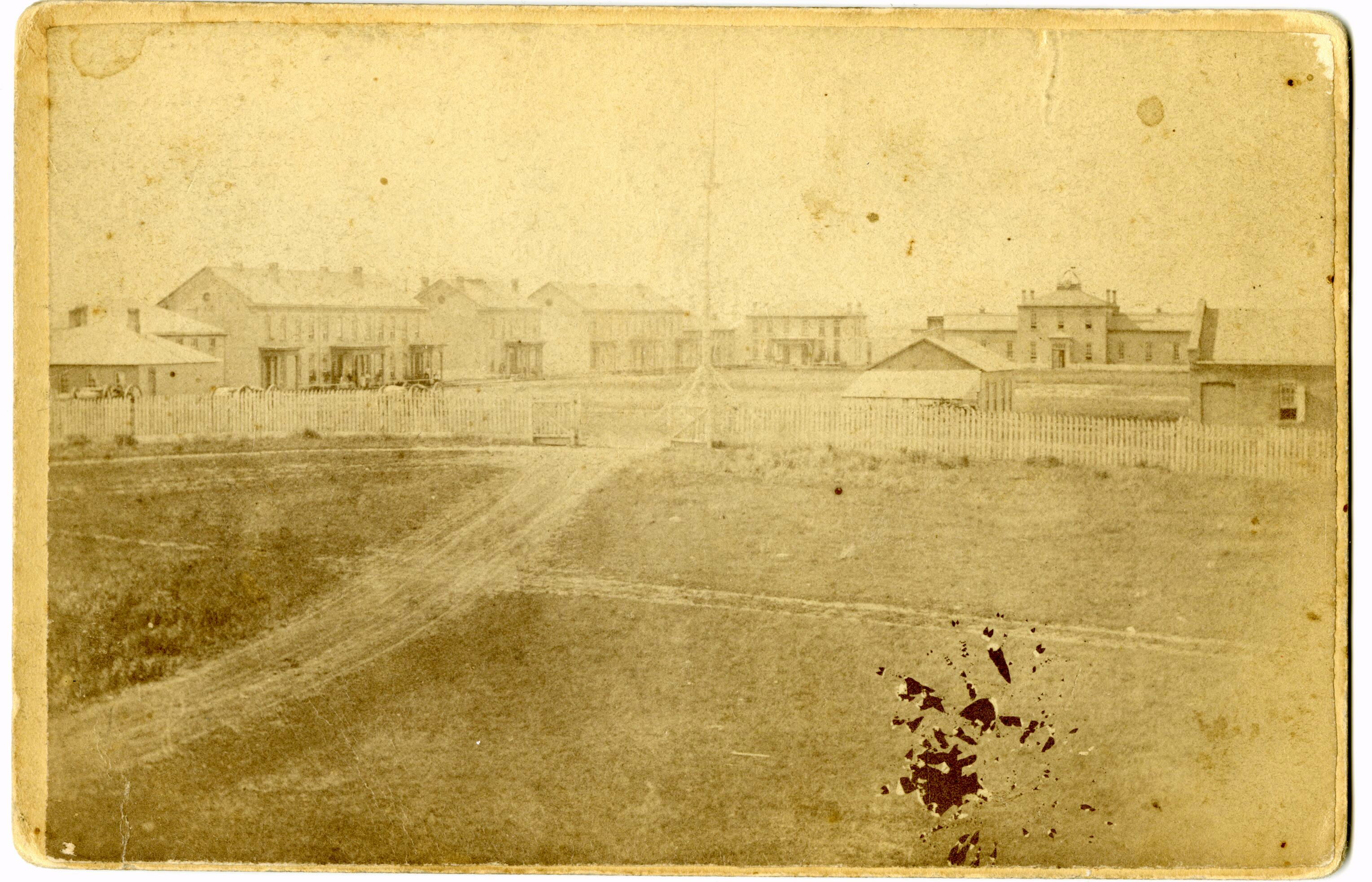
Early Fort Totten, 19th century

The Spirit Lake Tribe had faced severe hardship since arriving in the region, and the winter of 1866–1867 had been particularly difficult. As such, the first missions of the fort were to support the tribe and offer protection from raids. The initial fort was meant to be temporary and was quickly constructed out of oak logs surrounded by an 18-foot-tall (5.5 m) log stockade and spanned about 600 by 400 feet (180 by 120 m). This lumber was provided by a sawmill at nearby Fort Stevenson. By 1868, soldiers—United States Army infantrymen who were garrisoned there—were already constructing more permanent buildings, although official authorization from Congress to do this was not granted until April 6, 1869. The new main building was placed about 800 yards (730 m) south of the original log structure and was completed in 1871. The following decade saw a boom of new construction, expanding in a square pattern around a central plaza. This center yard was used for drills and military parades. New buildings included a hospital, mess hall, four barracks, storehouses, and multiple other stores and offices. All of these additions, including the main building, cost about $100,000. Most were built from bricks crafted from locally sourced clay and lime quarried at Devils Lake and placed on stone foundations. Later additions included corrals and stables for horses and livestock, a brewery, and a sutler. Besides one barracks building that was razed by fire, most buildings from this period are still standing and are maintained. In 1873, Companies D and I of the 7th Cavalry Regiment joined the Fort Totten garrison and remained there until the fort's eventual closing; and until its closing, the fort was continuously manned. Soldiers here oversaw the 1874 establishment of the nearby St. Michael's Mission school. Fort Totten was also the gathering point for an expedition to survey the border between the United States and British Canada in the 1870s.

As war waned and the threat of raids dwindled, the army struggled to justify its upkeep of a strong military presence across the American frontier. At Fort Totten specifically, the area was so rural that it almost never saw combat. Additionally, the Spirit Lake Tribe had long since become self-sufficient. Indeed, as historian Heather Mulliner writes, "the army’s presence at Totten had become more a nuisance than a source of support." The Spirit Lake Tribe had established their own government and police force, who often clashed with the soldiers at Fort Totten. At the fort, more and more idle soldiers were turning to alcohol and beginning to become unruly. With the army unable to justify its presence on Devils Lake any longer, Fort Totten was decommissioned and abandoned on December 20, 1890.

=== Boarding school and later history ===
After its decommissioning, Congress turned over Fort Totten to the Bureau of Indian Affairs, who repurposed it into a Native American boarding school. The new Fort Totten Indian Industrial School focused on assimilating local Native American children into white American society, introducing them to desired ways of life, and cutting them off from their indigenous cultures. Alongside their regular academic studies, additional classes for practical skills were segregated by gender; girls learned homemaking skills, such as cooking and cleaning, while boys were taught industrial skills such as carpentry, woodworking, agriculture, and other trades. Most pupils were from western North Dakota and Montana; most local families, especially those at Spirit Lake, favored St. Michael's Mission due to Fort Totten's rigid structure and English-only curriculum. Meanwhile, classes at St. Michael's Mission were bilingual until 1887. Additionally, Fort Totten imposed harsh punishments on its students for rulebreaking. By 1910, Fort Totten had introduced a system that allowed local students to commute and live at home, rather than boarding. Although this increased enrollments and as such improved the school's revenue, due to financial struggles, the school briefly closed from 1917 to 1919. At its height, Fort Totten Indian Industrial School had as many as 400 pupils enrolled.

By the time the boarding school was founded, the buildings were in dire need of maintenance. Due to the cold but humid climate, the brick buildings had to be frequently painted to keep the structures from crumbling, and the school's pupils supplied most of the manual labor to upkeep the physical school. Several of the original fort buildings were demolished during the boarding school period: the dead house, well house, a guardhouse, and half of one of the mess halls. A gymnasium was constructed over the spot where the destroyed barracks and mess hall had once stood. Hallways were constructed to connect two of the former barracks to two former officers' quarters. A water tower was also built. The Fort Totten Little Theater, built during this time period, also still stands today.

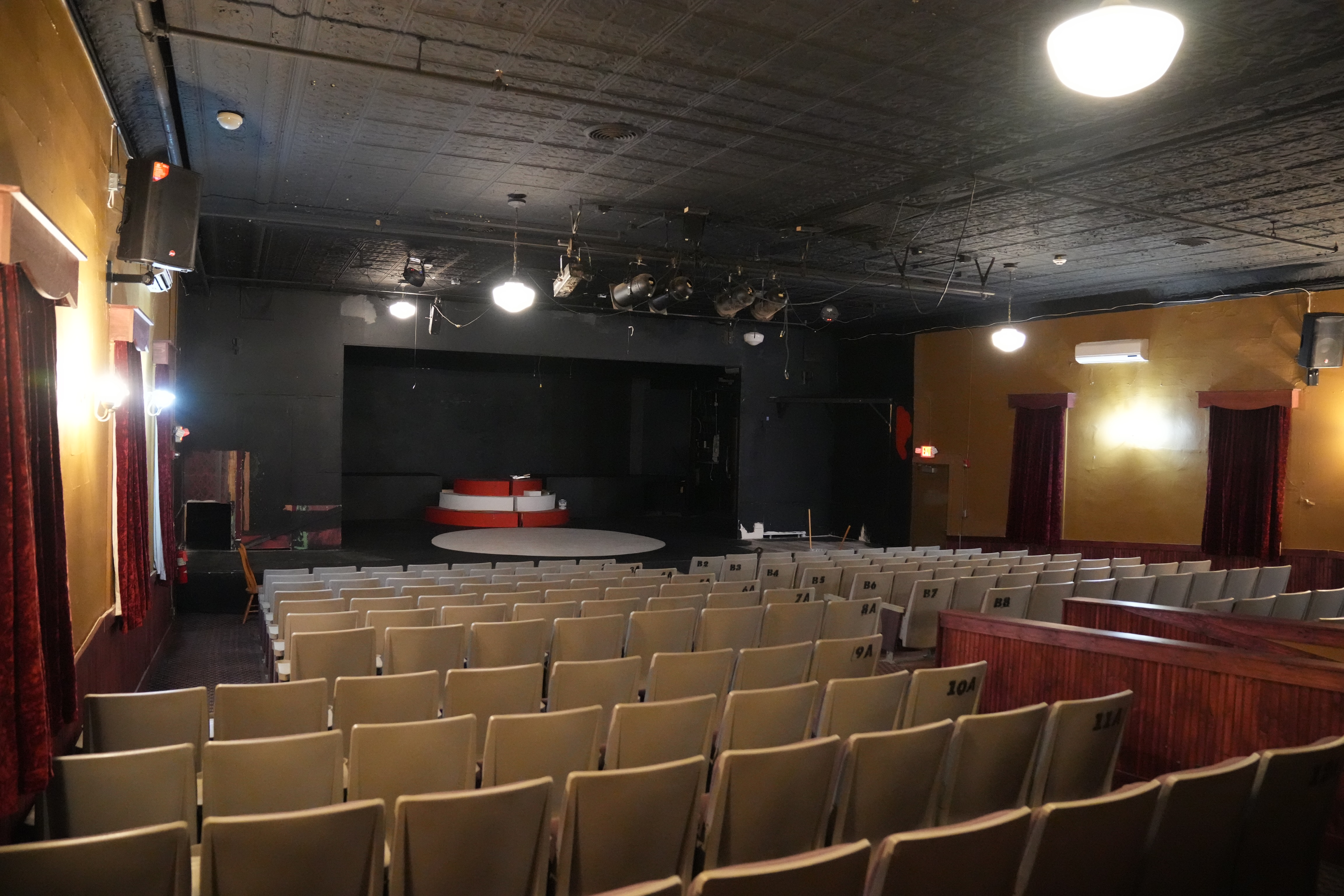
The Fort Totten Little Theater

By the time the Great Depression started, the school had partially converted into a day school, with dormitories still maintained for boarding students. Between 1935 and 1939, it hosted a preventorium for Dakota children suffering from tuberculosis. Its financial situation never recovered after the Great Depression, and in 1959, a new campus opened east of the Fort Totten location. On March 6, 1959, Fort Totten ceased operations and the BIA turned the property over to the State Historical Society of North Dakota; its ownership began in 1960. Fort Totten became a North Dakota State Historic Site later that year and was listed on the National Register of Historic Places on December 9, 1971, and the State of North Dakota allocated funds for renovations. Only the buildings and area immediately surrounding the central square are included in the listing, and nothing of the original fort remains outside this area. One of the former officers' quarters was restored and converted into the Totten Trail Historic Inn in 2001 and 2002, which functions both as a hotel and also as a conference and event venue. In 2015, the State of North Dakota and the State Historical Society of North Dakota jointly allocated and raised $600,000 for renovations to the cafeteria/hospital building.

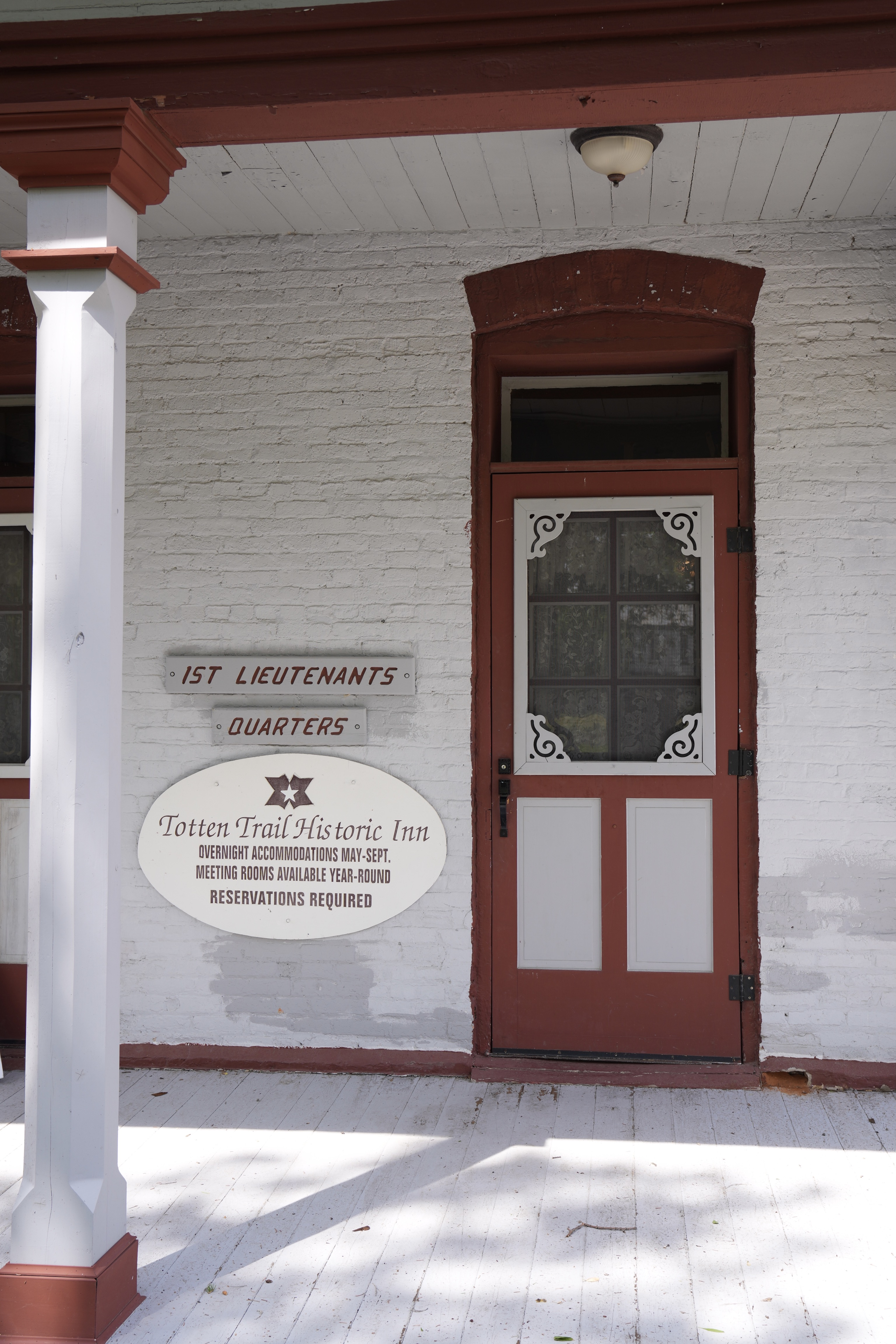
Original First Lieutenant's quarters, now the Totten Trail Historic Inn

== Museum ==
Visitors can access an interpretive center, take a walking tour of 16 original buildings, visit the Pioneer Daughter's Museum, take in a show at the Fort Totten Little Theatre, and stay at the Totten Trail Historic Inn bed and breakfast. School children often attend the "Fort Totten Living History Field Day" in September.

== Gallery ==
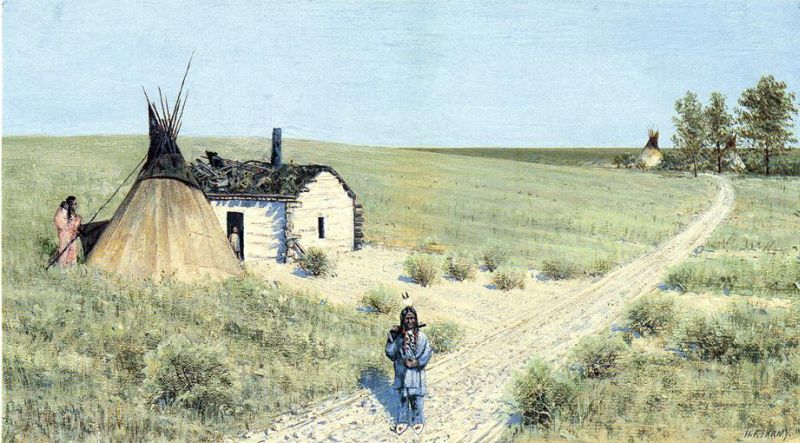
Fort Totten trail, by Henry Farny

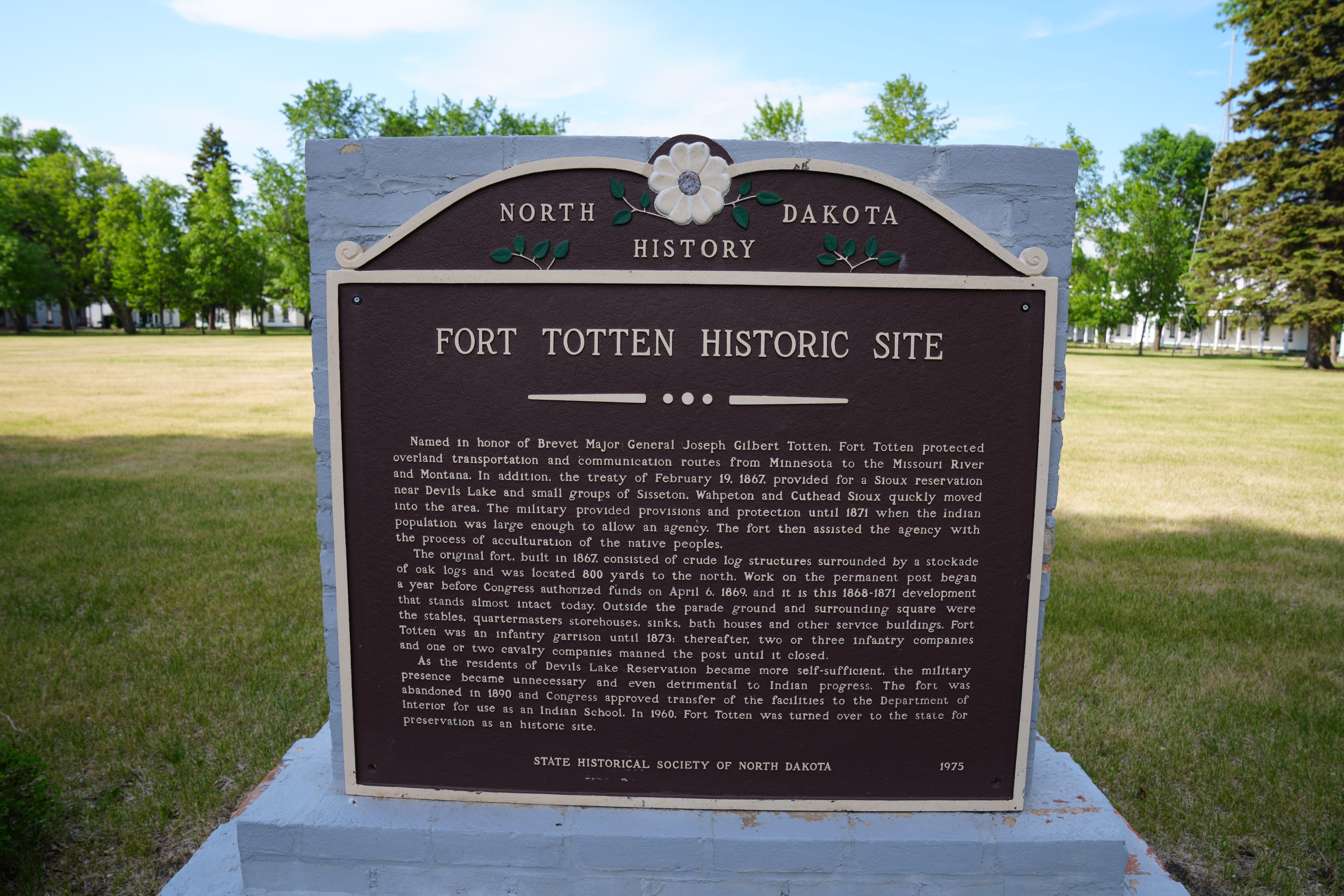
Fort Totten Historic Site marker

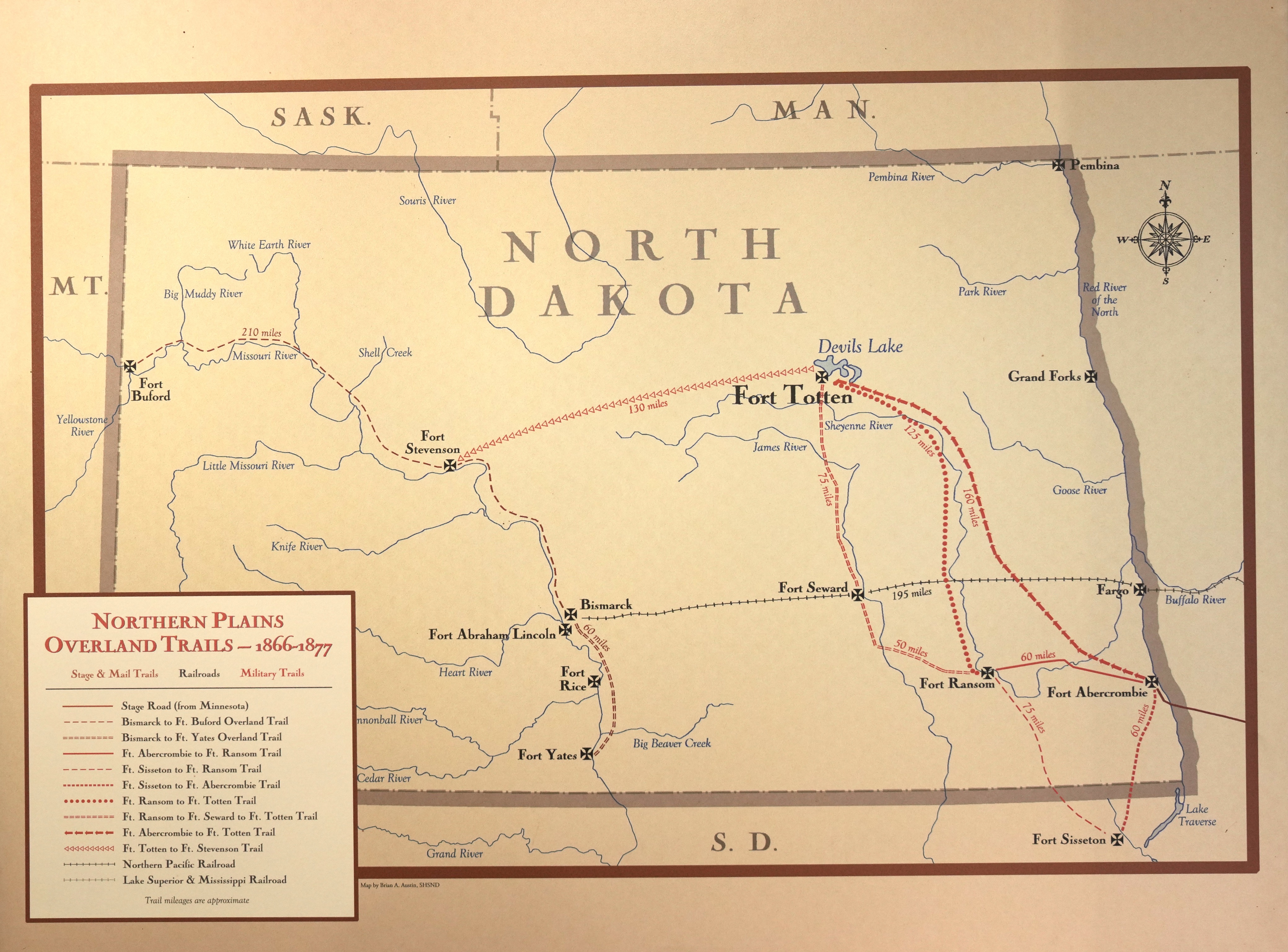
Northern Plains Overland Trails 1866-1877 map on display at the Fort Totten Historic Site
