= Fort Totten =

Fort Totten may refer to:

- Fort Totten (Queens), a Civil War–era military installation in New York City
- Fort Totten, North Dakota
  - Fort Totten State Historic Site, a Dakota frontier-era fort and Native American boarding school
- Fort Totten (Washington, D.C.), a neighborhood in north east Washington, D.C.
  - Fort Totten (WMATA station), a Metro station in Washington, D.C.
  - Fort Totten Park, a Civil War fort and site of a park in Washington, D.C.
