= Charles Tottenham =

Charles Tottenham may refer to:

- Charles Tottenham (1685–1758), Irish Member of Parliament for New Ross
- Charles Tottenham (1716–1795), Irish MP for Fethard, New Ross, Bannow and Clonmines
- Charles Tottenham (1738–1806), MP for Fethard and Wexford; later Charles Loftus, 1st Marquess of Ely
- Charles Tottenham (1743–1823), MP for New Ross
- Charles Tottenham (1768–1843), MP for New Ross
- Charles Tottenham (1807–1886), MP for New Ross
- Charles George Tottenham (1835–1918), MP for New Ross
- Charles Tottenham, 8th Marquess of Ely (1913–2006), English-born peer
