= SS Tottenham (1901) =

British ship wrecked in 1911 on a French island in the Indian Ocean

Coordinates: 17.076287°S 42.719961°E

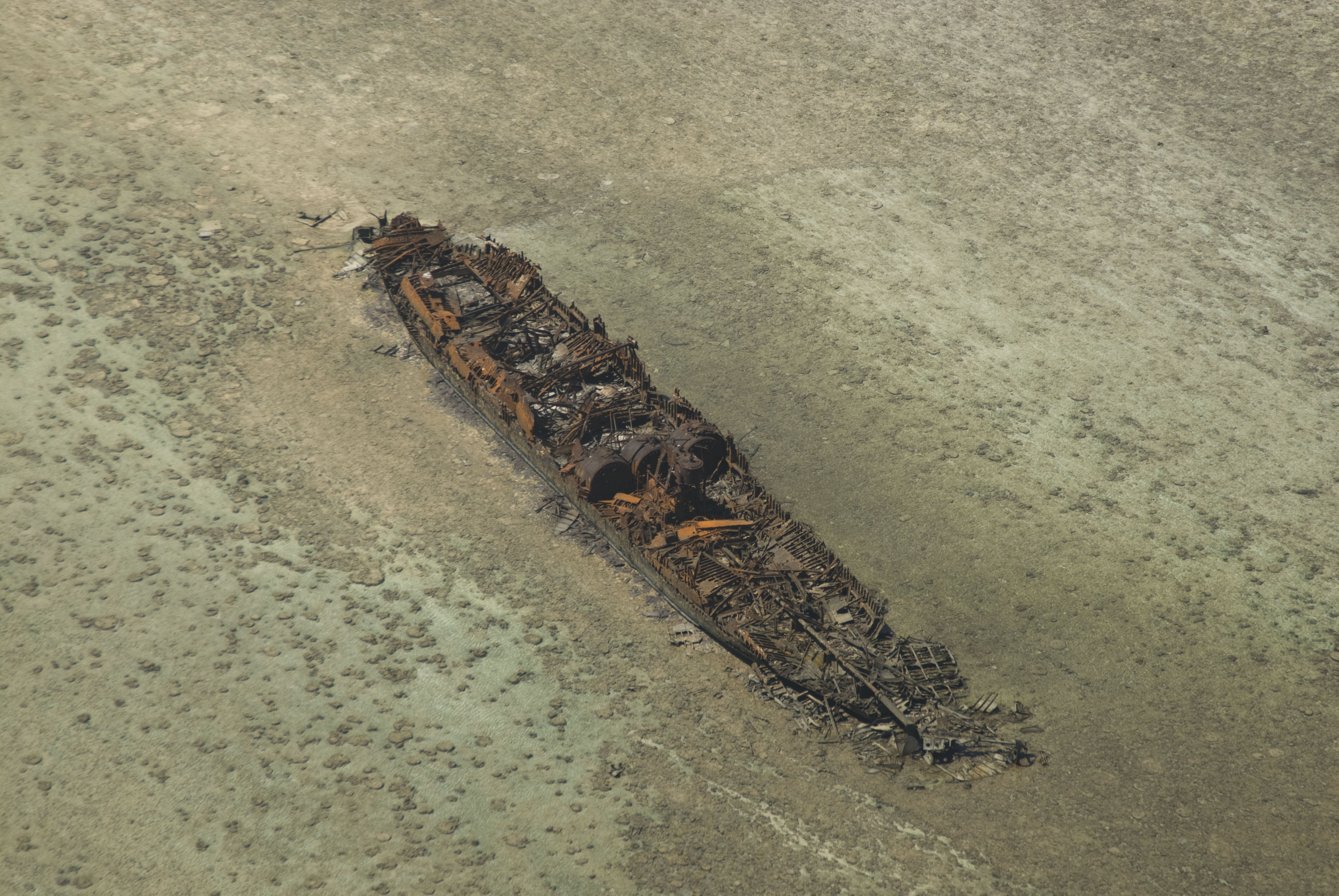
- Wreck of SS Tottenham on Juan de Nova Island, France

History
- Name: Tottenham (1901–1904); Brinkburn (1904); Tottenham (1904–1911)
- Owner: Britain Steamship Co. (1901–1904); Harris & Dixon (1904); Watts, Watts & Co. Ltd. (1904–1911)
- Builder: Ropner & Sons Ltd.
- Yard number: 379
- Launched: 18.02.1901
- Completed: 03.1901
- Acquired: 1904 Harris & Dixon Ltd., London; 1904 Britain S.S. Co. Ltd. (Watts, Watts & Co.), London
- In service: 1901-1911
- Identification: Official number: 112827
- Fate: Wrecked 1911

General characteristics
- Type: Cargo ship
- Tonnage: 4,494 GRT
- Length: 112.8 m (370 ft)
- Beam: 15.5 m (51 ft)
- Draft: 5.8 m (19 ft)
- Installed power: 3 × Scotch boilers; Triple-expansion steam engine 429 hp (320 kW)

SS Tottenham was a British ship that wrecked on the southern fringing reef of Juan de Nova Island, France on 2 February 1911 in the Indian Ocean on the reefs south-west of the French island of Juan de Nova.

The remains of the hull and machinery still lie there.
