= Edwin Benson =

Last speaker of Mandan language

- Wéroke Wáatashe
- Born: October 23, 1931; Elbowoods, North Dakota
- Died: December 9, 2016 (aged 85)
- Citizenship: Three Affiliated Tribes of the Fort Berthold Reservation and American
- Known for: Being the last native speaker of Mandan

Edwin James Benson (October 23, 1931 – December 9, 2016; Ma-doke-wa-des-she, modern Mandan orthography: Wéroke Wáatashe, Iron Bison) was a Native American educator and the last native speaker of the Mandan language. He was born in Elbowoods, North Dakota, on the Fort Berthold Reservation in McLean County, North Dakota. When the Garrison Dam was built, Benson and his family were relocated to Twin Buttes, North Dakota. He taught Mandan at Twin Buttes Elementary School, and was awarded an honorary doctorate from the University of North Dakota in 2009. He was involved in efforts to teach the basics of Mandan to youth. When he died on December 9, 2016, the Mandan language became extinct.

The documentary To Save a Language (2020) showed the efforts of the Estonian linguist Indrek Park who tried to learn and save the Mandan language.
