= Edward Lone Fight =

Native American political leader (1939–2025)

Chairman of the Mandan, Hidatsa and Arikara Nation (Three Affiliated Tribes)
- In office 1986–1990

Tribal programs manager for the Three Affiliated Tribes
- In office 1994–1998

Superintendent of Mandaree School, Mandaree, North Dakota
- In office ? – Retired in 2000

Personal details
- Born: May 29, 1939 Elbowoods, North Dakota, U.S.
- Died: November 1, 2025 (aged 86) Stanley, North Dakota, U.S.
- Relations: Parents, Mabel Good Bird and Theodore Lone Fight; descendant of Buffalo Bird Woman, Sheheke, and Chief Four Bears
- Education: Biology graduate, Dickinson State University; Master's degrees in Education and Public Administration
- Fluent speaker: Hidatsa language

Edward Lone Fight (May 28, 1939 – November 1, 2025) was a Native American political leader who served as Chairman of the Mandan, Hidatsa and Arikara Nation (Three Affiliated Tribes) from 1986 to 1990.

== Career ==
In 1988, Lone Fight met with President Ronald Reagan, a meeting which was the catalyst for the Just Compensation Bill, introduced based on the findings of the Joint Tribal Advisory Committee, which provided the tribes partial compensation for the flooding of reservation due to the construction of the Garrison Dam under the Pick-Sloan Legislation.

From 1994 to 1998, he served as the tribal program's manager for the Three Affiliated Tribes. He retired as Superintendent of Mandaree School, Mandaree, North Dakota, in 2000.

== Personal life ==
Lone Fight was a fluent speaker of the Hidatsa language and a traditionalist. He graduated from Dickinson State University with a major in biology; one of the earliest Native Americans to do so. He also held a master's degree in education and a master's degree in public administration.

The son of Mabel Good Bird and Theodore Lone Fight, Edward was also a direct descendant of Waheenie Wea (Buffalo Bird Woman), Sheheke, and Chief Four Bears. "Lone Fight" is a broad family name related exclusively to the Mandan, Hidatsa and Arikara Nation of the Fort Berthold Reservation in North Dakota.

Lone Fight died in Stanley, North Dakota, on November 1, 2025, at the age of 86.
