= Tillie Fay Walker =

American activist

- Hishua Adesh
- Born: July 11, 1928; Fort Berthold Indian Reservation, North Dakota, U.S.
- Died: February 3, 2018 (age 89); Bismarck, North Dakota, U.S.
- Other name: Blossoming Mint
- Occupations: Activist, community leader

Tillie Fay Walker (July 11, 1928 – February 3, 2018), also known as Hishua Adesh (Blossoming Mint), was an American civil rights activist and community leader. She was an enrolled member of the Mandan, Hidatsa, and Arikara Nation. She helped recruit and organize Native American participants in the Poor People's Campaign led by Martin Luther King Jr.

== Early life and education ==
Walker was born on the Fort Berthold Indian Reservation in North Dakota, the daughter of Hans Walker Sr. and Mercy Baker Walker. Both Mandan and Hidatsa were spoken in her childhood home. Her family was relocated for the building of Garrison Dam. She attended a mission school at Elbowoods, graduated from Sanish High School, and earned a bachelor's degree at the University of Nebraska in 1955. Her brother Hans C. Walker Jr. became a lawyer, and was named head of the federal Indian Water Rights Office in 1971.

== Career ==
Walker moved to Philadelphia after college, and worked for the American Friends Service Committee (AFSC). She succeeded Vine Deloria Jr. as director of the United Scholarship Service, funding secondary education for Native American youth, from the program's office in Denver. In 1967, she testified before a Senate hearing on Indian education. In 1968, she was profiled in a Vogue magazine article titled "The Thinking Indians". She met with Martin Luther King Jr., and joined the Poor People's Campaign to recruit Native Americans to the civil rights movement. "She believed passionately that the poor of every race were fighting the same battle," explained one historian of the campaign.

From 1978 to 1988, Walker was elected to a tribal council seat in Mandaree, and she served on the Garrison Unit Joint Tribal Advisory Committee, to secure more compensation for the residents of Fort Berthold displaced by the Garrison Dam project. She testified before a Senate hearing in 1983, about health care and legal services funding for her tribe. She donated money and other support to the Three Affiliated Tribes Museum, and helped place Independence Congregational Church on the National Register of Historic Places. In 1997 she worked with the North Dakota Heritage Center on an exhibit titled "Sacred Beauty: Quill Work by Plains Women". In her last years, she and her sister donated the Knife River Ranch to the Mandan, Hidatsa, and Arikara Nation.

Chippewa Cree lawyer and professor Alan R. Parker assisted Walker as a field worker in Denver in the 1960s. She worked with Harris Sherman and Vernon Bellecourt on various protest campaigns in the 1970s. She was a friend and mentor to Clyde Warrior, Mel Thom, Hank Adams, and other early members of the National Indian Youth Council.

== Publications ==
- "American Indian Children: Foster Care and Adoptions" (1976)

== Personal life ==
After several years living with Alzheimer's disease, Walker died in 2018, at the age of 89, in Bismarck, North Dakota. Senator Heidi Heitkamp read a tribute to Walker into the Congressional Record later that month. February 7 is observed as "Tillie Walker Day" by the Mandan, Hidatsa, and Arikara Nation.
