= Alyce Spotted Bear =

Native American politician (1945–2013)

- Born: December 17, 1945; Elbowoods, Fort Berthold Indian Reservation, North Dakota, US
- Died: August 13, 2013 (aged 67); Bismarck, North Dakota, US
- Education: Dickinson State University (BA) Pennsylvania State College (M.Ed.) Cornell University (Ph.D.)

Alyce Spotted Bear (Mandan: Numakshi Mihe, December 17, 1945 – August 13, 2013) was a Native American educator and politician and an enrolled member of the Mandan, Hidatsa, and Arikara Nation.

== Early life and education ==
Born in Elbowoods on the Fort Berthold Reservation of the Mandan, Hidatsa, and Arikara Nation, North Dakota, Spotted Bear received her bachelor's degree in education from Dickinson State University, Dickinson, North Dakota in 1970.

== Career ==
Spotted Bear served as chairwoman of the Mandan, Hidatsa, and Arikara Tribe from 1982 to 1987. Environmental issues were a key focus of her term in office. One of her major initiatives involved seeking compensation for lands flooded by the construction of the Garrison Dam in 1953; this initiative was ultimately successful, with the tribe receiving $149.2 million in 1992. Her administration also strongly supported the passage of the Fort Berthold Mineral Restoration Act. Some of Spotted Bear's other policies included revising the tribal constitution to increase the Tribal Business Council's authority and providing scholarships to Fort Berthold Community College. Cultural revival was another of Spotted Bear's priorities; in 1983 she re-established a buffalo herd on the Fort Berthold Reservation starting with 56 animals from Theodore Roosevelt National Park.

After her time as chairwoman, Spotted Bear obtained a master's degree from Pennsylvania State University in the American Indian Leadership Program and subsequently began PhD studies at Cornell University. She worked at all levels of education, from preschool to college, as a school administrator and later as a superintendent. While at Cornell, she contributed to a journal article analyzing the effectiveness of consolidating schools. She found that consolidation only benefited a small number of students and larger adverse effects were being ignored. She argued that “the school is the hub of the community…the place that the community revolves around.” She also taught at the Fort Berthold Community College, now Nueta Hidatsa Sahnish College, in New Town, North Dakota, where she was the vice-president of the Native Studies department and instrumental in the establishment of degree programs in Native Studies. During her time at FBCC, Spotted Bear founded the Tribal Relations Program. She also advocated for Mandan language preservation and directed a project to produce digital records of Edwin Benson, the last native speaker of Mandan.

In 2010, President Barack Obama appointed Spotted Bear to the National Advisory Committee on Indian Education. In this capacity she was an advocate for language immersion schools.

== Death and legacy ==
Spotted Bear died in Bismarck, North Dakota of cancer.

In 2016, Congress created the Alyce Spotted Bear and Walter Soboleff Commission on Native Children, through a bill co-sponsored by Heidi Heitkamp and Lisa Murkowski. The commission is charged with examining the challenges faced by Native children, cataloging existing programs and grants available for these children, and making recommendations for improvements to existing services. In 2021, the deadline for the commission's report was extended to 2023.

== Works ==
- Haller, Emil J.; Monk, David H.; Spotted Bear, Alyce; Griffith, Julie; Moss, Pamela (1990). "School Size and Program Comprehensiveness: Evidence from 'High School and beyond'". Educational Evaluation and Policy Analysis. 12 (2): 109–120. doi:10.3102/01623737012002109. S2CID 145308811.

== See also ==
- List of Native American politicians
- Native American women in politics
