= Raymond Cross =

Native American attorney from North Dakota (1948–2023)

- Born: August 24, 1948; Elbowoods, Fort Berthold Indian Reservation, North Dakota, U.S.
- Died: January 24, 2023 (aged 74); Tucson, Arizona, U.S.
- Citizenship: Three Affiliated Tribes of the Fort Berthold Reservation; U.S.
- Education: Stanford University; Yale Law School (JD)
- Occupations: attorney; law professor
- Spouse: Kathleen Johnston (m. 1989)
- Children: 2
- Parent(s): Martin Cross; Dorothy Cross

Raymond "Ray" Cross (August 24, 1948 – January 24, 2023) was a Native American attorney and law professor from the U.S. state of North Dakota. He was a citizen of the Mandan, Hidatsa, and Arikara Nation, also known as the Three Affiliated Tribes, and a former professor of American Indian Law at the University of Montana. As an attorney, Cross represented Native Americans in multiple landmark trials, including two U.S. Supreme Court cases, and successfully won a compensation claim against the U.S. government for the flooding of 156,000 acres of tribal land in North Dakota due to the construction of the Garrison Dam.

== Early life and education ==
Raymond Cross was born on August 24, 1948, in Elbowoods, North Dakota, on the Fort Berthold Indian Reservation. The youngest of ten siblings, Cross was raised in a rustic farmhouse without running water or electricity. His father, Martin Cross, was tribal chairman of the Mandan, Hidatsa, and Arikara Nation, and his mother, Dorothy Cross, was a Norwegian homesteader.

The Cross family was forced to relocate to Parshall, North Dakota after the construction of the Garrison Dam flooded nine Indian communities, including Elbowoods, under hundreds of feet of water, forming Lake Sakakawea. Cross’ father spent years lobbying Congress to stop the construction of the dam and later waged an unsuccessful effort to secure just compensation for the Three Affiliated Tribes.

After the Indian Relocation Act fractured the family, Cross was sent to live in Santa Clara, California for his early high school years. With the encouragement of his guidance counselor at Santa Clara High School, he applied and was accepted to Stanford University. He secured a scholarship from the Bureau of Indian Affairs and graduated in 1970 with a bachelor's degree in political science. He earned his Juris Doctor in 1973 from Yale Law School and was admitted to the California Bar.

== Career ==
=== California Indian Legal Services (C.I.L.S.) ===
Cross began his legal career in 1973 as a staff attorney with California Indian Legal Services in its Mendocino County office located in Ukiah, California.

=== Native American Rights Fund (NARF) ===
Cross served from 1975 through 1980 as the Indian Law Support Center Director for the Native American Rights Fund.

During his tenure at the Native American Rights Fund, Cross represented the Klamath Indian Tribe in its successful litigation effort to establish its federally-protected water rights for the preservation of the tribe's aboriginal hunting, fishing, gathering, and trapping practices within the Klamath Marsh region of south central Oregon. He also represented the Pascua Yaqui Tribe in its successful effort to secure federal recognition of its aboriginal status as an American Indian tribe entitled to federal protection and services.

=== Mandan, Hidatsa, and Arikara Nation ===
Cross returned to the Fort Berthold Indian Reservation in 1981 to serve as tribal attorney for his people, the Mandan, Hidatsa, and Arikara Nation. He represented his tribe in two U.S. Supreme Court cases, Three Affiliated Tribes v. Wold Engineering 467 U.S. 138 and Three Affiliated Tribes v. Wold Engineering 476 U.S. 877, in which he successfully argued that state courts be opened to tribal damage actions against non-Indian defendants and reaffirmed fundamental principles of tribal sovereign immunity established in Supreme Court Chief Justice John Marshall’s Trust Doctrine.

He also took on the cause of his father, Martin Cross, in representing his tribal people in their long standing just compensation claim against the United States for its 1949 taking of over 156,000 acres of reservation land as the site for the Garrison Dam, the world's fourth largest rolled earth dam. Cross spent eight years lobbying Congress, and in 1992, Congress awarded the Mandan, Hidatsa, and Arikara Nation over $149 million in just compensation for wrongs imposed on the tribal people by the Garrison Dam.

Due to these legal victories, Cross was named a Bush Foundation fellow at the Harvard Kennedy School where he earned a Master of Public Administration and met his wife, Kathleen Cross (née Johnston).

=== Academia ===
Cross served on the faculty of the California Polytechnic State University from 1990 through 1993 and at the University of Montana from 1993 to 2015 as an expert on American Indian and environmental law.

Cross has authored numerous works on American Indian law interpretation and environmental law.

In addition to his own writing, Cross’ legal career is chronicled in the books “Coyote Warrior: One Man, Three Tribes and the Trial That Forged a Nation” and “Savages and Scoundrels” by Paul Vandevelder.

== Personal life ==
Ray married Kathleen Cross (née Johnston), his Harvard Kennedy School classmate, in 1989. They had a daughter, Helena Cross, and son, Cade Cross.

== Death ==
Ray died on January 24, 2023, at his home in Tucson, Arizona, following complications from a spinal cord tumor. His family was at his bedside.

Ray was preceded in death by his parents, Martin Cross and Dorothy Cross; siblings, Phyllis Cross, Martin Cross, Jr., Marilyn Hudson, Mike Cross, and Forrest Cross.

The immediate family celebrated Ray's life privately with a scattering of ashes at Prayer Rock on the family's Yellow Eagle ranch in North Dakota in the summer of 2023.

The obituary published in the Missoulian on January 28, 2023, read, "In honor of Ray, go forward with courage, kind words and good deeds."
