= Juanita Helphrey =

American community leader

- Maaodagabagi Oxhaadish
- Born: March 2, 1941; North Dakota, U.S.
- Died: January 5, 2018 (aged 76); Minot, North Dakota, U.S.
- Other names: White Flower, Juanita Boyd-Helphrey
- Occupations: Community leader, churchworker

Juanita Jean Smith Boyd Helphrey (March 2, 1941 – January 5, 2018), also known as Maaodagabagi Oxhaadish or White Flower, was a Native American community leader, a member of the Mandan, Hidatsa and Arikara Nation, active in the work of the United Church of Christ denomination. She was executive director of the Indian Affairs Commission of North Dakota, and of the Council for American Indian Ministries (CAIM).

== Early life and education ==
Boyd was born and raised on the Fort Berthold Indian Reservation, the daughter of Samuel Boyd and Frances L. Smith Boyd. She was born into the Alkali Lodge Clan of the Hidatsa. Her father was a farm agent and her mother was a social worker. She attended Dickinson State College and Mary College in North Dakota, and the University of California, San Diego.

== Career ==
Helphrey was the first assistant director of the Council for American Indian Ministries (CAIM), from 1971 to 1975. She was executive director of the North Dakota Indian Affairs Commission from 1975 to 1990. She spoke at community events, made reports about legislation, promoted educational programs, wrote letters to government agencies, and represented North Dakota at the International Women's Year event in Houston in 1977. She was a member of the Peace Pipe Indian Center for Bismarck-Mandan.

Helphrey was a member of the national staff of the United Church of Christ from 1991 to 2004. In 1997, after several years of protests, she and Vernon Bellecourt were arrested while burning an effigy of the Chief Wahoo mascot of the Cleveland Indians baseball team. The charges were later dismissed. In 2000, she was part of Indigenous Peoples' Day events in Cleveland.

From 2004 to 2006, she was executive director of CAIM. She wrote liturgical materials, including prayers and poems, based in her knowledge of Hidatsa traditions. Beginning in 2007, Helphrey was a Congregational pastor at Fort Berthold, and she wrote a history of Congregational churches at Fort Berthold. She was an invited attendee at Barack Obama's 2009 inauguration.

== Personal life ==
Boyd married David Helphrey in 1969. She had five sons. She competed in women's horseshoes contests in Bismarck. She died in 2018, at the age of 76, at a rehabilitation facility in Minot, North Dakota.
