= Mandan =

Native American tribe of the Great Plains

Nų́ʔetaare
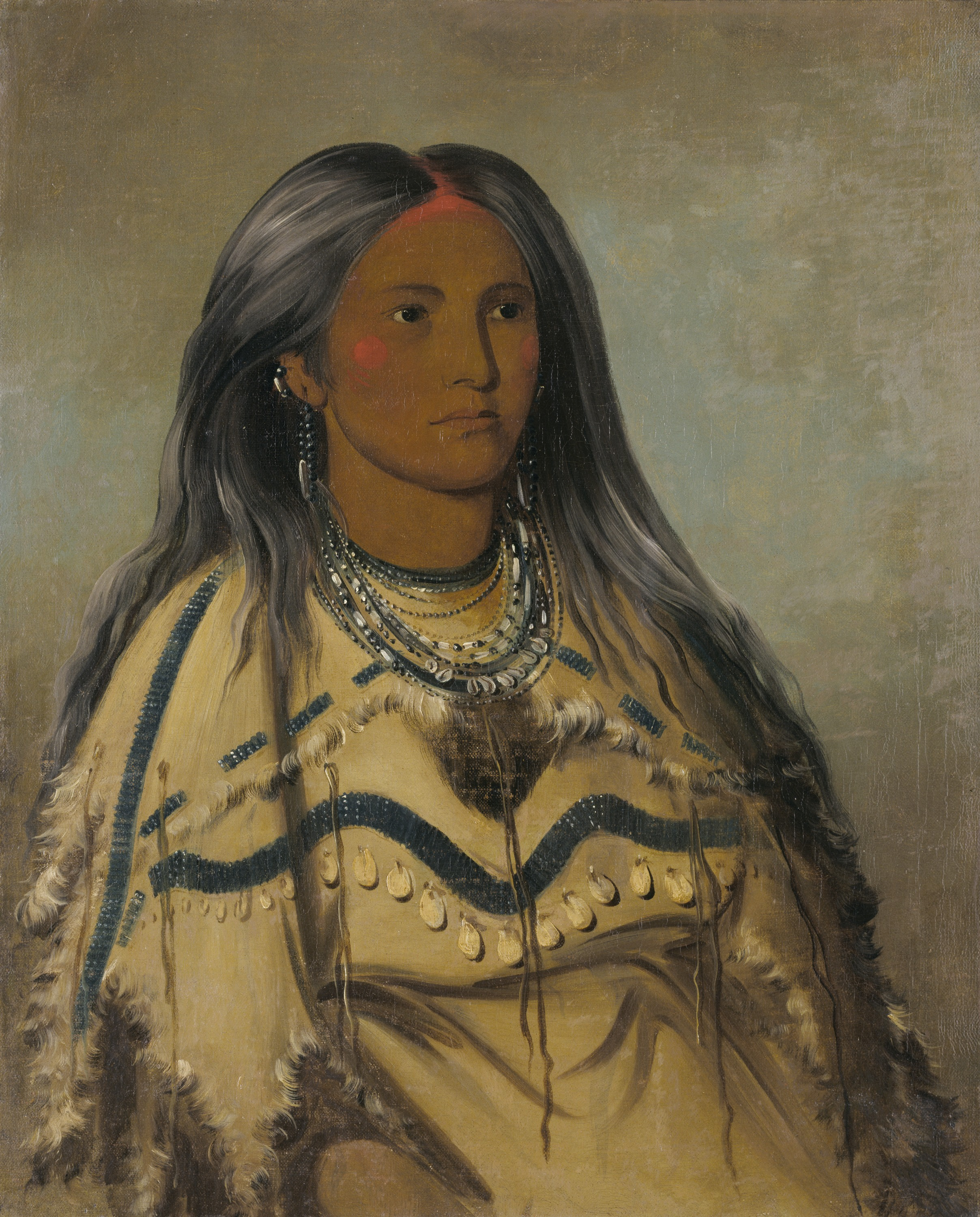
- Portrait of Sha-kó-ka, a Mandan girl, by George Catlin, 1832

Total population
- 1,171 (2010)

Regions with significant populations
- United States (North Dakota)

Languages
- English • Hidatsa • formerly Mandan

Related ethnic groups
- Hidatsa, Arikara

- Person: Núu'etaa numá'k
- People: Núu'etaare
- Language: Núu'etaa íroo
- Country: Núu'etaa Máa'ąke

The Mandan (/ˈmæn.dæn/, Mandan: Nų́ʔetaare) are a Native American tribe of the Great Plains who have lived for centuries primarily in what is now North Dakota. They are enrolled in the Three Affiliated Tribes of the Fort Berthold Reservation. About half of the Mandan still reside in the area of the reservation; the rest reside around the United States and in Canada.

The Mandan historically lived along both banks of the Upper Missouri River and two of its tributaries—the Heart and Knife rivers—in present-day North and South Dakota. Speakers of Mandan, a Siouan-Catawban language, they developed a settled, agrarian culture. They established permanent villages featuring large, round, earth lodges, some 40 feet (12 m) in diameter, surrounding a central plaza. Matrilineal families lived in the lodges. The Mandan were a great trading nation, trading especially their large corn surpluses with other tribes in exchange for bison meat and fat. Food was the primary item, but they also traded for horses, guns, and other trade goods.

== Population ==
The Mandan population was 3,600 in the early 18th century. It is estimated to have been 10,000–15,000 before European encounter. Decimated by a widespread smallpox epidemic in 1781, the people had to abandon several villages, and remnants of the Hidatsa also gathered with them in a reduced number of villages. In 1836, there were more than 1,600 full-blood Mandans but, following another smallpox epidemic in 1836–37, this number was estimated to have dropped to 125 by 1838.

In the 20th century, the people began to recover. In the 1990s, 6,000 people were enrolled in the Three Affiliated Tribes. In the 2010 Census, 1,171 people reported Mandan ancestry. Some 365 of them identified as full-bloods, and 806 had partial Mandan ancestry.

== Etymology ==
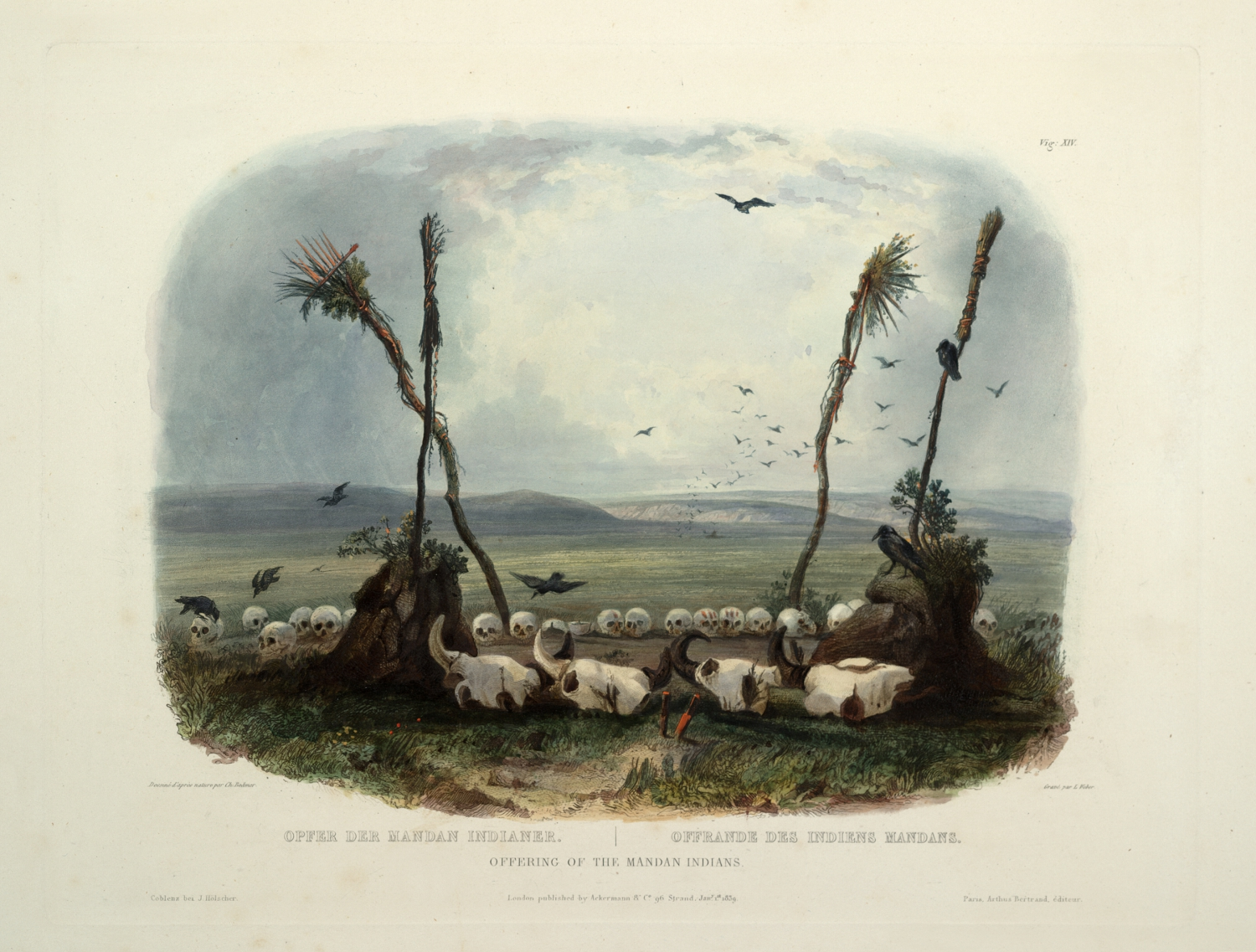
Offering of the Mandan Indians, aquatint by Karl Bodmer

The English name Mandan is derived from the French-Canadian explorer Pierre Gaultier, Sieur de la Verendrye, who in 1738 heard it as Mantannes from his Assiniboine guides, which call the Mandan Mayádąna. He had previously heard the earth lodge peoples referred to by the Cree as Ouachipouennes, "the Sioux who go underground". The Assiniboine are Siouan speakers. Nearby tribes had exonyms similar to Mantannes in their languages, for instance, Teton Miwáthaŋni or Miwátąni, Yanktonai Miwátani, Yankton Mawátani or Mąwátanį, Dakota Mawátąna or Mawátadą, etc.

The Mandan have used differing autonyms to refer to themselves: Numakaki (Nųmą́khų́·ki) (or Rųwą́ʔka·ki) ("many men, people") was inclusive and not limited to a specific village or band. This name was used before the smallpox epidemic of 1837–1838. Nueta (Nų́ʔetaa), the name used after this epidemic ("ourselves, our people") was originally the name of Mandan villagers living on the west bank of the Missouri River.

The Mandan probably used Nųmą́khų́·ki / Rųwą́ʔka·ki to refer to a general tribal entity. Later, this word fell to disuse and instead two divisions' names were used, Nuweta or Ruptare (i.e., Mandan Nų́ʔetaa or Rų́ʔeta). Later, the term Nų́ʔetaa / Rų́ʔeta was extended to refer to a general tribal entity. The name Mi-ah´ta-nēs recorded by Ferdinand Vandeveer Hayden in 1862 reportedly means "people on the river bank", but this may be a folk etymology.

Various other terms and alternate spellings that occur in the literature include: Mayátana, Mayátani, Mąwádanį, Mąwádąδį, Huatanis, Mandani, Wahtani, Mantannes, Mantons, Mendanne, Mandanne, Mandians, Maw-dân, Meandans, les Mandals, Me-too´-ta-häk, Numakshi, Rųwą́'kši, Wíhwatann, Mevatan, Mevataneo. Gloria Jahoda in Trail of Tears states that they also call themselves the "Pheasant people". George Catlin said the Mandans (or See-pohs-kah-nu-mah-kah-kee, "people of the pheasants", as they call themselves)

== Language ==
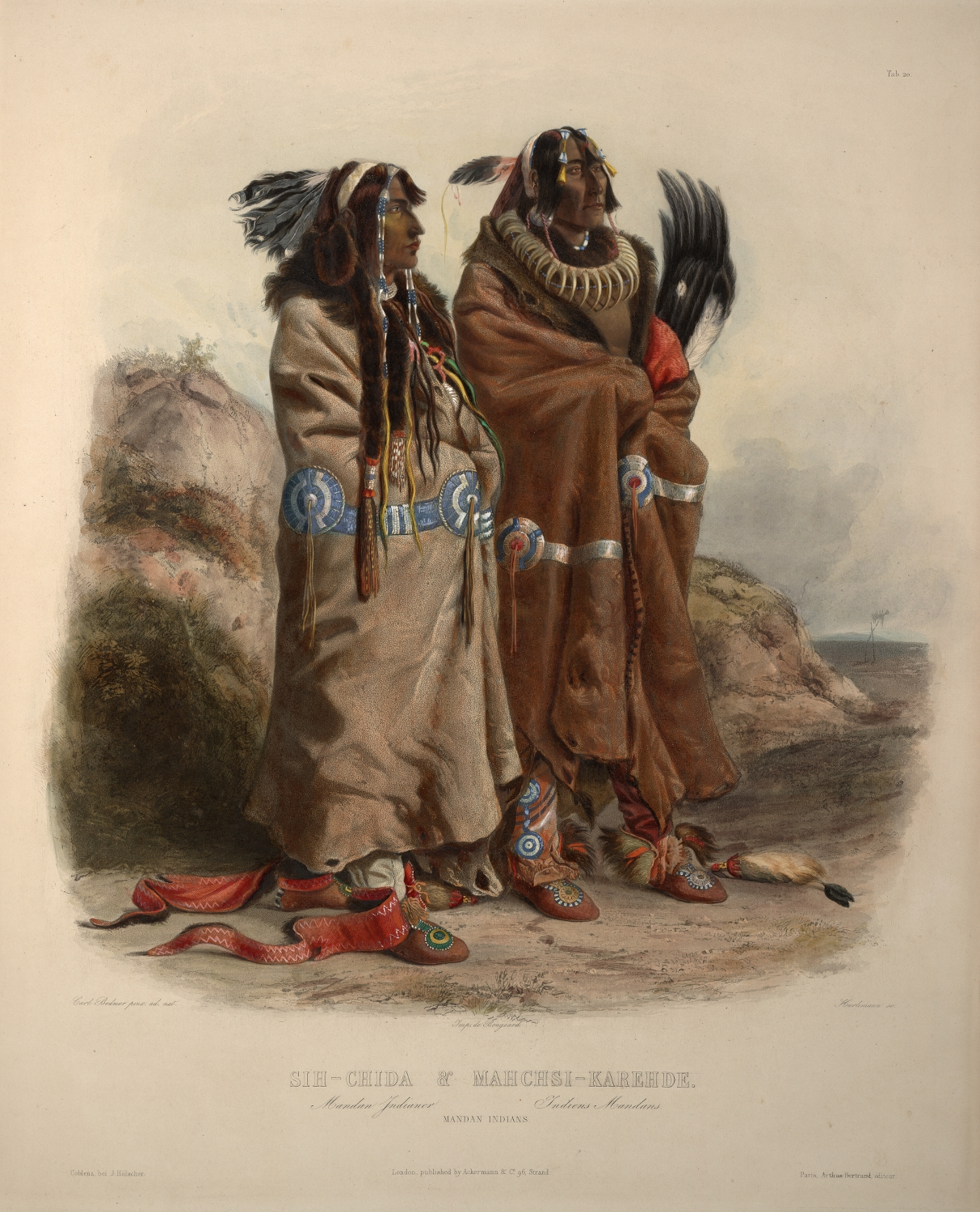
A pair of Mandan men in a print by Karl Bodmer, 19th century. Yellow Feather at left, "son of a celebrated chief". He was killed by a Sioux around a year after Bodmer painted him.

The Mandan language or Nų́ų́ʔetaa íroo belongs to the Siouan-Catawban language family. It was initially thought to be closely related to the languages of the Hidatsa and the Crow. However, since the Mandan language has been in contact with Hidatsa and Crow for many years, the exact relationship between Mandan and other Siouan languages (including Hidatsa and Crow) has been obscured. For this reason, linguists classify Mandan most often as a separate branch of the Siouan family.

Mandan has two main dialects: Nuptare and Nuetare. Only the Nuptare variety survived into the 20th century, and all speakers were bilingual in Hidatsa. Linguist Mauricio Mixco of the University of Utah has been involved in fieldwork with remaining speakers since 1993. As of 1999, there were only six fluent speakers of Mandan still alive. As of 2010, programs in local schools encourage students' learning the language.

The Mandan and their language received much attention from European Americans, in part because their lighter skin color caused speculation they were of European origin. In the 1830s, Prince Maximilian of Wied spent more time recording Mandan and additionally prepared a comparison list of Mandan and Welsh words (he thought that the Mandan may have been displaced Welsh). The theory of the Mandan–Welsh connection was also supported by George Catlin, but researchers have found no evidence of such ancestry.

Mandan has different grammatical forms that depend on the sex of the addressee. Questions asked of men must use the suffix -oʔša while the suffix -oʔrą is used when asking of women. Likewise the indicative suffix is -oʔs when addressing men and -oʔre when addressing women, and also for imperatives: -ta (male), -rą (female). Mandan, like many other North American languages, has elements of sound symbolism in their vocabulary. A /s/ sound often denotes smallness/less intensity, /ʃ/ denotes medium-ness, /x/ denotes largeness/greater intensity:

- síre "yellow"
- šíre "tawny"
- xíre "brown"
- sró "tinkle"
- xró "rattle"

== History ==
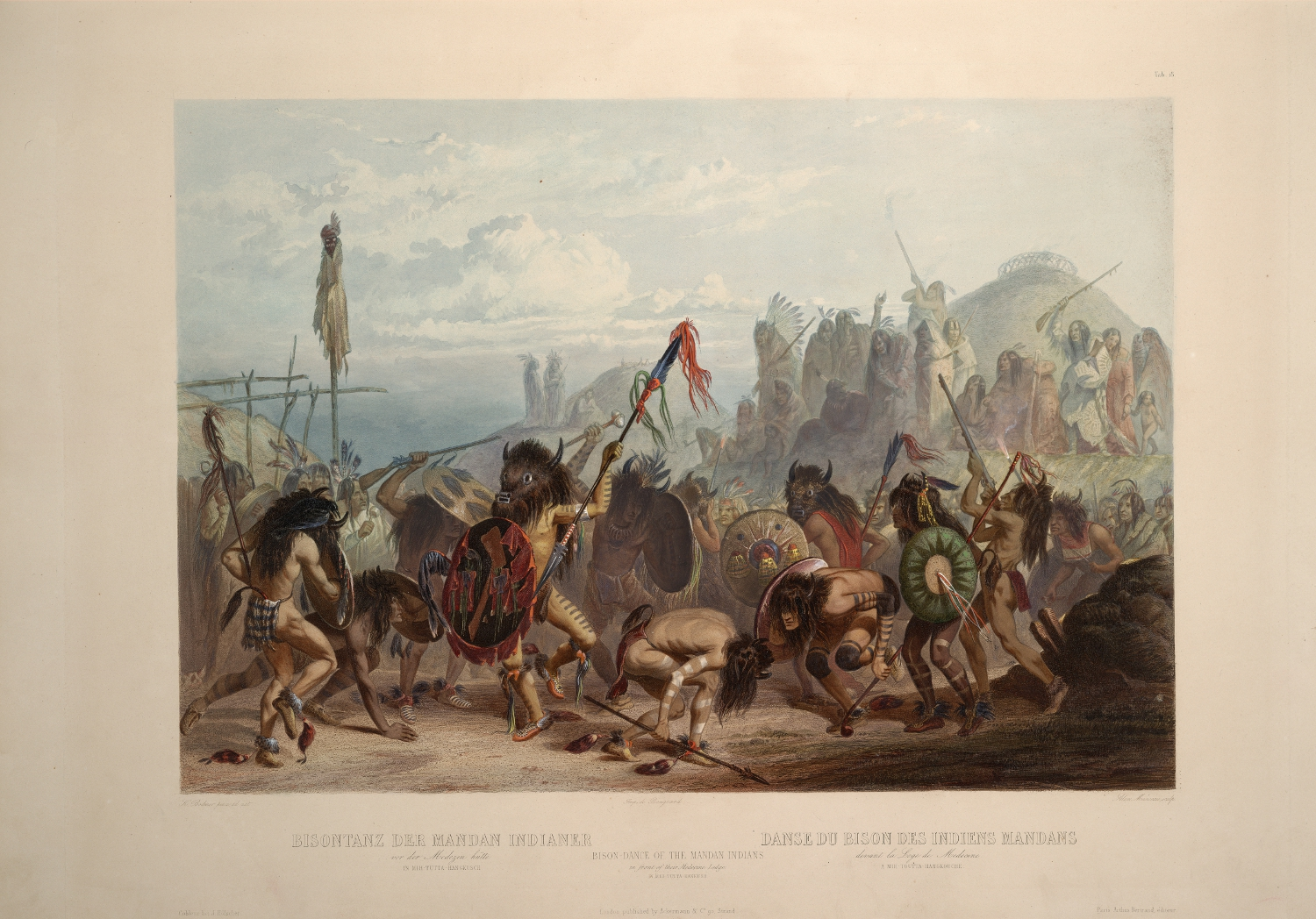
Buffalo Dance: "Bison-Dance of the Mandan Indians in front of their Medecine Lodge in Mih-Tutta-Hankush": aquatint by Karl Bodmer from the book "Maximilian, Prince of Wied's Travels in the Interior of North America, during the years 1832–1834"

=== Origins and early history ===
The exact origins and early history of the Mandan are unknown. Early studies by linguists gave evidence that the Mandan language may have been closely related to the language of the Ho-Chunk or Winnebago people of present-day Wisconsin. Scholars theorize the Mandans' ancestors may have settled in the Wisconsin area at one time. This idea is possibly confirmed in their oral history, which refers to their having come from an eastern location near a lake.

Some Ethnologists and scholars studying the Mandan subscribe to the theory that, like other Siouan-speaking people (possibly including the Hidatsa), they originated in the area of the mid-Mississippi River and the Ohio River valleys in present-day Ohio. If this was the case, the Mandan would have migrated north into the Missouri River Valley and its tributary the Heart River in present-day North Dakota. That is where Europeans first encountered the historical tribe. This migration is believed to have occurred possibly as early as the 7th century but probably between 1000 CE and the 13th century, after the cultivation of maize was adopted. It was a period of a major climatic shift, creating warmer, wetter conditions that favored their agricultural production.

After their arrival on the banks of the Heart River, the Mandan constructed several villages, the largest of which were at the mouth of the river. Archeological evidence and ground imaging radar have revealed changes in the defensive boundaries of these villages over time. The people built new ditches and palisades circumscribing smaller areas as their populations reduced.

What was known as Double Ditch Village was located on the east bank of the Missouri River, north of where present-day Bismarck developed. It was occupied by the Rupture Mandan for nearly 300 years. Today the site has depressions that are evidence of their lodges and smaller ones where they created cache pits to store dehydrated corn. The name comes from two defensive trenches built outside the area of the lodges. Construction of the fortifications here and at other locations along the Missouri has been found to have correlated to periods of drought, when peoples would have raided each other for food.

At some point during this time, the Hidatsa people also moved into the region. Mandan tradition states that the Hidatsa were a nomadic tribe until their encounter with the Mandan, who taught them to build stationary villages and cultivate agriculture. The Hidatsa continued to maintain amicable relations with the Mandan and constructed villages north of them on the Knife River.

Later the Pawnee and Arikara moved from the Republican River north along the Missouri River. They were Caddoan language speakers, and the Arikara were often early competitors with the Mandan, although both were horticulturalists. They built a settlement known as Crow Creek village on a bluff above the Missouri. The modern town of Chamberlain, South Dakota developed about eleven miles south of here.

The Mandan were divided into bands. The Nup'tadi (does not translate) was the largest linguistic group. The other bands were the Is'tope ("those who tattooed themselves"), Ma'nana'r ("those who quarreled"), Nu'itadi ("our people"), and the Awi'ka-xa / Awigaxa (does not translate). The Nup'tadi and Nu'itadi lived on both banks of the Missouri River, while the Awigaxa lived further upstream at the Painted Woods.

The bands all practiced extensive farming, which was carried out by the women, including the drying and processing of corn. The Mandan-Hidatsa settlements, called the "Marketplace of the Central Plains", were major hubs of trade in the Great Plains Indian trading networks. Crops were exchanged, along with other goods that traveled from as far as the Pacific Northwest Coast. Investigation of their sites on the northern Plains have revealed items traceable as well to the Tennessee River, Florida, the Gulf Coast, and the Atlantic Seaboard.

The Mandan gradually moved upriver, and consolidated in present-day North Dakota by the fifteenth century. From 1500 to about 1782, the Mandan reached the height of their population and influence. Their villages showed increasing densities as well as stronger fortifications, for instance at Huff Village. It had 115 large lodges with more than 1,000 residents.

The bands did not often move along the river until the late 18th century, after their populations plummeted due to smallpox and other epidemics.

=== European encounter ===
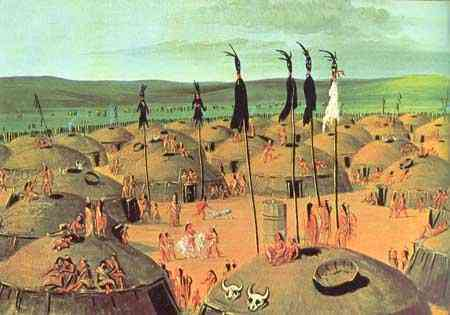
Painting of a Mandan village by George Catlin, c. 1832

The Koatiouak, mentioned in a 1736 letter by Jesuit Jean-Pierre Aulneau, are identified as Mandans. Aulneau was killed before his planned expedition to visit the Mandans could take place.

The first European known to visit the Mandan was the French Canadian trader Sieur de la Verendrye in 1738. The Mandans carried him into their village, whose location is unknown. It is estimated that at the time of his visit, 15,000 Mandan resided in the nine well-fortified villages on the Heart River; the villages held a total of 1,000 lodges. According to Vérendrye, the Mandans at that time were a large, powerful, prosperous nation who were able to dictate trade on their own terms. They traded with other Native Americans both from the north and the south, from downriver.

Horses were acquired by the Mandan in the mid-18th century from the Apache to the South. The Mandan used them both for transportation, to carry packs and pull travois, and for hunting. The horses helped with the expansion of Mandan hunting territory on to the Plains. The encounter with the French from Canada in the 18th century created a trading link between the French and Native Americans of the region; the Mandan served as middlemen in the trade in furs, horses, guns, crops, and buffalo products. Spanish merchants and officials in St. Louis (after France had ceded its territory west of the Mississippi River to Spain in 1763) explored the Missouri and strengthened relations with the Mandan (whom they called Mandanas).

They wanted to discourage trade in the region by the English and the Americans, but the Mandan carried on open trade with all competitors. They were not going to be limited by the maneuvering of the Europeans. French traders in St. Louis also sought to establish direct overland communication between Santa Fé and their city; the fur trading Chouteau brothers gained a Spanish monopoly on trade with Santa Fe.

A smallpox epidemic broke out in Mexico City in 1779/1780. It slowly spread northward through the Spanish empire, by trade and warfare, reaching the northern plains in 1781. The Comanche and Shoshone had become infected and carried the disease throughout their territory. Other warring and trading peoples also became infected. The Mandan lost so many people that the number of clans was reduced from thirteen to seven; three clan names from villages west of the Missouri were lost altogether. They eventually moved northward about 25 miles, and consolidated into two villages, one on each side of the river, as they rebuilt following the epidemic. Similarly afflicted, the much reduced Hidatsa people joined them for defense. Through and after the epidemic, they were raided by Lakota Sioux and Crow warriors.

In 1796 the Mandan were visited by the Welsh explorer John Evans, who was hoping to find proof that their language contained Welsh words. Numerous European Americans held that there were Welsh Indians in these remote areas, a persistent myth that was widely written about. Evans had arrived in St. Louis two years prior, and after being imprisoned for a year, was hired by Spanish authorities to lead an expedition to chart the upper Missouri. Evans spent the winter of 1796–97 with the Mandan but found no evidence of any Welsh influence. In July 1797 he wrote to Dr. Samuel Jones, "Thus having explored and charted the Missurie for 1,800 miles and by my Communications with the Indians this side of the Pacific Ocean from 35 to 49 degrees of Latitude, I am able to inform you that there is no such People as the Welsh Indians."

British and French Canadians from the north carried out more than twenty fur-trading expeditions down to the Hidatsa and Mandan villages in the years 1794 to 1800.

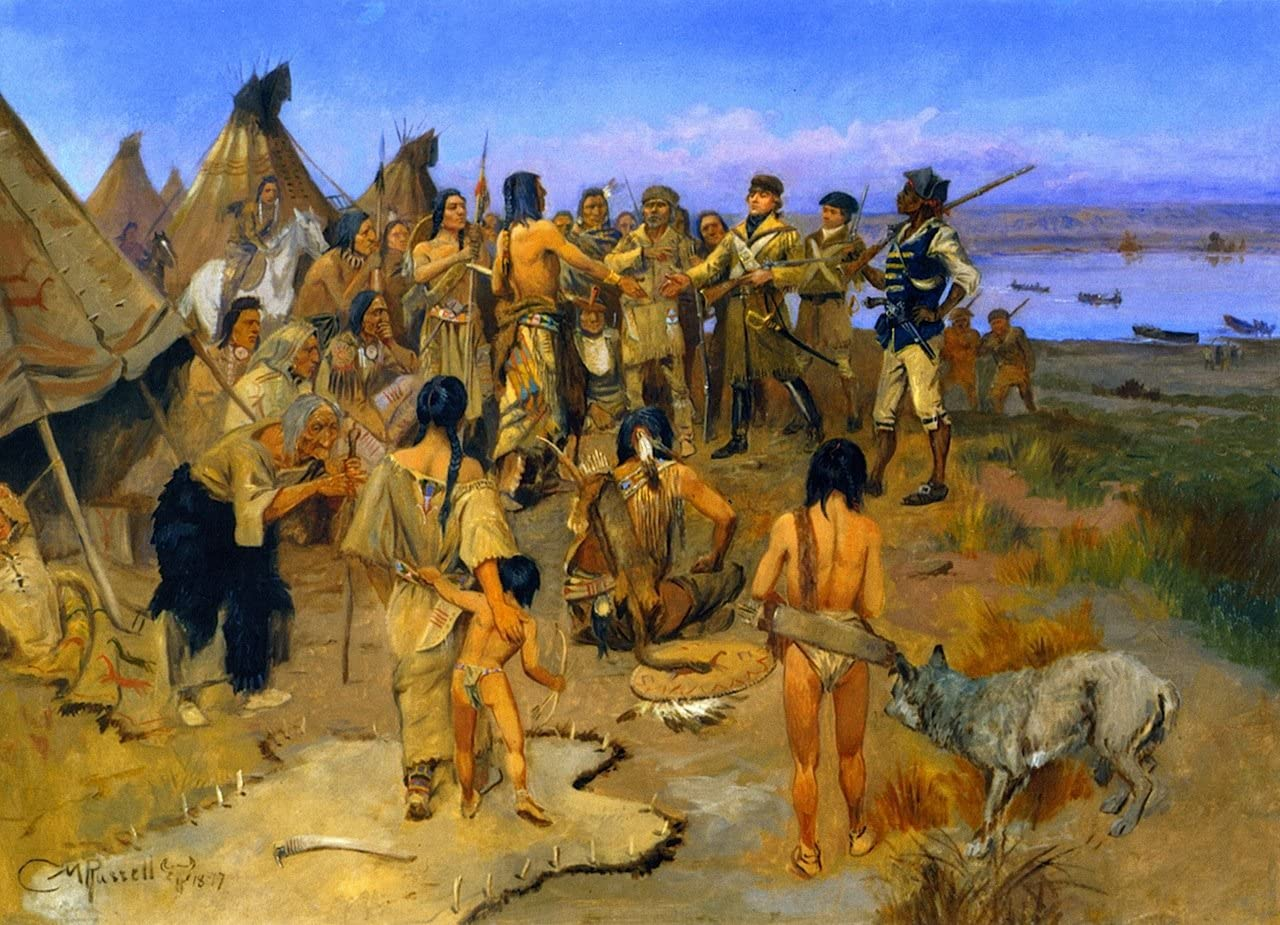
Lewis and Clark meeting the Mandan Indians, by Charles Marion Russell, 1897

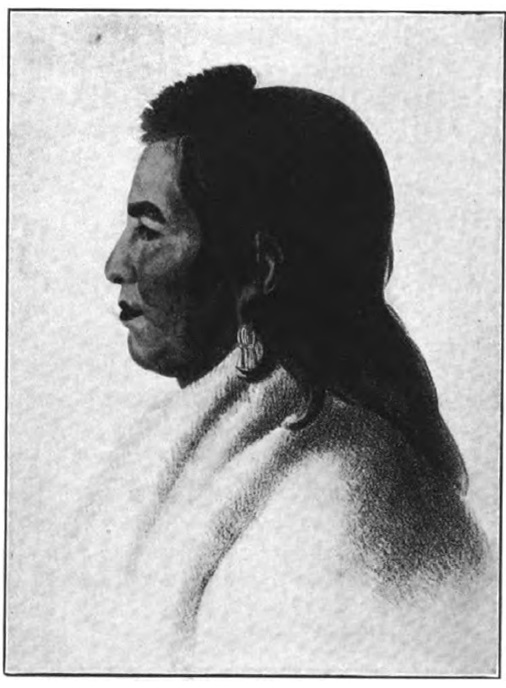
Painting of Mandan Chief Big White

By 1804 when Lewis and Clark visited the tribe, the number of Mandan had been greatly reduced by smallpox epidemics and warring bands of Assiniboine, Lakota and Arikara. (Later they joined with the Arikara in defense against the Lakota.) The nine villages had consolidated into two villages in the 1780s, one on each side of the Missouri. But they continued their famous hospitality, and the Lewis and Clark expedition stopped near their villages for the winter because of it. In honor of their hosts, the expedition dubbed the settlement they constructed Fort Mandan. It was here that Lewis and Clark first met Sacagawea, a captive Shoshone woman. Sacagawea accompanied the expedition as it traveled west, assisting them with information and translating skills as they journeyed toward the Pacific Ocean. Upon their return to the Mandan villages, Lewis and Clark took the Mandan Chief Sheheke (Coyote or Big White) with them to Washington to meet with President Thomas Jefferson. He returned to the upper Missouri. He had survived the smallpox epidemic of 1781, but in 1812 Chief Sheheke was killed in a battle with Hidatsa.

In 1825 the Mandans signed a peace treaty with the leaders of the Atkinson-O'Fallon Expedition. The treaty required that the Mandans recognize the supremacy of the United States, admit that they reside on United States territory, and relinquish all control and regulation of trade to the United States. This was in exchange for annual payments that were never received. The Mandan and the United States Army never met in open warfare.

In 1832, artist George Catlin visited the Mandan near Fort Clark. Catlin painted and drew scenes of Mandan life as well as portraits of chiefs, including Four Bears or Ma-to-toh-pe. His skill at rendering so impressed Four Bears that he invited Catlin as the first man of European descent to be allowed to watch the sacred annual Okipa ceremony. During the winter months of 1833 and 1834, Prince Maximilian of Wied-Neuwied and Swiss artist Karl Bodmer stayed with the Mandan.

==== Speculation about pre-Columbian European contact ====
18th-century reports about characteristics of Mandan lodges, religion and occasional physical features among tribal members, such as blue and grey eyes along with lighter hair coloring, stirred speculation about the possibility of pre-Columbian European contact. Catlin believed the Mandan were the "Welsh Indians" of folklore, descendants of Prince Madoc and his followers who had emigrated to America from Wales in about 1170. Rudolf Friedrich Kurz wrote that "What Catlin calls blonde hair among the Mandan is nothing more than sun-burned hair that is not continually smeared with grease.... I may mention, also, that the lighter color of some Indians' skin (not only Mandan) is easily traced to the 'whites.' The explorer David Thompson wrote that his time had "been spent in noticing their Manners and conversing about their Policy, Wars, Country, Traditions, &c &c in the Evenings I attended their Amusements of Dancing Singing &c. which were always conducted with the highest order and Decorum .. . after their Idea of thinking." but made no mention of their skin colour or any customs similar to European ones. François-Antoine Larocque visited the Crow and the Mandan. He commented on the Crow saying ""Such of them as do not make practice of exposing themselves naked to the sun have a skin nearly as white as that of white people.... most of those Indians, as they do not so often go naked, are generally of a fairer skin than most of the other tribes with which I am acquainted." He wrote nothing about the skin color of the Mandan. Professor James D. Mclaird wrote that "According to physical anthropologist Marshall T. Newman, Catlin and Kurz were both describing a kind of achromotrichia, or premature graying, a genetic trait. Newman has examined contemporary evidence carefully and discovered that this genetic trait existed in several Indian tribes, including the Mandan, and it caused streaks of blondness and premature graying of the hair." This view was popular at the time but has since been disputed by the bulk of scholarship.

Hjalmar Holand has proposed that interbreeding with Norse survivors of an expedition he thought that Paul Knutson had made looking for surviving Greenland Christians might explain the "blond" Indians among the Mandan on the Upper Missouri River. In a multidisciplinary study of the Kensington Runestone, anthropologist Alice Beck Kehoe wrote that "Knutson would have been fervent indeed to paddle thousands of miles inland searching for the apostates; Holand's hypothesis of a Knutson expedition seems only slightly less speculative than the legend of Prince Madoc." Archaeologist Ken Feder has stated that none of the material evidence that would be expected from a Viking presence in and travel through the American Midwest exists.

=== Intertribal warfare 1785-1845 ===
Sioux Indians attacked the Mandan village Nuptadi and set it on fire around 1785. The "turtles" used in the Okipa ceremony were saved. "When Nuptadi Village was burned by the Sioux ...", recounted Mandan woman Scattercorn, "... the turtles produced water which protected them ...".

The Sioux kept consolidating their dominant position on the northern plains. In the words of "Cheyenne warrior" and Lakota-allied George Bent: "... the Sioux moved to the Missouri and began raiding these two tribes, until at last the Mandans and Rees [Arikaras] hardly dared go into the plains to hunt buffalo".

The Arikara Indians were from time to time also among the foes of the Mandans. Chief Four Bears's revenge on the Arikara, who had killed his brother, is legendary.

The Mandan maintained the stockade around Mitutanka Village when threats were present.

Major fights were fought. "We destroyed fifty tepees [of Sioux]. The following summer thirty men in a war party were killed", tells the Mandan winter count of Butterfly for 1835–1836. The big war party was neutralized by Yanktonai Sioux Indians.

Mitutanka, now occupied by Arikaras as well as some Mandans, was burned by Yankton Sioux Indians on January 9, 1839. "... the small Pox last year, very near annihilated the Whole [Mandan] tribe, and the Sioux has finished the Work of destruction by burning the village".

In 1845, the Hidatsa moved some 20 miles north, crossed the Missouri and built Like-a-Fishhook Village. Many Mandans joined for common protection.

=== Smallpox epidemic of 1837–38 ===
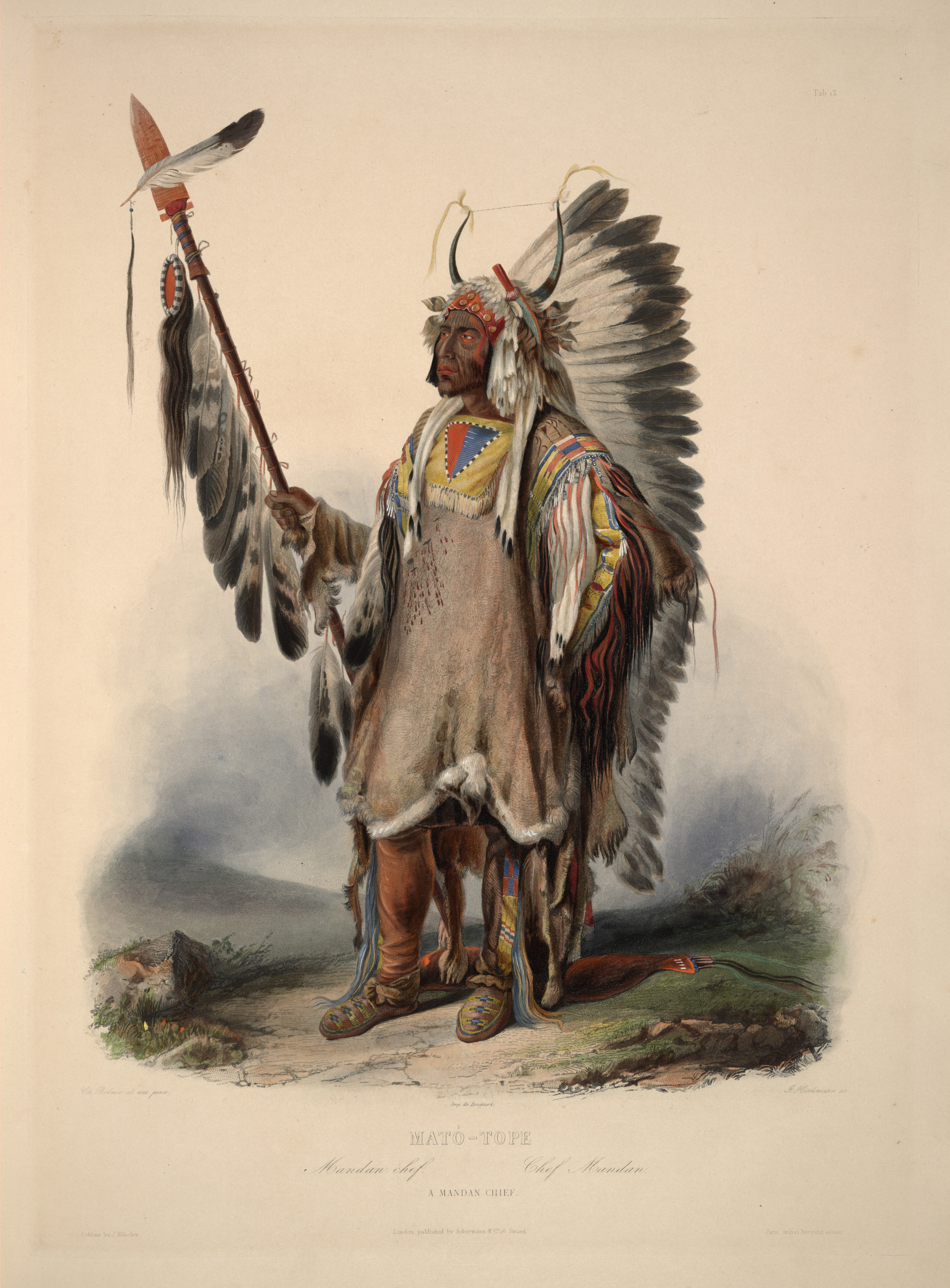
"Mató-Tope, a Mandan chief": aquatint by Karl Bodmer from the book "Maximilian, Prince of Wied's Travels in the Interior of North America, during the years 1832–1834"

The Mandan were first plagued by smallpox in the 16th century and had been hit by similar epidemics every few decades. Between 1837 and 1838, another smallpox epidemic swept the region. In June 1837, an American Fur Company steamboat traveled westward up the Missouri River from St. Louis. Its passengers and traders aboard infected the Mandan, Hidatsa and Arikara tribes. There were approximately 1,600 Mandan living in the two villages at that time. The disease killed 90% of the Mandan people, effectively destroying their settlements. Almost all of the tribe's members, including the second chief, Four Bears, died. Estimates of the number of survivors vary from 27 up to 150 persons, with some sources placing the number at 125. The survivors banded together with the nearby surviving Hidatsa in 1845 and moved upriver, where they developed Like-a-Fishhook Village.

The Mandan believed that they had been infected by whites associated with the steamboat and Fort Clark. Chief Four Bears reportedly said, while ailing, "a set of Black harted [sic] Dogs, they have deceived Me, them that I always considered as Brothers, has turned Out to be My Worst enemies". Francis Chardon, in his Journal at Fort Clark 1834–1839, wrote that the Gros Ventres (ie. Hidatsa), "swear vengeance against all the Whites, as they say the small pox was brought here by the S[team] B[oat]." (Chardon, Journal, p. 126). In the earliest detailed study of the event, in The American Fur Trade of the Far West (1902), Hiram M. Chittenden blamed the American Fur Company for the epidemic. Oral traditions of the affected tribes continue to claim that whites were to blame for the disease. R. G. Robertson in his book Rotting Face: Smallpox and the American Indian, blames Captain Pratte of the steamboat St. Peter for failing to quarantine passengers and crew once the epidemic broke out, stating that while

not guilty of premeditated genocide, but he was guilty of contributing to the deaths of thousands of innocent people. The law calls his offence criminal negligence. Yet in light of all the deaths, the almost complete annihilation of the Mandans, and the terrible suffering the region endured, the label criminal negligence is benign, hardly befitting an action that had such horrendous consequences.

Some scholars who have argued that the transmission of smallpox to Native Americans during the 1836-40 epidemic was intentional, including Ann F. Ramenofsky who asserted in 1987: "Variola Major can be transmitted through contaminated articles such as clothing or blankets. In the nineteenth century, the U.S. Army sent contaminated blankets to Native Americans, especially Plains groups, to control the Indian problem." The Commissioner of Indian Affairs had refused to send the vaccine to the Mandans, apparently not thinking them worthy of protection.

Some accounts repeat a story that an Indian sneaked aboard the St. Peter and stole a blanket from an infected passenger, thus starting the epidemic. The many variations of this account have been criticized by both historians and contemporaries as fiction, a fabrication intended to assuage the guilt of white settlers for displacing the Indians. "The blanket affair was created afterward and is not to be credited", notes B. A. Mann. Given trade and travel patterns, there were numerous ways for people to have been infected, as they had been in earlier, also severe, epidemics.

=== Late-19th and 20th centuries ===
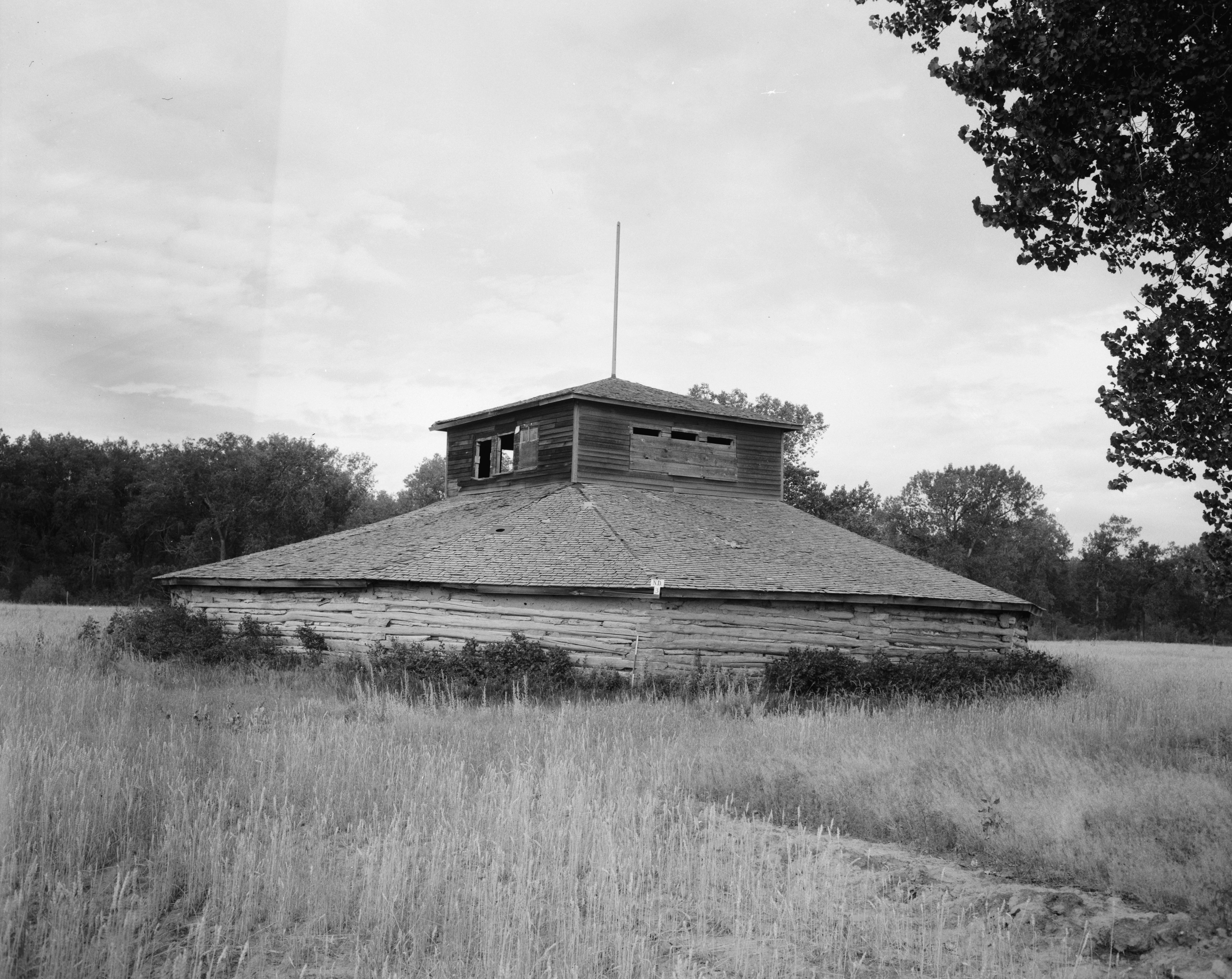
Dance lodge from the Elbowoods area on the Fort Berthold Reservation. Built in 1923, this is a wooden version of the classic Mandan earthwork lodge. This area was flooded in 1951. From the Historic American Engineering Record collection, Library of Congress.

The Mandan were a party in the Fort Laramie Treaty of 1851. They shared a mutual treaty area north of Heart River with the Hidatsa and the Arikara.

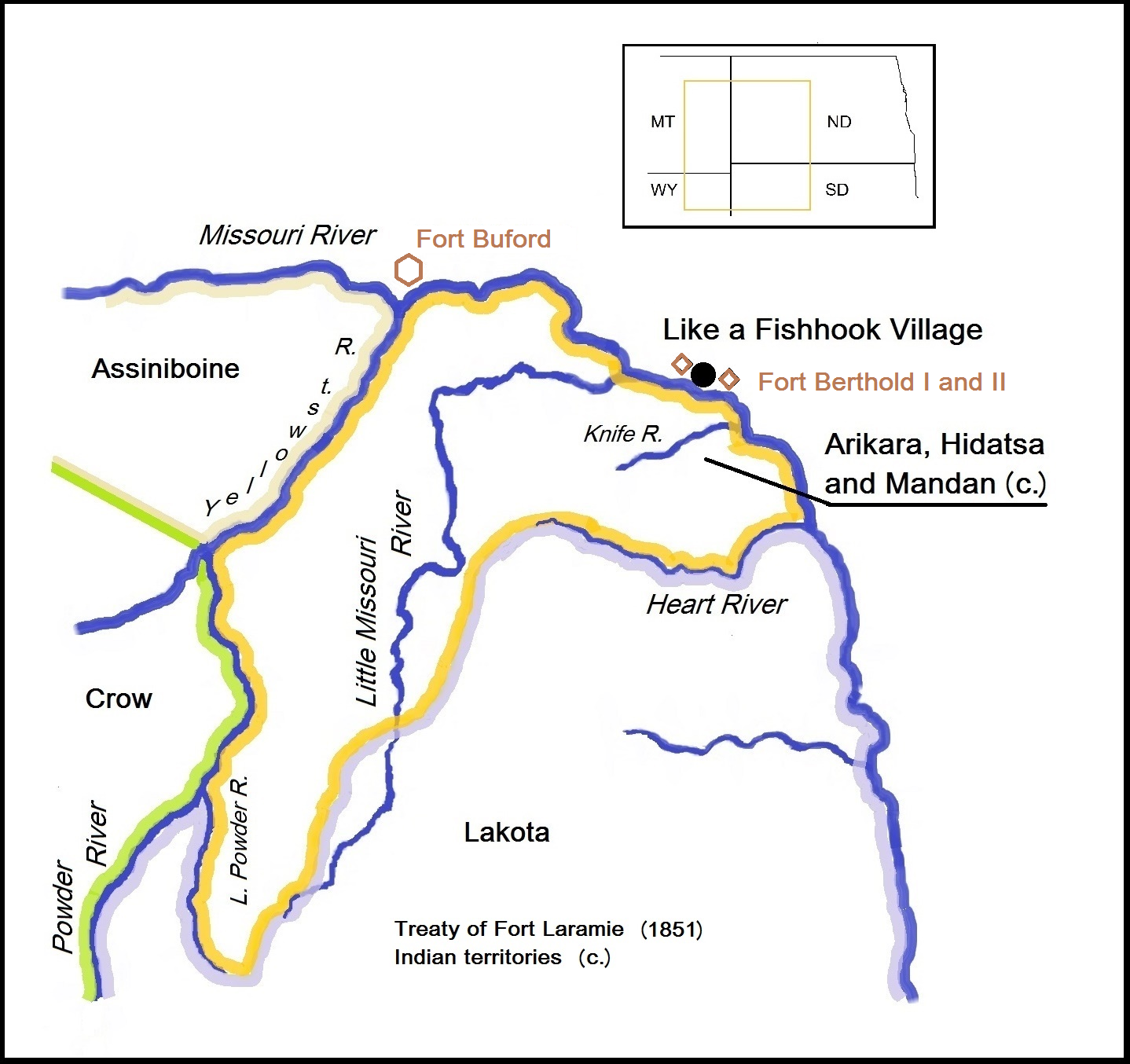
Arikara, Hidatsa and Mandan Indian territory, 1851. Like-a-Fishhook Village, Fort Berthold I and II, and military post Fort Buford, North Dakota.

Soon attacks on hunting parties by Lakota and other Sioux made it difficult for the Mandan to be safe in the treaty area. The tribes called for the United States Army to intervene, and they would routinely ask for such aid until the end of Lakota primacy. Despite the treaty, the Mandan received little protection from US forces.

In the summer of 1862, the Arikara joined the Mandan and Hidatsa in Like-a-Fishhook Village on the upper Missouri. All three tribes were forced to live outside their treaty area south of the Missouri by the frequent raiding of Lakota and other Sioux. Before the end of 1862, some Sioux Indians set fire to part of a Like-a-Fishhook Village.

In June 1874, there "was a big war" near Like-a-Fishhook-Village. Colonel George Armstrong Custer failed to cut off a large war party of Lakota that was attacking the Mandan, although "... the Mandans should be protected same as white settlers". Five Arikaras and a Mandan were killed by the Lakota. The attack turned out to be one of the last made by the Lakota on the Three Tribes.

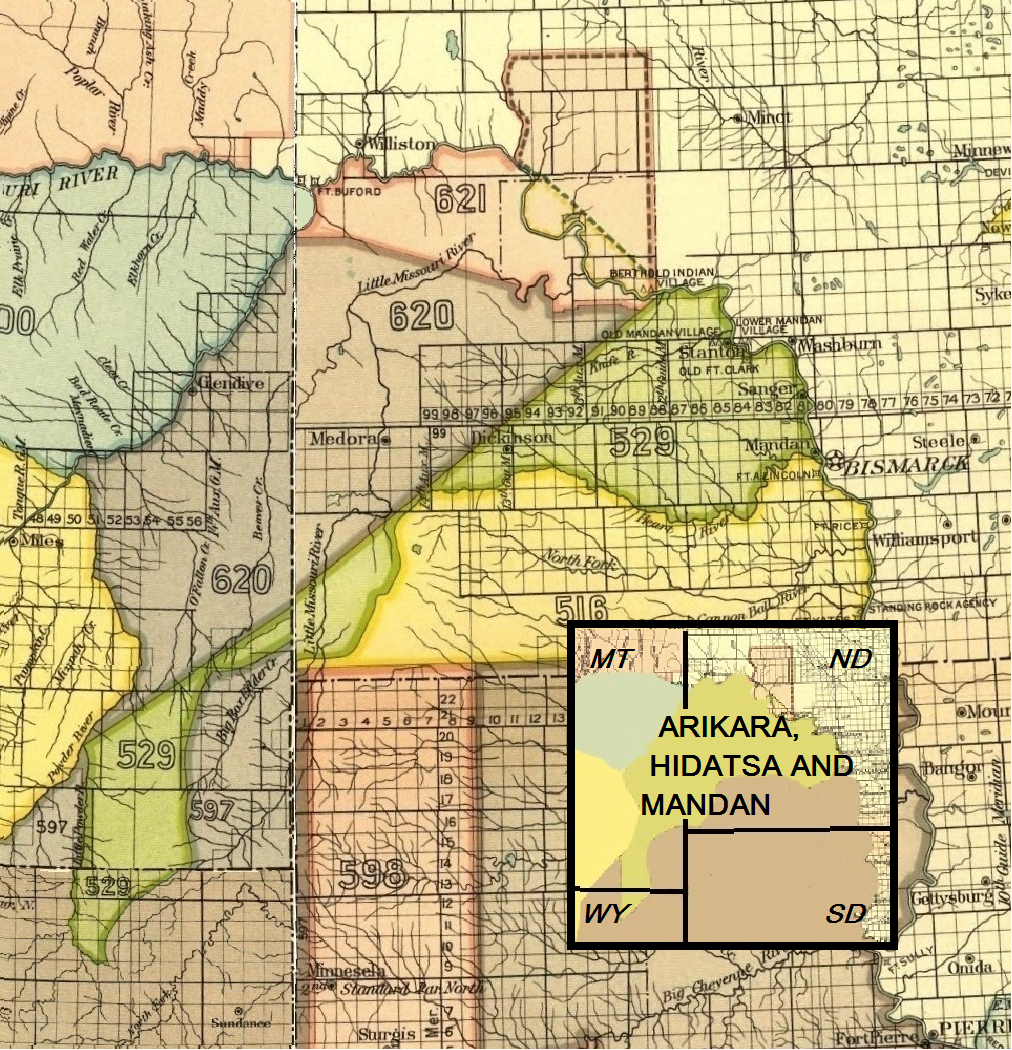
Arikara, Hidatsa and Mandan 1851 treaty territory. (Area 529, 620 and 621 south of the Missouri). Fort Berthold Indian Reservation included land both south and north of the Missouri (the light pink area). The acreage of the reservation was reduced later.

The Mandan joined with the Arikara in 1862. By this time, Like-a-Fishhook Village had become a major center of trade in the region. By the 1880s, though, the village was abandoned. In the second half of the 19th century, the Three Affiliated Tribes (the Mandan, Hidatsa and Arikara) gradually lost control of some of their holdings. The Fort Laramie Treaty of 1851 recognized 12 million acres (49,000 km^{2}) of land in the territory owned jointly by these tribes. With the creation of the Fort Berthold Reservation by Executive Order on April 12, 1870, the federal government acknowledged only that the Three Affiliated Tribes held 8 million acres (32,000 km^{2}). On July 1, 1880, another executive order deprived the tribes of 7 million acres (28,000 km^{2}) of land lying outside the boundaries of the reservation.

=== 20th century to present ===
In the early 20th century, the government seized more land; by 1910, the reservation was reduced to 900,000 acres (3,600 km^{2}). This land is located in Dunn, McKenzie, McLean, Mercer, Mountrail and Ward counties in North Dakota.

Under the 1934 Indian Reorganization Act, which encouraged tribes to restore their governments, the Mandan officially merged with the Hidatsa and the Arikara. They drafted a constitution to elect representative government and formed the federally recognized Three Affiliated Tribes, known as the Mandan, Hidatsa and Arikara Nation.

In 1951, the U.S. Army Corps of Engineers began construction of Garrison Dam on the Missouri River. Developed for flood control and irrigation, this dam created Lake Sakakawea. It flooded portions of the Fort Berthold Reservation, including the villages of Fort Berthold and Elbowoods, as well as a number of other villages. The former residents of these villages were moved and New Town was constructed for them.

While New Town was constructed for the displaced tribal members, much damage was done to the social and economic foundations of the reservation by the loss of flooded areas. The flooding claimed approximately one quarter of the reservation's land. This land contained some of the most fertile agricultural areas upon which their economy had been developed. The Mandan did not have other land that was as fertile or viable for agriculture. In addition, the flooding claimed the sites of historic villages and archaeological sites with sacred meaning for the peoples.

== Culture ==
=== Lodges and villages ===
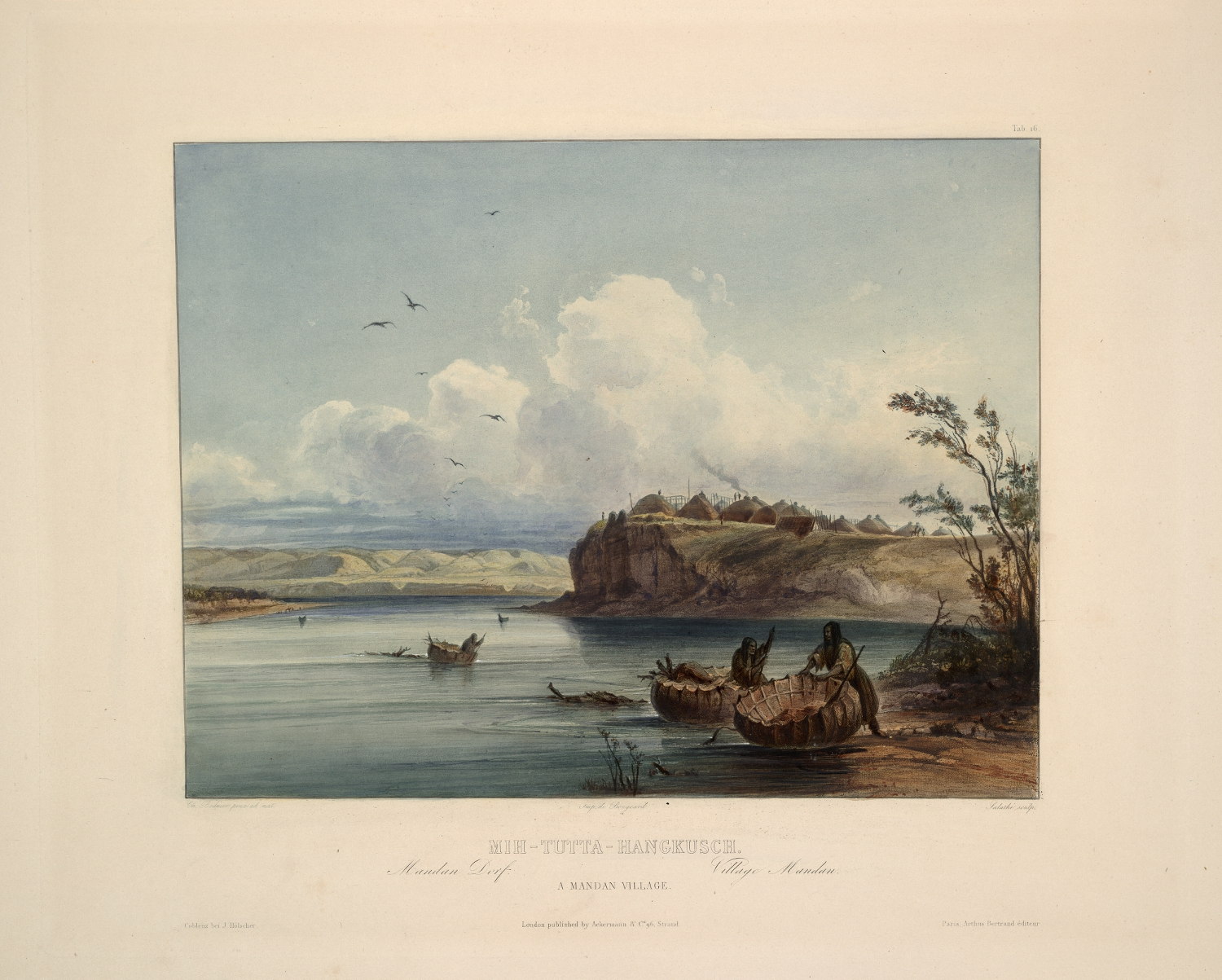
"Mih-Tutta-Hangkusch, a Mandan village": aquatint by Karl Bodmer from the book Maximilian, Prince of Wied's Travels in the Interior of North America, during the years 1832–1834. The name of the village is usually spelled "Mitutanka" now. Located on the west bank of the Missouri River, it was burned by Yankton Sioux Indians in 1839.

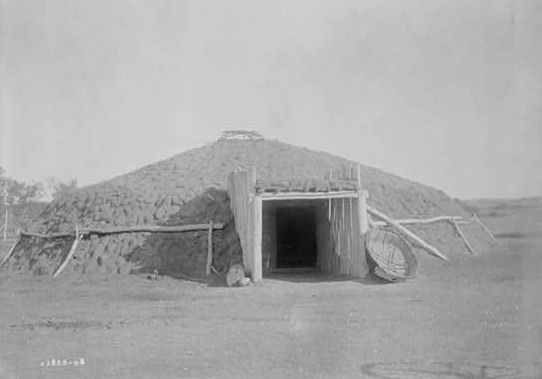
Mandan earth lodge, photographed by Edward S. Curtis, circa 1908

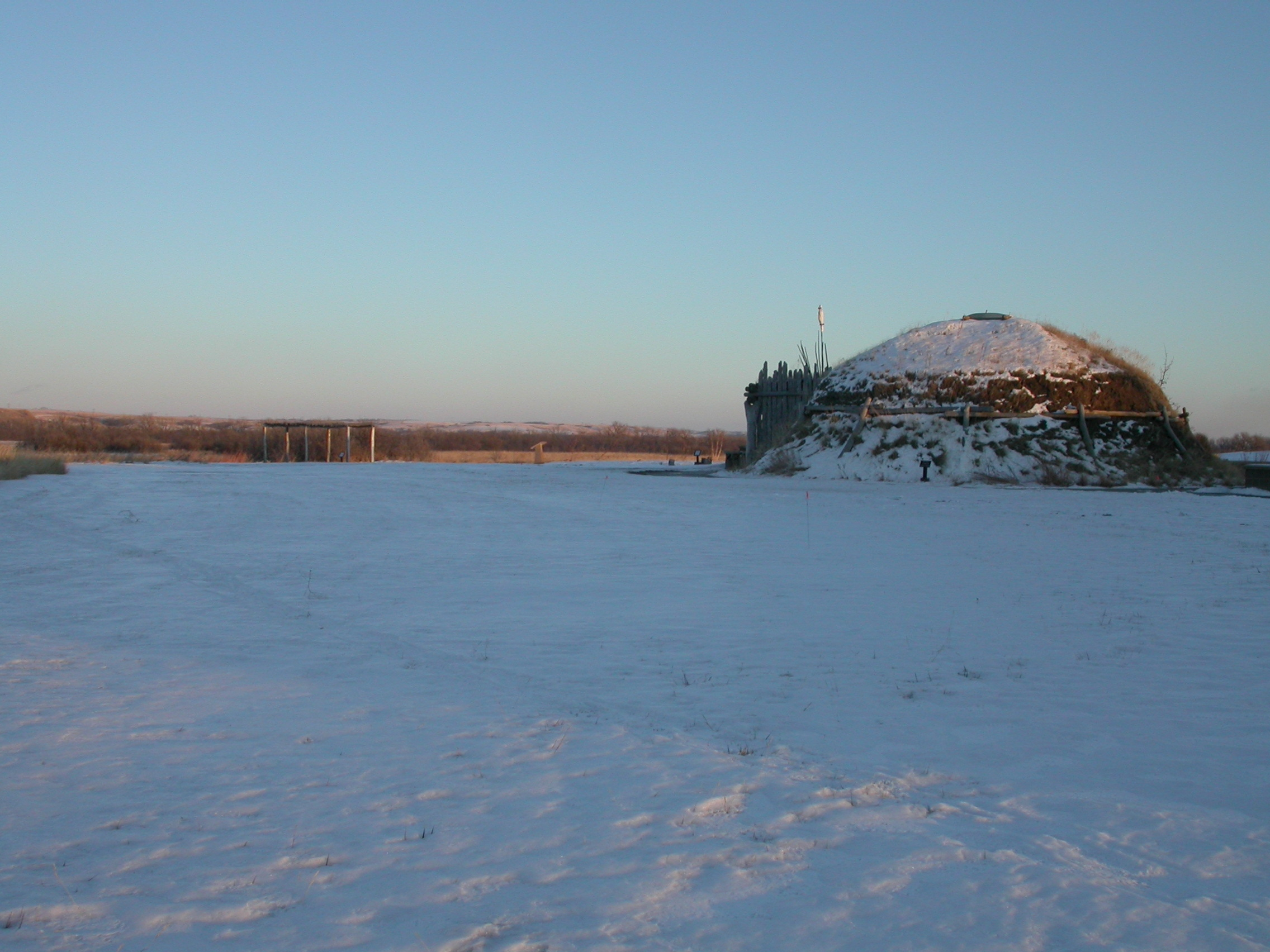
Snow scene of a modern reconstructed earth lodge at the Knife River Indian Villages National Historic Site, North Dakota

The Mandan were known for their distinctive, large, circular earthen lodges, in which more than one family lived. Their permanent villages were composed of these lodges. Constructed and maintained by women, each lodge was circular with a dome-like roof and a square hole at the apex of the dome through which smoke could escape. Four pillars supported the frame of the lodge. Wood timbers were placed against these, and the exterior was covered with a matting made from reeds and twigs and then covered with hay and earth, which protected the interior from rain, heat and cold. It was sturdy enough so that numerous adults and children could sit on the top of the lodge. The lodge also featured an extended portico-type structure at the entrance, to provide protection from cold and other weather.

The interior was constructed around four large pillars, upon which crossbeams supported the roof. These lodges were designed, built and owned by the women of the tribe, and ownership was passed through the female line. Generally 40 feet (12 m) in diameter, they could hold several families, up to 30 or 40 people, who were related through the elder women. When a young man married, he moved to his wife's lodge, which she shared with her mother and sisters. Villages usually had around 120 lodges. Reconstructions of these lodges may be seen at Fort Abraham Lincoln State Park near Mandan, North Dakota, and the Knife River Indian Villages National Historic Site.

Originally lodges were rectangular, but around 1500 CE, lodges began to be constructed in a circular form. Toward the end of the 19th century, the Mandan began constructing small log cabins, usually with two rooms. When traveling or hunting, the Mandan would use skin tipis. Today, the Mandan live in modern dwellings.

Villages were usually oriented around a central plaza that was used for games (chunkey) and ceremonial purposes. In the center of the plaza was a cedar tree surrounded by a vertical wood enclosure. The shrine represented the "Lone Man", one of the main figures in Mandan religion. He was said to have built a wooden corral that saved the people of a village from a flooding river in North Dakota. Villages were often situated on high bluffs above the river. Often, villages would be constructed at the meeting of tributaries, in order to use the water as a natural barrier. Where there were few or no natural barriers, the villages built some type of fortification, including ditches and wooden palisades.

=== Family life ===
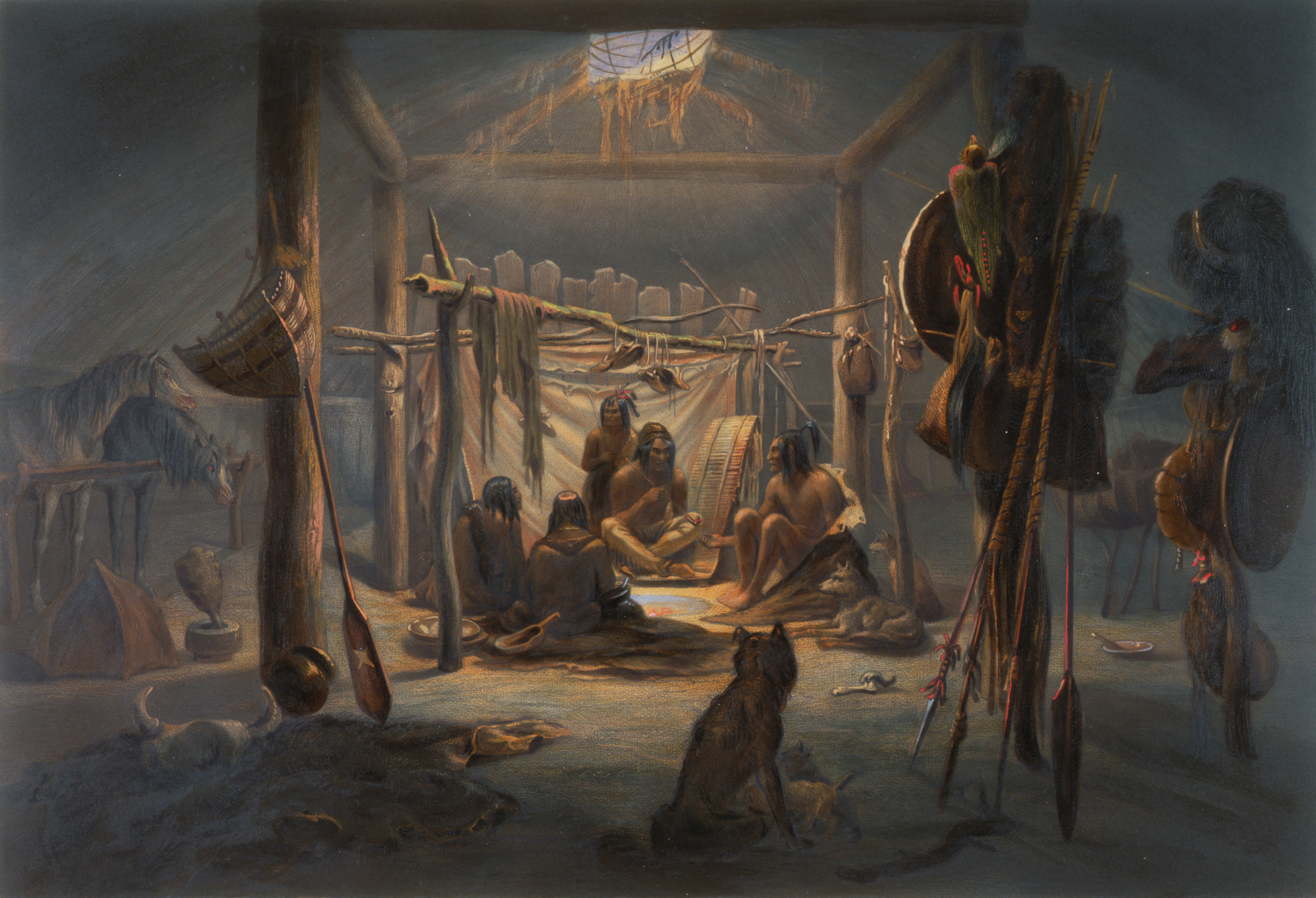
"The interior of the hut of a Mandan Chief": aquatint by Karl Bodmer from the book "Maximilian, Prince of Wied's Travels in the Interior of North America, during the years 1832–1834"

The Mandan were originally divided into thirteen clans, which were reduced to seven by 1781, due to population losses in the smallpox epidemic. Ninety percent of the population died in the 1837-1838 smallpox epidemic. By 1950 only four clans survived.

Historically clans organized around successful hunters and their kin. Each clan was expected to care for its own, including orphans and the elderly, from birth to death. The dead were traditionally cared for by their father's clan. Clans held a sacred or medicine bundle, which consisted of a few gathered objects believed to hold sacred powers. Those in possession of the bundles were considered to have sacred powers bestowed to them by the spirits and thus were considered the leaders of the clan and tribe. In historic times, the medicine bundles could be purchased, along with knowledge of the rites and rights associated with them, and then inherited by offspring.

Children were named ten days after their birth in a ceremony that officially linked the child with its family and clan. Girls were taught domestic skills, especially cultivation and processing of maize and other plants, preparation, tanning and processing of skins and meats, needlework and quillwork, and how to build and keep a home. Boys were taught hunting and fishing. The boys began fasting for religious visions at the age of ten or eleven. Marriage among the Mandan was generally arranged by members of one's own clan, especially uncles; although, occasionally it would take place without the approval of the couple's parents. Divorce could be easily obtained.

Upon the death of a family member, the father and his people would erect a scaffold near the village to contain the body. The body would be placed with the head toward the northwest and feet to the southeast. Southeast is the direction of the Ohio River Valley, from which the Mandan came. The Mandan would not sleep in this orientation, because it invited death. After a ceremony to send the spirit away, the family would mourn at the scaffold for four days. After the body rotted and the scaffold collapsed, the bones would be gathered up and buried, except for the skull, which was placed in a circle near the village. Family members would visit the skulls and talk to them, sometimes bearing their problems or regaling the dead with jokes. After the Mandan moved to the Fort Berthold Reservation, they resorted to placing the bodies in boxes or trunks, or wrapped them in fur robes and placed them in rocky crevices.

=== Mandan economy ===
Mandan food came from farming, hunting, gathering wild plants, and trade. Corn was the primary crop, and part of the surplus was traded with nomadic tribes for bison meat. Mandan gardens were often located near river banks, where annual flooding would leave the most fertile soil, sometimes in locations miles from villages. Women owned and tended the gardens, where they planted several varieties of corn, beans and squash. Sunflowers were planted first in early April. As early as the fifteenth century, the Mandan town Huff had enough storage pits to store seventy thousand bushels of corn.

Hunting the buffalo was a critical part of Mandan survival and rituals. They called the buffalo to "come to the village" in the Buffalo Dance ceremony at the beginning of each summer. In addition to eating the meat, the Mandan used all parts of the buffalo, so nothing went to waste. 'Float bison', which accidentally fell or were driven into the river, were considered a Mandan delicacy and the meat was eaten when half-rotten. The hides were used for bull boat construction, buffalo-fur robes or were tanned, the leather used for clothing, bags, shelter and other purposes. The Mandan were known for their painted buffalo hides that often recorded historic events. The bones would be carved into items such as needles and fish hooks. Bones were also used in farming: for instance, the scapula was used as a hoe-like device for breaking the soil. The Mandan also trapped small mammals for food and hunted deer. Deer antlers were used to create rake-like implements used in farming. Birds were hunted for meat and feathers, the latter used for adornment. Archaeological evidence shows that the Mandan also ate fish.

The Mandan and neighboring Hidatsa villages were key centers of trade on the Northern plains. The Mandan sometimes traded far from home but more often nomadic plains peoples travelled to the upper Missouri villages to trade. For example William Clark in the winter of 1804 documented the arrival of thousands of Assiniboine Indians as well as Cree and Cheyenne to trade. The Mandan bartered corn in exchange for dried bison meat. The Mandan also exchanged horses with the Assiniboine in exchange for arms, ammunition and European products. Clark noted that the Mandan obtained horses and leather tents from peoples to the west and southwest such as Crows, Cheyennes, Kiowas and Arapahos.

=== Dress ===
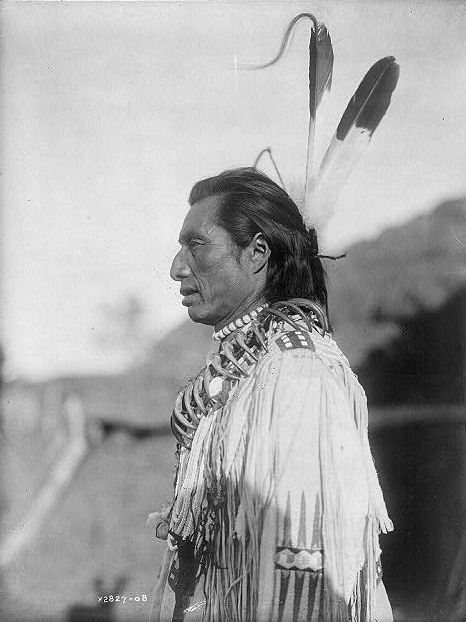
Crow's Heart, a Mandan, wearing a traditional deerhide tunic, photo by Edward Curtis, c. 1908

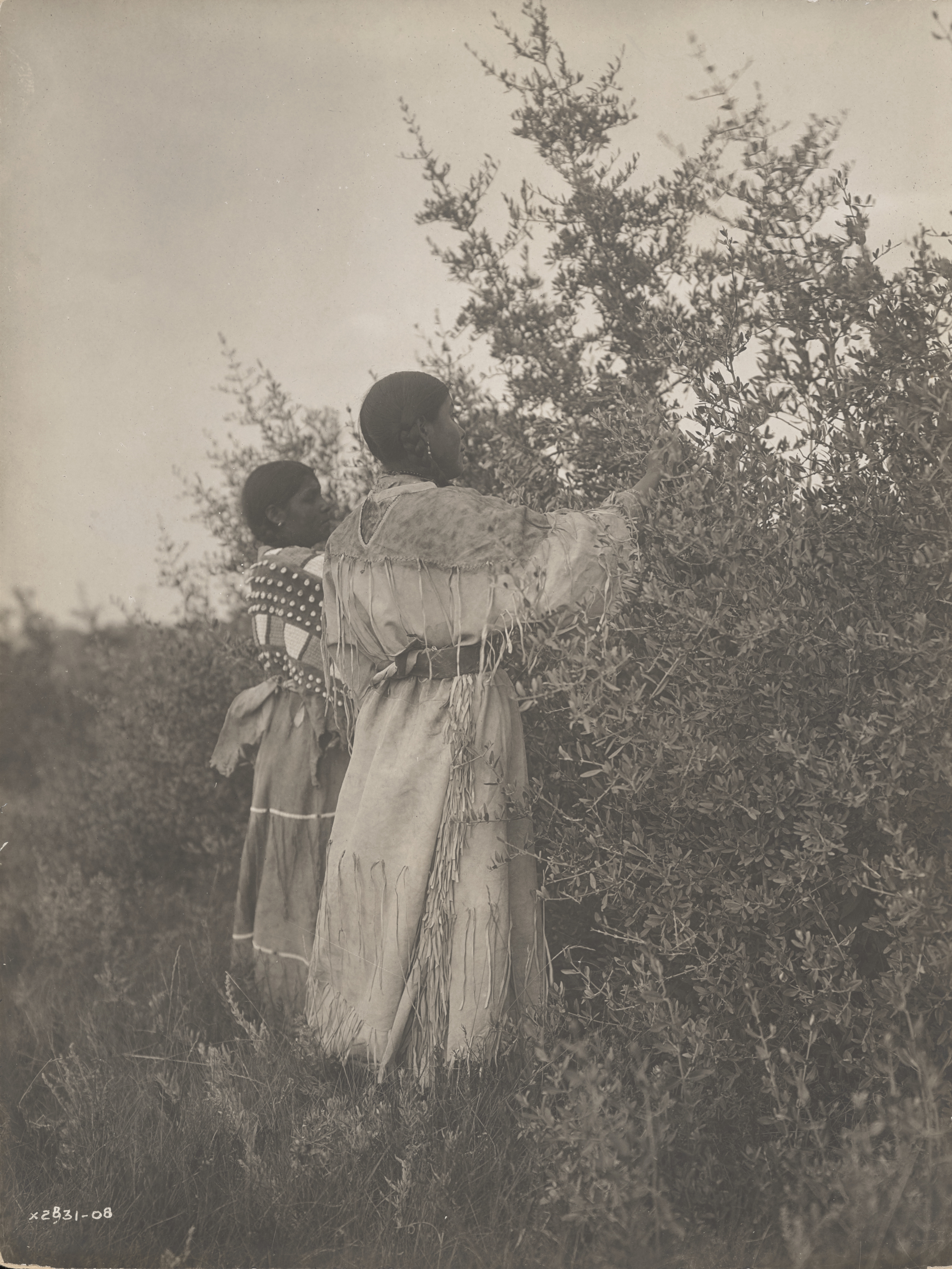
Mandan girls gathering berries, photo by Edward Curtis, c. 1908

Up until the late 19th century, when Mandan people began adopting Western-style dress, they commonly wore clothing made from the hides of buffalo, as well as of deer and sheep. From the hides, tunics, dresses, buffalo-fur robes, moccasins, gloves, loincloths and leggings could be made. These items were often ornamented with quills and bird feathers, and men sometimes wore the scalps of enemies.

Mandan women wore ankle-length dresses made of deerskin or sheepskin. This would often be girded at the waist with a wide belt. Sometimes the hem of the dress would be ornamented with pieces of buffalo hoof. Underneath the dress, they wore leather leggings with ankle-high moccasins. Women's hair was worn straight down in braids.

During the winter months, men would commonly wear deerskin tunics and leggings with moccasins. They also kept themselves warm by wearing a robe of buffalo fur. During the summer months, however, they often wore only a loincloth of deerskin or sheepskin. Unlike the women, men would wear various ornaments in their hair. The hair was parted across the top with three sections hanging down in front. Sometimes the hair would hang down the nose and would be curled upwards with a curling stick. The hair would hang to the shoulders on the side, and the back portion would sometimes reach to the waist. The long hair in the back would create a tail-like feature, as it would be gathered into braids then smeared with clay and spruce gum, and tied with cords of deerskin. Headdresses of feathers were often worn as well. Besides buffalo, elk, and deer hides, the Mandan also used ermine and white weasel hides for clothing.

Today, Mandan people wear traditionally inspired clothing and regalia at powwows, ceremonies, and other significant events.

=== Religion ===
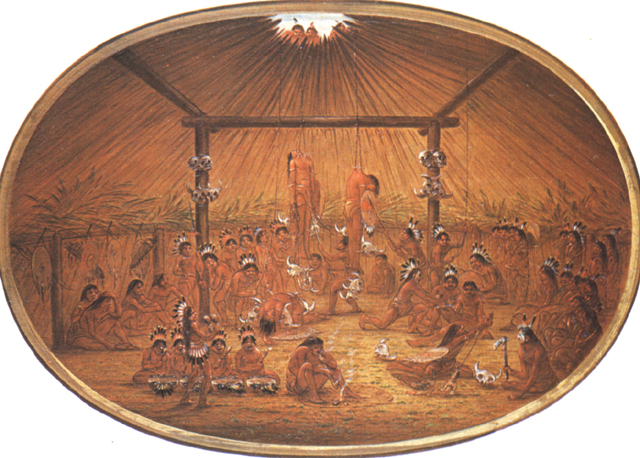
The Okipa ceremony as witnessed by George Catlin in 1832.

The Mandan's religion and cosmology was highly complex and centered around the figure known as Lone Man. Lone Man was involved in many of the creation myths as well as one of the flood myths.

In their creation myth, the world was created by two rival deities, the First Creator and the Lone Man. The Missouri River divided the two worlds that the beings created. First Creator created the lands to the south of the river with hills, valleys, trees, buffalo, pronghorn antelope and snakes. To the north of the river, Lone Man created the Great Plains, domesticated animals, birds, fish and humans. The first humans lived underground near a large lake. Some of the more adventurous humans climbed a grapevine to the surface and discovered the two worlds. After returning underground, they shared their findings and decided to return with many others. As they were climbing the grapevine, it broke and half the Mandan were left underground.

According to Mandan beliefs, each person possessed four different, immortal souls. The first soul was white and often seen as a shooting star or meteor. The second soul was colored a light brown and was seen in the form of the meadowlark. The third soul, called the lodge spirit, remained at the site of the lodge after death and would remain there forever. The final soul was black and after death would travel away from the village. These final souls existed as did living people; residing in their own villages, and farming and hunting.

The Okipa ceremony was a major part of Mandan religious life. This complex ceremony related to the creation of the earth was first recorded by George Catlin. A man would volunteer to be the Okipa Maker, and sponsor the preparations and foods needed. Preparations took much of a year, as there were days of events, when crowds were hosted.

The ceremony opened with a Bison Dance, to call the buffalo to the people. It was followed by a variety of torturous ordeals through which warriors proved their physical courage and gained the approval of the spirits. The Okipa began with the young men not eating, drinking, or sleeping for four days. Then they were led to a hut, where they had to sit with smiling faces while the skin of their chest and shoulders was slit and wooden skewers were thrust behind the muscles. With the skewers tied to ropes and supporting the weight of their bodies, the warriors would be suspended from the roof of the lodge and would hang there until they fainted. To add agony, heavy weights or buffalo skulls were added to the initiates' legs. After fainting, the warriors would be pulled down and the men (women were not allowed to attend this ceremony) would watch them until they awoke, proving the spirits' approval. Upon awakening, the warriors would offer the left little finger to the Great Spirit, whereupon a masked tribesman would sever it with a hatchet blow. Finally, participants would endure a grueling race around the village called "the last race", until the thongs tied to the buffalo skulls ripped out of their skin.

Those finishing the ceremony were seen as being honored by the spirits; those completing the ceremony twice would gain everlasting fame among the tribe. Chief Four Bears, or Ma-to-toh-pe, completed this ceremony twice. The last Okipa ceremony was performed in 1889, but the ceremony was resurrected in a somewhat different form in 1983. The version of the Okipa as practiced by the Lakota may be seen in the 1970 film A Man Called Horse starring Richard Harris.

=== Present day ===
The Mandan and the two culturally related tribes, the Hidatsa and Arikara, while being combined have intermarried but do maintain, as a whole, the varied traditions of their ancestors.

They constructed the Four Bears Casino and Lodge in 1993, attracting tourists and generating gaming and employment income for the impoverished reservation.

The most recent addition to the New Town area has been the new Four Bears Bridge, which was built in a joint effort between the three tribes and the North Dakota Department of Transportation. The bridge, spanning the Missouri River, replaces an older Four Bears Bridge that was built in 1955. The new bridge—the largest bridge in the state of North Dakota—is decorated with medallions celebrating the cultures of the three tribes. The bridge was opened to traffic September 2, 2005, and was officially opened in a ceremony on October 3.

== Image gallery ==
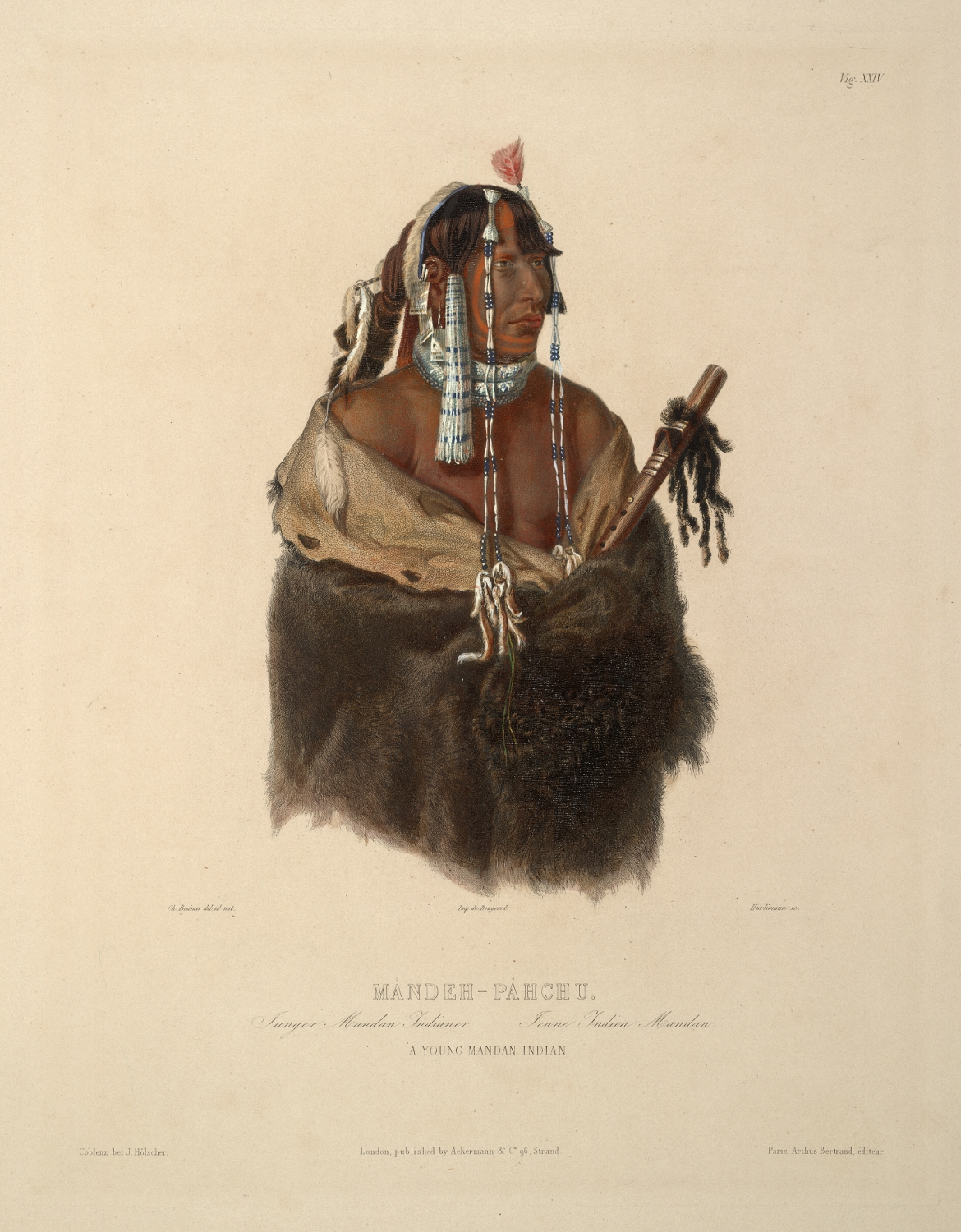
"Mändeh-Páhchu, A young Mandan Indian": aquatint by Karl Bodmer from the book "Maximilian, Prince of Wied's Travels in the Interior of North America, during the years 1832–1834"

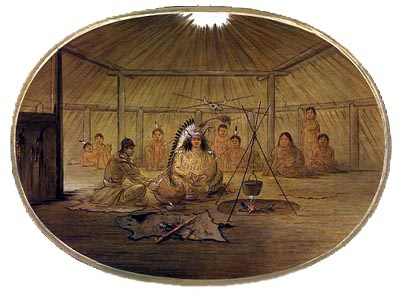
A feast inside a Mandan lodge, art by George Catlin, showing the four pillars supporting the roof and the smoke hole, c. 1830

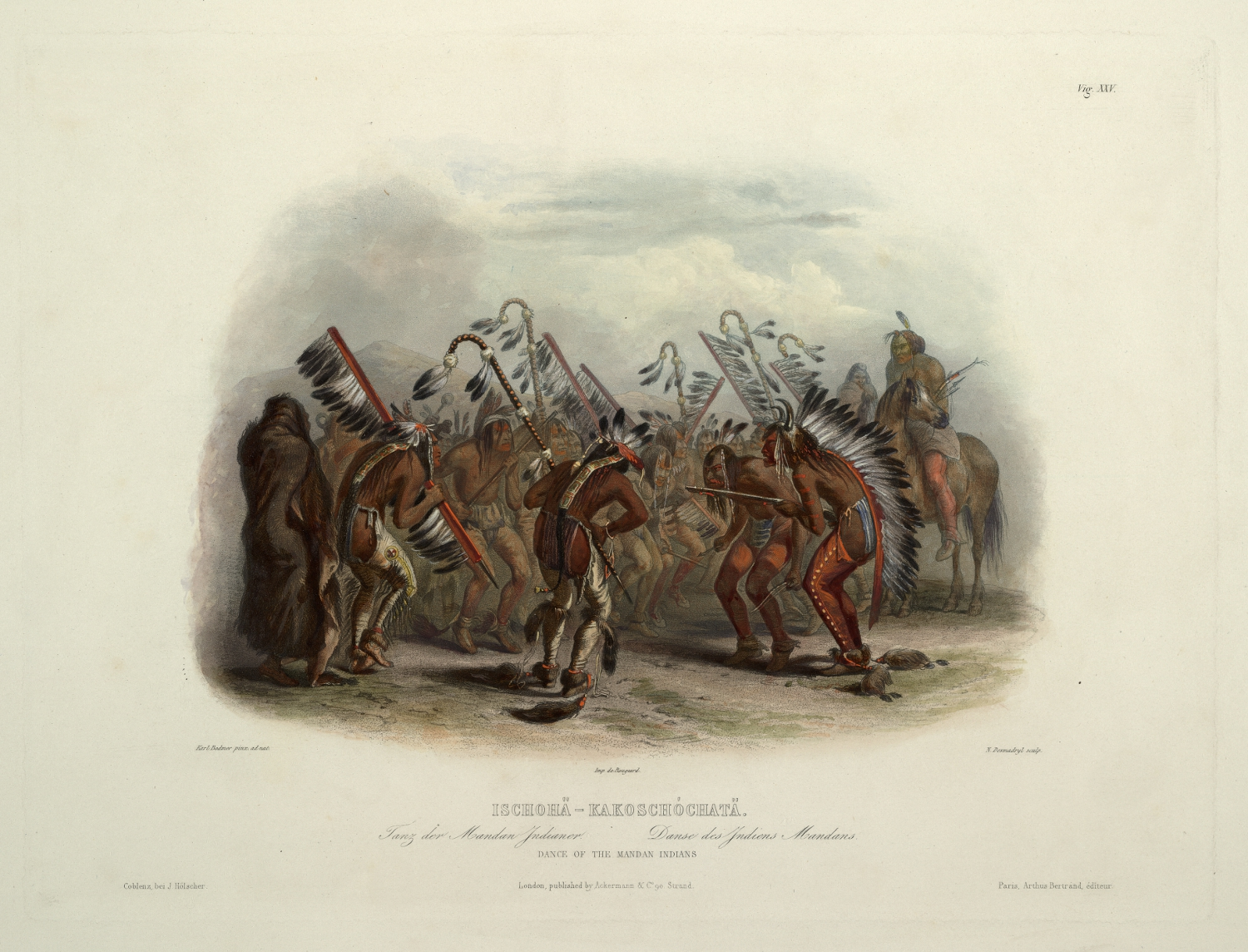
"Ischohä-Kakoschóchatä, Dance of the Mandan Indians": aquatint by Karl Bodmer from the book "Maximilian, Prince of Wied's Travels in the Interior of North America, during the years 1832–1834"

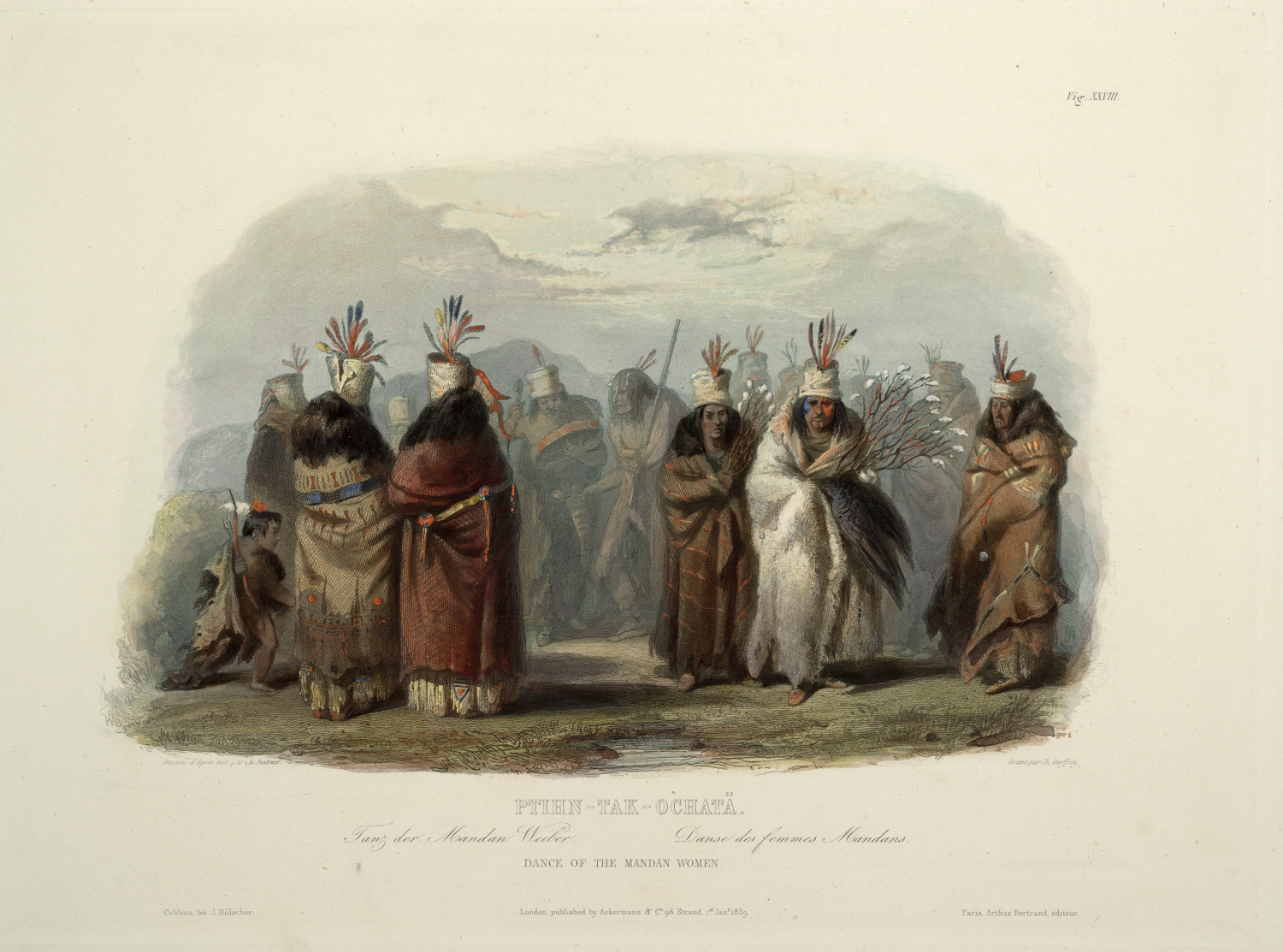
"Ptihn-Tak-Ochatä, dance of the Mandan Women": aquatint by Karl Bodmer from the book "Maximilian, Prince of Wied's Travels in the Interior of North America, during the years 1832–1834"

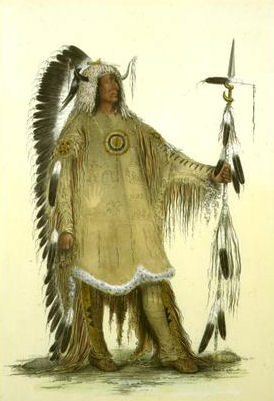
Mandan Chief Ma-to-toh-pe or Four Bears, by George Catlin

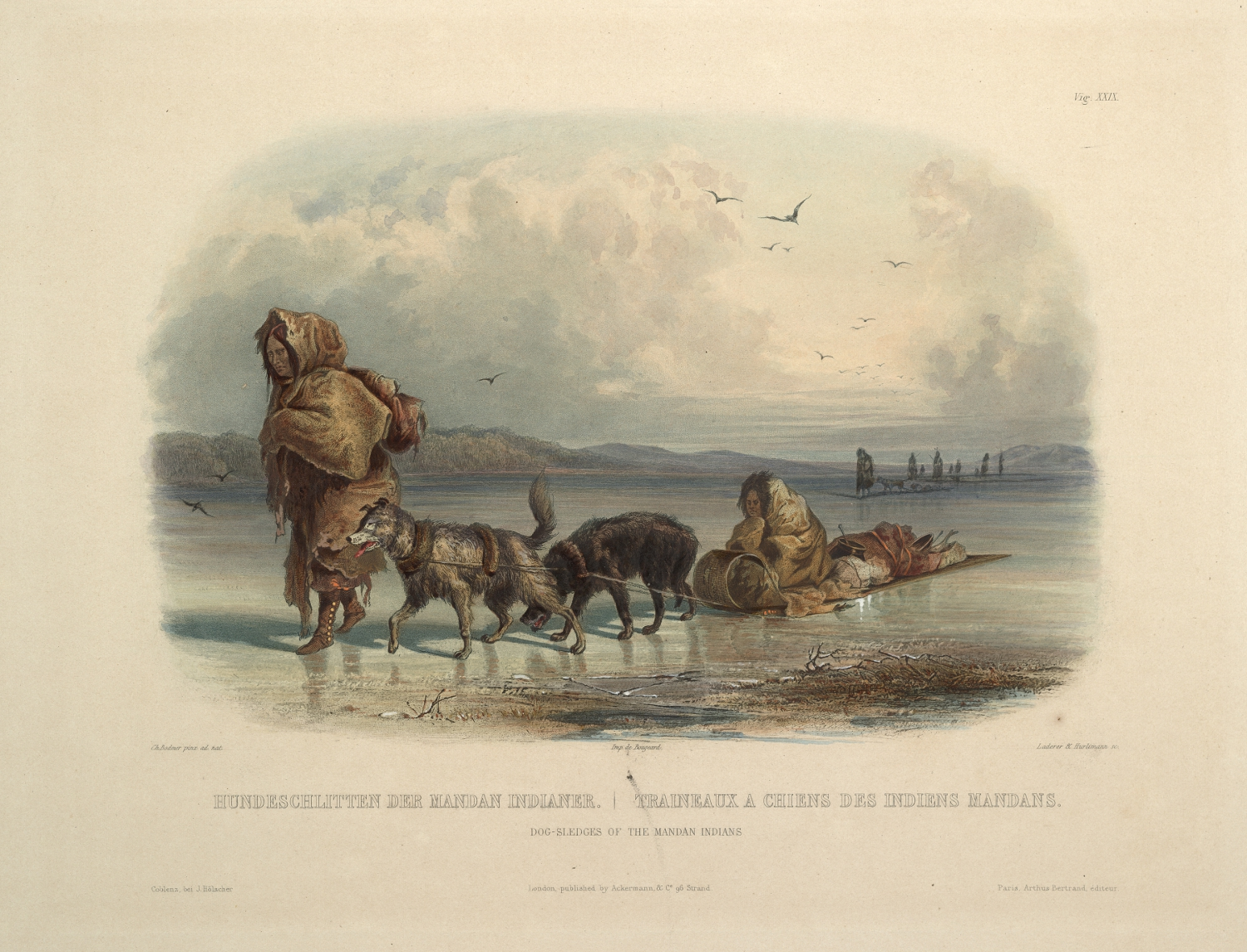
"Dog-sledges of the Mandan Indians": aquatint by Karl Bodmer from the book "Maximilian, Prince of Wied's Travels in the Interior of North America, during the years 1832–1834"

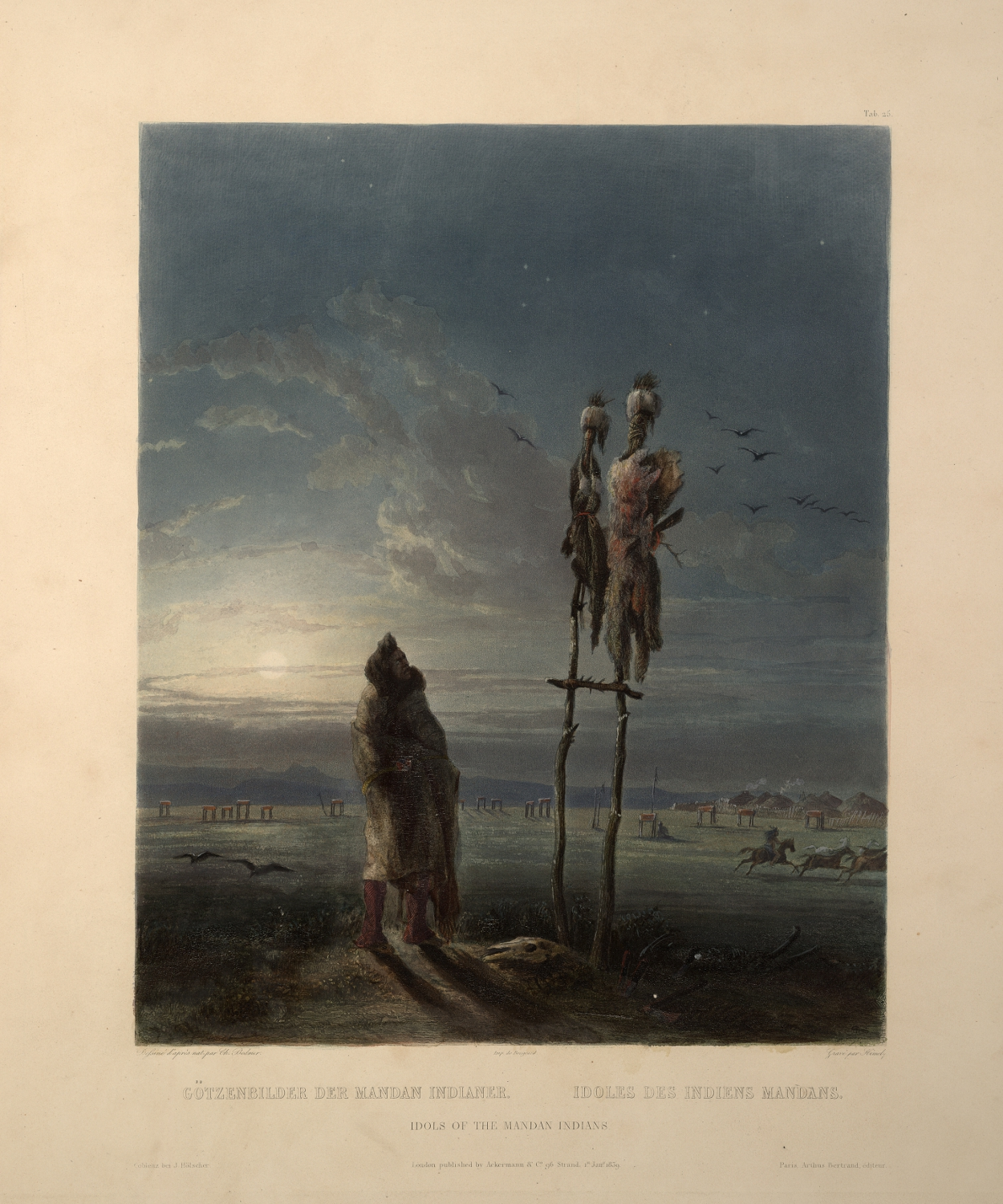
"Idols of the Mandan Indians": aquatint by Karl Bodmer from the book "Maximilian, Prince of Wied's Travels in the Interior of North America, during the years 1832–1834"

Mandan.

== See also ==
- Moon-eyed people
- White Buffalo Cow Society
- Plains Indians
- Indian Vaccination Act of 1832
