= Elbowoods, North Dakota =

Ghost town in North Dakota, United States

Elbowoods hiswíkat (Arikara)
- Ghost town
- Location within North Dakota Location within the United States
- Coordinates: 47°35′31.9″N 102°09′33.3″W
- Country: United States
- State: North Dakota
- County: McLean
- Settled: 1889
- Established: 1893
- Destroyed: 1954
- Elevation: 1,740 ft (530 m)

Elbowoods (Arikara: hiswíkat, [hisˈwikə̥t]) is a ghost town that was located in McLean County, North Dakota, United States, on the Fort Berthold Indian Reservation. It was founded in 1889 along the Missouri River as the agency seat for the reservation of the Mandan, Hidatsa, and Arikara Nation. After the creation of the Garrison Dam and Lake Sakakawea, rising water levels threatened the town, slowly engulfing its buildings until the entire town was submerged in 1954.

== Geography ==
Elbowoods was located in McLean County, North Dakota, and was the agency seat for the Fort Berthold Indian Reservation for the Mandan, Hidatsa, and Arikara Nation. It was located on the floodplains near the Missouri River, at an elevation of 1,740 feet (530 m). North Dakota Route 8 ran through the town. It was located about 5 miles (8 km) southwest of present-day White Shield.

== History ==
Elbowoods was first settled in 1889 as a headquarters for the reservation's agency. In 1893, a post office was established. At its peak, hundreds of people lived in Elbowoods, which included a hospital, school, gas stations, and various other businesses. Between 1936 and 1954, approximately 1,000 students attended the school and about 150 students graduated high school. The local land on the Missouri River floodplains was well-suited for agriculture, and the reservation was largely self-sufficient as a result.

The 1941–1942 Elbowoods Warriors high school basketball team and their loss at the 1942 Class B state championship was the subject of a PBS documentary released in 2019. The game was played at the high school in Minot against the Lakota Raiders. One of Elbowoods's star players, John Rabbithead, turned 20 that day and per regulations set by the North Dakota High School Athletics Association (NDHSAA), had to sit out the game. Although Elbowoods led almost the entirety of the game, Lakota won by one point scored in the last minute, for a final score of 39—38. After a revelation that Lakota's team had allowed a 20-year-old to play not just during the championship but for their entire season, Elbowoods was awarded the title in October 1942, but the year's championship was voided by the NDHSAA in November 1943. The championship title was re-awarded to Elbowoods in 2002.

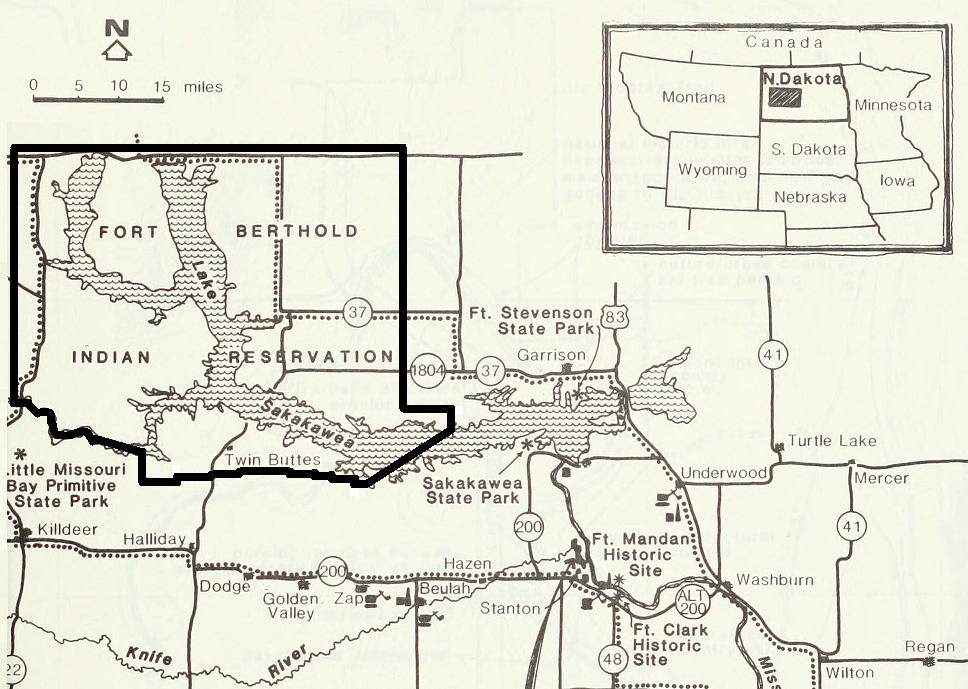
A map showing the extent of Lake Sakakawea in the Fort Berthold Reservation.

In the 1940s, as part of the Pick–Sloan Missouri Basin Program, plans were drawn up to create the Garrison Dam, which would subsequently create Lake Sakakawea, for the purpose of providing hydroelectric power, irrigation, and recreation in the area. The project garnered heavy opposition from local Native American communities, particularly the Mandan, Hidatsa, and Arikara Nation, as it would mean considerable loss of land and cultural resources. The floodplains including Elbowoods and much of the agricultural land would be part of that loss.

Construction proceeded regardless of the opposition. In April 1953, the water was diverted towards the new dam. A ceremony celebrating the success of Garrison Dam's completion was held on June 11. The flooding took about a year to reach Elbowoods itself, and water levels began to rise very slowly. Many residents did not move until the water reached their houses. Some residents disinterred relatives buried in the cemeteries—about 1,500 in total—and reburied them on higher ground. The post office closed in the spring of 1954.

The entirety of Elbowoods was eventually submerged. Residents were forced to relocate from the floodplains to the highlands, which changed their lifeways, as different crops and wildlife were available in that area. About 94–98% of the reservation's arable land was inundated, and about 20% of the reservation's total land. The newly-established New Town became the new agency seat and many former Elbowoods residents relocated there. The Four Bears Bridge was moved from its crossing at Elbowoods to New Town.

Lake Sakakawea's Elbowoods Bay was named in memory of the town.

== Notable people ==
- Edwin Benson (1931–2016), educator and last native speaker of the Mandan language
- Raymond Cross (1948–2023), attorney and law professor
- Edward Lone Fight (born 1939), Chairman of the Three Affiliated Tribes (1986–1990)
- Alyce Spotted Bear (1945–2013), educator and politician

== See also ==
- List of ghost towns in North Dakota
- Sanish, North Dakota
