= Twin Buttes, North Dakota =

- Unincorporated community
- Location within North Dakota Location within the United States
- Coordinates: 47°30′59″N 102°14′47″W
- Country: United States
- State: North Dakota
- County: Dunn
- Elevation: 2,221 ft (677 m)
- Time zone: UTC-6 (Central (CST))
  - Summer (DST): UTC-5 (CDT)
- Area code: 701
- GNIS feature ID: 1032562

Twin Buttes (Hidatsa: Idarúhxa Arucúhgaru Maa’ú’sh or cuuk gaamaaʔuush; Mandan: Tííru’pa Pshíí Wóónis) is an unincorporated community in Dunn County, North Dakota, United States. It is a community on the Fort Berthold Indian Reservation, which is home of the Mandan, Hidatsa, and Arikara Three Affiliated Tribes. Twin Buttes is 2 miles (3.2 km) south of Lake Sakakawea, and 12 miles (19 km) north-northeast of Halliday.
