= Mandan, Hidatsa, and Arikara Nation =

Native American nation in the US

The Mandan, Hidatsa, and Arikara Nation (MHA Nation), also known as the Three Affiliated Tribes (Mandan: Miiti Naamni; Hidatsa: Awadi Aguraawi; Arikara: ačitaanu' táWIt), is a federally recognized Native American Nation resulting from the alliance of the Mandan, Hidatsa, and Arikara peoples, whose Indigenous lands ranged across the Missouri River basin extending from present day North Dakota through western Montana and Wyoming.

After the signing of the Fort Laramie Treaty (1851) and subsequent seizure of land, the Nation's land base is currently approximately 1 million acres located in Fort Berthold Reservation in northwestern North Dakota. The Tribe reported a total enrollment of 17,492 enrolled members of the Mandan, Hidatsa and Arikara Nation as of December 2024. Nearly 5,600 live on the Fort Berthold Indian Reservation; others live and work elsewhere.

== History ==
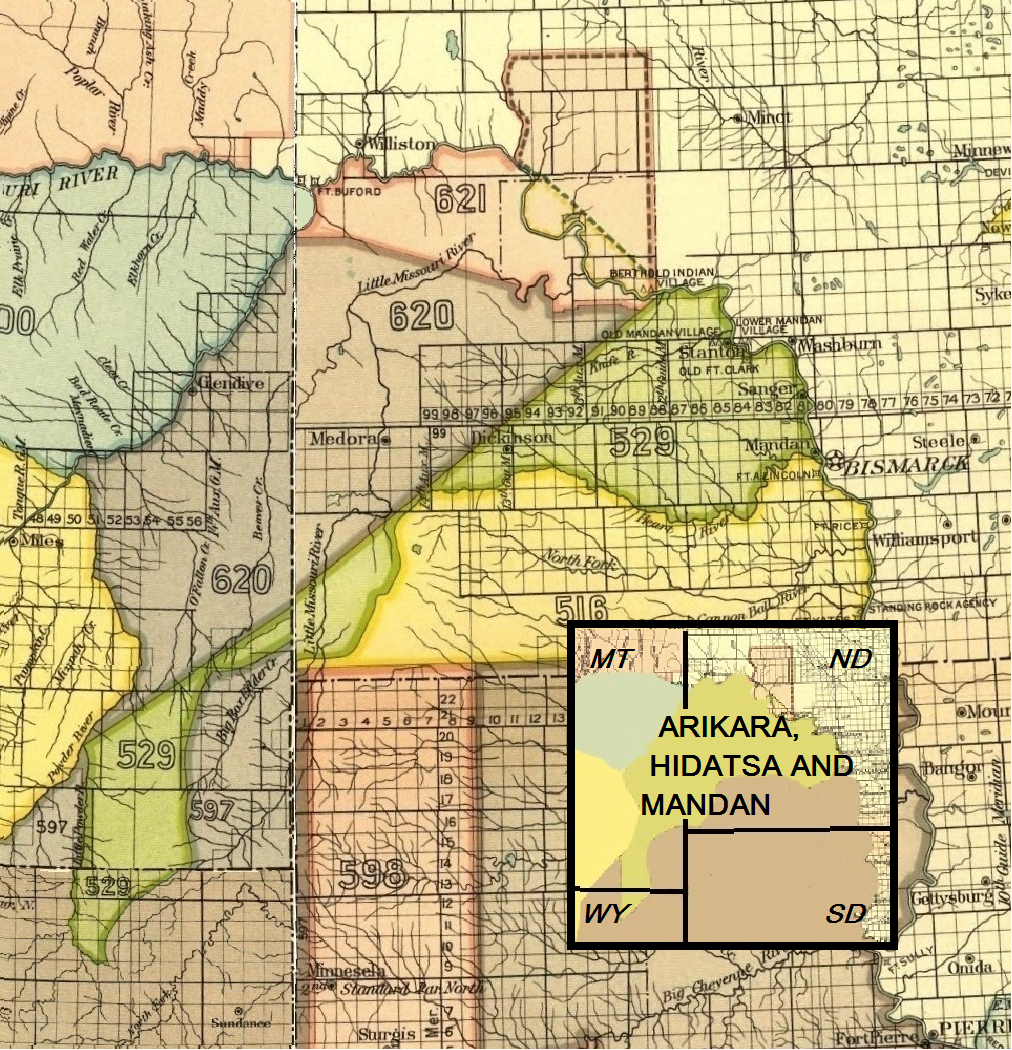
Arikara, Hidatsa and Mandan 1851 treaty territory. (Area 529, 620 and 621 south of the Missouri). The Fort Berthold Reservation is located on a significantly reduced portion of the land guaranteed to the three tribes under the Fort Laramie Treaty of 1851. Further, they had their only permanent village (Like-a-Fishhook Village) here in 1870.

=== Formation of the Mandan, Hidatsa, and Arikara Nation ===
The Mandan and Hidatsa tribes formed an alliance after the smallpox epidemic of 1837–1838 decimated the Mandan, leaving approximately 125 survivors. The Mandan subsequently banded together with the Hidatsa to survive. In 1845 the Mandan and Hidatsa jointly established a new town, Like-a-Fishhook Village.

In 1862, the Arikara settled with the Mandan and Hidatsa at Like-a-Fishhook to escape war with the Lakota, forming a confederacy that would later be known as the Three Affiliated Tribes. The Nation now commonly refers to itself as the "Mandan, Hidatsa, and Arikara Nation" in most situations although "The Three Affiliated Tribes" is used as well.

Under the Indian Reorganization Act of 1934, the tribes formed a tribal government which they called the Three Affiliated Tribes, a sovereign tribal nation.

=== Tribal history ===
==== Mandan ====
The Mandan, who refer to themselves as Nueta, are a Native American tribe currently part of the Three Affiliated Tribes of North Dakota. At the height of their historic culture, the Mandan were prosperous and peaceful farmers and traders, noted for their excellent maize cultivation and crafting of Knife River flint. They built earth lodges, and made villages of considerable technical skill, and cultivated many varieties of maize. They were a more sedentary people than other, more nomadic tribes of the Great Plains.

Lewis and Clark stayed with the Mandan when they passed through the Upper Missouri region on their expedition to the Northwest, including five months in the winter of 1804–1805. Sakakawea, a Hidatsa who has subsequently been claimed by both the Shoshone and Hidatsa, joined the expedition as an interpreter and native guide. Because of her role in salvaging the expedition, she was honored with an image on the U.S. dollar coin. On the return trip, the expedition brought the Mandan chief Sheheke Shote with them back to Washington, DC.

Some explorers described the Mandan and their structures as having "European" features. In the 19th century, a few people used such anecdotes to speculate that the Mandan were, in part, descended from lost European settlers who had arrived at North America before 1492, the voyage of Christopher Columbus. One legend associated them with having Welsh ancestry. Historians and anthropologists have debated this history; however, the MHA people and their oral tradition agree that there was historic admixture. This is the legend of Madoc ab Owein, popularized in relation to the Mandan in the 19th century by the painter George Catlin. The current center of Mandan culture and population is the community of Twin Buttes, North Dakota.

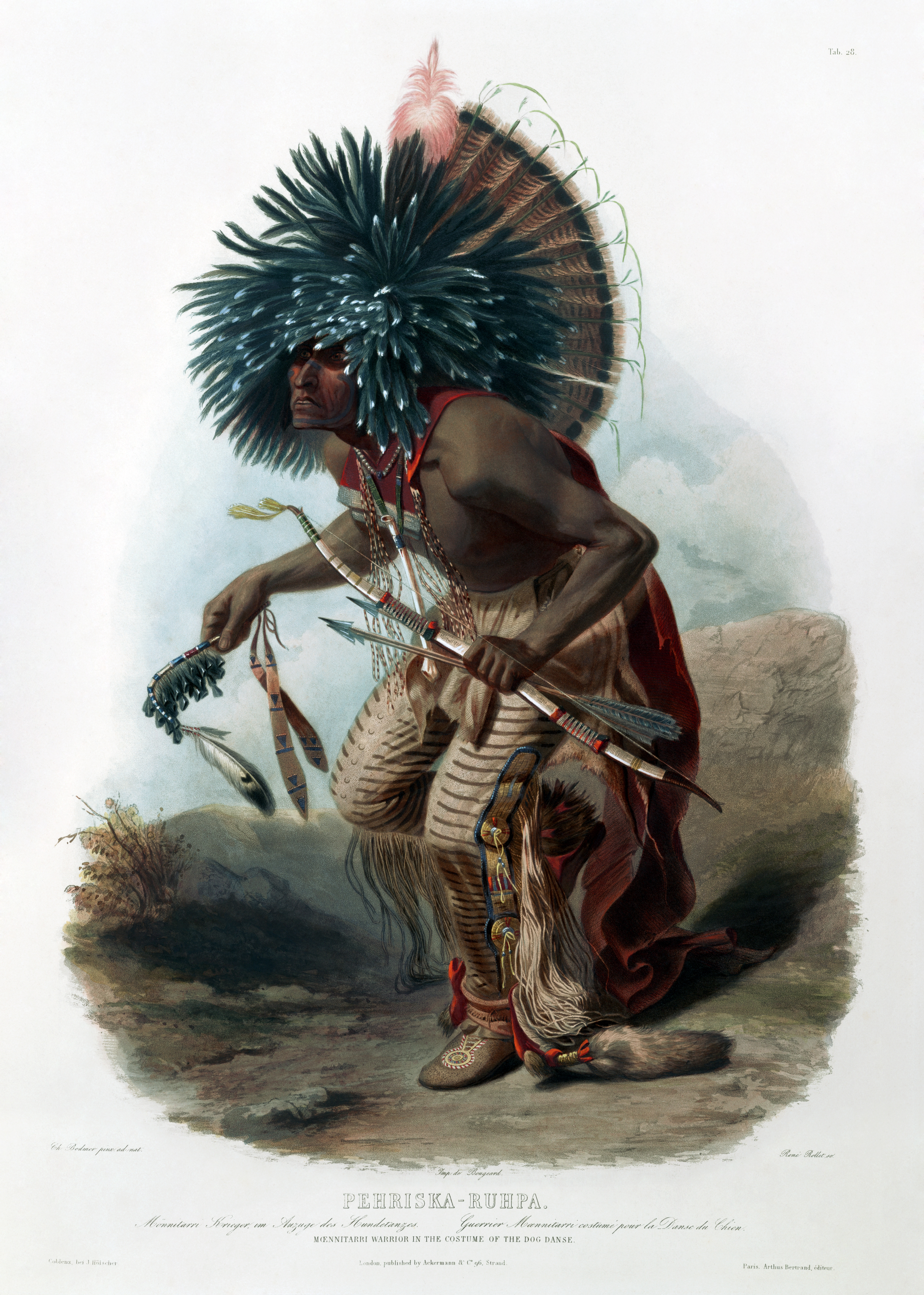
Pehriska-Ruhpa of the Dog Band of the Hidatsa, c. 1832–1834, by Karl Bodmer.

==== Hidatsa ====
The Hidatsa, called Moennitarri by their allies the Mandan, are a Siouan-speaking people. The Hidatsa name for themselves (autonym) is Nuxbaaga ("Original People"). The name Hidatsa said to mean "willows", was that of one band's village, after a prominent landscape feature. When the villages consolidated, the tribe used that name for their people as a whole.

Their language is related to that of the Crow nation. They have been considered a parent tribe to the modern Crow in Montana. The Hidatsa have sometimes been confused with the Gros Ventre, another tribe which was historically in Montana. In 1936, the Bureau of Indian Affairs compiled the Tribe's Base Roll listing all Hidatsa as "G.V.", for Gros Ventre. Today about 30 full-blood Hidatsa are members of the Affiliated Three Tribes. Most Hidatsa people have ancestry also of the Mandan and Arikara tribes.

==== Arikara ====
The Arikara call themselves Sahnish. The Arikara were forced into Mandan territory by conflict with the Lakota (Sioux), between the Arikara War and the European-American settlement in the 1870s. The Arikara lived for many years near the Fort Clark trading post, also called Knife River.

In 1862 they joined the Hidatsa and Mandan at Like-a-Fishhook Village, near the Fort Berthold trading post. For work, the Arikara men scouted for the U. S. Army, stationed at nearby Fort Stevenson. In 1874, the Arikara scouts guided Custer on the Black Hills Expedition, during which his party discovered gold. This resulted in a rush of miners to the area, causing conflict with the Lakota, who considered the Black Hills to be sacred.

In 1876, a large group of Arikara men accompanied Custer and the 7th Cavalry on the Little Big Horn Expedition. Arikara scouts were in the lead when US Army forces attacked the widespread encampment of thousands of Sioux and Cheyenne warriors and families. Several scouts drove off Lakota horses, as they had been ordered, and others fought alongside the troopers. Three Arikara men were killed: Little Brave, Bobtail Bull, and Bloody Knife. During the subsequent confusion, when the scouts were cut off from the troopers, they returned to the base camp as they had been directed. After the battle, in which Custer and some 260 other US troops were killed, the search for scapegoats resulted in some critics mistakenly accusing the scouts of having abandoned the soldiers.

== Land base ==
=== Tribal reorganization ===
The United States issued two executive orders in 1870 and 1880 that diminished the land base of the Mandan, Hidatsa, and Arikara by approximately 80% to make way for a new railroad. Their land was again reduced a further 60% in 1886 when the Fort Berthold Reservation was established. In all, about 11.4 million acres (46,000 km^{2}; 17,800 mi^{2}) of tribal lands were taken.

Following the creation of the contemporary Fort Berthold Reservation in 1886, the Bureau of Indian Affairs forced tribal members to leave Like-a-Fishhook Village and take up individual allotments. The stated purpose of the reservation was to enable the Mandan, Hidatsa, and Arikara "to obtain the means necessary to enable them to become wholly self-supporting by the cultivation of the soil and other pursuits of husbandry."

Tribal leaders spent three decades petitioning the United States government to receive fair compensation for the lands ceded by the executive orders of 1870 and 1880. The tribe was eventually awarded $2.2 million as compensation in 1930.

Under the Indian Reorganization Act of 1934, the tribes formed a tribal government which they called the Three Affiliated Tribes, a sovereign tribal nation.

The Fort Berthold Indian Reservation consists of 988,000 acres (400,000 ha), of which 457,837 acres (185,280 ha) are owned by Native Americans, either as individual allotments or communally by the tribe.

Modern map of the Fort Berthold Indian Reservation and nearby reservations (In red). With shown areas owned by the tribe.

=== Garrison Dam ===
In response to severe flooding on the lower Missouri River in 1943, Congress passed the Flood Control Act of 1944 and authorized the creation of the Garrison Dam.

In order to construct the dam, the US government needed to purchase 152,000 acres of agricultural land in the Fort Berthold Reservation that would be flooded by the creation of Lake Sakakawea. Threatened by confiscation under eminent domain, the tribes were forced to accept $5 million in exchange for their lands. This amount was increased to $7.5 million in 1949, but it hardly compensated for the loss of 94% of the tribe's agricultural land.

The majority of tribal members were forced to relocate far-flung, unproductive parcels of land. The construction of Garrison Dam almost totally destroyed the traditional way of life for the Three Affiliated Tribes and made them much more dependent on the federal government.

The tribe petitioned the government for decades to receive compensation for the unjust taking of their land. In 1992, Congress awarded the Mandan, Hidatsa, and Arikara Nation over $149.2 million and over 156,000 acres (63,000 ha) of land in just compensation for wrongs imposed on the tribal people by the Garrison Dam.

== Membership/Citizenship qualifications ==
There are 17,228 enrolled members of the Mandan, Hidatsa and Arikara Nation as of 16 June 2023. Approximately 2/3rd reside off the Reservation and 1/3rd live on the Fort Berthold Indian Reservation;.

Membership (citizenship) is derived from the 1936 Indian Census roll of the Three Affiliated Tribes. On 2 November 2010 the tribal membership passed amendments specifying "blood quantum", or minimum amounts of tribal ancestry to qualify individuals for membership and for candidates for public office. Effective 16 December 2010 individuals must possess at least 1/8th degree blood of the Mandan, Hidatsa, or Arikara ancestry (the equivalent of one full-blooded great-grandparent) to become an enrolled member of the MHA Nation and 1/4th degree blood of the Mandan, Hidatsa, or Arikara ancestry to run for the Tribal Business Council.

== Economy ==
The Fort Berthold Indian Reservation sits atop the Bakken Formation, the second most-productive geographic area for shale oil production in the United States. The nation receives roughly 90 percent of its revenue from royalties and taxes on oil and gas development. In 2023, the nation bought an idle 31-mile long pipeline (50 km) from Enbridge to help deliver oil from the wells. The pipeline runs from the Plaza/Wabek fields to Enbridge's terminal in Stanley.

=== Tribal Business Council ===
The Tribal Business Council consists of six Segment Representatives and a chairman. Each member's term lasts 4 years, and there are no term limits. The Tribal Business Council holds Regular Meetings on the second Thursday of each month, and sub-committees meet at different times throughout the month. A legal quorum as defined in the constitution of the Three Affiliated Tribes is 5 of the 7 council representatives.

Position	Council Representative	Segment	Term Began	Term Expires
Chairman	Mark N. Fox	MHA Nation	2022	2026
Vice-chairman	Cory Spotted Bear	Twin Buttes	2020	2024
Treasurer	Mervin Packineau	Parshall/Lucky Mound	2022	2026
Executive Secretary	Fred W. Fox	White Shield	2020	2024
Member	Robert White Sr.	Four Bears	2022	2026
Member	Sherry Turner-Lone Fight	Mandaree	2020	2024
Member	Dr. Monica Mayer	New Town/Little Shell	2020	2024

Sub-Committees
Executive Committee
Chair	Mark N. Fox
Vice-chair	Cory Spotted Bear
Executive Secretary	Fred W. Fox
Treasurer	Mervin Packineau
Cultural Committee
Chair	Sherry Turner-Lone Fight
Member	Mervin Packineau
Member	Robert White Sr.
Economic Committee
Chair	Robert White Sr.
Member	Sherry Turner-Lone Fight
Member	Dr. Monica Mayer
Education Committee
Chair	Dr. Monica Mayer
Member	Sherry Turner-Lone Fight
Member	Robert White Sr.
Energy Committee
Chair	Fred W. Fox
Member	Cory Spotted Bear
Member	Monica Mayer
Health & Human Resources Committee
Chair	Dr. Monica Mayer
Member	Fred W. Fox
Member	Robert White Sr.
Judicial Committee
Chair	Dr. Monica Mayer
Member	Fred W. Fox
Member	Robert White Sr.
Natural Resources Committee
Chair	Cory Spotted Bear
Member	Fred W. Fox
Member	Dr. Monica Mayer

== Notable tribal citizens ==
- Gerard Baker, retired National Park Service Ranger and formerly the highest ranking Native American within the NPS.
- Ruth Buffalo, elected to the North Dakota House of Representatives in 2018
- Raymond Cross, an American attorney and law professor who represented Native Americans in multiple landmark trials, including two U.S. Supreme Court cases.
- Forrest Goodluck, Actor
- Tex G. Hall, Chairman of the Three Affiliated Tribes from 1998 to 2006
- Juanita Helphrey (1941–2018), director of the North Dakota Indian Affairs Commission (1975–1990), national staff on the United Church of Christ (1991–2004)
- Denise Juneau, State Superintendent of Public Instruction for Montana
- Edward Lone Fight (1940–2025), Chairman of the Three Affiliated Tribes (1986–1990)
- Cannupa Hanska Luger, visual artist
- Alyce Spotted Bear (1945-2013), educator and Chairwoman of the Three Affiliated Tribes (1982-1987)
- Erica Thunder, former Commissioner, North Dakota Department of Labor and Human Rights, youngest and first Native American to hold such Cabinet position; former Interim Executive Director, North Dakota Indian Affairs Commission and current Commissioner of the North Dakota Indian Affairs Commission, first Native American and youngest Cabinet member to hold two Cabinet positions simultaneously; USA Today's first Woman of the Year for the State of North Dakota 2021-2022
- Tillie Fay Walker (1928–2018), civil rights activist and community leader
