= Okipa =

Native American religious ceremony

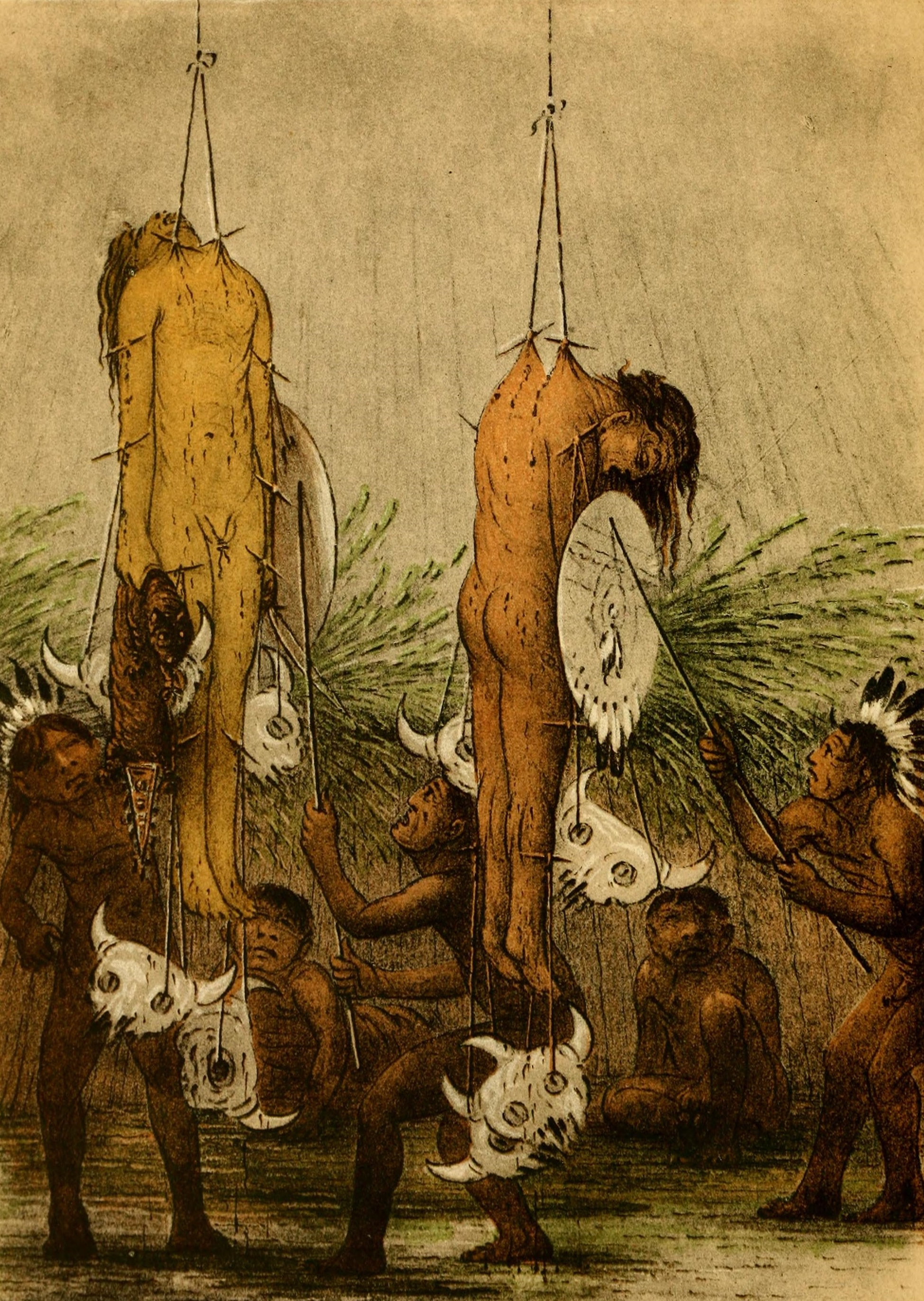
The rotation of the participants hanging by their wounds until they fainted, illustrated by George Catlin in his account of the ceremony (1867)

The Okipa (Mandan pronunciation: [o'kipa]), sometimes rendered as Okeepa or O-kee-pa, was the most important religious ceremony among the Mandan people in what is now North Dakota. The ceremony was a partial retelling and reenactment of Mandan mythology, and was done to provide good fortune and ensure the tribe had plentiful buffalo to hunt. It took place mainly in a ceremonial clearing at the center of a Mandan village and a large earth lodge, known as the Medicine Lodge or Okipa Lodge, dedicated exclusively for the purpose. It was led by a prominent member of the tribe, known as the Okipa Maker, who had earned the right to host, and two men who represented important figures in Mandan mythology. During the Okipa, young men in the tribe submitted to extreme ritual torture, including scarification and dismemberment, as a rite of passage and to induce supernatural visions. The men starved themselves for as long as all four days before being cut through their bodies, suspended from the lodge ceiling through these cuts, and weighed down with buffalo skulls tied to rope suspended through other cuts on the body. They were then made to run around the central clearing until the buffalo skulls were ripped out of their flesh.

The mythological origins of the Okipa centered around a creator figure called Lone Man and his conflict with a supernatural member of the tribe called Speckled Eagle. Its roles were doled out through special permissions earned or sold to certain members of the tribe. The ceremony took place at least once a year and usually during the summertime, though it regularly occurred two or three times a year and was known to be performed during the winter. Throughout the process dancers dressed as male buffalo were painted by the townspeople and performed ritual dances outside the Medicine Lodge as young men inside fasted and submitted to the torture. During the third day, a trickster figure who ritually harassed the women of the tribe with a large symbolic penis was at the center of several of the performances. He was driven away by the tribe's women and the theft of his symbolic penis elevated one of the women to leadership status. At the end, a process known as Walking with the Buffalo took place, wherein the young married women of the tribe performed ritual sex with the Bull Dancers of the tribe, which imbued the young women – and by extension their husbands – with a supernatural energy known as xópini.

The Okipa was first attested in the writings of the American painter George Catlin, who earned the goodwill of the tribe and was allowed to view the ceremony, though he was not the first non-Indian to observe the event. While some of his account has been criticized as inaccurate or sensationalist, much of it has been corroborated by later independent accounts. While the ceremony kept some continuity, the events in the Okipa changed and altered through time, especially after a devastating bout of smallpox in 1837. The ceremony is thought to have influenced the Sun Dance performed by many Plains Indian tribes, most notably the Cheyenne's. Although the ritual torture receded as a focal point of the ceremony over time, the Okipa was formally outlawed in 1890.

== Background ==
=== People ===
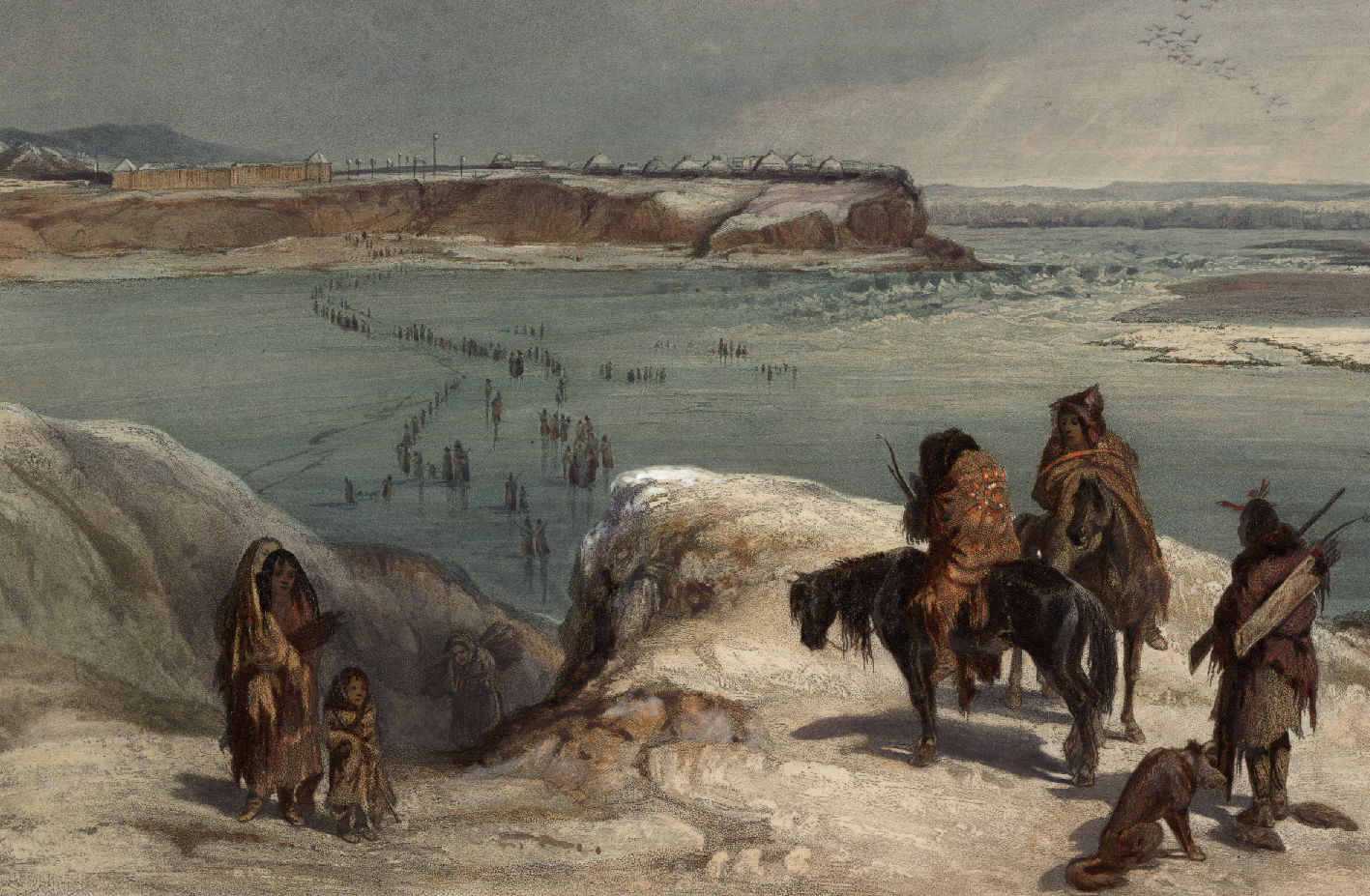
The Mandan tribe depicted crossing the Missouri River in Fort Clark on the Missouri (February 1834) by Karl Bodmer

The Mandan people are a Native American tribe of the Great Plains in modern-day North Dakota. The tribe moved north along the Missouri River, eventually establishing seven to nine fortified towns near what is now Mandan, North Dakota – comprising about 15,000 people – between 1450 and 1550. First contact with white traders is attested by the French-Canadian trader Sieur de La Vérendrye in the fall of 1738, who visited nine robust villages which the Mandan considered to be their oldest; he reported that the tribe was powerful and prosperous, fearing none of its neighbors and dominating trade in the region. (Note: While Sieur de La Vérendrye is usually considered the first, it is possible that the French aristocrat Louis-Armand de Lom d'Arce de Lahontan may have met a band of Mandan in 1689.) It is estimated that there were also about 15,000 Mandan during Sieur de La Vérendrye's visit.

The Mandan reached their zenith around 1772. About ten years later, the two or three villages on the east bank of the river were devastated by a bout of smallpox, forcing them northward and causing them to consolidate into one village. The five villages on the west were similarly devastated, collapsing from about six or seven villages to just two. The Mandan briefly recovered, allying themselves with the Hidatsa and Arikara against the Sioux before another outbreak of smallpox in 1837 reduced their numbers to no more than three hundred, though some estimates put the number as low as thirty individuals. Today, the allies comprise the Three Affiliated Tribes, located in and around the Fort Berthold Indian Reservation.

=== Mythos ===
The Okipa was, in part, a reenactment of the Mandan's religious historiography. Traditional Mandan stories state that the ceremony was first performed at the mouth of the White River in modern-day South Dakota; this claim has been backed up by archeological evidence. The myths regarding the people's origins are somewhat varied, but the Mandan traditionally relate that they emerged from underground. The Mandan religion centered around a creator figure, known as Lone Man (Mandan: Numakmaxena).

One story, recorded by the American anthropologist Alfred W. Bowers, describes the merging of two moieties, a kind of mass kinship group: the Buffalo People and the Corn People. The Corn People were said to have surfaced from underground, guided by a chief named Good Furred Robe. The Buffalo People, on the other hand, were created on the soil near Heart River by Lone Man after he created land. The Corn People migrated northward and unified with the Buffalo People around Heart River, which then became a meeting place for all Mandan. Another story relates that the people emerged from the underworld by climbing a grapevine which eventually snapped, leaving some people beneath the earth's surface. Those who made it above ground marched northward to Heart River, settling at Devils Lake.

==== Settling of the Waters ====
Part of the Okipa celebrated the Settling of the Waters (Menerokahasha), a part of the tribe's flood myth. The story begins with an evil chief called Maniga who controlled a gluttonous tribe across a lake. Each time Mandan tribesmen traveled to his area of control, Maniga forced them to gorge themselves so viciously on "food, water, tobacco, and women" that several tribesmen died. Lone Man stopped Maniga by tricking him into crossing the lake himself and Maniga then vowed retribution by promising to become a devastating flood. The tribe split up to avoid destruction; one clan traveled to the mountains to the west while the other, perhaps under the leadership of Good Furred Robe, traveled to Eagle Nose Butte, hoping its height would protect them from the flood. When the flood came, Lone Man saved the entire tribe by building a wall around the village bound with rings of willow branches; the waters rose to the very height of the wall, but stopped. A recreation of the barrel-like structure of the wall was then placed in the center of the town's central clearing by Lone Man; a cedar post was placed in its center, representing Lone Man himself.

==== Dog Den Butte conflict ====
Much of the Okipa, however, focuses on Lone Man's conflict with Speckled Eagle (Hoita), a magical figure born among the Mandan. Tradition holds that Speckled Eagle lived inside Dog Den Butte, a butte in which many spiritual figures lived. He was cloaked in a beautiful white buffalo robe and Mandan regularly brought him gifts. When Lone Man made himself incarnate among the people, (Note: Another version of the story relates that Lone Man was given to the Mandan as a representative to his father, a supreme spirit called First Creator, who visited them together.) he became jealous of Speckled Eagle's robe, invoking the spirits of the sky in helping him. The spirits of Thunder, Rain, and Sun failed to obtain the robe, but Whirlwind blew it from Speckled Eagle's possession and a group of Mandans took the robe back to Lone Man. (Note: Fenn (2014) reports that Thunder, using a tornado, obtained the robe.)

In anger and jealousy, Speckled Eagle imprisoned the animals of the earth inside Dog Den Butte. The Mandan then began to starve and Lone Man saw some animals heading toward the butte. Transforming himself into a rabbit to investigate, he saw the animals trapped inside and performing an odd dance. Upon his return to the Mandan, he related what he saw and instructed them to perform a ceremony while dancing like the animals did. The Mandan did not have drums loud enough to attract Speckled Eagle's attention from inside Dog Den Butte, so Lone Man asked the four turtles which held up the world on their backs if they would serve as drums. They turned him down, but instructed him to make drums in their image with the strongest buffalo hide. One of the drums escaped into the Missouri River near Heart River.

The drums worked, and Speckled Eagle was drawn to a dance occurring in the Mandan village. A young man had been selected from among the tribe to play the role of Speckled Eagle in the Okipa and trick him into believing the man was his son by placing fireflies inside his eyes. When Speckled Eagle confronted the young man about his impersonation, his eyes opened and the fireflies flew out; Speckled Eagle saw this and interpreted it as how his own eyes flashed with lightning. Speckled Eagle then released the animals and agreed to work with Lone Man to perform the rite. The Okipa is in part a retelling of this episode of the Mandan mythos and, although Speckled Eagle did not hold a significant part of the overall mythology of the Mandan, he was held in equal importance during the Okipa.

=== Purpose ===
The Okipa was the most important celebration of the Mandan people. There were several reasons for the rite: to reenact the history of the tribe, to ensure its well-being, and to hail self-sacrifice as a virtue. The ceremony was said to provide good fortune to the tribe and ensure that buffalo would be plentiful for hunting.

The ceremony had to be held at least once a year, but it was regularly held in every village two or three times, typically in the summer, though winter ceremonies were sometimes held. Two villages could never hold an Okipa at the same time; there were only one set of turtle drums, (Note: These were not drums made from turtles, but rather buffalo-hide drums made in such a shape that resembled one. Culturally, they were similar to medicine bundles; members would pray to the drums and make feasts for them. They were considered the holiest possessions in Mandan culture; only three are known to have existed with any certainty.) which were absolutely critical to conducting the ceremony. If only one Okipa was held in the summer, it would occur after a major hunt, but if two were held, one would occur before the hunt as well.

== Organization ==
=== Clan and band structure ===
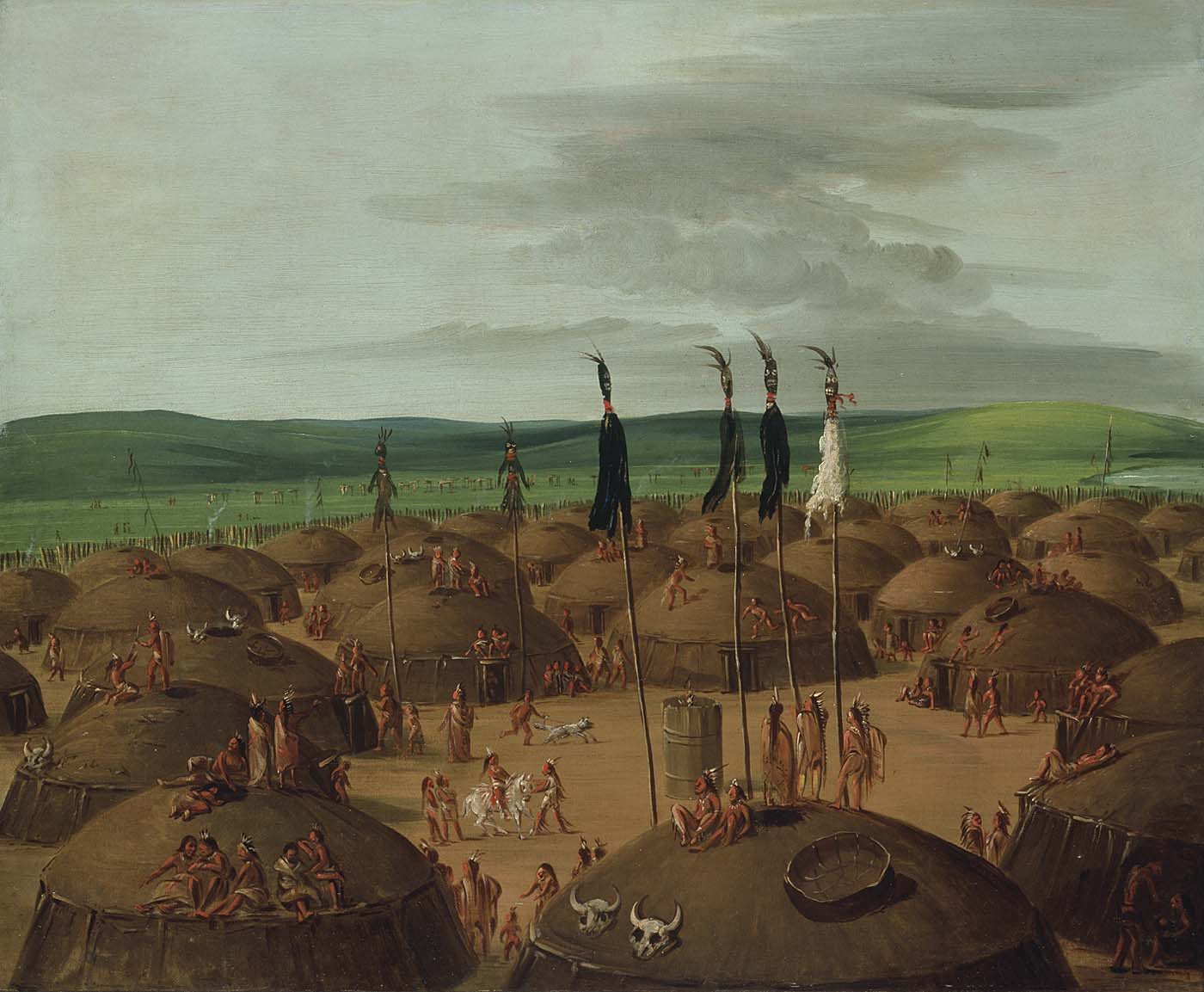
A painting of a Mandan village by George Catlin (c. 1838)

The Mandan people were divided into a two-pronged moiety system, divided into the western Buffalo moiety and the eastern Corn moiety. These moieties were composed of several clans; tradition dictates that the clan names and moiety division before the advent of smallpox was as follows:

Buffalo moiety (West)		Corn moiety (East)	
Waxikena	'Tell Bad News' (Note: Also translated as 'Tell Bad Stories [About]')	Sipuskanumak	'Prairie Chicken People'
Tamisik	No meaning (Note: Bowers writes that although the word had no meaning, Tamisik clan members were often perceived as "stingy" and treated guests with "small portions".)	Ipokanumak	'Speckled Eagle People'
Tamixixiks	'Bad Strap'	Matodomak	'Bear People'
Three other clans whose names are no longer remembered		Masedomak	'Red Hill People'
Three other clans whose names are no longer remembered		Amakadomak	'Badger People'
Three other clans whose names are no longer remembered		Hoxexakanumak	'Crow People'
Three other clans whose names are no longer remembered		Manakasanumak	'People in the Grove'

Within each village were sets of ceremonial officers with particular roles in the rite who were traditionally a part of the five historical, inter-village bands: Istopa ('Those Who Tattooed Themselves'), Nuptadi ('Two Voices' or 'Those Who Came Second'), (Note: Also known as the Rupta or Nupta. The second translation as 'those who came second' is derived from having lived apart from the rest of the Mandan until 1792, when they were forced to relocate after a conflict with the Lakota.) Mananare ('Those Who Quarrel[ed]'), Awigaxa, (Note: The name is probably derived from the term ą́ąwe kaxé ('something everyone has'), a term now associated with all Mandan people among its modern descendants. The band was ultimately assimilated into the Nuitadi following a smallpox outbreak in 1782.) and Nuitadi ('Our People'). Each of these bands had their own ceremonial officers. Clans and bands were not synonymous; an individual's band referred to their linguistic and political affiliations within Mandan society, while clan referred to their biological and kinship relationships.

Because Lone Man had incarnated himself into the Waxikena clan and Nuptadi band, these two groups had special status within Mandan culture. The Waxikena in particular were seen as the highest clan. The history of the tribe, for example, was relayed by ceremonial officers who translated it from an ancient form of the Mandan language unique to the Nuptadi. Some words in the language were intelligible to contemporary speakers, but it was impossible for a layperson to understand the overall history without an interpreter. These stories could be bought from the officers, who would sing or otherwise relay the information to the paying audience, but the purchase of the stories was strictly forbidden from being relayed to anyone else.

=== Personnel ===
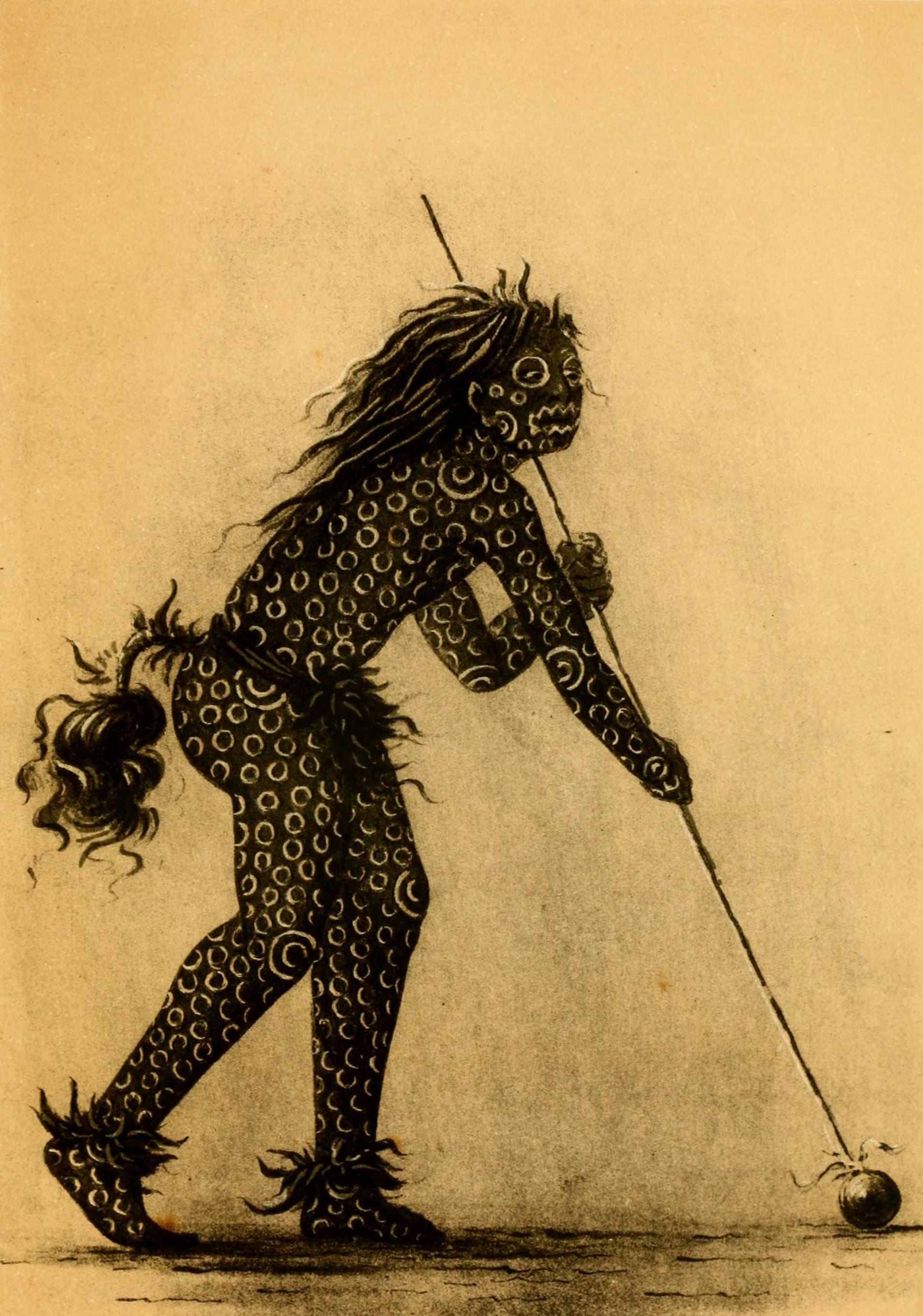
The Foolish One, without his symbolic penis, from Catlin's 1867 account

==== Okipa Maker ====
The Okipa Maker was a highly-respected role in Mandan society. His main role was to sponsor the ceremony and to provide food for the village during it. To earn this position, the candidate for the role had to acquire "at least one hundred" kinds of robes, dresses, and other assorted goods, which were to be doled out during the ceremony. Given the scale of the process, a candidate was invariably assisted by his family, including both of his parents' clans. The process of collecting these goods regularly took over a year. He was prohibited from killing, butchering, or eating the entrails of any buffalo during this period where he was expected to host the next Okipa. These men also held esteemed roles outside of the Okipa, serving as ambassadors to other Mandan villages and defining policies towards them. During the ceremony, he was painted yellow.

==== Religious society ====
The Okipa Religious Society was a group of tribesmen who conducted and directed the ceremony, and chose young men in the tribe who were qualified to participate. It was composed of a figure representing Lone Man, a figure representing Speckled Eagle, eight singers, and anyone who had previously served as the Okipa Maker.

===== Lone Man figure =====
Lone Man was a central figure to the Okipa and only a member of the Waxikena clan could play him. His role during the ceremony was to direct particular scenes, namely reenacting the flood myth, the use of the turtle drums, and anything involving the cedar post. During the Okipa, the Lone Man figure wore a white wolf robe made of four wolf pelts and his entire body was covered in white clay, including his face. His headdress was made of porcupine hair and jackrabbit fur, capped with a stuffed raven tied to it; his neck and ankles were also decked in jackrabbit pelts. He carried with him a wooden pipe in his left hand and a club in the other. The club adorned with the moon and the thunderbird on one side, while the other side depicted the morning star and the sun.

===== Speckled Eagle figure =====
Another role was given to represent Speckled Eagle. Although Speckled Eagle was not as important as Lone Man in the Mandan mythos, during the Okipa, he became of equal importance. He could only be played by a member of the Waxikena clan or a member of the Tamisik clan. Like other rights in Mandan society, this position was sellable and the seller would become the director of the singers for the ceremony.

===== Singers =====
There were eight singers during the ceremony, which had fewer constraints than the other positions. Like the Speckled Eagle role, the role could be bought and sold, but members of any clan were eligible to hold the rights. Rights were also more plentiful for the singing position and they were issued out in turns. Anyone holding Lone Man or Speckled Eagle rights also implicitly held singer rights, though by choosing singing rights he forfeited the other role. Six would play a percussion instrument – either a turtle drum or a rolled buffalo hide – with half playing them "upstream" and the other "downstream", and the other two using rattles.

==== The Foolish One ====
During the second day of the Okipa, a member of the tribe was selected by the Speckled Eagle figure to become The Foolish One (Mandan: Oxinhede), a trickster character. This character represented those who committed blasphemy and sacrilege, and were therefore miserable. He was covered in black paint made from crushed charcoal and grease; white paint – representing the stars – was made into circles all around his body and on his face, there to mimic many sharp teeth, and a red crescent was made on the back, symbolizing the moon, and a red circle on his chest for the sun; to simulate holes through his joints, he painted some of his white circles with red. He was mostly naked, wearing only a breezecloth with a buffalo tail, some ankle cuffs, and a hat with a raven feather, all made of buffalo furs. He also wore a necklace made of corn husks, carrying a large ball of buffalo fur symbolizing a human head. Between his legs he had a massive symbolic penis made out of wood, also painted in black; at the end of this was a massive reprensentation of the glans, colored bright red and roughly four to five inches (10 to 13 cm) long. Beneath it, he wore two small pumpkins, representing his testicles. This symbolic penis was operated by a thin staff with a red ball at the end The Foolish One carried, which he used to harass the women of the tribe.

The Foolish One served both a cautionary and humorous role. His part of the third day's events typically met with laughter from the village onlookers. However, children were warned that he was cannibal and dreams with him were seen as omens of death and other misfortunes. He was said to be from the sun.

=== Structural composition ===
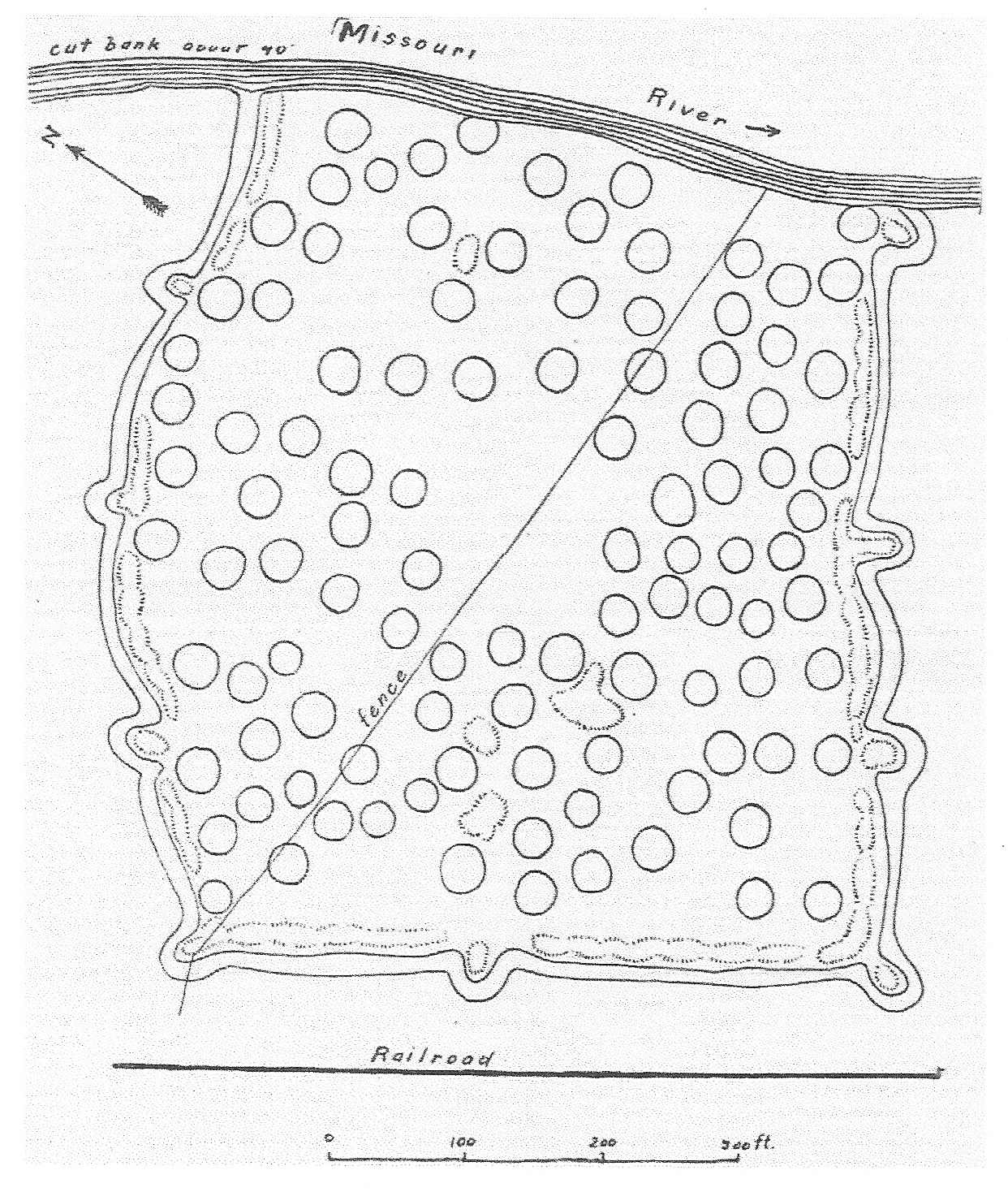
This drawing of the excavations at the Huff Archeological Site show the central ceremonial clearing, which has been dated to around 1500.

The ceremony took place around a clearing in the center of the town about 150 feet (45 m) in diameter with earth lodges built in concentric circles around it. In the center of this clearing was a cedar post painted red, representing Lone Man, flanked entirely by a wall of boards around the circumference of the cleared area, called the "Big Canoe", which was decorated with herbs and willows; all of the earth lodges had their entrances facing the cedar post. The entire clearing, including the boards and the post, were known as the Retreat of the Waters (Minimi'tahede); the symbolism of its boards was twofold, representing both the height of the flood that Lone Man had protected them from and the wall he had built to sustain the people. The cedar post and the boards were traditionally maintained by members of the Waxikena clan, though later the responsibility fell also to the Tamisik clan. Offerings presented and left at the post were considered the property of any Waxikena clan member, but it was considered dishonorable to take too much for oneself; offerings often sat for days and an announcement might be made by the taker that the purpose was for an infirm or elderly member of the clan to receive the article.

To the north of this cedar post was the Medicine Lodge, sometimes referred to as the Okipa Lodge; it was distinguishable from other lodges based on its size and its flat, southern-facing entrance. It was built directly upon the line dividing the village into east and west; the Corn moiety lived east of the line, while the Buffalo moiety lived on the west. It was constructed to contain four massive pillars to hold "the dome of heaven" up. The lodge was symbolic of Dog Den Butte, where Speckled Eagle had imprisoned the animals. During the ceremony, the Speckled Eagle figure directed the parts of the rite that occurred in the Medicine Lodge; he sat silently in the lodge while the Lone Man figure conducted rites outside, a symbol of the mythological figure's time in Dog Den Butte. Along with his family, a distinguished member of the Waxikena clan was selected from among his peers to occupy the lodge when the ceremony was not ongoing or imminent. While living there, he and his family were expected to maintain the lodge; he was entrusted by the community as "Custodian of the Medicine Lodge". During the ceremony, however, women were forbidden from entering. Whenever the Medicine Lodge was repaired, or if a new one was being constructed, each moiety would work on one side of the structure with the clans of each working in tandem with the others.

== Ceremony ==
=== Instigation ===
The process for beginning the Okipa started with a member of the tribe who sought to be the Okipa Maker having a vision of the buffalo singing songs associated with the Okipa and relating it to a vision interpreter. If the visionary was young, he informed his parents first of what he had experienced in the vision, and they would compare his life to the requirements of the ceremony; sons who were too young, or who had lazy or disloyal wives were considered inappropriate candidates. If the parents judged against his participation, the visionary was advised to host a feast for those who had already undergone the ritual. In return, they would offer him something to wear into combat and pray for his future success.

If the parents approved of his participation, the individual was then evaluated by the ceremony's religious society; if the vision was seen as valid and the individual deemed capable, the Okipa would begin. If there was doubt as to the validity of his vision, he was put on probation and instructed to fast and make himself useful to the tribesmen, including assisting the elderly and participating in war. If he succeeded in his instructions, his vision was thence declared valid and the Okipa took place during the next full blossoming of the willow trees.

=== Commencement ===
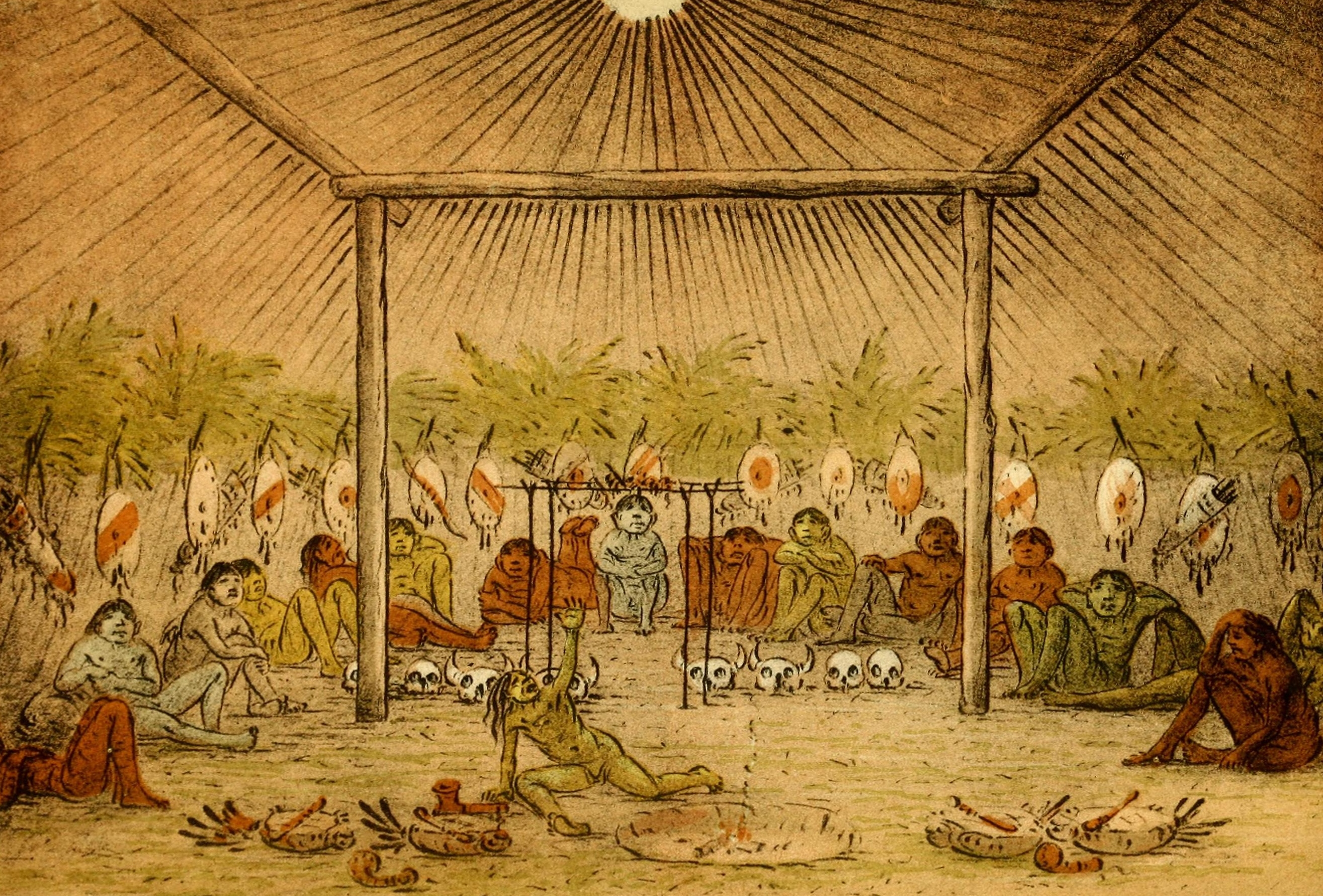
The painted men enter the lodge under the leadership of the Okipa Maker (center, in yellow)

The ceremony began with an announcement to those sitting on their lodges before sunrise from the Custodian of the Lodge that something important was to take place shortly. He informed them that Lone Man would open the Medicine Lodge at dawn. As the sun rose, the Lone Man figure, dressed in four white wolf skins and covered in white clay, approached as a group of warriors approached him; the Lone Man figure then related that he had come to open the Medicine Lodge. The important members of the tribe – the head chief, the second chief, and several other important persons – donned black face paint and waited for him to reach the village.

When he reached the village, he was stopped and questioned by the Black Mouth Society, an organization roughly equivalent to the police. Once identified, the Lone Man figure related the story of his incarnation, his fight with Speckled Eagle, his saving the people from the flood and from starvation. Women and young children were told to stay inside and keep their dogs leashed inside with them as the Lone Man figure moved from lodge to lodge recounting the Mandan origin story to each in the ancient Nuptadi dialect. Whenever he stopped at the lodge of a young man about to undergo the ordeal in the Medicine Lodge, he received a knife from the young man and gave the young man a handful of pemmican. The Lone Man figure then handed his pipe to the Okipa Maker before turning to the Speckled Eagle figure, to whom he entrusted overseeing the event.

All male participants of the tribe had their foreskins tied around their glandes with thin strips of deer leather or sinew before covering the entire genital region with white clay; the men undergoing the ritual inside the Medicine Lodge had this done by an elderly member of the tribe before entering. The American anthropologist Howard L. Harrod suggests that this may have been a way of "preserving the participants from a loss of potency during the ritual". Each of the participants going into the Medicine Lodge carried a bow, a shield, and a medicine bundle – often their father's if they had not earned one of their own yet – and were colored with either green, blue, red, white, or yellow paint; they each followed single-file into the lodge with the Lone Man figure. As they entered the lodge, they began a four-day fast. The men were organized by their moiety and clan; Waxikena members sat to the right and closest to the door, while on the left side farthest from the door were the Ipokanumak. Each laid out their bed, made of sagebrush, with a buffalo skull as a pillow.

=== First day ===
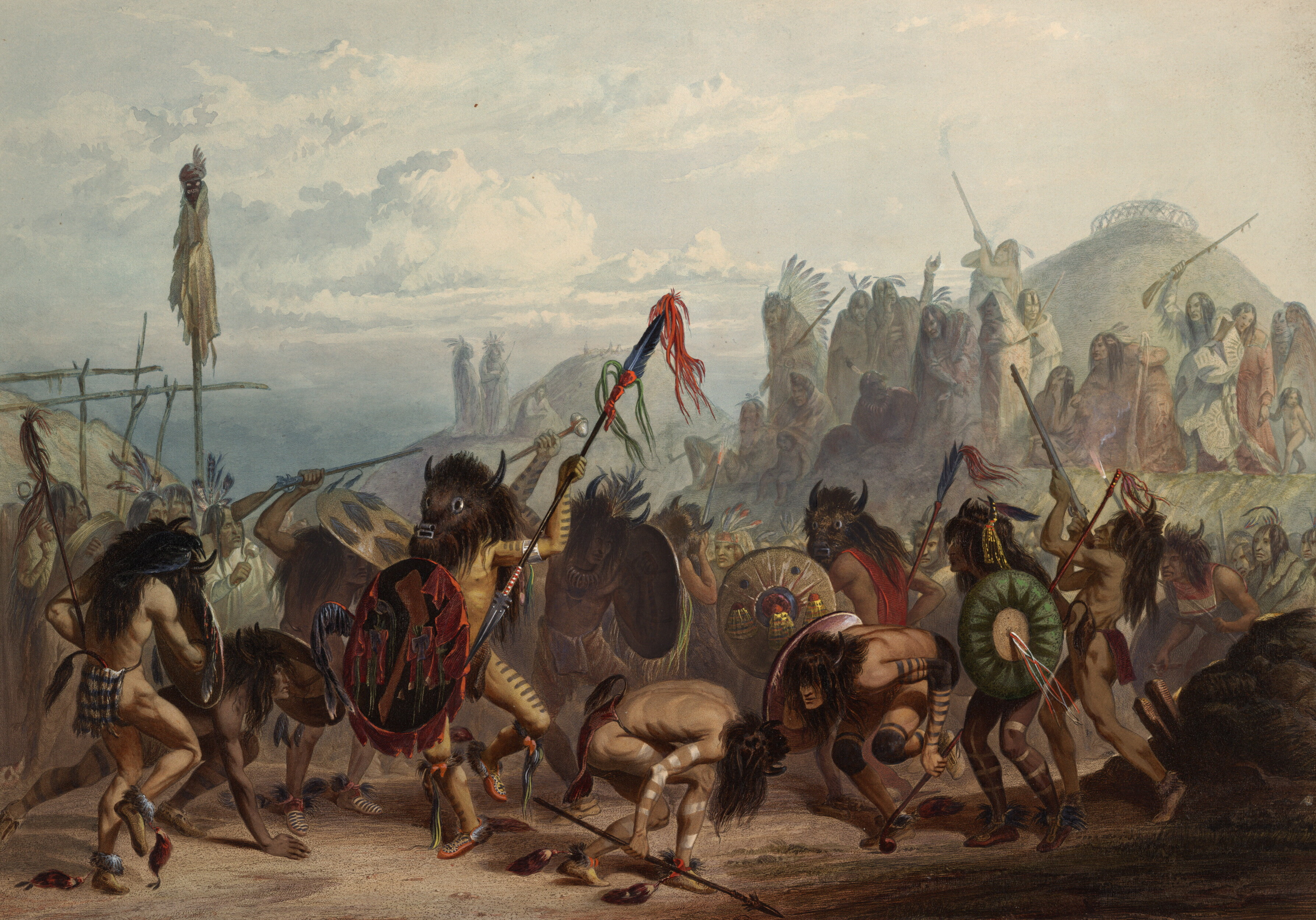
Bison Dance of the Mandan Indians in Front of Their Medicine Lodge by Karl Bodmer (c. early 1840s)

The first full day of the ceremony began with the exit of the drummers from the Medicine Lodge at dawn. The drummers sat down in front of the lodge with their backs facing its entrance. They were followed by the rattlers, who sat down behind them. The Okipa Maker then came out to them wearing an antelope hide which still had the head intact and was worn like an apron.

The Lone Man figure approached the drummers, leaving his pipe and several pemmican balls on the ground before approaching the south side of the cedar post. Standing on the buffalo skull he had left there, he grabbed the boards surrounding the ceremonial clearing and placed his forehead against them; he began praying for the welfare of the tribe, including for plentiful buffalo and against bad luck.

Each day, the participants – including the fasters inside the Medicine Lodge – exited for the Bull Dance. The first day included four instances of the dance: sunrise, just before noon, mid-afternoon, and just before sunset. When the singers began their song, the fasters left the lodge in two single-file lines – each faster paired with one in the other line – dressed in buffalo hides which still retained the animal's head and tail. Mimicking the buffalo such as by locking horns, one line headed to the west while the other headed east, forming one single-file line when they reached the south side. The name of the ceremony comes from the Mandan-language term okipe' meaning 'to look alike', referring to the Bull Dancers who emulated each other during the ceremonial dances. Spiritually, these men "became" the buffalo and thus, by dancing among the tribe, the tribe believed the buffalo would appear in their future hunts.

The dances ended when the drummers began a fast-paced song; the Okipa Maker led the fasters from the ceremonial clearing back into the lodge. Women in the Buffalo moiety, either of the Waxikena or Tamisik clan, then brought firewood made from willow to the lodge, which was brought into the lodge by their male counterparts in their respective clan, and any members of the first day's events inside the lodge who were not to undergo the ritual departed from the lodge, usually leaving between thirty and fifty members who were expected to complete the fast and undergo the ritual torture. The day ended with the Lone Man figure asking the owner of the biggest of the three turtle drums for it. The Lone Man figure was believed to be able to divine how many buffalo there would be based on the weight; a heavy turtle drum was considered especially auspicious. If the drum was heavy enough, the Custodian of the Medicine Lodge announced the good news to the village.

=== Second day ===
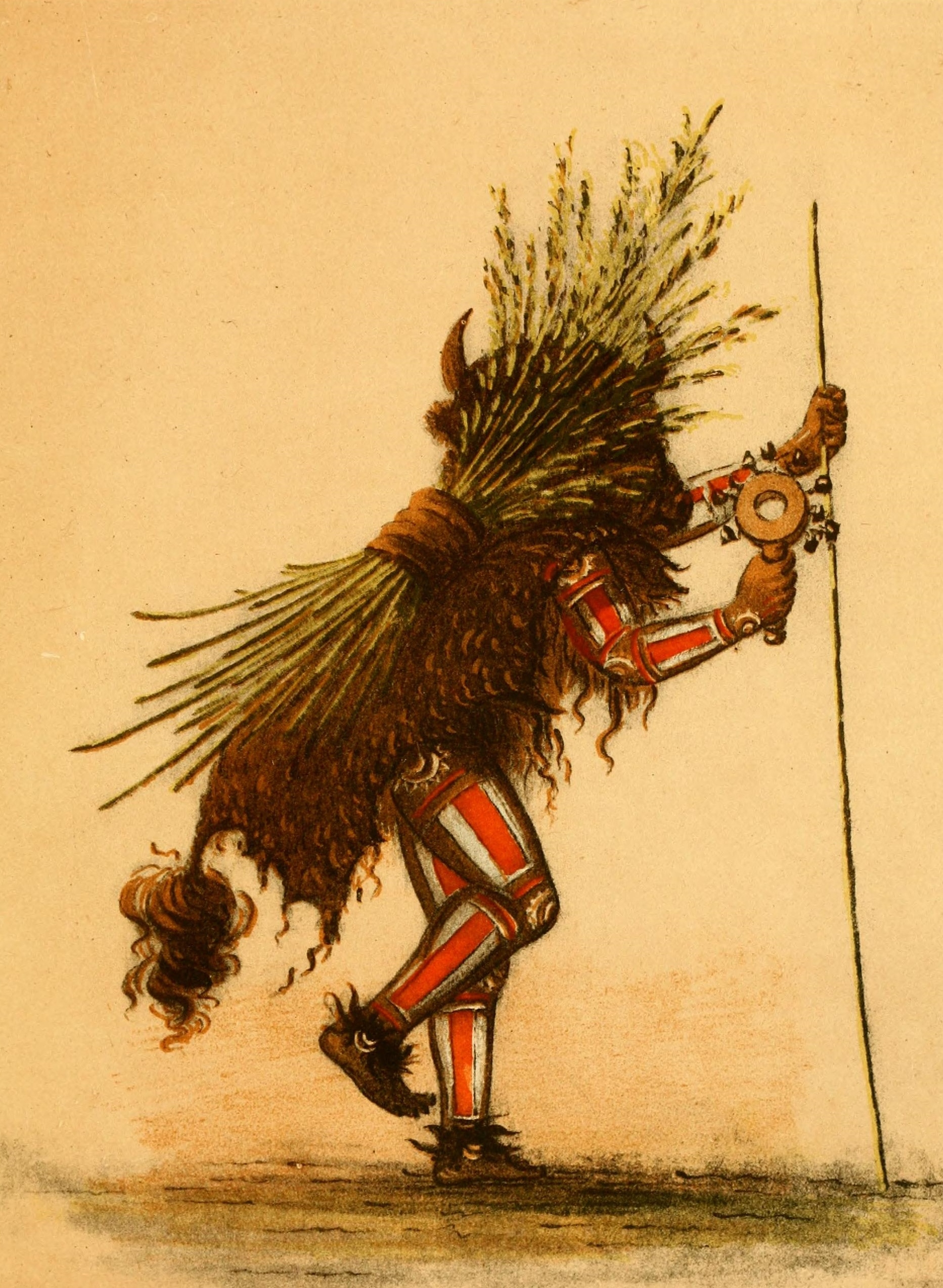
Catlin's rendering of a Bull Dancer (1867)

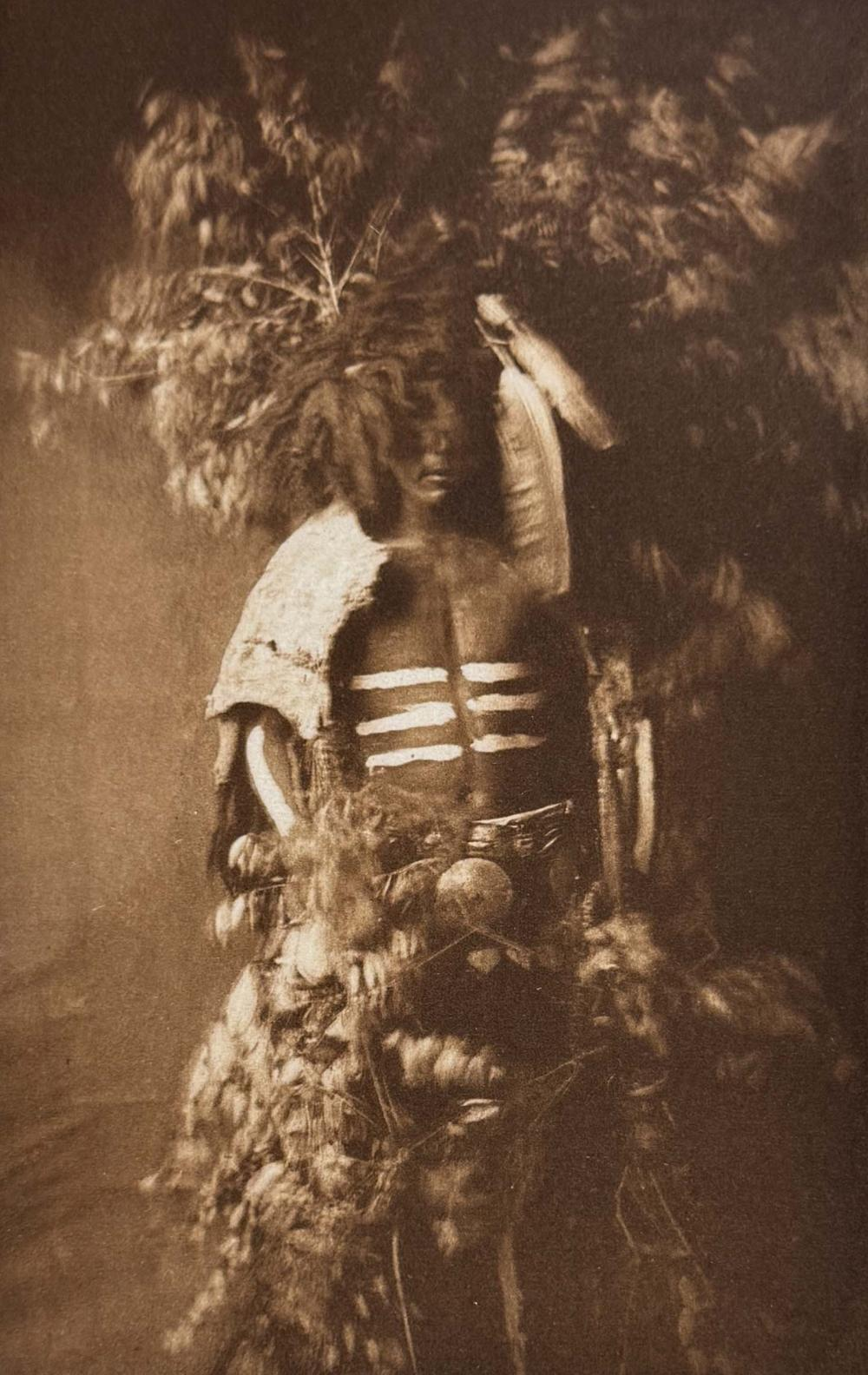
A photo of a Bull Dancer taken by Edward S. Curtis (c. 1908)

The second day began before sunrise; boys who were too young to partake in the ceremony took willow branches inside the lodge to decorate the next volley of Bull Dancers. These dancers danced eight times on the second day and were composed of the eight biggest men in the village, selected and trained by the Speckled Eagle figure; these men also received offerings on the third day. The dancers were dressed wearing buffalo heads with hide that reached their hips, wristlets and anklets made of buffalo fur, and bunches of willow branches – symbolizing Lone Man's salvific actions during the Great Flood – which were tied and fixed to the back with a buffalo horn. Other members of the tribe also painted the Bull Dancers in red, white, and black with a symbol of a young girl's face on the belly; this usually took until about noon.

The Lone Man figure walked through the village and was given robes as he passed. He again reached the south side of the cedar and began praying for the village as the Bull Dance began again. Although the dance took place eight times throughout the day, the fasters inside the lodge only emerged once on day two, during the first dance.

The ritual torture of the Okipa began on the second day. Inside the lodge, the fasters imitated the buffalo by fighting each other. After the prayers and dances, they then selected a member of their father's clan, referred to as his "clan father". This clan member would take the knife given to the Lone Man figure on the evening preceding the first day from an altar inside the lodge and cut through the faster's flesh. Several skewers were placed inside the cuts; two were either through the chest or back muscles while the rest were placed through the arms and legs, weighed down by strung buffalo skulls. A faster could wear the skull of an enemy he had killed around his neck. The fasters were then suspended from the ceiling of the lodge with lasso about three to four feet (0.9 to 1.2 m) from the ground and buffalo skulls were strung through the incisions on the arms and legs. Men inside the lodge then took long staves and pushed the fasters around in a circle at an increasing pace until they passed out, wherein onlookers shouted "Dead! Dead!". They were then lowered and left alone to have ecstatic visions which were induced by the extreme pain. Visions and other supernatural events that occurred during suspension were considered the most valuable and authentic.

=== Third day ===
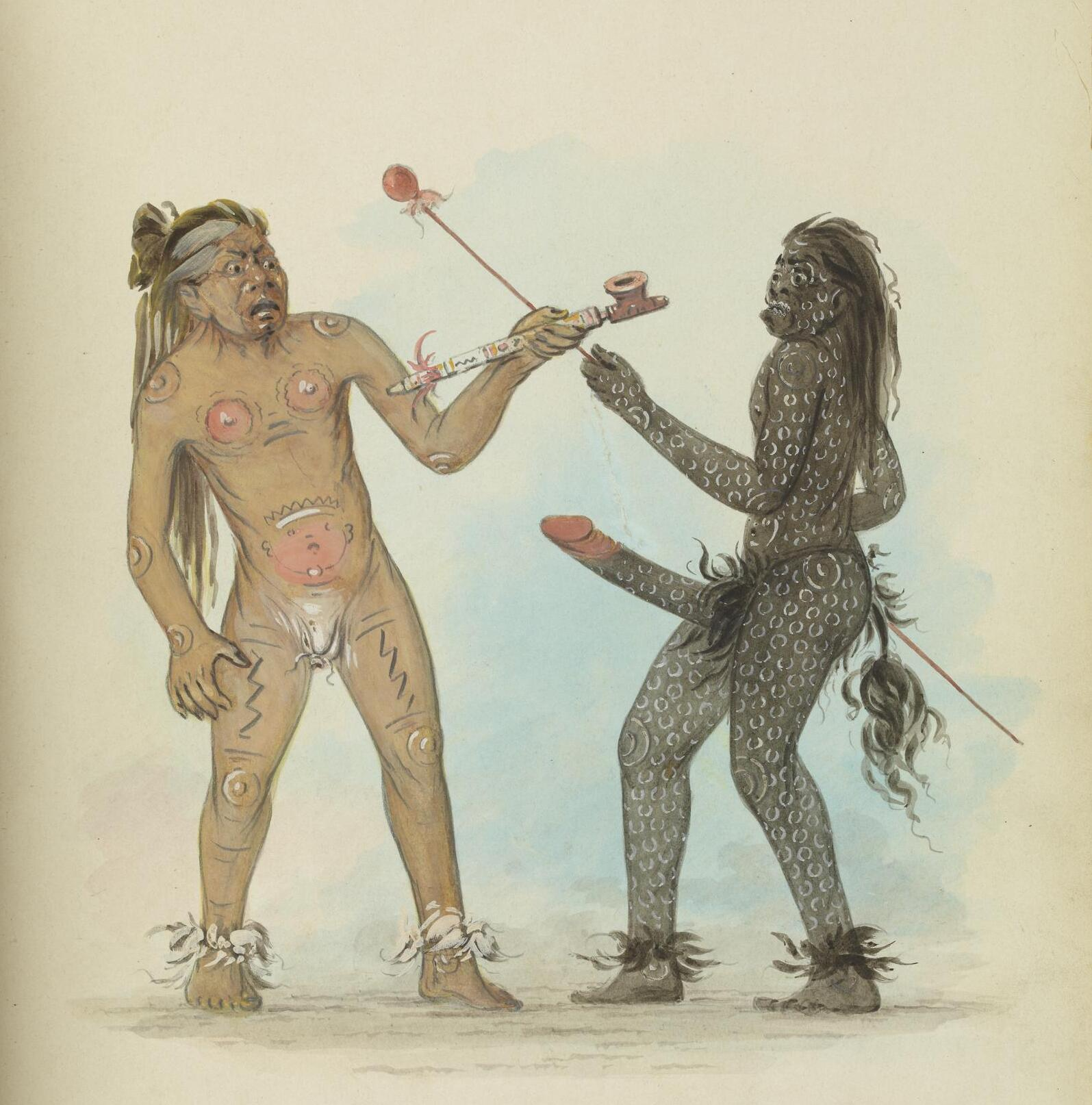
The Foolish One (right) is confronted by the Okipa Maker (A Test of Magic, illustrated by Catlin in 1864).

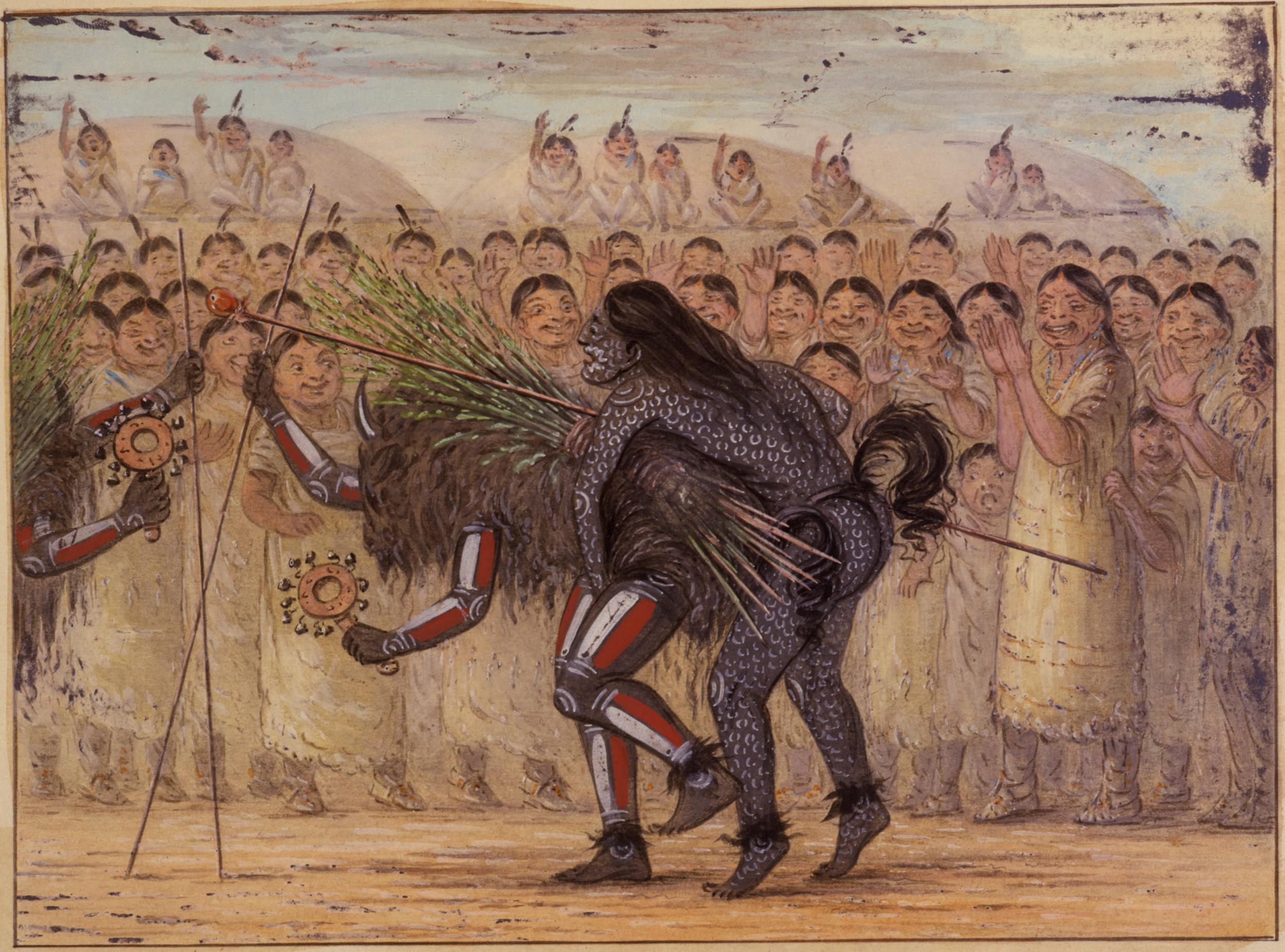
The Foolish One mimics buffalo breeding, placing his symbolic penis between the Bull Dancer and the dancer's hide

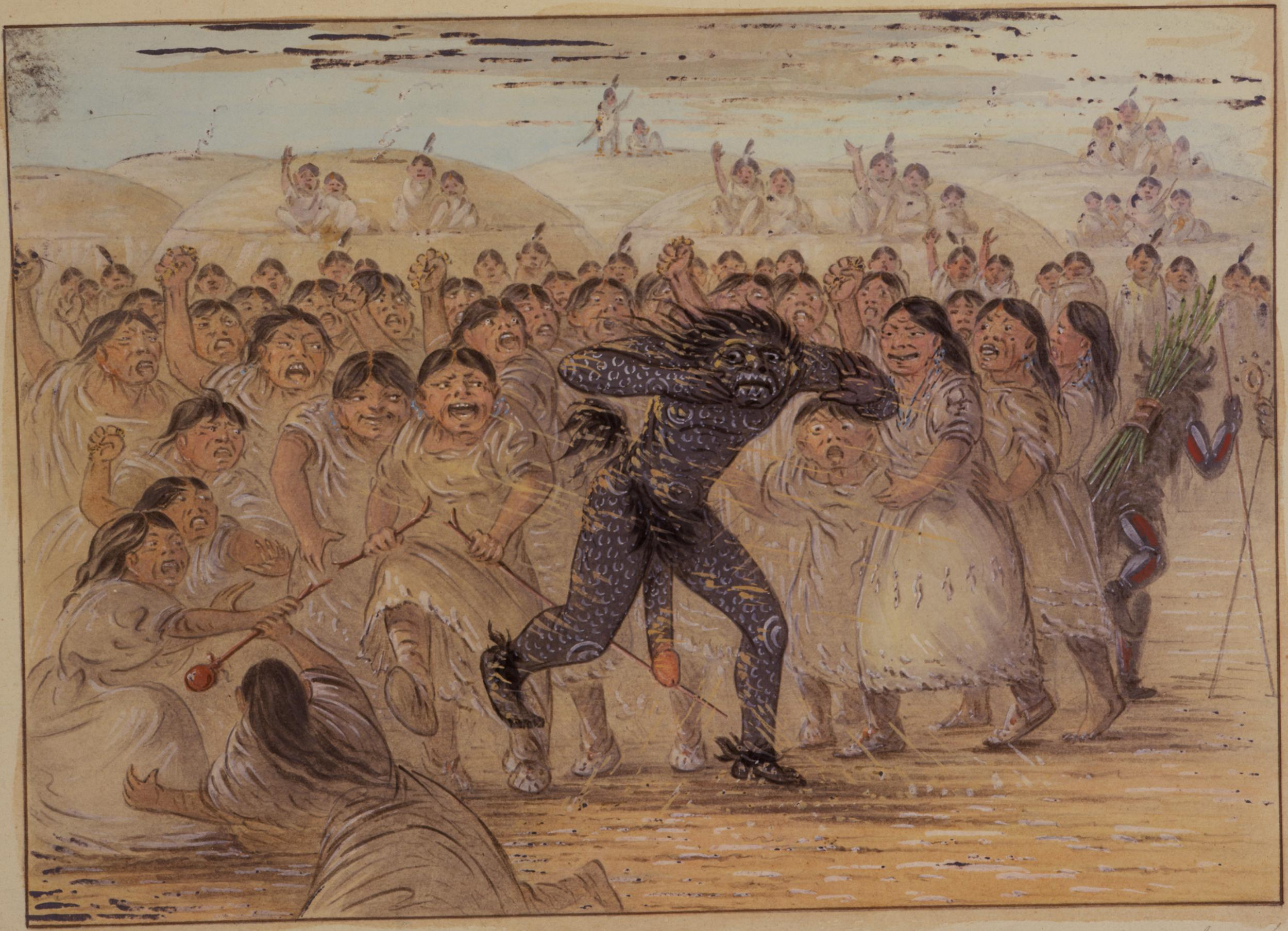
The women of the tribe chase off The Foolish One, pelting him with debris and snapping his staff

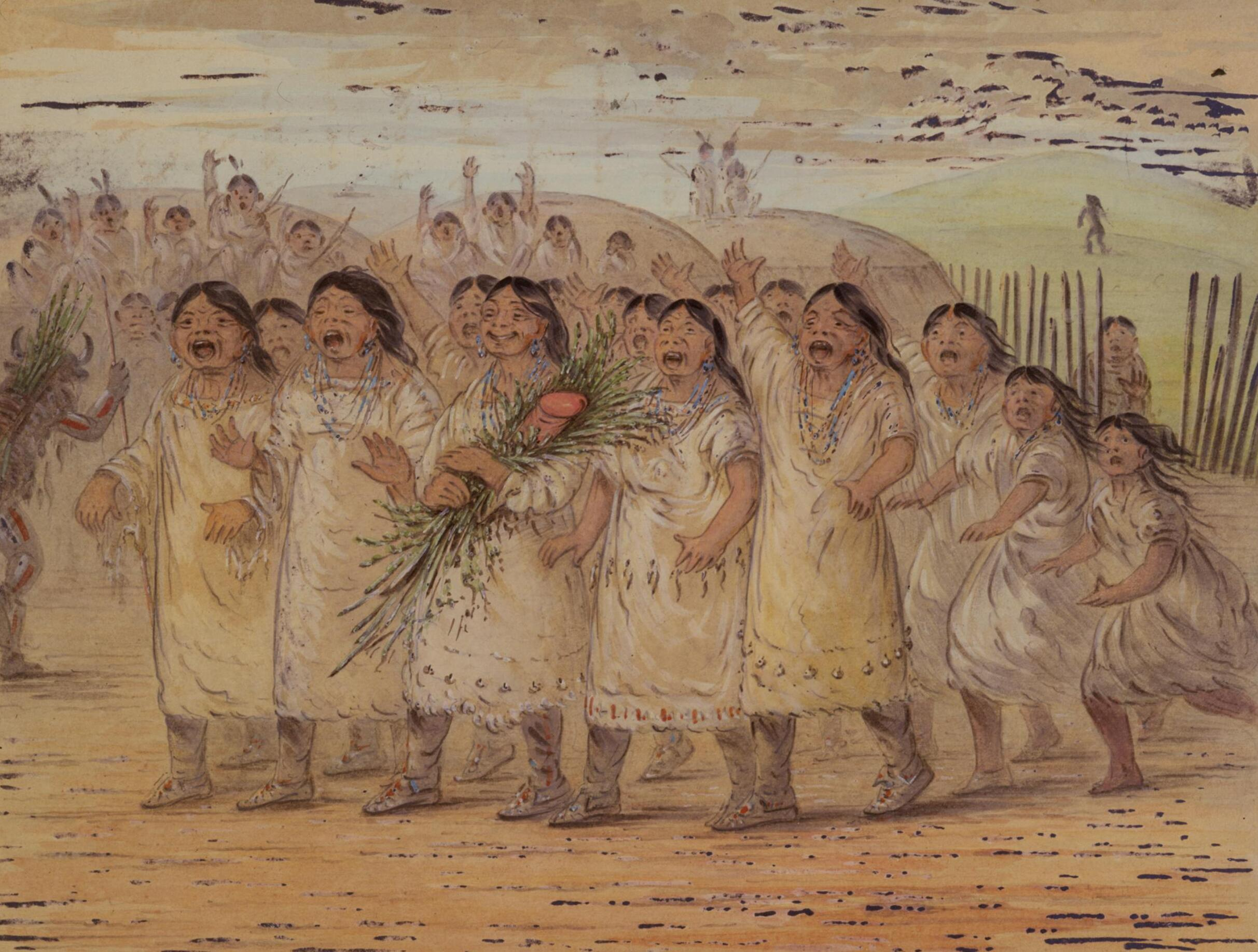
The women who chased The Foolish One return their champion, carrying his symbolic penis as a trophy adorned with sagebrush

The third day was the most important day of the Okipa, known as "Everything Comes Back Day" and symbolizing the dispersal of the animals of the earth from imprisonment by Speckled Eagle. The Bull Dancers were again painted and given fresh willows for the bundles on their backs; this process also took until about noon. On the third day, the Bull Dancers performed twelve dances. Members of the tribe dressed as "a horde of grizzly bears, swans, beavers, wolves, vultures, rattlesnakes, bald eagles, and antelopes"; these tribe members then danced and behaved in a manner like the animals themselves as women watching "appeased" predators with meat.

All of a sudden, The Foolish One – standing atop one of the lodges – screamed and then rushed the center clearing in a zig-zagging pattern. As he approached, he leaped over anyone who stood between him and women threw robes at him; anyone in the village who was able to play the role but did not were allowed to take a robe which had been thrown by following behind him. While in the village, he harassed the women of the tribe with his symbolic penis which the women retracted from and screamed at, drawing the Okipa Maker into the clearing. Holding up Lone Man's pipe, the Okipa Maker cast a spell on The Foolish One, allowing the women and children to escape briefly before The Foolish One began again. During this part of the ceremony, total silence was mandated; all festivities halted and the Black Mouth Society killed any dog that barked. Again, the pipe was held up and the women and children escaped again. The crowd laughed and began singing victory songs.

After a few tries, The Foolish One gave up; he then noticed the Bull Dancers and began to take his symbolic penis and mount them, mimicking the sexual motions of the buffalo. After four instances, he pretended to be exhausted. He then moved on to two men in the tribe dressed as women; one played the role of a "sensible" young woman – representing a figure who had married the Moon and other goddesses – while the other was considered "foolish", representing a figure who had married the Sun. During this act, the audience laughed as he approached the sensible woman who rejects his advances, while the foolish girl readily accepts them.

The Foolish One's performance occurred four times during the third day of the ceremony during four of the twelve Bull Dances. At the end of the final one, the staff which controlled his symbolic penis was snapped in half. The staff now broken, the women of the tribe were no longer afraid and they encircled him, taunting him for his lustfulness as they moved. After breaking his staff into many pieces, one woman stole the symbolic penis and they all drove The Foolish One out of the village, throwing rocks and other debris at him. (Note: It is unclear precisely how the staff was initially broken. Bowers (1950) reports that The Foolish One broke it by trying to enter the Medicine Lodge, the door being too narrow for his staff to go in crosswise, which breaks the spell of fear he has over the women of the tribe and instigates the women driving him out. Harrod (1995) indicates that the women simply chased him and broke his staff, while Fenn (2014) states that, after the women encircle him, one woman grabs the staff from him and breaks it over her knee.) Two men with rights to the role followed him as he washed his paint off. Back in the village, the woman who stole his symbolic penis wrapped it in sagebrush and touted it through the village, carrying it like a baby as she herself was carried by four of the women towards the entrance to the Medicine Lodge. She proclaimed to the village from atop a lodge that "she had the power of creation, and of life and death over them; that she was the father of all the [buffalo], and that she could make them come or stay away as she pleased". She was then honored by several old men in the village who affirmed her power and lauded her victory over The Foolish One.

The fifth dance saw the emergence of the fasters from the Medicine Lodge. Through the two main skewers either on the back or chest, they were tied to the top of a long pole which had been set up south of the cedar post and then forced to run around it. During each successive dance, another faster was exchanged for the other.

=== Fourth day ===
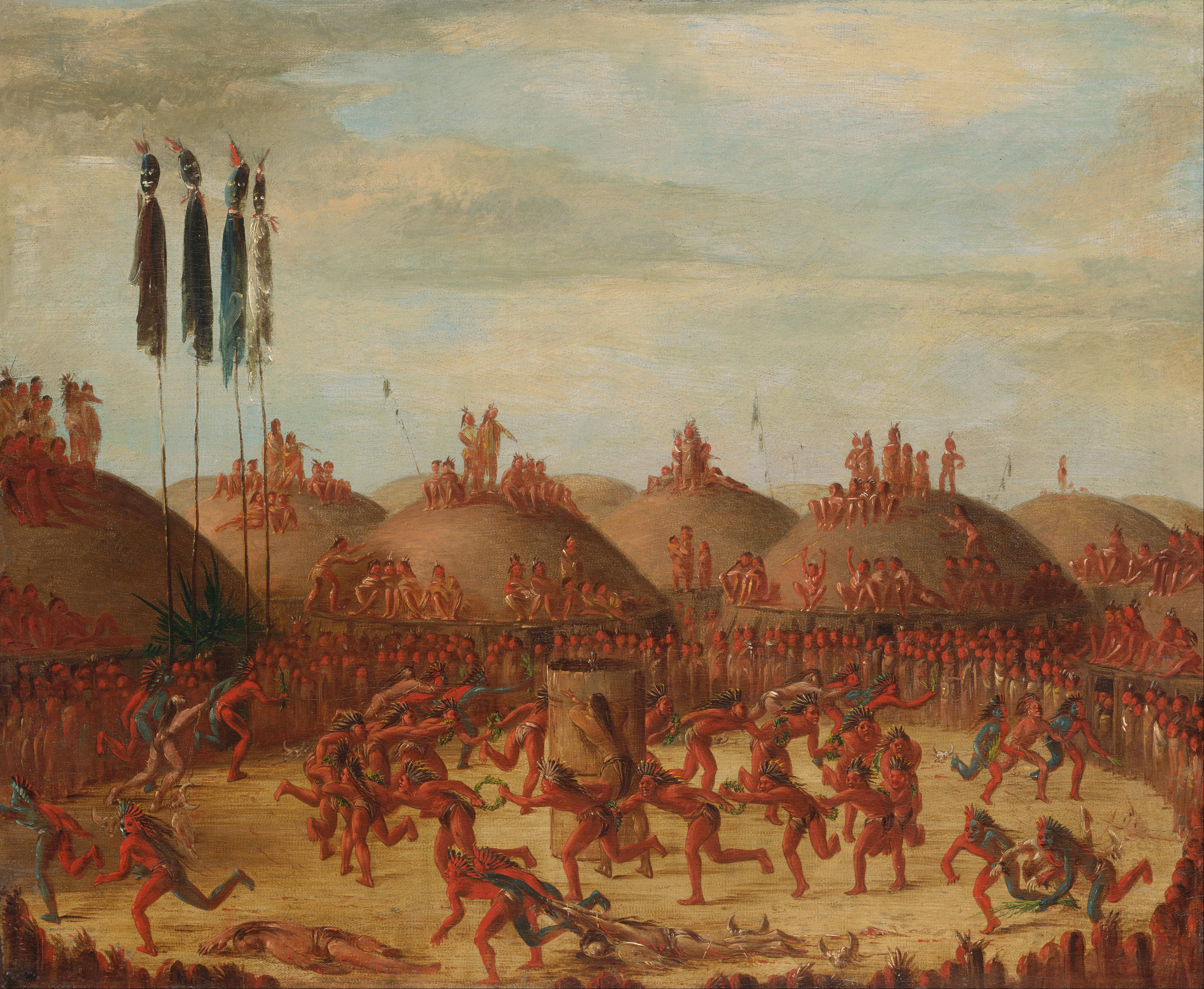
The Last Race by George Catlin (1832), depicting the emergence of the fasters from the Medicine Lodge

The fourth day of the ceremony was known as "the Hunting Day", the culmination of the ritual torture the fasters endured. The Bull Dancers had their number reduced to four, the strongest and bravest fighters in the village, but the process of painting and dressing them remained the same; young men continued to refresh the willows in the Medicine Lodge. The day had sixteen dances in total and, while the Okipa Maker emerged with the drummers, rattlers, and Bull Dancers, no fasters emerged with them for the first fifteen. The Bull Dancers danced once for each clan, bellowing as their names were called out.

The fasters and the Okipa Maker emerged for the last dance. (Note: Bowers reports that when night fell on the third day, any faster who had gone through the torture left the Medicine Lodge and that there were often no more than two left; other times the Okipa Maker was the only one.) Again, they were sliced through the chest or back by their clan father, with the insertion of wooden splints attached to leather strips. They were then suspended into the air in the Medicine Lodge and weighed down with buffalo skulls and other heavy objects in order to induce the most pain. The fasters chanted prayers and were spun until they became unconscious. The fasters were then lowered to the ground and, once conscious, presented their left hands to a masked figured painted in red with black hands and feet. Holding their hands on a buffalo skull in the lodge, the masked figure then cut the little finger off each of the fasters. A few offered their left index finger in the same manner and it too was removed, which was considered a greater sacrifice, though the most powerful sacrifice was the removal of the right little finger.

After the dance, the musicians changed some instruments and the Speckled Eagle figure followed them with gourd rattles, singing songs in the unintelligible dialect of the Nuptadi band into the Medicine Lodge. Inside the lodge, the men sang four songs, stomped in imitation of the buffalo escaping Dog Den Butte, and shuffled the turtle drums around before carrying them out to the cedar post. From there, the tribe's hunters formed a line south of the Bull Dancers and the Lone Man figure, facing the entrance of the Medicine Lodge. The Bull Dancers danced towards the Speckled Eagle figure four times, once for each time Speckled Eagle had sent them to investigate the starving Mandan during his capture of the animals. The hunters then speared the dancers in the legs as they were "sent out" by the Speckled Eagle figure; this was exceptionally injurious to the Bull Dancers and among the most painful aspects of the ceremony. The Bull Dancers then collapsed on the ground.

The dancers then formed the four cardinal directions in front of the Medicine Lodge's entrance, bellowing first from the east, then west, then north, then south, representing the universality of the buffalo and the four seasons; north stood for buffalo during the winter months, south for summer, east for spring, and west for fall. The Speckled Eagle figure then moved them to those positions around the cedar post. The drummers then increased the tempo of the music dramatically and the Bull Dancers discarded their adornments and began dancing as quickly as they could around the center clearing. The hunters formed a smaller circle nearer to the cedar post, holding themselves together with wreathes of willow.

In an event called "the Last Race", fasters were then ushered by two members of their father's clan with honorable war records – painted red on the left side of their bodies and blue on the right – into the main clearing and ran clockwise around the cedar post, dragging the buffalo skulls behind them. The fasters would run until the buffalo skulls were ripped from their flesh. If a faster collapsed before then, the clan fathers would pick him up and drag him until it was complete, leaving massive ritual scars. When the last faster had completed the ordeal, the drumming stopped and the hunters threw their wreathes skyward. When the fasters had returned to the Medicine Lodge, they were given healing rubs for their wounds; buffalo bone marrow for the Buffalo moiety and ground yellow corn for the Corn moiety. The ceremony ended with an offering to Grandfather Snake; the Okipa Maker took the knives the fasters had given him and threw them in the Missouri River. He then handed everyone who participated in a role some of the articles he had received in preparation for the ceremony and declared the Okipa over.

=== Walking with the Buffalo ===
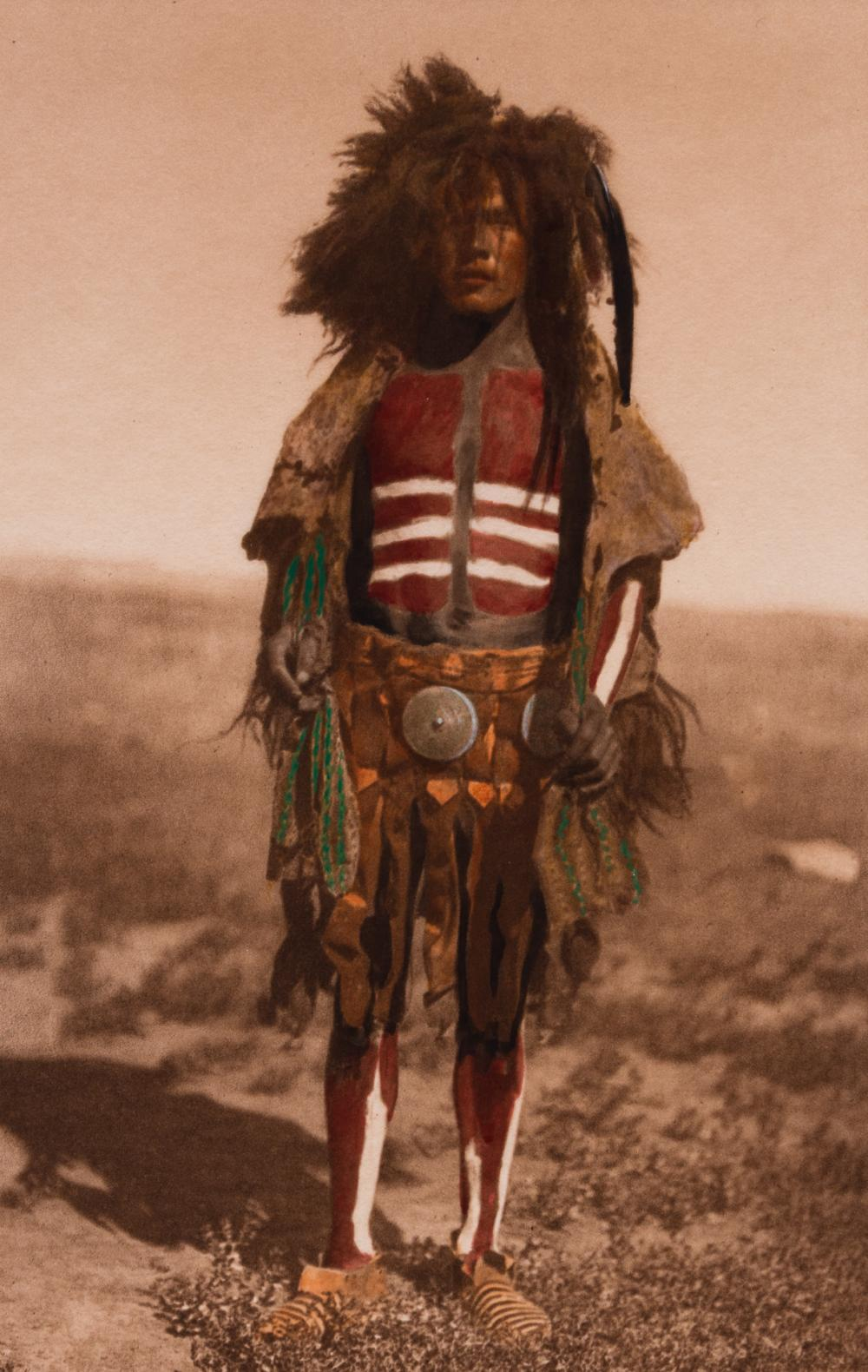
Bull Dancers were a major component of Walking with the Buffalo (picture taken and colorized by Edward S. Curtis, c. 1909)

Although it is unclear if it was strictly a part of the Okipa itself, an event known as "Walking with the Buffalo" occurred right after. (Note: Sources are split on whether this was a part of the ceremony itself. Howard L. Harrod (1995, 2000) indicates that it was "an essential part" of the Okipa, while Fenn (2014) states that it was a distinct ceremony, but was generally held shortly thereafter.) The women of the tribe treated the Bull Dancers to a large feast, while non-participants returned to their lodges. After they ate, the Bull Dancers smoked from a pipe as several young married women of the tribe danced for them, led by the woman who had captured The Foolish One's symbolic penis. Along with these dances, which spiritually transformed the women into female buffalo, the songs they sang were explicitly sexual and were intended to sexually excite both the women and the men. The leader of the women took a small stick and rubbed her clitoris. She then handed the stick to one of the dancers whom she was courting and said: "Smell of that, old man; it will make you young again: I am a heifer, a young buffalo heifer." She and the dancer left the confines of the village and performed ritual sexual intercourse; the other women and dancers followed suit. When the process had completed, the participants and those who had had a major role in the Okipa entered a sweat lodge, which ushered in a sense of renewal. The dancers smoked a "pipe of reconciliation" with the husbands of the women they had had sex with, promising abundant gifts. The husbands were socially required to accept this reconciliation.

Sexual power was believed to be passed on from the Bull Dancer to the woman, and then to the woman's husband, increasing their supernatural energy known as xópini which drained as they hunted or went to war. (Note: Fenn (2014) spells the term as xo'pini. For the modern orthography, see Kasak (2024).) This power was believed to be derived from the buffalo themselves. Although the dancers were typically the subject of the sexual ritual, important guests who were believed to be rich in xópini were also allowed to partake; James Kipp, George Catlin, and two men they were with were invited to participate. The ceremony was exhausting and, according to Catlin, a participant in the ceremony could have as many as twelve "excursions" with different liaisons. While the men symbolically became buffalo, these sexual rites were seen as literally reproducing buffalo for the hunt. It was also believed that this rite brought herds of buffalo closer to the village. The Walking with the Buffalo changed the execution of the Okipa; the Bull Dancers were painted differently based on whether it was expected that the Walking would occur.

== History ==
=== George Catlin ===
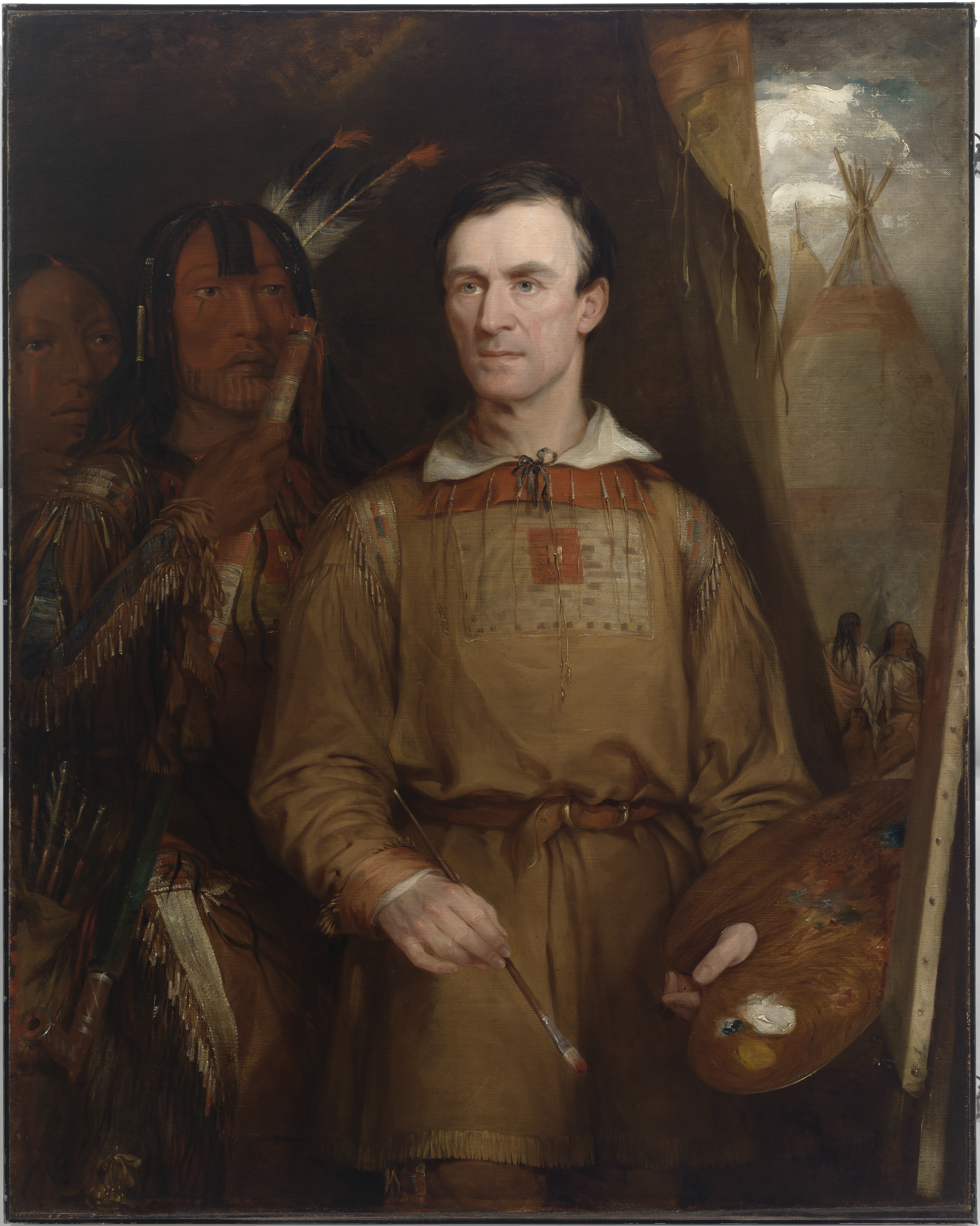
George Catlin provided the first written account of the Okipa (portrait by William Fisk, 1849).

The American painter George Catlin was the first to provide a written account of the Okipa, though he was not the first non-Indian to observe it. (Note: Catlin does describe himself as such, however, writing in 1865: "I was the first white man who ever witnessed the extraordinary ceremony, celebration, or installation, which I am now about to describe. It is called by the Mandans O-kee-pa.") He traveled with James Kipp, a Canadian-born fur trader, who served as his Mandan-language interpreter. Catlin arrived at the Mandan village a week prior to the Okipa commencement by chance, earning the goodwill of the tribe by painting their portraits. When the tribe convened to discuss whether Catlin's work was detrimental to the tribe, Kipp argued on his behalf and both men were allowed to view the ceremony from inside the Medicine Lodge. Although he first saw the ceremony in 1832, he published a travelog of his eight years among numerous Native Indian tribes entitled Letters and Notes on the Manners, Customs, and Conditions of the North American Indians in 1841.

He later published an anonymous pamphlet in 1865 entitled Account of an Annual Ceremony Practised by the Mandan Tribe of North American Indians, which described the ceremony and detailed thoroughly the sexual rites. Catlin denied authorship, but modern scholars are in uniform agreement that he wrote it; the wording used and the context in which the author came to observe the ceremony make Catlin the only possible author. Two years later, Catlin wrote a book – this time using his name – entitled O-kee-pa: A Religious Ceremony; and Other Customs of the Mandans, which served as another account of the Okipa. The book contained a removable section which described the sexual rites of the ceremony.

Although Catlin brought popular attention to the Okipa, several scholars have criticized his recounting of events. During his own time, Catlin had a dispute with Henry Rowe Schoolcraft over the accuracy of Catlin's work regarding the ceremony. Schoolcraft published a six-volume attack on Catlin's work between 1851 and 1857, funded by the United States Congress. In it, Schoolcraft criticized Catlin's support of the Madoc theory, the pseudohistorical belief that the Americas were discovered by the Welsh prince Madoc; Catlin believed that the Mandan were descended from Madoc's voyage based on superficial similarities. Schoolcraft also pointed out that Catlin described the Mandan as having been wiped out by the 1837 smallpox outbreak, which severely lowered their numbers but did not lead to their extinction. Although Kipp and Catlin had reportedly fallen out, Kipp supported Catlin against Schoolcraft; in a letter to Secretary Joseph Henry of the Smithsonian Institution, Kipp defended the works as "important to science and to the ethnology of this country [...] in portraying and perpetuating the customs of the dying races of man in America". Schoolcraft's invective may have been partially the result of a personal slight; he had previously asked Catlin to illustrate for his books, an offer Catlin refused.

Some modern scholars have also cast doubts on part of Catlin's retelling; Joshua David Bellin has pointed out that Catlin's work contains curiously long quotes in the Mandan language, where nowhere else in his oeuvre does he show any level of fluency in any Native American language. The American photographer Edward S. Curtis reported that Kipp's fluency in the language was largely based on his experience in fur trading. Nevertheless, the American anthropologist W. Raymond Wood has defended Kipp's translations, arguing that "without [Kipp's] help, Catlin's record at the Mandan village would have been immeasurably impoverished". Bellin has also criticized Catlin for profiting off of sensationalism and Indian stereotypes, writing that Catlin's traveling shows were a forerunner to the work of P. T. Barnum and Buffalo Bill; Catlin and Barnum even worked together at one point, though it was short-lived since neither one trusted the other. The American historian Dan Flores has called Catlin's comprehension of the event "poorly grasped" even though it made the ceremony fairly well-known.

Despite these criticisms, other reports have corroborated much of what Catlin described. The American ethnologist John C. Ewers evaluated the claims Catlin made against the reports of other non-Indian observers and argues that Catlin's account should be treated as truthful. Henry Boller, a fur trader and clerk, saw part of the ceremony in 1858, though he missed the last day and thus did not report Walking with the Buffalo. He added additional information, like that the main clearing was cleaned by the women of the tribe and that the fasters were attached to poles outside the Medicine Lodge, but overall the account lines up with Catlin's. Boller also reported that a faster's flesh had to rot around the inserted wooden splints before he could be released to run the Last Race. The last non-Indian to report having seen the Okipa in person was Henry E. Maynadier, a then-lieutenant in the United States Army, in August 1860. He reported similarly, though he said a woman in mourning helped open the ceremony and that she showed signs of scarification herself. Maynadier also reports the torture occurring outside the Medicine Lodge, though he says some were attached to the local scaffolding. Other second-hand reports have also confirmed elements of Catlin's reporting, including a 1862 report by Lewis Henry Morgan which described The Foolish One, replete with black paint and the symbolic penis. Washington Matthews, a military surgeon, was stationed at Fort Buford not far from Like-a-Fishhook Village between 1869 and 1872; he reported that the central clearing, the Medicine Lodge, and the Big Canoe were all still in practical use.

=== Evolution ===
Although it was practiced until 1889, the Okipa changed and shifted over time before finally being outlawed by Indian agents in 1890. Six of the clans were wiped out by smallpox: the three unnamed clans, Masedomak, Amakadomak, and Manakasanumak. After the 1837 smallpox outbreak, Tamixixiks later joined the Tamisik clan, and Matodomak and Hoxexekanumak either died out or merged with Sipuskanumak, leaving only four surviving clans. How these losses in clans affected the rite varied; at least one village continued to call out the names of the dead clans, while at Fort Clark they dropped six from the roll-call. Another band, Awigaxas, were added to the rite in the 18th century, just before the first major smallpox outbreak.

It is similarly unclear if there was always an occupant of the Medicine Lodge when it was not in use; George Catlin's account of the event after he witnessed it in the 1830s indicates that it remained empty. During the last ceremony ever performed, there were only three members of the tribe who owned the appropriate medicine bundles, one of whom was a woman. The painting of the lodge thus fell to the two men and two Hidatsa men who had analogous bundles in their culture.

The dismemberment of the fingers was effectively extinct by 1837, at least as a part of the Okipa; it remained popular for certain kinds of fasting or during the mourning period, however. The recision of this rite from the ceremony apparently stemmed from a revelatory dream in which a member of the tribe was told that the fingers were needed in order to use the newly-introduced firearms. The final years the Mandan occupied Like-a-Fishhook saw the fasters no longer hoisted by lassos in the same fashion they had been; instead, they were hung on the rafters of a "corn scaffold" near the entrance of the lodge. During its final iterations, the fasters were hooked by the skewers outside at a pole between the Medicine Lodge and the sacred cedar, and no longer hoisted into the air.

Mandan hunters and trappers extended the fasting and part of the torture elements of the Okipa during their expeditions following unification with the Hidatsa. However, repeated violations of the ceremony by the Hidatsa, mostly by the tribe's women, changed the nature of suffering in Mandan culture; torture and associated visions became less and less at the focal point of the Okipa and became more hermitic. The Okipa partially influenced the Sun Dance commonly celebrated by members of other Plains Indians, especially the neighboring Cheyenne's. Several elements of the Sun Dance have been described as deriving from the Okipa, including sexual power exchanges, intricate body painting, and submission to torture as a rite of passage.

=== In popular culture ===
In a scene of the 1970 Western film A Man Called Horse, the film's main character undergoes the torture ritual of the Okipa. However, it is misrepresented as being a ritual of the Sioux.

== See also ==
- White Buffalo Cow Society
