= Suspension (body modification) =

Body modification

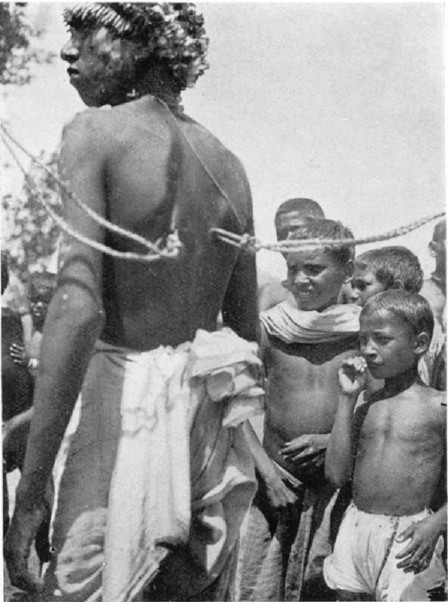
Indian man with hooks in his back at the festival of Charak-Puja

Body suspension is the act of rigging a human body to hang from implements that have been placed through temporary perforations in the skin.

A number of health concerns might be associated with the practice, such as excessive bleeding, fainting, fall injuries, and infections.

== History ==
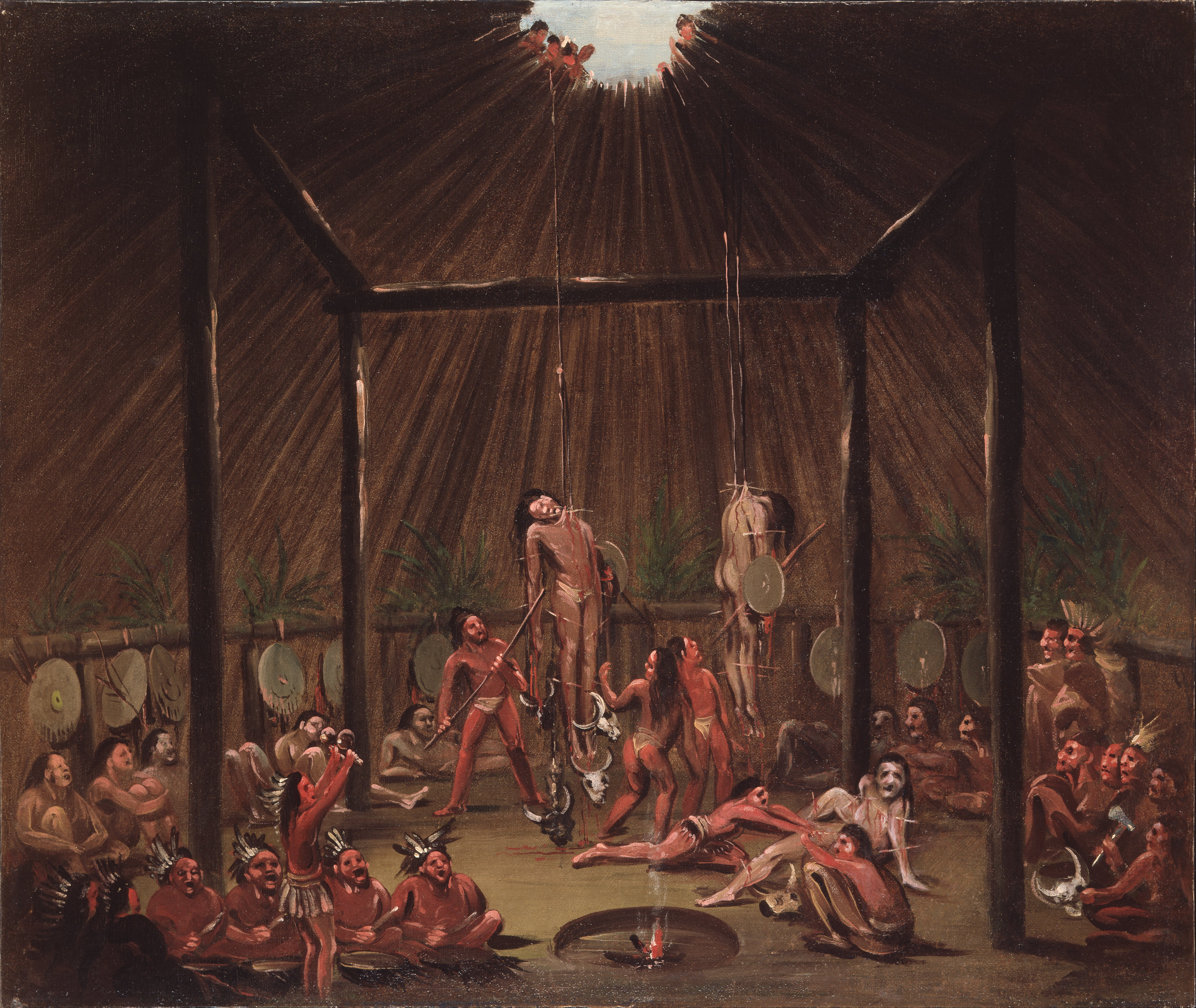
"The Cutting Scene, Mandan O-kee-pa Ceremony" by George Catlin, circa 1832

Body suspension has historically been practiced by different cultures around the world. The Thaipusam festival, celebrated by the Tamil Hindu community on the full moon in the Tamil month of Thai (January/February), features body suspension. The Charak Puja, a Hindu folk festival in honour of the god Shiva or Dharmathakur, also features body suspension.

In North America, the Okipa ceremony - which includes piercing and suspension - has been a major part of Mandan religious life. This ceremony of the Plains Indians tribe first became known outside the tribe in 1832. This complex ceremony about the creation of the earth was glimpsed, and then aspects of it depicted for a non-Native public, by painter George Catlin. The piercing and suspension is only one part of the Okipa ceremony.

Modern-day suspensions, as performed by non-Natives, are influenced by the Modern Primitivism movement and based on imitations of Catlin's artwork combined with the experimental creations of fellow performance artists. Artists involved in creating modern suspension experiences include Allen Falkner, who first introduced suspension as a secular activity; the researcher Stelarc, who performed suspensions in the 70s and 80s, including hanging himself between skyscrapers, Fakir Musafar (Roland Loomis), and singer Miguel.

== Method ==
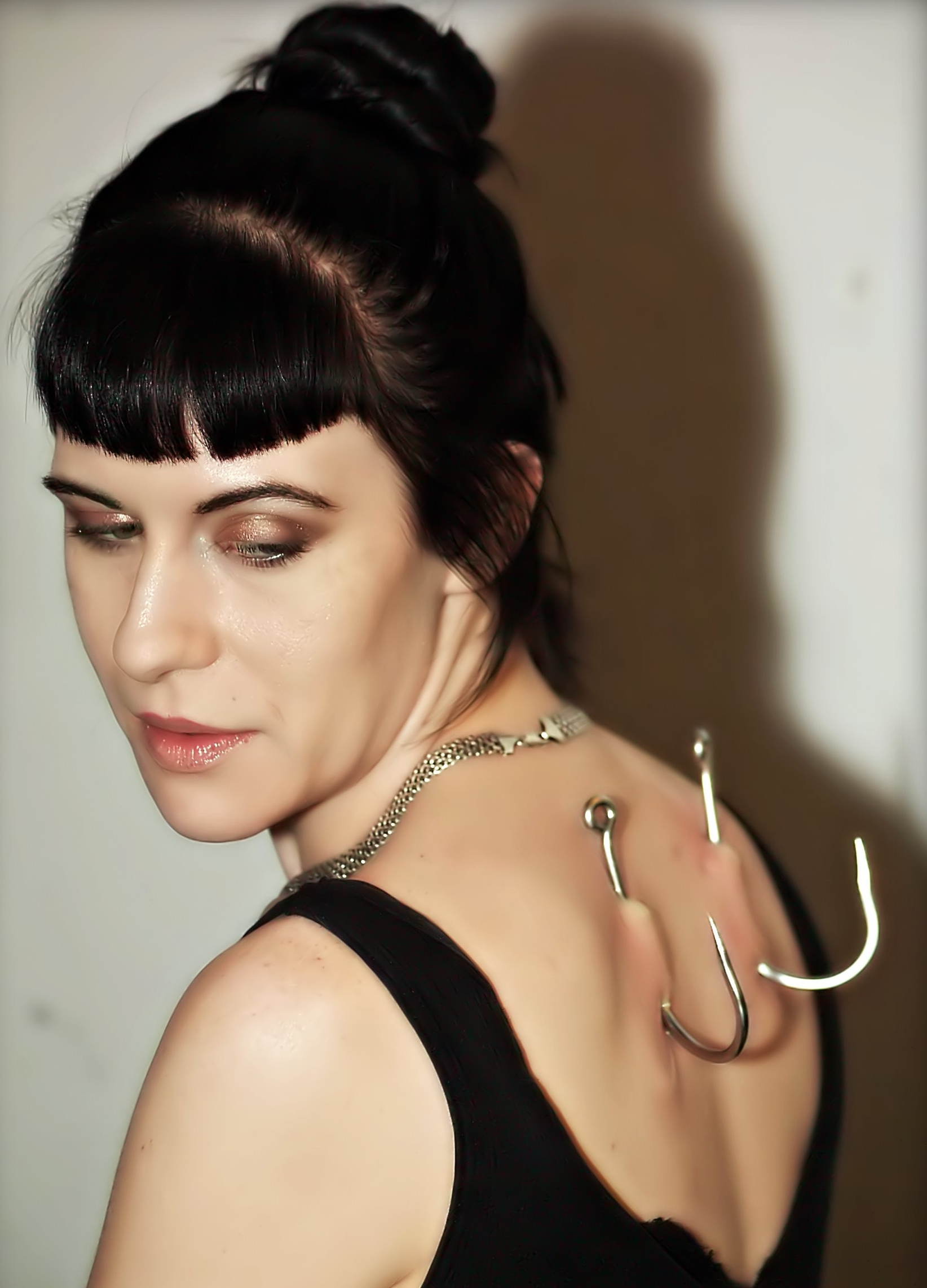
Two body hooks inserted in the back of a woman, to which suspension chain is yet to be attached

If the number of hooks are too few, the suspended individual's skin will be unable to withstand the body's weight and will rip.

=== Types of suspensions ===
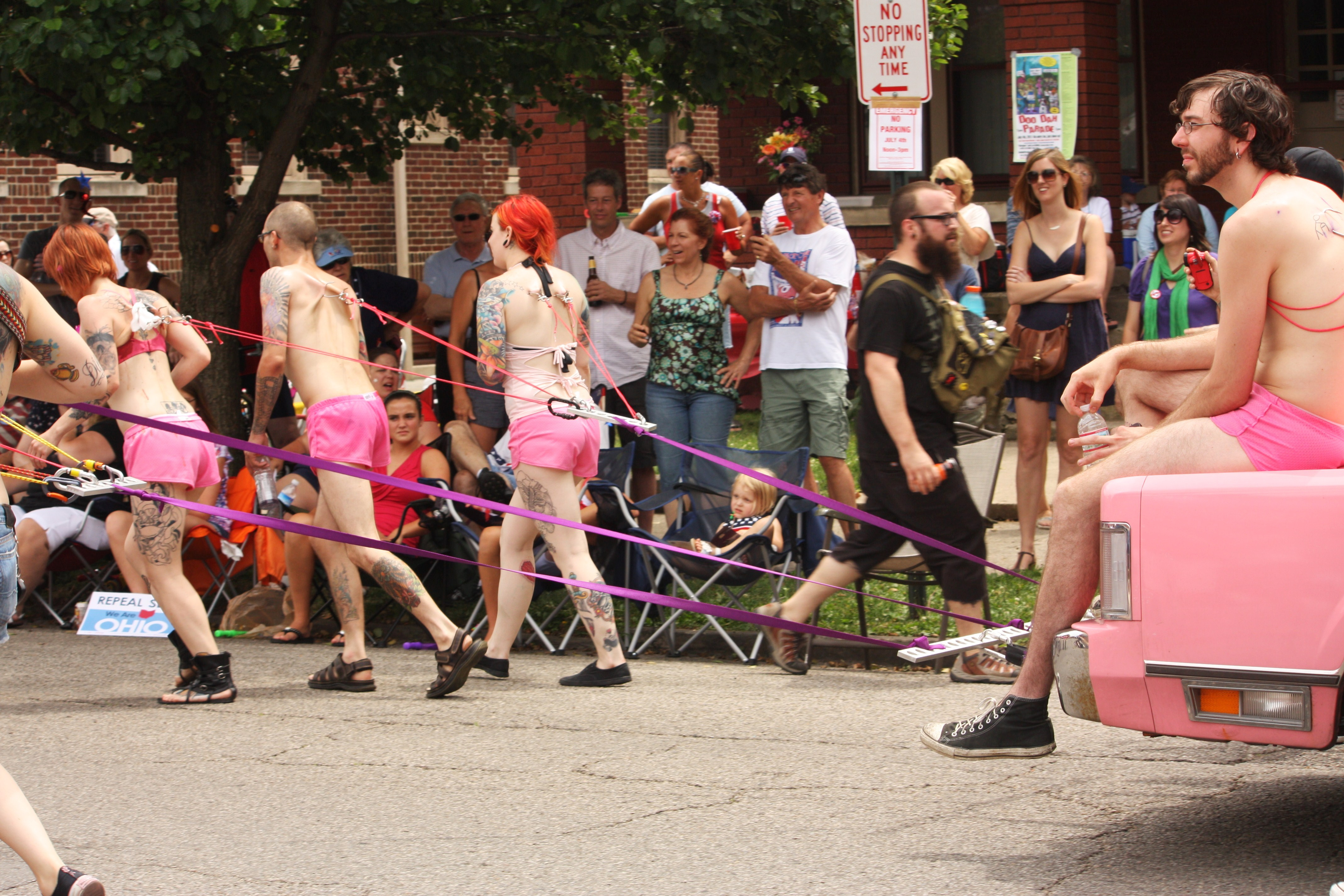
Men and women pulling a car using ropes attached to flesh hooks inserted in their backs. The participants are not suspended from top in this case. Scene from Doo Dah Parade, California, USA, 2011.

=== Chest ===
A chest suspension, sometimes incorrectly referred to as an "O-Kee-Pa", is a suspension in which the hook(s) are placed in the chest. Typically two hooks are used for this type of suspension. This was initially named after the Okipa ceremony of the Mandan people, and popularized under that name by Fakir Musafar. The modern, secular suspension performance, however, is not an accurate replication of the Okipa ceremony. In respect to the Mandan people, the "O-Kee-Pa" name is no longer used to reference this position.

=== Coma ===
A coma suspension is a suspension in which the hooks are placed in the chest, torso and legs, usually in two rows, such that the suspendee is lying face up. The name of this position comes from the similar imagery in the movie Coma.

=== Knee ===
This suspension takes place hooked from the knees and hung vertically with the head closest to the ground and the knees at the top. There is no standard for hook placement on this suspension, as it depends almost solely on the anatomy of the suspendee. Some people refer to this as a "Falkner" suspension since Allen Falkner is the first known person to ever attempt this particular configuration. This style is relatively new, but is quickly growing in popularity. It is not considered to be an extremely painful suspension, but the drawbacks include lower back pain and ripping of skin in the areas around the knees. Another factor of this suspension is the increased blood pressure to the brain due to the inverted position, which can lead to disorientation and cause headaches.

=== Back ===
A Back suspension is a suspension in which the hook(s) are placed in the upper back, such that the suspendee is hanging upright. This type of suspension used to be known as a suicide suspension due to its similarity in appearance to someone who has hanged themselves. However, this name has been phased out in many suspension communities.

=== Resurrection ===
A resurrection suspension is a suspension in which the suspended person is held up by hooks, usually in two rows on the belly; it gives the impression of rising from death as the suspendee is curved backwards facing up.

=== Crucifix ===
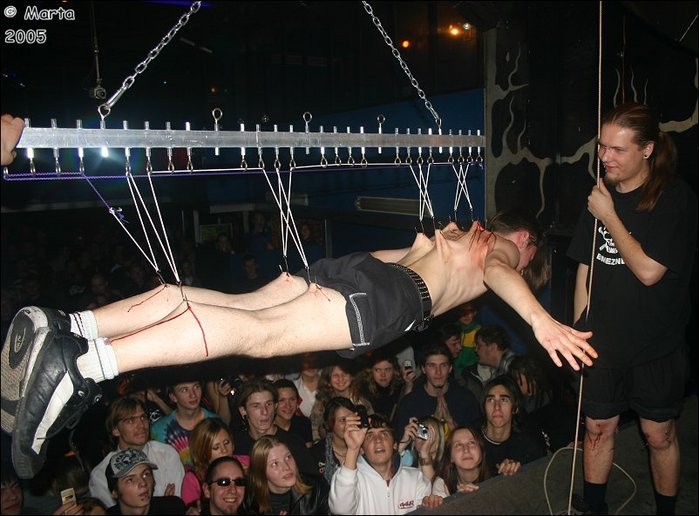
Hook suspension at an event

A crucifix suspension is a variation on a back suspension in which hooks are also placed in the arms, such that the suspendee appears to be hanging on a cross, with his or her arms held out to the side.

=== Superman ===
A superman suspension is the inverse of a coma suspension - the hooks are placed in the back and legs, usually in two rows, such that the suspendee is lying face down. This type of suspension is named superman due to the similarity in appearance to Superman flying.

=== Other ===
Other variations exist, using any number from one to dozens of hooks. The rebirth suspension is usually performed with 4 to 6 hooks in the back, with the suspendee in the fetal position, face down. Some hang from calves, ankles, knees, or buttocks. This can even include facial suspension. The "Angel" Suspension is six or eight hooks in the back where the outline of an angel's wings would be.

== See also ==
- Body modification
- Fakir Musafar
- Modern primitive
- Play piercing
- Suspension bondage
