= Spill vase =

Vase to hold wooden tapers

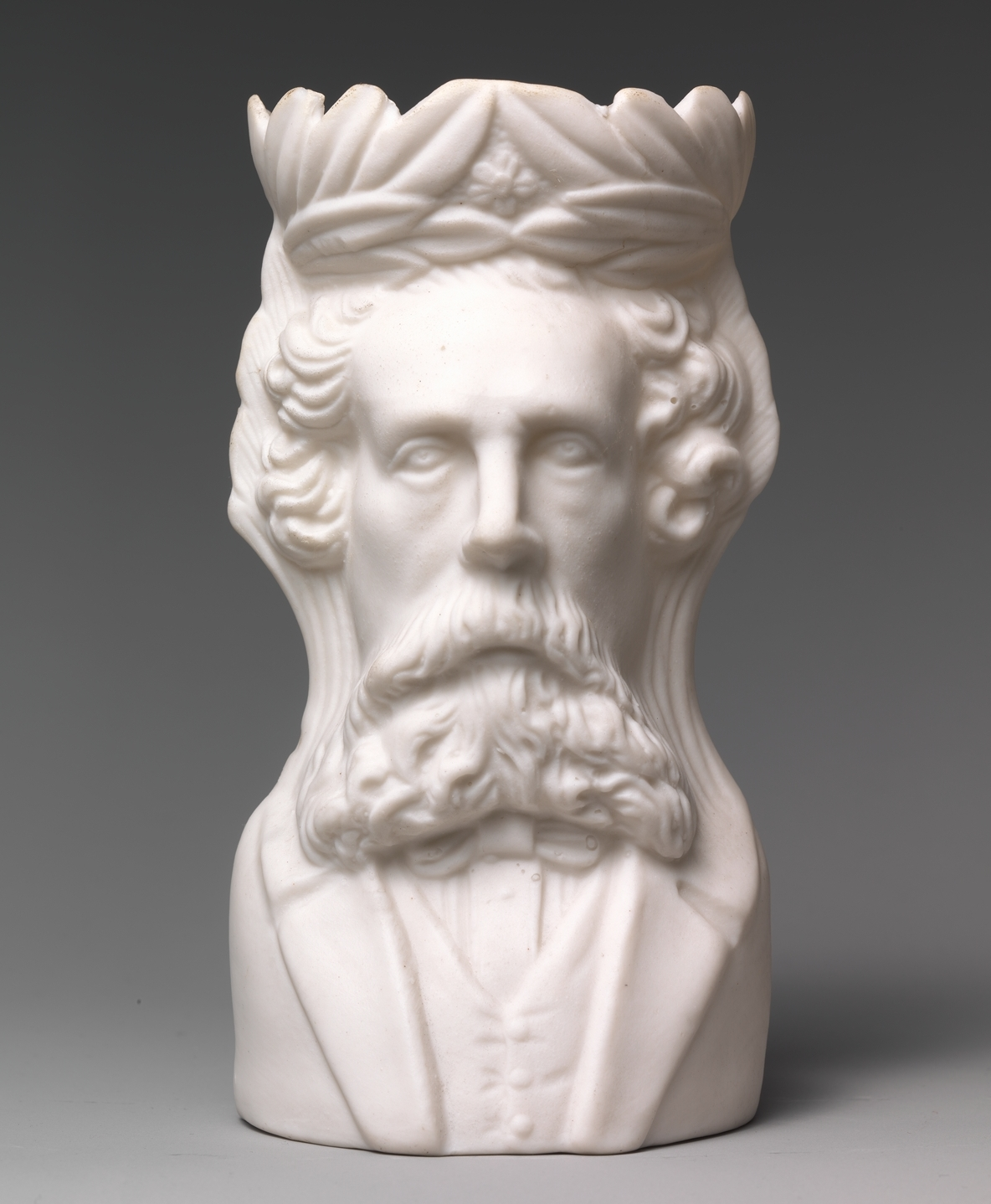
19th-century American spill vase in Parian porcelain

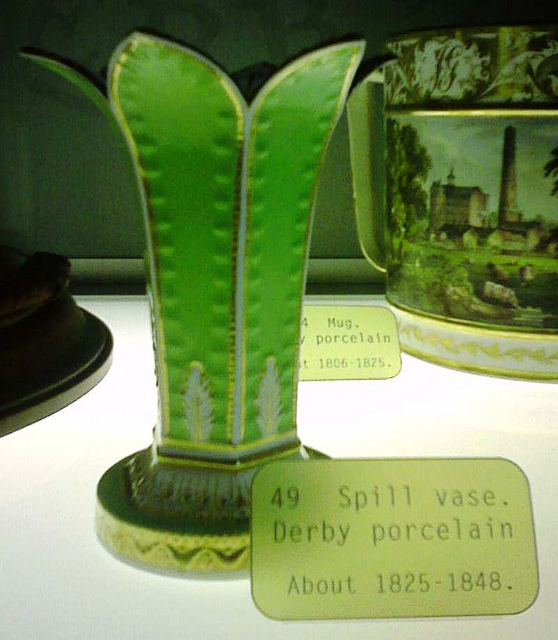
A mid-19th century Derby porcelain spill vase from the Derby Museum, United Kingdom.

A spill vase, or spill holder is a small cylindrical vase or wall-hanging vase for containing splints, spills, and tapers for transferring fire, for example to light a candle or pipe from a lit fire. From the documentary record, they probably date back to the 15th century, though the heyday of specially made vases is the 19th century. Spills are made of tightly rolled paper tapers or very thin wood sticks; spill vases are mostly made of pottery, including porcelain, but a variety of other materials were used, such as wood, iron, brass, or even wall paper. There are also some examples made in glass, although these are mostly limited to the 1840s-50s.

== Purpose ==
A spill vase was usually kept on the mantelpiece and was filled with spills used to transfer fire from the fireplace to candles, lamps, a pipe or a cigar. Commercial matches, which first surfaced in England during the 1820s, were a relatively expensive commodity until the late 19th century, and spill was therefore a more cost effective solution.

== Design ==
Some examples of spill vases have a rectangular holder for a matchbox, which allowed the user to light a single splint, or sliver of wood with the match and use the spill to transfer the fire to several candles.

Apart from just using small vase shapes, designers found a number of ingenious solutions to the problem of a design needing an upward-facing hole with some depth, and many designs were figural, with the spills going into the top of a head, a tree stump, and so on.

== Decline ==
From 1860 to 1865 there was a huge transitional period in the evolution of lighting and accessories. Later, with the spread of electricity, spill vases gradually became redundant, as people relied less on fire for lighting. However they later became expensive collectibles on the antiques market.

Agatha Christie refers to spill vases in her story "The Mysterious Affair at Styles" thus: "Poirot had walked over to the mantel-piece... his hands, which from long force of habit were mechanically straightening the spill vases on the mantel-piece, were shaking violently."

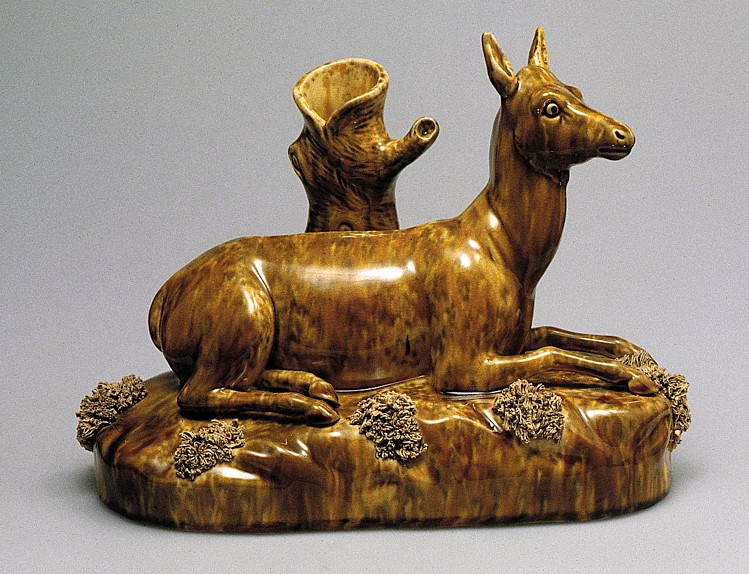
American, 1849

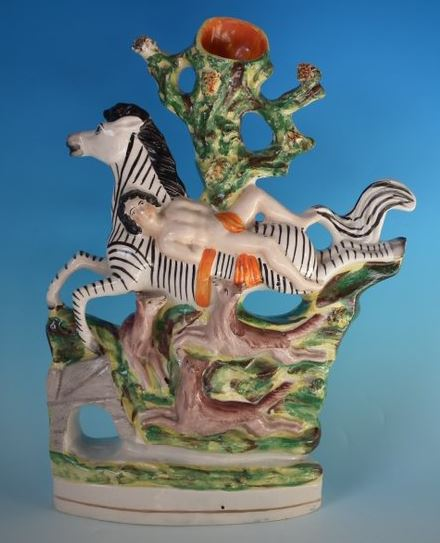
Staffordshire figure, c. 1860, depicting the punishment accorded to Mazeppa, after the popular poem by Lord Byron. The artist has been unable to resist turning the horse into a zebra

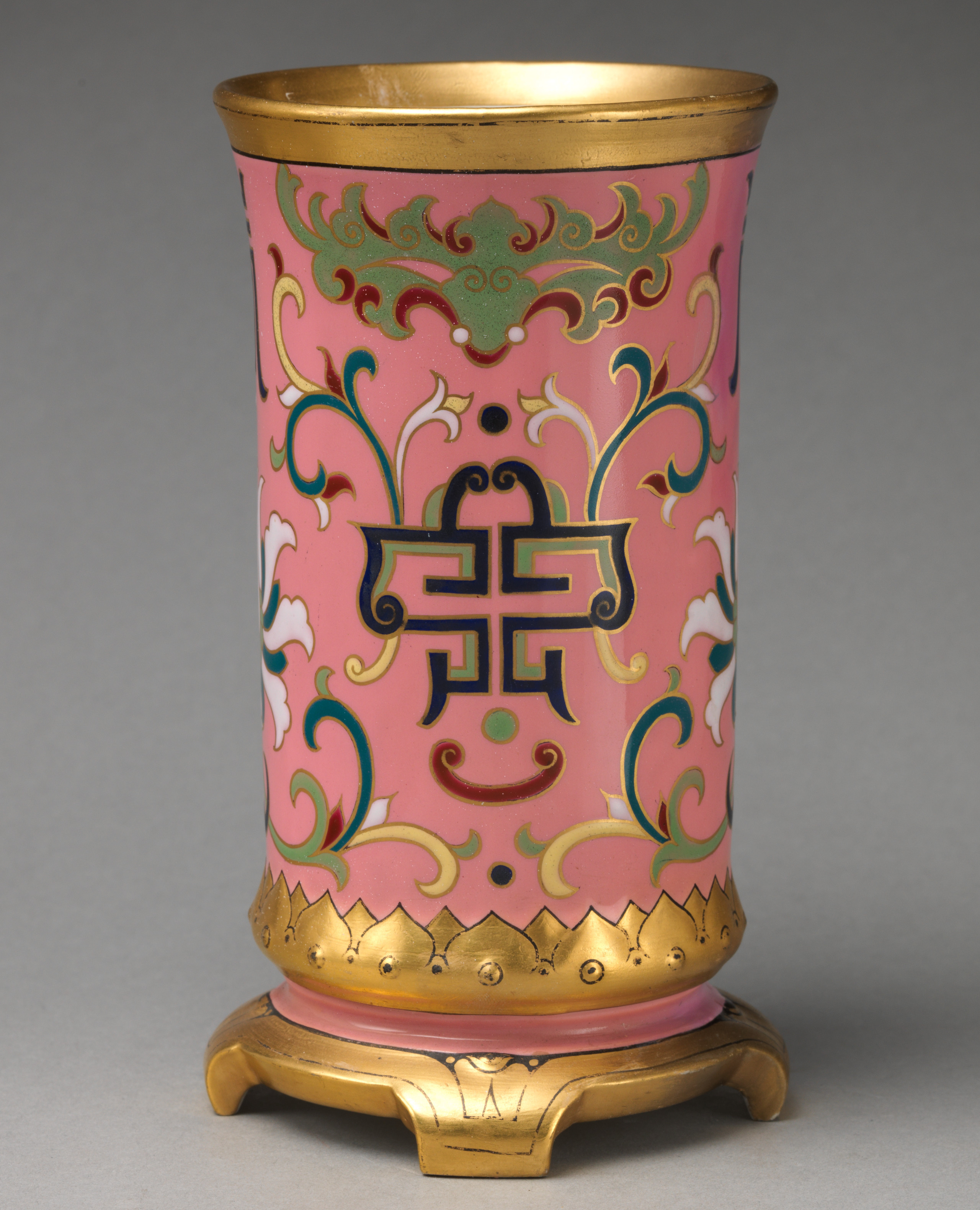
Mintons, England, 1869, bone china

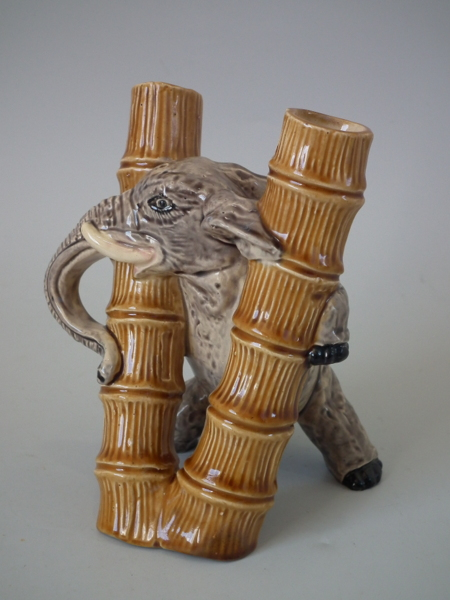
German, c. 1890

== See also ==
- Splint (laboratory equipment)
