= Allen Falkner =

American body modification artist

- Born: Charles Allen Huff II; April 17, 1969 (age 57)
- Occupations: Body Piercer, Suspension Practitioner, Performance Artist, Teacher
- Website: allenfalkner.com

Allen Falkner (born April 17, 1969) is an American suspension practitioner, body modification artist, teacher, business owner, and former performance artist. He is founder of TSD, the first suspension group. He is often referred to as the "Father of Modern Suspension" and is considered the first to bring body suspension to the mainstream.

== Career ==
Falkner has had many jobs since retiring from suspension performance in 2007. He's worked as a body piercer, body modification artist, laser tattoo remover, teacher, lecturer, and DJ. He owns a tattoo removal business, Fade Fast, and a bar, The Nines, both in Dallas, Texas.

He was hired to help realize the body suspension stunt of Criss Angel for his TV show Mindfreak in which he was suspended in suicide position from a helicopter flying over the mountains in the Valley of Fire.

He also appeared in the movie Modify.

== Personal life ==
In a 2008 interview, Falkner describes himself as "[coming] from a family of accountants." Despite being an honor student in elementary and middle school, he dropped out of high school and received his GED. He later went to college for computer science engineering but became a full time body piercer before finishing his degree. He currently resides in Dallas, Texas.
