= Splint (laboratory equipment) =

Sliver or splinter of resinous wood for burning and firelighting

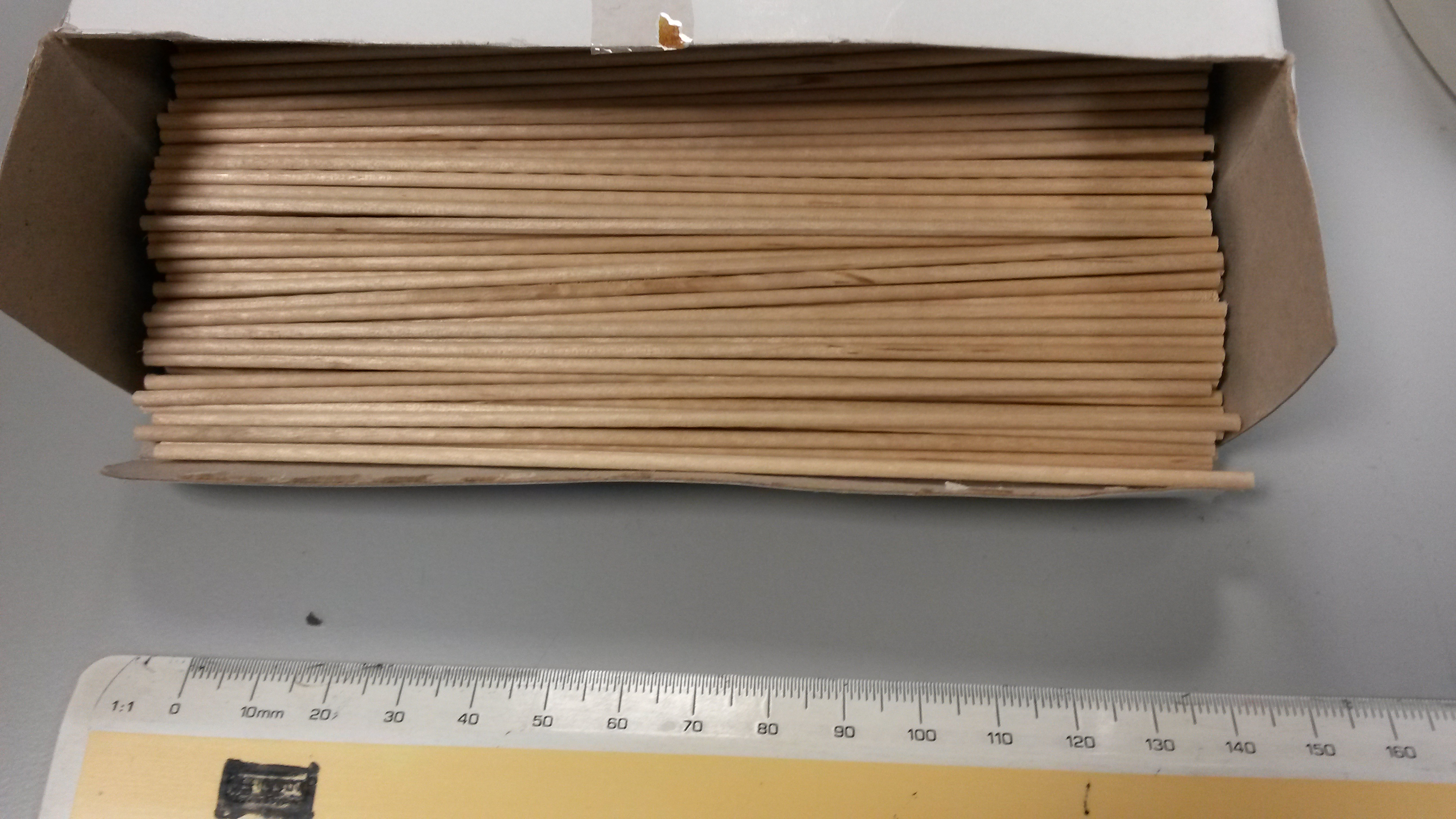
A box of cylindrical splints

A splint (or spill or splinter) is a simple piece of equipment used in scientific laboratories. Splints are typically long, thin strips of wood, about 6 inches (15 cm) long and ¼ inch (6 mm) wide, and are consumable but inexpensive. They are typically used for tasks such as lighting bunsen burners, as the length of the splint allows a flame to be lit without risk to the user's hand, should the burner flare back. Another use for splints are chemical identification of various gases, and splints are also used to teach simple chemical principles in schools and homes.

== Use in chemical identification ==
Glowing splint test: the first flask contains air, the second flask contains oxygen, the third flask contains an inert gas, such as nitrogen

Some gases are hard to distinguish by sight or smell alone. For example, hydrogen, oxygen and nitrogen are all colourless and odourless. Several laboratory experiments are capable of producing relatively pure gas as an end product, and it may be useful to demonstrate the chemical identity of that gas. Burning splints or glowing splints can be used to identify whether a gas is flammable, whether it is oxidising, or whether it is chemically inert.

These tests are not safe for completely unidentified gases, as the energy of their explosion could be beyond the safe confinement of a fragile glass tube. This means that they are really only useful as a demonstration of a gas that is already strongly suspected, and so is known to be safe. In a high school chemistry class, a typical use would be to show the presence of hydrogen (after electrolysis of water, or by reacting a metal with an acid).

=== Burning (or lighted) splint test ===
A splint is lit and held near the opening of the tube, then the stopper is removed to expose the splint to the gas.

If the gas is flammable, the mixture ignites. This test is most commonly used to identify hydrogen, which results with a distinctive 'squeaky pop' sound. Hydrogen is easily ignited and used to definitively conclude what the gas actually is. Further analytical chemistry techniques can clarify the identity of the gas in question.

=== Glowing splint test ===
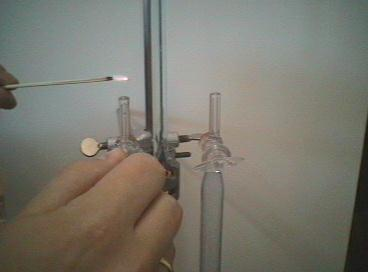
A glowing splint is held above a glass tube, in which oxygen gas is trapped.

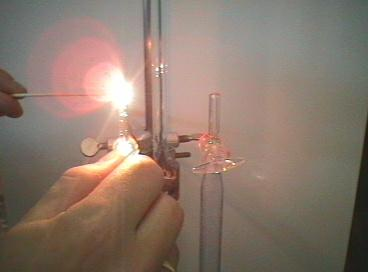
When the stopcock is opened, oxygen gas rushes out, and ignites the glowing splint.

Testing for oxygen with a glowing splint

The glowing splint test is a test for an oxidising gas, such as oxygen. In this test, a splint is lit, allowed to burn for a few seconds, then blown out by mouth or by shaking. Whilst the ember at the tip is still glowing hot, the splint is introduced to the gas sample that has been trapped in a vessel.

Upon exposure to concentrated oxygen gas, the glowing ember flares, and re-ignites to produce a sustained flame. The more concentrated the oxygen, the faster the wood burns, and the more intense the flame. This test is not specific for oxygen, but will react similarly for any oxidising gas (such as nitrous oxide) that supports the combustion of the splint.

== See also ==
- Flame test
- Spill vase
