= Mandan language =

Siouan language of North Dakota

Mandan
- Núu'etaa íroo
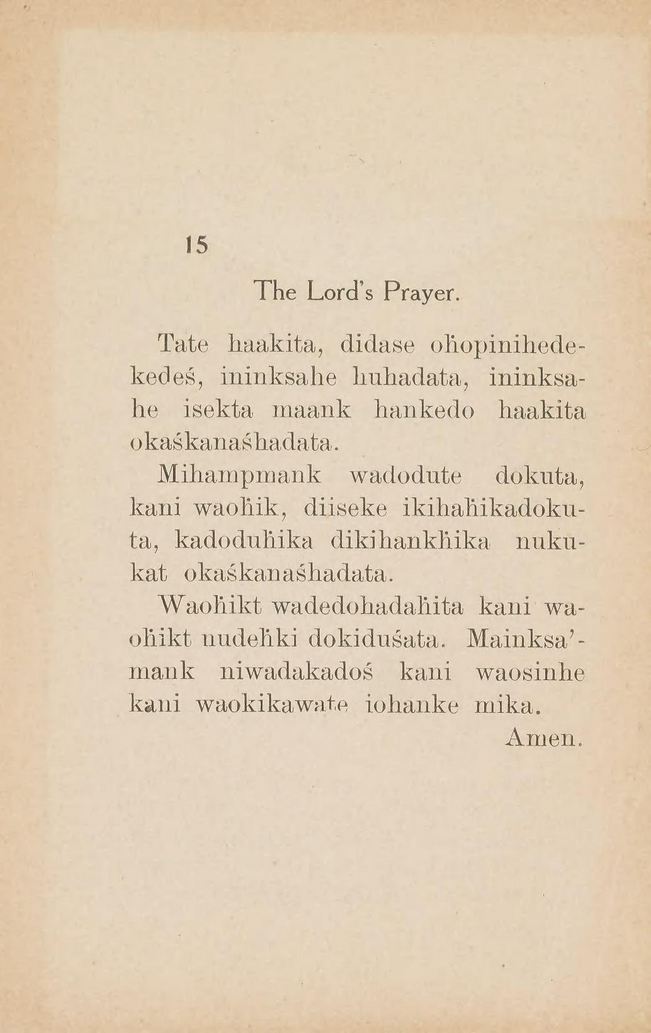
- The Lord's Prayer in Mandan (1905)
- Native to: United States
- Region: Fort Berthold Reservation, North Dakota
- Ethnicity: Mandan
- Extinct: 9 December 2016, with the death of Edwin Benson
- Revival: Taught at Fort Berthold Community College
- Language family: Siouan-Catawban: Siouan; Mandan
- Dialects: Núu'etaa; Rúptaare

Language codes
- ISO 639-3: mhq
- Glottolog: mand1446
- ELP: Mandan
- Linguasphere: 64-AAB-a

- Person: Núu'etaa numá'k
- People: Núu'etaare
- Language: Núu'etaa íroo
- Country: Núu'etaa Máa'ąke

Mandan (endonym: Núu'etaa íroo) is an extinct Siouan language native to the Mandan people of North Dakota in the United States, primarily spoken on the Fort Berthold Indian Reservation in the north-west of the state. It is a member of the Siouan language family, and has two main dialects: Núu’etaa/Nuu’etaare and Rúptaa/Rúptaare.

== Use and revitalization efforts ==
By 2009, there was just one fluent speaker of Mandan, Edwin Benson (1931–2016). The language is being taught in local school programs to encourage the use of the language. Prior to Benson's death, the Estonian linguist Indrek Park worked with him for more than two years to preserve the language as much as possible. The 2020 documentary To Save A Language portrays Park's efforts to revive the language.

Mandan is taught at Fort Berthold Community College along with the Hidatsa and Arikara languages. Linguist Mauricio Mixco of the University of Utah has been involved in fieldwork with remaining speakers since 1993. As of 2007, extensive materials in the Mandan language at the college and at the North Dakota Heritage Center, in Bismarck, North Dakota, remained to be processed, according to linguists.

The MHA Language Project has created language learning materials for Mandan, including a vocabulary app, a dictionary, and several books in the language. They also provide a summer learning institute and materials for teachers.

== Classification ==
Mandan was initially thought to be closely related to Hidatsa and Crow. However, since Mandan has had language contact with Hidatsa and Crow for many years, the exact relationship between Mandan and other Siouan languages (including Hidatsa and Crow) has been obscured and is currently undetermined. Thus, Mandan is most often considered to be a separate branch of the Siouan family.

Only the Nuptare variety survived into the 20th century, and all speakers were bilingual in Hidatsa. In 1999, there were only six fluent speakers of Mandan still alive. Edwin Benson, the last surviving fluent Mandan speaker, died in 2016.

The language received much attention from White Americans because of the supposedly lighter skin color of the Mandan people, which they speculated was due to an ultimate European origin. In the 1830s Prince Maximilian of Wied spent more time recording Mandan over all other Siouan languages and prepared a comparison list of Mandan and Welsh words (he thought that the Mandan might be displaced Welsh). The idea of a Mandan/Welsh connection was also supported by George Catlin.

Will and Spinden report that the medicine men had their own secret language.

== Phonology ==
Mandan has the following consonant phonemes:

	Labial	Alveolar	Post- alveolar	Velar	Glottal
Stop	p	t		k	ʔ
Fricative		s	ʃ	x	h
Sonorant	w	r			

/w/ and /r/ become [m] and [n] before nasal vowels, and /r/ is realized as [ⁿd] word-initially.

	Front				Central				Back			
	Oral		Nasal		Oral		Nasal		Oral		Nasal	
	short	long	short	long	short	long	short	long	short	long	short	long
Close	i	iː	ĩ	ĩː					u	uː	ũ	ũː
Mid	e	eː							o	oː		
Open					a	aː	ã	ãː				

== Grammar ==
Mandan is a subject–object–verb language.

Mandan has a system of allocutive agreement and so different grammatical forms may be used that depend on the gender of the addressee. Questions asked of men must use the suffix -oʔsha: the suffix -oʔną is used to ask of women. Likewise, the indicative suffix is -oʔsh to address men, -oʔre to address women. The same goes for the imperative: -ta (male), -ną (female).

Mandan verbs include a set of postural verbs, which encode the shapes of the subject of the verb:

wérex náako'sh
wérex ną́k-oʔsh
pot sit-PRESENT
'A pot was there (sitting).'

mí'tixtena téroomako'sh
mį́ʔti-xte-ną té-roomąkoʔsh
village-big-EMPHATIC stand-NARRATIVE.PAST
'There was a big village.'

máatah máakoomako'sh
mą́ątah mą́k-omąkoʔsh
river lie-NARRATIVE.PAST
'The river was there.'

The English translations are not "A pot was sitting there," "A big village stood there," or "The river lay there." That reflects the fact that the postural categorization is required in such Mandan locative statements.

== Vocabulary ==
Mandan, like many other North American languages, has elements of sound symbolism in its vocabulary. A /s/ sound often denotes smallness/less intensity, /ʃ/ denotes medium-ness, /x/ denotes largeness/greater intensity:

- síire "yellow"
- shíire "tawny"
- xíire "brown"
- seró "tinkle"
- xeró "rattle"

Compare the similar examples in Lakhota.

== Sources ==
- Kasak, Ryan M. (2024). A Grammar of Mandan. Comprehensive Grammar Library. Vol. 10. Berlin: Language Science Press. doi:10.5281/zenodo.14227513. ISBN 978-3-96110-495-6. ISSN 2749-7798.
- Carter, Richard T. (1991a). "Old Man Coyote and the wild potato: A Mandan trickster tale". In Wolfart, H. C.; Finlay, J. L. (eds.). Linguistic studies presented to John L. Finlay. Memoir. Vol. 8. Winnipeg: Algonquian and Iroquoian Linguistics. pp. 27–43. ISBN 0-921064-08-X.
- Carter, Richard T. (1991b). "Maximilian's Ruptare vocabulary: Phililogical evidence and Mandan phonology". In Ingemann, F. (ed.). 1990 Mid-America Linguistics Conference: Papers. Lawrence, KS: Department of Linguistics, University of Kansas. pp. 479–489. hdl:1808/22940.
- Chafe, Wallace (1973). "Siouan, Iroquoian, and Caddoan". In Sebeok, T. A. (ed.). Current trends in linguistics. Vol. 10. The Hague: Mouton. pp. 1164–1209. (Republished as Chafe 1976a).
- Chafe, Wallace (1976a). "Siouan, Iroquoian, and Caddoan". In Sebeok, T. A. (ed.). Native languages of the Americas. New York: Plenum Press. pp. 527–572. ISBN 0-306-37157-X. (Originally published as Chafe 1973).
- Chafe, Wallace (1976b). The Caddoan, Iroquoian, and Siouan languages. Trends in linguistics: State-of-the-art report. Vol. 3. The Hague: Mouton. ISBN 90-279-3443-6.
- Coberly, Mary (1979). "A text analysis and brief grammatical sketch based on 'Trickster challenges the buffalo': A Mandan text collected by Edward Kennard". Colorado Research in Linguistics. 8: 19–94.
- Hollow, Robert C. (1970). A Mandan dictionary (PhD thesis). Berkeley: University of California.
- Hollow, Robert C.; Parks, Douglas (1980). "Studies in plains linguistics: A review". In Wood, W. R.; Liberty, M. P. (eds.). Anthropology on the Great Plains. Lincoln: University of Nebraska. pp. 68–97. ISBN 0-8032-4708-7.
- Kennard, Edward (1936). "Mandan grammar". International Journal of American Linguistics. 9 (1): 1–43. doi:10.1086/463817.
- Lowie, Robert H. (1913). "Societies of the Hidatsa and Mandan Indians". In Lowie, R. H. (ed.). Societies of the Crow, Hidatsa, and Mandan Indians. Anthropological Papers of the American Museum of Natural History. Vol. 11, Part 3. pp. 219–358. (Texts are on pp. 355–358).
- Mithun, Marianne (1999). The languages of Native North America. Cambridge: Cambridge University Press. ISBN 0-521-23228-7.
- Mixco, Mauricio C. (1997a). Mandan. Languages of the world series: Materials. Vol. 159. Münich: LINCOM Europa. ISBN 3-89586-213-4.
- Mixco, Mauricio C. (1997b). "Mandan switch reference: A preliminary view". Anthropological Linguistics. 39 (2): 220–298. JSTOR 30028466.
- Parks, Douglas R.; Jones, A. Wesley; Hollow, Robert C; Ripley, David J. (1978). Earth lodge tales from the upper Missouri. Bismarck, ND: Mary College.
- Parks, Douglas R.; Rankin, Robert L. (2001). "The Siouan languages". In DeMallie, R. J. (ed.). Handbook of North American Indians. Vol. 13: Plains. Washington, DC: Smithsonian Institution. pp. 94–114. ISBN 0-16-050400-7.
- Will, George; Spinden, H. J. (1906). "The Mandans: A study of their culture, archaeology and language". Papers of the Peabody Museum of American Archaeology and Ethnology, Harvard University. 3 (4): 81–219. (Reprinted 1976, New York: Kraus Reprint Corporation).
- Wolvengrey, Arok (1991). "A marker of focus in Mandan discourse". In Ingemann, F. (ed.). 1990 Mid-America Linguistics Conference: Papers. Lawrence, KS: Department of Linguistics, University of Kansas. pp. 584–598. hdl:1808/22949.
- Wood, Raymond W.; Irwin, Lee (2001). "Mandan". In DeMaille, Raymond J. (ed.). Handbook of North American Indians. Vol. 13: Plains. Washington, DC: Smithsonian Institution.
