= Fort Abraham Lincoln =

Park in North Dakota, US

Fort Abraham Lincoln State Park
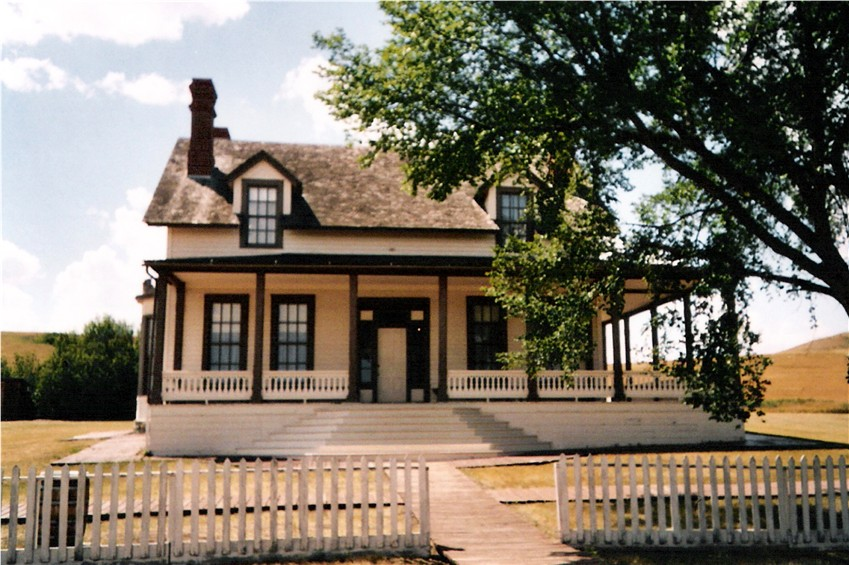
- Reproduction of Custer's House

- Location within North Dakota
- Location: Morton County, North Dakota, United States
- Nearest city: Bismarck, North Dakota
- Coordinates: 46°46′0.98″N 100°50′48″W
- Area: 836.47 acres (338.51 ha)
- Elevation: 1,700 ft (520 m)
- Established: 1907
- Administrator: North Dakota Parks and Recreation Department
- Designation: North Dakota state park
- Named for: President Abraham Lincoln
- Website: Official website

Fort Abraham Lincoln State Park is a North Dakota state park located 7 miles (11 km) south of Mandan, North Dakota, United States. The park is home to the replica Mandan On-A-Slant Indian Village and reconstructed military buildings including the Custer House.

== History ==
The Mandan Indian tribe established a village at the confluence of the Missouri and Heart Rivers in about 1575. They built earth lodges and thrived in their community by hunting bison and growing a number of crops. Two hundred years later, an outbreak of smallpox significantly decreased the Mandan population and the survivors resettled to the north. In June 1872, at the same location where the Mandan tribe had established their village, a military post named Fort McKeen was built by two companies of the 6th US Infantry under Lt. Col. Daniel Huston, Jr. (1824-1884) opposite Bismarck, Dakota Territory.

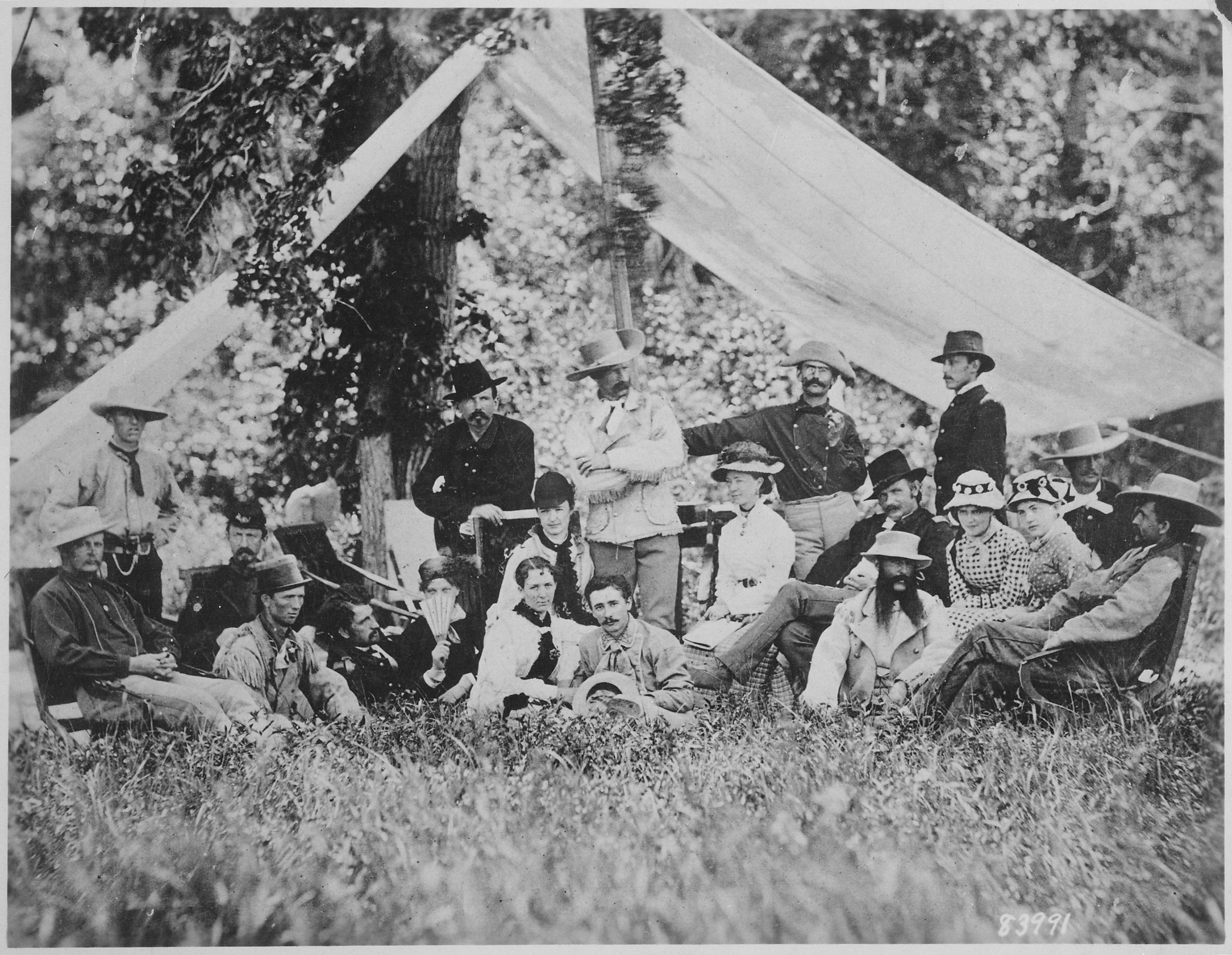
Hunting and camping party near Fort Abraham Lincoln (George Custer, center) 1875. (D. B. Berry) A good illustration of variety of uniforms worn by Cavalry Regiments in the west. (Note: Picture subjects are, from left to right: Lt. James Calhoun, Mr. Swett, Capt. Stephen Baker, Boston Custer, Lt. Winfield Scott Edgerly, Miss Watson, Capt. Myles Walter Keogh, Mrs. Maggie Calhoun, Mrs. Elizabeth Custer, Lt. Col. George Custer, Dr. H. O. Paulding, Mrs. Henrietta Smith, Dr. George Edwin Lord, Capt. Thomas Bell Weir, Lt. William Winer Cooke, Lt. R. E. Thompson, Miss Wadsworth, another Miss Wadsworth, Capt. Thomas Custer and Lt. Algernon Emery Smith. Identications thanks to Denver Public Library)

The three-company infantry post's name was changed to Fort Abraham Lincoln on November 19, 1872, and expanded to the south to include a cavalry post accommodating six companies. Among the 78 permanent wooden structures at Fort Lincoln were a post office, telegraph office, barracks for nine companies, seven officer's quarters, six cavalry stables, a guardhouse, granary, quartermaster storehouse, bakery, hospital, laundress quarters, and log scouts' quarters. Water was supplied to the fort by being hauled from the Missouri River in wagons, while wood was supplied by contract. By 1873, the 7th Cavalry moved into the fort to ensure the expansion of the Northern Pacific Railway. The first post commander of the expanded fort was Lieutenant Colonel George A. Custer, who held the position until his death in 1876.

In 1876, the Army departed from here as part of the Great Sioux War of 1876, resulting in Custer's defeat at the Little Bighorn, where they were to push the non-treaty Indians back to their particular reservations. Custer along with about half of his troops did not return to Fort Lincoln. The Fort was abandoned in 1891 after the completion of the railroad to Montana in 1883. A year after the fort was abandoned, local residents disassembled the fort for its nails and wood. In 1895, a new Fort Lincoln was built across the river near Bismarck. In 1907, President Theodore Roosevelt signed the deed to the original fort's land over to the state as Fort Abraham Lincoln State Park.

In 1934, the Civilian Conservation Corps built a visitor center, shelters, and roads. They also reconstructed military blockhouses and placed cornerstones to mark where fort buildings once stood, as well as replicating Mandan earthen lodges. Additional reproductions have since been built on the site, creating a replica Mandan village, called "On-a-Slant Village." A reproduction of Custer's house was built in the park in 1989, in time for the state of North Dakota's centennial celebration.

== Features ==
=== On-A-Slant Indian Village ===
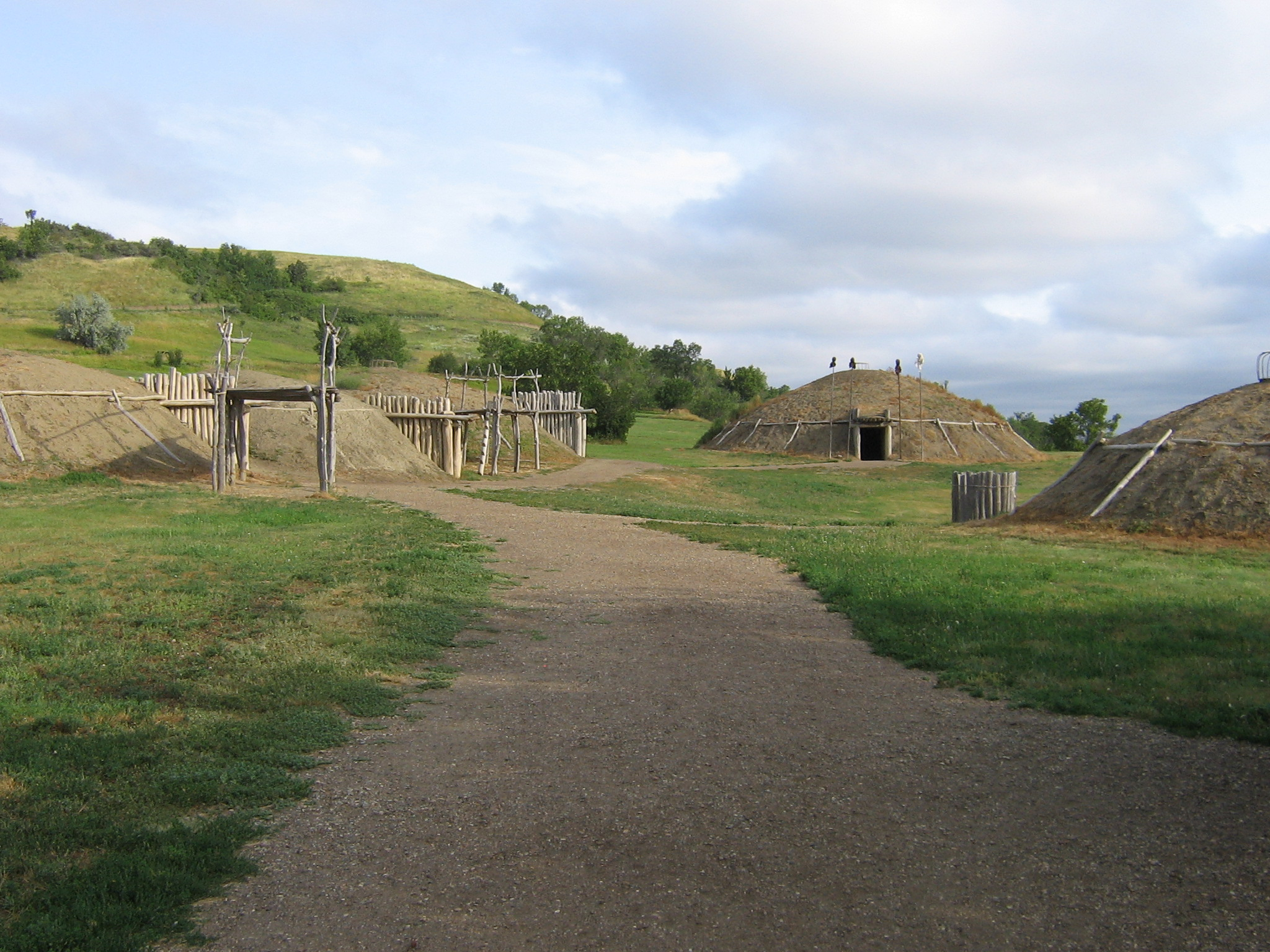
Partial reconstruction of On-a-Slant Village

On-A-Slant, Mandan Village (Mandan: Miti-ba-wa-esh) was established in the late 16th century and was inhabited until c. 1781. During those years the Mandan tribe had between seven and nine villages (all located along the Missouri River), with an estimated total population of 10,000 to 15,000. On-a-Slant was the furthest south of all these villages and consisted of approximately 86 earth lodges. Its population was about 1,000–1,500. It was located near the point where the Missouri and Heart Rivers come together and was named so by the Mandan because the village was built on ground that slopes towards the river valley. It was fortified with a ditch and palisade, to protect its wealth of food and trade goods.

The women of the Mandan tribe were responsible for building the earth lodges, which were held up by a frame of cottonwood logs and covered with layers of willow branches, grass, and earth. These thick walls insulated the lodge effectively in both summer and winter. The top center of the earth lodge contained a hole to let out smoke from the fire pit and to let in sunlight. The earth lodges were placed close together with all entrances facing towards the village plaza in the center. Each lodge housed about ten to fifteen members of the immediate and extended family. The Mandan tribe lived on farming and hunting. The village became a center of trading because the Mandan were known for their ability to make pottery and prepare animal skins. In 1781, a smallpox epidemic ravaged the Mandan tribe, killing off a majority of the villagers. The remaining tribe members moved north to join the Hidatsa tribe along the Knife River.

=== Historic Fort Lincoln and the Custer House ===
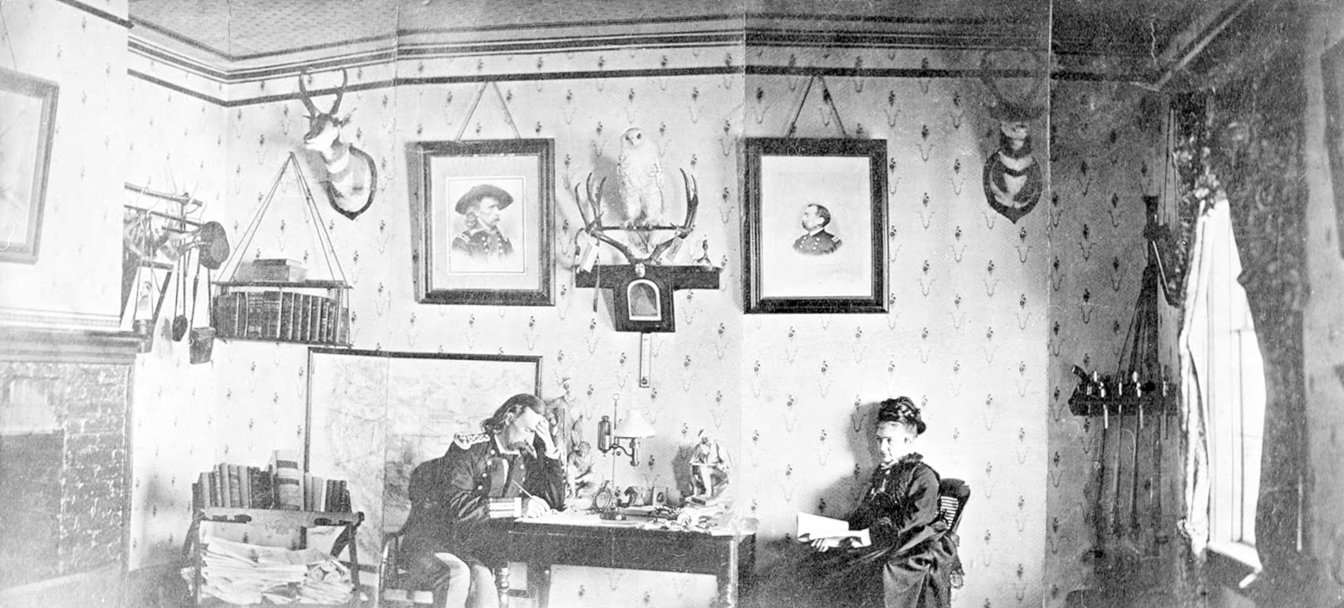
Custer and his wife at Fort Abraham Lincoln, Dakota Territory, April 6, 1874. Reportedly at right in gunrack is a Webley RIC used by Custer

Lieutenant Colonel George Armstrong Custer and his wife, Libbie, lived at Fort Abraham Lincoln from 1873 until Custer died at the Battle of the Little Bighorn in the summer of 1876. Approximately 500 troops were also stationed there. Custer's first home at the fort was built in the summer of 1873, but it burned down in February 1874. Today, the house and seven other major fort buildings, including a barracks, the fort's makeshift theater, a stable building, and several blockhouses, have been rebuilt.

=== Five Nations Art Gallery ===
Five Nations Art Gallery is part of the Fort Abraham Lincoln Foundation, which is a non-profit organization that is dedicated to maintaining and promoting the heritage and historic perspectives of Fort Lincoln and other historic sites in North Dakota. Five Nations Arts is a local art store specializing in regional Native American art, showcasing the five Indian nations of the Northern Plains. They offer paintings, jewelry, sculptures, dream catchers and beadwork created by 200 local artists. Painted buffalo skins and local sewn quilts are offered. Music from national and local musicians is also available along with locally produced soaps made from buffalo tallow and natural local herbs, such as cedar, rose, sage, and sweet grass.

Five Nations Arts is established in the former Northern Pacific Railway station, on Main Street in Mandan. "Five Nations" refers to the five federally recognized tribes in North Dakota: the Anishinaabe (a.k.a. Chippewa and Métis of Turtle Mountain) Mandan, Hidatsa, and Arikara Nation (a.k.a. the Three Affiliated Tribes), and the Lakota (Spirit Lake, Standing Rock and Lake Traverse Indian Reservations), or the five reservations in North Dakota: Fort Berthold Indian Reservation (Three Affiliated Tribes), Spirit Lake Indian Reservation (Lakota), Standing Rock Sioux Reservation (Lakota), Lake Traverse Indian Reservation (Lakota), and Turtle Mountain Indian Reservation (Anishinaabe and Métis).

== Activities and amenities ==
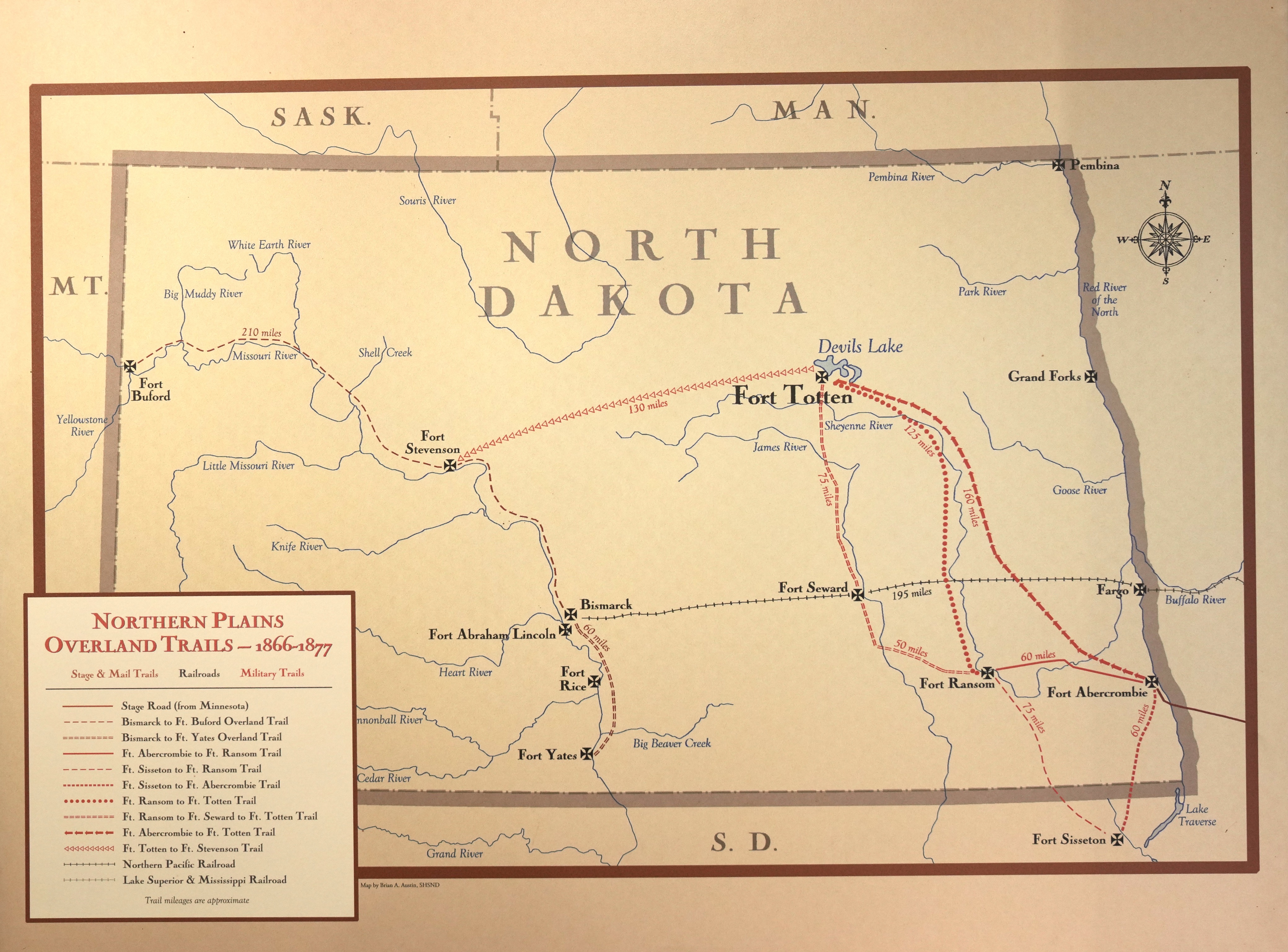
Northern Plains Overland Trails 1866-1877 map on display at the Fort Totten Historic Site

Fort Lincoln Park offers living history tours of the Custer House every half-hour. The tour is roughly thirty minutes long and takes you back to the year 1875 when Custer and his wife were living at Fort Abraham Lincoln. The guides are dressed either as laundresses or soldiers from 1875. Interpretive tours of On-A-Slant Village and the earth lodges, in which the guides give a basic introduction to Mandan culture, are offered every half-hour and are about thirty minutes long. Along with the tours, there is a historical museum comprising On-A-Slant Village, Fort Abraham Lincoln, and Fort Lincoln State Park culture and history. A gift shop and coffee shop have been built in the re-constructed commissary storehouse. During the summers, melodramas, including ones originally performed at Fort Lincoln in the 1870s, are performed by the guides in the re-built granary. The park has 95 campsites, two sleeping cabins, and picnic shelters. Horseback tours, hiking, fishing, and playgrounds are also available.

== Notable residents ==
- Sheheke, Mandan tribal chief who accompanied Lewis and Clark with his family back to Washington D.C. in 1806 after the Lewis and Clark Expedition, was born here around 1766.
- Mato-tope, Mandan tribal chief who was painted by artists George Catlin and Karl Bodmer, grew up here.
- Frank L. Anders, Medal of Honor recipient and notable businessman, was born here November 10, 1875.
