= Mato-tope =

Native American; Chief of the Mandan tribe

Four Bears
- Mató-Tóope
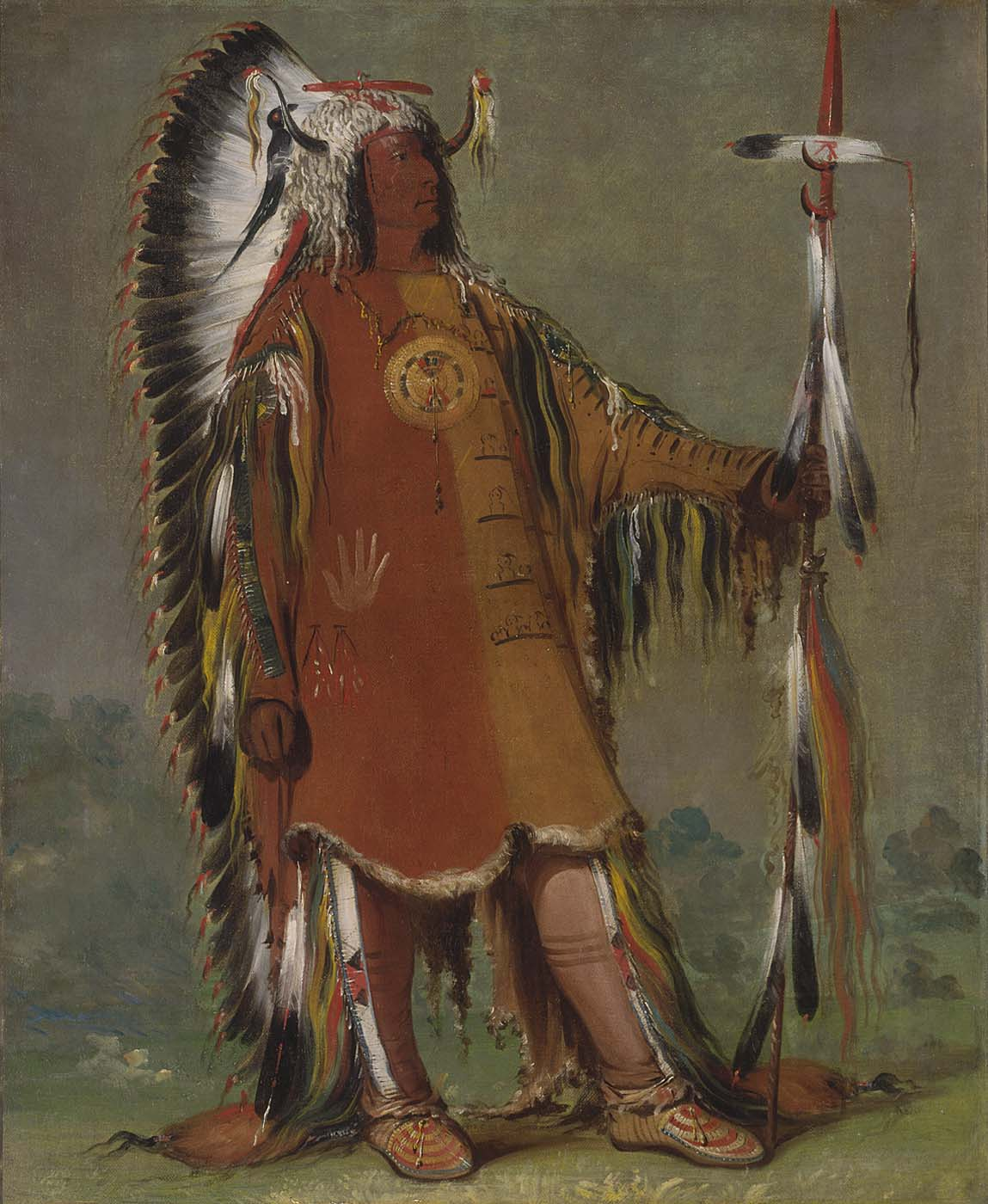
- Máh-to-tóh-pa by George Catlin

Mandan leader

Personal details
- Born: c. 1784
- Died: July 30, 1837
- Mother tongue: Mandan

Mato-tope (modern Mandan orthography Mató-Tóope, “Four Bears”, from mató 'bear' and tóope 'four', also known as Ma-to-toh-pe, Máh-to-tóh-pa; c. 1784 – July 30, 1837) was the second chief of the Mandan tribe to be known as "Four Bears," a name he earned after charging the Assiniboine tribe during battle with the strength of four bears. Four Bears lived in the first half of the 19th century on the upper Missouri River in what is now North Dakota. Four Bears was a favorite subject of artists, painted by George Catlin and Karl Bodmer.

== Early years ==
Four Bears grew up in an earth lodge in the Mandan village On-a-Slant Village. His father, Good Boy (or Handsome Child), was the village chief. Later the family lived in Mitutanka further north, founded about 1822, possibly by Good Boy.

== The warrior ==
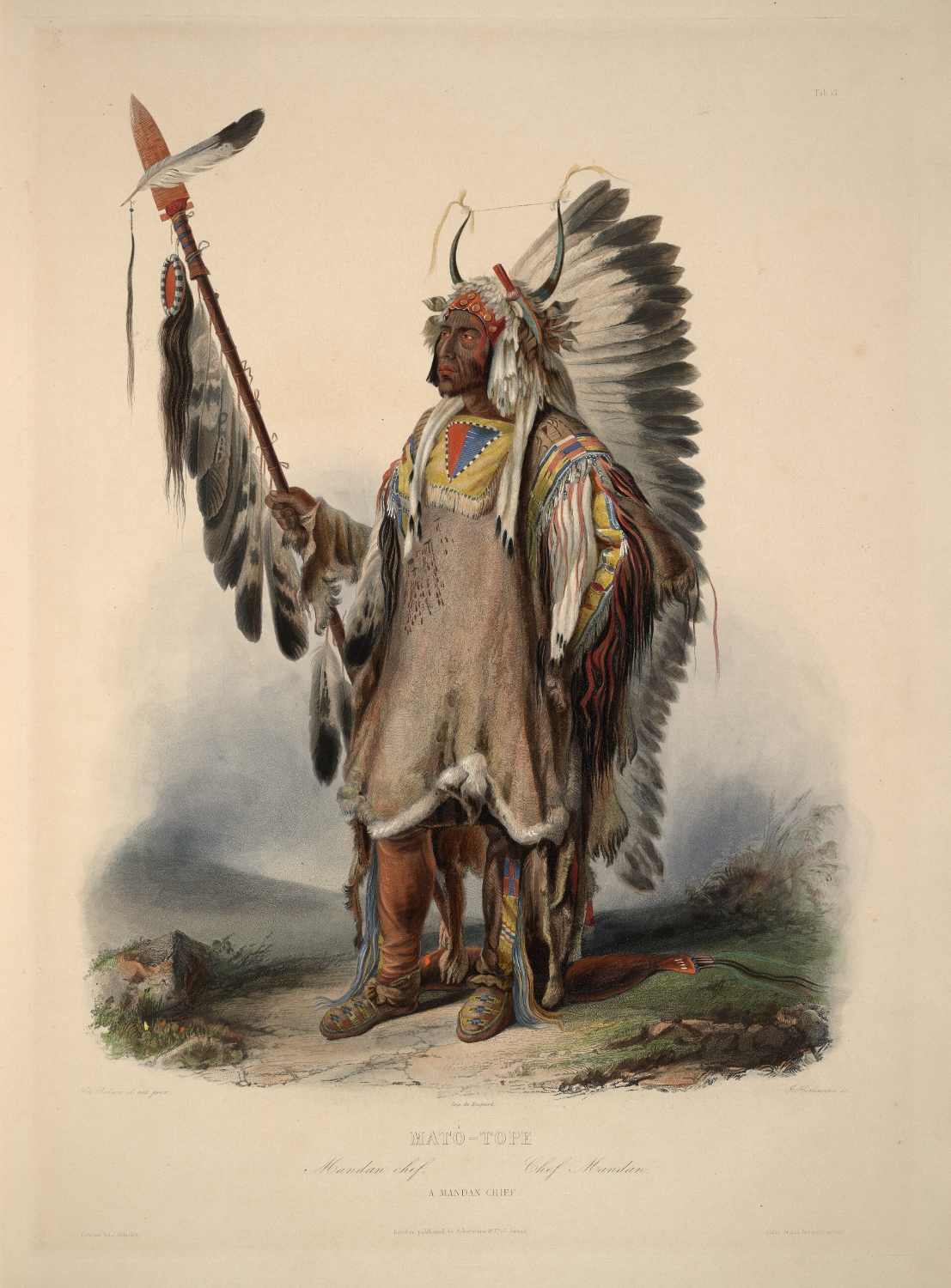
Mato-tope holding a lance and wearing painted and quilled shirt: aquatint by Karl Bodmer from the book "Maximilian, Prince of Wied’s Travels in the Interior of North America, during the years 1832–1834". The shirt is made of "bighorn leather".

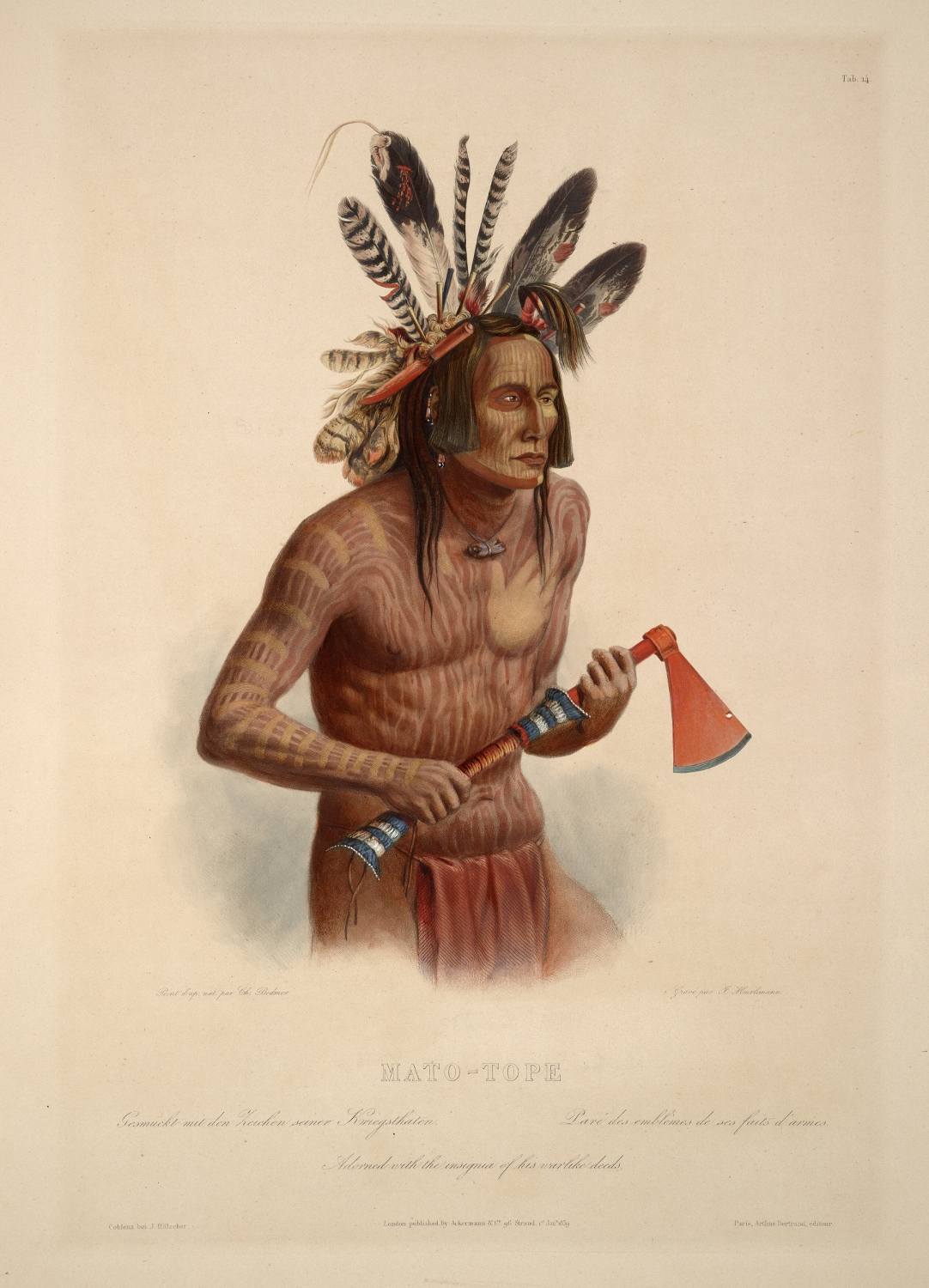
Mato-Tope, Adorned with the insignia of his warlike deeds.: aquatint by Karl Bodmer from the book "Maximilian, Prince of Wied’s Travels in the Interior of North America, during the years 1832–1834". The six sticks in his hair represent killing six men with a gun and the wooden knife represents he killed a Cheyenne chief with a knife. The split turkey feather is said to stand for an arrow wound. The hand on Four Bears' torso may indicate that he once seized an enemy for his comrades to kill.

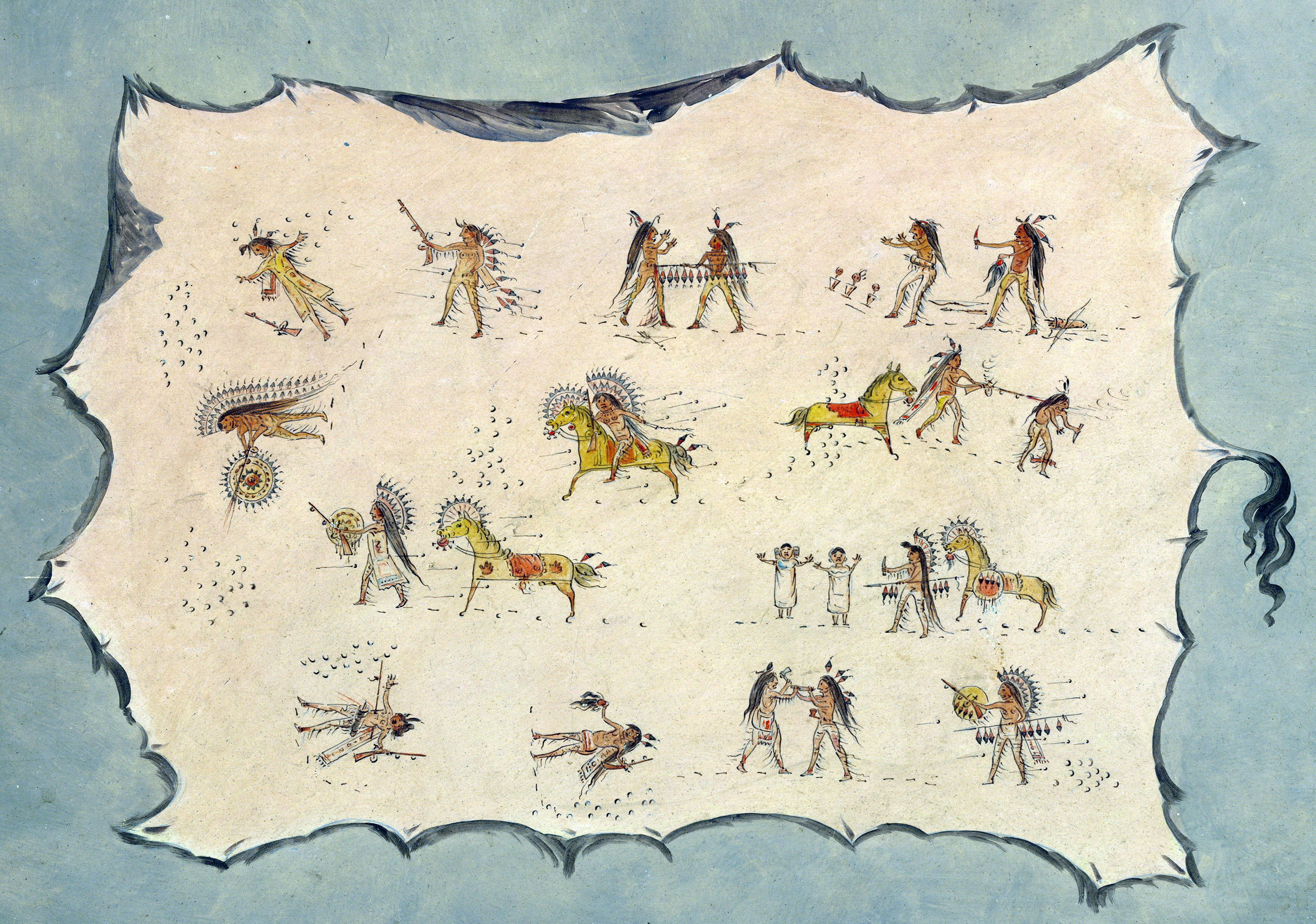
Facsimile of the Robe of Mah-to-toh-pa - Mandan by George Catlin showing Mato-Tope victories

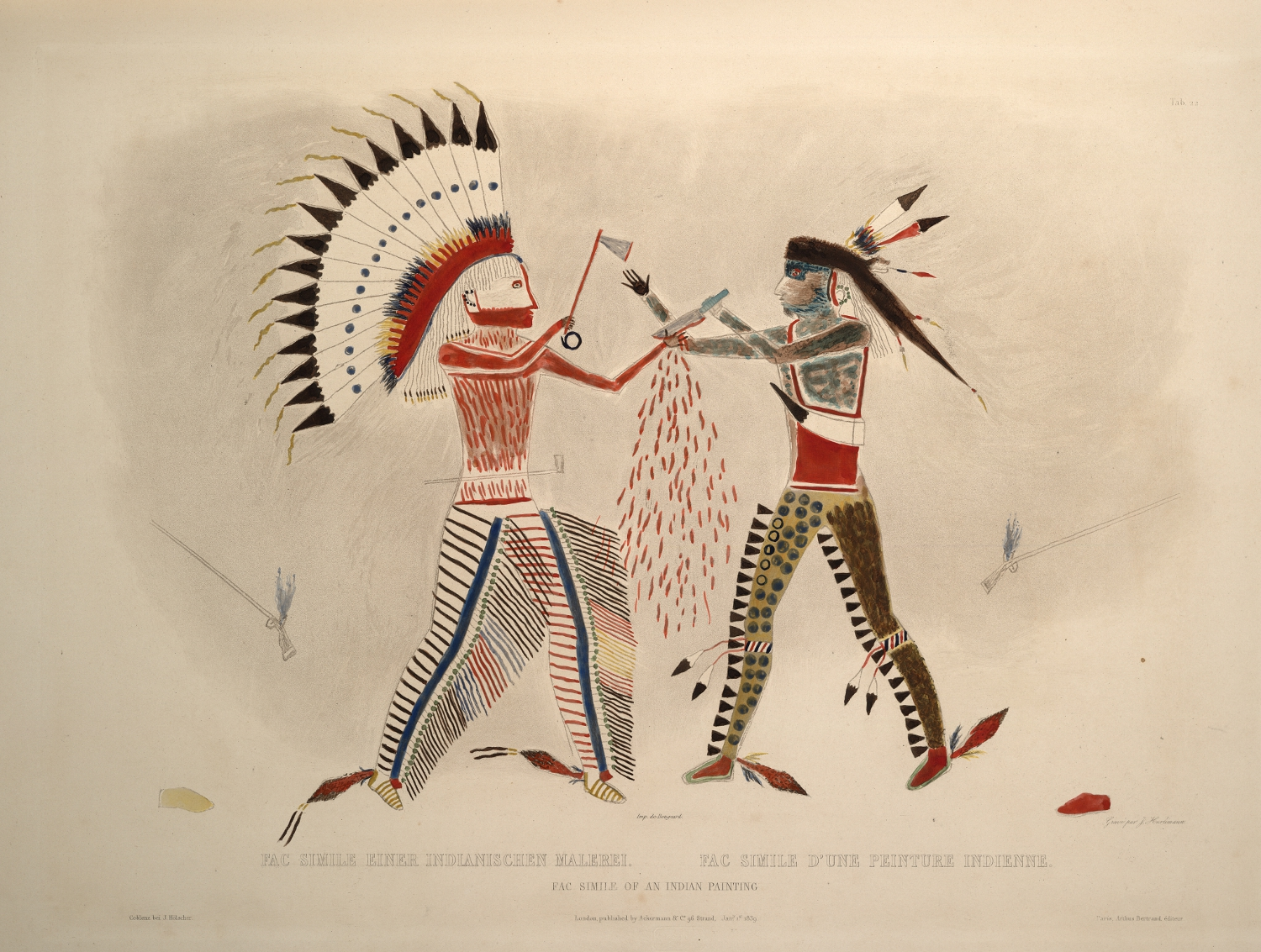
Karl Bodmer facsimile of ledger art showing Four Bears (at left) in a duel with a Cheyenne chief. The hand wound of the knife entitled him to pose with a wooden knife, as seen on the pictures of Catlin and Bodmer. The realistic work of both artists inspired Four Bears to make this true-to-life drawing of his feat.

Around 1830 the trading post Fort Clark was built less than 600 ft. (150 m) south of Mitutanka. At that time, Four Bears was a brave warrior among his people, famous for killing a Cheyenne chief in hand-to-hand combat. Besides the Cheyenne, Four Bears fought the Sioux, the Arikara, and the Assiniboine and once he killed two Ojibwe women. The daring revenge upon the actual killer of his younger brother was still a topic among the Mandans in the early 1930s. Four Bears had learned the identity of the Arikara warrior, Bear Necklace, through fast and "self-torture" under an oak tree with a raven nest.

Catlin secured a robe recounting Four Bears' deeds in 1832, now preserved in the United States National Museum. Another robe of Four Bears collected by Catlin is on display at the Upper Musselshell Museum in Harlowton, Montana.

The next to bring home a robe of Four Bears showing warrior exploits was Prince Maximilian zu Wied. This robe is in Linden Museum, Stuttgart, Germany. While other leading men were sturdy and tall, Maximilian described the ever-successful warrior Four Bears as a bit slim and only of average height. Four Bears' good fortune on the warpath came in part from a sacred bundle containing a rainbow-decorated robe.

== The public figure ==
Four Bears had an important "People Above bundle", one of five among the Mandans. Twice he sponsored the most fundamental ceremony of his tribe, the Okipa. Belonging to the elite of Mitutanka, he lived in an earth lodge across from the ceremonial lodge, with its doorway out to the plaza.

Four Bears was often painted by artist George Catlin; Catlin held Four Bears in very high regard, saying that he was a man of liberty, generosity and elegance. Catlin stated that he was one of the most extraordinary Indians he had ever known.

== Family ==
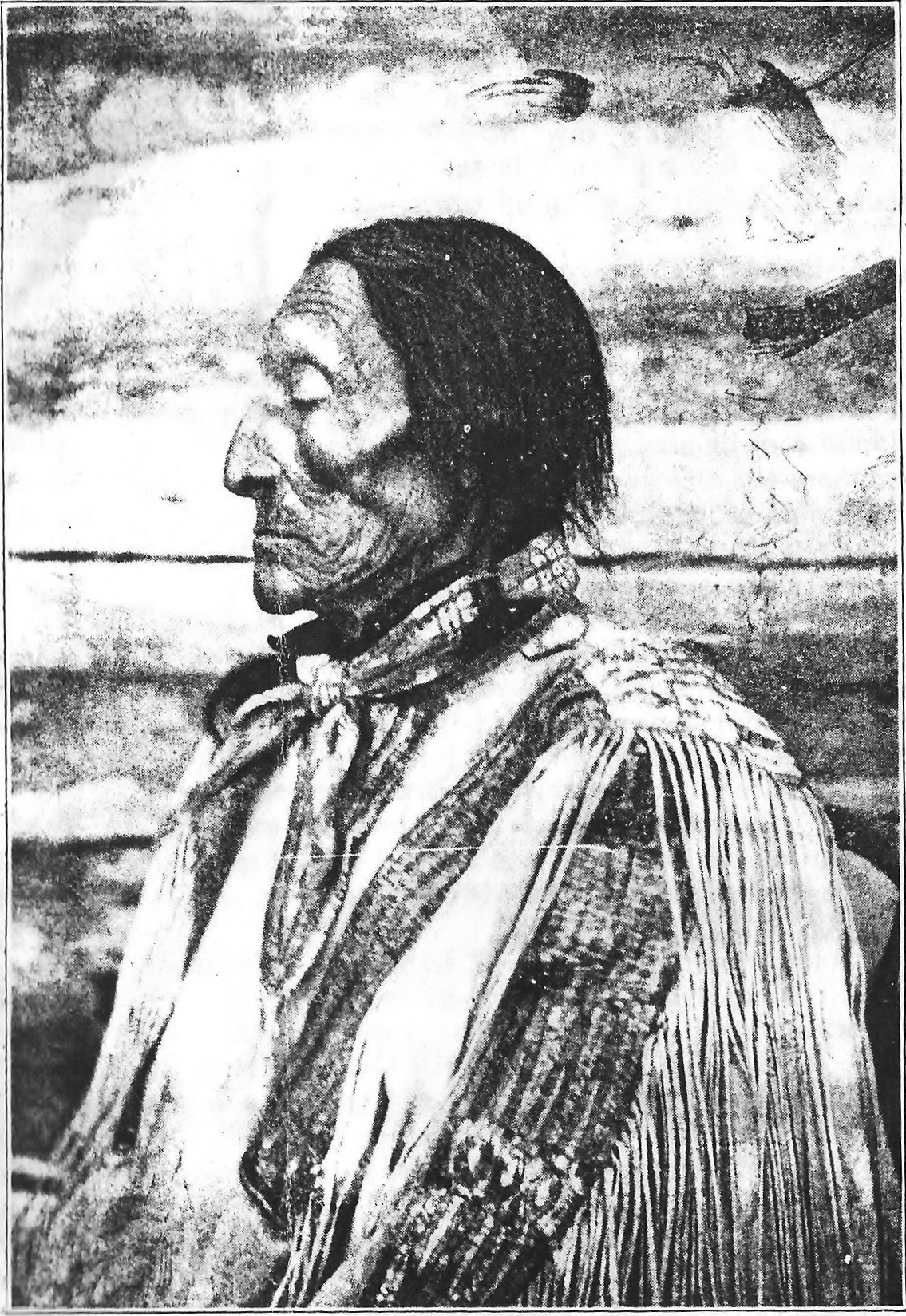
Mandan Chief Bad Gun, son of Mandan Chief Four Bears

Four Bears' wife was Brown Woman. The couple had an unclear number of children. A daughter is known as Earth Woman. When Maximilian, accompanied by Karl Bodmer, arrived at Fort Clark on November 13, 1833, Four Bears greeted them together "with his wife and a pretty little boy", The Male Bear. This could be an early name for a boy born in 1829, later in life known as Bad Gun, or it may be a brother of his.

Bad Gun (or Rushing After The Eagle) lived on after the 1837 scourge. Eventually he became a chief in the common Mandan, Hidatsa, and Arikara settlement Like a Fishhook Village, largely because of his outstanding father.

== Visiting the guests from Europe ==
Four Bears became friends with artist Karl Bodmer in 1833. He spent time teaching Maximilian his own language and the very different Arikara tongue, which he spoke fluently. He became chief in the year 1836.

== The death of Four Bears ==
The 1837 Great Plains smallpox epidemic wiped out most of Four Bears' tribe, leaving 27 (or by some accounts 100 to 150) survivors out of a former population of around 2,000. He died on July 30, 1837, after suffering from smallpox, brought to his tribe by whites. "One of our best friend of the Village (The Four Bears) died to day, regretted by all who Knew him", wrote the manager of Fort Clark, Francis A. Chardon. Before his own death, he lost his wife and maybe some children to the disease. (However, during his study of the Hidatsa in the 1930s, Alfred W. Bowers learned that the Hidatsa Guts married the widow of Four Bears and looked after his son.) As recorded in Four Bears' last speech to the Arikara and Hidatsa (two neighboring tribes) he denounced the white man, whom he had previously treated as a brother, for deliberately bringing the disease to his people. He lamented that in death his scarred face would be so ugly even the wolves would turn away from him. His exhortation to wage war on the whites was found with the journal of Chardon. If the speech accurately "... represents his [Four Bears'] words is hard to say. Chardon ... could not have been present to hear it ...". Many believed that he died of smallpox, but George Catlin claimed that he starved himself to death out of grief from the death of his family.

Smallpox wiped out more than 80 percent of the Mandan population in only a few months, and they were not the only tribe to suffer from the disease.

A descendant is Edward Lone Fight Chairman of the Mandan, Hidatsa and Arikara Nation (Three Affiliated Tribes) from 1986 to 1990

== Honoring Four Bears ==
Along with a Hidatsa chief of the same name, Four Bears is honored with Four Bears Bridge and Four Bears' Casino and Lodge.

A mountain in Glacier National Park is named after the chief, though spelled differently as Mahtotopa Mountain.
