= Mahtotopa Mountain =

Mountain in Montana, United States

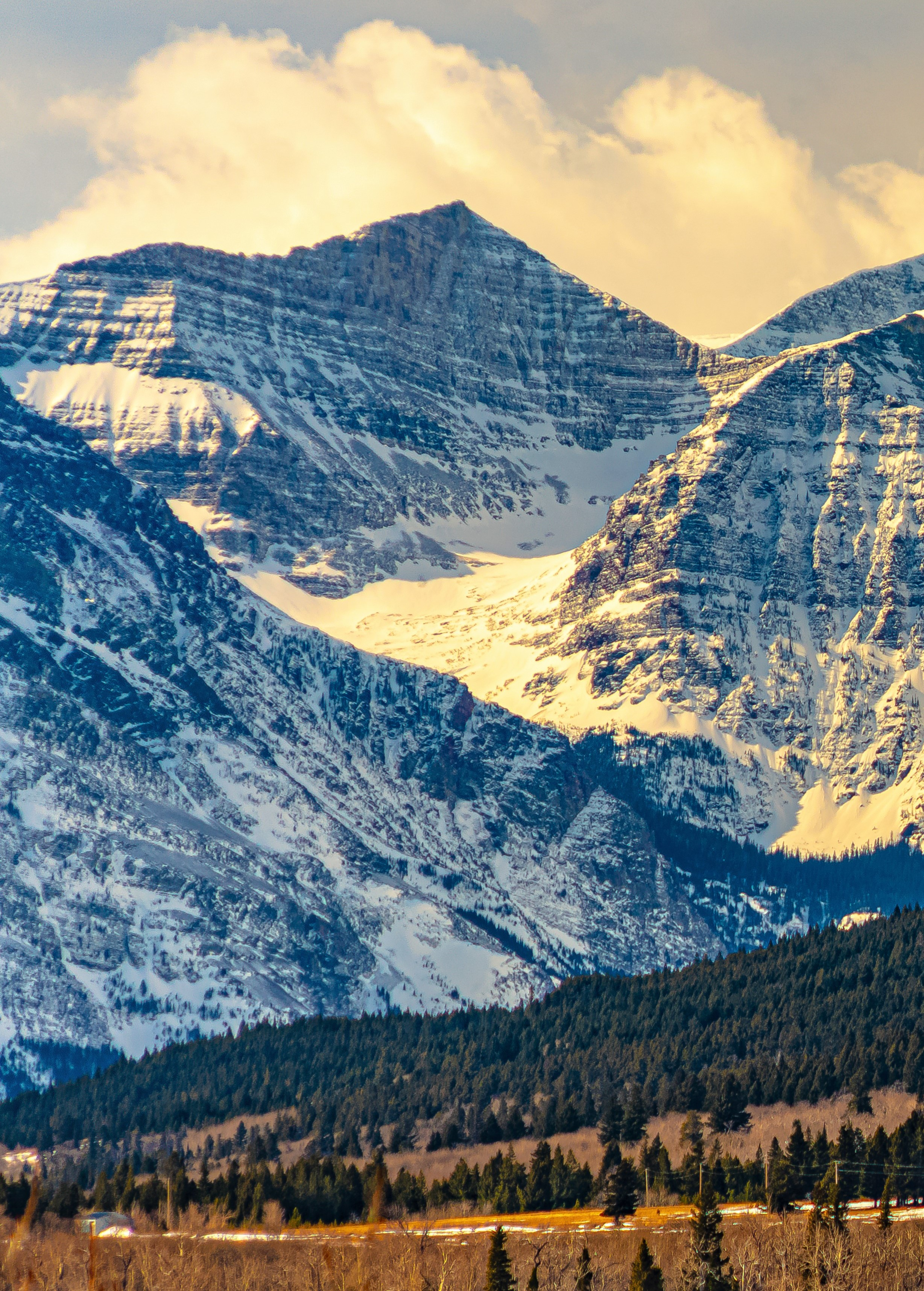
- Mahtotopa Mountain, northeast aspect

Highest point
- Elevation: 8,677 ft (2,645 m)
- Prominence: 417 ft (127 m)
- Coordinates: 48°39′06″N 113°34′09″W

Geography
- Location within Montana Location within the United States
- Location: Glacier County, Montana, U.S.
- Parent range: Lewis Range
- Topo map(s): USGS Rising Sun, MT

Mahtotopa Mountain (8,677 feet (2,645 m)) is located in the Lewis Range, Glacier National Park in the U.S. state of Montana. Mahtotopa Mountain rises to the south above Saint Mary Lake midway between Red Eagle Mountain and Little Chief Mountain and can be easily seen from the Going-to-the-Sun Road to the southwest of Rising Sun. Originally named Four Bears Mountain by George Bird Grinnell in 1885, the name was changed in 1932 to Mahtotopa. Mahtotopa is an incorrect spelling of "Mato-tope" which comes from Lakota, Mato Topa, the Mandan chief known as Four Bears. Mato-tope was a grandfather of Joe Kipp, a hunting companion of Grinnell.

== Climate ==
Based on the Köppen climate classification, Mahtotopa Mountain is located in a subarctic climate zone characterized by long, usually very cold winters, and short, cool to mild summers. Winter temperatures can drop below −10 °F with wind chill factors below −30 °F.

== Geology ==
Like other mountains in Glacier National Park, Mahtotopa Mountain is composed of sedimentary rock laid down during the Precambrian to Jurassic periods. Formed in shallow seas, this sedimentary rock was initially uplifted beginning 170 million years ago when the Lewis Overthrust fault pushed an enormous slab of precambrian rocks 3 mi (4.8 km) thick, 50 miles (80 km) wide and 160 miles (260 km) long over younger rock of the cretaceous period.

== Gallery ==
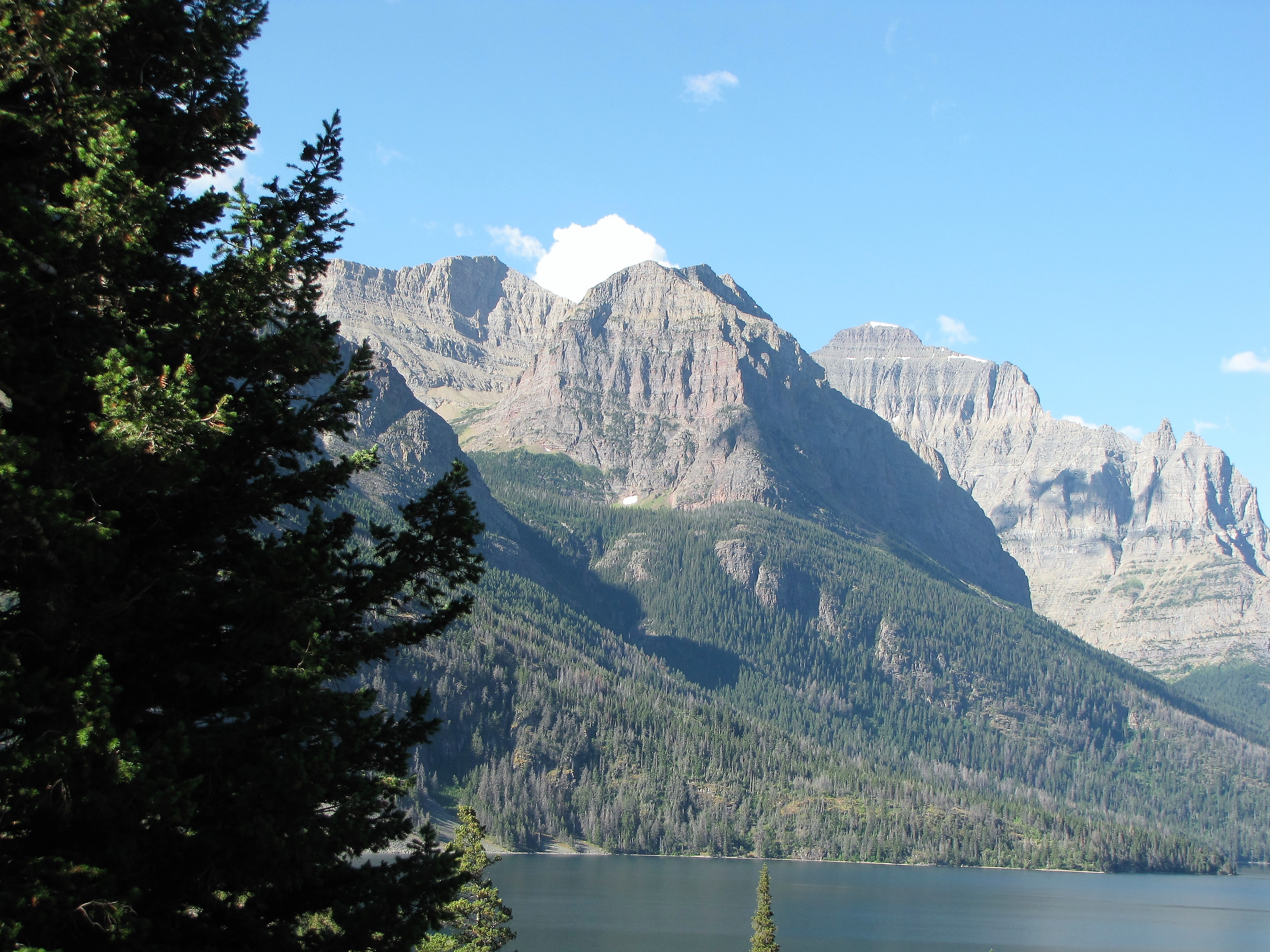
Mahtotopa Mountain (left) with Little Chief Mountain in background

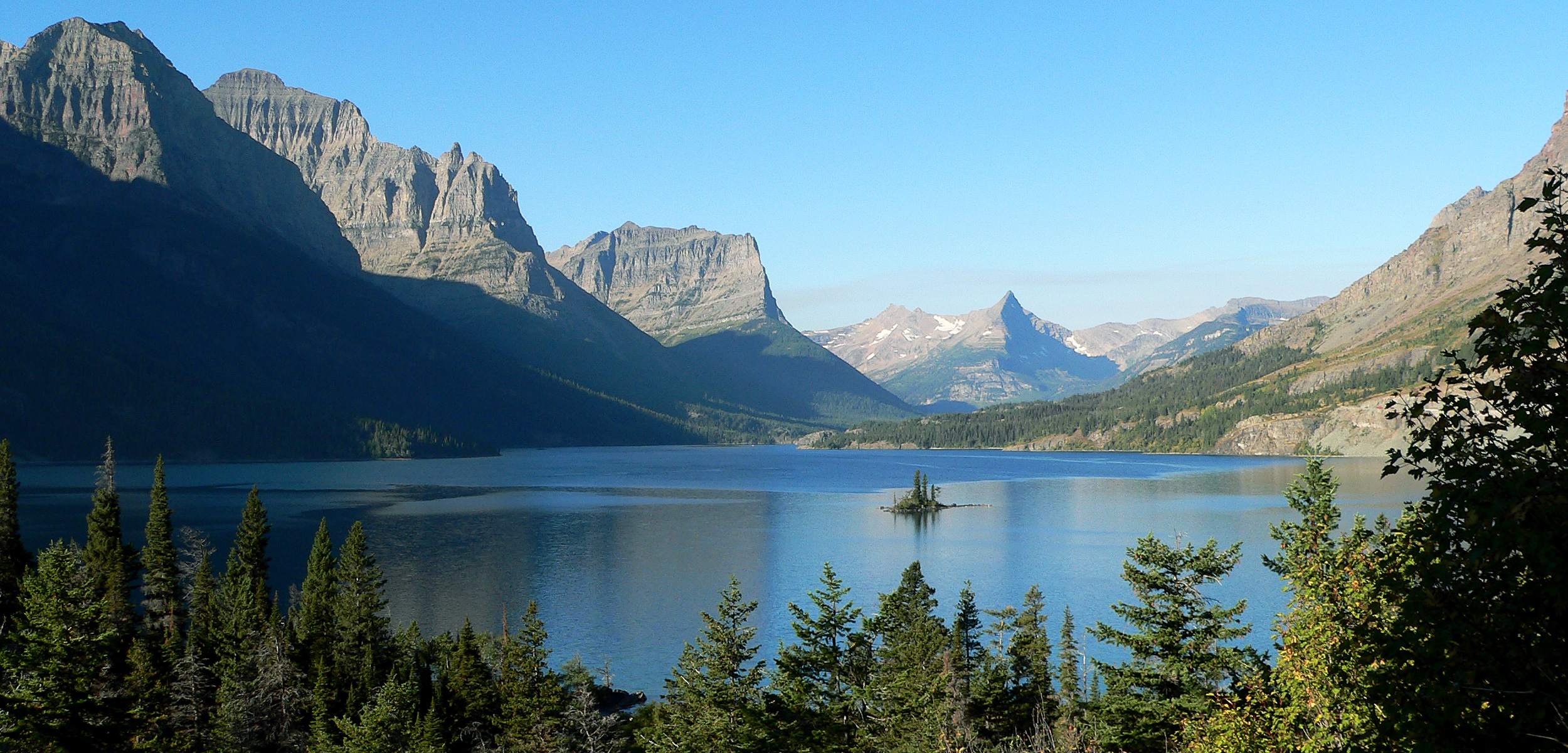
Saint Mary Lake with part of Mahtotpa Mountain at far left

== See also ==
- List of mountains and mountain ranges of Glacier National Park (U.S.)
