= North American Native Museum =

Coordinates: 47.3471°N 8.5656°E

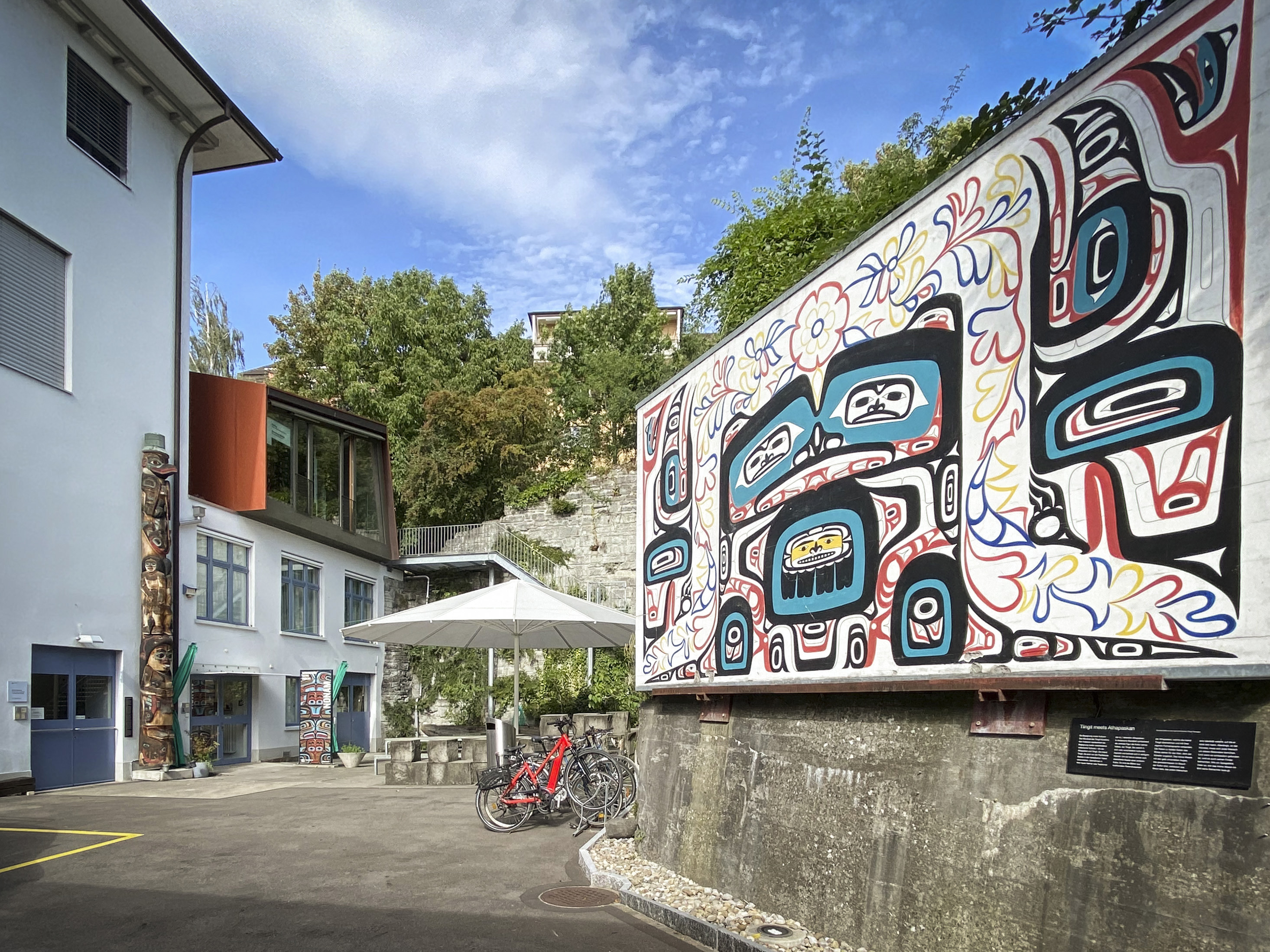
Entrance of the North American Native Museum in Zurich

The North American Native Museum, or Nordamerika Native Museum (NONAM), is a museum run by the City of Zurich, Switzerland. The museum specializes in the conservation, documentation, and presentation of ethnographic objects and artwork of Native American, First Nation, and Inuit cultures.

== History ==
=== Gottfried Hotz and the "Indianermuseum" ===
The foundations for the North American Native Museum Zurich were laid in 1961, when the city of Zurich bought the formerly private collection of Gottfried Hotz. Two years later the Hotz collection was moved to a school building in Zurich's Aussersihl district, where it was displayed to the public as Indianermuseum der Stadt Zürich.Hotz remained in charge of his collection as Director of the museum until in 1977 Hans Läng succeeded him and assumed office as curator of the Indianermuseum. Läng expanded the collection in similar ways as Hotz did until his retirement in 1993. That year proved to be a turning point in the history of the museum, as the new director / curator Denise Daenzer ventured into a re-orientation of the museum's work, presenting varying exhibitions of the collection's objects and special exhibitions addressing specific topics.

=== The Nordamerika Native Museum ===
As the museum was increasingly collaborating with Native Americans, Inuit, and First Nations, a change of the museum's name seemed to be appropriate. In early 2003, the museum opened its gates in its current location in the Seefeld district, as the Nordamerika Native Museum (NONAM). The larger premise proved to be useful in promoting more temporary exhibitions. The development of a new wing in the second floor of the building, called pavilion, further helped the cause of the museum. It enables cultural programms, workshops and is used as a space for cultural mediation.

On the occasion of its 50th year of existence, the museum continued its path towards a more modern collection. With the help of the swiss "Lotteriefonds" in 2011 the NONAM acquired more than fifty pieces of contemporary indigenous art. With this Denise Daenzer guided the collection towards a new direction. It underpinned the museums determination to highlight indigenous perspectives, critical dialogues and historical revision. Denise Daenzer continued to direct the museum, expanding the collections and curating most of the museum's temporary exhibitions until her retirement in 2012. She was succeeded by Heidrun Löb, the current director, who continues the notion of changing the public perspective on Native Americans. Nowadays contemporary indigenous art and crafts are core elements of both the collection and the exhibitions. Furthermore the museum is frequently hosting indigenous artists for speeches, performances, workshops and cultural exchange.

== Exhibitions ==
=== Permanent exhibitions ===
==== Main exhibition ====
A part of the museum's collections is on permanent display in the second floor, organized according to the culture areas of the Americas frequently used in the cultural anthropology of North America.

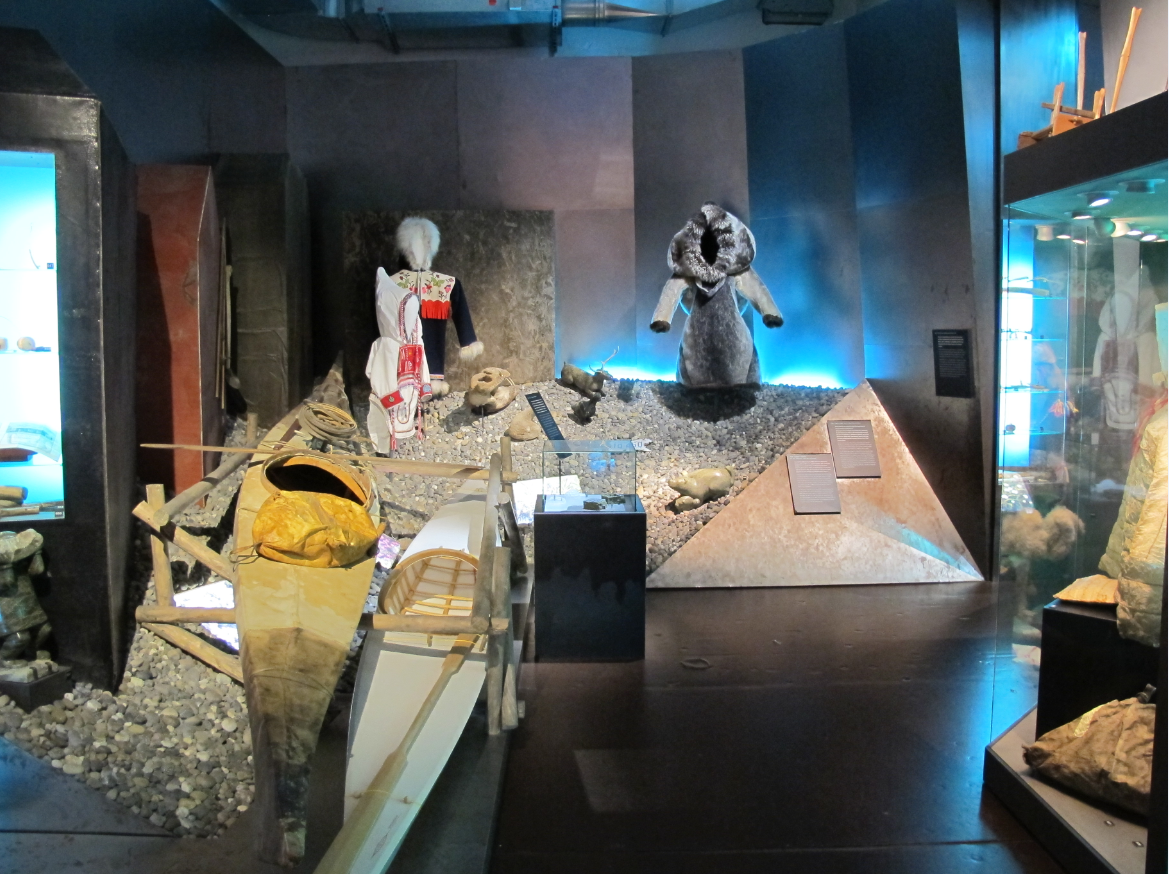
Part of arctic exhibition at the NONAM Nordamerika Native Museum Zurich

==== Bodmer Gallery ====
In 2013 the museum added a small gallery, showing selected original works of Karl Bodmer.

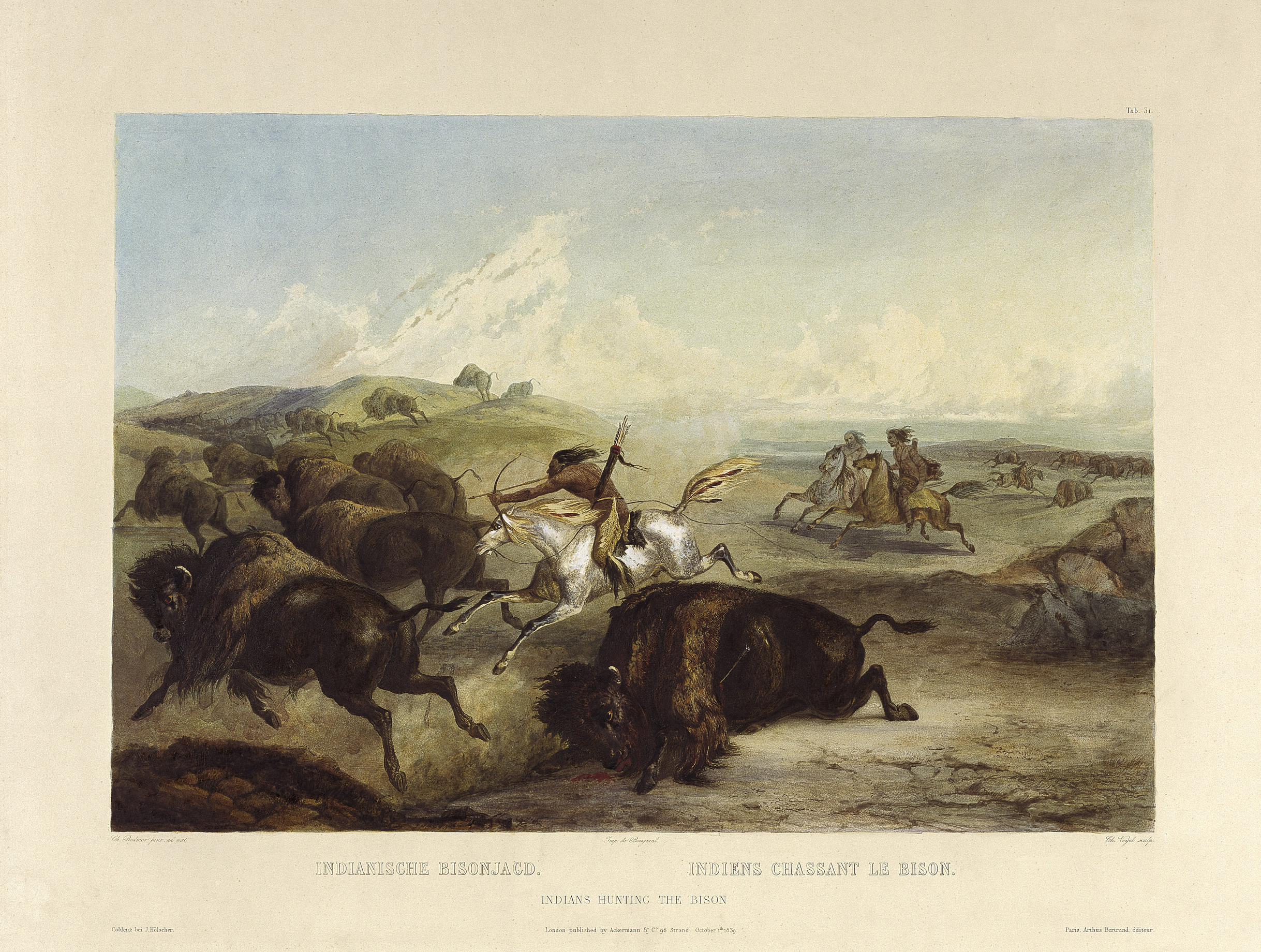
Indians hunting bison by Karl Bodmer

==== Soundscape ====
In the museum's "soundscape" installation, visitors can explore the world of the Inuit, Kwakwaka'wakw (Kwakiutl), Hopi and Diné (Navajo) with their ears only. The "sounding museum" has been accredited by the UNESCO committee as a contribution to the International Year for the Rapprochement of Cultures, 2010.

=== Special exhibitions ===
Some of the special exhibitions the NONAM showed since the museum's relocation in 2003 are the following:

- At the Ice Edge – Revisiting North Greenland 14.12.2025 – 06.28.20256
- Honouring Our Future – Yukon First Nations Graduation Regalia 04.05.2025 – 09.28.2025
- Move – Indigenous Nations in Motion 05.03.2024 – 08.17.2025
- Katsinam – Cloud People and Ancestral Spirits 04.22.2018 – 03.03.2019
- Leo Yerxa – Tales from the Woodlands 10.05.2017 – 02.25.2018
- Bison, Büffel, Buffalo – Decline, Crisis and Comeback of the American Bison 12.20.2016 – 09.03.2017
- Calling the Animals – Arctic stories, drawn, printed and carved in stone 03.17.2016 – 07.03.2016
- Vanishing Thule – A Culture on thin Ice 10.01.2015 – 02.28.2016
- Native Art Now – Contemporary Indigenous Art 11.08.2014 – 06.07.2015
- Land, Art, Horizons – Land Reflected in Contemporary Native American Art 04.10.2014 – 09.07.2014
- Learning to Survive – Education in Native American, First Nation and Inuit cultures 05.08.2013 – 02.28.2014
- Fascinating «Indians» – European Imagination of Native Americans through the Centuries 03.22.2012 – 10.31.2012
- From Cod – Liver Oil to Totem Animal – Animals in the Native Cultures of North America 02.10.2011 – 12.31.2011
- Mantu'c – The Language of Glass Beads 04.15.2010 – 11.14.2010
- Karl Bodmer – A Swiss Artist in North America 02.08.2009 – 08.09.2009
- Aiguuq! – Arctic treasures from Swiss Museums 03.08.2008 – 08.17.2008
- Life at the Edge of the World – Photographs of Northern Greenland by Markus Bühler–Rasom 11.01.2007 – 02.24.2008
- Richly Adorned – Native American Jewelry from Arizona and New Mexico 06.17.2007 – 10.15.2007
- Canoe Kayak – Native American and Inuit Boats 09.17.2006 – 05.31.2007
- Swiss Pioneers – in the Land of the Lakota and Crow 05.18.2006 – 09.03.2006
- Traditions of Change – Contemporary Art of the Athabaskan and Tlingit 09.17.2005 – 04.30.2006
- Cherokee People Today – Photographs by David G. Fitzgerald 02.03.2005 – 08.31.2005
- Living Environments – Environments of Art Contemporary Iroquois Art 06.05.2004 – 12.31.2004
- Katsinam – Ceremonial Figures of the Pueblo Cultures 09.21.2003 – 04.30.2004
- Inuit Art – Art for Survival 01.26.2003 – 08.20.2003

== Publications ==
Publications of the NONAM are usually in German language.

- Vanishing Thule – Eine Kultur auf dünnem Eis. NONAM, Zurich 2015. German.
- Native Art Now – Zeitgenössische indigene Kunst. NONAM, Zurich 2014. German.
- Faszination Indianer – Vorstellungen, Darstellungen – ein Streifzug durch die Jahrhunderte. NONAM, Zurich 2012. German. An accompanying English booklet is available upon request.
- Mantu'c – little spirits: Die Sprache der Glasperlen. NONAM, Zürich 2010. German.
- Karl Bodmer: A Swiss Artist in America / Karl Bodmer: Ein Schweizer Künstler in Amerika. Scheidegger & Spiess Zürich 2009. German and English.
- Inuit – Leben am Rande der Welt / Inuit – Life at the Edge of the World. 141 photographs and 7 panoramic Images by Markus Bühler-Rasom, black and white and in color. Kontrast Verlag, Zurich, 2007. German and English. Including booklet ("Reisetagebuch") "Travel diary" in German or English. ISBN 978-3-906729-55-8 (German), ISBN 978-3-906729-59-6 (English).
- Reich geschmückt – Indianischer Schmuck aus Arizona und New Mexico. NONAM, Zurich 2007. German.
- Kanu Kajak – Boote der Indianer und Inuit. NONAM, Zurich 2007. German.
- Aiguuq! – Arktische Schätze aus Schweizer Museen. NONAM, Zurich 2008. German.
- Traditions of Change – Neue Kunst der Athapasken und Tlingit aus dem Yukon. NONAM, Zurich 2005. German.

== See also ==
- List of museums in Switzerland
