= Missouri Valley Heritage Alliance =

American nonprofit organization

- Abbreviation: MVHA
- Predecessor: Fort Abraham Lincoln Foundation
- Formation: 1982
- Type: Nonprofit
- Headquarters: Bismarck, North Dakota
- Website: fortlincoln.org

The Missouri Valley Heritage Alliance (MVHA), formerly the Fort Abraham Lincoln Foundation, is a nonprofit organization in Bismarck, North Dakota. FALF was established in 1982 to improve programming and infrastructure at Fort Abraham Lincoln State Park. The partnership concluded in 2013 and the foundation focused instead on heritage education and tourism by improving tours on the Lewis and Clark Riverboat, expanding Five Nations Art, and renovating The Post, an event venue. FALF rebranded as the Missouri Valley Heritage Alliance in 2017.

MVHA purchased land along the Missouri River at the Port of Bismarck after the existing buildings, including Captain Meriwether's Landing, were destroyed by floods in 2011. Construction began on the MVHA's new building, a 4,400 square feet (410 m^{2}) community center called the Landing, in 2018. After delays due to the COVID-19 pandemic, the building was completed in 2022 and houses an event space and the Huckleberry House restaurant in addition to educational information and a ticket counter for riverboat tours. The Landing also serves as the interpretive headquarters to all other member organizations of the Northern Plains Heritage Area, which covers 80 miles along the Missouri River and was dedicated as a national heritage area in 2009.
