= Mitutanka =

Former village of the Mandan

Coordinates: 47.286561°N 101.333164°W

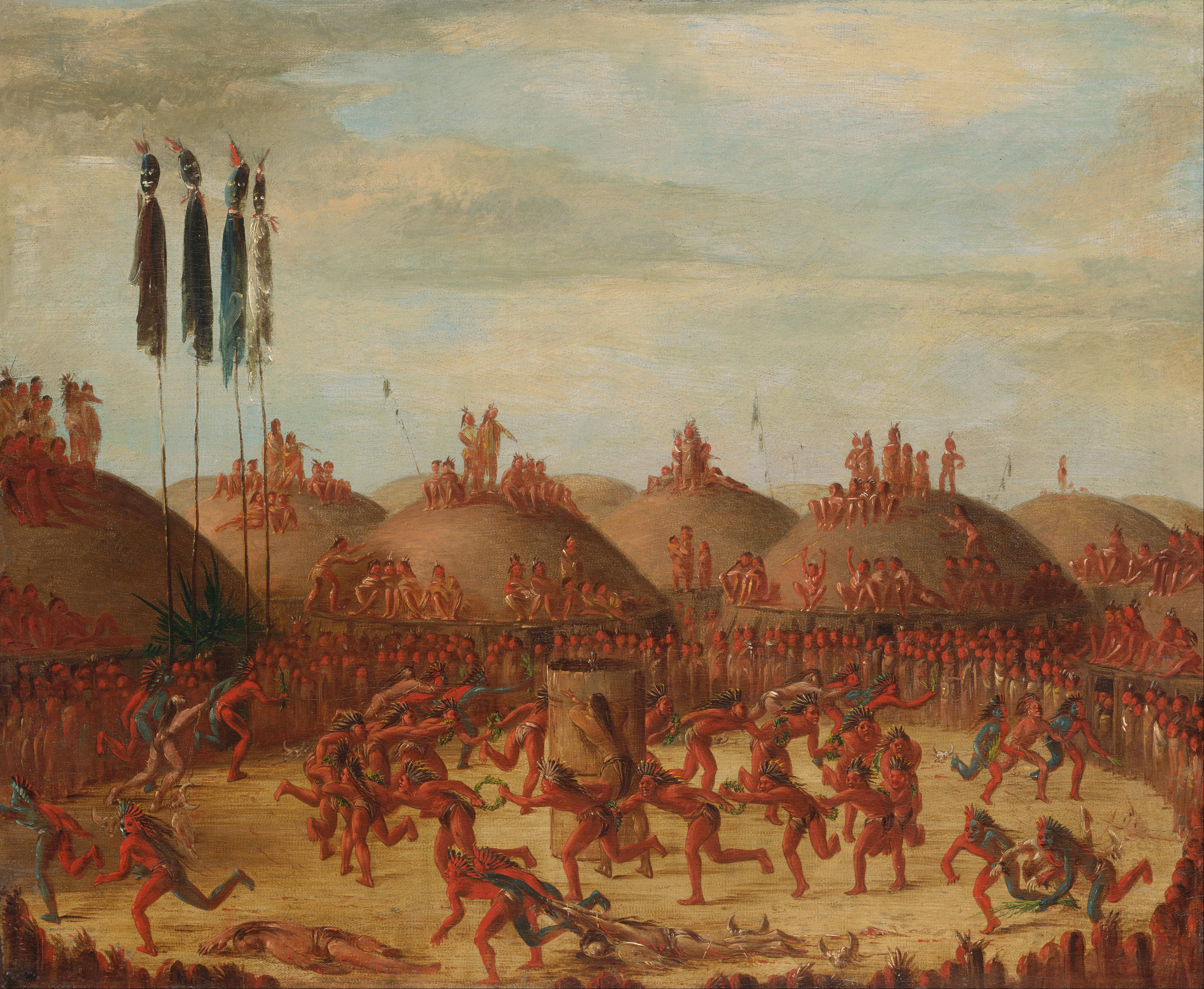
George Catlin's The Last Race, Mandan O-kee-pa Ceremony. The village Indians on the Upper Missouri lived in towns of earth lodges like this.

Mitutanka, also known as Mih-tutta-hang-kusch or Matootonah, was the lower Mandan village at the time of the Lewis and Clark Expedition. At the time that Lewis and Clark visited the main chief was Sheheke.

After a catastrophic smallpox epidemic, the Nuitadi Mandans of Good Boy moved north and later built Mitutanka at the confluence of the Knife River with the Missouri River. Mitutanka was on the west Bank while the Ruptare town of Ruptare was on the east bank of the Missouri.
