= Sheheke =

Mandan chief

Big White
- Shehéke Shóote
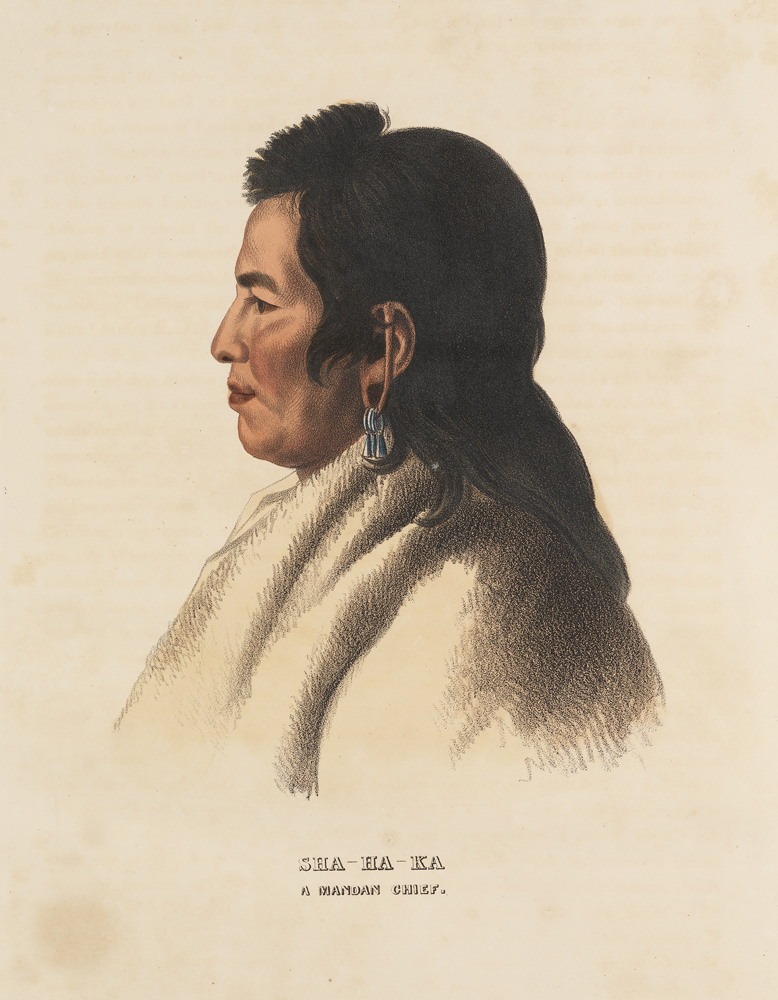
- "Sha-Ha-Ka, A Mandan Chief" from History of the Indian Tribes of North America
- Born: c. 1766
- Died: 1812
- Known for: Lewis and Clark Expedition
- Title: Tribal chief

Sheheke or Sheheke-shote (Mandan: Shehéke Shóote), translated as White Coyote and also known as Coyote or Big White (c. 1766–1812), was a Mandan chief.

His name is also sometimes spelled Shahaka.

Sheheke was at the time of the arrival of Meriwether Lewis and William Clark among the Mandan in late 1804 the main civil chief at Mitutanka.

Sheheke traveled with Lewis and Clark to meet United States President Thomas Jefferson. On October 20, 1804, two Mandan leaders, each considering himself the principal chief of Matutonka, came to visit the captains. Having missed the previous day's meeting, they asked the Americans to repeat their speeches. "They were gratified," Clark reported, "and we put the medal on the neck of the Big White to whom we had Sent Clothes yesterday and a flag." The captains meant well, but they only worsened an enmity between the Mandan leaders.

Upon the explorers' return in late August 1806, Sheheke reaffirmed his friendship, and promised that his people would "Shake off all intimacy with the Sioux and unite themselves in a strong alliance and attend to what we had told them.” Amid good feelings all around, they smoked, and took a walk together. "The Mandan Chief," Clark observed, "was Saluted by Several Chiefs and brave men on his way with me to the river."

The captains, still eager to fulfill Jefferson's wish to show Native American leaders the advantages of American culture and civilization, invited Sheheke to return to the East with them, but their gesture only ignited old rivalries, and they had to rely on the able diplomacy of the trader and interpreter René Jusseaume to untangle the situation. Sheheke finally agreed to go if he could take his wife and son, and if Jusseaume could take his family along, too.

Lewis and Clark returned from their expedition, bringing with them the Mandan Chief Shehaka from the Upper Missouri to visit the "Great Father" at Washington City.

When Lewis was appointed Governor of Louisiana Territory, he sent Chief Shehaka up the Missouri with an escort of about 40 United States troops under the command of Captain Nathaniel Pryor. On their arrival to the country of Rickarees, a warlike tribe attacked the Mandans and killed eight or ten soldiers while the rest retreated with Sheheke to St. Louis. With the formation of the Missouri Fur Company, an expedition was proposed to head up the Missouri and into the Rocky Mountains during Spring of 1809. Lewis contracted with the company to convey the Mandan Chief back to his tribe for the sum of $10,000<modern equivalent?>. General Thomas James wrote a journal of how he enlisted in this expedition during his youth. The money was raised for trading with the Native Americans and trapping beaver along the headwaters of the Missouri and Columbia rivers. The total party consisted of 350 men.

After his visit east, and because of resistance from Sioux and Arikara warriors, Sheheke's return home required two attempts in two years, involving a collective force of more than 600 soldiers and costing $20,000 plus four American lives.

Sheheke was killed in the fall of 1812 in a battle with Hidatsa Indians.
