= Karl Bodmer =

Swiss-French artist (1809–1893)

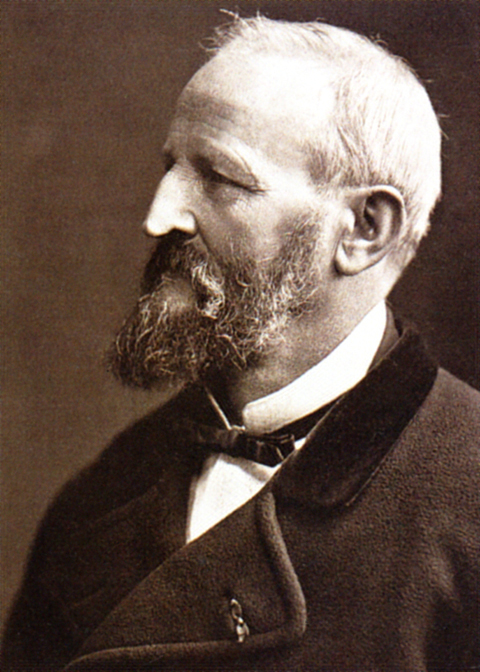
- Bodmer depicted in a Woodburytype portrait in 1877
- Born: Karl Bodmer; 11 February 1809; Zürich, Switzerland
- Died: 30 October 1893 (aged 84); Paris, France
- Patrons: Prince Maximilian of Wied-Neuwied

Johann Carl Bodmer (11 February 1809 – 30 October 1893) was a Swiss-French printmaker, etcher, lithographer, zinc engraver, draughtsman, painter, illustrator, and hunter. Known as Karl Bodmer in literature and paintings, his name was recorded as Johann Karl Bodmer and Jean-Charles Bodmer, respectively. After 1843, likely as a result of the birth of his son Charles-Henry Barbizon, he began to sign his works K Bodmer.

Bodmer was well known in Germany for his watercolours, drawings, and aquatints of cities and landscapes of the Rhine, Mosel, and Lahn rivers. After he moved to France following his return from an expedition in the American West, he became a member of the Barbizon School, a French landscape painting group from the mid-19th century. He created many oil paintings with animal and landscape motifs, wood engravings, drawings, and book illustrations. For his work, Bodmer was made a Knight in the French Legion of Honour in 1877.

He is best known in the United States as a painter who captured the American frontier of the 19th century. He painted extremely accurate works of its inhabitants and landscape. He accompanied the German explorer Prince Maximilian zu Wied-Neuwied from 1832 through 1834 on his Missouri River expedition. Bodmer was hired as an artist by Maximilian in order to accompany his expedition and record images of cities, rivers, towns, and peoples they saw along the way, including the many tribes of Native Americans along the Missouri River and in that region.

Bodmer had 81 aquatints made from his work to illustrate Prince Maximilian's book, Maximilian Prince of Wied's Travels in the Interior of North America, published in 1839 in German and in English in 1843.

== Early life ==
Johann Carl Bodmer was born on 11 February 1809 in Zürich, Switzerland. When he was thirteen, his mother’s brother, Johann Jakob Meier, a prominent engraver, became Bodmer's teacher. Meier was an artist, having studied under the well-known artists Heinrich Füssli and Gabriel Lory. Young Bodmer and his older brother, Rudolf, joined their uncle on artistic travels throughout their home country.

== Missouri River expedition ==
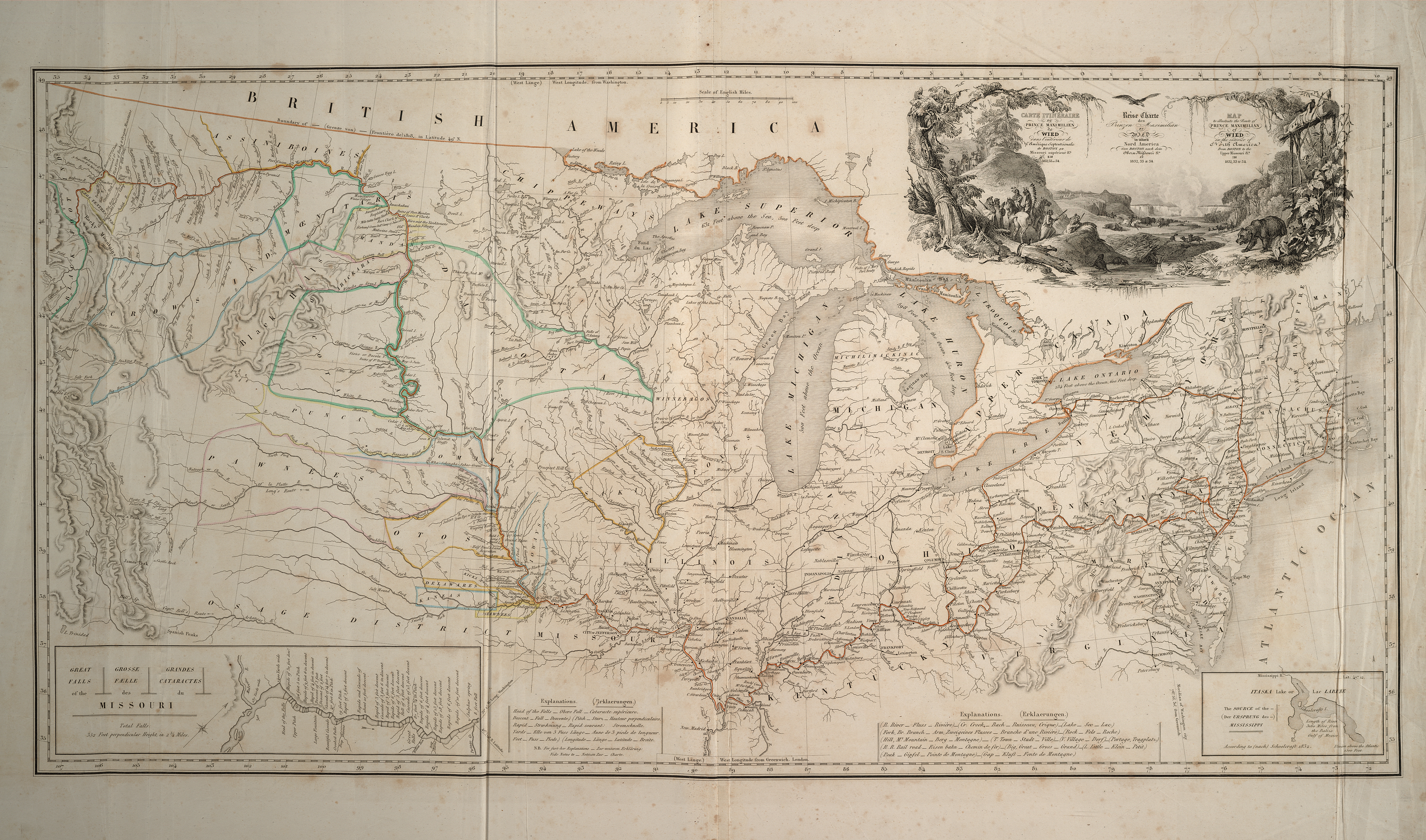
Map of Bodmer's travels in North America between 1832 and 1834

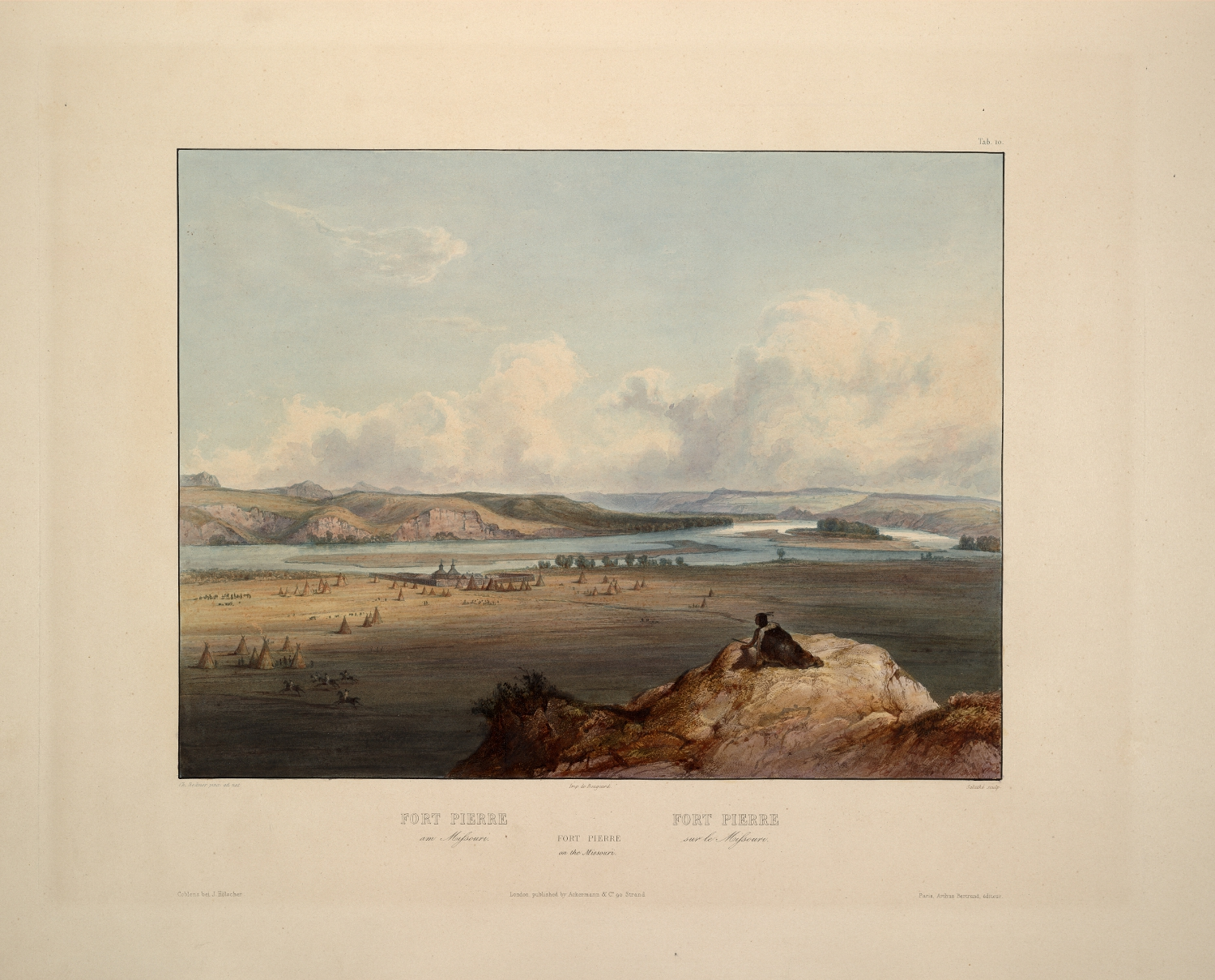
Fort Pierre on the Missouri an aquatint from Maximilian, Prince of Wied’s Travels in the Interior of North America (1843-1844)

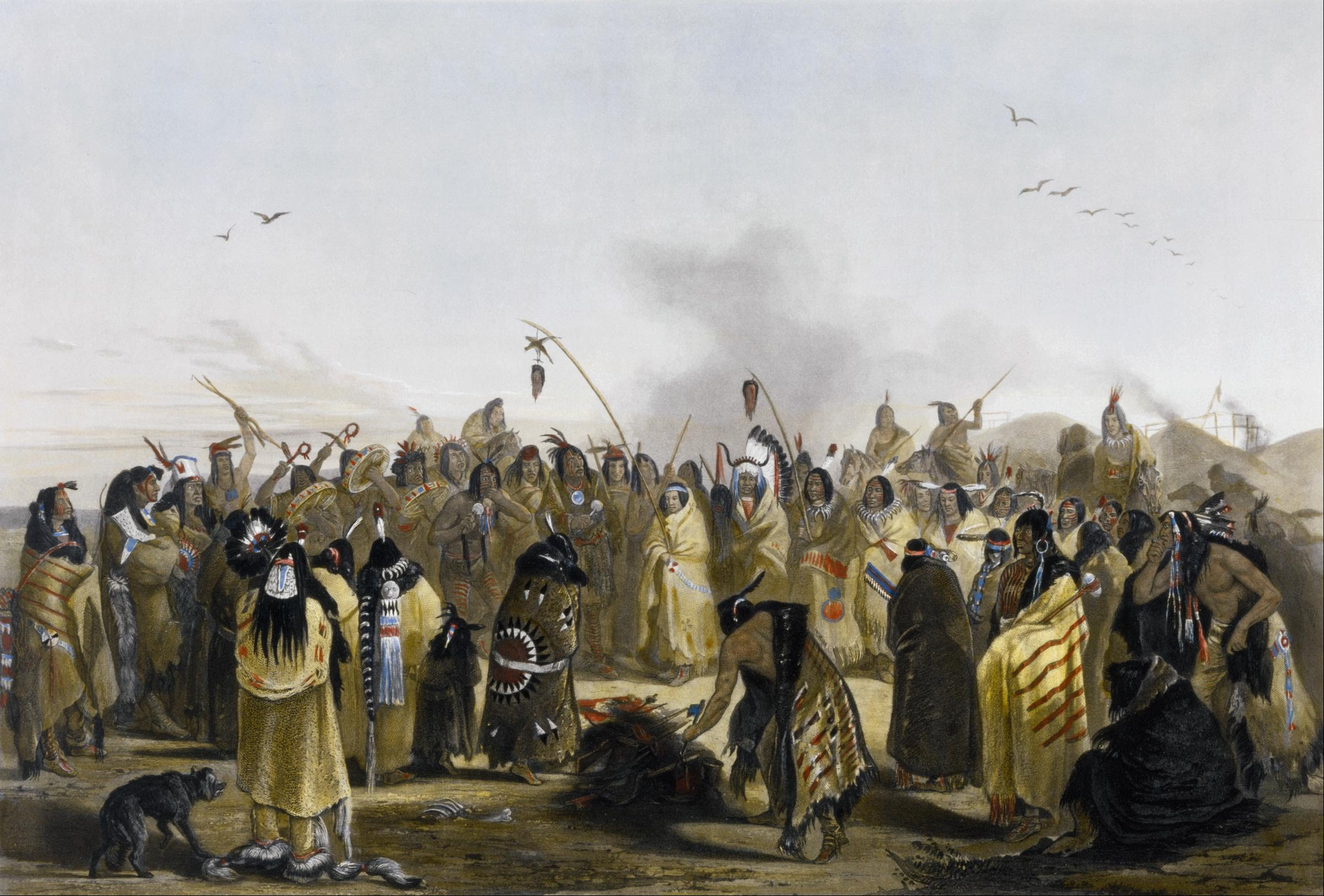
Scalp Dance of the Minitarres

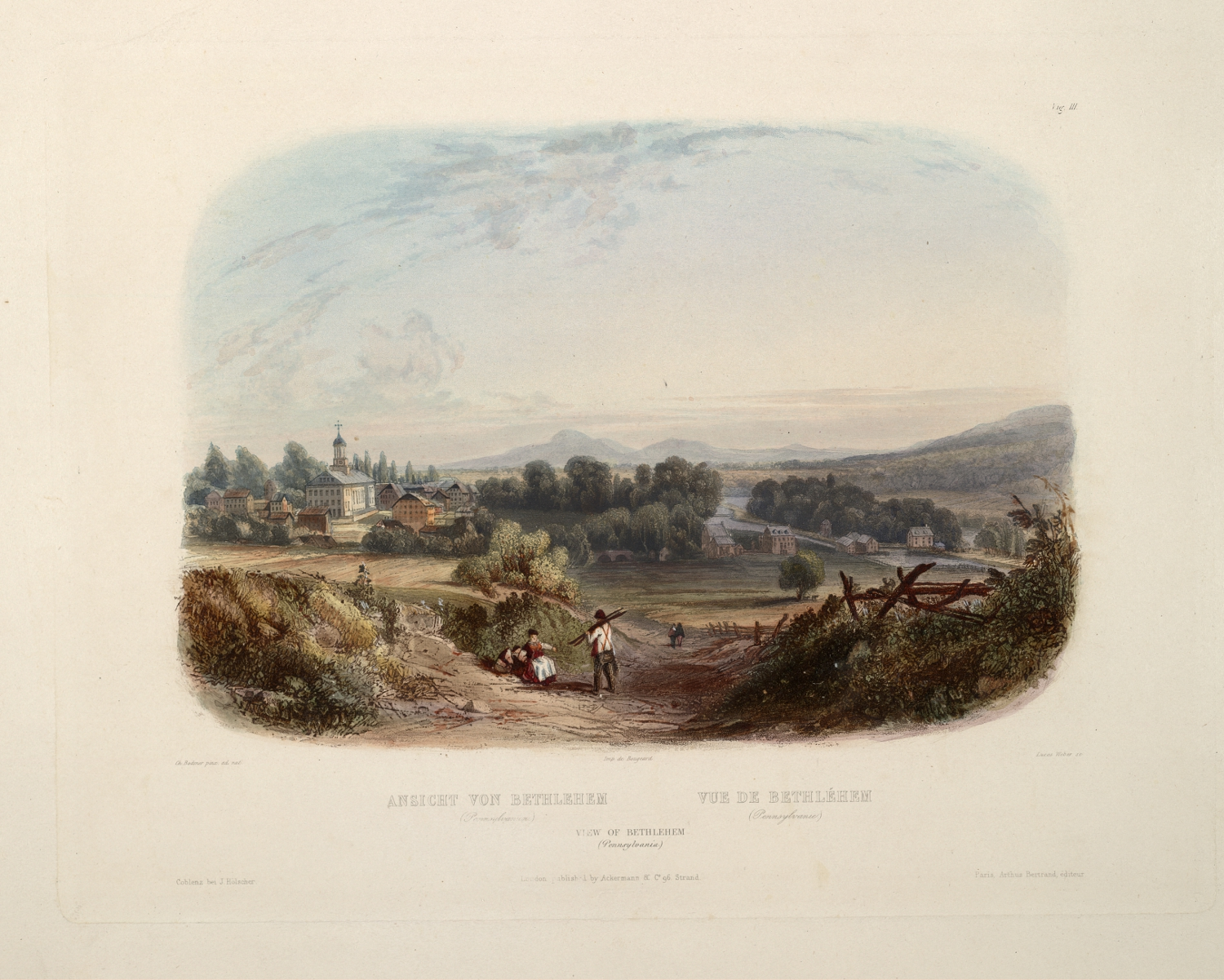
View of Bethlehem, an 1832 aquatint of Bethlehem, Pennsylvania by Bodmer

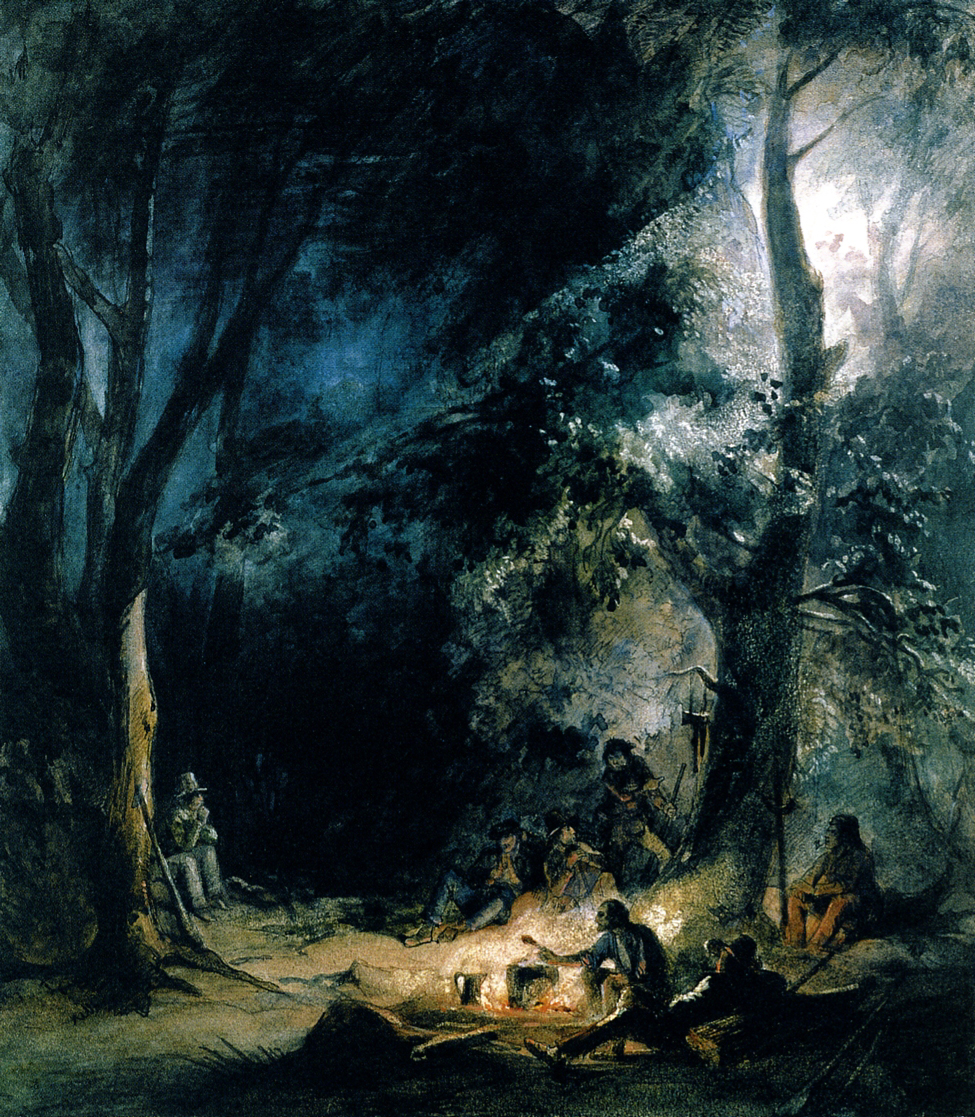
A Stop; Evening Bivouac, 1833

By 1828, Bodmer had left his native Switzerland to work as a painter and engraver in the German city of Koblenz. It was there that he and his work came to the attention of Prinz Maximilian zu Wied-Neuwied. This German aristocrat had successfully led a scientific expedition to Brazil in 1815–1817. He decided to embark on another such venture, this time to North America and especially the American West. He hired Bodmer to accompany his expedition and make a visual record of the places and peoples encountered, through painting, drawings, etc. The aristocrat was known popularly to naturalists then and now as Prince Max.

After delays, Bodmer, in the company of Prince Max and David Dreidoppel, a huntsman and taxidermist, sailed for North America on 17 May 1832. In a letter on that date, Prince Max wrote to his brother that Bodmer "is a lively, very good man and companion, seems well educated, and is very pleasant and very suitable for me; I am glad I picked him. He makes no demands, and in diligence he is never lacking."

Arriving in Boston, Massachusetts, on 4 July, the three encountered hardships and delays caused largely by a cholera epidemic in the eastern states. It swept across the northern tier to Michigan via travelers on the waterways. The three men finally reached Pittsburgh, and started from there October 8 to travel west along the Ohio River. They arrived in Mt. Vernon, Indiana about midnight on 18 October. The next morning, the party made their way to New Harmony, Indiana.

Prince Max had planned to spend only a few days in New Harmony, but his stay "was prolonged by serious indisposition, nearly resembling cholera, to a four months' winter residence." The Prince devotes a chapter of his book of the expedition to New Harmony and its environs. He featured the work and personalities of Thomas Say and Charles-Alexandre Lesueur, two leading American naturalists. Lesueur was also a prolific artist.

Unlike the Prince and Dreidoppel, Bodmer escaped the illness. Alone, he left New Harmony at the end of December, and on 3 January 1833 caught a steamboat at Mt. Vernon, Indiana. He traveled down the Mississippi River to New Orleans, spending a week with Joseph Barrabino. This Italian-American naturalist was a friend of Say and Lesueur. (A fine pencil portrait of Barrabino, drawn by Lesueur, is preserved at the New Harmony Workingmen's Institute.)

In April 1833, Prince Max, Bodmer and Dreidoppel set out from St. Louis on the 2,500-mile journey by steamboat and later keelboat up the Missouri River. They eventually traveled as far as Fort McKenzie (near present-day Fort Benton, Montana). After wintering at Fort Clark near the Mandan villages, they returned downriver the following spring, having spent more than a year on the Upper Missouri. Bodmer had extensively documented the journey with visual images, while Prince Max took copious notes for the book he intended to write.

After completing the expedition, Bodmer returned to Germany with Prince Maximilian, then traveled to France. In Paris he had many of his paintings from the expedition (81 in total) reproduced as aquatints. The Prince had these images incorporated into his book of the expedition, which was first published in German in Koblenz as Reise in das innere Nord-Amerika in den Jahren 1832 bis 1834 in two volumes from 1839 to 1841. Its English translation, Maximilian Prince of Wied’s Travels in the Interior of North America, during the years 1832–1834, was published in London in 1843–1844.

Bodmer then moved to Barbizon, France, and later became a French citizen. Recorded as Jean-Charles Bodmer, he went by "Charles Bodmer". He became a member of the Barbizon School, a group of painters who specialized in landscapes and works featuring animals. He worked in a variety of genres, including painting, etching, wood engraving, and illustration. Among his well-known works from this period was La Foret en Hiver (Interior of the forest in winter), exhibited at the Salon 1850 in Paris. It was painted at Fontainebleau forest. Bodmer also made an engraving of his painting, and reproductions were popular in the 1860s. Impressionist Claude Monet later painted the same trees, titling his painting The Bodmer Oak. This scene was the subject as well of numerous photographs in the 1870s.

His last years were difficult, as his illustrations became out of style, and he was affected by illness and poverty.

== Death ==
Bodmer died in Paris, shortly after receiving his French citizenship. He is buried in Chailly-en-Bière, at the entrance of the Fontainebleau forest. His three sons, Charles, Rodolphe and Henri, were colorful characters of the community of artists and poachers in Barbizon.

== Legacy ==
Although Bodmer is still relatively unknown in France, a first exhibition was dedicated to his works in September 2021 in Barbizon.

=== Joslyn Art Museum ===
The Joslyn Art Museum in Omaha, Nebraska is home to the largest of three known collections of Bodmer's watercolors, drawings, and prints. Bodmer captured a challenging and dramatic landscape that was still unfamiliar to audiences in the eastern United States and Europe.

His portraits were the first accurate portrayal of western Indians in their homelands, and they are considered remarkable for their careful detail and sensitivity to the personalities of his sitters. To this day, Bodmer's work remains one of the most perceptive and compelling visual accounts of the American interior. Bodmer's work is recognised as among the most accurate painted images ever made of Native Americans, their culture and artifacts, and of the scenery of the pristine "Old West".

== Gallery ==
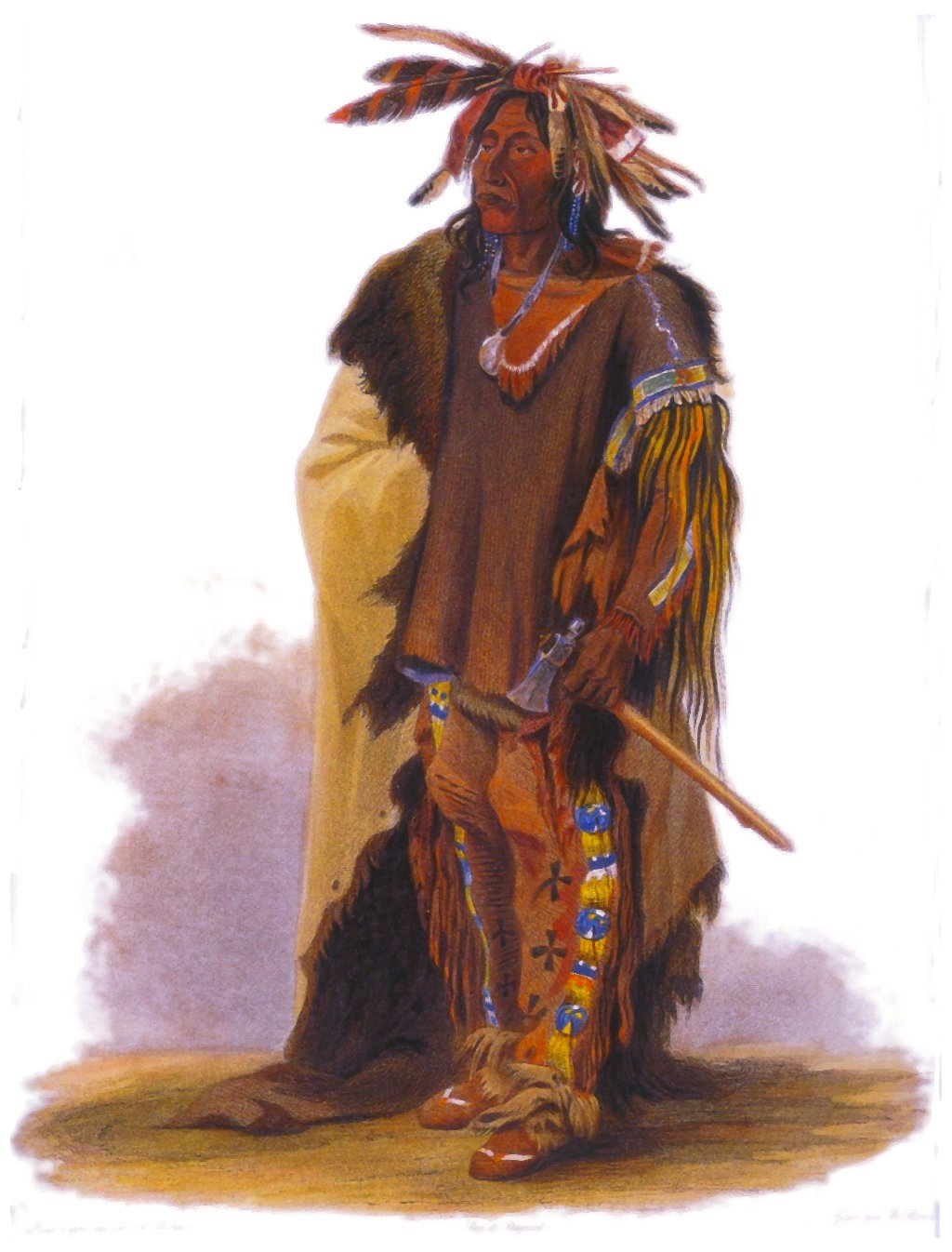
Dacota warrior

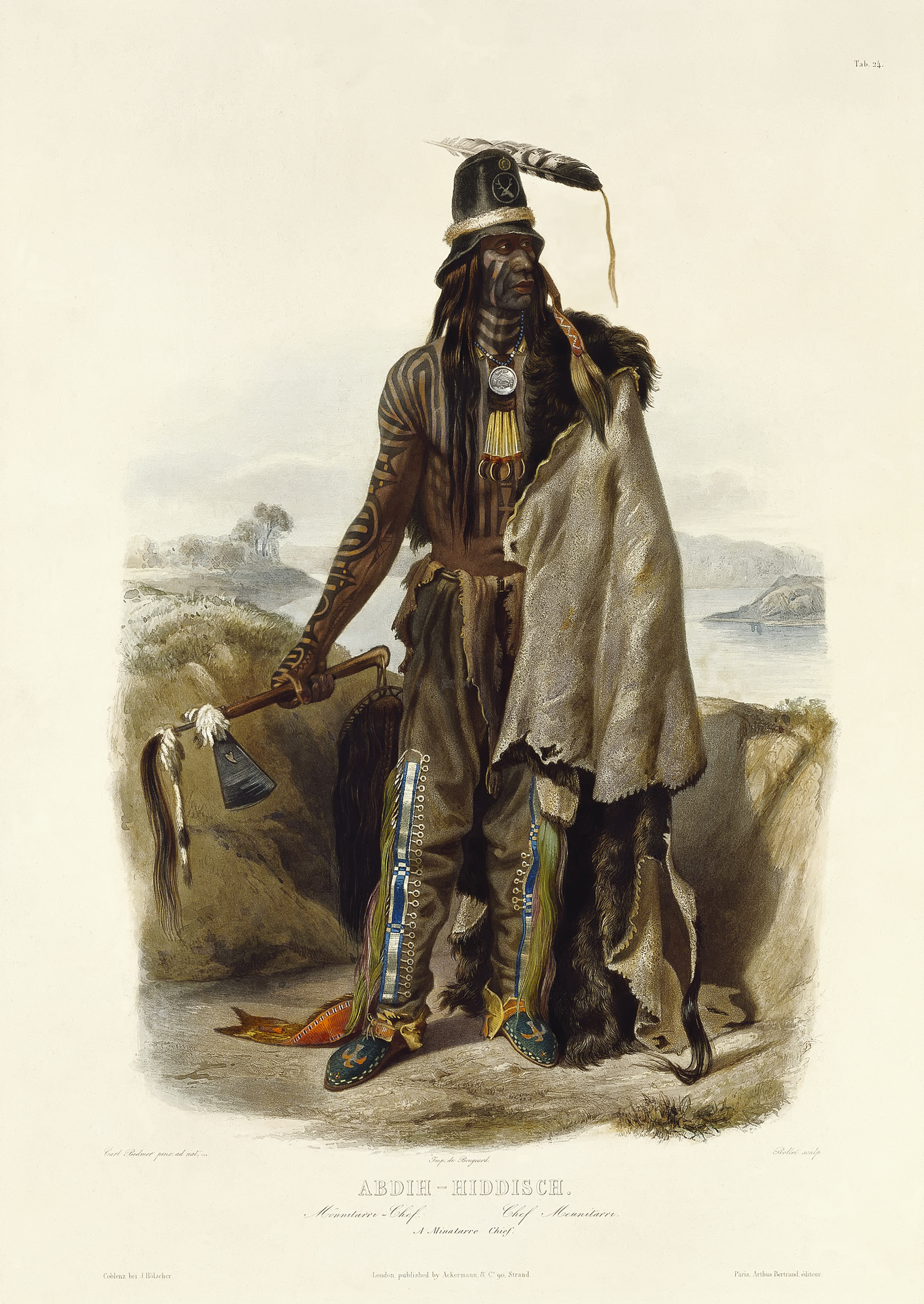
Abdih-Hiddisch. A Minatarre Chief

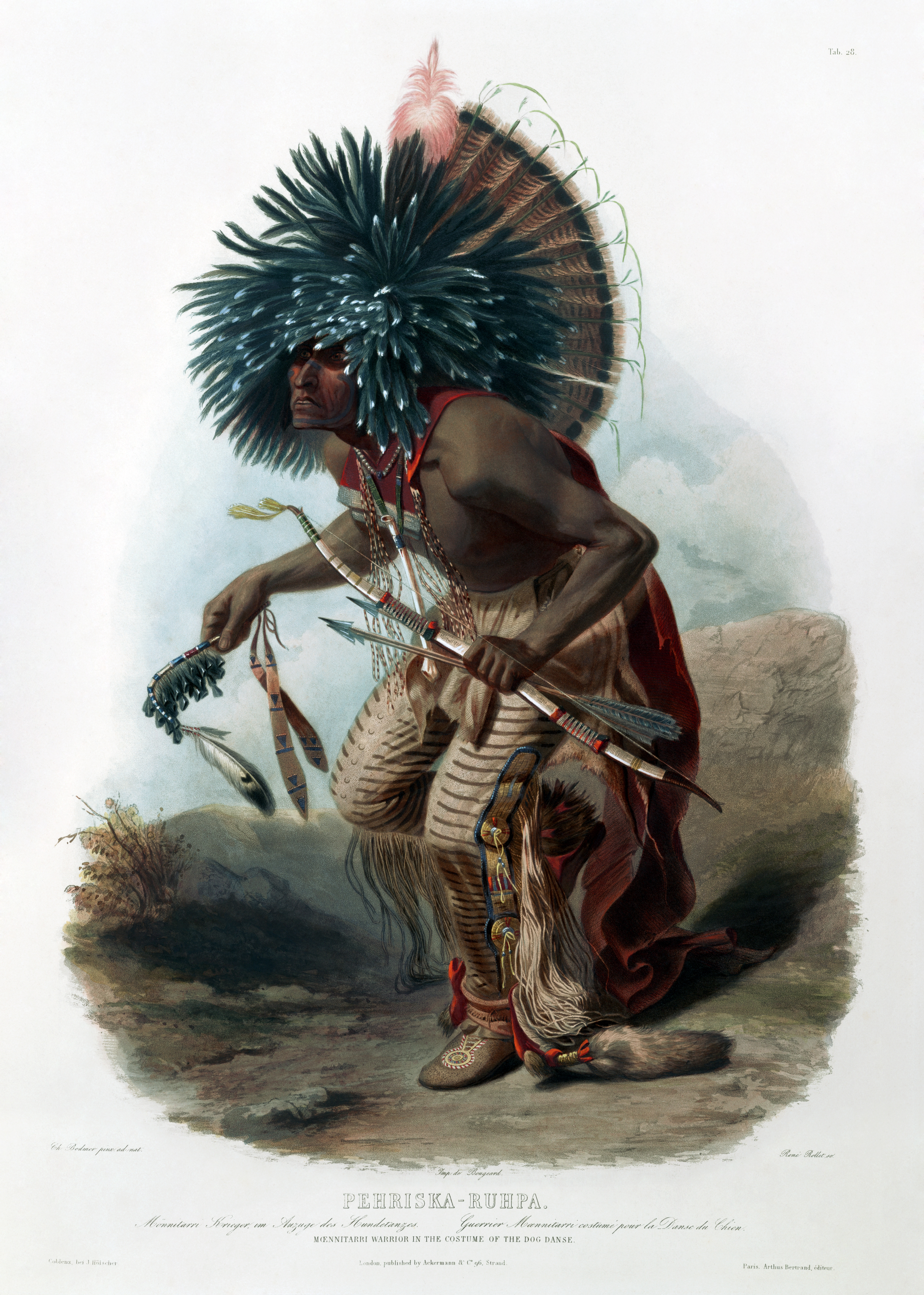
Pehriska-Ruhpa of the Dog Society of the Hidatsa tribe of Native Americans

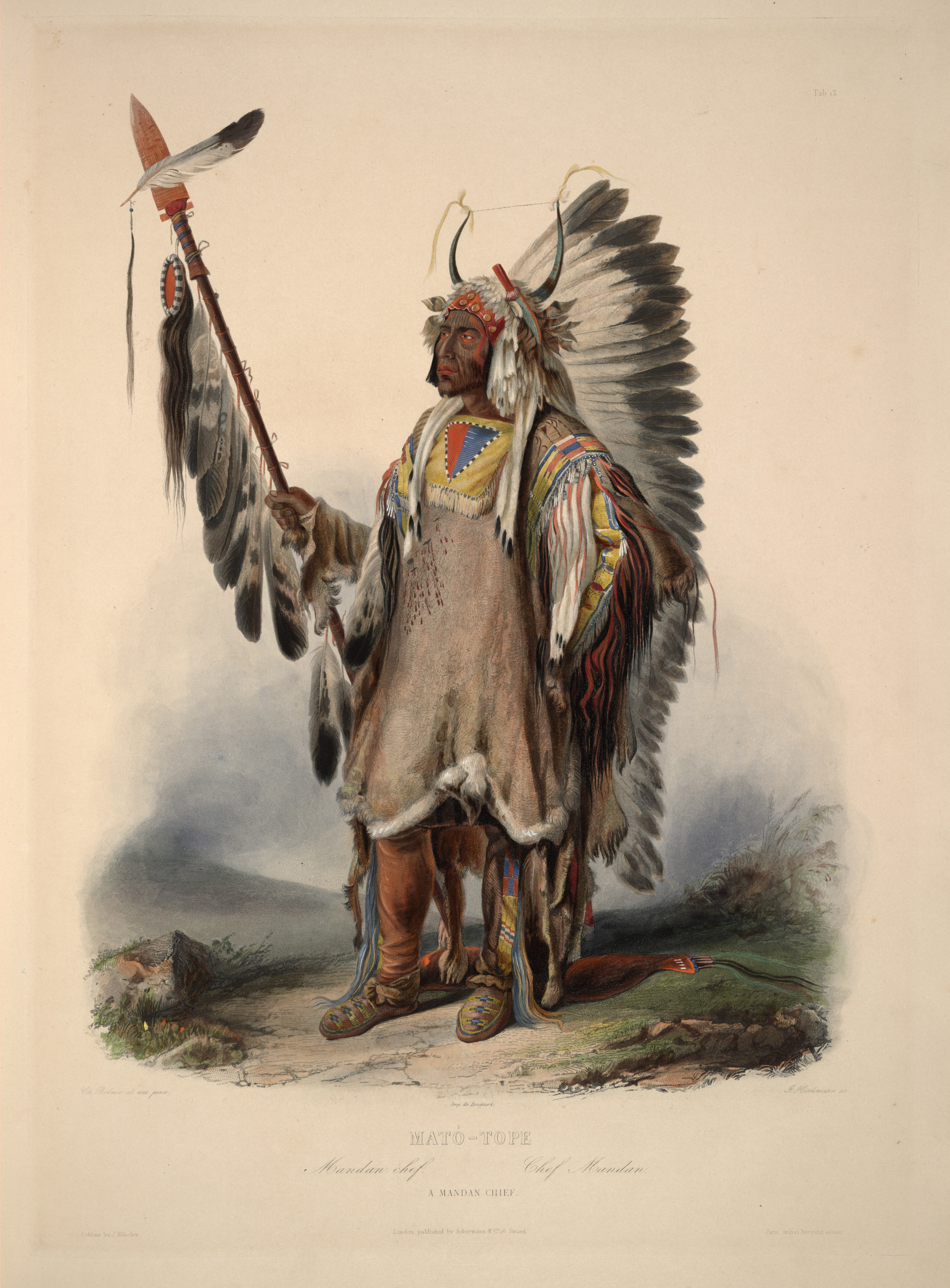
Mato-tope holding a lance and wearing painted and quilled shirt of the Mandan
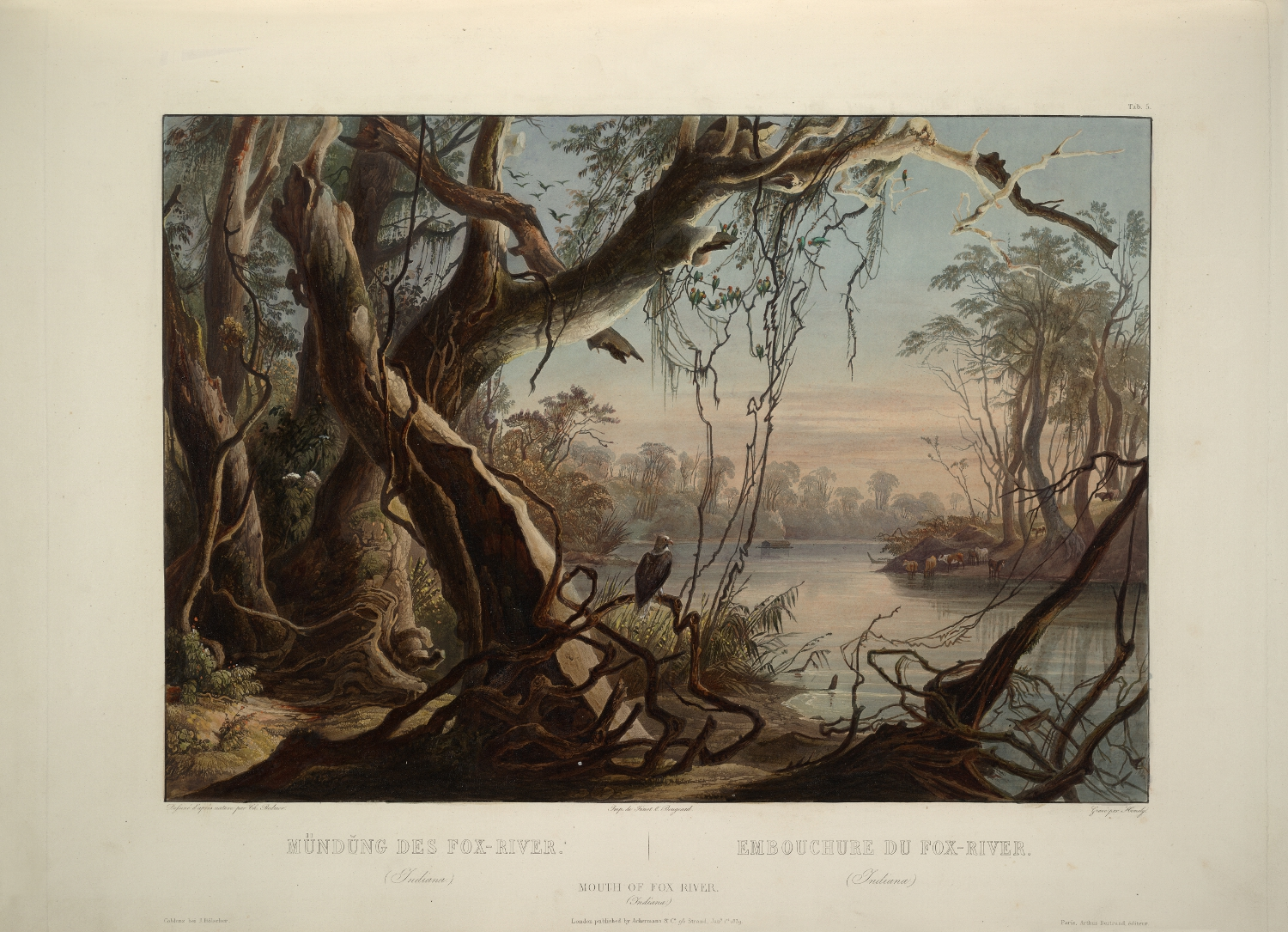
Aquatint illustration from the book "Maximilian, Prince of Wied’s Travels in the Interior of North America, during the years 1832–1834".

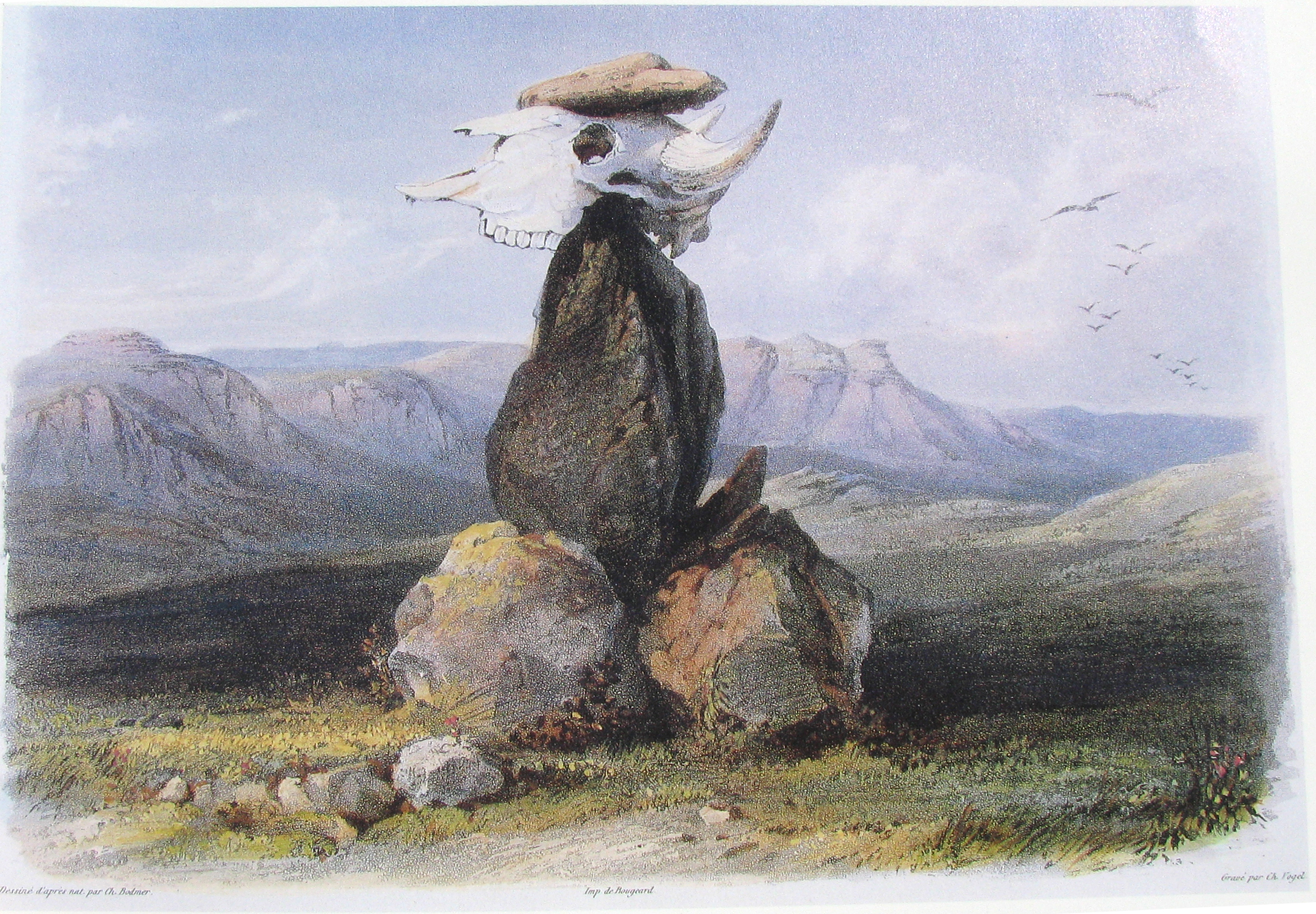
Magic Pile of Assinboin Indians

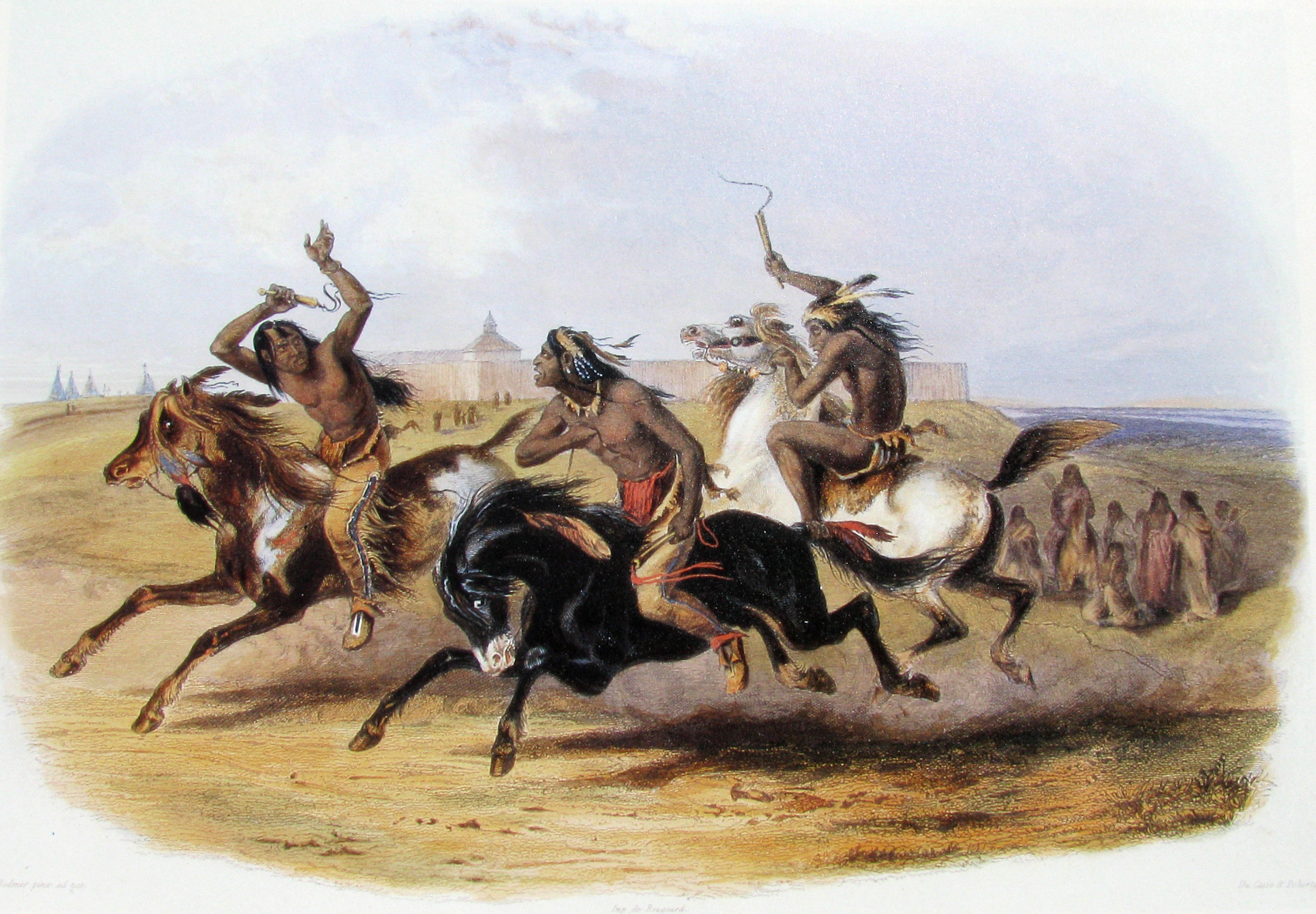
Horse Racing of the Sioux

== See also ==
- North America Native Museum
