= Bella Weitzner =

American curator (1891–1988)

- Born: October 24, 1891; New York, New York, U.S.
- Died: April 3, 1988 (age 96); New York, New York, U.S.
- Occupations: Anthropologist, museum curator

Bella Weitzner (October 24, 1891 – April 3, 1988) was an American anthropologist and museum curator. She was associated with the American Museum of Natural History for eighty years, beginning in 1908.

== Biography ==
Weitzner was born in New York City, the daughter of Jacob Samuel Weitzner and Anna Zauderer Weitzner. Her parents were both immigrants from Eastern Europe. Her brother Emil Weitzner was a prominent lawyer and author.

Weitzner joined the staff of the American Museum of Natural History in 1908, when she became anthropologist Clark Wissler's secretary. She was named associate curator of anthropology in 1935 and officially retired in 1956, but continued to be involved with the museum for decades afterward. She co-curated the original permanent exhibit in the museum's Northwest Coast Hall, with Franz Boas, Pliny Earle Goddard, and Stanley A. Freed.

Weitzner was treasurer of the American Anthropological Association. and a fellow of the American Ethnological Society; she attended conferences of other professional organizations. She organized loans of the museum's holdings for exhibits elsewhere, and taught classes at Columbia University. She and Harry L. Shapiro were scientific advisors to the documentary film The lost art of the Tlingit of Alaska (1957), by Oshin Agathon.

Weitzner died in 1988, at the age of 97.

== Publications ==
- "The Hidatsa earthlodge" (1934, with Gilbert Livingston Wilson, who died in 1930)
- "A Year by Year Summary of the Department of Anthropology, 1871-1952"
- "Notes on the Hidatsa Indians based on data recorded by the late Gilbert L. Wilson" (1979)
