= Buffalo Bird Woman =

Hidatsa writer, gardener, indigenous agriculturalist

- Hidatsa: Maaxiiriwia
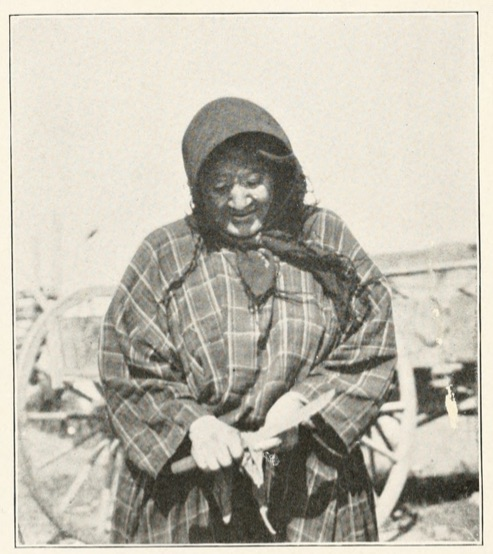
- Maxi'diwiac, Photographed in 1910

Hidatsa leader

Personal details
- Born: ca. 1839 Knife River
- Died: 1932 Fort Berthold Reservation, North Dakota
- Relations: Brother, Henry Wolf Chief; grandmother, Otter; adopted grandmother, Turtle
- Children: Edward Goodbird
- Parent(s): Father, Small Ankle, mother, Want-to-be-a-woman; stepmothers, Red Blossom and Strikes-many-women
- Known for: Recording Hidatsa gardening, agriculture, and culture

Waheenee, also referred to as the Buffalo Bird Woman (ca. 1839–1932) was a traditional Hidatsa woman who lived on the Fort Berthold Reservation in North Dakota. Her Hidatsa name was Waheenee, though she was also called Maaxiiriwia (variously transcribed as Maxidiwiac and Maxi'diwiac).

She was known for maintaining the traditional lifestyle of the Hidatsa, including gardening, cooking, and household tasks. She passed on the traditional ways of her culture and oral tradition through interviews with Gilbert Wilson, in which she described her own experience and the lives and work of Hidatsa women.

== Biography ==
=== Early life ===
Waheenee was born to Want-to-be-a-woman and Small Ankle, both of the Native American Hidatsa tribe. The exact date of her birth is unknown, but is believed to be circa 1839. She also had a brother, Wolf Chief.

Recovering after a smallpox epidemic in 1837, the Hidatsa moved to the newly created Like-a-Fishhook Village in North Dakota in 1845. Waheenee was four years old at the time. The Hidatsa was joined by the Mandan and, in 1863, the Arikara tribes as well. Together, the tribes are known as the Three Affiliated Tribes.

When she was six, Waheenee's mother died of smallpox during another outbreak. From that time, she was raised by her grandmother Turtle and her great-grandmother's adopted daughter Otter.

Waheenee was declared her official name at a naming ceremony when she was ten. However, Small Ankle began to call her Maaxiiriwia, which translates to Buffalo Bird Woman. This is the name by which she is most commonly known.

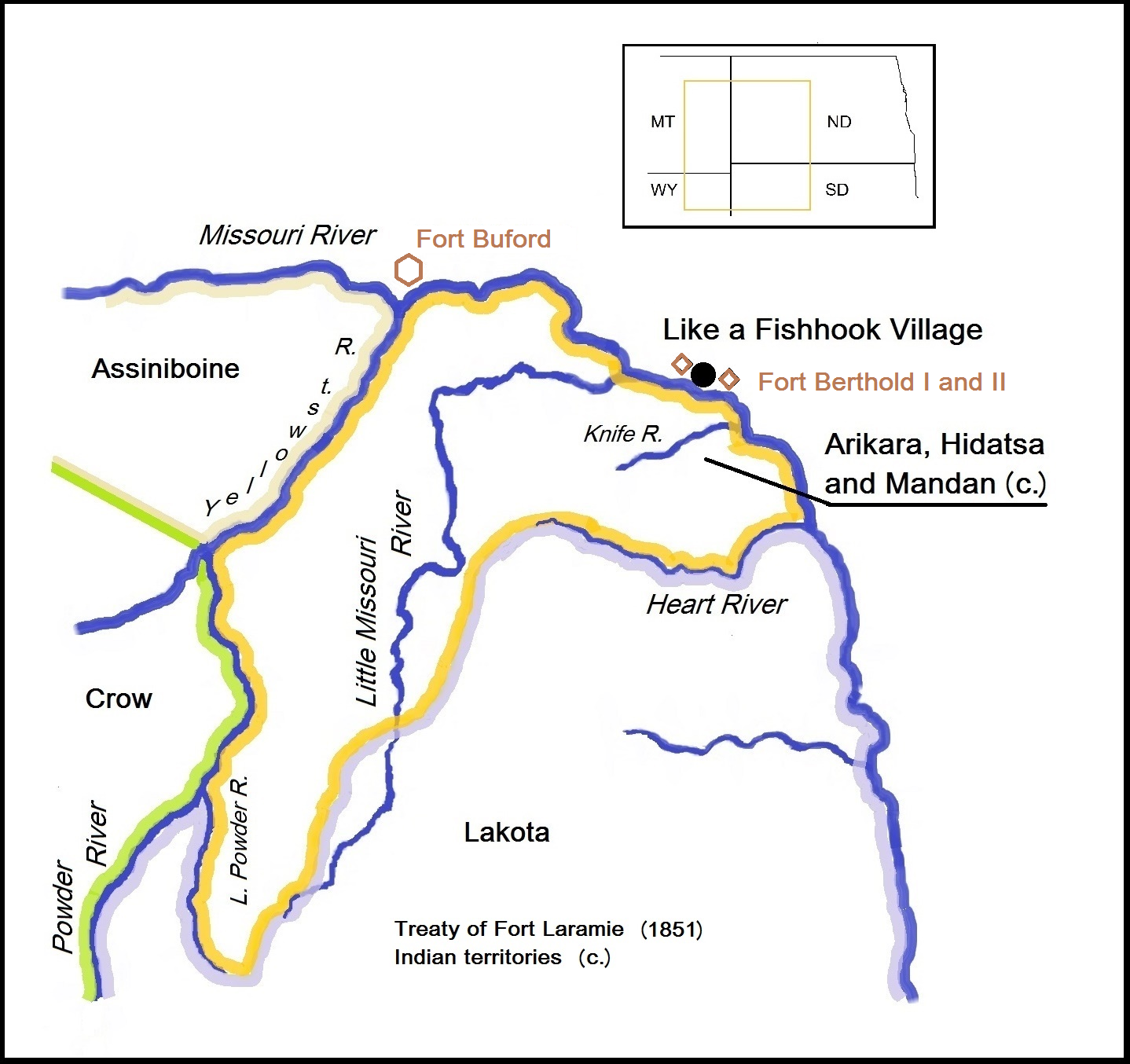
A map denoting the locations of Like-a-Fishhook Village and Fort Berthold Indian Reservation, the locations in which Buffalo Bird Woman lived most of her life.

=== Adulthood ===
Waheenee married twice. Her first husband, Magpie, died of tuberculosis. She later married Son-of-a-star. In 1869, the two had their only child, Tsaka'kasakic, commonly known as Edward Goodbird.

Around 1885, the tribes began to move to the land along the Missouri River. The area that was settled came to be known as the Fort Berthold Reservation.

Waheenee spent the majority of her adulthood on the Reservation, populated by the Three Affiliated Tribes. She gardened using traditional Hidatsa agricultural styles throughout her life. She never learned to speak English. Her brother Wolf Chief, by contrast, had learned English, converted to Christianity, and added Henry as his first name.

== Buffalo Bird Woman's Garden ==
Waheenee's connection to greater United States society came about through her son. Edward Goodbird, who had gone to mission school and become a pastor, and was fluent in four languages. He established a connection with ethnographer Gilbert Wilson, who was visiting Fort Berthold in 1906. Between 1907 and 1918, Wilson conducted interviews with Waheenee, Henry Wolf Chief, and Goodbird. Conversations with the former were the basis of his doctoral dissertation, Buffalo Bird Woman's Garden: Agriculture of the Hidatsa Indians. Wilson published the dissertation in the University of Minnesota's Studies in the Social Sciences academic journal in 1917. The thesis led to his receiving the first Ph.D. in anthropology from the University of Minnesota.

Buffalo Bird Woman's Garden: Agriculture of the Hidatsa Indians is the work for which Waheenee is best known. Originally titled Agriculture of the Hidatsa Indians: An Indian Interpretation, the book is a compilation of information from Buffalo Bird Woman about Hidatsa harvesting practices. The interviews which make up the majority of the content were conducted and edited by Wilson, with Goodbird acting as interpreter.

The majority of Wilson's book informs readers of Hidatsa agricultural practices. However, the interviews covered other subjects as well, which are also included in the book. Buffalo Bird Woman also discusses the Hidatsa's origin myths, history of her tribe, and cultural practices. The book also has photographs of an elderly Waheenee gardening. Goodbird's drawings of maps and of Hidatsa agricultural tools, based on Waheenee's own tools, are included as well.

The interviews and stories told by Waheenee were left essentially unchanged by Wilson in the dissertation. As he explains of his work in the foreword, "It is an Indian woman's interpretation of economics; the thoughts she gave to her fields; the philosophy of her labors." Wilson also mentions that he hopes that his account will lead to better treatment for all Indians once readers understand the work that went into Buffalo Bird Woman's life.

=== Contents ===
- Foreword
- Chapter I- Tradition
- Chapter II- Beginning a garden
- Chapter III- Sunflowers
- Chapter IV- Corn
- Chapter V- Squashes
- Chapter VI- Beans
- Chapter VII- Storing for winter
- Chapter VIII- The making of a drying stage
- Chapter IX- Tools
- Chapter X- Fields as Like-a-Fishhook Village
- Chapter XI- Miscellanea
- Chapter XII- Since the white men came
- Chapter XIII- Tobacco

== Other books ==
Wilson published several more works about the Hidatsa. Goodbird the Indian, published in 1914, reveals further details of her son's life. Waheenee: An Indian Girl's Story, Told by Herself, published in 1921, is an autobiography of Waheenee and Goodbird. The books were also conducted through transcribed interviews.

== Legacy ==
Waheenee is today remembered for her accounts of traditional Hidatsa life as well as for her gardening techniques. Copies of Buffalo Bird Woman's Garden, complied in Wilson's original layout, are still available for purchase. The most recent publication was released by the Minnesota Historical Society Press in 1987, and includes a contemporary introduction by anthropologist and ethnobotanist Jeffery R. Hanson. Buffalo Bird Woman's Garden is also accessible for free on the University of Pennsylvania's Digital Library website.

Buffalo Bird Woman's Garden has largely fallen into obscurity. However, those who read the book praise its historicity and still-useful gardening accounts. Tom Woods laments in Minnesota History that Hanson does not provide any contextual reference with regard to the Hidatsa's agricultural practices compared to other tribes. However, the review is mostly positive. Woods praises the Minnesota Historical Society Press for "rescuing this book from the dusty shelves of obscurity."

A children's picture book, Buffalo Bird Girl: A Hidatsa Story was published in 2012. Written by S.D. Nelson, the book uses Wilson's dissertation to construct a fictionalized account of Waheenee's childhood.

== Books by Buffalo Bird Woman ==
- Buffalo Bird Woman. Buffalo Bird Woman's Garden: Agriculture of the Hidatsa Indians. St. Paul: Minnesota Historical Society Press, 1987. ISBN 978-0-87351-219-0.
- Buffalo Bird Woman. Waheenee, an Indian girl's story. Lincoln: University of Nebraska Press, 1991.
