= Galium matthewsii =

Bushy bedstraw

Scientific classification
- Kingdom: Plantae
- Clade: Tracheophytes
- Clade: Angiosperms
- Clade: Eudicots
- Clade: Asterids
- Order: Gentianales
- Family: Rubiaceae
- Genus: Galium
- Species: G. matthewsii

Binomial name
- Galium matthewsii Gray

Species of plant

Galium matthewsii is a species of flowering plant in the coffee family known by the common names bushy bedstraw and Matthews' bedstraw. It is native to the mountains and deserts of southeastern California (Kern, Inyo and San Bernardino Cos), and southern Nevada (Clark and Esmeralda Cos).

Galium matthewsii is a shrubby perennial growing from a woody base and reaching heights of about 20 to 30 centimeters. It forms short, thin, tangled masses. The small, sharp-pointed leaves grow in whorls of four about the stem at intervals. The plant is dioecious, but male and female flowers are similar in appearance and grow in clustered inflorescences of hairy yellow corollas. The fruit is a nutlet covered with very long, straight, white hairs.

The plant was named for Washington Matthews.
