= Gilbert Livingston Wilson =

American ethnographer (1868–1930)

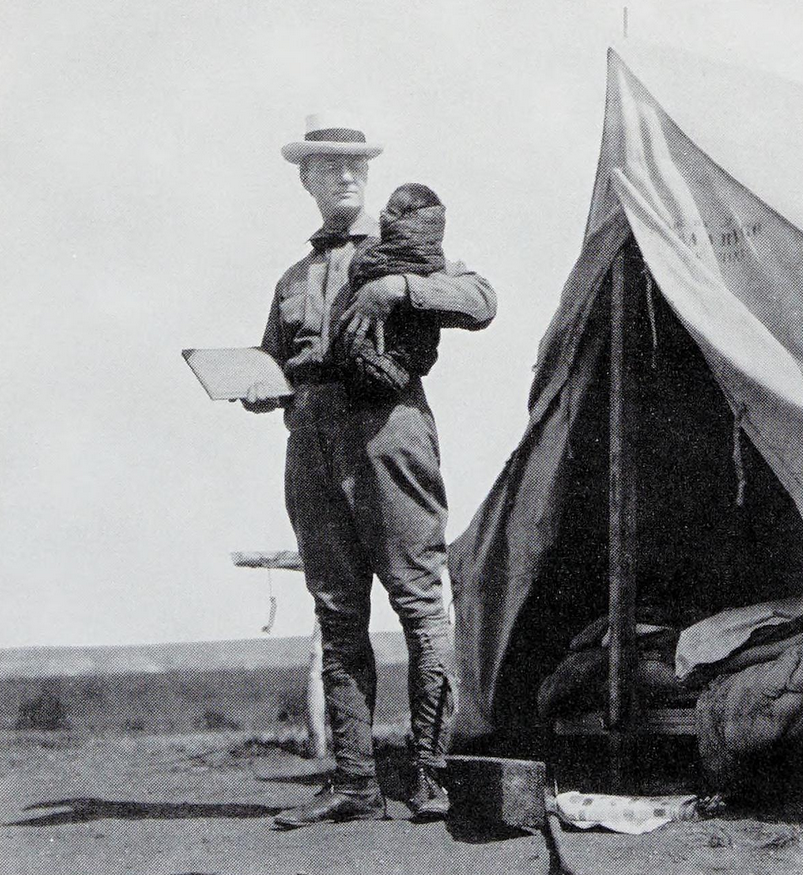
- Wilson in 1914
- Born: October 1868; Springfield, Ohio, U.S.
- Died: June 8, 1930 (aged 61); St. Paul, Minnesota, U.S.
- Education: University of Minnesota
- Occupations: Ethnographer; Presbyterian minister
- Employer: Macalester College
- Known for: Documenting the culture of the Hidatsa; one of the earliest practitioners of biographical anthropology with Native Americans
- Spouse: Ada Myers (m. 1909)
- Children: 1
- Relatives: Buffalo Bird Woman (adopted mother)

Gilbert Livingston Wilson (October 1868 – June 8, 1930) was an American ethnographer and a Presbyterian minister. He and his brother recorded the lives of three Hidatsa family members; Buffalo Bird Woman, her brother Henry Wolf Chief, and her son Edward Goodbird. Wilson's extensive and detailed writings remain an important source of information for historians and anthropologists, as well as the Hidatsa people.

== Early life and education ==
Gilbert Livingston Wilson was born in Springfield, Ohio, in 1868. He earned a bachelor's degree from Princeton Theological Seminary in 1899 after graduating from Wittenberg College, and was ordained a Presbyterian minister in Moorhead, Minnesota. He then returned to Wittenberg and earned a master's degree. In 1902, he became a pastor in Mandan, North Dakota. Wilson was excited to live near Native Americans, as he enjoyed studying Indian life and folklore, and aspired to write sympathetic children's books which accurately depicted Indian life and customs.

== Career ==
Wilson's career as an ethnographer began when he visited the Sioux at Standing Rock Reservation in 1905. Two books came out of this early work; The Iktomi Myth (1906) and Indian Hero Tales (1907). The next year, Gilbert and his brother Frederick visited the elderly Hidatsa woman, Buffalo Bird Woman, at Fort Berthold Indian Reservation in North Dakota. This began in earnest Wilson's careful documentation of Hidatsa life. In following years, he included other family members of Buffalo Bird Woman in his scholarship, most prominently her brother Henry Wolf Chief and her son Edward Goodbird. Wilson was also adopted into the Prairie Chicken Clan as a son to Buffalo Bird Woman and a brother to Edward in 1909.

Among the many published works (some posthumously) that came out of this relationship, were the ethnographic works Agriculture of the Hidatsa: An Indian Interpretation (1917), The Horse and Dog in Hidatsa Culture (1924), Hidatsa Eagle Trapping (1929), The Hidatsa Earthlodge (1934) and the children's books Myths of the Red Children (1907) and Indian Hero Tales (1916). He also published Buffalo-Bird-Woman's and Goodbird's autobiography in Waheene: an Indian Girl's Story, Told by Herself and Goodbird, the Indian.

Early in Wilson's work at Fort Berthold, he generated great controversy when he bought the Waterbuster clan medicine bundle from Wolf Chief, who converted to Christianity and was wary of shouldering the responsibility of bundle ownership. Wilson then sold the bundle to a wealthy New York collector, which angered many Hidatsa, especially those from the Waterbuster clan, as well as the curator of the State Historical Society of North Dakota who tried to bar Wilson from the reservation. However, Wilson's adopted family supported him and allowed him to continue his research.

As a student of Alfred Jenks, Wilson became a doctoral candidate in anthropology at the University of Minnesota in 1910. He received his degree in 1916 with his dissertation, Agriculture of the Hidatsa: An Indian Interpretation, This work is a classic of northern Plains ethnography, and is still used by scholars today to gain insights into traditional Hidatsa farming practices.

== Personal life ==
Wilson married Ada Myers of Springfield in 1909 and had one child, who died suddenly in early adulthood.

== Later life and death ==
Later in life, Wilson was both a pastor in Stillwater, Minnesota, as well as a professor of anthropology at Macalester College in Saint Paul, where he also served as pastor.

Wilson died on June 8, 1930, and his wife donated his works to the Minnesota Historical Society.

== Selected publications ==
- 1903 Little Ugly Boy and the Bear; and, The Rainbow Snake. Mandan, ND.
- 1904 Indian Legends. Woman's Home Companion 31: 47-48
- 1906 The Iktomi Myth. Collections of the State Historical Society of North Dakota 1: 474-475
- 1907 Myths of the Red Children. Illus. Frederick N. Wilson. Ginn & Co. Boston, MA.
- 1916 Indian Hero Tales. Illus. Frederick N. Wilson. American Book Co. New York, NY.
- 1917 Agriculture of the Hidatsa Indians: An Indian Interpretation. Studies in the Social Sciences, No. 9. University of Minnesota, Minneapolis, MN.
- 1924 The Horse and Dog in Hidatsa Culture. Anthropological Papers of the American Museum of Natural History 15: 125–311.
- 1926 Hidatsa Eagle Trapping. Anthropological Papers of the American Museum of Natural History 30: 99-245.
- 1934 The Hidatsa Earthlodge. Ed. Bella Weitzner. Anthropological Papers of the American Museum of Natural History 33: 341–420.
