= Big Hidatsa Village Site =

Archaeological site in North Dakota, United States

- U.S. National Register of Historic Places
- U.S. National Historic Landmark
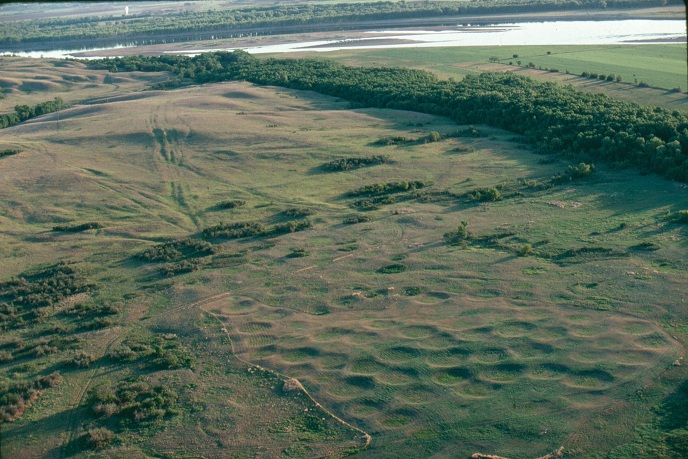
- Big Hidatsa Village

- Location within North Dakota Location within the United States
- Nearest city: Stanton, North Dakota
- Coordinates: 47°20′22″N 101°22′56″W
- Area: 15 acres (6.1 ha)
- NRHP reference No.: 66000600
- Added to NRHP: October 15, 1966

The Big Hidatsa site, occupied between ca. 1740 and 1850, is an earthlodge located in the 1,758 acre Knife River Indian Villages National Historic Site in North Dakota, United States. This National Historic Site was established in 1974 “to focus on the cultures and lifestyles of the Plains Indians”.

== Location ==
The Big Hidatsa site is located near the junction of the Knife and Missouri Rivers close to Stanton, North Dakota. This location was a stop on the expedition of Lewis and Clark. Big Hidatsa was the largest village of the three on the site, with about 120 round earthlodges. Fort Mandan was built about 2 miles away from Big Hidatsa by the Lewis and Clark expedition.

== History ==
The Big Hidatsa site and its neighbors are the villages at which Lewis and Clark and the Corps of Discovery were assisted by Sacagawea during their expedition. When the explorers arrived in winter 1804, between 4,000 and 5,000 Hidatsa and Mandan lived in this area, and there were more than 200 lodges. Each of these earthlodges could hold 20 to 30 people.

After Fort Mandan was erected by the Discovery Corps, trading was conducted between the men of the expedition and people of Big Hidatsa. In fact, some artifacts from the inhabitants of the nearby site and its neighbors were sent to President Thomas Jefferson. Communications with the Hidatsa and Mandan people here provided invaluable information about the culture and history of the people in the west.

== Today ==
Depressions in the ground can be seen where the lodges once stood because the dirt surrounding the structures collapsed after it was abandoned. Several invasive species, harmful tree fungus, and the erosion of the riverbank threaten the site. The park has a rich collection of artifacts from the people who lived at the site.

The Knife River Indian Villages National Historic Site is also a destination for canoeing and hiking. Canoeists who frequent the Knife or Missouri rivers can pass through the park.
