= Washington Matthews =

American ethnographer (1843–1905)

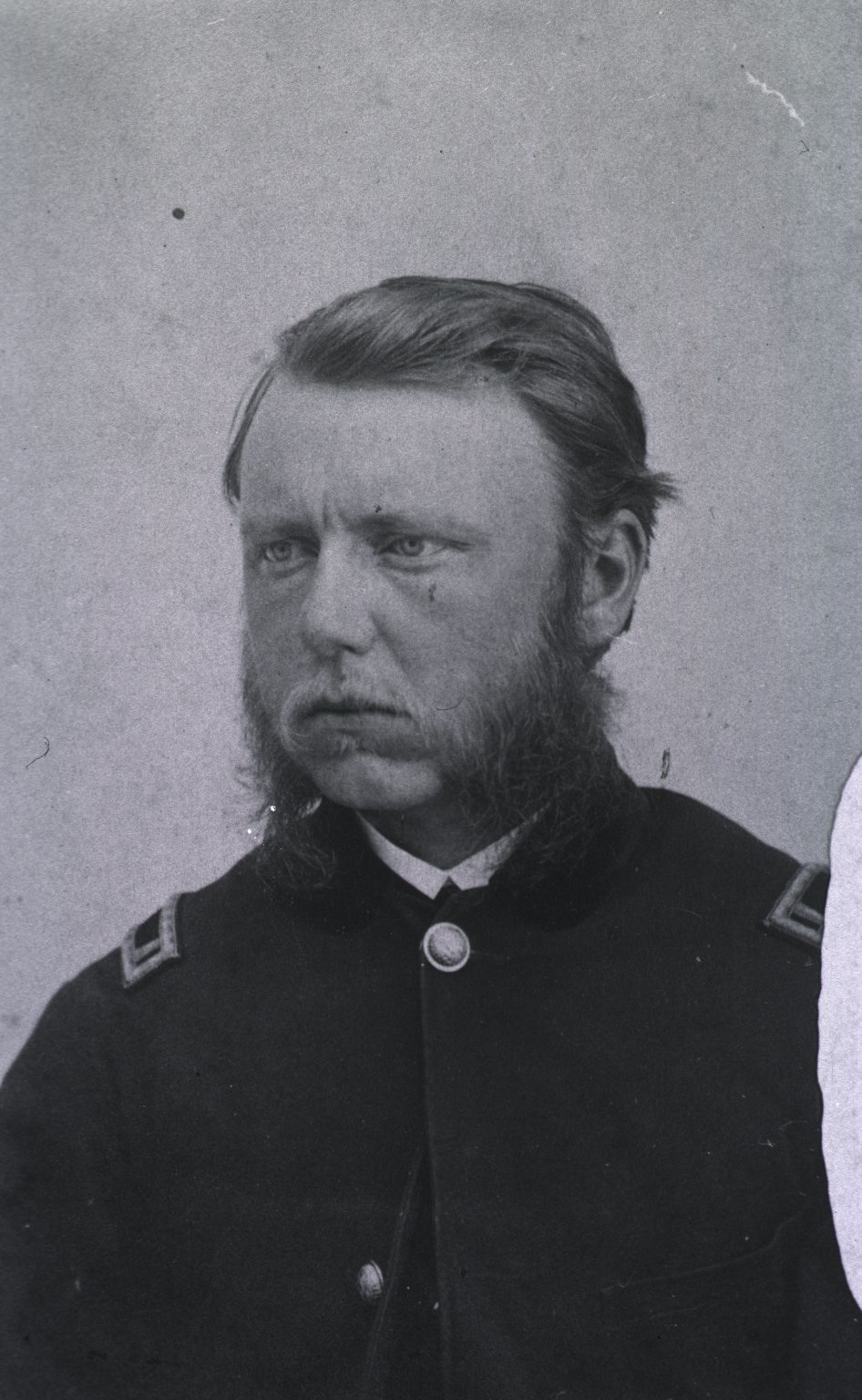
- Photo credit: National Library of Medicine
- Born: Washington Matthews; June 17, 1843; Killiney, Ireland
- Died: March 2, 1905 (aged 61); Washington, D.C.
- Education: University of Iowa
- Known for: Ethnography of the Native American peoples

Washington Matthews (June 17, 1843 – March 2, 1905) was an Irish-born American surgeon in the United States Army, ethnographer, and linguist known for his studies of Native American peoples, especially the Navajo.

== Early life and education ==
Matthews was born in Killiney, near Dublin, Ireland, in 1843 to Nicolas Blayney Matthews and Anna Burke Matthews. His mother having died a few years after his birth, his father took him and his brother to the United States. He grew up in Wisconsin and Iowa, and his father, a medical doctor, began training his son in medicine. He would go on to graduate from the University of Iowa in 1864 with a degree in medicine.

The American Civil War was raging at the time, and Matthews immediately volunteered for the Union Army upon graduating. His first post was as surgeon at Rock Island Barracks, Illinois, where he tended to Confederate prisoners.

== In the West ==
Matthews was posted at Fort Union in what is now Montana in 1865. It was there that an enduring interest in Native American peoples and languages took root. He would go on to serve at a series of forts in Dakota Territory until 1872: Fort Berthold, Fort Stevenson, Fort Rice, and Fort Buford. He was a part of General Alfred H. Terry's expedition in Dakota Territory in 1867.

While stationed at the Fort Berthold in the Dakota Territory, he learned to speak the Hidatsa language fluently, and wrote a series of works describing their culture and language: a description of Hidatsa-Mandan culture, including a grammar and vocabulary of the Hidatsa language and an ethnographic monograph of the Hidatsa. He also described, though less extensively, the nearby Mandan and Arikara peoples and languages. (Some of Matthews' work on the Mandan was lost in a fire before being published.)

There is some evidence that Matthews married a Hidatsa woman during this time. Her name is not known. There is also speculation and circumstantial evidence that Matthews had a son with the woman.

In April, 1876, Matthews was sent to Camp Independence to serve as Post Surgeon. In ensuing months he serviced soldiers and local civilians; he vaccinated hundreds of Native Americans of the Owens Valley against smallpox. During his stay in the Owens Valley he pursued other interests, such as collecting native plants. He sent his collection to Asa Gray, who named two of those new to science after him: Loeseliastrum matthewsii and Galium matthewsii. Camp Independence was closed in July, 1877.

In 1877 he participated in an expedition against the Nez Perce, and again in 1878 against the Bannock. While serving at a prison on Alcatraz Island in San Francisco Bay, Matthews made a study of the Modoc language.

== Army Medical Museum ==
From 1884 to 1890, Matthews was posted to the Army Medical Museum in Washington, DC. During this time he conducted research and wrote several papers on physical anthropology, specifically craniometry and anthropometry.

== With the Navajo ==
John Wesley Powell of the Smithsonian Institution's Bureau of American Ethnology suggested that Matthews be assigned to Fort Wingate, near what is now Gallup, New Mexico. It was there that Matthews came to know the people who would become the subject of his best known work, the Navajo. Matthews has been credited with carrying our this research with "unprecedented objectivity".

In 1887, Matthews published The Mountain Chant: A Navajo Ceremony which has been described as "probably the first full account of a Native American ceremony ever published". He was also said to have been initiated into various secret Navajo rituals. He also used wax cylinders to record ceremonial prayers and songs.

Matthews also published a number of other books on his research amongst the Navajo, including Navaho Legends (1897) and Navaho Myths, Prayers and Songs (1907).

In his work he reported that the Navajo were ichthyphobic, having a taboo on eating fish. He theorized that "Living in a desert land where water is so scarce and so obviously important to life, [coming to regard] water as sacred, it is an easy step for them to regard as sacred everything that belongs to the water…. Hence it becomes a sacrilege to kill the fish or eat its flesh."

Matthews work on the Navajo served to dispel then-current erroneous thinking about the complexity of Navajo culture. In an account of Matthews's Presidential Address to the American Folklore Society in 1895 ("which was titled "The Poetry and Music of the Navahoes"), The Critic magazine wrote:

Dr Matthews referred to Dr Leatherman's account of the Navahoes as the one long accepted as authoritative. In it that writer has declared that they have no traditions nor poetry, and that their songs "were but a succession of grunts". Dr. Matthews discovered that they had a multitude of legends, so numerous that he never hoped to collect them all: an elaborate religion, with symbolism and allegory, which might vie with that of the Greeks; numerous and formulated prayers and songs, not only multitudinous, but relating to all subjects, and composed for every circumstance of life. The songs are as full of poetic images and figures of speech as occur in English, and are handed down from father to son, from generation to generation.

Matthews has been credited for treating "Navajo medicine men as colleagues" and seeing his informants as individuals rather than "just sources of data". However, he has been criticised for the then common practice of not crediting his informants in his published works. However, his research has been credited with creating through "careful and thorough fieldwork ... a monumental bequest for future generations of the Navajo people and scholars".

== Recognition ==
In 1895 Matthews served as president of the American Folklore Society. He was a member of a number of other societies such as the American Anthropological Association, the National Geographic Society and the American Association for the Advancement of Science.

== Medical research and retirement ==
Matthews was quoted by Charles Darwin in The Expression of the Emotions in Man and Animals (1872); Matthews is cited with respect to the expression of emotion and other gestures among various peoples of America: the Dakota, Tetons, Hidatsa, Mandan, and Assiniboine.

Matthews was retired from the Army in 1895. He was buried at Arlington National Cemetery, in Arlington, Virginia.

== Papers ==
Matthews's papers were initially left to the University of California at Berkeley. In 1951 they were transferred to the then Museum of Navajo Ceremonial Art, now Wheelwright Museum of the American Indian. In 1985, a microfilm guide to these papers was published.

== Selected works ==
- Matthews, Washington (1873). Grammar and Dictionary of the Language of the Hidatsa. New York: Cramoisy Press. ISBN 978-0-404-15787-6.
- Matthews, Washington (1877). Ethnography and philology of the Hidatsa Indians. United States Government Printing Office. ISBN 0-665-55834-1.
- Matthews, Washington (1887). The Mountain Chant: A Navajo Ceremony. [Washington.
- Matthews, Washington (1994) [First published 1897]. Navaho legends. Salt Lake City: University of Utah Press. ISBN 0-87480-424-8.
- Matthews, Washington (1907). Navaho Myths, Prayers and Songs.
