= Hidatsa language =

Siouan language of North and South Dakota

Hidatsa
- hiraaciré’
- Native to: United States
- Region: North Dakota, Montana, South Dakota
- Ethnicity: Hidatsa
- Native speakers: c. 65 (2026)
- Language family: Siouan-Catawban: Siouan; Missouri River Siouan; Hidatsa

Language codes
- ISO 639-3: hid
- Glottolog: hida1246
- ELP: Hidatsa
- Linguasphere: 64-AAA-a
- Hidatsa is classified as Definitely Endangered by the UNESCO Atlas of the World's Languages in Danger.

Hidatsa (/hɪˈdɑːtsə/ hih-DAHT-sə) is an endangered Siouan language that is related to the Crow language. It is spoken by the Hidatsa tribe, primarily in North Dakota and South Dakota.

A description of Hidatsa-Mandan culture, including a grammar and vocabulary of the language, was published in 1877 by Washington Matthews, a government physician who lived among the Hidatsa at the Fort Berthold Indian Reservation.

More recently, the language has been the subject of work in the generative grammar tradition.

In 2019, it was estimated that there were fewer than 65 fluent speakers of the language.

== Sacagawea ==
Linguists working on Hidatsa since the 1870s have considered the name of Sacagawea, a guide and interpreter on the Lewis and Clark Expedition, to be of Hidatsa origin. The name is a compound of two common Hidatsa nouns, cagáàga [tsaɡáàɡa] 'bird' and míà [míà] 'woman'. The compound is written as Cagáàgawia 'Bird Woman' in modern Hidatsa orthography and pronounced [tsaɡáàɡawia] (/m/ is pronounced [w] between vowels in Hidatsa). The double /aa/ in the name indicates a long vowel and the diacritics a falling pitch pattern. Hidatsa is a pitch-accent language that does not have stress so all syllables in [tsaɡáàɡawia] are pronounced with roughly the same relative emphasis. However, most English speakers perceive the accented syllable (the long áà/) as stressed. In faithful rendering of the name Cagáàgawia to other languages, it is advisable to emphasize the second, long syllable, not the /i/ vowel, as is common in English.

== Phonology ==
External videos
- Two children's books read in Hidatsa
- The Buffalo and The Boat: Midéegaadish híi Máadiraxbi
- Prairie Dog Goes to School: Cíhba Maaʔágashiʔadi Néec

=== Stress ===
Primary stress in Hidatsa is predictable and occurs on the first quantity sensitive iamb of the word. Initial heavy syllables result in stress on the first syllable, while initial light syllables result in stress on the second syllable. The vowels of stressed syllables are significantly louder than those of surrounding syllables and of their unstressed counterparts.

=== Vowels ===
	Short		Long	
	Front	Back	Front	Back
High (close)	i	u	iː	uː
Mid			eː	oː
Low (open)	a		aː	
Diphthong			ia	ua

Hidatsa has five vowels and two diphthongs. It lacks nasal vowels, which is a way it differs from other Siouan languages. (Boyle 2007) The /a/ vowel has three sounds. The long 'a:' sounds like the 'a' in the English word, 'father'; 'ǎ' has the sound of the 'a' in the English word 'what'; and an obscure sound, 'ạ', which represents the short 'u' sound in English, like in the word 'fun'.

The /e/ vowel also has three sounds. Unmarked 'e' has the English sound 'ai', like the initial syllable in the word 'air'; 'ě' has the short English 'e' sound [ɛ], such as in the word 'den'; 'e:' has the sound of the English long 'e' [e], like the sound of the 'e' in 'they'.

The /i/ vowel has only two sounds. The 'ǐ' in Hidatsa sounds like the short 'i' sound in English, like in the word 'pin'; the long 'i:' sounds like the English 'i' in the word 'marine'. The /o/ and /u/ vowels have one sound each, the 'o' in the English word 'bone' and the 'u' in the English word 'tune', respectively. The /e/ and /o/ vowels are rare and appear as long sounds. Length, as demonstrated in the table above, is phonemically distinct. There is evidence of this within some minimal and near-minimal pairs in the language:

(1) e/e
[gáre] /káre/ 'to stick into'
[garée] /karé:/ 'to vomit'

(2) a/a
[miŕa] /wiŕa/ 'wood'
[miíraa] /wiíra:/ 'goose'

(3) i/i
[máashii] /wáaši:/ 'holy story'
[máashi] /wáaši/ 'to buy, to hire'

=== Consonants ===
Hidatsa has ten consonant phonemes:

	Labial	Alveolar	Palatal	Velar	Glottal
Plosive	p	t		k	(ʔ)
Affricate		t͡s ⟨c⟩			
Fricative			ʃ ⟨sh⟩	x	
Sonorant	w ~ [m]	r ~ [n]			h

Unlike the Mississippi Valley Siouan languages, Hidatsa does not have the glottalized or the aspirated stops of Proto-Siouan-Catawban. It has only one series of voiceless oral stop, /p,t,k/, which are voiced intervocalically as [b,d,g]. Hidatsa has one voiceless affricate, /t͡s/. The two fricatives, /ʃ/ and /x/, are voiceless when they are unaspirated. They are not voiced intervocalically.

Hidatsa has three sonorants: two glides, /w/ and /r/, as well as /h/. The glides are realized as [m] and [ŋ] after a pause, most frequently at the beginning of a word.

== Morphology ==
=== Gender ===
In Hidatsa, the usage of different words creates a division between masculine and feminine. Words may stand alone or be added to common gender words.

Nouns of the masculine gender: matsé ('man'), ṡikàka ('young man'), itàka ('old man'), the terms used for male relations (itsùka, idìṡi, etc.) and their compounds (such as makadiṡta-maste and itakaḣe) are the masculine nouns for humans. The word kedapi by itself means "bull" but designates the maleness of any of the lower animals in its suffix form, with or without the interposition of the adverb adu.

Nouns of the feminine gender: mia ('woman'), kaduḣe ('old woman'), the terms used for female relations (idu, itakiṡa, etc.) and their compounds (such as miakaza, meaning "a young woman") are feminine nouns for humans. The word mika, meaning" a mare," the designation for females of the lower animals, with or without the interposition of adu.

=== Number ===
Hidatsa nouns do not change forms to mark the difference between singular and plural. Some nouns are known to be singular or plural from only the original meaning of the word or how they are used in a sentence. In other cases, numeral adjectives or adjectives such as ahu ('many'), etsa ('all') and kauṡta ('few') are the only indications at discerning number.

=== Person ===
There are five simple pronouns: ma and mi, sometimes contracted to m, refer to the first person; da and di, sometimes contracted to d, to the second person; and i to the third person. They are normally incorporated into other words but can stand out for repetition or emphasis.

Both ma and da are the proper nominative forms, used as the nominatives of transitive verbs, but they may also be used as the nominative of certain intransitive verbs in an active sense, such as amaki ("he sits") and adamaki ("you sit"). They may also be prefixed, suffixed, or inserted into verbs, such as kikidi ("he hunts"), dakikidi ("you hunt"), and amakakạṡi ("I write").

Ma ("my") is used in the possessive case and is prefixed to the noun to indicate the possessed, in 'intimate or nontransferable' possession; examples include words such as maṡạki ("my hand"), from the original word saki ("hand").

=== Modality ===
There are three modes in Hidatsa: infinitive, indicative, and imperative. They are shown in the conjugations of verbs.

The infinitive is the same as the third person indicative, which is the simple form of the verb. However, finite verbs are much more commonly used in speech. For example, "I try to cough" would be produced as mahua mamahets ("I cough, I try") rather than as hua mamahets ("to cough, I try)"). In the third person, no distinction is made between the infinitive and the indicative modes.

The simple form of the verb is the third person indicative; it is modified by incorporated pronouns for the first and the second persons.

The imperative mode has five forms. The first form uses the same form as the second person indicative, which uses verbs that have incorporated pronouns suffixed. The second is made by final 'i' or 'e' of the infinitive to 'a' or using an infinitive ending in a or u. The third is formed by dropping the final 'i' of verbs ending in 'ki' and sometimes of those ending in 'ti'. The fourth form adds the auxiliary 'da' to the second form of the imperative, usually placed after the verb. The fifth form is made by adding 'diha' instead of 'da'. The fourth and the fifth forms are used when immediate compliance with the order is desired.

=== Time ===
In Hidatsa, there are two distinct conjugations of verbs related to time: one for the indefinite and one for future time. The indefinite tense is shown by the simple form of the verb, with or without the incorporated pronouns, and it is used for both past and present time.

In the future tense, indicative mode, 'mi' and 'miha' are added to the indefinite for the first person, 'di' and 'diha' for the second person. In the third person, the form is the same as in the indefinite.

=== Place ===
Most adverbs of place are formed from nouns by adding the suffixes 'du', 'ha', 'ka', 'koa', and 'ta', these correspond to prepositions in English. Some examples include dumàta ("the middle"), dumàtadu ("through the middle"), dumàtaka ("the middle"), dumàtakoa ("at the middle"), and dumàtata ("facing in the direction of the middle"). Words formed so are used in the same way as the English adverbs 'windward' and 'forward'.

=== Word order ===
In Hidatsa, word order is subject-object-verb.

=== Unconjugated verbs ===
Since there is no copula in Hidatsa, all adjectives, adverbs, and nouns that are used as predicates of nouns are regarded as intransitive verbs. They do not undergo a change of form to denote different modes and tenses. They may take the incorporated pronouns 'mi' and 'di' for their nominatives, which are prefixed. Verbs beginning with consonants are usually prefixed in full: liié ("old, to be old") and liie ("he, she, or it is or was old" or "you are or were old"). Before verbs beginning with vowels, the pronouns are often contracted.

Transitive verbs used in the third person or impersonally in a passive sense, with pronouns in the objective case prefixed, also look like unconjugated intransitive verbs.

=== Case ===
Hidatsa nouns are not inflected to indicate case except (arguably) in the possessive. Possession is shown by the use of possessive pronouns, which are before the noun that is possessed. They are considered to be prefixed to it. Two kinds of possessions are indicated in Hidatsa: intimate (or non-transferable) possession, such as parts of the body, relationships, and anything else that cannot be relinquished; examples are the words idakoa ("his friend or comrade") and iko'pa ("her friend or comrade"). Initimate possession is shown by the simple possessive pronouns i, di, and ma as well as the contractions m and d: ạki ("hand") can turn into iṡạki ("his or her hand") 'diṡạki ("your hand"), and maṡạki ("my hand").

The other type, acquired possession, indicates transferable possession, anything that can be given to another. It is shown by compound possessive pronouns ita, dita, and mata. They are all formed by adding '-ta' to the simple pronouns: midaki ("a shield"), itamidaki, ("his shield"), ditamidaki, ("your shield"), matamidaki, ("my shield").

The position of a word in a sentence and the conjugation of the verb that follows usually show whether it is in the nominative or the objective case. Often, it is unmistakable in context.

== Use ==
By the Graded Intergenerational Disruption Scale, originally proposed by linguist Joshua Fishman in 1991, the status of the language is at level 7, or 'Shifting': "The child-bearing generation can use the language among themselves, but it is not being transmitted to children."

Research by linguist Victor Golla in 2007 found that out of an ethnic population of 600, only 200 people are able to speak Hidatsa. There are 6 monolingual speakers, and only 50 speak the language semi-fluently; the most proficient speakers are ages 30 and older, and children are familiar with the language only in passing. Conversations in Hidatsa primarily take place between elders in the privacy of the home. Revitalization is still possible since a good number of speakers are of child-bearing age, but emphasis on Hidatsa-language education must be stressed while that is still the case.
