= Hidatsa =

Native American tribe in North Dakota

Hiraacá
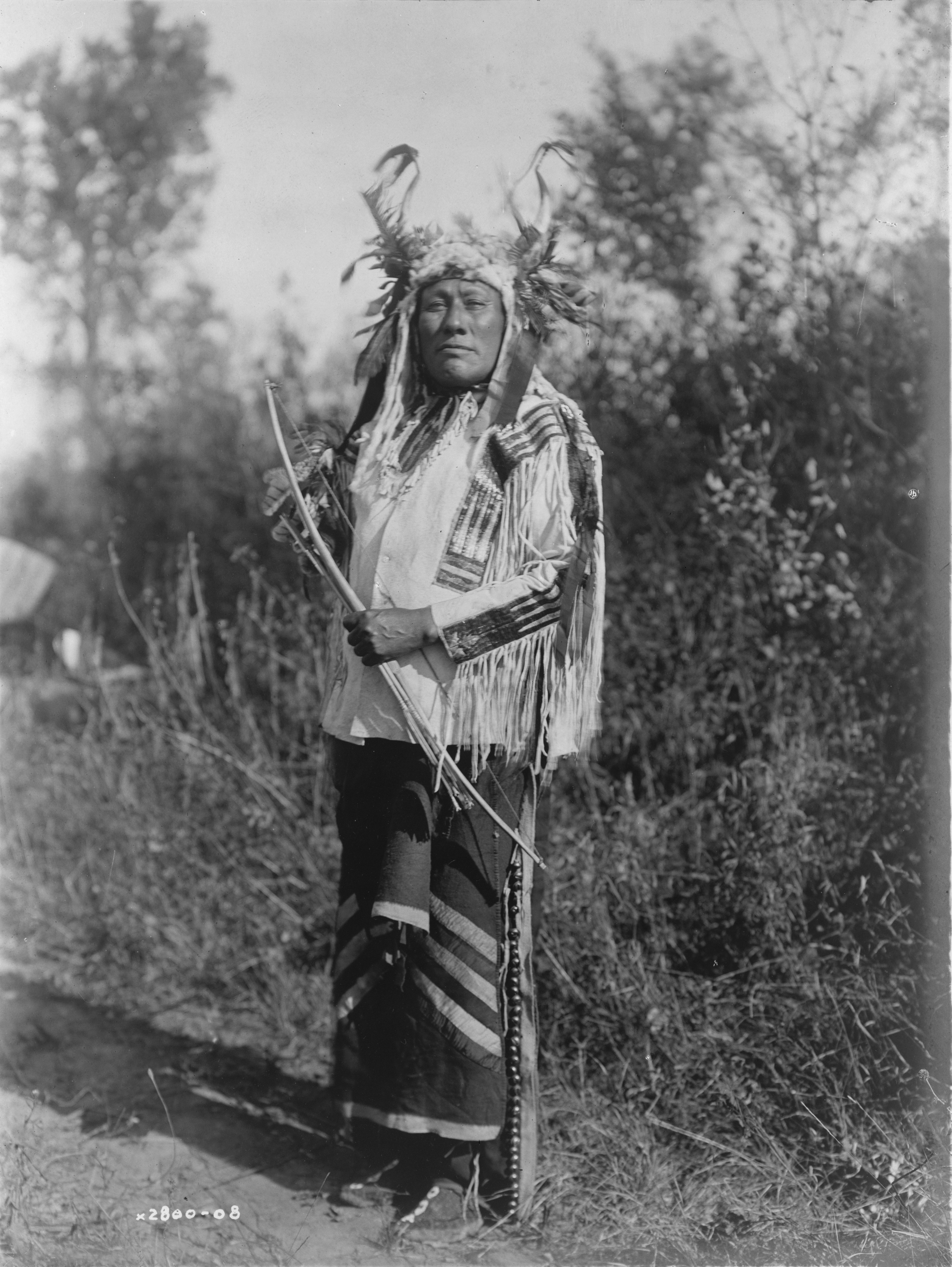
- Long Time Dog, a Hidatsa warrior

Total population
- 811 (2020 census), 17,648 enrolled citizens of the Three Affiliated Tribes of the Fort Berthold Reservation (2020)

Regions with significant populations
- North Dakota

Languages
- Hidatsa language, English

Religion
- Indigenous religion, Naxpike, Christianity

Related ethnic groups
- Apsáalooke, Mandan

The Hidatsa (/hɪˈdɑːtsə/ hih-DOT-sə) are a Missouri River Siouan people. They are enrolled in the federally recognized Three Affiliated Tribes of the Fort Berthold Reservation in North Dakota. Their language is related to that of the Apsáalooke, and they are sometimes considered a parent tribe of the Apsáalooke in Montana.

== Name ==
The Hidatsa's autonym is Hiraacá. The word itself is a corruption of the term midah-hutsee-ahti meaning 'house or lodge made with willows'. The present name Hidatsa was formerly borne by one of the three tribal villages. When the villages consolidated, the name was adopted for the tribe as a whole.

They are called the Mį́nįtaree ('to cross the water') by their allies, the Mandan; in Assiniboine, the Assiniboine (called Hidusidi by the Hidatsa) know them as: wakmúhaza yúde, ȟewáktųkta

Occasionally they have also been confused with the Gros Ventres in present-day Montana and Prairie Provinces of Canada, which were part of the Arapahoan languages speaking peoples. The nomadic Gros Ventre were called Minnetarees of Fort de Prairie, Minnetarees of the Prairie, Minnetarees of the Plains or Gros Ventres of the Prairie while the semisedentary Hidatsa were known as Minnetarees of the Missouri or Gros Ventres of the Missouri.

== History ==
=== Until 1850 ===
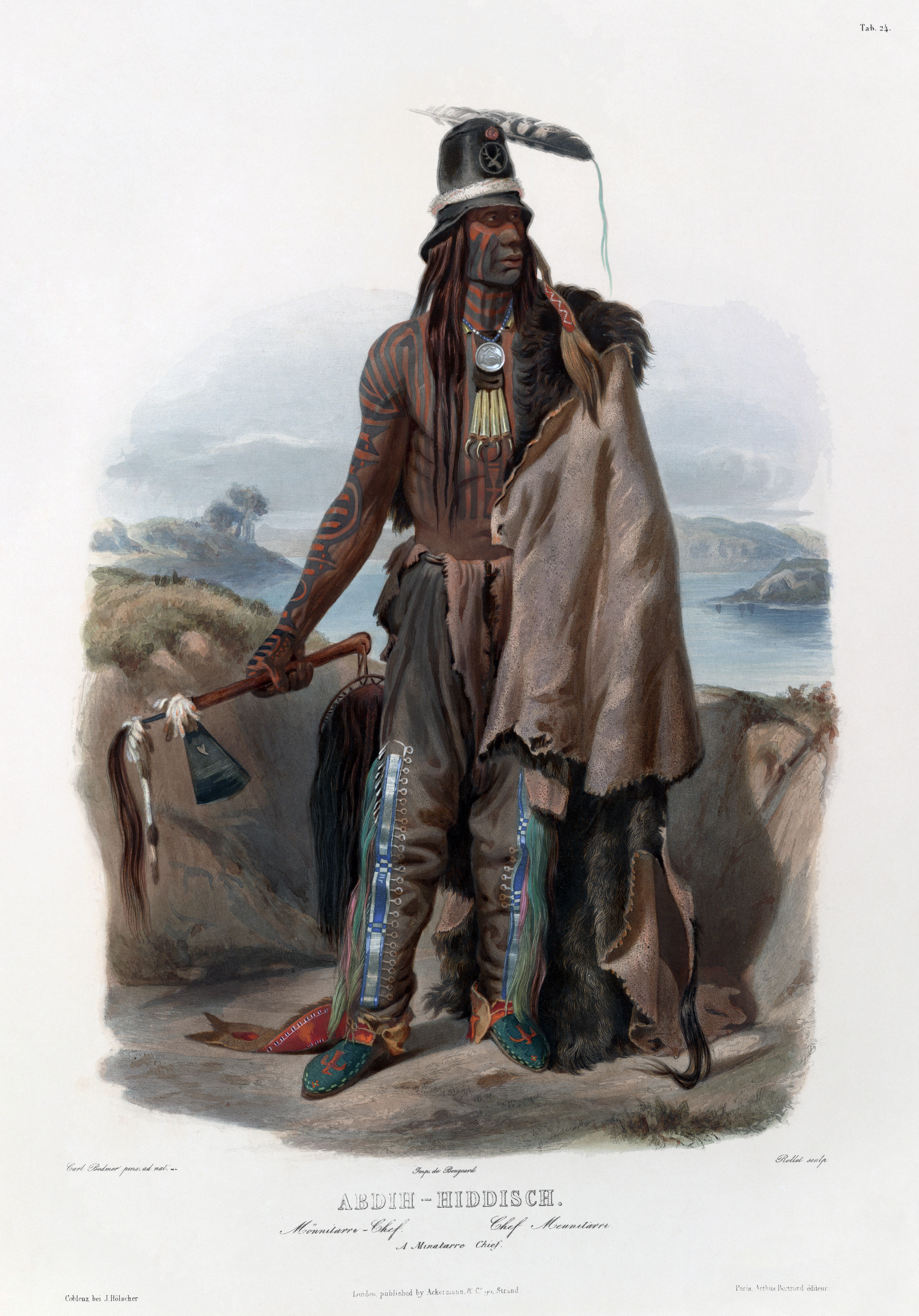
Road Maker (Aríìhiriš), a 19th-century Hidatsa chief. Engraving after a watercolour by Karl Bodmer.

For hundreds of years the Knife River area in present North Dakota was the home of the Hidatsa and their ancestors. The first villages date back to the 13th century.

Accounts of recorded history in the early 18th century identify three closely related village groups to which the term Hidatsa is applied. What is now known as the Hidatsa tribe is the amalgamation of these three groups, which had discrete histories and spoke different dialects; they came together only after settling on the Missouri River (Awati /Awáati).

The Awaxawi ("Village on the Hill") or Amahami ("Broken Land", "Mountainous Country") have a creation tradition similar to that of the Mandan, which describes their emergence long ago from the Earth, at Devils Lake (Miri xopash / Mirixubáash / Miniwakan) ("Holy Water there"). Later they moved westward to the Painted Woods (near Square Buttes or Awakotchkesshesh) and settled near a village of Mandan and another of Awatixa.

The Awatixa ("Village of the Scattered Lodges") or Awadixá (″High Village″) originated not from the earth, but from the sky, led by Charred Body. According to their tradition, their first people lived near Painted Woods, "where they were created." After that they always lived between the Heart River (Naada Aashi / Naadáashishh) and Knife River (Mee ecci Aashi / Mé'cii'aashish) along the Middle Missouri River (Awati / Awáati).

The Hidatsa proper or Hiraacá / Hiratsa ("People of the Willows"), largest of the three, were a confederation of numerous nomadic Hidatsa bands from the north, who separated from the Awaxawi/Amahami in what is now western Minnesota. First they settled to the north, then later moved south to Devil's Lake. In their travels they met the Mandan (Adahpakoa / Aróxbagua) (sometimes also called: Araxbakua Itawatish) and then moved westward and settled with these distant relatives north of the Knife River, where they adopted agriculture and permanent villages. Later they moved to the mouth of Knife River. Their territory ranged upstream along the Missouri River, its tributary regions to the west, and the Mouse River and Devils Lake regions to the northeast. They were initially part of those who would become the River Crow. The Hidatsa called the Crow Nation Gixaa'iccá / Gixáa-iccá ("Those Who Pout Over Tripe").

The Hidatsa originally lived in Miri xopash / Mirixubáash / Miniwakan, the Devils Lake region of North Dakota, before being pushed southwestward by the Lakota (Itahatski / Idaahácgi). As they migrated west, the Hidatsa came across the Mandan at the mouth of the Heart River. The two groups formed an alliance, and settled into an amiable division of territory along the area's rivers.

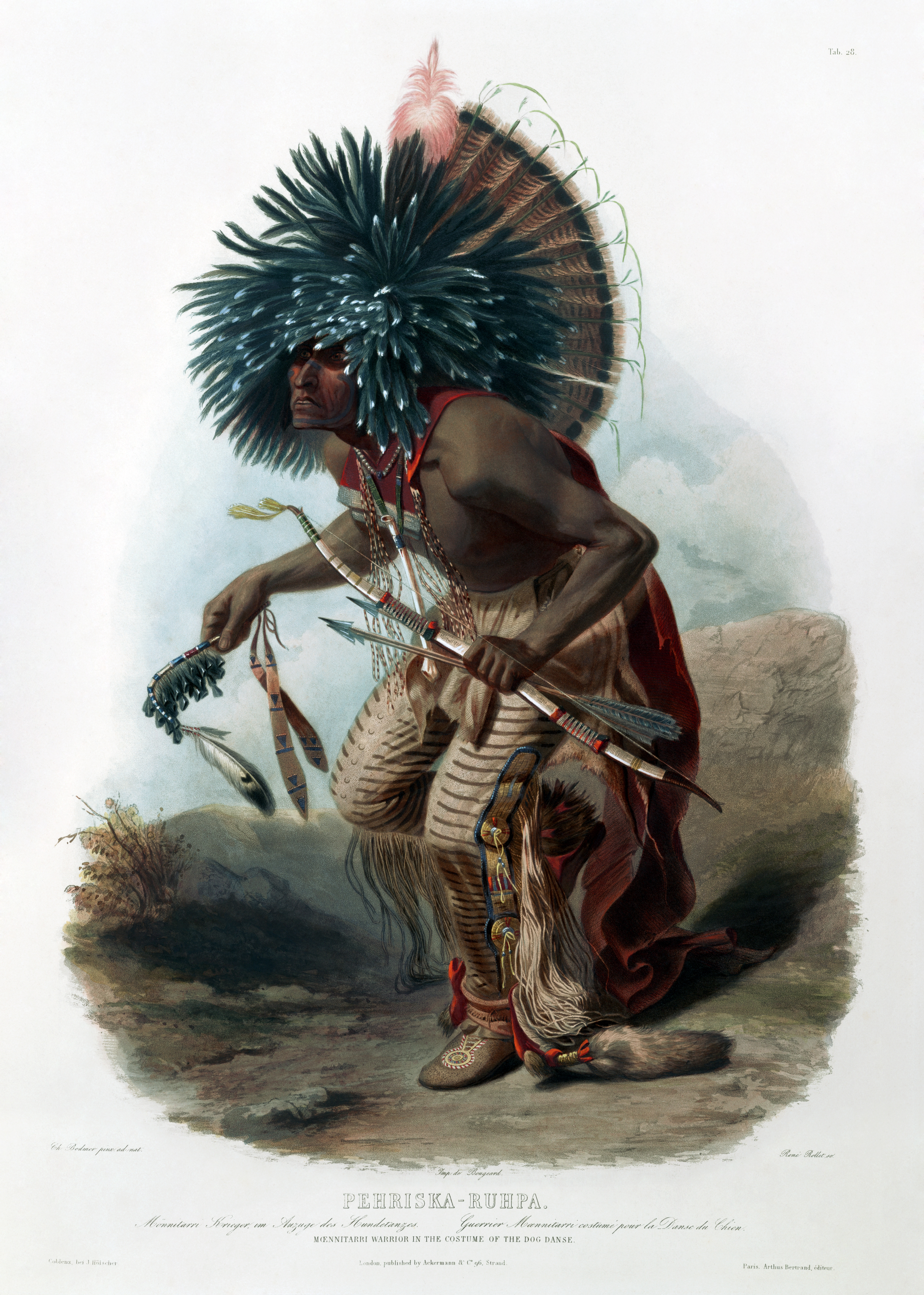
Hidatsa performing dog dance, portrait by Karl Bodmer. In his right hand, he holds a rattle of pronghorn hoofs. A bone flute is hanging in a string around his neck.

Prior to the epidemic of 1782, they had few enemies. The Hidatsa hunted upstream from the earthlodge villages at and below the Knife River. Here, between the Knife and Yellowstone River (Mii Ciiri Aashi /Mi'cíiriaashish), they were numerous enough to withstand attacks of the Assiniboine (Hidusidi / Hirushíiri), who hunted in the area but rarely wintered on the Missouri River, as part of the mighty Iron Confederacy (which was dominated by the Cree (Sahe / Shahíi) and Assiniboine) they were an opponent the Hidatsa had to pay attention to.

A remarkable siege of the village Big Hidatsa by the Sioux around 1790 ended with a major victory for the inhabitants. They killed 100 or more retreating Sioux in a counterattack, according to the sources.

Around 1795, John Tanner was present among the Mandan when they attempted to organize a concerted war against the Hidatsa, with allies from as far away as the Great Lakes, including Tanner's adopted Odawa family from Michigan. However, the attack fell apart in its planning stages.

The Hidatsa played a central role in the Great Plains Indian trading networks based on an advantageous geographical position combined with a surplus from agriculture and craft. Historical sources show that the Hidatsa villages were visited by Cree, Assiniboine, Crow, Cheyenne, Arapaho, Kiowa, Plains Apache and Comanche. White traders from the north, like North West Company man David Thompson, began to visit the Hidatsa and Mandan villages during the 1790s.

In 1800, a group of Hidatsa abducted Sacagawea and several other girls in a battle that resulted in death among the Shoshone (Maabúgsharuxbaaga) ("Snake People") of four men, four women and several boys. She was taken as a captive to a Hidatsa village near present-day Washburn, North Dakota.

In 1804, Lewis and Clark came to the Hidatsa (they referred to them as the Minnetaree in their records) in three villages at the mouth of the Knife River, and the Mandan in two villages a few miles lower down on the Missouri River.

In July 1825, the "Grovonters [Hidatsas] came into council & treaties of peace & Trade & friendship were concluded" with the United States. The tribe – in the document called "Belantse-Etoa or Minitaree" – also recognized the supremacy of the United States, whether it understood it or not. The peace treaty was never broken. "We have always been friends to the whites", emphasized Wolf Chief in 1888, and it never came to fights with the United States Army.

Hidatsa, Lean Wolf.

Tribal appearance and customs have been documented by the visits of two artists of the American west. The allied tribes were first visited by American George Catlin, who remained with them several months in 1832. He was followed by Karl Bodmer, a Swiss painter accompanying German explorer Maximilian of Wied-Neuwied on a Missouri River expedition from 1832 to 1834. Catlin and Bodmer's works record the Hidatsa and Mandan societies, where were rapidly changing under pressure from encroaching settlers, infectious disease, and government restraints.

In the spring of 1834, the Awaxawi and Awatixa settled in Big Hidatsa by necessity. The Sioux had attacked the Hidatsa villages and reduced "the two lower ones to ashes". Both before and after the smallpox epidemic in 1837, bloody fights took place between the Hidatsa and foes like the Assiniboine and the Yanktonai Sioux. Each tribe gave and took.

The smallpox epidemic of 1837–1838 reduced the Hidatsa to about 500 people. The remaining Mandan and Hidatsa united, and moved farther up the Missouri in 1845. "Bands of Sioux waylaid hunting parties or came prowling around our villages to steal horses", explained Buffalo Bird Woman the reason for leaving their native land through centuries along Knife River. They eventually settled at Like-a-Fishhook Village (Mua iruckup hehisa atis, Mu'a-idu'skupe-hi'cec) near Fort Berthold, a trading post. They were joined there by the Arikara (Adakadaho / Aragárahu) in 1862.

=== 1851–1900 ===
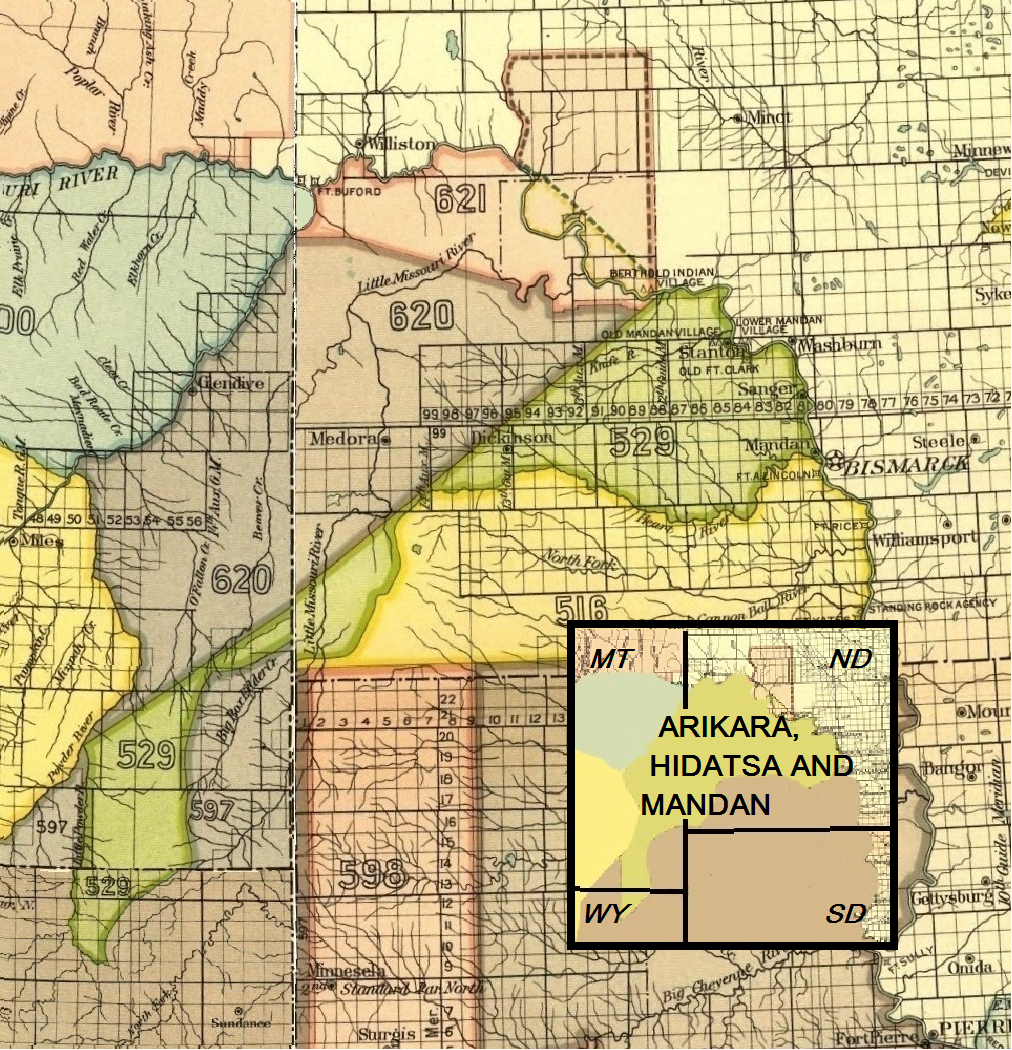
Arikara, Hidatsa and Mandan 1851 treaty territory. (Area 529, 620 and 621 south of the Missouri)

The Hidatsa tribe was one party in the Treaty of Fort Laramie, 1851. Along with the Mandan and the Arikara, they got a treaty on land north of Heart River. Eleven years later, the Three Tribes would not inhabit a single summer village in the treaty area. The Lakota had more or less annexed it, although a participant in the peace treaty.

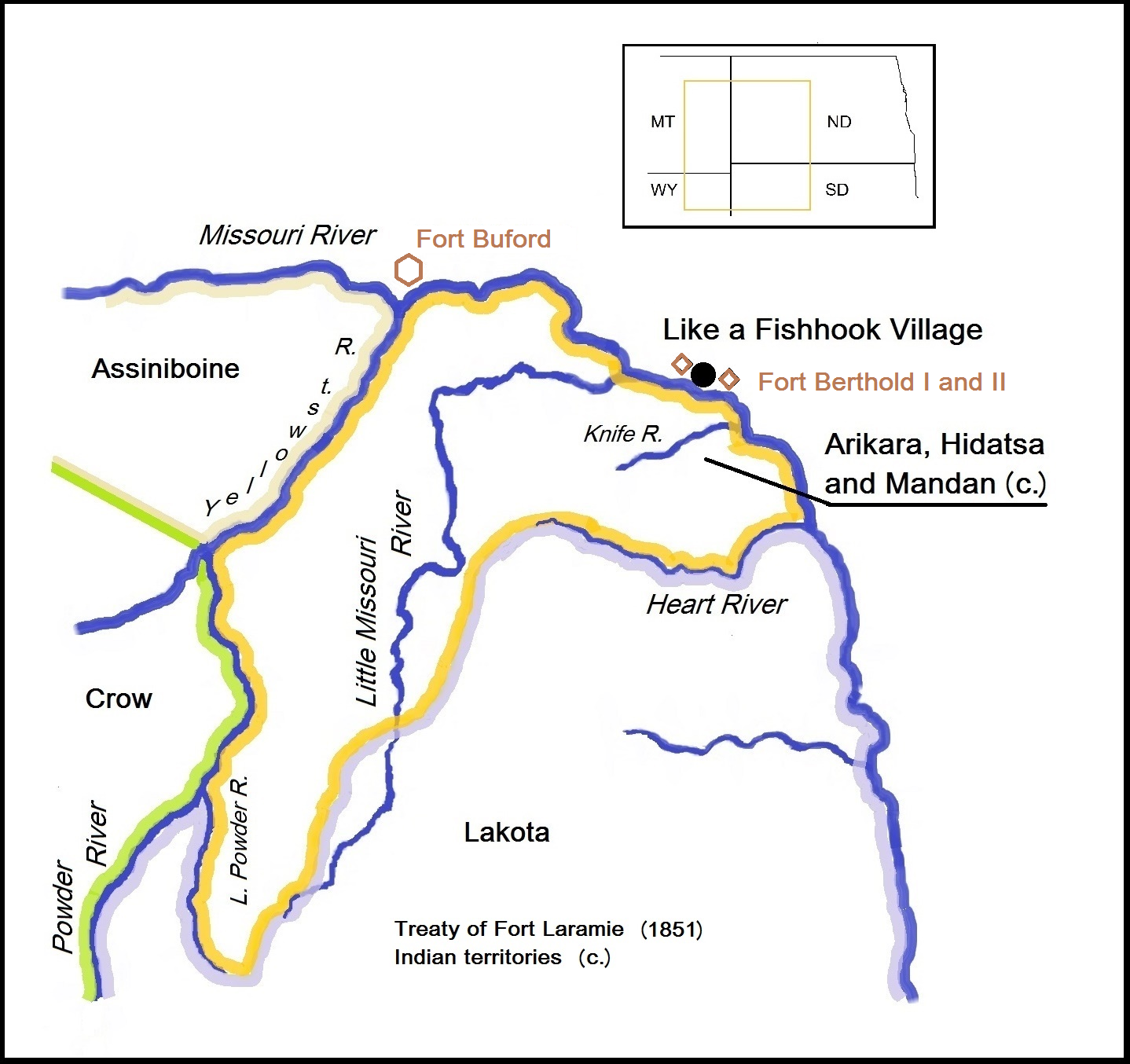
Arikara, Hidatsa and Mandan Indian territory, 1851. Like-a-Fishhook Village, Fort Berthold I and II and military post Fort Buford, North Dakota.

Encouraged by Karl Bodmer, Swiss artist Rudolph F. Kurz traveled the Northern Plains in the early 1850s. He left an account as well as sketches of the village tribes.

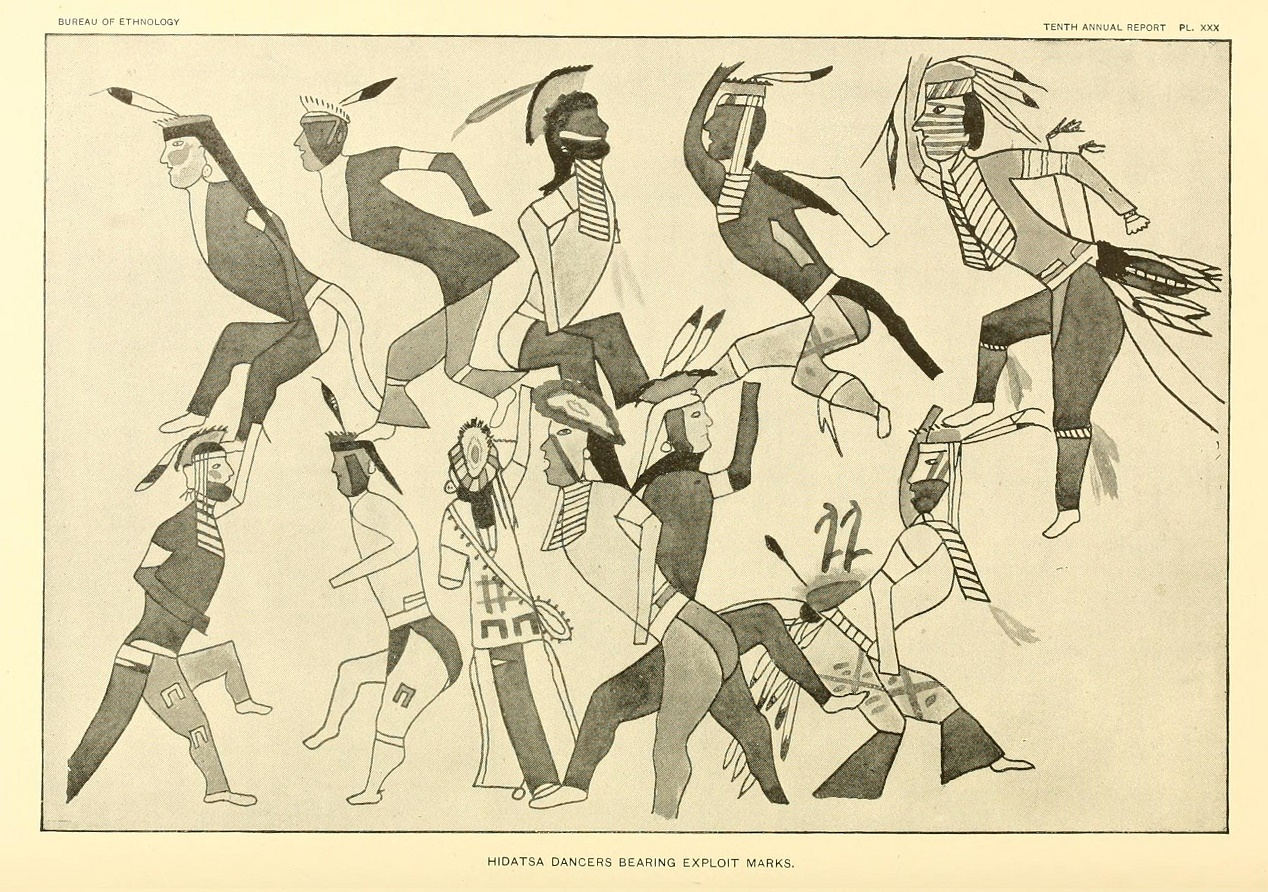
Celebrating Hidatsa warriors with exploit marks on body and dress. "X" designates a coup and "U" turned upside down designates captured horses. Drawn by a Hidatsa in the late 19th century.

Four Bears, outstanding Hidatsa war chief after the smallpox epidemic of 1837, (was one of the people who started Like-A-Fishhook Village for the Hidatsa, Mandan, and Arikara – and is not to be mistaken with the famous Mandan chief Mato-tope (Four Bears)), was killed along with other villagers by attacking Yankton Sioux in 1861. In December 1862, some Sioux burned parts of Like a Fishhook Village and they may have lifted cached corn at the same time.

Attacks made on their homes like this made the Three Tribes call for the United States Army to intervene. Already in 1857, the Hidatsa chief Long Hair had accused the Sioux of trying to be "the strongest and most powerful people on the Earth". Years later it would be chief Crows Breast's turn to raise hard-worded complaints about the Sioux.

The Hidatsas were not idle themselves, at times even raiding Lakotas south of Heart River.

Around 1870 a band of "dissident" Hidatsas led by Bobtail Bull and later Crow Flies High left the orthodox or conservative group in Like a Fishhook Village. For protection, they build a new village just two miles west of the military post Fort Buford. At times the men scouted for the Army. By keeping a low profile while hunting deer and other small game along the Little Missouri, they succeeded as non-reservation Indians until 1894.

The Three Tribes sold a segment of land to the United States in 1870. The last treaty that diminished the Fort Berthold Indian Reservation was signed in 1886 (ratified in 1891). In the next century, the tribes would win a claims case and receive payment for some of the land lost by executive order fifty years before.

The all-overshadowing troubles with the Lakotas faded after the conclusion of a peace agreement in 1875, with Colonel G. A. Custer as mediator. From then on, the Hidatsa would focus more and more on disagreements with the officials in the capital city.

Good Bear performed the Naxpike (Sun Dance of the Hidatsa) in 1879. He was the final Hidatsa to do so.

== Culture ==
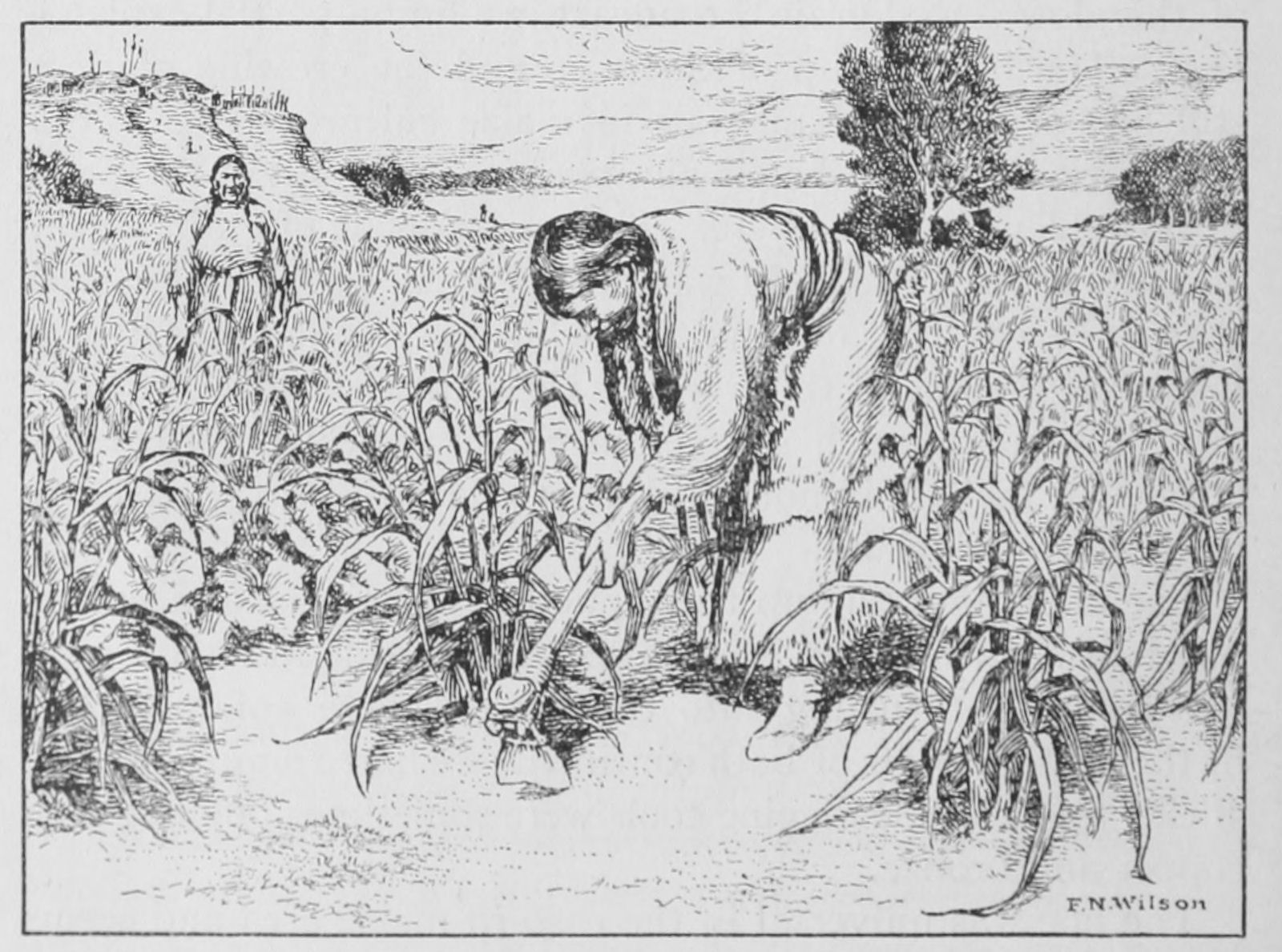
The American Indian Fig 7. Hidatsa women tilling the soil. Nine varieties of corn were grown. "Soft white" could be used in any kind of corn food. "Soft yellow" was easy to pound and turn into meal. Each variety had a distinct taste. Besides corn, the women had beans, sunflowers and squash in their well cared for gardens.

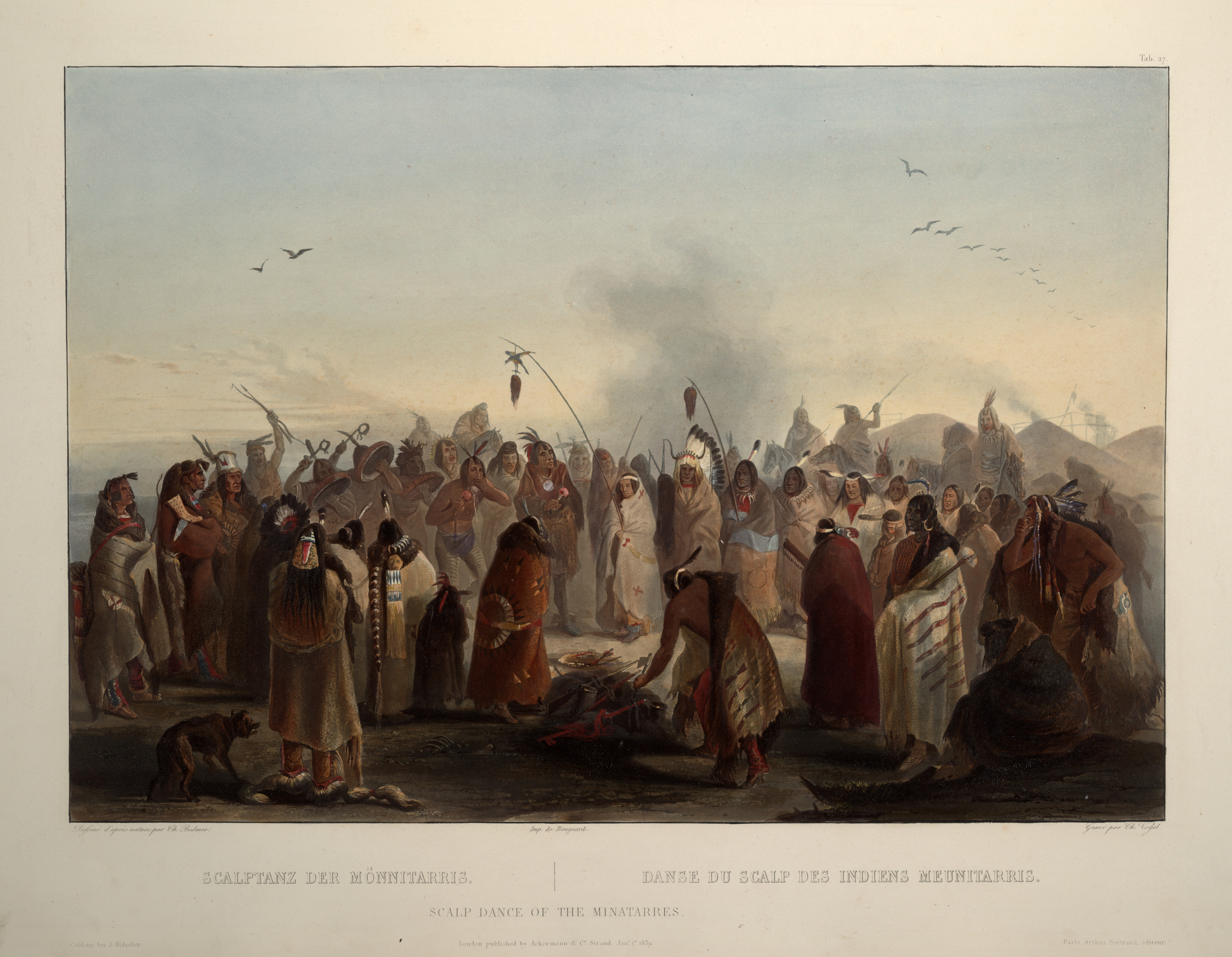
Scalp dance of the Hidatsa

The Hidatsa are a matrilineal people, with descent determined through the maternal line. As the early Mandan and Hidatsa heavily intermarried, children were taught to speak the language of their mother, but understand the dialect of either tribe. A short description of Hidatsa-Mandan culture, including a grammar and vocabulary of the Hidatsa language, was published in 1877 by Washington Matthews, a government physician assigned to the Fort Berthold Indian Reservation.

During the early 20th century, Gilbert Livingston Wilson carried out extensive ethnographic work with the elderly Hidatsa woman, Buffalo Bird Woman. He also interviewed members of her immediate family at Fort Berthold. From his information gathered from them, Wilson described traditional economy, ceremony, and day-to-day practices as remembered by Buffalo-Bird Woman, who lived at Like-a-Fishhook Village.

Frances Densmore recorded a number of ceremonial and personal songs of the Hidatsas before 1920.

Archaeological investigations have provided evidence for the presence of multiple genders in Hidats society pre-colonization.

== Gallery ==
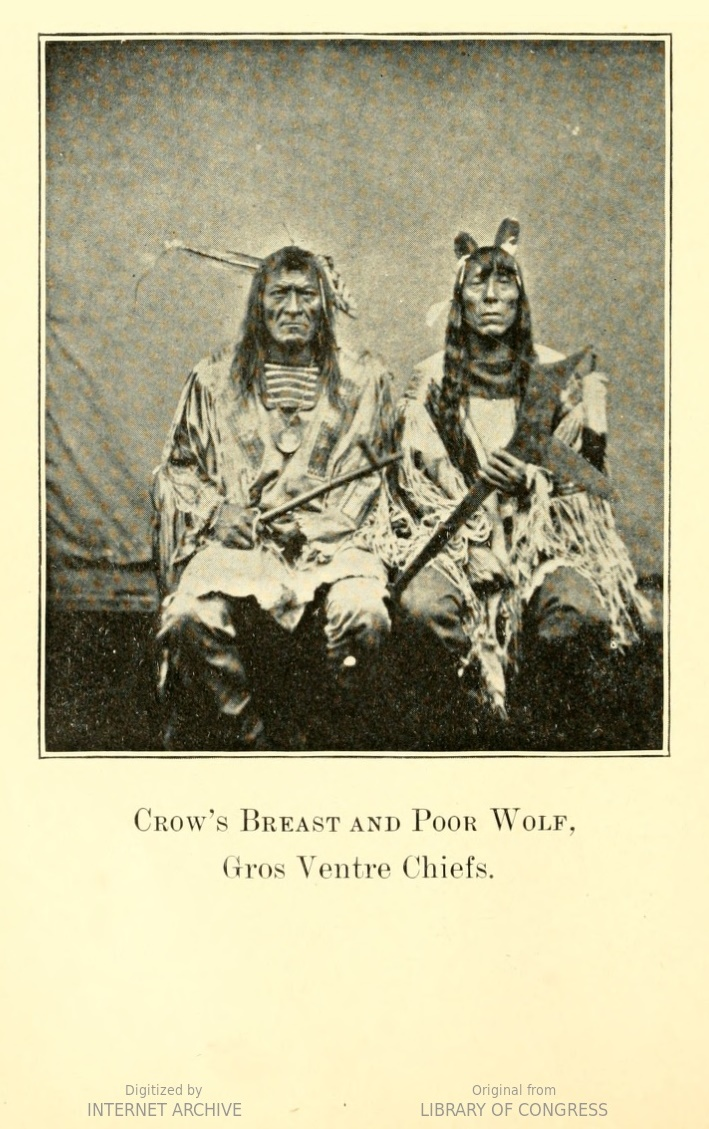
Hidatsa (Gros Ventre) chiefs Crow's Breast and Poor Wolf. Crow's Breast was head chief of the Hidatsa in the mid-1870s.

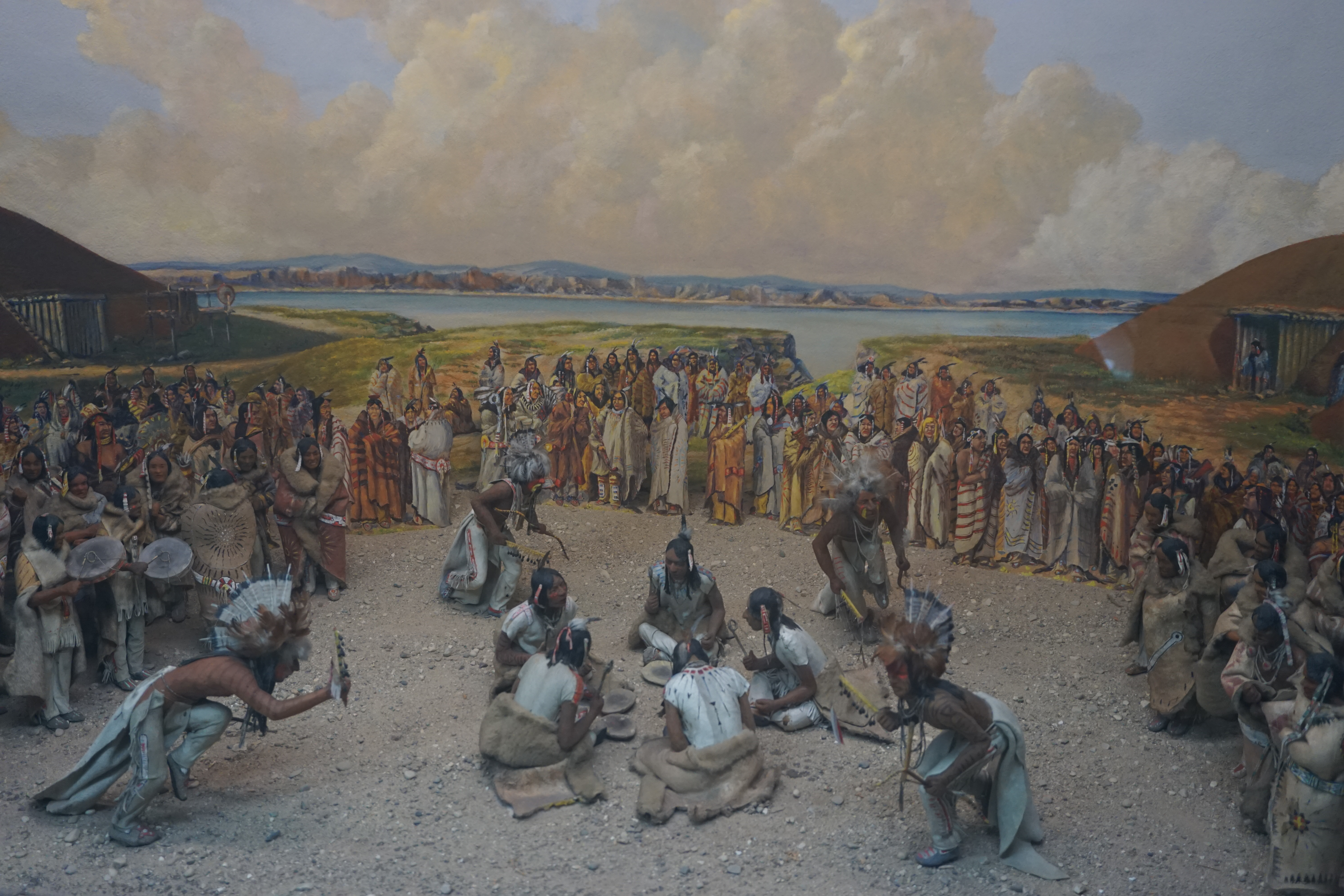
The Dog Dancers, Hidatsa Indians, North Dakota, 19th century diorama at the Milwaukee Public Museum

== See also ==
- Knife River Indian Villages National Historic Site
- White Buffalo Cow Society
