= Monroe City Mill =

Grist mill in Illinois, United States

Coordinates: 38°15′13″N 90°15′43″W

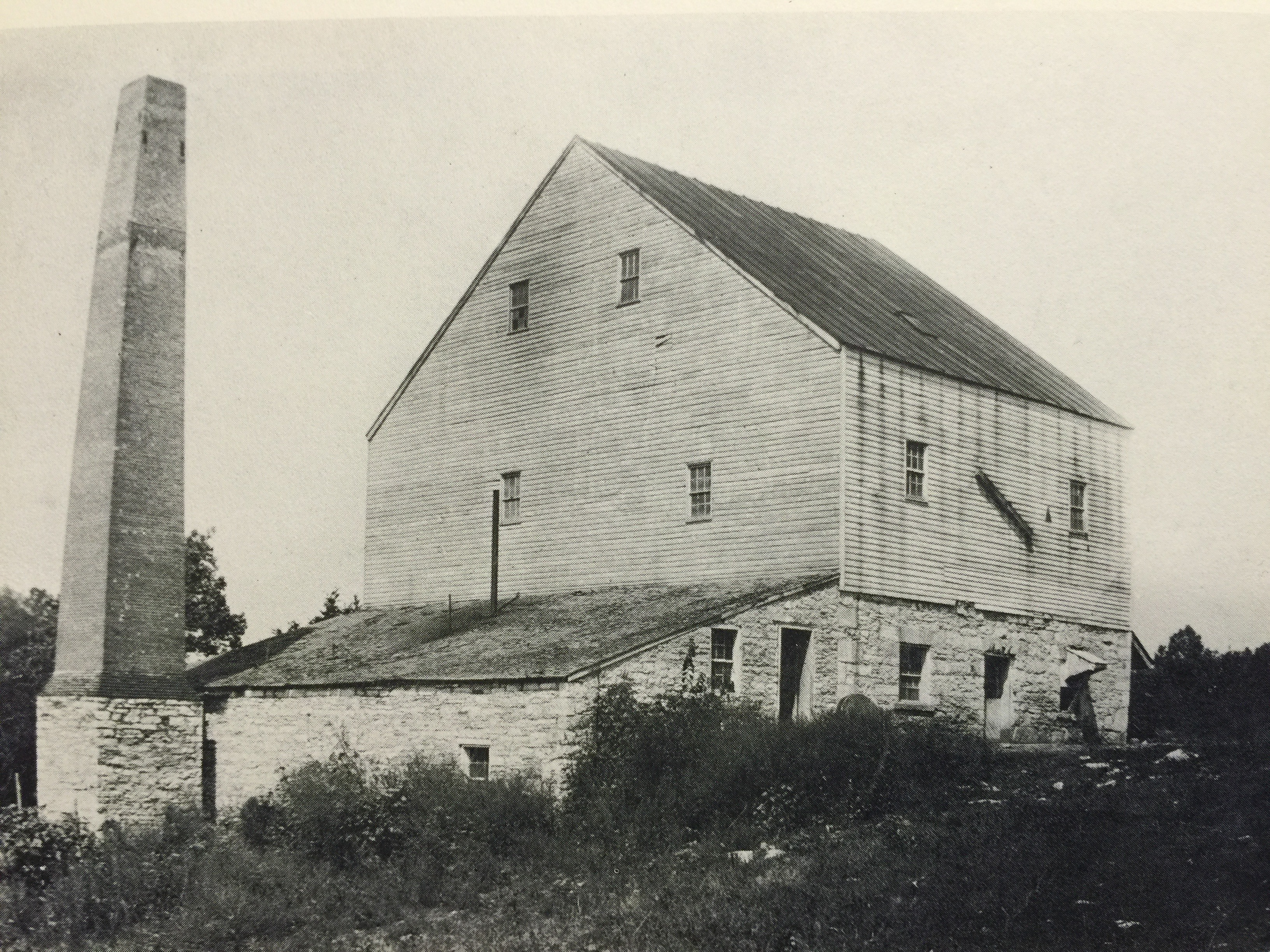
The Monroe City Mill in 1894.The two story section at right would have been built in 1827 by Thomas James. The lean-to and smokestack would have been built in 1851 when the mill was converted to steam power.

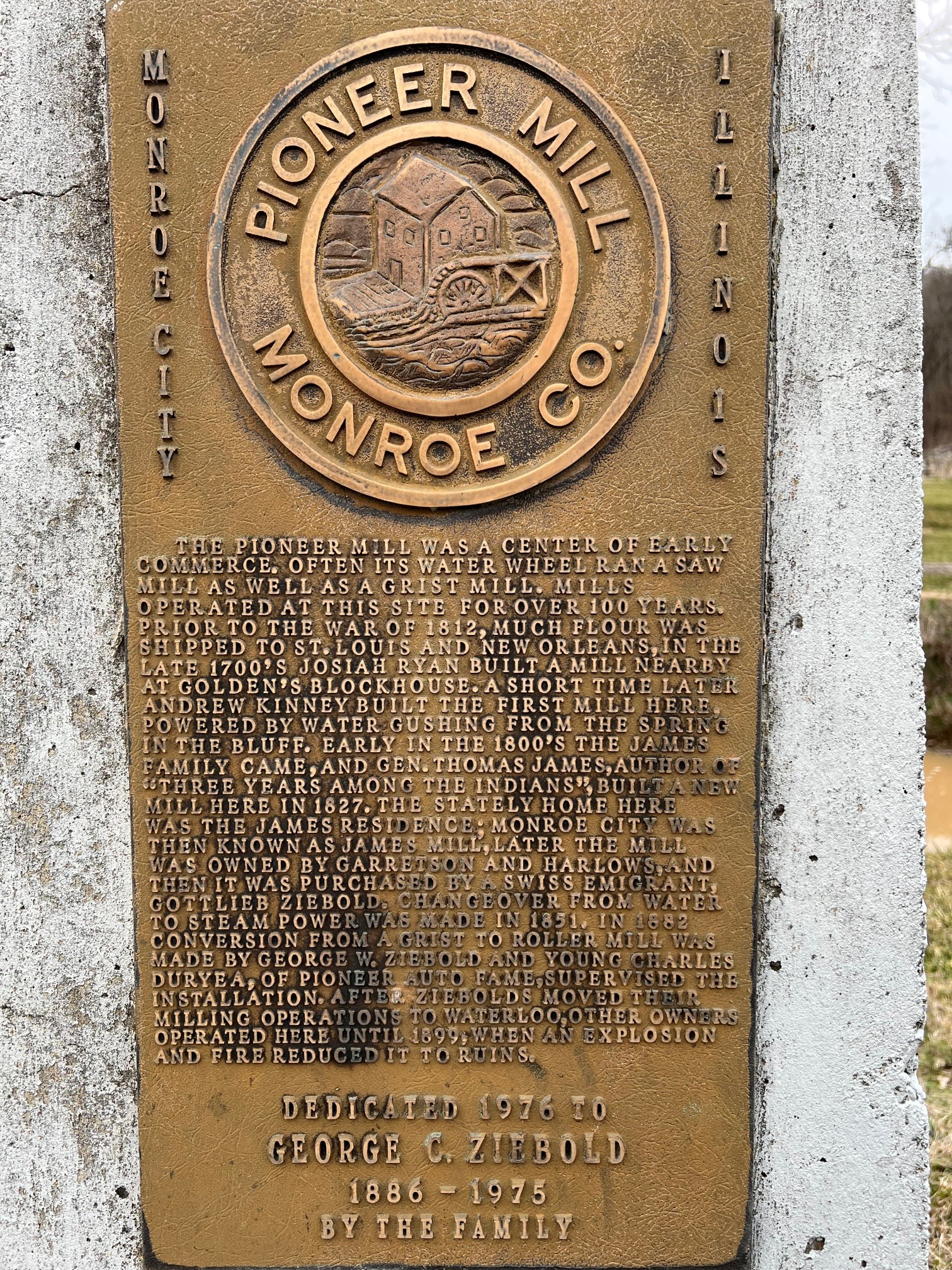
The plaque on the historical monument.

The Monroe City Mill was a grist mill in Monroe City, Illinois, an unincorporated community in the historic Bluff Precinct of Monroe County, Illinois, United States. The area was part of St. Clair County in the Illinois Territory until Monroe County was founded in 1816.

The Mill was built in 1800 and ceased operation in 1899. The stone foundation, including the water-wheel arch, remain on the original site.

The Mill was located on the north bank of the Monroe City Creek, about one quarter mile below its source at a karst spring. The creek provided water to power the mill. The valley created by erosion from the creek is generally referred to as "the Monroe City Hollow."

Over the years, the Mill has been referred to by a number of names, primarily reflecting ownership: Kinney's Mill from 1800 until about 1823; James' Mill from about 1823 until 1849; Garretson and Harlow's Mill from about 1850 to 1866; Ziebold's Mill from 1867 until about 1899. It was also generally known as the Monroe City Mill beginning in 1856 when the Town of Monroe City was platted. In 1798, Josiah Ryan built the original mill in the Monroe City Hollow about 2 miles west of the Monroe City Mill site, also on the banks of the Monroe City Creek.

== Water Source ==
The Monroe City Creek was the water source for the Mill. Until 1856, it was known as Ryan's Creek. In 1800, Kinney built a dam on the creek about 200 yards upstream. The dam was 15' tall and collected water which was channeled to the mill through a wooden trough. Remains of the dam can still be seen. Due to frequent flooding, the dam was unsustainable.

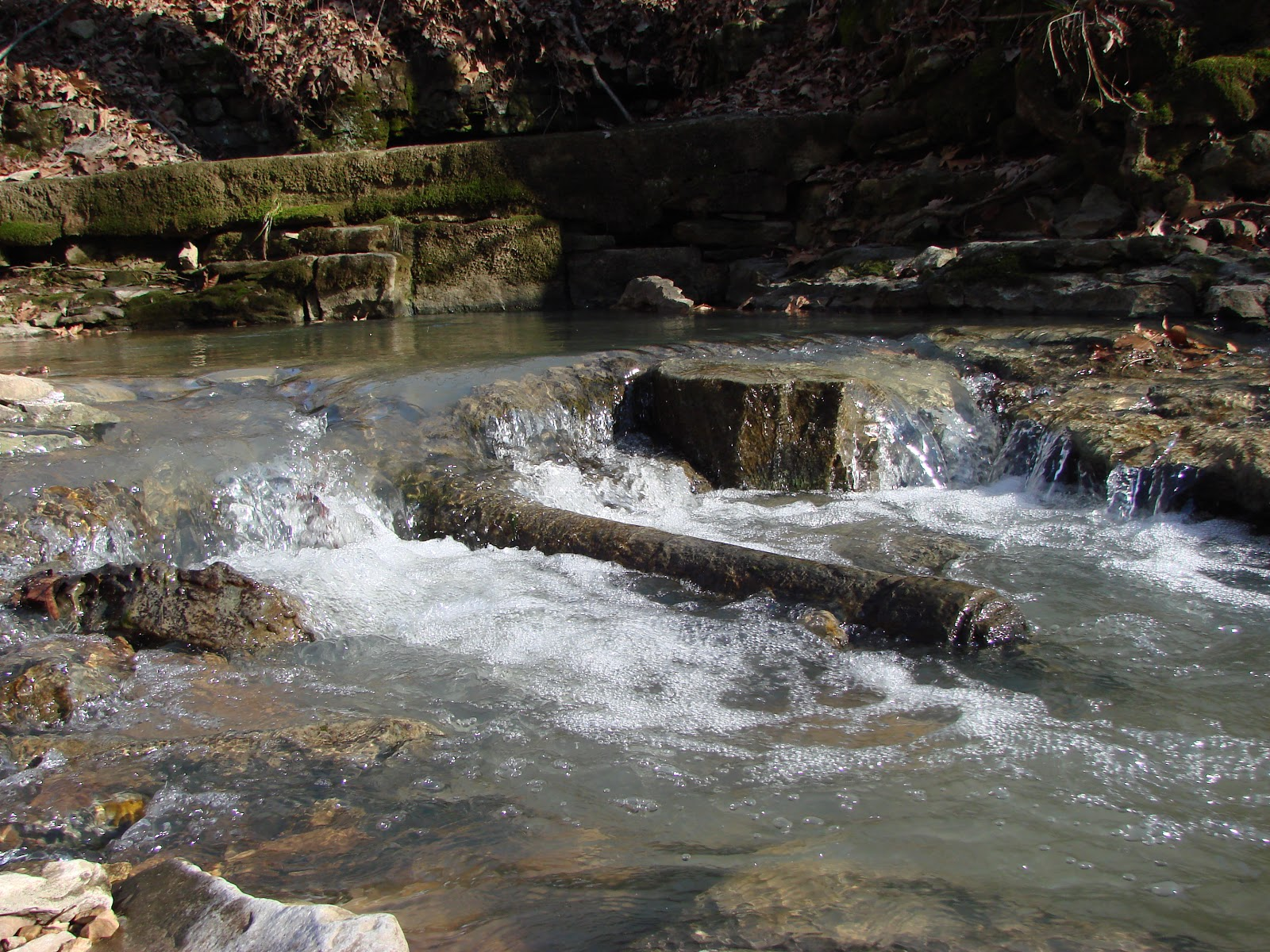
This is the Mill Spring and the remains of the pipe that carried water about 1/4 mile to the Mill.

During a heavy rain, the creek level can rise more than 4 feet. Water would overtop the dam, causing it to erode and fail. At an unknown time, a steel pipe was installed to carry water directly from the spring, about 1/4 mile away. The pipe ran from the spring to the brick house above the Mill. Water was channeled to a public water trough outside the house. It was also channeled inside the house to provide running water, The main channel fed water to the waterwheel, probably an undershot wheel, which turned the grindstones, sifters, saws, and other equipment in the Mill.

== Technology ==
The Mill's primary function was to grind corn and wheat into flour. Initially, a stationary, horizontal rock grindstone was installed. Facing it, a second grindstone was positioned against the first. The water flowing to the mill turned the water wheel, which powered a wooden shaft that turned the upper grindstone. Wheat and corn were funneled between the grindstones. The resulting ground meal then dropped through sifters and into bagging bins, all powered by the water wheel.

In 1851, a steam boiler replaced the waterwheel as the power source. The boiler was mechanically superior to a waterwheel and made more efficient use of water.

In 1880, Gottleib Ziebold upgraded the grindstones to steel rollers which dramatically increased efficiency.

The steam boiler required constant attention to maintain the proper operating pressure. Left unattended, the boiler exploded one day in 1899. The resulting fire destroyed the Mill.

== Products ==
Wheat flour was the primary product produced. Wheat was grown in abundance by nearby farmers. The Mill ground flour for local consumption as well as for export to the world. Flour was packed into barrels and hauled to the dock at Harrisonville on the Mississippi River. Barges transported the flour downstream to New Orleans. From there, it was loaded onto packet ships for export to Europe.

Corn meal was also produced. It was used primarily for local consumption.

Andey Kinney installed a cotton gin in 1814. The machine separated seeds from the cotton. This was a notable piece of entrepreneurship since relatively little cotton was grown in the area. It was one of the few gins in the Illinois Territory.

A lumber saw was also installed in the mill to saw logs from the nearby hardwood forests into usable lumber.

== Kinney's Mill ==
In 1800, Andrew Kinney built the original Mill at the current site. According to the Combined History (1883), "Where Monroe City now stands Andrew Kinney built a water mill, and this vicinity, at an early time, became one of the important business points of the county. From this mill flour was shipped to St. Louis and to New Orleans before the war of 1812." During this time, the town around the Mill was referred to as "Kinney's Mill" as well.

Kinney also built a dam on the creek about 200 yards upstream. The dam was about 15' tall and collected water which was channeled to the mill through a wooden trough. Remains of the dam can still be seen.

John Great, an emigrant from Maryland was the stonemason.

One grindstone is on display at the Rosalie Baum home across the creek from the mill.

In 1814, Kinney installed a cotton gin at the Mill. Below is an advertisement that appeared in the Illinois Herald newspaper, announcing the cotton milling service.

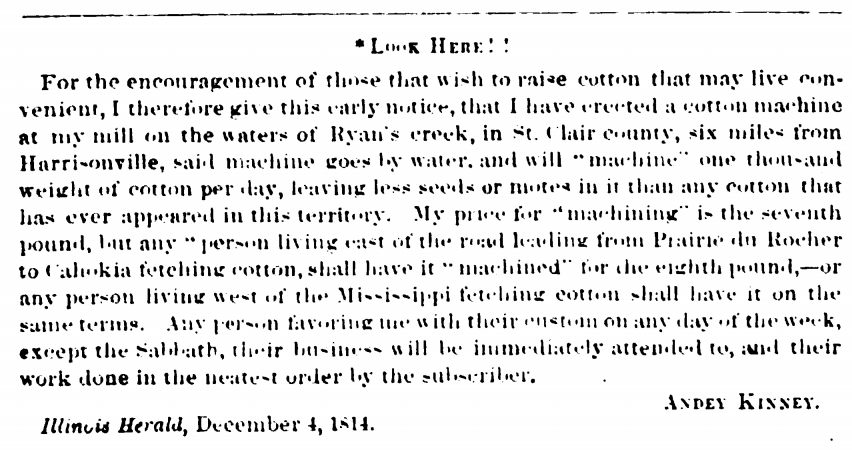
This ad appeared in the Illinois Herald newspaper on December 4, 1814, to announce the opening of Andrew Kinney's cottonseed hulling machine service at the Monroe City Mill.

== James' Mill ==
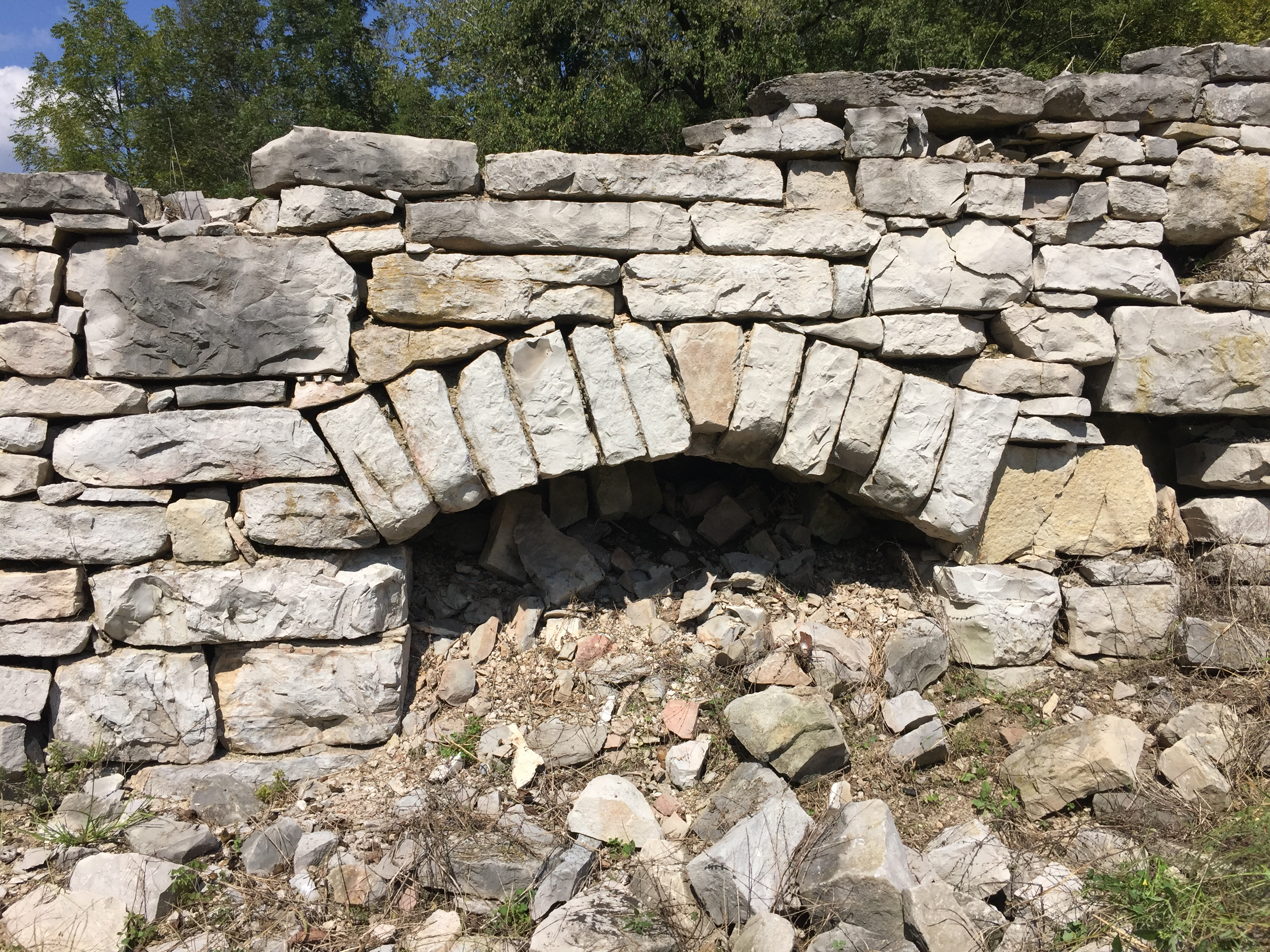
These are the remains of the Monroe City Mill today, showing the rock arch over the water wheel.

General Thomas James purchased the Mill sometime between 1823 and 1827, after he returned from his New Mexico expedition. The Mill burned and James re-built it in 1827. During this time, the town around the Mill was referred to as "James Mill" as well. In 1827 he was also appointed postmaster at the town of James' Mill and kept the position for many years. Thomas James sold the mill to his nephew James James, who operated the mill until 1849.

== Ziebold Mill ==
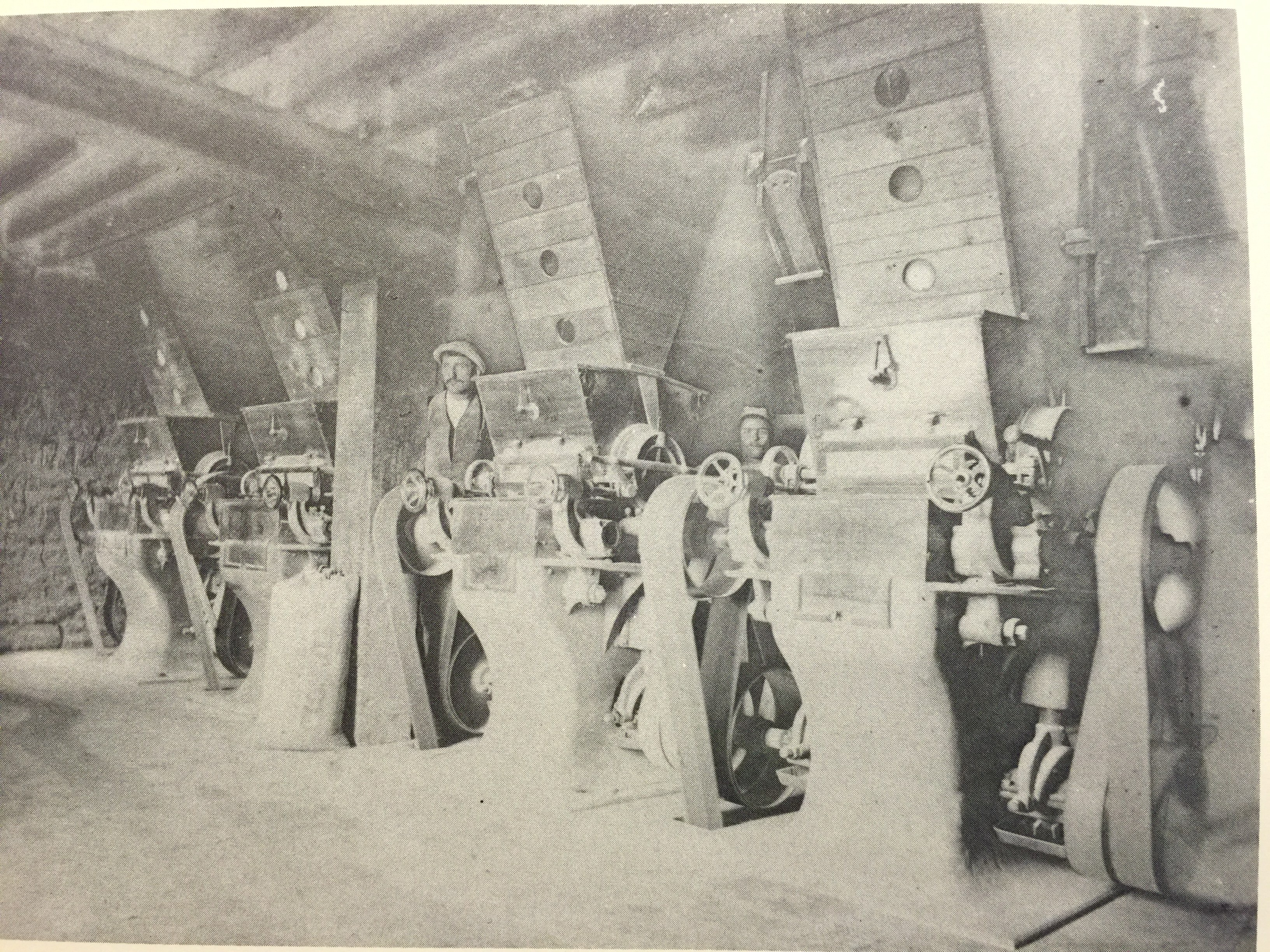
Ziebold Mill Interior

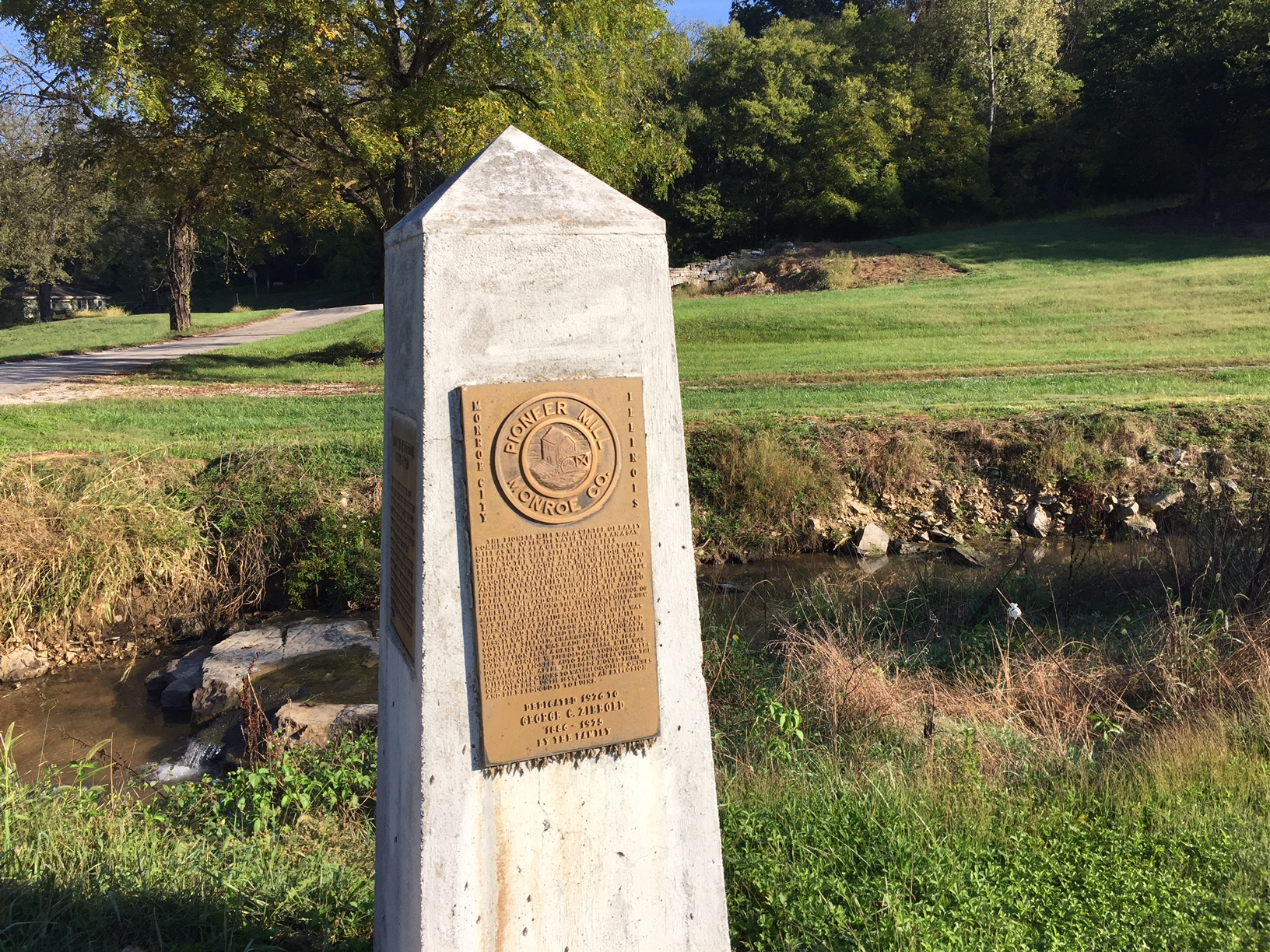
Monument to Ziebold with creek and remains of the mill in background.

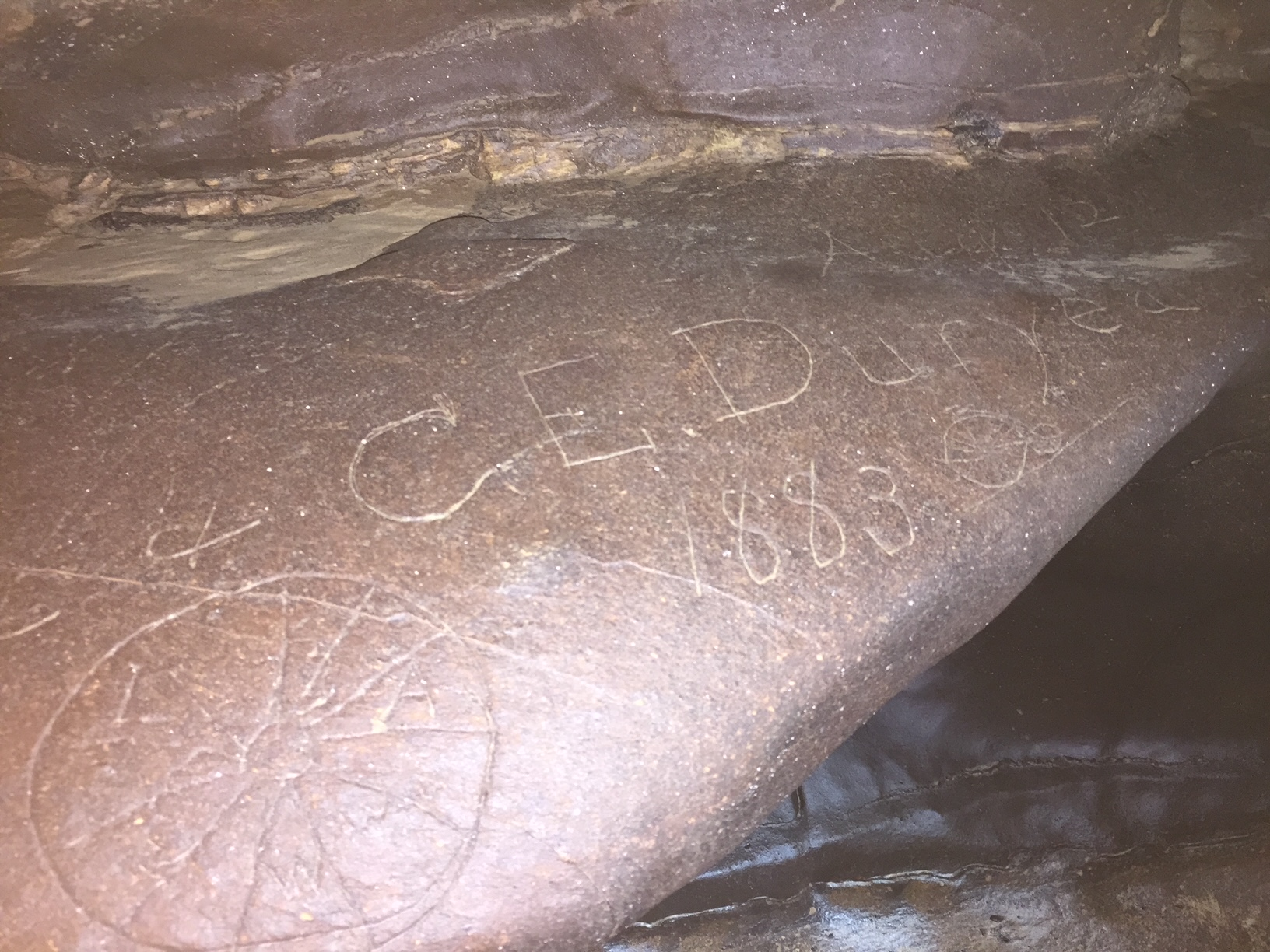
Duryea’s name scrawled on a rock shelf in the Madonnaville Cave

On April 24, 1867, Gottlieb Ziebold purchased the Mill. He moved his family to Monroe City, from the town of California, Moniteau County, Missouri, where he owned a steam grist mill. They lived in either the brick house on the Mill property, or across the creek in the Baum house. In May 1870, he rented the Mill to Peter Bickelhaupt and William Bruchhauser. Gottlieb purchased a mill in Tipton, Moniteau County, Missouri. He moved the family back to Moniteau County and operated the mill there until his wife Magdalena's death in 1872. Gottleib then moved the family back to Monroe City and resumed operating the Mill.

In 1880, Ziebold began a modernization project. He contracted with the Richmond Indiana Steel Company to install metal rollers to replace the water-powered grindstones. In 1882, Richmond Steel sent Charles Duryea to install the new equipment. Duryea spent at least 2 years in Monroe City, living with the Ziebold family. He visited the Madonnaville Cave where he etched his name and bicycle drawings into a rock shelf.

The steam boiler required continual monitoring. One day in 1899, the operator tarried too long at one of the local taverns. While he was away, the steam pressure built too high and exploded. The resulting fire destroyed the mill and was never rebuilt.

== Ryan's Mill ==
The first Mill in Monroe City was built by Josiah Ryan in 1798. It was apparently located further west on the creek, near Golden's Blockhouse.

== Political Subdivisions ==
Readers will note that in his 1814 advertisement, Andey Kinney identifies his mill as being in “St. Clair County” rather than in Monroe County. Several historic political subdivisions were made which explains this apparent discrepancy.

Until 1809, the mill site was in St. Clair County which was part of The Northwest Territory. In 1809, the Illinois Territory, including St. Clair County, was created from the Northwest Territory. In 1816, Monroe County was created by splitting off a southwest corner of St. Clair County. In 1818, the Illinois Territory was dissolved when Illinois was granted statehood.

Therefore, the mill site is in Monroe County, Illinois and has been in the same spot through two Territory changes, two County divisions and one new statehood, during its 222 years.
