= General Thomas James =

1 Nov 1782 - 17 Dec 1847

Thomas James
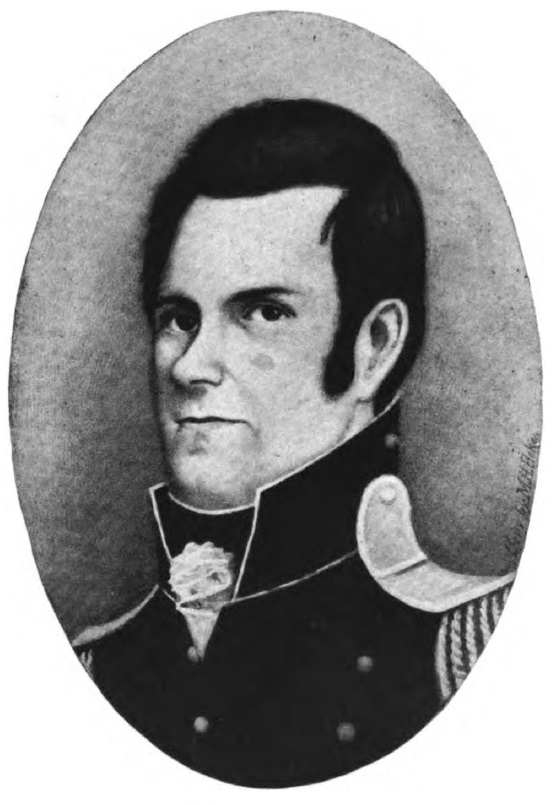
- Portrait drawn by Miss Martha H. Hoke found in Steven's Black Hawk War

Illinois Legislature
- In office 1826–1828

Personal details
- Born: 1782 Maryland, U.S.
- Died: December 1847 (aged 64–65) Monroe City

Military service
- Allegiance: United States
- Branch/service: Illinois Militia
- Rank: Colonel
- Commands: Spy Battalion
- Battles/wars: Black Hawk War

Thomas James (1782–1847) was a trapper and hunter who took part in the expedition with the Missouri Fur Company that was contracted by Meriwether Lewis to safeguard the Mandan Chief Shehaka back to his tribe up the Missouri River. During the expedition he traded with Indians and hunted Beaver in the Rocky Mountains. James was also enlisted with the Illinois militia and held command over the spy battalion during the Black Hawk War.

== Early life and career ==
Thomas James was of Welsh descent, born in Maryland in 1782. His father was Joseph Austin James and his mother was Elizabeth Hosten. In 1803, the family went in search of a new home in the West, living in various locations at Kentucky, and Illinois, until reaching Missouri in 1807 near Florissant.

During this time, Lewis and Clark returned from their expedition, bringing with them the Mandan Indian Chief Shehaka from the Upper Missouri to visit the "Great Father" at Washington City. When Lewis was appointed Governor of Missouri Territory, he sent Chief Shehaka up the Missouri with an escort of about 40 United States troops under the command of Captain Prior. On their arrival to the country of "Rickaree"s, a warlike Indian tribe attacked the Mandans and killed eight or ten soldiers while the rest retreated with Shehaka to St. Louis. With the formation of the Missouri Fur Company, an expedition was proposed to head up the Missouri and into the Rocky Mountains during Spring of 1809. Governor Lewis contracted with the company to convey the Mandan Chief back to his tribe for the sum of $10,000. Thomas James enlisted in this expedition and the money was raised for trading with the Indians and trapping Beaver along the headwaters of the Missouri and Columbia rivers. The total party consisted of 350 men.

After the expedition, he started a career in milling. He purchased Kinney's Mill near the village of New Design in Monroe County, Illinois. This location was known for a time as "James' Mill." and later became known as Monroe City, Illinois.

In 1825, he was elected as a general in the Illinois militia, becoming also a member of the Illinois legislature, where he served between 1826 and 1828. In 1827 he was also appointed postmaster at the town of James' Mills and kept the position for many years.

== Black Hawk War ==
James served as a major in the Black Hawk War, having a "spy battalion" under his command that was composed of three companies. They were led by Captain Daniel Price, Peter Warren, and Thomas Harrison.

Albert Sidney Johnson signed orders designating Thomas James as a colonel during the war.

== Death ==
At the close of the war, James returned to his former employments and died at Monroe City in December 1847.

== Works ==
A year before his death, he published the work Three Years Among the Indians and Mexicans as a memoir of expeditions as a hunter and trapper, wherein he details the a literary illustration of the character and customs of the Indians and Mexicans, accounting too of the battles he found himself in.
