= Monroe City, Illinois =

- Unincorporated community
- Etymology: James Monroe, 5th President
- Location within Illinois Location within the United States
- Coordinates: 38°15′21″N 90°15′57″W
- Country: United States
- State: Illinois
- County: Monroe
- Precinct: 15
- Elevation: 449 ft (137 m)
- Time zone: UTC-6 (CST)
  - Summer (DST): UTC-5 (CDT)
- Postal code: 62298
- Area code: 618

Monroe City is a small unincorporated community in the historic Bluff Precinct of Monroe County, Illinois, United States. As of 2016, the population is approximately 45 people, living in 23 homes. The community is generally considered to comprise the platted towns of Monroe City (1856), Woodville (1857), and the area immediately adjacent to those towns. The core community is located in a valley, or colloquial "hollow," commonly known as the Monroe City Hollow. The central natural feature of the Hollow is the all-season Monroe City Creek. Governmental functions are provided by Monroe County. Electric utilities are provided by the Monroe County Electric Cooperative and public water is offered by the Fountain Water District.

== History ==
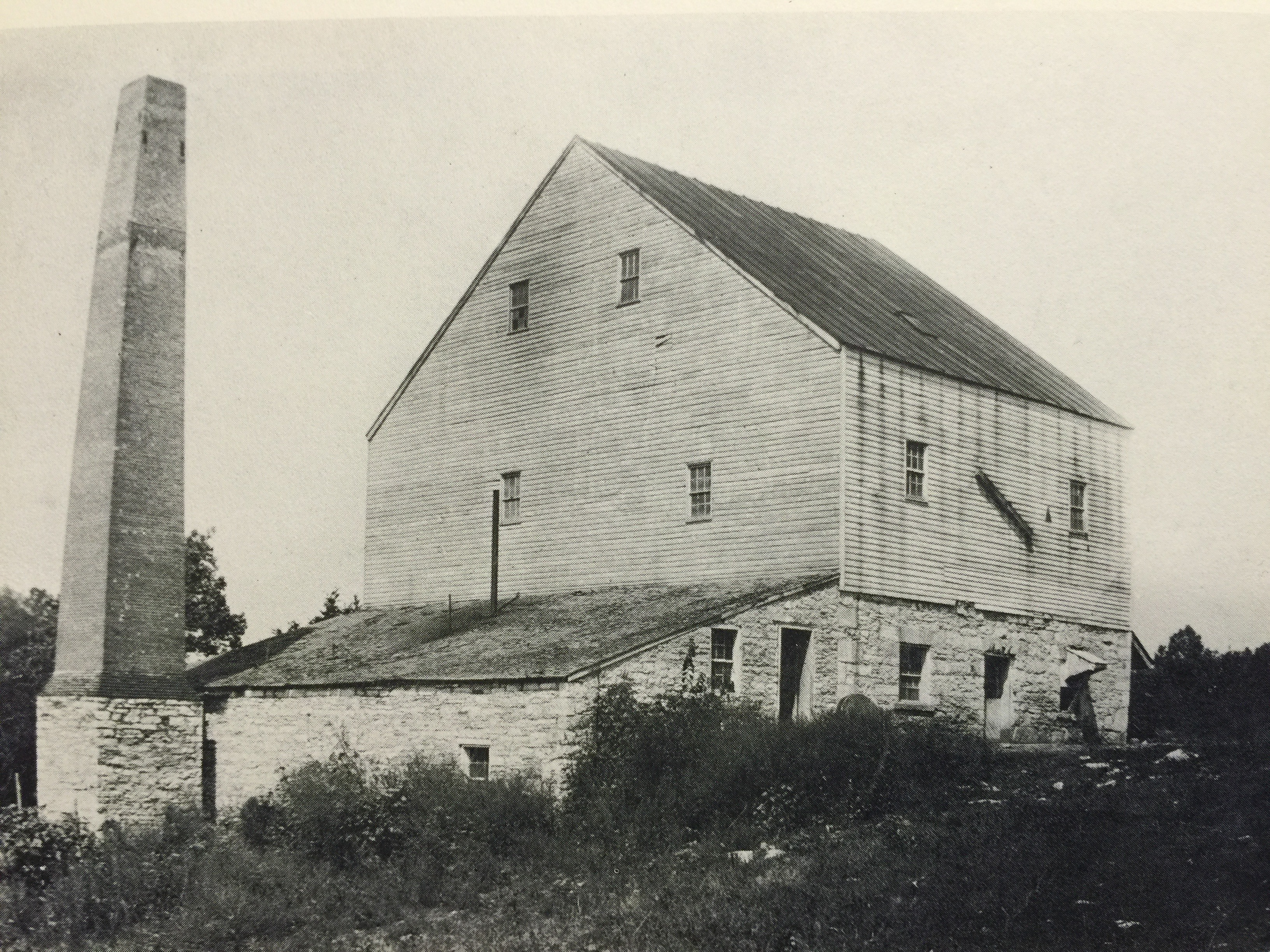
The Monroe City Mill in 1894.The two story section at right would have been built in 1827 by Thomas James. The lean-to and smokestack would have been built in 1851when the mill was converted to steam power.

In 1790, a man named Golden built a blockhouse in the hollow to protect local settlers. In 1798, Josia Ryan built a mill near the blockhouse. At that time, the creek was known as "Ryan's Creek." In 1800, Andrew Kinney built a grist mill on the creek. The area became known as "Kinney's Mill." In 1823, General Thomas James purchased Kinney's mill and the area became known as "James' Mill."

By 1883, the community was a thriving frontier town. The mill was the economic engine that drove the community. It was supported by a complement of businesses, schools, churches, and social organizations. Approximately 300 people lived in the general trading area.

The hardwood forests that surrounded Monroe City supported a variety of timber-related businesses. Sawmills were established to provide lumber to the growing community. In 1851, the mill was converted to steam power which drove demand for firewood. Steam boats on the nearby Mississippi River were also supplied with firewood from Monroe City.

The Foster family of Monroe City were early coopers who made flour barrels and sold them to the grist mill operators. The original cooper shed is preserved intact on lot 8 of Woodville.

When the railroads came through Monroe County in the early 20th century, wooden railroad ties were hewn in Monroe City. Harold G. Baum paid woodcutters 15 cents for each tie they could cut from the trees on the family farm. He sold those ties to the railroad in bulk.

In 1933, Harold G. Baum established a woodworking shop at the family farm in Monroe City. His signature item was the "HUCKABAY & BAUM" brand baseball bats, made from hickory and ash harvested on the farm.

Both the milling and timber businesses declined in the early 20th century as production shifted to centralized operations. In 1956, the last school in Monroe City closed. The population has continued to decline as people follow jobs to more urban areas.

=== Founding ===
Monroe City was platted in 1856 by J.B. Harlow, consisting of approximately 117 lots, 9 named streets and 7 named alleys. It was laid out as part of the southwest corner of Survey 489, Township 3 South 11 West of the 3rd Principal Meridian. In 1857, Woodville was platted by H. Wetzel, consisting of 27 lots with 1 named street. It was laid out as part of the southeast corner of Survey 567, Township 3 South 11 West. The platted towns are separated by approximately 75 feet.

== Geology ==
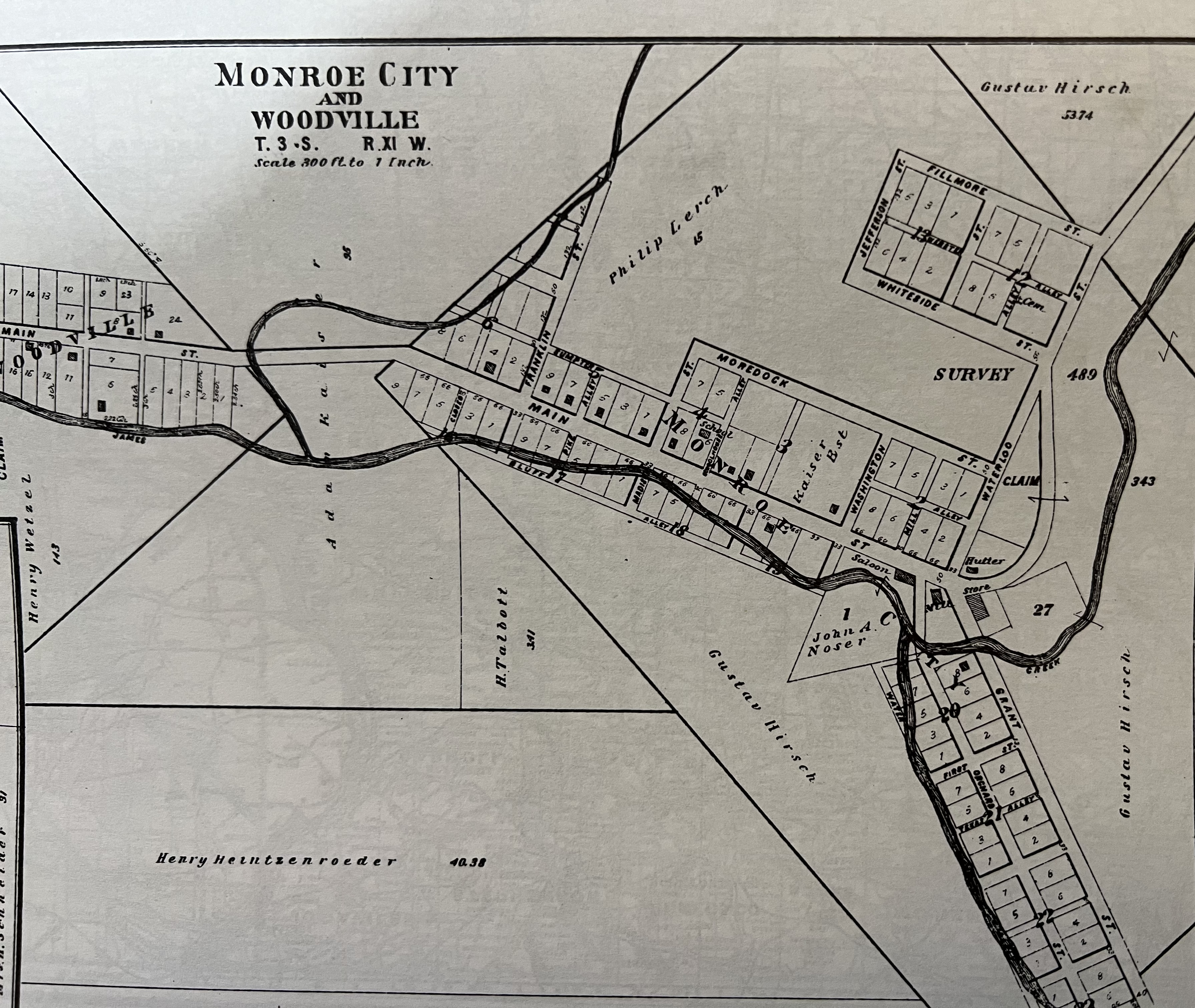
Plat maps of Monroe City and Woodville, from "The Combined Atlas of Monroe County Illinois', 1901

The underlying Karst geology has influenced much of the economic and social development of Monroe City. Water flows from underground karst waterways, coming to the surface at more than 24 springs in The Monroe City Creek system, resulting in an all-weather water source.
