= Atomic tourism =

Tourism involving travel to nuclear sites

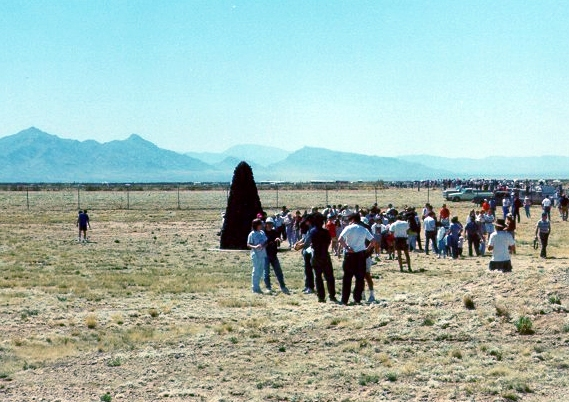
Tourists at ground zero, Trinity site.

Atomic tourism or nuclear tourism is a form of tourism in which visitors witness nuclear tests or learn about the Atomic Age by traveling to significant sites in atomic history such as nuclear test reactors, museums with nuclear weapon artifacts, delivery vehicles, sites where atomic weapons were detonated, and nuclear power plants.

In the United States, the Center for Land Use Interpretation has conducted tours of the Nevada Test Site, Trinity Site, Hanford Site, and other historical atomic age sites, to explore the cultural significance of these Cold War nuclear zones. The book Overlook: Exploring the Internal Fringes of America describes the purpose of this tourism as "windows into the American psyche, landmarks that manifest the rich ambiguities of the nation's cultural history." A Bureau of Atomic Tourism was proposed by American photographer Richard Misrach and writer Myriam Weisang Misrach in 1990.

Visitors to the Chernobyl Exclusion Zone often visit the nearby deserted city of Pripyat. The Hiroshima Peace Memorial (Genbaku Dome), which survived the destruction of Hiroshima, is now a UNESCO World Heritage Site at the center of Hiroshima Peace Memorial Park. Bikini Atoll was at one time the site of a diving tourism initiative. As of 2012, China planned to build a tourist destination at its first atomic test site, the Malan Base at Lop Nur in the Xinjiang Uyghur Autonomous Region.

Several nuclear power plants offer tours of the facilities or provide education at visitor centers.

== Nuclear tests ==
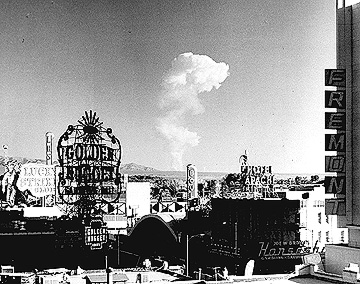
Mushroom cloud seen from downtown Las Vegas

During the early Atomic Age, fission was viewed as a sign of progress and modernity.

In this light Las Vegas became in the mid-1940s and early 1950s an original place of atomic tourism when nuclear tests were performed at Nevada Test Site. Seeing nuclear tests was advertised and viewings were hosted in Las Vegas at the time. The city of Las Vegas and its Chamber of Commerce nicknamed Vegas as the "Atomic City" in an attempt to attract tourists. So called "bomb viewing parties" took place on desert hilltops, or more famously at the panoramic Sky Room at the Desert Inn, and casinos held Miss Atomic pageants while serving Atomic cocktails.

== Atomic museums ==
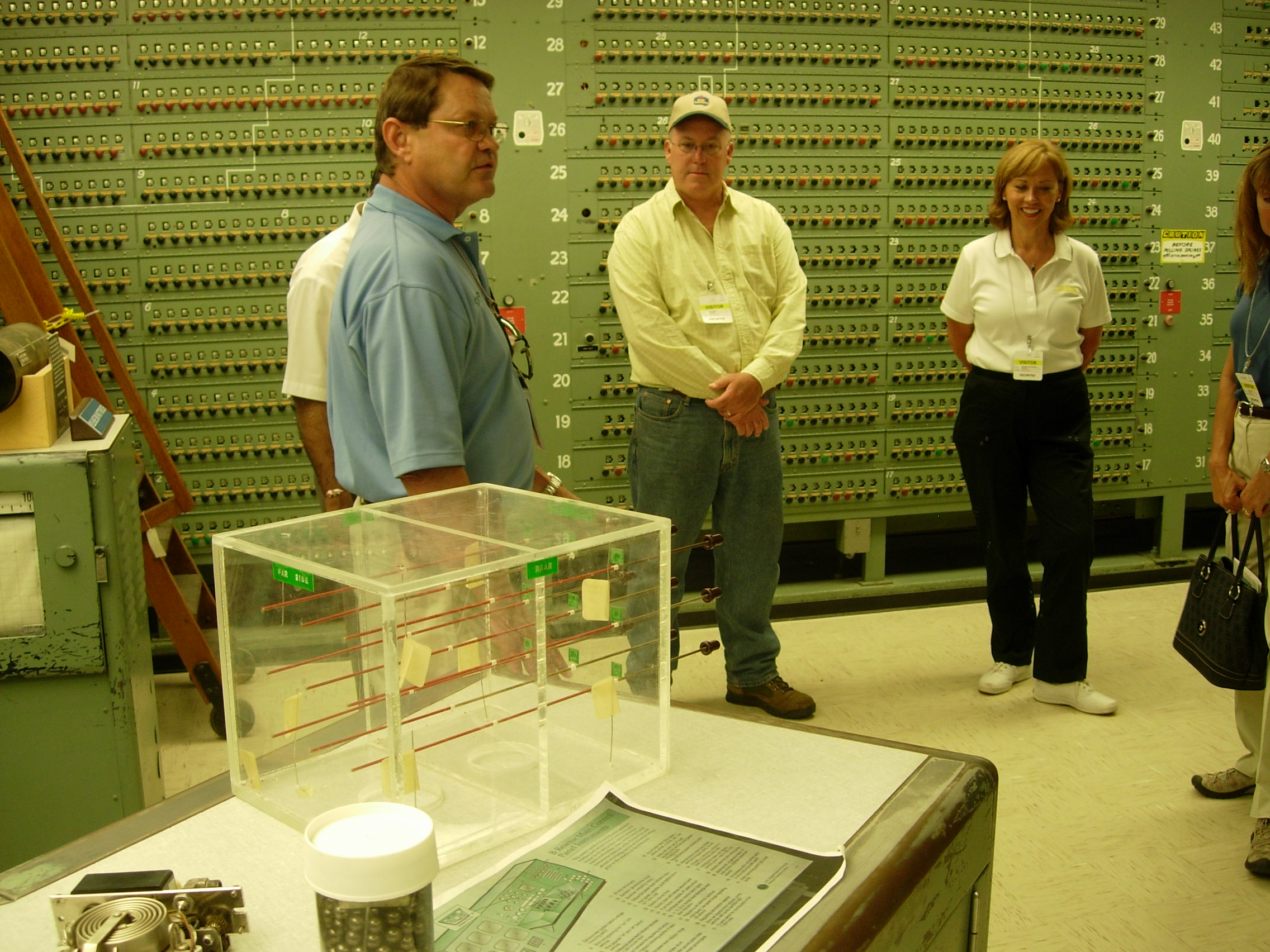
Tri-Cities Visitor and Convention Bureau tour of the Hanford Site

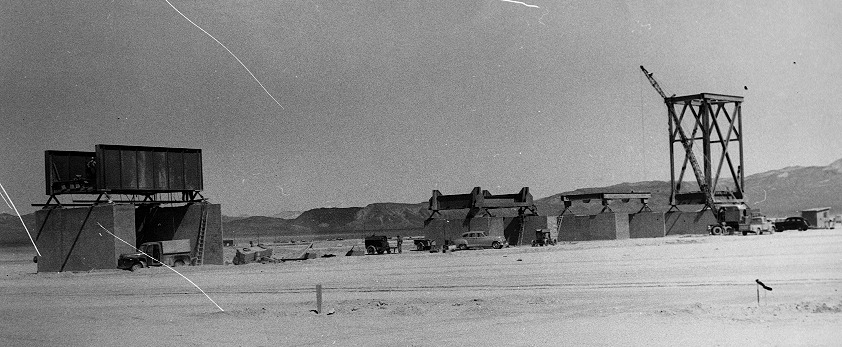
NNSA-NSO-736

=== Research and production ===
- Los Alamos Historical Museum, Los Alamos, New Mexico – items from the Manhattan Project
- Bradbury Science Museum, Los Alamos, New Mexico – history of the Manhattan Project
- X-10 Graphite Reactor, Oak Ridge, Tennessee – first nuclear reactor to produce Plutonium 239
- Savannah River Site, South Carolina – production site of plutonium and tritium
- Experimental Breeder Reactor I, Arco, Idaho – first nuclear reactor to produce electrical power, first breeder reactor, and first reactor to use plutonium as fuel
- Obninsk Nuclear Power Plant, Obninsk – the first nuclear reactor in the world that produced commercial electricity
- Hanford Site, Washington – location of the B Reactor which produced some of the plutonium for the Trinity test and the Fat Man bomb
- George Herbert Jones Laboratory, Chicago, Illinois – where plutonium was first isolated and characterized
- American Museum of Science and Energy, Oak Ridge, Tennessee – bomb casings
- National Atomic Testing Museum, Las Vegas, Nevada – offers tours to the Nevada Test Site
- Strategic missile forces museum in Ukraine, Ukraine
- National Museum of Nuclear Science & History, Albuquerque, New Mexico

=== Delivery vehicles ===
- Tinian Airfield, Northern Mariana Islands – launch site for the atomic bombings of Hiroshima and Nagasaki, Japan during World War II
- Titan Missile Museum, Sahuarita, Arizona – public underground missile museum
- Nike Missile Site SF-88, Marin County, California – fully restored Nike missile complex
- Ronald Reagan Minuteman Missile State Historic Site, Cooperstown, North Dakota – last surviving complete facilities from USAF 321st Missile Wing (01Nov63-30Sep98), namely Oscar-Zero Missile Alert Facility (4 mi N of Cooperstown) and November-33 Launch Facility (missile silo, 2 mi E of Cooperstown)
- National Museum of Nuclear Science & History, Albuquerque, New Mexico – missiles and rockets
- National Museum of the United States Air Force, Dayton, Ohio – the Nagasaki B-29 bomber (Bockscar) and missiles
- National Air and Space Museum, Washington, D.C. – the Hiroshima B-29 bomber (Enola Gay)
- White Sands Missile Range Museum, New Mexico
- Air Force Space and Missile Museum, Cape Canaveral Space Force Station, Florida
- Air Force Armament Museum, Eglin Air Force Base, Florida
- Minuteman Missile National Historic Site, Wall, South Dakota – Launch Control Facility Delta-01 with its corresponding underground Launch Control Center and Launch Facility (Missile Silo) Delta-09
- South Dakota Air and Space Museum, Ellsworth Air Force Base, Box Elder, South Dakota – Minuteman Missile Transporter truck, 44th Missile Wing Training Launch Facility (Training Missile Silo)
- Strategic Air Command & Aerospace Museum, Ashland, Nebraska – a museum focusing on aircraft and nuclear missiles of the United States Air Force
- Quebec-One Missile Alert Facility, Laramie County, Wyoming – preserved Peacekeeper missile launch control facility

=== Miscellaneous ===
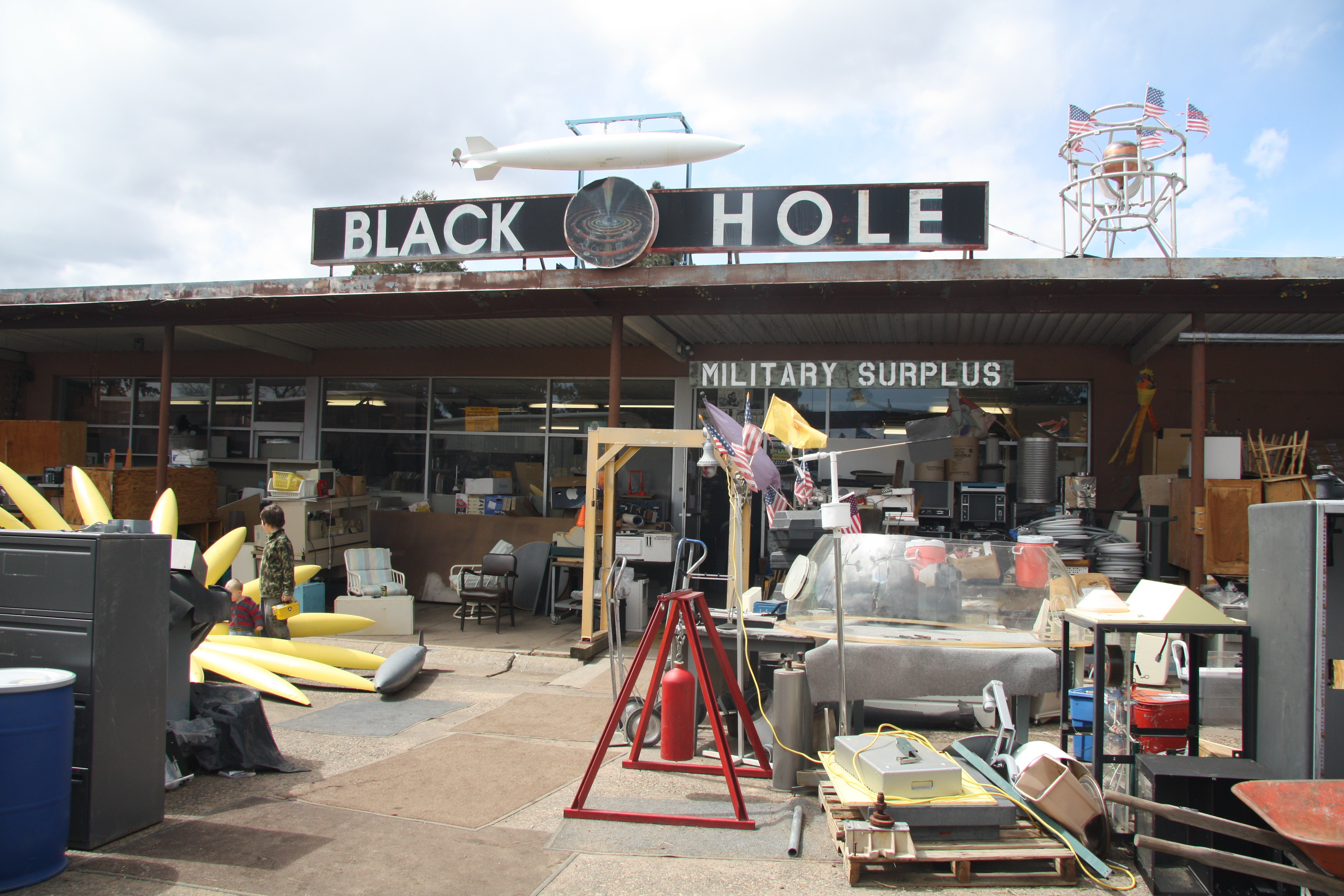
The Black Hole, Los Alamos, New Mexico

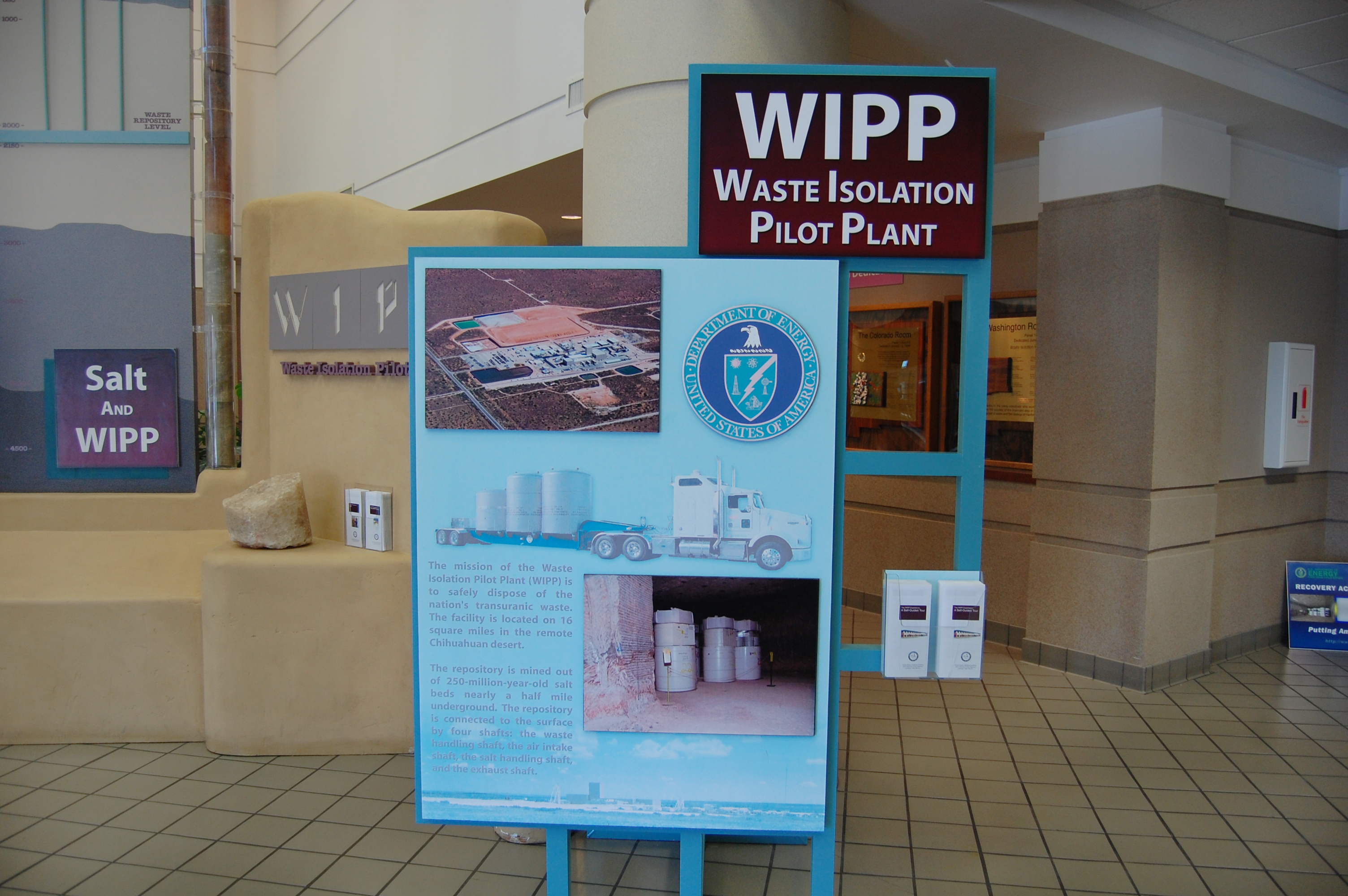
WIPP visitor center, Department of Energy field office, Carlsbad

- Greenbrier Bunker, Greenbrier County, West Virginia – underground bunker for the United States Congress
- Hiroshima Peace Memorial Park, Hiroshima – contains the Hiroshima Peace Memorial, Hiroshima Peace Memorial Museum, and related memorials
- Nagasaki Peace Park and Nagasaki Atomic Bomb Museum, Nagasaki
- The Daigo Fukuryū Maru ship, a Japanese fishing boat that was contaminated after the Castle Bravo detonation in 1954. It is now on display in Tokyo at the Tokyo Metropolitan Daigo Fukuryū Maru Exhibition Hall.
- CFS Carp – also known as The Diefenbunker, a cold war nuclear museum in a former underground Canadian military facility outside of Ottawa
- Chernobyl Museum, Kyiv
- Hack Green Secret Nuclear Bunker, Cheshire countryside near the town on Nantwich, UK
- Kelvedon Hatch Secret Nuclear Bunker
- Waste Isolation Pilot Plant Field Office exhibit hall

== Atomic mines ==
- Port Radium on Canada's Great Bear Lake site of a uranium mine important to the Manhattan Project

== Explosion sites ==
The alphabetic list by nations is as follows:

- Australia
  - Maralinga, South Australia – site of Operation Buffalo and Operation Antler

- India
  - Pokhran, Rajasthan – site of the Pokhran-II test
- Japan
  - Hiroshima, first wartime use of an atomic bomb
  - Nagasaki, last wartime use of an atomic bomb
- United States
  - Carson National Forest, Rio Arriba County, New Mexico – site of Project Gasbuggy
  - Carlsbad, New Mexico – site of Project Gnome
  - Nevada Test Site, Nye County, Nevada – US nuclear test site
  - Nye County, Nevada – site of Project Faultless
  - Pacific Proving Grounds, US nuclear test site
  - Parachute, Colorado – site of Project Rulison
  - Rio Blanco County, Colorado – site of Project Rio Blanco
  - Sand Springs Range, Nevada – site of Project Shoal
  - Trinity Site, Socorro County, New Mexico – site of the first artificial nuclear explosion
- Soviet Union
  - Semipalatinsk Test Site, testing venue for the Soviet Union's nuclear weapons.

== Atomic accidents ==
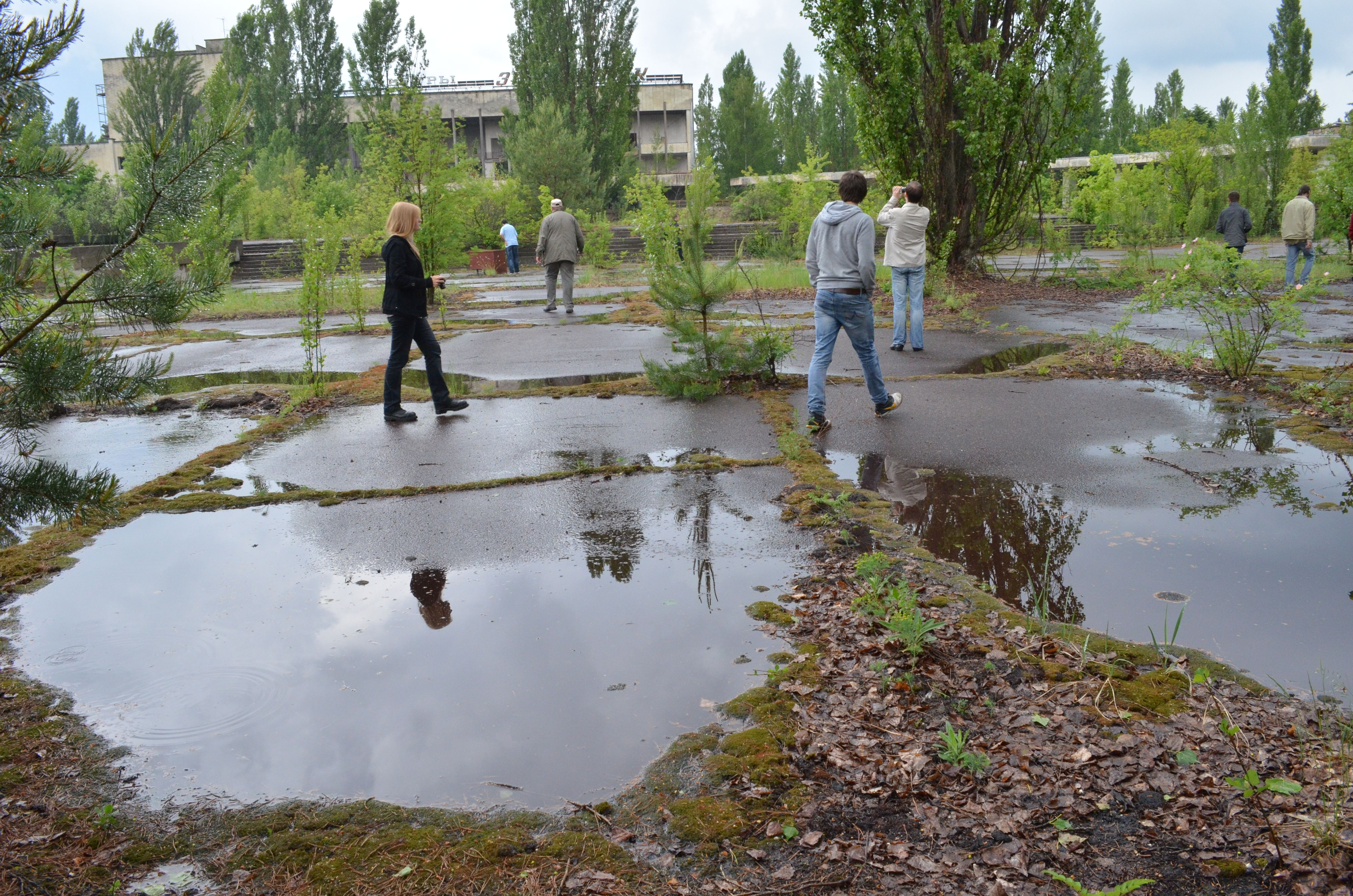
Chernobyl

- The Chernobyl disaster was the worst nuclear power plant accident in history. Tourists can access the exclusion zone surrounding the plant, and in particular the abandoned city of Prypiat.
- Three Mile Island was the site of a well publicized accident, the most significant in the history of American commercial nuclear power. The Three Mile Island Visitor Center, in Middletown, PA, educates the public through exhibitions and video displays.
- Windscale fire occurred on October 10, 1957, where the graphite core of a British nuclear reactor at Windscale, Cumbria, caught fire, releasing substantial amounts of radioactive contamination into the surrounding area. The event, known as the Windscale fire, was considered the world's worst reactor accident until the Three Mile Island accident in 1979. Both incidents were dwarfed by the magnitude of the Chernobyl disaster in 1986. The Visitor Center was closed in 1992, and the public may no longer visit, it has been turned into a center for supplier conferences, and business events.

== Literary and cinematic works on atomic tourism ==
The novel O-Zone, by Paul Theroux, involves a group of wealthy New York tourists who enter and party in a post-nuclear disaster zone in the Ozarks.
