= Ural Technological College =

Coordinates: 56.810°N 61.321°E

- Уральский технологический колледж - филиал федерального государственного автономного образовательного учреждения высшего профессионального образования «Национальный исследовательский ядерный университет «МИФИ»
- Type: State university
- Established: 1957
- Location: 27 Lenina street, Zerechny, Sverdlovsk Oblast, Russia, 624250, Zarechny, Sverdlovsk Oblast, Russia
- Website: http://www.urtk-mephi.ru/

Ural Technological College (Russian: Уральский технологический колледж) is a higher education institute in Zarechny.

== History ==
The institution was established in 1956 as a branch of Sverdlovsk Power Construction Technicum (Russian: Свердловский энергостроительный техникум) to provide specialists for the construction of Beloyarsk Nuclear Power Station. Over the years the educational focus transformed with the needs of the power station and local industries.

In 1990, it was renamed Beloyarsk Polytechnic College and started to provide education services for a broader range of disciplines. It was renamed to its current name Ural Technological College in 2004 and became a branch of the National Research Nuclear University in 2009.
