= Quebec-One Missile Alert Facility =

Wyoming state historic site

Quebec 01 Missile Alert Facility State Historic Site
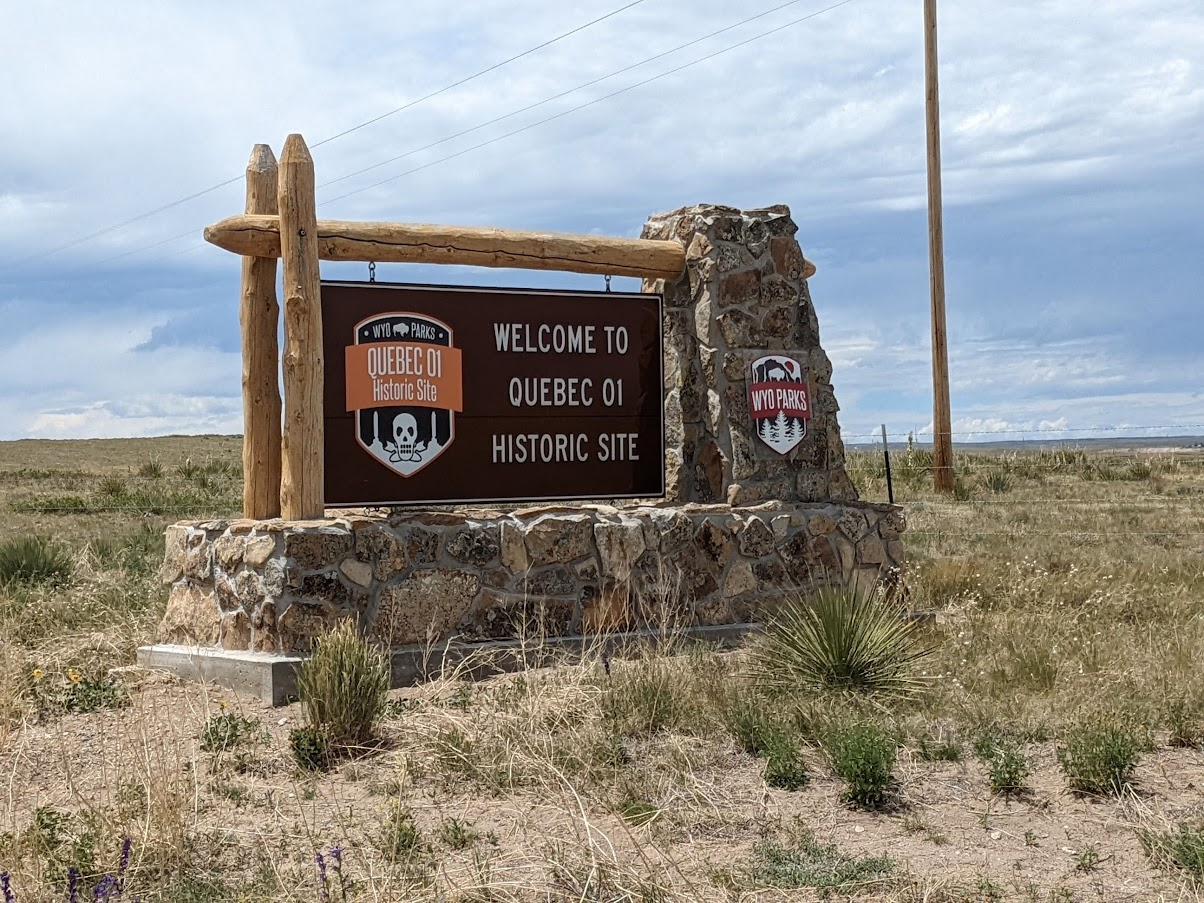
- Entrance Sign to the Quebec-01 Historic Site in Chugwater, Wyoming

- Location within Wyoming Location within the United States
- Location: Laramie County, Wyoming, U.S.
- Nearest city: Cheyenne, Wyoming
- Coordinates: 41°32′35″N 104°54′10″W
- Established: December 2017
- Governing body: Wyoming State Parks

- Quebec-One Missile Alert Facility
- U.S. National Register of Historic Places
- U.S. National Historic Landmark
- Area: less than one acre
- NRHP reference No.: 100009836

Significant dates
- Added to NRHP: December 11, 2023
- Designated NHL: December 11, 2023

The Quebec-One Missile Alert Facility, also known as Quebec-01 or Q-01, located 30 miles north of Cheyenne, Wyoming, near Chugwater, was a United States Air Force ICBM launch control facility. It was operated by the 400th Missile Squadron constructed in 1962. The Missile Alert Facility operated with a Minuteman missile until 1970 when it was converted to a Minuteman-III site. Finally in 1986, the facility was converted to operate the Peacekeeper ICBM. The facility was deactivated in 2005 and turned over to Wyoming State Parks in December 2017. The facility was opened to the public in August 2019 as the Quebec 01 Missile Alert Facility State Historic Site after restoration work done by the United States Air Force.

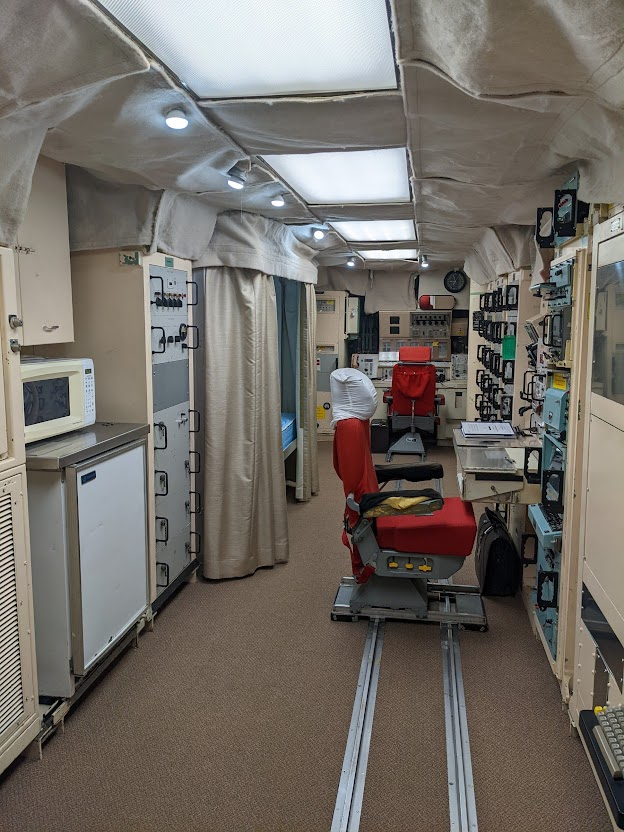
Underground command and control center at the former Quebec-01 Missile Alert Station

== See also ==
- List of museums in Wyoming
- Minuteman Missile National Historic Site
- Ronald Reagan Minuteman Missile State Historic Site
- Titan Missile Museum
- Strategic Air and Space Museum
- Strategic missile forces museum in Ukraine
