= Zarechny, Sverdlovsk Oblast =

Town in Sverdlovsk Oblast, Russia

Zarechny Заречный
- Town
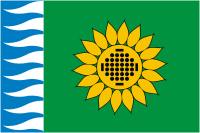
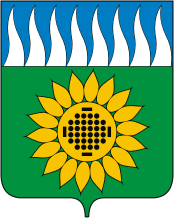
- Flag Coat of arms
- Interactive map of Zarechny
- Location of Zarechny Zarechny (Sverdlovsk Oblast)
- Coordinates: 56°49′N 61°20′E
- Country: Russia
- Federal subject: Sverdlovsk Oblast
- Founded: 1955
- Town status since: 1992

Area
  - Total: 299.27 km^{2} (115.55 sq mi)
- Elevation: 240 m (790 ft)

Population (2010 Census)
  - Total: 26,820
  - Estimate (2025): 28,230 (+5.3%)
  - Density: 89.62/km^{2} (232.1/sq mi)

Administrative status
  - Subordinated to: Town of Zarechny
  - Capital of: Town of Zarechny

Municipal status
  - Urban okrug: Zarechny Urban Okrug
  - Capital of: Zarechny Urban Okrug
- Time zone: UTC+5 (MSK+2)
- Postal code: 624250
- Dialing code: +7 34377
- OKTMO ID: 65737000001

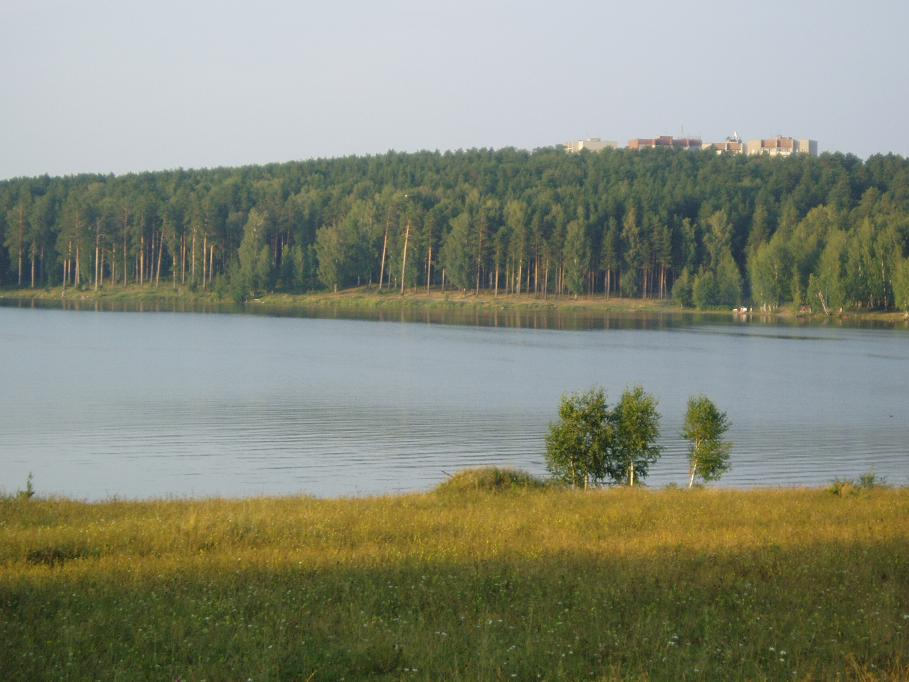
View of Zarechny over the lake

Zarechny (Russian: Заре́чный) is a town in Sverdlovsk Oblast, Russia, located on the Pyshma River east of Yekaterinburg. Population: 26,820 (2010 census); 27,914 (2002 census); 27,675 (1989 Soviet census).

== History ==
It was granted urban-type settlement status in 1957; town status was granted in 1992.

== Administrative and municipal status ==
Within the framework of the administrative divisions, it is, together with four rural localities, incorporated as the Town of Zarechny—an administrative unit with the status equal to that of the districts. As a municipal division, the Town of Zarechny is incorporated as Zarechny Urban Okrug.

== Economy ==
Zarechny is set in a forested region, and also is the site of the Beloyarsk nuclear power station. The site a 600 MW sodium-cooled fast breeder reactor. There are plans for an 800 MW reactor and there are two older reactors that have been decommissioned. There is also a 15 MW reactor used for research and collaboration with several international partners.
The power station is also connected to a number of cultural events, and hosted a folk festival in 2008. A Zarechny woman Tatiana Vdovina also came third in the Miss Atom 2008 beauty contest.

Zarechny is home of the martial arts club "Desantnik", which is based opposite the memorial to soldiers fallen in modern wars.
