= Miss Atomic (pageants) =

1950s showgirl title

Miss Atomic was a designation given to several showgirls in the United States, generally in Nevada in the 1950s, to promote nuclear tourism in the city of Las Vegas and to capitalize on the imagery of the Atomic Age.

== The "Miss Atomics" ==
The pageants were "inspired by the cultural phenomena, Las Vegas decided to combine two of its major attractions—nuclear bombs and showgirls—into a beauty contest". There were only four "showgirl-turned-beauty-queens" and "there was no single Miss Atomic Bomb beauty pageant, and most of the queens were simply showgirls chosen for their radiant ... looks". "The queens came about in an only loosely related manner: atomic-themed, usually of the mushroom cloud variety, costumes."

- The first atomic pin-up girl, Candyce King, appeared on May 9, 1952, in the Evening Telegraph (Dixon, Illinois) and the Day Record (Statesville, North Carolina) papers as "Miss Atomic Blast".
- In the spring of 1953, the city of North Las Vegas chose Paula Harris as Miss North Las Vegas of 1953 and gave her the nickname "Miss A-Bomb".
- In 1955, Operation Cue drew attention when it was delayed multiple times because of high winds and was nicknamed "Operation Mis-Cue." Linda Lawson was crowned "Miss Cue" on May 1, 1955. The title was "to illustrate another mis-firing of the Operation Cue Bomb." Lawson's "crown" was a mushroom cloud.
- The last and most famous was Lee A. Merlin (real name Anna Lee Mahoney), who was dubbed "Miss Atomic Bomb". Mahoney was the lead dancer at the Copa showroom of the Sands Hotel in 1957, when she was photographed by Don English of the Las Vegas Sun as part of a promotional ad for atomic tourism coinciding with Operation Plumbbob. The popular photograph, depicting Mahoney wearing a cotton mushroom cloud on the front of her swimsuit, was distributed nationally and she was coined "Miss Atomic".

== In popular culture ==
Several references to the Atomic pageants have appeared in various media over the years.

- In October 2012, the Las Vegas-based rock band, the Killers, released the song "Miss Atomic Bomb".
- The stage musical Miss Atomic Bomb, set in 1950s America at the time of nuclear testing, ran from March 7 to April 9, 2016, at London's St. James Theatre. It was written by Adam Long, Gabriel Vick and Alex Jackson-Long and starred Catherine Tate, Simon Lipkin, Dean John-Wilson, Daniel Boys and Florence Andrews. The show received poor reviews from critics, including a one-star review from The Stage.
- In Michael Mann's 1960s-set police drama Crime Story, in one of the later episodes, the photograph of Lee A. Merlin, as Miss Atom Bomb, shows up in the background in the bar patronized by the detectives.

== See also ==
- Miss Atom
