= Minuteman Missile National Historic Site =

Historic missile site in South Dakota, U.S.

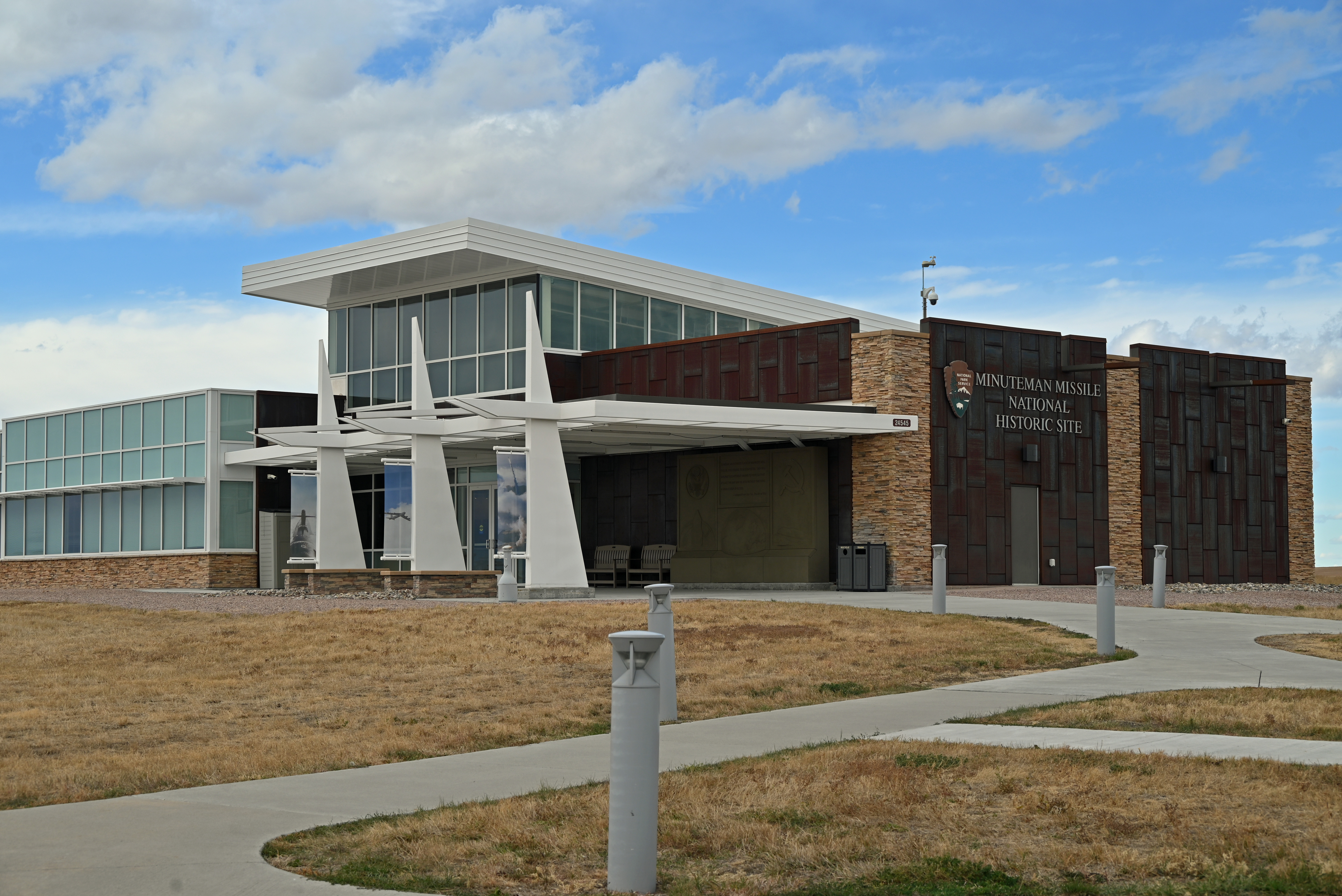
- Visitor Center in 2022

- Location within South Dakota Location within the United States
- Location: Jackson County and Pennington County, South Dakota, U.S.
- Nearest city: Wall, South Dakota
- Coordinates: 43°55′52″N 102°09′38″W
- Area: 43.8 acres (17.7 ha)
- Established: November 29, 1999
- Visitors: 98,908 (in 2020)
- Governing body: National Park Service
- Website: Minuteman Missile National Historical Site
- Minuteman Missile National Historic Site
- U.S. National Register of Historic Places
- U.S. National Historic Site
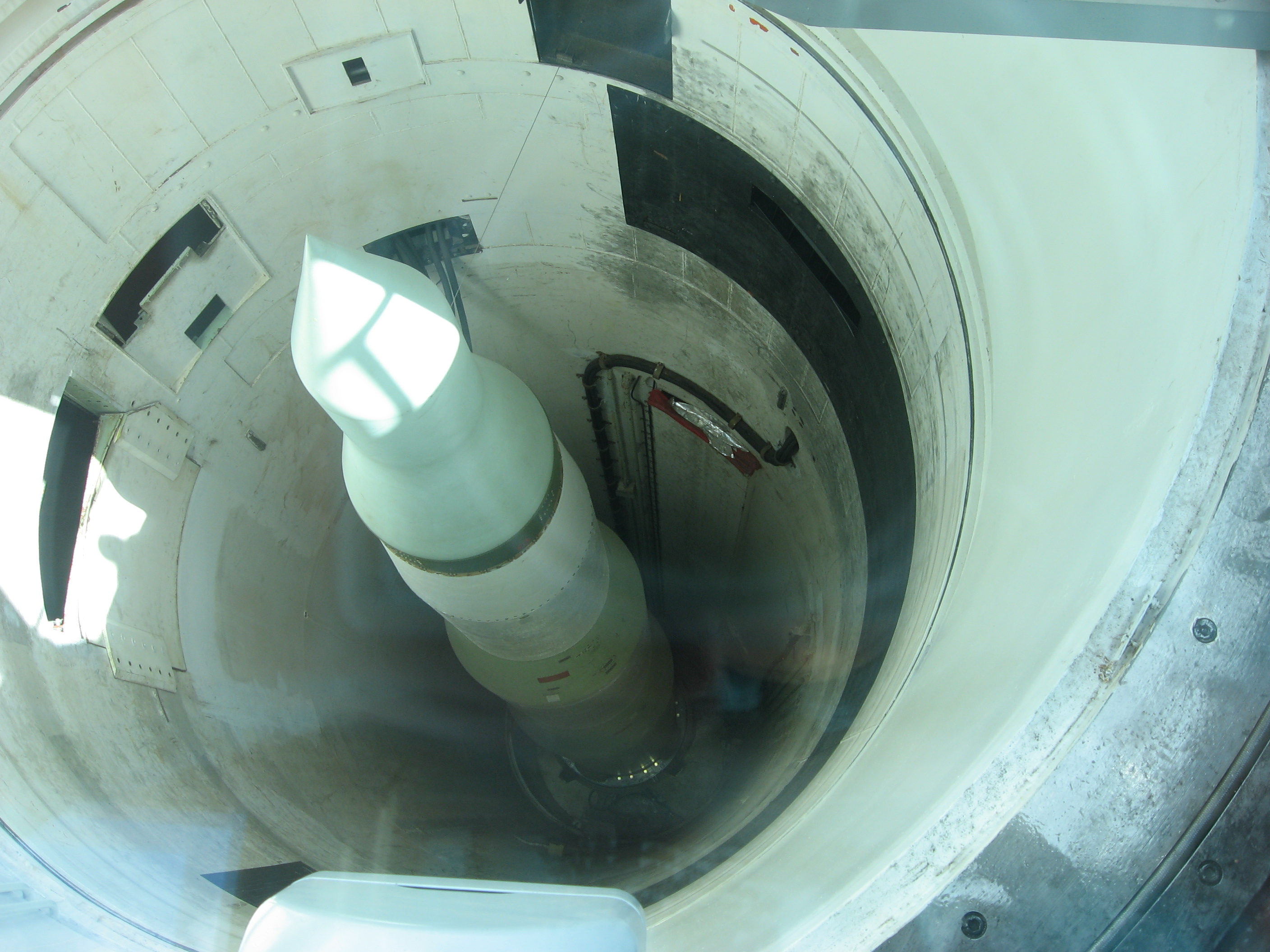
- A view of the silo from above
- Area: 1.6 acres (0.65 ha)
- NRHP reference No.: 01000275
- Added to NRHP: November 29, 1999

The Minuteman Missile National Historic Site is an American national historic site established in 1999 near Wall, South Dakota, to illustrate the history and significance of the Cold War, the nuclear arms race, and intercontinental ballistic missile (ICBM) development. The site preserves the last intact Minuteman II ICBM system in the United States, in a disarmed and demilitarized status. Guided tours are available of the underground Launch Control Center, and a missile silo can be observed from above. Some 450 of the newer Minuteman III missiles are still on active duty at Malmstrom AFB, Montana, Minot AFB, North Dakota, and F. E. Warren AFB, Wyoming.

== Facilities ==
This national historic site consists of three facilities: a visitor center and two significant Cold War-era sites; a launch control center; and a missile silo/launch facility, formerly operated by the 66th Strategic Missile Squadron of the 44th Strategic Missile Wing, headquartered at Ellsworth Air Force Base in Box Elder, near Rapid City. The facilities represent the only remaining intact components of a nuclear missile field that once consisted of 150 Minuteman II missiles, 15 launch-control centers, and covered over 13,500 square miles (35,000 km^{2}) of southwestern South Dakota.

The silo, known as launch facility Delta Nine (D-09) was constructed in 1963. It occupies 1.6 acres (6,000 m^{2}) nearly one-half mile (800 m) southwest of Interstate 90 at Exit 116 and six miles (9.7 km) from the town of Wall, South Dakota, in eastern Pennington County. It consists of an underground launch tube ("missile silo") 12 feet (3.7 m) in diameter and 80 feet (24.4 m) deep, made of reinforced concrete with a steel-plate liner. An unarmed missile is on display inside. The launch tube's 90-ton cover has been rolled partly away and welded to the rails it rides on. The launch tube was then covered with a glass viewing enclosure. Not only does this permit visitors to see the missile, it enables Russian satellites to verify that the site is not operational, and hence in compliance with the Strategic Arms Reduction Treaty. Because the only way to get to the underground part of the site is by a ladder 30 feet (9.1 m) long, tours are not conducted underground for safety reasons. Visitors can conduct self-guided tours of the site during the day by calling a number on their cell phones and walking around the site, listening to the description of various points over the phone.

The launch control facility, known as Delta One (D-01), is about 10.5 miles (16.9 km) away, to the east-southeast in northwestern Jackson County. It occupies approximately six acres (24,000 m^{2}) about 1.7 miles (2.7 km) north of I-90 at Exit 127. It consists of an above-ground building containing a kitchen, sleeping quarters, offices and life-support equipment. Below this building is the actual launch control center, buried 31 feet (9.4 m) deep, connected to the building by an elevator. Guided tours are conducted underground here, but are limited to six people at a time due to the very small underground launch control center ("capsule") and are a half-hour long. Self-guided tours are not possible here; the gate for the fence around D-01 is always locked, just like it was when it was an active launch control facility.

== History ==
The complex, one of six located in the central United States, was built as a deterrent to a nuclear first strike by the Soviet Union. By placing missiles underground in widely separated locations, it was hoped that regardless of the size of a Soviet missile attack, enough US missiles would survive to ensure devastation on the aggressor nation. The Minutemen in this complex remained on alert for nearly 30 years until the wing was inactivated following the signing of the Strategic Arms Reduction Treaty (START) by President George Bush and Soviet leader Mikhail Gorbachev in 1991. Under the terms of the treaty, the missiles in this complex were removed from their silos, and in 1994 the 44th Missile Wing was inactivated. All sites in the complex, except D-01 and D-09, have been destroyed.

D-01 and D-09 were candidates for becoming a national historic site because they were both close to a major road (Interstate 90) and to existing recreational facilities (namely, Badlands National Park and Mount Rushmore). As with all sites in the 44th Strategic Missile Wing, both had seen limited modification since they were built in the 1960s.

The Minuteman Missile National Historic Site Boundary Modification Act (S. 459; 113th Congress) added about 29 acres (12 ha) of land to the park in 2013, tripling its size to include a visitor facility. Most of it was transferred from the adjacent Buffalo Gap National Grassland.

== Gallery ==
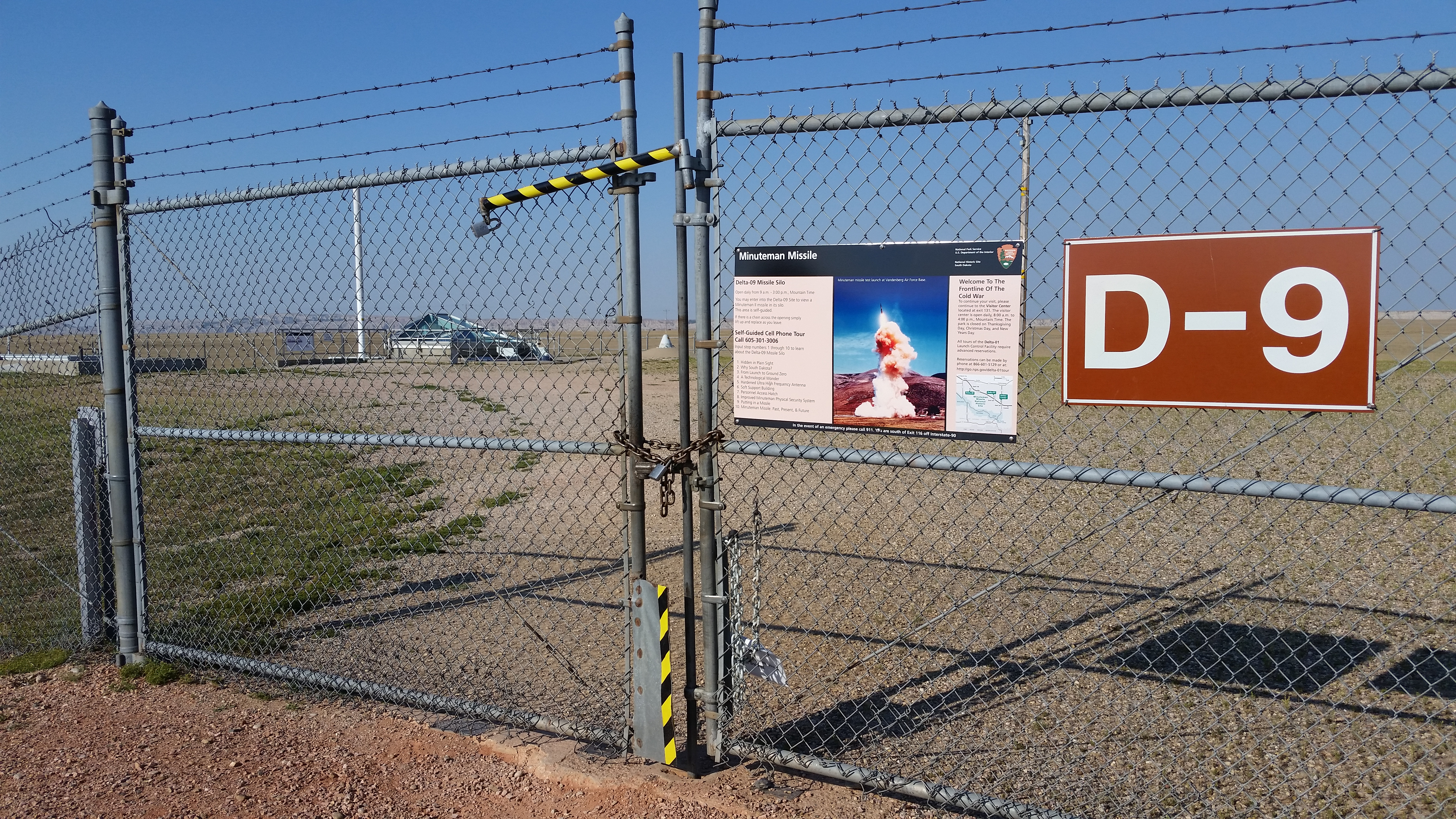
D-9 silo

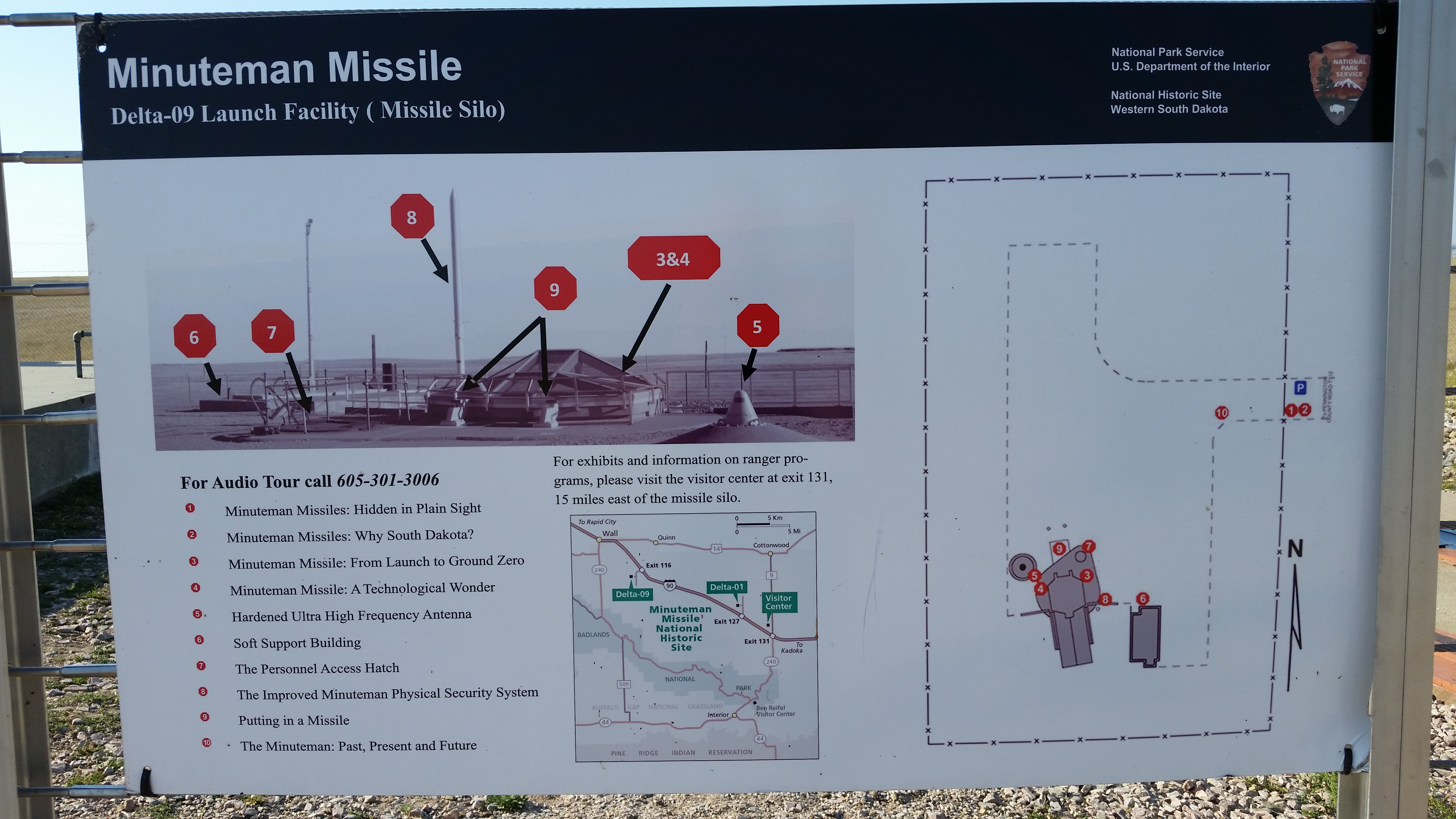
D-9 silo map

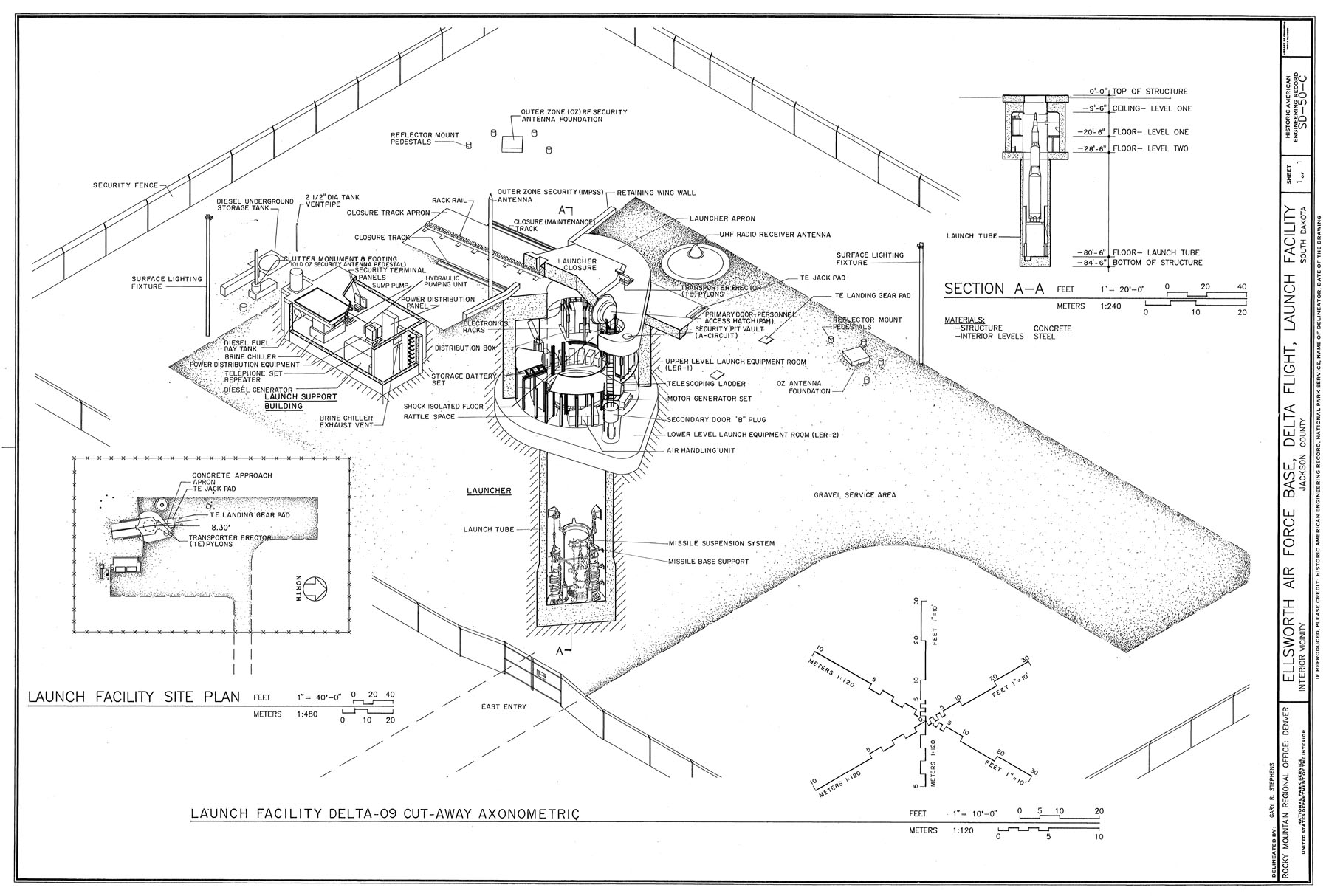
D-9 Axonometric Site Plan

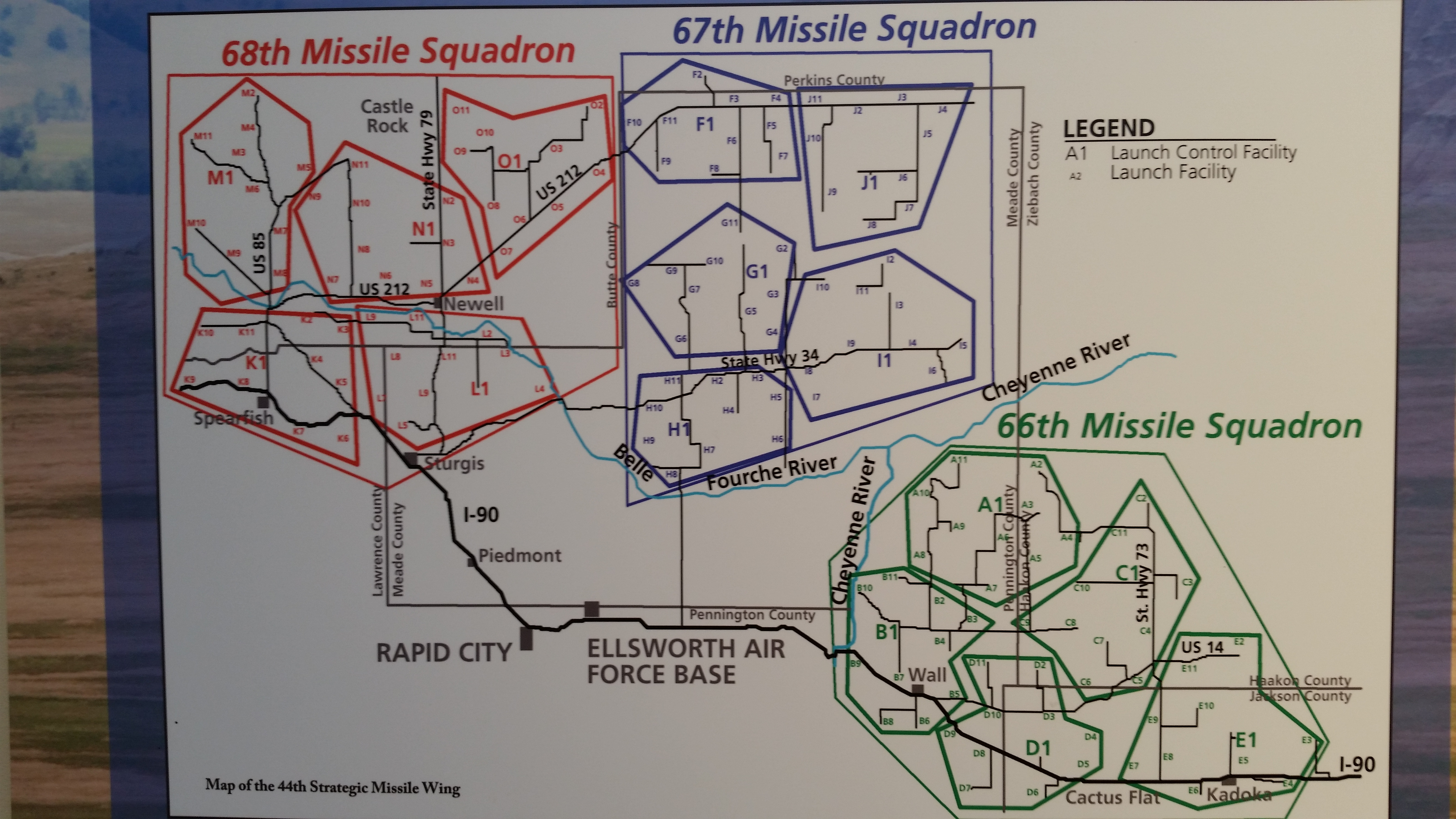
44th Strategic Missile Wing squadron silo locations

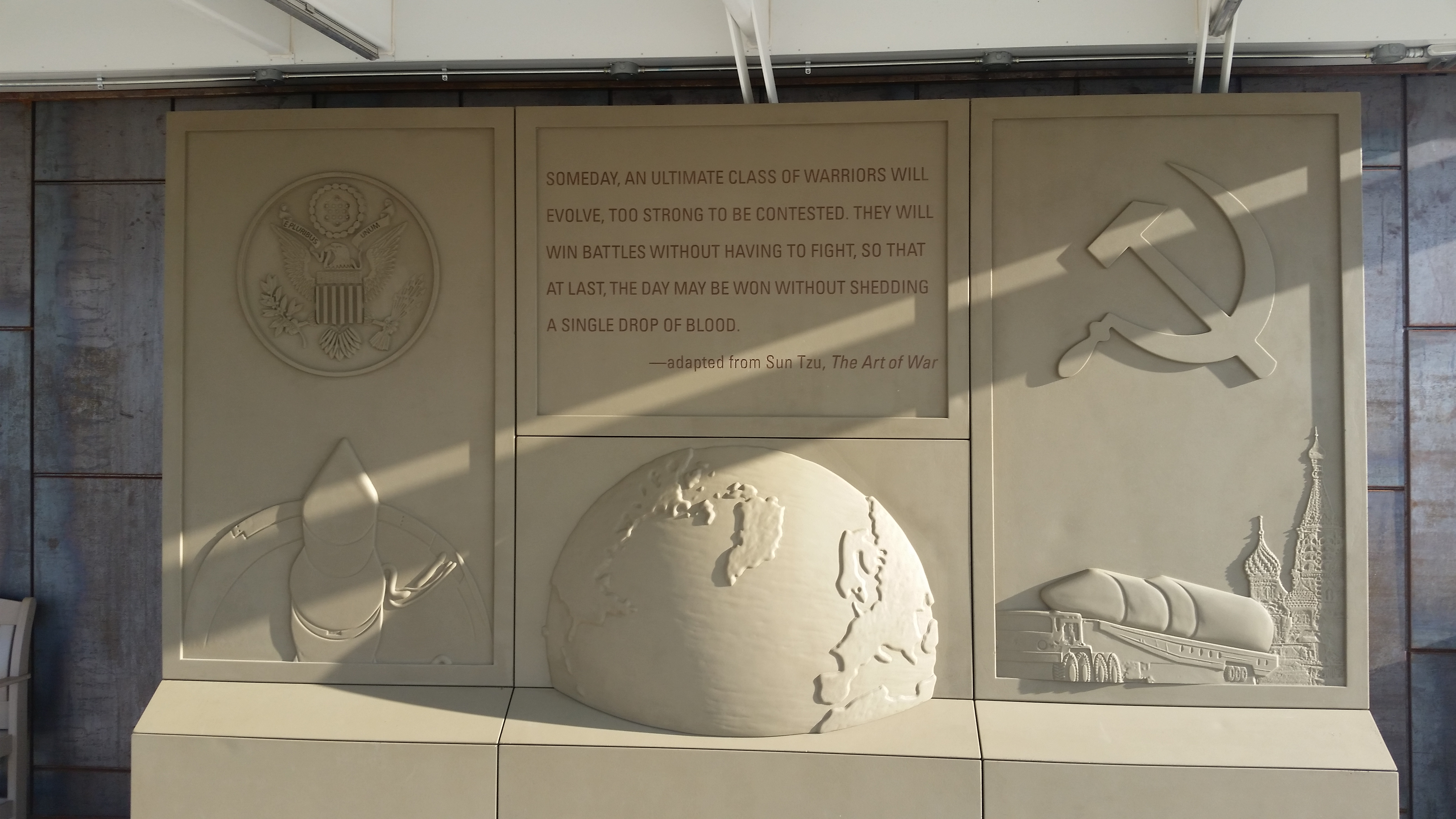
Quote by Sun Tzu

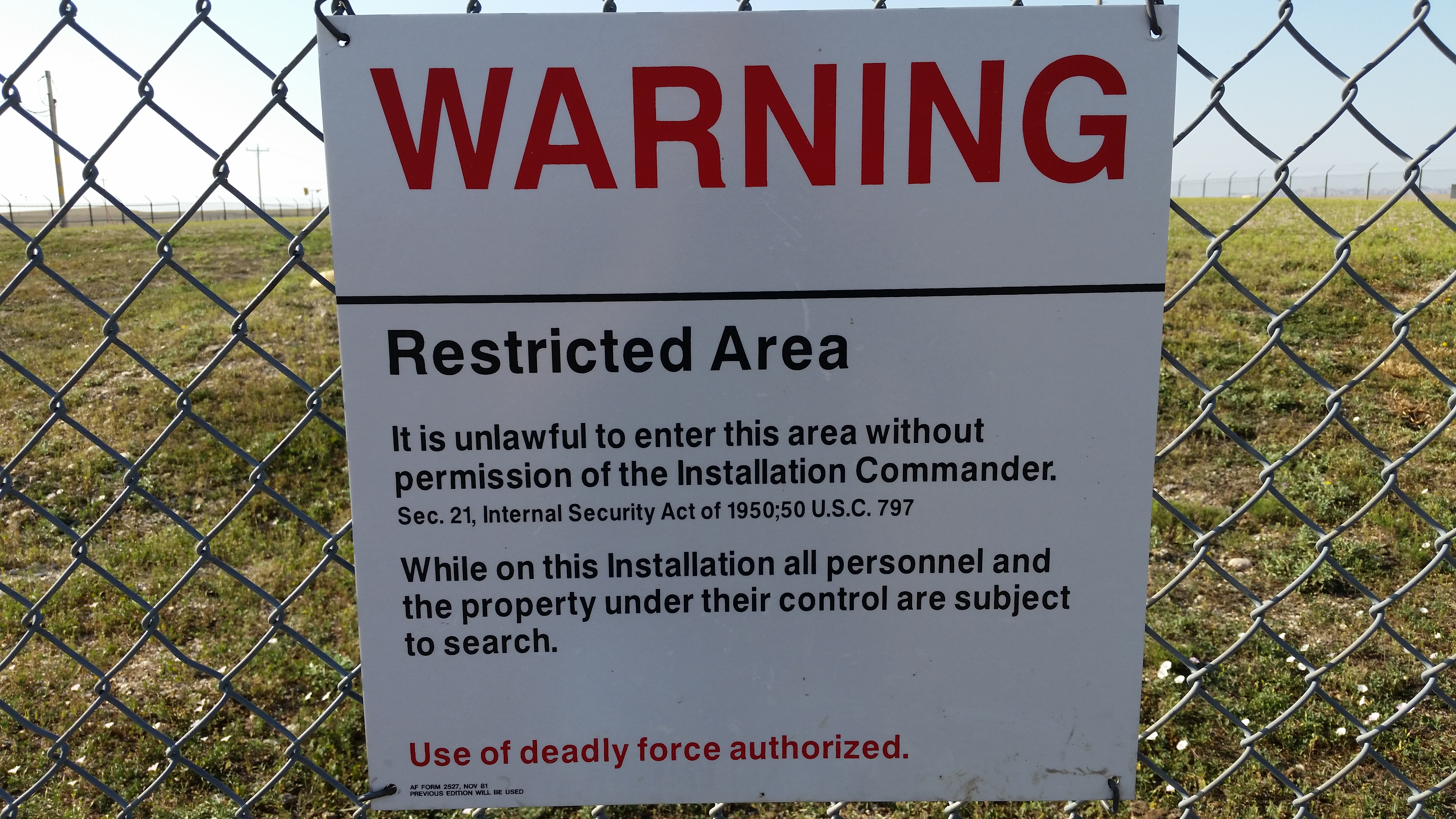
Warning sign

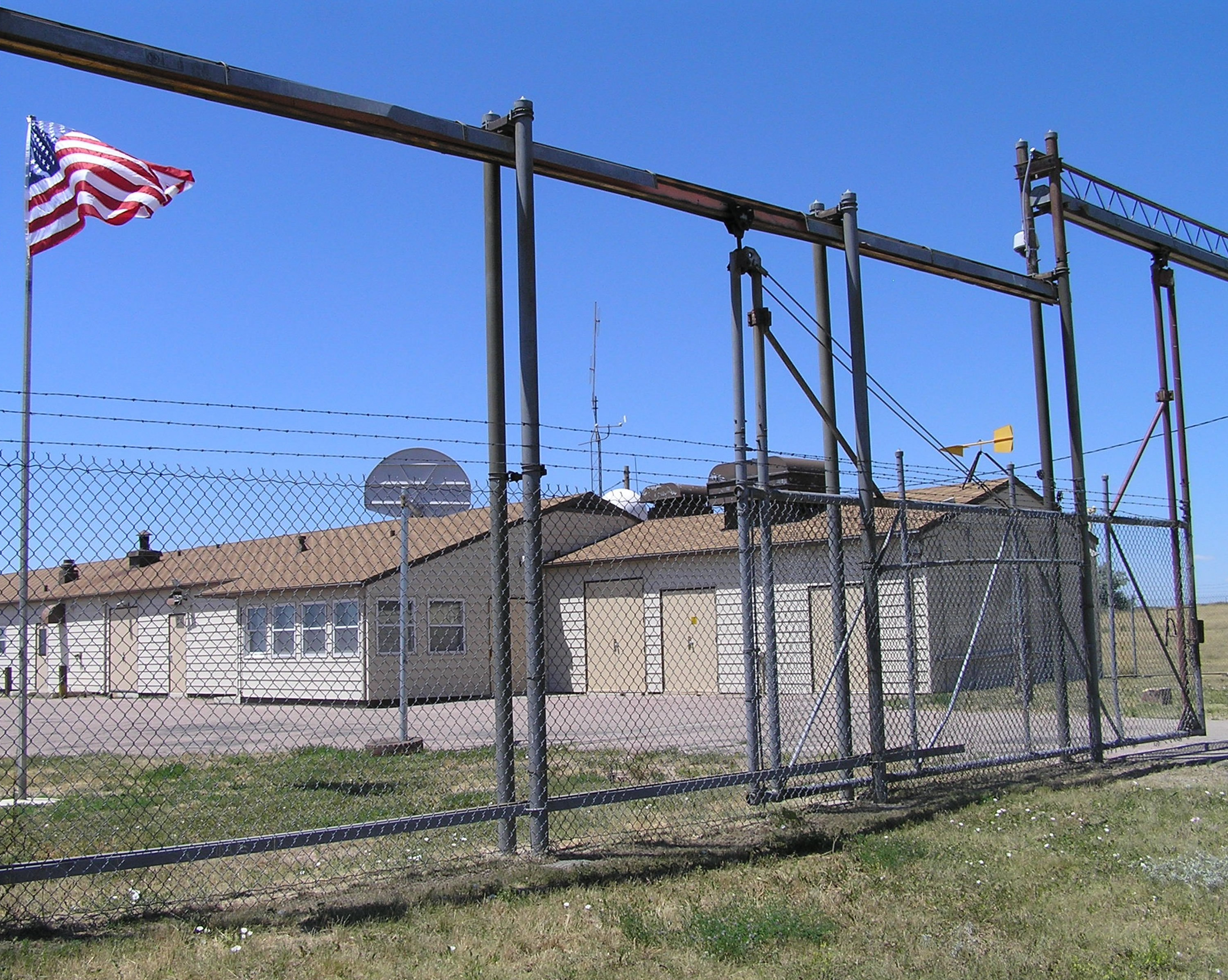
Entry gate to the Delta-01 launch control facility

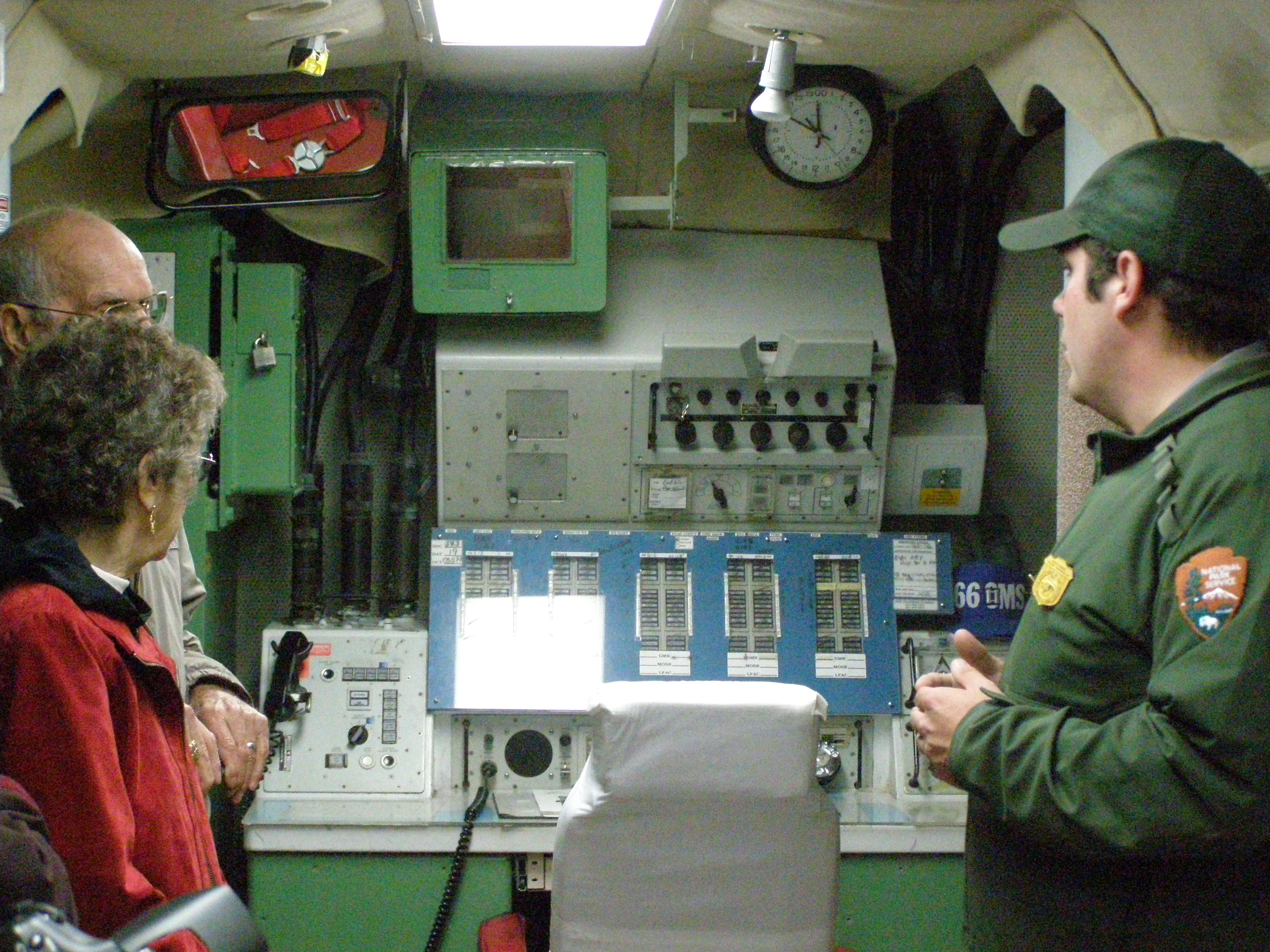
Control Room for Delta Flight Launch facility

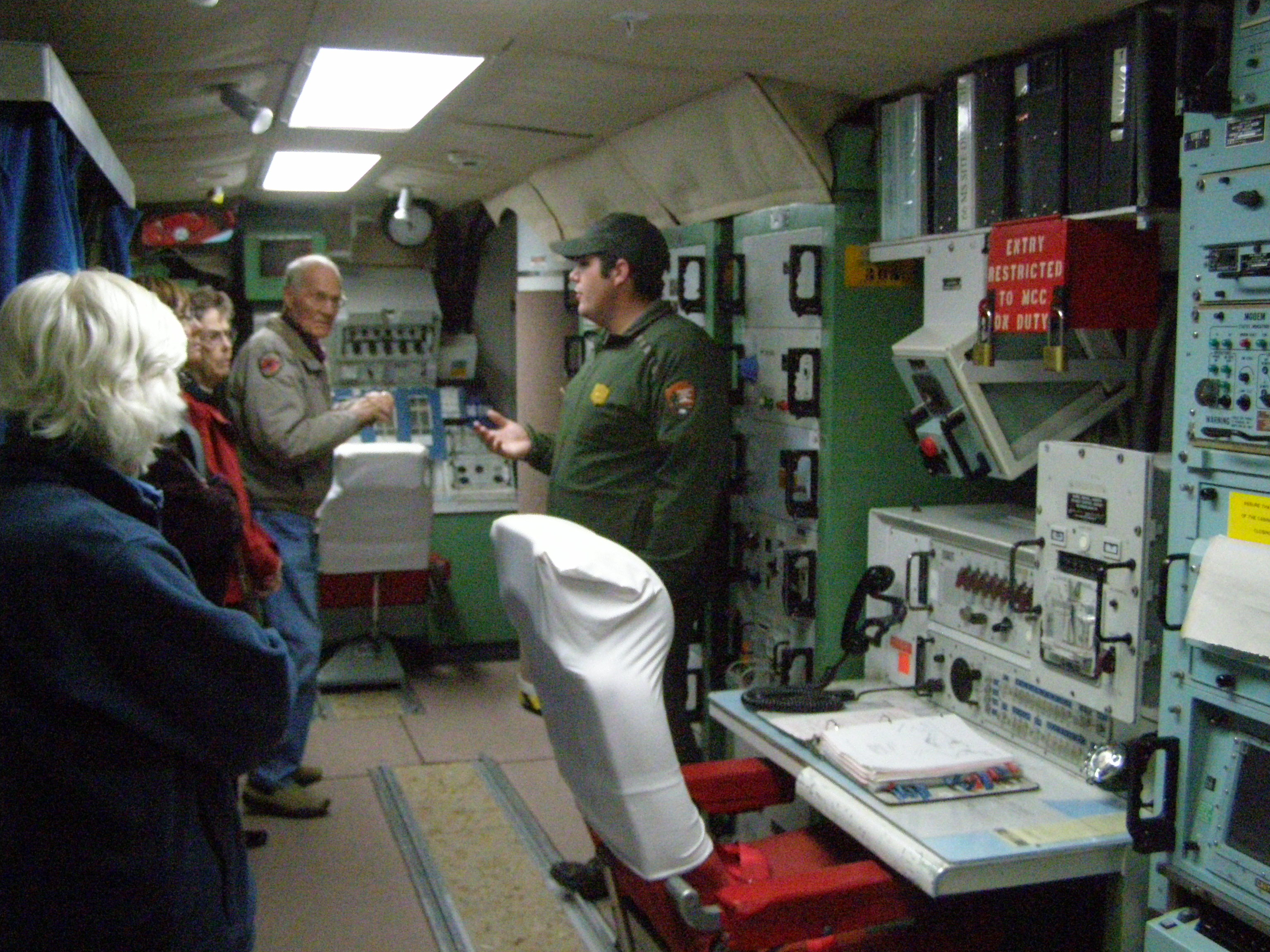
Interior of the command module for Delta Flight

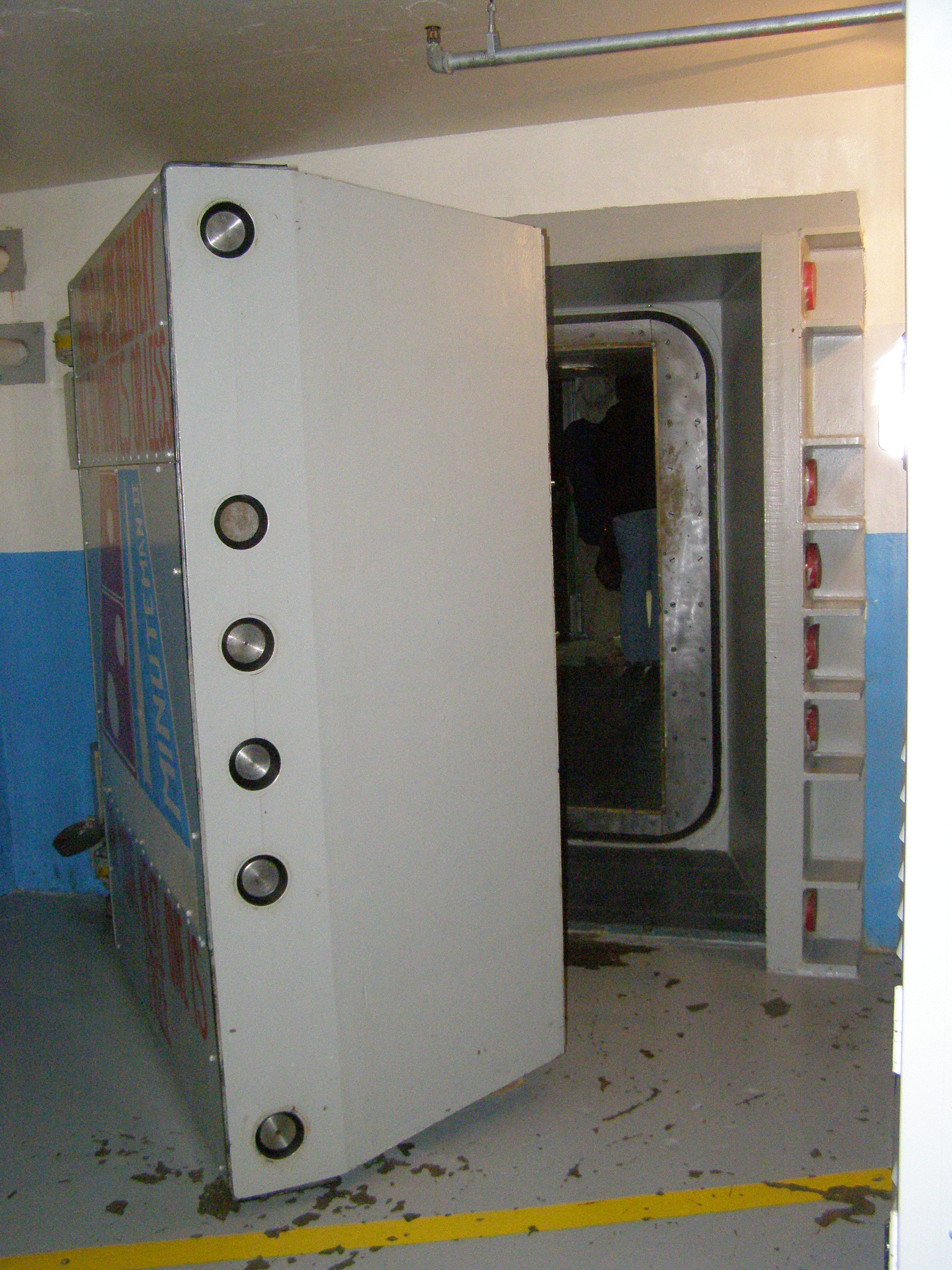
Blast door

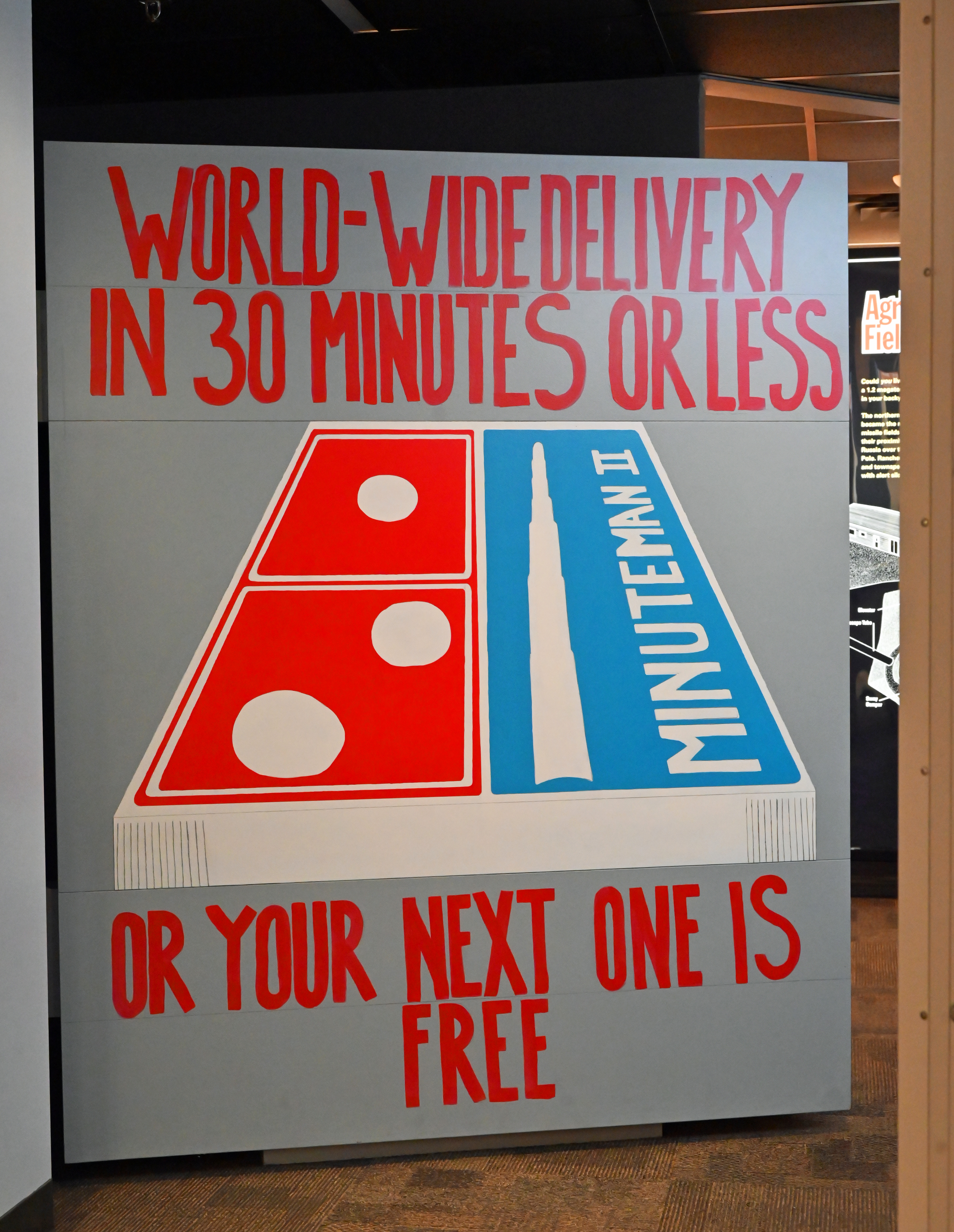
Blast door, front

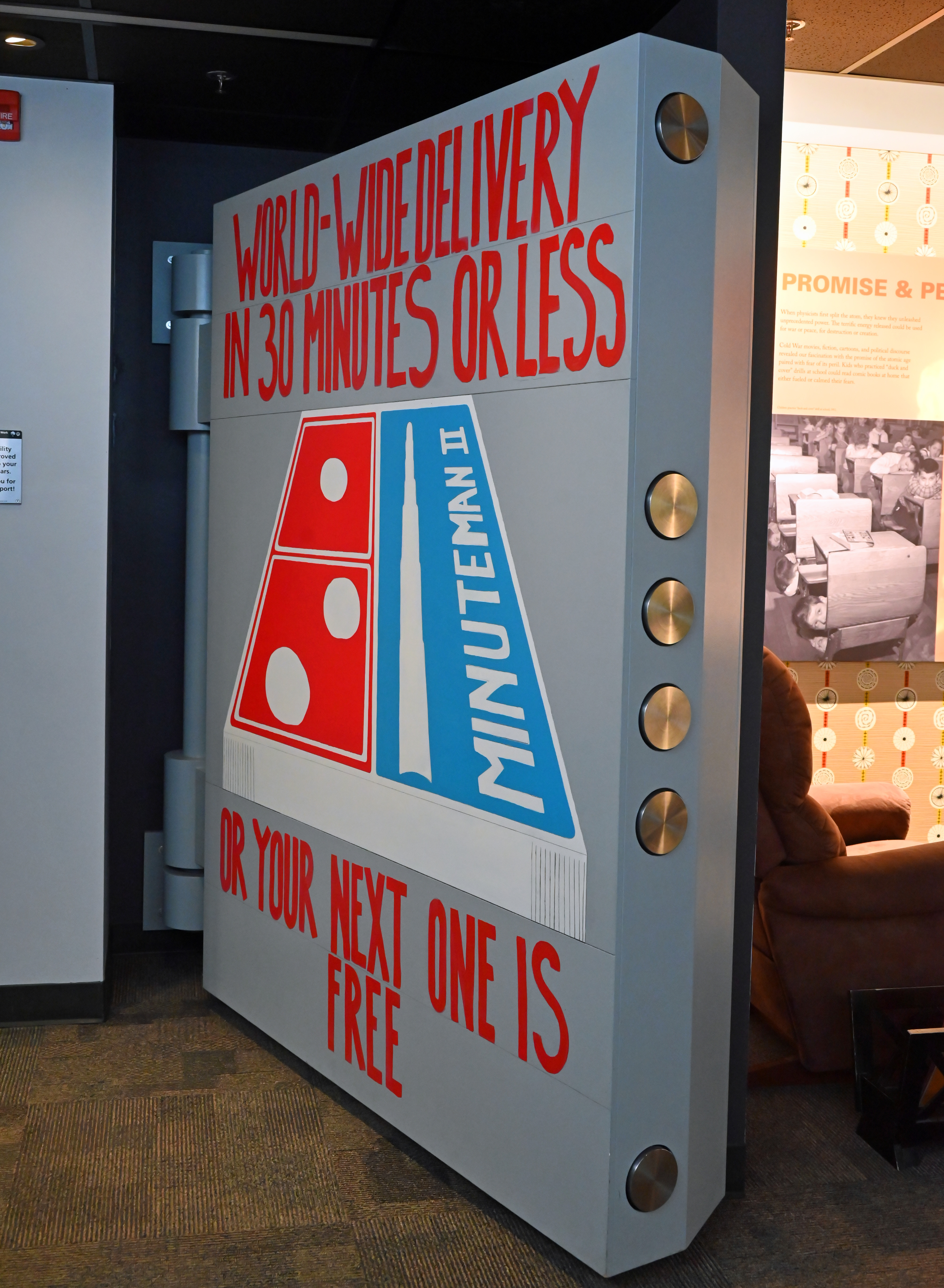
Blast door, edge view

== See also ==
- List of museums in South Dakota
- Ronald Reagan Minuteman Missile State Historic Site
- Titan Missile Museum
- Quebec-One Missile Alert Facility
- Strategic Air and Space Museum – Museum collection includes Minuteman II, Minuteman III, and Titan II re-entry vehicle shrouds and launch control systems on display.
- Strategic missile forces museum in Ukraine – Similar museum in the former Soviet Union
- Plokštinė missile base site of the Cold War Museum
