= Miss Atom =

Miss Atom (Cyrillic: Мисс Атом) was a beauty contest open to women in Russia's and former USSR countries nuclear industry and students in nuclear-related subjects between 18 and 35 years old; with about 400 participants in 2009 and sponsored by Atomenergoprom.

The competition was run annually from 2004 until 2011. The winners were announced on the eve of International Women's Day, an important Russian holiday. The prizes was goods prizes and not in cash because "cash is such a crude form of reward".

== Winners ==
- Miss Atom 2011 was won by Marina Kiriy – the runner up was Viktoriya Guseva, and in third place was Tatyana Ladyka.
- Miss Atom 2010 was won by Olga Trefilova – the runner up was Kristina Pogosyan, and in third place was Yekaterina Ivanova.
- Miss Atom 2009 was won by Jekaterina Bulhakowa (95-69-97) – the runner up was Olga Golicyna (83– 65–98), and in third place was Aliona Kirsanowa (87-60-87).
- Miss Atom 2008 was won by Julia Nagayeva (88-63-90) – the runner up was Asel Utibayeva (89-61-91), and in third place was Tatiana Vinovna (90-60-90).
- Miss Atom 2007 was won by Elena Kamenskaya (88-62-85) – the runner up was Anastasia Pletneva (94-63-95), and in third place was Tatiana Rodnyk (84-59-88).
- Miss Atom 2006 was won tied by Elena Aksyonova (85-62-92) and Yuliya Veselova (92-63-90) – the runner up in third place was Oksana Oskolkova (90-61-91).
- Miss Atom 2005 was won by Mariya Burkova (89-60-89) – in second place was Yuliya Nagayeva (88-61-90), and third was Mariya Ganina (90-67-93).
- Miss Atom 2004 was won by Tamara Serova (87-62-90) – in second place was Olga Smirnova (93-60-92), and third was Mariya Ptitsina (88-62-94).

== See also ==
- Miss Atomic (pageants)
