= Titan Missile Museum =

NHL site in Pima County, Arizona

- Air Force Facility Missile Site 8 (571-7) Military Reservation
- U.S. National Register of Historic Places
- U.S. National Historic Landmark
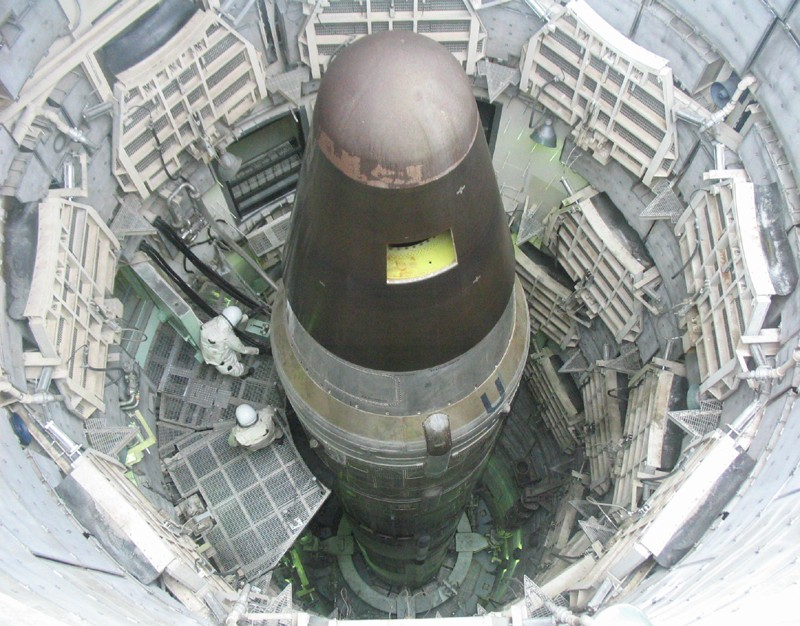
- An ICBM loaded into the silo of the Titan Missile Museum, with a hole cut into the side of the nose cone to show that the weapon is inert.

- Location within Arizona Location within the United States
- Location: 1580 West Duval Mine Road; Sahuarita, Arizona
- Coordinates: 31°54′11″N 110°59′55″W
- Built: 1963
- Architect: Ralph M Parson Co.
- NRHP reference No.: 92001234

Significant dates
- Added to NRHP: December 3, 1992
- Designated NHL: April 19, 1994

The Titan Missile Museum, also known as Air Force Facility Missile Site 8 or as Titan II ICBM Site 571-7, is a former ICBM (intercontinental ballistic missile) site located about 40 km (25 mi) south of Tucson, Arizona, in the United States. It was constructed in 1963 and deactivated in 1982. The museum is run by the nonprofit Arizona Aerospace Foundation and includes an inert Titan II missile in the silo, as well as the original launch facilities.

It was declared a National Historic Landmark in 1994. It is the only operational Titan II complex to survive from the late Cold War period.

It remains as the only location in the country where visitors can view an entirely preserved ICBM.

== Underground facilities ==
The underground facilities consist of a three-level Launch Control Center, the eight level silo containing the missile and its related equipment, and the connecting structures of cableways (access tunnels), blast locks, and the access portal and equipment elevator. The complex was built of steel reinforced concrete with walls as much as 8-foot-thick (2.4 m) in some areas, and a number of 3-ton blast doors sealed the various areas from the surface and each other. Visitors are able to view the missile up close on level two of the silo on guided tours and from the surface above the silo. The remaining levels of the silo are not accessible during tours.

== Titan II missile ==
The 103-foot (31 m) Titan II missile inside the silo has neither warhead nor fuel, allowing it to be safely displayed to visitors. In accordance with a US/USSR agreement, the silo doors are permanently blocked from opening more than half way. The dummy reentry vehicle mounted on the missile has a prominent hole cut in it to prove it is inert. All the support facilities at the site remain intact, complete with all of their original equipment.

The silo became operational in 1963 and was deactivated in 1984 as part of President Reagan's policy (announced in 1981) of decommissioning the Titan II missiles as part of a weapon systems modernization program. All operational Titan II silos throughout the country were demolished, including 18 sites around McConnell AFB in Wichita, Kansas, 17 sites near Little Rock AFB, Arkansas (one additional site previously damaged beyond repair in a mishap/non-nuclear explosion) and 17 other sites by Davis-Monthan AFB and Tucson except for this one. It is now a National Historic Landmark.

== Yield and warhead ==
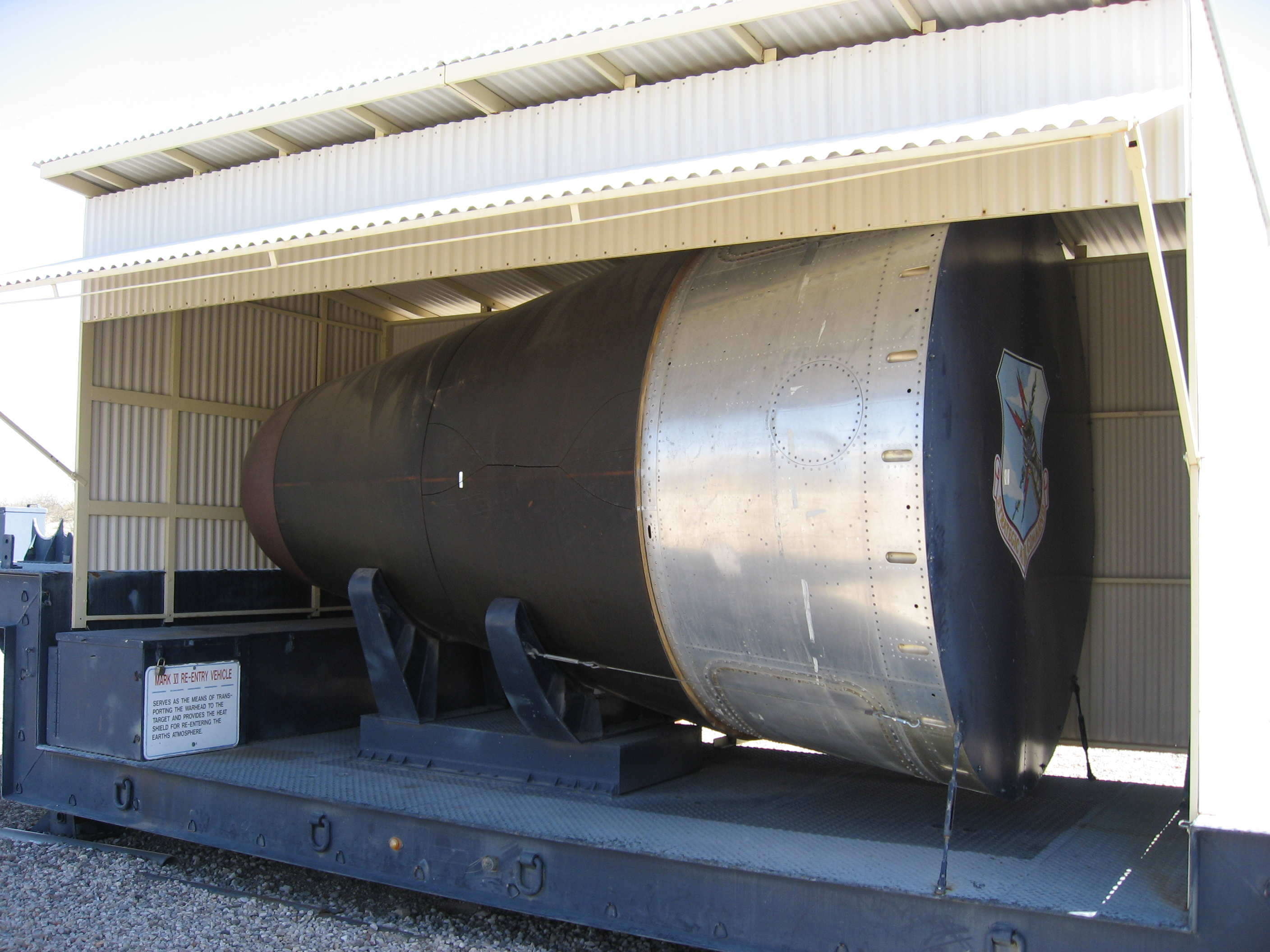
View of Titan Missile II re-entry vehicle (which housed the 9 megaton warhead)

The Titan II was the largest operational land based nuclear missile ever used by the United States. The missile had one W53 warhead with a yield of 9 Megatons (9,000 kilotons).

At launch, orders from the National Command Authority would have specified one of three pre-programmed targets which, for security reasons, were unknown to the crew. The missile base that is now the Titan Missile Museum (complex 571-7 of the 390th Strategic Missile Wing) was, at the time of closure, programmed to strike "Target Two". The missile's computer could hold up to three targets, and the target selected was determined by Strategic Air Command headquarters. To change the selected target, the crew commander pressed the appropriate button on the launch console. Target 2, which is classified to this day but was assumed to be within the borders of the former Soviet Union, was designated as a ground burst, suggesting that the target was a hardened facility such as a Soviet missile base. Targets could be selected for air or ground burst, but the selection was determined by Strategic Air Command.

== Tourist attractions ==
The Titan Missile Museum is located at 1580 West Duval Mine Road, Sahuarita, on I-19.

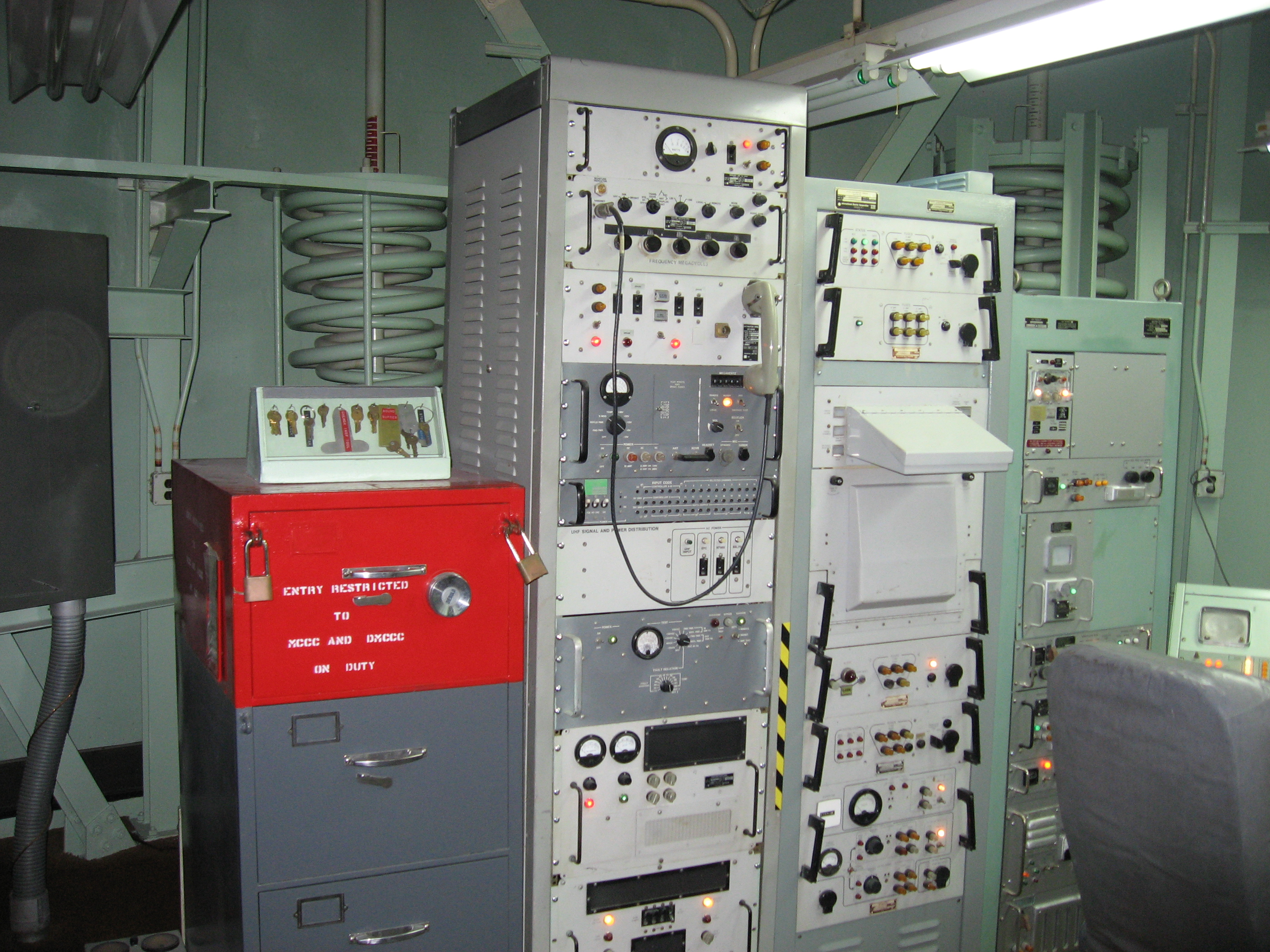
The cabinet the launch keys were locked in

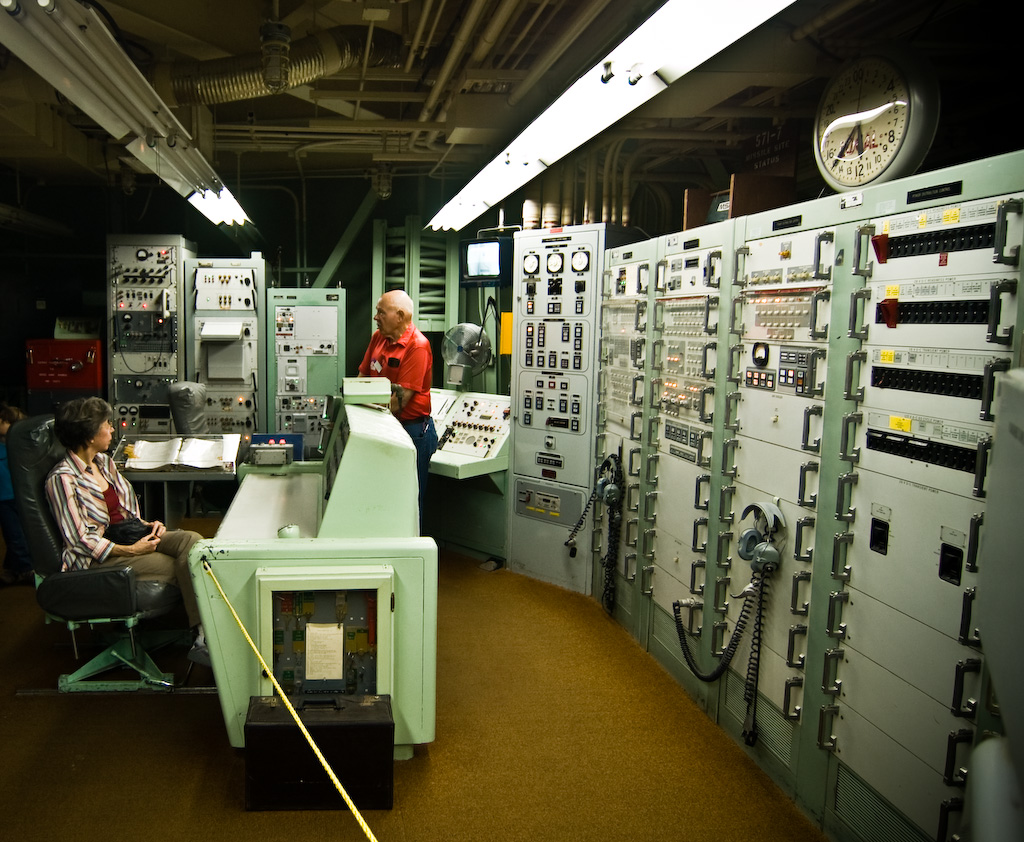
Overall view of control room and various pieces of launch equipment

A visitor center for the site features a gift shop, a small museum and guided tours of the site. The museum is intended to put the Titan II within the context of the Cold War. Paid tours are available for hire, offering education about the history of the Titan II site and program, as well as a closer look at many features of the complex. Relics include hardstands for fuel storage containers and the associated control vehicles, restored engines from a Titan II missile, and a re-entry vehicle.

Tours below ground may include the control room, the cableways (tunnels), the silo, antenna tower and more. More information can be found and reservations may be made via the museum website.

Several scenes in the 1996 film Star Trek: First Contact were shot at the site. The missile itself was depicted as the launch vehicle for the film's Phoenix spacecraft, the first warp prototype.

== Gallery ==
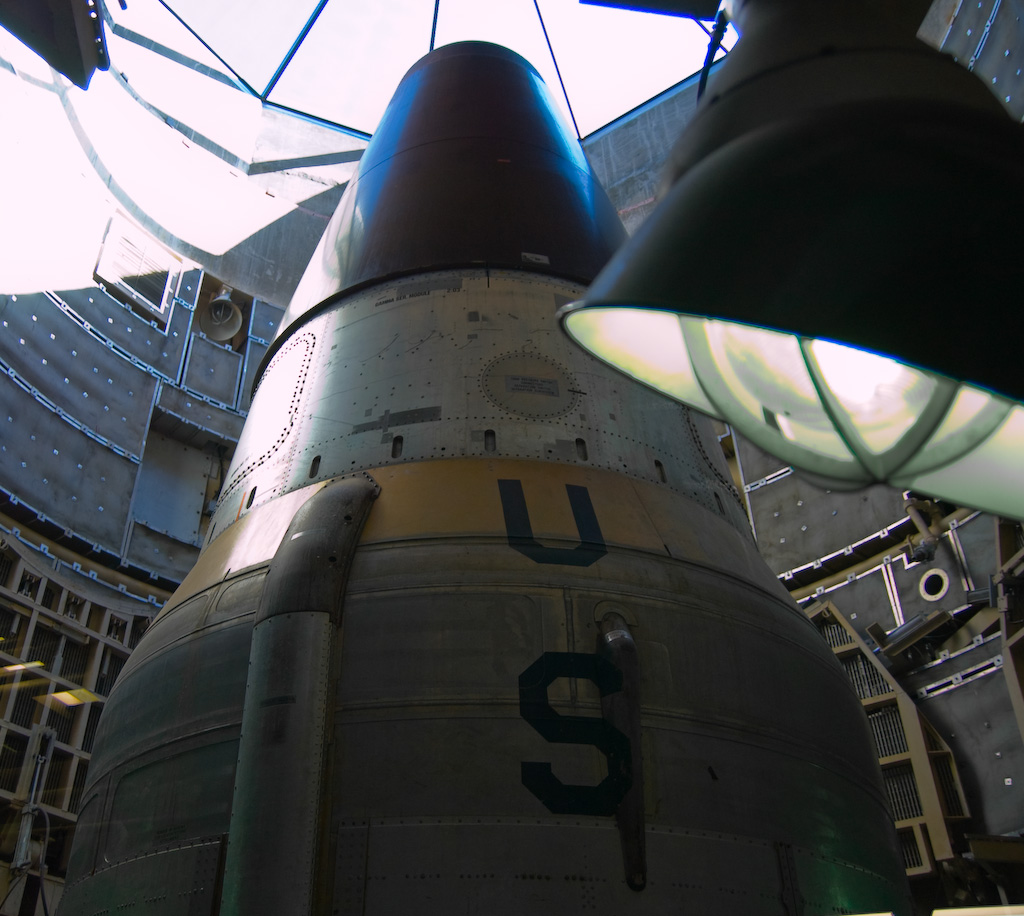
Warhead stage at top of missile in silo

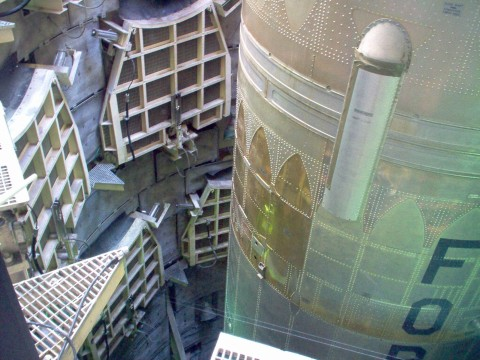
Side of missile in silo

Launch control center equipment

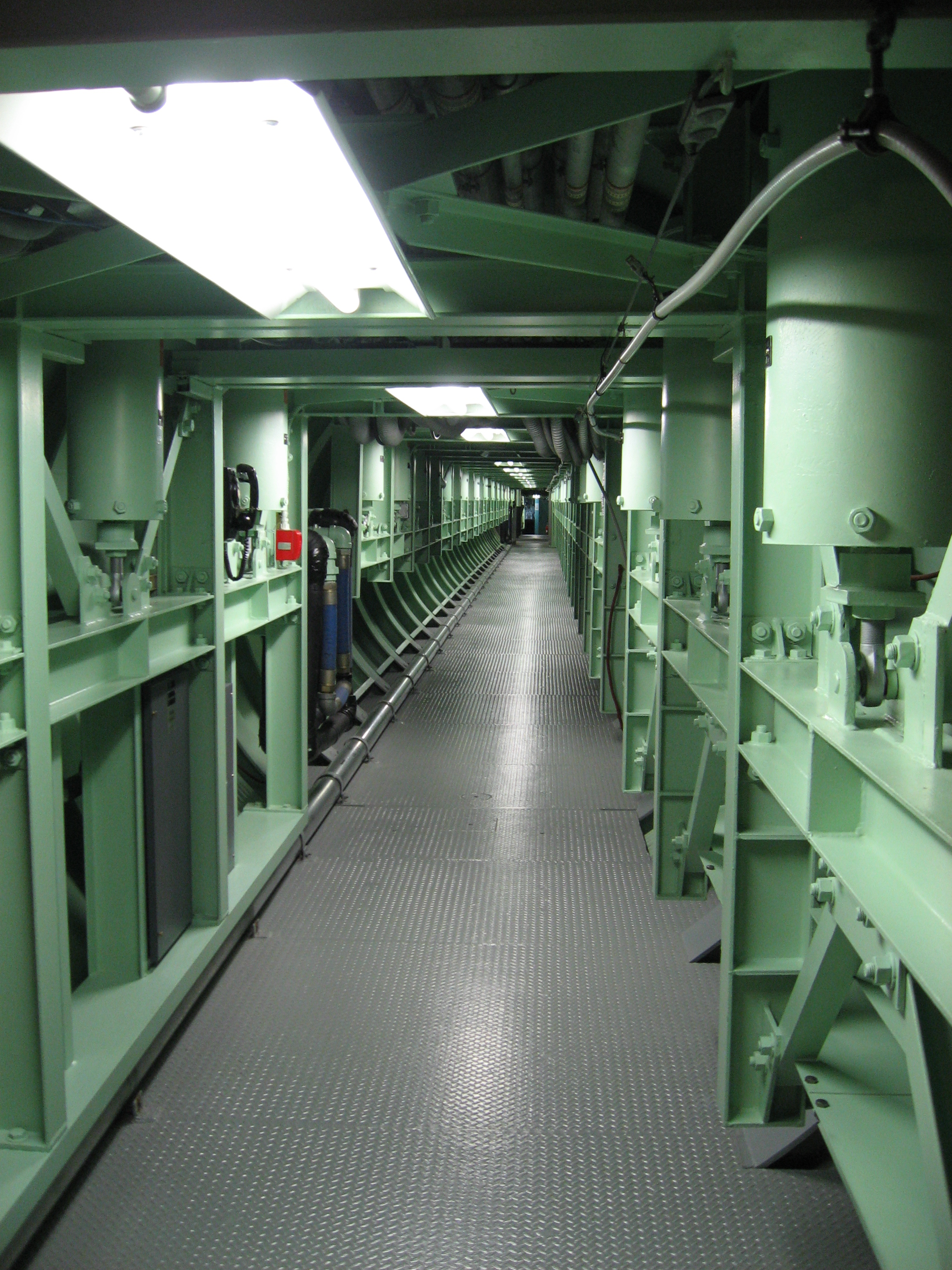
Long cableway

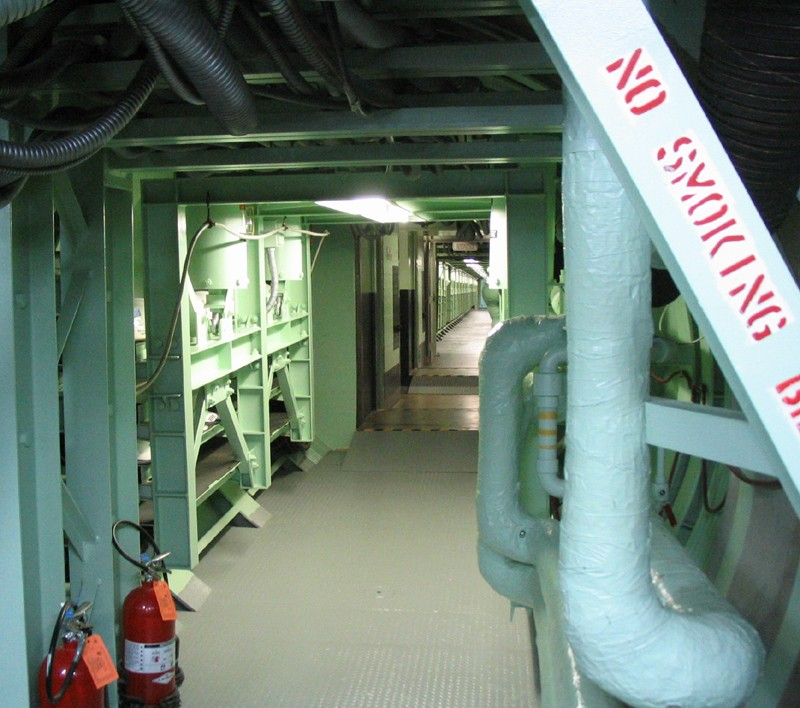
Short cableway

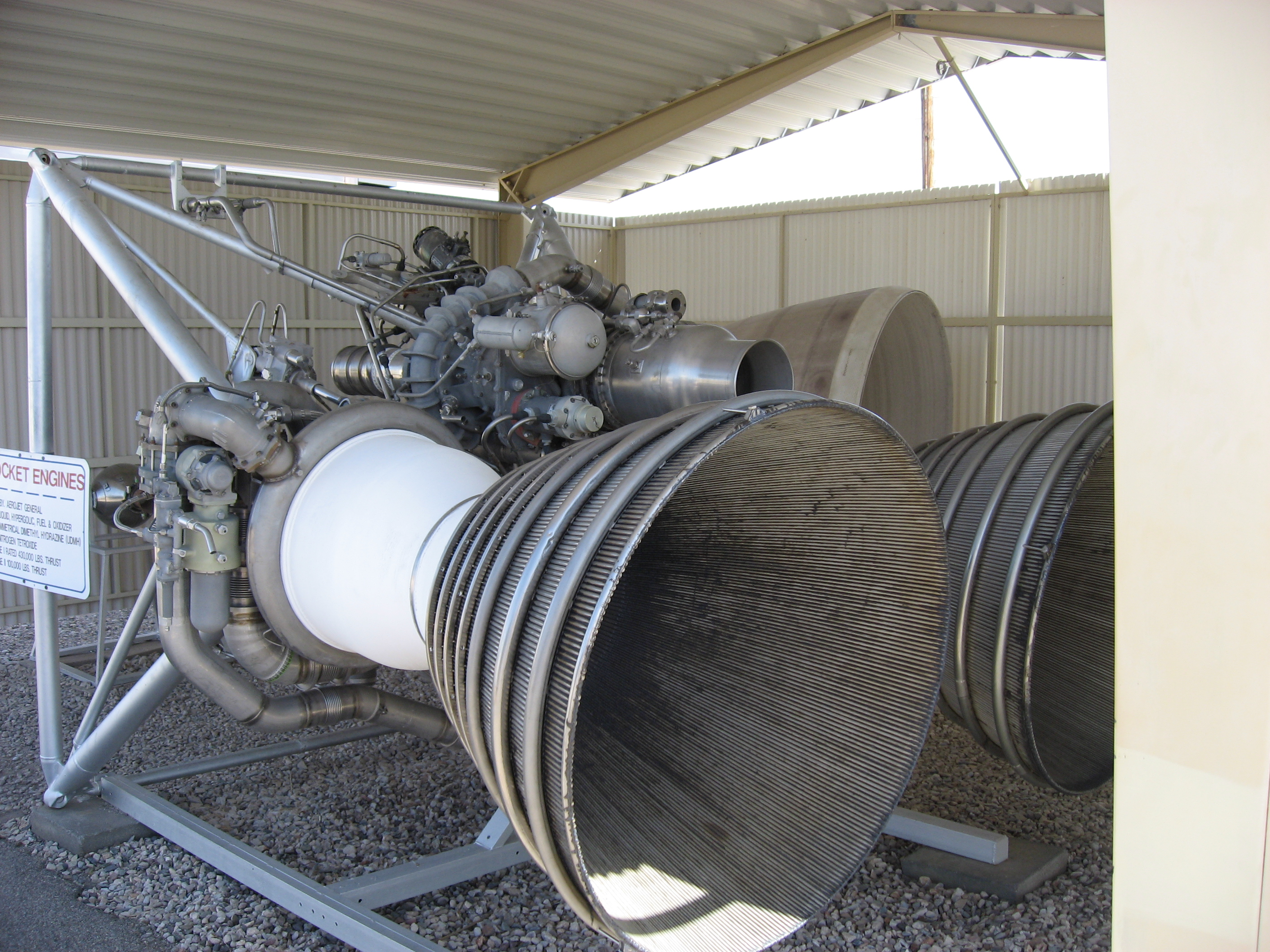
Missile first stage engine on grounds of the museum

== See also ==
- Missile launch facility
- Minuteman Missile National Historic Site
- Strategic missile forces museum in Ukraine – Similar museum in the former Soviet Union
- Plokštinė missile base site of the Cold War Museum
