= Strategic missile forces museum in Ukraine =

Museum in Ukraine

Coordinates: 48°11′12″N 30°39′55″E

The Strategic Missile Forces Museum in Ukraine (Ukrainian: Музей ракетних військ стратегічного призначення) is a military museum located near the town of Pobuzke (Побузьке), in Kirovohrad Oblast, Ukraine, about 250 kilometres (160 mi) south of Kyiv. It was built around the remains of a former underground Unified Command Post (UCP) for RT-23/SS-24 Molodets ICBM rockets.

== History ==
After the dissolution of the Soviet Union, Ukraine held about one-third of the Soviet nuclear arsenal, the third largest in the world at the time, as well as significant means of its design and production. 130 UR-100N/RS-18 intercontinental ballistic missiles (ICBM) with six warheads each, 46 RT-23 Molodets ICBMs with ten warheads apiece, as well as 33 heavy bombers, totalling approximately 1,700 warheads remained on Ukrainian territory. In 1994 Ukraine agreed to destroy the weapons, and to join the Treaty on the Non-Proliferation of Nuclear Weapons (NPT).

40 of the underground launch silos for the RT-23 ICBMs had been installed around the city of Pervomaisk in the Mykolaiv Oblast, the home of the 46th Rocket Division of the 43rd Rocket Army of the Soviet Strategic Rocket Forces. The individual silos were scattered across the general area and often located on fields, surrounded by a fence and guarded. A group of nine or ten silos was connected to a common, underground Unified Command Post staffed by several military officers.

After the Declaration of Independence of Ukraine, the country opted for denuclearization. Between 1994 and 1997 all the silos near Pervomaisk were de-alerted and the missiles returned to Russia. 30 of the 40 silos were destroyed with the help of foreign experts through the Nunn–Lugar Cooperative Threat Reduction program. One of the former Unified Command Posts near the town of Pobuzke was converted into the Strategic Missile Forces Museum on October 30, 2001, and is now part of the National Military History Museum in Kyiv.

== Exhibits ==
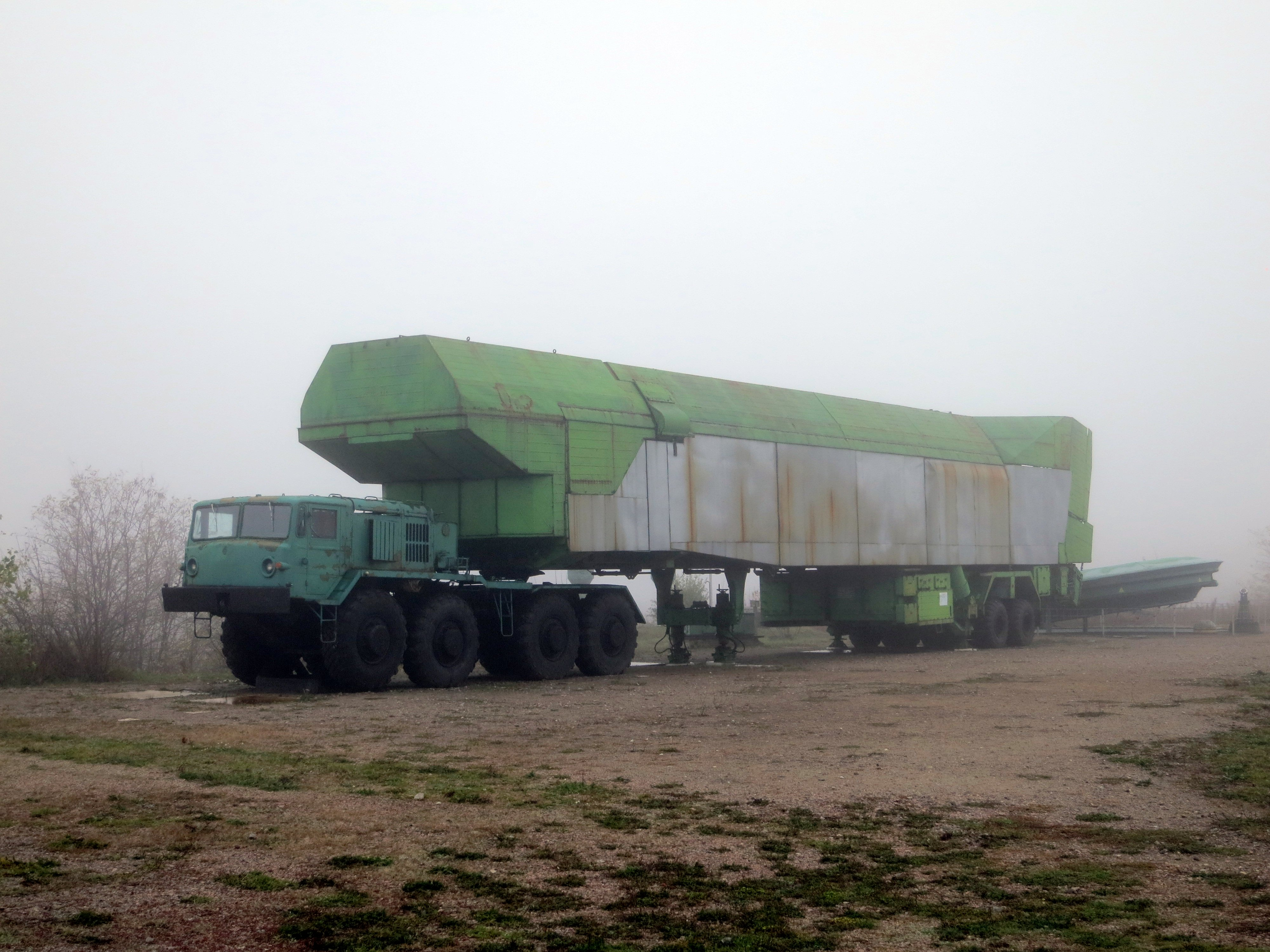
Ukraine Strategic Missile Forces Museum 03 (13503834443)

The museum consists of several parts:

- An indoor exhibit space (housed in the former administrative building) with exhibits ranging from World War I weapons to equipment from other Unified Command Posts, including mock-ups of a launch room and sleeping quarters
- An outdoor exhibition space
- 155 meters of underground passageways between the buildings on the surface and the Unified Command Post
- The Unified Command Post
- An RT-23/SS-24 missile silo
- An extendable communications antenna
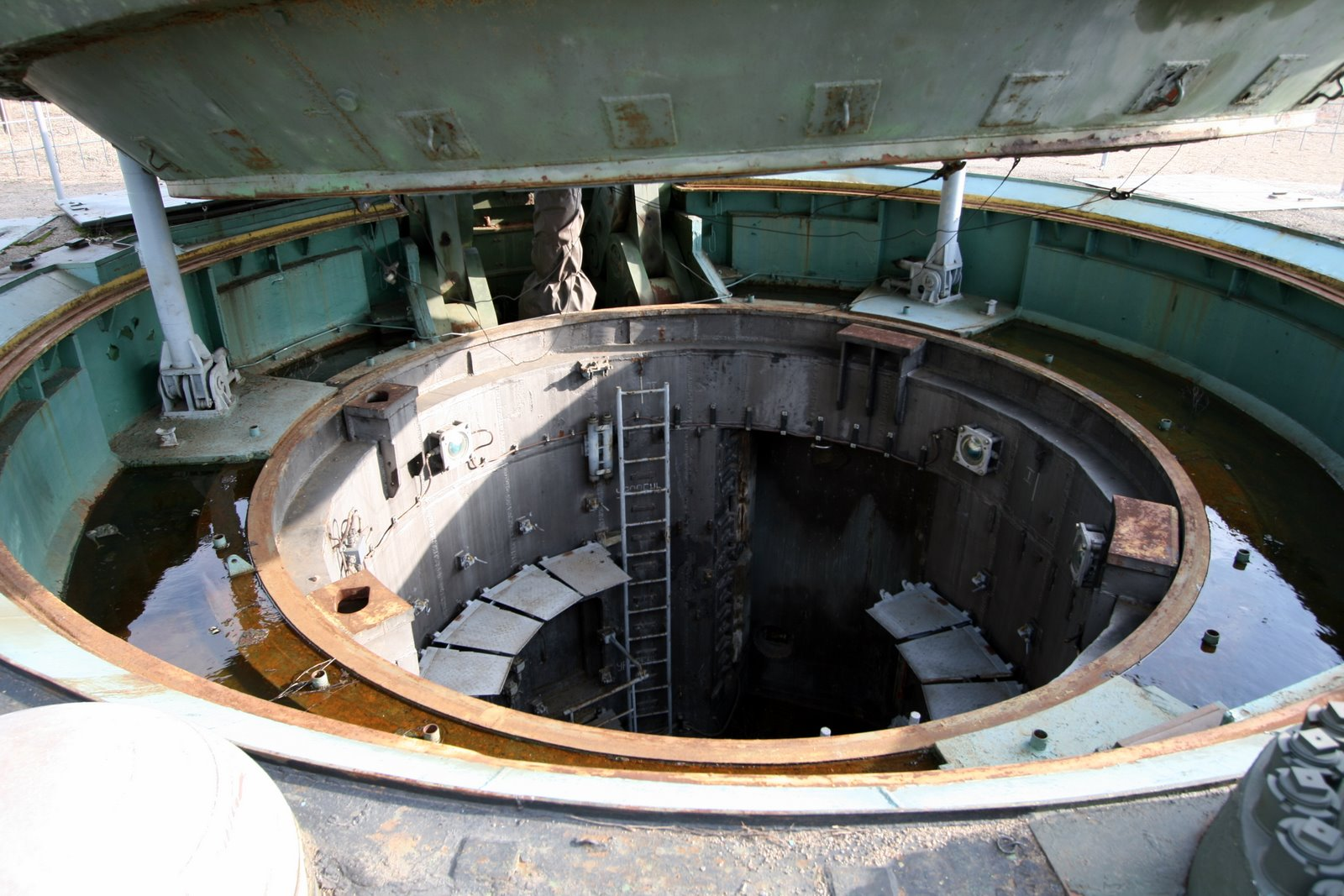
  The RT-23/SS-24 missile silo located inside the museum
- A power supply and ventilation building
- Parts of the original protection facilities

Most of the museums, especially the Unified Command Post, can only be visited on guided tours.

The museum also operates a historical and cultural center located off-premises in Pervomaisk.

=== Outdoor exhibition space ===
The outdoor exhibition space offers a wide variety of exhibits ranging from rocket engine parts, mock warheads and missiles to military vehicles, helicopters and trains. Among them are models of the R-12/SS-4 missile (which played a key role in the Caribbean crisis of 1961) and an original R-36M/RS-20 missile of which not only the exterior but also internal components are shown.

There are also several MAZ-537 (МАЗ-537) heavy-duty military trucks with various trailers which were used to haul new missiles or even whole command posts to their intended destination.

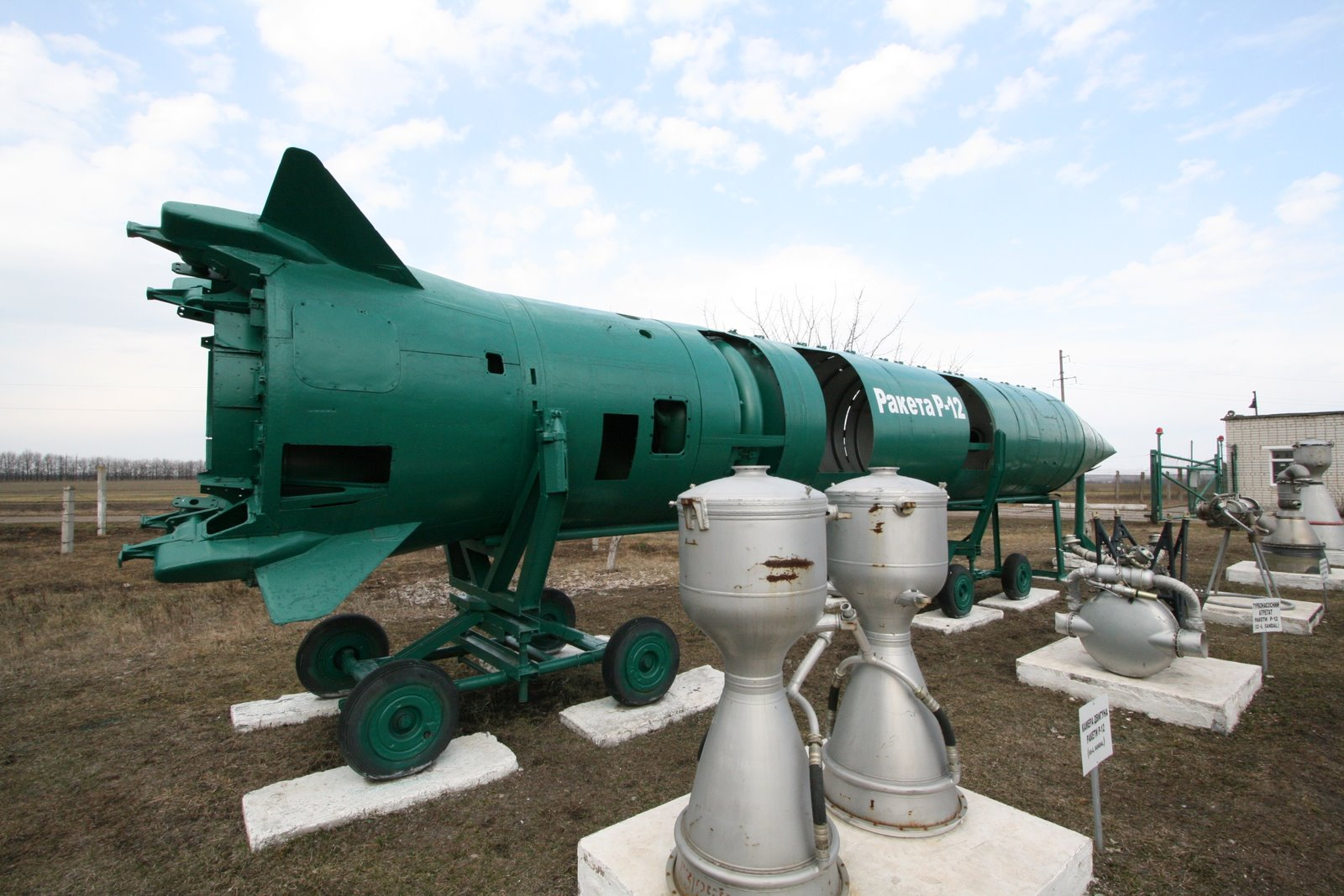
Strategic Missile Forces Museum - missile R-12

=== Underground Unified Command Post (UCP) ===
The Unified Command Post (UCP) is of type KP 15V155/15V252U (КП 15В155/15В52У) and was designed by the Central Bureau for Transportation Technology (ЦКБТМ, now part of Roscosmos).

It is a 33-meter-long, round metal tube, 3.3 meters in diameter and 125 tons in weight. It is located inside a silo three meters below the ground. It consists of eleven compartments which house everything needed to keep the Unified Command Post running autonomously for up to 45 days in case of a nuclear war:

- Compartment 1 and 2 (at the top): Emergency Diesel generators
- Compartment 3: Communications equipment, connected to the outside antenna
- Compartment 4: Automatic control and monitoring
- Compartment 5: Communications equipment
- Compartment 6 and 8: Electric distribution equipment
- Compartment 7: Air Handler equipment
- Compartment 9 and 10: Missile control and launch hardware
- Compartment 11: The actual command post with the missile remote control, monitoring and communications panels. Two officers would be on duty inside this compartment for six-hour shifts.
- Compartment 12 (at the bottom): Sleeping and resting quarters for the second crew

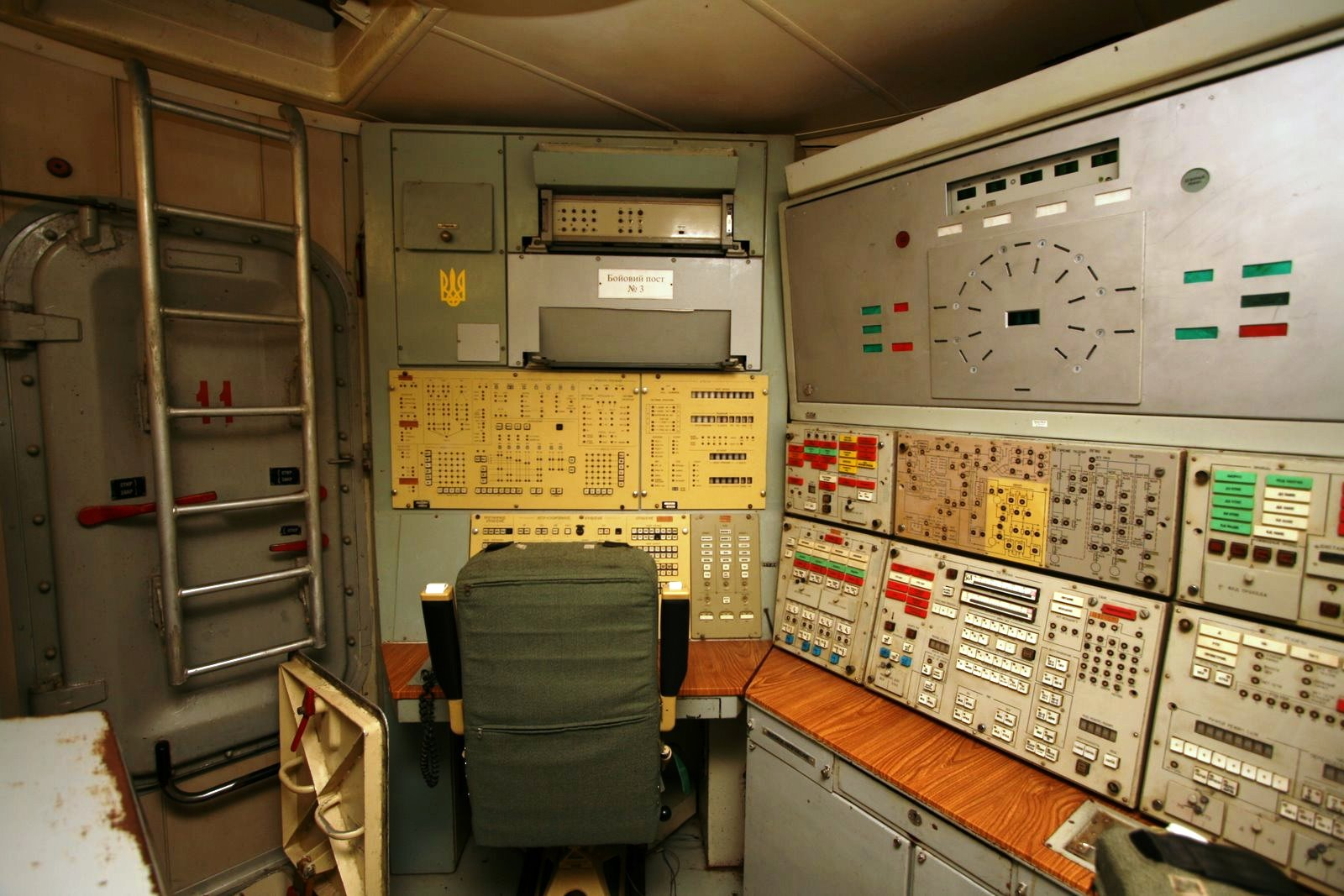
Component of the equipment of 11th UCP compartment

The power supply and ventilation building located outside the UCP count as Compartment 0. The individual segments can be reached via an elevator. When the elevator is in its parking position at the top, the metal tube is suspended inside the silo using hydraulic actuators and can move freely to counter the effects of a direct enemy hit.

Visitors can take the elevator down to Compartment 11 in pairs during guided tours. The command panels have been set up to simulate a fake rocket launch. When both visitors turn their individual launch keys simultaneously, the controls will light up as if during an actual launch.

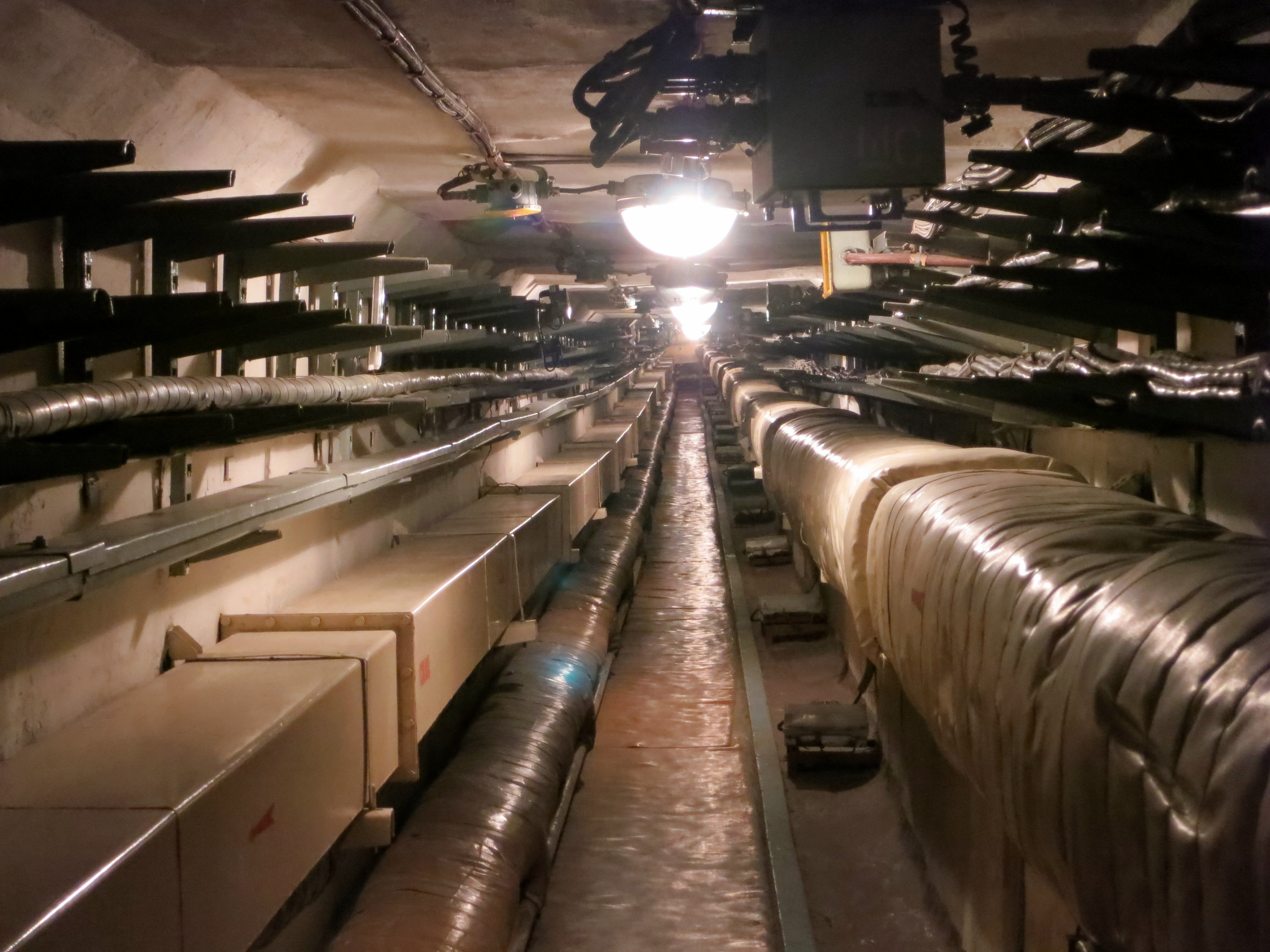
Ukraine Strategic Missile Forces Museum 08 (13503845243)

=== Protection facilities ===
The site was heavily guarded, and the museum has kept much of the original protection facilities. These include a P-100 electric fence, watch towers with machine guns, cameras, seismic alarm sensors and radiation detection systems.

== See also ==
- Nuclear weapons and Ukraine
- Titan Missile Museum
- Plokštinė missile base site of the Cold War Museum
