= List of museums in North Dakota =

This list of museums in North Dakota, United States, is a list of museums, defined for this context as institutions (including nonprofit organizations, government entities, and private businesses) that collect and care for objects of cultural, artistic, scientific, or historical interest and make their collections or related exhibits available for public viewing. Museums that exist only in cyberspace (i.e., virtual museums) are not included.

== Museums ==
| Name | Town/City | County | Region | Type | Summary |
|---|---|---|---|---|---|
| Bagg Bonanza Farm | Mooreton | Richland | Southeast | Farm | Historic bonanza farm buildings and machinery |
| Barnes County History Museum | Valley City | Barnes | Southeast | Local history | Operated by the Barnes County Historical Society |
| Billings County Museum | Medora | Billings | Southwest | Local history | Located in the former county courthouse, operated by the Billings County Historical Society |
| Bismarck State College Galleries | Bismarck | Burleigh | Southwest | Art | Elsa Forde Gallery in Schafer Hall, and Gannon Gallery in the library |
| Bonanzaville, USA | West Fargo | Cass | Southeast | Open air | Includes over 40 buildings on 12 acres (49,000 m2), historic aircraft, automobiles, horse-drawn vehicles, farm equipment, museums on law enforcement, medicine, telephones, firefighting, and period stores and houses |
| Bottineau County Historical Museum | Bottineau | Bottineau | North Central | Local history | |
| Bowdon Centennial Museum | Bowdon | Wells | North Central | Local history | |
| Buckstop Junction | Bismarck | Burleigh | Southwest | Open air | website, historic village on 20 acres, operated by the Missouri Valley Historical Society |
| Buffalo Trails Museum | Epping | Williams | Northwest | Multiple | website, includes a homesteader's log cabin, dentist's office, photograph gallery, library, and the original Stevens country school |
| Camp Hancock State Historic Site | Bismarck | Burleigh | Southwest | Military | History of the mid 19th century infantry post, also local history |
| Cavalier County Museum | Langdon | Cavalier | Northeast | Local history | Operated by the Cavalier County Historical Society |
| Chateau de Mores State Historic Site | Medora | Billings | Southwest | Historic house | Late 19th century period house |
| Coleman Museum | Ellendale | Dickey | South Central | Local history | Operated by the Ellendale Historical Society |
| Dakota Buttes Museum | Hettinger | Adams | Southwest | Local history | |
| Badlands Dinosaur Museum (Dakota Dinosaur Museum) | Dickinson | Stark | Southwest | Natural history | Fossils and dinosaur replicas, rocks, minerals and meteorites |
| Dakota Territory Air Museum | Minot | Ward | Northwest | Aviation | Civilian and military aircraft, photos and memorabilia |
| Dickey County Heritage Center | Oakes | Dickey | Southeast | Local history | Operated by the Dickey County Historical Society |
| Dickinson Museum Center | Dickinson | Stark | Southwest | Multiple | Includes Badlands Dinosaur Museum, Joachim Regional Museum with local history and art exhibits, Pioneer Machinery Museum, and the open air Prairie Outpost Park with historic village buildings |
| Dickinson State University Art Gallery | Dickinson | Stark | Southwest | Art | Located on the lower level of Klinefelter Hall |
| Divide County Museum | Crosby | Divide | Northwest | Open air | Pioneer village including two churches, a schoolhouse, print shop, general store, sawmill, blacksmith shop, baker and a bank |
| Douglas Centennial Museum | Douglas | Ward | Northwest | Local history | Open by appointment |
| Dunn County Historical Museum | Dunn Center | Dunn | Southwest | Local history | website, themes include American Indian, Western, farm machinery, religious, military, children's artifacts, household items, clothing, photographs and furniture |
| Eddy County Museum | New Rockford | Eddy | North Central | Local history | Includes school, church and depot with historic furnishings and exhibits, operated by the Eddy County Historical Society |
| Elgin Museum | Elgin | Grant | Southwest | Railroad | Open by appointment, located in a historic depot |
| Emmons County Museum | Linton | Emmons | Southwest | Local history | Operated by the Emmons County Historical Society, includes schoolroom display, saddles, tack, children's furniture, toys, clothing, household items, military items |
| Empire Arts Center | Grand Forks | Grand Forks | Northeast | Art | |
| Enderlin Museum | Enderlin | Ransom | Southeast | Local history | website |
| Fargo Air Museum | Fargo | Cass | Southeast | Aviation | |
| Flickertail Village Museum | Stanley | Mountrail | Northwest | Open air | |
| Former Governors' Mansion | Bismarck | Burleigh | Southwest | Historic house | 1893 period mansion, home to 20 governors |
| Fort Abercrombie State Historic Site | Abercrombie | Richland | Southeast | Military | Restored fort and museum |
| Fort Abraham Lincoln | Mandan | Morton | Southwest | Multiple | Includes visitor center exhibits about the fort and Mandan tribe, On-A-Slant Indian Village, 1870s period Custer House |
| Fort Buford State Historic Site | Williston | Williams | Northwest | Military | Restored fort and museum |
| Fort Mandan | Washburn | McLean | Northwest | Military | Reconstructed stockade fort |
| Fort Ransom State Park | Fort Ransom | Ransom | Southeast | Multiple | Includes visitor center displays about 19th-century sodbusters and of the Mound Builders, and two homesteader farms |
| Fort Seward | Jamestown | Stutsman | South Central | Local history | website, includes artifacts from archaeological digs at the site of the fort |
| Fort Stevenson State Park | Garrison | McLean | Northwest | Military | Includes Fort Stevenson Guardhouse Interpretive Center, a replica of the original military guardhouse with artifacts, memorabilia, and history of Fort Stevenson and the Missouri River |
| Fort Totten State Historic Site | Fort Totten | Benson | Northeast | Military | Restored fort and Lake Region Pioneer Daughters Museum |
| Fort Union Trading Post National Historic Site | Williston | Williams | Northwest | History | Fur trading post with seasonal living history presentations |
| Foster County Museum | Carrington | Foster | South Central | Local history | |
| Frontier Fort and Wildlife Museum | Jamestown | Stutsman | South Central | Multiple | RV campsite with museum, includes wildlife mounts, American Indian exhibits, agricultural artifacts, local and regional history |
| Frontier Museum | Williston | Williams | Northwest | Open air | Open by appointment, includes a rural church, house, depot, country school, depot taxi, displays from the 20s through the 50s |
| Frontier Village | Jamestown | Stutsman | South Central | Open air | Re-created prairie town of 24 buildings, includes art gallery and Louis L'Amour Writer's Shack |
| Gateway to Science | Bismarck | Burleigh | South Central | Science | website, hands-on science center |
| Gingras Trading Post State Historic Site | Walhalla | Pembina | Northeast | Historic house | Mid-19th century fur trading post and house |
| Goose River Heritage Center Museum | Mayville | Traill | Northeast | Local history | Period displays, open seasonally |
| Grand Forks County Historical Society | Grand Forks | Grand Forks | Northeast | Open air | website, complex includes Myra Museum of local history, 1900 period Thomas D. Campbell House, a Lustron house, a post office/general store, and a schoolhouse |
| Grassy Butte Post Office | Grassy Butte | McKenzie | Northwest | Local history | Ukrainian-type log building formerly used as a post office, open in summer |
| Griggs County Museum | Cooperstown | Griggs | Northeast | Local history | website |
| Hampden History Museum | Hampden | Ramsey | North Central | Local history | |
| Hatton-Eielson Museum | Hatton | Traill | Northeast | Historic house | Boyhood home of polar aviator Carl Ben Eielson, also displays of city and area history |
| Hawk Museum | Wolford | Pierce | North Central | Agriculture | website, antique tractors, farm equipment and implements |
| Heritage Park Museum | Garrison | McLean | Northwest | Open air | Includes a train depot, country school, country church, telephone office, two fully furnished homestead houses, and a log cabin |
| Hettinger County Historical Society Museum | Regent | Hettinger | Southwest | Local history | |
| James Memorial Art Center | Williston | Williams | Northwest | Art | Community art center |
| Knife River Indian Villages National Historic Site | Stanton | Mercer | Northwest | Native American | Includes museum, sites of Northern Plains Indians villages, reconstructed earth lodge |
| Lake County Historical Society Pioneer Village and Museum | Kenmare | Ward | Northwest | Open air | 22 buildings on 5 acres, operated by the Lake County Historical Society |
| Lake Region Heritage Center | Devils Lake | Ramsey | North Central | Local history | Displays include a pioneer doctor's room, the original federal courtroom, an early law office, a barber shop, a dentist office and Native American beadwork, also art exhibits |
| LaMoure County Museum | LaMoure | LaMoure | South Central | Local history | |
| Larimore Community Museum | Larimore | Grand Forks | Northeast | Local history | |
| Lewis and Clark Trail Museum | Alexander | McKenzie | Northwest | Local history | Exhibits include Lewis and Clark Expedition diorama, antiques and period displays, cars, machinery, homestead artifacts |
| Lidgerwood Community Museum | Lidgerwood | Richland | Southeast | Local history | |
| Litchville Community Museum | Litchville | Barnes | Northwest | Local history | |
| Logan County Historical Society | Napoleon | Logan | Northwest | Open air | |
| Ludwig and Christina Welk Homestead | Strasburg | Emmons | Southwest | Historic house | Turn-of-the-20th-century farmhouse and birthplace of orchestra leader Lawrence Welk |
| Makoti Threshers Museum | Makoti | Ward | Northwest | Open air | Open by appointment, pioneer village, and transportation and farm equipment, including steam engines, kerosene and gasoline tractors, crawlers, road building equipment, wagons, sawmill, farm equipment, stationary engines, cars, trucks, and firefighting equipment |
| Manfred Heritage Museum | Manfred | Wells | North Central | Open air | |
| Manvel Museum | Manvel | Grand Forks | Northeast | Local history | |
| Maury Wills Museum | Fargo | Cass | Southeast | Biographical | Life of baseball player Maury Wills, located at Newman Outdoor Field |
| McLeod Museum Complex | McLeod | Ransom | Southeast | Open air | website, includes local history museum in a church, one room schoolhouse, depot, homestead house, fire hall, farm machinery, operated by the McLeod Preservation Historical Society |
| McHenry Railroad Loop | McHenry | Foster | North Central | Railroad | End-of-the-line turn-around railroad loop, train rides and museum |
| McKenzie County Heritage Park | Watford City | McKenzie | Northwest | Open air | |
| McLean County Historical Society Museums | Washburn | McLean | Northwest | Multiple | website, complex includes main museum with local history, natural history and culture exhibits, Former McLean County Courthouse with period room and business displays, a schoolhouse, cabin and Sioux ferry boat |
| Melzer Museum | Woodworth | Stutsman | Northwest | Medical | Historic doctor's office, includes American Indian photography |
| Memorial Union Gallery at North Dakota State University | Fargo | Cass | Southeast | Art | Changing special exhibits and displays from its collection of 20th and 21st-century art, including works by Andy Warhol, Judy Chicago, Pablo Picasso, Fritz Scholder, James Rosenquist, and Jaune Quick-To-See Smith |
| Mercer County Historical Museum | Beulah | Mercer | Northwest | Local history | |
| Midland Continental Depot Transportation Museum | Wimbledon | Barnes | South Central | Railroad | Historic depot, exhibits about the Midland Continental Railroad and local singer Peggy Lee |
| Minnewaukan Museum | Minnewaukan | Benson | Northwest | Local history | |
| Missouri-Yellowstone Confluence Interpretive Center | Williston | Williams | Northwest | Local history | Exhibits on the geography, geology, and history of the area |
| National Buffalo Museum | Jamestown | Stutsman | South Central | History | website, cultural and historical significance of the North American bison in Plains culture, includes live buffalo, located at the Frontier Village |
| Norseman Museum | Tioga | Williams | Northwest | Local history | |
| North American Game Warden Museum | Dunseith | Rolette | North Central | Law enforcement | Located in the International Peace Garden, work of game wardens and conservation officers |
| North Dakota Cowboy Hall of Fame | Medora | Billings | Southwest | American West | website, history and culture of the American West, including cowboys, Native Americans, ranching and rodeo |
| North Dakota Firefighters Museum | Garrison | McLean | Northwest | Firefighting | website |
| North Dakota Fishing Hall of Fame | Garrison | McLean | Northwest | Sports | Housed at North Country Marine & Motorsports, includes photos, fishing gear and equipment |
| North Dakota Heritage Center | Bismarck | Burleigh | Southwest | History | Official state history museum |
| North Dakota Lewis and Clark Interpretive Center | Washburn | McLean | Northwest | History | Lewis and Clark Expedition in the state, area fur trade and agriculture |
| North Dakota Maritime Museum | Devils Lake | Ramsey | North Central | Military | U.S. Navy uniforms, posters, medals, photos, hats, memorabilia, most from World War II |
| North Dakota Museum of Art | Grand Forks | Grand Forks | Northeast | Art | website Collections include contemporary Native American and international art |
| North Dakota State Capitol | Bismarck | Burleigh | Southwest | History | Guided tours only |
| North Dakota State Railroad Museum | Mandan | Morton | Southwest | Railroad | website |
| Northern Lights Art Gallery | Mayville | Traill | Northeast | Art | Non-profit regional art gallery |
| Northwest Art Center | Minot | Ward | Northwest | Art | website, part of Minot State University, two galleries host exhibitions by local, regional, national and international artists |
| Northwood Pioneer Museum | Northwood | Grand Forks | Northeast | Local history | |
| Old Soo Depot Transportation Museum | Minot | Ward | Northwest | Transportation | History of transportation in the American West including railroads, automobiles, buses and aviation |
| Ox Cart Trails Historical Society Museum | Drayton | Pembina | Northeast | Local history | website |
| Paul Broste Rock Museum | Parshall | Mountrail | Northwest | Geology | website, rocks and minerals |
| Pembina County Historical Museum | Cavalier | Pembina | Northeast | Agriculture | |
| Pembina State Museum | Pembina | Pembina | Northeast | Local history | Area cultural and natural history |
| Pfennig Wildlife Museum | Beulah | Mercer | Northwest | Natural history | Animal mounts from around the world |
| Pioneer Heritage Center at Icelandic State Park | Cavalier | Pembina | Northeast | Open air | |
| Pioneer Museum of McKenzie County | Watford City | McKenzie | Northwest | Local history | Located in the Long X Trading Post Visitor Center |
| Pioneer Trails Museum | Hanks | Williams | Northwest | Local history | |
| Pioneer Trails Regional Museum | Bowman | Bowman | southwest | Local history | website |
| Plains Art Museum | Fargo | Cass | Southeast | Art | Collections include contemporary, Native American and folk art |
| Plaza Community Museum | Plaza | Mountrail | Northwest | Local history | |
| Prairie Village Museum | Rugby | Pierce | North Central | Open air | website, includes pioneer village, classic cars, antique tools, farm equipment and implements, antique guns, household items, Native American and Eskimo artifacts, wildlife displays, Scandinavian heritage exhibit |
| Railroad Museum of Minot | Minot | Ward | Northwest | Railroad | Railroad cars, equipment, uniforms, memorabilia |
| Ransom County Historical Museum | Fort Ransom | Ransom | Southeast | Open air | website, includes flour mill, historic house, one room schoolhouse, pioneer dam, local history and period room displays |
| Ray Opera House Museum | Ray | Williams | Northwest | Local history | Exhibits include musical instruments, pioneer artifacts and African artifacts |
| Renville County Museum | Mohall | Renville | Northwest | Local history | |
| Richland County Historical Museum | Wahpeton | Richland | Southeast | Local history | |
| Roger Maris Museum | Fargo | Cass | Southeast | Biographical | Baseball player Roger Maris |
| Rolette County Historical Society Museum | St. John | Rolette | North Central | Open air | |
| Ronald Reagan Minuteman Missile State Historic Site | Cooperstown | Griggs | South Central | Military | Two former missile sites, includes the Oscar-Zero Missile Alert Facility |
| Rosebud School Museum | Fullerton | Dickey | South Central | School | 1901 country school |
| Ryder Historical Museums | Ryder | Ward | Northwest | Local history | |
| Sargent County Museum | Forman | Sargent | Southeast | Local history | website |
| Scandinavian Heritage Park | Minot | Ward | Northwest | Open air | Replica buildings and exhibits about Sweden, Norway, Denmark, Finland, and Iceland |
| Schulstad Stone House Museum | Forbes | Dickey | South Central | Historic house | 1907 period house, open by appointment |
| Shimmin Tveit Museum | Forbes | Dickey | South Central | Local history | |
| Steele County Museum | Hope | Steele | Southeast | Local history | Operated by the Steele County Historical Society |
| Stump Lake Village Pioneer Museum | Pekin | Nelson | North Central | Open air | website, pioneer village, operated by the Nelson County Historical Society |
| Stutsman County Memorial Museum | Jamestown | Stutsman | South Central | Local history | website, Arts and Crafts-style Lutz Mansion with period rooms and displays of local history |
| Taube Museum of Art | Minot | Ward | Northwest | Art | Formerly known as the Minot Art Gallery, area visual art |
| Theodore Roosevelt's Maltese Cross Cabin | Medora | Billings | Southwest | Historic house | Located in Theodore Roosevelt National Park, cabin used by Theodore Roosevelt before he became president |
| Three Affiliated Tribes Museum | New Town | Mountrail | Northwest | Native American | History and culture of the Mandan, Hidatsa and Arikara people |
| Tofthagen Library and Museum | Lakota | Nelson | North Central | Local history | |
| Toy Farmer Museum | LaMoure | LaMoure | South Central | Toy | website, toy farm equipment |
| Traill County Museum Complex | Hillsboro | Traill | Northeast | Open air | Includes 1897 period Plummer House, log cabin, two buildings with military, school, pioneer and agriculture collections |
| Turtle Mountain Chippewa Indian Heritage Center | Belcourt | Rolette | North Central | Native American | website, located on the Turtle Mountain Indian Reservation |
| V & R Toy Museum | Kenmare | Ward | Northwest | Toy | Includes farm toys, construction toys, trucks, hand-made toys, buckles, caps, train set and farm scene display, open by appointment |
| Victorian Dress Museum | Rugby | Pierce | North Central | Textile | Reproduction - prize winning - Victorian style dresses and accessories, located in former church |
| Walsh County Historical Museum | Minto | Walsh | Northeast | Open air | Includes a trading post, country school, log cabin, complete main street with shops, wildlife displays |
| Ward County Historical Society Pioneer Village | Burlington, North Dakota | Ward | Northwest | Open air | website, located at 8181 Hwy 2/52 W, Burlington, ND 58722 |
| Wells County Museum | Fessenden | Wells | Northwest | Local history | Open during the Wells County Fair and by appointment |
| Wimbledon Community Museum | Wimbledon | Barnes | South Central | History | Antiques and period displays |

== Defunct museums ==
- Cass County Pioneer Village, Ayr
- Children's Museum at Yunker Farm, Fargo

== See also ==
- List of historical societies in North Dakota
- Nature Centers in North Dakota
