= Griggs County Museum =

Coordinates: 47.441°N 98.119°W

The Griggs County Museum contains thousands of pioneer artifacts going back to the 1880s and the days of Bonanza Farmers R.C. and T.J. Cooper after whom Cooperstown was named. The museum also contains the Northern Plains Cold War Interpretive Center which supplements a visit to the Ronald Reagan Minuteman Missile State Historic Site more commonly known as Oscar Zero.

== Location ==
The Griggs County Museum is at 203 12th Street Southeast in Cooperstown, North Dakota. It is just north of Highway 200 and three blocks east of Highway 45.

== Hours ==
The museum is open on Sundays from 1:30 PM to 4:30 PM between Memorial Day and Labor Day and by special appointment.

== History ==
The Griggs County Historical Society was organized October 19, 1960 at the home of F. A. Helland with 21 charter members. F. A. (Fritz) Helland was elected president of the organization, Walter Bohnsack vice president and Miss Irene Pratt, secretary-treasurer. Mrs. Myrtle Porterville was made an honorary member of the society. The first museum building was built in 1970.

== See also ==
- Griggs County Historical Society website
- List of museums in North Dakota
