= McLean County Courthouse =

McLean County Courthouse may refer to:

- McLean County Courthouse and Square, Bloomington, Illinois
- Former McLean County Courthouse, Washburn, North Dakota
- McLean County Courthouse (North Dakota), Washburn, North Dakota
