= Executive Mansion =

Executive Mansion may refer to:

- an official residence
- Executive Mansion, Monrovia, Liberia
- White House, Washington D.C., U.S.
- Executive Mansion (Virginia), U.S.
- Illinois Governor's Mansion, U.S., formerly known as the Illinois Executive Mansion
- Montana Governor's Residence, U.S., formerly known as the Montana Executive Mansion
- New York State Executive Mansion, U.S.
- North Carolina Executive Mansion, U.S.
- South Carolina Governor's Mansion, U.S. or South Carolina Executive Mansion
- West Virginia Governor's Mansion, U.S. or West Virginia Executive Mansion

== See also ==
- Governor's Mansion (disambiguation)
- Former North Dakota Executive Mansion, U.S.
- Old Executive Mansion, Wisconsin, U.S.
