= McLean County Courthouse (North Dakota) =

- U.S. National Register of Historic Places
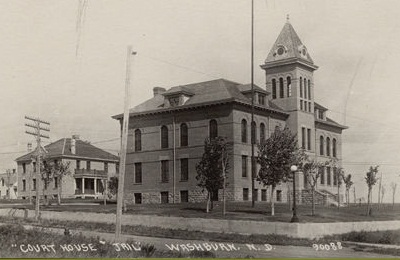
- McLean County Courthouse and Jail, c. 1910-1919

- Location within North Dakota Location within the United States
- Location: Fifth Ave., Washburn, North Dakota
- Coordinates: 47°17′27″N 101°1′34″W
- Area: 2.1 acres (0.85 ha)
- Built: 1908
- Built by: Pauley Jail Bldg. Co.
- Architect: Hancock Bros.
- Demolished: 2013
- MPS: North Dakota County Courthouses TR
- NRHP reference No.: 85002998
- Added to NRHP: November 14, 1985

The McLean County Courthouse in Washburn, North Dakota was built in 1908. It was a 2 1/2-story brick building with a central tower above the front entrance. It was listed on the National Register of Historic Places in 1985. The listing included two contributing buildings.

It was designed by the Hancock Brothers architectural firm from Fargo, North Dakota. The courthouse replaced a previous courthouse built in 1905.

Because of health concerns in the old building, county voters in 2010 approved the construction of a new courthouse. The 1908 courthouse was demolished in 2013.

== See also ==
- Former McLean County Courthouse, also NRHP-listed
