= McHenry Railroad Loop =

- U.S. National Register of Historic Places
- Location within North Dakota Location within the United States
- Nearest city: McHenry, North Dakota
- Coordinates: 47.57808°N 98.59966°W
- Area: 32.5 acres (13.2 ha)
- Built: 1899
- Built by: Northern Pacific Railway Company
- NRHP reference No.: 86002751
- Added to NRHP: October 2, 1986

The McHenry Railroad Loop near McHenry, North Dakota was built in 1899 by the Northern Pacific Railway Company. Also known as McHenry or as End of Line or as Northern Pacific Railroad Turn Around Loop, it was listed on the National Register of Historic Places in 1986. The listing included 32.5 acres (13.2 ha).

It is puzzling why the railroad put in a loop of railroad, rather than a far less expensive railroad turntable. The cost difference at the time would be approximately $5,000 vs. $500.
