= Killing of Cayler Ellingson =

2022 homicide in North Dakota

- Location: McHenry, North Dakota, U.S.
- Date: September 18, 2022; 4 years ago
- Target: Cayler Ellingson
- Attack type: Vehicle-ramming attack
- Weapon: Ford Explorer SUV
- Deaths: 1
- Assailant: Shannon Brandt
- Charges: Manslaughter
- Sentence: 5 years in prison

On September 18, 2022, 18-year-old Cayler Ellingson was killed in a vehicle-ramming attack around McHenry, North Dakota. After he was struck by a Ford Explorer SUV driven by a 41-year-old man, Shannon Brandt, Ellingson was taken to a hospital in Carrington, North Dakota, where he was pronounced dead.

Brandt called 9-1-1. An initial highway patrol report claimed that Brandt said he attacked Ellingson for being part of a "Republican extremist group". Brandt said that the victim was calling someone else on the phone before he attacked, who was later identified as Ellingson's mother. Brandt reportedly interpreted the call as an attempt to report him to others. According to North Dakota Highway Patrol Capt. Bryan Niewind there was "no evidence" to Brandt's assertions "that this incident involved politics". The 911 transcript includes Brandt saying that Ellingson “was saying something about some Republican extremist group,” and that Brandt feared that Ellingson was calling someone to "take care of him."

A blood test found Brandt's blood alcohol content level was 0.08, the legal limit for driving.

In May 2023, Brandt pleaded guilty to manslaughter in connection with Ellingson's death. In September 2023, Brandt was sentenced to five years in prison.

== Arrest and charges ==
Brandt was charged with vehicular homicide and released on bail of US$50,000 (equivalent to about $55,000 in 2025). However, on September 22, the charges were upgraded to include murder, a class AA felony, the maximum penalty for which is life imprisonment without parole. Foster County, North Dakota State's Attorney Kara Brinster moved that the previous charges, including criminal vehicular homicide, be dismissed. The new charges filed in district court were based on an investigation by the North Dakota Highway Patrol and the state Bureau of Criminal Investigation which included interviews with people involved and an autopsy of the victim.

== Reaction from Donald Trump ==
US President Donald Trump criticized the media for allegedly not giving the killing sufficient coverage. In a speech in North Carolina on September 23, Trump stated that "Just recently, a young 18-year-old man from North Dakota ... was targeted and killed, run down in cold blood with an SUV by a radical left maniac. This guy ran him down and not one mainstream media network has even mentioned this horrible crime... Think of it the other way. Supposing a mad person ran down somebody on the other side, it would be the biggest story you've ever seen."

== See also ==
- Charlottesville car attack, 2017 attack in Charlottesville, Virginia
- Waukesha Christmas Parade Attack
