= Episcopal Church of the Good Shepard-Lakota =

Historic church in North Dakota, United States

- U.S. National Register of Historic Places
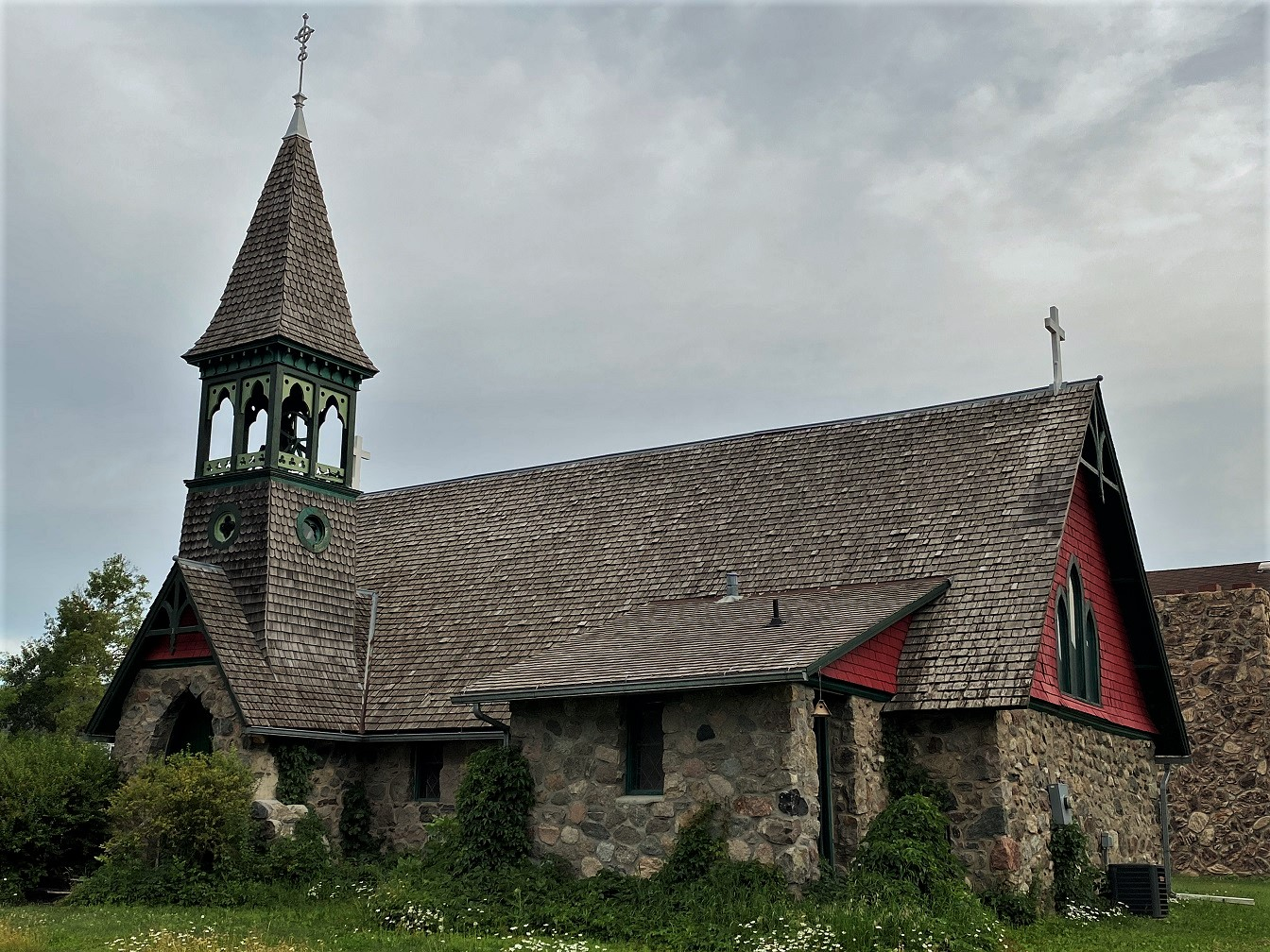

- Location within North Dakota Location within the United States
- Location: 216 D Ave. W. Lakota, North Dakota
- Coordinates: 48°02′37″N 98°20′44″W
- MPS: Episcopal Churches of North Dakota MPS
- NRHP reference No.: 100001743
- Added to NRHP: October 10, 2017

The Episcopal Church of the Good Shepard-Lakota was listed on the National Register of Historic Places in 2017.

It was bought in 2015 by Steve Martens, a retired architecture professor of North Dakota State University.

It was then renovated over a nine-month period and serves as a vacation home for two couples.
