= High Butte Effigy and Village Site =

- High Butte Effigy and Village Site (32ME13)
- U.S. National Register of Historic Places
- Location: Address restricted
- Nearest city: Riverdale, North Dakota
- Area: 3 acres (1.2 ha)
- NRHP reference No.: 78001991
- Added to NRHP: May 22, 1978

The High Butte Effigy and Village Site (32ME13) is an ancient Native American ceremonial site near the Garrison Dam and Riverdale, North Dakota. The site was listed on the National Register of Historic Places in 1978. It is located atop a butte and includes a "turf cut turtle effigy." Items recovered from the site include 14 points, 24 body sherds, five rim sherds, and a grooved paddle.

The property is protected by the State Historical Society of North Dakota and is known as Turtle Effigy State Historic Site.
