= Joseph Henry Taylor =

American author and frontiersman (1844–1908)

- Born: 1844; Nottingham, Pennsylvania, U.S.
- Died: April 9, 1908 (aged 63–64); Washburn, North Dakota, U.S.
- Occupations: Author, editor, printer, trapper, hunter, farmer, soldier
- Known for: Frontiersman

Joseph Henry Taylor (January 1844 – April 9, 1908) was an American author, soldier, fur trapper, hunter, and printer. Born in Chester County, Pennsylvania, he served in the Union Army and lived on the Western frontier. He self-published four books on frontier life and nature and was among the first white settlers of Washburn, North Dakota.

== Early life and military service ==
Taylor was born to Quaker parents William and Elizabeth Taylor in Nottingham, Chester County, Pennsylvania, most likely in January 1844. Sources give different birth dates, ranging from 1843 to 1845. Taylor trained as a printer and enlisted in the Union Army on April 20, 1861. Mustered out in August, he promptly reenlisted and served until captured by Confederate forces in Virginia in May 1863. Paroled on condition that he never again fight against the Confederacy, he joined a mounted battalion to patrol Iowa's northern border against feared Sioux attacks. He mustered out in December 1863 and subsequently worked as a hunter and trapper.

== Life on the frontier ==
While in Iowa, Taylor became engaged to the daughter of another settler. In 1865, he moved to Yankton, South Dakota, to launch and edit the Dakotan, the first Democratic newspaper in the Dakota Territory, under the aegis of Congressional delegate John Blair Smith Todd. While he was away, his betrothed married another man. Heartbroken, Taylor became a frontiersman and wanderer, earning his living as a trapper and hunter along the Platte River and Missouri River and living several years alongside Plains Indians.

In 1869, Taylor settled on a homestead in Painted Woods, a settlement south of Washburn, North Dakota, and by 1877 had become a full-time farmer and rancher. As postmaster of Painted Woods, he had his neighbors deposit their mail into a hollow tree trunk rather than having them visit his cabin, reflecting what contemporaries deemed his retiring disposition. In 1887, he opened a small printing office and became editor of the McLean County Mail. He became a justice of the peace for Burleigh County in 1873 and was elected register of deeds for McLean County in 1898. Late in life, he resumed a long-distance correspondence with his former betrothed. Between 1891 and 1904, he self-published four books on frontier life and nature, printing the volumes in his own shop.

== Death and legacy ==
Taylor died of heart failure in his Washburn print shop on April 9, 1908. His remains were embalmed and taken east to be interred in the family burial plot in Oxford,Pennsylvania. His original cabin was moved to Washburn in 1932 and was featured in the town's 50th anniversary celebration. The cabin remains in downtown Washburn and is open to the public as a historic house museum.

After his youthful engagement ended in heartbreak, Taylor never married or had children. He had four brothers and a sister, all of whom also moved to Iowa or even further westward. One brother, Maris Taylor, served as North Dakota's surveyor general.

== Bibliography ==
- Taylor, Joseph Henry (1904). Beavers: Their Ways and Other Sketches. Washburn, ND: Printed and published by the author.
- Taylor, Joseph Henry (1902). Kaleidoscopic Lives, A Companion Book to Frontier and Indian Life. Washburn, ND: Printed and published by the author.
- Taylor, Joseph Henry (1897). Sketches of Frontier and Indian Life on the Upper Missouri and Great Plains. Bismarck, ND: Printed and published by the author.
- Taylor, Joseph Henry (1891). Twenty Years on the Trap Line: Being a Collection of Revised Camp Notes, Written at Intervals During a Twenty Years Experience in Trapping, Wolfing and Hunting, on the Great Northwestern Plains. Bismarck, ND: Printed and published by the author.
