= Former North Dakota Executive Mansion =

Historic house in North Dakota, United States

- U.S. National Register of Historic Places
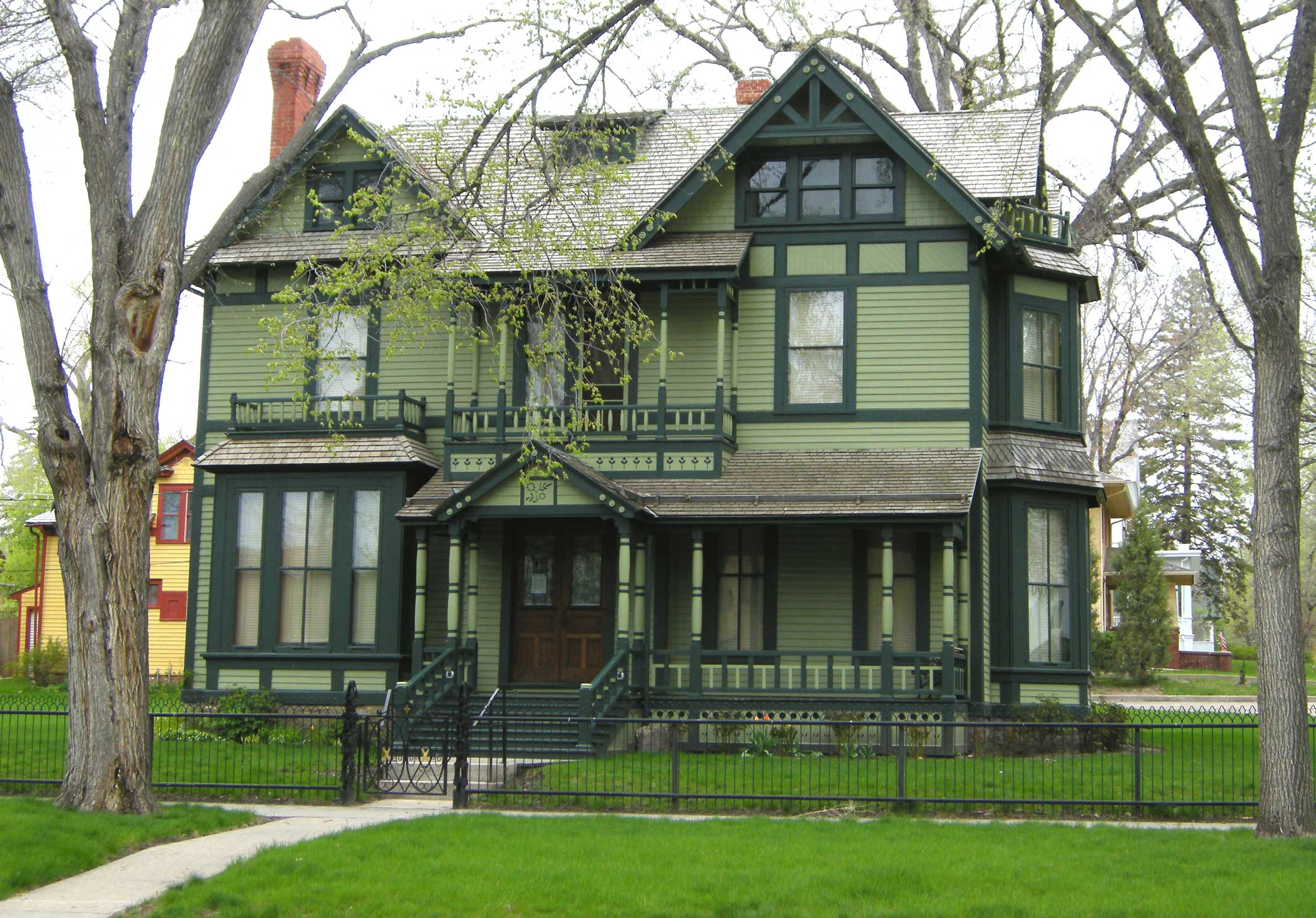

- Location within North Dakota Location within the United States
- Location: 320 Ave. B, E., Bismarck, North Dakota
- Coordinates: 46°48′40″N 100°47′10″W
- Area: 0.5 acres (0.20 ha)
- Built: 1893
- Architectural style: Mid-Victorian, Late Victorian
- NRHP reference No.: 75001301
- Added to NRHP: April 16, 1975

The Former North Dakota Executive Mansion, also or formerly known as Old Governor's Mansion or Asa Fisher House, at 320 Ave. B., E., in Bismarck, North Dakota, was built in 1893.

It served "as the official residence of the governors of North Dakota for nearly 67 years. The last Governor to occupy it was John E. Davis whose term of office ran through 1960." From 1961 through 1975, the former house was used for offices of the State Health Department.

It was listed on the National Register of Historic Places in 1975.

The original governor's mansion was built in 1884 as a private home for Bismarck businessman Asa Fisher. Fisher homesteaded in Edwinton (Bismarck) in 1872 and made his fortune in banking, real estate and liquor sales. In 1893, the house was sold to the state for $5000. The house was used as the governor's residence from 1893 to 1960 and was the home of twenty North Dakota governors. In 1975, the State Legislature passed House Bill 1315 which transferred ownership to the State Historical Society of North Dakota. The house was renovated to look as it did in 1893 and opened to the public as a North Dakota State Historic Site in 1983.

== See also ==
- North Dakota Governor's Residence
