= Lakota, North Dakota =

- City
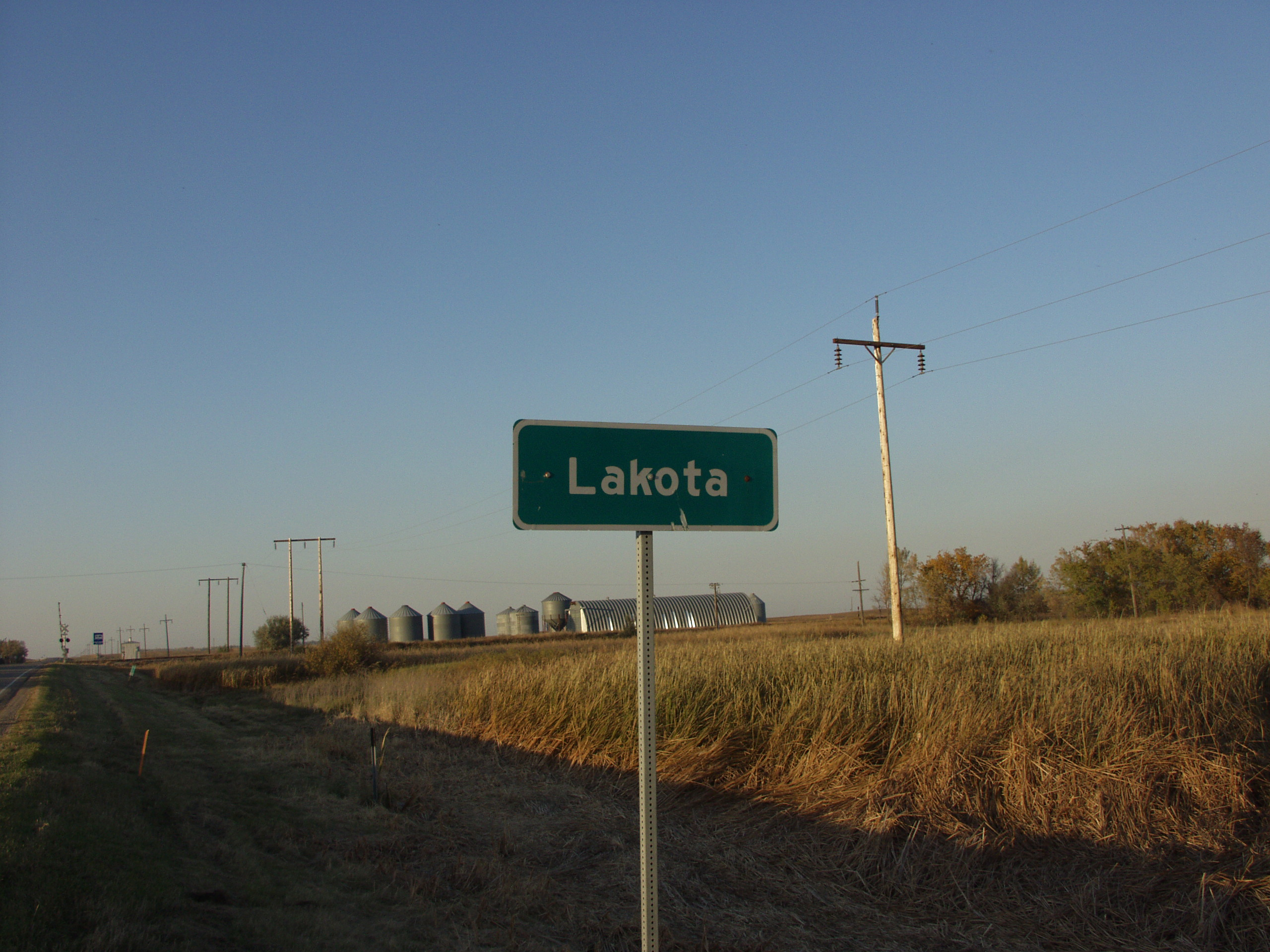
- Lakota, North Dakota

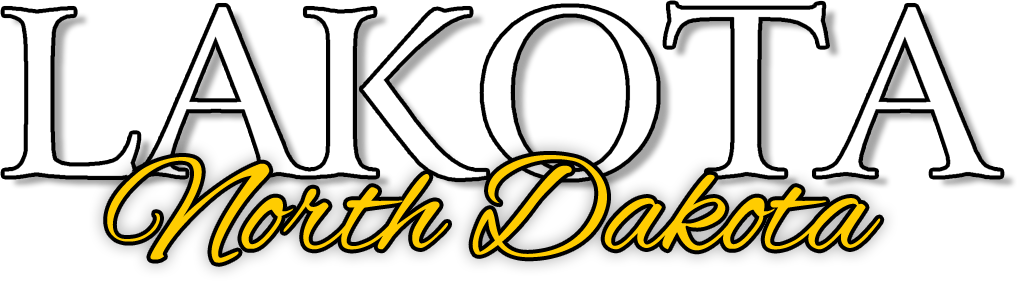
- Logo

- Location of Lakota, North Dakota
- Coordinates: 48°02′34″N 98°20′48″W
- Country: United States
- State: North Dakota
- County: Nelson
- Founded: 1883

Area
  - Total: 1.00 sq mi (2.59 km^{2})
  - Land: 1.00 sq mi (2.59 km^{2})
  - Water: 0 sq mi (0.00 km^{2})
- Elevation: 1,522 ft (464 m)

Population (2020)
  - Total: 683
  - Estimate (2022): 683
  - Density: 680/sq mi (264/km^{2})
- Time zone: UTC-6 (Central (CST))
  - Summer (DST): UTC-5 (CDT)
- ZIP code: 58344
- Area code: 701
- FIPS code: 38-44300
- GNIS feature ID: 1036113
- Website: lakota-nd.com

Lakota is a city in Nelson County, North Dakota, United States. It is the county seat of Nelson County. Lakota is located 63 miles west of Grand Forks and 27 miles east of Devils Lake. The population was 683 at the 2020 census, making Lakota the 76th-largest city in North Dakota.

== Geography and climate ==
According to the United States Census Bureau, the city has a total area of 1.032 square miles, all land.

Like the rest of North Dakota, Lakota has a continental climate. Lakota's lowest average temperature is -18 degrees Celsius/0 degrees Fahrenheit (in January); its highest average temperature is 26 degrees Celsius/79 degrees Fahrenheit (through July and August).

== Demographics ==
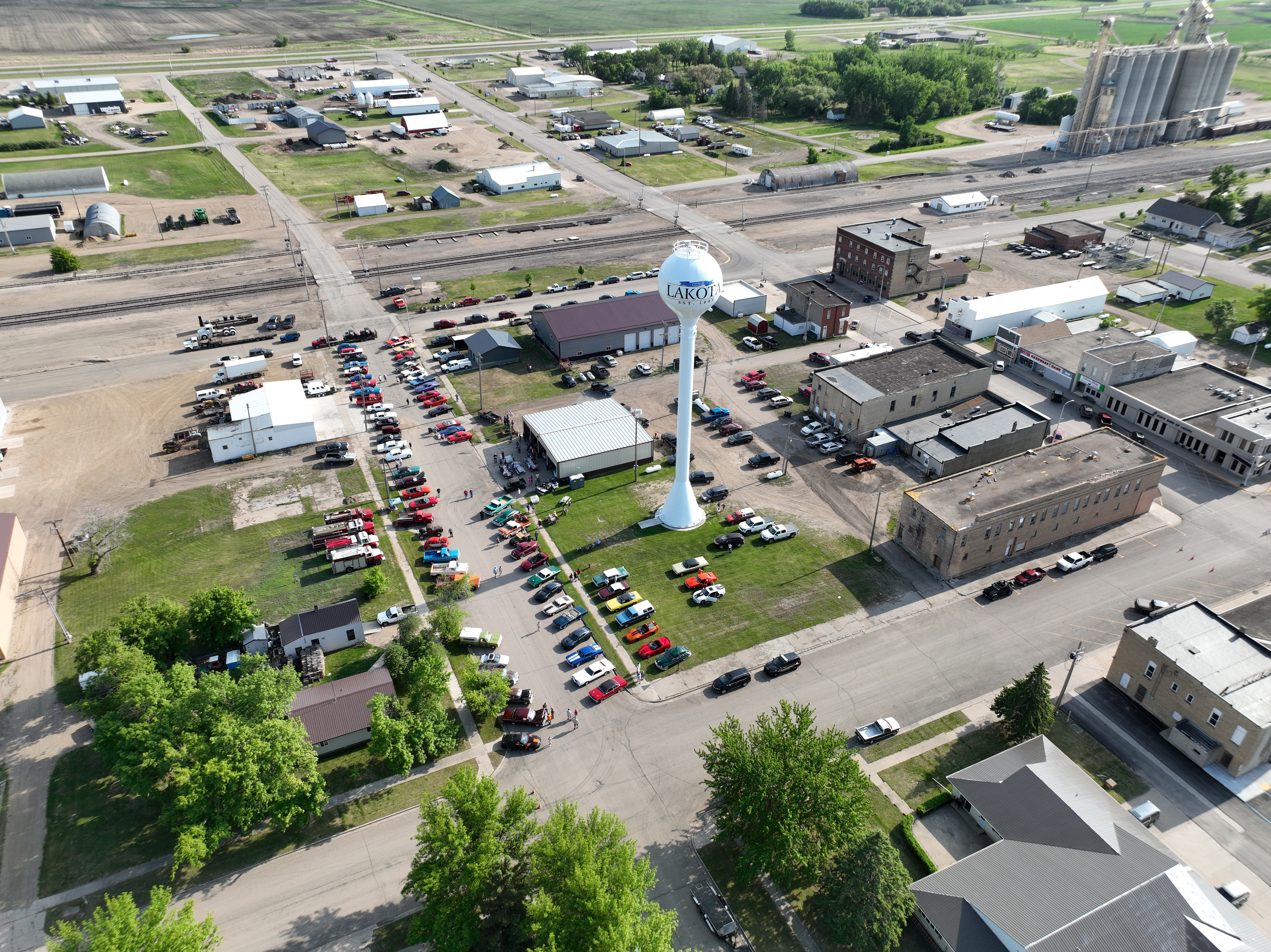
Water Tower behind Lakota City Hall.

Historical population
Census	Pop.	Note	%±
1890	227		—
1900	576		153.7%
1910	1,023		77.6%
1920	959		−6.3%
1930	860		−10.3%
1940	907		5.5%
1950	1,032		13.8%
1960	1,066		3.3%
1970	964		−9.6%
1980	963		−0.1%
1990	898		−6.7%
2000	781		−13.0%
2010	672		−14.0%
2020	683		1.6%
2022 (est.)	683		0.0%
U.S. Decennial Census; 2020 Census

=== 2010 census ===
As of the census of 2010, there were 672 people, 338 households, and 196 families residing in the city. The population density was 652.4 inhabitants per square mile (251.9/km^{2}). There were 403 housing units at an average density of 391.3 per square mile (151.1/km^{2}). The racial makeup of the city was 96.7% White, 0.3% African American, 1.9% Native American, and 1.0% from two or more races.

There were 338 households, of which 21.3% had children under the age of 18 living with them, 47.3% were married couples living together, 5.3% had a female householder with no husband present, 5.3% had a male householder with no wife present, and 42.0% were non-families. 40.8% of all households were made up of individuals, and 21.3% had someone living alone who was 65 years of age or older. The average household size was 1.99 and the average family size was 2.65.

The median age in the city was 50.3 years. 19.5% of residents were under the age of 18; 5.2% were between the ages of 18 and 24; 16.4% were from 25 to 44; 30.9% were from 45 to 64; and 28% were 65 years of age or older. The gender makeup of the city was 49.7% male and 50.3% female.

=== 2000 census ===
As of the census of 2000, there were 781 people, 345 households, and 212 families residing in the city. The population density was 764.2 inhabitants per square mile (295.1/km^{2}). There were 387 housing units at an average density of 378.7 per square mile (146.2/km^{2}). The racial makeup of the city was 97.82% White, 0.77% Native American, 0.38% Asian, 0.13% from other races, and 0.90% from two or more races. Hispanic or Latino of any race were 0.13% of the population. 48.0% were of Norwegian and 24.0% German ancestry.

There were 345 households, of which 25.8% had children under the age of 18 living with them, 51.6% were married couples living together, 7.2% had a female householder with no husband present, and 38.3% were non-families. 36.5% of all households were made up of individuals, and 24.1% had someone living alone who was 65 years of age or older. The average household size was 2.10 and the average family size was 2.74.

In the city, the population was spread out, with 20.7% under the age of 18, 3.1% from 18 to 24, 19.3% from 25 to 44, 27.0% from 45 to 64, and 29.8% who were 65 years of age or older. The median age was 49 years. For every 100 females, there were 82.5 males. For every 100 females age 18 and over, there were 76.4 males.

The median income for a household in the city was $26,940, and the median income for a family was $37,292. Males had a median income of $29,375 versus $16,250 for females. The per capita income for the city was $15,819. About 7.7% of families and 10.2% of the population were below the poverty line, including 18.4% of those under age 18 and 9.1% of those age 65 or over.

== Transportation ==
Amtrak’s Empire Builder, which operates between Seattle/Portland and Chicago, passes through the town on BNSF tracks, but makes no stop. The nearest station is located in Devils Lake, 27 miles (43 km) to the northwest.

== Notable people ==
- Charles Watson Boise, mining engineer
- Asle Jorgenson Gronna, U.S. Senator
- Rick Helling, World Series champion MLB pitcher

== See also ==
- Episcopal Church of the Good Shepard-Lakota
- Tofthagen Library and Museum
