= Former McLean County Courthouse =

- U.S. National Register of Historic Places
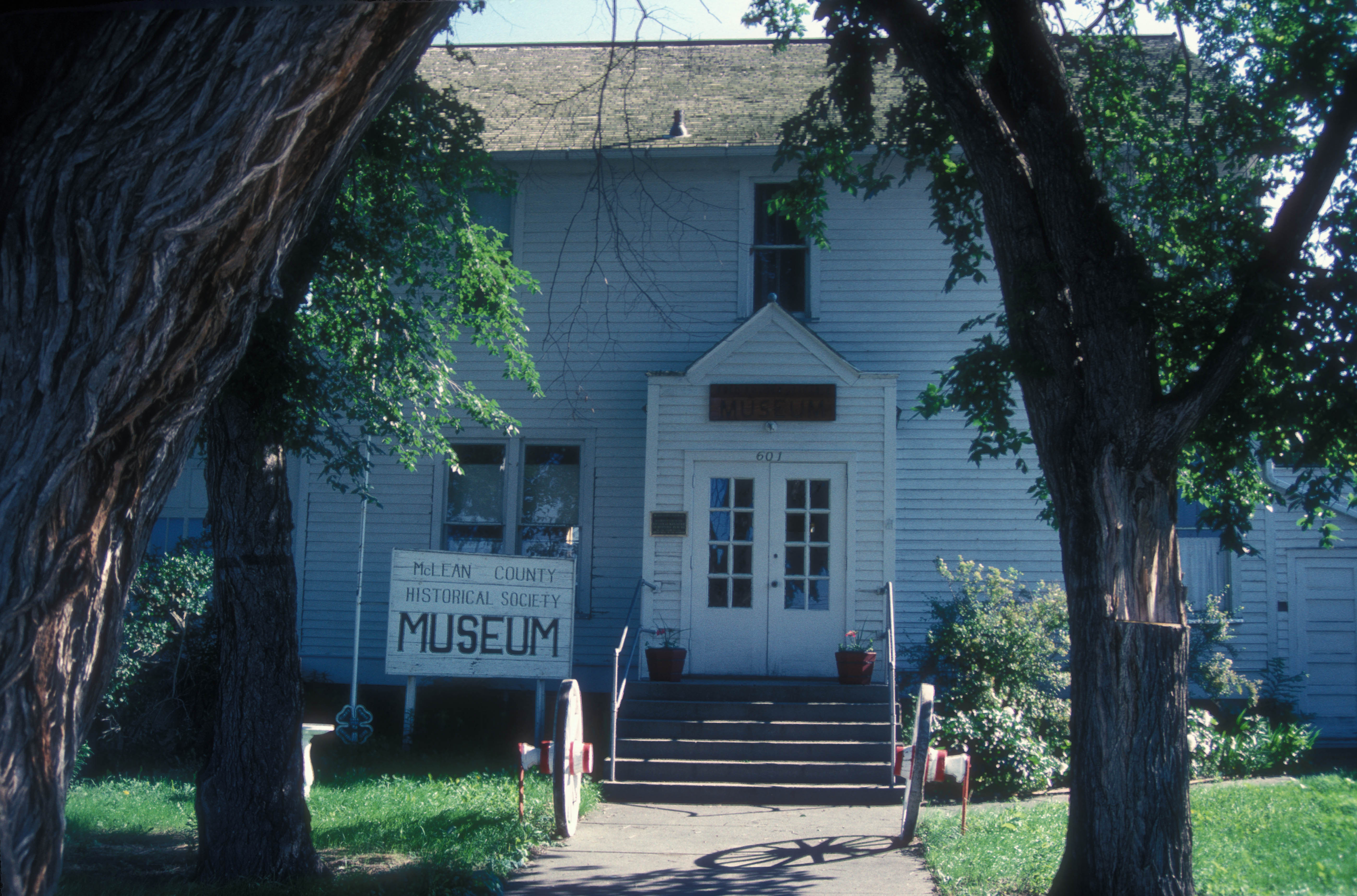
- photo from 2007

- Location within North Dakota Location within the United States
- Location: 602 Main Ave., Washburn, North Dakota
- Coordinates: 47°17′23″N 101°1′44″W
- Area: less than one acre
- Built: 1905
- Architectural style: Colonial Revival, Georgian Revival
- MPS: North Dakota County Courthouses TR
- NRHP reference No.: 85002987
- Added to NRHP: November 14, 1985

The Former McLean County Courthouse in Washburn, North Dakota was built in 1905 to replace a courthouse that had burned down, and was used as a courthouse until 1917, when the new McLean County Courthouse was built.

The building is now used as one of the buildings of the McLean County Historical Society Museums.

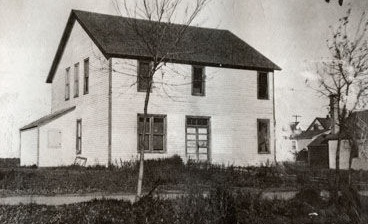
Old McLean County Courthouse, c. 1905–1915, photo published before 1923.

It was listed on the National Register of Historic Places in 1985.
