= Billings County Courthouse =

- U.S. National Register of Historic Places
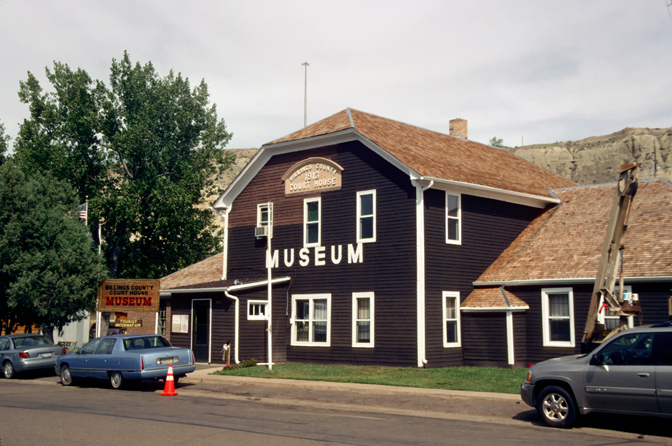

- Location within North Dakota Location within the United States
- Location: 4th St. and 4th Ave., Medora, North Dakota
- Coordinates: 46°54′46″N 103°31′20″W
- Area: less than one acre
- Built: c.1880
- Architect: John Tester (1913 remodel)
- MPS: North Dakota County Courthouses TR
- NRHP reference No.: 77001016
- Added to NRHP: December 16, 1977

The Billings County Courthouse in Medora, North Dakota was built c.1880 and was remodeled in 1913 with architect John Tester. It was listed on the National Register of Historic Places in 1977.

According to its NRHP nomination, the courthouse "symbolizes the orderly administration of justice in a county which is one of the least populated in North Dakota. The structure is also a physical link with the first years of settlement in the region, its core being formed from a building believed to date from the 1880s."

The Billings County Museum has been located in the former county courthouse since 1986. Exhibits include a collection of barbed wire, fencing, farm and automotive tools, guns and weapons, military artifacts, horse riding and Western items, and displays of ethnic items from area pioneers. Visitors can also view the restored courtroom and jail, and a period bunkhouse, general store and kitchen. The museum is operated by the Billings County Historical Society.
