= Ronald Reagan Minuteman Missile State Historic Site =

North Dakota state historic site

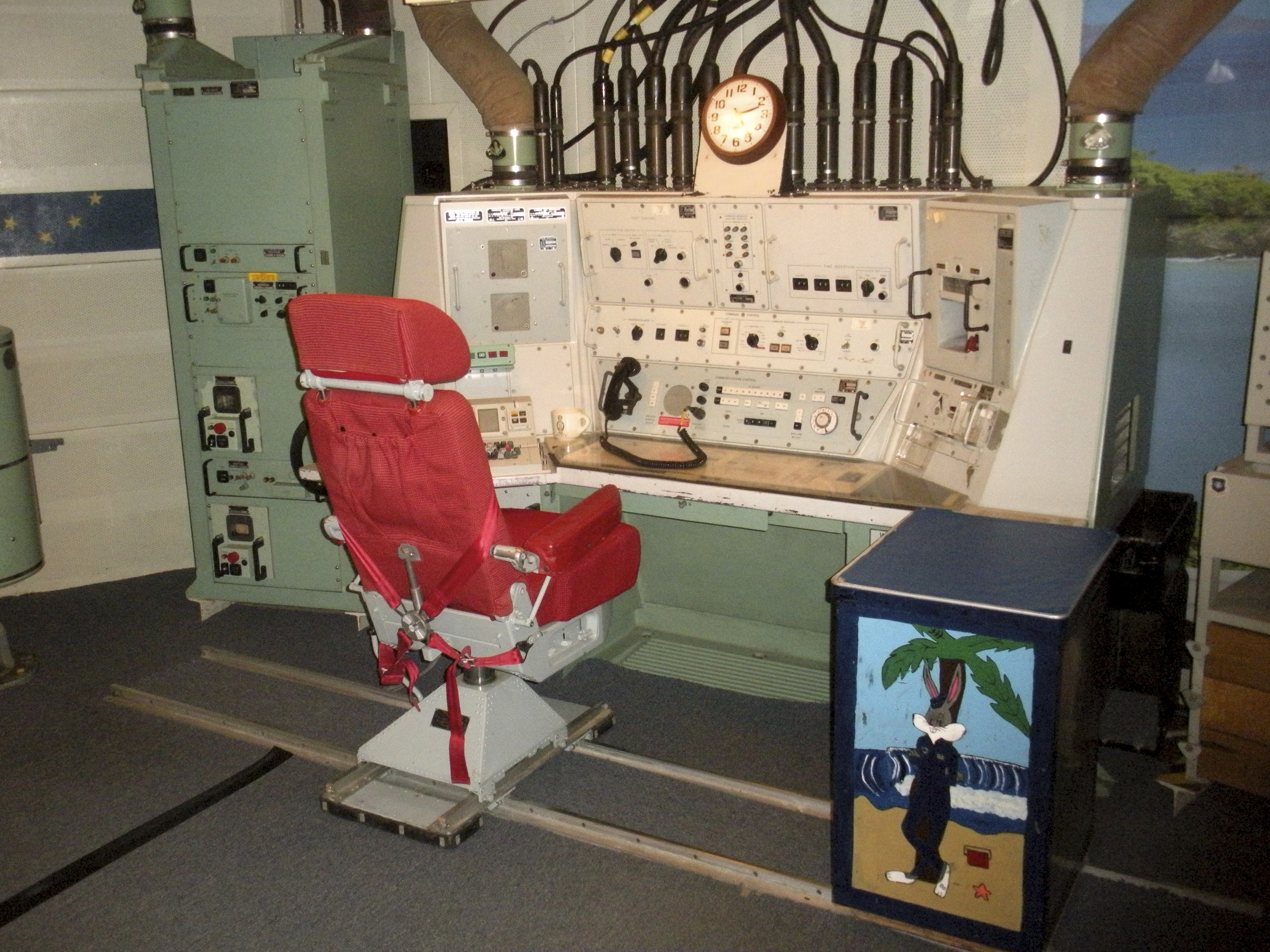
- Oscar Zero Missile Alert Facility

- Location within North Dakota Location within the United States
- Location: Griggs County, North Dakota, U.S.
- Nearest city: Cooperstown, North Dakota
- Coordinates: 47°29′51″N 98°07′37″W
- Area: 17 acres (6.9 ha)
- Established: July 29, 2009
- Governing body: State Historical Society of North Dakota
- Website: Ronald Reagan Minuteman Missile State Historic Site

The Ronald Reagan Minuteman Missile State Historic Site consists of two former missile sites around Cooperstown, North Dakota that were part of North Dakota military activities during the Cold War years: the Oscar-Zero Missile Alert Facility and the November-33 Launch Facility. The site is operated by the State Historical Society of North Dakota.

The two facilities are the last of the 321st Missile Wing, a cluster of intercontinental ballistic missile launch sites that were spread over a 6,500-square-mile (17,000 km^{2}) area around the Grand Forks Air Force Base. These facilities played a major part in how the United States responded to the training and testing of responding to a nuclear threat. The Oscar-Zero Site is the last launch control center intact for the public to visit, along with the top-side access to November 33 missile facility.

Visitors access the sites through guided tours of topside facilities to learn about daily life of the people who monitored the missiles, and also can tour the underground launch control operations.

== See also ==
- List of museums in North Dakota
- Minuteman Missile National Historic Site
- Titan Missile Museum
- Strategic missile forces museum in Ukraine – Similar museum in the former Soviet Union
