= Pembina State Museum =

Museum in North Dakota, United States

Coordinates: 48°58′24″N 97°15′17″W

The Pembina State Museum is a North Dakota State Historical Society-owned museum in Pembina, North Dakota. It features two exhibit galleries and an observation tower.

== Collections ==
The permanent gallery features the history of the Pembina area. Beginning with fossils and prehistoric tools, it begins to focus on the trade industry of North Dakota's first white settlement. The Red River ox cart and other fur trade industry items are on display. The museum also explains the frontier forts and the Canada–US border. The second gallery features 1,000 sq ft (100 m^{2}) of temporary exhibit space.

== Observation tower ==
The observation tower is a 7-story tower that offers a view of the Red River of the North and the surrounding area. Visitors can also see across into Canada.
