= North Dakota Lewis and Clark Interpretive Center =

Coordinates: 47°18′04″N 101°02′30″W

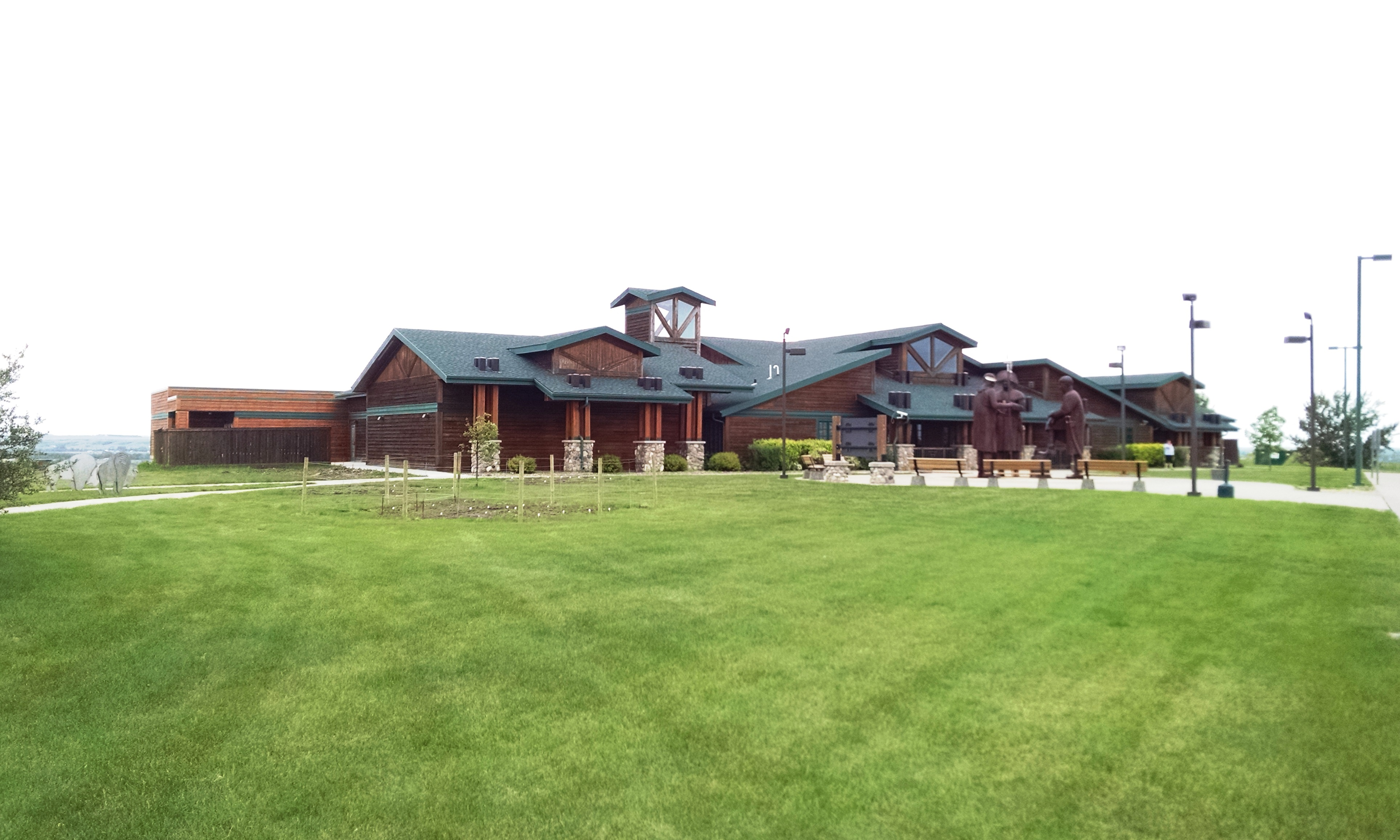
The North Dakota Lewis & Clark Interpretive Center in Washburn, North Dakota

The North Dakota Lewis and Clark Interpretive Center, operated by the State Historical Society of North Dakota, interprets the history of the Lewis and Clark Expedition. It focuses on the winter of 1804–1805, which they spent at Fort Mandan, a post they built near a Mandan village. The center was opened in 1997 and overlooks the Missouri River on the outskirts of Washburn, North Dakota (38 miles north of Bismarck, North Dakota's capital), the center opened in 1997. It is located about two miles from the reconstructed Fort Mandan.

The center also interprets other aspects of North Dakota history, including the farming-based cultures of the Mandan and Hidatsa Native American nations, the fur trade at Fort Clark Trading Post State Historic Site, the 1830s expedition by Prince Maximilian of Wied-Neuwied through the area, and the later development of agriculture in the state.

The center also includes a museum store, temporary exhibits, an events facility, and a research library. It is attached to a highway rest stop serving Highways 83 and 200A. There are images on display by Karl Bodmer, a Swiss artist who traveled to North Dakota in 1833 with Prince Alexander Maximilian of Wied, Germany.

Fort Mandan has been reconstructed. This small fort was the Corps of Discovery's wintering post from 1804 to 1805. The interpretive staff offers tours of the fort from April–September, as well as daily interpretive programs.

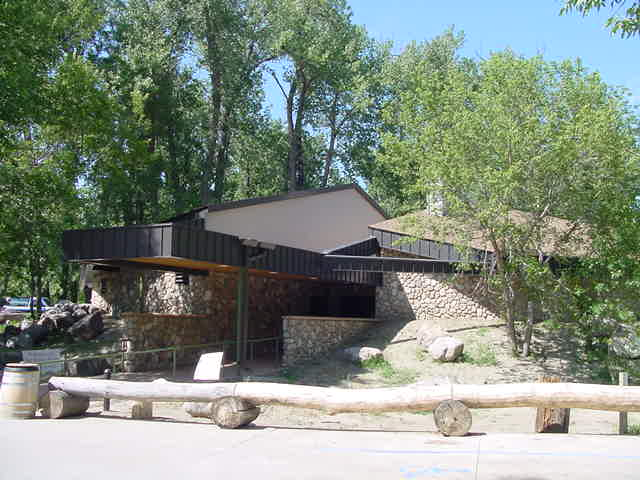
Headwaters Visitor Center near the reconstructed Fort Mandan

== See also ==
- Lewis and Clark State Park is situated on one of the upper bays of Lake Sakakawea, 19 miles (31 km) southeast of Williston, North Dakota
