= State Historical Society of North Dakota =

American state heritage agency

The State Historical Society of North Dakota is an agency that preserves and presents history through museums and historic sites in the state of North Dakota. The agency operates the North Dakota Heritage Center in Bismarck, which serves as a history museum for the state, oversees the preservation of the state's historic places, and presents the history of the state to the public in exhibits and branch museums. The Society also operates the Former North Dakota Executive Mansion in Bismarck.

== Organization ==
Headquartered in Bismarck, the State Historical Society consists of one governing board of appointees and four divisions, each with a different function.

=== State Historical Board ===
The State Historical Board consists of twelve members. Seven members are appointed by the governor to staggered three-year terms. The current board president is Matt Dunlevy, the vice president is Amy Mossett, and the secretary is Lacey Anderson.

=== Historic Preservation Division ===
The Historic Preservation Division prepares a statewide historic preservation plan and inventories, evaluates, and nominates sites to be listed on the State and National Register of Historic Places. The division assists in the preservation of North Dakota historic properties at all levels, and also reviews and comments on federally assisted projects to ensure that historic values are considered in project planning and execution.

=== State Archives Division ===
The State Archives is responsible for the documentary collections of the State Historical Society of North Dakota. It is the official state archives, and acquires and preserves all types of research materials relating to North Dakota and the Northern Great Plains, including manuscript collections, books, periodicals, maps, newspapers, audio and video materials, and photographs.

=== Museum and Education Division ===
The Museum and Education Division presents the history of North Dakota through exhibits in the North Dakota Heritage Center as well as in branch museums (such as the Pembina State Museum) and traveling exhibits. The Division staff provide technical assistance on exhibit design and collection care to the public and other museums in the state. The division is responsible for preserving and exhibiting the artifacts in the collection, including approximately 650,000 pieces in the archaeological collection and 43,000 artifacts in the history, ethnology, and natural history collections.

=== Support Services Division ===
The Support Services Division provides general supervision of all programs and responsibilities of the agency through the office of the director. Support and coordination are provided through budgeting, accounting, purchasing, personnel services, communications, inventory control, and overall security functions.

== List of North Dakota State Historic Sites ==
| Name | Town/City | County |
|---|---|---|
| Bismarck-Deadwood Stage Trail Historic Marker | Flasher | Morton |
| Brenner Crossing State Historic Site | | Eddy |
| Camp Hancock State Historic Site | Bismarck | Burleigh |
| Cannonball Stage Station State Historic Site | | Grant |
| Chateau de Mores State Historic Site | Medora | Billings |
| Crowley Flint Quarry State Historic Site | | Mercer |
| David Thompson State Historic Site | Verendrye | McHenry |
| Double Ditch Indian Village | | Burleigh |
| Former North Dakota Executive Mansion | Bismarck | Burleigh |
| Fort Abercrombie State Historic Site | | Richland |
| Fort Buford State Historic Site | | Williams |
| Fort Clark Trading Post State Historic Site | | Mercer |
| Fort Dilts State Historic Site | | Bowman |
| Fort Mandan Overlook State Historic Site | | McLean |
| Fort Ransom State Historic Site | Fort Ransom | Ransom |
| Fort Rice State Historic Site | | Morton |
| Fort Totten State Historic Site | Fort Totten | Benson |
| Gingras Trading Post State Historic Site | | Pembina |
| Hudson Townsite State Historic Site | | Dickey |
| Huff Indian Village State Historic Site | | Morton |
| Killdeer Mountain Battlefield State Historic Site | | Dunn |
| Lake Jessie State Historic Site | | Griggs |
| Maple Creek Crossing State Historic Site | | Cass |
| Medicine Rock State Historic Site | | Grant |
| Menoken Indian Village State Historic Site | Bismarck | Burleigh |
| Missouri-Yellowstone Confluence Interpretive Center | | Williams |
| Molander Indian Village State Historic Site | | Oliver |
| North Dakota Heritage Center | Bismarck | Burleigh |
| Oak Lawn Church State Historic Site | | Pembina |
| Palmer's Spring State Historic Site | | Benson |
| Pembina State Museum | Pembina | Pembina |
| Pulver Mounds State Historic Site | | McLean |
| Ronald Reagan Minuteman Missile State Historic Site | Cooperstown | Griggs |
| St. Claude State Historic Site | Nash | Rolette |
| Standing Rock State Historic Site | | Ransom |
| Steamboat Warehouse Historic Marker | Bismarck | Burleigh |
| Stutsman County Courthouse State Historic Site | Jamestown | Stutsman |
| Sweden State Historic Site | Nash | Walsh |
| Turtle Effigy State Historic Site | | Mercer |
| Wadeson Cabin State Historic Site | | Barnes |
| Walhalla State Historic Site | Walhalla | Pembina |
| Welk Homestead | Strasburg | Emmons |
| Whitestone Hill State Historic Site | | Dickey |
| Writing Rock State Historical Site | | Divide |

== See also ==
- List of historical societies in North Dakota
