= Tofthagen Library and Museum =

- Tofthagen Library Museum
- U.S. National Register of Historic Places
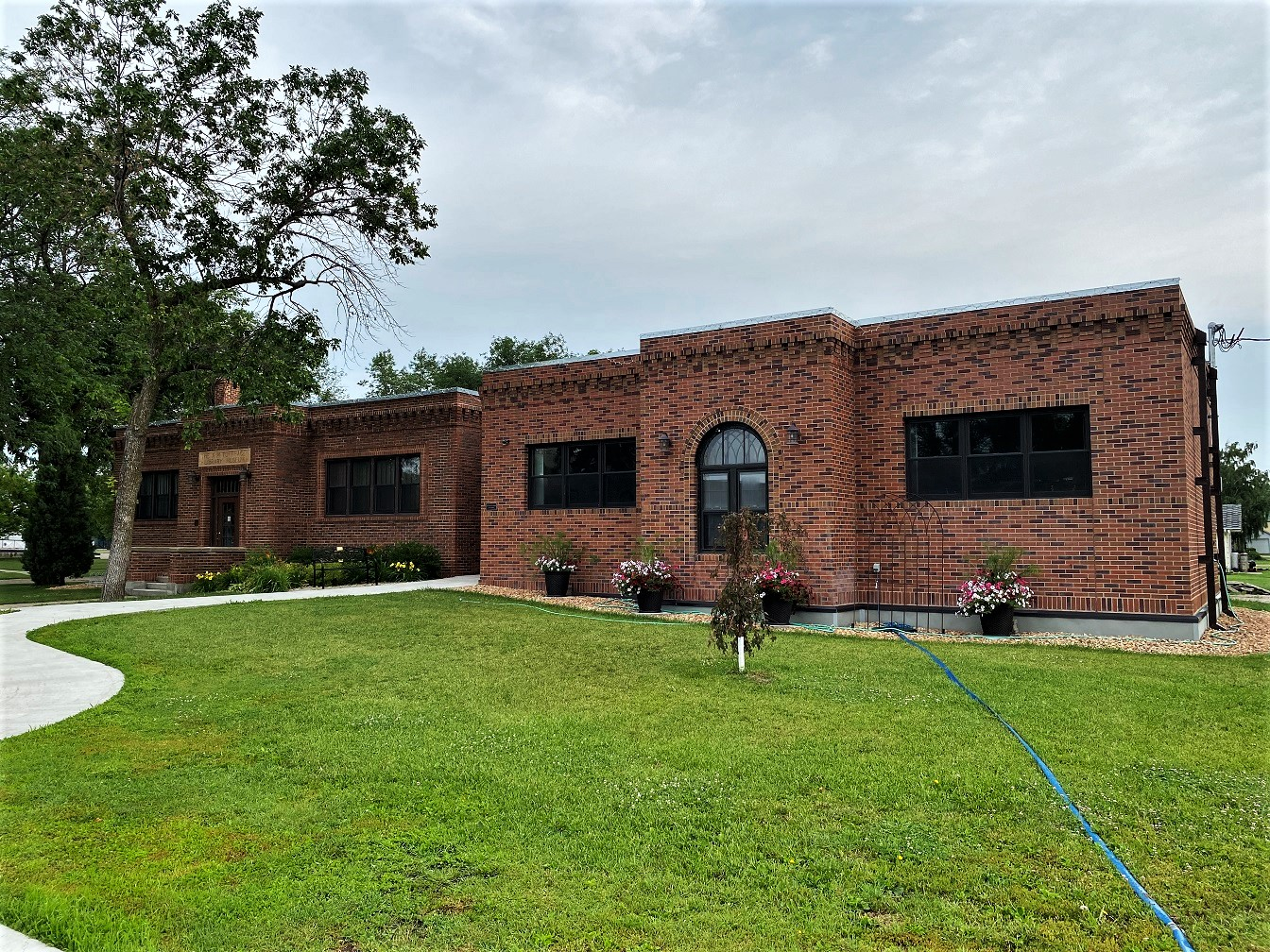

- Location within North Dakota Location within the United States
- Location: 116 W. B Ave. Lakota, North Dakota
- Coordinates: 48°2′30″N 98°20′41″W
- Area: less than one acre
- Built: 1927
- Architectural style: Prairie School
- MPS: Philanthropically Established Libraries in North Dakota MPS
- NRHP reference No.: 91001467
- Added to NRHP: September 26, 1991

The Tofthagen Library and Museum on W. B Ave. in Lakota, North Dakota, is a building erected in 1927. It has also been known as the Lakota City Library.

It includes Prairie School architecture. It was listed on the National Register of Historic Places in 1991 as Tofthagen Library Museum.

It is named for the library's donor, Amun M. Tofthagen, who was born in Hundorp, Norway in 1858.
