= North Dakota Heritage Center =

History museum in North Dakota, United States

Coordinates: 46°49′09″N 100°46′49″W

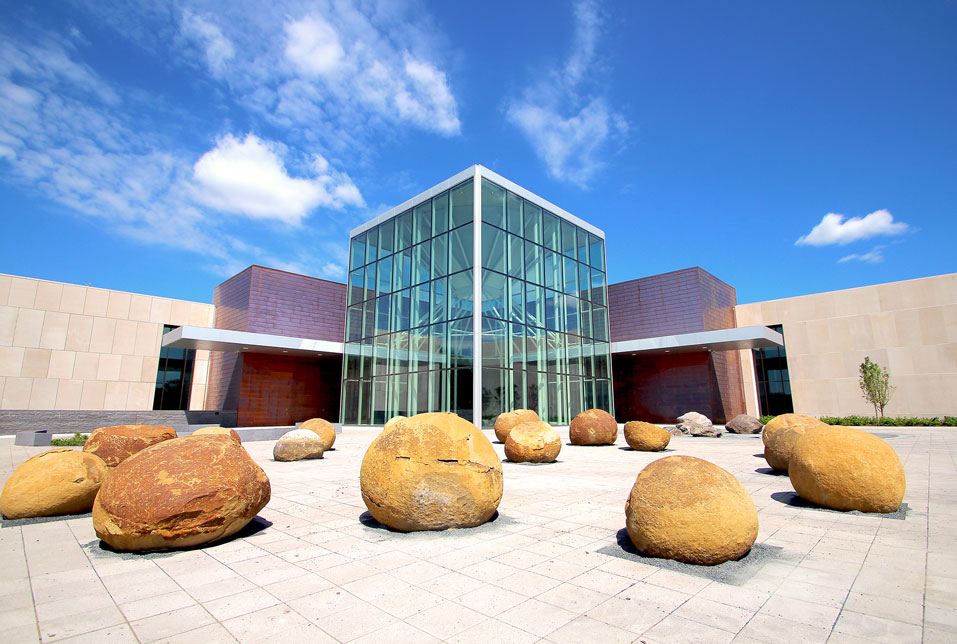
North Dakota Heritage Center & State Museum front entrance

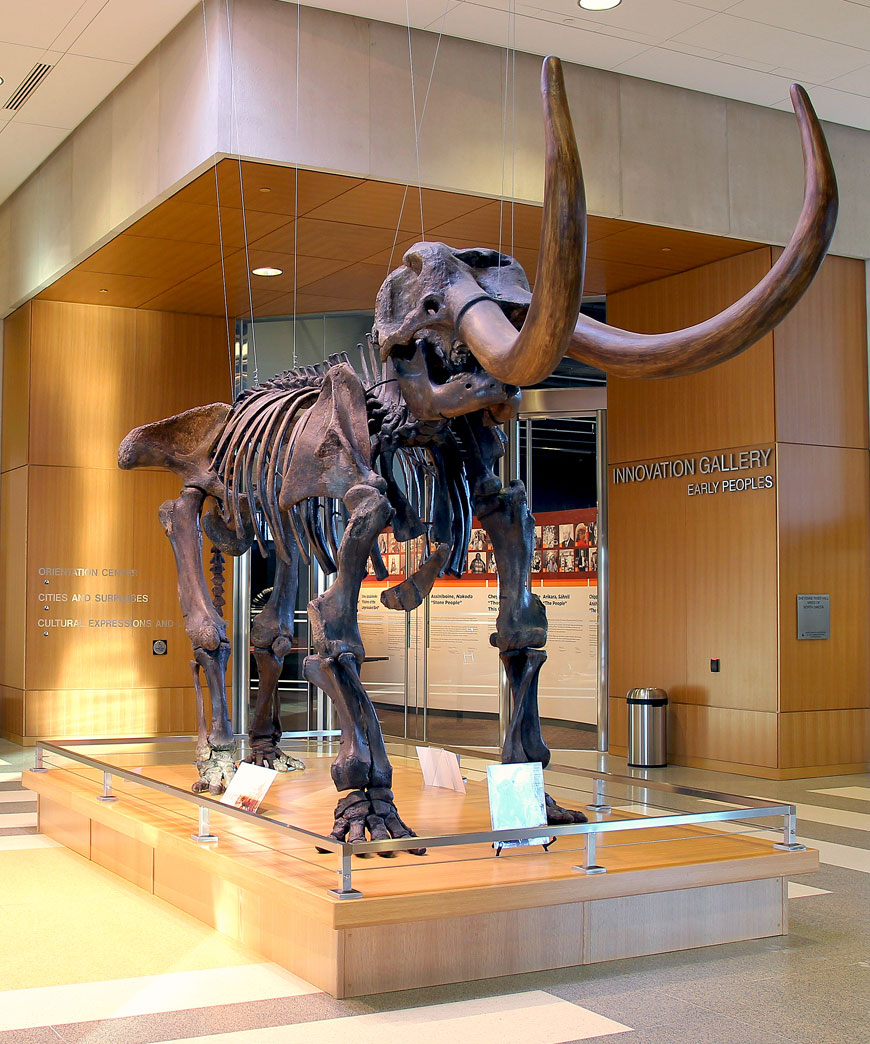
Mastodon skeleton on display in the museum

The North Dakota Heritage Center & State Museum, located on the North Dakota State Capitol grounds in Bismarck, is the state of North Dakota's official history museum. The original building, which was opened in 1981, is operated by the State Historical Society of North Dakota and features permanent and temporary exhibits. In June 2008, the museum became home to a rare mummified Edmontosaurus with fossilized skin.

Expansion of the North Dakota Heritage Center & State Museum finished with a grand opening on November 2, 2014, coinciding with the 125th anniversary of statehood. The expansion added 127,000 square feet of collections storage, labs, and office space, doubling the total size of the museum.

== Overview ==
The North Dakota Heritage Center & State Museum is the federal repository for the state in all collection areas. It is home to the State Archives which is the official repository of state and local government records. It also houses the Johnsrud Paleontology Laboratory and the State Fossil Collection.

The museum features four galleries, two theaters, an outdoor amphitheater, cafe, a children's play area, and museum store. The museum hosts year-round events, programming, and conferences. It also publishes the North Dakota History Journal and several other publications.

== Collections ==
=== State Archives ===
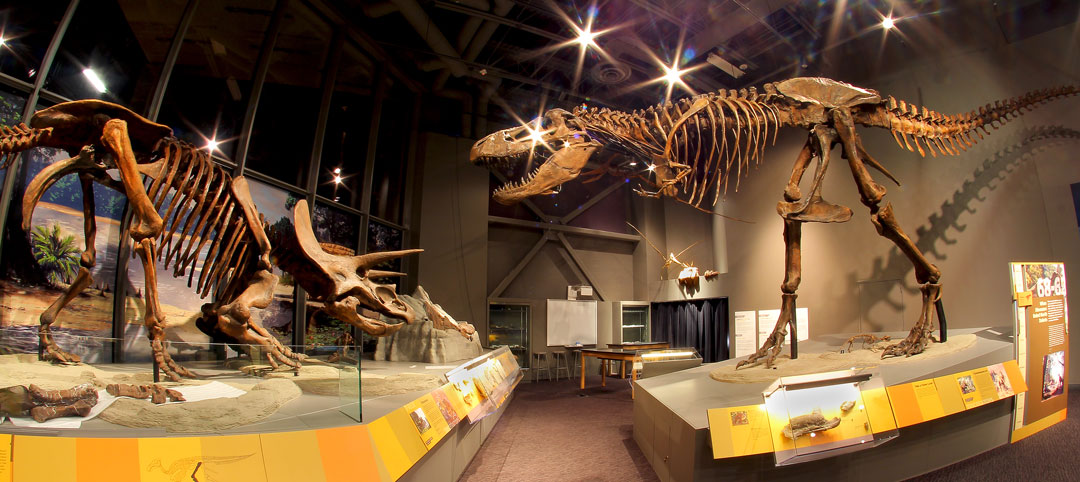
Triceratops and Tyrannosaurs skeletons on display at the North Dakota Heritage Center & State Museum

The State Archives manages storage and preservation for books, periodicals, maps, photographs, manuscripts, newspapers, oral histories and film.

=== Archaeology and historic preservation ===
Collections include millions of artifacts representing more than 12,000 years of human history from across North Dakota. There are also resources files critical to oil, coal, wind, road, and bridge contractors. A statewide network of 56 state historic sites is administered from the North Dakota Heritage Center.

=== Paleontology ===
Specimens include a gem, mineral, and rock collection and the state fossil collection containing millions of specimens ranging in scale from microscopic shells to huge dinosaur bones.

== See also ==
- List of historical societies in North Dakota
