= Fort Mandan =

American frontier fort used by Lewis & Clark

Coordinates: 47°17′53″N 101°5′14″W

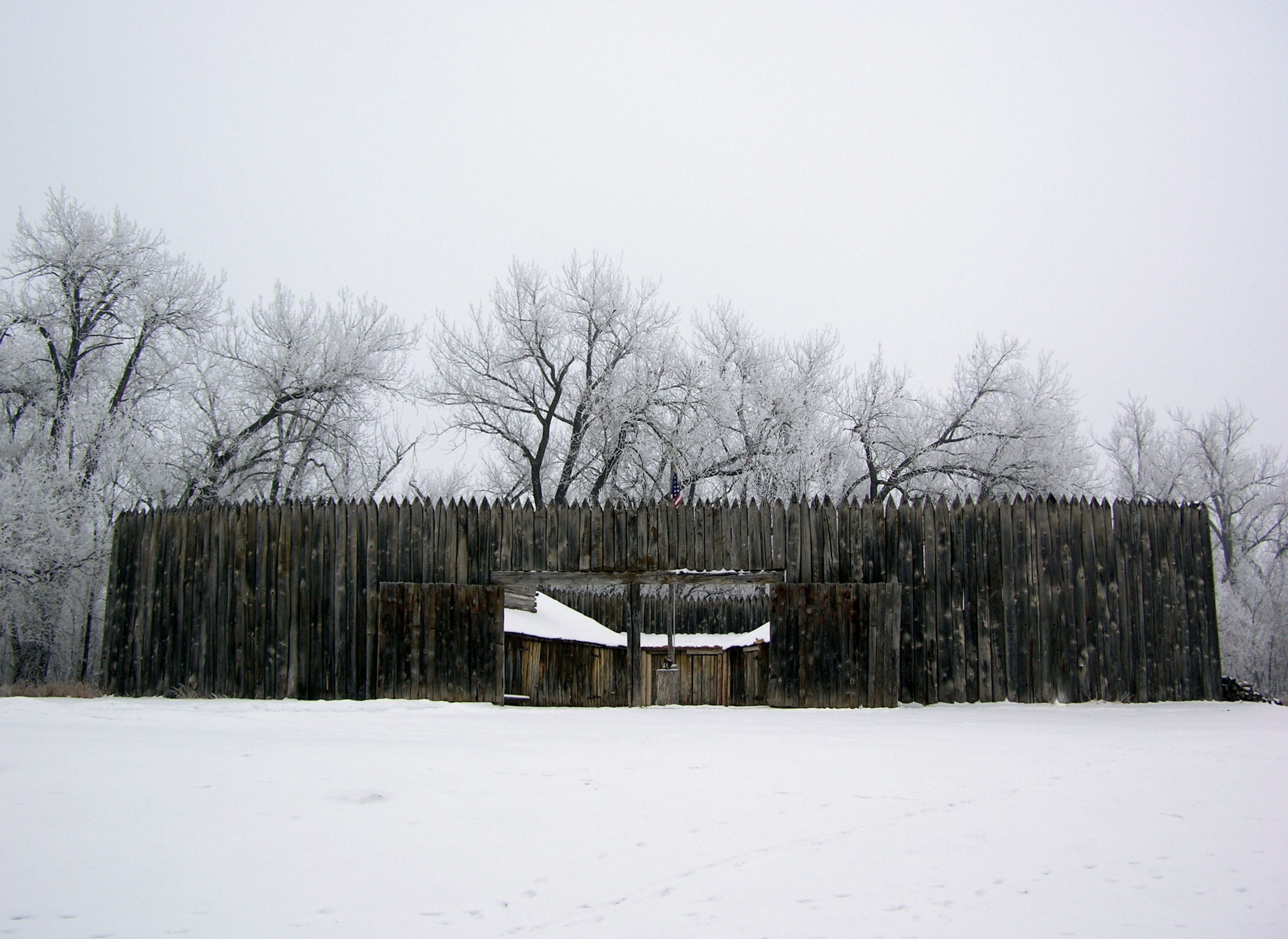
Winter view of reconstructed Fort Mandan, North Dakota

Fort Mandan was the name of the encampment which the Lewis and Clark Expedition built for wintering over in 1804–1805. The encampment was located on the Missouri River approximately twelve miles (19 km) from the site of present-day Washburn, North Dakota, which developed later. The precise location is not known for certain. It is believed now to be under the water of the river. A replica of the fort has been constructed near the original site.

== Construction and conditions ==
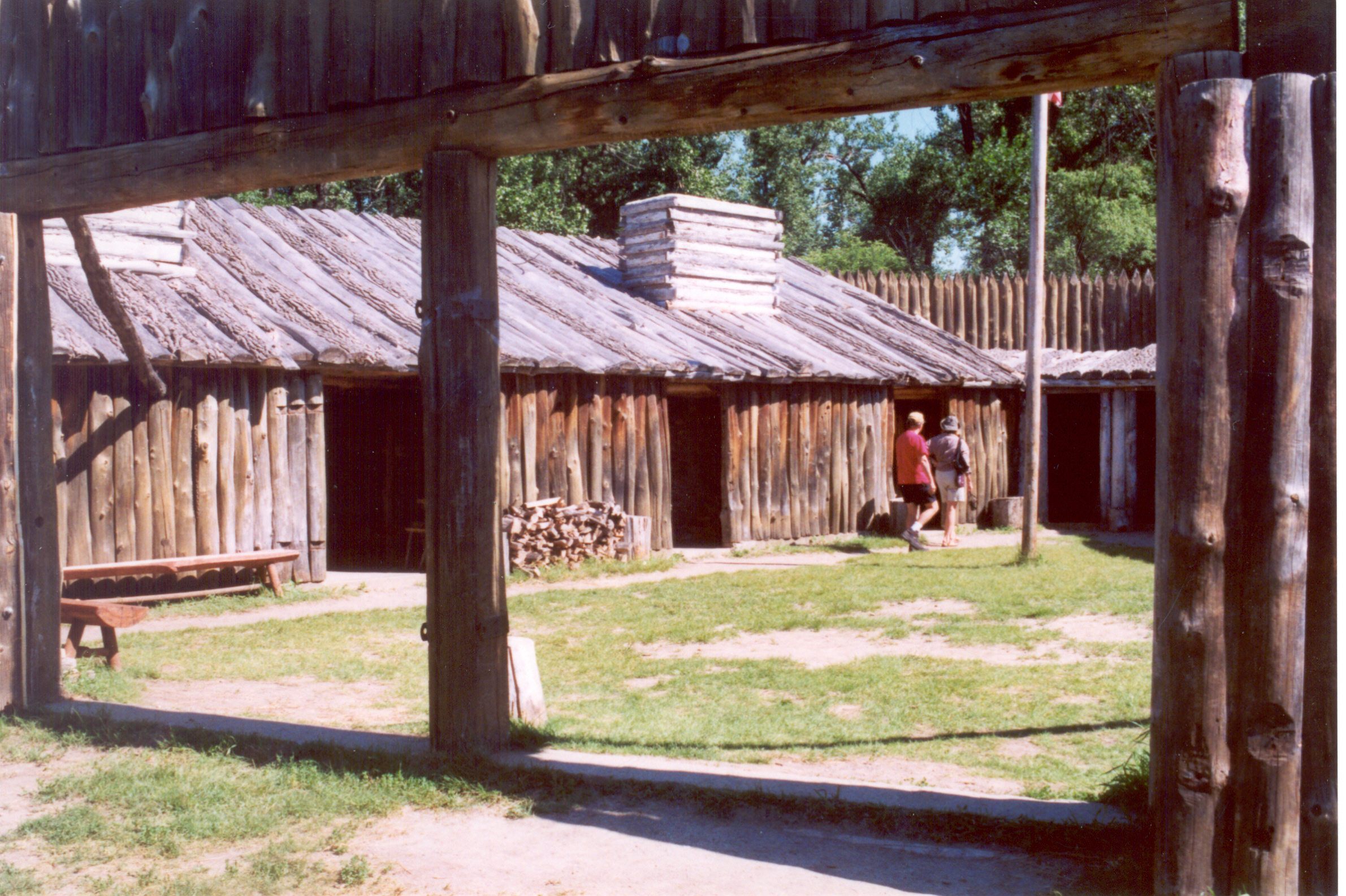
Interior yard of the replica of Fort Mandan, North Dakota

The fort was built of cottonwood lumber cut from the riverbanks. It was triangular in shape, with high walls on all sides, an interior open space between structures, and a gate facing the Missouri River, by which the party would normally travel. Storage rooms provided a safe place to keep supplies. Lewis and Clark shared a room. The men of the Corps of Discovery started the fort on November 2, 1804. Fort Mandan was completed on November 27, 1804. They wintered there until April 6, 1805. According to the journals, they built the fort slightly downriver from the five villages of the Mandan and Hidatsa nations.

The winter was very cold, with temperatures sometimes dipping to −45 °F (−43 °C), but the fort provided some protection from the elements. Several of the men of the expedition suffered frostbite due to the severely cold conditions, which set in after only brief exposure.

== Diplomacy ==
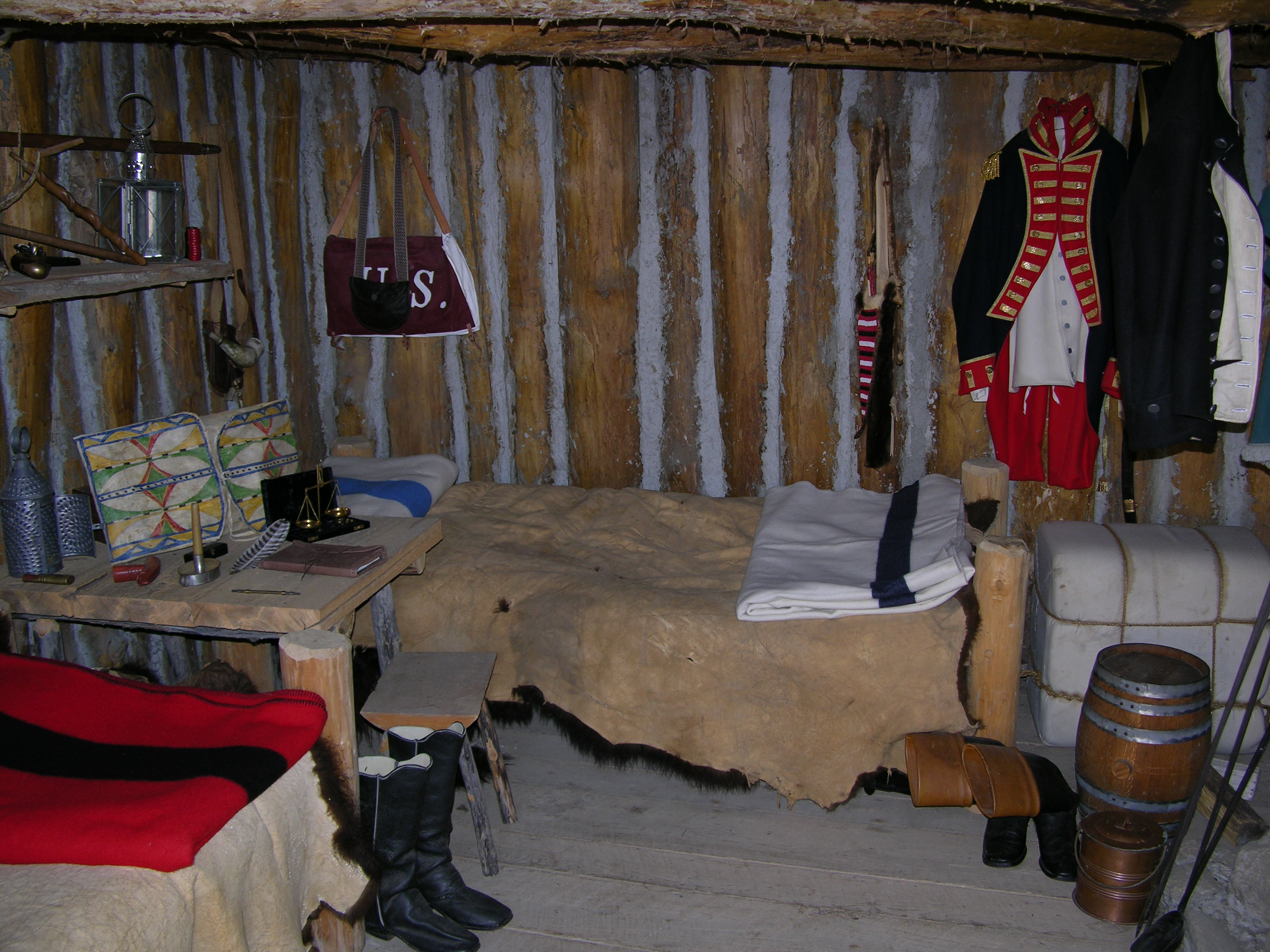
Lewis and Clark's room at the reconstructed fort

In addition to seeking protection during the winter, Captains Meriwether Lewis and William Clark spent much of this period on diplomatic efforts with the several Native American tribes who lived near the fort.

As the expedition was to establish the first official contact between the United States and numerous nations across the territory, President Thomas Jefferson had directed the captains to pursue diplomatic goals. They were to try to establish friendly relations with as many tribes as possible, and to prepare them for the arrival of United States traders to the region. They were also to claim United States territorial sovereignty over the land, which had been occupied by Native Americans for thousands of years. The historic tribes had differing conceptions of property use than did the European Americans.

The Teton people had already shown resistance to the expedition. Lewis and Clark gradually adjusted their goals, working to form alliances with the Arikara, Hidatsa, and Mandan against the Teton.

The Mandan were cautiously favorable toward such an alliance. When the Expedition returned to the area in 1806 while traveling east, the Mandan sent one of their chiefs, Sheheke, on the trip to Washington, D.C. to meet with Thomas Jefferson. But the Mandan did not commit to trading with the United States at the expense of their previous partnership with Great Britain through Canadian traders. The Hidatsa strongly resisted the American diplomatic efforts, often avoiding meeting with Lewis and Clark.

== Preparations for spring travel ==
The Corps spent much time during the winter to prepare for their travel in the spring, repairing equipment, making clothing, processing dried meats, etc. In addition, on the way to their winter site, they had used maps made by previous explorers. From that point on in their westward journey, they would enter territory unfamiliar to Europeans according to known documentation. Clark noted that he gathered information from chief Sheheke about the route to the west in order to make a preliminary map.

Not knowing if they would survive the journey, Lewis and Clark used the winter to compile their descriptions of tributaries of the Missouri River, their observations about the Native nations encountered, and their descriptions of plant and mineral specimens which they had collected. All of this material was compiled into a manuscript which they called the Mandan Miscellany. In the spring the captains sent a copy of the manuscript to government officials in St. Louis via their large keelboat. The boat was planned to return before their expected arrival at the Mandan area in 1806.

== Sacagawea ==
Lewis and Clark appear to have first met Sacagawea at Fort Mandan. Her husband Toussaint Charbonneau served as a Hidatsa interpreter for the expedition, and the journals imply that she lived at the fort with him. Their son Jean Baptiste Charbonneau, whom she kept with her throughout the expedition, was born on February 11, 1805, possibly at the fort.

== 1806 and after ==
When the Corps passed back through the area in August 1806 on their return journey to the East, they found the fort had burnt to the ground. The cause is unknown. Since that time, the Missouri River has slowly eroded the bank and shifted course to the east, eroding away the former site of the fort.

The Lewis and Clark Fort Mandan Foundation built a replica of the fort along the river, 2.5 miles (4.0 km) from the intersection of ND 200A and US 83. Made according to materials and design as described in the expedition's journals, it is located near the North Dakota Lewis and Clark Interpretive Center. The fort replica holds reproduction items, such as "Meriwether Lewis' field desk, William Clark's map-making tools, bunks the men slept in, equipment they carried in the field, clothes they wore, and the blacksmith's forge."

In addition, the site has staff to give tours and interpretive programs about the Lewis and Clark Expedition and its significance in United States, state and regional history. Walking trails go along the property and the river.

== See also ==
- Timeline of the Lewis and Clark Expedition
