= Grassy Butte, North Dakota =

- Unincorporated community
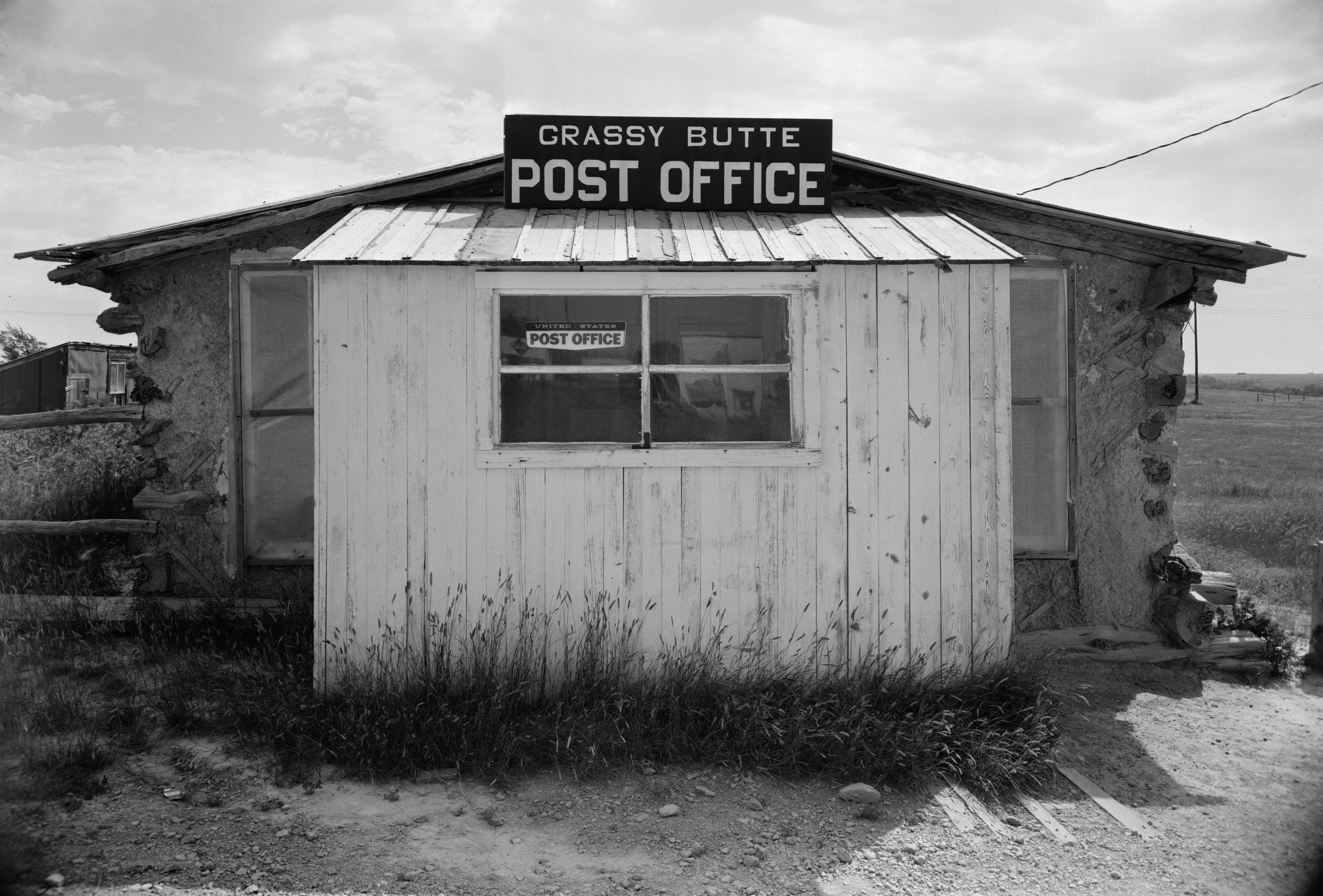
- Built in 1914, the Grassy Butte Post Office is listed on the National Register of Historic Places. Photo taken August 1958.

- Location within North Dakota Location within the United States
- Coordinates: 47°23′33″N 103°14′53″W
- Country: United States
- State: North Dakota
- County: McKenzie
- Elevation: 2,661 ft (811 m)
- Time zone: UTC-6 (Mountain (MDT))
  - Summer (DST): UTC-5 (MDT)
- ZIP codes: 58634
- Area code: 701
- GNIS feature ID: 1034897

Grassy Butte is an unincorporated community in southeastern McKenzie County, North Dakota, United States. It lies along U.S. Route 85, south of the city of Watford City, the county seat of McKenzie County.

Grassy Butte currently has a gas station/convenience store and a bar. The elementary school has closed and the property was sold. The residents now send their children to either Killdeer, Watford City or Belfield schools.

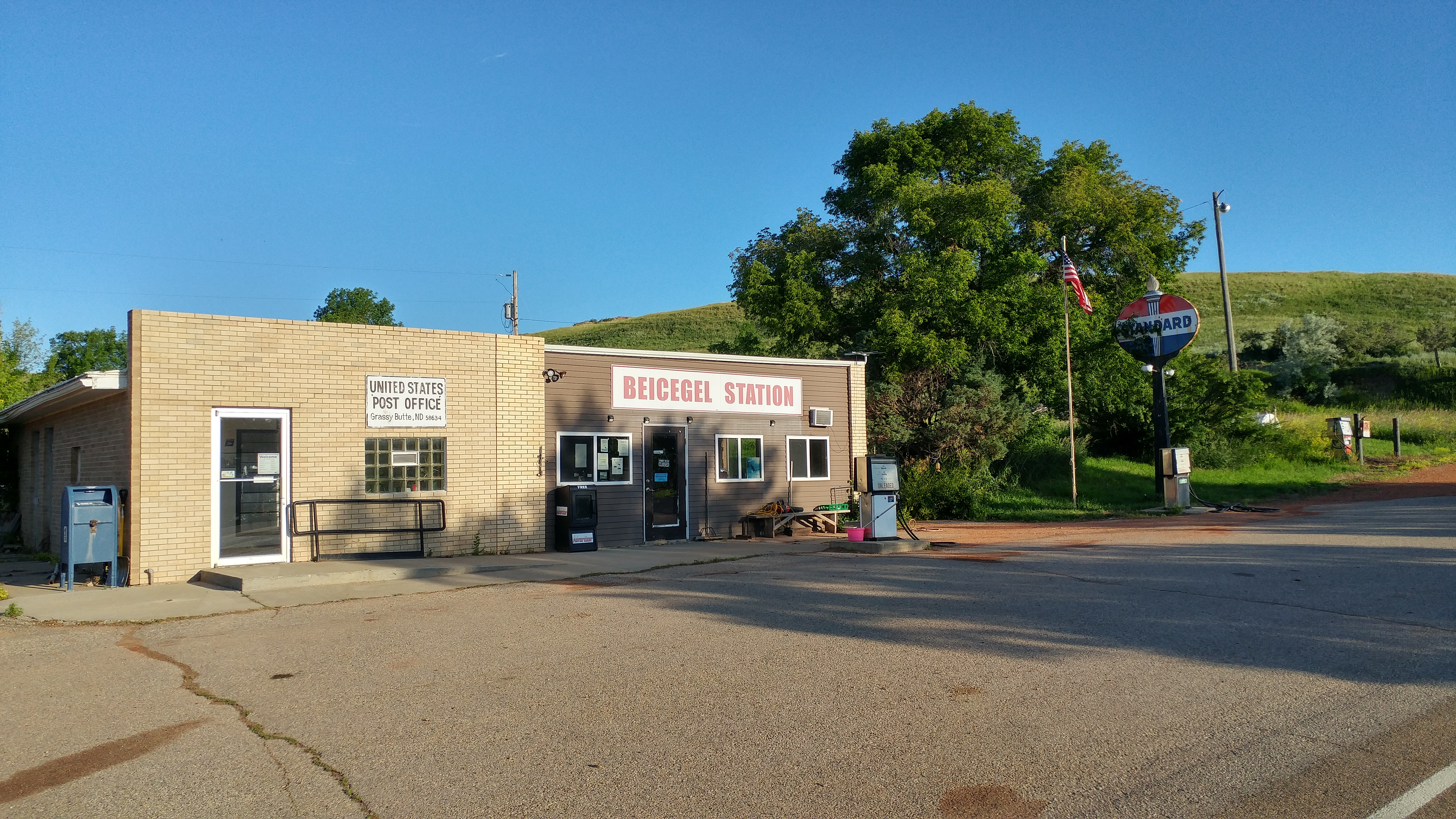
US Post Office and Beicegel Station

Grassy Butte is mentioned in the Leif Enger novel "Peace Like a River" as being where the character Roxanna resides.

The Grassy Butte Post Office, owned by the McKenzie County Historical Society, is listed on the National Register of Historic Places.
