= Grassy Butte Post Office =

- U.S. National Register of Historic Places
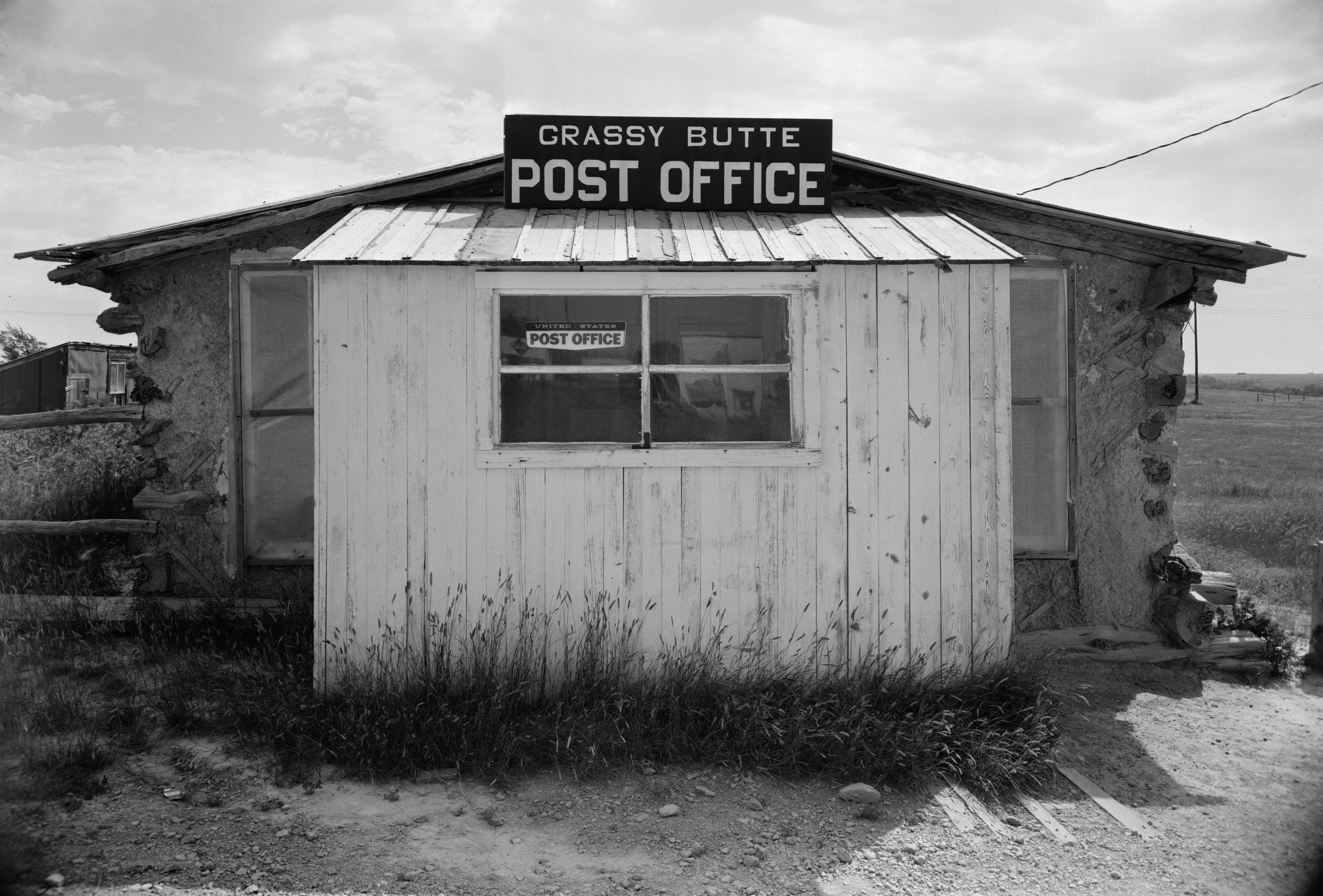
- photo in 1958 by Jack Boucher

- Location within North Dakota Location within the United States
- Location: Off U.S. 85, Grassy Butte, North Dakota
- Coordinates: 47°23′39″N 103°14′48″W
- Area: 5.7 acres (2.3 ha)
- Built: 1914
- Built by: Carl Jagol
- Architectural style: Ukrainian-type log building
- NRHP reference No.: 80002919
- Added to NRHP: November 26, 1980

The Grassy Butte Post Office in Grassy Butte, North Dakota, United States, is a Ukrainian-type log building that was built by Carl Jagol and others in 1914. It was used as a post office for 49 years, until 1963, and was listed on the National Register of Historic Places in 1980, at which time it was owned by the McKenzie County Historical Society.

It is significant as "one of the last known examples of Ukrainian-type log and clay plaster construction in North Dakota. Built in 1914, the post office dates from the main 1890 to 1914 immigration from Ukraine to the United States."

It was noted in its NRHP nomination that, though the building "is widely recognized as an example of pioneer architecture, North Dakotans are generally unaware of the ethnic origins of the building. The inclusion of the post office in the National Register of Historic Places, as well as other examples of vernacular ethnic architecture in North Dakota will serve to illustrate the diverse contributions of ethnic groups to the rural cultural landscape of the state."

It is open as a museum during the summer.
