= Oscar-Zero Missile Alert Facility =

Historic military facility in North Dakota, United States

- U.S. National Register of Historic Places
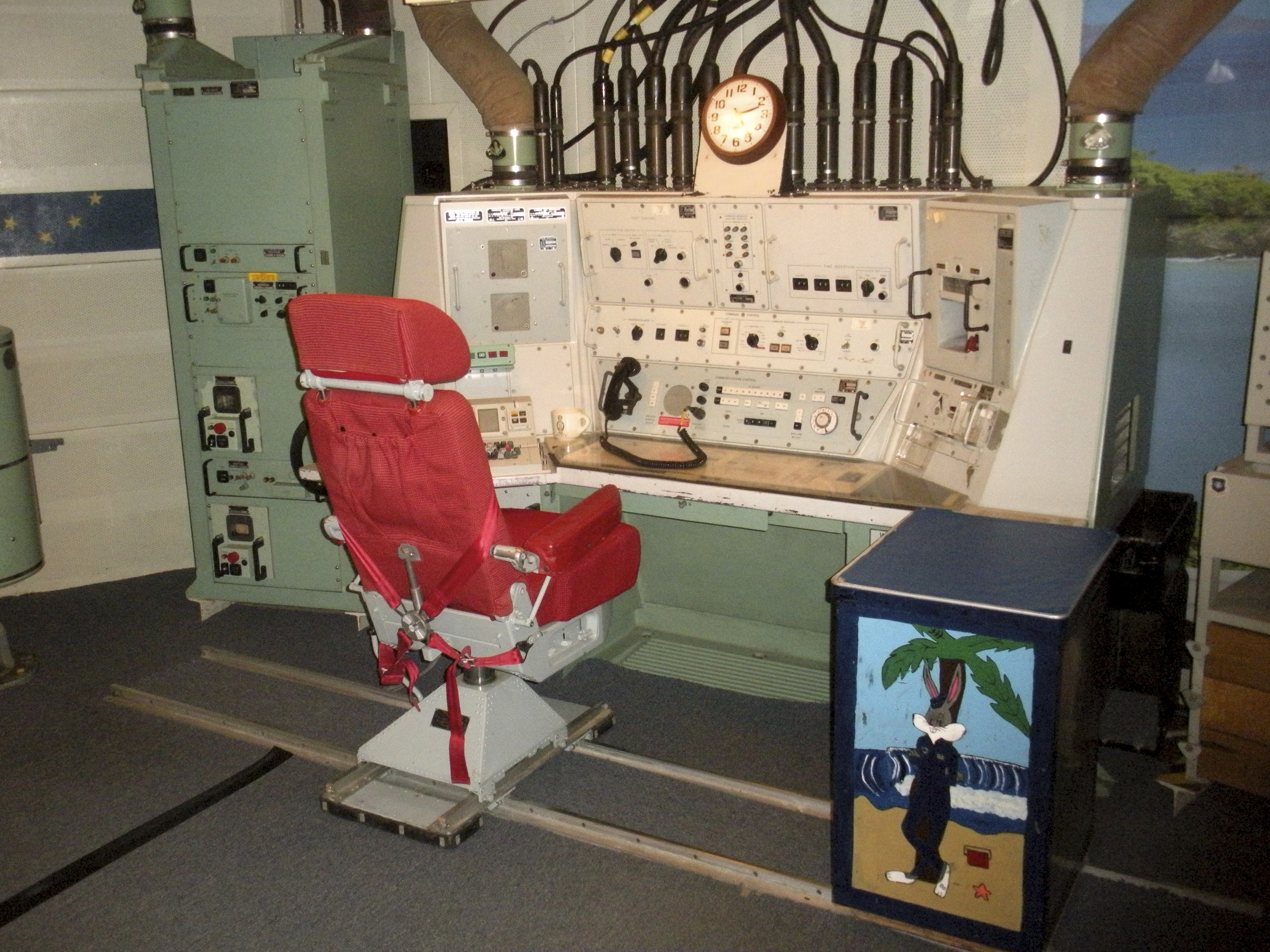
- Oscar-Zero launch control

- Location within North Dakota Location within the United States
- Nearest city: Cooperstown, North Dakota
- Coordinates: 47.4976°N 98.1272°W
- Area: 17 acres (6.9 ha)
- Built by: Ralph M. Parsons, Morrison-Perini-Leavell
- Architectural style: Utilitarian
- NRHP reference No.: 08000994
- Added to NRHP: October 14, 2008

The Oscar-Zero Missile Alert Facility near Cooperstown, North Dakota, US was listed on the National Register of Historic Places in 2008. Also known as Oscar-Zero MAF and as O-0 MAF, it exemplifies Utilitarian architecture. The NRHP listing included 2 contributing buildings, 9 contributing structures, and one contributing object.

It is included in North Dakota's Ronald Reagan Minuteman Missile State Historic Site with the November-33 Launch Facility and is operated by the State Historical Society of North Dakota.
