= Dr. S.W. Hill Drug Store =

- U.S. National Register of Historic Places
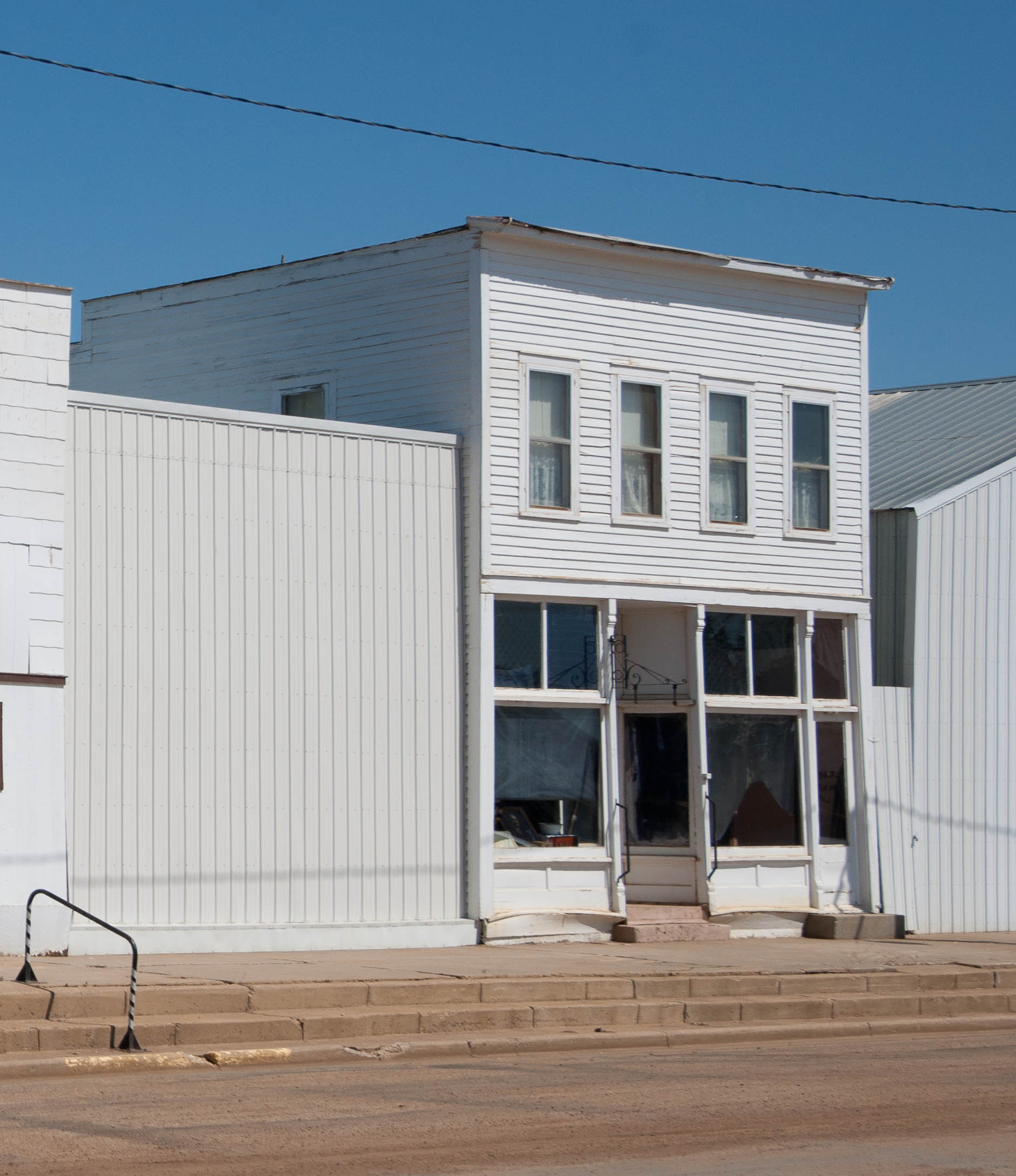
- Building in 2009

- Location within North Dakota Location within the United States
- Location: Off ND 21, Regent, North Dakota
- Coordinates: 46°25′20″N 102°33′20″W
- Area: less than one acre
- Built: 1910
- Built by: Simon, Art
- Architectural style: Early Commercial
- NRHP reference No.: 80002916
- Added to NRHP: November 10, 1980

The Dr. S.W. Hill Drug Store in Regent, North Dakota, United States, was built in 1910. It is one of eight buildings that make up the Hettinger County Historical Society Museum. It is an example of Early Commercial architecture. It was listed on the National Register of Historic Places in 1980. In 1980 it was serving as the Hettinger County Historical Society Museum.
