= McHenry, North Dakota =

- City
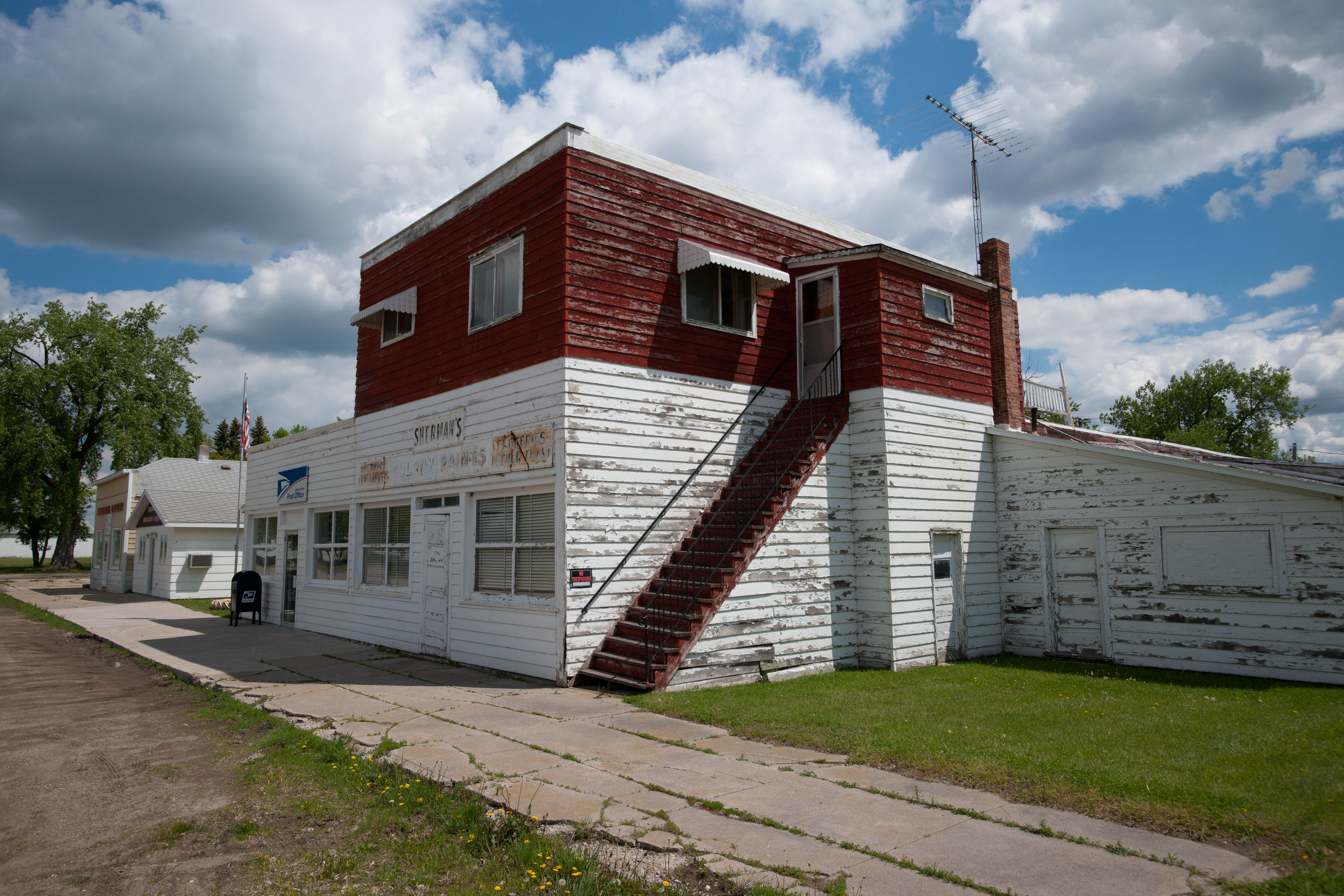
- McHenry in 2009

- Location of McHenry, North Dakota
- Coordinates: 47°34′35″N 98°35′28″W
- Country: United States
- State: North Dakota
- County: Foster
- Founded: 1899

Area
  - Total: 0.25 sq mi (0.64 km^{2})
  - Land: 0.25 sq mi (0.64 km^{2})
  - Water: 0 sq mi (0.00 km^{2})
- Elevation: 1,506 ft (459 m)

Population (2020)
  - Total: 64
  - Estimate (2022): 64
  - Density: 259.9/sq mi (100.36/km^{2})
- Time zone: UTC-6 (Central (CST))
  - Summer (DST): UTC-5 (CDT)
- ZIP Code: 58464
- Area code: 701
- FIPS code: 38-49260
- GNIS feature ID: 1036142

McHenry is a city in Foster County, North Dakota, United States. The population was 64 at the 2020 census. McHenry was founded in 1899.

== Geography ==
According to the United States Census Bureau, the city has a total area of 0.26 square miles (0.67 km^{2}), all land.

== Demographics ==
Historical population
Census	Pop.	Note	%±
1910	398		—
1920	299		−24.9%
1930	219		−26.8%
1940	250		14.2%
1950	189		−24.4%
1960	155		−18.0%
1970	152		−1.9%
1980	113		−25.7%
1990	85		−24.8%
2000	71		−16.5%
2010	56		−21.1%
2020	64		14.3%
2022 (est.)	64		0.0%
U.S. Decennial Census; 2020 Census

=== 2010 census ===
As of the census of 2010, there were 56 people, 31 households, and 20 families residing in the city. The population density was 215.4 inhabitants per square mile (83.2/km^{2}). There were 37 housing units at an average density of 142.3 per square mile (54.9/km^{2}). The racial makeup of the city was 98.2% White and 1.8% from other races. Hispanic or Latino of any race were 1.8% of the population.

There were 31 households, of which 6.5% had children under the age of 18 living with them, 54.8% were married couples living together, 6.5% had a female householder with no husband present, 3.2% had a male householder with no wife present, and 35.5% were non-families. 29.0% of all households were made up of individuals, and 19.4% had someone living alone who was 65 years of age or older. The average household size was 1.81 and the average family size was 2.10.

The median age in the city was 71.3 years. 5.4% of residents were under the age of 18; 1.8% were between the ages of 18 and 24; 10.7% were from 25 to 44; 17.9% were from 45 to 64; and 64.3% were 65 years of age or older. The gender makeup of the city was 46.4% male and 53.6% female.

=== 2000 census ===
As of the census of 2000, there were 71 people, 36 households, and 27 families residing in the city. The population density was 276.0 inhabitants per square mile (106.6/km^{2}). There were 45 housing units at an average density of 174.9 per square mile (67.5/km^{2}). The racial makeup of the city was 98.59% White, and 1.41% from two or more races. Hispanic or Latino of any race were 1.41% of the population.

There were 36 households, out of which 11.1% had children under the age of 18 living with them, 66.7% were married couples living together, 5.6% had a female householder with no husband present, and 25.0% were non-families. 22.2% of all households were made up of individuals, and 19.4% had someone living alone who was 65 years of age or older. The average household size was 1.97 and the average family size was 2.22.

In the city, the population was spread out, with 8.5% under the age of 18, 4.2% from 18 to 24, 12.7% from 25 to 44, 26.8% from 45 to 64, and 47.9% who were 65 years of age or older. The median age was 64 years. For every 100 females, there were 91.9 males. For every 100 females age 18 and over, there were 85.7 males.

The median income for a household in the city was $26,250, and the median income for a family was $27,813. Males had a median income of $57,917 versus $27,917 for females. The per capita income for the city was $14,702. There were 4.3% of families and 16.7% of the population living below the poverty line, including 100.0% of under eighteens and 5.4% of those over 64.

== Climate ==
This climatic region is typified by large seasonal temperature differences, with warm to hot (and often humid) summers and cold (sometimes severely cold) winters. According to the Köppen Climate Classification system, McHenry has a humid continental climate, abbreviated "Dfb" on climate maps.

Climate data for McHenry 3W, North Dakota (1991–2020 normals, extremes 1909–present)
Month	Jan	Feb	Mar	Apr	May	Jun	Jul	Aug	Sep	Oct	Nov	Dec	Year
Record high °F (°C)	53 (12)	63 (17)	83 (28)	98 (37)	102 (39)	103 (39)	108 (42)	107 (42)	104 (40)	94 (34)	76 (24)	66 (19)	108 (42)
Mean daily maximum °F (°C)	16.6 (−8.6)	21.4 (−5.9)	34.4 (1.3)	52.0 (11.1)	66.5 (19.2)	75.7 (24.3)	80.8 (27.1)	79.8 (26.6)	70.7 (21.5)	54.3 (12.4)	36.3 (2.4)	21.9 (−5.6)	50.9 (10.5)
Daily mean °F (°C)	7.6 (−13.6)	12.0 (−11.1)	25.1 (−3.8)	40.8 (4.9)	54.5 (12.5)	64.6 (18.1)	69.3 (20.7)	67.7 (19.8)	58.5 (14.7)	43.6 (6.4)	27.5 (−2.5)	13.9 (−10.1)	40.4 (4.7)
Mean daily minimum °F (°C)	−1.3 (−18.5)	2.6 (−16.3)	15.7 (−9.1)	29.7 (−1.3)	42.4 (5.8)	53.5 (11.9)	57.8 (14.3)	56.6 (13.7)	46.4 (8.0)	32.9 (0.5)	18.8 (−7.3)	5.8 (−14.6)	30.0 (−1.1)
Record low °F (°C)	−45 (−43)	−44 (−42)	−36 (−38)	−13 (−25)	11 (−12)	19 (−7)	35 (2)	28 (−2)	12 (−11)	−5 (−21)	−29 (−34)	−42 (−41)	−45 (−43)
Average precipitation inches (mm)	0.55 (14)	0.48 (12)	0.83 (21)	1.20 (30)	2.73 (69)	3.55 (90)	3.64 (92)	2.55 (65)	2.11 (54)	1.81 (46)	0.88 (22)	0.81 (21)	21.14 (537)
Average snowfall inches (cm)	11.4 (29)	9.4 (24)	8.2 (21)	4.3 (11)	0.9 (2.3)	0.0 (0.0)	0.0 (0.0)	0.0 (0.0)	0.0 (0.0)	2.5 (6.4)	8.8 (22)	14.3 (36)	59.8 (152)
Average precipitation days (≥ 0.01 in)	6.4	5.8	5.4	6.3	8.7	10.1	9.2	7.9	6.9	6.8	5.5	6.9	85.9
Average snowy days (≥ 0.1 in)	6.2	5.3	3.7	1.7	0.3	0.0	0.0	0.0	0.1	1.2	4.1	7.2	29.8
Source: NOAA

== See also ==
- Killing of Cayler Ellingson – 2022 homicide in North Dakota
