= Washburn, North Dakota =

- City
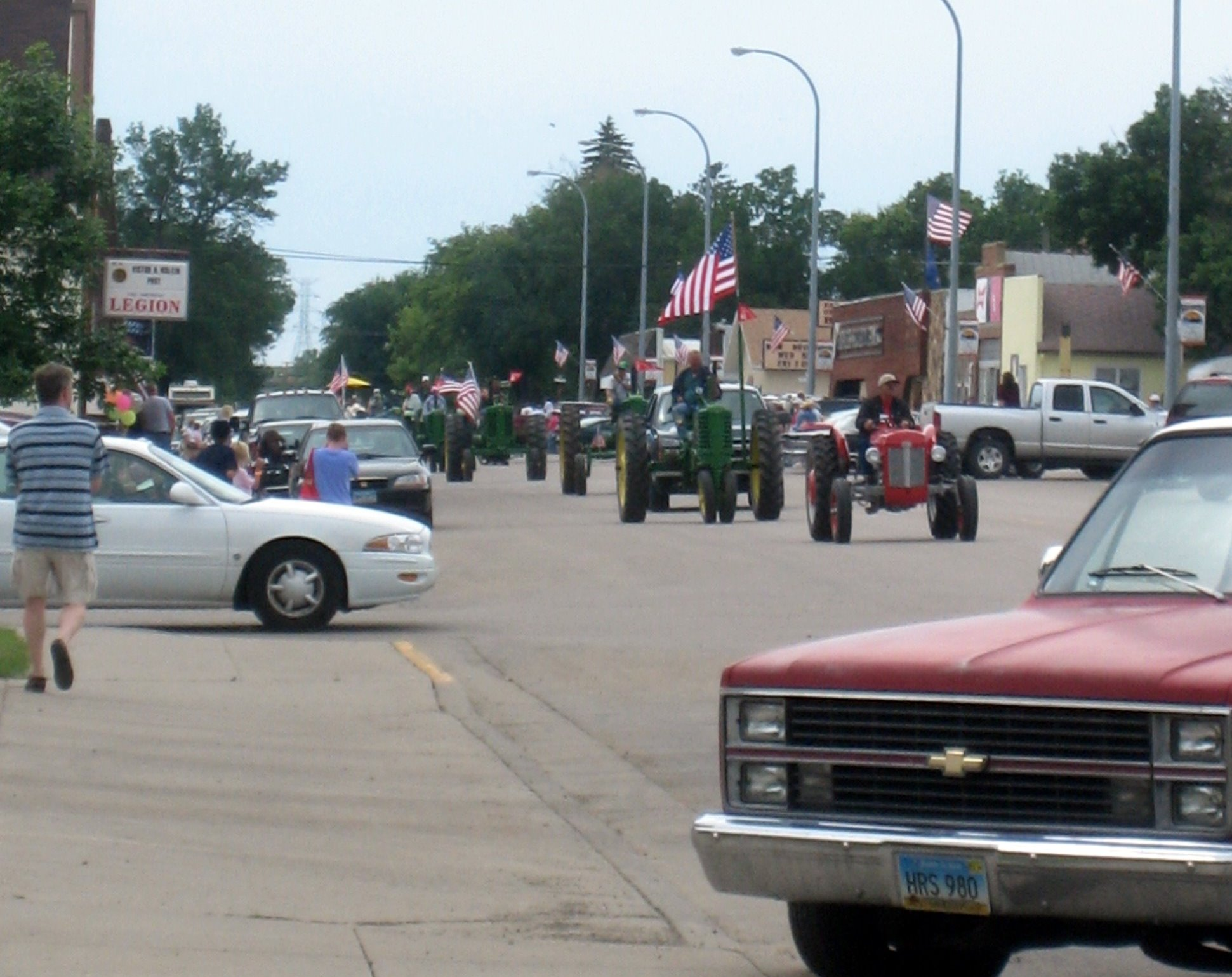
- 2007 Tractor Trek traveling down Main Ave. in Washburn

- Logo
- Motto: "The Grandest Little City on the Missouri-Washburn, North Dakota"
- Coordinates: 47°17′31″N 101°01′40″W
- Country: United States
- State: North Dakota
- County: McLean
- Founded: 1882

Government
  - Commission President: Larry Thomas

Area
  - Total: 1.79 sq mi (4.63 km^{2})
  - Land: 1.68 sq mi (4.36 km^{2})
  - Water: 0.10 sq mi (0.27 km^{2})
- Elevation: 1,831 ft (558 m)

Population (2020)
  - Total: 1,300
  - Estimate (2022): 1,289
  - Density: 771.7/sq mi (297.96/km^{2})
- Time zone: UTC-6 (Central (CST))
  - Summer (DST): UTC-5 (CDT)
- ZIP code: 58577
- Area code: 701
- FIPS code: 38-83700
- GNIS feature ID: 1036316
- Highways: US 83, US 83 Bus., ND 200 Alt.
- Website: washburnnd.com

Washburn is a city in southern McLean County, North Dakota, United States. Located along the upper Missouri River, it is the county seat of McLean County. The population was 1,300 at the 2020 census.

Washburn was founded in 1882 near the former site of Fort Mandan, winter quarters of the Lewis and Clark Expedition in 1804–1805, near a Mandan village. The town was designated as the county seat in 1883. The city's name honors General Cadwallader C. Washburn.

Washburn is home to the North Dakota Lewis and Clark Interpretive Center, which focuses on the Expedition's winter near the Mandan village. It houses a full-scale replica of Fort Mandan, which workers of the expedition built as their base, and one of the expedition's canoes.

== Geography ==
According to the United States Census Bureau, the city has a total area of 1.89 square miles (4.90 km^{2}), of which 1.80 square miles (4.66 km^{2}) is land and 0.09 square miles (0.23 km^{2}) is water.

=== Climate ===
Climate data for Washburn, North Dakota (1991–2020)
Month	Jan	Feb	Mar	Apr	May	Jun	Jul	Aug	Sep	Oct	Nov	Dec	Year
Mean daily maximum °F (°C)	22.0 (−5.6)	27.1 (−2.7)	39.5 (4.2)	55.4 (13.0)	66.9 (19.4)	76.4 (24.7)	82.9 (28.3)	82.7 (28.2)	73.4 (23.0)	57.0 (13.9)	40.1 (4.5)	26.8 (−2.9)	54.2 (12.3)
Daily mean °F (°C)	12.0 (−11.1)	16.1 (−8.8)	28.5 (−1.9)	42.6 (5.9)	54.4 (12.4)	64.2 (17.9)	70.0 (21.1)	68.8 (20.4)	59.4 (15.2)	44.7 (7.1)	29.7 (−1.3)	17.8 (−7.9)	42.4 (5.7)
Mean daily minimum °F (°C)	2.1 (−16.6)	5.0 (−15.0)	17.6 (−8.0)	29.8 (−1.2)	41.9 (5.5)	52.0 (11.1)	57.1 (13.9)	54.8 (12.7)	45.5 (7.5)	32.3 (0.2)	19.4 (−7.0)	8.8 (−12.9)	30.5 (−0.8)
Average precipitation inches (mm)	0.39 (9.9)	0.47 (12)	0.56 (14)	1.49 (38)	2.82 (72)	3.24 (82)	2.49 (63)	2.20 (56)	1.46 (37)	1.41 (36)	0.69 (18)	0.45 (11)	17.67 (448.9)
Average snowfall inches (cm)	7.2 (18)	6.4 (16)	6.9 (18)	4.1 (10)	0.9 (2.3)	0.0 (0.0)	0.0 (0.0)	0.0 (0.0)	0.0 (0.0)	2.4 (6.1)	6.6 (17)	8.6 (22)	43.1 (109.4)
Source: NOAA

== Demographics ==
Historical population
Census	Pop.	Note	%±
1910	657		—
1920	558		−15.1%
1930	753		34.9%
1940	901		19.7%
1950	913		1.3%
1960	993		8.8%
1970	804		−19.0%
1980	1,767		119.8%
1990	1,506		−14.8%
2000	1,389		−7.8%
2010	1,246		−10.3%
2020	1,300		4.3%
2022 (est.)	1,289		−0.8%
U.S. Decennial Census; 2020 Census

=== 2010 census ===
As of the census of 2010, there were 1,246 people, 551 households, and 369 families living in the city. The population density was 692.2 inhabitants per square mile (267.3/km^{2}). There were 661 housing units at an average density of 367.2 per square mile (141.8/km^{2}). The racial makeup of the city was 98.0% White, 0.1% African American, 0.6% Native American, 0.5% from other races, and 0.9% from two or more races. Hispanic or Latino of any race were 1.1% of the population.

There were 551 households, of which 25.4% had children under the age of 18 living with them, 59.3% were married couples living together, 4.4% had a female householder with no husband present, 3.3% had a male householder with no wife present, and 33.0% were non-families. 29.6% of all households were made up of individuals, and 10% had someone living alone who was 65 years of age or older. The average household size was 2.25 and the average family size was 2.76.

The median age in the city was 46.2 years. 21.7% of residents were under the age of 18; 4.6% were between the ages of 18 and 24; 22.2% were from 25 to 44; 35.9% were from 45 to 64; and 15.7% were 65 years of age or older. The gender makeup of the city was 51.3% male and 48.7% female.

=== 2000 census ===
As of the census of 2000, there were 1,389 people, 557 households, and 407 families living in the city. The population density was 781.8 inhabitants per square mile (301.9/km^{2}). There were 659 housing units at an average density of 370.9 per square mile (143.2/km^{2}). The racial makeup of the city was 98.78% White, 0.72% Native American, 0.22% from other races, and 0.29% from two or more races. Hispanic or Latino of any race were 0.50% of the population.

There were 557 households, out of which 36.4% had children under the age of 18 living with them, 63.4% were married couples living together, 6.6% had a female householder with no husband present, and 26.9% were non-families. 25.1% of all households were made up of individuals, and 10.8% had someone living alone who was 65 years of age or older. The average household size was 2.49 and the average family size was 2.96.

In the city, the population was spread out, with 28.4% under the age of 18, 5.2% from 18 to 24, 27.3% from 25 to 44, 26.3% from 45 to 64, and 12.9% who were 65 years of age or older. The median age was 40 years. For every 100 females, there were 102.2 males. For every 100 females age 18 and over, there were 98.2 males.

The median income for a household in the city was $40,789, and the median income for a family was $54,250. Males had a median income of $47,500 versus $21,364 for females. The per capita income for the city was $19,726. About 5.9% of families and 8.6% of the population were below the poverty line, including 10.5% of those under age 18 and 12.7% of those age 65 or over.

== Notable people ==
- Jean Baptiste Charbonneau was born in 1804 at Fort Mandan to Sacagewea, a young Shoshone woman, and Toussaint Charbonneau, a French Canadian. As an infant, he was taken along by his mother on her travels with the Lewis and Clark Expedition. He became an explorer and interpreter, fluent in French, English, Shoshone, and other Native American languages
- Clint Hill, Secret Service agent assigned to Jacqueline Kennedy, raised in Washburn
- Ernie Kell, mayor of Long Beach, California from 1984 to 1994
- Bruce Peterson, NASA test pilot, born in Washburn
- Joseph Henry Taylor (1844–1908), author, newspaper editor, and frontiersman
- Homer N. Wallin, World War II era Vice-Admiral in the U.S. Navy, born in Washburn

== Climate ==
This climatic region is typified by large seasonal temperature differences, with warm to hot (and often humid) summers and cold (sometimes severely cold) winters. According to the Köppen Climate Classification system, Washburn has a humid continental climate, abbreviated "Dfb" on climate maps.

== Education ==
It is within the Washburn Public School District 4.
