= End of the Trail (Wanlass) =

Public sculpture in Oregon

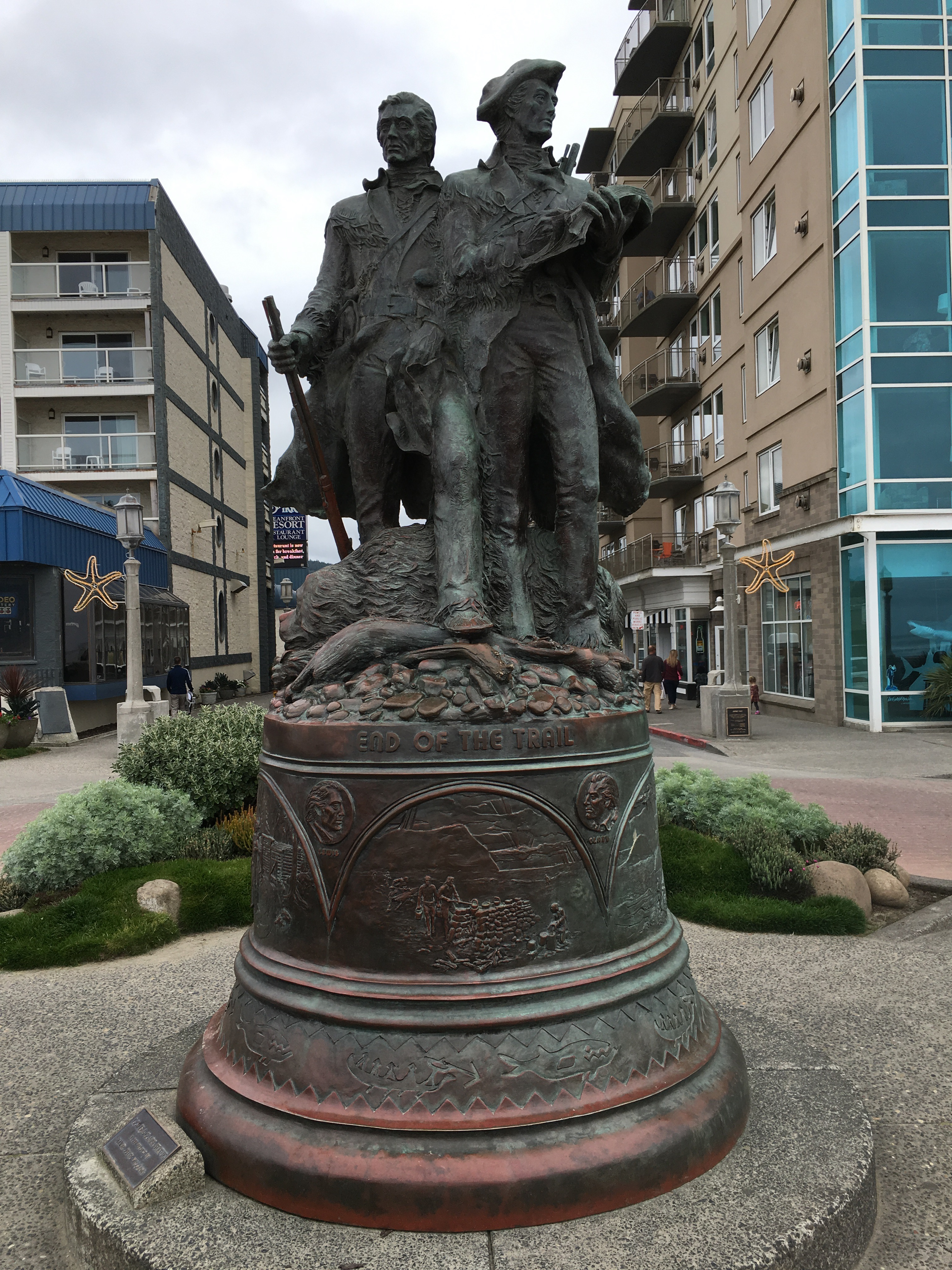
- The memorial in 2017
- Artist: Stanley Wanlass
- Medium: Bronze sculpture
- Subject: Meriwether Lewis; William Clark; Seaman
- Location: Seaside, Oregon, U.S.
- 45°59′35.46″N 123°55′48.69″W

A bronze sculpture depicting Meriwether Lewis, William Clark, and Seaman by Stanley Wanlass, sometimes called End of the Trail, is installed in Seaside, Oregon, United States. The memorial was installed in 1990 and marks the end of the Lewis and Clark Trail. According to the National Park Service, the "End of the Trail Lewis and Clark Commemorative Statue" honors the Corps of Discovery and Lewis and Clark Expedition.
