= End of the Trail =

End of the Trail may refer to:

- End of the Trail (1932 film), an American Western film
- End of the Trail (1936 film), an American Western film
- End of the Trail (Fraser), a sculpture by James Earle Fraser in Waupun, Wisconsin, US
- End of the Trail (Wanlass), a sculpture by Stanley Wanlass in Seaside, Oregon, US
- The End of the Trail, a 2000 Hardy Boys novel
- The End of the Trail Museum, at the Trees of Mystery park near Klamath, California, US

== See also ==
- Trail's End (disambiguation)
