= Trail's End =

Trail's End, or variations, may refer to:

== Arts and Entertainment ==
- "Trail's End", a 1957 episode of American TV series Sugarfoot
- "Trail's End", a 1994 episode of The Joy of Painting with Bob Ross
- "The Trail's End" or "The Story of Bonnie and Clyde", a poem by Bonnie Parker
- Trails End, a 1949 American western film
- Trails End (1935 film), a 1935 American western film

== Other uses ==
- Trail End, a historic home in Sheridan, Wyoming, NRHP-listed
- Trail's End (brand), a popcorn brand sold by the Boy Scouts of America and Scouts Canada
- Trail's End (Denver, Colorado), a Denver landmark
- Trail's End Kentucky Straight Bourbon Whiskey, or simply Trail's End
- Trailsend, Kettering, Ohio, NRHP-listed in Montgomery County, Ohio

== See also ==
- End of the Trail (disambiguation)
