= Keelboat =

Small ballasted sailing yacht

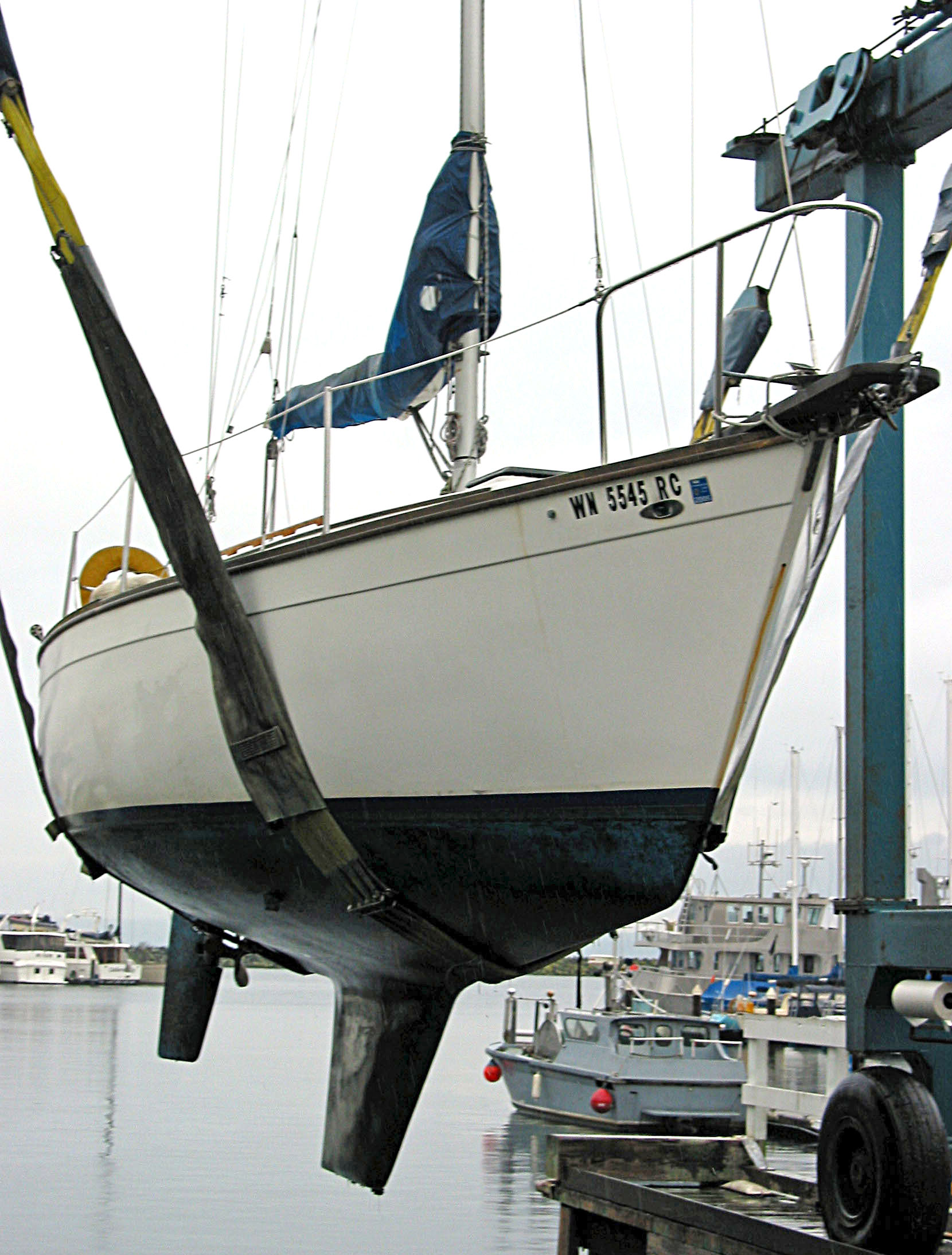
A recreational keelboat with a fin keel

A keelboat is a sailboat with a keel and ballast to help keep the boat upright, as opposed to a dinghy. It typically has a cabin with accommodation for crew. Although there can be some overlap, they are generally larger than dinghies, which are not ballasted and do not have cabins. Most modern keelboats often have fixed fin keels, and considerable draft, but shoal draft or lifting keel designs also exist.

The term was also used in the 1800s in North America for flatboats such as the galley used for the Lewis and Clark Expedition, and in Great Britain for working boats such as the Humber Keel.

Keelboats are widely used in competition, for example:

- The Sun Fast 30 One Design is used for the Offshore Double Handed World Championship.
- The Star was an Olympic class from 1932–2012 and still has world championships.
- IMOCA 60s are used for the Vendée Globe, a solo round the world race.
- A mixed fleet is used in the Fastnet Race and the Sydney to Hobart Yacht Race.
- Inshore racing classes include the J/70, Melges 24, Etchells, and others.

Keelboats are the dominant form in recreational cruising, examples being the C&C 30, the Catalina 30, and Beneteau's Oceanis models.
