= Seaman (dog) =

Newfoundland dog on the Lewis and Clark Expedition

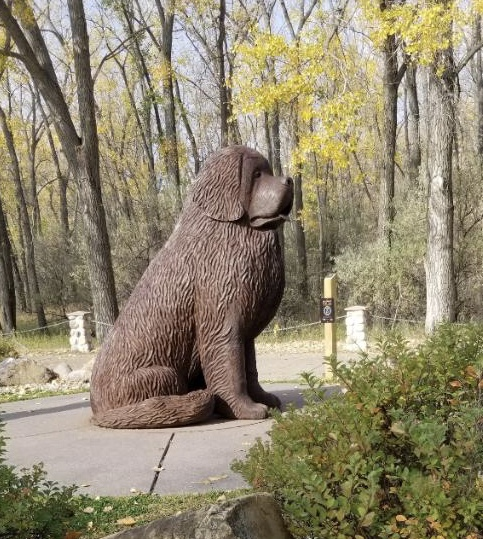
- Statue of Seaman at Fort Mandan, North Dakota
- Species: Canis familiaris
- Breed: Newfoundland
- Sex: Male
- Born: Pittsburgh, Pennsylvania (purchased)
- Died: after 1806
- Years active: 1803–1806
- Known for: Participation in Lewis and Clark Expedition.
- Owner: Meriwether Lewis
- Offspring: None known
- Weight: 150 lb (68 kg) (estimated)

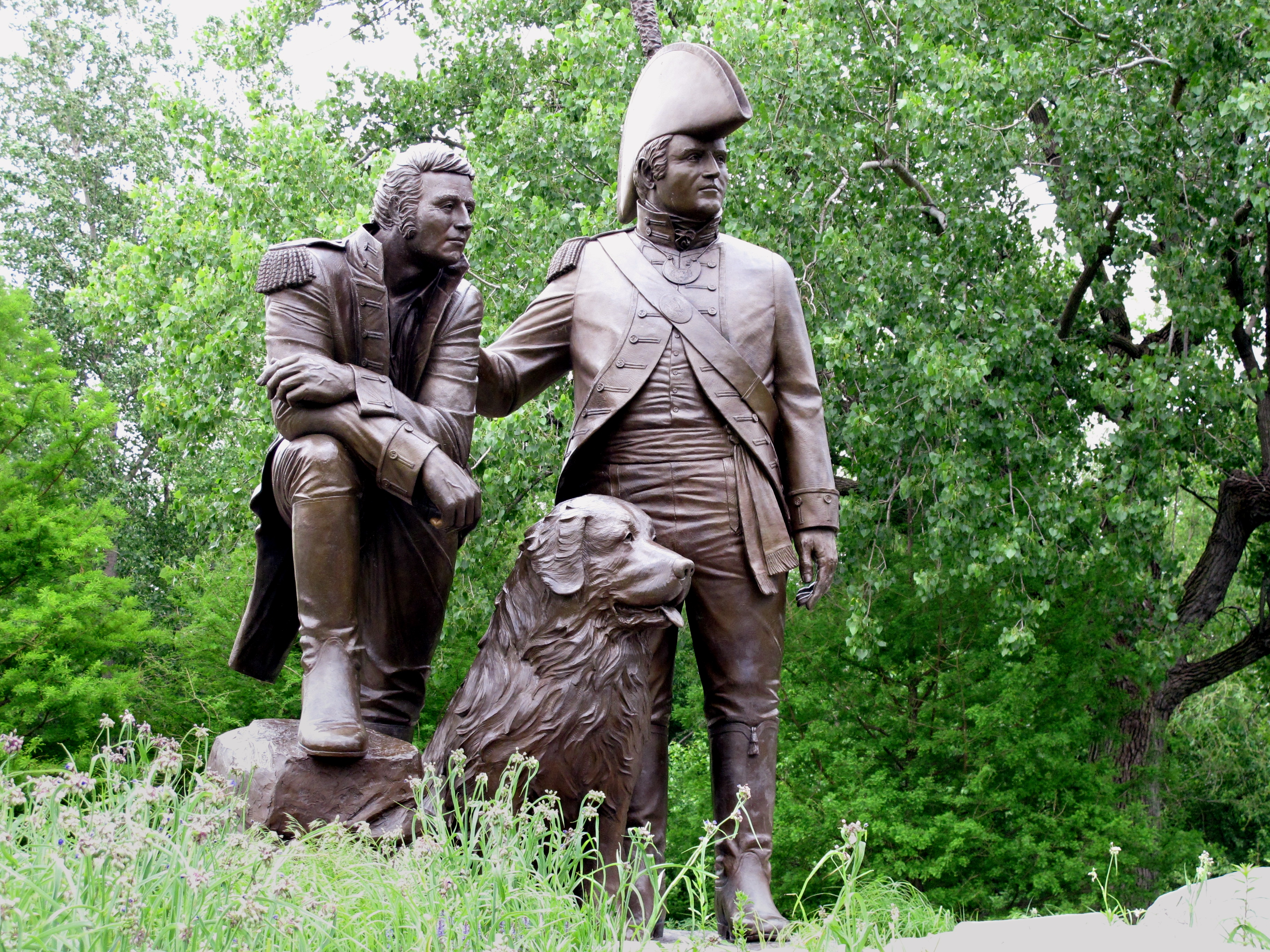
Statue of Seaman with Lewis and Clark in St. Charles, Missouri

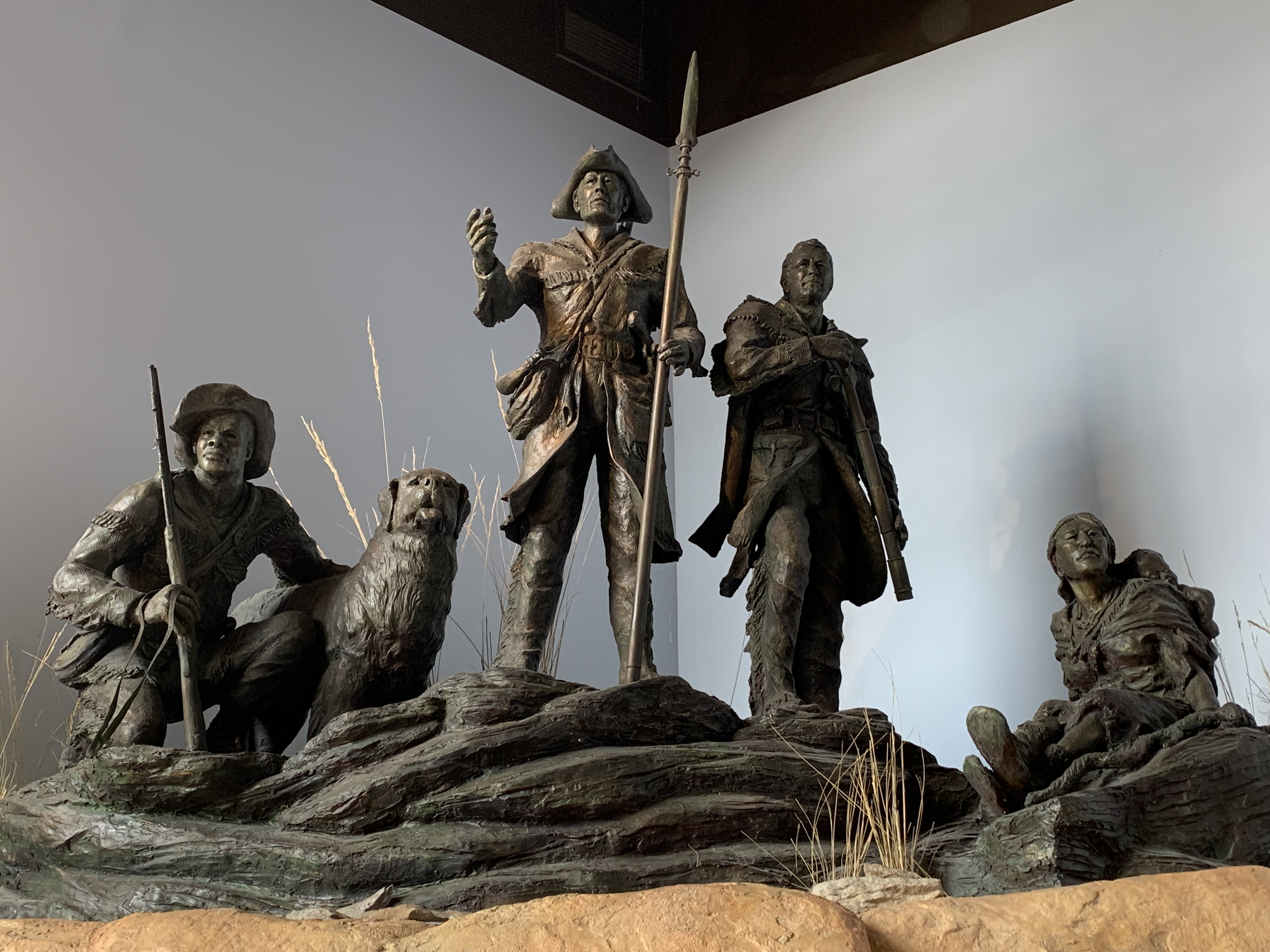
Left to right: York, Seaman, Lewis, Clark, and Sacagawea with her baby Pompey, statue by Robert Scriver, in the Lewis and Clark National Historic Trail Interpretative Center, Great Falls, Montana.

Seaman, a Newfoundland dog, was a member of the Lewis and Clark Expedition, the first trip from the Mississippi River to the Pacific coast and back. He was the only animal to complete the entire three-year trip.

Seaman was purchased in 1803 specifically for the expedition by Captain Meriwether Lewis, while he was in Pittsburgh, Pennsylvania, awaiting completion of the boats for the voyage. He chose a Newfoundland, whose estimated weight is 150 pounds (68 kg) and for which he paid the high price of $20 (equivalent to $430 in 2025): half a month's pay for an Army captain. Working dogs, strong and easy to handle—Lewis describes Seaman as "docile"—, he chose a Newfoundland because they do well on boats, are good swimmers, and can assist in water rescues. His name reflects this.

There is no explicit description of Seaman's color or appearance. He is nowadays universally depicted as black or dark brown, the colors of most modern Newfoundlands, but a survey by an art historian of the breed as it was depicted in paintings of the early nineteenth century found "not a single all-black [that] was called a Newfoundland". "In fact, all the early 19th century illustrations which I have found, and whose color I could authenticate[,] were white with black or dark areas and frecklings."

== Seaman on the expedition ==
Seaman did many things to help the explorers, and they became fond of him. He was "our dog".

I made my dog take as many [squirrels] each day as I had occasion for, they wer fat and I thought them when fryed a pleasant food. ...my dog...would take the squirrel in the water and kill them and swimming bring them in his mouth to the boat.

He also retrieved geese and deer, and once killed and retrieved an antelope swimming across a river.

According to Lewis and Clark's report, some Native Americans were impressed by the dog's "sagacity" (wisdom, obedience); they had never seen such a big dog. The dog "patrolled all night" to warn of bears, and once had to drive off a buffalo in their camp while the men slept.

A modern commentator on the Expedition remarked that "Lewis seems to have been happiest when he was alone on shore with his gun, his notebook, and his dog Seaman."

During the expedition, around May 14, 1805, Captains Meriwether Lewis and William Clark performed surgery on one of Seaman's arteries in his hind leg that had been severed by a beaver bite. In early 1806, as the expedition was beginning the return journey, Seaman was stolen by Native Americans and Lewis sent three men to retrieve the dog. Lewis and Clark's Corps of Discovery ate over 200 dogs, bought from the Native Americans, while traveling the Lewis and Clark Trail, in addition to their horses, but Seaman was spared.

The final reference to Seaman in the expedition journals, recorded by Lewis on July 15, 1806, states that "[T]he musquetoes continue to infest us in such manner that we can scarcely exist... My dog even howls with the torture he experiences from them."

== Seaman after the expedition ==
Seaman survived the expedition, and Lewis took the dog home with him to St. Louis. He is reported to have refused food and died of grief after Lewis's premature death. According to a contemporary historian:

After the melancholy exit of Gov. Lewis, his dog would not depart for a moment from his lifeless remains; and when they were deposited in the earth no gentle means could draw him from the spot of interment. He refused to take every kind of food which was offered him, and actually pined away and died with grief upon his master's grave!

According to the same historian, in 1814 Seaman's collar was in an Alexandria, D.C., museum and bore the inscription:

The greatest traveller of my species
My name is SEAMAN
the dog of captain Meriwether Lewis
whom I accompanied to the Pacifick Ocean
through the interior of the continent of North America

== The mistaken name "Scannon" ==
Due to a transcription error in Lewis' journals, the dog was once thought to have been named Scannon. However, during Donald Jackson's 1984 study of Lewis and Clark place-names in Montana—every expedition member got something named after him—he found that Lewis had named a tributary of the Blackfoot River Seaman's Creek (now Monture Creek) and concluded that the true name of the dog was "Seaman".

== Honors ==
In 2008, Seaman became the official mascot of Lewis & Clark College's Pioneers. He was proposed unsuccessfully for State Historical Dog of Missouri.

Monuments to or including Seaman:

- A 20 inches (510 mm) bronze sculpture of Meriweather Lewis accompanied by Seaman, "Lewis the Naturalist", by Chinese-American sculptor Kwan Wu, was reported in 2000 to have been on permanent display at the White House. It was located in the hall just outside the room where Lewis and President Jefferson often ate meals.
- A tablet, similar to a tombstone, stands in front of the Custom House in Cairo, Illinois. link
- At the National Quilt Museum in Paducah, Kentucky, sculptor George Lundeen (William Clark once owned the land the museum is on.)
- In front of the Missouri State Capitol, Jefferson City, Missouri
- Case Park in Kansas City, Missouri
- Fort Atkinson State Historical Park in Fort Calhoun, Nebraska. It is the site of Lewis and Clark's first contact with Native Americans, and the monument includes statues of them in addition to Lewis, Clark, and Seaman.
- A carved wood statue, "Capt. Lewis and Seaman", is located in Gladstone Park, Wausa, Nebraska.
- Lewis and Clark Interpretive Center in Sioux City, Iowa
- A steel, 6 feet (1.8 m) statue of Seaman looks over the Missouri River at Fort Mandan, near the North Dakota Lewis and Clark Interpretive Center, Washburn, North Dakota. Sculptor is Tom Neary.
- Milltown, Montana, sculptor Jim Rogers
- Overlook Park and the Lewis and Clark National Historical Interpretative Center, both in Great Falls, Montana, sculptor Joe Halko
- Fort Clatsop National Memorial in Seaside, Oregon. There is a separate reference to a statue of Lewis, Clark, and Seaman at The Turnaround in Seaside.
- Cascade Locks Marine Park in Cascade Locks, Oregon
- Columbia View Park, behind the Columbia County Courthouse, in Saint Helens, Oregon
- Seaman Dog Park, part of the Sacagawea Interpretative, Cultural, & Educational Center in Salmon, Idaho.
- Other monuments and statues that include Seaman can be found in St. Louis, Missouri, St. Charles, Missouri, Lincoln, Nebraska, and Washougal, Washington.

== See also ==
- List of individual dogs

== Creative literature about Seaman ==
- Yates, Laura Lee (2016). Bound for the Western Sea : The Canine Account of the Lewis & Clark Expedition. There is a companion CD of period and original music, performed by Harry Harpoon & friends, and also titled Bound for the Western Sea. Paonia, CO: Undaunted Press. ISBN 9780997349108.

== Children's books about Seaman (by date) ==
- Bramstedt, Christine Turpin (1988). Ballad of Seaman : dog of the Lewis and Clark expedition. Alton, IL: Stimark Publications. OCLC 22425384.
- Smith, Roland (1999). The Captain's Dog : My journey with the Lewis and Clark tribe. San Diego: Harcourt, Brace. ISBN 9780152019891.
- Karwoski, Gail (1999). SeaMan: The Dog Who Explored the West with Lewis and Clark. Atlanta, Georgia: Peachtree. ISBN 9781561451906.
- Albers, Everett C.; Eslinger, Kimberly (1999). Lewis and Clark meet the American Indians, as told by Seaman the dog. Bismarck, ND. ISBN 9780967400204.
- Albers, Everett C. (2000). Lewis and Clark animal ABC book : as told by Seaman the dog. Bismarck, ND. ISBN 9780967400235.
- Albers, Everett C.; Holmberg, James J. (2002). The saga of Seaman : the story of the dog who went with Lewis & Clark : Seaman's tale in verse. Introduction by James J. Holmberg. Bismarck, ND: Northern Lights, ND Press. ISBN 9780971718104.
- Myers, Laurie (2002). Lewis and Clark and me : a dog's tale. New York: Scholastic. ISBN 9780439474849.
- Eubank, Patti Reeder (2002). Seaman's journal : on the trail with Lewis and Clark. Nashville, Tennessee: Ideals Children's Books. ISBN 9780824954420.
- Albert, Kathy (2002). Dog of discovery. Austin, Texas: Kids Read Press. ISBN 9780972258128.
- Young, Robert (2003). Passage : A Dog's Journey West with Lewis and Clark. Eugene, Oregon: Mad Dog Press. ISBN 9780974219608.
- Lowe, Vicky Daffin; Lowe, Lester D. (2003). Dog gone West : the story of Lewis and Clark and a dog named Seaman. Lewiston, Idaho: North Central Idaho Travel Association. ISBN 9780974390208.
- Smith, Dona (2004). Cross-Country with Lewis and Clark. Seaman has a journal and narrates the expedition. New York: Scholastic. ISBN 0439434416.
- Wolf, Allan (2007). New Found Land. Cambridge, Massachusetts: Candlewick Press. ISBN 9780763632885. OCLC 1245636900.
- Couchman, Linda Jessie; Hailey, Linda Marie; Warner, Linda Sue (2007). Seaman's journey with Lewis and Clark. Ballwin, Missouri: The Quiet Man Foundation. ISBN 9780974934112.
- Pringle, Laurence P. (2008). Dog of discovery : a Newfoundland's adventures with Lewis and Clark. Read on 4 CDs. There is no printed book. Prince Frederick, MD: Recorded Books. ISBN 9781436163903.
- Moss, Helen (2019). Seaman and the great Northern adventure. New York: Godwin Books, Henry Holt and Company. ISBN 9781250186355.

== Teaching material ==
- The Seaman Expedition: The Corps of Discovery through the Eyes of Meriwether Lewis’s Dog, Seaman Frontier Army Museum, Fort Leavenworth, KS.
