= Monture Creek =

Stream in Powell County, Montana, US

Monture Creek Seaman Creek
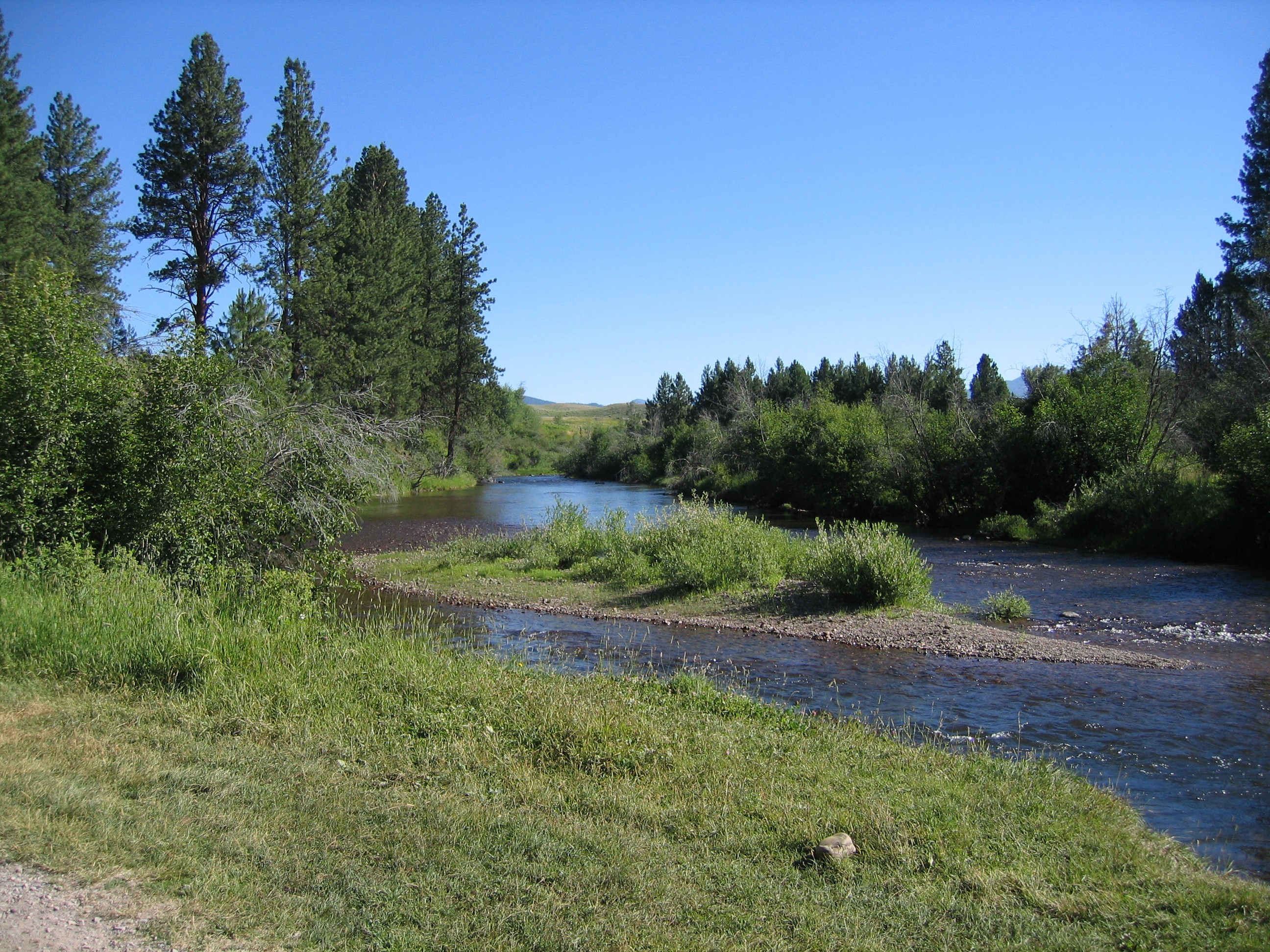
- Etymology: George Monture

Location
- Country: United States
- State: Montana
- District: Powell County
- Municipality: Ovando, Montana

Physical characteristics
- Source: Unknown
  - coordinates: 47.30118°N 113.25018°W
- 2nd source: Middle Fork Monture Creek
  - coordinates: 47.26702°N 113.17855°W
- 3rd source: East Fork Monture Creek
  - coordinates: 47.24412°N 113.15600°W
- Mouth: Blackfoot River
  - coordinates: 47.01992°N 113.23578°W
- Length: 29 m (95 ft)

Basin features
- River system: Blackfoot

Monture Creek is a creek in Powell County, Montana, United States. The creek offers recreational opportunities such as fishing, hiking and camping.

== History ==
Around 5 June 1806, Meriwether Lewis was exploring the area and named the creek Seaman Creek, after his Newfoundland dog, Seaman. However, the creek was later renamed to Monture Creek for George Monture, a trader who lived in the area. Monture was later killed by Sam Pierre on the North Fork of the Blackfoot River as a result over an argument about a keg of whiskey. Today, a marker can be found on his grave at the Ovando Cemetery that was erected in the 1920s by John Blair.

== Description ==
The Monture Creek loses elevation slowly. As a result, the creek encompasses a long and deep valley for most of its course. The stream itself generally contains light riffles and pools, and flows in a very low gradient area after entering a small valley. The creek's bed is composed of mostly made up of sand, gravel and cobble.

== Watercourse ==
Monture Creek begins its course in the Scapegoat Mountains. It then flows southeast where Middle Fork Monture Creek joins it. It then drops south for a while until Shoup Creek, where it continues southwest. It continues gradually flowing southwest until it reaches Montana Highway 200, where it then goes sharply west. The creek than reaches the Monture Creek Fishing Access Site and continues southwest until it joins the Blackfoot River.

== Species ==
Monture Creek contains eleven fish species, with eight being native to the state of Montana. They are brook trout, brown trout, bull trout, longnose dace, longnose sucker, mountain whitefish, rainbow trout, redside shiner, Rocky Mountain sculpin, slimy sculpin and Westslope cutthroat trout. The creek is especially known for its Westslope cutthroat trout numbers as it is a key spawning creek for the species. The creek is also well known for its containment of the bull Trout, a somewhat rare species.

== Activities ==
Monture Creek is mainly known for its camping and excellent fly-fishing opportunities, but it offers additional activities as well. The creek, due to its great valley conditions, offers hiking. Additionally, the creeks conditions make kayaking and paddle boarding available as well.
