= Columbia View Park =

Public park in Gresham, Oregon, U.S.

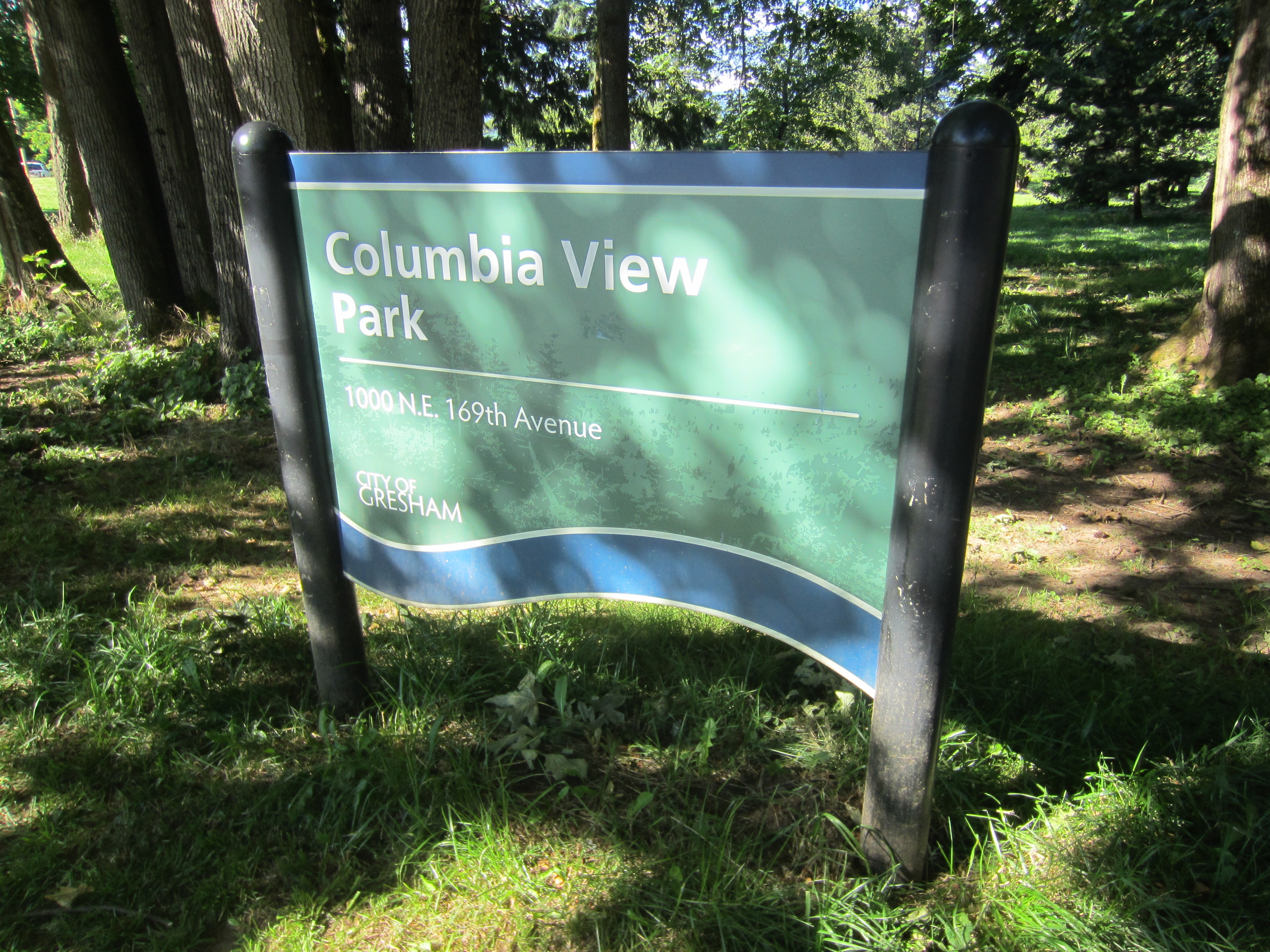
- Park sign, 2022
- Interactive map of Columbia View Park
- Location: Gresham, Oregon, U.S.
- Coordinates: 45°31′48″N 122°29′17″W

Columbia View Park is a 7.5-acre (3.0 ha) undeveloped public park in the Wilkes East neighborhood of Gresham, Oregon, United States.

== Concept plan ==
In a concept plan detailed by the City of Gresham: a pitch, a community garden, a dog park, gravel & paved pathways, two picnic shelters and a viewpoint were shown as potentials features for a development to the park. As of 2025, it’s remained a mostly barren field.
