= Lewis and Clark's keelboat =

1803 expedition galley

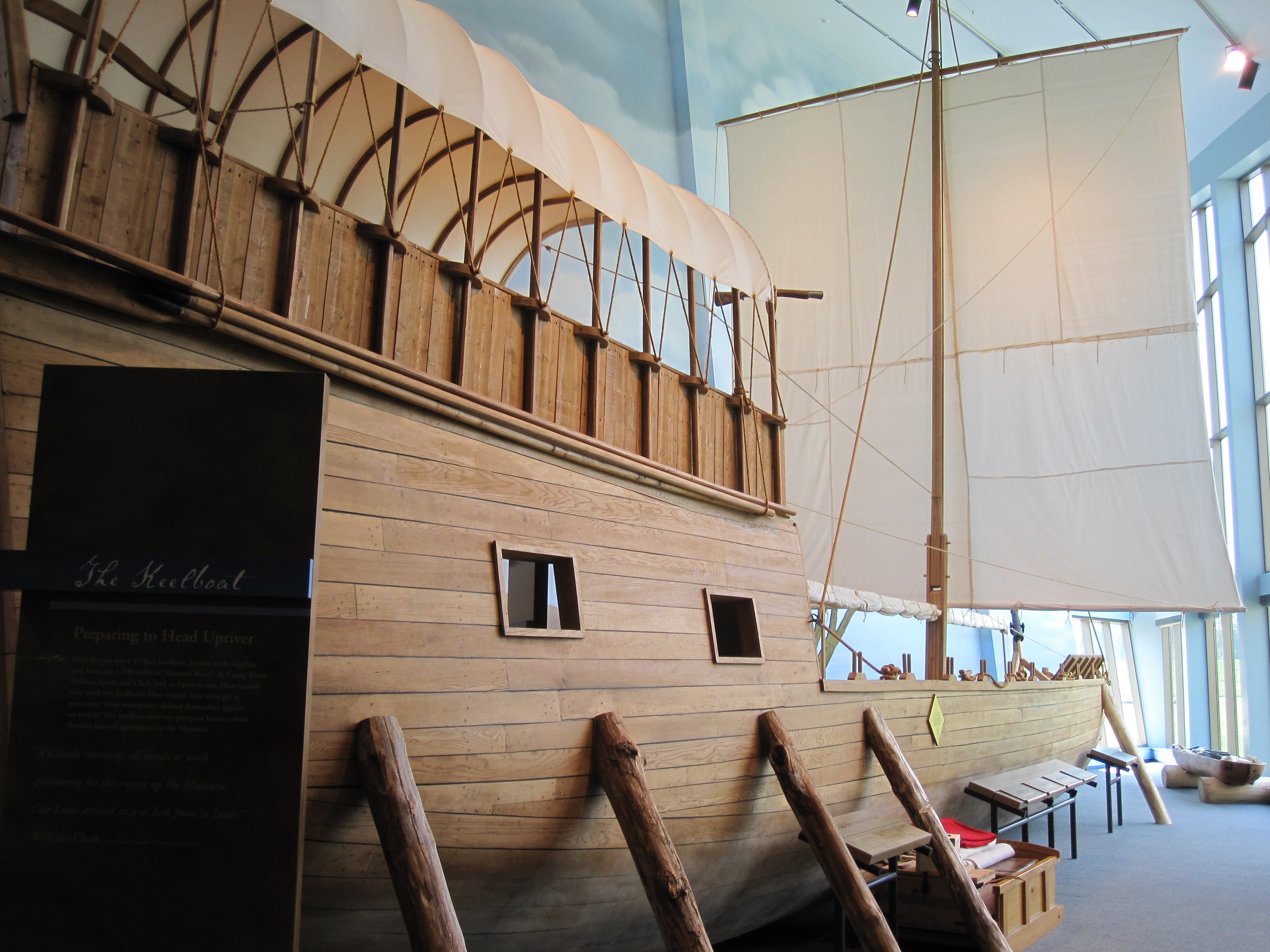
- A replica of the keelboat on display at the Lewis and Clark State Historic Site in 2009.

History

United States
- Builder: Jacob Myers of Pittsburgh, designed by Meriwether Lewis
- Launched: 1803

General characteristics
- Type: Galley
- Tonnage: 12 ton (11,000 kg)
- Length: 55 feet (17 m)
- Beam: 100 inches (250 cm)
- Height: 32 feet at mast
- Draft: 3 feet
- Propulsion: Square rigged mainsail, headsail, 20 oars
- Sail plan: 1 mast
- Capacity: 12 tons
- Crew: 1 captain as commander, 1 sergeant as helmsman, 1 sergeant as centerman, 1 sergeant and 1 private as bowsmen, 22 privates as oarmen
- Armament: 1 swivel gun and 2 blunderbusses

Lewis and Clark's keelboat was built as a galley in Pittsburgh in 1803 for the Lewis and Clark Expedition, after detailed specifications by Meriwether Lewis. A keelboat, it could be propelled by oars, sails, poles and towlines. The boat was the expedition's main vessel until the spring of 1805, when it was returned to St. Louis.

== History ==
In May 1803, Lewis ordered that a riverboat, built to defined specifications, be built at Pittsburgh for the expedition. When he arrived at Pittsburgh, he found that the boat builder had just begun building the boat and that it would take six weeks to finish it. The builder was an alcoholic, being one of the reasons the boat was finished late. This worried Lewis, who wanted to get underway in the vessel before the summer drought lowered the water level of the Ohio River, and to reach the Mississippi River before it froze in the fall.

Lewis finally sailed from Pittsburgh with the boat on August 31, 1803. After joining William Clark, the expedition left Clarksville, Indiana, on October 26, with the flagship and two pirogues. Two weeks after the departure from Clarksville, the expedition arrived at Fort Massac. On November 28, it reached Fort Kaskaskia, 50 miles (80 km) south of St. Louis.

The winter was spent at Camp Dubois, a temporary camp on the Illinois side of the Mississippi, across from the Missouri River's outlet. On May 14, 1804, the expedition left the camp and began the voyage up the Missouri; the strong countercurrent reduced their speed to one mile per hour. The Mandan villages in what is now North Dakota were reached on October 26, after 1,500 miles (2,400 km) of travel from Camp Dubois. The expedition built and wintered at Fort Mandan.

The keelboat was sent back to St. Louis with the returning party on April 6, 1805, while the remainder of the expedition continued overland to the Pacific Ocean. The journey downstream took just 43 days, and the boat reached its goal with diaries and scientific specimens undamaged, in spite of the spring floods. In all likelihood, the boat was then auctioned off to the highest bidder.

== Design ==
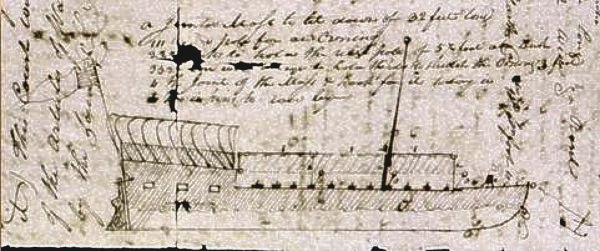
William Clark made two drawing of the keelboat in his diary; here from the side.

Lewis had designed the keelboat; he supervised its construction, and probably made changes and additions during the building period. The boat was basically a galley, a vessel not like any other found west of the Appalachians, although of a standard type used on inland waters in the east. It was 55 feet (17 m) long, with an 8-foot (2.4 m) beam, and with a shallow draft. The mast was 32 feet (9.8 m) high and could be lowered. The boat could carry a headsail and a square rigged sail. A 10-foot (3.0 m) long deck at the bow made a forecastle. A raised aftercastle of the same length contained a cabin. The hold had a capacity of 12 tons. Eleven benches for the oarsmen crossed the deck in front of the aftercastle.

== Construction ==
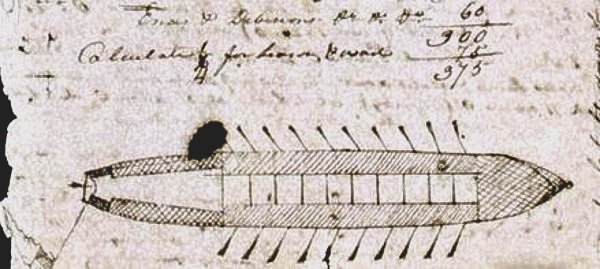
Clark's drawing of the keelboat from above

Lewis was very dissatisfied with how the construction progressed. The boatbuilder was very tardy, drunken, and quarreled with his workers, causing several of them to quit work and leave the yard, further delaying the construction. He promised to bestir himself, but his resolution lasted only for a week. Lewis had to spend most of his time in Pittsburgh at the boat yard, in order to hasten the construction. In his diary, Lewis never named the negligent boatbuilder, and local historians have for a century tried to find out who he was. Much indicates that it was Jacob Myers, an older man with experience as boatbuilder and galley owner.

== Propulsion ==
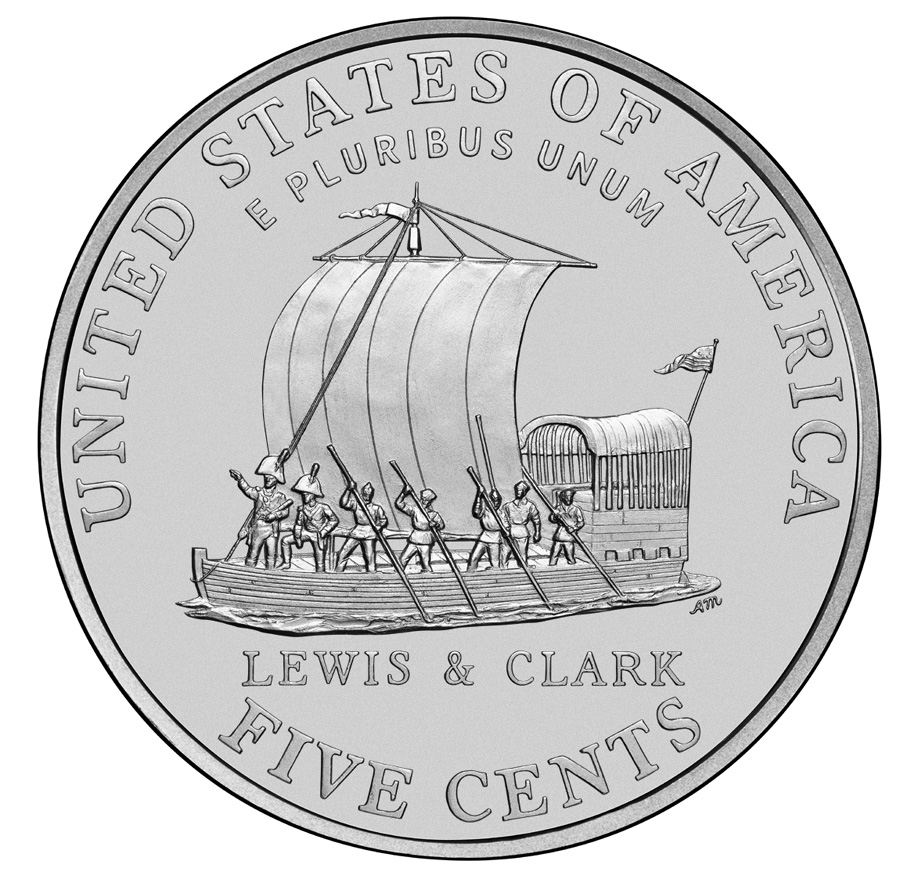
This memorial nickel shows the use of setting poles on Lewis & Clark's Keelboat.

The keelboat could be propelled by oars, sails, poles and towlines. When using the setting poles, the crew put the poles in the bottom of the river and pushed off while walking from the bow to the stern. Towlines were used by men, horses, or oxen pulling the boat.

== Crew ==
According to the standing orders of the expedition, one of the commanding officers should always be in the keelboat as commander. One sergeant was to be at the helm, one amidships, and one at the bow. The helmsman was steersman, supervised the cargo on deck, and was in charge of the compass. The midshipman commanded the armed guard, handled the sails, supervised the oarsmen, and reported river outlets, islands and other remarkable sight amidships. He also distributed the whisky ration and was on duty at night. The bowsman was lookout, reporting all vessels on the river, and all Indian camps. Two privates had permanent tasks aboard, Labiche and Cruzatte, who had been enlisted solely for their experience as boatmen. One of them would always man the larboard bow oar, while the other assisted the bowsman.
