= Lewis and Clark Expedition =

1804–1806 American expedition

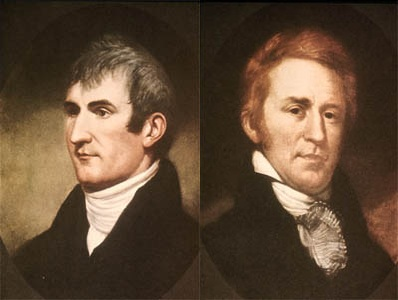
- Portraits of Meriwether Lewis and William Clark

- Route of expedition with modern borders
- Date: May 14, 1804 – September 23, 1806
- Duration: 862 days
- Motive: Explore the 1803 Louisiana Purchase
- Organized by: U.S. president Thomas Jefferson
- Participants: Corps of Discovery: Lewis, Clark, 40 men, and one woman (Sacajawea)
- Deaths: 1 – Charles Floyd, August 1804 near Sioux City, Iowa

The Lewis and Clark Expedition, also known as the Corps of Discovery Expedition, was the United States expedition to cross the newly acquired western portion of the country after the Louisiana Purchase. The Corps of Discovery was a select group of U.S. Army and civilian volunteers under the command of Captain Meriwether Lewis and his close friend Second Lieutenant William Clark. Clark, along with 30 others, set out from Camp Dubois (Camp Wood), Illinois, on May 14, 1804, met Lewis and ten other members of the group in St. Charles, Missouri, then went up the Missouri River. The expedition crossed the Continental Divide of the Americas near the Lemhi Pass, eventually coming to the Columbia River, and the Pacific Ocean in 1805. The return voyage began on March 23, 1806, at Fort Clatsop, Oregon, ending six months later on September 23.

President Thomas Jefferson commissioned the expedition, shortly after the Louisiana Purchase of 1803, to explore and detail as much of the new territory as possible. Furthermore, he wished to find a practical travel route across the western half of the continent—directly avoiding the hot and desolate desert southwest—and to establish an American presence in the new lands before European powers attempted to establish claims of their own. The campaign's secondary objectives were scientific, economical and humanitarian, i.e., to document the West's biodiversity, topography and geography and to establish positive trade relations with (potentially unknown) Native American tribes. The expedition returned to St. Louis to report their findings to President Jefferson via maps, sketches, and various journals.

== Motivations ==
One of Thomas Jefferson's goals was to find "the most direct and practicable water communication across this continent, for the purposes of commerce". He also attached special importance to declaring US sovereignty over the land inhabited by the many different Native American tribes along the Missouri River, and to securing an accurate sense of the resources in the recently completed Louisiana Purchase. The expedition made notable contributions to science, but scientific research was not the main goal of the mission.

== Preparations ==
For years, Thomas Jefferson read accounts about the adventures of various explorers on the western frontier, and, consequently, maintained a long-held interest in further exploring this mostly-unknown region of the continent. In the 1780s, while Minister to France, Jefferson met John Ledyard in Paris, where they discussed a possible trip to the Pacific Northwest. Jefferson had also read Captain James Cook's A Voyage to the Pacific Ocean (London, 1784), an account of Cook's third voyage, and Le Page du Pratz's The History of Louisiana (London, 1763), all of which greatly influenced his decision to send an expedition. Like Captain Cook, he wished to discover a practical route through the Northwest to the Pacific coast. Alexander Mackenzie had already charted a route in his quest for the Pacific, following Canada's Mackenzie River to the Arctic Ocean in 1789. Mackenzie and his party were the first non-indigenous people to cross mainland North America, north of Mexico, reaching the Pacific coast of British Columbia in 1793–twelve years earlier than Lewis and Clark. Mackenzie's accounts in Voyages from Montreal (1801) informed Jefferson of Britain's intent to establish control over the lucrative fur trade of the Columbia River, convincing him of the importance of securing the territory posthaste. In Philadelphia, Israel Whelen, purveyor of public supplies, purchased necessities for the expedition with a list provided by Lewis; among the items found were 193 pounds of portable soup, 130 rolls of pigtail tobacco, 30 gallons of strong spirit of wine, a wide assortment of Native American presents, medical and surgical supplies, mosquito netting, and oilskin bags.

Two years into his presidency, Jefferson asked Congress to fund an expedition through the Louisiana territory to the Pacific Ocean. He did not attempt to make a secret of the Lewis and Clark expedition from Spanish, French, and British officials, but rather claimed different reasons for the venture; he used a secret message to ask for funding, due to poor relations with the opposition Federalist Party in Congress. Congress subsequently appropriated $2,324 for supplies and food, the appropriation of which was left in Lewis's charge.

In 1803, Jefferson commissioned the Corps of Discovery and named Army Captain Meriwether Lewis its leader, who then invited William Clark to co-lead the expedition with him. Lewis demonstrated remarkable skills and potential as a frontiersman, and Jefferson made efforts to prepare him for the long journey ahead as the expedition was gaining approval and funding. Jefferson explained his choice of Lewis:

It was impossible to find a character who to a complete science in botany, natural history, mineralogy & astronomy, joined the firmness of constitution & character, prudence, habits adapted to the woods & a familiarity with the Indian manners and character, requisite for this undertaking. All the latter qualifications Capt. Lewis has.

In 1803, Jefferson sent Lewis to Philadelphia to study medicinal cures under Benjamin Rush, a physician and former leader in the American Revolution. He also arranged for Lewis to be further educated by Andrew Ellicott, an astronomer who instructed him in the use of a sextant, among other navigational instruments. From Benjamin Smith Barton, Lewis learned how to describe and preserve plant and animal specimens; from Robert Patterson, refinements in computing latitude and longitude, and Caspar Wistar covered fossils, and the search for possible living remnants. Lewis, however, was not ignorant of science, having demonstrated a marked capacity to learn, especially with Jefferson as his teacher. At Monticello, Jefferson possessed an enormous library on the subject of North American geography, to which Lewis had full access. He spent time consulting maps and books, as well as conferring with Jefferson.

The keelboat used for the first year of the journey was built near Pittsburgh, Pennsylvania, in the summer of 1803, to Lewis's specifications, and was completed on August 31. The vessel was immediately loaded with equipment and provisions. While in Pittsburgh, Lewis bought a Newfoundland dog, Seaman, to accompany them. Newfoundlands are amicable, large working dogs and good swimmers, lovers of water and commonly found on fishing boats, as they can assist in water rescues. Seaman proved a valuable member of the party, aiding with hunting and protection from bears and other potential predators. He was the only animal to complete the entire trip.

Lewis and his crew set-sail that afternoon, traveling down the Ohio River to meet up with Clark near Louisville, Kentucky, in October 1803, at the Falls of the Ohio. Their goals were to explore the vast territory acquired by the Louisiana Purchase and to establish trade and US sovereignty over the Native Americans along the Missouri River. Jefferson also wanted to establish a US claim of "discovery" to the Pacific Northwest and Oregon Territory by documenting an American presence there before European nations could claim the land. According to some historians, Jefferson understood that he would have a better claim of ownership to the Pacific Northwest if the team gathered scientific data on animals and plants. However, his main objectives were centered on finding an all-water route to the Pacific coast and commerce. His instructions to the expedition stated:

The object of your mission is to explore the Missouri River, & such principle stream of it, as, by its course and communication with the waters of the Pacific ocean, whether the Columbia, Oregon, Colorado or any other river may offer the most direct & practicable water communication across this continent for the purpose of commerce.

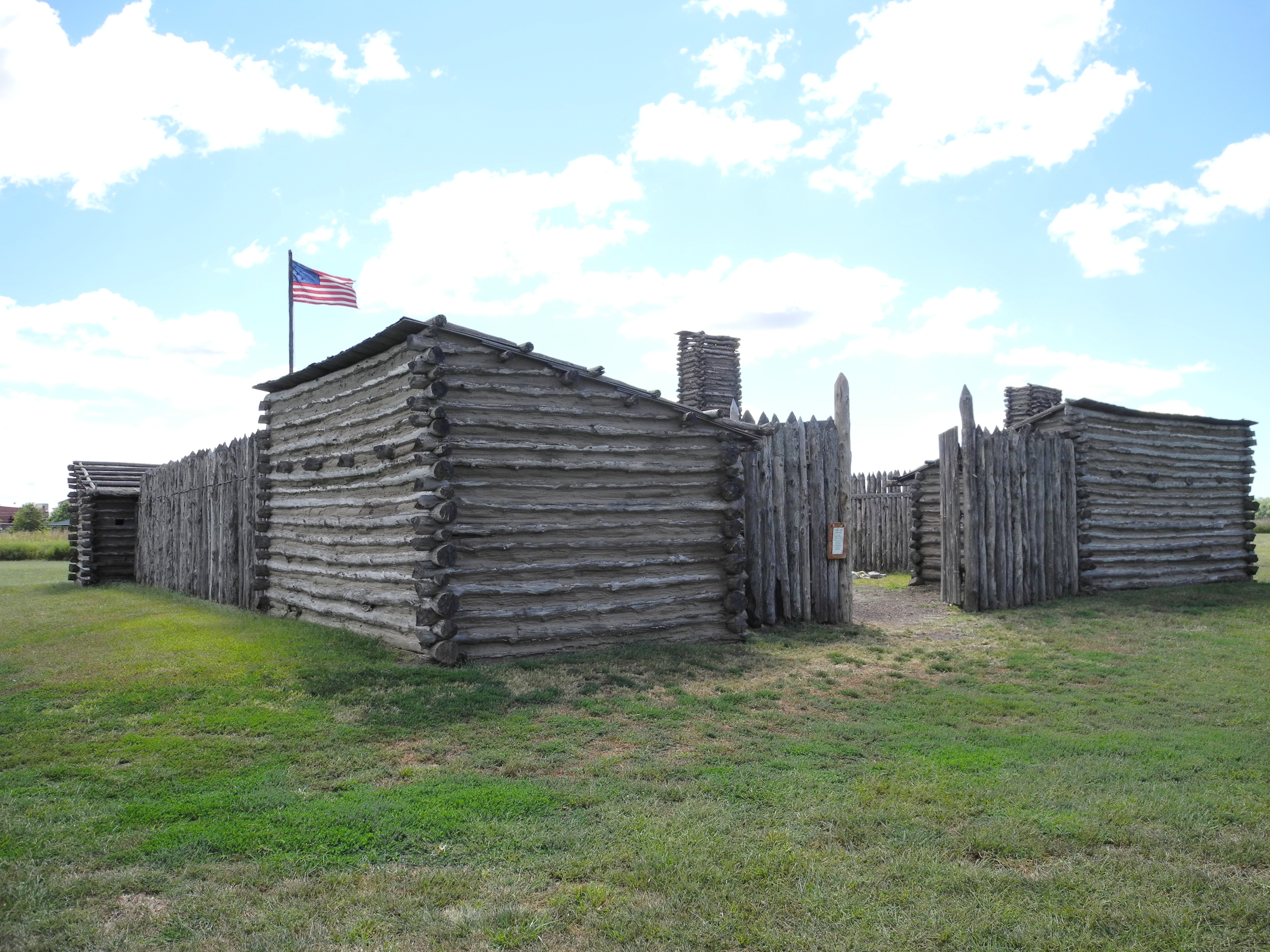
Camp Dubois (Camp Wood) reconstruction, where the Corps of Discovery mustered on the east side of the Mississippi River, through the winter of 1803–1804, to await the transfer of the Louisiana Purchase to the United States

The US mint prepared special silver medals with a portrait of Jefferson and inscribed with a message of friendship and peace, called Indian Peace Medals. The soldiers were to distribute them to the tribes that they met. The expedition also prepared advanced weapons to display their military firepower. Among these was an Austrian-made .46 caliber Girandoni air rifle, a repeating rifle with a 20-round tubular magazine that was powerful enough to kill a deer. The expedition was prepared with flintlock firearms, knives, blacksmithing supplies, and cartography equipment. They also carried flags, gift bundles, medicine, and other items that they would need for their journey. The route of Lewis and Clark's expedition took them up the Missouri River to its headwaters, then on to the Pacific Ocean via the Columbia River, and it may have been influenced by the purported transcontinental journey of Moncacht-Apé by the same route about a century before. Jefferson had a copy of Le Page's book in his library detailing Moncacht-Apé's itinerary, and Lewis carried a copy with him during the expedition. Le Page's description of Moncacht-Apé's route across the continent neglects to mention the need to cross the Rocky Mountains, and it might be the source of Lewis and Clark's mistaken belief that they could easily carry boats from the Missouri's headwaters to the westward-flowing Columbia.

== Journey ==
=== Departure ===
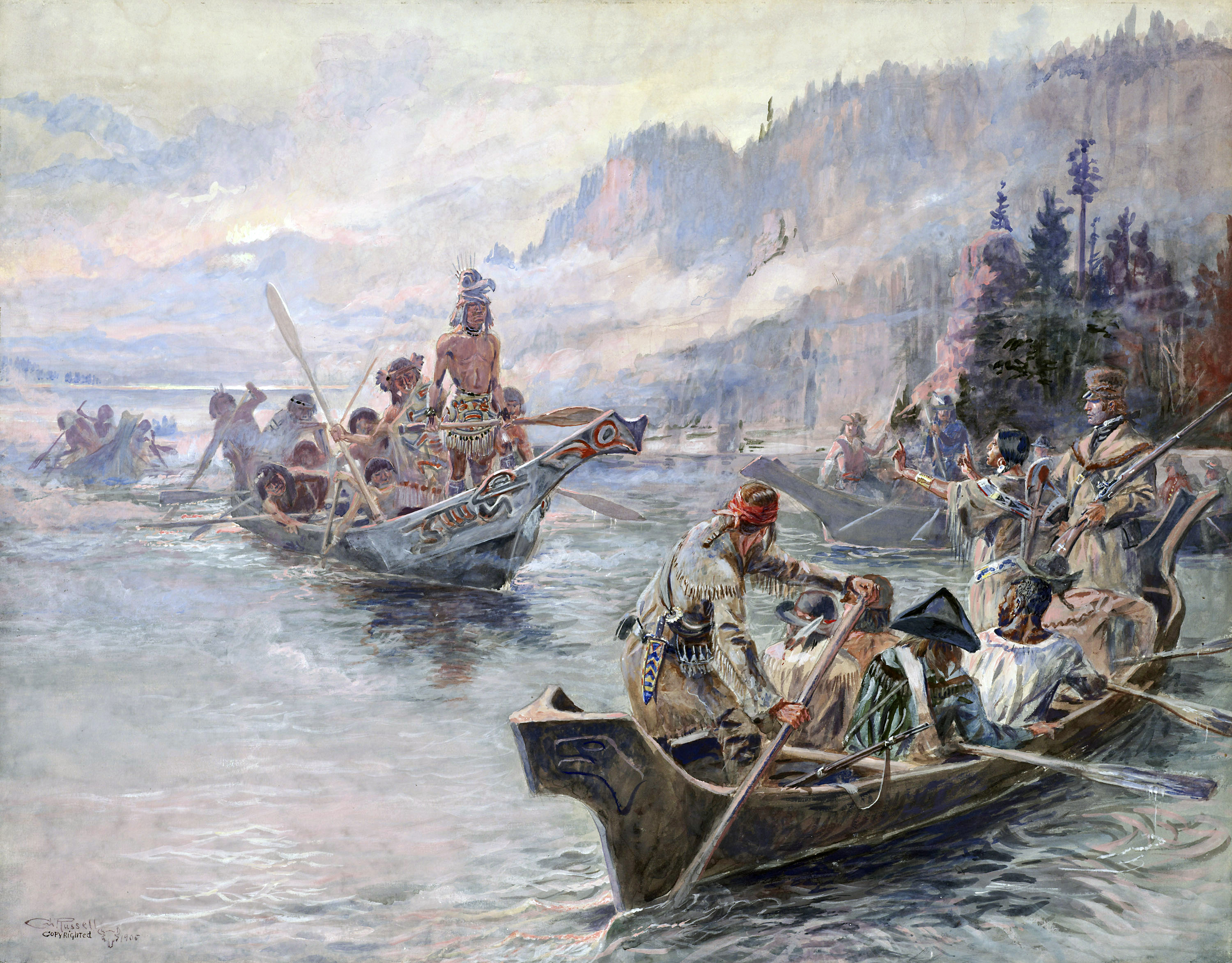
Corps of Discovery meets Chinooks on the Lower Columbia in October 1805 (Lewis and Clark on the Lower Columbia, painted by Charles M. Russell, c. 1905).

The Corps of Discovery departed from Camp Dubois (Camp Wood) at 4 pm on May 14, 1804. Under Clark's command, they traveled up the Missouri River in their keelboat and two pirogues to St. Charles, Missouri, where Lewis joined them six days later. The expedition set out the next afternoon, May 21. While accounts vary, it is believed the Corps had as many as 45 members, including the officers, enlisted military personnel, civilian volunteers, and York, an African-American man enslaved by Clark.

From St. Charles, the expedition followed the Missouri through what is now Kansas City, Missouri, and Omaha, Nebraska. On August 20, 1804, Sergeant Charles Floyd died, apparently from acute appendicitis. He had been among the first to sign up with the Corps of Discovery and was the only member to die during the expedition. He was buried at a bluff by the river, now named after him, in what is now Sioux City, Iowa. His burial site was marked with a cedar post on which was inscribed his name and day of death. 1 mile (2 km) up the river, the expedition camped at a small river which they named Floyd's River. During the final week of August, Lewis and Clark reached the edge of the Great Plains, a place abounding with elk, deer, bison, pronghorn, and beavers.

The Lewis and Clark Expedition established relations with two dozen Native American nations, without whose help the group would have risked starvation during the harsh winters and/or become hopelessly lost in the vast ranges of the Rocky Mountains.

The Americans and the Lakota nation (whom the Americans called Sioux or "Teton-wan Sioux") had problems when they met, and there was a concern the two sides might clash. According to Harry W. Fritz, "All earlier Missouri River travelers had warned of this powerful and aggressive tribe, determined to block free trade on the river. ... The Sioux were also expecting a retaliatory raid from the Omaha tribe, to the south. A recent Sioux raid had killed 75 Omaha men, burned 40 lodges, and taken four dozen prisoners." The expedition held talks with the Lakota near the confluence of the Missouri and Bad rivers in what is now Fort Pierre, South Dakota.

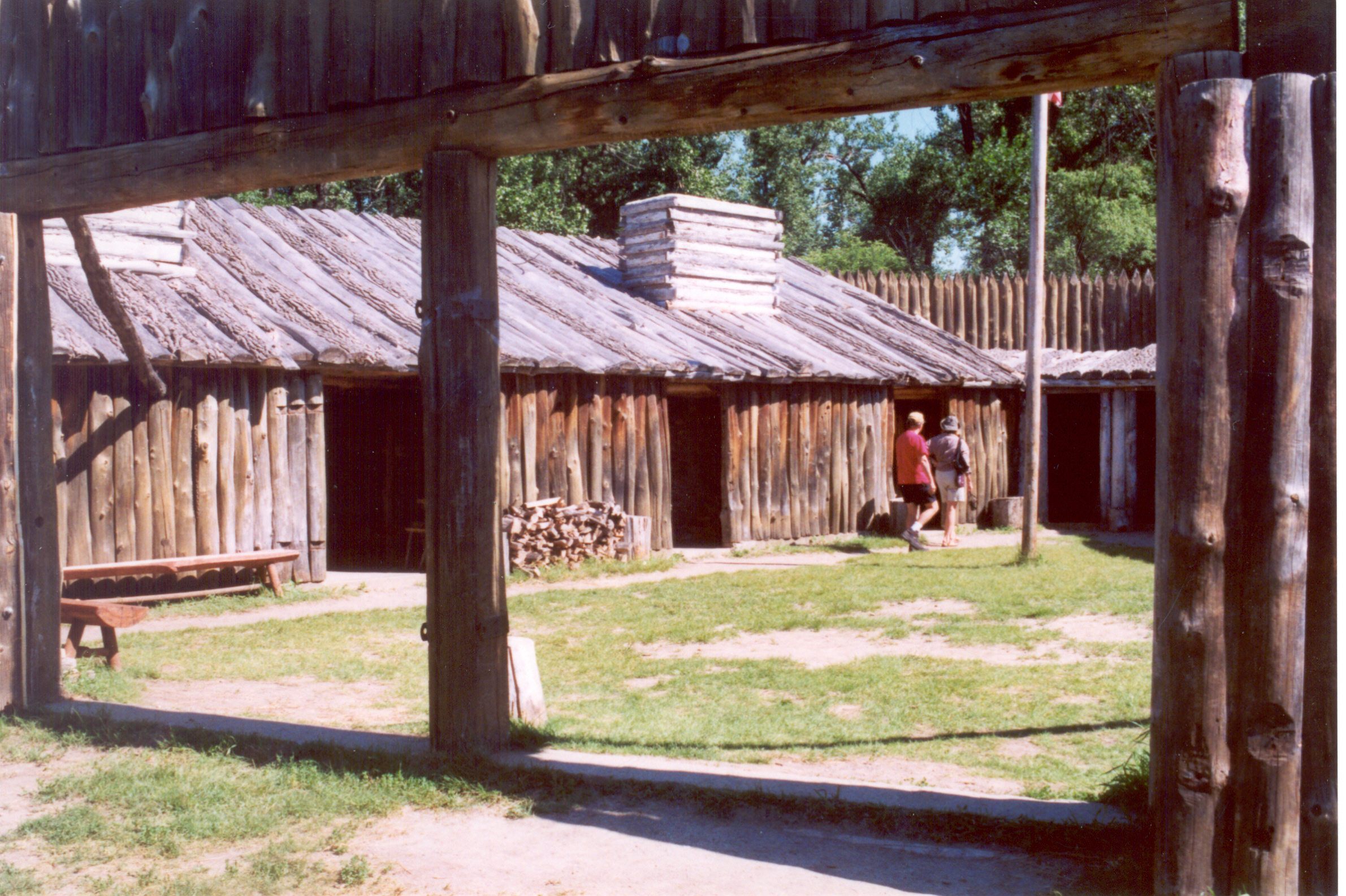
Reconstruction of Fort Mandan, Lewis and Clark Memorial Park, North Dakota

One of their horses disappeared, and they believed the Sioux were responsible. Afterward, the two sides met and there was a disagreement, and the Sioux asked the men to stay or to give more gifts (or tribute) instead, before being allowed to pass through their territory. Clark wrote they were "warlike" and were the "vilest miscreants of the savage race". They came close to blows several times, until the Lakota chief, Black Buffalo, persuaded Lewis to distribute more tobacco to the assembled warriors. Lewis complied and the expedition was allowed to continue upstream to the Arikara villages.

In the winter of 1804–1805, the party built Fort Mandan, near present-day Washburn, North Dakota. Just before departing on April 7, 1805, the expedition sent the keelboat back to St. Louis with a sample of specimens, some never-before-seen east of the Mississippi. One chief asked Lewis and Clark to provide a boat for passage through their national territory. The Americans quickly continued westward (upriver), and camped for the winter in the Mandan nation's territory.

After the expedition had set up camp, nearby tribal members came to visit in fair numbers, with some staying overnight. For several days, Lewis and Clark met in council with Mandan chiefs. Here they met a French-Canadian fur trapper named Toussaint Charbonneau, and his young Shoshone wife, Sacagawea. Charbonneau, at this time, began to serve as the expedition's translator. Peace was established between the expedition and the Mandan chiefs with the sharing of a Mandan ceremonial pipe. By April 25, Captain Lewis wrote his progress report of the expedition's activities and observations of the Native American nations they had encountered to-date in A Statistical view of the Indian nations inhabiting the Territory of Louisiana, which outlined the names of various tribes, their locations, trading practices and water routes used, among other points. President Jefferson would later present this report to Congress.

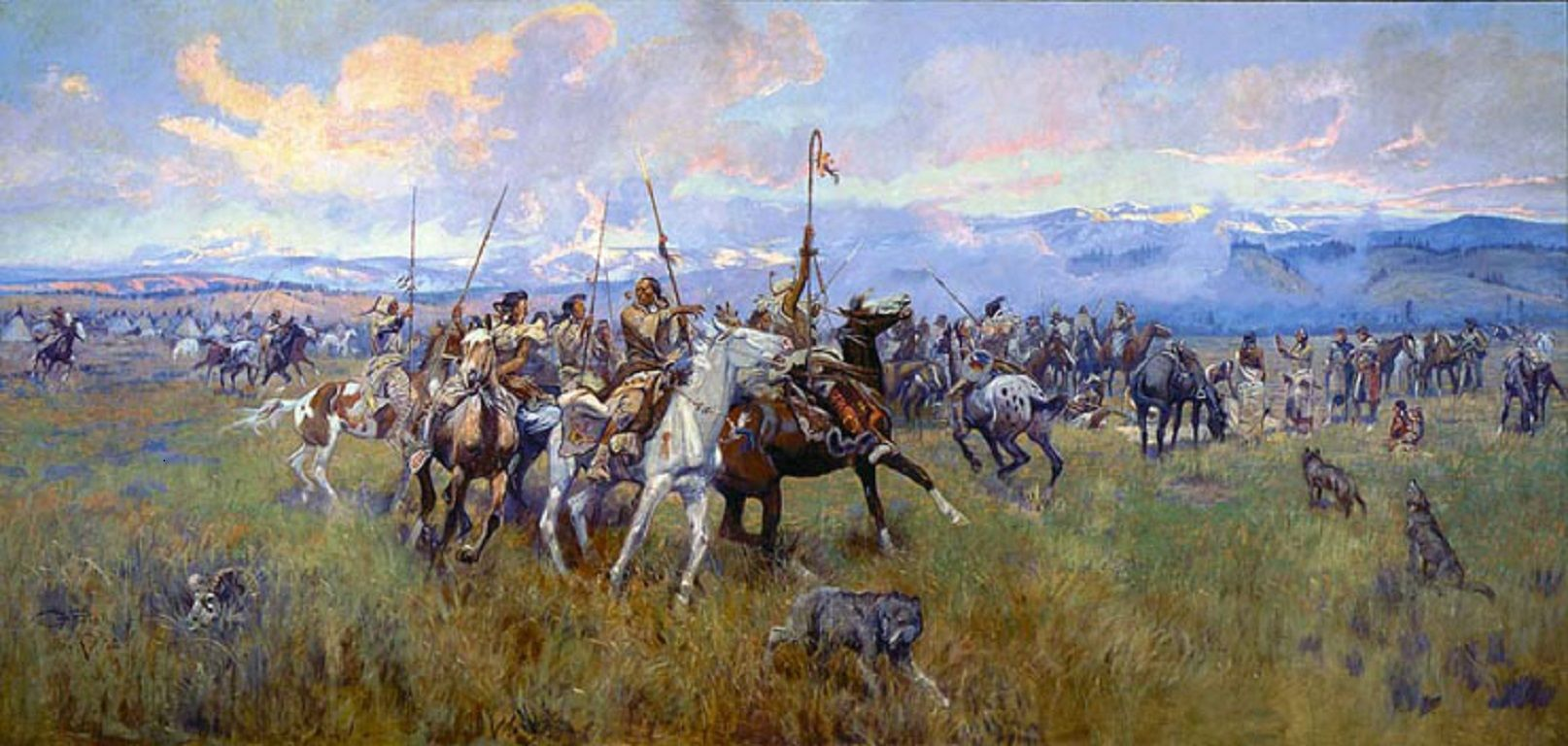
Lewis and Clark meeting the Bitterroot Salish at Ross Hole, September 4, 1805

They followed the Missouri to its headwaters, and over the Continental Divide at Lemhi Pass, then north to Traveler's Rest, and crossed the Bitteroots at Lolo Pass. They descended on foot, then proceeded in canoes down the Clearwater, Snake, and Columbia rivers, past Celilo Falls and present-day Portland, at the confluence of the Willamette and Columbia rivers. Lewis and Clark used William Robert Broughton's 1792 notes and maps to orient themselves once they reached the lower Columbia River. The sighting of Mount Hood and other stratovolcanos confirmed that the expedition had almost reached the Pacific Ocean.

=== Pacific Ocean ===
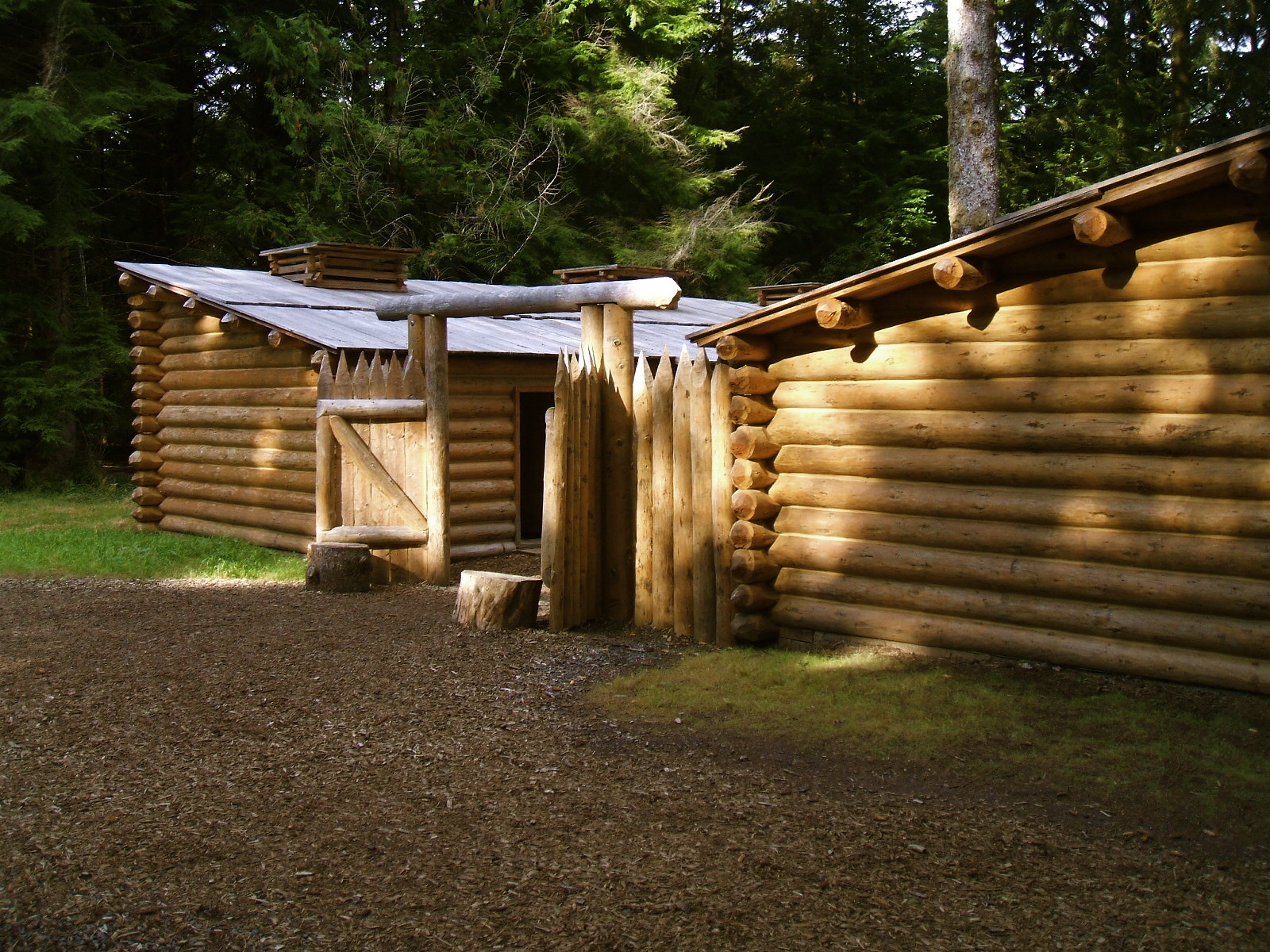
Fort Clatsop reconstruction on the Columbia River near the Pacific Ocean

The expedition sighted the Pacific Ocean for the first time on November 7, 1805, arriving two weeks later. The expedition faced the beginning of its second bitter winter camped on the north side of the Columbia River, in a storm-wracked area Clark called Dismal Nitch. Lack of food was a major factor. The elk, the party's main source of food, had retreated from their usual haunts into the mountains, and the party was now too poor to purchase enough food from neighboring tribes. On November 24, 1805, the majority of the party voted to move their camp to the south side of the Columbia River near modern Astoria, Oregon. Both Sacagawea and the enslaved York participated in the vote.

On the south side of the Columbia River, 2 miles (3 km) upstream on the west side of the Netul River (now Lewis and Clark River), they constructed Fort Clatsop. They did this not just for shelter and protection, but also to officially establish the American presence there, with the American flag flying over the fort. During the winter at Fort Clatsop, Lewis committed himself to writing. He filled many pages of his journals with valuable knowledge, mostly about botany, because of the abundant growth and forests that covered that part of the continent. The health of the men also became a problem, with many suffering from colds and influenza.

Knowing that maritime fur traders sometimes visited the lower Columbia River, Lewis and Clark repeatedly asked the local Chinooks about trading ships. They learned that Captain Samuel Hill had been there in early 1805. Miscommunication caused Clark to record the name as "Haley". Captain Hill returned in November 1805, and anchored about 10 miles (16 km) from Fort Clatsop. The Chinook told Hill about Lewis and Clark, but no direct contact was made.

A Russian maritime expedition under statesman Nikolai Rezanov arrived at the mouth of the Columbia River while Lewis and Clark were still there. Neither Rezanov nor Lewis and Clark knew about each other. Rezanov had come from Novo-Arkhangelsk (today Sitka, Alaska), intending to establish a Russian agricultural colony to help with the perennial food shortages in Russian America, and made plans for a relocation of the capital of Russian America from Sitka to the lower Columbia River. But his ship, Juno, was unable to cross the Columbia Bar. So Rezanov went to California instead, setting in motion a process that eventually led to the founding of Fort Ross, California.

=== Return trip ===
Lewis was determined to remain at the fort until April 1, but was still anxious to move out at the earliest opportunity. By March 22, the stormy weather had subsided and the following morning, on March 23, 1806, the journey home began. The Corps began their journey homeward using canoes to ascend the Columbia River, and later by trekking over land.

Before leaving, Clark gave the Chinook a letter to give to the next ship captain to visit, which was the same Captain Hill who had been nearby during the winter. Hill took the letter to Canton and had it forwarded to Thomas Jefferson, who thus received it before Lewis and Clark returned.

They made their way to Camp Chopunnish (Note: 'Chopunnish' was the Captain's term for the Nez Perce Pass) in Idaho, along the north bank of the Clearwater River, where the members of the expedition collected 65 horses in preparation to cross the Bitterroot Mountains, lying between modern-day Idaho and western Montana. However, the range was still covered in snow, which prevented the expedition from making the crossing. On April 11, while the Corps was waiting for the snow to diminish, Lewis's dog, Seaman, was stolen by Native Americans, but was retrieved soon after. Worried that other such acts might follow, Lewis warned the chief that any other wrongdoing or mischievous acts would result in instant death.

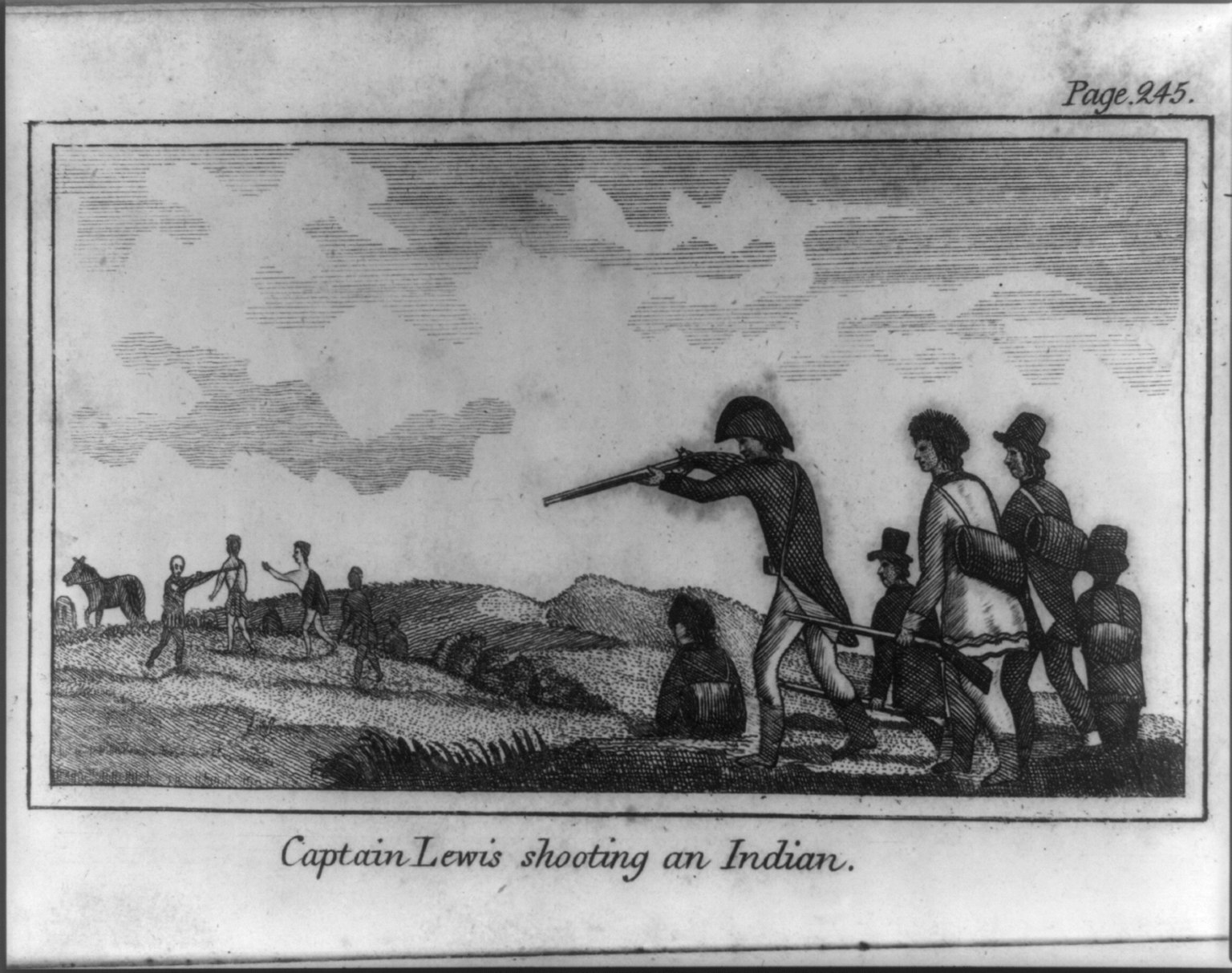
Depiction of Meriwether Lewis, shooting a Piegan Blackfoot Indian near Two Medicine River. On July 26, 1806, on the return trip of the expedition, Lewis and his men encountered Piegans attempting to steal their weapons and horses while they slept. Lewis shot one and Reubin Field stabbed another. The party then fled the area.

On July 3, before crossing the Continental Divide, the Corps split into two teams so Lewis could explore the Marias River. Lewis's group of four met some men from the Blackfeet nation. During the night, the Blackfeet tried to steal their weapons. In the struggle, the soldiers killed two Blackfeet men. Lewis, George Drouillard, and the Field brothers fled over 100 miles (160 kilometres) in a day before they camped again.

Meanwhile, Clark had entered the Crow tribe's territory. In the night, half of Clark's horses disappeared, but not a single Crow had been seen. Lewis and Clark stayed separated until they reached the confluence of the Yellowstone and Missouri Rivers on August 11. As the groups reunited, one of Clark's hunters, Pierre Cruzatte, mistook Lewis for an elk and fired, injuring Lewis in the thigh. Once together, the Corps was able to return home quickly via the Missouri River. They reached St. Louis on September 23, 1806.

=== Spanish interference ===
In March 1804, before the expedition began in May, the Spanish in New Mexico learned from General James Wilkinson (Note: After Wilkinson died in 1825, it was discovered that he was a spy for the Spanish crown.) that the Americans were encroaching on territory claimed by Spain. After the Lewis and Clark expedition set off in May, the Spanish sent four armed expeditions of 52 soldiers, mercenaries, and Native Americans on August 1, 1804, from Santa Fe, New Mexico, northward under Pedro Vial and José Jarvet to intercept Lewis and Clark and imprison the entire expedition. They reached the Pawnee settlement on the Platte River in central Nebraska and learned that the expedition had been there many days before. Vial's attempt to intercept them was unsuccessful.

== Geography and science ==
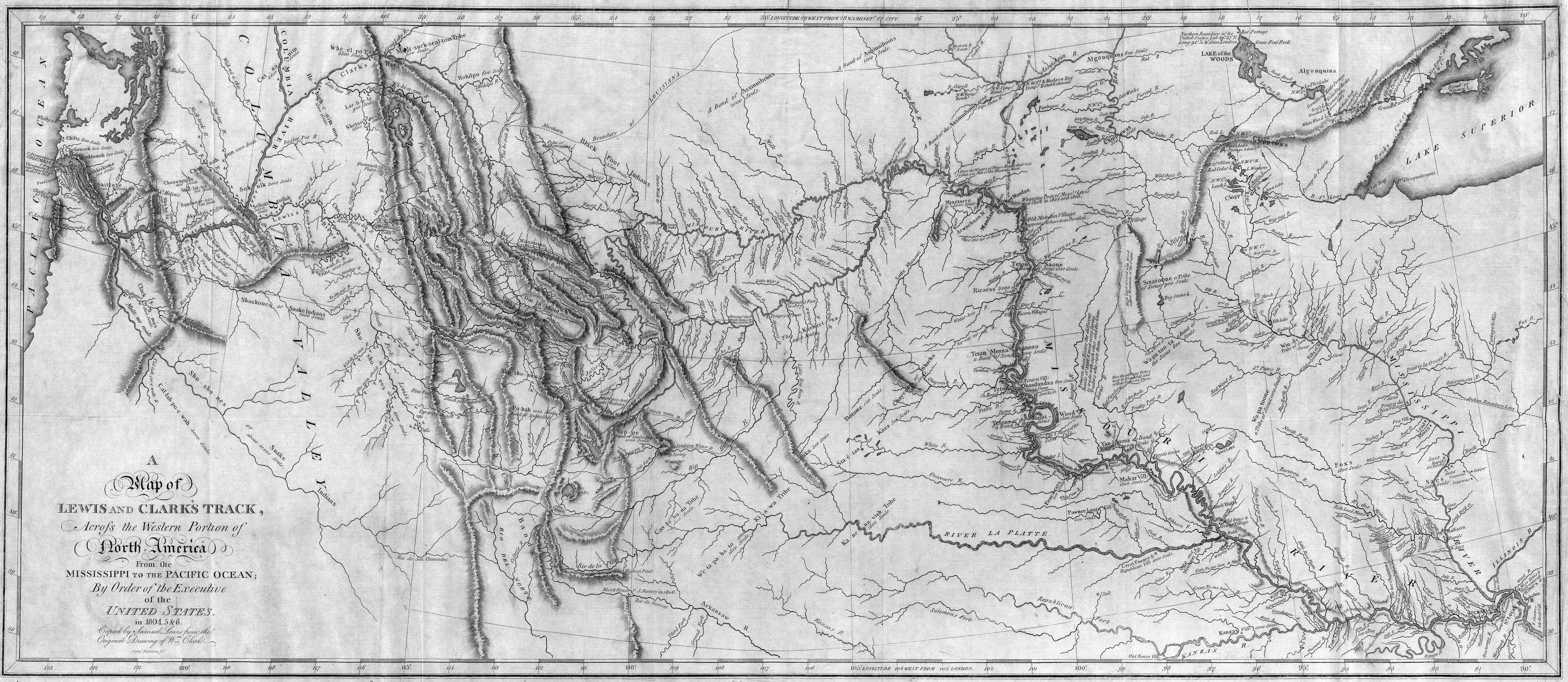
Map of Lewis and Clark's expedition: It changed mapping of northwest America by providing the first accurate depiction of the relationship of the sources of the Columbia and Missouri rivers, and the Rocky Mountains around 1814

The Lewis and Clark Expedition gained an understanding of the geography of the Pacific Northwest and produced the first accurate maps of the area. During the journey, Lewis and Clark drew about 140 maps. Stephen Ambrose says the expedition "filled in the main outlines" of the area.

The expedition documented natural resources and plants that had been previously unknown to European Americans, though not to the indigenous peoples. Lewis and Clark were the first Americans to cross the Continental Divide, and the first Americans to see Yellowstone, enter into Montana, and produce an official description of these different regions. Their visit to the Pacific Northwest, maps, and proclamations of sovereignty with medals and flags were legal steps needed to claim title to each indigenous nation's lands under the discovery doctrine.

The expedition was sponsored by the American Philosophical Society (APS). Lewis and Clark received some instruction in astronomy, botany, climatology, ethnology, geography, meteorology, mineralogy, ornithology, and zoology. During the expedition, they made contact with over 70 Native American tribes and described more than 200 new plant and animal species.

Thomas Jefferson had the expedition declare "sovereignty" and demonstrate their military strength to ensure native tribes would be subordinate to the U.S., as European colonizers did elsewhere. After the expedition, the maps that were produced allowed the further discovery and settlement of this vast territory in the years that followed.

In 1807, Patrick Gass, a private in the U.S. Army, published an account of the journey. He was promoted to sergeant during the course of the expedition. Paul Allen edited a two-volume history of the Lewis and Clark expedition that was published in 1814, in Philadelphia, but without mention of the actual author, banker Nicholas Biddle. Even then, the complete report was not made public until more recently. The earliest authorized edition of the Lewis and Clark journals resides in the Maureen and Mike Mansfield Library at the University of Montana.

== Encounters with Native Americans ==
One of the expedition's primary objectives as directed by President Jefferson was to be a surveillance mission that would report back the whereabouts, military strength, lives, activities, and cultures of the various Native American tribes that inhabited the territory newly acquired by the United States as part of the Louisiana Purchase and the northwest in general. The expedition was to make native people understand that their lands now belonged to the United States and that "their great father" in Washington was now their sovereign. The expedition encountered many different native nations and tribes along the way, many of whom offered their assistance, providing the expedition with their knowledge of the wilderness and with the acquisition of food. The expedition had blank leather-bound journals and ink for the purpose of recording such encounters, as well as for scientific and geological information. They were also provided with various gifts of medals, ribbons, needles, mirrors, and other articles which were intended to ease any tensions when negotiating their passage with the various Native American chiefs whom they would encounter along their way.

Many of the tribes had friendly experiences with British and French fur traders in various isolated encounters along the Missouri and Columbia rivers, and for the most part the expedition did not encounter hostilities. However, there was a tense confrontation on September 25, 1804, with the Teton-Sioux tribe (also known as the Lakota people, one of the three tribes that comprise the Great Sioux Nation), under chiefs that included Black Buffalo and the Partisan. These chiefs confronted the expedition and demanded tribute from the expedition for their passage over the river. The seven native tribes that comprised the Lakota people controlled a vast inland empire and expected gifts from strangers who wished to navigate their rivers or to pass through their lands. According to Harry W. Fritz, "All earlier Missouri River travelers had warned of this powerful and aggressive tribe, determined to block free trade on the river. ... The Sioux were also expecting a retaliatory raid from the Omaha tribe, to the south. A recent Sioux raid had killed 75 Omaha men, burned 40 lodges, and taken four dozen prisoners."

Captain Lewis made his first mistake by offering the Sioux chief gifts first, which insulted and angered the Partisan chief. Communication was difficult, since the expedition's only Sioux language interpreter was Pierre Dorion who had stayed behind with the other party and was also involved with diplomatic affairs with another tribe. Consequently, both chiefs were offered a few gifts, but neither was satisfied and both wanted further gifts for their warriors and tribe. At that point, some of the warriors from the Partisan tribe took hold of their boat and one of the oars. Lewis took a firm stand, ordering a display of force and presenting arms; Captain Clark brandished his sword and threatened violent reprisal. Just before the situation erupted into a violent confrontation, Black Buffalo ordered his warriors to back off.

The captains were able to negotiate their passage without further incident with the aid of better gifts and a bottle of whiskey. During the next two days, the expedition made camp not far from Black Buffalo's tribe. Similar incidents occurred when they tried to leave, but trouble was averted with gifts of tobacco.

=== Observations ===
As the expedition encountered the various Native American tribes during the course of their journey, they observed and recorded information regarding their lifestyles, customs and the social codes they lived by, as directed by President Jefferson. By European standards, the Native American way of life seemed harsh and unforgiving as witnessed by members of the expedition. After many encounters and camping in close proximity to the Native American nations for extended periods of time during the winter months, they soon learned first hand of their customs and social orders.

One of the primary customs that distinguished Native American cultures from those of the West was that it was customary for the men to take on two or more wives if they were able to provide for them and often took on a wife or wives who were members of the immediate family circle, e.g. men in the Minnetaree (Note: aka the Hidatsa) and Mandan tribes would often take on a sister for a wife. Chastity among women was not held in high regard. Infant daughters were often sold by the father to men who were grown, usually for horses or mules. Women in Sioux nations were often bartered away for horses or other supplies; yet this was not practiced among the Shoshone nation, who held their women in higher regard.

They witnessed that many of the Native American nations were constantly at war with other tribes, especially the Sioux, who, while remaining generally friendly to the white fur traders, had proudly boasted of and justified the almost complete destruction of the once great Cahokia nation, along with the Missouris, Illinois, Kaskaskia, and Piorias tribes that lived about the countryside adjacent to the upper Mississippi and Missouri rivers.

=== Sacagawea ===
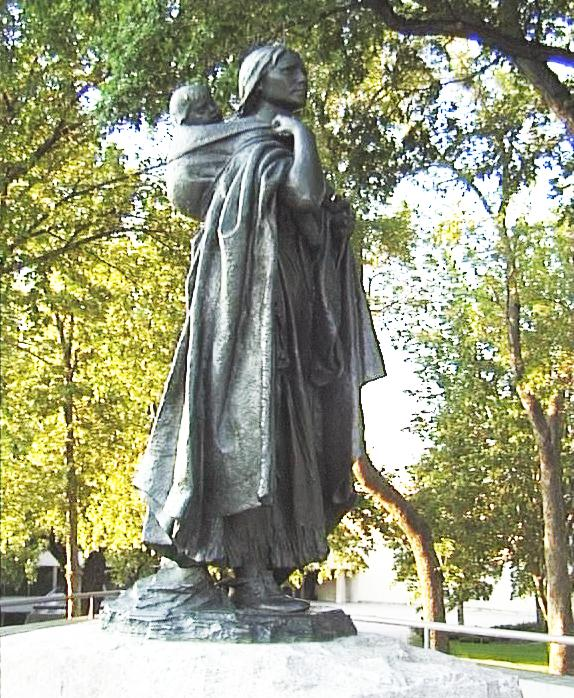
Statue of Sacagawea, a Shoshone woman who accompanied the Lewis and Clark Expedition

Sacagawea, sometimes spelled Sakajawea or Sakagawea (c. 1788 – December 20, 1812), was a Shoshone Native American woman who arrived with her husband and owner Toussaint Charbonneau on the expedition to the Pacific Ocean.

On February 11, 1805, a few weeks after her first contact with the expedition, Sacagawea went into labor which was slow and painful, so the Frenchman Charbonneau suggested she be given a potion of rattlesnake's rattle to aid in her delivery. Lewis happened to have some snake's rattle with him. A short time after administering the potion, she delivered a healthy boy who was given the name Jean Baptiste Charbonneau.

When the expedition reached the Marias River, on June 16, 1805, Sacagawea became dangerously ill. She was able to find relief by drinking mineral water from the sulphur spring that fed into the river.

Though she has been discussed in literature frequently, much of the information is exaggeration or fiction. Scholars say she did notice some geographical features, but "Sacagawea ... was not the guide for the Expedition, she was important to them as an interpreter and in other ways." The sight of a woman and her infant son would have been reassuring to some indigenous nations, and she played an important role in diplomatic relations by talking to chiefs, easing tensions, and giving the impression of a peaceful mission.

In his writings, Meriwether Lewis presented a somewhat negative view of her, though Clark had a higher regard for her, and provided some support for her children in subsequent years. In the journals, they used the terms "squar" (squaw) and "savages" to refer to Sacagawea and other indigenous peoples.

== York ==
An enslaved Black man known only as York took part in the expedition as personal servant to William Clark, his enslaver. York did much to help the expedition succeed. He proved popular with the Native Americans, who had never seen a Black man. He also helped with hunting and the heavy labor of pulling boats upstream. Despite his contributions to the Corps of Discovery, Clark refused to release York from bondage upon returning east. While all the other explorers enjoyed rewards of double pay and hundreds of acres of land, York received nothing. After the end of the expedition, Clark allowed York only a brief visit to Kentucky to see his wife before forcing him to return to Missouri. It is unlikely that he ever saw his wife again: "ten years after the expedition's end, York was still enslaved, working as a wagoner for the Clark family". The last years of York's life are disputed. In the 1830s, a Black man who said he had first come with Lewis and Clark was living as a chief with Native Americans they met on the expedition, in modern Wyoming.

== Accomplishments ==
The Corps met their objective of reaching the Pacific Ocean, mapping and establishing their presence for a legal claim to the land. They established diplomatic relations and trade with at least two dozen indigenous nations. They did not find a continuous waterway to the Pacific but located a Native American trail that led from the upper end of the Missouri River to the Columbia River which ran to the Pacific Ocean. They gained information about the natural habitat, flora and fauna, bringing back various plant, seed and mineral specimens. They mapped the topography of the land, designating the location of mountain ranges, rivers and the many Native American tribes during the course of their journey. They also learned and recorded much about the language and customs of the Native American tribes they encountered, and brought back many of their artifacts, including bows, clothing and ceremonial robes.

== Aftermath ==
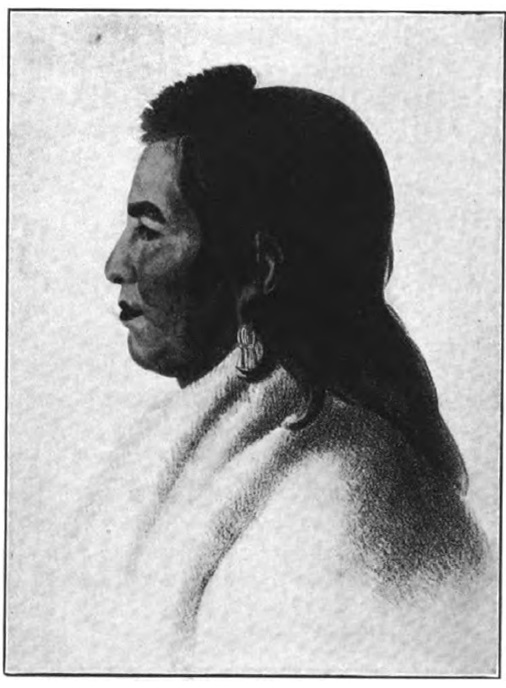
Painting of Mandan Chief Big White, who accompanied Lewis and Clark on their return from the expedition

Two months passed after the expedition's end before Thomas Jefferson made his first public statement to Congress, giving a one-sentence summary about the success of the expedition before offering justification for the expenses involved. Over the course of their journey, the Corps of Discovery acquired a knowledge of numerous tribes of Native Americans previously unknown to Europeans or Americans; they informed themselves of the trade which may be carried on with them, the best channels and positions for it, and they were able to describe the geography of the route they took with accuracy. Upon their return, the botanical and zoological discoveries drew the intense interest of the American Philosophical Society who requested specimens, various artifacts traded with the Native Americans, and reports on plants and wildlife along with various seeds obtained. Jefferson used seeds from "Missouri hominy corn" along with a number of other unidentified seeds to plant at Monticello which he cultivated and studied. He later reported on the "Indian corn" he had grown as being an "excellent" food source. The expedition helped establish the U.S. presence in the newly acquired territory and beyond and opened the door to further exploration, trade and scientific discoveries.

Lewis and Clark returned from their expedition, bringing with them the Mandan chief Shehaka from the Upper Missouri to visit the "Great Father" in Washington. After Chief Shehaka's visit, it required multiple attempts and multiple military expeditions to safely return Shehaka to his nation.

Upon returning from their expedition, Lewis and Clark struggled to prepare their manuscripts for publication. Clark managed to persuade Nicholas Biddle to edit the journals, which were then published in 1814 as the History of the Expedition Under the Commands of Captains Lewis and Clark. However, Biddle's narrative account omitted much of the material related to their discoveries in flora and fauna. Since Biddle's account was the only printed account of the original journals for the next 90 years, many of Lewis and Clark's discoveries were later unknowingly rediscovered and given new names. It wasn't until 1904–1905, through the publication of Original Journals of the Lewis and Clark Expedition by Reuben Gold Thwaites, that the general public became aware of the full extent of the scientific discoveries made by the expedition.

During the 19th century, references to Lewis and Clark "scarcely appeared" in history books, even during the United States Centennial in 1876, and the expedition was largely forgotten. Lewis and Clark began to gain attention around the beginning of the 20th century. Both the 1904 Louisiana Purchase Exposition in St. Louis and the 1905 Lewis and Clark Centennial Exposition in Portland, Oregon, showcased them as American pioneers. The extent of the expedition's discoveries remained poorly recognized until the middle of the 20th Century, with Lewis and Clark's voyage known mostly as a celebration of US conquest and personal adventures, but since then the expedition has been more thoroughly researched.

As of 1984, no US exploration party was more famous, and no American expedition leaders are more recognizable by name.

In 2004, a complete and reliable set of the expedition's journals was compiled by Gary E. Moulton. Circa 2004, the bicentennial of the expedition further elevated popular interest in Lewis and Clark.

== Legacy and honors ==
In the 1970s, the federal government memorialized the winter assembly encampment, Camp Dubois, as the start of the Lewis and Clark voyage of discovery and in 2019 it recognized Pittsburgh, Pennsylvania, as the start of the expedition.

Since the expedition, Lewis and Clark have been commemorated and honored over the years on various coins, currency, and commemorative postage stamps, as well as in a number of other capacities. In 2004, the American elm cultivar Ulmus americana 'Lewis & Clark' (selling name Prairie Expedition) was released by North Dakota State University Research Foundation in commemoration of the expedition's bicentenary; the tree has a resistance to Dutch elm disease.

Lewis and Clark County, in Montana, as well as the Lewis and Clark River in Oregon are both named after the expedition's leaders.

The Lewis and Clark Public School District in North Dakota is named after the pair.

North Dakota state Highways 1804 and 1806 are named to reflect the years of Lewis and Clark's travels through the area, and together constitute the portion of the Lewis and Clark Trail that runs through the state.

Campsite Lewis and Clark in Camp Sandy Beach at Yawgoog Scout Reservation in Rockville, Rhode Island, also honors both explorers.

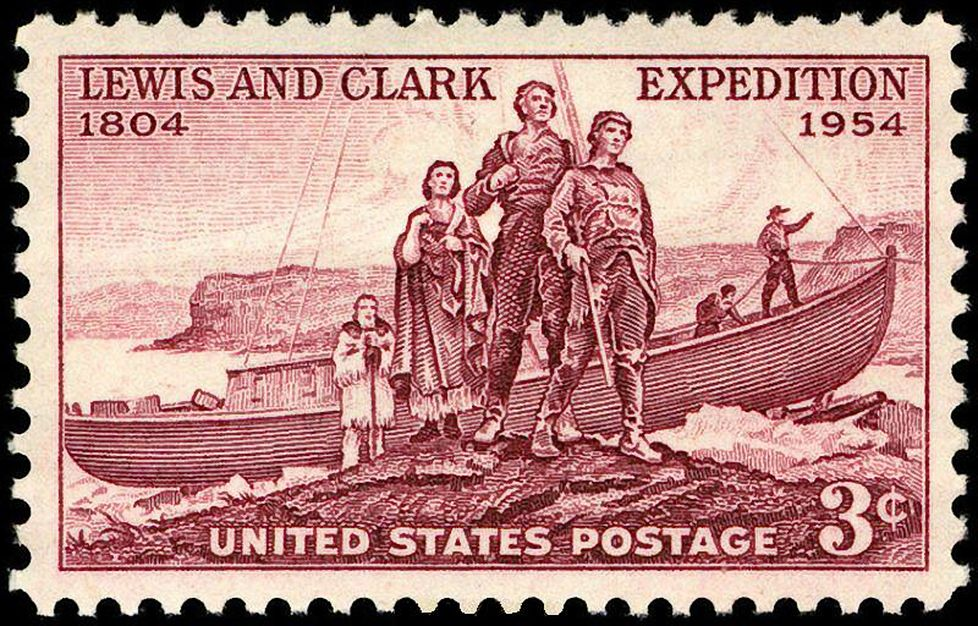
Lewis and Clark Expedition
150th anniversary issue, 1954

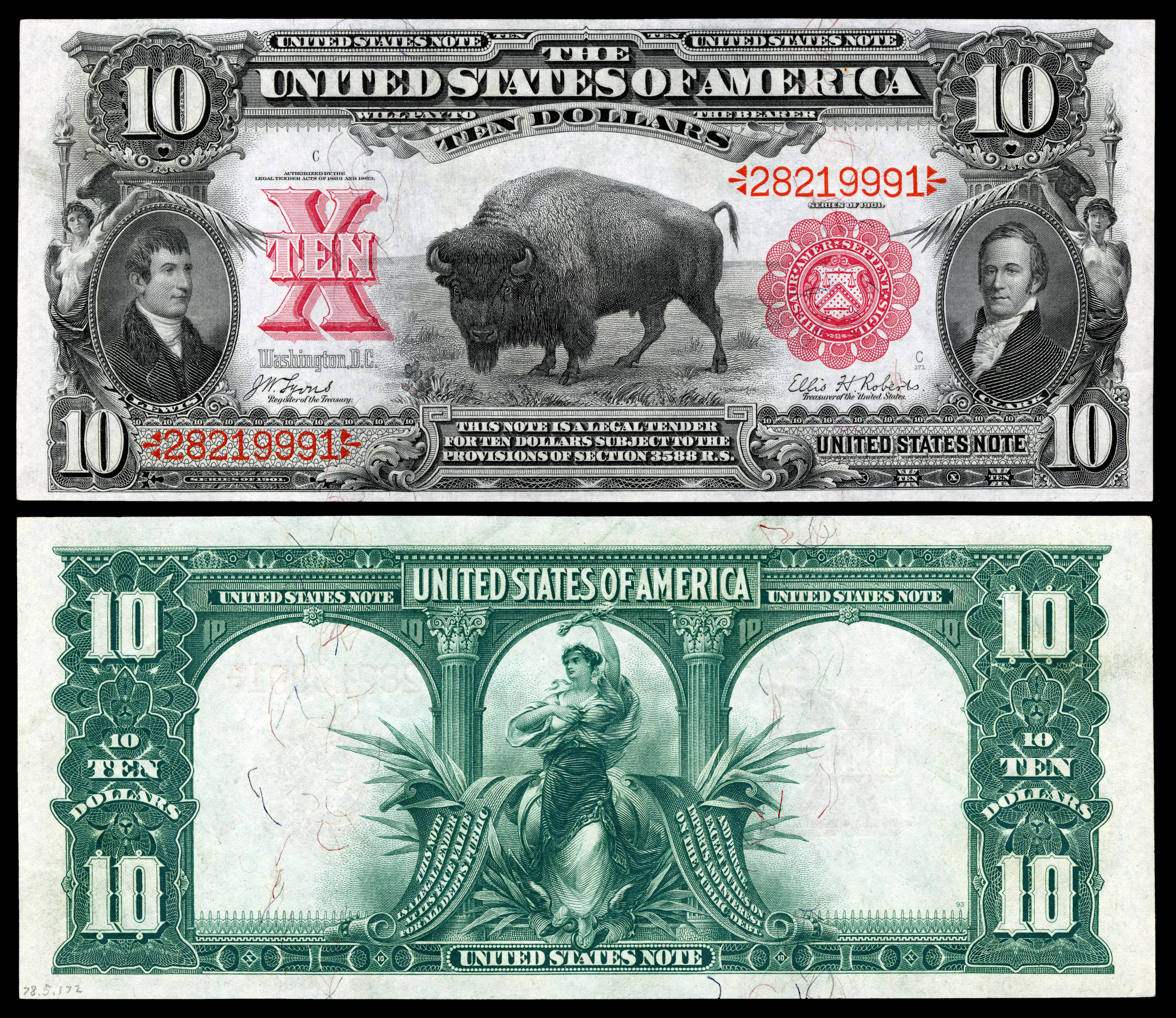
Lewis and Clark were honored (along with the American bison) on the Series of 1901 $10 Legal Tender

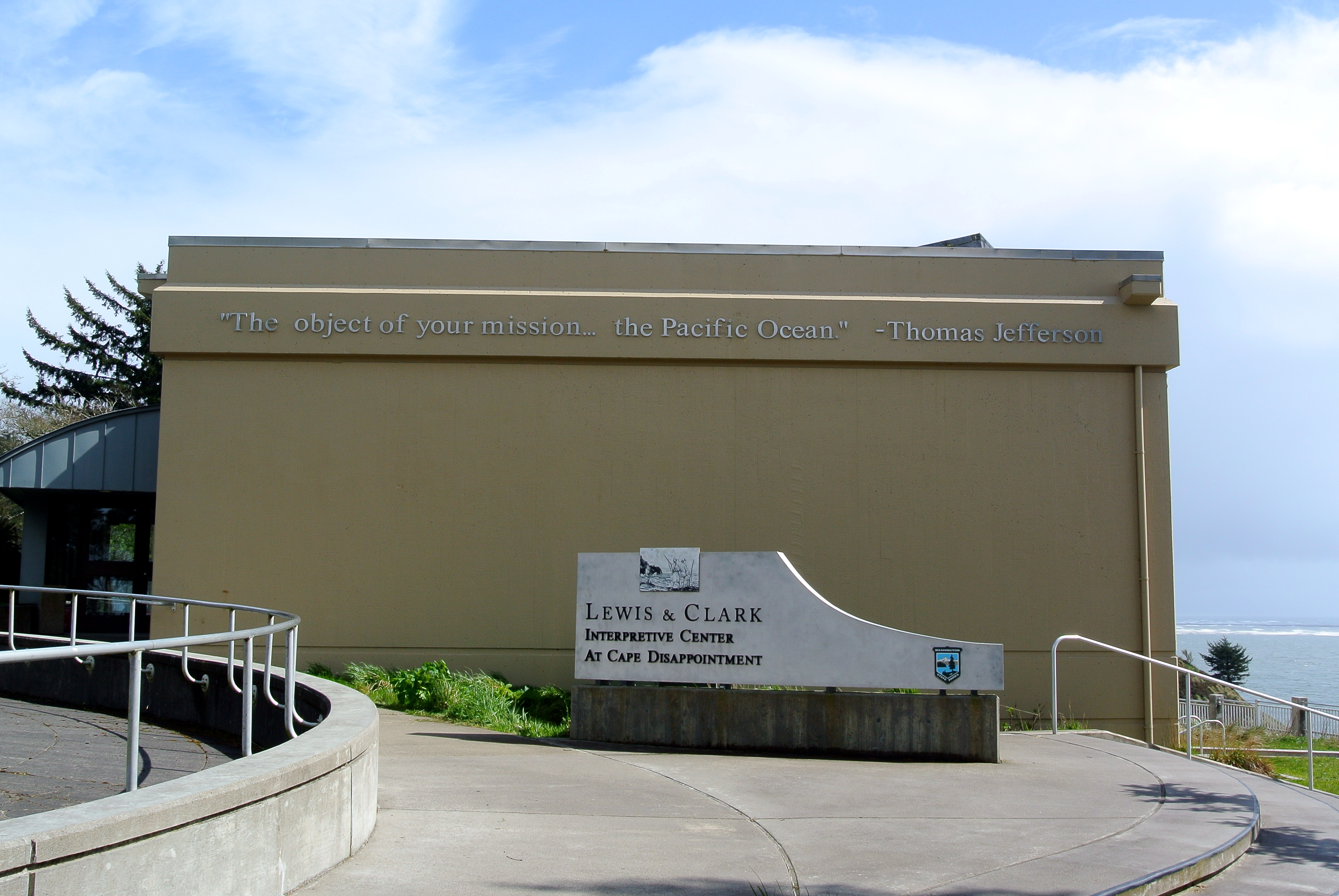
Lewis and Clark Interpretive Center in Cape Disappointment State Park

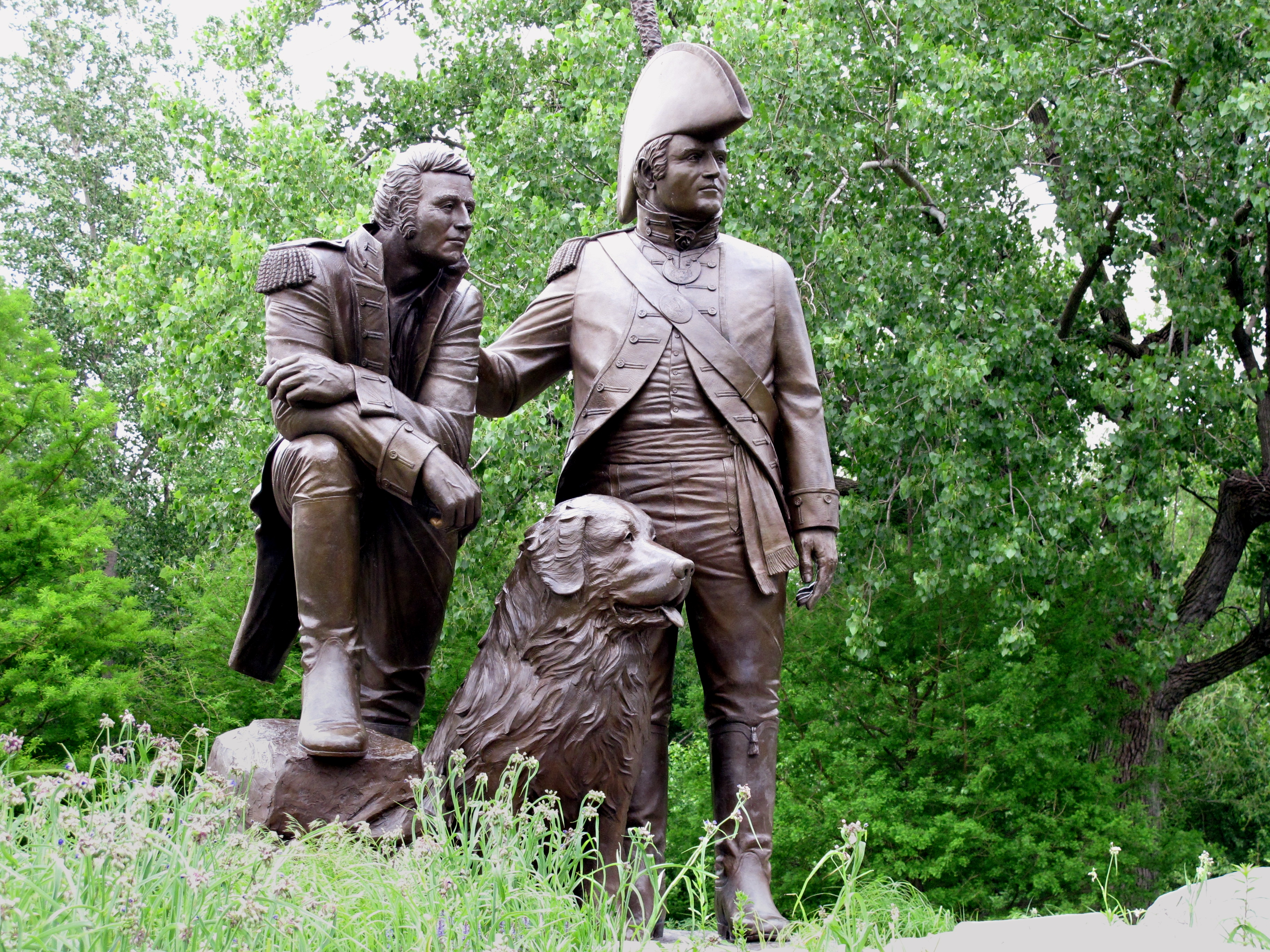
Lewis and Clark statue (with Seaman) in St. Charles, Missouri

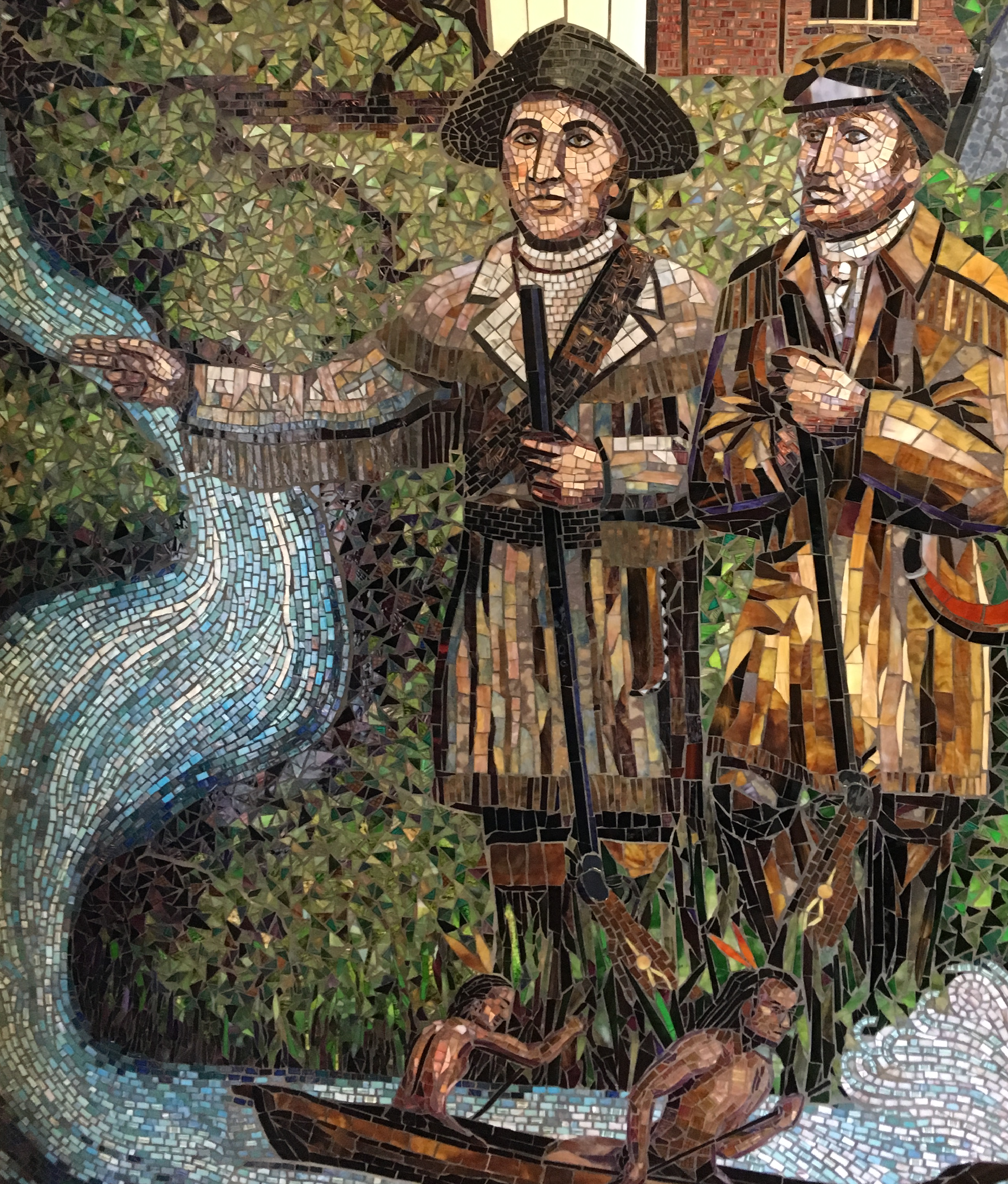
Lewis and Clark Mosaic image in Missouri

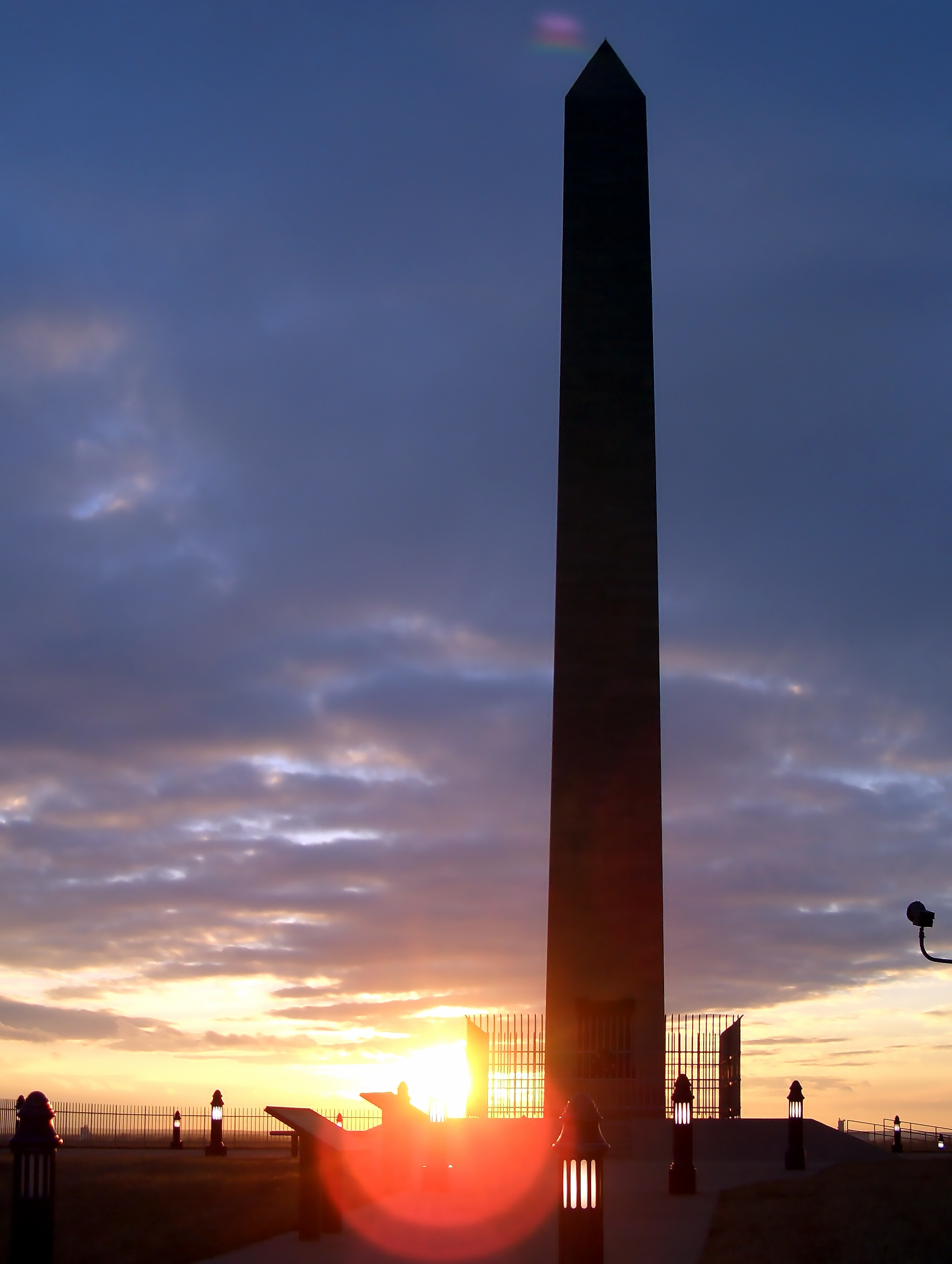
Sergeant Floyd Monument in Sioux City, Iowa is the first of 2,600 National Historic Landmarks in the United States

== Prior discoveries ==
In 1682, René-Robert Cavelier, Sieur de La Salle traveled down the Mississippi from the Great Lakes to the Gulf. The French then established a chain of posts along the Mississippi from New Orleans to the Great Lakes. There followed a number of French explorers including Pedro Vial and Pierre Antoine and Paul Mallet, among others. Vial may have preceded Lewis and Clark to Montana. In 1787, he gave a map of the upper Missouri River and locations of "territories transited by Pedro Vial" to Spanish authorities.

Early in 1792, the American explorer Robert Gray, sailing in the Columbia Rediviva, discovered the yet to be named Columbia River, named it after his ship and claimed it for the United States. Later in 1792, the Vancouver Expedition had learned of Gray's discovery and used his maps. Vancouver's expedition explored over 100 miles (160 km) up the Columbia, into the Columbia River Gorge. Lewis and Clark used the maps produced by these expeditions when they descended the lower Columbia to the Pacific coast.

From 1792 to 1793, Alexander Mackenzie had crossed North America from Quebec to the Pacific.

== See also ==
- The Far Horizons, a 1955 film about the expedition
- Gateway Arch National Park
- Lewis and Clark Pass (Montana) – the only non-motorized pass on the expedition's route
- Lewis and Clark's Keelboat
- James Kendall Hosmer, American history professor and librarian who edited and published Nicholas Biddle's account of Lewis and Clark's journal
- Timeline of the Lewis and Clark Expedition
- Dunbar and Hunter Expedition
- Red River Expedition (1806)
- Pike Expedition
- West Florida Controversy
- Adams-Onís Treaty

== Bibliography ==
- Allen, Paul (1902). History of the expedition under the command of Captains Lewis and Clark, Vol I. Toronto: George N. Morang & Co. Ltd.
- —— (1902). History of the expedition under the command of Captains Lewis and Clark, Vol II. Toronto:George N. Morang & Co. Ltd.
- —— (1902). History of the expedition under the command of Captains Lewis and Clark, Vol III. Toronto: George N. Morang & Co. Ltd.
- Ambrose, Stephen E. (1996). Undaunted Courage: Meriwether Lewis, Thomas Jefferson, and the Opening of the American West. New York: Simon & Schuster. p. 511. ISBN 9780684811079.
- Bennett, George D. (2002). The United States Army: Issues, Background and Bibliography. Nova Publishers. p. 229. ISBN 9781590333006.
- Bergon, Frank (1989). The Journals of Lewis and Clark. New York: Penguin Classics. ISBN 0142437360.
- Clark, Ella E.; Edmonds, Margot (1983). Sacagawea of the Lewis and Clark Expedition. University of California Press. p. 184. ISBN 9780520050600.
- Cutright, Paul Russel (1969). Lewis and Clark: Pioneering Naturalists. University of Nebraska Press.
- Cutright, Paul Russell (2000). Contributions of Philadelphia to Lewis and Clark History. Lewis and Clark Trail Heritage Foundation. p. 47. ISBN 9780967888705.
- DeVoto, Bernard Augustine (1997) [1953]. The Journals of Lewis and Clark. Houghton Mifflin Co. p. 504. ISBN 0-395-08380-X.
- —— (1998). The Course of Empire. Houghton Mifflin Harcourt. p. 647. ISBN 9780395924983.
- Fenelon, James; Defender-Wilson, Mary Louise (1985). "Voyage of Domination, 'Purchase' as Conquest, Sakakawea for Savagery: Distorted Icons from Misrepresentations of the Lewis and Clark Expedition". Wíčazo Ša Review. 19 (1). University of Minnesota Press: Wíčazo Ša Review, 85–104. doi:10.1353/wic.2004.0006. JSTOR 1409488. S2CID 147041160.
- Fresonke, Kris; Spence, Mark (2004). Lewis and Clark. University of California Press. p. 290. ISBN 9780520228399.
- Fritz, Harry W. (2004). The Lewis and Clark Expedition. Greenwood Publishing Group. p. 143. ISBN 978-0-313-31661-6.
- Furtwangler, Albert (1993). Acts of discovery: visions of America in the Lewis and Clark journals. University of Illinois Press. ISBN 978-0-252-06306-0.
- Gass, Patrick; MacGregor, Carol Lynn (1807). The Journals of Patrick Gass: Member of the Lewis and Clark Expedition. Mountain Press Publishing. p. 447.
- Gray, Edward (2004). "Visions of Another Empire: John Ledyard, an American Traveler across the Russian Empire, 1787–1788". Journal of the Early Republic. 24 (3). University of Pennsylvania Press: 347–380. JSTOR 4141438.
- Harris, Matthew L.; Buckley, Jay H. (2012). Zebulon Pike, Thomas Jefferson, and the Opening of the American West. University of Oklahoma Press. ISBN 9780806188317.
- Josephy, Alvin M. Jr.; Marc, Jaffe, eds. (2006). Lewis and Clark Through Indian Eyes. Random House Digital, Inc. p. 196. ISBN 9781400042678.
- Jackson, Donald (1993) [1981]. Thomas Jefferson & the Stony Mountains: Exploring the West from Monticello. University of Oklahoma Press. ISBN 978-0-8061-2504-6.
- Kleber, John (2001). The Encyclopedia of Louisville. University Press of Kentucky. p. 509. ISBN 978-0-8131-2100-0.
- Lavender, David Sievert (2001). The Way to the Western Sea: Lewis and Clark Across the Continent. University of Nebraska Press. p. 444. ISBN 9780803280038.
- Loomis, Noel M; Nasatir, Abraham P (1967). Pedro Vial and the Roads to Santa Fe. University of Oklahoma Press. ISBN 9780806111100.
- Miller, Robert J. Miller (2006). Native America, Discovered And Conquered: Thomas Jefferson, Lewis & Clark, And Manifest Destiny. Greenwood Publishing Group. p. 240. ISBN 9780275990114.
- Peters, Arthur K. (1996). Seven trail west. Abbeville Press. ISBN 1-55859-782-4.
- Rodriguez, Junius (2002). The Louisiana Purchase: a historical and geographical encyclopedia. ABC-CLIO, Santa Barbara, California. p. 513. ISBN 978-1-57607-188-5.
- Ronda, James P. (1984). Lewis & Clark among the Indians. University of Nebraska Press. p. 310. ISBN 9780803289901.
- Saindon, Robert A. (2003). Explorations Into the World of Lewis and Clark, Vol. 3. Digital Scanning Inc. p. 528. ISBN 9781582187655.
- Schwantes, Carlos (1996). The Pacific Northwest: an interpretive history. University of Nebraska Press. p. 568. ISBN 978-0-8032-9228-4.
- Uldrich, Jack (2004). Into the unknown: leadership lessons from Lewis & Clark's daring westward adventure. AMACOM Div American Mgmt Assn. p. 245. ISBN 0-8144-0816-8.
- Woodger, Elin; Toropov, Brandon (2009). Encyclopedia of the Lewis and Clark Expedition. Infobase Publishing. p. 438. ISBN 978-0-8160-4781-9.

=== Primary sources ===
- Lewis, Meriwether; Clark, William (2004). The Journals Of Lewis And Clark. Kessinger Publishing. p. 312. ISBN 9781419167997. E'books, Full view
- Lewis, Meriwether; Clark, William; Floyd, Charles; Whitehouse, Joseph (1905). Original Journals of the Lewis and Clark Expedition, 1804–1806, Vol. 6. New York: Dodd, Mead & Co. p. 280.
- Lewis, Meriwether; Clark, William (2003). Bergon, Frank (ed.). The Journals of Lewis & Clark. Penguin. p. 560. ISBN 9780142437360.
- Lewis, Meriwether (1811). The Travels of Captains Lewis and Clarke, from St. Louis, by way of the Missouri and Columbia Rivers, to the Paciﬁc Ocean; performed in the Years 1804, 1805, and 1806. By Order of the Government of the United States; containing Delineations of the Manners, Customs, Religion, &c. of the Indians; compiled from various authentic Sources and original Documents; and a summary of the Statistical View of the Indian Nations, from the official communication of Meriwether Lewis. In 8vo. illustrated with a Map of the Country inhabited by the Tribes of Western Indians. ("This is an interesting volume, and exhibits not only some valuable geographical notices, but very copious and amusing details respecting the manners, habits, and divisions of the India North America Tribes.") Modern Publications, and New Editions of Valuable Standard Works. In: The Quarterly Review, February 1811, p. 2.
- Lewis, Meriwether; Clark, William (1815). Travels to the source of the Missouri river and across the American continent to the Pacific ocean. Performed by order of the government of the United States, in the years 1804, 1805, and 1806. By Captains Lewis and Clarke. Published from the official report, and illustrated by a map of the route, and other maps. London: Longman, Hurst, Rees, Orme & Brown.
  - "Review of Travels to the Source of the Missouri River ... ". The Quarterly Review. 12: 317–368. January 1815.
- Lewis, William; Clark, Clark (1903). Hosmer, James Kendall (ed.). History of the Expedition of Captain Lewis and Clark, 1804–5–6, Volume 1. Chicago: A.C. McClurg & Co. p. 500.
- Coues, Elliott; Lewis, Meriwether; Clark, William; Jefferson, Thomas (1893). History of the expedition under the command of Lewis and Clark: Vol. 1. New York: Francis P. Harper. p. 1364.
- ——; Lewis, Meriwether; Clark, William; Jefferson, Thomas (1893). History of the expedition under the command of Lewis and Clark: Volume 2. New York: Francis P. Harper. p. 1364.
- ——; Lewis, Meriwether; Clark, William; Jefferson, Thomas (1893). History of the expedition under the command of Lewis and Clark: Vol. 3. Francis P. Harper, New York. p. 1298.
- ——; Lewis, Meriwether; Clark, William; Jefferson, Thomas (1893). History of the expedition under the command of Lewis and Clark: Vol. 4. New York: Francis P. Harper. p. 1298.
- Jackson, Donald Dean (1962). Letters of the Lewis and Clark Expedition: with related documents, 1783–1854. University of Illinois Press (Original from the University of Virginia). p. 728.
- Lewis, Meriwether; Clark, William (2004). Moulton, Gary E. (ed.). The Definitive Journals of Lewis & Clark. University of Nebraska Press. p. 357. ISBN 9780803280328.
