= Trail's End Kentucky Straight Bourbon Whiskey =

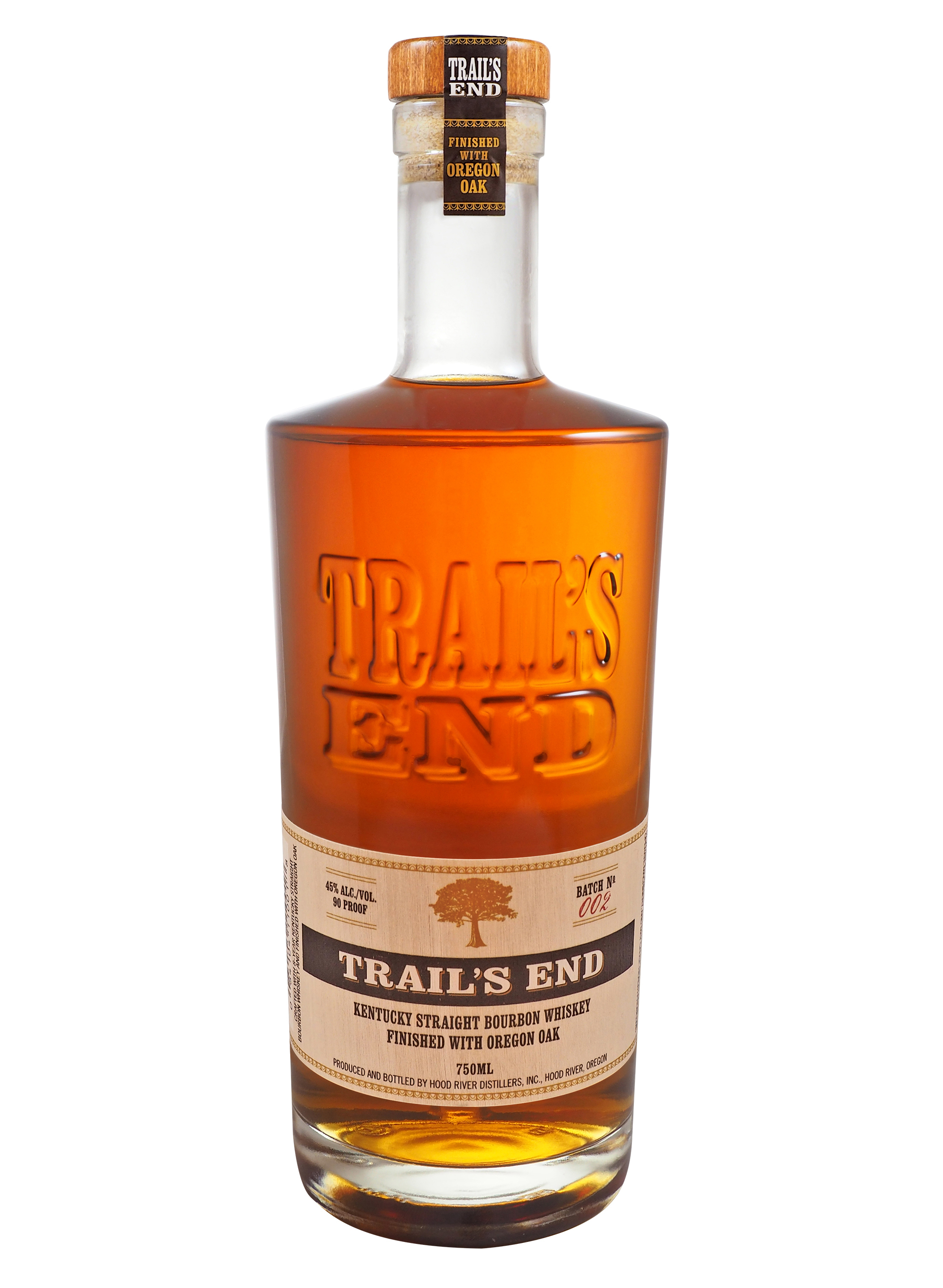
A bottle from Batch #002.

Trail's End is a brand of Kentucky Straight Bourbon Whiskey. It is distributed exclusively by Hood River Distillers.

== Process ==
Trail's End is aged in new charred white oak barrels for eight years or ten years in Kentucky. It is made with a traditional mash bill of corn, malted barley and approximately 10% rye. Once in Oregon, it is steeped with Oregon oak, then finished with glacier-fed spring water from Mount Hood and bottled at 90 proof. Trail's End is non-chill filtered.

== Awards ==
- 2016 San Francisco World Spirits Competition: Double Gold
- 2016 Ultimate Spirits Challenge: 95 Points, Extraordinary, Ultimate Recommendation
- 2016 The Spirits International Prestige (SIP) Awards: Gold Medal

== See also ==
- Waterbury, Margarett. "WHISKEY REVIEW: TRAIL'S END BOURBON". The Whiskey Wash. Retrieved 23 August 2016.
