= Missile launch facility =

Underground structure for launching missiles

Topol-M launch from silo

A missile launch facility, also known as an underground missile silo, launch facility (LF), or nuclear silo, is a vertical cylindrical structure constructed underground, for the storage and launching of intercontinental ballistic missiles (ICBMs), intermediate-range ballistic missiles (IRBMs), or medium-range ballistic missiles (MRBMs). Similar facilities can be used for anti-ballistic missiles (ABMs).

The structures typically have the missile some distance below ground, protected by a large "blast door" on top. They are usually connected, physically and/or electronically, to a missile launch control center.

With the introduction of the Soviet UR-100 and the U.S. Titan II missile series, underground silos changed in the 1960s. Both missile series introduced the use of hypergolic propellant, which could be stored in the missiles, allowing for rapid launches. Both countries' liquid-fueled missile systems were moved into underground silos. The introduction of solid fuel systems, in the later 1960s, made the silo moving and launching even easier.

The underground missile silo has remained the primary missile basing system and launch facility for land-based missiles since the 1960s.

Other than underground facilities, ballistic missiles can be launched from above-ground facilities, or can be launched from mobile platforms, e.g. transporter erector launchers, railcars, ballistic missile submarines or airplanes.

== Nazi Germany ==
The La Coupole facility is the earliest known precursor to modern underground missile silos still in existence. It was built by the forces of Nazi Germany in northern Occupied France, between 1943 and 1944, to serve as a launch base for V-2 rockets. The facility was designed with an immense concrete dome to store a large stockpile of V-2s, warheads and fuel, and was intended to launch V-2s on an industrial scale. Dozens of missiles a day were to be fuelled, prepared and rolled just outdoors of the facility's concrete casing, launched from either of two outdoor launch pads in rapid sequence against London and southern England. A similar-purpose but less-developed facility, the Blockhaus d'Eperlecques, had also been built, some 14.4 kilometers (8.9 miles) north-northwest of La Coupole, and closer to intended targets in southeastern England.

Following repeated heavy bombing by Allied forces during Operation Crossbow, the Germans were unable to complete construction of the works and the complex never entered service. The United Kingdom conducted post-war investigations, determining that it was "an assembly site for long projectiles most conveniently handled and prepared in a vertical position".

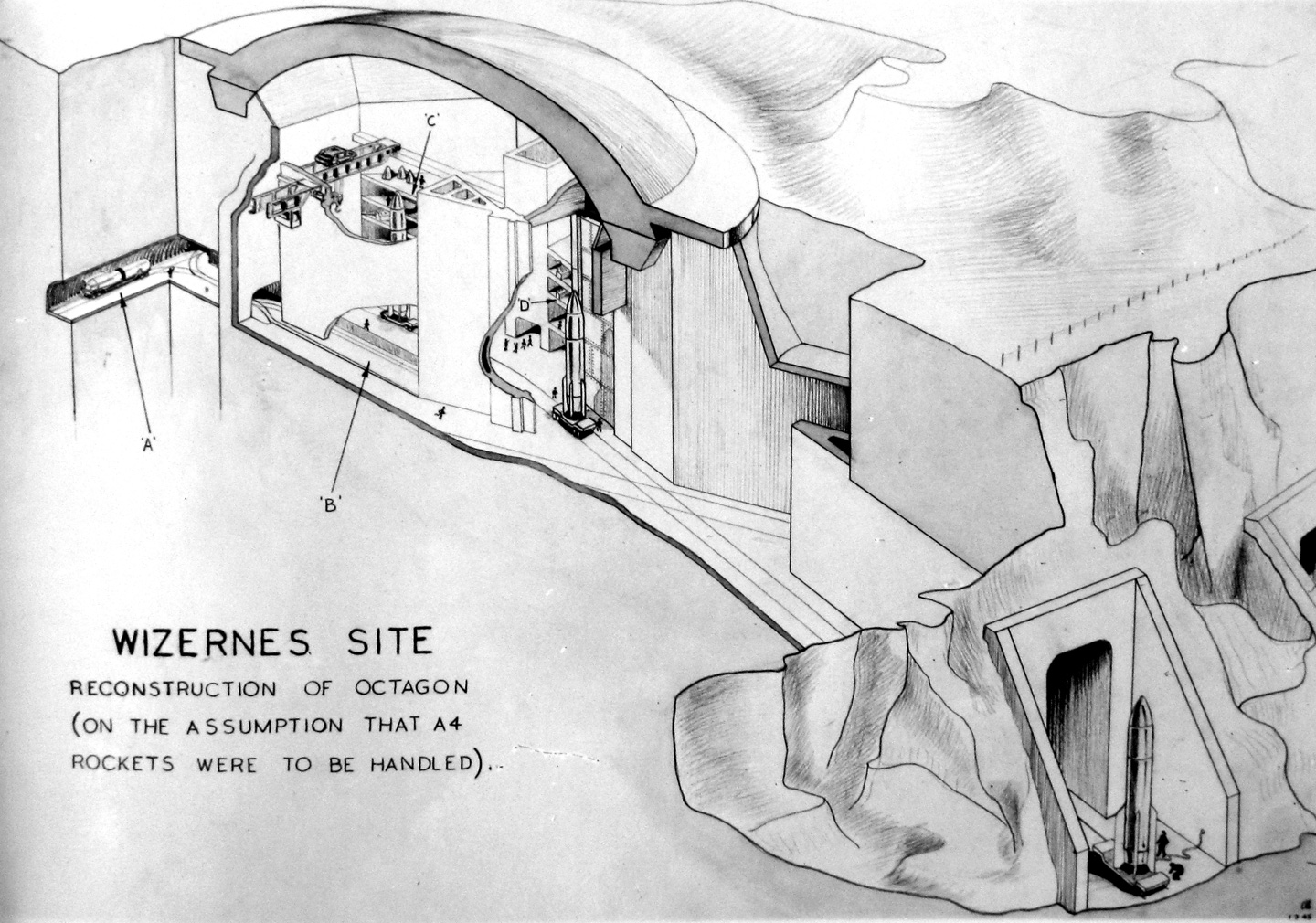
1944 conjectural reconstruction of the rocket preparation chamber and tunnels (on the assumption that A4 rockets were to be handled).

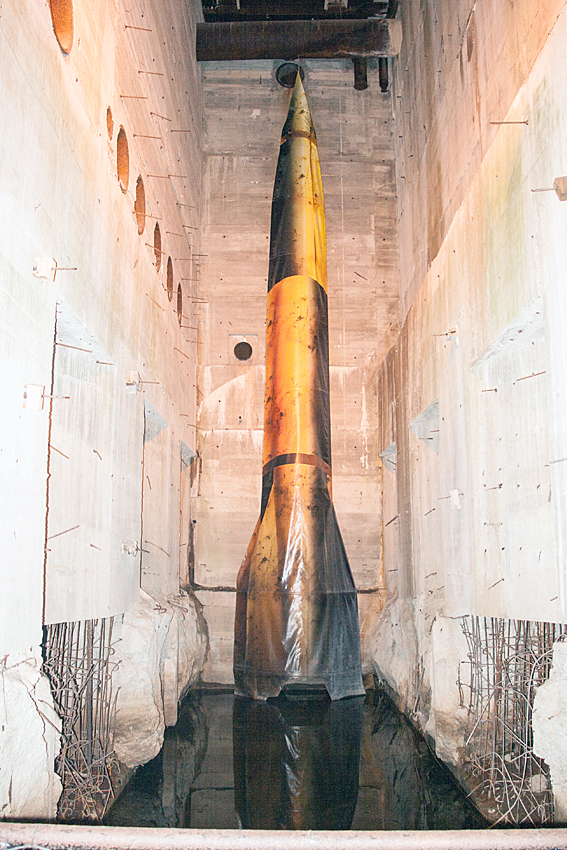
Impression of a V2 in the assembly hall at Éperleques.

== United States ==
The British idea of an underground missile silo was adopted and developed by the United States for missile launch facilities for its intercontinental ballistic missiles. Most silos were based in Colorado, Nebraska, North Dakota, South Dakota, Missouri, Montana, Wyoming and other western states. There were three main reasons behind this siting: reducing the flight trajectory between the United States and the Soviet Union, since the missiles would travel north over Canada and the North Pole; increasing the flight trajectory from SLBMs on either seaboard, giving the silos more warning time in the event of a nuclear war; and locating obvious targets as far away as possible from major population centres. They had many defense systems to keep out intruders and other defense systems to prevent destruction (see Safeguard Program). In addition to the three previously mentioned siting reasons, the US Air Force had other site requirements that were also taken into account such as, having the sites be close enough to a populace of roughly 50,000 people for community support along with making sure launch locations were far enough apart that a 10 MT detonation on or near strategic locations would not knock out other launch facilities in the area. "In 1960 the US Army established the Corps of Engineers Ballistic Missile Construction Office (CEBMCO), an independent organization under the Chief of Engineers, to supervise construction". This newly established organization was able to produce Minutemen Launch silos at an extremely fast rate of ~1.8 per day from 1961 to 1966 where they built a total of 1,000 Minuteman missile silos.

The United States built many missile silos in the Midwest, away from populated areas. Many were built in Colorado, Nebraska, South Dakota, and North Dakota. The U.S. spent considerable effort and funds in the 1970s and 1980s designing a replacement, but none of the new and complex system designs were ever produced.

The United States has many silo-based warheads in service, however, they have lowered their number to around 1800 and have transferred most of their missiles to nuclear submarines and are focusing on more advanced conventional weapons.

Today they are still used, although many have been decommissioned and hazardous materials removed. The increase of decommissioned missile silos has led governments to sell some of them to private individuals. Some buyers convert them into unique homes, advanced safe rooms, or use them for other purposes. They are popular sites of urban exploration.

=== Atlas facilities ===
The Atlas missiles used four different storage and launching methods.

- The first version were vertical and above-ground launchers, at Vandenberg Air Force Base on the Central Coast of California.
- The second version were stored horizontally in a shed-like structure with a retractable roof, to then be raised to the vertical and launched, at Francis E. Warren Air Force Base in Wyoming.
- The third version were stored horizontally, but better protected in a concrete building known as a "coffin", then raised to the vertical shortly before launch. These rather poorly protected designs were a consequence of the cryogenic liquid fuels used, which required the missiles to be stored unfueled and then be fueled immediately prior to launch.
- The fourth version were stored vertically in underground silos, for the Atlas F ICBM. They were fueled in the silo, and then since they could not be launched from within the silo, were raised to the surface to launch.

In 2000 William Leonard Pickard and a partner were convicted, in the largest lysergic acid diethylamide (LSD) manufacturing case in history, of conspiracy to manufacture large quantities of LSD in a decommissioned SM-65 Atlas missile silo (548-7) near Wamego, Kansas.

=== Titan facilities ===
The Titan I missile used a similar silo basing of the fourth Atlas version.

LGM-25C Titan II (deactivated) ICBMs were in a one ICBM launch control center (LCC) with one LF configuration (1 × 1). Titan missiles (both I and II) were located near their command and control operations personnel. Access to the missile was through tunnels connecting the launch control center and launch facility. An example of this can be seen at the Titan Missile Museum, located south of Tucson, Arizona.

Notable accidents:

- Fire in Titan II silo 373-4 – 1965 Searcy missile silo fire
- Titan II explosion in silo 374-7 – 1980 Damascus Titan missile explosion

=== Minuteman facilities ===
United States LGM-30 Minuteman ICBM nuclear weapon system and silo operational development, 1974.

The solid fueled LGM-30 series Minuteman I, II, III, and Peacekeeper ICBM configurations consist of one LCC that controls ten LFs (1 × 10). Five LCCs and their fifty associated LFs make up a squadron. Three squadrons make up a wing. Measures were taken such that if any one LCC was disabled, a separate LCC within the squadron would take control of its ten ICBMs.

The LGM-30 LFs and LCCs are separated by several miles, connected only electronically. This distance ensures that a nuclear attack could only disable a very small number of ICBMs, leaving the rest capable of being launched immediately.

=== Peacekeeper facilities ===
Dense Pack was a proposed configuration strategy for basing LGM-118 Peacekeeper ICBMs, developed under the Reagan administration, for the purpose of maximizing their survivability in case of a surprise nuclear first-strike on their silos conducted by a hostile foreign power. According to the Dense Pack strategy, a series of ten to twelve hardened silos would be grouped closely together in a line. The idea was that to disable the Dense Pack, the enemy would have to launch many missiles, and the missiles would arrive at different times. The missiles arriving later would have to pass through the debris cloud of the first missile's explosion, damaging the follow-up missiles and limiting their effectiveness. The proposed Dense Pack initiative met with strong criticism in the media and in the government, and the idea was never implemented.

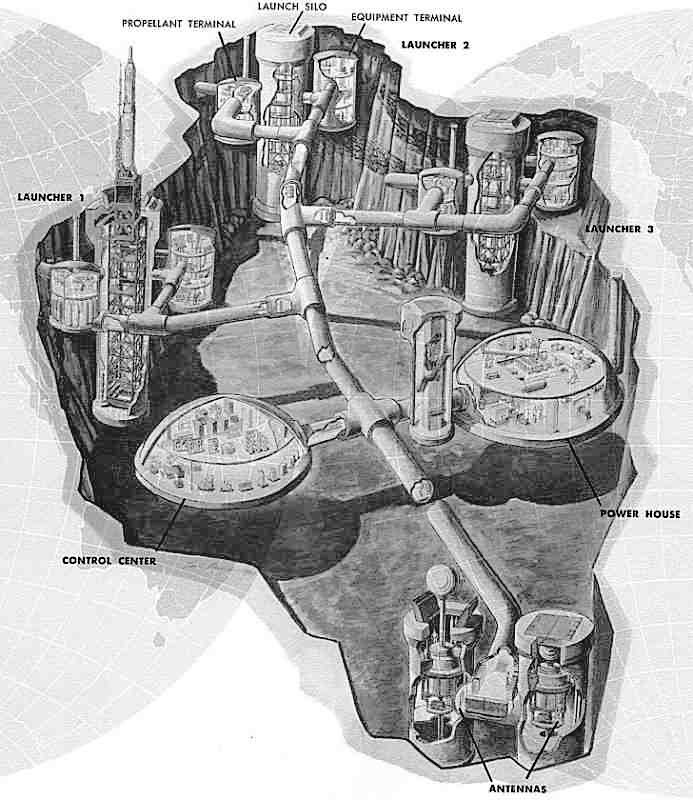
Titan I missile complex.

Titan I missile complex 2A.

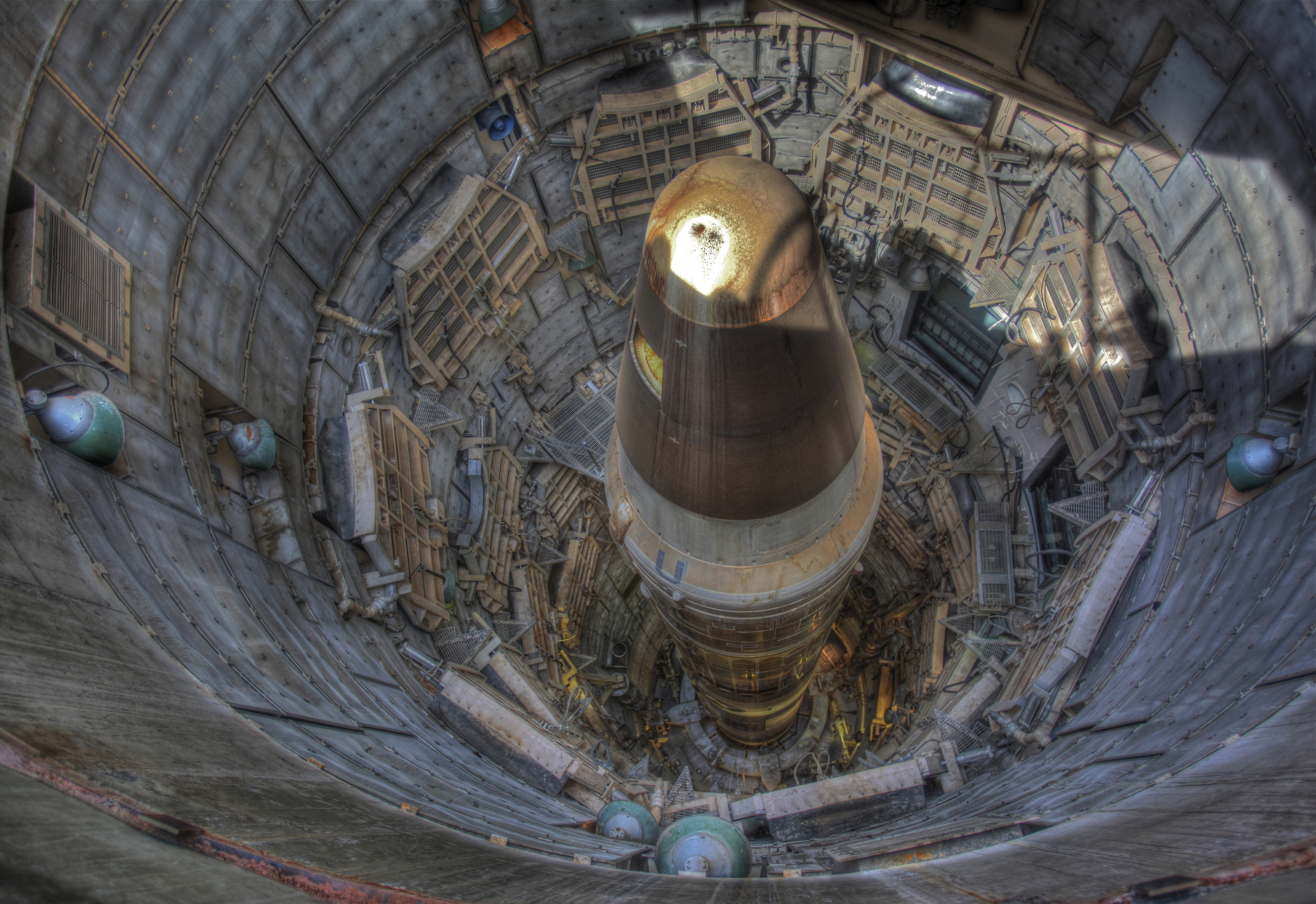
Titan II ICBM in 571-7 site silo.

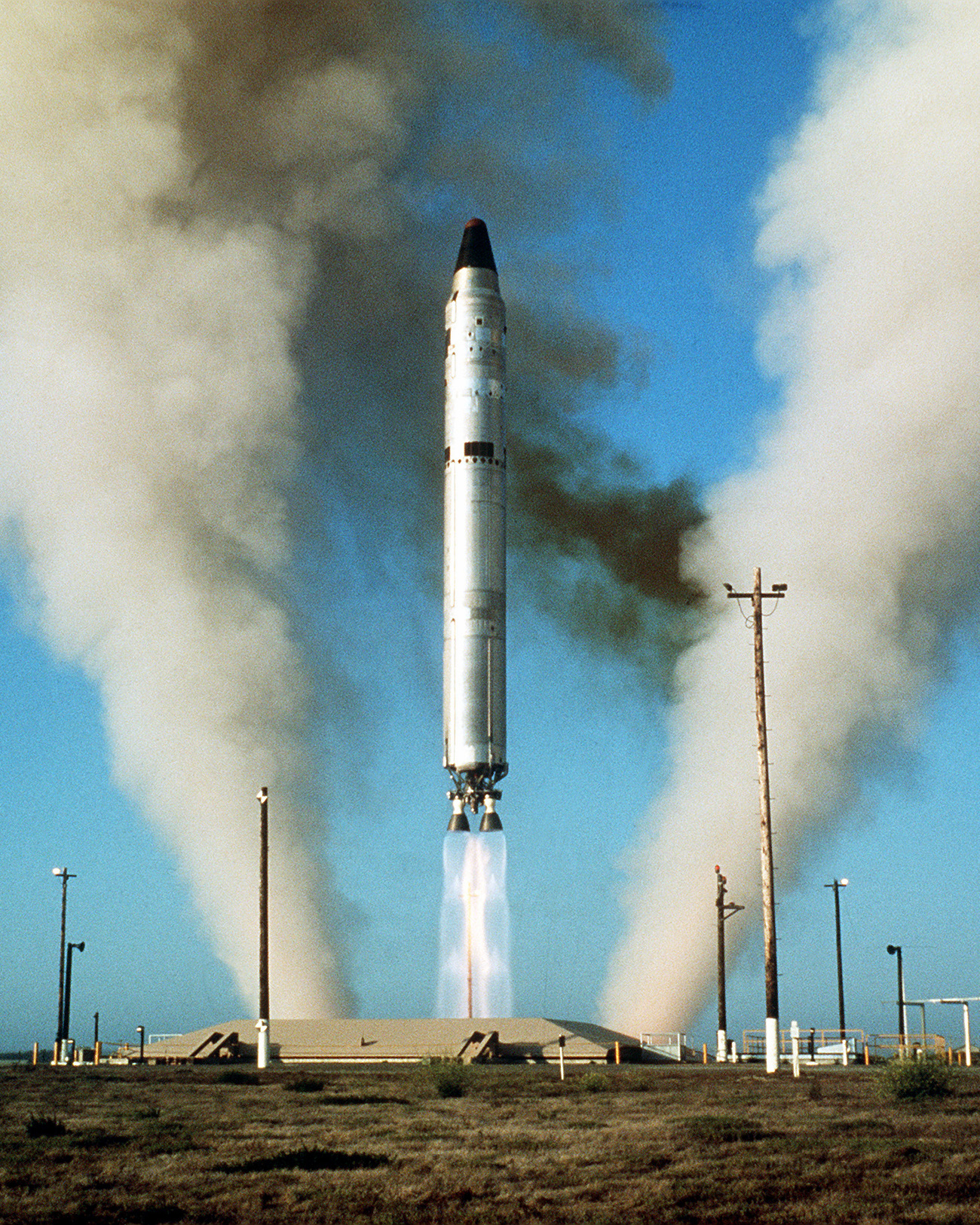
Titan-II ICBM silo test launch, Vandenberg Air Force Base.

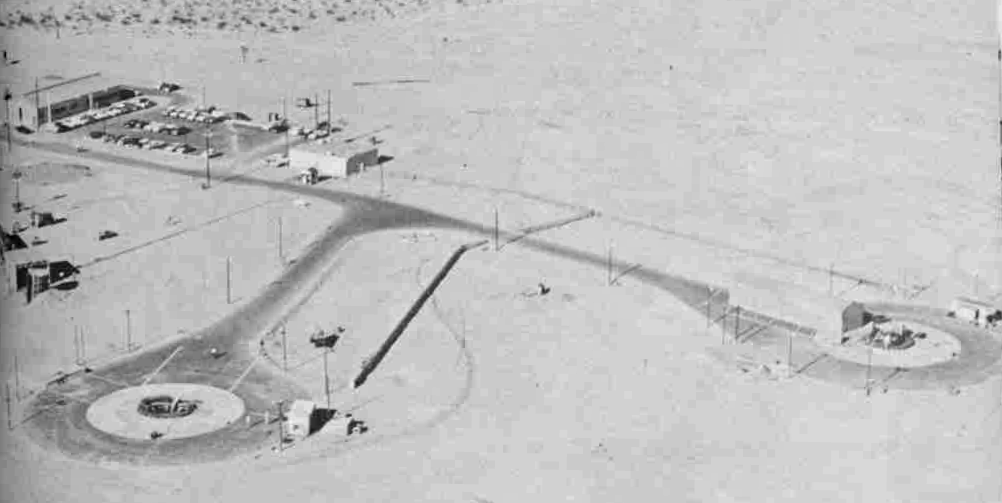
Minuteman I test silos at Edwards AFB.

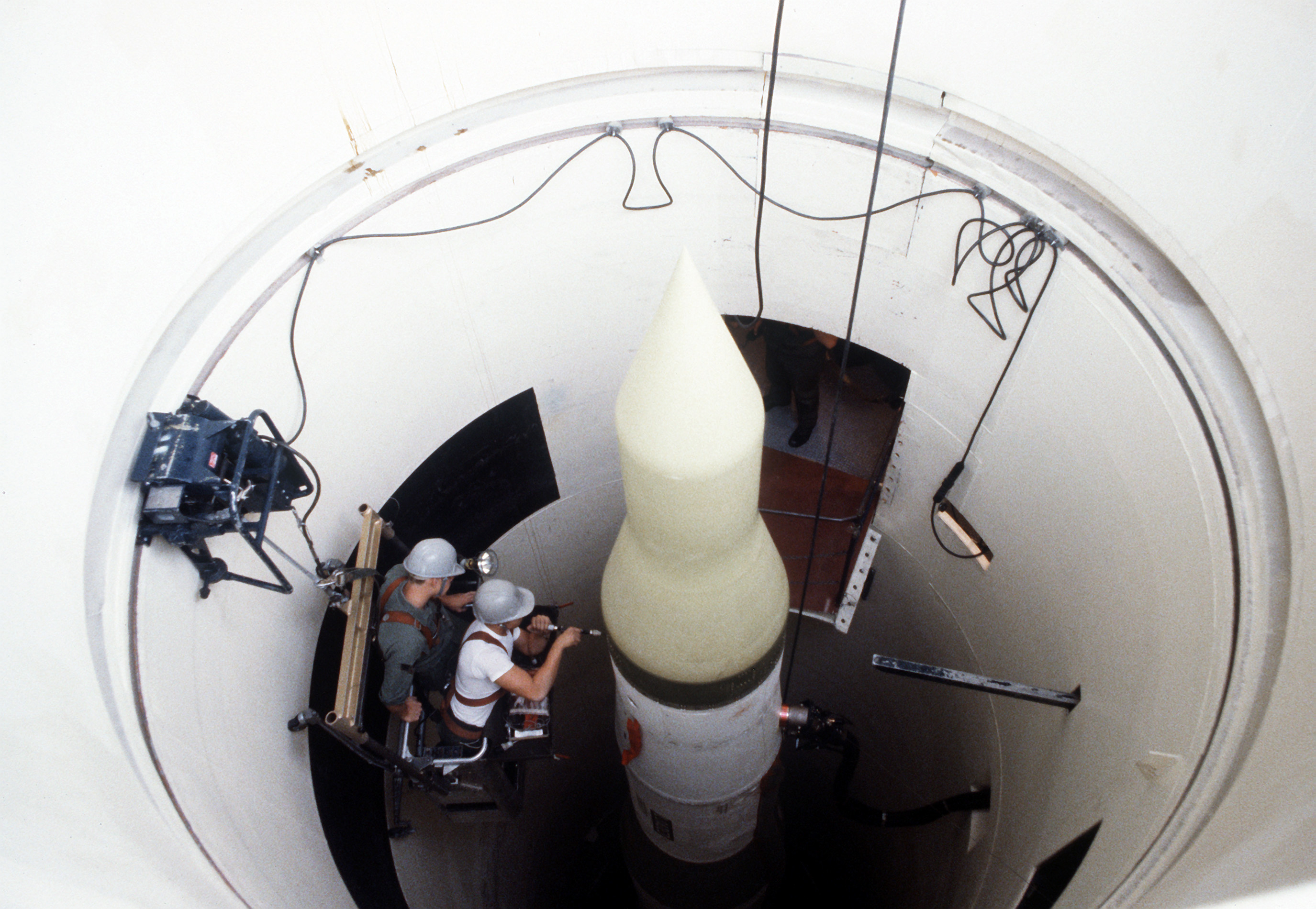
U.S. Minuteman II missile being worked on, in its underground silo launch facility.

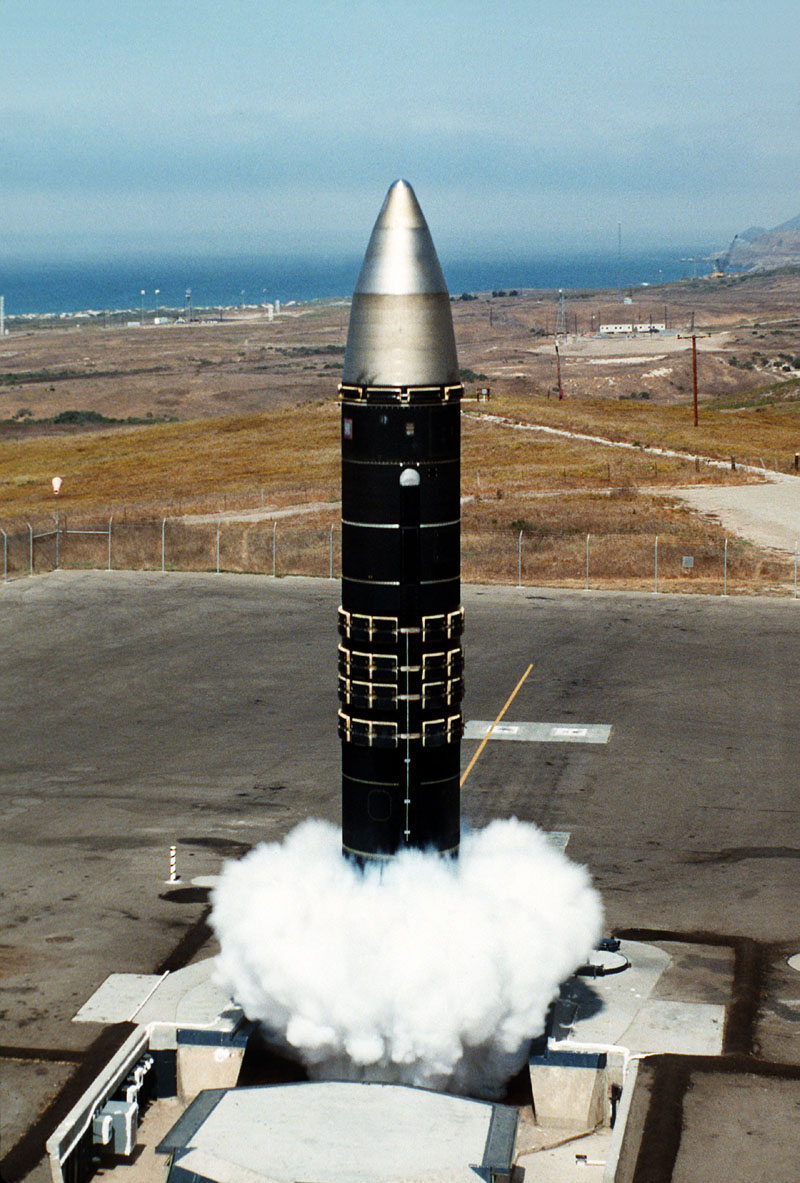
U.S. Peacekeeper MX missile launches from its underground silo launch facility.

Minuteman III ICBM Launch Control Facility November-1.

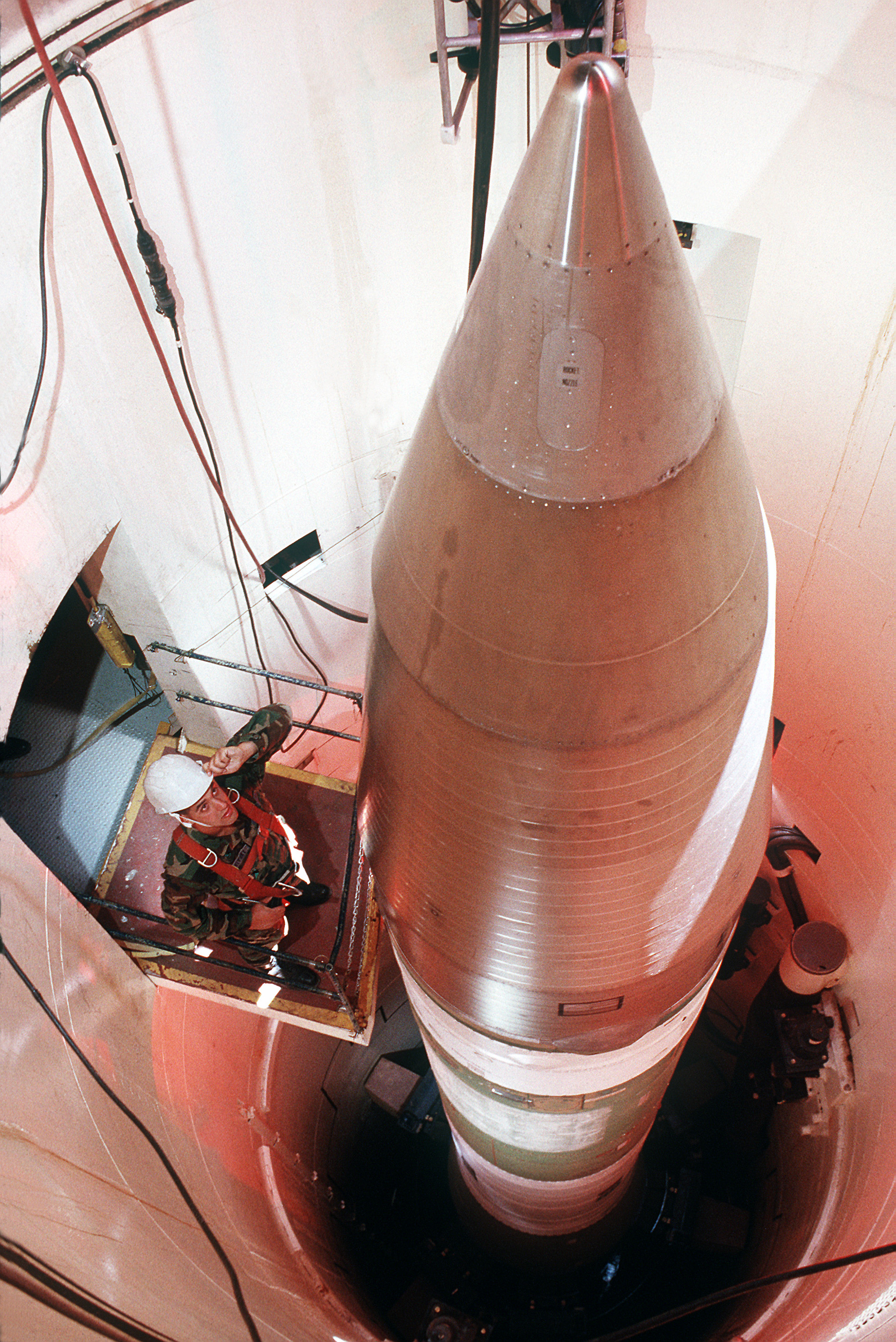
A Minuteman-III missile in its silo.

== Soviet Union ==
The former Soviet Union had missile silos in Russia and adjacent Soviet states during the Cold War, such as the Plokštinė missile base in Lithuania. The Main Centre for Missile Attack Warning, near Solnechnogorsk outside Moscow, was completed by the Soviet Union in 1971, and remains in use by the Russian Federation.

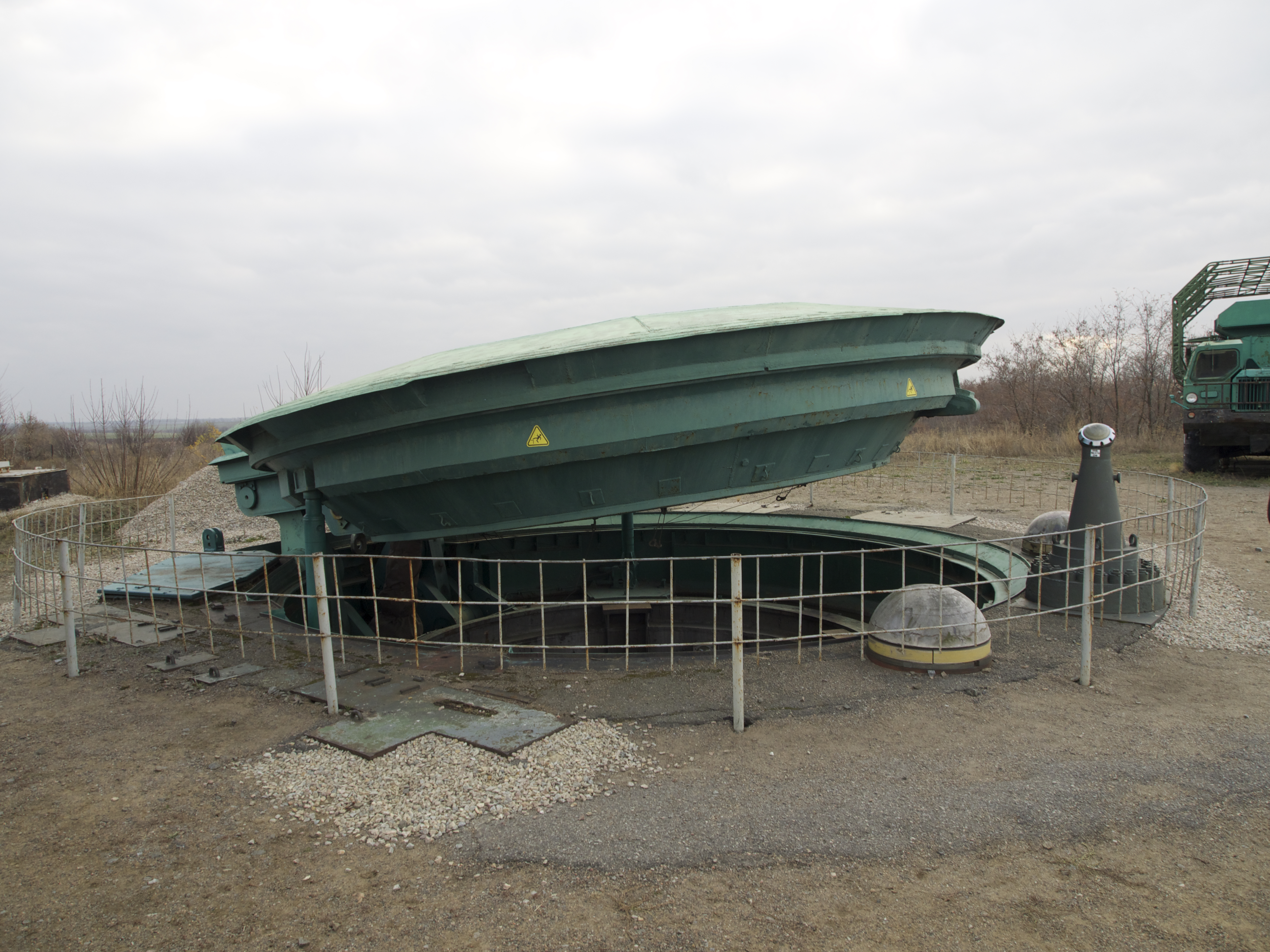
RT-23/SS-24 Molodets ICBM silo near Pervomaysk Ukraine.

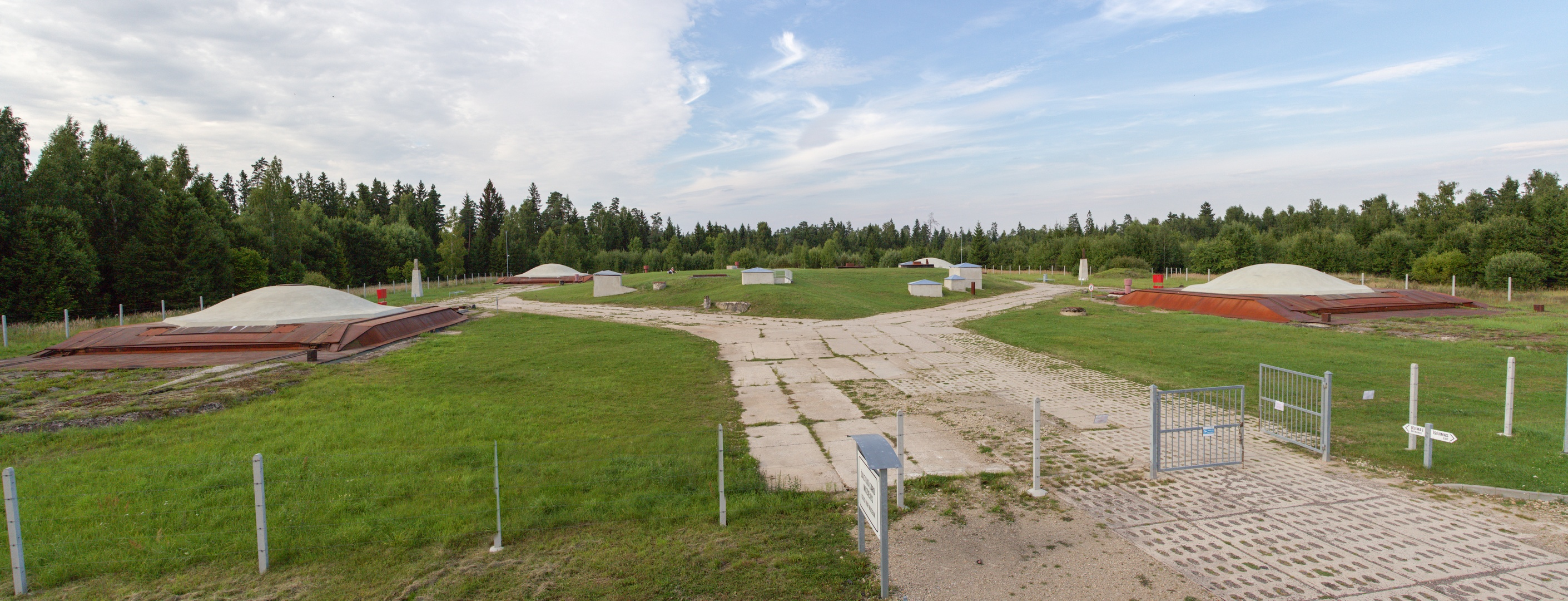
Plokštinė R-12 Dvina MRBM base.

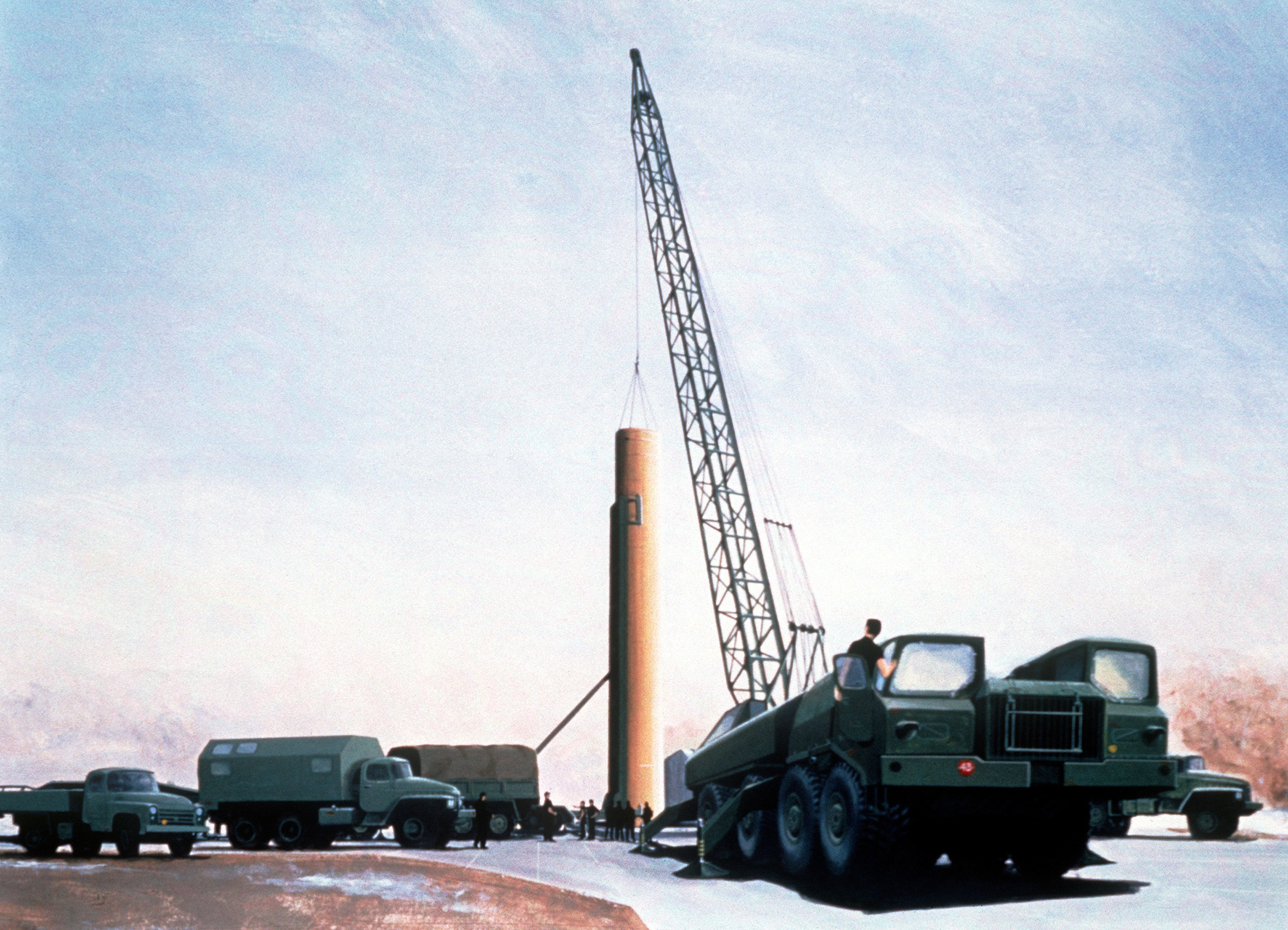
R-36 missile being lowered into a missile silo.

== United Kingdom ==
The United Kingdom did not have any operational silo ICBMs. The Blue Streak missile was intended to be deployed in silos around the country and began construction on a prototype, but the project was cancelled before it could be finished. During the 1960s several surface based erector launcher pads for Thor IRBMs were installed but were removed just a few years later when Blue Steel-carrying V bombers came into service.

== Russia ==
Russia has silo-based weapons. The Strategic Rocket Forces of the Russian Federation (RVSN RF) (Strategic Missile Troops) controls Russia's land-based inter-continental ballistic missiles.

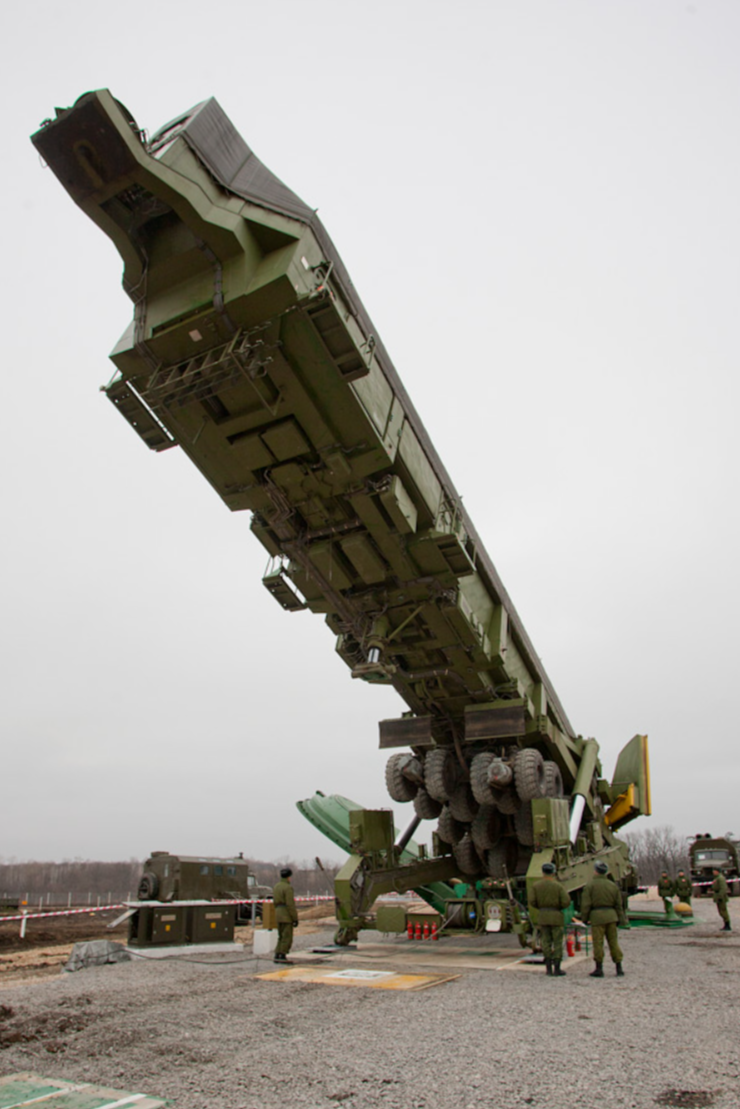
Loading ICBM Topol-M into the launch silo.

== France ==
France built missile silos for the S-2 MRBM and S-3 IRBM on the Albion Plateau. They were in service from 1971 to 1996.

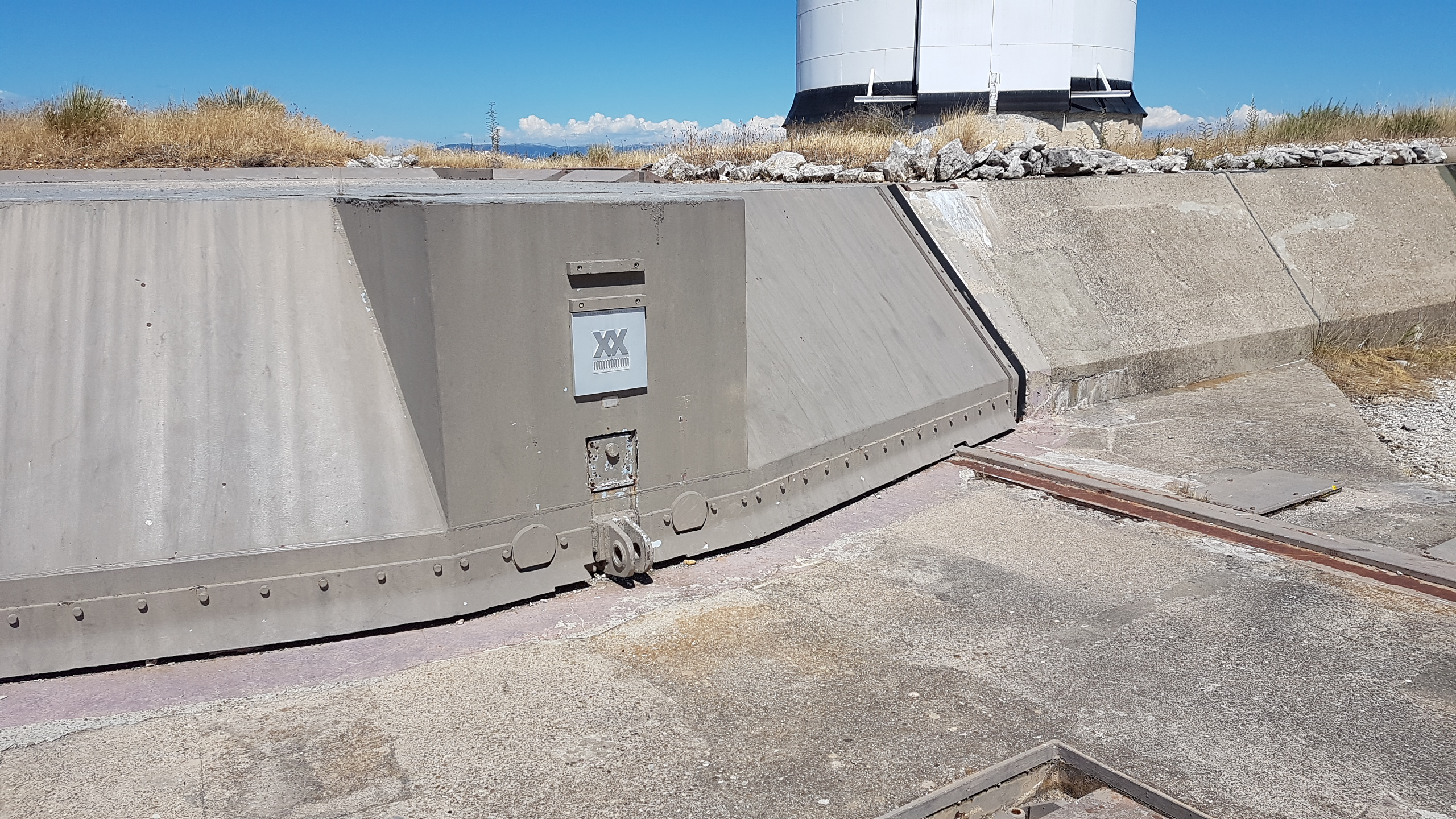
Missile silo cover at Sirene Observatory, Plateau d'Albion.

== China ==
China has silo-based weapons, but is now concentrating development on expanding its submarine and road-capable mobile weapons, especially for tunnel networks.

In December 2025, the U.S. Department of Defense's China Military Power Report stated that China had loaded more than 100 DF-31 ICBMs with solid propellant in silos near its border with Mongolia.

== India ==
India uses silos for a few of its long-range ballistic missile arsenal and storage, but most of its systems are road mobile capable.

== Pakistan ==
Pakistan has built hard and deeply buried storage and launch facilities to retain a second strike capability in a nuclear war.

== North Korea ==
North Korea built a missile silo complex south of Paektu Mountain. The silos are reportedly designed for mid- to long-range missiles, but it is not clear if all of them are operational.

== Iran ==
Iran has silo-based weapons, having built a system of underground missile silos to protect missiles from detection and (above-ground) launch facilities from aerial destruction.

== Israel ==
It is believed that Israel has MRBM and ICBM launch facilities.

== Museums ==
- Titan Missile Museum Titan II ICBM 571-7 site
- Minuteman Missile National Historic Site Minuteman II ICBM LCC + D-09 silo
- Quebec-One Missile Alert Facility Peacekeeper ICBM Q-01 site
- Ronald Reagan Minuteman Missile State Historic Site Minuteman II ICBM O-01 MAF + N-33 LF
- Strategic missile forces museum in Ukraine RT-23/SS-24 Molodets ICBM UCP + silo
- Plokštinė missile base R-12 Dvina MRBM base
- Nike Missile Site SF-88 Nike 2B/12H, 20A/8L-U ABM SF-88 site
- RSL-3 Safeguard Program Remote Sprint Launchers 3 site

== See also ==
- Missile launch control center
- Cheyenne Mountain Complex
- Safeguard/Sentinel ABM system
- A-35 anti-ballistic missile system
- A-135 anti-ballistic missile system
- List of Nike missile sites
