= Concrete, North Dakota =

Place in North Dakota, United States

Coordinates: 48°44′44″N 97°56′04″W

Concrete, North Dakota, established early in the 20th century, was a townsite to support the cement mine southwest of the town at the base of the Pembina Escarpment. It is located just north of the Tongue River on the east edge of Beaulieu Township, in the northeast quarter of Section 30, in Pembina County.

== Railroad ==
Despite the assurances of geologists associated with the University of North Dakota, the quality of the cement was too poor to be commercially profitable. They hoodwinked the businessmen of the towns of Mountain and Gardar and the many farmers along the way to support building a railroad, to branch from the Great Northern Railway line at Edinburg to the cement mine, then absconded shortly after completion of the Northern Dakota Railway. The railroad remained in operation for about two decades, but was never feasible.

Concrete likely reached its maximum size in 1909, the year the cement mine closed. The town shrank and now is basically a ghost town.

== Mickelsen Safeguard Complex ==
About two miles southeast of the Concrete townsite, created as part of its SAFEGUARD anti-ballistic missile program, the Department of Defense in the mid-1970s built one site of the Stanley R. Mickelsen Safeguard Complex. The complex, named Cavalier Air Force Station, housed the newly constructed early warning AN/FPQ-16 Perimeter Acquisition Radar (PAR) built by the General Electric. The radar was called the Concrete Missile Early Warning System. Later, the installation was named Cavalier Air Force Station in consideration of its proximity to Cavalier, North Dakota. Now a part of the U.S. Space Force, the name is Cavalier Space Force Station.

== Amateur radio restrictions ==
The US Code of Federal Regulations specifies that amateur radio operators within 99 miles (160 km) of Concrete must not transmit with more than 50 watts of power on the 0.43 GHz (70 cm) frequency band, presumably to avoid interfering with the radar.
