= RSL-3 =

- U.S. National Register of Historic Places
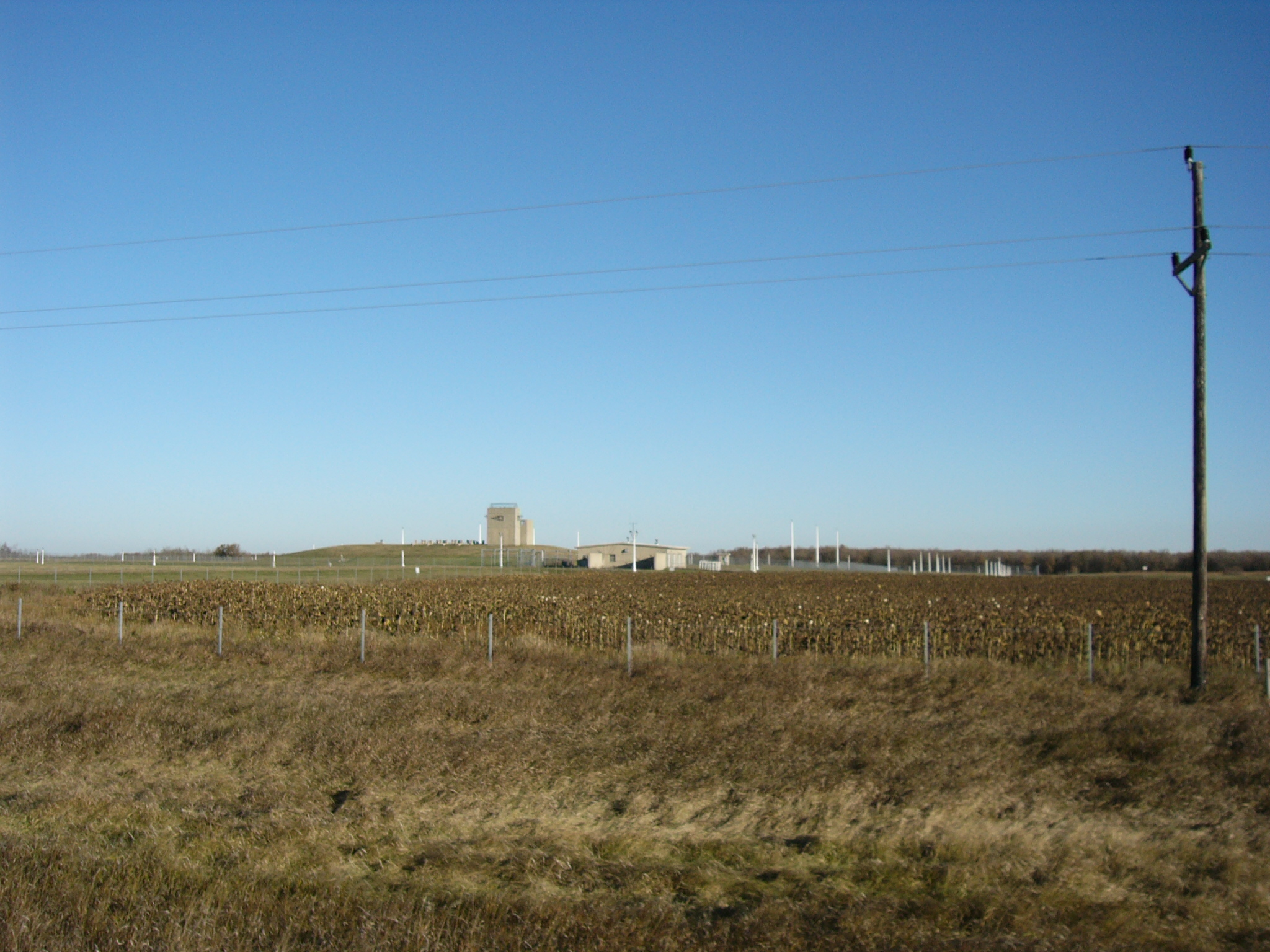

- Location within North Dakota Location within the United States
- Location: 12329 ND 5, near Concrete, North Dakota
- Coordinates: 48°45′52.4″N 97°59′09.7″W
- NRHP reference No.: 100003053
- Added to NRHP: October 23, 2018

RSL-3, is a Remote Sprint Launch facility in Cavalier County, North Dakota near Concrete. It was listed on the National Register of Historic Places in 2018.

Part of the Safeguard missile defense program, RSL-3 is one of four Remote Sprint Launch sites that were built in northeastern North Dakota as part of the Stanley R. Mickelsen Safeguard Complex, the first anti-ballistic missile system built in the United States.

The site is open for public tours in the summer.
