= Safeguard Program =

System designed to protect U.S. missile silos (1969–1976)

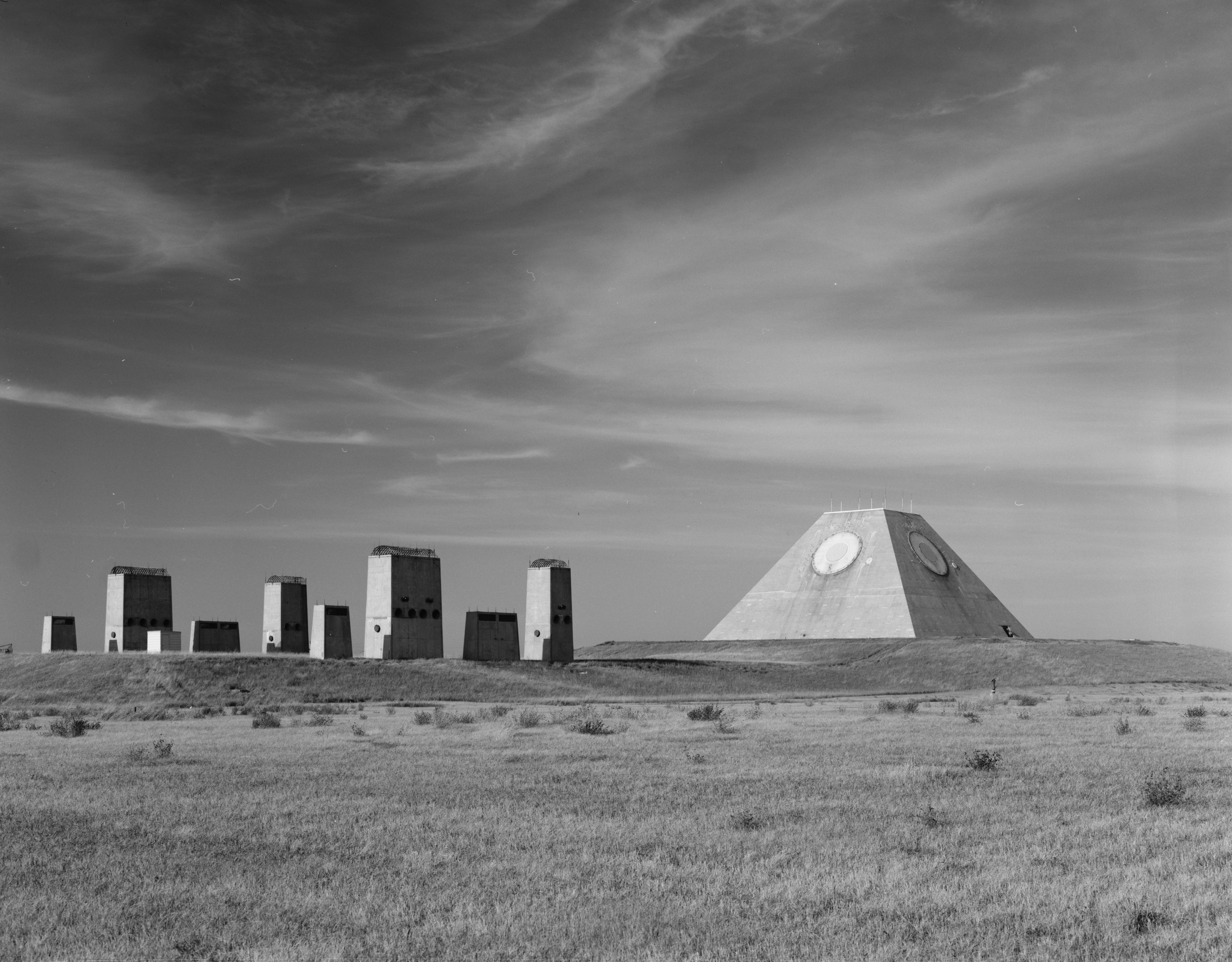
The Stanley R. Mickelsen Safeguard Complex Missile Site Radar, one of the prominent features of the only completed complex under the Safeguard Program; radar and underground control building on the right, underground power plant on the left.

The Safeguard Program was a U.S. Army anti-ballistic missile (ABM) system designed to protect the U.S. Air Force's Minuteman ICBM silos from attack, thus preserving the US's nuclear deterrent fleet. It was intended primarily to protect against the very small Chinese ICBM fleet, limited Soviet attacks and various other limited-launch scenarios. A full-scale attack by the Soviets would easily overwhelm it. It was designed to allow gradual upgrades to provide similar lightweight coverage over the entire United States over time.

Safeguard was the ultimate development of an ever-changing series of designs produced by Bell Labs that started in the 1950s with the LIM-49 Nike Zeus. By 1960 it was clear that Zeus offered almost no protection against a sophisticated attack using decoys. A new design emerged, Nike-X, with the ability to defend against attacks with hundreds of warheads and thousands of decoys, but the cost of the system was enormous. Looking for alternatives, the Sentinel program offered a lightweight cover that would protect against limited attacks. Sentinel began construction in 1968 but ran into a firestorm of protest over its bases being placed in suburban areas. In March 1969, incoming President Richard M. Nixon announced that Sentinel would be cancelled and redirected to protect the missile farms, and that its bases would be placed well away from any civilian areas.

The debate about ABM protection of US ICBMs had been going on for over a decade when Safeguard was announced, and the arguments against such a system were well known both in the military and civilian circles. In military circles, the most basic argument against Safeguard was that adding an ABM requires the Soviets to build another ICBM to counter it, but the same is true if the US builds another ICBM instead. The Air Force was far more interested in building more of their own ICBMs than Army ABMs, and lobbied against the Army continually. In the public sphere, opinion by the late 1960s was anti-military in general, and in an era of ongoing Strategic Arms Limitation Talks the entire concept was derided as sabre rattling. Safeguard had been developed to calm opposition but found itself just as heavily opposed. Nixon pressed ahead in spite of objections and complaints about limited performance, and the reasons for his strong support remains a subject of debate among historians and political commentators.

Through the Safeguard era, talks between the US and Soviet Union originally started by President Lyndon B. Johnson were continuing. The Anti-Ballistic Missile Treaty of 1972 limited the US and Soviet Union to two ABM sites each. Safeguard was scaled back to sites in North Dakota and Montana, abandoning initial work at a site in Missouri, and cancelling all other planned bases. Construction on the two remaining bases continued until 1974, when an additional agreement limited both countries to a single ABM site. The Montana site was abandoned with the main radar partially completed. The remaining base in North Dakota, the Stanley R. Mickelsen Safeguard Complex, became active on 1 April 1975 and fully operational on 1 October 1975. By that time the House Appropriations Committee had already voted to deactivate it. The base was shut down on 10 February 1976.

== History ==
=== Nike Zeus ===
An anti-ICBM defensive ABM system was first considered by the US Army in 1955 under the name Nike II. This was essentially an upgraded version of their Nike B surface-to-air missile (SAM) along with dramatically improved radars and computers able to detect the incoming reentry vehicles (RVs) and develop tracking information while still leaving enough time for the interceptor missile to climb to its altitude. Zeus had limited traffic handling capabilities, designed to deal with a small number of attacking missiles arriving over a period of as long as an hour. It was calculated that an attack of only four missiles arriving within one minute would allow one of the warheads to pass by while the system was busy attacking others, making it relatively easy to attack the Zeus base. However, in an era when ICBMs cost about the same as a strategic bomber, such an attack would cost an enormous amount.

Through the late 1950s a new generation of much lighter thermonuclear bombs cut warhead weight from 3,000 kilograms (6,600 lb) in the case of the original Soviet R-7 Semyorka ICBM to perhaps 1,000 kilograms (2,200 lb), and further reductions were known to be possible - the US's W47 of the UGM-27 Polaris weighed only 330 kilograms (730 lb). This meant that much smaller rockets could carry these new warheads to the same range, greatly reducing the cost of the missile, making them far cheaper than bombers or any other delivery system. When Nikita Khrushchev angrily boasted that the Soviet Union was producing new missiles "like sausages", the US responded by building more ICBMs of their own, rather than attempting to defend against them with Zeus. Adding to the problems, as the warhead weight dropped, existing missiles had leftover throw weight that could be used for various radar decoys, which Zeus proved unable to distinguish from the actual RV. The Army calculated that as many as twenty Zeus' would have to be fired to ensure a single incoming missile was destroyed.

=== Nike-X ===
Faced with these problems, both the Eisenhower and Kennedy administrations turned to the newly created ARPA to suggest solutions. ARPA noted that because the decoys were lighter than the actual warhead, they would slow down more rapidly as they reentered the lower atmosphere. They proposed a system using a short range missile that could wait until the warhead was below 100,000 feet (30 km) altitude, at which point the decoys would have been decluttered. Desiring to destroy the missile before it was below 20,000 feet (6.1 km) altitude, combined with the 5 miles (8.0 km) per second terminal speed of the RV meant there were only 2 to 3 seconds to develop a track and shoot the interceptor. This would demand extremely fast missiles, high-performance radars and advanced computers.

In 1963, Robert McNamara cancelled the upcoming deployment of Zeus and announced that money would instead be provided for research into this new system, now known as Nike-X. Construction on the new phased array radar and its associated computer systems began at the MAR-I site in White Sands Missile Range. MAR could track hundreds of warheads and the interceptor missiles sent to attack them, meaning the Soviets would have to launch hundreds of missiles if they wanted to overwhelm it. And now that decoys were no longer an issue, the cost-exchange ratio fell back to reasonable levels.

The Nike-X developed the same sort of trouble as the Zeus before it. In this case it was ironically due to the Soviet's own ABM system which was very similar to Zeus. To ensure they could defeat it, the US Air Force began equipping their own ICBMs with decoys, which would defeat the Soviet's Zeus-like system. However, concerned that the Soviets would upgrade their system to Nike-X like performance, they instead began replacing their warheads with lighter ones, and carrying three of them. This meant that every US missile would require three (or six accounting for redundancy) interceptors.

When the same calculations were run for Nike-X, it was calculated that they would have to deploy 7,000 Sprint missiles, and the cost-exchange ratio was 20-to-1 in favor of the Soviets. When presented with these numbers, McNamara concluded that deploying Nike-X would prompt to Soviets to build more ICBMs, increasing the risk of an accidental war. From this point on, he opposed building a "heavy" ABM system like Nike-X.

=== Sentinel ===
In spite of all of these problems, which McNamara repeatedly made public in a series of talks, the Johnson administration was under intense pressure to deploy an ABM system. In 1966 Congress voted to provide deployment funding for Nike-X, although McNamara refused to use it. As the 1967 elections approached, it became clear that this was going to be a major election issue. McNamara proposed arms limitations talks with the Soviets to put upper limits on the numbers of ABMs and warheads, but the Glassboro Summit Conference ultimately came to nothing.

By late 1967 it was clear the Soviets were not seriously considering limitations, and were continuing deployment of their own ABM system. In September, the Chinese tested their first H-bomb. McNamara and Johnson seized on this as a solution to the problem; a defense against the tiny Chinese fleet was both technically possible and relatively low-cost. Deploying this system would mute the ongoing debate, even over the long term if the option was open to expand the system to Nike-X coverage levels in the future. On 18 September 1967, McNamara announced the Sentinel program, with 17 bases covering all of the US, along with a total of just under 700 missiles, about 1/10 the number in a baseline Nike-X.

Nixon, having campaigned that the Democrats were deliberately dragging their feet on the ABM, inherited the system with his election win. He also inherited a massive NIMBY backlash that blew up in late 1968 when the Army chose to deploy the missiles in suburban locations to allow future expansion to be easier. City-dwellers could tolerate the idea of an armed rocket attack against bombers going on over their heads. They were less comfortable with the concept of nuclear anti-missiles detonating against incoming missiles at low altitudes.

The issue came to a head at a meeting outside Boston, when an estimated 1,000 to 2,000 people showed up to express their displeasure in spite of a raging blizzard. Congressmen were flooded by letters from constituents demanding the sites be moved, and Congress was soon threatening to freeze all additional funds for the system. Nixon announced construction would be delayed while the system underwent a review.

=== Safeguard ===
The review was completed on 14 March 1969 and announced in a lengthy speech made by Nixon and various DoD advisers. The entire concept had been reviewed and all possibilities considered fresh. Among these, the idea of a heavyweight Nike-X-like system was considered, but Defense Secretary Melvin Laird came to the same conclusion as McNamara before him, stating that the protection the system offered simply didn't justify the cost;

When you are looking toward city defense, it needs to be a perfect or near perfect system because, as I examined the possibility of even a thick defense of cities, I have found that even the most optimistic projections, considering the highest development of the art, would mean that we would still lose 30 million to 40 million lives...

However, they disagreed with the concept of a light city defense as well. There was no reason to deploy a system that only worked under contrived circumstances, especially as accepting them as possibilities meant that the enemy was ignoring your deterrent. If that was the case, why have missiles at all? The real issue becomes ensuring they cannot ignore your deterrent, and it was this concept that Nixon chose. Instead of deploying the ABM system to protect cities, the new deployment would protect the missile bases themselves, ensuring that no limited attack could be contemplated. This did not have to be perfect, or even close to it;

When you are talking about protecting your deterrent, it need not be perfect. It is necessary only to protect enough of the deterrent that the retaliatory second strike will be of such magnitude that the enemy would think twice about launching a first strike.

In keeping with this concept, he announced that the Sentinel system would be modified to focus on defending the missile silos. He stated that the new system was intended to be:

...a safeguard against any attack by the Chinese Communists that we can foresee over the next 10 years. It is a safeguard of our deterrent system, which is increasingly vulnerable due to the advances that have been made by the Soviet Union since the year 1967 when the Sentinel program was first laid out. It is a safeguard also against any irrational or accidental attack that might occur of less than the massive magnitude which might be launched from the Soviet Union.

Following Nixon's example, when the system was announced by the press, the Army began referring to it as Safeguard, and the Army officially changed the name on 25 March.

=== Growing system ===
On 30 January 1970, Nixon held a press conference and was asked about ABM developments, suggesting that he wanted a more complete system than the two-site one being considered, replying that he had "decided to go forward with both the first phase and the second phase of the ABM system." The next month, on 20 February during appropriations meetings for fiscal year 1971, Laird asked for additional funding for a third base at Whiteman Air Force Base in Missouri, as well as additional Sprint missiles at the two previously selected bases, Grand Forks AFB, North Dakota, and Malmstrom AFB, Montana. A statement released by the Deputy Secretary of Defense, David Packard, asked for another $1.6 billion to build out an entire system of 12 bases.

These changes were taking place while the State Department was involved in negotiations with their Soviet counterparts on sweeping arms limitations talks, which would become SALT. On 10 March, the Secretary of the Air Force Robert Seamans announced that they had tested a Minuteman III missile with multiple independently targetable reentry vehicle (MIRV), which was a surprised to many as it had been suggested the US stop work on these designs while the talks were being set up. As a result, the Safeguard expansion and MIRV testing ran into significant protest in the government. On 8 April, Herbert York, formerly the director of ARPA, stated that the continued development of these systems would "create a disequilibrium" that would negatively effect the talks, and that the USSR would rush their own ABM system to counter US efforts, questioning their ability to "invent and institute adequate control to prevent human and mechanical failures" which might result in nuclear accidents.

Despite considerable arguing, on 24 April the House Armed Services Committee agreed to a budget that included $1.02 billion for construction at Whiteman, advance site work at Warren Air Force Base in Wyoming, and preliminary work at four other sites, including one for Washington, DC. This general outline passed several follow-up votes, but on 17 June the Senate Armed Services Committee cut back the budget for the four additional sites.

== Operation ==
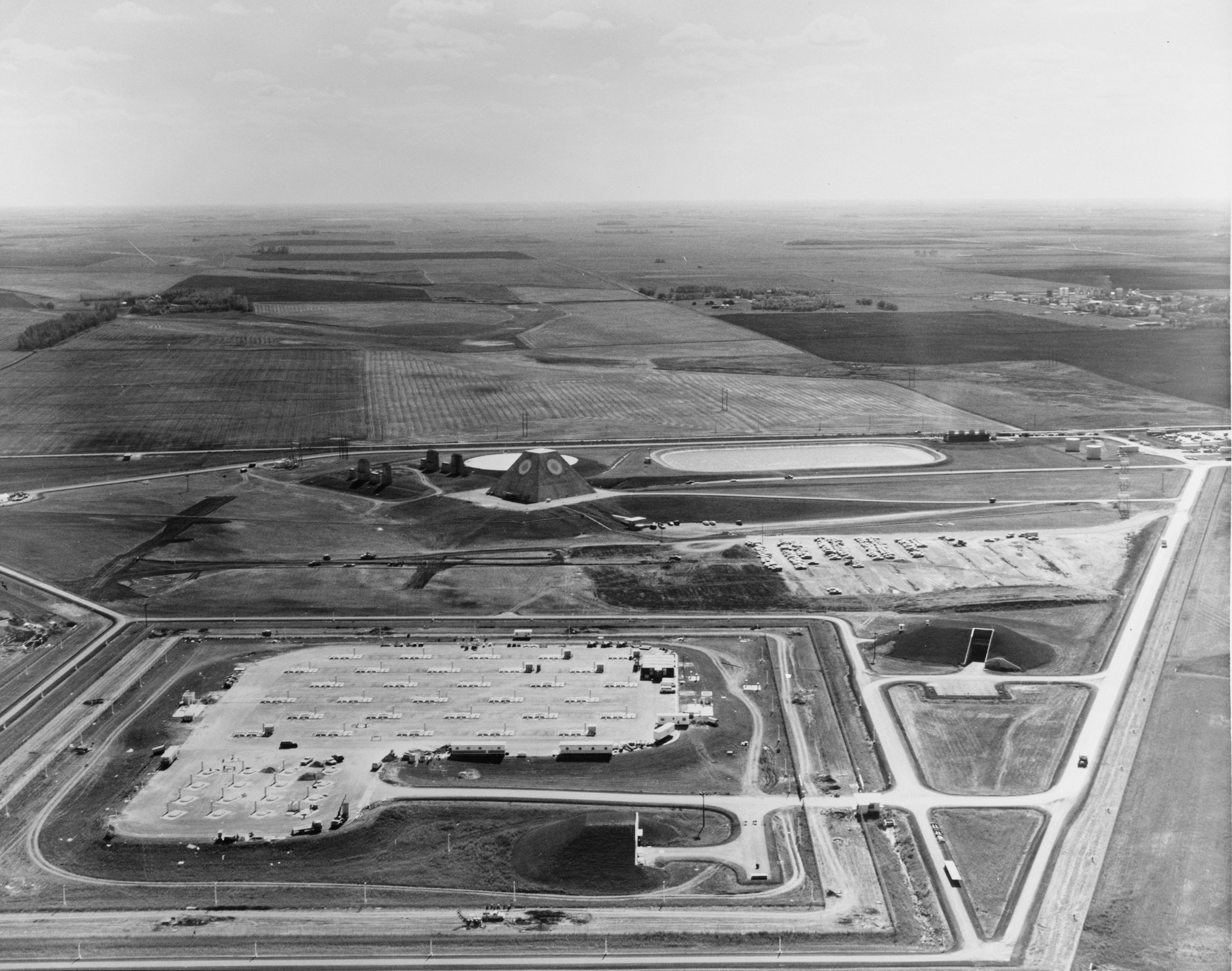
An aerial image of the Stanley R. Mickelsen Safeguard Complex

Safeguard was a two-layer defense system. The long-range Spartan missile would attempt interception outside the Earth's atmosphere. The missile's long range allowed protection of a large geographic area. If the Spartan failed to intercept the incoming offensive missile, the high performance and high speed but short ranged Sprint missile would attempt an interception within the atmosphere. Both missiles used nuclear warheads, and they relied on destroying or damaging the incoming warhead with radiation rather than heat or blast. The Spartan carried a weapon with a 5 megatons of TNT (21 PJ) yield; the Sprint in the 1 kiloton of TNT (4.2 TJ) range.

The envisioned sequence was as follows:

1. Enemy launch detected by Defense Support Program satellites, sensing the hot infrared exhaust of the ICBM booster.
2. While in the mid-course phase, the Ballistic Missile Early Warning System radars in the far north would detect the incoming warheads.
3. As the warheads approached (but while still in outer space) the Safeguard long-range Perimeter Acquisition Radar (PAR) would detect them, providing filtered information to the shorter-range and more precise Missile Site Radar (MSR).
4. While the incoming warhead came within range of the MSR, the associated computer systems would calculate intercept trajectories and launch times.

== Original deployment plan ==
Plans were made in the late 1960s to deploy Safeguard systems in three locations, Whiteman AFB, Missouri, Malmstrom AFB, Montana, and Grand Forks AFB, North Dakota, to protect important strategic weapons assets. However the Whiteman AFB location was canceled despite the fact that specific missile and radar site locations had already been selected. Construction was actually commenced at the North Dakota and Montana sites, but only the North Dakota site was completed. Remnants of the incomplete PAR system still remain in rural Montana.

== Components ==
The Safeguard system consisted of several primary components, the Perimeter Acquisition Radar, the Missile Site Radar, the Spartan missile launchers, co-located Sprint missile launchers, and Remote Sprint missile launchers.

=== Perimeter Acquisition Radar (PAR) ===
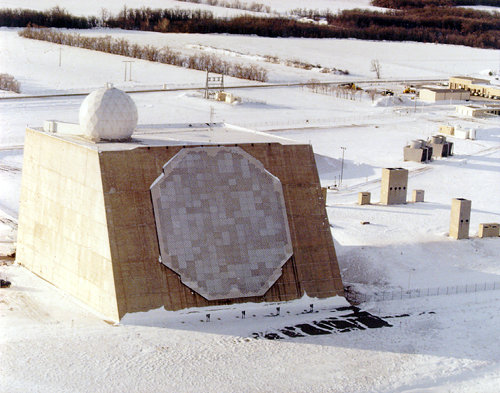
The PAR, known now as PARCS (for Perimeter Acquisition Radar Cueing System) is still operational

The PAR was a large passive electronically scanned array radar that was intended to detect incoming ballistic missile warheads as they crossed over the North Pole region. Potential targets detected by the PAR would be sent to the Missile Site Radar (MSR) and to North American Aerospace Defense Command. Two radar sites were intended to be constructed on the northern border of the United States, one in Montana and one in North Dakota. Construction was begun at both locations, but because of the ratification of the Anti-Ballistic Missile Treaty, only the site at North Dakota was completed. That site, near Cavalier, North Dakota, is now operated by the United States Space Force as Cavalier Space Force Station.

Remnants of the Montana PAR site are located east of Conrad, Montana, at 48°17′15.83″N 111°20′32.39″W.

=== Missile Site Radar (MSR) ===
The Missile Site Radar was the control of the Safeguard system. It housed the computers and a phased array radar necessary to track and hit back at incoming ICBM warheads. The radar building itself is a pyramid structure several stories tall. Construction was begun in both Montana and North Dakota, but only the North Dakota site remains standing. The MSR complex included 30 Spartan missile launchers and 16 Sprint missile launchers.

Remnants of the Montana MSR site 48.13831°N 111.76152°W were dismantled and buried.

=== Remote Sprint Launchers (RSL) ===
Remote Sprint Launchers were established around the MSR main complex in order to place missile launchers closer to their intended targets, and thus reduce the flight range to the targets. Four sites were completed, and they still remain there, 10 to 20 miles (16 to 32 km) around the MSR complex in Nekoma, North Dakota.

- RSL-1 48.53335°N 98.58304°W
- RSL-2 48.84943°N 98.43217°W
- RSL-3 48.76455°N 97.98602°W on the National Register of Historic Places, museum
- RSL-4 48.47525°N 98.25612°W

== Photo gallery ==
In May 1969, the US Army Institute of Heraldry approved this shoulder sleeve insignia for Safeguard.

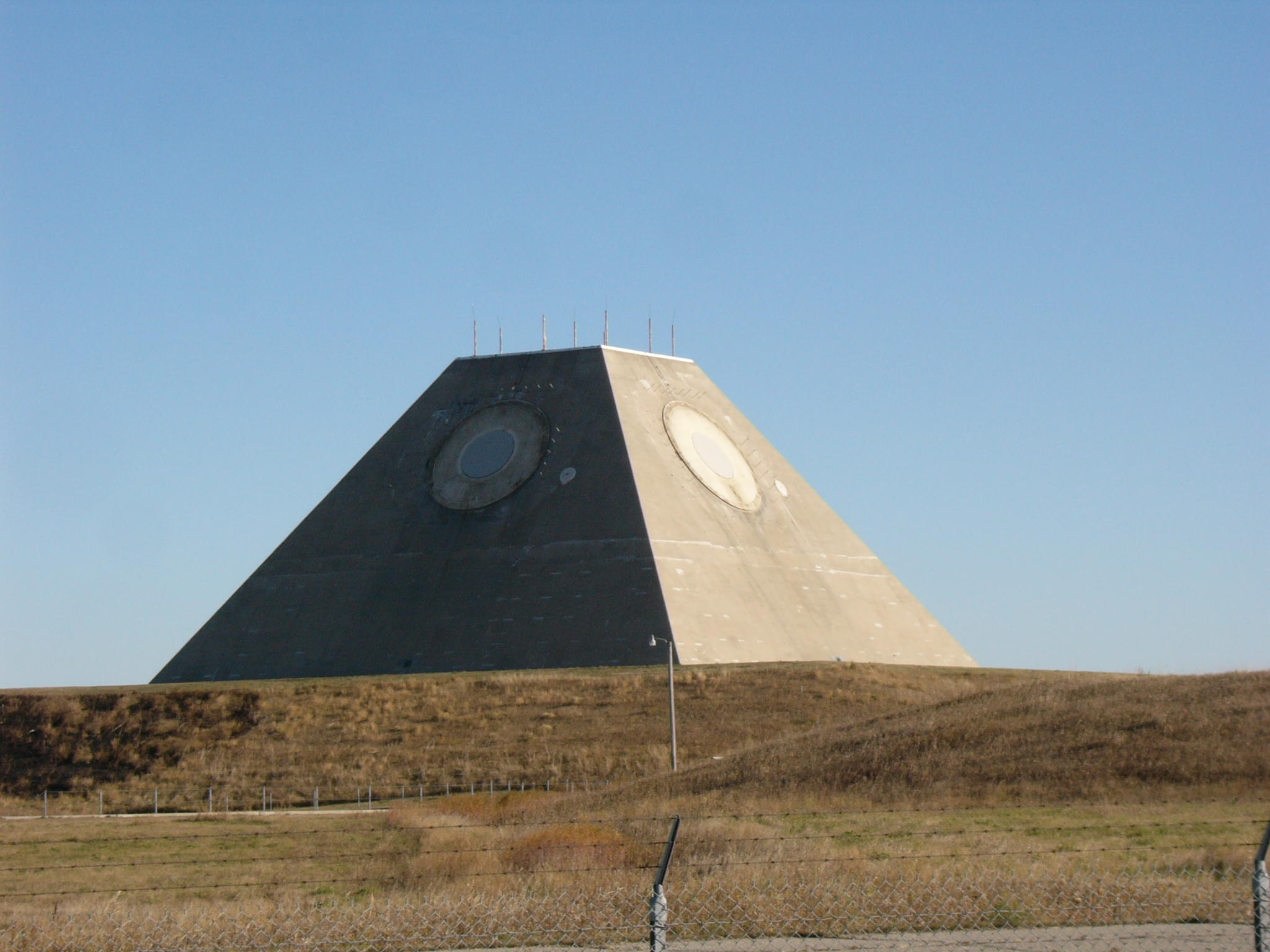
Safeguard Missile Site Radar

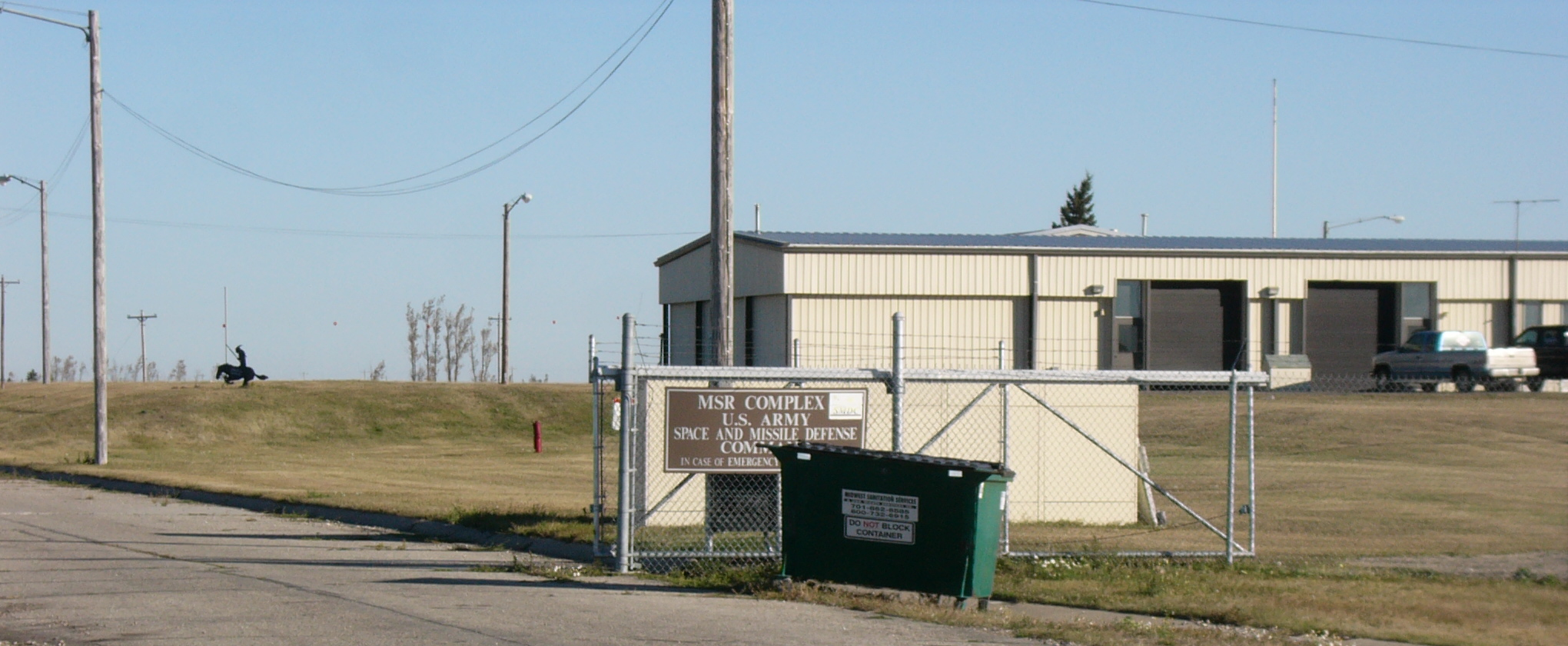
Missile Site Radar Complex sign

The Missile Site Radar overlooks missile launchers at the Stanley R. Mickelsen Safeguard complex in Nekoma, North Dakota.

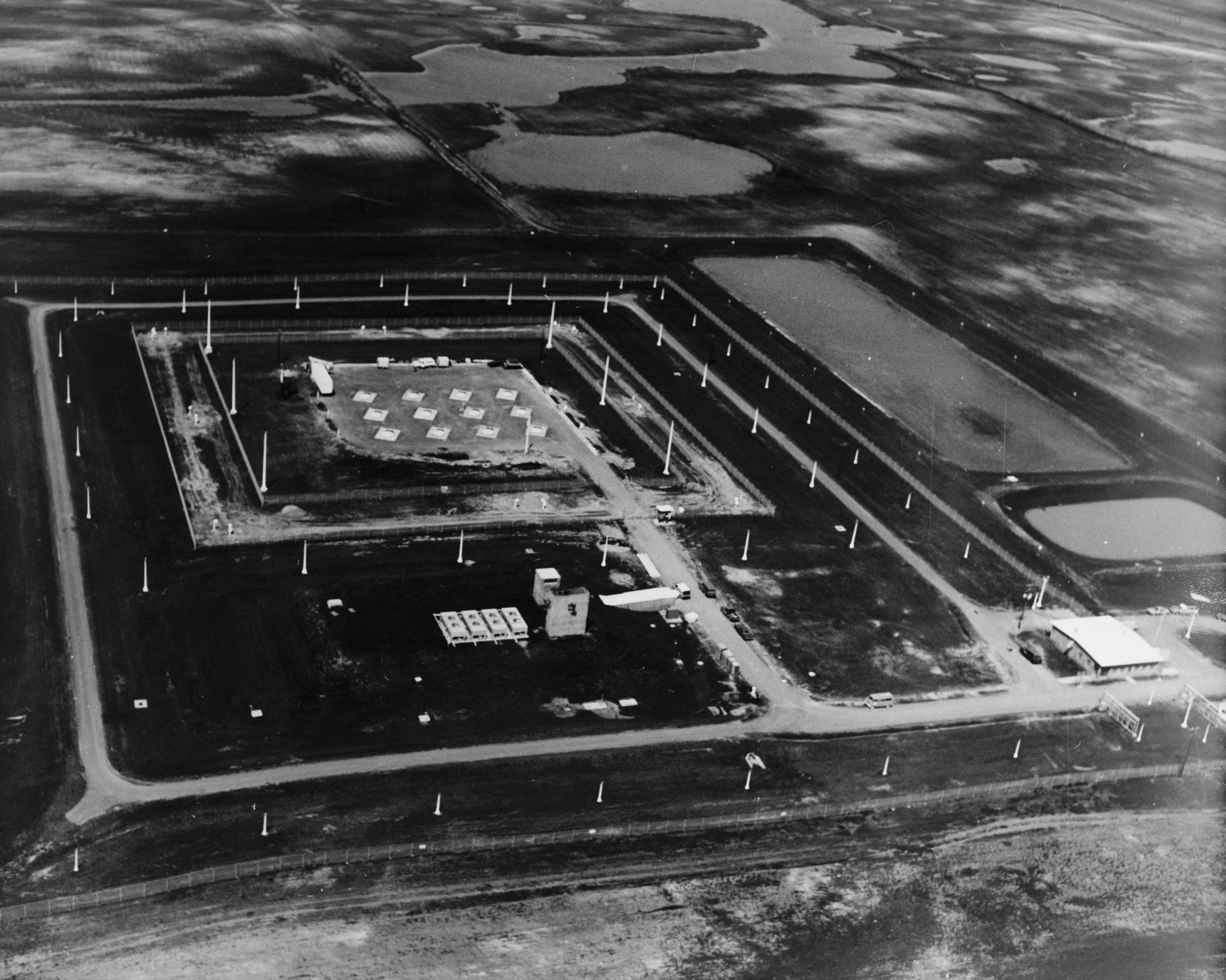
Aerial image of Remote Sprint Launch Site No. 2.

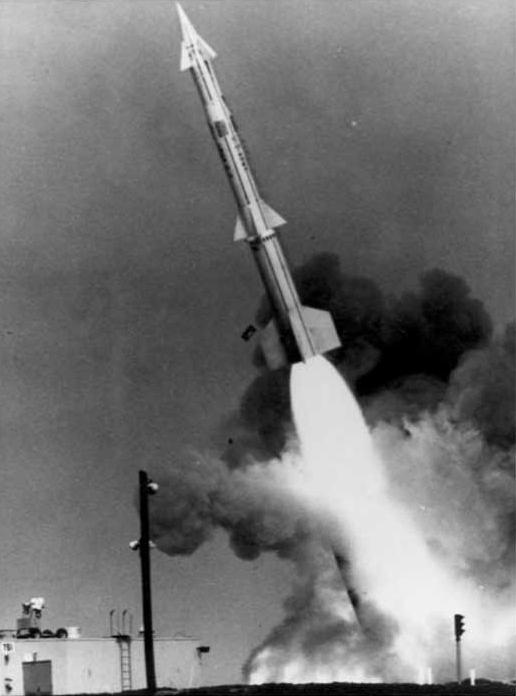
The LIM-49 Spartan missile was intended to intercept warheads above the earth's atmosphere

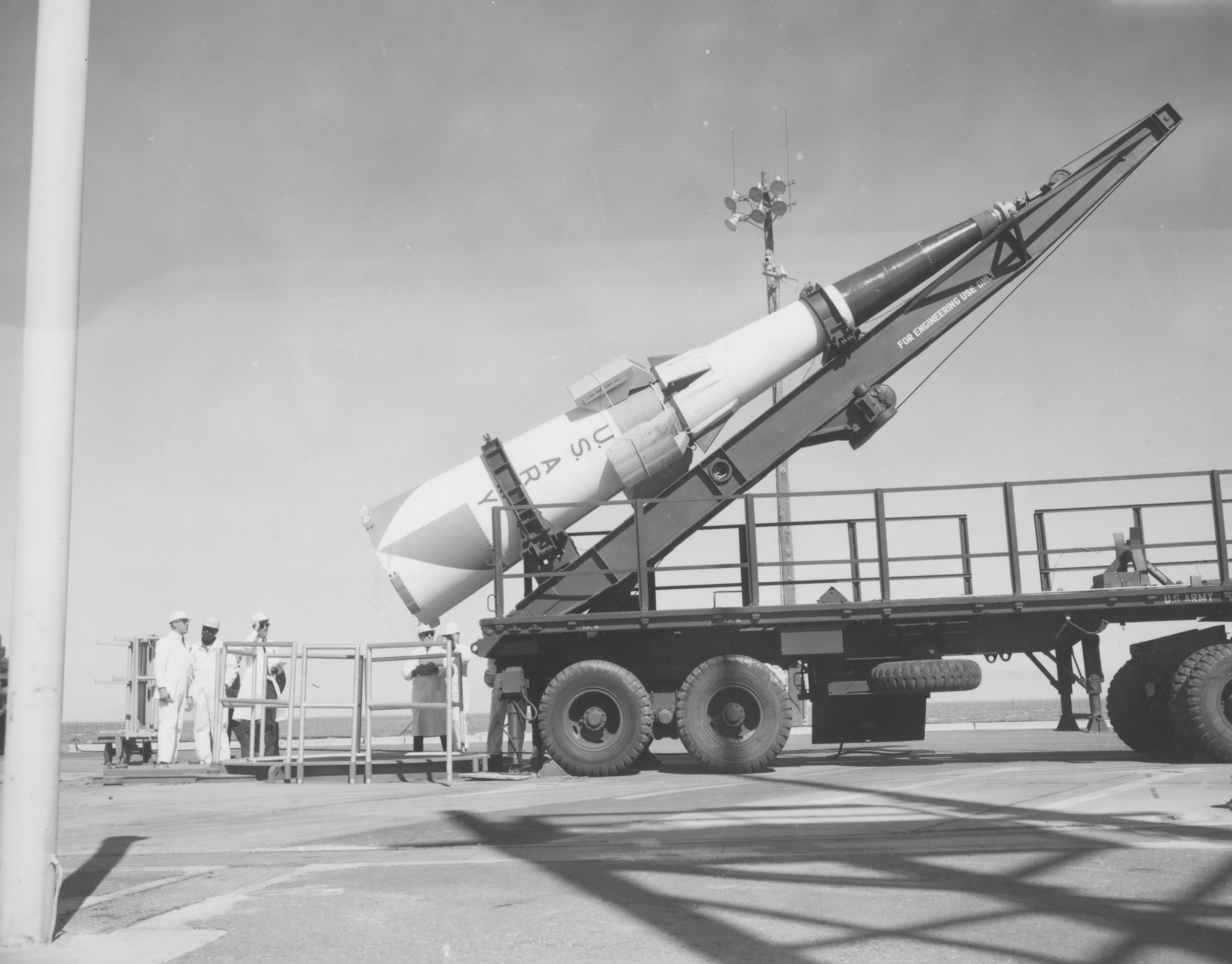
A Sprint missile being loaded for test firing at White Sands Missile Range, 1967.

== See also ==
- Sharpner's Pond Anti-Ballistic Missile Site, an incomplete radar for the Sentinel program
- Strategic Defense Initiative (SDI), successor to Safeguard
- Comparison of anti-ballistic missile systems
