= Stanley R. Mickelsen Safeguard Complex =

Former military facilities in North Dakota, U.S.

- Near Langdon, North Dakota in United States
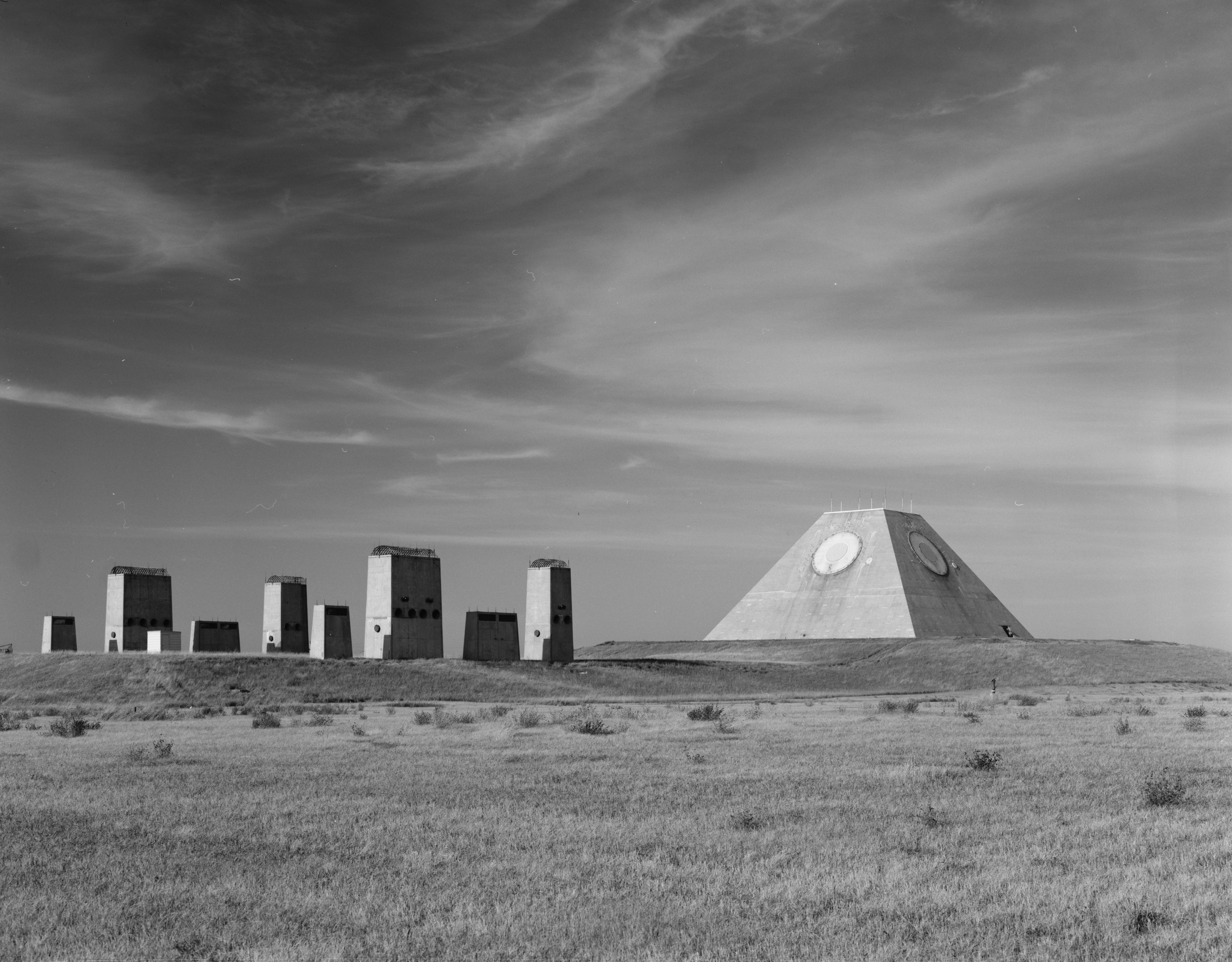
- Safeguard Complex Missile Site Radar

Location
- Coordinates: 48°35′21.91″N 98°21′24.26″W

Site history
- Built: October 1975
- In use: April 1976
- Fate: Decommissioned

The Stanley R. Mickelsen Safeguard Complex (SRMSC) was a cluster of military facilities near Nekoma, North Dakota, that supported the United States Army's Safeguard anti-ballistic missile program. The complex provided launch and control for 30 LIM-49 Spartan anti-ballistic missiles, and 70 shorter-range Sprint anti-ballistic missiles.

The deployment area of the complex covered the Minuteman launchers of the 321st Strategic Missile Wing, based at Grand Forks Air Force Base, North Dakota. Under the terms in the 1972 Anti-Ballistic Missile Treaty, the US was permitted to deploy a single ABM system protecting an area containing ICBM launchers. The total of 100 launchers and 100 missiles was the maximum permitted under the treaty.

The site achieved initial operating capability on 1 April 1975, and full operational capability on 1 October 1975 costing $6 billion (equivalent to $35.9 billion in 2025). However, on 2 October 1975, the House of Representatives voted to decommission the project, after they deemed it ineffective. The complex was deactivated in April 1976, after only six months of full operational capacity. In December 2012, it was purchased by the Spring Creek Hutterite Colony of Forbes, North Dakota, at auction for $530,000 (equivalent to $743,260 in 2025). In 2020, portions of the property including the Pyramid were sold to the Cavalier County Job Development Authority (CCJDA) for $462,900. The CCJDA intends to build an interpretive historical center, restore the property, and sell or lease the pyramid to a datacenter or similar business. In July 2022, data center developer Bitzero Blockchain Inc. acquired the pyramid from the CCJDA to restore and renovate the complex and convert it into a data center, with a slated $500 million going into the project. Bitzero also plans to create an interpretive center for the complex. The Hutterite colony retains ownership of the remaining property.

The site was named for Stanley R. Mickelsen, a former commanding general of the U.S. Army Air Defense Command.

== Facilities ==
The complex was centered on the Missile Site Radar (MSR) site, near Nekoma, North Dakota, home of the Missile Site Radar, and 30 Spartan missiles and 16 shorter-range Sprints. All missiles were held in underground launch silos.

The remaining Sprint missiles were distributed at four Remote Sprint Launchers at distances of 10 to 20 miles (16 to 32 km) from the Missile Site Radar. These were located at:

RSL 1 48°32′00.24″N 98°34′58.81″W
RSL 2 48°50′58.03″N 98°25′55.84″W
RSL 3 48°45′52.63″N 97°59′9.92″W
RSL 4 48°28′30.91″N 98°15′23.02″W

The Perimeter Acquisition Radar (PAR) was a separately sited phased array radar to detect incoming targets. The radar and site are currently in service as the Perimeter Acquisition Radar Characterization System (PARCS), located at Cavalier Air Force Station.

The MSR and PSR sites are listed in the Historic American Engineering Record, a Heritage Documentation Program.

== Images gallery ==
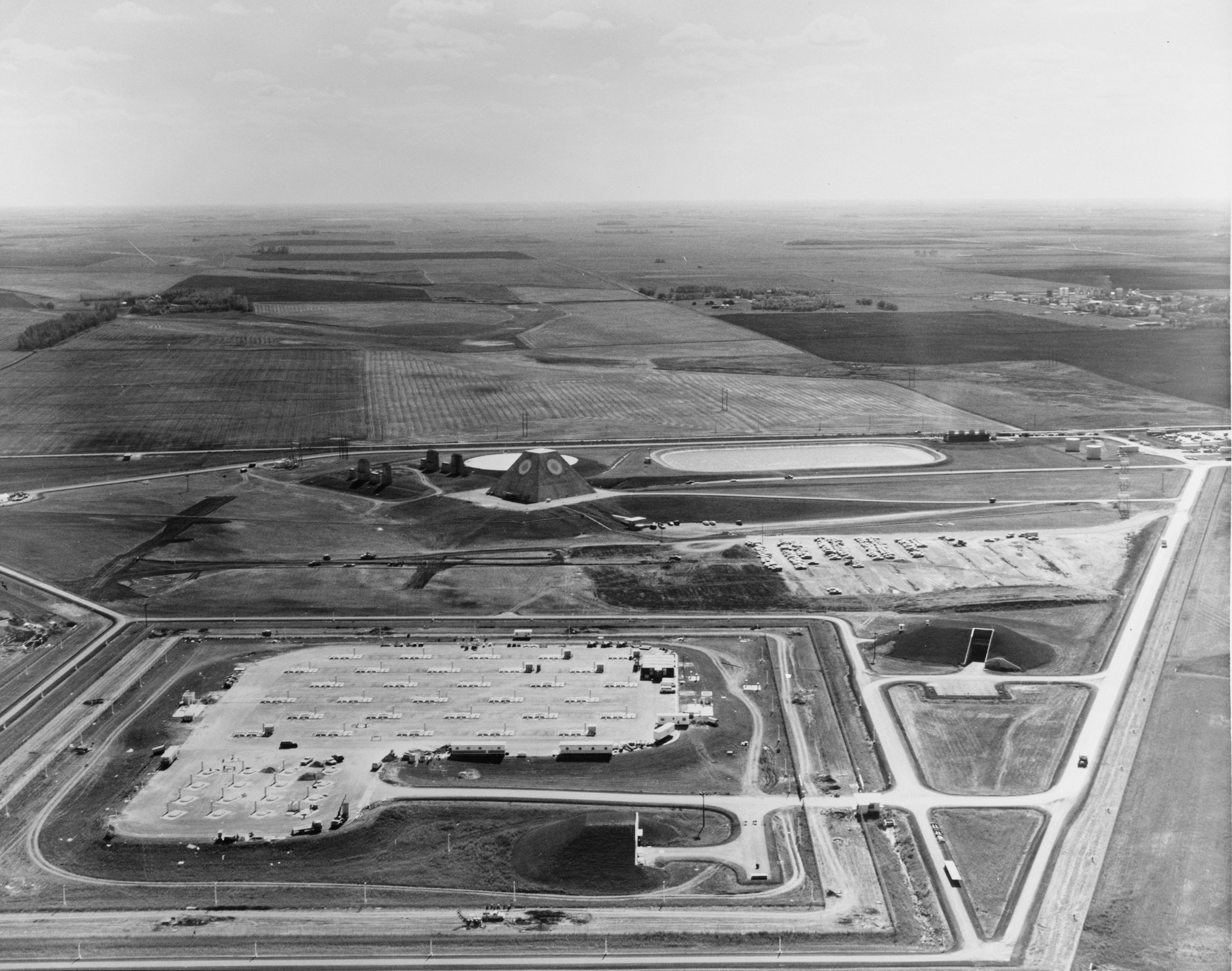
Aerial image of the MSR site

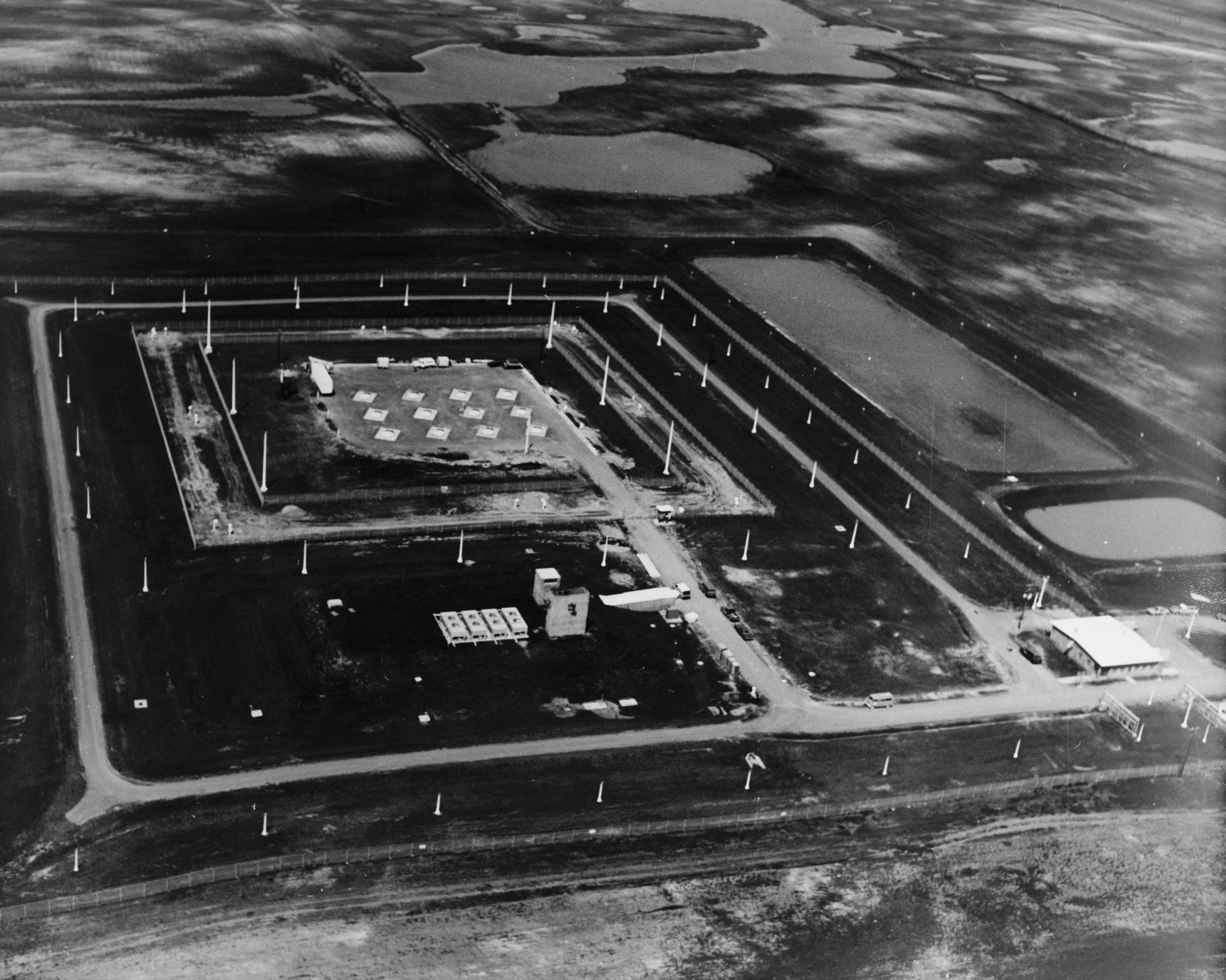
Aerial image of Remote Sprint Launch Site No. 2.

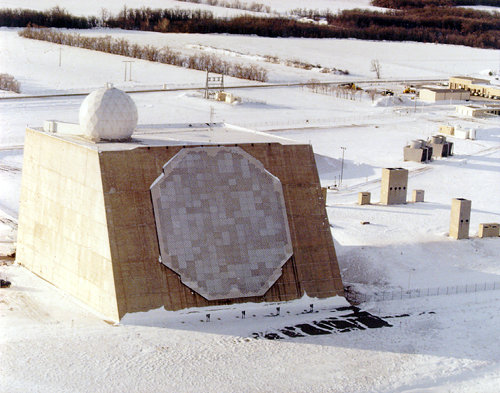
The PAR, now known as EPARCS, is still in operation

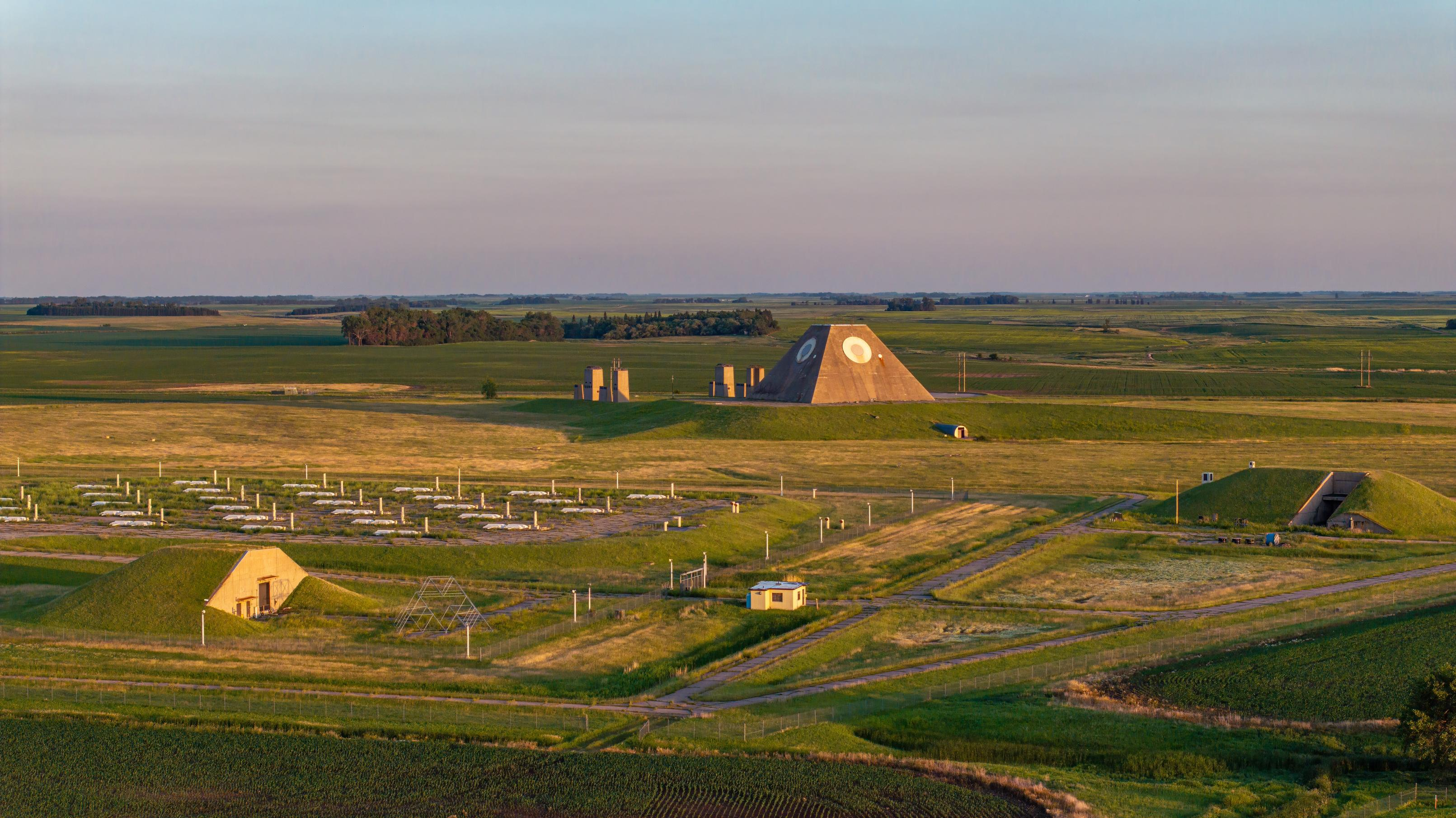
Safeguard MSR pyramid and Spartan missile silos in July 2025

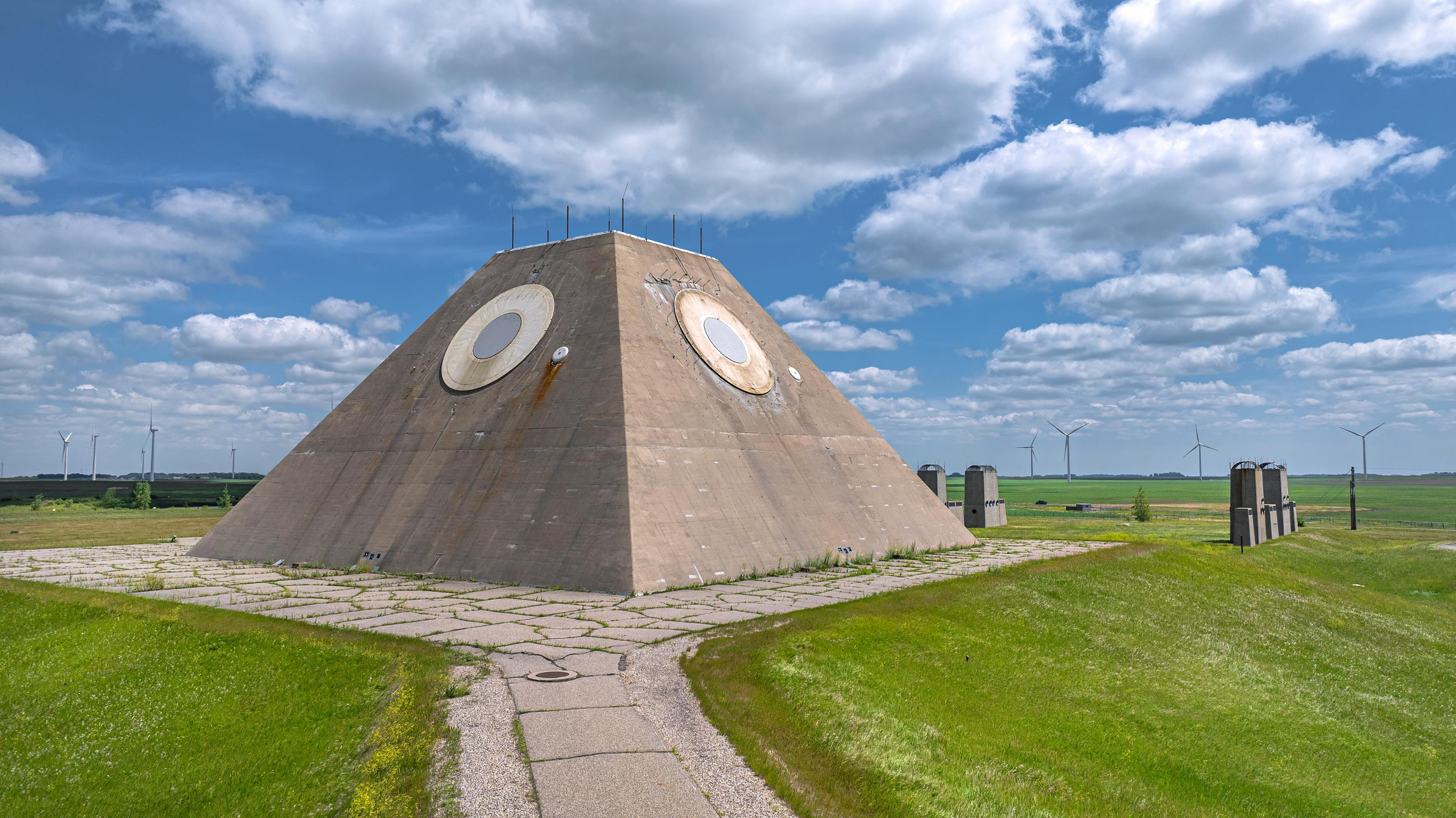
Safeguard MSR Pyramid in July 2025

== See also ==
- Early-warning radar
