= Stanley R. Mickelsen =

United States Army general (1895–1966)

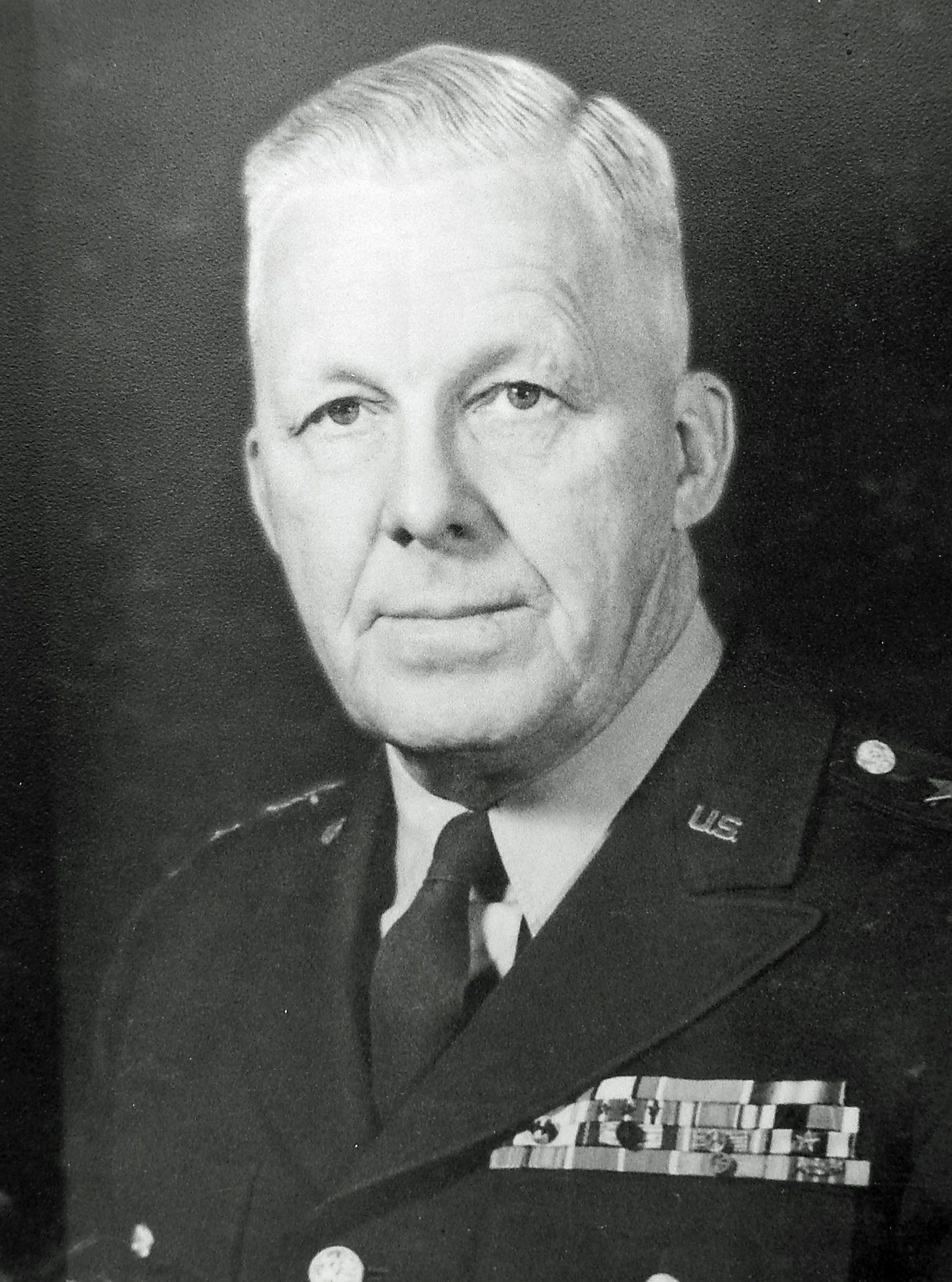
- LTG Stanley R. Mickelsen - U.S. Army official photograph from the 1950s
- Born: 8 October 1895
- Died: 28 March 1966 (aged 70)
- Burial place: Arlington National Cemetery, Virginia, United States
- Relatives: John Q. Henion (son-in-law)
- Military career
- Allegiance: United States
- Branch: United States Army
- Service years: 1917–1957
- Rank: Lieutenant General
- Unit: Coast Artillery Corps
- Commands: Army Air Defense Command
- Conflicts: World War I; World War II
- Awards: Army Distinguished Service Medal; Legion of Merit

Stanley Raymond Mickelsen (8 October 1895 – 28 March 1966) was an American military leader. Born in Minnesota, and a graduate of the University of Minnesota, Mickelsen joined the Army in 1917.

== Military career ==
Mickelsen began his career as a second lieutenant in the Coast Artillery Corps Reserve in August 1917. Within two months, he received a Regular Army commission and an assignment to the Antiaircraft Artillery Board at Fort Monroe, Virginia, followed by assignments with antiaircraft units in Panama.

After serving as an instructor with the Connecticut Army National Guard, Mickelsen returned to school. He graduated from the Coast Artillery School in 1928 and remained there as an instructor for several years. Following a tour with the 59th Coast Artillery Regiment at Fort Mills in the Philippine Islands, Mickelsen graduated from the Command and General Staff School in 1936 and the Army War College in 1938.

With the approach of World War II, in October 1941, Mickelsen assumed command of the 74th Coast Artillery (Antiaircraft) Regiment at Camp Pendleton, Virginia. In March 1942, he transferred to Camp Davis, North Carolina, where he assumed command of the 47th Antiaircraft Artillery Brigade. The brigade was shipped to Iceland in April 1943. In November 1943, Mickelsen was appointed commander of the Artillery Training Center at Fort Bliss, Texas. Within the year, he was assigned to Supreme Headquarters Allied Expeditionary Forces in Europe, where he served as Chief, Displaced Persons Branch. He remained in Europe as the Assistant Chief of Staff for Military Government (1945-1947) and later as the Director, Civil Affairs Division at European Command (1947).

In 1947, Mickelsen returned to the United States to serve as the Assistant Commandant, Artillery School at Fort Sill, Oklahoma. Two years later, he was appointed Chief, Guided Missiles Group at Army Headquarters. With the 1950 reorganization of Army Headquarters, this position was redesignated as the Deputy Chief of Staff for Operations (Guided Missiles). In January 1951, while retaining responsibility for guided missiles, Mickelsen became the Deputy for Special Weapons to the Assistant Chief of Staff for Logistics. He remained dual hatted in this assignment

In July 1952, Mickelsen was assigned as the Commandant, Antiaircraft and Guided Missile Center at Fort Bliss with the additional duty of Assistant Commandant, Artillery School. In 1954, he was assigned as Commanding General, Antiaircraft Command (the predecessor unit of Army Air Defense Command), at Ent Air Force Base, Colorado.

Mickelsen retired from active duty on October 31, 1957.

Helen Jean Mickelsen, the daughter of Stanley Mickelsen, was the wife of Lieutenant General John Q. Henion.

== Military Awards and Decorations ==

1st Row	Army Distinguished Service Medal with Oak Leaf Cluster	Legion of Merit	World War I Victory Medal	American Defense Service Medal
2nd Row	American Campaign Medal	European-African-Middle Eastern Campaign Medal with three bronze service stars	World War II Victory Medal	Army of Occupation Medal with Germany Clasp
3rd Row	National Defense Service Medal	Officer of the Order of Orange Nassau (The Netherlands)	Commander of the Order of Leopold II (Belgium)	Commander of the Order of Ouissam Alaouite (Morocco)
4th Row	Order of the Red Banner (Union of Soviet Socialist Republics)	Honorary Commander of the Most Excellent Order of the British Empire	Officer of the Legion of Honor (France)	Croix de guerre 1939-1945 with palm (France)

== Legacy ==
- Stanley R. Mickelsen Safeguard Complex
