= Nekoma, North Dakota =

Nekoma
- City
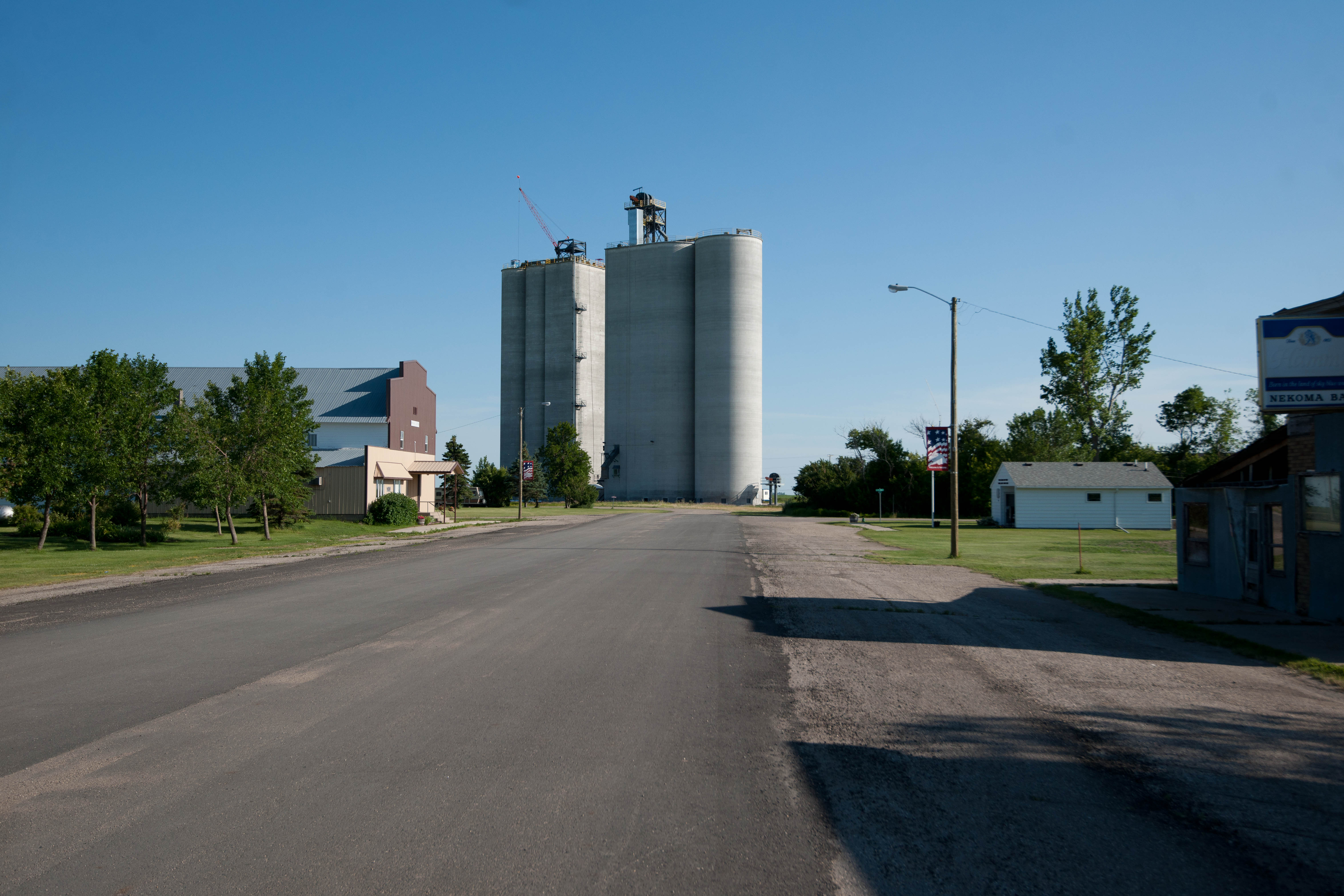
- Grain Elevator in Nekoma

- Location of Nekoma, North Dakota
- Coordinates: 48°34′35″N 98°22′16″W
- Country: United States
- State: North Dakota
- County: Cavalier
- Founded: 1905

Area
  - Total: 0.37 sq mi (0.97 km^{2})
  - Land: 0.37 sq mi (0.96 km^{2})
  - Water: 0 sq mi (0.00 km^{2})
- Elevation: 1,621 ft (494 m)

Population (2020)
  - Total: 31
  - Estimate (2022): 30
  - Density: 83.4/sq mi (32.19/km^{2})
- Time zone: UTC–6 (Central (CST))
  - Summer (DST): UTC–5 (CDT)
- ZIP Code: 58355
- Area code: 701
- FIPS code: 38-55740
- GNIS feature ID: 1036177

Nekoma is a city in Cavalier County, North Dakota, United States. The population was 31 at the 2020 census.

== Geography ==
According to the United States Census Bureau, the city has a total area of 0.36 square miles (0.93 km^{2}), all land.

== Demographics ==
Historical population
Census	Pop.	Note	%±
1910	120		—
1920	189		57.5%
1930	191		1.1%
1940	184		−3.7%
1950	140		−23.9%
1960	143		2.1%
1970	84		−41.3%
1980	102		21.4%
1990	63		−38.2%
2000	51		−19.0%
2010	50		−2.0%
2020	31		−38.0%
2022 (est.)	30		−3.2%
U.S. Decennial Census; 2020 Census

=== 2010 census ===
As of the census of 2010, there were 50 people, 21 households, and 15 families residing in the city. The population density was 138.9 inhabitants per square mile (53.6/km^{2}). There were 36 housing units at an average density of 100.0 per square mile (38.6/km^{2}). The racial makeup of the city was 100.0% White.

There were 21 households, of which 19.0% had children under the age of 18 living with them, 57.1% were married couples living together, 4.8% had a female householder with no husband present, 9.5% had a male householder with no wife present, and 28.6% were non-families. 28.6% of all households were made up of individuals, and 9.6% had someone living alone who was 65 years of age or older. The average household size was 2.38 and the average family size was 2.93.

The median age in the city was 54 years. 22% of residents were under the age of 18; 2% were between the ages of 18 and 24; 12% were from 25 to 44; 50% were from 45 to 64; and 14% were 65 years of age or older. The gender makeup of the city was 58.0% male and 42.0% female.

=== 2000 census ===
As of the census of 2000, there were 51 people, 21 households, and 12 families residing in the city. The population density was 136.7 inhabitants per square mile (52.8/km^{2}). There were 41 housing units at an average density of 109.9 per square mile (42.4/km^{2}). The racial makeup of the city was 98.04% White, and 1.96% from two or more races.

There were 21 households, out of which 38.1% had children under the age of 18 living with them, 52.4% were married couples living together, and 38.1% were non-families. 38.1% of all households were made up of individuals, and 23.8% had someone living alone who was 65 years of age or older. The average household size was 2.43 and the average family size was 3.31.

In the city, the population was spread out, with 29.4% under the age of 18, 3.9% from 18 to 24, 23.5% from 25 to 44, 29.4% from 45 to 64, and 13.7% who were 65 years of age or older. The median age was 44 years. For every 100 females, there were 112.5 males. For every 100 females age 18 and over, there were 125.0 males.

The median income for a household in the city was $27,188, and the median income for a family was $34,375. Males had a median income of $28,750 versus $11,250 for females. The per capita income for the city was $13,330. There were no families and 5.4% of the population living below the poverty line, including no under eighteens and 22.2% of those over 64.
