= Harrison Township =

Harrison Township may refer to:

== Arkansas ==
- Harrison Township, Hot Spring County, Arkansas, in Hot Spring County, Arkansas
- Harrison Township, Union County, Arkansas, in Union County, Arkansas
- Harrison Township, White County, Arkansas, in White County, Arkansas

== Illinois ==
- Harrison Township, Winnebago County, Illinois

== Indiana ==
- Harrison Township, Bartholomew County, Indiana
- Harrison Township, Blackford County, Indiana
- Harrison Township, Boone County, Indiana
- Harrison Township, Cass County, Indiana
- Harrison Township, Clay County, Indiana
- Harrison Township, Daviess County, Indiana
- Harrison Township, Dearborn County, Indiana
- Harrison Township, Delaware County, Indiana
- Harrison Township, Elkhart County, Indiana
- Harrison Township, Fayette County, Indiana
- Harrison Township, Harrison County, Indiana
- Harrison Township, Henry County, Indiana
- Harrison Township, Howard County, Indiana
- Harrison Township, Knox County, Indiana
- Harrison Township, Kosciusko County, Indiana
- Harrison Township, Miami County, Indiana
- Harrison Township, Morgan County, Indiana
- Harrison Township, Owen County, Indiana
- Harrison Township, Pulaski County, Indiana
- Harrison Township, Spencer County, Indiana
- Harrison Township, Union County, Indiana
- Harrison Township, Vigo County, Indiana
- Harrison Township, Wayne County, Indiana
- Harrison Township, Wells County, Indiana

== Iowa ==
- Harrison Township, Adair County, Iowa
- Harrison Township, Benton County, Iowa
- Harrison Township, Boone County, Iowa
- Harrison Township, Harrison County, Iowa
- Harrison Township, Kossuth County, Iowa
- Harrison Township, Lee County, Iowa
- Harrison Township, Mahaska County, Iowa
- Harrison Township, Osceola County, Iowa

== Kansas ==
- Harrison Township, Chautauqua County, Kansas
- Harrison Township, Franklin County, Kansas
- Harrison Township, Greeley County, Kansas
- Harrison Township, Jewell County, Kansas
- Harrison Township, Nemaha County, Kansas, in Nemaha County, Kansas
- Harrison Township, Rice County, Kansas, in Rice County, Kansas
- Harrison Township, Wallace County, Kansas, in Wallace County, Kansas

== Michigan ==
- Harrison Township, Michigan

== Minnesota ==
- Harrison Township, Minnesota

== Missouri ==
- Harrison Township, Daviess County, Missouri
- Harrison Township, Grundy County, Missouri
- Harrison Township, Mercer County, Missouri
- Harrison Township, Moniteau County, Missouri
- Harrison Township, Scotland County, Missouri
- Harrison Township, Vernon County, Missouri

== Nebraska ==
- Harrison Township, Buffalo County, Nebraska
- Harrison Township, Hall County, Nebraska
- Harrison Township, Knox County, Nebraska

== New Jersey ==
- Harrison Township, Gloucester County, New Jersey

== North Dakota ==
- Harrison Township, North Dakota, in Ward County, North Dakota

== Ohio ==
- Harrison Township, Carroll County, Ohio
- Harrison Township, Champaign County, Ohio
- Harrison Township, Darke County, Ohio
- Harrison Township, Gallia County, Ohio
- Harrison Township, Hamilton County, Ohio
- Harrison Township, Henry County, Ohio
- Harrison Township, Knox County, Ohio
- Harrison Township, Licking County, Ohio
- Harrison Township, Logan County, Ohio
- Harrison Township, Montgomery County, Ohio
- Harrison Township, Muskingum County, Ohio
- Harrison Township, Paulding County, Ohio
- Harrison Township, Perry County, Ohio
- Harrison Township, Pickaway County, Ohio
- Harrison Township, Preble County, Ohio
- Harrison Township, Ross County, Ohio
- Harrison Township, Scioto County, Ohio
- Harrison Township, Van Wert County, Ohio
- Harrison Township, Vinton County, Ohio

== Pennsylvania ==
- Harrison Township, Allegheny County, Pennsylvania
- Harrison Township, Bedford County, Pennsylvania
- Harrison Township, Potter County, Pennsylvania

== South Dakota ==
- Harrison Township, Spink County, South Dakota, in Spink County, South Dakota
