= Minot metropolitan area =

- Metropolitan statistical area
- Minot, ND Metropolitan Statistical Area
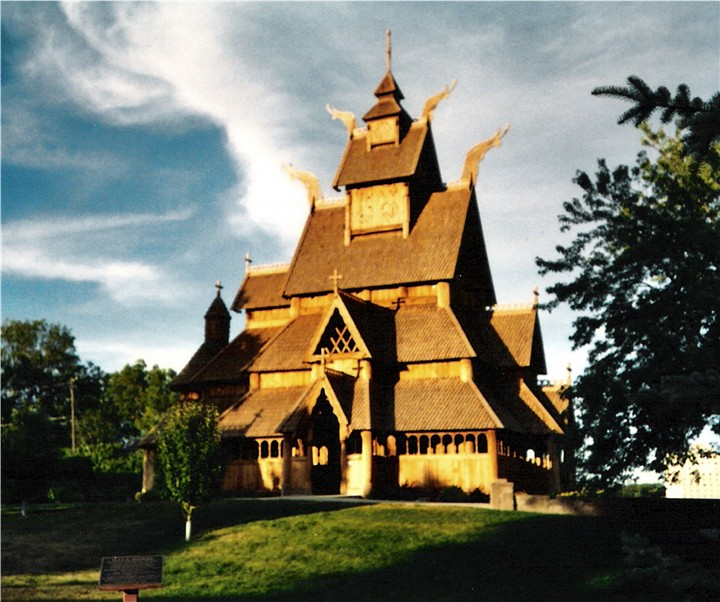
- Gol Stave Church in Scandinavian Heritage Park
Map of Minot, ND MSA
City of Minot
Minot, ND MSA
- Country: United States
- State: North Dakota
- Largest city: Minot
- Other cities: Burlington, Mohall, Surrey, Velva

Area
  - Total: 4,764.115 sq mi (12,339.00 km^{2})
- Highest elevation: 1,716 ft (523 m)
- Lowest elevation: 161 ft (49 m)

Population (2020)
  - Total: 77,546
  - Estimate (2025): 75,694 ▼
  - Rank: 382nd in the U.S.
  - Density: 16.277/sq mi (6.2846/km^{2})
- Time zone: UTC–6 (CST)
  - Summer (DST): UTC–5 (CDT)
- Area codes: 701
- Website: minotnd.gov/MPO

The Minot Metropolitan Statistical Area, as defined by the Census Bureau as comprising all of McHenry, Renville, and Ward Counties in North Dakota, anchored by the city of Minot. As of the 2020 census, the population was 77,546 and was estimated to be 75,694 in 2025.

== Counties ==
- McHenry (5,130)
- Renville (2,331)
- Ward (68,233)

== Communities ==
=== Incorporated Places ===
- Minot (47,440)
- Surrey (1,434)
- Burlington (1,334)
- Velva (1,054)
- Kenmare (919)
- Mohall (718)
- Berthold (468)
- Towner (454)
- Glenburn (419)
- Sawyer (308)
- Drake (278)
- Granville (231)
- Anamoose (216)
- Sherwood (199)
- Des Lacs (178)
- Makoti (146)
- Carpio (139)
- Upham (129)
- Ryder (104)
- Deering (92)
- Douglas (91)
- Karlsruhe (84)
- Donnybrook (73)
- Tolley (43)
- Voltaire (43)
- Balfour (15)
- Bergen (11)
- Grano (10)
- Loraine (9)
- Kief (8)

=== Census-designated places ===
- Minot Air Force Base (5,017)
- Logan (247)
- Ruthville (151)
- Foxholm (56)
- Bantry (6)

=== Unincorporated Places ===
- Berwick
- Denbigh
- Greene
- Hartland
- Norwich
- Verendrye

== Demographics ==
Historical population
Census	Pop.	Note	%±
1890	3,265		—
1900	13,214		304.7%
1910	50,688		283.6%
1920	52,131		2.8%
1930	56,299		8.0%
1940	51,548		−8.4%
1950	52,743		2.3%
1960	62,869		19.2%
1970	71,365		13.5%
1980	69,858		−2.1%
1990	67,609		−3.2%
2000	67,392		−0.3%
2010	69,540		3.2%
2020	77,546		11.5%
2025 (est.)	75,694		−2.4%
U.S. Decennial Census; 1790–1960 1900–1990; 1990–2000 2010–2020

=== 2000 census ===
As of the 2000 census, there were 67,392 people, 26,652 households, and 17,815 families residing in the metropolitan area. The racial makeup of the metropolitan area was 93.17% White, 1.95% African American, 1.86% Native American, 0.74% Asian, 0.05% Pacific Islander, 0.64% from other races, and 1.58% from two or more races. Hispanic or Latino people of any race were 1.73% of the population.

The median income for a household in the metropolitan area was $30,563, and the median income for a family was $37,680. Males had a median income of $26,335 versus $18,345 for females. The per capita income for the metropolitan area was $16,181.

== See also ==
- North Dakota census statistical areas
