= Rice Lake Township, Ward County, North Dakota =

Rice Lake Township, North Dakota
- Township
- Location within North Dakota
- Coordinates: 47°58′42.7″N 101°33′05.2″W
- Country: United States
- State: North Dakota
- County: Ward
- Named for: Rice Lake

Government
  - Clerk/Treasurer: Michele Severson
  - Chairman: Gregory Severson

Area
  - Total: 36.25 sq mi (93.88 km^{2})
  - Land: 34.41 sq mi (89.12 km^{2})
  - Water: 1.83 sq mi (4.75 km^{2})
- Elevation: 2,051 ft (625 m)

Population (2020)
  - Total: 79
  - Density: 2.3/sq mi (0.89/km^{2})
- Time zone: UTC-6 (Central (CST))
  - Summer (DST): UTC-5 (CDT)
- ZIP codes: 58735 (Douglas); 58779 (Ryder)
- Area code: 701
- FIPS code: 38-66420
- GNIS feature ID: 1036959

Rice Lake Township is a township in southern Ward County, North Dakota, United States. The population was 79 at the 2020 census.

== History ==
Rice Lake Township was named after Rice Lake, itself named after postmaster John R. Rice of post office Ricelake, which operated briefly from December 1898 to June 1899.

== Geography ==
Rice Lake Township has a total area of 36.246 square miles (93.88 km^{2}), of which 34.411 square miles (89.12 km^{2}) is land and 1.835 square miles (4.75 km^{2}) is water.

=== Major highways ===
- North Dakota Highway 23

== Demographics ==
As of the 2024 American Community Survey, there were an estimated 21 households with a margin of error of 16.
