= Anna Township, North Dakota =

- Township
- Location within North Dakota
- Coordinates: 47°58′40.7″N 101°40′47.4″W
- Country: United States
- State: North Dakota
- County: Ward

Area
  - Total: 36.43 sq mi (94.35 km^{2})
  - Land: 35.12 sq mi (90.95 km^{2})
  - Water: 1.31 sq mi (3.40 km^{2})
- Elevation: 2,133 ft (650 m)

Population (2020)
  - Total: 39
  - Density: 1.1/sq mi (0.43/km^{2})
- Time zone: UTC-6 (Central (CST))
  - Summer (DST): UTC-5 (CDT)
- ZIP codes: 58756 (Makoti); 58779 (Ryder)
- Area code: 701
- FIPS code: 38-02420
- GNIS feature ID: 1037001

Anna Township is a township in Ward County, North Dakota, United States. The population was 39 at the 2020 census.

== History ==
The township was likely organized in the late 19th century.

On August 12, 1903, a post office named Bye, for local settler Ole J. Bye was opened until 1906. The community had about 7 people.

== Geography ==
Anna Township has a total area of 36.428 square miles (94.35 km^{2}), of which 35.117 square miles (90.95 km^{2}) is land and 1.311 square miles (3.40 km^{2}) is water.

=== Major highways ===
- North Dakota Highway 23
- North Dakota Highway 28

== Demographics ==
Historical population
Census	Pop.	Note	%±
1910	121		—
1920	170		40.5%
1930	150		−11.8%
1940	121		−19.3%
1950	100		−17.4%
1960	67		−33.0%
1970	66		−1.5%
1980	47		−28.8%
1990	37		−21.3%
2000	35		−5.4%
2010	29		−17.1%
2020	39		34.5%

As of the 2024 American Community Survey, there were an estimated 20 households, with a margin of error of 14.
