= Baden Township, North Dakota =

- Township
- Location within North Dakota
- Coordinates: 48°35′22.5″N 102°02′22.4″W
- Country: United States
- State: North Dakota
- County: Ward
- Named after: Baden, Germany

Area
  - Total: 35.80 sq mi (92.73 km^{2})
  - Land: 34.86 sq mi (90.29 km^{2})
  - Water: 0.94 sq mi (2.43 km^{2})
- Elevation: 1,982 ft (604 m)

Population (2020)
  - Total: 47
  - Density: 1.3/sq mi (0.52/km^{2})
- Time zone: UTC-6 (Central (CST))
  - Summer (DST): UTC-5 (CDT)
- ZIP codes: 58734 (Donnybrook); 58746 (Kenmare)
- Area code: 701
- FIPS code: 38-04140
- GNIS feature ID: 1759673

Baden Township is a township in Ward County, North Dakota, United States. The population was 47 at the 2020 census.

== History ==
The former community of Baden was located within the township, hence its name. It was named after the historical region in Germany.

Other former communities within Baden Township include Enterprise and Galva.

== Geography ==
Baden Township has a total area of 35.802 square miles (92.73 km^{2}), of which 34.862 square miles (90.29 km^{2}) is land and 0.940 square miles (2.43 km^{2}) is water.

The Des Lacs River flows through the township's eastern portion.

=== Major highways ===
- U.S. Highway 52
- North Dakota Highway 50

== Demographics ==
As of the 2024 American Community Survey, there were an estimated 11 households with a margin of error of 10.
