= Cameron Township, North Dakota =

- Township
- Location within North Dakota
- Coordinates: 47°53′28.7″N 101°33′02.2″W
- Country: United States
- State: North Dakota
- County: Ward

Area
  - Total: 35.54 sq mi (92.05 km^{2})
  - Land: 34.62 sq mi (89.66 km^{2})
  - Water: 0.92 sq mi (2.39 km^{2})

Population (2020)
  - Total: 26
  - Density: 0.75/sq mi (0.29/km^{2})
- Time zone: UTC-6 (Central (CST))
  - Summer (DST): UTC-5 (CDT)
- ZIP codes: 58735 (Douglas); 58779 (Ryder)
- Area code: 701
- FIPS code: 38-11740
- GNIS feature ID: 1036956

Cameron Township is a township in Ward County, North Dakota, United States. The population was 26 at the 2020 census.

The city of Douglas is surrounded by Cameron Township.

== Geography ==
Cameron Township has a total area of 35.539 square miles (92.05 km^{2}), of which 34.617 square miles (89.66 km^{2}) is land and 0.922 square miles (2.39 km^{2}) is water.

=== Major highways ===
- North Dakota Highway 53
