= Berthold Township, North Dakota =

- Township
- Location within North Dakota
- Coordinates: 48°19′39.1″N 101°43′41.5″W
- Country: United States
- State: North Dakota
- County: Ward
- Named after: Fort Berthold

Area
  - Total: 35.32 sq mi (91.48 km^{2})
  - Land: 35.05 sq mi (90.78 km^{2})
  - Water: 0.27 sq mi (0.70 km^{2})
- Elevation: 2,044 ft (623 m)

Population (2020)
  - Total: 85
  - Density: 2.4/sq mi (0.94/km^{2})
- Time zone: UTC-6 (Central (CST))
  - Summer (DST): UTC-5 (CDT)
- ZIP code: 58718 (Berthold)
- Area code: 701
- FIPS code: 38-06500
- GNIS feature ID: 1036946

Berthold Township is a township in Ward County, North Dakota, United States. The population was 85 at the 2020 census.

The city of Berthold is located within the township, however it is administratively separate.

== History ==
Berthold Township traces its name to Fort Berthold, itself named after local settler Bartholomew Berthold.

== Geography ==
Berthold Township has a total area of 35.321 square miles (91.48 km^{2}), of which 35.049 square miles (90.78 km^{2}) is land and 0.272 square miles (0.70 km^{2}) is water.

=== Major highways ===
- U.S. Highway 2
- North Dakota Highway 28

== Demographics ==
As of the 2024 American Community Survey, there were an estimated 29 households, with a margin of error of 26.
