= Brillian Township, North Dakota =

- Township
- Location within North Dakota
- Coordinates: 47°58′41.4″N 101°02′06″W
- Country: United States
- State: North Dakota
- County: Ward

Area
  - Total: 36.21 sq mi (93.79 km^{2})
  - Land: 36.20 sq mi (93.76 km^{2})
  - Water: 0.012 sq mi (0.03 km^{2})
- Elevation: 1,795 ft (547 m)

Population (2020)
  - Total: 48
  - Density: 1.3/sq mi (0.51/km^{2})
- Time zone: UTC-6 (Central (CST))
  - Summer (DST): UTC-5 (CDT)
- ZIP codes: 58781 (Sawyer); 58790 (Velva)
- Area code: 701
- FIPS code: 38-09380
- GNIS feature ID: 1759674

Brillian Township is a township in Ward County, North Dakota, United States. The population was 48 at the 2020 census.

== History ==
A post office called Robinson was briefly established in Brillian Township in the early 20th century. It was named after its first postmaster, George L. Robinson.

== Geography ==
Brillian Township has a total area of 36.214 square miles (93.79 km^{2}), of which 36.202 square miles (93.76 km^{2}) is land and 0.012 square miles (0.031 km^{2}) is water.

=== Major highways ===
- North Dakota Highway 23

== Demographics ==
As of the 2024 American Community Survey, there were an estimated 29 households.
