= Harrison Township, Nebraska =

Harrison Township, Nebraska may refer to the following places:

- Harrison Township, Buffalo County, Nebraska
- Harrison Township, Knox County, Nebraska

== See also ==
- Harrison Township (disambiguation)
