= Burt Township, North Dakota =

- Township
- Location within North Dakota
- Coordinates: 48°09′11.9″N 101°28′08.1″W
- Country: United States
- State: North Dakota
- County: Ward

Area
  - Total: 36.12 sq mi (93.55 km^{2})
  - Land: 35.70 sq mi (92.45 km^{2})
  - Water: 0.42 sq mi (1.10 km^{2})

Population (2020)
  - Total: 134
  - Density: 3.75/sq mi (1.45/km^{2})
- Time zone: UTC-6 (Central (CST))
  - Summer (DST): UTC-5 (CDT)
- ZIP codes: 58701 (Minot); 58722 (Burlington); 58733 (Des Lacs)
- Area code: 701
- FIPS code: 38-11100
- GNIS feature ID: 1037049

Burt Township is a township in central Ward County, North Dakota, United States. The population was 134 at the 2020 census.

== History ==
A settlement called Drady existed within the township until its post office closed in 1934. It was named after John Drady, the town's postmaster, who settled from Moorhead, Minnesota.

The settlement of Caithness also existed until its post office closed in 1903.

== Geography ==
Burt Township has a total area of 36.118 square miles (93.55 km^{2}), of which 35.695 square miles (92.45 km^{2}) is land and 0.423 square miles (1.10 km^{2}) is water.

== Demographics ==
As of the 2024 American Community Survey, there were an estimated 13 households.
