= Burlington Township, North Dakota =

- Township
- Location within North Dakota
- Coordinates: 48°14′24.5″N 101°28′07″W
- Country: United States
- State: North Dakota
- County: Ward
- Named after: Burlington, Iowa

Area
  - Total: 34.44 sq mi (89.20 km^{2})
  - Land: 34.38 sq mi (89.05 km^{2})
  - Water: 0.06 sq mi (0.16 km^{2})

Population (2020)
  - Total: 398
  - Density: 11.6/sq mi (4.47/km^{2})
- Time zone: UTC-6 (Central (CST))
  - Summer (DST): UTC-5 (CDT)
- ZIP codes: 58701 (Minot); 58722 (Burlington); 58733 (Des Lacs)
- Area code: 701
- FIPS code: 38-10980
- GNIS feature ID: 1036986

Burlington Township is a township in Ward County, North Dakota, United States. The population was 398 at the 2020 census.

== History ==
The township, as well as the neighboring city of Burlington, were named after Burlington, Iowa.

== Geography ==
Burlington Township has a total area of 34.442 square miles (89.20 km^{2}), of which 34.382 square miles (89.05 km^{2}) is land and 0.060 square miles (0.16 km^{2}) is water.

=== Major highways ===
- U.S. Highway 2
- U.S. Highway 52

== Demographics ==
As of the 2024 American Community Survey, there were an estimated 100 households, with a margin of error of 49.
