= North Dakota Highway 28 =

State highway in North Dakota, U.S.

North Dakota Highway 28

Route information
- Maintained by NDDOT
- Existed: 1926–present

Southern segment
- Length: 16.090 mi (25.894 km)
- South end: ND 37 near Ryder
- North end: ND 23 near Ryder

Northern segment
- Length: 50.912 mi (81.935 km)
- South end: US 2 in Berthold
- Major intersections: US 52 in Carpio; ND 5 near Mohall
- North end: Highway 8 at the Canadian border in Sherwood

Location
- Country: United States
- State: North Dakota
- Counties: McLean, Ward, Renville

Highway system
- North Dakota State Highway System; Interstate; US; State
← ND 27	→ I-29

North Dakota Highway 28 (ND 28) is a north–south state highway in the U.S. state of North Dakota. The southern segments southern terminus is at ND 37 south of Ryder and the northern terminus is at ND 23 north of Ryder. The northern segments southern terminus is at U.S. Route 2 (US 2) in Berthold and the northern terminus is a continuation as Saskatchewan Highway 8 at the Canada/ North Dakota border.

== Route description ==
=== Southern segment ===
The shorter segment of ND 28 runs from ND 37 to ND 23 near Ryder. Ryder is the only major settlement along this stretch of ND 28.

=== Northern segment ===
Resuming at US 2 in Berthold, ND 28 runs for nine miles before crossing US 52 in Carpio. The next 22.6 miles of ND 28 serves primarily rural areas though it does cross Lake Darling near Greene before turning right onto ND 5. After a three mile concurrency, ND 28 leaves ND 5 and ends at the Canadian border near Sherwood, 16.3 miles north of the intersection.

== Major intersections ==
County	Location	mi	km	Destinations	Notes
McLean		0.000	0.000	ND 37 – Roseglen, Garrison	Beginning of southern section
Ward		16.090	25.894	ND 23 – US 83, Minot, Makoti, New Town	End of southern section
Gap in route
Ward	Berthold	0.000	0.000	US 2 – Berthold, Stanley, Minot	Beginning of northern section
Ward	Carpio	9.010	14.500	US 52 – Minot, Kenmare	
Renville		31.609	50.870	ND 5 west – Bowbells	Southern end of ND 5 concurrency
Renville		34.612	55.703	ND 5 east – Mohall	Northern end of ND 5 concurrency
Renville	Sherwood	50.912	81.935	Canada–United States border at Sherwood–Carievale Border Crossing	
Renville	Sherwood	50.912	81.935	Highway 8 north – Carievale, Moosomin	End of northern section; continuation into Saskatchewan
1.000 mi = 1.609 km; 1.000 km = 0.621 mi: Concurrency terminus
