= Foxholm, North Dakota =

Community in North Dakota, United States

- Census-designated place & Unincorporated community
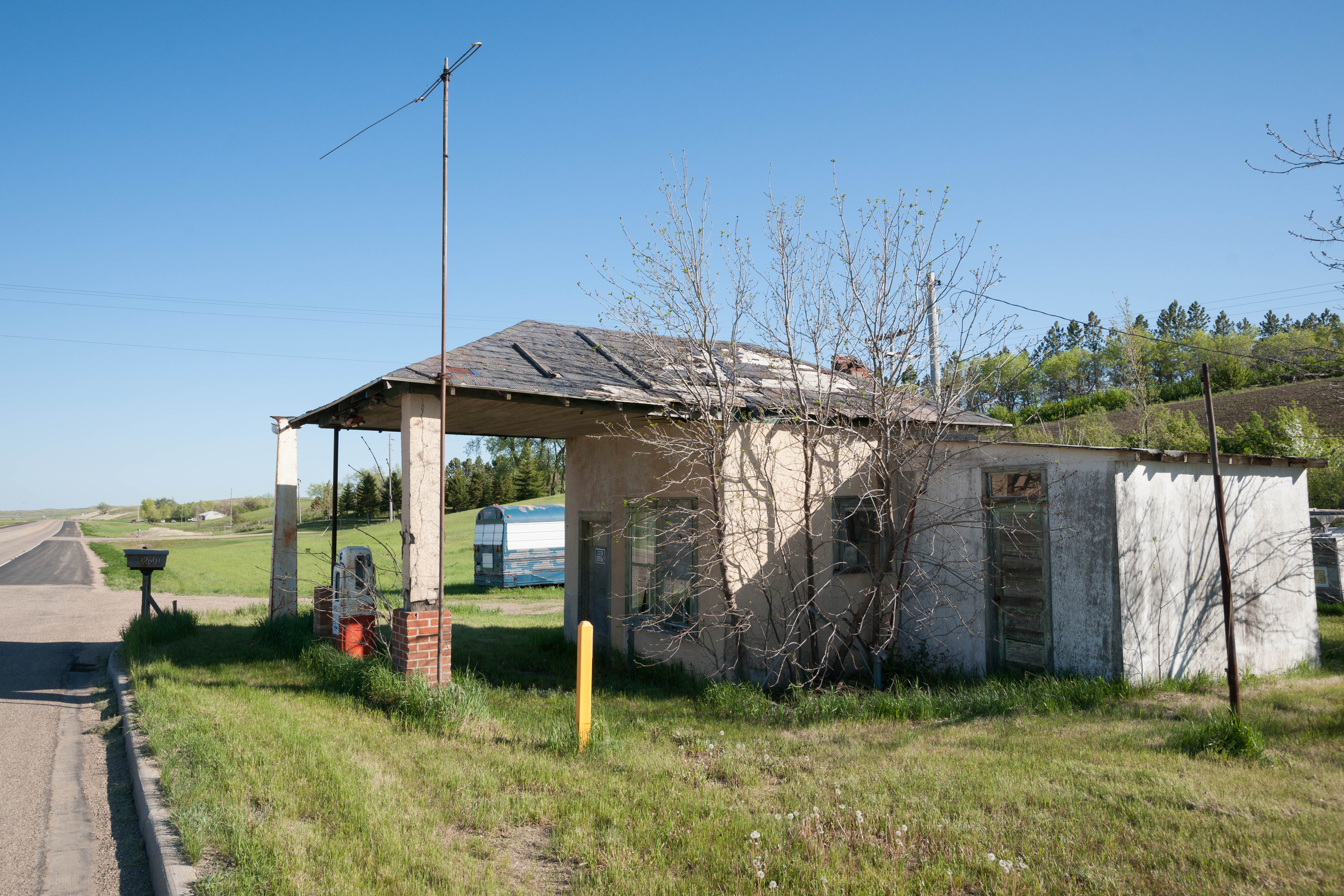
- Abandoned Gas Station in Foxholm

- Location within North Dakota
- Coordinates: 48°21′55″N 101°34′20″W
- Country: United States
- State: North Dakota
- County: Ward

Area
  - Total: 0.96 sq mi (2.48 km^{2})
  - Land: 0.96 sq mi (2.48 km^{2})
  - Water: 0 sq mi (0.00 km^{2})
- Elevation: 1,677 ft (511 m)

Population (2020)
  - Total: 56
  - Density: 58.4/sq mi (22.54/km^{2})
- Time zone: UTC-6 (Central (CST))
  - Summer (DST): UTC-5 (CDT)
- Area code: 701
- GNIS feature ID: 2584343

Foxholm is a census-designated place and unincorporated community in Ward County, North Dakota, United States. As of the 2020 census, Foxholm had a population of 56.

Foxholm is located along U.S. Route 52, 18 miles (29 km) northwest of Minot and 76 miles (122 km) southeast of the Saskatchewan and North Dakota border at Portal, ND/North Portal, SK. Foxholm is in the Des Lacs River Valley.

== History ==
A post office called Foxholm was established in 1894, and remained in operation until 1967. The community supposedly was named after a place in England. The population was 250 in 1940.

== Demographics ==
Historical population
Census	Pop.	Note	%±
2020	56		—
U.S. Decennial Census
