= Ward County, North Dakota =

County in North Dakota, United States

- County
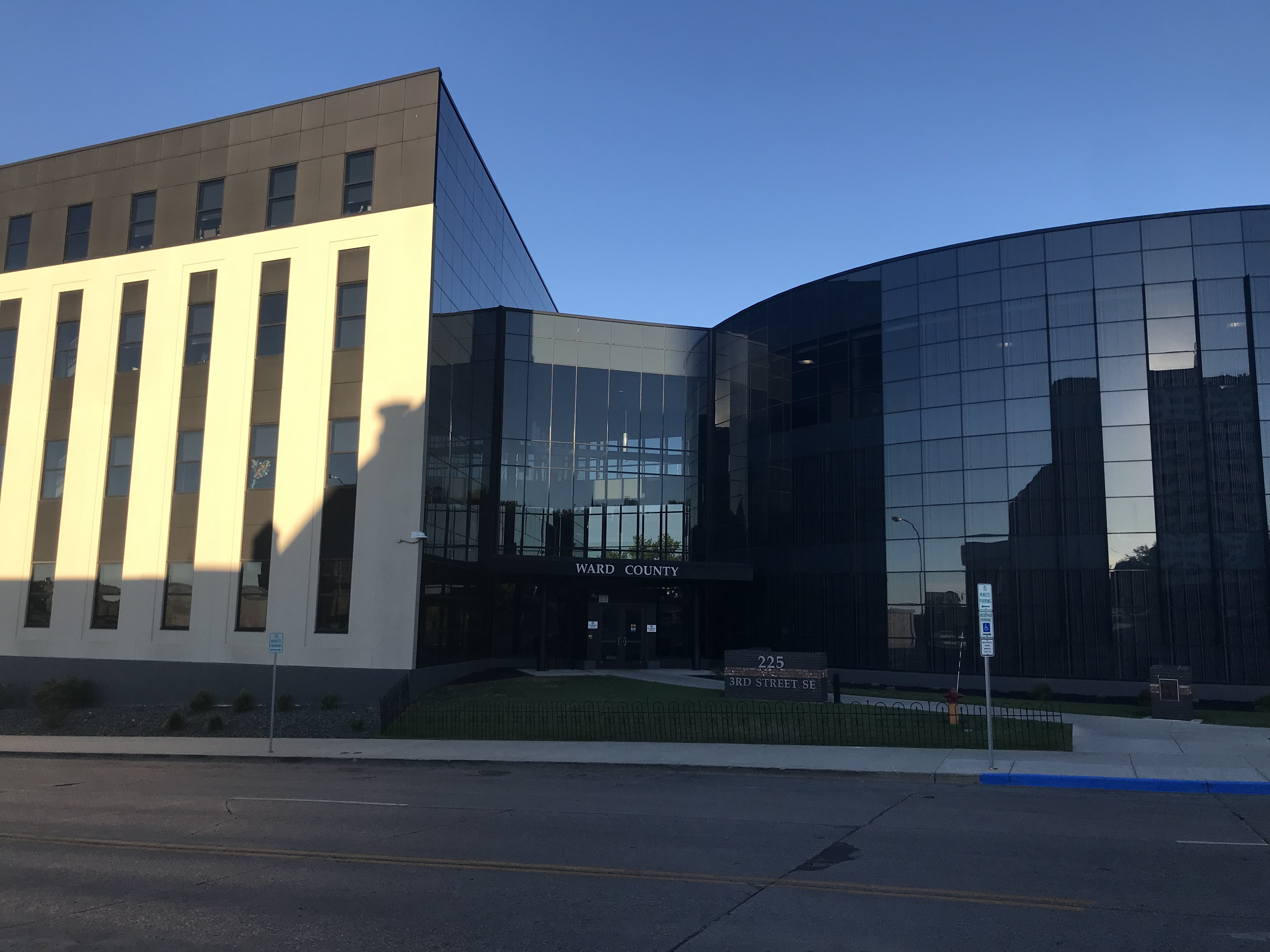
- Ward County Administration Building

- Seal Logo

- Location within the U.S. state of North Dakota
- Coordinates: 48.2167°N 101.5405°W
- Country: United States
- State: North Dakota
- Founded: April 14, 1885 (created); November 23, 1885 (organized)
- Named for: Mark Ward
- Seat: Minot
- Largest city: Minot

Area
  - Total: 2,055.980 sq mi (5,324.96 km^{2})
  - Land: 2,013.029 sq mi (5,213.72 km^{2})
  - Water: 42.951 sq mi (111.24 km^{2}) 2.09%

Population (2020)
  - Total: 69,919
  - Estimate (2025): 68,233 ▼
  - Density: 34.733/sq mi (13.411/km^{2})
- Time zone: UTC−6 (Central)
  - Summer (DST): UTC−5 (CDT)
- Area code: 701
- Congressional district: At-large
- Website: co.ward.nd.us

Ward County is a county in the U.S. state of North Dakota. As of the 2020 census, the population was 69,919, and was estimated to be 68,233 in 2025. making it the fourth-most populous county in North Dakota. The county seat and the largest city is Minot.

Ward County is part of the Minot, North Dakota metropolitan area as comprising all of McHenry, Renville, and Ward Counties.

== History ==
The Dakota Territory legislature created the county on April 14, 1885, with areas partitioned from Renville, Stevens, and Wynn counties (Stevens and Wynn counties are now defunct). The county government was not organized at that date; the organization was effected on November 23 of that year. The county was named for Mark Ward, chairman of the House of Representatives Committee on Counties during the session. Burlington was the county seat; this was changed to Minot in 1888.

The boundaries of Ward County were altered two times in 1887, and in 1892, 1909 and 1910. The present county boundaries have been in place since 1910.

Until 1908, Ward County included what is now Burke, Mountrail, and Renville counties; this landmass often being referred to as 'Imperial Ward' County and which was the largest county in the state at the time. In 1908, voters took up measures to partition the county. The results for that portion forming Mountrail County were accepted but the results for the portions that would become Burke and Renville counties were disputed in court, which resulted in favorable rulings in 1910. When the proposed county lines for Burke and Renville counties were drawn, neither group wanted to include Kenmare and risk that city's becoming the county seat, so Kenmare was left in Ward County at the end of a narrow strip of land, commonly referred to as the 'gooseneck'. One of the options reportedly considered around this time was to create a fifth county, Lake, with Kenmare as its seat.

== Geography ==
The Des Lacs River flows southeasterly through the northeast part of the county before doubling to the northeast on its journey to Lake Winnipeg. The county terrain consists of low rolling hills, dotted with ponds and lakes in its southern part, and carved by drainage gullies. The area is largely devoted to agriculture. The terrain slopes to the east and north, with its highest point near the southwest corner, at 2,175 ft (663 m) ASL.

According to the United States Census Bureau, the county has a total area of 2,055.980 square miles (5,324.96 km^{2}), of which 2,013.029 square miles (5,213.72 km^{2}) is land and 42.951 square miles (111.24 km^{2}) (2.09%) is water. It is the fifth-largest county in North Dakota by total area.

=== Major highways ===
- U.S. Highway 2
- U.S. Highway 52
- U.S. Highway 83
- North Dakota Highway 5
- North Dakota Highway 23
- North Dakota Highway 28
- North Dakota Highway 50

=== Transit ===
- Amtrak Empire Builder (Minot station)
- Minot City Transit
- Souris Basin Transportation

=== Adjacent counties ===
- Renville County – north
- McHenry County – east
- McLean County – south
- Mountrail County – west
- Burke County – northwest

=== Protected areas ===
- Des Lacs National Wildlife Refuge (part)
- Hiddenwood National Wildlife Refuge (part)
- National Wildfowl Production Areas
- Upper Souris National Wildlife Refuge (part)

=== Lakes ===
- Carpenter Lake
- Douglas Lake (part)
- Hiddenwood Lake (part)
- Makoti Lake
- Rice Lake
- Rush Lake

== Demographics ==
Historical population
Census	Pop.	Note	%±
1890	1,681		—
1900	7,961		373.6%
1910	25,221		216.8%
1920	28,811		14.2%
1930	33,597		16.6%
1940	31,981		−4.8%
1950	34,782		8.8%
1960	47,072		35.3%
1970	58,560		24.4%
1980	58,392		−0.3%
1990	57,921		−0.8%
2000	58,975		1.8%
2010	61,675		4.6%
2020	69,919		13.4%
2025 (est.)	68,233		−2.4%
U.S. Decennial Census; 1790–1960 1900–1990; 1990–2000 2010–2020

As of the third quarter of 2025, the median home value in Ward County was $294,489.

As of the 2024 American Community Survey, there are 29,798 estimated households in Ward County with an average of 2.23 persons per household. The county has a median household income of $69,069. Approximately 11.2% of the county's population lives at or below the poverty line. Ward County has an estimated 57.3% employment rate, with 31.2% of the population holding a bachelor's degree or higher and 94.4% holding a high school diploma. There were 32,734 housing units at an average density of 16.26 per square mile (6.3/km^{2}).

The median age in the county was 34.7 years.

Ward County, North Dakota – racial and ethnic composition Note: the US Census treats Hispanic/Latino as an ethnic category. This table excludes Latinos from the racial categories and assigns them to a separate category. Hispanics/Latinos may be of any race.
Race / ethnicity (NH = non-Hispanic)	Pop. 1980	Pop. 1990	Pop. 2000	Pop. 2010	Pop. 2020	Pop. 2024
White alone (NH)	55,380 (94.84%)	54,131 (93.46%)	53,786 (91.48%)	54,717 (88.72%)	55,673 (79.62%)	55,029 (80.42%)
Black or African American alone (NH)	1,074 (1.84%)	1,385 (2.39%)	1,262 (2.15%)	1,469 (2.38%)	2,853 (4.08%)	3,089 (4.51%)
Native American or Alaska Native alone (NH)	667 (1.14%)	946 (1.63%)	1,180 (2.01%)	1,533 (2.49%)	1,570 (2.25%)	1,694 (2.48%)
Asian alone (NH)	330 (0.57%)	566 (0.98%)	474 (0.81%)	550 (0.89%)	1,087 (1.55%)	1,184 (1.73%)
Pacific Islander alone (NH)	—	—	29 (0.05%)	76 (0.12%)	129 (0.18%)	115 (0.17%)
Other race alone (NH)	185 (0.32%)	36 (0.06%)	41 (0.07%)	34 (0.06%)	250 (0.36%)	—
Mixed race or multiracial (NH)	—	—	898 (1.53%)	1,427 (2.31%)	3,767 (5.39%)	2,046 (2.99%)
Hispanic or Latino (any race)	756 (1.29%)	857 (1.48%)	1,125 (1.91%)	1,869 (3.03%)	4,590 (6.56%)	5,270 (7.70%)
Total	58,392 (100.00%)	57,921 (100.00%)	58,975 (100.00%)	61,675 (100.00%)	69,919 (100.00%)	68,427 (100.00%)

=== 2024 estimate ===
As of the 2024 estimate, there were 68,427 people, 29,798 households, and _ families residing in the county. The population density was 33.99 inhabitants per square mile (13.1/km^{2}). There were 32,734 housing units at an average density of 16.26 per square mile (6.3/km^{2}). The racial makeup of the county was 86.55% White, 4.94% African American, 2.97% Native American, 1.83% Asian, 0.21% Pacific Islander, _% from some other races and 3.50% from two or more races. Hispanic or Latino people of any race were 7.70% of the population.

=== 2020 census ===
As of the 2020 census, there were 69,919 people, 28,847 households, and 17,323 families residing in the county. The population density was 34.73 inhabitants per square mile (13.4/km^{2}). There were 32,176 housing units at an average density of 15.98 per square mile (6.2/km^{2}). The racial makeup of the county was 81.58% White, 4.33% African American, 2.44% Native American, 1.60% Asian, 0.19% Pacific Islander, 1.97% from some other races and 7.89% from two or more races. Hispanic or Latino people of any race were 6.56% of the population.

There were 28,847 households in the county, of which 30.5% had children under the age of 18 living with them and 22.9% had a female householder with no spouse or partner present. About 32.1% of all households were made up of individuals and 9.5% had someone living alone who was 65 years of age or older.

Of the residents, 24.5% were under the age of 18 and 13.3% were 65 years of age or older; the median age was 32.8 years. For every 100 females there were 104.9 males, and for every 100 females age 18 and over there were 105.1 males. Among occupied housing units, 57.2% were owner-occupied and 42.8% were renter-occupied; the homeowner vacancy rate was 2.3% and the rental vacancy rate was 9.9%.

=== 2010 census ===
As of the 2010 census, there were 61,675 people, 25,029 households, and 15,597 families residing in the county. The population density was 30.64 inhabitants per square mile (11.8/km^{2}). There were 26,744 housing units at an average density of 13.28 per square mile (5.1/km^{2}). The racial makeup of the county was 90.35% White, 2.50% African American, 2.64% Native American, 0.95% Asian, 0.14% Pacific Islander, 0.69% from some other races and 2.74% from two or more races. Hispanic or Latino people of any race were 3.03% of the population.

In terms of ancestry, 44.4% were German, 30.8% were Norwegian, 11.6% were Irish, 5.7% were English, and 2.3% were American.

There were 25,029 households, 30.6% had children under the age of 18 living with them, 49.9% were married couples living together, 8.4% had a female householder with no husband present, 37.7% were non-families, and 30.0% of all households were made up of individuals. The average household size was 2.36 and the average family size was 2.95. The median age was 32.7 years.

The median income for a household in the county was $48,793 and the median income for a family was $60,361. Males had a median income of $37,569 versus $28,415 for females. The per capita income for the county was $25,326. About 6.7% of families and 9.4% of the population were below the poverty line, including 13.0% of those under age 18 and 10.3% of those age 65 or over.

== Communities ==
=== Cities ===
- Berthold
- Burlington
- Carpio
- Des Lacs
- Donnybrook
- Douglas
- Kenmare
- Makoti
- Minot (county seat)
- Ryder
- Sawyer
- Surrey

=== Census-designated places ===
- Foxholm
- Logan
- Minot AFB
- Ruthville

=== Unincorporated communities ===
- Aurelia – (ghost town)
- Drady
- Gassman – founded when the Gassman Creek Coulee trestle was being built, now referred to as "Trestle Valley"
- Hartland – (ghost town)
- Hesnault
- Lonetree
- Rice Lake – community at Rice Lake near Minot
- South Prairie
- Wolseth

=== Historical areas ===
- Harrison – early community, now part of Minot
- Ralston – railroad siding
- Waldorf – early community, now part of Minot

=== Townships ===
- Afton
- Anna
- Baden
- Berthold
- Brillian
- Burlington
- Burt
- Cameron
- Carbondale
- Carpio
- Denmark
- Des Lacs
- Elmdale
- Eureka
- Evergreen
- Foxholm
- Freedom
- Gasman
- Greely
- Greenbush
- Harrison
- Hiddenwood
- Hilton
- Iota Flat
- Kenmare
- Kirkelie
- Linton
- Lund
- Mandan
- Margaret
- Maryland
- Mayland
- McKinley
- Nedrose
- New Prairie
- Newman
- Orlien
- Passport
- Ree
- Rice Lake
- Rolling Green
- Rushville
- Ryder
- St. Marys
- Sauk Prairie
- Sawyer
- Shealy
- Spencer
- Spring Lake
- Sundre
- Surrey
- Tatman
- Tolgen
- Torning
- Vang
- Waterford
- Willis

== Politics ==
Ward County voters are traditionally and increasingly Republican. The Democratic Party presidential candidate has only won the county once since 1944, during Lyndon B. Johnson's landslide victory in 1964. In 2024, Donald Trump received 72.3% of the vote in this county, the highest for any candidate since Theodore Roosevelt.

United States presidential election results for Ward County, North Dakota
Year	Republican		Democratic		Third party(ies)	
Year	No.	%	No.	%	No.	%
1900	880	68.06%	364	28.15%	49	3.79%
1904	4,349	78.15%	914	16.42%	302	5.43%
1908	5,286	57.39%	3,163	34.34%	761	8.26%
1912	686	19.59%	1,071	30.58%	1,745	49.83%
1916	1,743	35.43%	2,791	56.74%	385	7.83%
1920	6,166	67.41%	2,291	25.05%	690	7.54%
1924	4,166	47.99%	721	8.31%	3,794	43.70%
1928	6,561	59.72%	4,362	39.71%	63	0.57%
1932	4,195	33.23%	8,129	64.38%	302	2.39%
1936	3,142	22.36%	8,872	63.12%	2,041	14.52%
1940	6,519	45.61%	7,669	53.66%	105	0.73%
1944	5,514	48.30%	5,822	50.99%	81	0.71%
1948	5,514	48.64%	5,189	45.77%	634	5.59%
1952	10,130	66.60%	4,966	32.65%	115	0.76%
1956	9,042	60.96%	5,762	38.85%	28	0.19%
1960	9,680	54.83%	7,954	45.06%	19	0.11%
1964	6,798	38.33%	10,871	61.30%	66	0.37%
1968	9,079	53.11%	7,105	41.56%	911	5.33%
1972	13,900	66.61%	6,706	32.14%	262	1.26%
1976	12,751	56.12%	9,484	41.74%	486	2.14%
1980	14,997	67.59%	5,554	25.03%	1,638	7.38%
1984	16,077	68.06%	7,336	31.05%	210	0.89%
1988	13,179	56.74%	9,906	42.65%	143	0.62%
1992	12,056	46.63%	7,856	30.39%	5,940	22.98%
1996	10,546	48.01%	8,660	39.43%	2,758	12.56%
2000	13,997	62.26%	7,533	33.51%	952	4.23%
2004	17,008	66.41%	8,236	32.16%	368	1.44%
2008	15,061	58.45%	10,144	39.37%	563	2.18%
2012	16,230	63.74%	8,441	33.15%	792	3.11%
2016	18,636	67.98%	5,806	21.18%	2,970	10.83%
2020	19,974	70.71%	7,293	25.82%	979	3.47%
2024	20,635	72.27%	7,215	25.27%	702	2.46%

== Education ==
School districts include:

- Garrison Public School, District 51, Garrison
- Glenburn Public School, District 26, Glenburn
- Kenmare Public School, District 28, Kenmare
- Lewis and Clark Public School District, District 161, Berthold
- Max Public School, District 50, Max
- Minot Public Schools, District 1, Minot
- Nedrose Public School, District 4, Minot
- Sawyer Public School, District 16, Sawyer
- South Prairie Public School, District 70, Minot
- Surrey Public School, District 41, Surrey
- United Public School, District 7, Des Lacs
- Velva Public School, District 1, Velva

== See also ==
- National Register of Historic Places listings in Ward County, North Dakota
