= Nedrose Township, North Dakota =

- Township
- Location within North Dakota
- Coordinates: 48°14′21″N 101°12′52.5″W
- Country: United States
- State: North Dakota
- County: Ward

Government
  - Clerk/Treasurer: Lisa Wolf
  - Chairman: Kimberly Hrichena

Area
  - Total: 25.57 sq mi (66.22 km^{2})
  - Land: 24.90 sq mi (64.50 km^{2})
  - Water: 0.66 sq mi (1.72 km^{2})
- Elevation: 1,641 ft (500 m)

Population (2020)
  - Total: 2,334
  - Density: 93.72/sq mi (36.19/km^{2})
- Time zone: UTC-6 (Central (CST))
  - Summer (DST): UTC-5 (CDT)
- ZIP codes: 58701, 58703 (Minot); 58785 (Surrey)
- Area code: 701
- FIPS code: 38-55700
- GNIS feature ID: 1759687

Nedrose Township is a township in Ward County, North Dakota, United States. The population was 2,334 at the 2020 census, the highest of its kind in the county.

== Geography ==
Nedrose Township has a total area of 25.566 square miles (66.22 km^{2}), of which 24.903 square miles (64.50 km^{2}) is land and 0.663 square miles (1.72 km^{2}) is water.

=== Major highways ===
- U.S. Highway 2
- U.S. Highway 52

== Demographics ==
As of the 2024 American Community Survey, there were an estimated 786 households.
