= Logan, North Dakota =

- Census-designated place & Unincorporated community
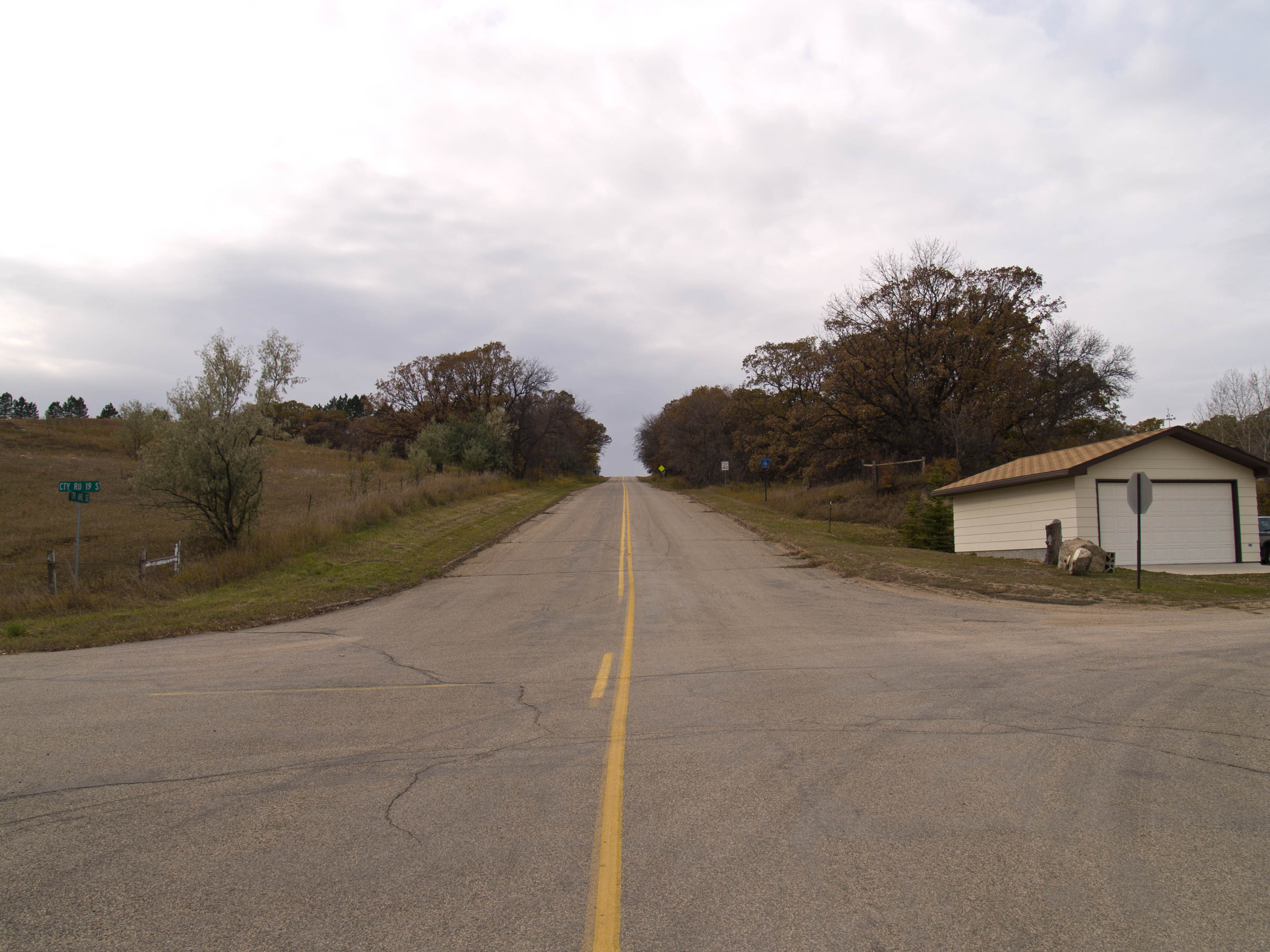
- Street in Logan

- Location within North Dakota
- Coordinates: 48°09′21″N 101°09′59″W
- Country: United States
- State: North Dakota
- County: Ward

Area
  - Total: 1.47 sq mi (3.81 km^{2})
  - Land: 1.46 sq mi (3.78 km^{2})
  - Water: 0.012 sq mi (0.03 km^{2})
- Elevation: 1,686 ft (514 m)

Population (2020)
  - Total: 247
  - Density: 169.3/sq mi (65.37/km^{2})
- Time zone: UTC-6 (CST)
  - Summer (DST): UTC-5 (CDT)
- ZIP Code: 58701
- Area code: 701
- GNIS feature ID: 2584350

Logan is a census-designated place and unincorporated community in Ward County, North Dakota, United States. Its population was 247 as of the 2020 census.

== Demographics ==
Historical population
Census	Pop.	Note	%±
2010	194		—
2020	247		27.3%
U.S. Decennial Census; 2020 Census

=== 2020 census ===
At the census of 2020, there were 247 people in 105 households. There were 95 housing units.
