= Harrison Township, North Dakota =

- Township
- Location within North Dakota
- Coordinates: 48°14′24.4″N 101°22′08.9″W
- Country: United States
- State: North Dakota
- County: Ward
- Named for: Benjamin Harrison

Government
  - Clerk: Kim Rossland
  - Treasurer: Renetta Pearson
  - Chairman: Jon Lockthowe

Area
  - Total: 19.59 sq mi (50.74 km^{2})
  - Land: 19.59 sq mi (50.73 km^{2})
  - Water: 0.003 sq mi (0.0078 km^{2})
- Elevation: 1,565 ft (477 m)
- Time zone: UTC-6 (Central (CST))
  - Summer (DST): UTC-5 (CDT)
- ZIP codes: 58701, 58703 (Minot)
- Area code: 701
- FIPS code: 38-35700
- GNIS feature ID: 1759681

Harrison Township is a township in Ward County, North Dakota, United States. The population was 1,759 at the 2020 census.

== History ==
The township was named after former U.S. president Benjamin Harrison. A settlement also called Harrison was briefly located here before being annexed by neighboring Minot.

== Geography ==
Harrison Township has a total area of 19.589 square miles (50.74 km^{2}), of which 19.586 square miles (50.73 km^{2}) is land and 0.003 square miles (0.0078 km^{2}) is water.

=== Major highways ===
- U.S. Highway 52
- U.S. Highway 83

== Demographics ==
As of the 2024 American Community Survey, there were an estimated 762 households.
