= Denmark Township, North Dakota =

- Township
- Location within North Dakota
- Coordinates: 48°45′49.5″N 102°05′13.9″W
- Country: United States
- State: North Dakota
- County: Ward
- Named for: Denmark

Government
  - Clerk/Treasurer: Loren Johnson
  - Chairman: Brian Wittman

Area
  - Total: 35.91 sq mi (93.00 km^{2})
  - Land: 33.74 sq mi (87.38 km^{2})
  - Water: 2.17 sq mi (5.63 km^{2})
- Elevation: 1,565 ft (477 m)

Population (2020)
  - Total: 76
  - Density: 2.3/sq mi (0.87/km^{2})
- Time zone: UTC-6 (Central (CST))
  - Summer (DST): UTC-5 (CDT)
- FIPS code: 38-19140
- GNIS feature ID: 1759675

Denmark Township is a township in Ward County, North Dakota, United States. The population was 76 at the 2020 census.

It was named after Denmark in note of its Danish settlers.

== Geography ==
Denmark Township has a total area of 35.909 square miles (93.00 km^{2}), of which 33.737 square miles (87.38 km^{2}) is land and 2.172 square miles (5.63 km^{2}) is water.
