= Hartland, North Dakota =

Hartland
- Ghost town
- Interactive map of Hartland
- Coordinates: 48°23′58″N 101°49′14″W
- Country: United States
- State: North Dakota
- County: Ward
- Elevation: 2,080 ft (630 m)
- Time zone: Central (CST)
- GNIS feature ID: 1029326

Hartland is a ghost town in Ward County, North Dakota, United States. It is west of Carpio and north of Berthold.

Hartland was a small village established in 1907 in Sec. 30 of Carpio Township. A local resident, Martin D. Johnson is credited with naming the village for his birthplace, Hartland Township in Worth County, Iowa. Buildings in the Village of Hartland in 1912 were a Machinery & Implement Building, Blacksmith Shop, Pool Hall, General Store, Bank, Hardware Store, Lumber Yard, M.D. Johnson home, Iver Canton Home. Livery & Feed Stable, later Vedvig Garage), Grocery Store & Post Office, Hotel, An Office, Zion Lutheran Church, One-Room School house", and several private homes.

The post office of Hartland was established on March 23, 1908. Ward County folklore says that the name was meant to show the town as the heart of the area. The peak population of 150 was claimed in 1920, but by 1940 the population was less than 100. Eventually, in 2000, the town had a population of less than 10. The post office closed May 6, 1966.

The grocery store building was moved from Foxholm, Ward County, North Dakota to Hartland. It was later turned into a residence and then moved to Berthold, North Dakota where it is still lived in.

The Zion Congregation of the Synod for Speaking Norwegian Evangelical Lutheran Church of America was organized March 1, 1903 at the homestead of Jens Erickson. Church building constructed in 1910 on a lot secured from M.D. Johnson. The last services were held in 1969. The church building moved to Kenmare Pioneer Park in 1972.
