= Ruthville, North Dakota =

- Census-designated place & Unincorporated community
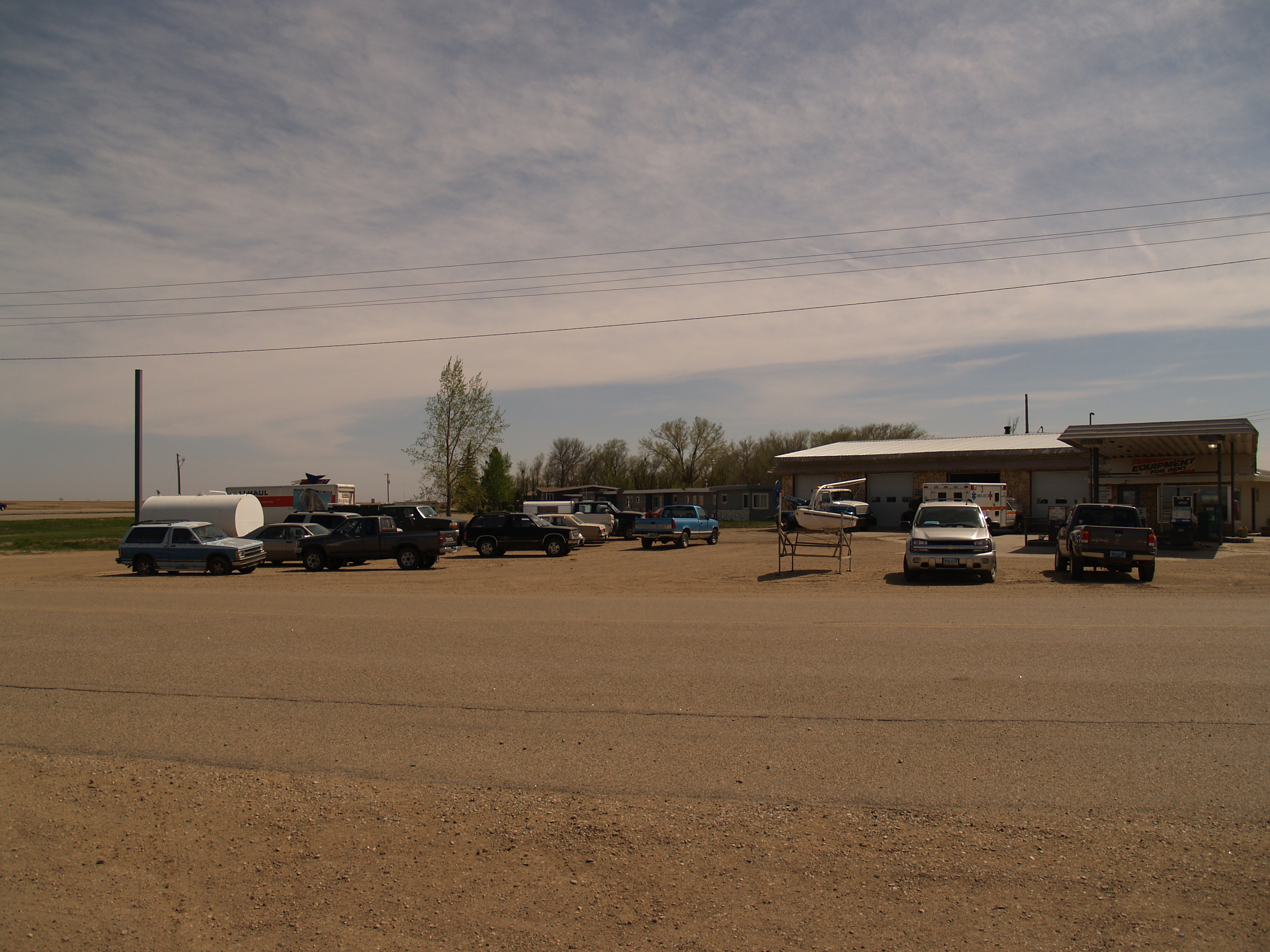
- Street in Ruthville

- Location within North Dakota
- Coordinates: 48°22′15″N 101°18′01″W
- Country: United States
- State: North Dakota
- County: Ward

Area
  - Total: 0.15 sq mi (0.40 km^{2})
  - Land: 0.15 sq mi (0.40 km^{2})
  - Water: 0 sq mi (0.00 km^{2})
- Elevation: 1,657 ft (505 m)

Population (2020)
  - Total: 151
  - Density: 990/sq mi (382/km^{2})
- Time zone: UTC-6 (Central (CST))
  - Summer (DST): UTC-5 (CDT)
- Area code: 701
- GNIS feature ID: 2584355

Ruthville is a census-designated place and unincorporated community in Ward County, North Dakota, United States. As of the 2020 census, Ruthville had a population of 151. The town was named after Ruth Mackenroth during the Depression, and consisted of a grocery Store, and gas station for area farmers.

== Demographics ==
Historical population
Census	Pop.	Note	%±
2020	151		—
U.S. Decennial Census
