= Harrison Township, Scotland County, Missouri =

Township in Scotland County, Missouri, U.S.

Coordinates: 40.3519°N 91.9958°W

Harrison Township is an inactive township in Scotland County, in the U.S. state of Missouri.

Harrison Township was erected in 1844, taking its name from President William Henry Harrison.
