= Sawyer, North Dakota =

- City
- Location of Sawyer, North Dakota
- Coordinates: 48°05′22″N 101°03′12″W
- Country: United States
- State: North Dakota
- County: Ward
- Founded: 1898

Area
  - Total: 0.49 sq mi (1.27 km^{2})
  - Land: 0.49 sq mi (1.27 km^{2})
  - Water: 0 sq mi (0.00 km^{2})
- Elevation: 1,535 ft (468 m)

Population (2020)
  - Total: 319
  - Estimate (2022): 312
  - Density: 650/sq mi (250.9/km^{2})
- Time zone: UTC-6 (Central (CST))
  - Summer (DST): UTC-5 (CDT)
- ZIP code: 58781
- Area code: 701
- FIPS code: 38-70980
- GNIS feature ID: 1036255
- Website: www.sawyernd58781.com

Sawyer is a city in Ward County, North Dakota, United States. The population was 319 at the 2020 census. It is part of the Minot Metropolitan Statistical Area. Sawyer was founded in 1898.

== Geography ==
According to the United States Census Bureau, the city has a total area of 0.48 square miles (1.24 km^{2}), all land.

== Demographics ==
Renee's Corner Cafe, Sawyer, 1987

Historical population
Census	Pop.	Note	%±
1910	327		—
1920	241		−26.3%
1930	206		−14.5%
1940	271		31.6%
1950	264		−2.6%
1960	390		47.7%
1970	373		−4.4%
1980	417		11.8%
1990	319		−23.5%
2000	377		18.2%
2010	357		−5.3%
2020	319		−10.6%
2022 (est.)	312		−2.2%
U.S. Decennial Census; 2020 Census

=== 2010 census ===
As of the census of 2010, there were 357 people, 139 households, and 99 families residing in the city. The population density was 743.8 inhabitants per square mile (287.2/km^{2}). There were 150 housing units at an average density of 312.5 per square mile (120.7/km^{2}). The racial makeup of the city was 96.6% White, 0.3% African American, 1.1% Native American, 0.3% Asian, 0.3% from other races, and 1.4% from two or more races. Hispanic or Latino of any race were 0.8% of the population.

There were 139 households, of which 35.3% had children under the age of 18 living with them, 58.3% were married couples living together, 8.6% had a female householder with no husband present, 4.3% had a male householder with no wife present, and 28.8% were non-families. 24.5% of all households were made up of individuals, and 10.8% had someone living alone who was 65 years of age or older. The average household size was 2.57 and the average family size was 3.05.

The median age in the city was 38.4 years. 28% of residents were under the age of 18; 7.1% were between the ages of 18 and 24; 25.5% were from 25 to 44; 27.8% were from 45 to 64; and 11.8% were 65 years of age or older. The gender makeup of the city was 52.4% male and 47.6% female.

=== 2000 census ===
As of the census of 2000, there were 377 people, 150 households, and 108 families residing in the city. The population density was 782.4 inhabitants per square mile (302.1/km^{2}). There were 162 housing units at an average density of 336.2 per square mile (129.8/km^{2}). The racial makeup of the city was 98.14% White, 0.53% Native American, 1.06% Asian, 0.27% from other races. Hispanic or Latino of any race were 1.06% of the population.

There were 150 households, out of which 35.3% had children under the age of 18 living with them, 60.0% were married couples living together, 8.7% had a female householder with no husband present, and 28.0% were non-families. 24.7% of all households were made up of individuals, and 10.0% had someone living alone who was 65 years of age or older. The average household size was 2.51 and the average family size was 2.98.

In the city, the population was spread out, with 29.4% under the age of 18, 5.8% from 18 to 24, 30.8% from 25 to 44, 22.3% from 45 to 64, and 11.7% who were 65 years of age or older. The median age was 36 years. For every 100 females, there were 107.1 males. For every 100 females age 18 and over, there were 107.8 males.

The median income for a household in the city was $30,750, and the median income for a family was $35,000. Males had a median income of $30,417 versus $14,750 for females. The per capita income for the city was $13,245. About 6.9% of families and 8.0% of the population were below the poverty line, including 6.7% of those under age 18 and none of those age 65 or over.
