= Donnybrook, North Dakota =

- City
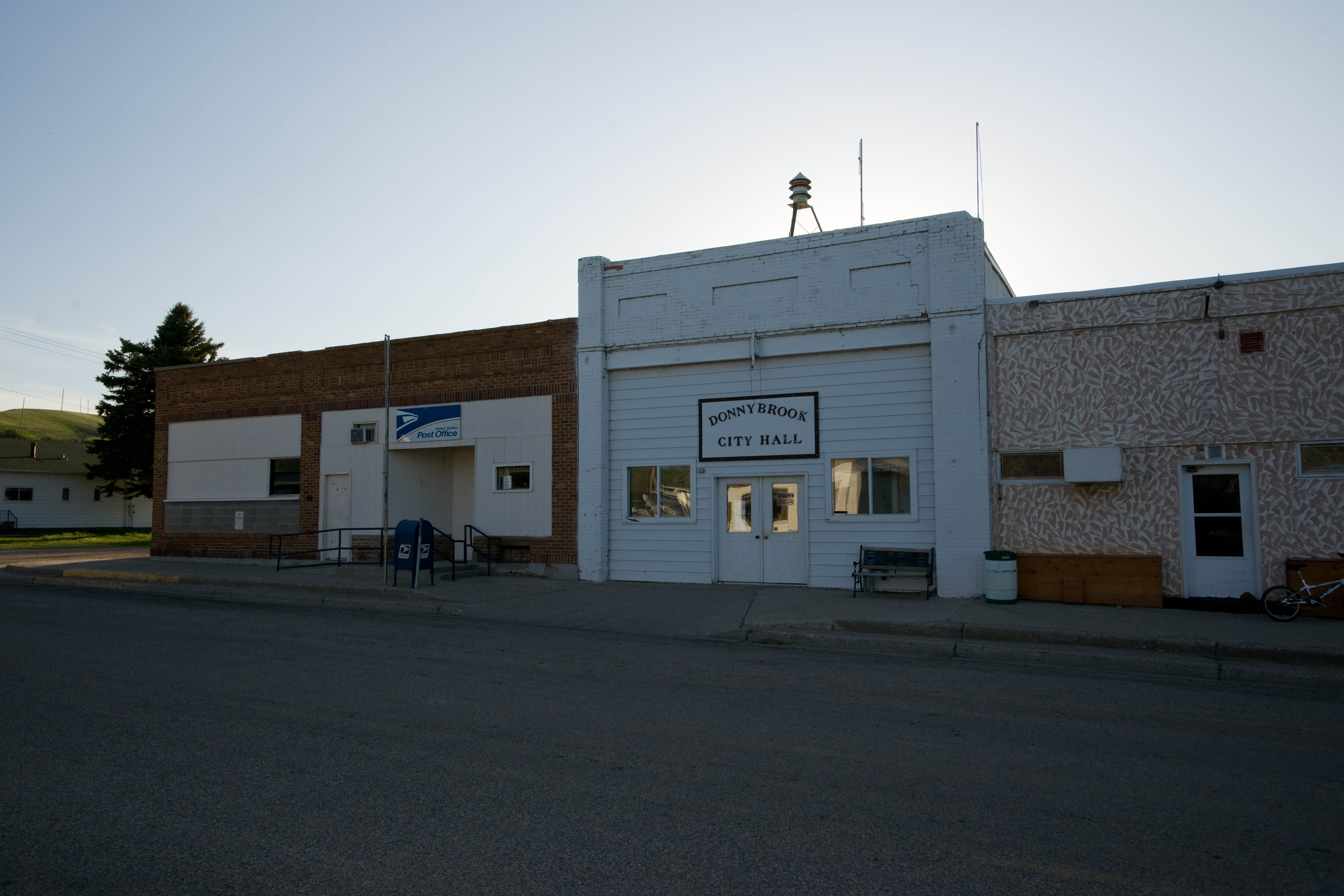
- The post office and city hall

- Logo

- Location of Donnybrook, North Dakota
- Coordinates: 48°30′27″N 101°53′13″W
- Country: United States
- State: North Dakota
- County: Ward
- Founded: 1895

Area
  - Total: 0.68 sq mi (1.77 km^{2})
  - Land: 0.68 sq mi (1.77 km^{2})
  - Water: 0 sq mi (0.00 km^{2})
- Elevation: 1,791 ft (546 m)

Population (2020)
  - Total: 75
  - Estimate (2022): 74
  - Density: 110.0/sq mi (42.49/km^{2})
- Time zone: UTC-6 (Central (CST))
  - Summer (DST): UTC-5 (CDT)
- ZIP code: 58734
- Area code: 701
- FIPS code: 38-19900
- GNIS feature ID: 1035995

Donnybrook is a city in Ward County, North Dakota, United States. The population was 75 at the 2020 census. It is part of the Minot Micropolitan Statistical Area.

The first place named Donnybrook was founded in 1895 and named after Donnybrook Fair in Ireland. In 1897, the postmaster of this site changed the name to Goetz. The name Donnybrook was then reused in 1898 when a new town formed to the west of Goetz along the main line of the Soo Line Railroad.

== Geography ==
According to the United States Census Bureau, the city has a total area of 0.70 square miles (1.81 km^{2}), all land.

== Demographics ==
Historical population
Census	Pop.	Note	%±
1910	297		—
1920	267		−10.1%
1930	259		−3.0%
1940	215		−17.0%
1950	207		−3.7%
1960	196		−5.3%
1970	163		−16.8%
1980	139		−14.7%
1990	106		−23.7%
2000	90		−15.1%
2010	59		−34.4%
2020	75		27.1%
2022 (est.)	74		−1.3%
U.S. Decennial Census; 2020 Census

=== 2010 census ===
As of the census of 2010, there were 59 people, 29 households, and 18 families residing in the city. The population density was 84.3 inhabitants per square mile (32.5/km^{2}). There were 37 housing units at an average density of 52.9 per square mile (20.4/km^{2}). The racial makeup of the city was 96.6% White and 3.4% from two or more races.

There were 29 households, of which 17.2% had children under the age of 18 living with them, 55.2% were married couples living together, 6.9% had a female householder with no husband present, and 37.9% were non-families. 34.5% of all households were made up of individuals, and 17.2% had someone living alone who was 65 years of age or older. The average household size was 2.03 and the average family size was 2.50.

The median age in the city was 51.9 years. 15.3% of residents were under the age of 18; 5.1% were between the ages of 18 and 24; 17% were from 25 to 44; 44.1% were from 45 to 64; and 18.6% were 65 years of age or older. The gender makeup of the city was 47.5% male and 52.5% female.

=== 2000 census ===
As of the census of 2000, there were 90 people, 36 households, and 28 families residing in the city. The population density was 128.5 inhabitants per square mile (49.6/km^{2}). There were 46 housing units at an average density of 65.7 per square mile (25.4/km^{2}). The racial makeup of the city was 95.56% White, 4.44% from other races. Hispanic or Latino of any race were 6.67% of the population.

There were 36 households, out of which 36.1% had children under the age of 18 living with them, 69.4% were married couples living together, 2.8% had a female householder with no husband present, and 22.2% were non-families. 22.2% of all households were made up of individuals, and 13.9% had someone living alone who was 65 years of age or older. The average household size was 2.50 and the average family size was 2.93.

In the city, the population was spread out, with 25.6% under the age of 18, 5.6% from 18 to 24, 20.0% from 25 to 44, 32.2% from 45 to 64, and 16.7% who were 65 years of age or older. The median age was 44 years. For every 100 females, there were 100.0 males. For every 100 females age 18 and over, there were 116.1 males.

The median income for a household in the city was $32,500, and the median income for a family was $31,250. Males had a median income of $28,750 versus $17,500 for females. The per capita income for the city was $14,599. There were 8.3% of families and 10.1% of the population living below the poverty line, including none under 18 and 25.0% of those over 64.
