= Harrison Township, Moniteau County, Missouri =

Inactive township in the American state of Missouri

Coordinates: 38.4811°N 92.6006°W

Harrison Township is an inactive township in Moniteau County, in the U.S. state of Missouri.

Harrison Township was established in 1845, and most likely was named after a pioneer citizen.
