= Rice Lake (Ward County, North Dakota) =

Lake in the state of North Dakota, United States

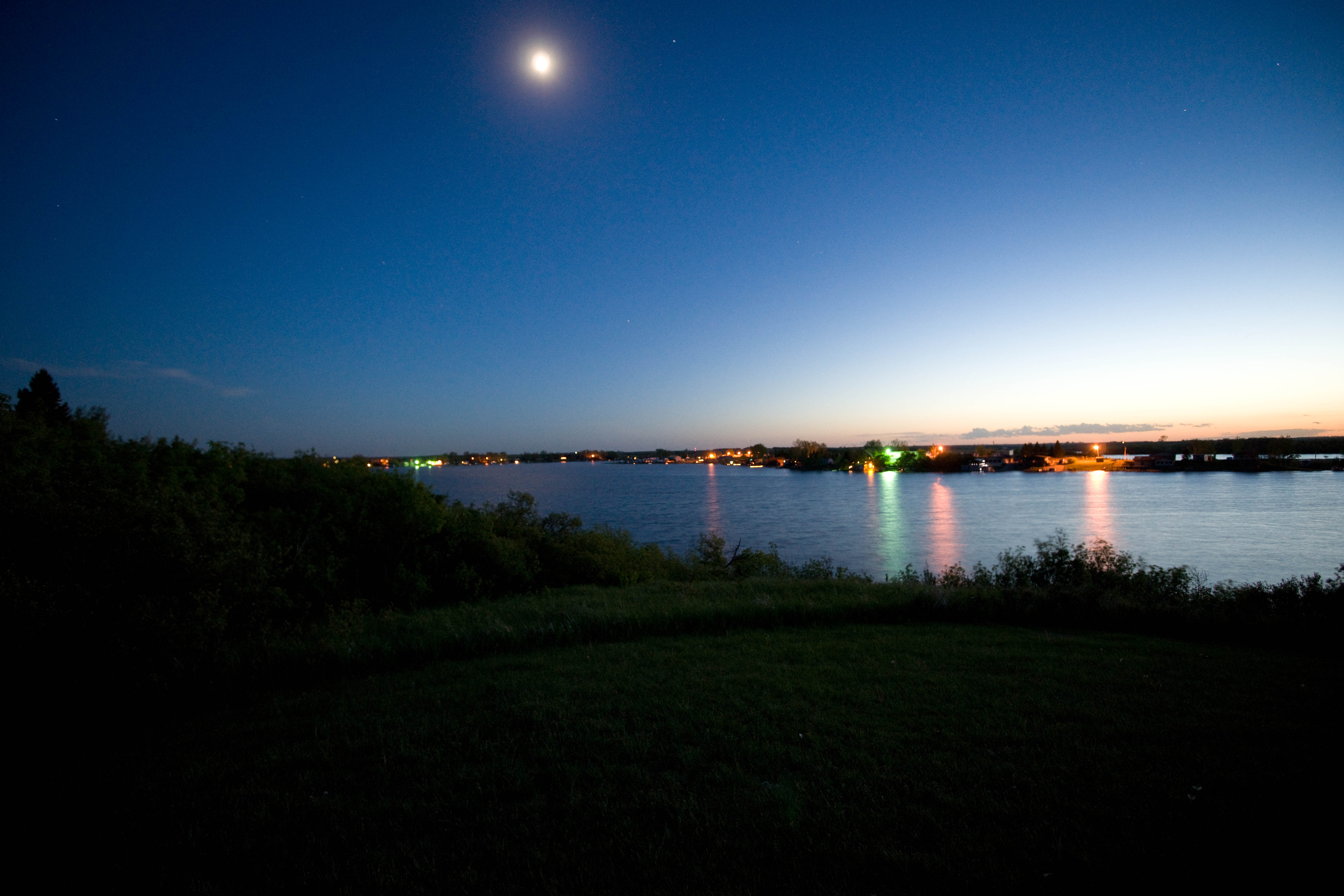
- View from Rice Lake Park

- Location in North Dakota
- Location: Ward County, North Dakota, United States
- Coordinates: 48°00′30″N 101°32′04″W
- Type: Lake
- Basin countries: United States
- Max. length: 1.33 miles (2.14 km)
- Surface area: 220 acres (89 ha)
- Average depth: 8.9 feet (2.7 m)
- Max. depth: 33.5 feet (10.2 m)
- Water volume: 1,640.5 acre-feet (2,023,500 m^{3})
- Shore length^{1}: 4.5 miles (7.2 km)
- Surface elevation: 2,034 ft (620 m)
- ^{1} Shore length is not a well-defined measure.

Rice Lake is an irregularly shaped body of water located 17 miles (27 km) southwest of Minot in Ward County, North Dakota.

The lake covers 220 acres (89 ha), has 4.5 miles (7.2 km) of shoreline, and an average depth of 8.9 feet (2.7 m), with a maximum depth of 33.5 feet (10.2 m).

Rice Lake Park occupies the eastern shore of the lake.
