= Harrison Township, Hall County, Nebraska =

Coordinates: 40°55′01″N 98°33′02″W

Harrison Township is a township in Hall County, Nebraska, in the United States.

== History ==
It was organized in 1881.
