= Des Lacs, North Dakota =

- City
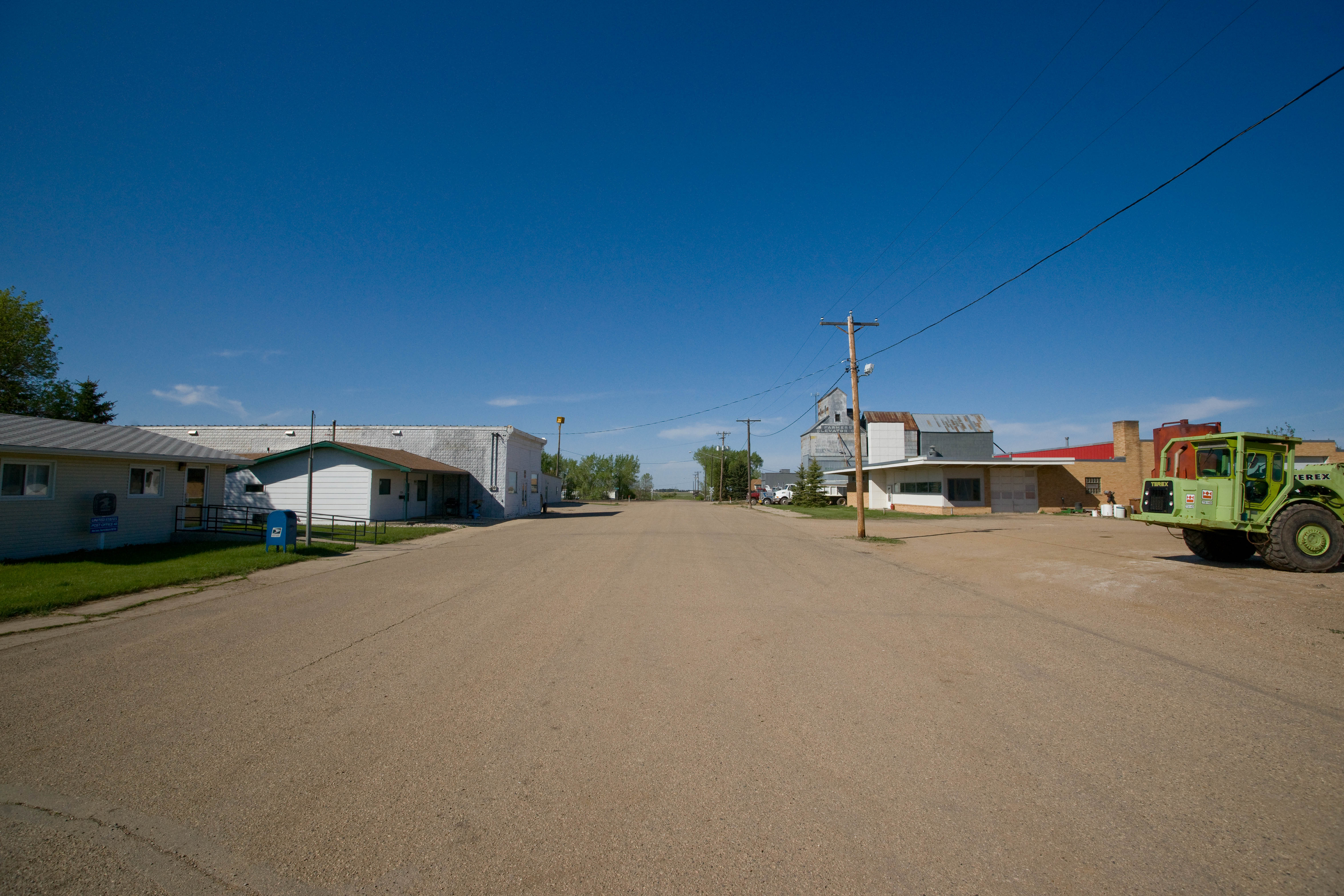
- Des Lacs, North Dakota

- Location of Des Lacs, North Dakota
- Coordinates: 48°15′23″N 101°33′49″W
- Country: United States
- State: North Dakota
- County: Ward
- Founded: 1888

Government
  - Mayor: Ryan Davy

Area
  - Total: 0.56 sq mi (1.46 km^{2})
  - Land: 0.54 sq mi (1.39 km^{2})
  - Water: 0.027 sq mi (0.07 km^{2})
- Elevation: 1,940 ft (590 m)

Population (2020)
  - Total: 185
  - Estimate (2022): 184
  - Density: 344.1/sq mi (132.84/km^{2})
- Time zone: UTC-6 (Central (CST))
  - Summer (DST): UTC-5 (CDT)
- ZIP code: 58733
- Area code: 701
- FIPS code: 38-19300
- GNIS feature ID: 1035988
- Website: www.cityofdeslacs.com

Des Lacs is a city in Ward County, North Dakota, United States. The population was 185 at the 2020 census. It is part of the Minot Metropolitan Statistical Area. Des Lacs was founded in 1888, named after the Riviere de Lacs (now Des Lacs River), from the French for "River [of] The Lakes."

== Geography ==
According to the United States Census Bureau, the city has a total area of 0.56 square miles (1.45 km^{2}), of which 0.53 square miles (1.37 km^{2}) is land and 0.03 square miles (0.08 km^{2}) is water.

== Demographics ==
Historical population
Census	Pop.	Note	%±
1920	188		—
1930	205		9.0%
1940	197		−3.9%
1950	180		−8.6%
1960	185		2.8%
1970	197		6.5%
1980	212		7.6%
1990	216		1.9%
2000	209		−3.2%
2010	204		−2.4%
2020	185		−9.3%
2022 (est.)	184		−0.5%
U.S. Decennial Census; 2020 Census

=== 2010 census ===
As of the census of 2010, there were 204 people, 78 households, and 62 families residing in the city. The population density was 384.9 inhabitants per square mile (148.6/km^{2}). There were 78 housing units at an average density of 147.2 per square mile (56.8/km^{2}). The racial makeup of the city was 96.6% White, 2.0% Native American, and 1.5% from two or more races. Hispanic or Latino people of any race were 0.5% of the population.

There were 78 households, of which 32.1% had children under the age of 18 living with them, 69.2% were married couples living together, 2.6% had a female householder with no husband present, 7.7% had a male householder with no wife present, and 20.5% were non-families. 15.4% of all households were made up of individuals, and 5.1% had someone living alone who was 65 years of age or older. The average household size was 2.62 and the average family size was 2.92.

The median age in the city was 40 years. 25.5% of residents were under the age of 18; 4.4% were between the ages of 18 and 24; 23.5% were from 25 to 44; 32.4% were from 45 to 64; and 14.2% were 65 years of age or older. The gender makeup of the city was 50.5% male and 49.5% female.

=== 2000 census ===
As of the census of 2000, there were 209 people, 75 households, and 63 families residing in the city. The population density was 390.1 inhabitants per square mile (150.6/km^{2}). There were 76 housing units at an average density of 141.9 per square mile (54.8/km^{2}). The racial makeup of the city was 99.04% White, 0.48% Native American, and 0.48% from two or more races. Hispanic or Latino people of any race were 0.96% of the population.

There were 75 households, out of which 36.0% had children under the age of 18 living with them, 72.0% were married couples living together, 6.7% had a female householder with no husband present, and 16.0% were non-families. 14.7% of all households were made up of individuals, and 6.7% had someone living alone who was 65 years of age or older. The average household size was 2.79 and the average family size was 3.06.

In the city, the population was spread out, with 27.3% under the age of 18, 7.7% from 18 to 24, 30.6% from 25 to 44, 24.9% from 45 to 64, and 9.6% who were 65 years of age or older. The median age was 37 years. For every 100 females, there were 109.0 males. For every 100 females age 18 and over, there were 114.1 males.

The median income for a household in the city was $36,250, and the median income for a family was $36,875. Males had a median income of $22,125 versus $15,000 for females. The per capita income for the city was $12,369. About 6.2% of families and 8.4% of the population were below the poverty line, including 12.5% of those under the age of 18 and none of those 65 or over.

== Transportation ==
Amtrak's Empire Builder, which operates between Seattle/Portland and Chicago, passes through the town on BNSF tracks, but makes no stop. The nearest station is located in Minot, 14 miles (23 km) to the east.

== Education ==
Des Lacs shares its school system with Burlington. Students in grades kindergarten through six attend school in Burlington, where the elementary school is located, while those in grades seven through twelve attend in Des Lacs at Des Lacs-Burlington High School. The district is United Public School District 7. Des Lacs students meet at the high school to ride their buses to school. Burlington students meet at the elementary school to ride their buses to school.
