= Makoti, North Dakota =

- City
- Nickname: Baseball City, USA
- Motto: "Best in the West"
- Location of Makoti, North Dakota
- Coordinates: 47°57′48″N 101°48′10″W
- Country: United States
- State: North Dakota
- County: Ward
- Founded: 1911

Area
  - Total: 0.54 sq mi (1.40 km^{2})
  - Land: 0.54 sq mi (1.40 km^{2})
  - Water: 0 sq mi (0.00 km^{2})
- Elevation: 2,077 ft (633 m)

Population (2020)
  - Total: 148
  - Estimate (2024): 146
  - Density: 274.2/sq mi (105.86/km^{2})
- Time zone: UTC–6 (Central (CST))
  - Summer (DST): UTC–5 (CDT)
- ZIP Code: 58756
- Area code: 701
- FIPS code: 38-49820
- GNIS feature ID: 1036145

Makoti is a city in Ward County, North Dakota, United States. The population was 148 at the 2020 census. It is part of the Minot Micropolitan Statistical Area. Makoti was founded in 1911.

== Geography ==
According to the United States Census Bureau, the city has a total area of 0.20 square miles (0.52 km^{2}), all land.

== Demographics ==
Historical population
| Census | Pop. | Note | %± |
|---|---|---|---|
| 1920 | 283 | | — |
| 1930 | 276 | | −2.5% |
| 1940 | 212 | | −23.2% |
| 1950 | 219 | | 3.3% |
| 1960 | 214 | | −2.3% |
| 1970 | 159 | | −25.7% |
| 1980 | 199 | | 25.2% |
| 1990 | 145 | | −27.1% |
| 2000 | 145 | | 0.0% |
| 2010 | 154 | | 6.2% |
| 2020 | 148 | | −3.9% |
| 2024 (est.) | 146 | | −1.4% |
U.S. Decennial Census; 2020 Census

=== 2010 census ===
As of the 2010 census, there were 154 people, 71 households, and 38 families residing in the city. The population density was 770.0 inhabitants per square mile (297.3/km^{2}). There were 87 housing units at an average density of 435.0 per square mile (168.0/km^{2}). The racial makeup of the city was 95.5% White, 0.6% from other races, and 3.9% from two or more races. Hispanic or Latino of any race were 1.3% of the population.

There were 71 households, of which 21.1% had children under the age of 18 living with them, 43.7% were married couples living together, 2.8% had a female householder with no husband present, 7.0% had a male householder with no wife present, and 46.5% were non-families. 43.7% of all households were made up of individuals, and 18.4% had someone living alone who was 65 years of age or older. The average household size was 2.17 and the average family size was 3.11.

The median age in the city was 47.5 years. 24% of residents were under the age of 18; 3.9% were between the ages of 18 and 24; 18.1% were from 25 to 44; 30.4% were from 45 to 64; and 23.4% were 65 years of age or older. The gender makeup of the city was 53.2% male and 46.8% female.

=== 2000 census ===
As of the 2000 census, there were 145 people, 74 households, and 35 families residing in the city. The population density was 733.3 inhabitants per square mile (283.1/km^{2}). There were 89 housing units at an average density of 450.1 per square mile (173.8/km^{2}). The racial makeup of the city was 95.86% White, 2.76% from other races, and 1.38% from two or more races.

There were 74 households, out of which 18.9% had children under the age of 18 living with them, 43.2% were married couples living together, 1.4% had a female householder with no husband present, and 52.7% were non-families. 48.6% of all households were made up of individuals, and 18.9% had someone living alone who was 65 years of age or older. The average household size was 1.96 and the average family size was 2.94.

In the city, the population was spread out, with 21.4% under the age of 18, 3.4% from 18 to 24, 20.7% from 25 to 44, 31.7% from 45 to 64, and 22.8% who were 65 years of age or older. The median age was 47 years. For every 100 females, there were 93.3 males. For every 100 females age 18 and over, there were 103.6 males.

The median income for a household in the city was $30,000, and the median income for a family was $39,688. Males had a median income of $28,438 versus $23,750 for females. The per capita income for the city was $16,703. There were 10.3% of families and 19.0% of the population living below the poverty line, including 39.3% of under eighteens and 3.8% of those over 64.

== Education ==
It is within the Lewis and Clark School District, which formed in 2003 when three school districts merged, including the North Shore School District, which was based in Makoti.
