= Douglas, North Dakota =

Douglas
- City
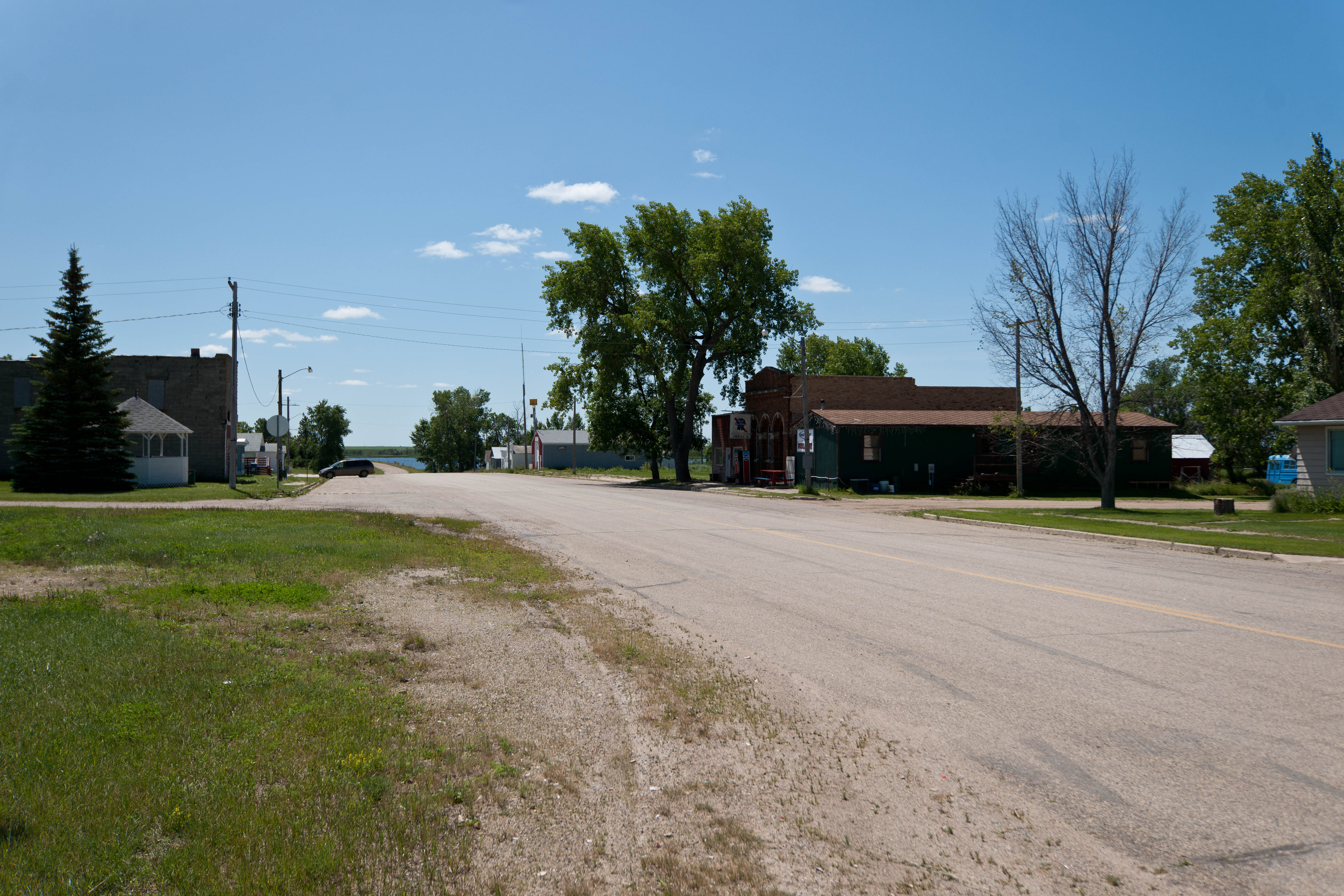
- Street in Douglas

- Location of Douglas, North Dakota
- Coordinates: 47°51′28″N 101°30′06″W
- Country: United States
- State: North Dakota
- County: Ward
- Founded: 1906

Area
  - Total: 0.31 sq mi (0.80 km^{2})
  - Land: 0.29 sq mi (0.74 km^{2})
  - Water: 0.023 sq mi (0.06 km^{2})
- Elevation: 2,057 ft (627 m)

Population (2020)
  - Total: 93
  - Estimate (2022): 91
  - Density: 327.7/sq mi (126.52/km^{2})
- Time zone: UTC-6 (Central (CST))
  - Summer (DST): UTC-5 (CDT)
- ZIP code: 58735
- Area code: 701
- FIPS code: 38-20020
- GNIS feature ID: 1035996
- Website: douglasnd.com

Douglas is a city in Ward County, North Dakota, United States. The population was 93 at the 2020 census. It is part of the Minot Micropolitan Statistical Area. Douglas was founded in 1906.

In the late 1990s and early 2000s, multiple business buildings on Main Street were demolished. Between 2005 and 2009, the school was razed for an unknown reason. Today, the town is a shell of its former self, with a bar being the only business left in operation.

== Geography ==
According to the United States Census Bureau, the city has a total area of 0.31 square miles (0.80 km^{2}), of which 0.29 square miles (0.75 km^{2}) is land and 0.02 square miles (0.05 km^{2}) is water.

== Demographics ==
Historical population
Census	Pop.	Note	%±
1910	171		—
1920	284		66.1%
1930	288		1.4%
1940	313		8.7%
1950	236		−24.6%
1960	210		−11.0%
1970	144		−31.4%
1980	112		−22.2%
1990	93		−17.0%
2000	64		−31.2%
2010	64		0.0%
2020	93		45.3%
2022 (est.)	91		−2.2%
U.S. Decennial Census; 2020 Census

=== 2010 census ===
As of the census of 2010, there were 64 people, 28 households, and 19 families residing in the city. The population density was 220.7 inhabitants per square mile (85.2/km^{2}). There were 40 housing units at an average density of 137.9 per square mile (53.2/km^{2}). The racial makeup of the city was 95.3% White, 3.1% Native American, and 1.6% from two or more races. Hispanic or Latino of any race were 3.1% of the population.

There were 28 households, of which 32.1% had children under the age of 18 living with them, 57.1% were married couples living together, 7.1% had a female householder with no husband present, 3.6% had a male householder with no wife present, and 32.1% were non-families. 32.1% of all households were made up of individuals, and 10.7% had someone living alone who was 65 years of age or older. The average household size was 2.29 and the average family size was 2.89.

The median age in the city was 49.3 years. 26.6% of residents were under the age of 18; 3% were between the ages of 18 and 24; 17.2% were from 25 to 44; 37.6% were from 45 to 64; and 15.6% were 65 years of age or older. The gender makeup of the city was 42.2% male and 57.8% female.

=== 2000 census ===
As of the census of 2000, there were 64 people, 30 households, and 17 families residing in the city. The population density was 223.1 inhabitants per square mile (86.1/km^{2}). There were 44 housing units at an average density of 153.4 per square mile (59.2/km^{2}). The racial makeup of the city was 93.75% White and 6.25% Native American. Hispanic or Latino of any race were 3.12% of the population.

There were 30 households, out of which 16.7% had children under the age of 18 living with them, 46.7% were married couples living together, 10.0% had a female householder with no husband present, and 43.3% were non-families. 36.7% of all households were made up of individuals, and 20.0% had someone living alone who was 65 years of age or older. The average household size was 2.13 and the average family size was 2.59.

In the city, the population was spread out, with 17.2% under the age of 18, 7.8% from 18 to 24, 15.6% from 25 to 44, 40.6% from 45 to 64, and 18.8% who were 65 years of age or older. The median age was 49 years. For every 100 females, there were 68.4 males. For every 100 females age 18 and over, there were 76.7 males.

The median income for a household in the city was $23,125, and the median income for a family was $43,333. Males had a median income of $31,000 versus $14,444 for females. The per capita income for the city was $14,409. There were 7.1% of families and 13.0% of the population living below the poverty line, including 100.0% of under eighteens and none of those over 64.
