= Harrison Township, Knox County, Nebraska =

Harrison Township
- Township
- Location in Knox County
- Coordinates: 42°39′22″N 097°46′30″W
- Country: United States
- State: Nebraska
- County: Knox

Area
  - Total: 35.82 sq mi (92.78 km^{2})
  - Land: 35.82 sq mi (92.78 km^{2})
  - Water: 0 sq mi (0 km^{2}) 0%
- Elevation: 1,617 ft (493 m)

Population (2020)
  - Total: 74
  - Density: 2.1/sq mi (0.80/km^{2})
- GNIS feature ID: 0838049

Harrison Township is one of thirty townships in Knox County, Nebraska, United States. The population was 74 at the 2020 census. A 2023 estimate placed the township's population at 75.

== See also ==
- County government in Nebraska
