= Kenmare, North Dakota =

- City
- Logo
- Nickname: Kenmare Honkers
- Motto: "Real Life"
- Location of Kenmare, North Dakota
- Coordinates: 48°40′22″N 102°04′19″W
- Country: United States
- State: North Dakota
- County: Ward
- Founded: 1897

Government
  - Mayor: Arlen Gartner

Area
  - Total: 1.34 sq mi (3.47 km^{2})
  - Land: 1.34 sq mi (3.47 km^{2})
  - Water: 0 sq mi (0.00 km^{2})
- Elevation: 1,949 ft (594 m)

Population (2020)
  - Total: 961
  - Estimate (2022): 930
  - Density: 716.7/sq mi (276.72/km^{2})
- Time zone: UTC-6 (Central (CST))
  - Summer (DST): UTC-5 (CDT)
- ZIP code: 58746
- Area code: 701
- FIPS code: 38-42020
- GNIS feature ID: 1036104
- Highways: US 52, ND 28
- Website: kenmarend.com

Kenmare is a city in Ward County, North Dakota, United States. The population was 961 at the 2020 census. Kenmare is part of the Minot metropolitan area.

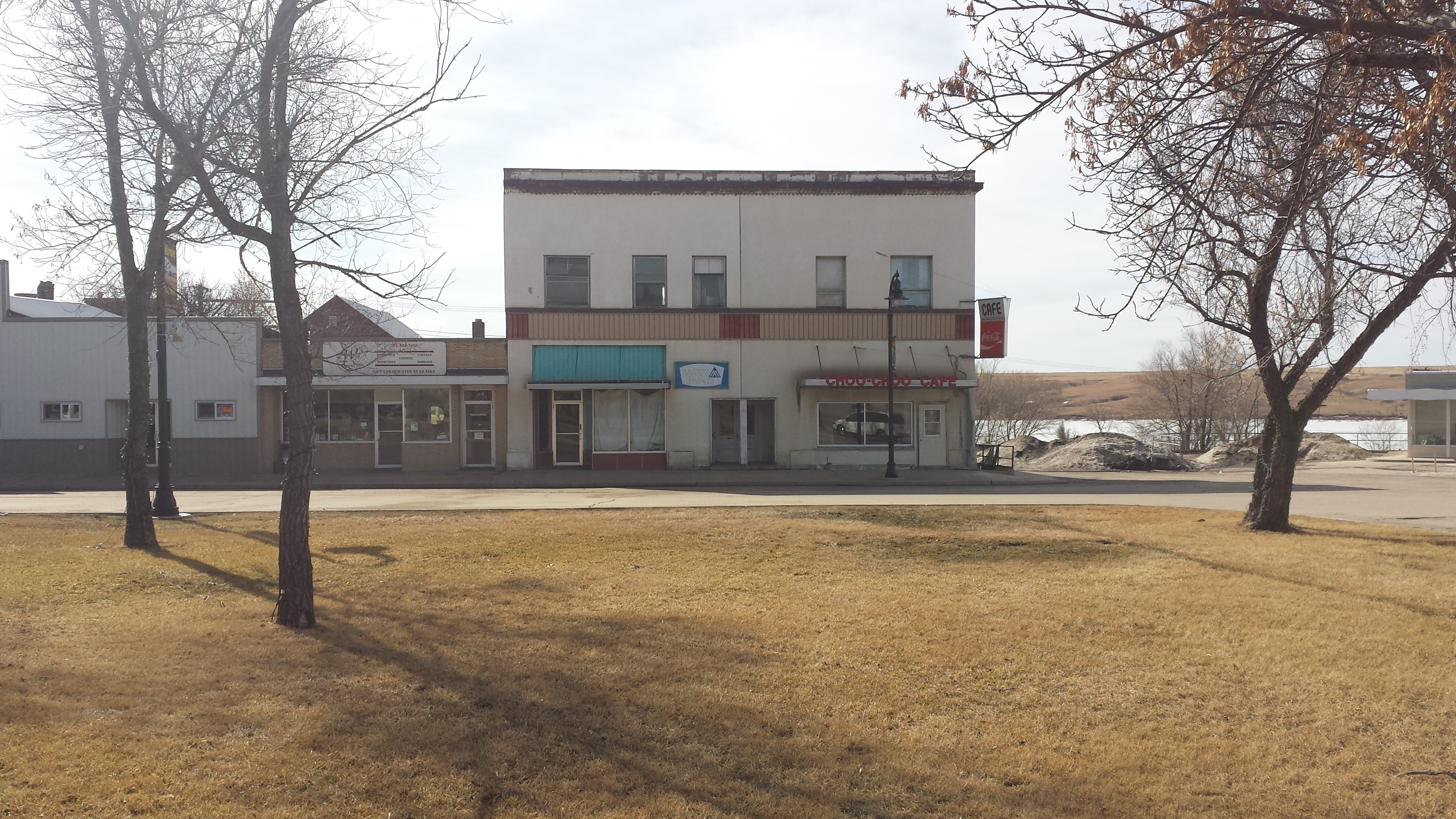
Downtown Kenmare

== History ==
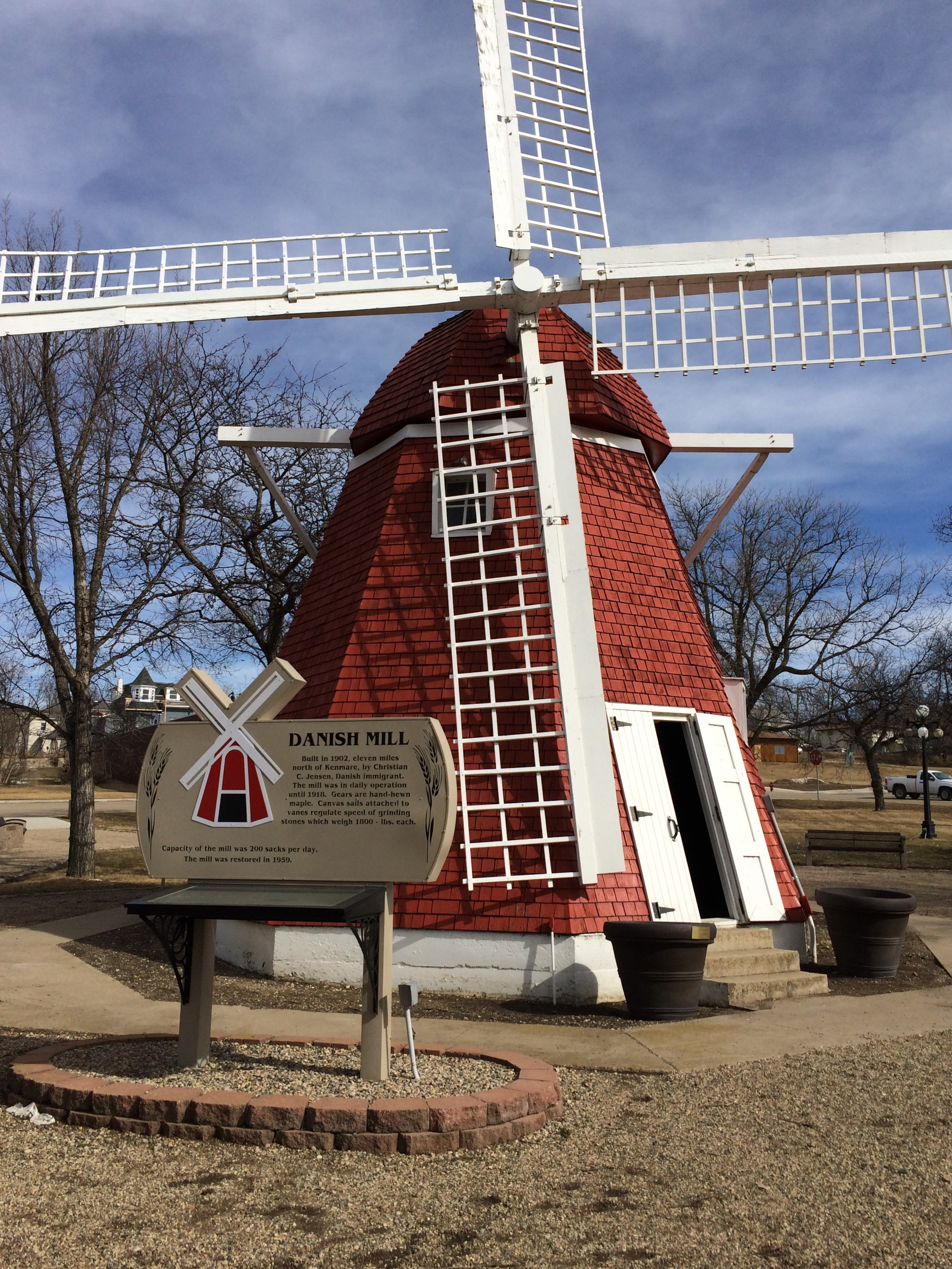
Danish Mill

Kenmare was platted in 1897. The city most likely was named after Kenmare, in Ireland.

== Geography ==
According to the United States Census Bureau, the city has a total area of 1.24 square miles (3.21 km^{2}), all land.

== Demographics ==
Historical population
Census	Pop.	Note	%±
1910	1,437		—
1920	1,446		0.6%
1930	1,494		3.3%
1940	1,528		2.3%
1950	1,712		12.0%
1960	1,696		−0.9%
1970	1,515		−10.7%
1980	1,456		−3.9%
1990	1,214		−16.6%
2000	1,081		−11.0%
2010	1,096		1.4%
2020	961		−12.3%
2022 (est.)	930		−3.2%
U.S. Decennial Census; 2020 Census

=== 2010 census ===
As of the census of 2010, there were 1,096 people, 480 households, and 281 families living in the city. The population density was 883.9 inhabitants per square mile (341.3/km^{2}). There were 558 housing units at an average density of 450.0 per square mile (173.7/km^{2}). The racial makeup of the city was 95.9% White, 0.2% African American, 0.6% Native American, 0.7% Asian, 1.2% from other races, and 1.4% from two or more races. Hispanic or Latino of any race were 2.6% of the population.

There were 480 households, of which 25.0% had children under the age of 18 living with them, 48.8% were married couples living together, 6.5% had a female householder with no husband present, 3.3% had a male householder with no wife present, and 41.5% were non-families. 36.7% of all households were made up of individuals, and 18.7% had someone living alone who was 65 years of age or older. The average household size was 2.18 and the average family size was 2.85.

The median age in the city was 46.7 years. 21.4% of residents were under the age of 18; 6.2% were between the ages of 18 and 24; 19.5% were from 25 to 44; 29.2% were from 45 to 64; and 23.6% were 65 years of age or older. The gender makeup of the city was 50.5% male and 49.5% female.

=== 2000 census ===
As of the census of 2000, there were 1,081 people, 468 households, and 278 families living in the city. The population density was 872.8 inhabitants per square mile (337.0/km^{2}). There were 553 housing units at an average density of 446.5 per square mile (172.4/km^{2}). The racial makeup of the city was 98.33% White, 0.56% Native American, 0.28% Asian, 0.09% from other races, and 0.74% from two or more races. Hispanic or Latino of any race were 0.19% of the population.

There were 468 households, out of which 23.3% had children under the age of 18 living with them, 50.6% were married couples living together, 6.0% had a female householder with no husband present, and 40.4% were non-families. 38.9% of all households were made up of individuals, and 22.4% had someone living alone who was 65 years of age or older. The average household size was 2.15 and the average family size was 2.85.

In the city, the population was spread out, with 19.9% under the age of 18, 5.2% from 18 to 24, 22.2% from 25 to 44, 22.0% from 45 to 64, and 30.7% who were 65 years of age or older. The median age was 47 years. For every 100 females, there were 93.0 males. For every 100 females age 18 and over, there were 85.0 males.

The median income for a household in the city was $30,057, and the median income for a family was $40,125. Males had a median income of $27,031 versus $17,826 for females. The per capita income for the city was $15,428. About 10.0% of families and 10.7% of the population were below the poverty line, including 11.1% of those under age 18 and 11.1% of those age 65 or over.

== Climate ==
This climatic region is typified by large seasonal temperature differences, with warm to hot (and often humid) summers and cold (sometimes severely cold) winters. According to the Köppen Climate Classification system, Kenmare has a humid continental climate, abbreviated "Dfb" on climate maps.

Climate data for Kenmare 1 WSW, North Dakota (1991–2020 normals, extremes 1933–present)
Month	Jan	Feb	Mar	Apr	May	Jun	Jul	Aug	Sep	Oct	Nov	Dec	Year
Record high °F (°C)	58 (14)	63 (17)	79 (26)	91 (33)	100 (38)	103 (39)	108 (42)	108 (42)	101 (38)	93 (34)	76 (24)	65 (18)	108 (42)
Mean daily maximum °F (°C)	18.8 (−7.3)	22.8 (−5.1)	35.6 (2.0)	52.1 (11.2)	65.3 (18.5)	74.0 (23.3)	79.9 (26.6)	80.0 (26.7)	69.0 (20.6)	52.4 (11.3)	35.3 (1.8)	22.6 (−5.2)	50.6 (10.3)
Daily mean °F (°C)	9.6 (−12.4)	13.1 (−10.5)	25.1 (−3.8)	39.9 (4.4)	53.1 (11.7)	62.6 (17.0)	67.7 (19.8)	66.4 (19.1)	56.1 (13.4)	41.5 (5.3)	26.1 (−3.3)	14.1 (−9.9)	39.6 (4.2)
Mean daily minimum °F (°C)	0.4 (−17.6)	3.5 (−15.8)	14.6 (−9.7)	27.7 (−2.4)	40.8 (4.9)	51.3 (10.7)	55.5 (13.1)	52.7 (11.5)	43.2 (6.2)	30.5 (−0.8)	16.9 (−8.4)	5.6 (−14.7)	28.6 (−1.9)
Record low °F (°C)	−41 (−41)	−41 (−41)	−38 (−39)	−12 (−24)	11 (−12)	30 (−1)	35 (2)	27 (−3)	16 (−9)	−2 (−19)	−27 (−33)	−40 (−40)	−41 (−41)
Average precipitation inches (mm)	1.00 (25)	0.73 (19)	0.89 (23)	0.96 (24)	2.50 (64)	3.38 (86)	2.99 (76)	2.19 (56)	1.92 (49)	1.25 (32)	0.79 (20)	0.89 (23)	19.49 (495)
Average precipitation days (≥ 0.01 in)	5.7	4.2	5.4	5.4	8.4	11.0	8.3	6.6	6.3	4.9	3.8	5.1	75.1
Source: NOAA
