= Berthold, North Dakota =

- City
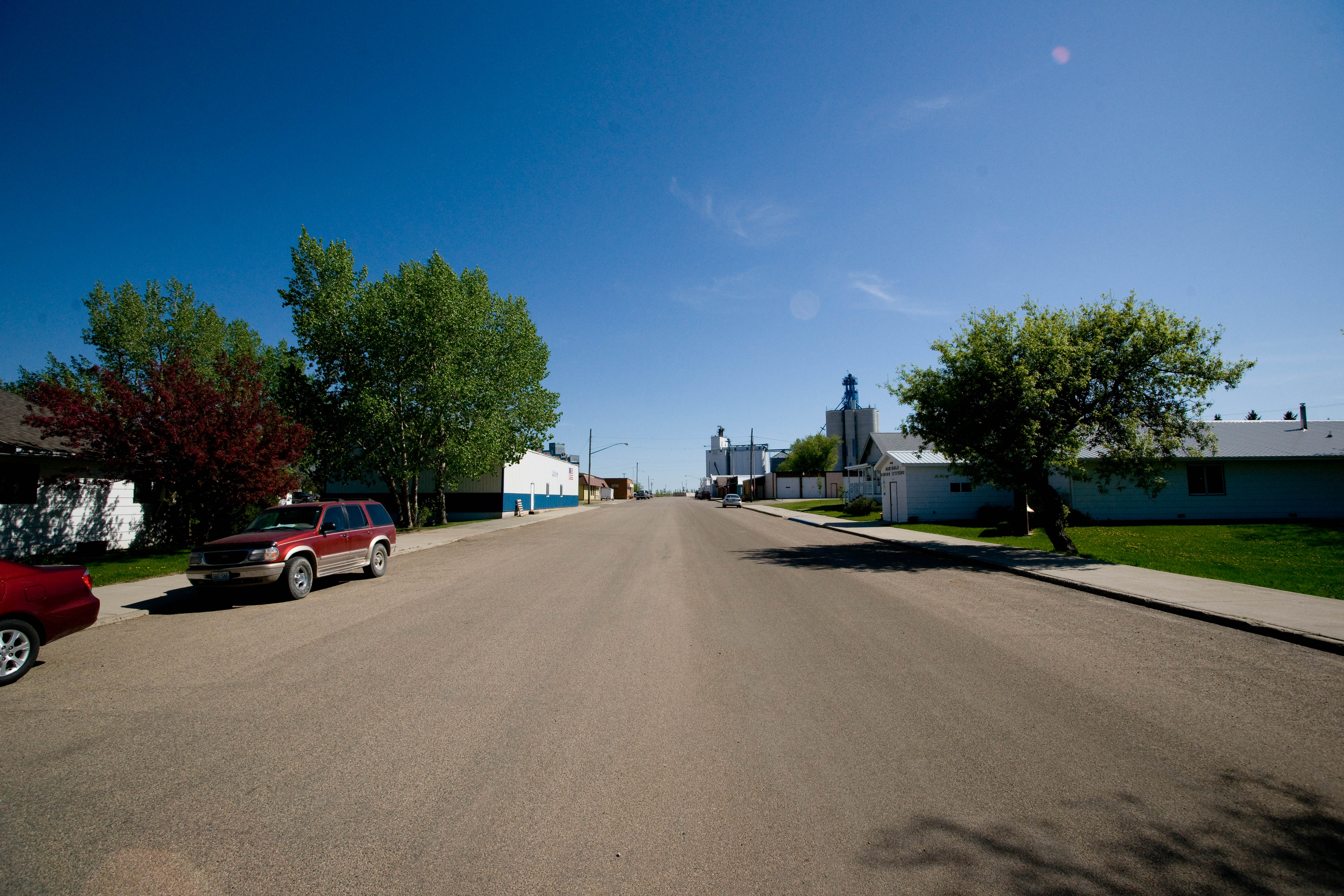
- Street in Berthold, North Dakota

- Seal
- Motto: "Life In Berthold Is All Ways Good"
- Location of Berthold, North Dakota
- Coordinates: 48°18′59″N 101°45′32″W
- Country: United States
- State: North Dakota
- County: Ward
- Founded: 1900

Government
  - Mayor: Steve Ibach

Area
  - Total: 1.19 sq mi (3.07 km^{2})
  - Land: 1.19 sq mi (3.07 km^{2})
  - Water: 0 sq mi (0.00 km^{2})
- Elevation: 2,100 ft (640 m)

Population (2020)
  - Total: 490
  - Estimate (2022): 473
  - Density: 413.5/sq mi (159.67/km^{2})
- Time zone: UTC-6 (Central (CST))
  - Summer (DST): UTC-5 (CDT)
- ZIP code: 58718
- Area code: 701
- FIPS code: 38-06460
- GNIS feature ID: 1035930
- Website: berthold-nd.gov

Berthold is a city in Ward County, North Dakota, United States. The population was 490 at the 2020 census.

== History ==
Berthold was founded in 1900.

== Geography ==
According to the United States Census Bureau, the town has a total area of 0.37 square miles (0.96 km^{2}), all land.

== Demographics ==
Historical population
Census	Pop.	Note	%±
1910	454		—
1920	498		9.7%
1930	511		2.6%
1940	428		−16.2%
1950	459		7.2%
1960	431		−6.1%
1970	398		−7.7%
1980	485		21.9%
1990	409		−15.7%
2000	466		13.9%
2010	454		−2.6%
2020	490		7.9%
2022 (est.)	473		−3.5%
U.S. Decennial Census; 2020 Census

Berthold is part of the Minot Metropolitan Statistical Area.

=== 2010 census ===
As of the census of 2010, there were 454 people in 166 households, including 120 families, in the town. The population density was 1,227.0 inhabitants per square mile (473.7/km^{2}). There were 178 housing units at an average density of 481.1 per square mile (185.8/km^{2}). The racial makup of the town was 98.7% White, 0.2% African American, and 1.1% from two or more races. Hispanic or Latino of any race were 1.8%.

Of the 166 households 37.3% had children under the age of 18 living with them, 63.3% were married couples living together, 5.4% had a female householder with no husband present, 3.6% had a male householder with no wife present, and 27.7% were non-families. 25.3% of households were one person and 9.6% were one person aged 65 or older. The average household size was 2.73 and the average family size was 3.31.

The median age was 37.2 years. 33.3% of residents were under the age of 18; 4.5% were between the ages of 18 and 24; 26% were from 25 to 44; 22.8% were from 45 to 64; and 13.2% were 65 or older. The gender makeup of the town was 52.2% male and 47.8% female.

=== 2000 census ===
As of the census of 2000, there were 466 people in 170 households, including 131 families, in the town. The population density was 1,214.7 inhabitants per square mile (469.0/km^{2}). There were 181 housing units at an average density of 471.8 per square mile (182.2/km^{2}). The racial makup of the town was 98.07% White, 0.21% African American, 0.21% Asian, 0.43% from other races, and 1.07% from two or more races. Hispanic or Latino of any race were 1.29% of the population.

Of the 170 households 40.6% had children under the age of 18 living with them, 69.4% were married couples living together, 5.3% had a female householder with no husband present, and 22.9% were non-families. 21.8% of households were one person and 14.1% were one person aged 65 or older. The average household size was 2.74 and the average family size was 3.21.

The age distribution was 31.8% under the age of 18, 4.5% from 18 to 24, 32.0% from 25 to 44, 16.5% from 45 to 64, and 15.2% 65 or older. The median age was 34 years. For every 100 females, there were 99.1 males. For every 100 females age 18 and over, there were 101.3 males.

The median household income was $35,000 and the median family income was $43,500. Males had a median income of $28,250 versus $20,000 for females. The per capita income for the town was $17,683. About 5.6% of families and 6.6% of the population were below the poverty line, including 6.8% of those under age 18 and 10.7% of those age 65 or over.

== Transportation ==
Amtrak's Empire Builder, which operates between Seattle/Portland and Chicago, passes through the town on BNSF tracks, but makes no stop. The nearest station is located in Minot, 24 miles (39 km) to the southeast.

== Education ==
It is within the Lewis and Clark School District, which formed in 2003 when the Berthold School District merged with two other school districts. There is one school, Berthold Public School.

Site of interest:

- Berthold Public School Arboretum

== See also ==
- List of oil pipelines
