= Des Lacs River =

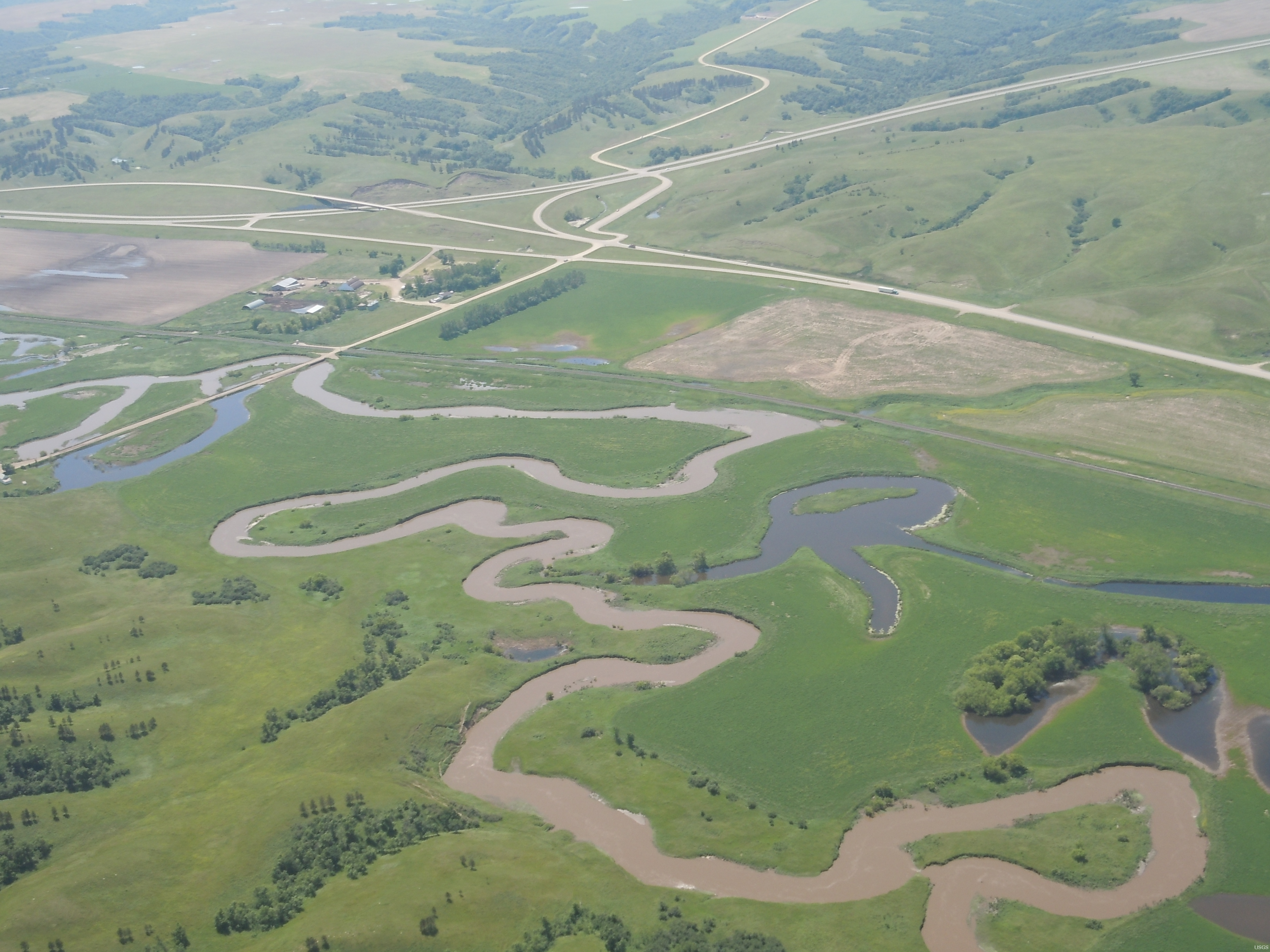
- The Des Lacs River in North Dakota.
- Etymology: From the French Riviere des Lacs, given by fur trappers and meaning River of the Lakes.

Location
- Country: United States, Canada
- Region: Saskatchewan, North Dakota
- Cities: Burlington, North Dakota, Kenmare, North Dakota

Physical characteristics
- Source
  - location: Southeastern Saskatchewan, Canada
  - coordinates: 48°35′25″N 101°59′49″W
- Mouth: Souris River
  - location: North Dakota, United States
  - coordinates: 48°16′47″N 101°25′08″W
  - elevation: 1,558 ft (475 m)

Basin features
- River system: Souris River basin

The Des Lacs River is a river in central North America which flows through Saskatchewan and North Dakota. It originates in southeastern Saskatchewan and joins the Souris River, of which it is the primary tributary, in Burlington, North Dakota.

== Natural history ==
The Des Lacs River was formed by catastrophic meltwater release from two large glacial lakes about 10,000 years ago.

The Des Lacs river is perennial, exhibiting many old oxbow lakes, meander scars, and relict channels. Prior to settlement, numerous riverine wetlands, ponds, and marshes were maintained by periodic flooding. With settlement of the region, the Des Lac river was significantly modified by drainage and channelization, and by construction of many low head dams along the river. Because of these changes, few natural riverine wetlands remain.

== History ==
Ethnographic accounts indicate that the Assiniboine, Sioux, Mandan, Hidatsa, Plains Ojibwa, and Atsina peoples all made use of the region for hunting or trade route purposes, though few archaeological sites have been formally identified. Historical records indicate that southern Assiniboine tribes were the last inhabitants of the Des Lacs River valley prior to Euro-American settlement.

Early settlers came to the region in the early 1880s and consisted of ranchers claiming land in the valley for cattle and forage production. A Lignite coal mine had been established at the mouth of the river by 1880. Accessibility to the region was increased with extensions of Great Northern Railway in 1886 and the Soo Line in 1893. After 1896 settlement of the valley began in earnest and town sites were established. During this period the Des Lacs River was briefly used to transport grain by barge to Kenmare, North Dakota, where it was unloaded and shipped on the Soo Line.

== See also ==
- List of rivers of Saskatchewan
- List of rivers of North Dakota
