= Ryder, North Dakota =

- City
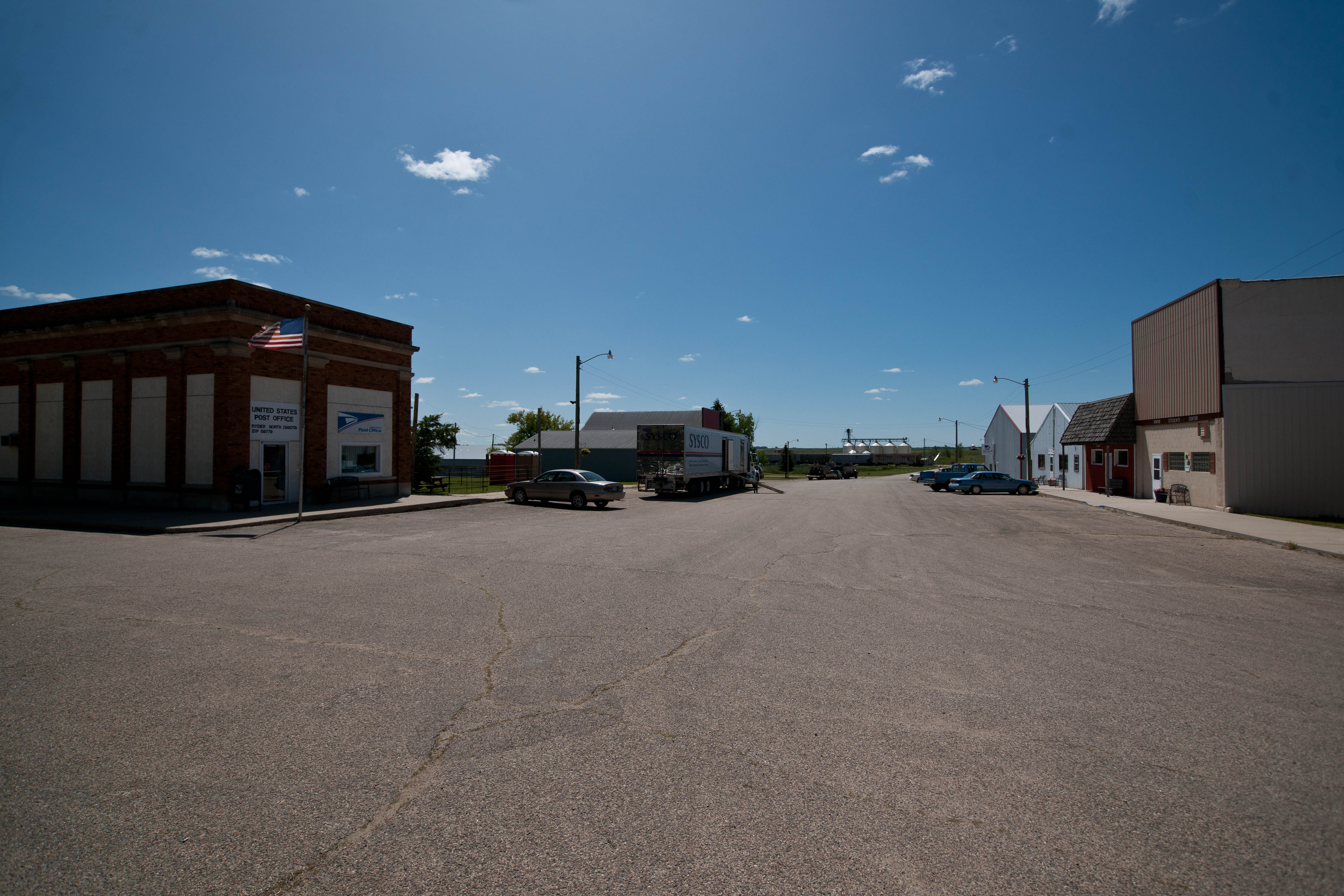
- Business district of Ryder

- Location of Ryder, North Dakota
- Coordinates: 47°55′16″N 101°40′10″W
- Country: United States
- State: North Dakota
- County: Ward
- Founded: 1906

Area
  - Total: 0.681 sq mi (1.764 km^{2})
  - Land: 0.524 sq mi (1.358 km^{2})
  - Water: 0.157 sq mi (0.407 km^{2})
- Elevation: 2,100 ft (640 m)

Population (2020)
  - Total: 108
  - Estimate (2023): 103
  - Density: 206.0/sq mi (79.54/km^{2})
- Time zone: UTC–6 (Central (CST))
  - Summer (DST): UTC–5 (CDT)
- ZIP Code: 58779
- Area code: 701
- FIPS code: 38-69460
- GNIS feature ID: 1036250

Ryder is a city in Ward County, North Dakota, United States. The population was 108 at the 2020 census. It is part of the Minot Micropolitan Statistical Area. Ryder was founded in 1906.

== History ==
North Dakota's first oil strike occurred in Ryder in 1908 when oil began seeping into a water well dug by meat market proprietor Joe Wustner in 1906. Wustner kept quiet about his discovery and used the substance to fuel his kerosene lamps. Finally in 1909 he admitted publicly that he had struck oil.

== Geography ==
According to the United States Census Bureau, the city has a total area of 0.681 square miles (1.76 km^{2}), of which 0.524 square miles (1.36 km^{2}) is land and 0.157 square miles (0.41 km^{2}) is water.

== Demographics ==
Historical population
Census	Pop.	Note	%±
1910	338		—
1920	483		42.9%
1930	457		−5.4%
1940	467		2.2%
1950	330		−29.3%
1960	264		−20.0%
1970	211		−20.1%
1980	158		−25.1%
1990	121		−23.4%
2000	92		−24.0%
2010	85		−7.6%
2020	108		27.1%
2023 (est.)	103		−4.6%
U.S. Decennial Census; 2020 Census

=== 2010 census ===
As of the 2010 census, there were 85 people, 42 households, and 22 families residing in the city. The population density was 257.6 inhabitants per square mile (99.5/km^{2}). There were 62 housing units at an average density of 187.9 per square mile (72.5/km^{2}). The racial makeup of the city was 96.5% White and 3.5% Native American.

There were 42 households, of which 26.2% had children under the age of 18 living with them, 42.9% were married couples living together, 2.4% had a female householder with no husband present, 7.1% had a male householder with no wife present, and 47.6% were non-families. 47.6% of all households were made up of individuals, and 23.8% had someone living alone who was 65 years of age or older. The average household size was 2.02 and the average family size was 2.82.

The median age in the city was 48.5 years. 18.8% of residents were under the age of 18; 6% were between the ages of 18 and 24; 21.2% were from 25 to 44; 25.9% were from 45 to 64; and 28.2% were 65 years of age or older. The gender makeup of the city was 58.8% male and 41.2% female.

=== 2000 census ===
As of the 2000 census, there were 92 people, 44 households, and 23 families residing in the city. The population density was 282.9 inhabitants per square mile (109.2/km^{2}). There were 67 housing units at an average density of 206.1 per square mile (79.6/km^{2}). The racial makeup of the city was 97.83% White, 1.09% Native American and 1.09% Asian.

There were 44 households, out of which 25.0% had children under the age of 18 living with them, 45.5% were married couples living together, 6.8% had a female householder with no husband present, and 45.5% were non-families. 43.2% of all households were made up of individuals, and 13.6% had someone living alone who was 65 years of age or older. The average household size was 2.09 and the average family size was 2.83.

In the city, the population was spread out, with 22.8% under the age of 18, 3.3% from 18 to 24, 18.5% from 25 to 44, 44.6% from 45 to 64, and 10.9% who were 65 years of age or older. The median age was 46 years. For every 100 females, there were 130.0 males. For every 100 females age 18 and over, there were 115.2 males.

The median income for a household in the city was $26,875, and the median income for a family was $27,188. Males had a median income of $26,250 versus $14,792 for females. The per capita income for the city was $16,497. There were 18.5% of families and 30.1% of the population living below the poverty line, including 55.6% of under eighteens and 28.6% of those over 64.

== Climate ==
This climatic region is typified by large seasonal temperature differences, with warm to hot (and often humid) summers and cold (sometimes severely cold) winters. According to the Köppen Climate Classification system, Ryder has a humid continental climate, abbreviated "Dfb" on climate maps.

== Education ==
Ryder is divided between the Lewis and Clark School District and the Max Public School District 50. Lewis and Clark formed in 2003 when three school districts merged.
