= Area code 701 =

Area code for North Dakota, United States

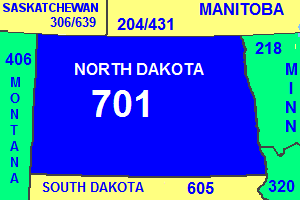
North Dakota numbering plan area and area code, with border states and provinces)

Area code 701 is a telephone area code in the North American Numbering Plan (NANP) for the U.S. State of North Dakota. It is one of the 86 original North American area codes created by AT&T in 1947, and continues to be the only area code in North Dakota, one of eleven states with only one area code. (Note: The other ones are in Alaska (907), Delaware (302), Hawaii (808), Maine (207), Montana (406), New Hampshire (603), Rhode Island (401), South Dakota (605), Vermont (802), and Wyoming (307))

Numbering plan area 701 is divided between the Bismarck and Fargo LATAs, and is one of only a few divided area codes. The Fargo LATA extends for some distance into northern Minnesota, as far east as Brainerd.

Numbering plan exhaust projections forecast that North Dakota will not need a new area code until 2029. About 730 of the nearly 800 possible central office codes have been assigned.

Being the sole area code in North Dakota, seven-digit dialing is in effect for all calls within the state. The situation was threatened in 2020, when it was anticipated that the state had to transition to always dialing ten digits, because of the implementation of a short-code (988) for the National Suicide Prevention Lifeline, because that code was assigned as a central office prefix to an office (CLLI code BSMRNDJC) in Bismarck. However, the local telephone administration decided to discontinue this central office code, and return it to the NANP Administrator. This action removed the need to implement ten-digit dialing in area code 701, until relief is necessary in the future.

== Service area and central office prefixes ==
- Abercrombie: 553
- Absaraka: 896
- Adams: 944
- Alamo: 528
- Alexander: 695, 744, 828, 844
- Alsen: 230, 393, 395, 398, 662, 665
- Alice: 689
- Ambrose: 982
- Amenia: 896
- Amidon: 879
- Aneta: 322, 326
- Antler: 267
- Argusville: 860
- Arnegard: 586
- Arthur: 967
- Ashley: 288, 374, 684
- Ayr: 896
- Baldwin: 286
- Balta: 542
- Beach: 218, 872, 876
- Belcourt: 393, 395, 472, 576
- Belfield: 559, 575, 719, 981, 999
- Berthold: 453, 468, 482
- Beulah: 870, 873, 905
- Binford: 296, 309, 676, 785
- Bisbee: 266, 656, 767
- Bismarck: 202, 204, 214, 220, 221, 222, 223, 224, 226, 250, 255, 258, 299, 323, 328, 354, 355, 390, 391, 400, 401, 415, 425, 426, 450, 471, 498, 516, 518, 527, 530, 557, 673, 712, 751, 791, 801, 805, 877, 934, 946, 954, 955, 957, 961, 975, 979, 989
- Bottineau: 201, 228, 263, 389, 480, 534, 871
- Bowbells: 310, 705
- Bowdon: 962, 984
- Bowman: 206, 440, 449, 458, 523, 574
- Braddock: 332
- Brocket: 655
- Buchanan: 251, 252, 253, 269, 320, 368, 419, 658, 659, 952
- Buffalo: 633, 749, 896
- Burlington: 453, 725
- Butte: 626
- Buxton: 856, 942
- Caledonia: 457, 856, 887, 942
- Cando: 303, 900, 968
- Carpio: 468
- Carrington: 307, 649, 650, 652, 653, 674, 717, 984
- Carson: 522, 622, 937
- Cartwright: 481, 505, 565, 829
- Casselton: 318, 346, 347, 501, 506, 660, 895
- Cathay: 600, 972, 984
- Cavalier: 265, 521
- Cayuga: 736
- Center: 207, 301, 794, 920
- Chaseley: 884
- Christine: 369, 469, 553, 588, 598, 969, 998
- Cleveland: 763
- Coleharbor: 487
- Colfax: 372, 469, 553
- Columbus: 939
- Cooperstown: 309, 789, 797
- Courtenay: 435
- Crary: 230, 350, 351, 381, 398, 662, 665
- Crete: 753
- Crosby: 965
- Cummings: 887, 942
- Crystal: 657
- Dahlen: 384
- Dawson: 769, 789, 797
- Dazey: 733, 769
- Deering: 728
- Denhoff: 769, 789, 797
- Des Lacs: 725
- Devils Lake: 230, 350, 351, 381, 398, 544, 662, 665, 766
- Dickey: 778
- Dickinson: 225, 227, 260, 264, 290, 300, 456, 483, 502, 504, 513, 590, 602, 690, 761, 779
- Dodge: 632, 846, 983
- Donnybrook: 217, 983
- Douglas: 529
- Drake: 287, 465, 889
- Drayton: 257, 454, 520
- Driscoll: 943
- Dunn Center: 548
- Dunseith: 244, 263, 472, 576
- East Carlyle: 688
- East Fairview: 695, 744, 844
- East Sidney: 481, 829
- East Westby: 985
- Edgeley: 396, 493, 709, 830
- Edinburg: 496, 657, 993
- Edmore: 644, 655, 949
- Edmunds: 285
- Egeland: 266, 682
- Elgin: 584, 622
- Ellendale: 344, 349, 408, 535
- Emerado: 317, 594, 631, 739, 741, 747, 808, 935
- Emmet: 337, 661
- Enderlin: 437, 820, 882, 912
- Epping: 568, 770, 859
- Erie: 668
- Esmond: 249
- Fairdale: 949, 966
- Fairmount: 474, 514
- Fargo/West Fargo: 200, 205, 212, 219, 231, 232, 234, 235, 237, 238, 239, 241, 261, 271, 277, 280, 281, 282, 293, 297, 298, 306, 353, 356, 361, 364, 367, 369, 371, 373, 388, 404, 405, 412, 417, 429, 433, 451, 461, 476, 478, 492, 499, 515, 526, 532, 540, 541, 551, 552, 561, 566, 588, 598, 612, 630, 639, 707, 715, 729, 730, 781, 793, 799, 809, 850, 866, 893, 929, 936, 941, 960, 964, 969, 970, 977, 997
- Fessenden: 236, 547
- Fingal: 490, 924
- Finley: 524, 945
- Flasher: 597
- Flaxton: 596
- Forbes: 357
- Fordville: 229, 384, 593
- Forman: 724
- Fort Ransom: 973
- Fort Totten: 766
- Fort Yates: 854
- Fortuna: 601, 834, 985
- Fredonia: 698
- Fullerton: 375, 408
- Gackle: 485
- Galesburg: 488, 668
- Gardner: 342, 484, 638, 714, 860
- Garrison: 337, 463, 487, 529, 661, 836
- Gilby: 869
- Glen Ullin: 348
- Glenburn: 362, 723, 727, 728
- Golden Valley: 983
- Goodrich: 396
- Grace City: 674
- Grafton: 352, 360, 379, 510, 922
- Grand Forks: 203, 213, 215, 314, 330, 335, 402, 410, 517, 610, 620, 670, 732, 738, 740, 746, 757, 765, 772, 775, 777, 780, 787, 792, 795, 864, 885
- Grand Forks AFB: 747
- Grandin: 457, 860
- Grassy Butte: 863
- Great Bend: 545
- Grenora: 694
- Guelph: 710, 783
- Gwinner: 308, 678, 680, 753
- Halliday: 938
- Hamilton: 257, 520, 521
- Hampden: 682, 868
- Hankinson: 242, 416, 545, 634
- Hannaford: 309
- Hannah: 283
- Harvey: 324, 341, 399, 635, 849
- Harwood: 714
- Hatton: 543, 569, 963
- Havana: 443
- Hazelton: 782
- Hazen: 494, 748, 880, 891
- Hebron: 878
- Hensel: 521, 657
- Hettinger: 376, 567, 637, 928
- Hickson: 369, 588, 598, 969
- Hillsboro: 289, 383, 430, 436, 457, 636, 887
- Hoople: 257, 520, 657, 894
- Hope: 668, 945
- Horace: 369, 588, 598, 969
- Hunter: 874
- Inkster: 384, 865
- Jamestown: 251, 252, 253, 269, 320, 368, 394, 419, 658, 659, 952
- Jud: 685
- Karlsruhe: 525
- Kathryn: 796
- Keene: 675
- Kenmare: 217, 334, 339, 377, 385, 467, 482, 835, 848, 923
- Killdeer: 764, 927
- Kindred: 409, 428, 718, 773
- Kintyre: 332
- Knox: 583
- Kramer: 272, 359
- Kulm: 396, 647
- Ladd: 574
- Lakota: 247, 259, 270, 304, 655
- LaMoure: 883
- Landa: 295
- Langdon: 256, 283, 305, 370, 382, 686
- Lankin: 283
- Lansford: 784
- Larimore: 343, 431, 807
- Lawton: 655
- Leeds: 466
- Lehr: 378
- Leonard: 434, 645, 800
- Lidgerwood: 519, 538, 736
- Lignite: 596, 933, 939
- Linton: 254, 455, 851
- Lisbon: 683
- Litchville: 669, 762
- Luverne: 945
- Maddock: 438
- Makoti: 726
- Mandan: 354, 445, 663, 667
- Mandaree: 759
- Manning: 573
- Mantador: 545
- Manvel: 564, 696, 699, 888
- Marion: 669, 883
- Marmarth: 688
- Marmon: 826
- Martin: 625, 693
- Max: 529, 679, 832
- Maxbass: 268, 272
- Mayville: 380, 414, 786, 788
- McClusky: 363, 447, 884
- McGregor: 464, 546
- McHenry: 785
- McKenzie: 562, 673
- McVille: 949
- Medina: 486
- Medora: 623
- Mercer: 531
- Merricourt: 396
- Metigoshe: 263, 389
- Michigan: 259, 270
- Milnor: 427
- Milton: 496
- Minnewaukan: 473, 798
- Minot: 240, 340, 418, 420, 441, 500, 509, 578, 720, 721, 722, 725, 818, 833, 837, 838, 839, 852, 857, 858
- Minot AFB: 723, 727
- Minto: 248, 358, 666, 699
- Mohall: 756
- Mooreton: 274, 545
- Mott: 824
- Mountain: 496
- Munich: 798
- Napoleon: 332, 692, 754
- Neche: 886
- Nekoma: 949
- Nelvik: 374
- Newburg: 272
- New Effington: 634
- New England: 579
- New Leipzig: 584
- New Rockford: 302, 600, 947, 972
- New Salem: 843
- New Town: 407, 421, 627, 951
- Newburg: 272, 295
- Niagara: 259, 270, 397
- Nome: 924
- Noonan: 925, 939
- Norma: 467
- North Britton: 443
- North Hecla: 992
- North Lemmon: 376
- North McIntosh: 276, 815
- North McLaghlin: 827
- North Morristn: 522, 937
- North Veblen: 736
- Northwood: 291, 587
- Norwich: 500, 728, 818
- Oakes: 210, 408, 742, 753, 992
- Oberon: 798
- Oriska: 689, 882, 924
- Osnabrock: 496
- Page: 689, 749
- Park River: 284, 331, 593
- Parshall: 312, 862, 897, 898
- Pekin: 296
- Pembina: 825
- Penn: 544
- Petersburg: 259, 270, 345, 384
- Pettibone: 710, 783
- Pingree: 285
- Pisek: 593
- Pick City: 487
- Plaza: 497
- Portal: 596, 926, 939
- Powers Lake: 464, 546
- Raleigh: 622
- Ray: 770, 875
- Reeder: 691, 853
- Regan: 286
- Regent: 209, 563, 589
- Reynolds: 607, 841, 847, 856
- Rhame: 279, 582
- Richardton: 956, 974
- Robinson: 992
- Rocklake: 393
- Rolette: 246, 472, 507, 560, 576
- Rolla: 278, 477, 550, 953
- Roseglen: 743
- Ross: 755
- Round Prairie: 702, 875
- Rugby: 208, 542, 681, 771, 776, 881
- Rutland: 736
- Ryder: 529, 758
- St. Anthony: 445
- St. Michael: 350, 351, 381, 544, 766
- St. Thomas: 257, 520
- Sanborn: 646
- Sarles: 697
- Sawyer: 624, 722
- Scranton: 275, 533
- Selfridge: 276, 422, 503, 815, 827
- Sheldon: 882
- Sherwood: 459
- Sheyenne: 302, 600, 766, 798, 947, 972, 996
- Souris: 243, 295
- South Heart: 413, 677
- South Prairie: 722
- Spencer: 217, 848, 923
- Spiritwood: 394, 669, 883
- Squaw Gap: 565
- Stanley: 313, 621, 628, 629
- Stanton: 487, 745, 920
- Starkweather: 233, 292, 682
- Steele: 316, 327, 392, 475, 556, 867
- Sterling: 387, 562, 673
- Stirum: 753
- Strasburg: 321, 325, 329, 336
- Streeter: 424
- Surrey: 728
- Sutton: 785
- Sykeston: 710, 783
- Tappen: 992
- Thompson: 554, 599, 987
- Tioga: 216, 568, 641, 648, 664
- Tolley: 386, 467
- Tolna: 262, 296, 322
- Tower City: 689, 749
- Towner: 537
- Turtle Lake: 447, 448, 531
- Tuttle: 867
- Underwood: 442, 448, 531, 654, 980
- Upham: 768
- Valley City: 490, 512, 760, 840, 845, 890
- Velva: 338
- Venturia: 684
- Verona: 432
- Wahpeton: 403, 591, 640, 642, 671, 672, 892, 899, 971
- Walcott: 469, 553
- Wales: 283
- Walhalla: 549, 821
- Warwick: 294
- Washburn: 315, 460, 462, 558, 737, 861
- Watford City: 444, 842
- Webster: 395
- West Climax: 856
- Westhope: 245, 295
- West Halstad: 457
- West Oslo: 699
- West Nielsville: 942
- West Perley: 860
- West Shelby: 887
- White Earth: 464
- Wildrose: 528, 539, 546
- Williston: 570, 571, 572, 577, 580, 609, 651, 702, 713, 770, 774, 822, 875, 901
- Willow City: 366, 687
- Wilton: 286, 734
- Windsor: 763
- Wing: 710, 783
- Wishek: 452, 731
- Woodworth: 273, 752
- Wyndmere: 439
- York: 592
- Ypsilanti: 251, 252, 253, 269, 320, 368, 394, 419, 489, 658, 659, 952
- Zahl: 528, 826
- Zap: 948, 983
- Zeeland: 423, 684

Premium calls (unassigned): 211, 311, 319, 333, 365, 406, 411, 446, 470, 479, 491, 495, 508, 536, 555, 558, 581, 585, 595, 603, 604, 605, 606, 608, 611, 613, 614, 615, 616, 617, 618, 619, 643, 700, 701, 703, 704, 706, 708, 711, 716, 735, 750, 790, 802, 803, 804, 806, 810, 811, 812, 813, 814, 816, 817, 819, 823, 831, 855, 902, 903, 904, 906, 907, 908, 909, 910, 911, 913, 914, 915, 916, 917, 918, 919, 921, 930, 931, 932, 940, 950, 958, 959, 976, 978, 986, 990, 991, 994 & 995.

== See also ==
- List of North American Numbering Plan area codes

== Notes ==
North Dakota area codes: 701
	North: 204, 306	
West: 406	701	East: 218, 320
	South: 605	
Manitoba area codes: 204/431/584
Saskatchewan area codes: 306/474/639
Minnesota area codes: 218, 320, 507/924, 612, 651, 763, 952
Montana area codes: 406
South Dakota area codes: 605
