= Van Hook Township, Mountrail County, North Dakota =

Van Hook Township, North Dakota
- Township
- Location within the state of North Dakota
- Coordinates: 47°58′14″N 102°19′58″W
- Country: United States
- State: North Dakota
- County: Mountrail

Area
  - Total: 36.5 sq mi (95 km^{2})
  - Land: 32.9 sq mi (85 km^{2})
  - Water: 3.6 sq mi (9.3 km^{2})
- Elevation: 1,900 ft (580 m)

Population (2000)
  - Total: 42
  - Density: 1.3/sq mi (0.5/km^{2})
- Time zone: UTC-6 (Central (CST))
  - Summer (DST): UTC-5 (CDT)
- Area code: 701
- FIPS code: 38-81420
- GNIS feature ID: 1037116

Van Hook Township is a township in Mountrail County in the U.S. state of North Dakota. At the time of the 2000 Census, its population was 42, and estimated to be 41 as of 2009.

== History ==
The township is named for Fred Van Hook who helped survey the area in the early 1910s. A Soo Line Railroad station was established at Van Hook in 1914, resulting in rapid population growth. Van Hook Township's population grew from 65 in 1910 to 278 in 1920, at which time it was counted as an organized civil township. The population peaked 1930.

The village of Van Hook continued to grow, reaching a population of 380 in 1950. However, the town soon declined after it was flooded by Lake Sakakawea. Most of the residents were relocated to the nearby city of New Town after the city disincorporated in 1953.

The resort community of Van Hook in Van Hook township has since been rebuilt on the old town site most of which was never flooded. It is currently a thriving community on the north shore of Lake Sakakawea with both permanent and summer residents. The community is unincorporated, and many of the homes are second homes for residents. US Census population is untabulated. The 2018 population of Van Hook township far exceeds 42, especially if summer residents are counted.

== Geography ==
Much of the township is part of the Fort Berthold Indian Reservation. The township covers 36.5 square miles (95 km^{2}), 10 percent (2.6 sq mi (6.7 km^{2})) of which is underwater. The southern portion of the township was flooded when Lake Sakakawea was created due to construction of Garrison Dam in the early 1950s. Lake Sakakawea's Van Hook Arm is named for the township.

== Demographics ==
As of the 2000 Census, there were 42 individuals, 23 households, and 13 families living in the township but this number seriously underestimates the number of people who have homes in the township. On average, the population density was 1.3 inhabitants per square mile (0.50/km^{2}). Racially, based on those who identified having only one race in their responses to the Census, the township was 31% White and 12% were American Indians. 57.1% of the township identified themselves as being from two or more races. The 2000 Census also allowed respondents to select more than one race. When that is taken into account, 88.1% of the residents identified themselves as White and 14.3% identified themselves as American Indian.
