= Verendrye National Monument =

Former US national monument in North Dakota

Coordinates: 47.9825°N 102.54528°W

Verendrye National Monument was a federally protected area in the U.S. state of North Dakota from 1917 to 1956. In the latter year it was withdrawn as a national monument. It is located in southwestern Mountrail County, west of the city of New Town. It lies within the Fort Berthold Indian Reservation.

This 250 acres (100 ha) monument was established on June 29, 1917, to commemorate the explorations of Pierre Gaultier de Varennes, sieur de La Vérendrye and his sons in North Dakota and the area of the upper Missouri River. The father was a French-Canadian explorer and fur-trader intent on finding an overland water route to the Western Ocean. Between 1731 and 1737 he built several trading posts between Lake Superior and Lake Winnipeg, assisted by his four sons and a nephew. In 1738 he and son François traveled southwest to what is now North Dakota, arriving in December at a Mandan village a day's journey from the Missouri River. On that trip Vérendrye established two forts, Fort Rouge and Fort La Reine, in what is now Manitoba. Other forts built to the north and west by people under his command created a large area in the west for French traders.

In 1742 two of his sons (probably Louis-Joseph and François) made another expedition to the Missouri. Because of the difficulty of identifying places and Native American tribes in their reports, there is no certainty as to the route they took or how far they traveled, but they may have been the first European explorers to view the Rocky Mountains. This was more than 60 years before the expedition of Lewis and Clark.

It was on this 1742-43 expedition that the Vérendrye brothers were thought to have camped at Crowhigh Butte (now called Crow Flies High Butte) in North Dakota. This 565-foot (172 m) high butte dominates the surrounding plains and is an ideal vantage point. In 1917 the state historical society was instrumental in getting the butte and surrounding area proclaimed a national monument. A plaque at the monument reads:

The Verendrye National Monument. Established June 29, 1917. To commemorate discovery of this area in 1742 by the Sons of Verendrye, celebrated French explorer. Crowhigh Mountain was used as an observation station to spy out unknown land farther west. In 1738 the elder Verendrye and one son made a trip to within a day's journey of the Missouri River, and were the first white men to enter what is now North Dakota. This was in the course of a journey from Verendrye's trading post in Manitoba, Canada, in an effort, which was unsuccessful, to reach the western sea by an overland route.

However, later opinion suggested that the site was inaccurately located. On July 30, 1956, the site was withdrawn as a national monument and transferred to the State of North Dakota. Much of the original site has since been flooded by a reservoir (Lake Sakakawea).

Ironically, new research indicates that Crow Flies High Butte may indeed be the site where the Verendryes climbed to view the Little Missouri Valley in 1742.
