= Van Hook =

Van Hook or VanHook is a surname. Notable people with the surname include:

- Caroline van Hook Bean (1879–1980) American painter
- Clay Van Hook (born 1985), American basketball coach
- Forest Van Hook (1883–1937), American football player
- Kendall Vanhook Bumpass (1809–1885) American pioneer
- Kevin VanHook (born 1965), American comics writer and film director
- Loretta C. Van Hook (1852–1935), American missionary and educator
- Robert Van Hook (1960–2018), American convicted murderer executed in Ohio

== See also ==
- Van Hook Township, Mountrail County, North Dakota, township in the United States
- Van Hook, North Dakota, ghost town in the United States
- Van Hook State Wildlife Management Area
