= Belden, North Dakota =

Coordinates: 48°09′05″N 102°21′27″W

Belden is a ghost town located in Sikes Township in Mountrail County, North Dakota, United States. It is located along North Dakota Highway 8 between Stanley and the former town of Van Hook. The village was founded in 1904, and was reportedly named for W. L. Belden, North Dakota's Indian agent at-large who was stationed at Fort Berthold Indian Reservation at the time.

== History ==
Belden was founded in 1904 by Finnish settlers when the area was still part of Ward County. The village never exceeded a population of more than 25. The post office was established in 1904 as well, and operated continuously until 1986 with the ZIP code of 58715. The Belden Store was considered a local landmark. Today, Belden has a population of about 6 or 7.

== See also ==
- List of ghost towns in North Dakota
