= Fort Berthold =

Coordinates: 47°30′45″N 101°48′48″W

Fort Berthold was the name of two successive forts on the upper Missouri River in present-day central-northwest North Dakota. Both were initially established as fur trading posts. The second was adapted as a post for the U.S. Army. After the Army left the area, having subdued Native Americans, the fort was used by the US as the Indian Agency for the regional Arikara, Hidatsa, and Mandan Affiliated Tribes and their reservation.

In the mid-1950s both of the former fort sites were submerged under Lake Sakakawea, created by extensive flooding of the bottomlands after the Garrison Dam was constructed on the Missouri River.

The forts were named after Italian-born Bartholomew Berthold (1780–1831), a prominent merchant and fur trader of St. Louis. He collaborated with the Chouteau and Astor families in trading in this region.

He built what became known as the Berthold Mansion at Fifth (now Broadway) and Pine streets in St. Louis. Decades after his death, it was used as the headquarters of the Democratic Party. After Abraham Lincoln's election in 1860, the Berthold mansion was used for pro-Southern secessionists known as Minute Men. It was then known as "Fort Berthold".

== History ==
Born Berthelemi Antoine Marthias Bertolla de Moncenigo near the city of Trento, Italy in 1780, Bertolla emigrated to the United States in 1798 as a young man. He made his way to St. Louis, where he went into business with Major Pierre Chouteau and married his daughter Pélagie. He anglicized his name to Bartholomew Berthold. He became a successful merchant and fur trader, through which he had ties throughout the west. Fur trading was the main source of wealth in the city.

The first Fort Berthold was founded in 1845 on the upper Missouri River by the American Fur Company (controlled until 1830 by John Jacob Astor). It was originally called Fort James, but was renamed in 1846 for the late Berthold. As a consequence of the hostilities with the United States of the Dakota War of 1862, the Sioux burned this fort.

Fort Atkinson was an independent fur trade post built in 1858 by Charles Larpenteur on the Missouri River, south of what is now White Shield, North Dakota (within the Fort Berthold Indian Reservation). The American Fur Company had purchased this fort after theirs was burned in 1862. They renamed it as Fort Berthold.

The Army took over the property, stationing a garrison here. They also established a log camp outside the stockade to supply the fort during the winter of 1864–1865. This fort was used as an army post until 1867, when the military garrison removed to Fort Stevenson.

When responsibility for relations with Indian tribes was transferred from the War Department to the Department of Interior, the latter agency took over Fort Berthold and several other forts. After 1868 the post was used as the US Indian Agency for the Arikara, Hidatsa, and Mandan tribes. These peoples were administered as a combined tribe on what is now the Fort Berthold Indian Reservation. The fort also functioned as a trading post to 1874.

In the 1950s, these peoples lost most of their fertile farmland, homes, and several towns they had long established in the bottomlands along the river, in addition to cemeteries. They were forced to give up these lands to be flooded by the government's creation of Lake Sakakawea following construction of the Garrison Dam in 1953.
