= Wabek Consolidated School =

- U.S. National Register of Historic Places
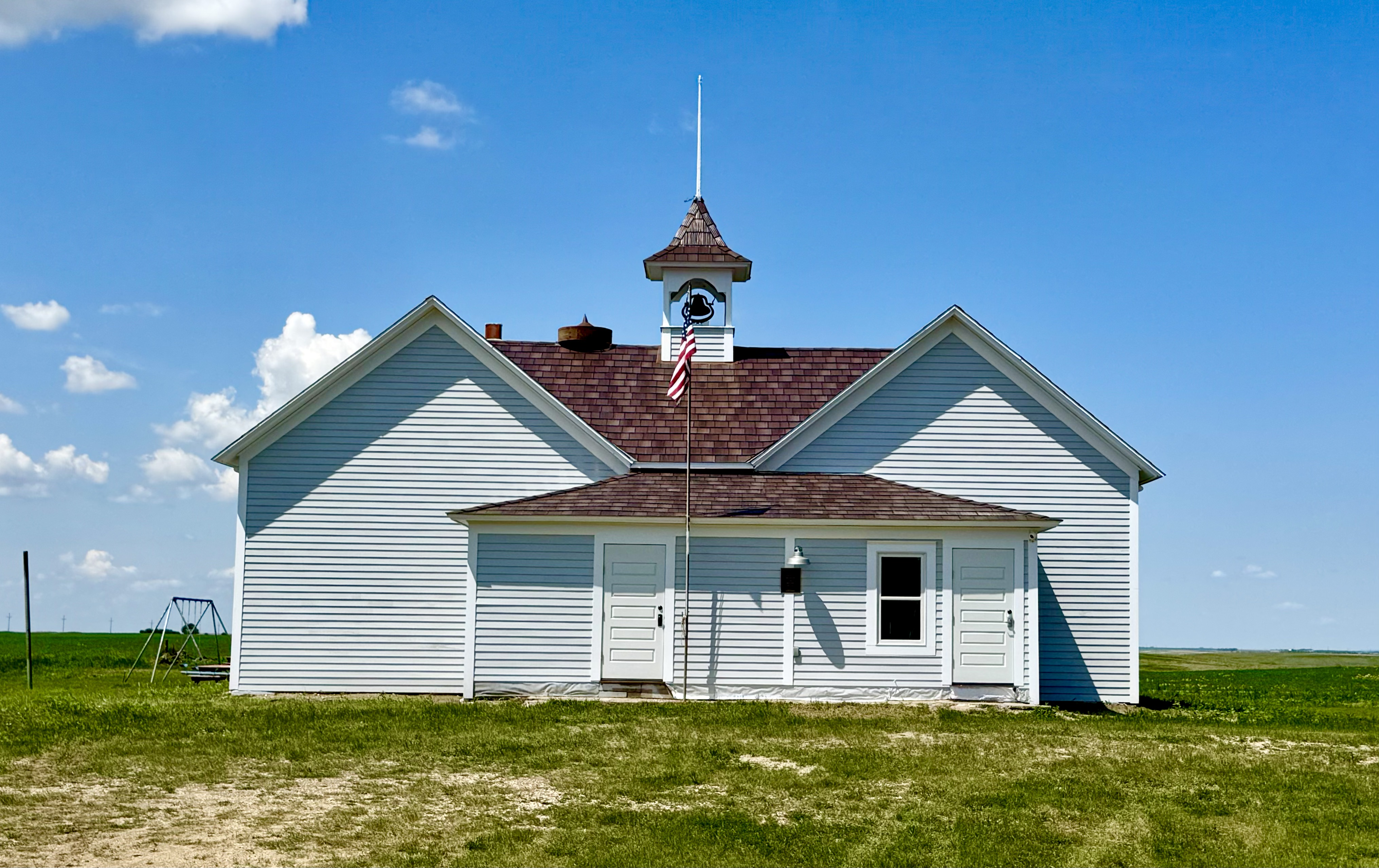
- Front facade of Wabek Consolidated School in 2025

- Location within North Dakota Location within the United States
- Location: 3825 64th Ave. NW, Wabek, N.D. near New Town, North Dakota
- Coordinates: 47.966871°N 101.958362°W
- Built: circa 1917
- Architectural style: Pre WWII Physical Consolidation
- NRHP reference No.: 100004541
- Added to NRHP: October 22, 2019

Wabek Consolidated School, located at 3825 64th Ave. NW in Mountrail County, North Dakota near New Town, North Dakota, was listed on the National Register of Historic Places in 2019.

The school is a unique two-room schoolhouse, assembled in 1917 by adjoining two one-room schoolhouses, which were moved to the present site at Wabek. A bell-tower was inserted between them, which was likely the original bell tower associated with the right half of the building prior to physical consolidation in 1917.

A national and state historic site as of October 2019 and January 2025 respectively, Wabek Consolidated School Historic Site consists of a rare two-room pre-WWII physically consolidated schoolhouse, a historic playground, and a two-acre schoolyard. The site is located about 25 miles (40 km) east of New Town, roughly 7 miles (11 km) west of Makoti, or roughly 50 minutes southwest of Minot.

== Saved from demolition ==
On August 3, 2018, local resident Hunter Andes circulated a petition within the local township in Mountrail County, to save the century-old structure from being demolished by the township board of directors. Fifty-two percent of the residents in the township signed the petition. Andes created a 501(c)(3) non-profit charitable organization to raise funds for repairs and preservation. Between 2018 and 2025, enough funds were raised through grants and local donations to nearly finish the project. Work that remains is installation of a handicap assemble deck and a period appropriate Water Closet.

== Preservation ==
In January 2025, Wabek Consolidated School was added to the North Dakota State Historic Sites Registry (SHSR) gaining a number of protections it needed in an effort to maintain its historic integrity. It was the first site to be added to (SHSR) in the last 25 years. As of July 2025, the preserved schoolhouse opened to the public by appointment; the facility can also be rented out for events.
