= Windsor, North Dakota =

Windsor
- Unincorporated community
- Location within the state of North Dakota Windsor (the United States)
- Coordinates: 46°53′47″N 99°02′34″W
- Country: United States
- State: North Dakota
- County: Stutsman
- Elevation: 1,850 ft (560 m)
- Time zone: UTC-6 (Central (CST))
  - Summer (DST): UTC-5 (CDT)
- Area code: 701
- FIPS code: 38-86660
- GNIS feature ID: 1032844

Windsor is an unincorporated community in Stutsman County, in the U.S. state of North Dakota.

== History ==
A post office called Windsor was established in 1883, and remained in operation until 1975. The community was named after Windsor, Ontario.
