= Carpio, North Dakota =

- City
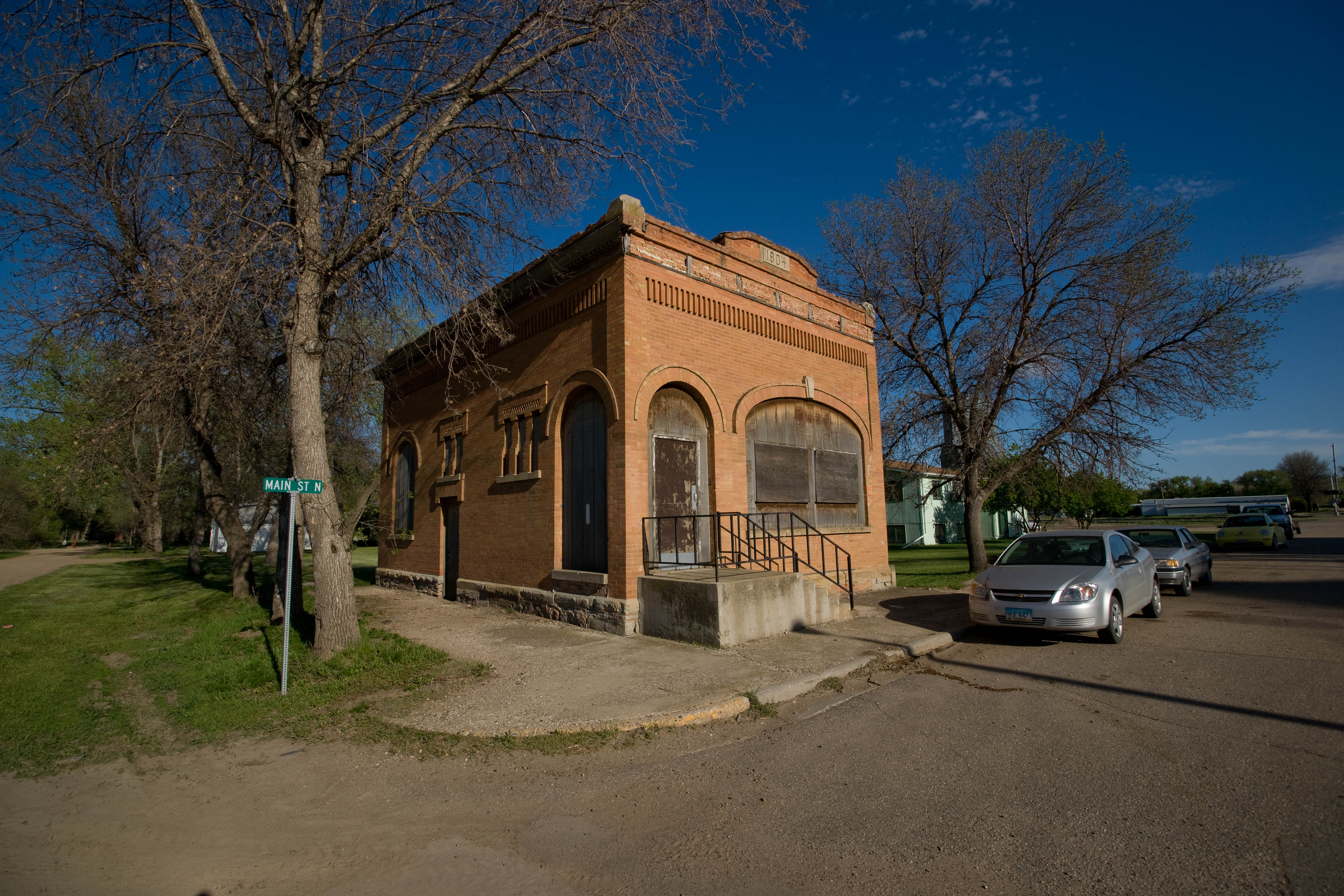

- Location of Carpio, North Dakota
- Coordinates: 48°26′36″N 101°42′59″W
- Country: United States
- State: North Dakota
- County: Ward
- Founded: 1898

Government
  - Mayor: Austin Burkett

Area
  - Total: 0.63 sq mi (1.64 km^{2})
  - Land: 0.63 sq mi (1.64 km^{2})
  - Water: 0 sq mi (0.00 km^{2})
- Elevation: 1,600 ft (500 m)

Population (2020)
  - Total: 144
  - Estimate (2024): 139
  - Density: 227.6/sq mi (87.89/km^{2})
- Time zone: UTC–6 (Central (CST))
  - Summer (DST): UTC–5 (CDT)
- ZIP Code: 58725
- Area code: 701
- FIPS code: 38-12260
- GNIS feature ID: 1035954

Carpio is a city in Ward County, North Dakota, United States. The population was 144 at the 2020 census. It is part of the Minot Micropolitan Statistical Area. Carpio was founded in 1898. It is commonly believed that the town was named after the first post office which operated out of a railcar - hence 'Car P.O.'.

== Geography ==
According to the United States Census Bureau, the city has a total area of 0.59 square miles (1.53 km^{2}), all land.

== Demographics ==
Historical population
Census	Pop.	Note	%±
1910	257		—
1920	244		−5.1%
1930	344		41.0%
1940	322		−6.4%
1950	194		−39.8%
1960	199		2.6%
1970	215		8.0%
1980	244		13.5%
1990	178		−27.0%
2000	148		−16.9%
2010	157		6.1%
2020	144		−8.3%
2024 (est.)	139		−3.5%
U.S. Decennial Census; 2020 Census

=== 2010 census ===
As of the census of 2010, there were 157 people, 71 households, and 40 families residing in the city. The population density was 266.1 inhabitants per square mile (102.7/km^{2}). There were 83 housing units at an average density of 140.7 per square mile (54.3/km^{2}). The racial makeup of the city was 99.4% White and 0.6% Native American.

There were 71 households, of which 26.8% had children under the age of 18 living with them, 47.9% were married couples living together, 2.8% had a female householder with no husband present, 5.6% had a male householder with no wife present, and 43.7% were non-families. 36.6% of all households were made up of individuals, and 12.7% had someone living alone who was 65 years of age or older. The average household size was 2.21 and the average family size was 2.93.

The median age in the city was 43.5 years. 21.7% of residents were under the age of 18; 5.7% were between the ages of 18 and 24; 25.5% were from 25 to 44; 26.2% were from 45 to 64; and 21% were 65 years of age or older. The gender makeup of the city was 56.7% male and 43.3% female.

=== 2000 census ===
As of the census of 2000, there were 148 people, 67 households, and 39 families residing in the city. The population density was 251.3 inhabitants per square mile (97.0/km^{2}). There were 90 housing units at an average density of 152.8 per square mile (59.0/km^{2}). The racial makeup of the city was 100.00% White. 61.1% were of Norwegian and 21.4% German ancestry.

There were 67 households, out of which 22.4% had children under the age of 18 living with them, 55.2% were married couples living together, 1.5% had a female householder with no husband present, and 40.3% were non-families. 37.3% of all households were made up of individuals, and 16.4% had someone living alone who was 65 years of age or older. The average household size was 2.21 and the average family size was 2.98.

In the city, the population was spread out, with 24.3% under the age of 18, 2.0% from 18 to 24, 26.4% from 25 to 44, 19.6% from 45 to 64, and 27.7% who were 65 years of age or older. The median age was 42 years. For every 100 females, there were 120.9 males. For every 100 females age 18 and over, there were 115.4 males.

The median income for a household in the city was $22,344, and the median income for a family was $39,375. Males had a median income of $28,750 versus $21,250 for females. The per capita income for the city was $15,397. There were 10.8% of families and 11.2% of the population living below the poverty line, including 11.4% of under eighteens and 12.2% of those over 64.

== Climate ==
This climatic region is typified by large seasonal temperature differences, with warm to hot (and often humid) summers and cold (sometimes severely cold) winters. According to the Köppen Climate Classification system, Carpio has a humid continental climate, abbreviated "Dfb" on climate maps.

== Education ==
Carpio is divided between the Lewis and Clark School District and the United Public School District 7. Lewis and Clark formed in 2003 when three school districts merged.
