= Arikara language =

Caddoan language of North Dakota

Arikara
- Sáhniš
- Native to: United States
- Region: North-central North Dakota
- Ethnicity: 792 Arikara (2010 census)
- Native speakers: 10 (2007)
- Language family: Caddoan: Northern; Pawnee–Kitsai; Pawnee–Arikara; Arikara
- Writing system: Latin script

Language codes
- ISO 639-3: ari
- Glottolog: arik1262
- ELP: Arikara
- Linguasphere: 64-BAA-a
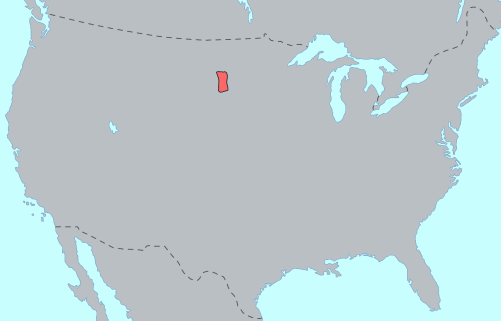
- Arikara language distribution

- Arikara is classified as Critically Endangered by the UNESCO Atlas of the World's Languages in Danger.

Arikara, known natively as Sáhniš, is a Caddoan language spoken by the Arikara Native Americans who reside primarily at Fort Berthold Reservation in North Dakota. Arikara is close to the Pawnee language, but they are not mutually intelligible.

The Arikara were apparently a group met by Lewis and Clark in 1804; their population of 30,000 was reduced to 6,000 by smallpox.

== History ==
For several hundred years, the Arikara lived as a semi-nomadic people on the Great Plains in present-day United States. They are believed to have separated as a people from the Pawnee in about the 15th century. The Arzberger site near present-day Pierre, South Dakota, designated as a National Historic Landmark, is an archeological site from this period, containing the remains of a fortified village with more than 44 lodges.

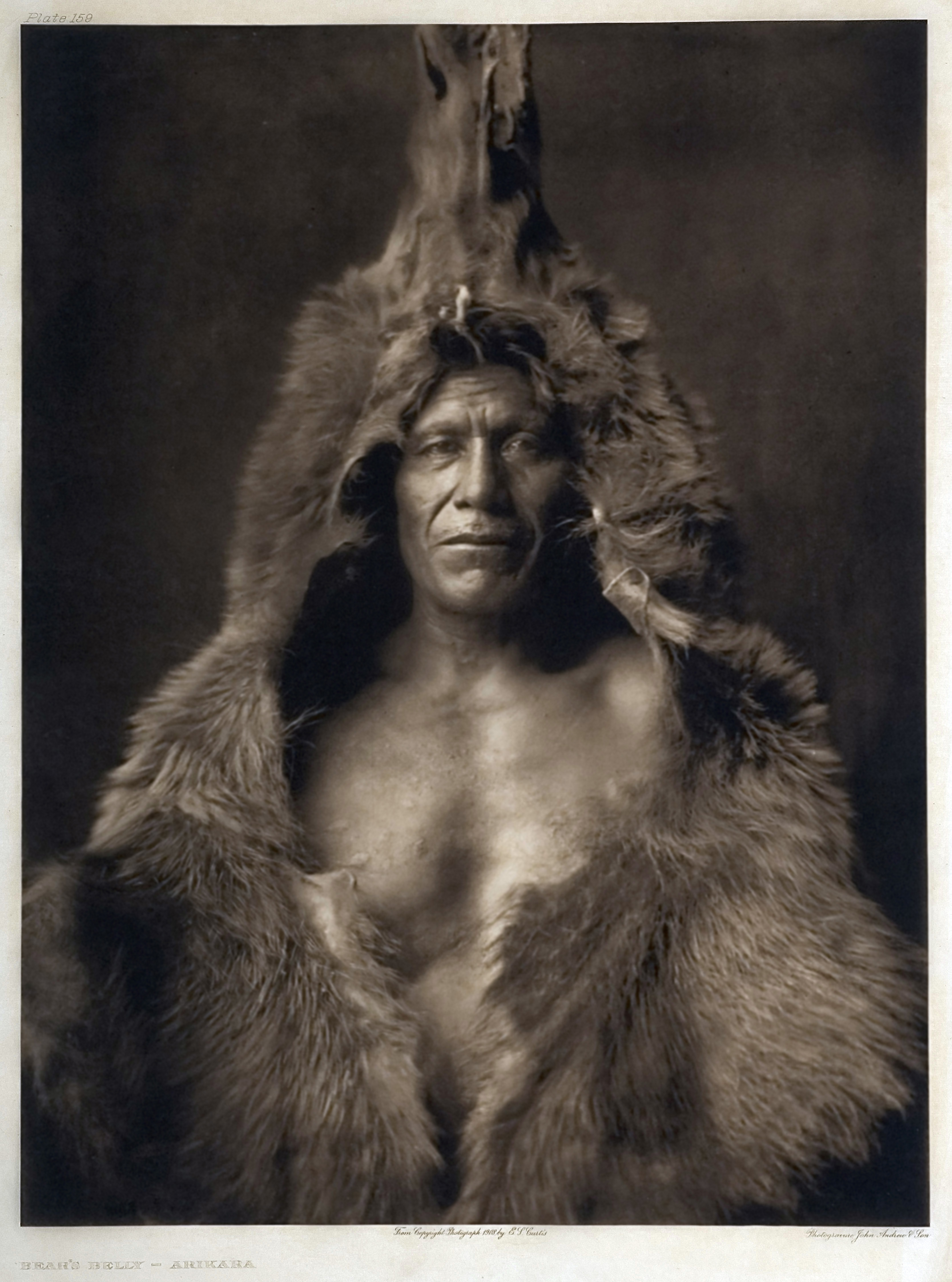
Arikara man, wearing a bearskin, 1908

During the sedentary seasons, the Arikara lived primarily in villages of earth lodges. While traveling or during the seasonal bison hunts, they erected portable tipis as temporary shelter. They were primarily an agricultural society, whose women cultivated varieties of corn (or maize). The crop was such an important staple of their society that it was referred to as "Mother Corn".

Traditionally an Arikara family owned 30–40 dogs. The people used them for hunting and as sentries, but most importantly for transportation in the centuries before the Plains tribes adopted the use of horses in the 1600s. Many of the Plains tribes had used the travois, a lightweight transportation device pulled by dogs. It consisted of two long poles attached by a harness at the dog's shoulders, with the butt ends dragging behind the animal; midway, a ladder-like frame, or a hoop made of plaited thongs, was stretched between the poles; it held loads that might exceed 60 pounds. Women also used dogs to pull travois to haul firewood or infants. The travois were used to carry meat harvested during the seasonal hunts; a single dog could pull a quarter of a bison.

In the late 18th century, the tribe suffered a high rate of fatalities from smallpox epidemics, which so reduced their population as to disrupt their social structure. Due to their reduced numbers, the Arikara started to live closer to the Mandan and Hidatsa tribes in the same area for mutual protection. They migrated gradually from present-day Nebraska and South Dakota into North Dakota in response to pressure from other tribes, especially the Sioux, and European-American settlers. During the Black Hills War, in 1876 some Arikara served as scouts for Lt. Col. George Armstrong Custer in the Little Bighorn Campaign.

The three tribes are settled on the Fort Berthold reservation in North Dakota.

== Phonology ==
=== Consonants ===
Arikara has the following consonant phonemes: Notably, it is one of the very few languages without [m].

	Labial	Alveolar	Post- alveolar	Velar	Glottal
Stop	p	t	tʃ ⟨c⟩	k	ʔ
Fricative		s	ʃ	x	h
Nasal		n			
Approximant	w	r			

Arikara distinguishes between the affricate [t͡ʃ] and the consonant cluster /t+ʃ/:

- čipátš 'knotweed' = [t͡ʃiˈpətʃ]

Voiced consonants in Arikara have voiceless allophones. Whenever a sonorant precedes a devoiced vowel, that sonorant devoices as well.

- čiíRA 'hello (male greeting)' = [t͡ʃiːr̥ə̥]
- táWIt 'three' = [ˈtəw̥ɪ̥t]
- NAhaá'U 'his or her child' = [n̥ə̥ˈhaːʔʊ̥]

=== Vowels ===
Arikara has the following vowel phonemes:

	Front		Central		Back	
	short	long	short	long	short	long
Close	i	iː			u	uː
Mid	e	eː			o	oː
Open			a	aː		

== Current status ==
Arikara is now spoken in North Dakota by a very few elders. One of the last fluent speakers, Maude Starr, died on January 20, 2010. She was a certified language teacher who participated in Arikara language education programs. Language revitalization efforts are continuing. As of 2014, speakers are centered on White Shield, North Dakota. The language is taught at Fort Berthold Community College, White Shield School, and at the Arikara Cultural Center.

Arikara is extensively documented, with several volumes of interlinear texts of Arikara stories, a learner's introductory text, and linguistic studies. As of 2014, iPhone and iPad Arikara language apps are available.

The language is used in the 2015 film The Revenant starring Leonardo DiCaprio as Hugh Glass, a mountain man who interacted with Arikara people and learned the language in the 19th century.

== Bibliography ==
- Campbell, Lyle (1997). American Indian languages: The Historical Linguistics of Native America, New York: Oxford University Press. ISBN 0-19-509427-1.
- Mithun, Marianne (1999). The Languages of Native North America, Cambridge: Cambridge University Press. ISBN 0-521-23228-7 (hbk); ISBN 0-521-29875-X.
