= Palermo, North Dakota =

City in Mountrail County, North Dakota, United States

- City
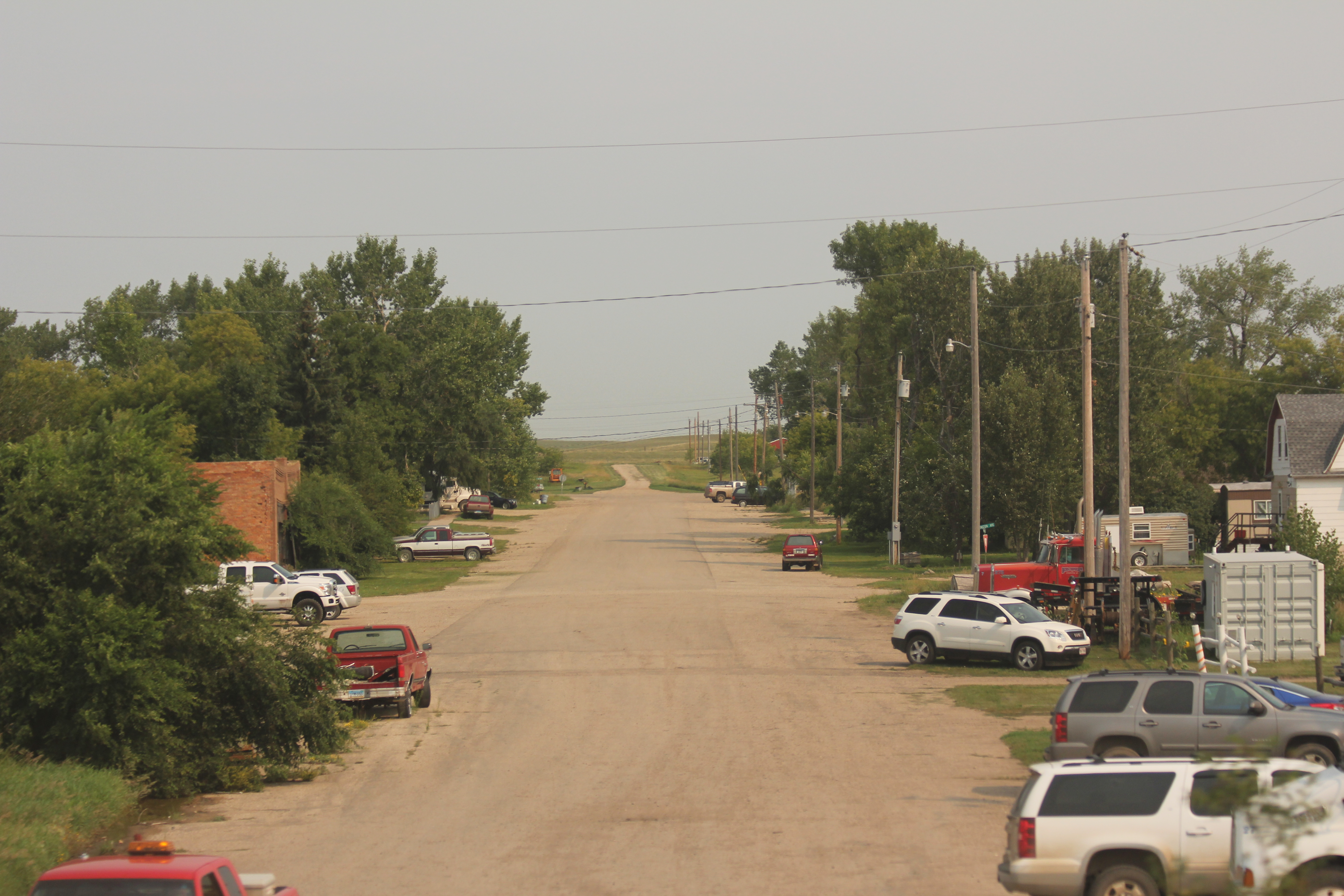
- Houses in Palermo

- Location of Palermo, North Dakota
- Coordinates: 48°20′17″N 102°13′47″W
- Country: United States
- State: North Dakota
- County: Mountrail
- Founded: 1902

Area
  - Total: 2.25 sq mi (5.84 km^{2})
  - Land: 2.25 sq mi (5.83 km^{2})
  - Water: 0.0039 sq mi (0.01 km^{2})
- Elevation: 2,201 ft (671 m)

Population (2020)
  - Total: 125
  - Estimate (2022): 121
  - Density: 55.6/sq mi (21.45/km^{2})
- Time zone: UTC-6 (Central (CST))
  - Summer (DST): UTC-5 (CDT)
- ZIP code: 58769
- Area code: 701
- FIPS code: 38-60620
- GNIS feature ID: 1036212

Palermo (/ˈpælərmoʊ/ PAL-ər-moh) is a city in Mountrail County, North Dakota, United States. The population was 125 at the 2020 census.

== History ==
Palermo was founded in 1902. The city's name is a transfer from Palermo, in Sicily.

== Geography ==
According to the United States Census Bureau, the city has a total area of 2.21 square miles (5.72 km^{2}), all land.

== Demographics ==
Historical population
Census	Pop.	Note	%±
1910	177		—
1920	179		1.1%
1930	205		14.5%
1940	178		−13.2%
1950	150		−15.7%
1960	188		25.3%
1970	146		−22.3%
1980	97		−33.6%
1990	95		−2.1%
2000	77		−18.9%
2010	74		−3.9%
2020	125		68.9%
2022 (est.)	121		−3.2%
U.S. Decennial Census; 2020 Census

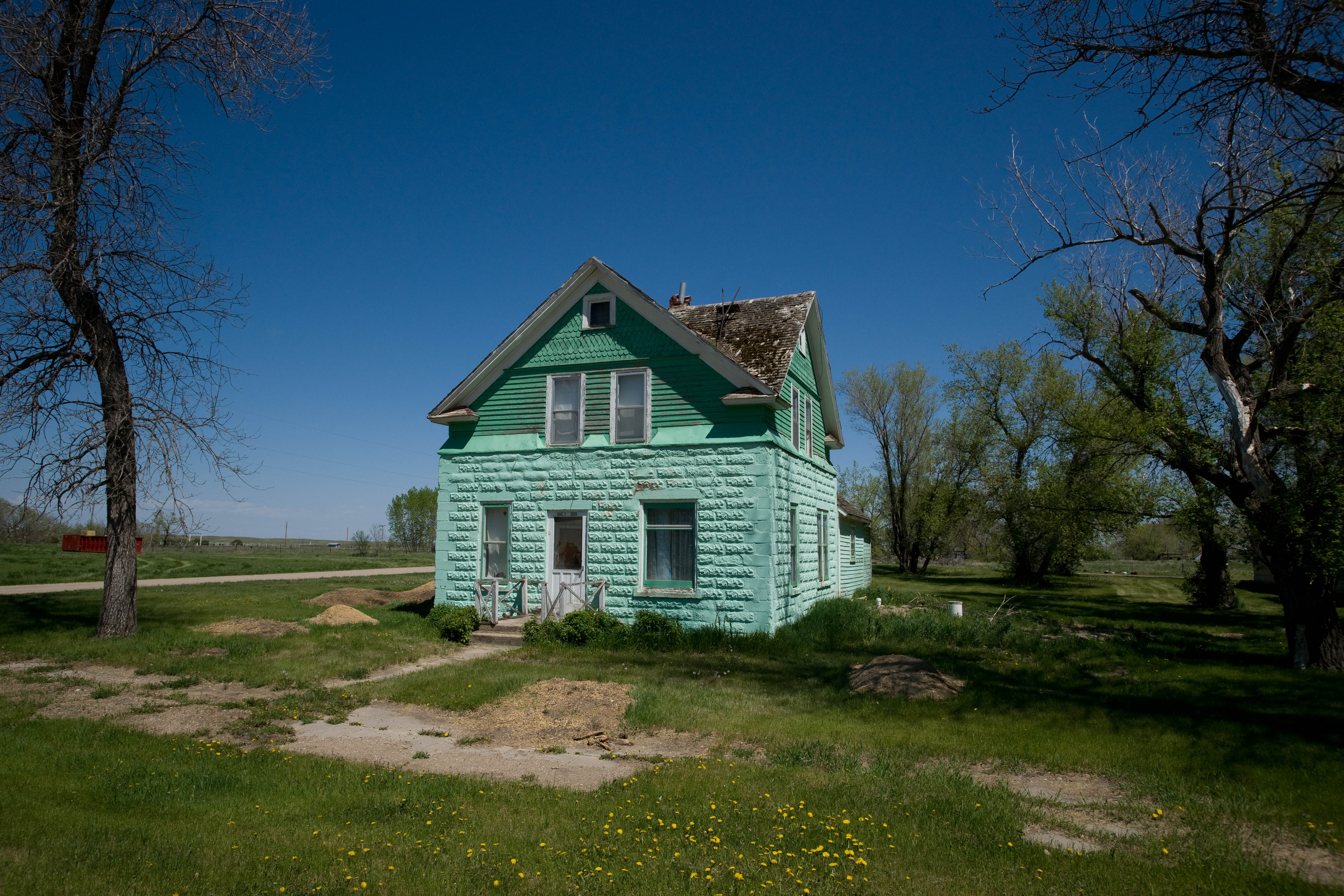
House in Palermo

=== 2010 census ===
As of the census of 2010, there were 74 people, 39 households, and 18 families residing in the city. The population density was 33.5 inhabitants per square mile (12.9/km^{2}). There were 67 housing units at an average density of 30.3 per square mile (11.7/km^{2}). The racial makeup of the city was 95.9% White, 1.4% African American, 1.4% Native American, and 1.4% from two or more races. Hispanic or Latino of any race were 1.4% of the population.

There were 39 households, of which 15.4% had children under the age of 18 living with them, 35.9% were married couples living together, 7.7% had a female householder with no husband present, 2.6% had a male householder with no wife present, and 53.8% were non-families. 51.3% of all households were made up of individuals, and 7.7% had someone living alone who was 65 years of age or older. The average household size was 1.90 and the average family size was 2.83.

The median age in the city was 49.5 years. 14.9% of residents were under the age of 18; 9.5% were between the ages of 18 and 24; 16.3% were from 25 to 44; 37.9% were from 45 to 64; and 21.6% were 65 years of age or older. The gender makeup of the city was 59.5% male and 40.5% female.

=== 2000 census ===
As of the census of 2000, there were 77 people, 38 households, and 22 families residing in the city. The population density was 35.2 inhabitants per square mile (13.6/km^{2}). There were 53 housing units at an average density of 24.2 per square mile (9.3/km^{2}). The racial makeup of the city was 97.40% White, 1.30% Asian, and 1.30% from two or more races.

There were 38 households, out of which 18.4% had children under the age of 18 living with them, 52.6% were married couples living together, 5.3% had a female householder with no husband present, and 39.5% were non-families. 39.5% of all households were made up of individuals, and 26.3% had someone living alone who was 65 years of age or older. The average household size was 2.03 and the average family size was 2.65.

In the city, the population was spread out, with 18.2% under the age of 18, 3.9% from 18 to 24, 18.2% from 25 to 44, 23.4% from 45 to 64, and 36.4% who were 65 years of age or older. The median age was 51 years. For every 100 females, there were 83.3 males. For every 100 females age 18 and over, there were 96.9 males.

The median income for a household in the city was $33,125, and the median income for a family was $35,313. Males had a median income of $27,500 versus $22,500 for females. The per capita income for the city was $14,028. There were no families and 2.4% of the population living below the poverty line, including no under eighteens and none of those over 64.

== Transportation ==
Amtrak's Empire Builder, which operates between Seattle/Portland and Chicago, passes through the town on BNSF tracks, but makes no stop. The nearest station is located in Stanley, 8 miles (13 km) to the west.

== Education ==
The school district is Stanley Public School District 2.

== See also ==
- List of cities in North Dakota
