= Four Bears Village, North Dakota =

- Census-designated place
- Interactive map of Four Bears Village, North Dakota
- Location within North Dakota
- Coordinates: 47.9871°N 102.5937°W
- Country: United States
- State: North Dakota
- County: McKenzie

Area
  - Total: 1.021 sq mi (2.645 km^{2})
  - Land: 1.021 sq mi (2.645 km^{2})
  - Water: 0 sq mi (0.000 km^{2}) 0.00%
- Elevation: 1,946 ft (593 m)

Population (2020)
  - Total: 500
  - Estimate (2025): 151
  - Density: 490/sq mi (190/km^{2})
- Time zone: UTC–6 (Central (CST))
  - Summer (DST): UTC–5 (CDT)
- ZIP Code: 58763
- Area code: 701
- FIPS code: 38-27950
- GNIS feature ID: 2393008
- Highway: ND 23

Four Bears Village is an unincorporated community and census-designated place (CDP) in McKenzie County, North Dakota, United States. The population was 500 as of the 2020 census, and was estimated at 151 in 2025.

== Geography ==
Four Bears Village is in eastern McKenzie County, just west of the Missouri River/Lake Sakakawea. It is on the north side of North Dakota Highway 23, which leads east across the Missouri River 4 miles (6 km) to New Town and west-southwest 45 miles (72 km) to Watford City.

According to the United States Census Bureau, the CDP has a total area of 1.021 square miles (2.64 km^{2}), all land.

== Demographics ==
Historical population
Census	Pop.	Note	%±
1990	309		—
2000	364		17.8%
2010	517		42.0%
2020	500		−3.3%
2025 (est.)	151		−69.8%
U.S. Decennial Census; 2020 Census

=== 2020 census ===
As of the 2020 census, there were 500 people, 146 households, and 132 families residing in the CDP. The population density was 489.72 inhabitants per square mile (189.1/km^{2}). There were 192 housing units at an average density of 188.05 per square mile (72.6/km^{2}). The racial makeup of the CDP was 4.80% White, 1.20% African American, 88.00% Native American, 0.60% Asian, 0.00% Pacific Islander, 0.40% from some other races and 5.00% from two or more races. Hispanic or Latino people of any race were 4.00% of the population.

=== 2010 census ===
As of the 2010 census, there were 517 people, 139 households, and 125 families residing in the CDP. The population density was 498.55 inhabitants per square mile (192.5/km^{2}). There were 155 housing units at an average density of 149.47 per square mile (57.7/km^{2}). The racial makeup of the CDP was 2.13% White, 0.00% African American, 96.32% Native American, 0.19% Asian, 0.00% Pacific Islander, 0.77% from some other races and 0.58% from two or more races. Hispanic or Latino people of any race were 1.93% of the population.

=== 2000 census ===
As of the 2000 census, there were 364 people, 87 households, and 80 families residing in the CDP. The population density was 348.83 inhabitants per square mile (134.7/km^{2}). There were 90 housing units at an average density of 86.25 per square mile (33.3/km^{2}). The racial makeup of the CDP was 4.12% White, 0.00% African American, 93.96% Native American, 0.00% Asian, 0.00% Pacific Islander, 0.00% from some other races and 1.92% from two or more races. Hispanic or Latino people of any race were 3.02% of the population.

There were 87 households, out of which 65.5% had children under the age of 18 living with them, 42.5% were married couples living together, 36.8% had a female householder with no husband present, and 8.0% were non-families. 6.9% of all households were made up of individuals, and 1.1% had someone living alone who was 65 years of age or older. The average household size was 4.18 and the average family size was 4.19.

In the CDP, the population was spread out, with 48.6% under the age of 18, 7.7% from 18 to 24, 29.1% from 25 to 44, 11.5% from 45 to 64, and 3.0% who were 65 years of age or older. The median age was 19 years. For every 100 females, there were 83.8 males. For every 100 females age 18 and over, there were 76.4 males.

The median income for a household in the CDP was $28,194, and the median income for a family was $26,250. Males had a median income of $29,125 versus $17,500 for females. The per capita income for the CDP was $7,681. About 35.7% of families and 31.2% of the population were below the poverty line, including 38.0% of those under age 18 and 50.0% of those age 65 or over.

== Education ==
The New Town Public School District 1 was organized in 1954.

- New Town High School (9-12) in New Town
- New Town Middle School (6-8) in New Town
- Edwin Loe Elementary (Preschool-5) in New Town

The area is served by the New Town Public School District 1. It operates the New Town School. In the 2025-26 academic year, the district reported a total of 960 students.
