= Wabek, North Dakota =

- Unincorporated community
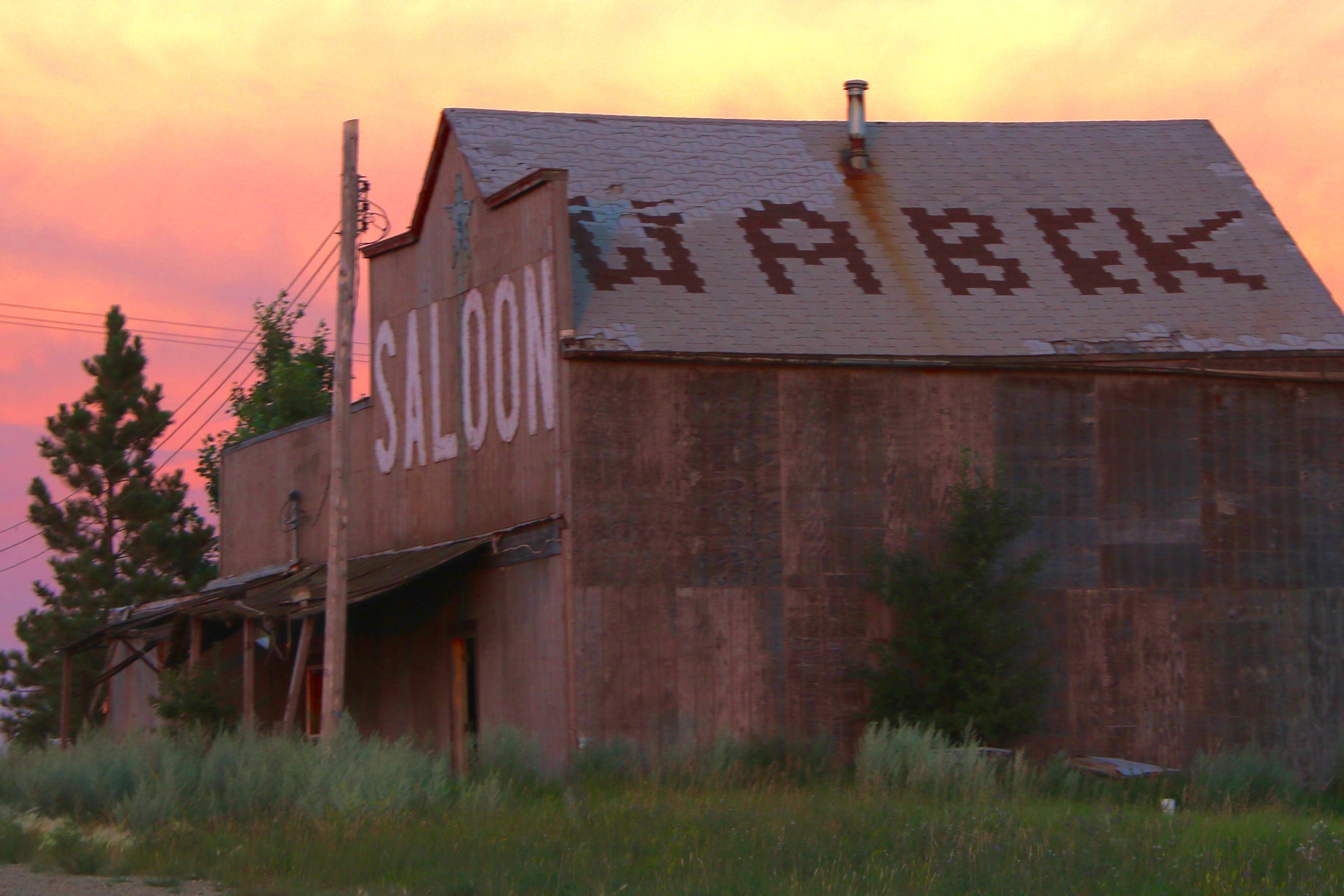
- Wabek Bar and Hotel in 2019

- Location within North Dakota Location within the United States
- Coordinates: 47°58′19″N 101°57′24″W
- Country: United States
- State: North Dakota
- County: Mountrail
- Elevation: 2,028 ft (618 m)
- Time zone: UTC-6 (Central (CST))
  - Summer (DST): UTC-5 (CDT)
- Area code: 701
- GNIS feature ID: 1032655

Wabek is an unincorporated community in the southeast corner of Mountrail County, North Dakota, United States. Wabek was founded shortly after the Soo Line laid their railroad tracks in the coulee directly north of the village. Since its inception, Wabek has served as the heart and hub of Plaza Township, as well as two Mountrail County townships to the south: Mountrail Township and Banner Township.

== Landmarks ==
In October 2019, Wabek Consolidated School was listed on the U.S. Department of the Interior's National Register of Historic Places. The schoolhouse was the centre-point in the community for much of the 20th century.
