= White Shield, North Dakota =

White Shield, North Dakota nahtasuutaaká (Arikara) maanaagi iixodagish (Hidatsa)
- CDP
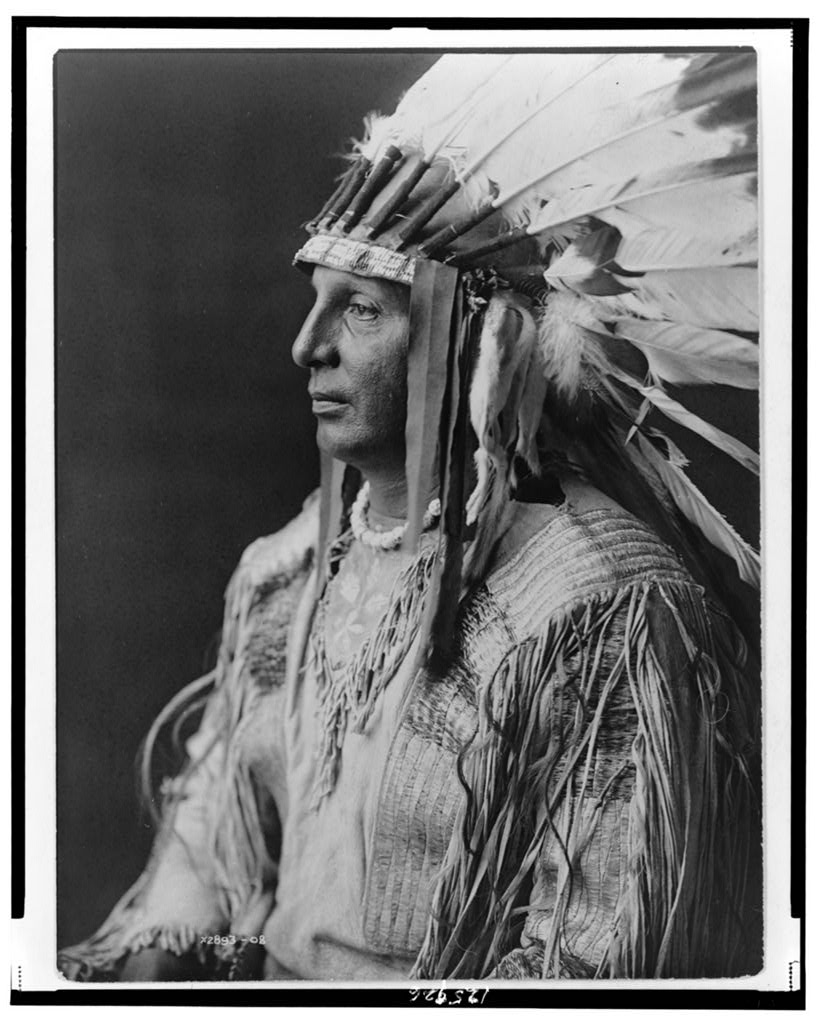
- White Shield in 1908
- Interactive map of White Shield, North Dakota
- Location within North Dakota
- Coordinates: 47.6602°N 101.8436°W
- Country: United States
- State: North Dakota
- County: McLean
- Founded: 1954
- Named for: Chief White Shield

Area
  - Total: 3.796 sq mi (9.831 km^{2})
  - Land: 3.796 sq mi (9.831 km^{2})
  - Water: 0 sq mi (0.000 km^{2}) 0.00%
- Elevation: 1,991 ft (607 m)

Population (2020)
  - Total: 363
  - Estimate (2025): 268
  - Density: 95.6/sq mi (36.9/km^{2})
- Time zone: UTC–6 (Central (CST))
  - Summer (DST): UTC–5 (CDT)
- ZIP Codes: 58540, 58775
- Area code: 701
- FIPS code: 38-85660
- GNIS feature ID: 2393855
- Highways: CR 7, ND 1804

White Shield (Arikara: nahtasuutaaká, Hidatsa: maanaagi iixodagish) is a census-designated place (CDP) lying within the boundaries of the Mandan, Hidatsa, and Arikara Nation. It is located on the Fort Berthold Indian Reservation in McLean County, North Dakota, United States. The population was 363 as of the 2020 census, and was estimated at 268 in 2025. It is considered the primary community of the Arikara (Sahnish) people and is named for Chief White Shield.

== History ==
White Shield was founded in 1954 to replace the town of Elbowoods (Arikara: hiswíkat), which was inundated by the creation of Lake Sakakawea. The name honors White Shield, an Arikara chief and a scout for General George Armstrong Custer.

== Geography ==
White Shield is in western McLean County, 6 miles (10 km) north of Lake Sakakawea, 20 miles (32 km) west of Garrison, and 25 miles (40 km) southeast of Parshall.

According to the United States Census Bureau, the CDP has a total area of 3.796 square miles (9.83 km^{2}), all land.

== Culture ==
As of 2014, White Shield's Arikara language speakers are active in language revitalization. The Arikara language is taught at Fort Berthold Community College, White Shield School, and at the Arikara Cultural Center.

== Demographics ==
Historical population
Census	Pop.	Note	%±
1990	274		—
2000	348		27.0%
2010	336		−3.4%
2020	363		8.0%
2025 (est.)	268		−26.2%
U.S. Decennial Census; 2020 Census

As of the 2024 American Community Survey, there were 78 estimated households in White Shield with an average of 3.15 persons per household. The CDP has a median household income of $68,750. Approximately 29.3% of the CDP's population lives at or below the poverty line. White Shield has an estimated 100.0% employment rate, with 23.2% of the population holding a bachelor's degree or higher and 91.6% holding a high school diploma. There were 103 housing units at an average density of 119.35 per square mile (46.1/km^{2}).

The top five reported languages (people were allowed to report up to two languages, thus the figures will generally add to more than 100%) were English (92.7%), Spanish (0.0%), Indo-European (0.0%), Asian and Pacific Islander (3.0%), and Other (4.3%).

The median age in the CDP was 33.2 years.

White Shield, North Dakota – racial and ethnic composition Note: the US Census treats Hispanic/Latino as an ethnic category. This table excludes Latinos from the racial categories and assigns them to a separate category. Hispanics/Latinos may be of any race.
Race / ethnicity (NH = non-Hispanic)	Pop. 2000	Pop. 2010	Pop. 2020	% 2000	% 2010	% 2020
White alone (NH)	3	7	16	0.86%	2.08%	4.41%
Black or African American alone (NH)	0	0	2	0.00%	0.00%	0.55%
Native American or Alaska Native alone (NH)	303	309	299	87.07%	91.96%	82.37%
Asian alone (NH)	0	0	8	0.00%	0.00%	2.20%
Pacific Islander alone (NH)	0	0	0	0.00%	0.00%	0.00%
Other race alone (NH)	0	0	0	0.00%	0.00%	0.00%
Mixed race or multiracial (NH)	1	2	20	0.29%	0.60%	5.51%
Hispanic or Latino (any race)	41	18	18	11.78%	5.36%	4.96%
Total	348	336	363	100.00%	100.00%	100.00%

=== 2020 census ===
As of the 2020 census, there were 363 people, 128 households, and 87 families residing in the CDP. The population density was 95.63 inhabitants per square mile (36.9/km^{2}). There were 183 housing units at an average density of 48.21 per square mile (18.6/km^{2}). The racial makeup of the CDP was 4.41% White, 0.55% African American, 86.23% Native American, 2.20% Asian, 0.00% Pacific Islander, 0.00% from some other races and 6.61% from two or more races. Hispanic or Latino people of any race were 4.96% of the population.

=== 2010 census ===
As of the 2010 census, there were 336 people, 102 households, and 76 families residing in the CDP. The population density was 88.51 inhabitants per square mile (34.2/km^{2}). There were 112 housing units at an average density of 29.50 per square mile (11.4/km^{2}). The racial makeup of the CDP was 2.08% White, 0.00% African American, 96.73% Native American, 0.00% Asian, 0.00% Pacific Islander, 0.60% from some other races and 0.60% from two or more races. Hispanic or Latino people of any race were 5.36% of the population.

=== 2000 census ===
As of the 2000 census, there were 348 people, 100 households, and 79 families residing in the CDP. The population density was 92.89 inhabitants per square mile (35.9/km^{2}). There were 108 housing units at an average density of 28.83 per square mile (11.1/km^{2}). The racial makeup of the CDP was 1.15% White, 0.00% African American, 98.56% Native American, 0.00% Asian, 0.00% Pacific Islander, 0.00% from some other races and 0.29% from two or more races. Hispanic or Latino people of any race were 11.78% of the population.

There were 100 households, out of which 52.0% had children under the age of 18 living with them, 33.0% were married couples living together, 33.0% had a female householder with no husband present, and 21.0% were non-families. 20.0% of all households were made up of individuals, and 5.0% had someone living alone who was 65 years of age or older. The average household size was 3.48 and the average family size was 3.89.

In the CDP, the population was spread out, with 43.1% under the age of 18, 10.6% from 18 to 24, 23.6% from 25 to 44, 17.5% from 45 to 64, and 5.2% who were 65 years of age or older. The median age was 23 years. For every 100 females, there were 86.1 males. For every 100 females age 18 and over, there were 88.6 males.

The median income for a household in the CDP was $15,625, and the median income for a family was $15,625. Males had a median income of $15,625 versus $12,159 for females. The per capita income for the CDP was $6,603. About 45.7% of families and 56.2% of the population were below the poverty line, including 68.8% of those under age 18 and 53.3% of those age 65 or over.

== Public safety ==
In 2020 the nearest fire station was in Garrison and the nearest police station was in New Town. In 2020 there were plans to establish a joint police and fire station.

== Education ==
The White Shield Public School District 85

- White Shield High School (9-12) in Roseglen
- White Shield Elementary School (PK-8) in Roseglen

The area is served by the White Shield School District 85. It operates the Roseglen School. In the 2025-26 academic year, the district reported a total of 194 students.

== Notable people ==
- Carol Juneau, former member of Montana House of Representatives and Montana Senate; born in Elbowoods
