= Lewis and Clark Public School District =

School district in North Dakota, USA

Address
- 401 4th Avenue NE Berthold, North Dakota, 58718; United States

District information
- Type: Public
- Grades: PreK–12
- NCES District ID: 3800058

Students and staff
- Students: 435
- Teachers: 37.92
- Staff: 33.34
- Student–teacher ratio: 11.47

Other information
- Website: www.lewisandclark.k12.nd.us

Lewis and Clark Public School District 161 is a school district headquartered in Berthold, North Dakota. The district is named after Lewis and Clark.

It operates two schools: Berthold Public School and NSP Public School, the latter in Plaza and serving Plaza and North Shore.

== History ==
The district formed on July 1, 2003 from the merger of the Berthold, North Shore, and Plaza school districts. In Berthold, the vote to approve the merger was 167-35. In North Shore, the vote was 178-64. In Plaza, the vote was 146-2. The North Shore district was based in Makoti.

In 2011 residents of northern McLean County and southern Ward County requested to the state that it re-assign 80,000 square feet (7,400 m^{2}) of land, or 125 sections of land, from Lewis and Clark to the Max School District.

== Area ==
The district has 875 square miles (2,270 km^{2}) of territory. In Ward County the district serves Berthold, Makoti, much of Carpio, and a section of Ryder. Within Mountrail County it serves Plaza.

It also serves sections of McLean County and Renville County.
