= Sanish, North Dakota =

- Unincorporated community
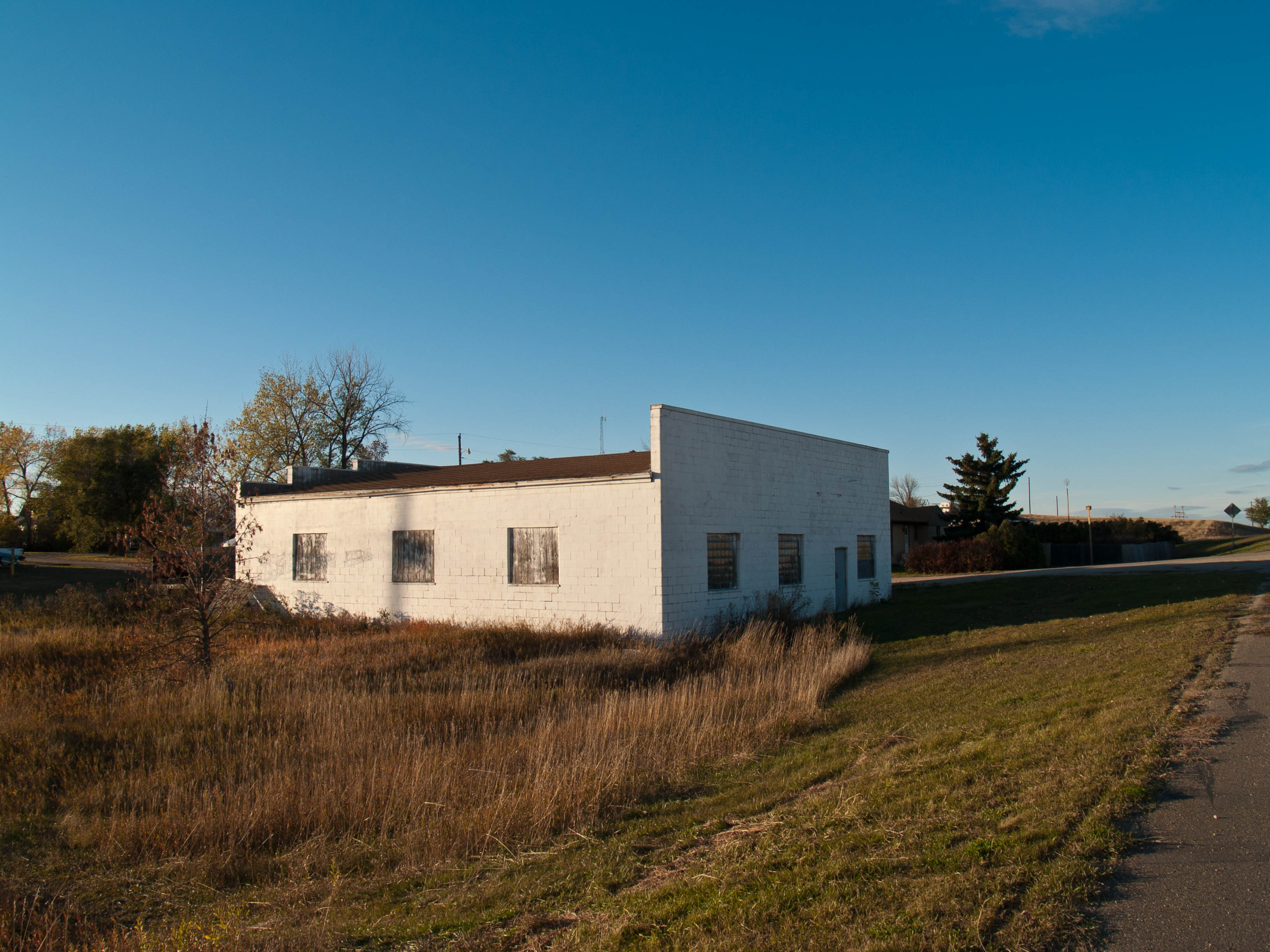
- Sanish in 2008

- Location within North Dakota Location within the United States
- Coordinates: 47°58′26″N 102°32′46″W
- Country: United States
- State: North Dakota
- County: Mountrail
- Elevation: 2,120 ft (650 m)
- Time zone: UTC-6 (Central (CST))
  - Summer (DST): UTC-5 (CDT)
- Area code: 701
- GNIS feature ID: 1031354

Sanish is an unincorporated community in Mountrail County, North Dakota, United States. Sanish is located along North Dakota Highway 23 and Lake Sakakawea, and 2.6 miles (4.2 km) west of New Town. Sanish was founded in 1915. The name, "Sanish" is an Arikara word meaning "real people" or "object". Native Americans also called the Sanish area "Old Crossing" because of the buffalo migrating through. The present community of Sanish was established in 1953, the same year when the original Sanish townsite was inundated by Lake Sakakawea. Old Sanish, as the original town is now known as, was a Native American community. After its evacuation, its residents moved to New Sanish and New Town.

== Old Sanish ==
In October 1914, a news article had announced that newly founded town of Sanish was going to have their townsite surveyed in Mountrail County. Three months later, in January 1915, a post office was registered named, "Sanish". Not too long after, their newspaper Sanish Sentinel was first published. The towns new Catholic church celebrated the first mass in August. Throughout 1915, Old Sanish had supported around 50 businesses, rewarding itself the title of "the city of ambition". The town had reached around 700 civilians and became important in shipping grain and livestock.

Near the end of 1949, property holders in the city suggested a new townsite to be lived in by Sanish and Van Hook residents, because the two towns were bound to be engulfed by the waters of the Lake Sakakawea project after construction of the Garrison Dam. After said proposal, the New Sanish Townsite was finished. In April 1953, plots of land were beginning to be sold, and that same spring the Sanish post office reopened in New Sanish. New Sanish had around 120 people living there now, and Old Sanish became submerged under Lake Sakakawea. Old Sanish was officially declared as abandoned on April 29th, 1953.
