= Van Hook, North Dakota =

- Unincorporated community
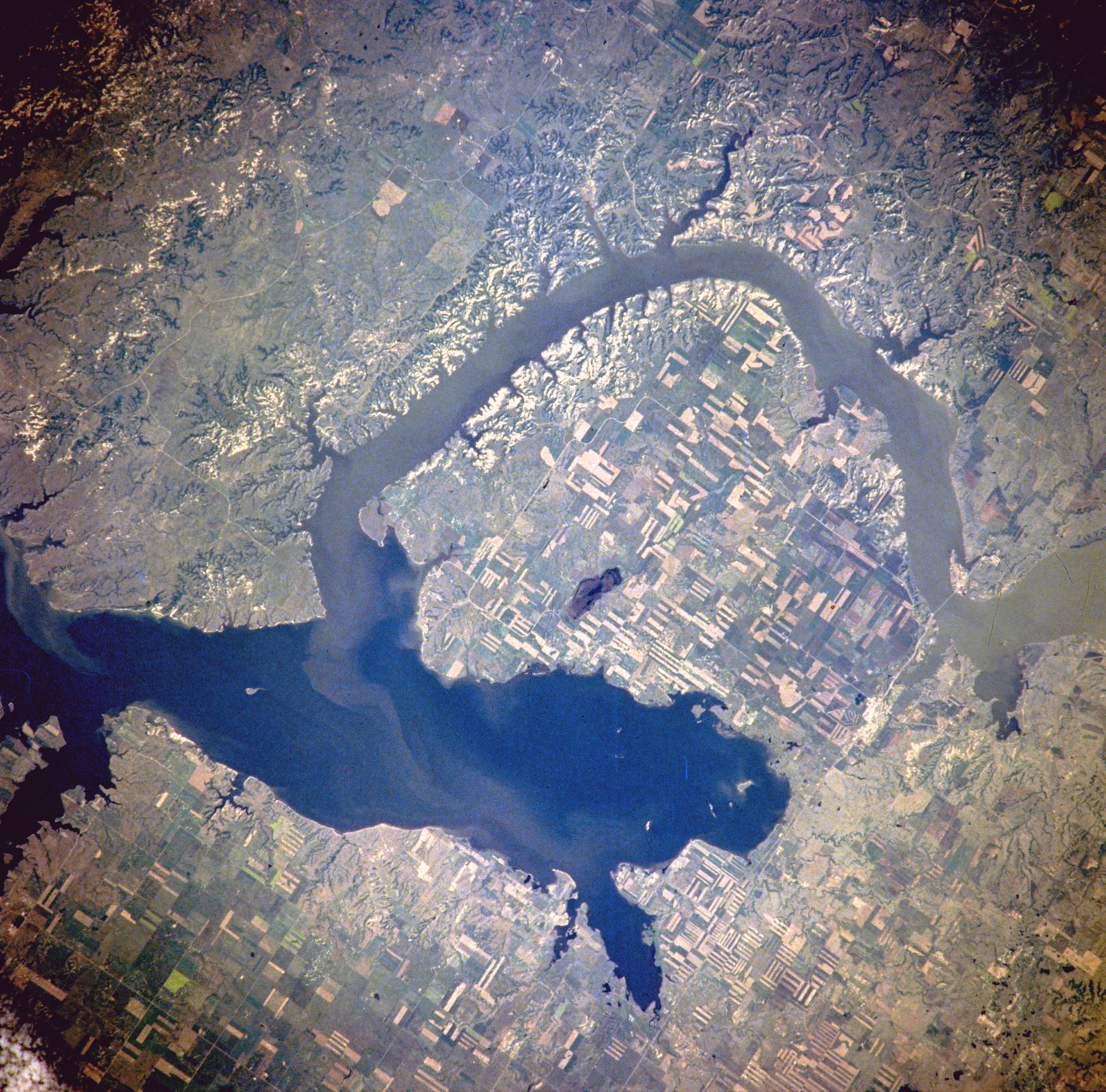
- Van Hook Arm (satellite image)
- Interactive map of Van Hook, North Dakota
- Coordinates: 47.945°N 102.36°W
- Country: United States
- State: North Dakota
- County: Mountrail
- Founded: 1914
- Incorporated: 1915
- Disincorporated: 1953
- Elevation: 1,850 ft (560 m)
- Time zone: UTC-6 (Central (CST))
  - Summer (DST): UTC-5 (CDT)
- Area code: 701

Location in the United States
Location in North Dakota

Van Hook is an unincorporated resort community built on the shores of Lake Sakakawea. The town was disbanded in the 1950s with the flooding of Lake Sakakawea and for a very short period of time was classified as a ghost town in the north central United States, located in Van Hook Township in Mountrail County, North Dakota. The original town site was mostly left not flooded when Lake Sakakawea was formed in the 1950s behind Garrison Dam.

The US government forced all Van Hook residents in the 1950s to give up their homes and move to New Town. The townsite for a short period of time was abandoned. However, since most of the old townsite was never actually flooded by Lake Sakakawea, the townsite and land nearby more recently has been turned into an unincorporated resort community still called Van Hook and with both a summer-only and a year-around permanent population. Lake Sakakawea's Van Hook Arm gets its name from the town.

== History ==
Van Hook was founded in 1914 as a station on the Soo Line Railroad. It is named after Fred van Hook, who was one of the first to survey the area in 1911. It was incorporated in 1915, and reported a population of 372 in 1930. In fact, the town grew so fast that it earned the nickname "The City of Speed."

When the Garrison Dam was built in the early 1950s, forming Lake Sakakawea, the town's original residents were relocated to New Town, which the government had built to house those displaced by the dam. Residents from Sanish, located in a place which is now usually completely underwater, also moved here. Another new unincorporated village called New Sanish has since reformed on higher dry land to the south of the original flooded Sanish townsite but still near Lake Sakakawea.

The original incorporated Van Hook town's last reported US Census population in 1950 was 380, prior to when, everyone was forced to move out by the federal government.

The Van Hook arm of Lake Sakakawea has always been very popular for recreational fishing, boating, and camping. The rebuilt resort town began a building process in the 1970s when it became obvious that most of the main townsite did not flood and would never be flooded by the waters of Lake Sakakawea, and some of the original townsite area was initially opened for camping trailers and other similar temporary summer living quarters. This begins a sequence of events in which year-round homes were eventually not only permitted but encouraged—leading eventually to the present town and the year-round Van Hook community. The present town continues to add residential areas to the north of the original townsite, and a secondary community of permanent homes a short distance to the north and west of the main townsite has also developed.

The precise current population of the unincorporated resort area/town or "new" Van Hook is not known, but in the summer with temporary residents might easily exceed the 1950 census number of 380.

== Education ==
There was previously a school in Van Hook, of the New Town School District.
