= Plaza, North Dakota =

- City
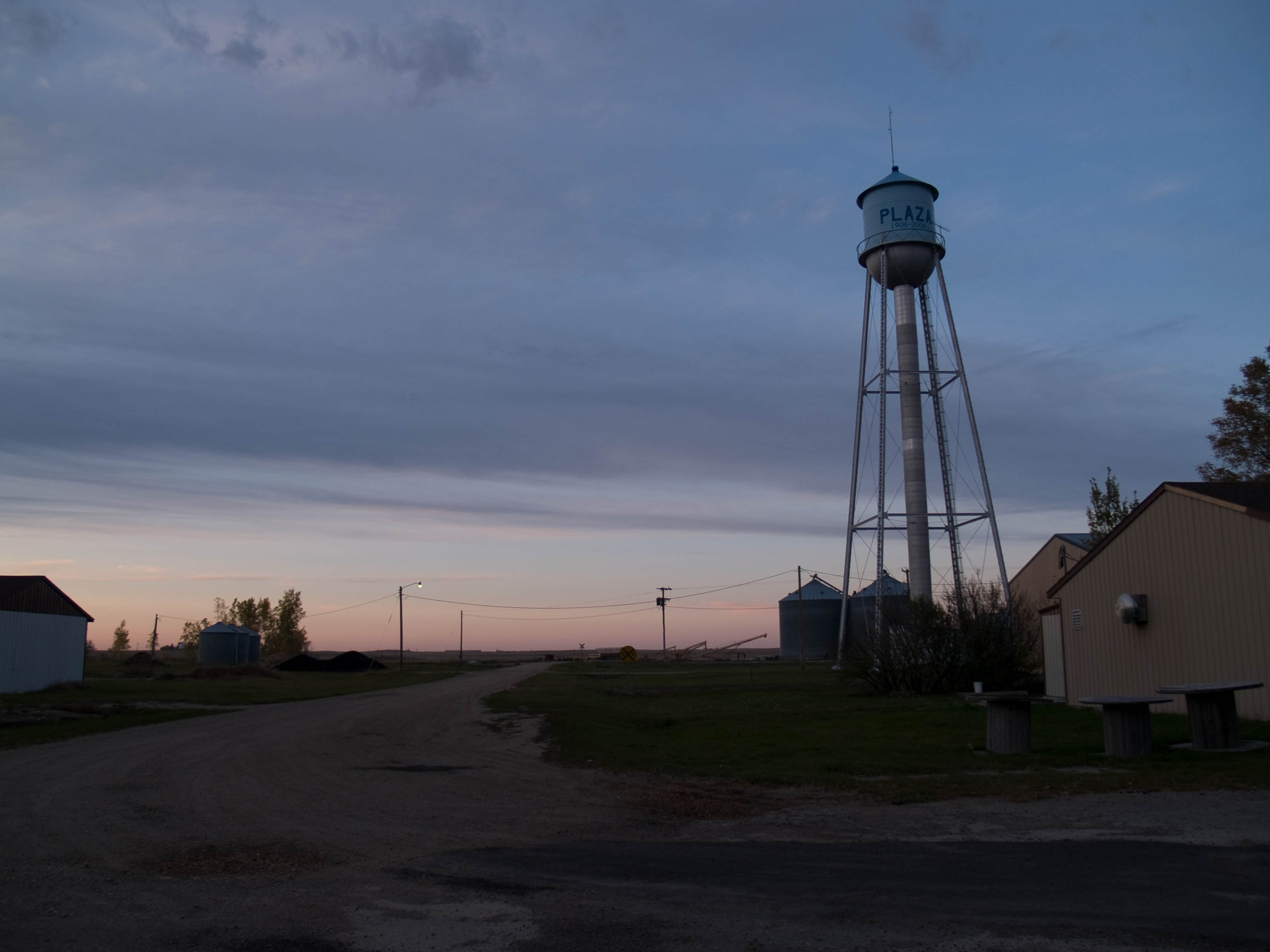
- Street in Plaza

- Logo

- Location of Plaza, North Dakota
- Coordinates: 48°01′34″N 101°57′34″W
- Country: United States
- State: North Dakota
- County: Mountrail
- Founded: 1906

Area
  - Total: 1.10 sq mi (2.84 km^{2})
  - Land: 1.08 sq mi (2.80 km^{2})
  - Water: 0.012 sq mi (0.03 km^{2})
- Elevation: 2,096 ft (639 m)

Population (2020)
  - Total: 211
  - Estimate (2022): 201
  - Density: 195.0/sq mi (75.28/km^{2})
- Time zone: UTC-6 (Central (CST))
  - Summer (DST): UTC-5 (CDT)
- ZIP code: 58771
- Area code: 701
- FIPS code: 38-62980
- GNIS feature ID: 1036224
- Website: plazand.com

Plaza is a city in Mountrail County, North Dakota, United States. The population was 211 at the 2020 census. Plaza was founded in 1906. The business district is built around a central town square, city park or "plaza". A key feature of the plaza is a recently completed large covered gazebo.

== Geography ==
According to the United States Census Bureau, the city has a total area of 1.13 square miles (2.93 km^{2}), of which 1.12 square miles (2.90 km^{2}) is land and 0.01 square miles (0.03 km^{2}) is water.

== Demographics ==
Historical population
Census	Pop.	Note	%±
1910	224		—
1920	345		54.0%
1930	408		18.3%
1940	360		−11.8%
1950	389		8.1%
1960	385		−1.0%
1970	291		−24.4%
1980	222		−23.7%
1990	193		−13.1%
2000	167		−13.5%
2010	171		2.4%
2020	211		23.4%
2022 (est.)	201		−4.7%
U.S. Decennial Census; 2020 Census

=== 2010 census ===
As of the census of 2010, there were 171 people, 84 households, and 41 families residing in the city. The population density was 152.7 inhabitants per square mile (59.0/km^{2}). There were 114 housing units at an average density of 101.8 per square mile (39.3/km^{2}). The racial makeup of the city was 93.0% White, 1.8% Native American, 2.9% from other races, and 2.3% from two or more races. Hispanic or Latino of any race were 6.4% of the population.

There were 84 households, of which 17.9% had children under the age of 18 living with them, 42.9% were married couples living together, 4.8% had a female householder with no husband present, 1.2% had a male householder with no wife present, and 51.2% were non-families. 46.4% of all households were made up of individuals, and 10.7% had someone living alone who was 65 years of age or older. The average household size was 2.04 and the average family size was 2.93.

The median age in the city was 47.5 years. 18.1% of residents were under the age of 18; 7.7% were between the ages of 18 and 24; 20.5% were from 25 to 44; 36.9% were from 45 to 64; and 17% were 65 years of age or older. The gender makeup of the city was 56.1% male and 43.9% female.

=== 2000 census ===
As of the census of 2000, there were 167 people, 80 households, and 47 families residing in the city. The population density was 148.7 inhabitants per square mile (57.4/km^{2}). There were 115 housing units at an average density of 102.4 per square mile (39.5/km^{2}). The racial makeup of the city was 91.02% White, 8.38% Native American and 0.60% Asian.

There were 80 households, out of which 25.0% had children under the age of 18 living with them, 50.0% were married couples living together, 6.3% had a female householder with no husband present, and 41.3% were non-families. 38.8% of all households were made up of individuals, and 25.0% had someone living alone who was 65 years of age or older. The average household size was 2.09 and the average family size was 2.77.

In the city, the population was spread out, with 23.4% under the age of 18, 3.0% from 18 to 24, 27.5% from 25 to 44, 19.2% from 45 to 64, and 26.9% who were 65 years of age or older. The median age was 43 years. For every 100 females, there were 116.9 males. For every 100 females age 18 and over, there were 109.8 males.

The median income for a household in the city was $22,143, and the median income for a family was $29,063. Males had a median income of $24,107 versus $14,375 for females. The per capita income for the city was $14,356. About 4.1% of families and 7.3% of the population were below the poverty line, including none of those under the age of eighteen and 26.7% of those 65 or over.

== Education ==
It is within the Lewis and Clark School District, which formed in 2003 when the Plaza School District merged with two other districts. There is a school in Plaza, NSP Public School.
