= Shell Lake National Wildlife Refuge =

Protected area in North Dakota, United States

- IUCN category IV (habitat/species management area)
- Location within the United States
- Location: Mountrail County, North Dakota, United States
- Nearest city: Stanley, ND
- Coordinates: 48°11′13″N 102°06′45″W
- Area: 1,835 acres (743 ha)
- Established: 1939
- Governing body: U.S. Fish and Wildlife Service
- Website: Shell Lake National Wildlife Refuge

Shell Lake National Wildlife Refuge is a 1,835-acre (743 ha) National Wildlife Refuge in the U.S. state of North Dakota. Though wildlife viewing is allowed, hunting and fishing are prohibited. The refuge is managed by the Lostwood Wetland Management District.
