= New Town Public Schools =

School district in North Dakota, USA

New Town School District 1, also known as New Town Public Schools, is a school district headquartered in New Town, North Dakota. It operates Edwin Loe Elementary School and New Town High School (middle and high school).

In Mountrail County it serves New Town, and within McKenzie County it serves Four Bears Village. The Van Hook area in Mountrail County is also in the New Town district.

== History ==
Previously a separate school was in Van Hook. In 1952 there was a walkout from the Van Hook school to protest the fact that the school district was not permitted to use the village hall. After the walkout the school district was permitted the usage of the hall.

In 1970 the U.S. Office of Education gave the district a $9,600 grant through Title One rules.

In December 1997 the high school administration dealt with constant fights by buying $6,000 worth of security cameras.

== Student body ==
In 1998, 80% of the students were Native American.
