= Van Hook State Wildlife Management Area =

Protected area in North Dakota, United States

Coordinates: 47°58′12″N 102°16′32″W

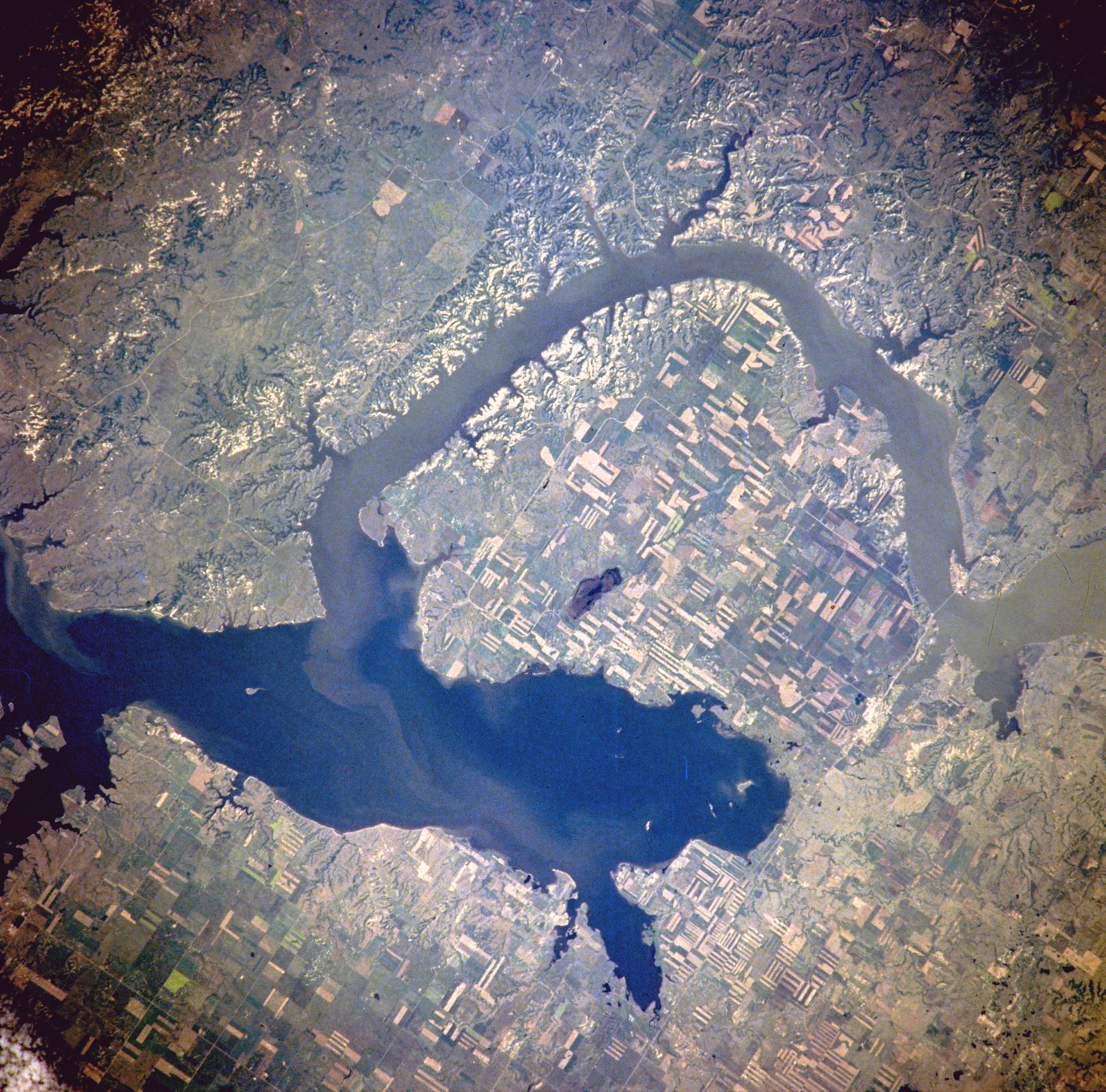
Small bay below center is the northern tip of the protected section of the "Van Hook Arm"

Van Hook State Wildlife Management Area is a Wildlife Management Area on the Van Hook Arm of Lake Sakakawea in Mountrail County, North Dakota. The Van Hook Arm of Lake Sakakawea is managed by a different county than the Garrison Dam which formed it. The closest town to the WMA is New Town, North Dakota and the Soo Line Railroad runs through it on its way to Parshall, North Dakota.
