= Sikes Township, Mountrail County, North Dakota =

Civil township in North Dakota, U.S.

Coordinates: 48°09′20″N 102°20′44″W

Sikes Township is a civil township in Mountrail County, North Dakota, United States.
