= Mountrail County, North Dakota =

County in North Dakota, United States

- County
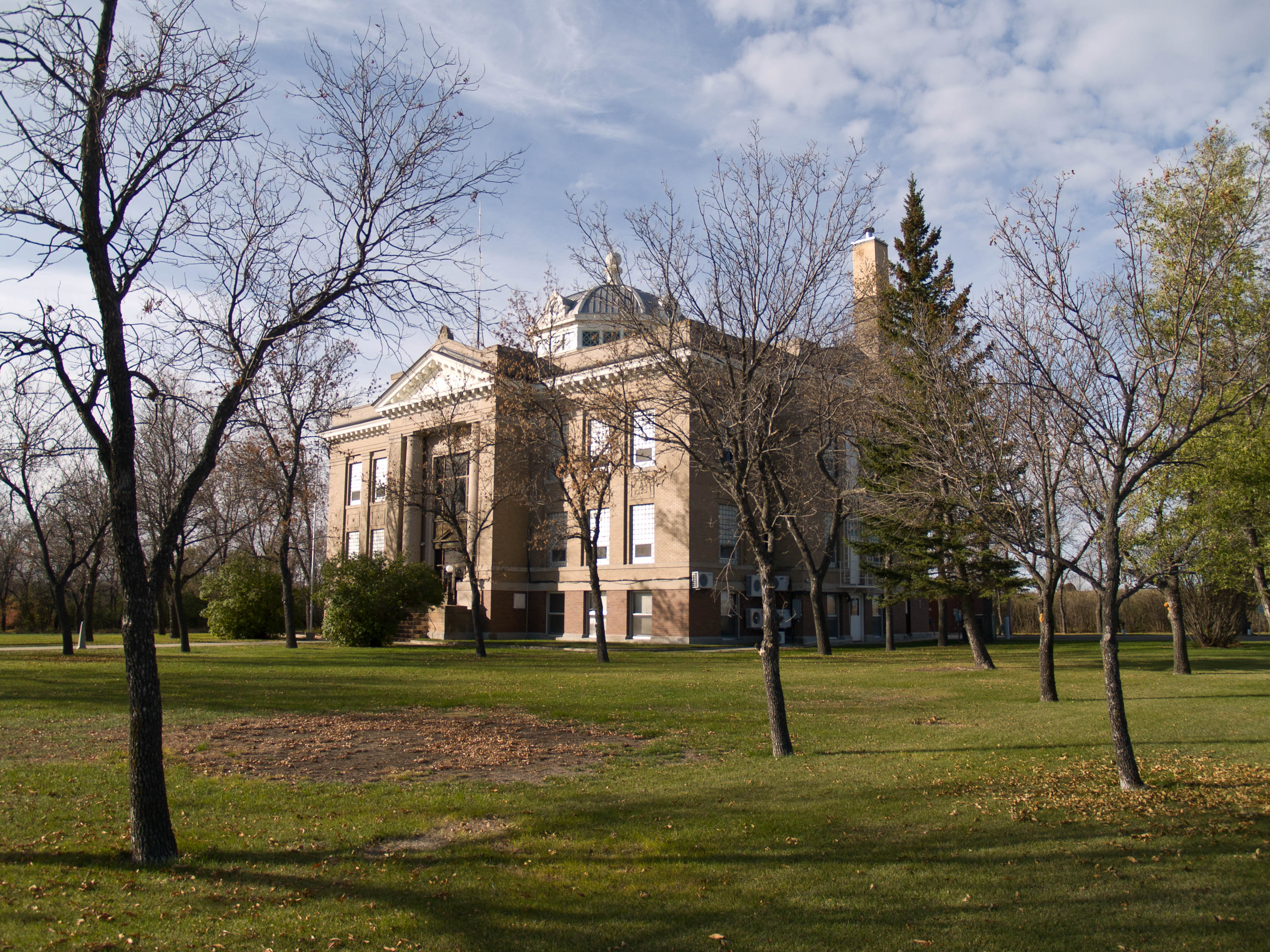
- Mountrail County Courthouse in Stanley

- Location within the U.S. state of North Dakota
- Coordinates: 48°12′35″N 102°21′55″W
- Country: United States
- State: North Dakota
- Founded: January 4, 1873 (created); November 8, 1892 (eliminated); January 16, 1909 (re-created); January 29, 1909 (organized)
- Seat: Stanley
- Largest city: New Town

Area
  - Total: 1,941.419 sq mi (5,028.25 km^{2})
  - Land: 1,825.163 sq mi (4,727.15 km^{2})
  - Water: 116.256 sq mi (301.10 km^{2}) 5.99%

Population (2020)
  - Total: 9,809
  - Estimate (2025): 9,395 ▼
  - Density: 5.19/sq mi (2.00/km^{2})
- Time zone: UTC−6 (Central)
  - Summer (DST): UTC−5 (CDT)
- Area code: 701
- Congressional district: At-large
- Website: co.mountrail.nd.us

Mountrail County is a county in the northwestern part of North Dakota, United States. As of the 2020 census, the population was 9,809, and was estimated to be 9,395 in 2025. The county seat is Stanley and the largest city is New Town.

The county was originally created in 1873, then removed in 1892, and annexed by Ward County. It was re-created and organized in 1909.

The county is home to the headquarters of the Three Affiliated Tribes of the Mandan, Hidatsa, and Arikara people, and a large part of the county belongs to the tribe's Fort Berthold reservation.

== History ==
The Dakota Territory legislature created the county (as Mountraille County) on January 4, 1873, with an area annexed from Buffalo County. The origin of its name came from Joseph Mountraille, a locally famed Metis voyageur and mail carrier from Pembina under Norman Kittson's employment. The county was not organized at that time, nor was it attached to another county for administrative or judicial purposes. The new county lost territory in 1885 when a portion was annexed off to create Garfield County (now extinct). This situation continued until February 21, 1891, when Mountrail County was attached to Ward County for "judicial and other purposes." The following year (November 8, 1892), the North Dakota legislature voted to dissolve the county and have its territory absorbed by Ward County.

An election held in Ward County on November 3, 1908, authorized the re-creation of Mountrail County, although with different boundaries than the previous county proposal. The countywide vote totals were 4207 to 4024, but the result was contested in court. On January 16, 1909, the state Supreme Court upheld the vote, so the county government was organized on January 29 of that year.

Oil production from the Bakken formation in the early 21st century attracted workers and reversed decades of population decline in the county. From 2010 to 2015, especially, population markedly increased, creating its own strains.

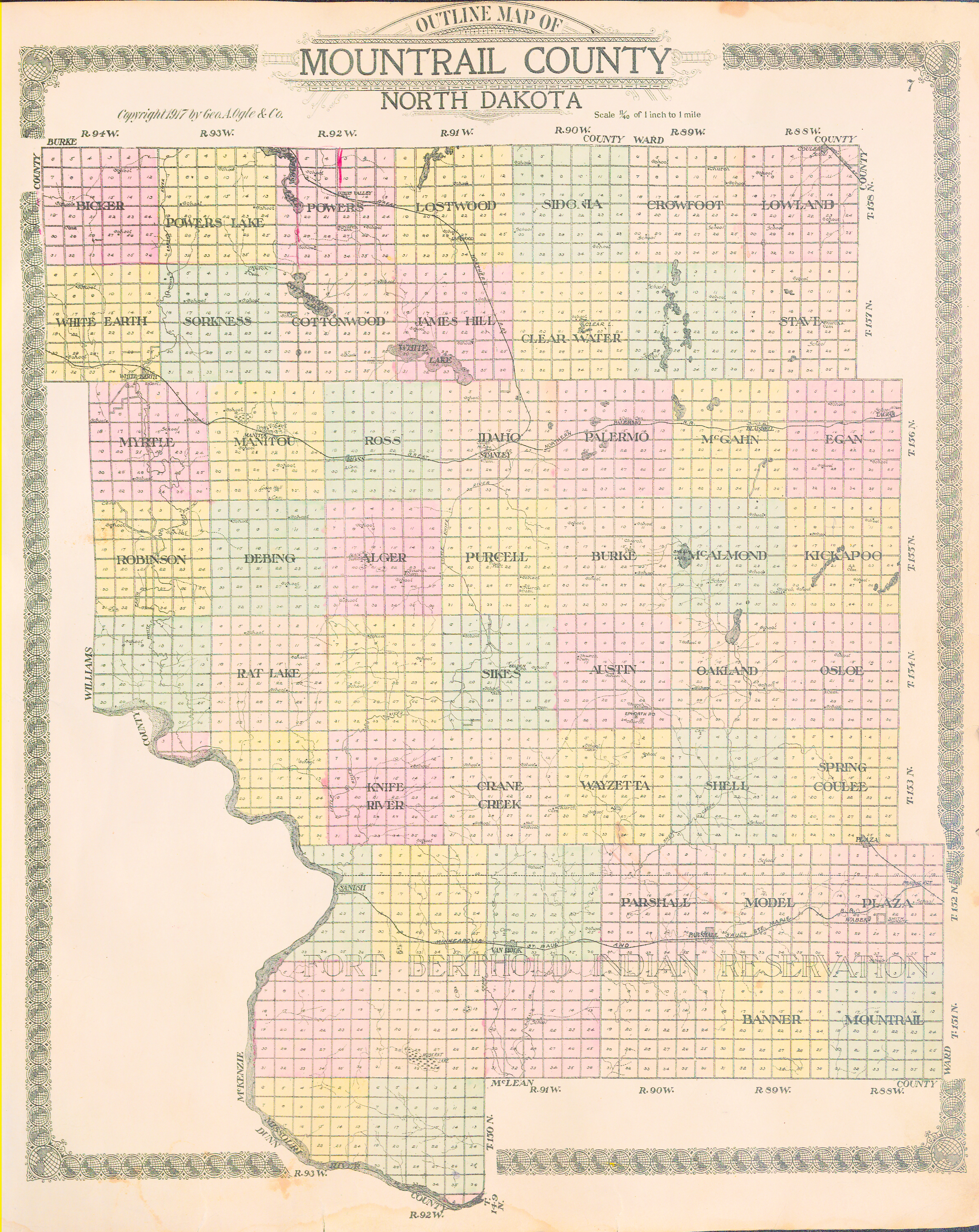
Outline map of Mountrail County, North Dakota, 1917

== Geography ==
The Missouri River flows southeastward along the SW boundary line of Mountrail County, and Shell Creek drains the lower central part of the county into the Missouri, discharging at Shell Creek Bay. The terrain consists of rolling hills, largely devoted to agriculture. Its NE portion is dotted with ponds and lakes. The Laurentian Divide runs east–west through the central part of the county, with the northern areas sloping to the north and the southern areas sloping to the south. Its highest point is on the upper west boundary line, at 2,480 ft (760 m) ASL.

According to the United States Census Bureau, the county has a total area of 1,941.419 square miles (5,028.25 km^{2}), of which 1,825.163 square miles (4,727.15 km^{2}) is land and 116.256 square miles (301.10 km^{2}) (5.99%) is water. It is the 9th largest county in North Dakota by total area.

Mountrail County is one of several western North Dakota counties with significant exposure to the Bakken Formation in the Williston Basin.

=== Major highways ===
- U.S. Highway 2
- North Dakota Highway 8
- North Dakota Highway 23
- North Dakota Highway 37
- North Dakota Highway 1804

=== Transit ===
- Amtrak Empire Builder (Stanley station)

=== Adjacent counties ===
- Burke County - north
- Ward County - east
- McLean County - southeast
- Dunn County - south
- McKenzie County - southwest
- Williams County - west

=== Protected areas ===
- Crow Flies High Butte
- Lostwood National Wildlife Refuge (part)
- Palermo State Game Management Area
- Reunion Point Public Use Area
- Shell Lake National Wildlife Refuge
- Van Hook State Game Management Area
- Van Hook State Wildlife Management Area

=== Lakes ===
- Cottonwood Lake
- Lake Sakakawea
- Powers Lake (part)
- Rat Lake
- Robinson Lake
- Shell Lake
- Van Hook Arm
- White Lake

== Demographics ==
Historical population
Census	Pop.	Note	%±
1910	8,491		—
1920	12,140		43.0%
1930	13,544		11.6%
1940	10,482		−22.6%
1950	9,418		−10.2%
1960	10,077		7.0%
1970	8,437		−16.3%
1980	7,679		−9.0%
1990	7,021		−8.6%
2000	6,631		−5.6%
2010	7,673		15.7%
2020	9,809		27.8%
2025 (est.)	9,395	▼	−4.2%
U.S. Decennial Census; 1790–1960 1900–1990; 1990–2000 2010–2020

As of the fourth quarter of 2024, the median home value in Mountrail County was $235,433.

As of the 2023 American Community Survey, there are 3,839 estimated households in Mountrail County with an average of 2.46 persons per household. The county has a median household income of $81,292. Approximately 11.6% of the county's population lives at or below the poverty line. Mountrail County has an estimated 63.3% employment rate, with 22.4% of the population holding a bachelor's degree or higher and 88.6% holding a high school diploma.

The top five reported ancestries (people were allowed to report up to two ancestries, thus the figures will generally add to more than 100%) were English (88.5%), Spanish (6.5.%), Indo-European (1.0%), Asian and Pacific Islander (0.4%), and Other (3.6%).

The median age in the county was 35.1 years.

Mountrail County, North Dakota – racial and ethnic composition
Note: the US Census treats Hispanic/Latino as an ethnic category. This table excludes Latinos from the racial categories and assigns them to a separate category. Hispanics/Latinos may be of any race.

Race / ethnicity (NH = non-Hispanic)	Pop. 1980	Pop. 1990	Pop. 2000	Pop. 2010	Pop. 2020
White alone (NH)	6,724 (87.56%)	5,591 (79.63%)	4,358 (65.72%)	4,931 (64.26%)	5,539 (56.47%)
Black or African American alone (NH)	1 (0.01%)	4 (0.06%)	6 (0.09%)	16 (0.21%)	113 (1.15%)
Native American or Alaska Native alone (NH)	917 (11.94%)	1,387 (19.76%)	1,935 (29.18%)	2,240 (29.19%)	2,737 (27.90%)
Asian alone (NH)	15 (0.20%)	14 (0.20%)	14 (0.21%)	15 (0.20%)	105 (1.07%)
Pacific Islander alone (NH)	—	—	3 (0.05%)	1 (0.01%)	3 (0.03%)
Other race alone (NH)	3 (0.04%)	0 (0.00%)	1 (0.02%)	6 (0.08%)	34 (0.35%)
Mixed race or multiracial (NH)	—	—	227 (3.42%)	178 (2.32%)	510 (5.20%)
Hispanic or Latino (any race)	19 (0.25%)	25 (0.36%)	87 (1.31%)	286 (3.73%)	768 (7.83%)
Total	7,679 (100.00%)	7,021 (100.00%)	6,631 (100.00%)	7,673 (100.00%)	9,809 (100.00%)

=== 2024 estimate ===
As of the 2024 estimate, there were 9,474 people and 3,839 households residing in the county. There were 5,176 housing units at an average density of 2.84 per square mile (1.1/km^{2}). The racial makeup of the county was 62.9% White (57.5% NH White), 2.0% African American, 30.4% Native American, 1.0% Asian, 0.1% Pacific Islander, _% from some other races and 3.7% from two or more races. Hispanic or Latino people of any race were 8.9% of the population.

=== 2020 census ===
As of the 2020 census, there were 9,809 people, 3,715 households, and 2,407 families residing in the county. The population density was 5.4 inhabitants per square mile (2.1/km^{2}).

Of the residents, 27.9% were under the age of 18 and 13.5% were 65 years of age or older; the median age was 35.0 years. For every 100 females there were 109.3 males, and for every 100 females age 18 and over there were 112.3 males.

The racial makeup of the county was 58.2% White, 1.2% Black or African American, 29.0% American Indian and Alaska Native, 1.1% Asian, 2.5% from some other race, and 8.1% from two or more races. Hispanic or Latino residents of any race comprised 7.8% of the population.

There were 3,715 households in the county, of which 35.5% had children under the age of 18 living with them and 21.0% had a female householder with no spouse or partner present. About 28.4% of all households were made up of individuals and 8.5% had someone living alone who was 65 years of age or older.

There were 5,018 housing units, of which 26.0% were vacant. Among occupied housing units, 60.6% were owner-occupied and 39.4% were renter-occupied. The homeowner vacancy rate was 2.6% and the rental vacancy rate was 21.5%.

=== 2010 census ===
As of the 2010 census, there were 7,673 people, 2,793 households, and 1,852 families residing in the county. The population density was 4.2 inhabitants per square mile (1.6/km^{2}). There were 4,117 housing units at an average density of 2.26 per square mile (0.9/km^{2}). The racial makeup of the county was 65.55% White, 0.21% African American, 30.60% Native American, 0.20% Asian, 0.01% Pacific Islander, 0.81% from some other races and 2.55% from two or more races. Hispanic or Latino people of any race were 3.73% of the population.

In terms of ancestry, 36.6% were Norwegian, 24.4% were German, 6.6% were Irish, and 0.8% were American.

There were 2,793 households, 31.1% had children under the age of 18 living with them, 48.3% were married couples living together, 11.4% had a female householder with no husband present, 33.7% were non-families, and 28.3% of all households were made up of individuals. The average household size was 2.55 and the average family size was 3.11. The median age was 37.0 years.

The median income for a household in the county was $53,912 and the median income for a family was $63,238. Males had a median income of $43,386 versus $29,432 for females. The per capita income for the county was $25,762. About 13.5% of families and 16.5% of the population were below the poverty line, including 24.2% of those under age 18 and 14.2% of those age 65 or over.

== Communities ==
=== Cities ===
- New Town
- Palermo
- Parshall
- Plaza
- Ross
- Stanley (county seat)
- White Earth

=== Unincorporated communities ===
- Belden
- Blaisdell
- Coulee
- Lostwood
- Lunds Valley
- Prairie Junction
- Sanish
- Tagus
- Van Hook
- Wabek Wabek Consolidated School

== Government ==
Aspects of county government are subdivided into townships.

=== Townships ===
- Alger
- Austin
- Banner
- Bicker
- Big Bend
- Brookbank
- Burke
- Clearwater
- Cottonwood
- Crane Creek
- Crowfoot
- Debing
- Egan
- Fertile
- Howie
- Idaho
- James Hill
- Kickapoo
- Knife River
- Liberty
- Lostwood
- Lowland
- Manitou
- McAlmond
- McGahan
- Model
- Mountrail
- Myrtle
- Oakland
- Osborn
- Osloe
- Palermo
- Parshall
- Plaza
- Powers
- Powers Lake
- Purcell
- Rat Lake
- Redmond
- Ross
- Shell
- Sidonia
- Sikes
- Sorkness
- Spring Coulee
- Stave
- Van Hook
- Wayzetta
- White Earth

== Politics ==
Mountrail County was historically a swing county but now leans strongly Republican. Bill Clinton won the county in both of his successful runs (1992 and 1996), and Barack Obama did so too in the 2008 election. However, he wasn't able to carry this county in 2012, falling to Republican Mitt Romney by over 16%. Kamala Harris received the smallest vote percentage for a Democratic candidate (27.6%) since Progressive Party candidate Robert La Follette received overwhelming support from Mountrail County in 1924.

United States presidential election results for Mountrail County, North Dakota
Year	Republican		Democratic		Third party(ies)	
Year	No.	%	No.	%	No.	%
1912	407	28.05%	307	21.16%	737	50.79%
1916	740	32.64%	1,262	55.67%	265	11.69%
1920	2,960	72.73%	687	16.88%	423	10.39%
1924	1,354	36.19%	130	3.48%	2,257	60.33%
1928	2,354	52.30%	2,003	44.50%	144	3.20%
1932	986	22.17%	3,284	73.83%	178	4.00%
1936	700	14.68%	2,775	58.19%	1,294	27.13%
1940	1,981	44.67%	2,392	53.93%	62	1.40%
1944	1,666	45.11%	1,981	53.64%	46	1.25%
1948	1,395	42.22%	1,521	46.04%	388	11.74%
1952	2,516	62.93%	1,437	35.94%	45	1.13%
1956	1,699	47.23%	1,891	52.57%	7	0.19%
1960	1,894	45.50%	2,264	54.38%	5	0.12%
1964	1,131	30.71%	2,548	69.18%	4	0.11%
1968	1,494	44.33%	1,662	49.32%	214	6.35%
1972	2,038	58.30%	1,391	39.79%	67	1.92%
1976	1,430	38.57%	2,189	59.03%	89	2.40%
1980	2,165	60.36%	1,183	32.98%	239	6.66%
1984	1,959	55.11%	1,565	44.02%	31	0.87%
1988	1,443	41.73%	1,977	57.17%	38	1.10%
1992	1,017	30.92%	1,393	42.35%	879	26.73%
1996	965	36.90%	1,277	48.83%	373	14.26%
2000	1,466	50.62%	1,256	43.37%	174	6.01%
2004	1,527	50.40%	1,465	48.35%	38	1.25%
2008	1,406	47.86%	1,477	50.27%	55	1.87%
2012	1,962	56.75%	1,403	40.58%	92	2.66%
2016	2,582	62.88%	1,220	29.71%	304	7.40%
2020	2,824	67.80%	1,256	30.16%	85	2.04%
2024	2,877	70.64%	1,125	27.62%	71	1.74%

== Education ==
School districts include:

- Kenmare Public School District 28 in Kenmare
- Lewis and Clark Public School District 161 in Berthold
- New Town Public School District 1 in New Town
- Parshall Public School District 3 in Parshall
- Powers Lake Public School District 27 in Powers Lake
- Stanley Public School District 2 in Stanley
- Tioga Public School District 15 in Tioga

== See also ==
- National Register of Historic Places listings in Mountrail County, North Dakota
