= Fort Berthold Indian Reservation =

- Indian reservation
- Seal

- Location in North Dakota
- Coordinates: 47°44′35″N 102°16′39″W
- Tribe: Mandan, Hidatsa, and Arikara Nation
- Country: United States
- State: North Dakota
- Counties: Dunn; McKenzie; McLean; Mercer; Mountrail; Ward
- Headquarters: New Town

Government
  - Body: Three Affiliated Tribes Business Council
  - Chairman: Mark N. Fox
  - Vice-Chairman: Randy Phelan

Population (2017)
  - Total: 7,304
- Website: mhanation.com

The Fort Berthold Indian Reservation is a U.S. Indian reservation in western North Dakota that is home for the federally recognized Mandan, Hidatsa, and Arikara Nation, also known as the Three Affiliated Tribes. The reservation includes lands on both sides of the Missouri River. The tribal headquarters is in New Town, the 18th largest city in North Dakota.

Created in 1870, the reservation is a small part of the lands originally reserved to the tribes by the Fort Laramie Treaty of 1851, which allocated nearly 12 million acres (49,000 km^{2}) in North Dakota, South Dakota, Montana, Nebraska and Wyoming.

== Description and demographics ==
The reservation is located on the Missouri River in (in descending order of reservation land) McLean, Mountrail, Dunn, McKenzie, Mercer and Ward counties. The reservation consists of 988,000 acres (4,000 km^{2}), of which 457,837 acres (1,853 km^{2}) are owned by Native Americans, either as individual allotments or communally by the tribe. The McLean National Wildlife Refuge lies within its boundaries.

The Tribe reported a total enrollment of 15,013 registered tribe members in March 2016. Many members live in cities because there are more job opportunities. Unemployment on the reservation was at 42%. The 2000 census reported a reservation population of 5,915 persons living on a land area of 1,318.895 sq mi (3,415.923 km²). The population of the reservation was 6,341 as of the 2010 census.

Map of the Fort Berthold Reservation and nearby reservations (In red).

== History ==
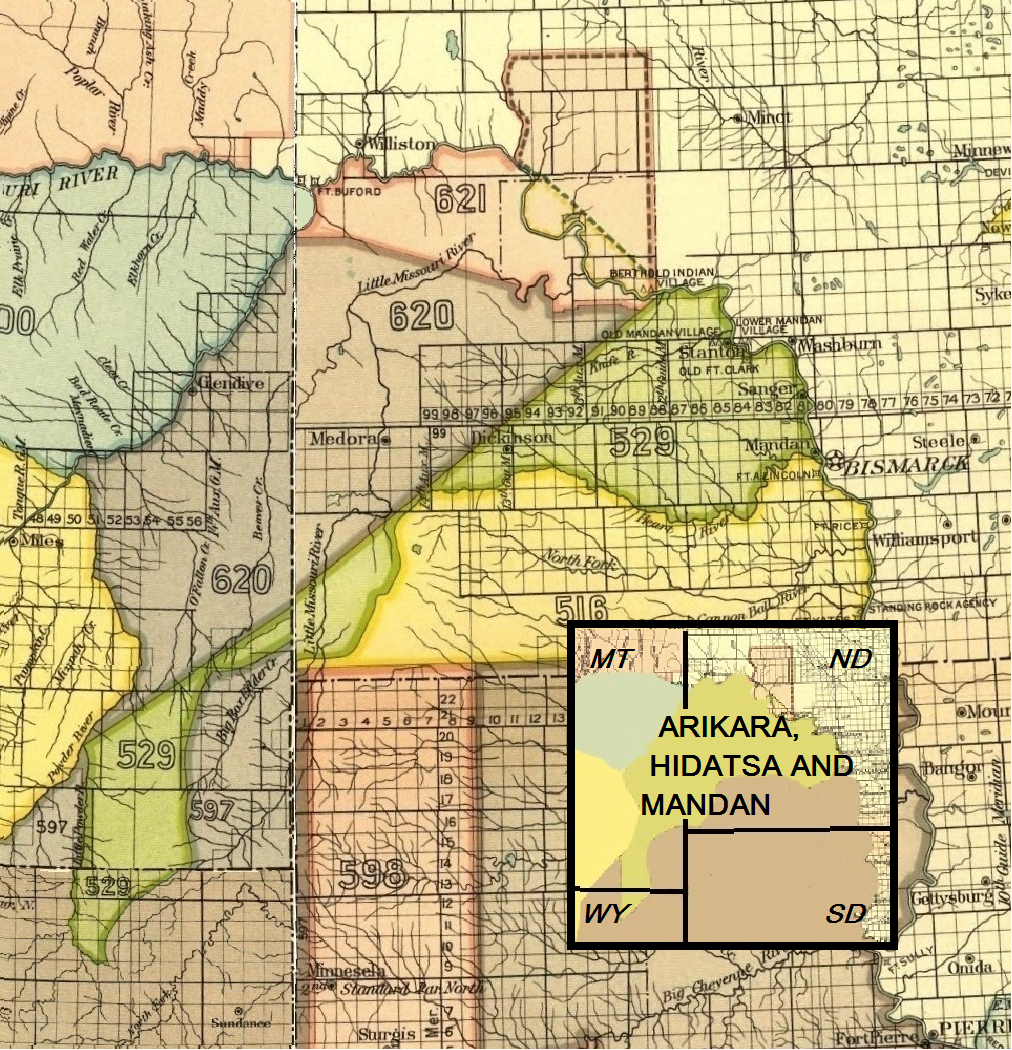
Arikara, Hidatsa and Mandan 1851 treaty territory (Area 529, 620 and 621 south of the Missouri)

A part of the Fort Berthold Indian Reservation is Indian territory of the Three Tribes recognized in the Treaty of Fort Laramie (1851).

Created in 1870 by the U.S. government, the reservation was named after Fort Berthold, a United States Army fort located on the northern bank of the Missouri River some twenty miles downstream (southeast) from the mouth of the Little Missouri River.

The green area (529) on the map turned U.S. territory on April 12, 1870, by executive order. Area 620 and the part of area 621 south of the Missouri remained in possession of the Indians. At the same time, the narrow area north of the Missouri (up to the greenish line) became territory of the Three Tribes. Thus, the United States recognized the Indians' right to the area with their only permanent homes in Like-a-Fishhook Village. By executive order, the tribes' holdings were reduced to the light pink area (621) on July 13, 1880 (although they gained some extra land straight north of the Missouri). On December 14, 1886, the tribes agreed to cede the land outside the nearly rectangular area on both sides of the Missouri indicated with black dots and strokes.

In the late nineteenth and early twentieth centuries under the Dawes Act and related laws, the US government redistributed communal holdings of tribes, assigning lots to heads of households. The government was trying to encourage the tribal members to take up subsistence farming in the European-American style. The tribe retained some communal holdings and, since its reorganization in the 1930s, has resisted distribution of individual allotments.

Modern map of the Fort Berthold Indian Reservation and nearby reservations (In red).

The creation of Garrison Dam between 1947–1953 and Lake Sakakawea as water reservoir for irrigation, for flood control, and hydroelectric power generation in 1956, flooded large areas of tribal lands that were devoted to farming and ranching, destroying much of the Three Affiliated Tribes’ economy. Creation of the lake increased the proportion of water area on the reservation. It totals 263.778 sq mi (683.182 km^{2}) or one-sixth of the reservation's surface area.

The reservation was well positioned when the application of hydraulic fracturing and directional drilling technologies caused a boom in oil production from the Bakken shale formation beginning around the year 2000.

The Four Bears Bridge, which opened in 2005 replacing the original 1955 Four Bears Bridge, provides access across Lake Sakakawea.

== Communities ==
The largest communities of the reservation are the towns of New Town and Parshall. The tribe operates 4 Bears Casino and Lodge in New Town, which was built in 1993.

Communities are:

- Four Bears Village
- Mandaree
- New Town
- Parshall
- Twin Buttes
- White Shield
- Sanish
