= Lake Sakakawea =

Artificial reservoir in North Dakota, United States

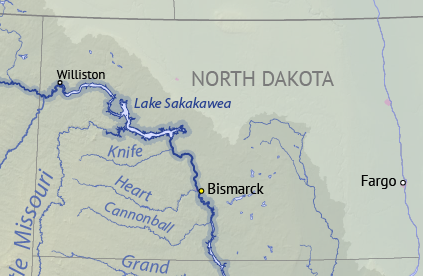
- Lake Sakakawea highlighted in light blue on Missouri River Basin map

- Location in the United States Location in North Dakota
- Location: North Dakota, United States
- Coordinates: 47.50°N 101.41°W at Garrison Dam
- Lake type: Reservoir
- Primary inflows: Missouri River, Little Missouri River, Milk River, and Yellowstone River.
- Primary outflows: Missouri River
- Catchment area: 317,400 km^{2} (122,500 sq mi)
- Max. length: 178 miles (286 km)
- Surface area: 307,000 acres (480 sq mi; 1,240 km^{2})
- Max. depth: 180 ft (55 m) at dam
- Water volume: 23,800,000 acre⋅ft (29.4 km^{3})
- Shore length^{1}: 1,320 miles (2,120 km)
- Surface elevation: 1,817 ft (554 m)
- Settlements: Williston, Pick City, Four Bears Village, and Riverdale, North Dakota
- ^{1} Shore length is not a well-defined measure.

Lake Sakakawea is a large reservoir in the north central United States, impounded in 1953 by Garrison Dam, a U.S. Army Corps of Engineers dam located in the Missouri River basin in central North Dakota. Named for the Shoshone-Hidatsa woman Sacagawea (who accompanied the Lewis and Clark Expedition), it is the largest man-made lake located entirely within North Dakota, the largest in the United States by surface area, and the third largest in the United States by volume, after Lake Mead and Lake Powell.

The lake is located about fifty miles (80 km) from the state capital of Bismarck; the distance by the Missouri River is about 75 miles (120 km). The lake's width averages between 2–3 miles (3–5 km), with a maximum of 14 miles (23 km) at Van Hook Arm. Lake Sakakawea marks the maximum southwest extent of glaciation during the ice age. The lake is located within the counties of: Dunn, McKenzie, McLean, Mercer, Mountrail, and Williams.

== History ==
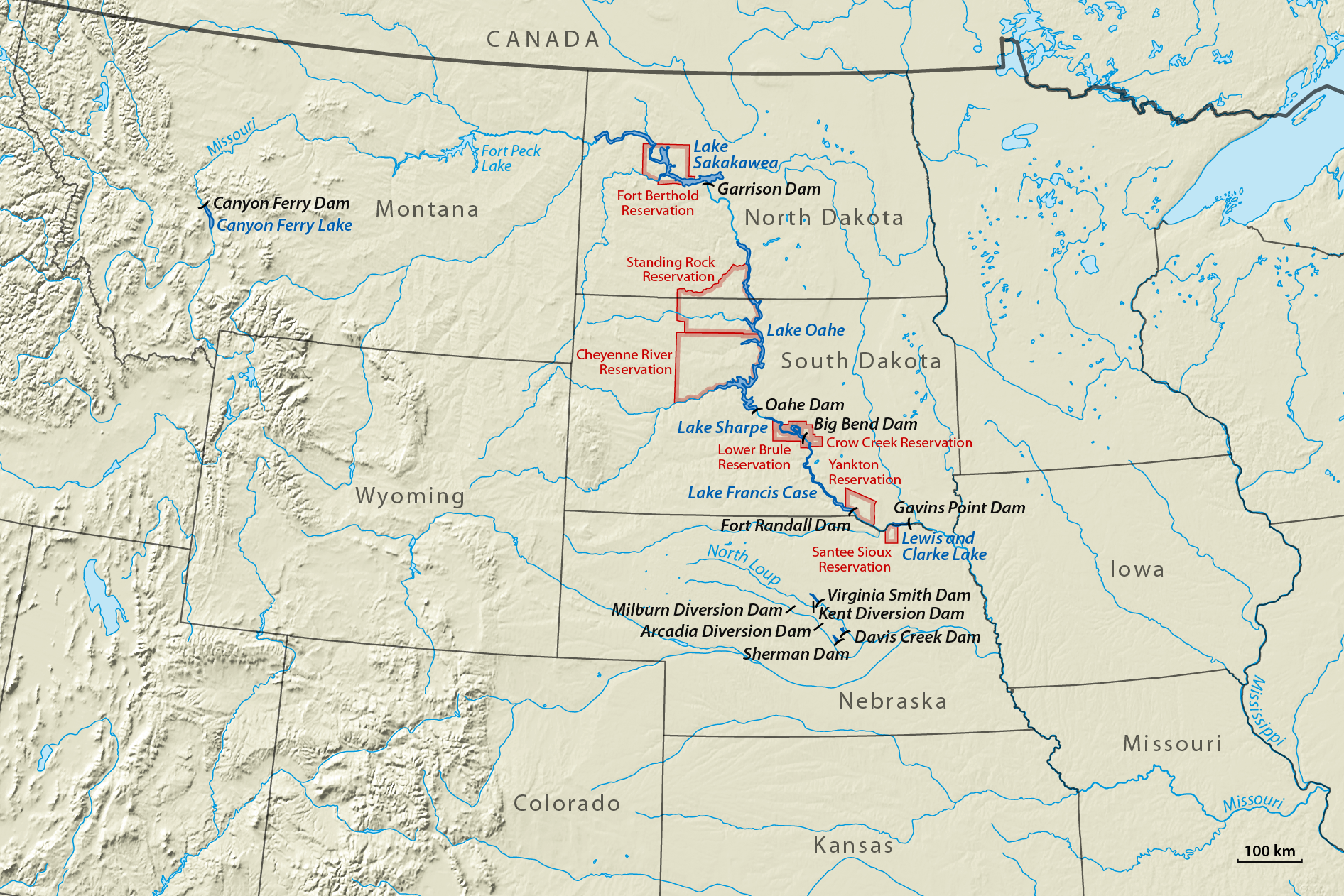
Lake Sakakawea, Garrison Dam, and other dams and reservoirs of the Pick–Sloan Project, and affected Indian reservations

The reservoir was created by construction of Garrison Dam, part of a flood control and hydroelectric power generation project named the Pick–Sloan Project along the Missouri river. Garrison dam was completed in 1956. It is the second (and largest) of six main-stem dams on the Missouri River built and managed by the U.S. Army Corps of Engineers for flood control, hydroelectric power, navigation, and irrigation.

The creation of the lake displaced members of the Fort Berthold Indian Reservation from their villages of Van Hook and (Old) Sanish, which were inundated by the creation of the lake. They relocated and founded the villages of New Town, White Shield, and Mandaree. Elbowoods was covered by the water, as was the original town site for Sanish to the northwest of New Town. But only a small portion of the Van Hook town site has ever been underwater, the area near the old railroad tracks and elevators on the very south edge of the original town. The remainder of the Van Hook town site including the original Main Street and the residential areas to the north have not been underwater. In the last two decades, Van Hook has become a thriving resort community with more residents than it ever had prior to when Lake Sakakawea filled. Yet, the US Army Corps of Engineers, as a direct consequence of poor planning, forced those living in that area of the original town site in the 1950s to evacuate. Currently, Van Hook is a lively recreational area with both year-round and summer residences.

One name that had been proposed for New Town was Vanish (a portmanteau of the two previous towns' names). Elbowoods, a third reservation town where the agency headquarters, boarding school, hospital, and jail were located, was also lost to the lake. These three towns are commemorated in the names of the three campground sections at Lake Sakakawea State Park, a state park located adjacent to Garrison Dam.

During a training flight in winter 1969, a U.S. Air Force interceptor aircraft crashed into the western portion of the lake on March 10. The F-106A Delta Dart (59-0014) was from Minot AFB, about sixty miles (100 km) north of the dam. The pilot ejected safely to land and the plane sank below the frozen lake surface. It was not located until more than 35 years later, in September 2004, after an extended search by a local surveyors' group.

== Recreation ==
The lake is a popular regional recreation destination for fishing, camping, boating, hiking, and other outdoor water-based recreation. Public recreation areas, parks, and wildlife management areas surround the lake and are managed by several agencies and organizations including the Corps of Engineers, North Dakota Department of Parks and Recreation, North Dakota Game and Fish Department, and the Fort Berthold Indian Reservation. Lake Sakakawea State Park hosts the western terminus of the North Country National Scenic Trail (NCT), a 4,800-mile hiking trail that extends to Vermont. The NCT offers a lot of hiking opportunities in the Lakes Sakakawea - Audubon area.

== See also ==
- Garrison Dam
- Missouri River
- Lake Audubon
- Pick–Sloan Plan
- U.S. Army Corps of Engineers
- Fort Berthold Indian Reservation
- North Dakota oil boom
- List of dams and reservoirs in North Dakota
