= Garrison Dam =

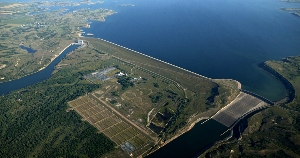
- Aerial view from the southeast, impounding Lake Sakakawea on the Missouri River

- Location in the United States Location in North Dakota
- Country: United States
- Location: McLean/Mercer counties, North Dakota
- Coordinates: 47°29′55″N 101°24′43″W
- Status: Operational
- Construction began: 1947; 79 years ago
- Opening date: 1953; 73 years ago
- Construction cost: $300 million
- Owners: U.S. Army Corps of Engineers, Omaha District

Dam and spillways
- Type of dam: Embankment, rolled earth-fill
- Impounds: Missouri River
- Height: 210 ft (64 m)
- Length: 11,300 ft (3,444 m)
- Elevation at crest: 1,854 feet (565 m) msl
- Width (crest): 60 ft (18 m)
- Width (base): 0.5 mi (0.8 km)
- Dam volume: 66,500,000 yd^{3} (50,843,000 m^{3})
- Spillway type: Service, 28 controlled-gates
- Spillway capacity: 660,000 cu ft/s (18,700 m^{3}/s)

Reservoir
- Creates: Lake Sakakawea
- Total capacity: 23,821,000 acre⋅ft (29.383 km^{3})
- Catchment area: 123,900 m^{2} (1,334,000 sq ft)
- Surface area: 382,000 acres (1,550 km^{2})
- Maximum length: 178 mi (286 km)
- Maximum water depth: 180 ft (55 m)
- Normal elevation: 1,854 ft (565 m) (max)

Power Station
- Operator: U.S. Army Corps of Engineers
- Commission date: January 1956–October 1960
- Turbines: 3 x 121.6 MW, 2 x 109.25 Francis type
- Installed capacity: 583.3 MW
- Annual generation: 2,250 GWh (1967-2009 Average)
- Website www.nwo.usace.army.mil/Missions/Dam-and-Lake-Projects/Missouri-River-Dams/Garrison/

Garrison Dam is an earth-fill embankment dam on the Missouri River in central North Dakota, U.S. Constructed by the U.S. Army Corps of Engineers from 1947 to 1953, at over two miles (3.2 km) in length, the dam is the fifth-largest earthen dam in the world. The reservoir impounded by the dam is Lake Sakakawea, which extends to Williston and the confluence with the Yellowstone River, near the Montana border. The dam and resulting reservoir inundated approximately one-sixth (16.6%) to one-fourth (25%) of Fort Berthold Indian Reservation's land, resulting in the loss of homes, farmland, and community infrastructure for the Three Affiliated Tribes.

== Location ==
Garrison Dam is located between Riverdale and Pick City, and named after the town of Garrison, directly north of the dam, across the reservoir. The dam is approximately midway between Bismarck and Minot, about 10 miles (16 km) west of U.S. Highway 83.

== History ==
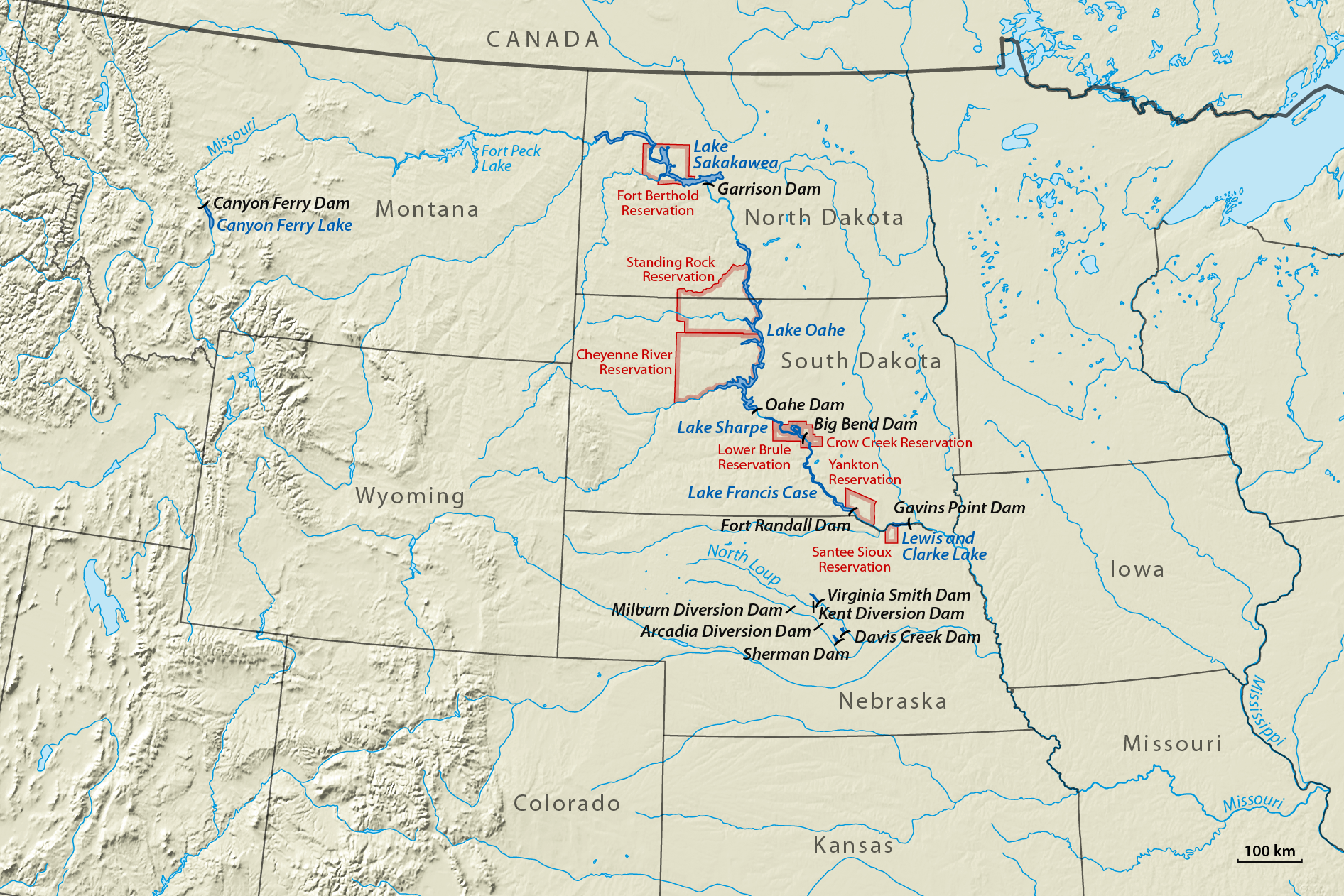
Dams and reservoirs in the Pick–Sloan Program, and affected Indian reservations.

The dam was part of a flood control and hydroelectric power generation project named the Pick-Sloan Project along the river, after the two plan developers, Col. Lewis A. Pick and William Glenn Sloan. Local communities in the area had resisted having the dam built at other locations on the river where they would be affected.

In order to construct the dam, the US government needed to purchase 152,360 acres (616.6 km^{2}) of bottomlands in the Fort Berthold Reservation that would be flooded by the creation of Lake Sakakawea. These lands were owned by the Three Affiliated Tribes, and the territory "had been their home for perhaps more than a millennium".

Threatened by confiscation under eminent domain, the tribes protested. A complete block of Garrison Dam power was denied because it would violate the 1935 Rural Electrification Act. The tribes gained remuneration, but lost 94% of their agricultural land in 1947, when they were forced to accept $5,105,625. This amount was increased to $7.5 million in 1949, but it did not fully compensate them for the loss of their important farmlands, homes, towns, and graves. They had cultivated the bottomlands and were able to be largely self-sufficient.

The final settlement legislation denied the tribes' right to use the reservoir shoreline for traditional grazing, hunting, fishing or other purposes, including irrigation development and royalty rights on all subsurface minerals within the reservoir area. About 1,700 residents were forcibly relocated, some to New Town, North Dakota at the northern end of the reservation.

Thus, construction of Garrison Dam almost totally destroyed the traditional way of life for the Three Affiliated Tribes and made them much more dependent on the federal government. In addition, the size of the lake, and the lack of bridges to cross it for decades, disrupted traditional relations among the peoples. It created new divisions among the segments on the reservation. Construction on the $300-million dam project began in 1947, and its embankment was enclosed in April 1953. The dam was dedicated by President Eisenhower two months later. The Corps of Engineers completed earthwork in the fall of 1954.

Garrison Dam is one of six Missouri River Main stem dams operated by the U.S. Army Corps of Engineers, Omaha District. The dam upstream of Garrison Dam is Fort Peck Dam (near Fort Peck, Montana). The dams downstream of Garrison Dam are: Oahe Dam (near Pierre, South Dakota), Big Bend Dam (near Fort Thompson, South Dakota), Fort Randall Dam (near Pickstown, South Dakota), and Gavins Point Dam (near Yankton, South Dakota). These six mainstem dams impound these Missouri River reservoirs with a total combined water storage capacity of approximately 73,129,000 acre⋅ft (90.203 km^{3}) and approximately 1,111,884 acres (449,963 ha) of water surface area.

In June 2011, in response to the 2011 Missouri River Floods, the dam was releasing more than 140,000 cubic feet per second (4,000 m^{3}/s), which greatly exceeded its previous record release of 65,000 cu ft/s (1,800 m^{3}/s) set in 1997. The first use of the emergency spillway due to flooding started on June 1, 2011, at 8:00am.

== Energy generation ==
Hydropower turbines at Garrison Dam have an electric power generating nameplate capacity of 583.3 MW. Average production of 257 MW serves several hundred thousand customers.

== Fishing & Recreation ==
The Garrison Dam National Fish Hatchery is the world's largest walleye and northern pike producing facility and also works to restore endangered species, such as the pallid sturgeon.

A segment of the North Country National Scenic Trail passes through the National Fish Hatchery and includes a stretch along the Missouri River shoreline where trail users are simultaneously on the Lewis & Clark National Historic Trail.

== See also ==
- Lake Sakakawea
- U.S. Army Corps of Engineers
- Riverdale, North Dakota
- Lake Audubon
- List of dams and reservoirs in North Dakota
