= New Town, North Dakota =

New Town, North Dakota niineetuhčipiriínu (Arikara)
- City
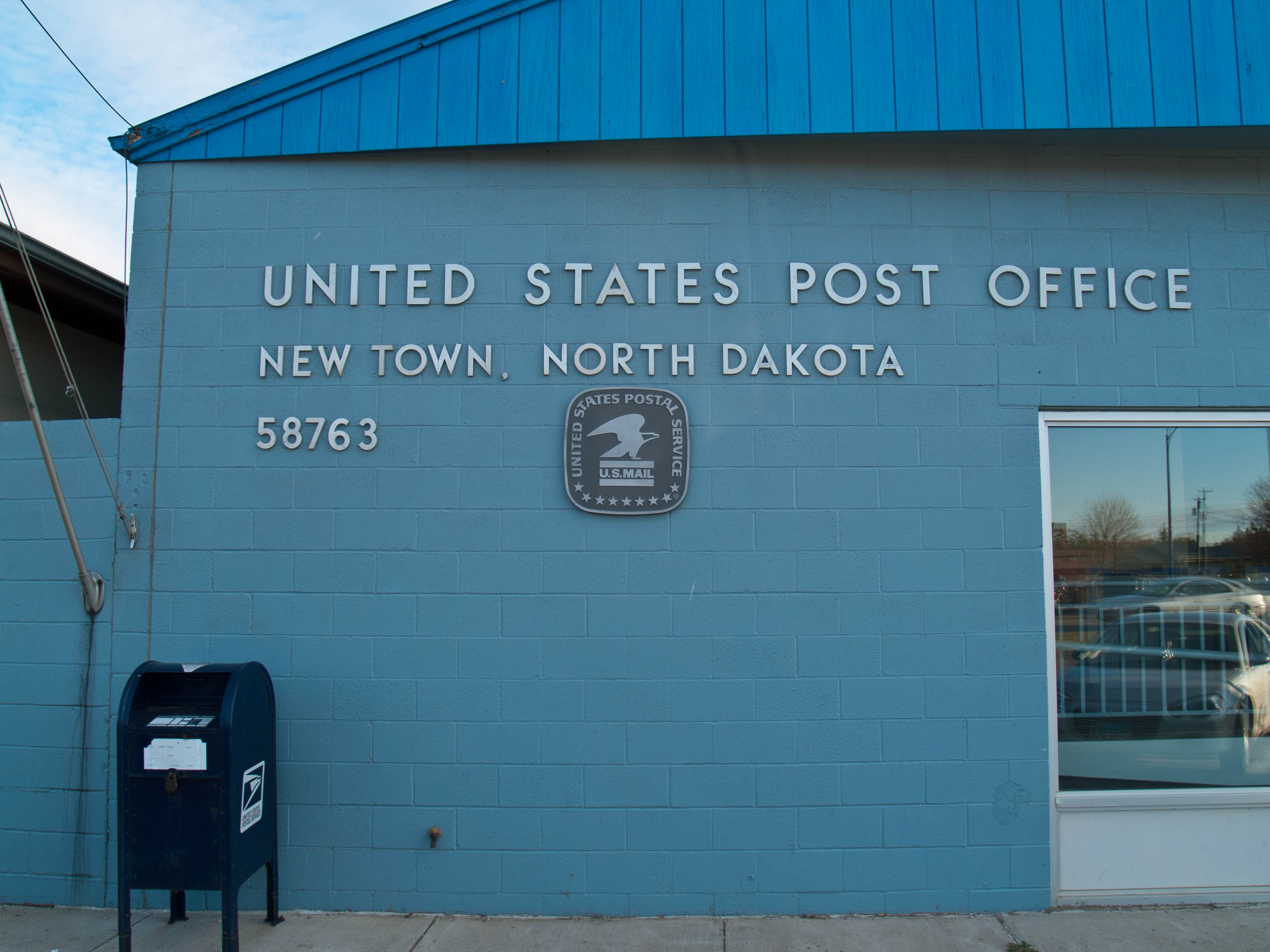
- Post office in New Town

- Location of New Town, North Dakota

- Location within the United States
- Coordinates: 47°59′23″N 102°30′18″W
- Country: United States
- State: North Dakota
- County: Mountrail
- Founded: August 1950

Government
  - Mayor: Jay Standish

Area
  - Total: 2.89 sq mi (7.48 km^{2})
  - Land: 2.89 sq mi (7.48 km^{2})
  - Water: 0 sq mi (0.00 km^{2})
- Elevation: 1,926 ft (587 m)

Population (2020)
  - Total: 2,764
  - Estimate (2024): 2,749
  - Density: 957.2/sq mi (369.58/km^{2})
- Time zone: UTC-6 (Central (CST))
  - Summer (DST): UTC-5 (CDT)
- ZIP code: 58763
- Area code: 701
- FIPS code: 38-56740
- GNIS feature ID: 1036184
- Highways: ND 23, ND 1804
- Website: citynewtownnd.com

New Town (Arikara: niineetuhčipiriínu) is a city in Mountrail County, North Dakota. The population was 2,764 at the time of the 2020 census, making it the 18th largest city in North Dakota. New Town was platted in 1950 as a replacement site for the residents of Sanish and Van Hook, as these towns were scheduled to be flooded by the creation of Lake Sakakawea, a reservoir to provide water for irrigation.

It is the largest city and the administrative center of the Fort Berthold Reservation. New Town is home to Nueta Hidatsa Sahnish College. New Town is located on State Highway 23 at the crossing of Lake Sakakawea by the Four Bears Bridge.

== History ==
In 1944, the United States Congress passed the Flood Control Act of 1944, which authorized the construction of the Garrison Dam. The dam was planned to be the world's largest rolled-earth filled dam and would create the second-largest reservoir in the world to collect water for irrigation and regional water needs. It would form a lake 200 miles long, 14 miles wide in some places and have roughly 1,500 miles of shoreline. In order to make this dam and reservoir, the towns of Sanish, Elbowoods, Lucky Mound, Shell Creek, Nishu, Charging Eagle, Beaver Creek, Red Butte, Independence, and Van Hook had to be dissolved and the residents relocated before the area was flooded. A total of seven possible sites were inspected before the present site was chosen.

After the site was purchased, plans were quickly developed for the proposed town. With the help of Army engineers, by August 1950, the combined town site was platted. On September 10, 1950, a ground-breaking ceremony and celebration was held at the proposed town site. The official ground-breaking was a furrow cut by a county road grader in what was to become Main Street. The first building set up was for the relocation company. They held an auction to sell off lots in what was called New Town.

Two days later more than sixty percent of the lots had sold. The school was gifted to the town, as were lots for the relocating churches. In November 1952, seventy-four voters went to the polls to elect the first city officials of New Town. On January 1, 1953, the post office was established in the former office of the Relocation Company. Businesses were moved from the surrounding villages, and soon people had to go to New Town for groceries and supplies. The towns were officially dissolved as of April 30, 1953. July 1, 1953 was the deadline given to the residents to be moved out of their respective towns.

In the fall of 1953, school opened for New Town students. The New School was ready in September 1954 and dedicated April 15, 1955. The first scheduled train arrived at New Town on September 22, 1953. By 1955, the town had grown to about 1,400 residents.

The discovery of oil in this part of North Dakota led to the development of oil fields in the vicinity. Many new workers were attracted to the community and, with work on the new bridge, roads, and construction in the town, jobs were plentiful. The bridge across the reservoir was completed in October 1955. It was named Four Bears after two great Indian chiefs, a Mandan and a Hidatsa, who bore the same name.

New Town is home to a statue of cowboy Earl Bunyan, "brother" of fictional lumberjack Paul Bunyan, built in 1953 by New Town resident cowboy Fred LaRocque.

== Demographics ==
Historical population
Census	Pop.	Note	%±
1960	1,586		—
1970	1,428		−10.0%
1980	1,335		−6.5%
1990	1,388		4.0%
2000	1,367		−1.5%
2010	1,925		40.8%
2020	2,764		43.6%
2022 (est.)	2,645		−4.3%
U.S. Decennial Census; 2020 Census

=== 2020 census ===
As of the 2020 census, New Town had a population of 2,764. The median age was 30.2 years. 31.4% of residents were under the age of 18 and 7.5% of residents were 65 years of age or older. For every 100 females there were 100.6 males, and for every 100 females age 18 and over there were 100.7 males age 18 and over.

0.0% of residents lived in urban areas, while 100.0% lived in rural areas.

There were 956 households in New Town, of which 41.3% had children under the age of 18 living in them. Of all households, 31.0% were married-couple households, 26.4% were households with a male householder and no spouse or partner present, and 32.1% were households with a female householder and no spouse or partner present. About 29.2% of all households were made up of individuals and 7.3% had someone living alone who was 65 years of age or older.

There were 1,197 housing units, of which 20.1% were vacant. The homeowner vacancy rate was 3.2% and the rental vacancy rate was 17.1%.

Racial composition as of the 2020 census
Race	Number	Percent
White	464	16.8%
Black or African American	67	2.4%
American Indian and Alaska Native	1,849	66.9%
Asian	55	2.0%
Native Hawaiian and Other Pacific Islander	0	0.0%
Some other race	84	3.0%
Two or more races	245	8.9%
Hispanic or Latino (of any race)	240	8.7%

=== 2010 census ===
As of the census of 2010, there were 1,925 people, 647 households, and 437 families living in the city. The population density was 1,503.9 inhabitants per square mile (580.7/km^{2}). There were 701 housing units at an average density of 547.7 per square mile (211.5/km^{2}). The racial makeup of the city was 17.8% White, 0.2% African American, 76.4% Native American, 0.1% Asian, 0.1% Pacific Islander, 1.2% from other races, and 4.3% from two or more races. Hispanic or Latino of any race were 4.3% of the population.

There were 647 households, of which 43.1% had children under the age of 18 living with them, 34.3% were married couples living together, 23.8% had a female householder with no husband present, 9.4% had a male householder with no wife present, and 32.5% were non-families. 27.8% of all households were made up of individuals, and 9.8% had someone living alone who was 65 years of age or older. The average household size was 2.96 and the average family size was 3.58.

The median age in the city was 30.2 years. 30.8% of residents were under the age of 18; 12.6% were between the ages of 18 and 24; 24.6% were from 25 to 44; 23.1% were from 45 to 64; and 8.9% were 65 years of age or older. The gender makeup of the city was 48.5% male and 51.5% female.

=== 2000 census ===
As of the census of 2000, there were 1,367 people, 488 households, and 318 families living in the city. The population density was 2,031.6 inhabitants per square mile (784.4/km^{2}). There were 512 housing units at an average density of 760.9 per square mile (293.8/km^{2}). The racial makeup of the city was 29.63% White, 0.15% African American, 66.86% Native American, 0.29% Asian, 0.15% Pacific Islander, 0.07% from other races, and 2.85% from two or more races. Hispanic or Latino of any race were 1.46% of the population.

There were 488 households, out of which 34.2% had children under the age of 18 living with them, 36.1% were married couples living together, 22.3% had a female householder with no husband present, and 34.8% were non-families. 29.5% of all households were made up of individuals, and 12.7% had someone living alone who was 65 years of age or older. The average household size was 2.69 and the average family size was 3.34.

In the city, the population was spread out, with 30.7% under the age of 18, 9.9% from 18 to 24, 26.3% from 25 to 44, 20.4% from 45 to 64, and 12.7% who were 65 years of age or older. The median age was 33 years. For every 100 females, there were 88.8 males. For every 100 females age 18 and over, there were 86.4 males.

The median income for a household in the city was $29,524, and the median income for a family was $35,500. Males had a median income of $26,944 versus $21,630 for females. The per capita income for the city was $12,490. About 17.2% of families and 23.3% of the population were below the poverty line, including 25.2% of those under age 18 and 30.0% of those age 65 or over.

== Education ==
New Town students attend New Town Public Schools.

== Climate ==
This climatic region is typified by large seasonal temperature differences, with warm to hot (and often humid) summers and cold (sometimes severely cold) winters. According to the Köppen Climate Classification system, New Town has a humid continental climate, abbreviated "Dfb" on climate maps.
