= Knife River, Montana =

- Former CDP
- Location of Knife River, Montana
- Coordinates: 47°27′13″N 104°20′42″W
- Country: United States
- State: Montana
- County: Richland

Area
  - Total: 3.4 sq mi (8.9 km^{2})
  - Land: 3.4 sq mi (8.9 km^{2})
  - Water: 0 sq mi (0.0 km^{2})
- Elevation: 1,991 ft (607 m)

Population (2010)
  - Total: 320
  - Density: 86/sq mi (33.3/km^{2})
- Time zone: UTC-7 (Mountain (MST))
  - Summer (DST): UTC-6 (MDT)
- Area code: 406
- FIPS code: 30-41087
- GNIS feature ID: 1853183

Knife River was a census-designated place (CDP) in Richland County, Montana, United States. The population was 320 at the 2010 census. The CDP primarily consisted of the unincorporated community of Savage. The Knife River CDP was not recorded at the 2020 census; instead, a smaller CDP named "Savage", comprising only the built-up portion of the town, was listed.

== Geography ==
The Knife River CDP was located at 47°27′13″N 104°20′42″W (47.453610, -104.344938), comprising the community of Savage and agricultural areas to the east and west. The CDP was on the west side of the Yellowstone River.

According to the United States Census Bureau, the CDP has a total area of 3.5 square miles (9.1 km^{2}), all land.

== Demographics ==
Historical population
Census	Pop.	Note	%±
2000	297		—
2010	320		7.7%
U.S. Decennial Census

As of the census of 2000, there were 297 people, 125 households, and 79 families residing in the CDP. The population density was 86.2 inhabitants per square mile (33.3/km^{2}). There were 145 housing units at an average density of 42.1 per square mile (16.3/km^{2}). The racial makeup of the CDP was 96.97% White, 1.35% Native American, 0.67% from other races, and 1.01% from two or more races. Hispanic or Latino of any race were 4.04% of the population.

There were 125 households, out of which 31.2% had children under the age of 18 living with them, 52.0% were married couples living together, 7.2% had a female householder with no husband present, and 36.8% were non-families. 36.0% of all households were made up of individuals, and 19.2% had someone living alone who was 65 years of age or older. The average household size was 2.38 and the average family size was 3.09.

In the CDP, the population was spread out, with 26.9% under the age of 18, 6.4% from 18 to 24, 24.2% from 25 to 44, 25.6% from 45 to 64, and 16.8% who were 65 years of age or older. The median age was 40 years. For every 100 females, there were 104.8 males. For every 100 females age 18 and over, there were 102.8 males.

The median income for a household in the CDP was $29,792, and the median income for a family was $32,750. Males had a median income of $27,083 versus $19,375 for females. The per capita income for the CDP was $11,865. About 10.1% of families and 15.8% of the population were below the poverty line, including 16.5% of those under the age of eighteen and 24.4% of those 65 or over.
