= Parshall Oil Field =

Oil field in North Dakota, United States

Coordinates: 48°1′25″N 102°8′20″W

The Parshall Oil Field is an oil field producing from the Bakken Formation and Three Forks Formation near the town of Parshall, in Mountrail County, North Dakota. The field is in the Williston Basin. The field was discovered in 2006 by Michael Johnson and sold the play to EOG Resources, which drilled, and now operates, most of the wells. It was the discovery of the Parshall Field that was largely responsible for the North Dakota oil boom. Parshall's break-even price is at US$38/barrel, which is the lowest on the Bakken Formation; overall, Bakken's break-even point is of US$62/barrel.

== Discovery ==
Mike Johnson, a petroleum geologist in Denver, Colorado, is recognized as responsible for the discovery. Johnson has been recognized for this achievement by the American Association of Petroleum Geologists (AAPG) and the Rocky Mountain Association of Geologists (RMAG). Over the years, oil companies had drilled a number of dry holes through the oil-bearing Bakken shale at Parshall. Johnson had examined the well log of a decades-old dry hole drilled near the town of Parshall, and noticed that the Bakken interval looked similar to Bakken pay in the Elm Coulee Oil Field, a Bakken oil field on the southwest margin of the Williston Basin, in Montana. Believing that he might have another Elm Coulee on the east side of the basin, except with a different trapping mechanism, he and a partner leased a large land position, and made a deal for EOG to drill it.

EOG drilled the discovery well, the horizontal Parshall #1-36H, in 2006, located next to a dry hole drilled in 1981. Like wells in Elm Coulee, the Parshall well was drilled horizontally in the middle member of the Bakken. Oil flowed to the surface during drilling, even before hydraulic fracturing. EOG quickly expanded the field by drilling development wells. Drilling soon defined the eastern edge of the field, a trap formed by eastern edge of the oil maturity window. Oil well drilling spread north, south, and west over a wide area, and soon extended Bakken oil production well beyond the boundaries of Parshall Field as defined by the North Dakota Industrial Commission. Bakken and Three Forks oil production have since been shown to form a very large laterally continuous oil reservoir, extending from Parshall on the east, west to past the Montana state line; however, the continuous Bakken/Three Forks productive area is split up administratively into many different oil fields.

== Production ==
The field was developed by horizontal wells and massive hydraulic fracturing. Through March 2013, the field has produced 65 million barrels of oil and 30 billion cubic feet of natural gas, from more than 200 wells.
