= Bakken formation =

Geological formation in North America

Bakken Formation
- Stratigraphic range: Late Devonian-Early Mississippian; ~380–340 Ma
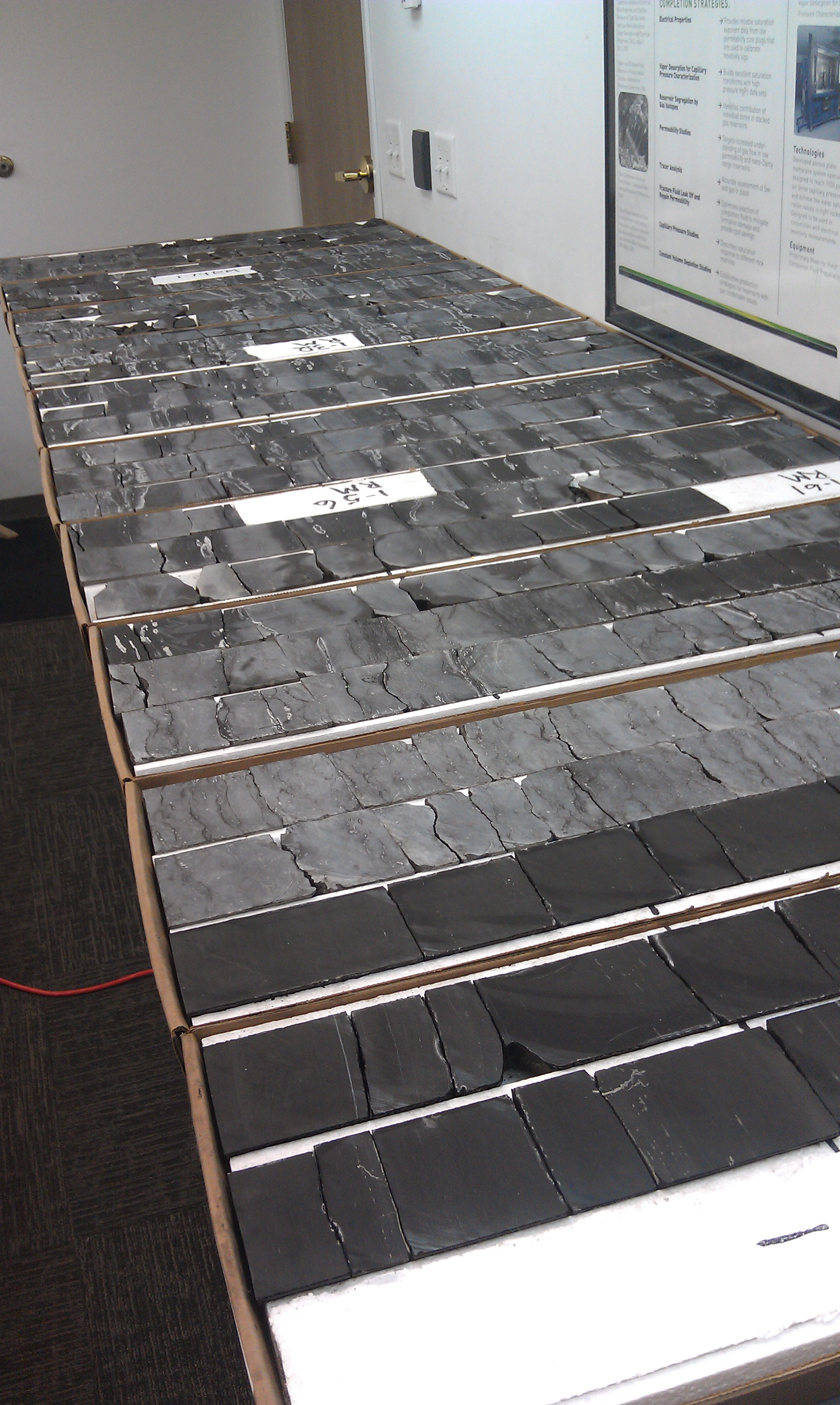
- Cut Bakken core samples
- Type: Geological formation
- Unit of: Three Forks Group
- Underlies: Madison Limestone
- Overlies: Wabamun, Big Valley & Torquay Formations
- Area: 200,000 square miles (520,000 km^{2})
- Thickness: up to 40 metres (130 ft)

Lithology
- Primary: Shale, dolomite
- Other: Sandstone, siltstone

Location
- Coordinates: 48.3929°N 102.9399°W
- Region: Central North America
- Country: Canada; United States
- Extent: Williston Basin

Type section
- Named for: Henry O. Bakken (1901-1982)
- Named by: J.W. Nordquist
- Year defined: 1953
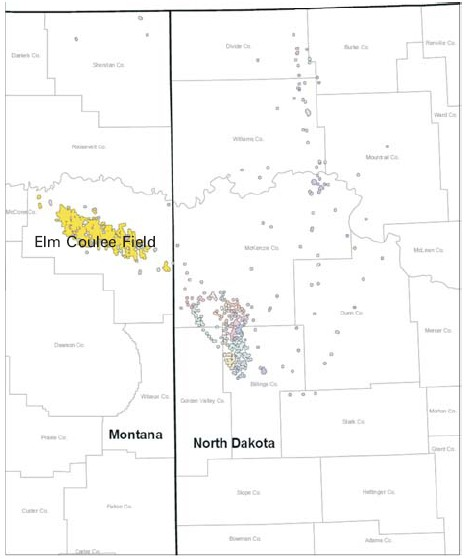
- Map of the Bakken Formation reservoirs in the US portion of the Williston Basin (Saskatchewan is north border). Prior to 2007, most oil came from the Elm Coulee Oil Field.

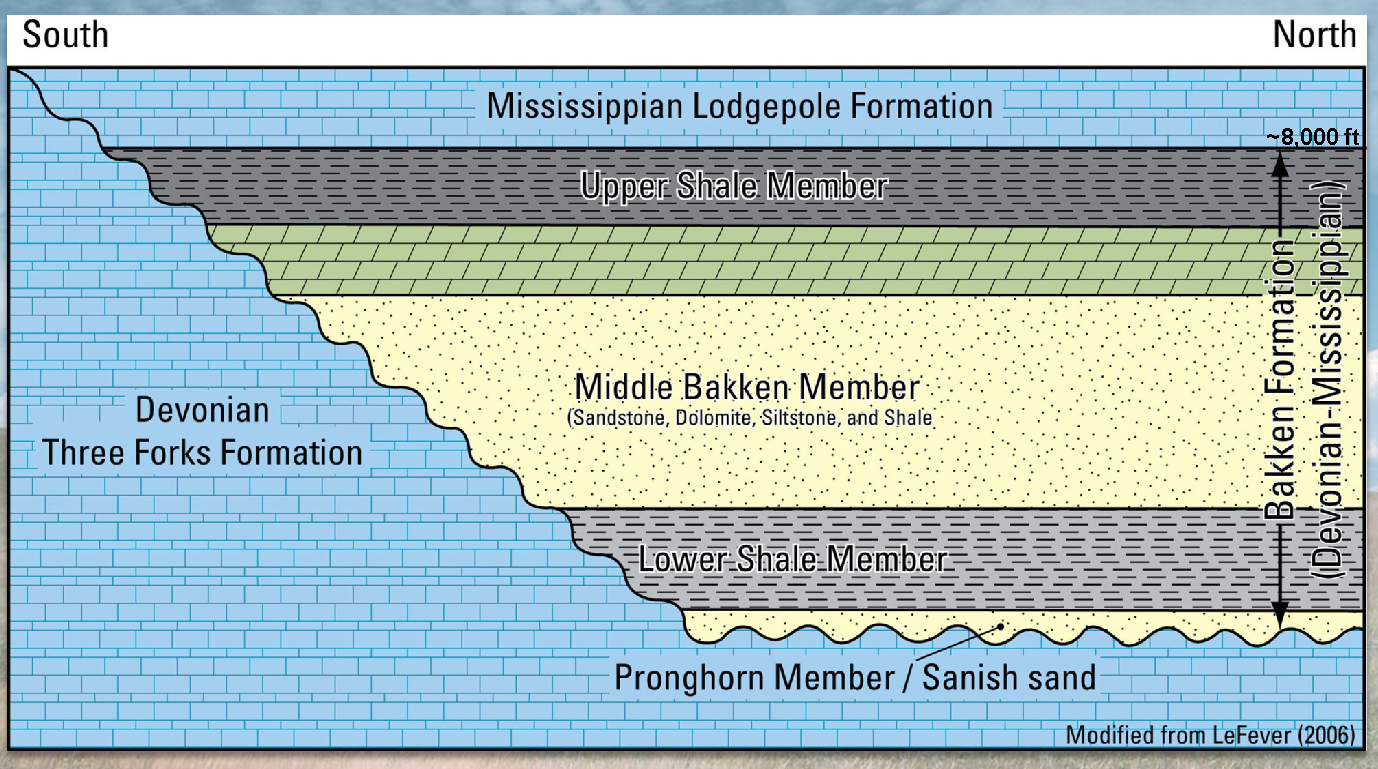
Schematic north-south cross section showing the Bakken and adjacent formations (USGS, 2013)

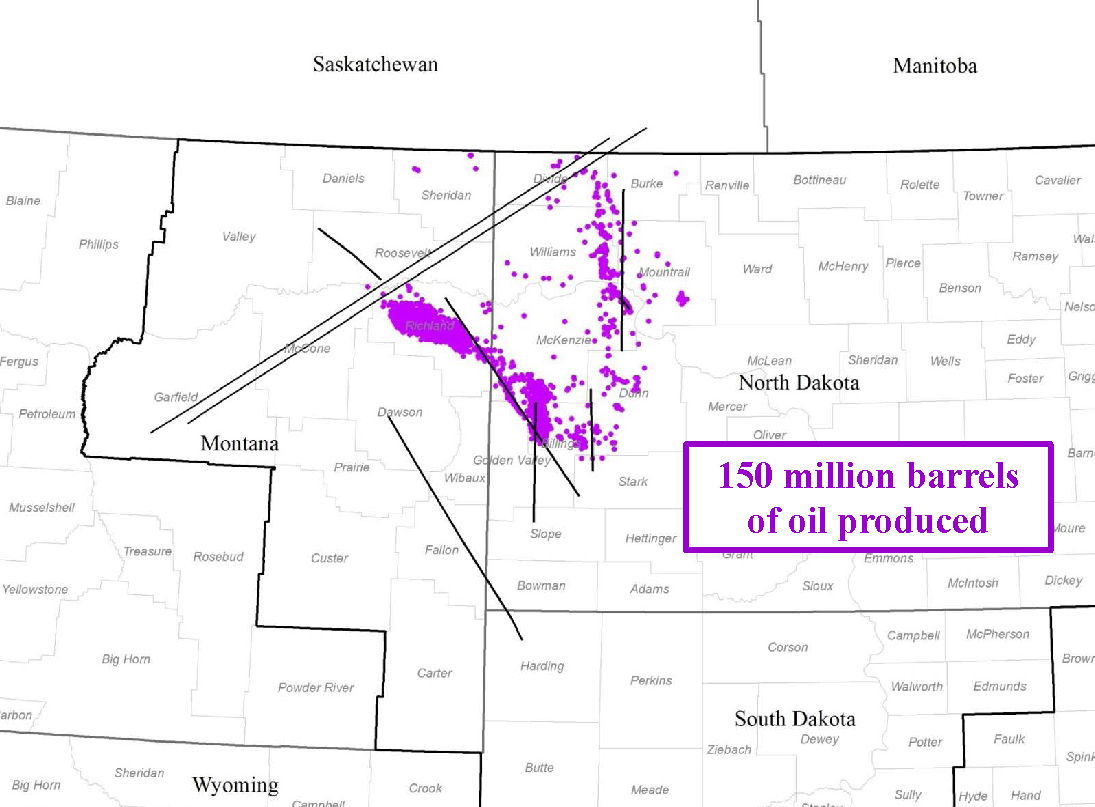
Map of Bakken wells in the US as of 2008, largely restricted to the southwest pinchout and the Nesson Anticline (USGS, 2013)

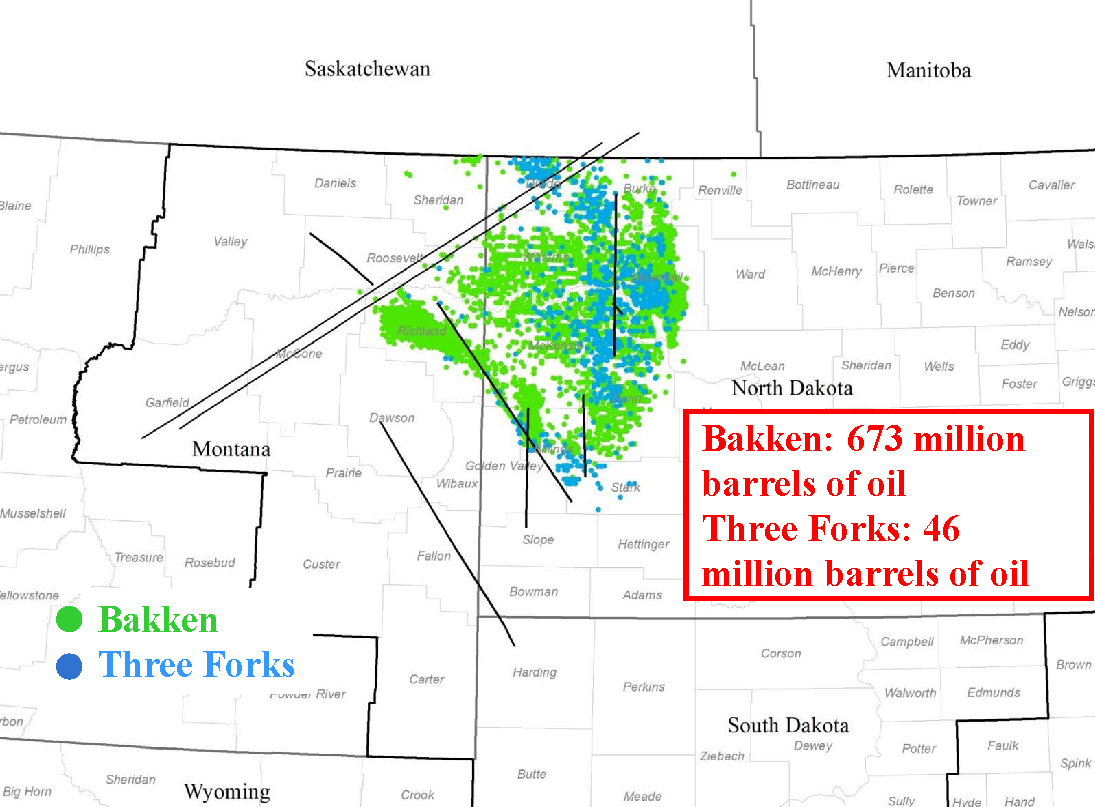
US Bakken and Three Forks wells as of 2013

The Bakken Formation (/ˈbɑːkən/ BAH-kən) is a rock unit from the Late Devonian to Early Mississippian age occupying about 200,000 square miles (520,000 km^{2}) of the subsurface of the Williston Basin, underlying parts of Montana, North Dakota, Saskatchewan and Manitoba. The formation was initially described by geologist J. W. Nordquist in 1953. The formation is entirely in the subsurface, and has no surface outcrop. It is named after Henry O. Bakken (1901–1982), a farmer in Tioga, North Dakota, who owned the land where the formation was initially discovered during oil drilling.

Besides the Bakken Formation being a widespread prolific source rock for oil when thermally mature, significant producible oil reserves exist within the rock unit itself. Oil was first discovered within the Bakken in 1951, but previous efforts to produce it faced technical difficulties that were cost prohibitive when cheaper energy sources were available elsewhere.

In April 2008, a USGS report estimated the amount of recoverable oil using technology readily available at the end of 2007 within the Bakken Formation at 3.0 to 4.3 billion barrels (680,000,000 m^{3}), with a mean of 3.65 billion. Simultaneously the state of North Dakota released a report with a lower estimate of 2.1 billion barrels (330,000,000 m^{3}) of technically recoverable oil in the Bakken. Various other estimates place the total reserves, recoverable and non-recoverable with today's technology, at up to 24 billion barrels. A recent estimate places the figure at 18 billion barrels. In April 2013, the U.S. Geological Survey released a new figure for expected ultimate recovery of 7.4 billion barrels of oil.

The application of hydraulic fracturing and directional drilling technologies has caused a boom in Bakken oil production since 2000. By the end of 2010, oil production rates had reached 458,000 barrels (72,800 m^{3}) per day, thereby outstripping the pipeline capacity to ship oil out of the Bakken. There is some controversy over the safety of shipping this crude oil by rail due to its volatility.

This was illustrated by the 2013 Lac-Mégantic rail disaster, in which a unit train carrying 77 tank cars full of highly volatile Bakken oil through Quebec from North Dakota to the Irving Oil Refinery in New Brunswick derailed and exploded in the town centre of Lac-Mégantic. It destroyed 30 buildings (half the downtown core) and killed 47 people. The explosion was estimated to have a one-kilometre (0.62 mi) blast radius.

As of January 2015, estimates varied on the break-even oil price for drilling Bakken wells. The North Dakota Department of Natural Resources estimated overall break-even to be just below US$40 per barrel. An analyst for Wood Mackenzie said that the overall break-even price was US$62/barrel, but in high-productivity areas such as the Sanish Field and the Parshall Oil Field, the break-even price was US$38–US$40 per barrel.

== Geology ==
The rock formation consists of three members: lower shale, middle dolomite, and upper shale. The shales were deposited in relatively deep anoxic marine conditions, and the dolomite was deposited as a coastal carbonate bank during a time of shallower, well-oxygenated water. The middle dolomite member is the principal oil reservoir, roughly two miles (3 km) below the surface. Both the upper and lower shale members are organic-rich marine shale.

== Oil and gas ==
The Bakken Formation has emerged in recent years as one of the most important sources of new oil production in the United States. Most Bakken drilling and production has been in North Dakota, although the formation also extends into Montana and the Canadian provinces of Saskatchewan and Manitoba. As of 2013, the Bakken was the source of more than ten percent of all US oil production. By April 2014, Bakken production in North Dakota and Montana exceeded 1 million barrels per day (160,000 m^{3}/d). As a result of increased production from the Bakken, and long-term production declines in Alaska and California, during every month from April 2012 through February 2021 (except June 2020), North Dakota was the second-most oil-producing state in the US, behind only Texas (and usually also offshore production in the Gulf of Mexico) in volume of oil produced per day, until New Mexico surpassed it in March 2021; as of June 2025, it is the third-most oil-producing state.

Bakken production has also increased in Canada, although to a lesser degree than in the US, since the 2004 discovery of the Viewfield Oil Field in Saskatchewan. The same techniques of horizontal drilling and multi-stage massive hydraulic fracturing are used. In December 2012, 2,357 Bakken wells in Saskatchewan produced a record high of 71,000 barrels per day (11,000 m^{3}/d). The Bakken Formation also produces in Manitoba, yielding 42.1 thousand barrels per day of crude oil in 2020 and 38.5 in 2023.

=== Drilling and completion ===
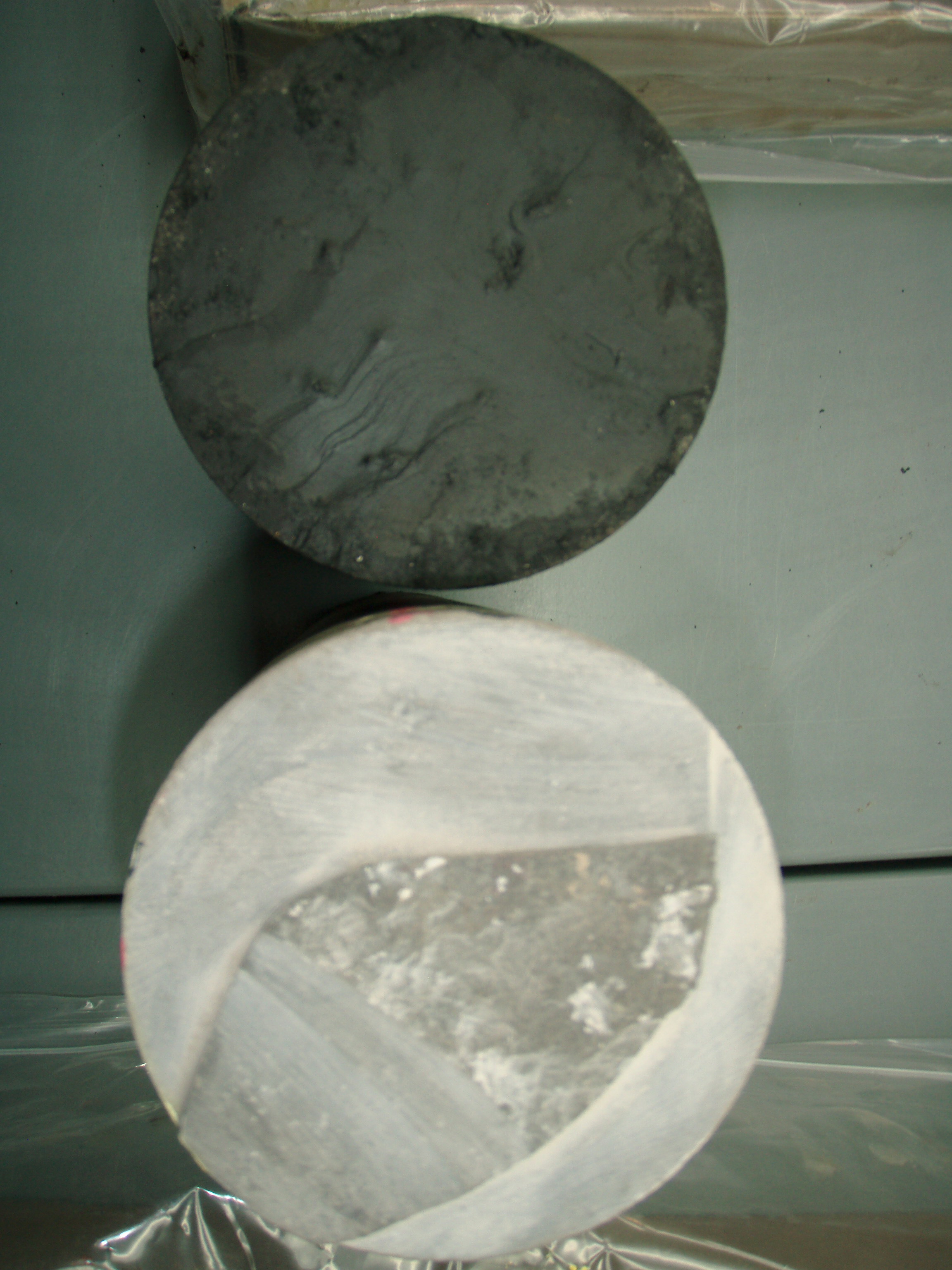
Lower Bakken-3 Forks Transition

Most Bakken wells are drilled and completed in the middle member. Many wells are now being drilled and completed in the basal Sanish/Pronghorn member and in the underlying Three Forks Formation, which the North Dakota Department of Mineral Resources treats as part of the Bakken for oil production statistical purposes.

Porosities in the Bakken averages about 5%, and permeabilities are very low, averaging 0.04 millidarcys—much lower than typical oil reservoirs, in today's terms an unconventional light tight oil play. However, the presence of vertical to sub-vertical natural fractures makes the Bakken an excellent candidate for horizontal drilling techniques in which a well is drilled horizontally along bedding planes, rather than vertically through them. In this way, a borehole can contact many thousands of feet of oil reservoir rock in a unit with a maximum thickness of only about 140 feet (40 m).

Production is also enhanced by artificially fracturing the rock, to allow oil to seep to the oil well.

Hydrogen sulfide (H_{2}S, also known as sour gas) is found to varying degrees in crude petroleum. The gas is flammable, corrosive, poisonous, and explosive; thus, oil with higher levels of H_{2}S presents challenges such as "health and environmental risks, corrosion of wellbore, added expense with regard to materials handling and pipeline equipment, and additional refinement requirements." Bakken oil has historically been characterized as "sweet", meaning that it has little or no H_{2}S. However, increased concentration of H_{2}S over time has been observed in some Bakken wells, believed to be due to certain completion practices, such as hydraulic fracturing into neighboring formations, that may contain high levels of H_{2}S. Some other formations in the Williston Basin have always produced "sour" (high H_{2}S) crude oil, and because sweet oil brings a higher price, oil transporters suspect that some sour oil is being blended into sweet Bakken crude. H_{2}S in crude oil is being investigated as a possible cause of the explosive nature of the Lac-Mégantic rail disaster. Pipeline transport operator Enbridge no longer accepts crude with more than five parts per million H_{2}S, citing safety concerns.

Increased US oil production from hydraulically fractured tight oil wells in formations such as the Bakken was mostly responsible for the decrease in US oil imports since 2005. The US imported 52% of its oil in 2011, down from 65% in 2005. Hydraulically fractured wells in the Bakken, Eagle Ford, and other tight oil targets enabled US crude oil production to rise in September 2013 to the highest output since 1989.

=== History of Bakken oil resource estimates ===
==== Oil in place ====
A research paper by USGS geochemist Leigh Price in 1999 estimated the total amount of oil contained in the Bakken shale ranged from 271 to 503 billion barrels (43.1 to 80.0 billion cubic metres), with a mean of 413 billion barrels (65.7 billion cubic metres). While others before him had begun to realize that the oil generated by the Bakken shales had remained within the Bakken, it was Price, who had spent much of his career studying the Bakken, who particularly stressed this point. If he was right, the large amounts of oil remaining in this formation would make it a prime oil exploration target. Price died in 2000 before his research could be peer-reviewed and published. The drilling and production successes in much of the Bakken beginning with the Elm Coulee Oil Field discovery in 2000 have proven correct his claim that the oil generated by the Bakken shale was there. In April 2008, a report issued by the state of North Dakota Department of Mineral Resources estimated that the North Dakota portion of the Bakken contained 167 billion barrels (26.6 billion cubic metres) of oil in place.

==== Recoverable oil ====
Although the amount of oil in place is a very large oil resource, the percentage that can be extracted with current technology is another matter. Estimates of the Bakken's recovery factor have ranged from as low as 1%—because the Bakken shale has generally low porosity and low permeability, making the oil difficult to extract—to Leigh Price's estimate of 50% recoverable. Reports issued by both the USGS and the state of North Dakota in April 2013 estimated up to 7.4 billion barrels of oil can be recovered from the Bakken and Three Forks formations in the Dakotas and Montana, using current technology. The flurry of drilling activity in the Bakken, coupled with the wide range of estimates of in-place and recoverable oil, led North Dakota senator Byron Dorgan to ask the USGS to conduct a study of the Bakken's potentially recoverable oil. In April 2008 the USGS released this report, which estimated the amount of technically recoverable, undiscovered oil in the Bakken formation at 3.0 to 4.3 billion barrels (480 to 680 million cubic metres), with a mean of 3.65 billion. Later that month, the state of North Dakota's report estimated that of the 167 billion barrels (26.6 billion cubic metres) of oil in place in the North Dakota portion of the Bakken, 2.1 billion barrels (330 million cubic metres) were technically recoverable with current technology.

In 2011, a senior manager at Continental Resources Inc. (CLR) declared that the "Bakken play in the Williston basin could become the world's largest discovery in the last 30–40 years," as ultimate recovery from the overall play is now estimated at 24 billion barrels (3.8 billion cubic metres). (Note: the recent discoveries off the coast of Brazil should be greater, with proven reserves of 30 billion, and a potential for 50 to 80.) This considerable increase has been made possible by the combined use of horizontal drilling, hydraulic fracturing, and a large number of wells drilled. While these technologies have been consistently in use since the 1980s, the Bakken trend is the place where they are being most heavily used: 150 active rigs in the play and a rate of 1,800 added wells per year.

An April 2013 estimate by the USGS projects that 7.4 billion barrels (1.18 billion cubic metres) of undiscovered oil can be recovered from the Bakken and Three Forks formations and 6.7 trillion cubic feet of natural gas and 530 million barrels of natural gas liquids using current technology.

The Energy Information Administration (EIA), the statistics service of the Department of Energy, estimated in 2013 that there were 1.6 billion barrels and 2.2 trillion cubic feet (tcf) of technically recoverable oil and natural gas in the Canadian portion of the Bakken formation. Crescent Point Energy and other operators are implementing waterfloods in the Bakken Formation of the Viewfield Oil Field in Saskatchewan. Some believe that waterflooding can raise the recovery factor at Viewfield from 19 percent to more than 30 percent, adding 1.5 to two billion barrels of additional oil.

==== Proved reserves ====
The US EIA reported that proved reserves in the Bakken/Three Forks were 2.00 billion barrels of oil as of 2011.

== History of Bakken oil ==
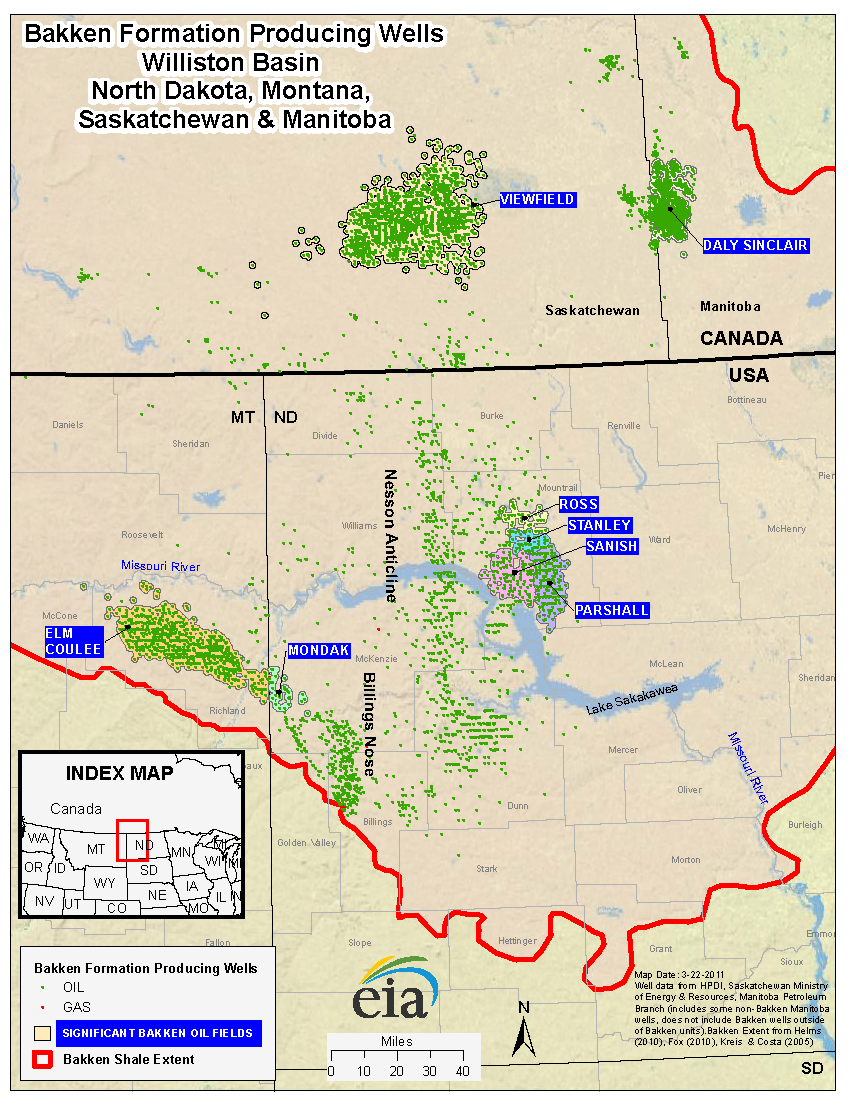
Oil wells producing from the Bakken Formation, US and Canada in 2011

The Bakken formation has produced oil since 1953, when the #1 Woodrow Starr was completed in North Dakota by Stanolind Oil and Gas.

=== Land History ===
A portion of the Bakken oil region sits on the Fort Berthold Reservation, created in 1870. Fort Berthold is home to the Mandan, Hidatsa, and Arikara Nation- also known as MHA Nation or the Three Affiliated Tribes. Fort Berthold was once home primarily to farmers and traders until the construction of the Garrison Dam in 1947 wiped out much of the farmland and forced a majority of the Three Affiliated Tribes to relocate to higher ground on the prairie. According to Lower Brule Sioux historian Nick Estes, the dam inundated the Fort Berthold Reservation and took 152,360 acres of their land, a loss of a quarter of the reservation's entire land base. The oil boom holds the potential to generate hundreds of million dollars for the tribes, offering the change to construct new roads, schools, and essential housing and healthcare facilities, but it also comes with a steep social cost with an increase in violence against Native populations.

=== Southwest pinch-out ===
A major advance in extracting oil from the Bakken came in 1995, when geologist Dick Findley realized that the dolomitic Middle member of the Bakken Formation was a better exploration target than the upper or lower members. Although the middle member held less oil in place than the organic shales both above and below, it was able to maintain open fractures more than the shales. Horizontal wells in the middle Bakken were used successfully to develop the Elm Coulee Field in Montana.

The 2000 discovery of the Elm Coulee Oil Field, Richland County, Montana, where production is expected to ultimately total 270 million barrels (43,000,000 m^{3}), drew a great deal of attention to the trend where oil was trapped along the Bakken pinchout. In 2007, production from Elm Coulee averaged 53,000 barrels per day (8,400 m^{3}/d)—more than the entire state of Montana a few years earlier. The Mondak Field to the southeast of Elm Coulee extended the productive pinchout trend into North Dakota. Elm Coulee was key to later Bakken development because it combined horizontal wells and hydraulic fracturing, and targeted the dolomitic middle Bakken member rather than the shales of the upper or lower Bakken.

=== East side trap ===
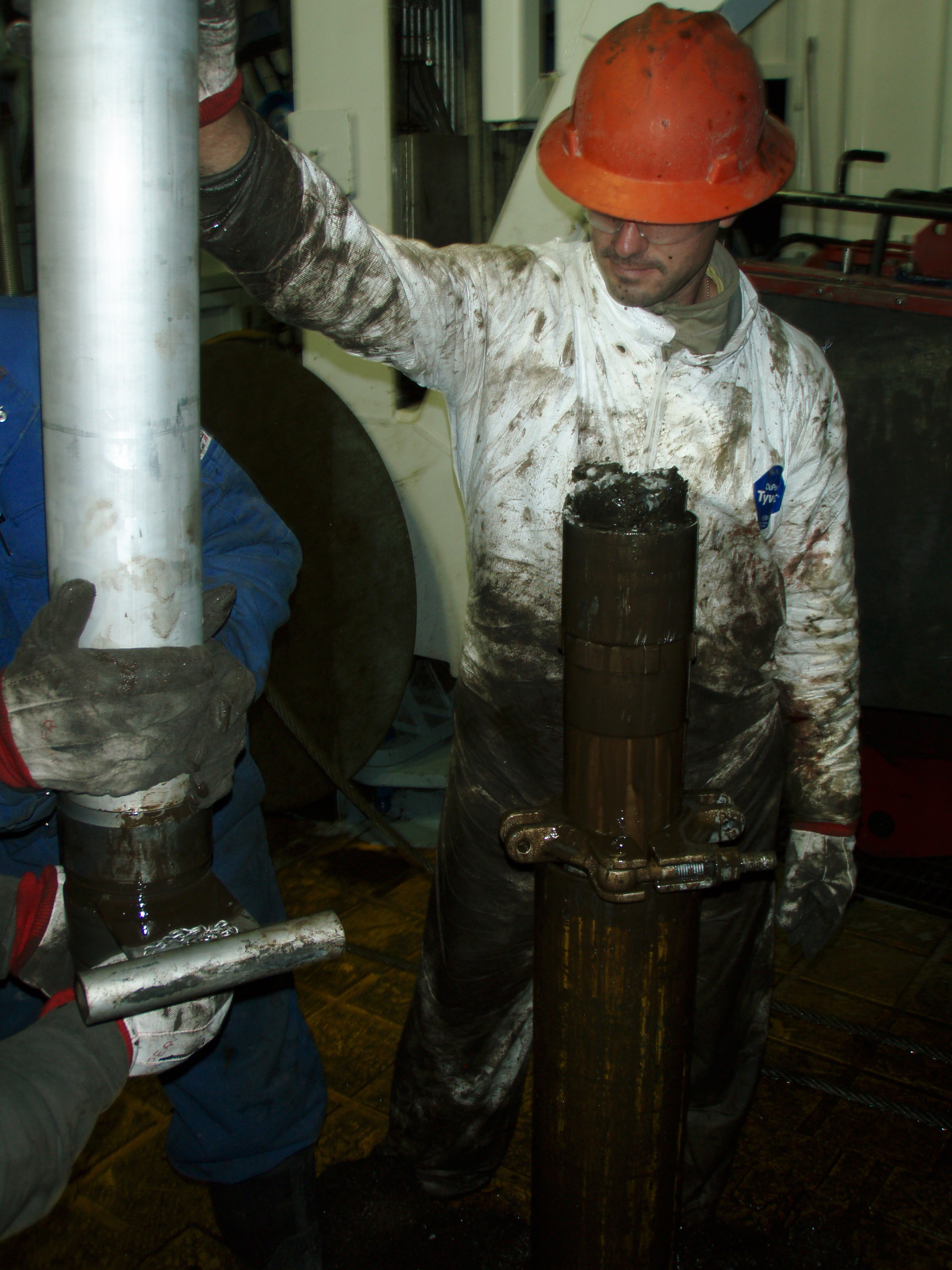
Pulling the Bakken core out of the core barrel

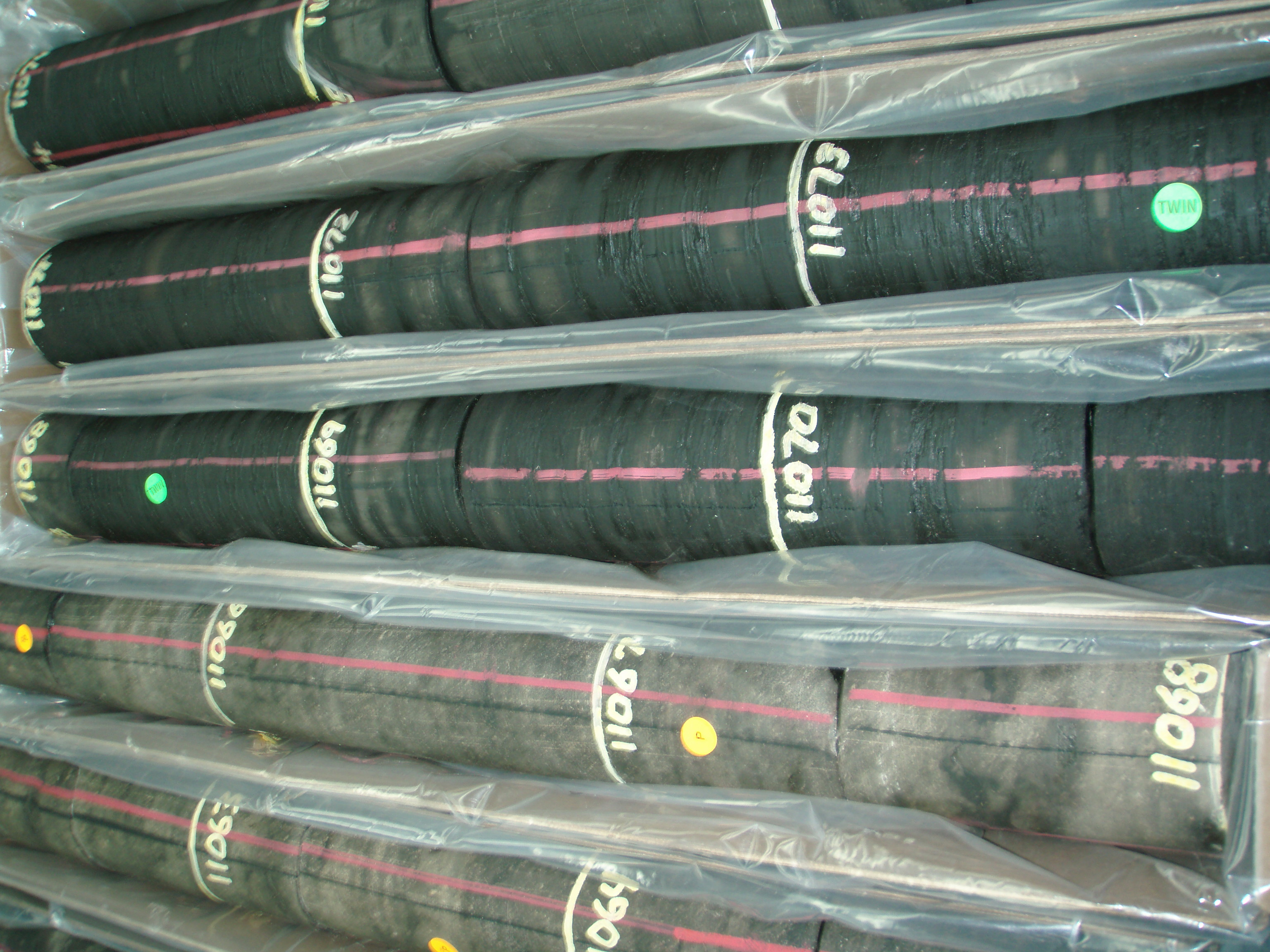
Bakken Core

New interest developed in 2006 when EOG Resources reported that a single well it had drilled into an oil-rich layer of shale near Parshall, North Dakota, was anticipated to produce 700,000 barrels (110,000 m^{3}) of oil. At Parshall, the abrupt eastern limit of the field is formed by the extent of thermally mature Bakken shale; shale farther east is thermally immature, and unproductive.

The Parshall Oil Field discovery, combined with other factors, including an oil-drilling tax break enacted by the state of North Dakota in 2007, shifted attention in the Bakken from Montana to the North Dakota side. The number of wells drilled in the North Dakota Bakken jumped from 300 in 2006 to 457 in 2007.

The viability of the play in North Dakota west of the Nesson Anticline was uncertain until 2009, when Brigham Oil & Gas achieved success with larger hydraulic fracturing treatments, with 25 or more stages.

According to the North Dakota Department of Mineral Resources, daily oil production per well reached a plateau at 145 barrels in June 2010. Although the number of wells tripled between June 2010 and December 2012, oil production per well remained essentially unchanged. However, as more wells were brought online, total oil produced continued to increase until it peaked in mid-2015 at 1.15 million barrels per day. The increase ended because of a slow decline in daily production per well that began in 2013, down to 115 barrels in mid-2015. The peak production value reported by the EIA is about 9% larger. The EIA also reports that the Bakken rig count dropped about 60% over the year ending in October 2015 in response to the collapsing price of oil, while the new-well (initial) oil production per rig increased by 40%, both apparently plateauing at that time. (The production rate from fracked wells decreases more rapidly than from conventional wells drilled in more permeable rock.)

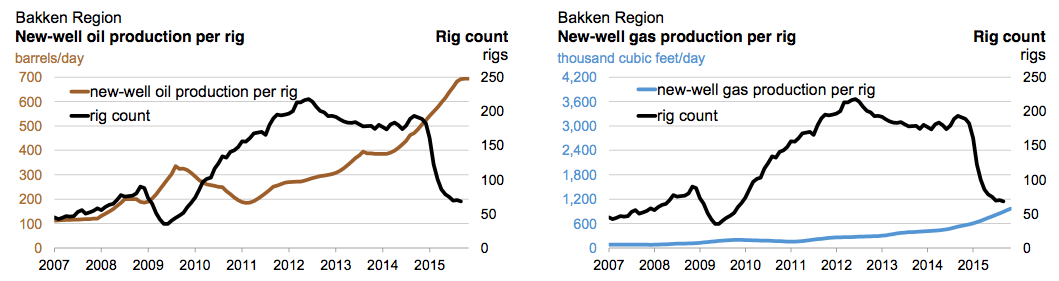
Bakken Region: New-well oil and gas production per rig, and number of rigs

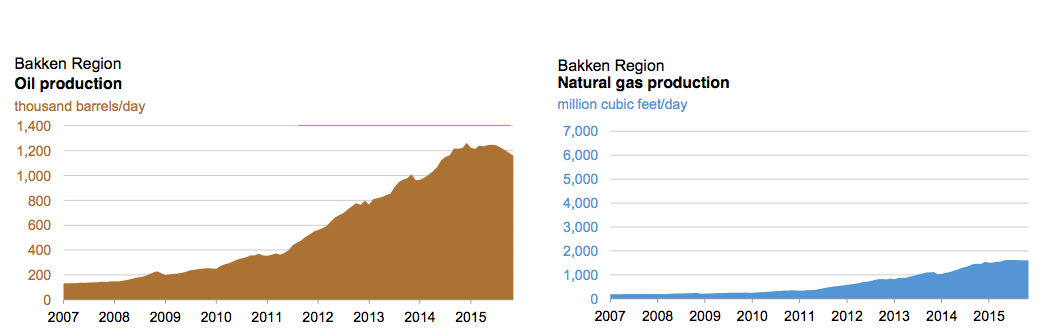
Bakken Region in North Dakota: Oil and gas production rates (US only)

=== Exploration and production ===
Several public companies had drilling rigs in the Bakken trend. These include EOG Resources, Continental Resources, Chord Energy, Marathon Oil Corporation, Diamondback Energy, and Hess Corporation. In Canada, operators include Ridgeback Resources, and Crescent Point Energy. LIG Assets, Inc. elected to participate in a 10% industry position in a group of oil leases located in the Bakken formation in North Dakota. The leases comprise approximately 1,280 acres (520 ha) in McKenzie County, was the most productive oil producing county in the state as of 2015.

By 2015, some companies had sold assets in the Bakken, in favor of exploring the Permian Basin in Texas, due in part to the higher cost of transport to major markets closer to tidewater with lower cost access to foreign oil markets.

Oil extraction in Bakken field declined by around 20% from mid-2015 to mid-2016 and then remained rather stable through mid-2017.

=== Worker safety versus productivity ===
Between the years of 2009 and 2013, there were more than 9,000 injury claims related to the oil and gas industry filed with North Dakota's Workforce Safety & Insurance Agency. Between 2011 and 2015, at least 40 workers died as a result of their industries in North Dakota's oil and gas fields. With the persistently low price of oil in 2015, there was pressure on rigs to maximize drilling speed, with associated additional risks to the crews. In 2015, the oil boom in North Dakota was reported to have brought with it the highest worker fatality rate in the United States. It was reported that on average, an oil worker died in the Bakken every six weeks. One company offered workers daily bonuses of $150 for drilling quickly, while those who proceeded more slowly, exercising caution, were offered only $40 a day. The well owner may avoid liability for accidents if the blame can be assigned to the rig subcontractor. Statutes have been established to prevent this in four other oil-producing states: Texas, Louisiana, New Mexico and Wyoming.

There have also been reports of lack of proper safety precautions in the Bakken oil region. For example, Dustin Payne was an employee in the Bakken region who died after an oil tank he was welding exploded. Payne had previously expressed concerned for his safety. Before the incident, Payne texted his fiancée that he did not feel “comfortable welding this at all.” Al Jazeera correspondent Josh Rushing speculates that Payne's death is one that could have been avoided had the company he worked for had better safety measures in place for workers.

=== Oil and gas infrastructure ===
The great increases in oil and gas production have exceeded the area's pipeline capacity to transport hydrocarbons to markets. There is only one refinery in the area. As a result, the oil and gas prices received have been much lower than the normal North American index prices of West Texas Intermediate for oil and Henry Hub for gas.

The shortage of pipeline capacity has caused some producers to ship oil out of the area by more expensive methods of truck or railroad. It was Bakken crude oil carried by train that caught fire in the deadly 2013 Lac-Mégantic rail disaster in Quebec. Part of the disaster at Lac-Mégantic has been blamed on the fact that much of the highly volatile Bakken oil was mislabeled as lower risk oil and was being shipped in substandard tank cars not designed to contain it. Because of the shortage of pipeline capacity out of North Dakota, over half of its production is sent to market by rail. BNSF Railway and Canadian Pacific Railway reported to Minnesota officials that about 50 Bakken oil trains pass through the state each week, mostly through the Twin Cities of Minneapolis–Saint Paul. At least 15 major accidents involving crude oil or ethanol trains have occurred in the United States and Canada since 2006, and most small cities such as Lac-Megantic are not prepared for oil train explosions and fires.

In March 2013, Canadian pipeline company Enbridge completed a pipeline to take North Dakota oil north into Canada, where it hooks up to Enbridge's main pipeline delivering western Canadian oil to refineries in the American Midwest. Unlike the rejected cross-border Keystone XL Pipeline, the pipeline project to carry American crude across the border was approved by the US government without controversy.

Absent the infrastructure to produce and export natural gas, it is merely flared on the spot; a 2013 study estimated the cost at $100 million per month.

=== Effects of the boom ===
The North Dakota oil boom has given those who own mineral rights large incomes from lease bonuses and royalties. The boom has reduced unemployment and given the state of North Dakota a billion-dollar budget surplus. North Dakota, which ranked 38th in per capita gross domestic product (GDP) in 2001, rose steadily with the Bakken boom, and now has per capita GDP 29% above the national average.

The industrialization and population boom has put a strain on water supplies, sewage systems, available housing and government services of the small towns and ranches in the area.

Increasing economic prosperity has also brought increasing crime and social problems.

== Environmental Issues ==
=== Violent Crime ===
Research has found an increase in violent crime in areas surrounding the Bakken oil region, primarily among indigenous communities. A study by the University of Colorado Boulder showed that between 2006 and 2012, the rate of violent victimization increased 70% in the Bakken oil region. During this same time, there was no corresponding rise in violent crime found in counties outside of the Bakken oil region. Violent victimizations were down 8% in this same time period in regions outside of the Bakken. The increase of violent victimization by strangers in the Bakken region increased by 53% in the region during those 6 years as well, with the victimization of Black and Native American people 2.5 times higher than corresponding rates for white people. Finally, serious violent victimization was found to increase 30% in the Bakken oil region while simultaneously decreasing 4% in the non-Bakken region.

Author Sari Horwitz for The Washington Post reports that the crime wave surrounding man camps is largely fueled by a market for illegal drugs, mainly heroin and methamphetamine. This has gone on to impact local reservations, which are often short staffed and unable to deal with these serious crimes. There are sometimes only two tribal officers on duty responsible for protecting entire reservations. There is also a lack of substance-abuse treatment centers in the area to help treat the rising number of people struggling with addiction.

This increase in violent crime also disproportionately harms women, with higher rates of sexual assault and rape. Between 2006 and 2012 women saw a 54% surge in the incidence of unlawful sexual contact, primarily driven by an increase in statutory rape reports. This increase in violent crime particularly impacted minority and indigenous women as overall violence rates amongst these groups were the highest in the region.

=== Man Camps ===
Man camps are temporary housing compounds built to support the work force in the region. These camps are prominent in the Bakken oil region as the influx of an overwhelmingly male work force has flooded the region. The camps are made as a response to too many jobs and not enough beds to house all of the new workers. Capital Lodge and Tioga Lodge in the Bakken oil region house up to 3,700 residents.

These man camps have also been blamed for the increase of violent crime in the Bakken oil region. There is an even greater potential harm resulting from man camps when they are located on or near Native communities, which already face higher rates of violence against women. As pointed out by Muscogee Creek law scholar Sarah Deer, this is often due the complicated 2013 reform of the Violence Against Women Act. The 2013 reform is limited to violence committed by spouses, former spouses, or dating partners, making it so that sexual violence committed on reservations often cannot be prosecuted. Legal scholar Ana Condes states that man camps are “hotbeds of rape, domestic violence, and sex trafficking, and American Indian women are frequently targeted due to a perception that men will not be prosecuted for assaulting them”. Author Lily Cohen also writes about this issue saying that “Native women face increased levels of sexual assault, sex trafficking, and other gender based violence when resource extraction projects are located near Native communities”. The trauma that is caused by the increased violent crime stemming from these man camps can also remain within these communities for generations. There has been a recent effort from leaders in man camps to write tighter rules for residents in these facilities to help prevent these issues.

=== Environmental Effects ===
There are many negative consequences to the environment that come from activity on the Bakken oil formation, The Bakken Formation is considered a “carbon bomb” by PBS podcast host Ethan Brown, or a fossil fuel initiative projected to release more than one billion tons of carbon throughout its operational lifespan. The Bakken oil and gas field is also responsible for the leaking of large amounts of methane. Both CO_{2} and methane are amongst some of the most prominent and harmful gasses that contribute to air pollution and increased GHG emissions resulting in climate change.

There are also a host of other environmental impacts coming out of the region including disruption of natural ecosystems and pollution. An article by the National Park Service concerning Theodore Roosevelt National Park, which takes up a portion of the Bakken region, found that the practices in the region can result in many environmental harms. The fracking which occurs can result in the harm and displacement of vital habitat for native plants and animals. Fracking in the region can also result in ground and water pollution from spilled oil and fracking fluids. In just one week, more than 60 spills were reported in North Dakota's Bakken oil and gas fields in 2024. Man camps that house workers also contribute to pollution. In one instance, a camp outside of Williston was shut down after allowing sewage to discharge openly over the property.

== See also ==
- Double H Pipeline
- Pony Express Pipeline
- Dakota Access Pipeline
