= North Dakota Man Camp Project =

The North Dakota Man Camp Project is an interdisciplinary project aiming to document the crew camps of the Bakken Oil Patch, North Dakota. The project was founded by University of North Dakota (UND) scholar of social work Bret Weber and UND historian Bill Caraher, as well as historians Aaron Barth and Kostis Kourelis, archeologist Richard Rothaus and photographers John Holmgren and Kyle Cassidy.
