= Ludington, Montana =

- Unincorporated community
- Location within Montana Location within the United States
- Coordinates: 47°49′34″N 104°03′42″W
- Country: United States
- State: Montana
- County: Richland
- Elevation: 1,913 ft (583 m)
- Time zone: UTC-7 (Mountain (MST))
  - Summer (DST): UTC-6 (MDT)
- Area code: 406
- GNIS feature ID: 773757

Ludington is an unincorporated community in Richland County, Montana, United States.
