= Girard, Montana =

Girard
- Unincorporated place
- Country: United States
- State: Montana
- County: Richland County
- Elevation: 2,405 ft (733 m)
- Time zone: UTC-7 (Mountain (MST))
  - Summer (DST): UTC-6 (MDT)
- ZIP code: 59270

Girard is an unincorporated community in Richland County, Montana, United States. It is 2,405 feet (733 meters) above sea level.
