= Savage, Montana =

- Census-designated place
- Location within Montana Location within the United States
- Coordinates: 47°27′13″N 104°20′29″W
- Country: United States
- State: Montana
- County: Richland

Area
  - Total: 0.72 sq mi (1.86 km^{2})
  - Land: 0.72 sq mi (1.86 km^{2})
  - Water: 0 sq mi (0.00 km^{2})
- Elevation: 1,982 ft (604 m)

Population (2020)
  - Total: 303
  - Density: 422.6/sq mi (163.15/km^{2})
- Time zone: UTC-7 (Mountain (MST))
  - Summer (DST): UTC-6 (MDT)
- ZIP code: 59262
- Area code: 406
- GNIS feature ID: 2408495

Savage is an unincorporated community and census-designated place (CDP) in Richland County, Montana, United States. Savage is located on the Yellowstone River and Montana Highway 16, 20 miles (32 km) south-southwest of Sidney. As of the 2020 census, Savage had a population of 303.

Savage was first listed as a CDP prior to the 2010 census. In previous censuses, the area was counted within the former Knife River CDP.

== History ==
Savage is named for H. M. Savage, supervising engineer for the U. S. Reclamation Service. For many years it was a busy shipping point for grain farmers and river-bottom beet growers. Sugar beet farms benefited with the opening of a sugar beet factory in Sidney in 1925.

== Recreation ==
Basic services are available in the community and boating access to the Yellowstone River is nearby.

== Climate ==
According to the Köppen Climate Classification system, Savage has a semi-arid climate, abbreviated "BSk" on climate maps.

Climate data for Savage, Montana (1991–2020 normals, extremes 1905–2022)
Month	Jan	Feb	Mar	Apr	May	Jun	Jul	Aug	Sep	Oct	Nov	Dec	Year
Record high °F (°C)	66 (19)	70 (21)	87 (31)	95 (35)	104 (40)	109 (43)	111 (44)	110 (43)	104 (40)	93 (34)	78 (26)	73 (23)	111 (44)
Mean maximum °F (°C)	49.8 (9.9)	53.5 (11.9)	70.0 (21.1)	80.7 (27.1)	88.0 (31.1)	94.7 (34.8)	98.8 (37.1)	99.1 (37.3)	94.9 (34.9)	82.2 (27.9)	64.6 (18.1)	51.0 (10.6)	101.2 (38.4)
Mean daily maximum °F (°C)	28.9 (−1.7)	34.1 (1.2)	47.4 (8.6)	60.9 (16.1)	71.5 (21.9)	80.2 (26.8)	88.2 (31.2)	87.6 (30.9)	77.2 (25.1)	60.4 (15.8)	43.5 (6.4)	32.0 (0.0)	59.3 (15.2)
Daily mean °F (°C)	17.8 (−7.9)	22.3 (−5.4)	34.2 (1.2)	46.4 (8.0)	57.0 (13.9)	66.2 (19.0)	72.8 (22.7)	71.3 (21.8)	61.3 (16.3)	47.0 (8.3)	32.2 (0.1)	21.3 (−5.9)	45.8 (7.7)
Mean daily minimum °F (°C)	6.8 (−14.0)	10.5 (−11.9)	21.1 (−6.1)	31.8 (−0.1)	42.5 (5.8)	52.1 (11.2)	57.4 (14.1)	55.1 (12.8)	45.4 (7.4)	33.5 (0.8)	20.9 (−6.2)	10.7 (−11.8)	32.3 (0.2)
Mean minimum °F (°C)	−21.9 (−29.9)	−14.7 (−25.9)	−4.5 (−20.3)	14.8 (−9.6)	26.5 (−3.1)	40.6 (4.8)	46.7 (8.2)	42.4 (5.8)	30.1 (−1.1)	15.5 (−9.2)	−0.9 (−18.3)	−15.9 (−26.6)	−28.3 (−33.5)
Record low °F (°C)	−46 (−43)	−53 (−47)	−31 (−35)	−11 (−24)	13 (−11)	29 (−2)	37 (3)	32 (0)	15 (−9)	−14 (−26)	−24 (−31)	−42 (−41)	−53 (−47)
Average precipitation inches (mm)	0.38 (9.7)	0.32 (8.1)	0.55 (14)	1.27 (32)	2.59 (66)	2.79 (71)	2.28 (58)	1.46 (37)	1.46 (37)	1.17 (30)	0.58 (15)	0.42 (11)	15.27 (388)
Average snowfall inches (cm)	5.8 (15)	5.3 (13)	4.3 (11)	2.4 (6.1)	0.3 (0.76)	0.0 (0.0)	0.0 (0.0)	0.0 (0.0)	0.0 (0.0)	1.7 (4.3)	3.6 (9.1)	6.2 (16)	29.6 (75)
Average precipitation days (≥ 0.01 in)	4.6	4.1	4.8	5.7	9.2	9.6	7.4	6.1	5.4	5.9	4.2	4.7	71.7
Average snowy days (≥ 0.1 in)	4.8	4.4	3.6	1.0	0.2	0.0	0.0	0.0	0.0	0.8	2.8	4.5	22.1
Source: NOAA

== Demographics ==
Historical population
Census	Pop.	Note	%±
2020	303		—
U.S. Decennial Census

== Education ==
Savage Public School educates students from kindergarten through 12th grade. Savage High School's team name is the Warriors.
