= Parshall, North Dakota =

Parshall, North Dakota dibiarugareesh (Hidatsa)
- City
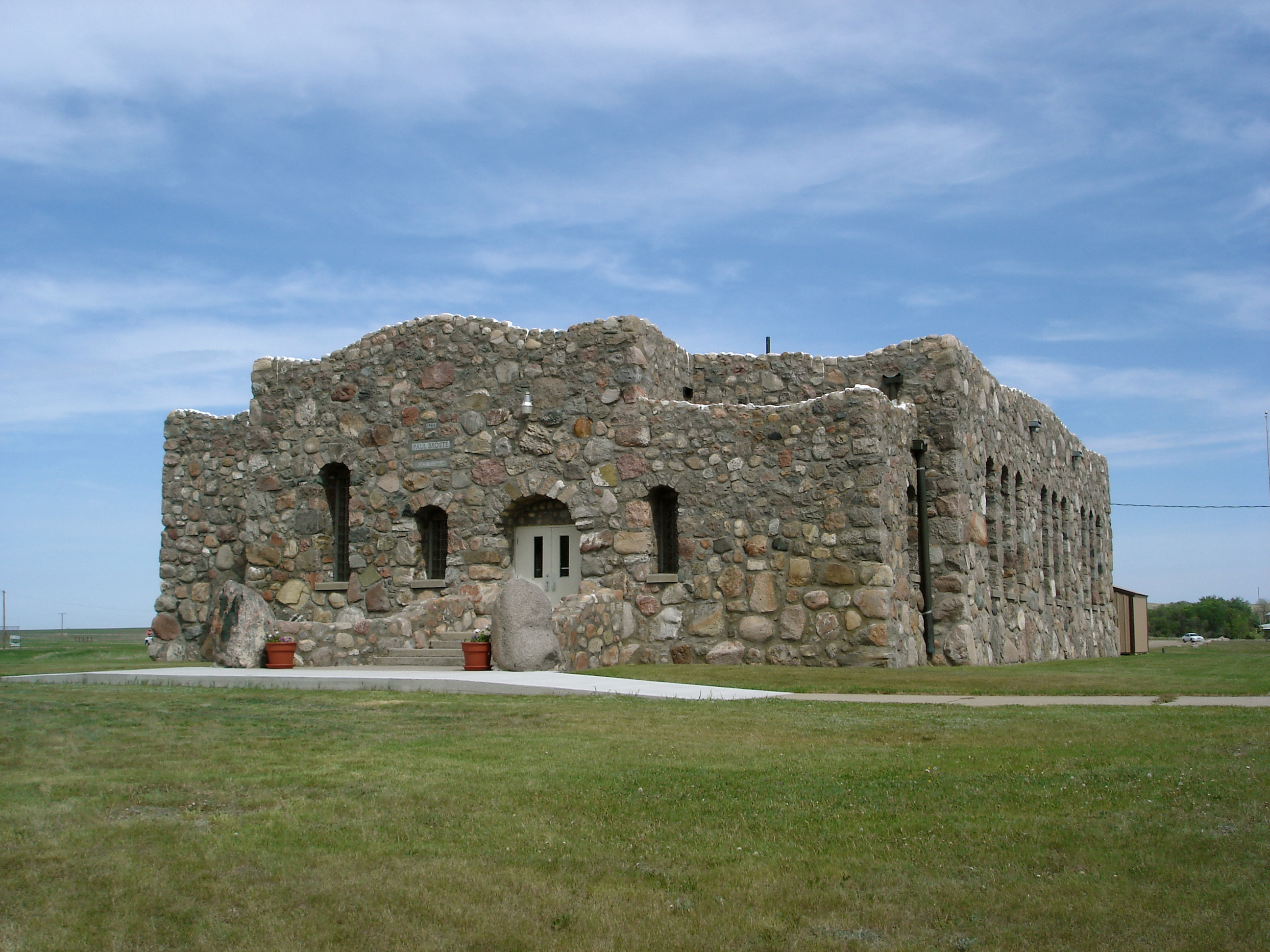
- Paul Broste Rock Museum in Parshall

- Location of Parshall, North Dakota

- Location within the United States
- Coordinates: 47°57′34″N 102°08′02″W
- Country: United States
- State: North Dakota
- County: Mountrail
- Founded: 1914

Government
  - Mayor: Kyle Christianson

Area
  - Total: 3.54 sq mi (9.18 km^{2})
  - Land: 3.54 sq mi (9.18 km^{2})
  - Water: 0 sq mi (0.00 km^{2})
- Elevation: 1,978 ft (603 m)

Population (2020)
  - Total: 949
  - Estimate (2022): 895
  - Density: 267.6/sq mi (103.34/km^{2})
- Time zone: UTC-6 (Central (CST))
  - Summer (DST): UTC-5 (CDT)
- ZIP code: 58770
- Area code: 701
- FIPS code: 38-60940
- GNIS feature ID: 1036214
- Website: parshallnd.com

Parshall (Hidatsa: dibiarugareesh) is a city lying within the jurisdictional boundaries of the Mandan, Hidatsa, and Arikara Nation. It is located on the Fort Berthold Indian Reservation in Mountrail County, North Dakota, United States. The population was 949 at the 2020 census. Parshall was founded in 1914 by George Parshall, and is the home of the Paul Broste Rock Museum.

Randy Hedberg, a former NFL quarterback, was born and raised in Parshall. Another notable native of Parshall was Raymond Cross, a stand out high school basketball player and later a law professor in Montana.

== Geography ==
According to the United States Census Bureau, the city has a total area of 0.55 square miles (1.42 km^{2}), all land.

=== Climate ===
This climatic region is typified by large seasonal temperature differences, with warm to hot (and often humid) summers and cold (sometimes severely cold) winters. According to the Köppen climate classification system, Parshall has a humid continental climate, abbreviated Dfb on climate maps, though it borders a cool semi-arid climate (BSk).

On February 15, 1936, Parshall recorded a temperature of −60 °F or −51.1 °C, setting a state record low temperature, which still stands today. Relatively nearby Steele, ND recorded a state record high of 121 °F or 49.4 °C less than five months later.

During the calendar year 1934, in the midst of the severe multi-year drought that affected most of North America during much of the 1930s, Parshall recorded a total of 4.02 inches or 102.1 millimetres of precipitation, less than 27 percent of the long-term normal and much less than normally falls in most of the Sonoran Desert.

Climate data for Parshall, North Dakota, 1931–1979 normals and extremes
Month	Jan	Feb	Mar	Apr	May	Jun	Jul	Aug	Sep	Oct	Nov	Dec	Year
Record high °F (°C)	55 (13)	64 (18)	80 (27)	92 (33)	101 (38)	104 (40)	112 (44)	107 (42)	103 (39)	96 (36)	75 (24)	63 (17)	112 (44)
Mean daily maximum °F (°C)	17.2 (−8.2)	23.0 (−5.0)	35.3 (1.8)	53.2 (11.8)	67.4 (19.7)	75.4 (24.1)	83.9 (28.8)	82.9 (28.3)	71.1 (21.7)	58.9 (14.9)	37.5 (3.1)	24.7 (−4.1)	52.5 (11.4)
Daily mean °F (°C)	6.0 (−14.4)	11.8 (−11.2)	24.2 (−4.3)	40.5 (4.7)	53.4 (11.9)	62.2 (16.8)	68.8 (20.4)	66.9 (19.4)	55.8 (13.2)	44.8 (7.1)	26.6 (−3.0)	13.9 (−10.1)	39.6 (4.2)
Mean daily minimum °F (°C)	−5.2 (−20.7)	0.4 (−17.6)	13.2 (−10.4)	27.8 (−2.3)	39.4 (4.1)	49.0 (9.4)	53.8 (12.1)	50.9 (10.5)	40.6 (4.8)	30.7 (−0.7)	15.8 (−9.0)	3.2 (−16.0)	26.6 (−3.0)
Record low °F (°C)	−45 (−43)	−60 (−51)	−35 (−37)	−16 (−27)	13 (−11)	26 (−3)	31 (−1)	25 (−4)	4 (−16)	−6 (−21)	−29 (−34)	−37 (−38)	−60 (−51)
Average precipitation inches (mm)	0.31 (7.9)	0.33 (8.4)	0.41 (10)	1.24 (31)	2.16 (55)	3.51 (89)	2.26 (57)	1.83 (46)	1.66 (42)	0.70 (18)	0.40 (10)	0.33 (8.4)	15.14 (382.7)
Average snowfall inches (cm)	3.9 (9.9)	3.6 (9.1)	3.4 (8.6)	2.6 (6.6)	0.6 (1.5)	0.0 (0.0)	0.0 (0.0)	0.0 (0.0)	0.3 (0.76)	1.4 (3.6)	3.5 (8.9)	3.8 (9.7)	23.1 (58.66)
Average precipitation days (≥ 0.01 in)	4.7	4.0	4.8	6.2	8.6	10.9	7.9	7.3	6.4	4.4	4.3	4.1	73.6
Average snowy days (≥ 0.1 in)	4.0	3.2	2.8	1.3	0.2	0.0	0.0	0.0	0.2	0.9	2.6	3.5	18.7
Source: XMACIS2 (precip/precip days, snow/snow days 1916–1979)

== Demographics ==
Historical population
Census	Pop.	Note	%±
1920	376		—
1930	470		25.0%
1940	570		21.3%
1950	935		64.0%
1960	1,216		30.1%
1970	1,246		2.5%
1980	1,059		−15.0%
1990	943		−11.0%
2000	981		4.0%
2010	903		−8.0%
2020	949		5.1%
2022 (est.)	895		−5.7%
U.S. Decennial Census; 2020 Census

=== 2010 census ===
As of the census of 2010, there were 903 people, 313 households, and 220 families residing in the city. The population density was 1,641.8 inhabitants per square mile (633.9/km^{2}). There were 364 housing units at an average density of 661.8 per square mile (255.5/km^{2}). The racial makeup of the city was 30.6% White, 0.3% African American, 62.7% Native American, 0.7% from other races, and 5.8% from two or more races. Hispanic or Latino of any race were 6.5% of the population.

There were 313 households, of which 44.1% had children under the age of 18 living with them, 38.7% were married couples living together, 22.0% had a female householder with no husband present, 9.6% had a male householder with no wife present, and 29.7% were non-families. 24.3% of all households were made up of individuals, and 7.3% had someone living alone who was 65 years of age or older. The average household size was 2.86 and the average family size was 3.41.

The median age in the city was 31.6 years. 32.2% of residents were under the age of 18; 10.2% were between the ages of 18 and 24; 23.2% were from 25 to 44; 25.6% were from 45 to 64; and 9% were 65 years of age or older. The gender makeup of the city was 49.8% male and 50.2% female.

=== 2000 census ===
As of the census of 2000, there were 981 people, 339 households, and 240 families residing in the city. The population density was 1,803.4 inhabitants per square mile (696.3/km^{2}). There were 392 housing units at an average density of 720.6 per square mile (278.2/km^{2}). The racial makeup of the city was 41.79% White, 0.31% African American, 54.54% Native American, 1.22% from other races, and 2.14% from two or more races. Hispanic or Latino of any race were 3.26% of the population.

There were 339 households, out of which 39.5% had children under the age of 18 living with them, 39.2% were married couples living together, 25.4% had a female householder with no husband present, and 29.2% were non-families. 26.3% of all households were made up of individuals, and 15.6% had someone living alone who was 65 years of age or older. The average household size was 2.75 and the average family size was 3.23.

In the city, the population was spread out, with 33.1% under the age of 18, 8.3% from 18 to 24, 23.4% from 25 to 44, 16.8% from 45 to 64, and 18.3% who were 65 years of age or older. The median age was 33 years. For every 100 females, there were 91.2 males. For every 100 females age 18 and over, there were 84.8 males.

The median income for a household in the city was $24,500, and the median income for a family was $27,222. Males had a median income of $23,558 versus $21,750 for females. The per capita income for the city was $11,459. About 21.6% of families and 27.7% of the population were below the poverty line, including 35.6% of those under age 18 and 20.3% of those age 65 or over.

== Education ==
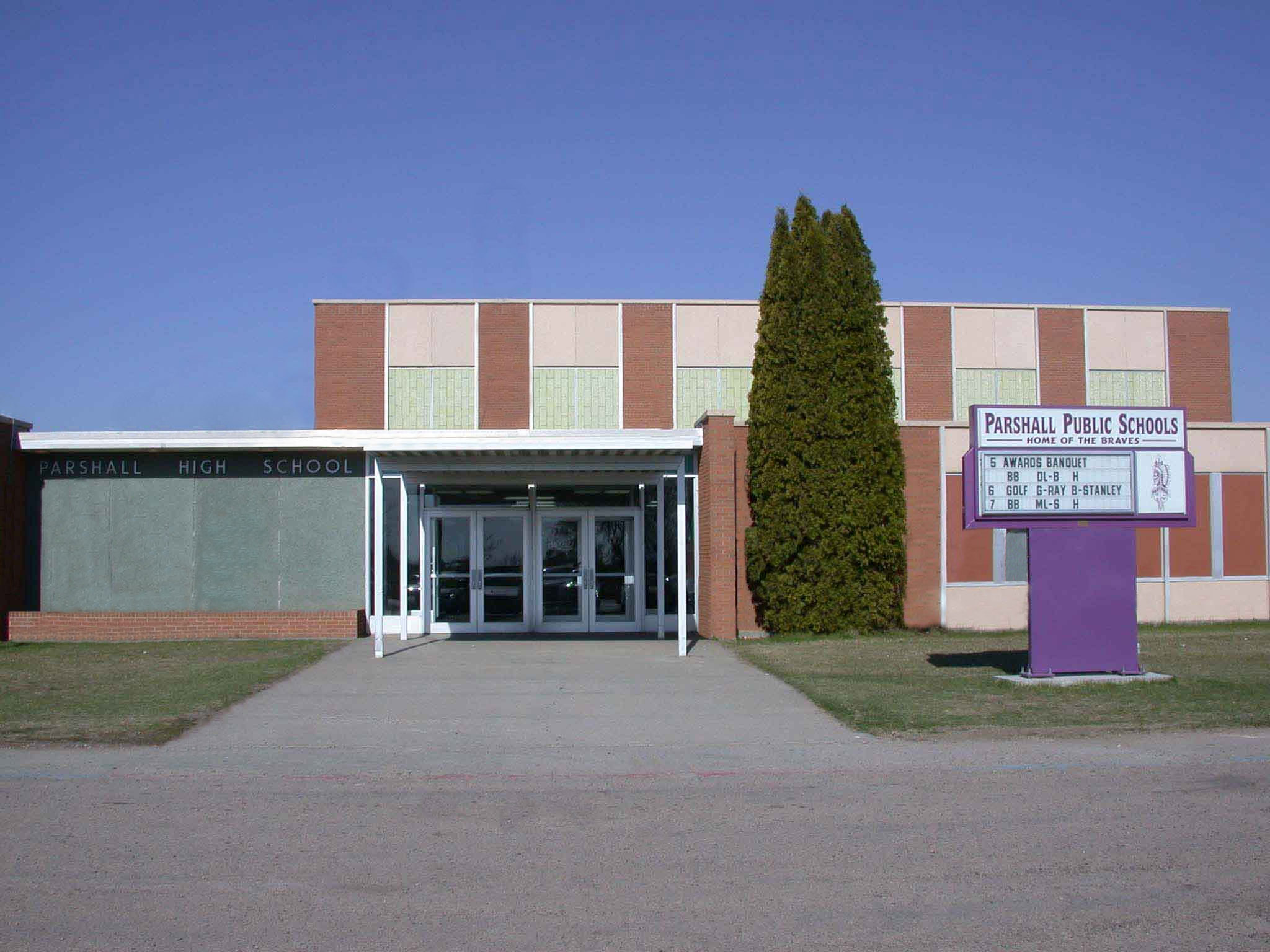
Parshall High School in 2008

The school district is Parshall Public Schools.

There are two schools in Parshall operated by the school district: the public elementary school and the public high school.

== Demography ==
Along with White Shield, North Dakota, Parshall is home to speakers of the Arikara language.

== Oil development ==
Parshall is, perhaps, best known nationally for its namesake Parshall Oil Field, which surrounds the town. The 2006 discovery of the Parshall Field started the North Dakota oil boom.

Aspects of the oil boom near Parshall were presented in the series Boomtown on Discovery Communications cable channel Planet Green.
