= Parshall Public Schools =

School district in North Dakota, USA

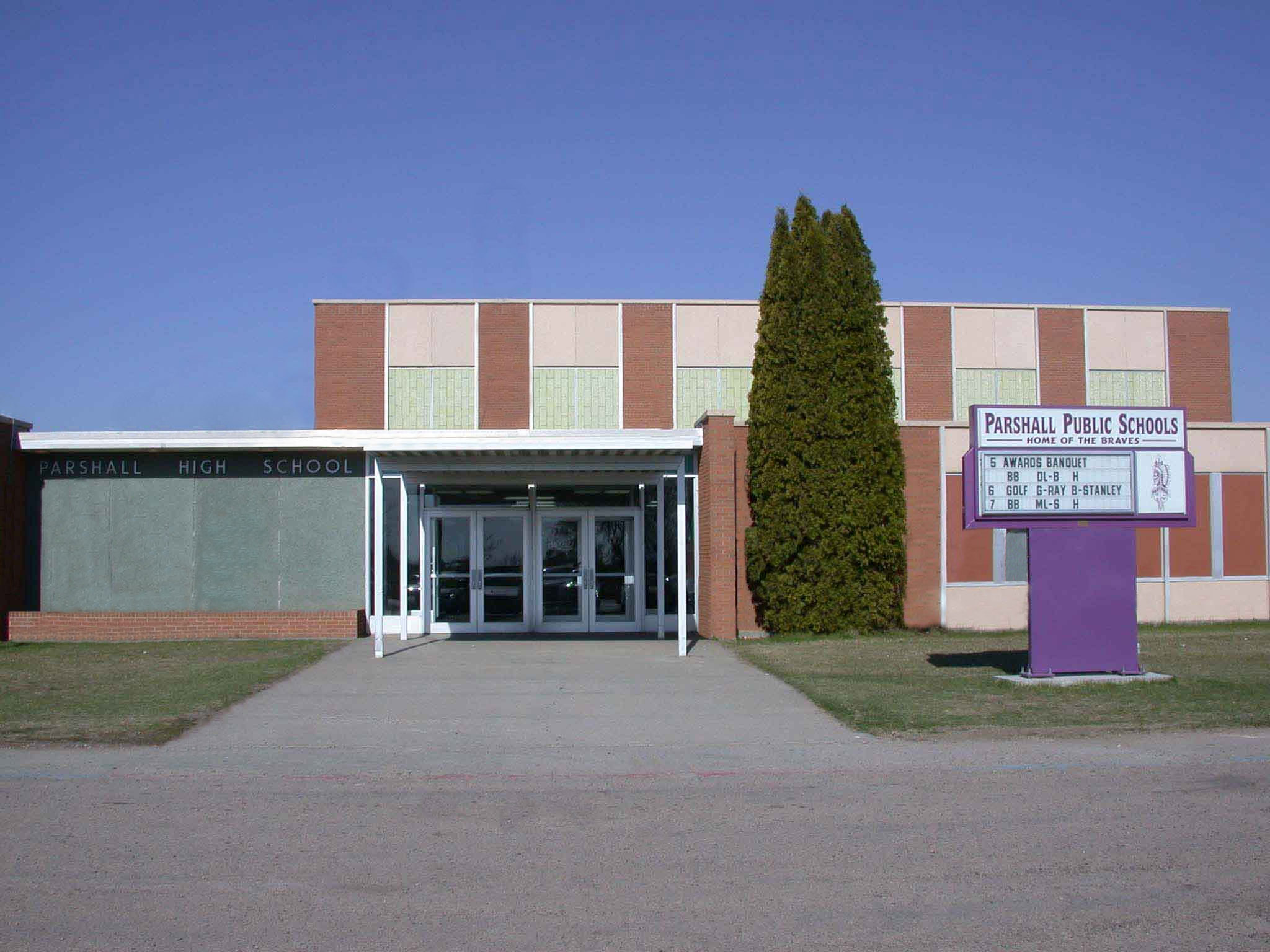
Parshall High School in 2008

Parshall School District 3, also known as Parshall Public Schools, is a school district headquartered in Parshall, North Dakota. It operates two schools: Parshall Elementary School and Parshall High School.

It serves Parshall in Mountrail County, and also extends into McLean County.

In the 2016–2017 school year the district had 265 students, and in the 2017–2018 school year the district had 285 students.

== History ==
In the 1960s the district had elementary and secondary buildings built. By 2018 the school buildings had issues with asbestos, plumbing, and other building-related problems.

In 2017 the district attempted to pass a bond, but the 55% approval from voters was not sufficient to get the bond passed. However, in May 2018 the bond got 74% approval and so was passed. In summer 2018 the district was scheduled to begin construction on the current high school building, and it also planned to renovate the elementary school; the two were to cost $15.2 million. Mandan, Hidatsa and Arikara Nation provided $3.5 million for the facility prior to the last bond referendum and planned in summer 2018 to provide another $3.5 million. Additionally the new high school and a renovation of the elementary school was funded by a $5.4 million bond. The district plans to eventually replace the elementary building with an addition to the new high school building so there is one building for all students.
