= North Dakota oil boom =

Period of growth in oil extraction, 2006–2015

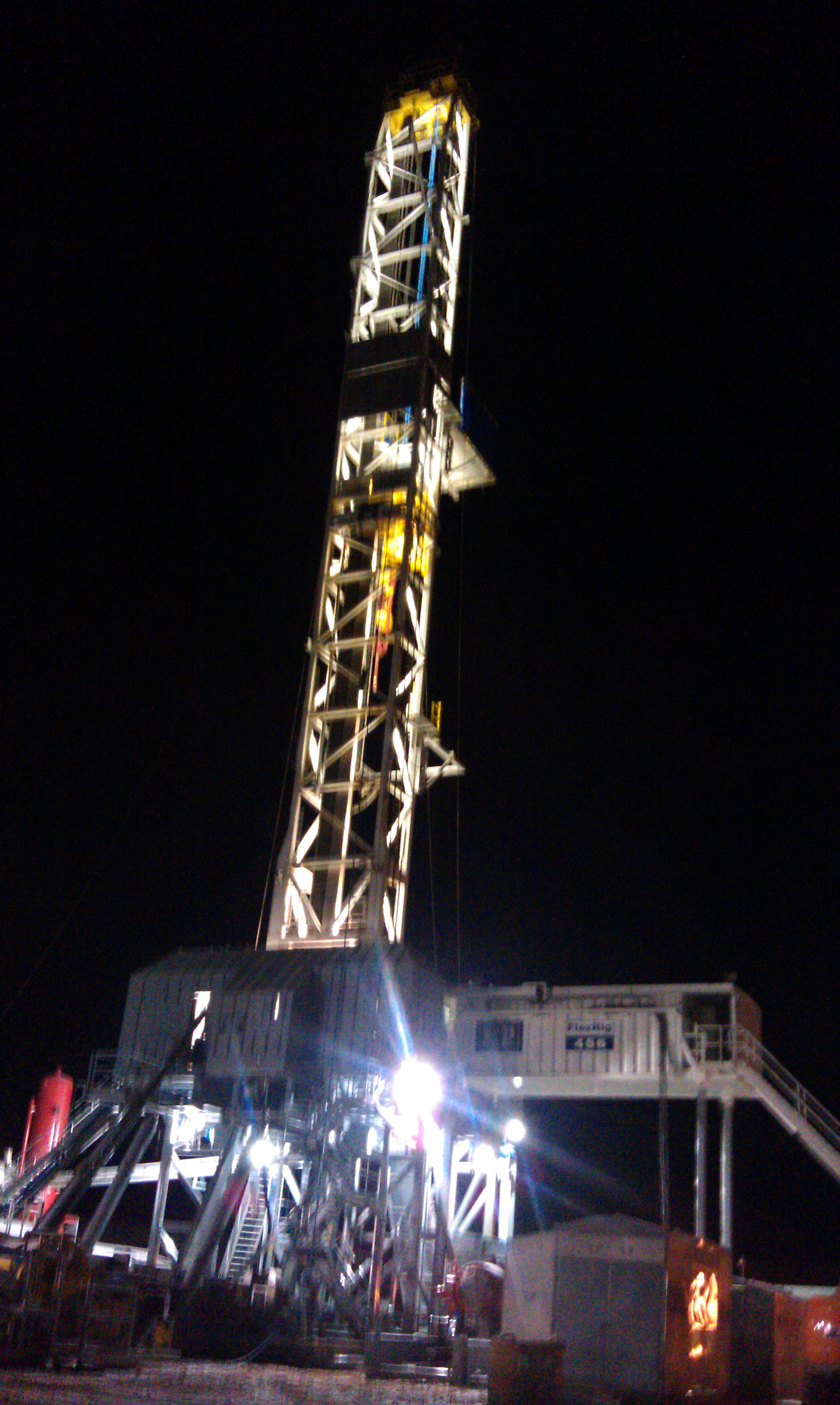
Night view of H&P drilling the Bakken.

The North Dakota oil boom was the period of rapidly expanding oil extraction from the Bakken Formation in the state of North Dakota that lasted from the discovery of the Parshall Oil Field in 2006, and peaked in 2012, with slightly less than 100,000 barrels of oil being produced per day in 2007 to about 1,000,000 barrels produced per day in 2014. By 2015, there was substantially less growth noted due to a global decline in oil prices. The Boom was led by companies such as Continental Resources, Whiting Petroleum, Hess, ExxonMobil and EOG Resources.

The oil boom was largely due to the successful use of horizontal drilling and hydraulic fracturing, which made unconventional tight oil deposits recoverable. Contributing to the boom was a push to commence drilling and production on oil and gas leases before the expiration of their primary term, commonly three to five years, at which time the leases would terminate unless a producing well was drilled on the lease. But once production was established, the leases continued as long as oil and gas were continually produced.

== Social effects ==
Sociologist John S. Gilmore presents the idea of a boom town 'problem triangle'. The notion is as follows: Local services do not keep up with population growth, degrading the quality of life in the community. Lower quality of life makes it more difficult to attract the additional population needed to support growth of services. Private investors also are often hesitant to invest in services, as chaos and crime are often perpetuated in these areas. The oil industry relies on employees, but these employees in turn rely on other workers (dining, retail, etc.) and services (law enforcement, school systems, health care, etc.). When the additional population needed for other businesses and services are not present, the oil employees cannot live healthy, secure lives.

=== Oil Rights and Indigenous Communities ===
In the Bakken Formation, oil rights are often disputed as they can contradict past treaties between Indigenous nations and the United States that have been established for centuries. This is at-odds with some Indigenous belief systems, as scholar Paul Guernsey as pointed out: Some Indigenous peoples disagree with the concept of private property and view land as something that can’t be commodified.

One example of such issues, according to historian Nick Estes, is the Dakota Access Pipeline, which runs from the Bakken Oil Fields to Illinois, traverses through sacred Indigenous burial sites, permanent reservation boundaries of the Great Sioux Nation, tributaries of the Missouri River, and violates the 1868 Fort Laramie Treaty. Holding significance as land and for indigenous peoples in North Dakota is heavily connected with cultural identity, communal relationships, and spiritual significance, based on stewardship and a deep sense of belonging. For example, Estes explains that the Dakota people who inhabit the Bakken region believe water shaped the earth and created sacred stones we now walk upon today, and are now concerned that the same water is being used to destroy their history. In response, property ownership can come with conflict, stemming from matters of class, race and colonialism. According to scholar Vanessa Watts, Native people view land as an individual living being with agency.

According to geographer Sophia Ford, these disputes stem from the fact that mineral claims such as those on oil deposits are difficult to access and complex to analyze when acquired. Ensuring that predominantly wealthy individuals can buy up mineral rights and drill from the surface property above. This vague classification of purchasing mineral rights also prevents individuals from knowing what they can purchase and at what value. Those who can purchase mineral rights accumulate wealth while Indigenous communities have little say in what happens to the land that lies below the surface of their properties. Therefore, they have to face the negative environmental and health effects that this may have on their community. According to scholars Paul Guernsey and Sophia Ford, oil rights and drilling in the Bakken are an example of this dispute between Indigenous views of land as an actor and colonial views of land as a commodity to extract money from.

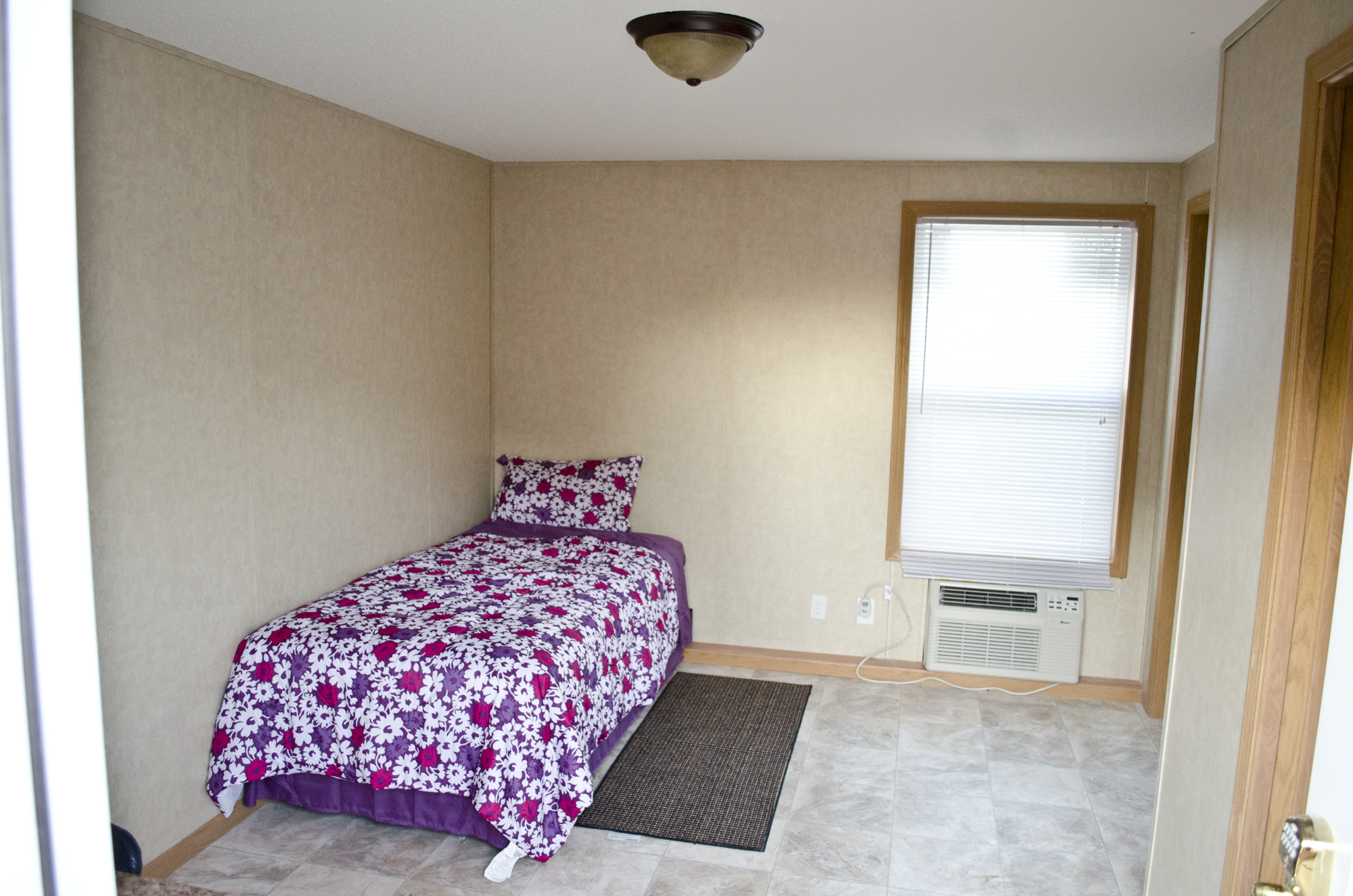
Example of makeshift housing in man camps due to lack of real housing to match booming populations

=== Effects on Indigenous Communities ===
Crime affected the relationship between boom newcomers and Indigenous peoples residing in those areas. Indigenous peoples saw newcomers as threats to their access to resources and services. However, the longest residing people, such as the Standing Rock Sioux and Lakota tribes, were completely disregarded in decision making in land usage and development for oil fields. One instance particularly caught the eye of the public, when the Dakota Access Pipeline risked the people's access to land, water, and sacred sites. The issue ultimately made its way to the U.S. Supreme Court. The pipeline disrupts water flow from the Mississippi to the tribal land in order to deliver oil from the Bakken to Illinois. The pipeline also directly violates the Fort Laramie Treaty (Article II), which guarantees [20] the 'undisturbed use and occupation of the sovereign nation's reservation lands.

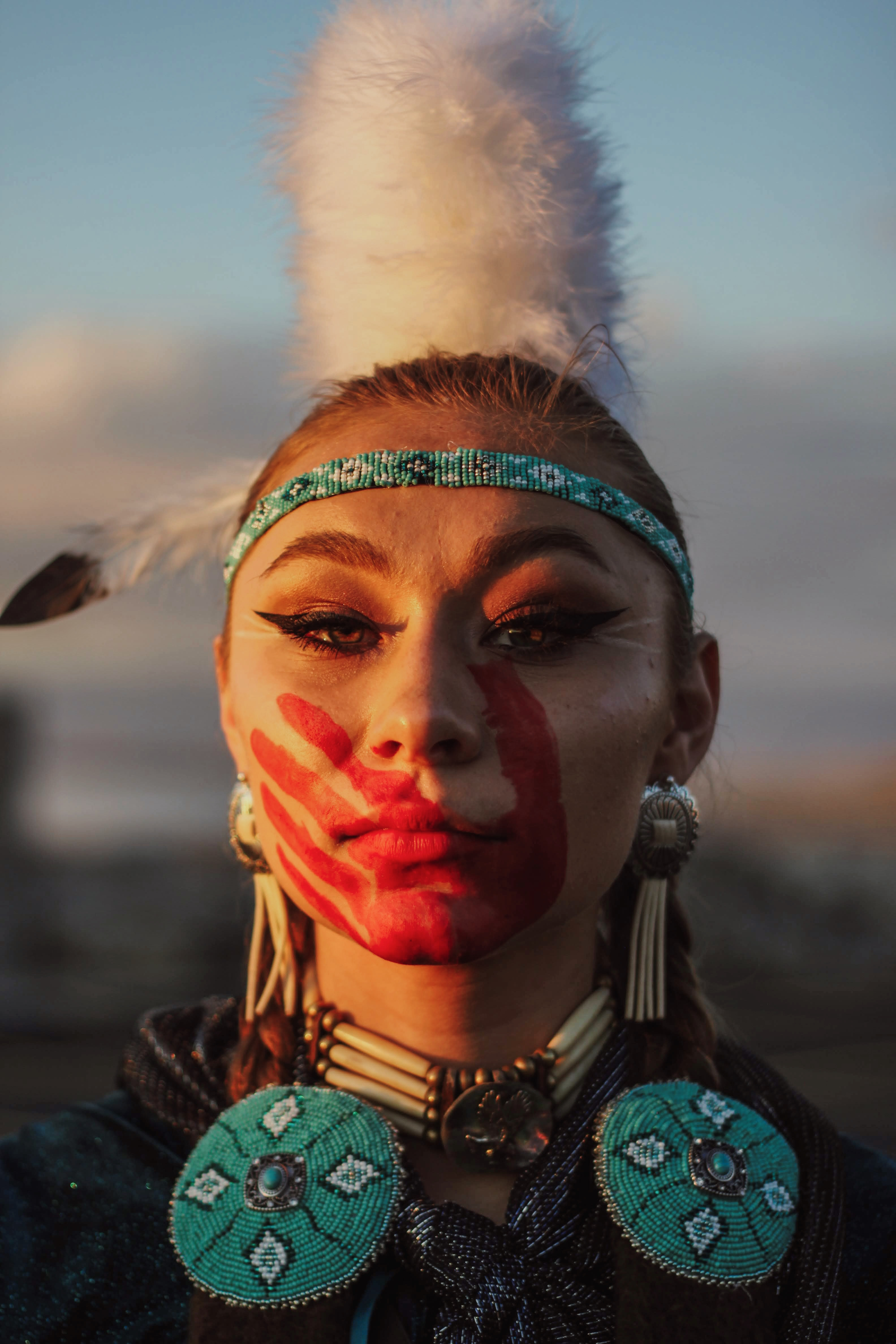
Native American women were particularly targeted in violent crime, which was a factor in the rise of MMIW.

=== Man Camps and MMIW ===
The addition of thousands of oil workers led to a housing shortage, requiring the construction of man camps. These portable housing units were popularized due to North Dakota proliferating usage specifically. Law enforcement agencies reported sharp increases in violent crime, drug trafficking, and gun crimes in these areas, while nearby Indigenous communities reported increased rates of sexual assault, human trafficking, sex trafficking, and missing and murdered Indigenous women.

There is a prevalent notion among oilfield workers in the Bakken that there will be no consequences for assaults against Indigenous women. This exacerbates the ongoing Missing and Murdered Indigenous Women Crisis. Native American women experienced 2.5 times higher victimization of crime than other races- and women experienced 54% increase in unlawful sexual contact, most often statutory rape.

The National Institute of Justice reported that instances of sexual violence against Indigenous women and children increased 75% in Fort Berthold Indian Reservation a reservation in the Bakken region, post-boom. Further studies have shown that this increase was dramatic and did not correspond with rates of violent crime in areas outside of the Bakken region, which actually decreased during this time.

According to a text by Indigenous scholars Sarah Deer and Elizabeth Kronk Warner, the vast majority of sexual assaults reported in this area have been perpetrated by workers living in the man camps who cross into the nearby Indigenous communities. These crimes often went unpunished, as Indigenous nations have been stripped of their ability to have criminal governance over non-Indigenous peoples who commit crimes on Indigenous lands. This stems from the 1978 case Oliphant vs. Suquamish Indian Tribe, in which the Supreme Court declared that because Indigenous nations were somewhat dependent on the United States federal government, their sovereignty was limited, as too was their ability to prosecute non- Indigenous peoples accused of committing violent crimes on their land. Thus, that ability was designated to the federal government only.

It is also not possible for tribal law enforcement to prosecute non-Indigenous peoples for violent crime against Indigenous women and children that occur outside of their lands, specifically inside man camps. This ability also falls to federal and state governments, which some Native advocacy groups have deemed unwilling to prioritize violent crime against Indigenous peoples.

No background checking and disregard for criminal history in the employment process for the extraction industry exacerbates these increased rates of sexual violence. Those with background histories of sexual violence may find jobs in the extraction industry attractive for their inadequate background checking, as they are excluded from jobs in other fields. After the boom, it was determined by the US Marshall Service and the Fort Berthold tribal law enforcement agency that 20% of sex offenders present in the man camps were unregistered, compared to around 4-5% in the state of North Dakota in general.

The lack of adequate attempts made by state governments, the federal government, and local law enforcement to quell the rise in violent crime committed against Indigenous peoples, specifically the sexual assault of Indigenous women and children, by workers at the rig further exacerbates the MMIW crisis in the US. As A. Skylar Joseph explains in A Modern Trail of Tears: The Missing and Murdered Indigenous Women (MMIW) Crisis in the US, Indigenous women are murdered at a rate of 10 times the national average and are twice as likely to experience sexual assault than any other race in the US. According to historian Rayna Green, these problems manifest, in part, because Native Women have been sexualized and objectified in American culture as a byproduct of television, movies, marketing, and advertising. Oftentimes, Native American Women are portrayed as princesses holding traits such as beauty and virtue. This false perception that is embedded in American culture tends to commodify Indigenous women’s sexuality and prevents them from gaining respect from non-native audiences. Making Native Women more susceptible to mistreatment and sexual violence by American Men.

== Environmental effects ==
Oil extraction in the Bakken contributes greatly to climate change and environmental degradation. According to E.A. Kort, and his peers, the Bakken formation was responsible for 2% of total global ethane emissions in 2014. Ethane acts as a greenhouse gas when released during extraction, contributing to air quality reduction, pollution, and global warming. Extraction can release harmful air pollutants such as ozone, fine particles, sulfate, nitrate, ammonia, and airborne toxics. These Particles in the air can cause lung irritation and in certain situations, a visible haze either as a direct result of the emission or as a chemical reaction to other emissions already in the air.

In addition to producing greenhouse gases, oil extraction in the Bakken region leads to contaminated soil, water, and air that pose the risk of negative health impacts to those living in the area. Including various types of cancer, respiratory problems, increases in skin fungi, nasal and throat irritations, and neurological functions. The risk of these negative effects depends on an individual’s distance from an oil operation and how they interact with local water, produce, and animals. According American Indian historian Nick Estes, the Dakota Access pipeline transports 800,000 barrels of tar sands oil across 1,200 miles of land each day and traverses through 357 tributaries of the Missouri River and the Ogallala aquifer. Which significantly exacerbates the chances of possible water and soil contamination.

As stated by Ott et al., surrounding plant and animal populations also take a toll from oil extraction, as it can lead to land fragmentation and overall disruption of food chains. Resulting in seed dispersal and disrupted animal migrations, making it difficult for species to survive and support genetic diversity. Influencing edge effects, mixing ecosystems, and leading to influxes of invasive species. Sound and light pollution have also been proven to disrupt species’ abilities to locate prey, find mates, and avoid predators.

As scholars Sarah Deer and Elizabeth Warner show, greenhouse gas emissions are one of the most prevalent causes of climate change, which disproportionately effects Indigenous communities by causing erosion, severe weather, declining populations of salmon and other sacred fish species, and negative health effects overall. Creating Environmental injustices for the Indigenous people who have inhabited the land for generations. Given that they have a strong relationship with the land, oil operations that take place within proximity to their communities cause them to experience poor environmental externalities firsthand and disproportionately affect their living conditions. As Indigenous peoples are the majority of individuals being affected, despite suffering from serious health effects and dealing with unwanted runoff from pipelines, they lack representation and attention from the government. Causing their hardships to go unheard, while oil is continuously drilled. Thus, the negative effects of extraction harm not only the land that is being extracted from, but the original inhabitants of that land.

Environmental History of the Great Plains Region

The North Dakota oil basin falls into the Great Plains region of the United States which covers the flatland east of the Rocky Mountains. The Bakken Formation is a large subsurface rock formation consisting of an upper and lower level about 145 ft thick and separated by a calcareous split stone. Made up of black organic-rich shale, mostly stemming from decayed planktonic algae. During the Cretaceous period, the area was an inland sea with large amounts of marine life. Once the sea dried up, it left land with flat terrain along with many deposits of decaying marine life that later became hydrocarbons. Allowing for the land to become rich and valuable in terms of agriculture and natural resource extraction.

== Economic effects ==
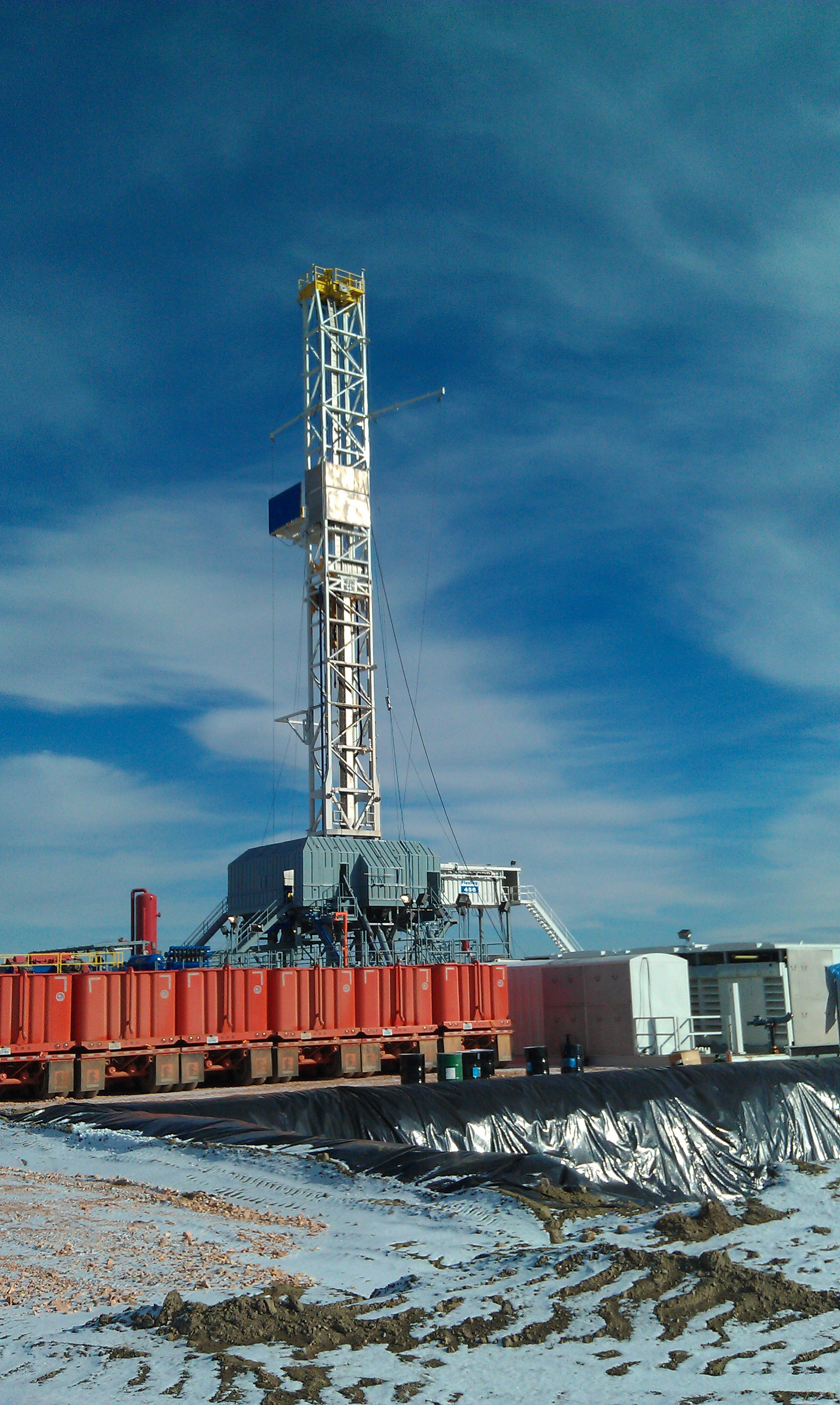
Drilling the Bakken formation in the Williston Basin.

From 2008 to at least 2014, the North Dakota oil boom resulted in enough jobs to provide North Dakota with the lowest unemployment rate in the United States despite the Great Recession. In December 2011, at the height of the oil boom, North Dakota's unemployment was only 3.5 percent, the lowest of any state in the US.

The boom gave North Dakota, a state with a 2013 population of about 725,000, a billion-dollar budget surplus. North Dakota had ranked 38th in per capita gross domestic product (GDP) in 2001, and rose steadily with the Bakken boom. It had a per capita GDP 29% above the national average by 2013.

By 2012, income from oil royalties was reportedly paying many local mineral owners $50,000 to $60,000 per month, and some more than $100,000 per month. Bruce Gjovig, head of the UND Center for Innovation Foundation in Grand Forks, estimated that the boom was creating 2,000 millionaires per year in North Dakota. By 2010, the average income in Mountrail County more than doubled to $52,027, putting the county into the top 100 richest counties in the United States.

The number of actively-drilling rigs in North Dakota peaked at 217 rigs in Spring 2012, with the rig count averaging 180-190 throughout 2013. Each of the rigs is estimated to create roughly 125 new full-time jobs. This meant a total growth of around 25,000 jobs, including an extra 10,000 jobs for workers who lay pipes to producing wells and produce processing plants. Some estimates predicted that North Dakota could have as many as 48,000 new wells, with drilling taking place over the next two to three decades.

The Bakken boom propelled North Dakota into the top ranks of oil-producing states. By 2007, North Dakota ranked 8th among the states in oil production. In 2008, the state overtook Wyoming and New Mexico; in 2009, it outproduced Louisiana and Oklahoma; in 2011 and 2012 it surpassed California and Alaska, respectively. By 2012, North Dakota was exceeded only by Texas in oil production.

By October 2020, total oil rig count in the state had fallen dramatically. According to the North Dakota Department of Mineral Resources, the total oil rig count in the state decreased from 58 active rigs on October 3, 2019, to only 11 active rigs on October 3, 2020, a reduction of over 80 percent.

=== Government revenue ===
The North Dakota state government receives 11.5 percent of the gross value of all oil produced through severance taxes. The boom gave the state of North Dakota a billion-dollar budget surplus in 2011.

In addition to severance taxes, the state of North Dakota owns extensive mineral rights, which means the state owns materials under land-surface, sold as real property, separate from the land above it. The federal government is also a major owner of mineral rights in the region, and it also leases the rights to companies in competitive bidding. Information on mineral ownership is complex, expensive, and difficult to access by the public. This allows the government to favor large corporations who can hire law and research firms to navigate mineral ownership information and can more easily win bidding processes, thereby preventing individuals from acquiring mineral rights.

In fiscal year 2010, the State Land Department reported that mineral income on its land earned $265 million for the North Dakota school trust fund, and that the trust fund had grown to $1.3 billion. In a January 2013 federal lease sale, the top bid was $19,500 per acre for a lease on one tract in North Dakota. Of the lease sale and royalties from the federal tracts, the federal government keeps 52 percent, and passes 48 percent on to the state of North Dakota.

== Infrastructure effects ==
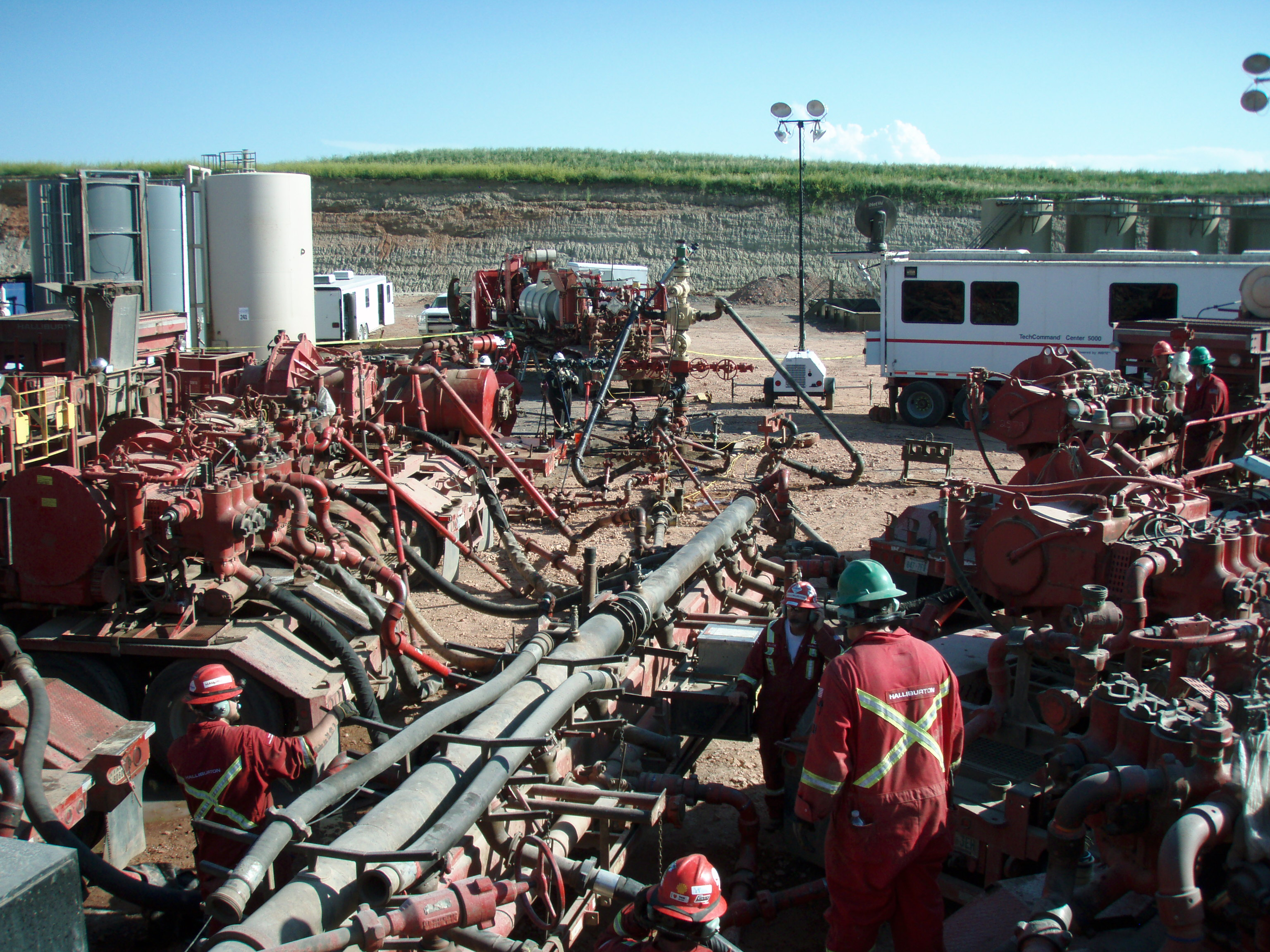
Bakken oil fields in work.

The industrialization and population boom put a strain on roads, water supplies, sewage systems, and government services in the Bakken Formation and Williston Basin area. For context, this area covers over half of the state. Some counties increased in population by almost double, from 20,000 to 40,000. The city of Williston ND has grown the most from the boom with 210% increase in population since 2010. The population increased in men and decreased in women, as the physically laborious jobs attracted some, while crime drove out others. Long term viability of a boom area generally will not last, as the services do not expand at the same rapid pace of population growth. Examples of services that were not maintained in North Dakota include school consolidations and size accommodations, lack of goods on demand, poor health care availability, loss of human capital, inadequate elderly care, and road development.

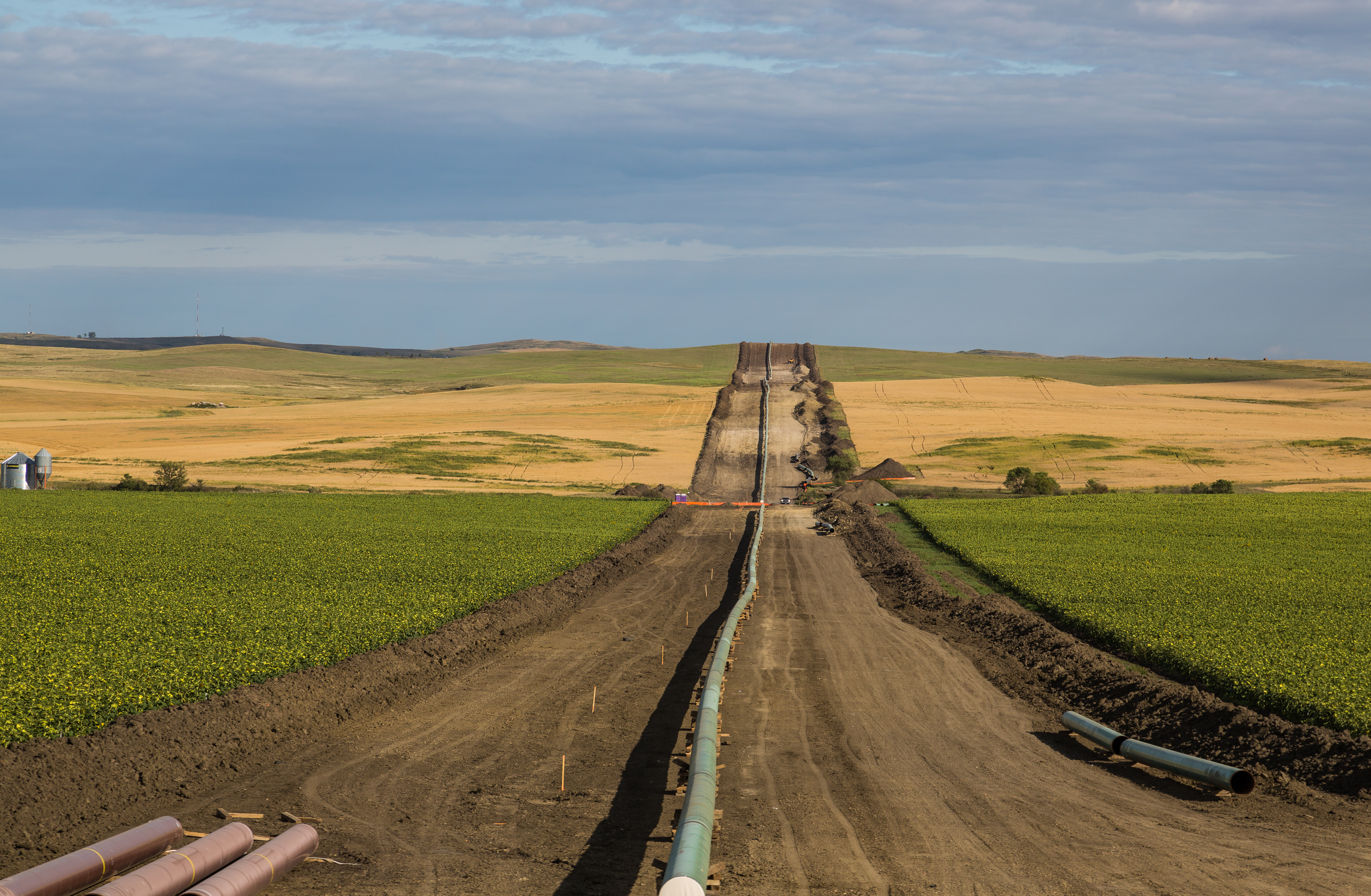
An oil pipeline running through lands precious to Tribal Nations including tribes such as the Standing Rock Sioux.

Oil rig count in the US

== Decline ==
The oil boom in North Dakota experienced a brief decline in 2014 after the Saudi Arabian oil industry increased its output and the price of crude oil fell from $108 to $40. The price returned just as the U.S. economy recovered from the Great Recession which resulted in difficulties recruiting workers back to the region.

== Temporary resurgence ==
By October 2020, total oil rig count in North Dakota had fallen. According to the North Dakota Department of Mineral Resources, the total oil rig count in the state had fallen from 58 active rigs on October 3, 2019, to only 11 active rigs on October 3, 2020, a reduction of over 80 percent. However, oil production hit an all time high of 1.5 million barrels per day in 2019. Demand fell temporarily due to the COVID-19 pandemic. In 2021 oil prices recovered to over $70 per barrel due to increased demand linked to the Covid-19 recovery and North Dakota remained the state with the second highest oil production after Texas until it was overtaken by New Mexico in May 2021.

As of February 2024, oil production has slowed, with plans to add one or two more drilling rigs in the area in 2024.

== See also ==
- Bakken Formation
- Blood & Oil, a fictional 2015 TV series that takes place in North Dakota
- Keystone Pipeline
- Marcellus natural gas trend
- The Overnighters, a documentary film about workers in the North Dakota oil boom
- Peak oil
