= Elm Coulee Oil Field =

Oil field in Montana, USA

Elm Coulee
- Location within Montana
- Country: United States
- Region: Montana
- Location: Richland County
- Coordinates: 48°2′33″N 104°27′58″W

Field history
- Discovery: 2000

Production
- Current production of oil: 53,000 barrels per day (~2.6×10^{6} t/a)
- Producing formations: Bakken formation

Elm Coulee Oil Field was discovered in the Williston Basin in Richland County, eastern Montana, in 2000. It produces oil from the Bakken formation and, as of 2007, was the "highest-producing onshore field found in the lower 48 states in the past 56 years." By 2007, the field had become one of the 20 largest oil fields in the United States.

Geologist Richard Findley was undaunted by the failure of "horizontal" Bakken play of the early 1990s. This early attempt to exploit the Bakken Formation using horizontal drilling failed because the wells were placed in the shale members of the Bakken. Findley found that the dolomitic middle Bakken member in Montana had oil shows and porosity in sample cuttings, as well as porosity on well logs. Also, the porous middle Bakken member could be mapped over a large area in Montana, which Findley called a "Sleeping Giant". The Bakken formation had long been known to produce small amounts of oil throughout much of the deeper Williston Basin. Although the volume of oil recovered was commonly small, rare wells would produce large, economic volumes from the Bakken. Two wells in the future Elm Coulee area had made significant production from the Bakken in vertical boreholes, which was somewhat unusual.

The area Findley mapped was too large for a small operator like Findley, so he submitted his concept to Lyco Energy of Dallas, Texas in 1996. Lyco took the project on, with Findley retaining a small ownership interest. Lyco began leasing in 1996, and then re-entered nine old vertical wells as a test, completing them with 100,000 lb fracs in the middle Bakken formation in 1996-7. The results were mixed, but confirmed that the Middle Bakken was saturated with producible oil, and would respond to a frac.

Although there were a handful of horizontal wells being fracced in the Barnett Shale of Texas at the time (1997-8), those activities were not yet released. So, with no data available for an analogy, Lyco's geologist (Michael Lewis) and engineers (Charles Wiley and Gary Dittmar) set out to design the initial test well. Because of the relatively high cost and large potential scope of the project, Bobby Lyle (president of Lyco) decided that it would be prudent to involve investors. So, the Lyco team sought funding from numerous financial institutions and a few independent oil companies. But, the project was viewed as too risky, since there was no analogy for the concept. Finally, Halliburton agreed with Lyco's assessment of the potential, including the potential boon for its stimulation business, and agreed to support Lyco's operations financially through its commercial services division.

Lyco drilled the first horizontal well in the field, the Burning Tree State #36-10 in late 1999, as the oil price moved upwards toward $20 per barrel. Although designed as a 3,000 foot lateral, the well was terminated early due to hole stability issues. Production casing was run to bottom and cemented, then perforated in three intervals over the roughly 1,000 foot lateral; at the toe, the middle and the heel. The well flowed oil immediately, at 196 barrels per day, and continued flowing for several months. Finally, the well was fracced, with a substantial increase in production. Lyco then began a continuous drilling program, progressing to 3 rigs and beyond. Headington, another oil company in the area that happened to own leases, began a drilling program also, followed by Continental and others who rushed in to take lease positions on this new, hot play.

At Elm Coulee, the Middle Bakken is a dolomite sandwiched between the Upper and Lower Shales. The shales are very rich in organic material, and the oil generated from them expanded from the shales upon reaching thermal maturity, migrating into this Middle Bakken zone. The field is exploited via horizontal drilling technology by perforating the productive rocks parallel to the beds, rather than through a vertical well perpendicular to the relatively thin Bakken formation. At Elm Coulee Field, the Bakken is only about 45 feet (15 m) thick and lies at depths of 8,500 to 10,500 feet (2,600–3,200 m), but horizontal wells penetrate 3,000 to 10,000 feet (900–3,000 m) of the reservoir rock, a porous dolomite of Devonian age that probably originated as a large carbonate bank on the western flank of the basin. The field is a stratigraphic trap.

Oil production from Montana and Elm Coulee Oil Field through 2005

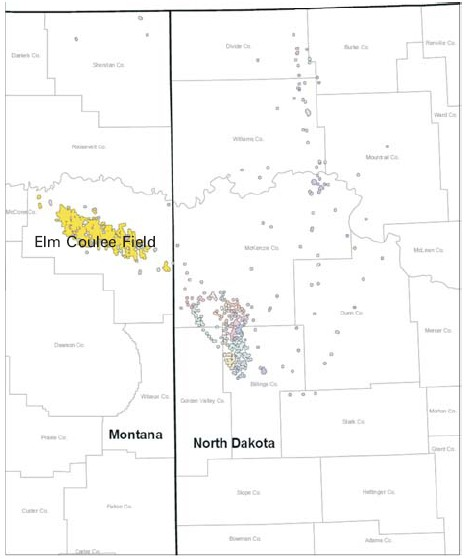
Map of Williston Basin oil fields with reservoirs in Bakken Formation

In 2006, Elm Coulee was producing about 53,000 barrels (8,400 m^{3}) of oil per day from more than 350 wells. Ultimate production is expected to exceed 270 million barrels (43,000,000 m^{3}), with some estimates as high as 500 million barrels (79,000,000 m^{3}). Production at Elm Coulee has more than doubled the oil output of the state of Montana, from around 40,000 barrels per day (6,400 m^{3}/d) in 2000 to almost 100,000 barrels per day (16,000 m^{3}/d) in 2006. However, Montana production fell again starting in 2007, down to some 70,000 barrels per day (11,000 m^{3}/d) in mid-2009.
