= Richland County, Montana =

County in Montana, United States

- County
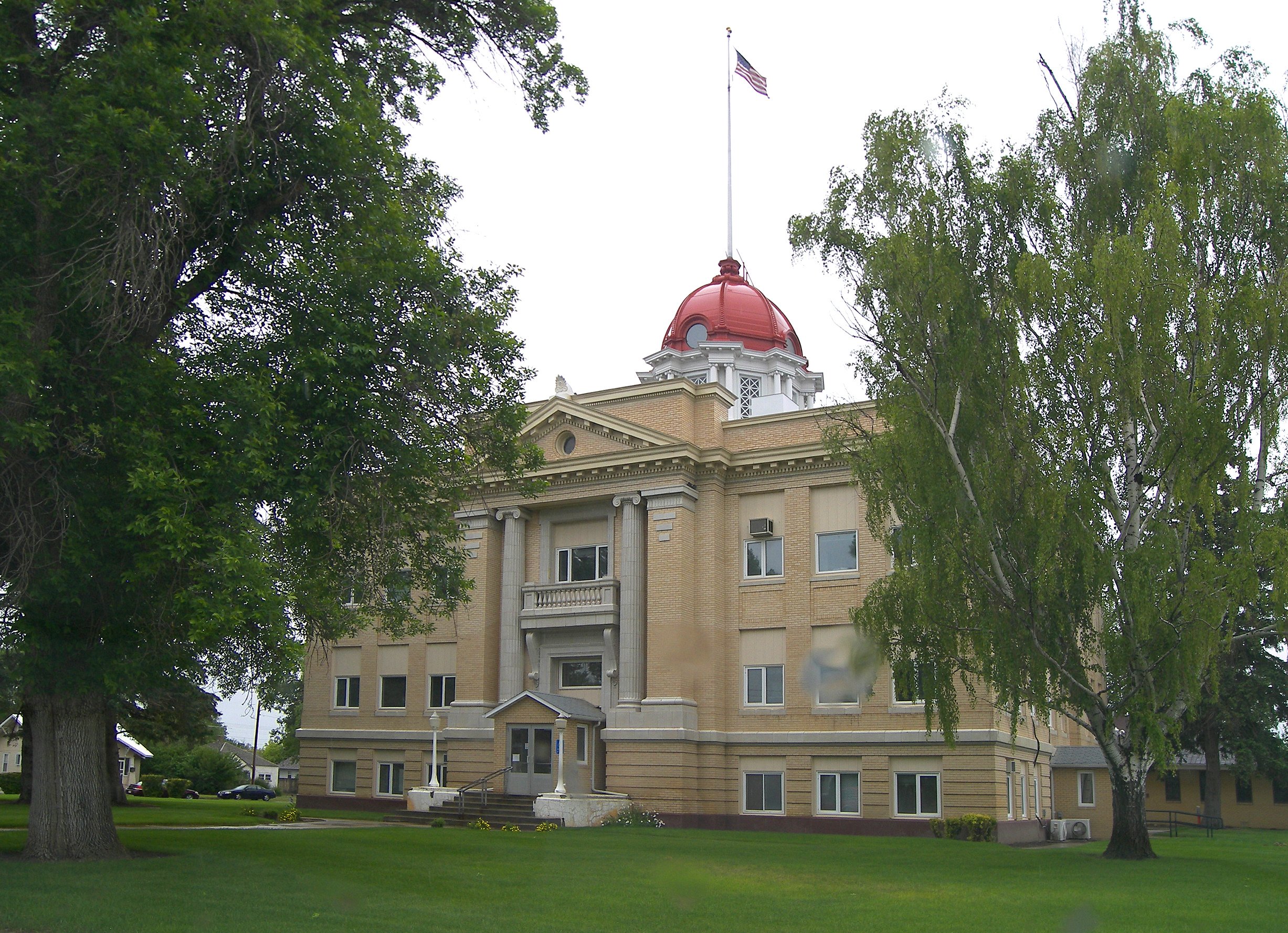
- Richland County Courthouse in Sidney

- Location within the U.S. state of Montana
- Coordinates: 47°47′N 104°34′W
- Country: United States
- State: Montana
- Founded: May 27, 1914
- Seat: Sidney
- Largest city: Sidney

Area
  - Total: 2,103 sq mi (5,450 km^{2})
  - Land: 2,084 sq mi (5,400 km^{2})
  - Water: 19 sq mi (49 km^{2}) 0.9%

Population (2020)
  - Total: 11,491
  - Estimate (2025): 11,377 ▼
  - Density: 5.514/sq mi (2.129/km^{2})
- Time zone: UTC−7 (Mountain)
  - Summer (DST): UTC−6 (MDT)
- Congressional district: 2nd
- Website: www.richland.org
- Montana county number 27

Richland County is a county in the U.S. state of Montana. As of the 2020 census, the population was 11,491. Its county seat is Sidney.

Richland County was created by the Montana Legislature in 1914 from part of Dawson County. An early proposed name for the county was Gate, but Richland was decided upon instead as a way to entice new settlers.

== Geography ==
According to the United States Census Bureau, the county has a total area of 2,103 square miles (5,450 km^{2}), of which 2,084 square miles (5,400 km^{2}) is land and 19 square miles (49 km^{2}) (0.9%) is water.

=== Major highways ===
- Montana Highway 16
- Montana Highway 23
- Montana Highway 200

=== Adjacent counties ===
- Roosevelt County – north
- Williams County, North Dakota – northeast
- McKenzie County, North Dakota – east
- Wibaux County - south
- Dawson County – southwest
- McCone County - west

== Demographics ==
Historical population
| Census | Pop. | Note | %± |
|---|---|---|---|
| 1920 | 8,989 | | — |
| 1930 | 9,633 | | 7.2% |
| 1940 | 10,209 | | 6.0% |
| 1950 | 10,366 | | 1.5% |
| 1960 | 10,504 | | 1.3% |
| 1970 | 9,837 | | −6.3% |
| 1980 | 12,243 | | 24.5% |
| 1990 | 10,716 | | −12.5% |
| 2000 | 9,667 | | −9.8% |
| 2010 | 9,746 | | 0.8% |
| 2020 | 11,491 | | 17.9% |
| 2025 (est.) | 11,377 | ▼ | −1.0% |
U.S. Decennial Census; 1790–1960, 1900–1990, 1990–2000, 2010–2020

=== 2020 census ===
As of the 2020 census, the county had a population of 11,491. Of the residents, 24.5% were under the age of 18 and 15.6% were 65 years of age or older; the median age was 38.4 years. For every 100 females there were 105.3 males, and for every 100 females age 18 and over there were 106.8 males. 56.8% of residents lived in urban areas and 43.2% lived in rural areas.

The racial makeup of the county was 88.0% White, 0.5% Black or African American, 1.6% American Indian and Alaska Native, 1.1% Asian, 1.8% from some other race, and 7.0% from two or more races. Hispanic or Latino residents of any race comprised 5.3% of the population.

There were 4,827 households in the county, of which 30.0% had children under the age of 18 living with them and 20.8% had a female householder with no spouse or partner present. About 31.0% of all households were made up of individuals and 11.6% had someone living alone who was 65 years of age or older.

There were 5,566 housing units, of which 13.3% were vacant. Among occupied housing units, 65.1% were owner-occupied and 34.9% were renter-occupied. The homeowner vacancy rate was 2.0% and the rental vacancy rate was 11.3%.

=== 2010 census ===
As of the 2010 census, there were 9,746 people, 4,167 households, and 2,698 families in the county. The population density was 4.7 inhabitants per square mile (1.8/km^{2}). There were 4,550 housing units at an average density of 2.2 per square mile (0.85/km^{2}). The racial makeup of the county was 95.0% white, 1.7% American Indian, 0.2% Asian, 0.1% black or African American, 0.8% from other races, and 2.1% from two or more races. Those of Hispanic or Latino origin made up 3.0% of the population. In terms of ancestry, 37.8% were German, 23.1% were Norwegian, 13.0% were Irish, 8.7% were American, and 6.5% were English.

Of the 4,167 households, 28.9% had children under the age of 18 living with them, 51.9% were married couples living together, 7.6% had a female householder with no husband present, 35.3% were non-families, and 29.8% of all households were made up of individuals. The average household size was 2.33 and the average family size was 2.88. The median age was 41.3 years.

The median income for a household in the county was $52,516 and the median income for a family was $60,236. Males had a median income of $44,788 versus $23,135 for females. The per capita income for the county was $26,888. About 10.2% of families and 13.5% of the population were below the poverty line, including 16.6% of those under age 18 and 14.4% of those age 65 or over.

== Economy ==
Although most of the surface land of the county is devoted to ranching, oil exploration and production became important elements of the county's economy beginning with the discovery in 2000 of Elm Coulee Oil Field, part of the Bakken formation.

== Politics ==
Richland County voters have been reliably Republican, opting only one time for the Democratic Party candidate in national elections since 1948 (as of 2020).

United States presidential election results for Richland County, Montana
| Year | Republican | | Democratic | | Third party(ies) | |
| Year | No. | % | No. | % | No. | % |
|---|---|---|---|---|---|---|
| 1916 | 1,223 | 36.51% | 1,947 | 58.12% | 180 | 5.37% |
| 1920 | 1,759 | 65.46% | 744 | 27.69% | 184 | 6.85% |
| 1924 | 926 | 49.95% | 238 | 12.84% | 690 | 37.22% |
| 1928 | 1,648 | 63.53% | 917 | 35.35% | 29 | 1.12% |
| 1932 | 1,216 | 39.02% | 1,768 | 56.74% | 132 | 4.24% |
| 1936 | 1,066 | 28.99% | 2,516 | 68.43% | 95 | 2.58% |
| 1940 | 1,497 | 41.07% | 2,095 | 57.48% | 53 | 1.45% |
| 1944 | 1,347 | 42.61% | 1,777 | 56.22% | 37 | 1.17% |
| 1948 | 1,332 | 43.11% | 1,673 | 54.14% | 85 | 2.75% |
| 1952 | 2,506 | 67.28% | 1,196 | 32.11% | 23 | 0.62% |
| 1956 | 2,366 | 55.67% | 1,884 | 44.33% | 0 | 0.00% |
| 1960 | 2,395 | 56.10% | 1,863 | 43.64% | 11 | 0.26% |
| 1964 | 1,784 | 43.19% | 2,320 | 56.16% | 27 | 0.65% |
| 1968 | 2,381 | 59.29% | 1,399 | 34.84% | 236 | 5.88% |
| 1972 | 2,645 | 61.51% | 1,438 | 33.44% | 217 | 5.05% |
| 1976 | 2,189 | 51.35% | 1,961 | 46.00% | 113 | 2.65% |
| 1980 | 3,348 | 66.45% | 1,252 | 24.85% | 438 | 8.69% |
| 1984 | 3,847 | 72.85% | 1,382 | 26.17% | 52 | 0.98% |
| 1988 | 2,628 | 57.81% | 1,824 | 40.12% | 94 | 2.07% |
| 1992 | 1,760 | 37.07% | 1,440 | 30.33% | 1,548 | 32.60% |
| 1996 | 2,021 | 44.24% | 1,614 | 35.33% | 933 | 20.42% |
| 2000 | 2,858 | 70.87% | 1,018 | 25.24% | 157 | 3.89% |
| 2004 | 3,110 | 72.19% | 1,120 | 26.00% | 78 | 1.81% |
| 2008 | 3,184 | 70.50% | 1,203 | 26.64% | 129 | 2.86% |
| 2012 | 3,510 | 75.52% | 1,002 | 21.56% | 136 | 2.93% |
| 2016 | 3,908 | 80.23% | 671 | 13.78% | 292 | 5.99% |
| 2020 | 4,800 | 82.79% | 875 | 15.09% | 123 | 2.12% |
| 2024 | 4,387 | 82.63% | 778 | 14.65% | 144 | 2.71% |

== Communities ==
=== City ===
- Sidney (county seat)

=== Town ===
- Fairview

=== Census-designated places ===
- Crane
- Fox Lake
- Savage

=== Other unincorporated places ===
- Andes
- Enid
- Lambert
- Ludington
- Girard
- Nohly
- Ridgelawn
- Sioux Pass

== See also ==
- List of lakes in Richland County, Montana
- List of mountains in Richland County, Montana
- National Register of Historic Places listings in Richland County MT
