= Ridgeback Resources =

Canadian oil exploration and production company

Ridgeback Resources Inc.
- Company type: Private company
- Industry: Petroleum and Natural Gas Exploration, Development and Production
- Headquarters: Calgary, Alberta, Canada
- Key people: J. Paul Charron, Executive Chairman and CEO
- Products: crude oil, natural gas
- Website: www.ridgeback.com

Ridgeback Resources Inc. is a Calgary, Alberta-based private oil exploration and production company focused on light oil in the Bakken and Cardium resource plays, in the Western Canadian Sedimentary Basin.

On December 29, 2016, Lightstream Resources Ltd. announced the closing of its asset sale to Ridgeback Resources Inc.

As of March 1st, 2023, Ridgeback Resources Inc. is now Saturn Oil and Gas Inc.

== Acquisition of Lightstream ==
Following the announcement, all of Lightstream's directors resigned. Former president and CEO of Lightstream, John D. Wright, was appointed to Ridgeback's board of directors.
