= Oil rig =

Apparatus constructed for oil drilling

An oil rig is any kind of apparatus constructed for oil drilling.

Kinds of oil rig include:

- Drilling rig, an apparatus for on-land oil drilling
- Drillship, a floating apparatus for offshore oil drilling
- Oil platform, an apparatus for offshore oil drilling
- Oil well, a boring from which oil is extracted
