= American bison hunting =

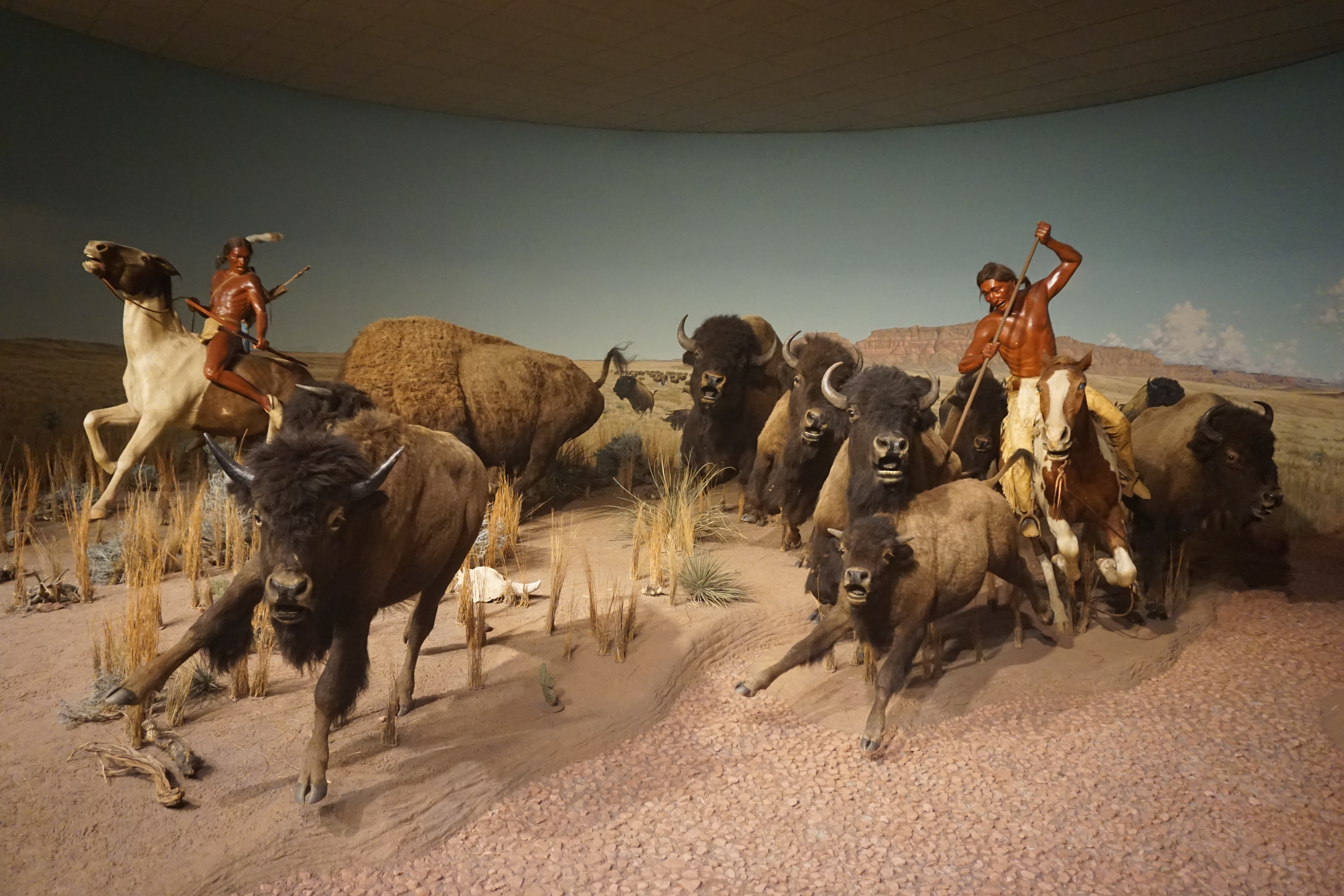
The Crow Indian Buffalo Hunt diorama at the Milwaukee Public Museum

A group of images by Eadweard Muybridge, set to motion to illustrate the animal's movement

Hunting of the American bison, also commonly known as the American buffalo, was an activity fundamental to the economy and society of the Plains Indians peoples who inhabited the vast grasslands on the Interior Plains of North America, before the animal's near-extinction in the late 19th century following United States expansion into the West. Bison hunting was an important spiritual practice and source of material for these groups, especially after the European introduction of the horse in the 16th through 19th centuries enabled new hunting techniques. The species' dramatic decline was the result of habitat loss due to the expansion of ranching and farming in western North America, industrial-scale hunting practiced by settler hunters, increasing Indigenous hunting pressure due to settler demand for bison hides and meat, and cases of a deliberate policy by settler governments to destroy the food source of the Indigenous peoples.

== Prehistoric and native hunting ==
Long before humans arrived in the Americas, bison hunting had been practiced in Eurasia by archaic humans, like Neanderthals. In North America, bison hunting has been practiced since shortly after the first arrival of humans in the region. At Jake Bluff in northern Oklahoma, Clovis points are associated with numerous butchered bones of the extinct bison species Bison antiquus, which represented a bison herd of at least 22 individuals. At the time of deposition, which dates to around 12,838 calibrated years Before Present (10,888 BC), the site was a steep-sided arroyo (dry watercourse) that formed a dead-end. This suggests that Clovis hunters trapped the bison herd within the arroyo before killing them, showing continuity with the bison hunting tactics of the later Folsom tradition.

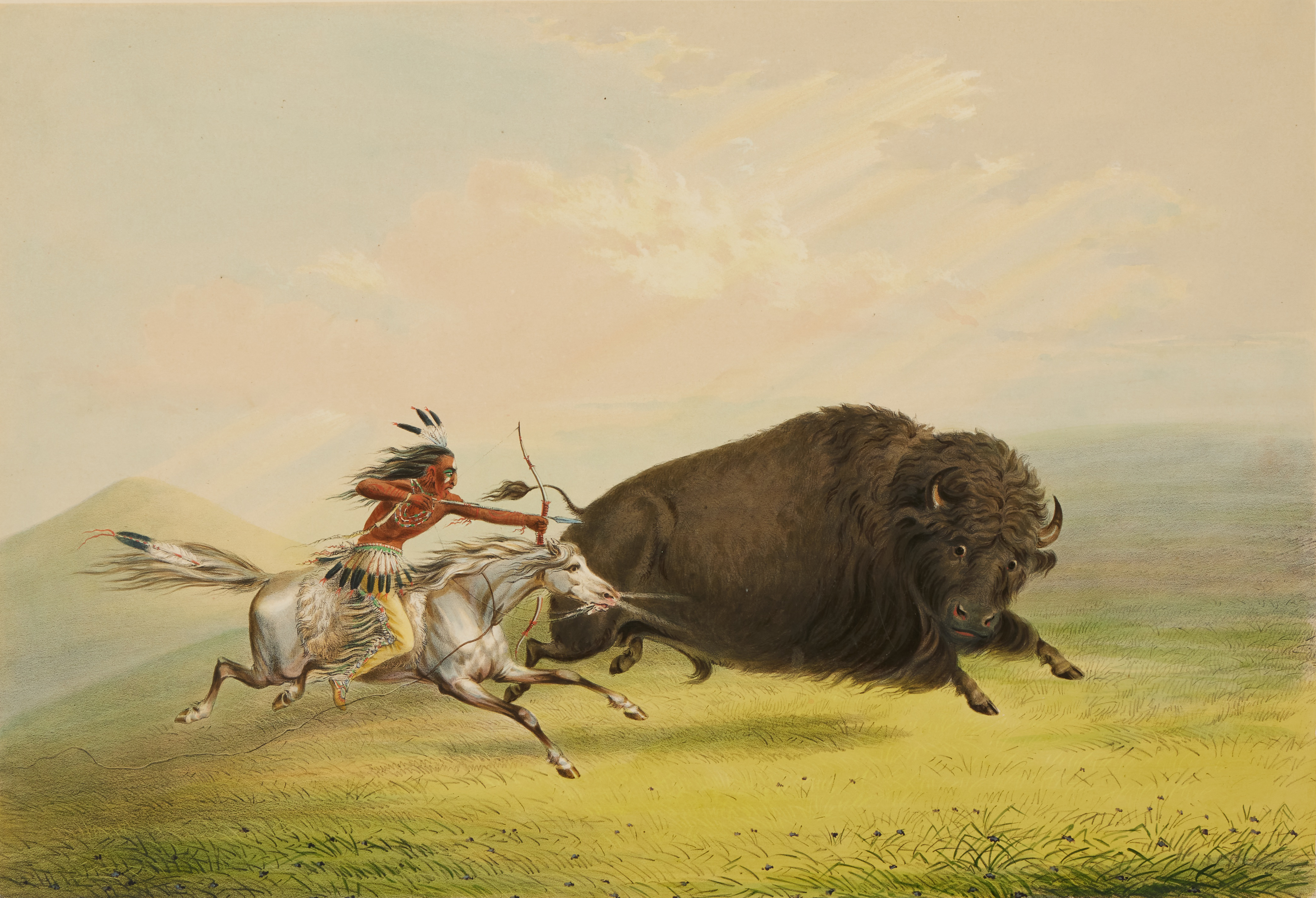
A bison hunt depicted by George Catlin

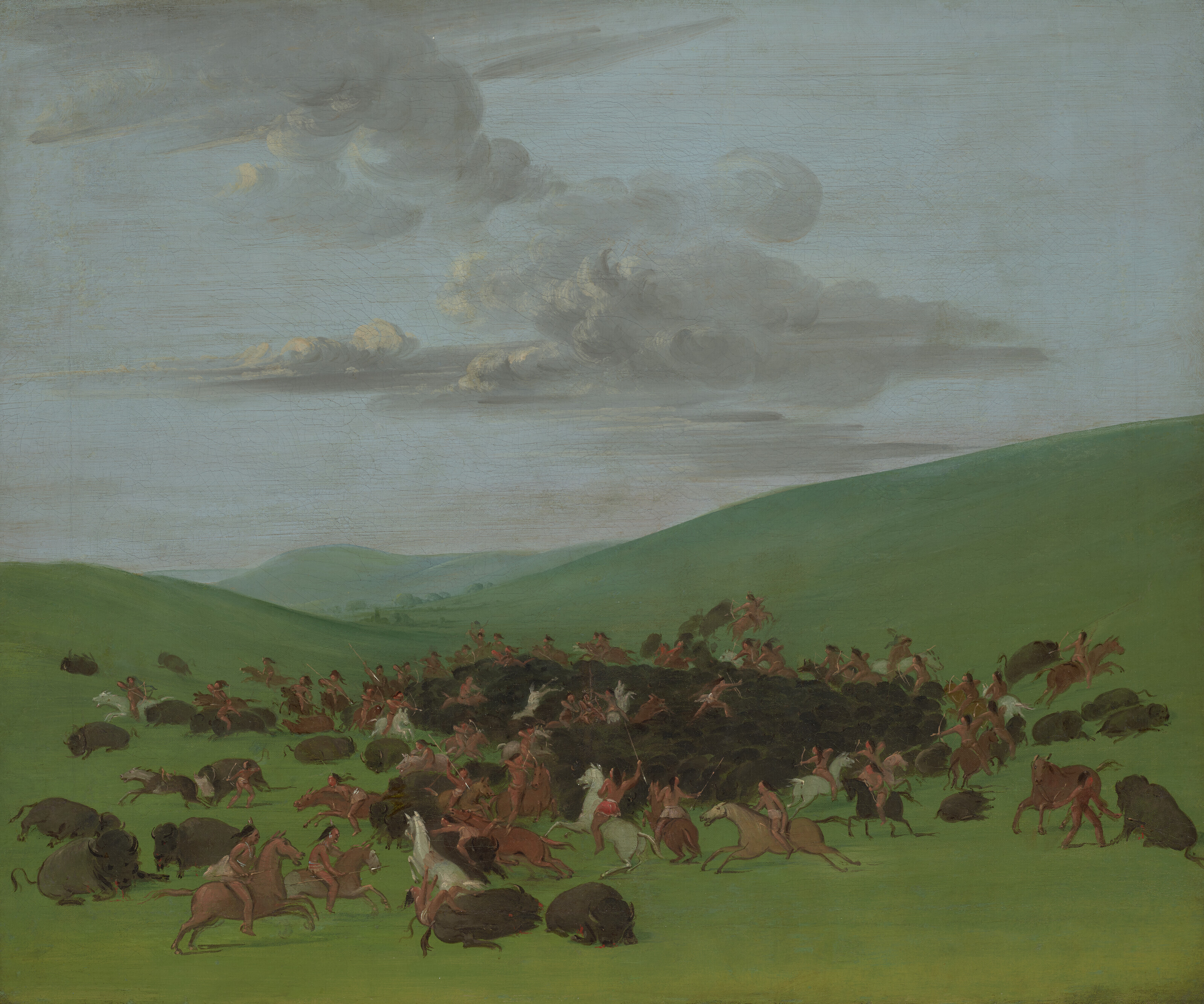
Hidatsa hunting bison, George Catlin, c. 1832

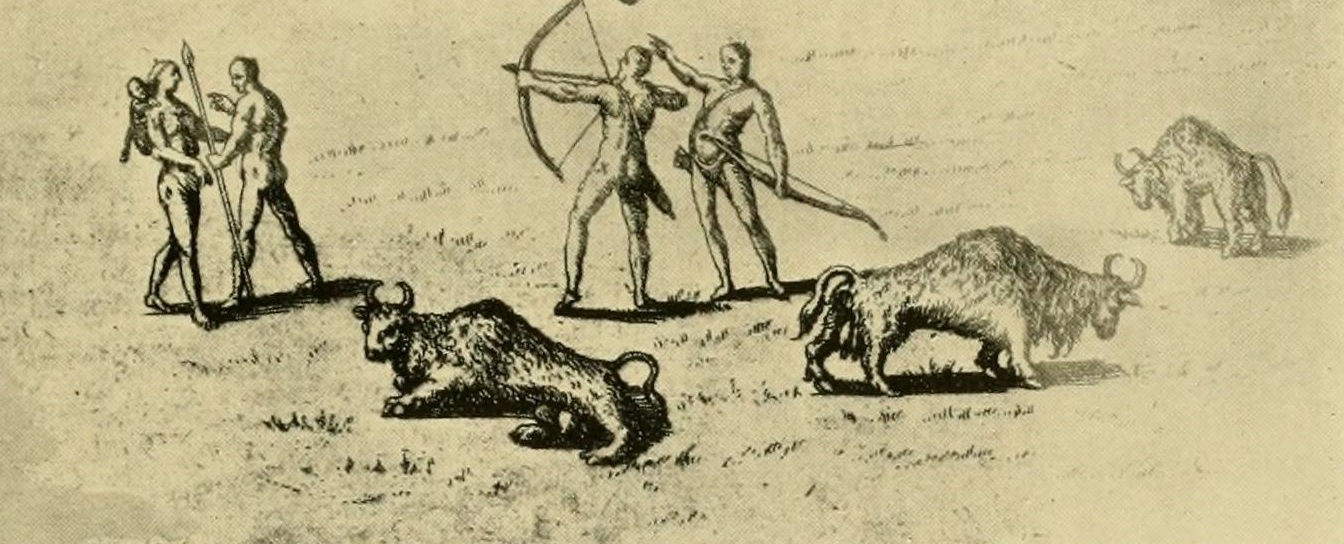
Bison and Indians of De Bry, 1595. Pedro Castaneda, a soldier with Coronado on the Southern Plains in 1542, compared the bison with "fish in the sea".

=== Native American plains bison hunting ===
==== Ecology, spread, interaction with humans ====
The modern American bison is split into two subspecies, the wood bison in the boreal forests of what is now Canada, and the plains bison on the prairies extending from Canada to Mexico. The plains subspecies became the dominant animal of the prairies of North America, where bison were a keystone species, whose grazing and trampling pressure was a force that shaped the ecology of the Great Plains as strongly as periodic prairie fires and which were central to the survival of many Indigenous peoples of the Great Plains. To the corn-growing village people, it was a valued second food source. However, there is now some controversy over their interaction. Charles C. Mann wrote in 1491: New Revelations of the Americas Before Columbus, pages 367 ff, "Hernando De Soto's expedition staggered through the Southeast for four years in the early 16th century and saw hordes of people but apparently didn't see a single bison." Mann discussed the evidence that Native Americans not only created (by selective use of fire) the large grasslands that provided the bison's ideal habitat but also kept the bison population regulated. In this theory, it was only when the original human population was devastated by wave after wave of epidemics (from diseases of Europeans) after the 16th century that the bison herds propagated wildly. In such a view, the seas of bison herds that stretched to the horizon were a symptom of an ecology out of balance, only rendered possible by decades of heavier-than-average rainfall. Other evidence of the arrival circa 1550–1600 in the savannas of the eastern seaboard includes the lack of places that southeast natives named after buffalo. Bison were the most numerous single species of large wild mammal on Earth.

==== Religious rituals ====
Religion plays a big role in Native American bison hunting. Plains tribes generally believe that successful hunts require certain rituals. The Omaha tribe had to approach a herd in four legs. At each stop, the chiefs and the leader of the hunt would sit down and smoke and offer prayers for success. The Pawnee performed the purifying Big Washing Ceremony before each tribal summer hunt to avoid scaring the bison.

To Plains tribes, the buffalo is one of the most sacred animals, and they feel obligated to treat them with respect. When they are about to kill a buffalo, they will offer it a prayer. Failures in the hunt could have been attributed to poorly performed rituals.

==== Trapping ====
Before the introduction of horses, bison were herded into large chutes made of rocks and willow branches (drive lines) and trapped in a corral called a buffalo pound, and then slaughtered or stampeded over cliffs, called buffalo jumps. Both pound and jump archaeological sites are found in several places in the U.S. and Canada.

Buffalo jumps

In the case of a jump, large groups of people would herd the bison for several miles, forcing them into a stampede that drove the herd over a cliff.

The earliest evidence for buffalo jumps dates to around 1400.

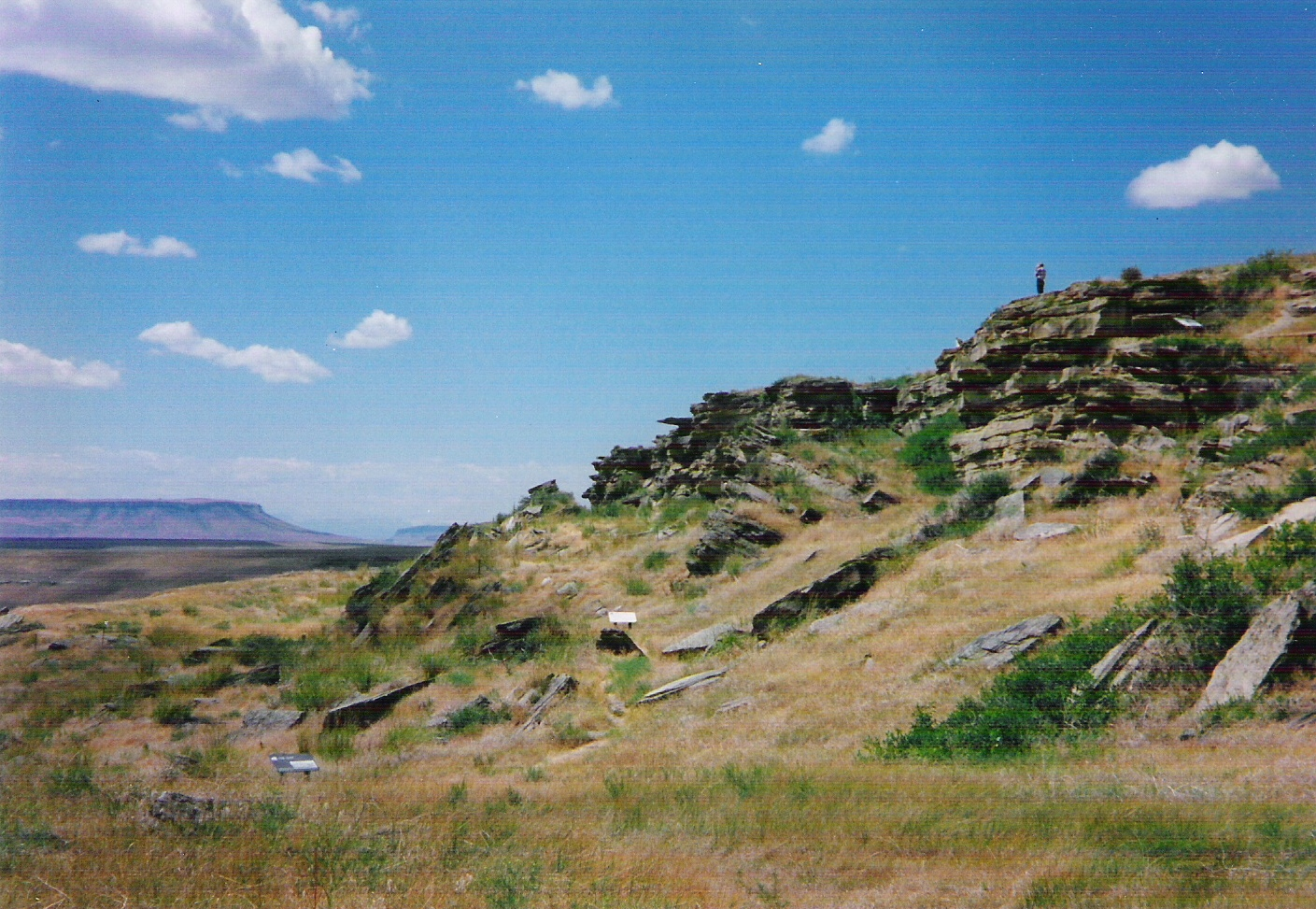
Ulm Pishkun. Buffalo Jump, SW of Great Falls, Montana. The Blackfoot drove bison over cliffs in the fall to secure the winter supply. Animals not killed in the fall were trapped and killed in a corral at the foot of the cliffs. The Blackfoot used pishkuns as late as the 1850s.

Working on foot, a few groups of Native Americans at times used fires to channel an entire herd of buffalo over a cliff, sometimes killing far more than they could use.

A Crow historian has related some ways to get bison. With the help of songs, hazers, drive lines of stones (cf. desert kites), and a medicine man pointing down the line with a pair of hindquarters in his hands, the Crows drove many bison over a cliff. A successful drive could give 700 animals.

Driving herds into enclosures

In the dog days, the women of a Blackfoot camp made a curved fence of travois tied together, front end up. Runners drove the game towards the enclosure, where hunters waited with lances, as well as bows and arrows.

People surrounding herds

Henry Kelsey described a hunt on the northern plains in 1691. First, the tribe surrounded a herd. Then they would "gather themselves into a smaller Compass Keeping ye Beast still in ye middle". The hunters killed as many as they could before the animals broke through the human ring.

Exhausting single bison

Russel Means states that bison were killed by using a method that coyotes implemented. Coyotes will sometimes cut one bison off from the herd and chase it in a circle until the animal collapses or gives up due to exhaustion.

Driving bison on ice

During winter, Chief One Heart's camp would maneuver the game out on slick ice, where it was easier to kill with hunting weapons.

Driving bison under ice

The Hidatsa near the Missouri River confined the buffalo on the weakest ice at the end of winter. When it cracked, the current swept the animals down under thicker ice. The people hauled the drowned animals ashore when they emerged downstream. Although not hunted in a strict sense, the nearby Mandan secured bison, and drowned by chance, when the ice broke. A trader observed the young men "in the drift ice leap from piece to piece, often falling between, plunging under, darting up elsewhere and securing themselves upon very slippery flakes" before they brought the carcasses to land.

==== Butchering methods and yield ====
The Olsen–Chubbuck archaeological site in Colorado, where buffalo herds were driven over a cliff, reveals some techniques, which may or may not have been widely used. The method involves skinning down the back to get at the tender meat just beneath the surface, the area known as the "hatched area". After the removal of the hatched area, the front legs are cut off as well as the shoulder blades. Doing so exposes the hump meat (in the Wood Bison), as well as the meat of the ribs and the Bison's inner organs. After everything was exposed, the spine was then severed and the pelvis and hind legs were removed. Finally, the neck and head were removed as one. This allowed for the tough meat to be dried and made into pemmican.

Castaneda saw Indigenous women butchering bison with a flint fixed on a short stick. He admired how quickly they completed the task. Blood to drink was filled in emptied guts, which were carried around the neck.

Each animal produces from 200 to 400 lb (91 to 181 kg) of meat.

==== Horse introduction and changing hunting dynamic ====
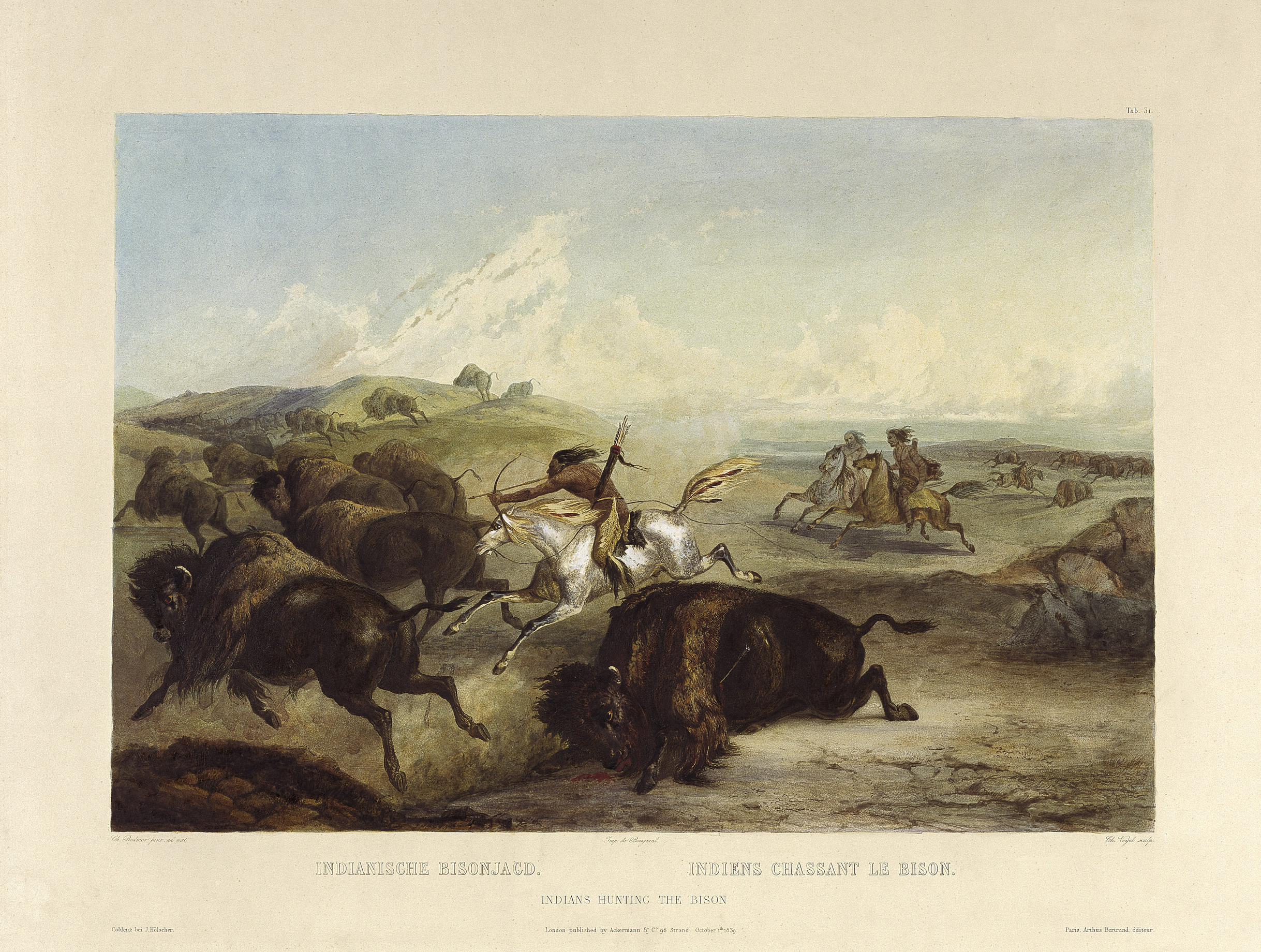
Illustration of Indians hunting the bison by Karl Bodmer

Horses taken from the Spanish were well-established in the nomadic hunting cultures by the early 1700s, and Indigenous groups once living east of the Great Plains moved west to hunt the larger bison population. Intertribal warfare forced the Cheyenne to give up their cornfields at Biesterfeldt village and eventually cross west of the Missouri and become the well-known horseback buffalo hunters. In addition to using bison for themselves, these Indigenous groups also traded meat and robes to village-based tribes.

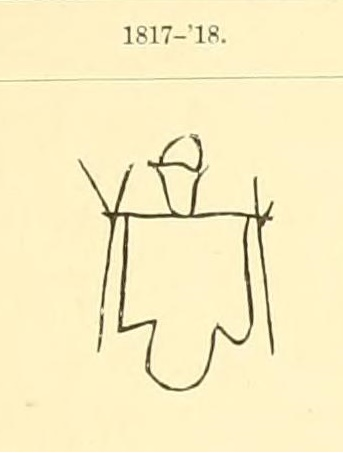
Lakota Winter Count of American Horse, 1817–1818. "The Oglalas had an abundance of buffalo meat and shared it with the Brulés, who were short of food". A bison skin on a frame designates plenty of meat.

A good horseman could easily lance or shoot enough bison to keep his tribe and family fed, as long as a herd was nearby. The bison provided meat, leather, and sinew for bows.

A fast-hunting horse would usually be spared and first mounted near the bison. The hunter rode on a pack horse until then. Hunters with few horses ran beside the mount to the hunting grounds. Accidents, sometimes fatal, happened from time to time to both rider and horse.

To avoid disputes, each hunter used arrows marked in a personal way. Lakota hunter Bear Face recognized his arrows by one of three "arrow wings" made of a pelican feather. Castaneda wrote how it was possible to shoot an arrow right through a buffalo. The Pawnees had contests as to how many bison it was possible to kill with just one bowshot. The best result was three. An arrow stuck in the animal was preferred as the most lethal. It would inflict more damage with each jump and move. A non-indigenous traveler credited the hunters with cutting up a bison and packing the meat on a horse in less than 15 minutes.

When the bison stayed away and made hunting impossible, famine became a reality. The hard experience of starvation found its way into stories and myths. A folk tale of the Kiowa begins "Famine once struck the Kiowa People ..." "The people were without food and no game could be found ..." makes an Omaha myth certain. A fur trader noted how some Sioux were in want of meat at one time in 1804. Starving Yanktonais passed by Fort Clark in 1836.

== Diminishing herds and the effects on tribes ==
Already Castaneda noted the typical relations of two different plains people relying heavily on the same food source: "They ... are enemies of each other." The bison hunting resulted in the loss of land for many tribal nations. Indirectly, it often disturbed the rhythm of tribal life, caused economic losses and hardship, and damaged tribal autonomy. As long as bison hunting went on, intertribal warfare was omnipresent.

=== Loss of land and disputes over the hunting grounds ===
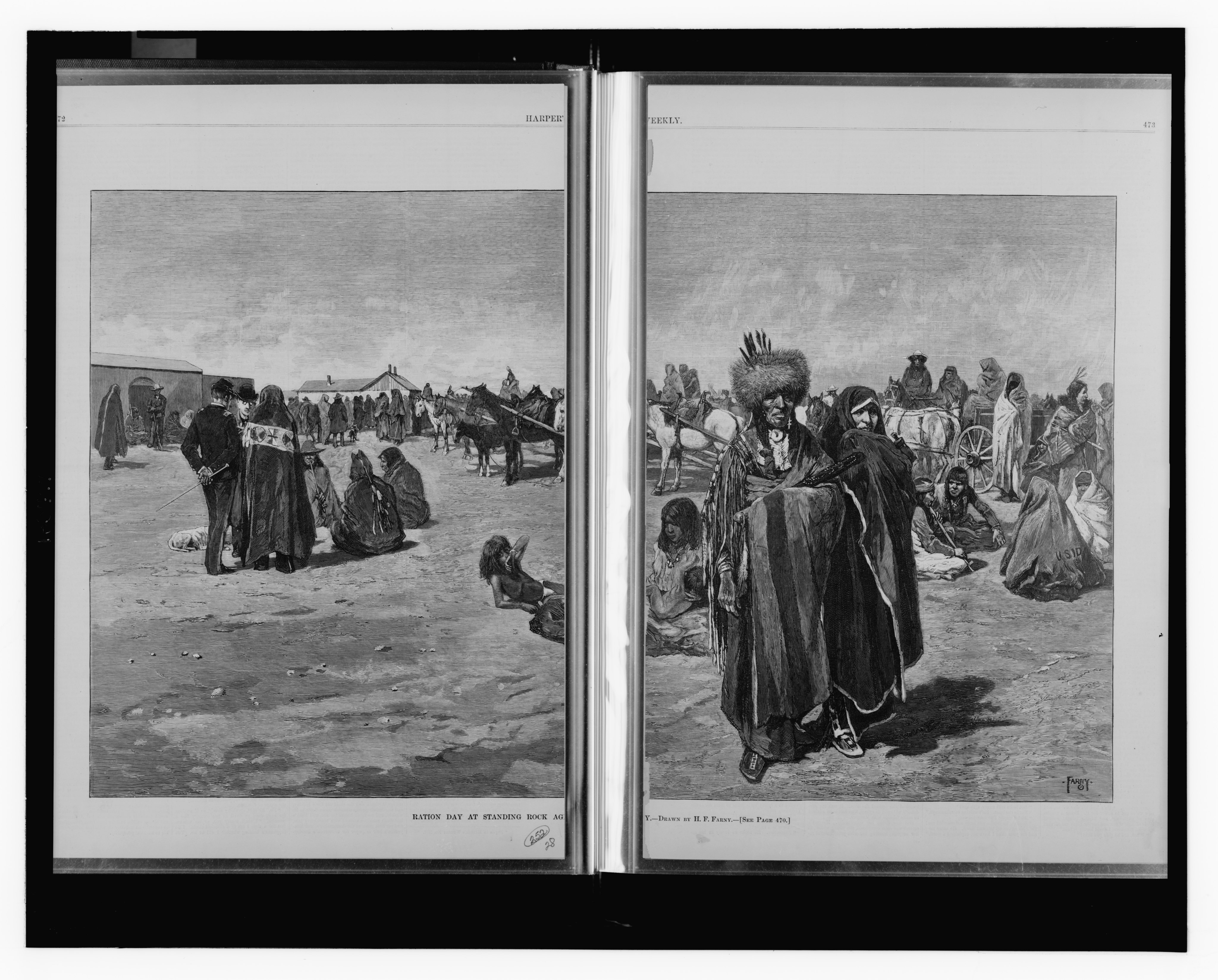
Ration Day at the Standing Rock Agency, 1883. The scarcity of buffalo led Plains Indians to become dependent on US government rations as the source of food.

Tribes forced away from the game-rich areas had to try their luck on the edges of the best buffalo habitats. Small tribes found it hard to do even that. Due to attacks in the 1850s and 1860s, the villages of Upper Missouri "hardly dared go into the plains to hunt buffalo". The Sioux would stay near Arikara villages "and keep the bison away, so they could sell meat and hides to the Arikaras".

The Kiowas have an early history in parts of present-day Montana and South Dakota. Here they fought the Cheyenne, "who challenged their right to hunt buffalo". Later, the Kiowas headed for the south together with the Comanche, when "the Lakota (Teton Sioux) drove them from the Black Hills territory". In present-day Montana, the better-armed Blackfoot pushed the Kutenai, Flathead, and Shoshone off the plains. At the start of the 19th century, they claimed the buffalo ranges entirely to the Rocky Mountains and fought all conceived as intruders. The less numerical tribe peoples west of the continental divide did not accept this. Their ancestors had hunted on the Great Plains and they would continue the tradition at all cost. "When we go to hunt Bison, we also prepare for war with the Peeagans [Piegan Blackfeet] and their allies", revealed a Flathead chief. A Kutenai gave this description of tribal hunts during buffalo days, "Across the mountains they went out on the prairie, but they were afraid of the Piegans."

In 1866, the Pend d'Oreilles crossed the Rocky Mountains from the west, just to be attacked by tribes as they entered the plains. They lost 21 people. The beaten hunting party returned in a "horrible condition" and "all nearly famished". Often, the attackers tried to capture dried meat, equipment, and horses during a fight. The lack of horses owing to raids reduced the chances of securing an ample amount of meat on the hunts. In 1860, the Ponca lost 100 horses, while the Mandan and Hidatsa saw the enemy disappear with 175 horses in a single raid in 1861.

Conflicts between the bison-hunting tribes ranged from raids to massacres. Camps were left without leaders. In the course of a battle, tipis and hides could be cut to pieces and tipi poles broken. Organized bison hunts and camp moves were stopped by the enemy, and villages had to flee their homes.

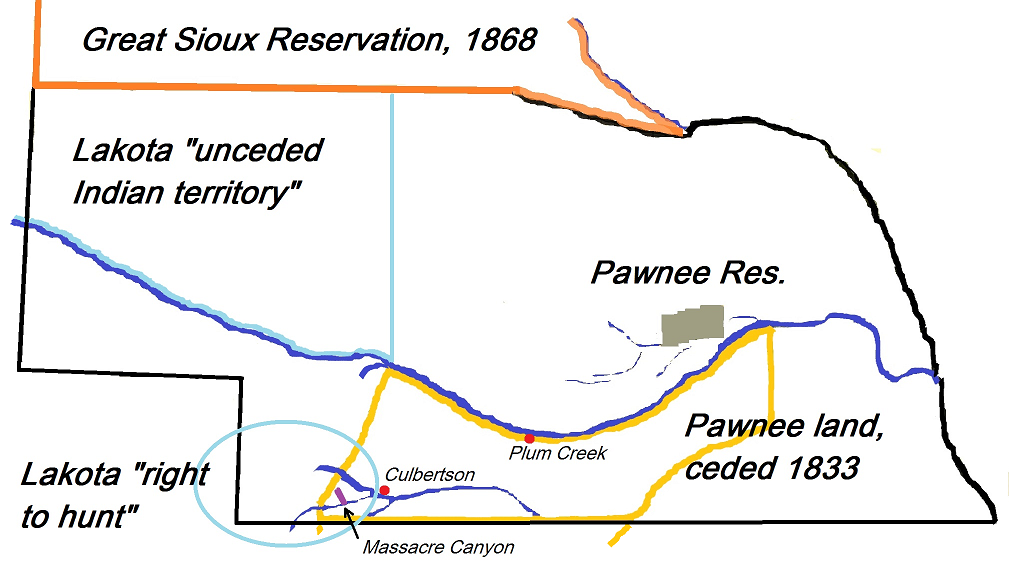
Massacre Canyon battlefield (1873), Nebraska. Pawnee reservation and relevant territories. The last major battle was between two big hunting parties, Lakota and Pawnee. It cost the lives of a minimum of ten children, 20 men and 39 women from the Pawnee tribe, counting Chief Sky Chief. The battle was fought on U.S. ground more than 180 miles outside both reservations.

The Sioux burned a village of Nuptadi Mandans in the last quarter of the 18th century. Other villages of the Mandan, Hidatsa, and Arikara destroyed either completely or partially in attacks are two Hidatsa villages in 1834, Mitutanka on January 9, 1839 and Like-a-Fishhook Village in 1862. The three tribes would routinely ask the U.S. army for assistance against stronger powers until the end of intertribal warfare in the area.

Eighteen out of 30 prominent Poncas were killed in a surprise attack in 1824, "including the famous Smoke-maker". At a stroke, the small tribe stood without any experienced leaders. In 1859, the Poncas lost two chiefs when a combined group of enemies charged a hunting camp. Half a Pawnee village was set ablaze during a large-scale attack in 1843, and the Pawnee never rebuilt it. More than 60 inhabitants lost their lives, including Chief Blue Coat. The otherwise numerous Small Robes band of the Piegan Blackfoot lost influence and some self-reliance after a severe River Crow attack on a moving camp at "Mountains on Both Sides" (Judith Gap, Montana) in 1845. "Their days of greatness were over." In 1852, an Omaha delegation visited Washington, D.C. It would "request the federal government's protection". Five different nations raided the Omaha.

== 19th-century bison hunts and near-extinction ==
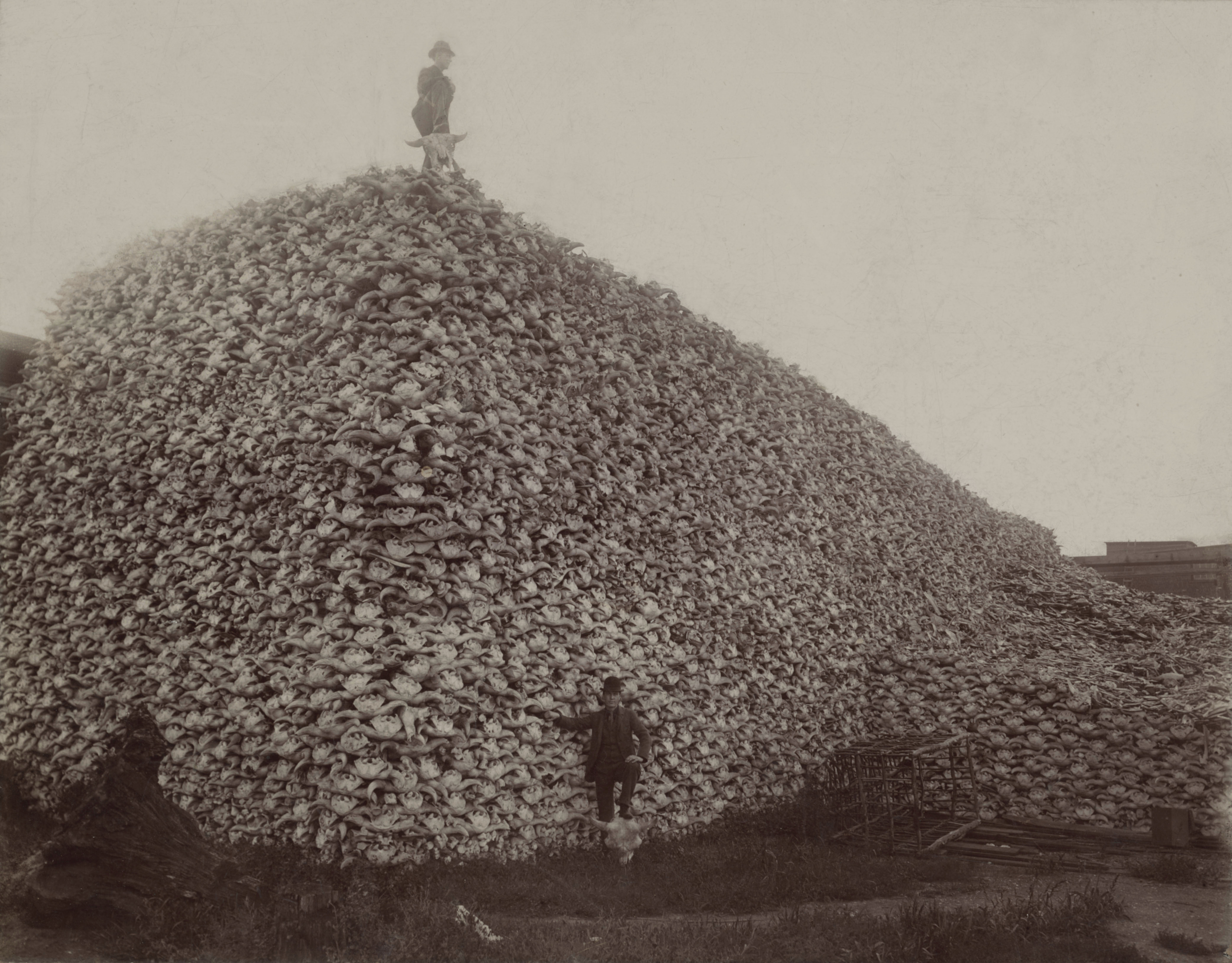
1892: bison skulls await industrial processing at Michigan Carbon Works in Rougeville (a suburb of Detroit). Bones were processed to be used for glue, fertilizer, dye/tint/ink, or were burned to create "bone char" which was an important component for sugar refining. In the 16th century, North America contained 25–30 million buffalo.

In the 19th century, European settlers hunted bison almost to extinction. Fewer than 100 remained in the wild by the late 1880s. Unlike Indigenous practices, where hunters took only what was needed and used the whole animal, these settlers hunted them en masse for only their skins and tongues and left the rest of the animal behind to decay on the ground. After the animals rotted, their bones were collected and shipped back east in large quantities.

Due to the roaming behavior of bison, their mass destruction came with relative ease to the European hunters. When one bison in a herd is killed, the other bison gather around it. Due to this pattern, the ability of a hunter to kill one bison often led to the destruction of a large herd of them.

Map of the extermination of the bison to 1889. This map is based on William Temple Hornaday's late-19th-century research. Original range Range as of 1870 Range as of 1889

In 1889, an essay in a journal of the time observed:

Thirty years ago millions of the great unwieldy animals existed on this continent. Innumerable droves roamed, comparatively undisturbed and unmolested ... Many thousands have been ruthlessly and shamefully slain every season for past twenty years or more by white hunters and tourists merely for their robes, and in sheer wanton sport, and their huge carcasses left to fester and rot, and their bleached skeletons to strew the deserts and lonely plains.

Indigenous peoples whose lives depended on the Buffalo also continued to hunt, and they were faced with having to adapt to the arrival of European settlers in the Plains. While most struggled to continue their traditional ways, other Plains cultures were forced to adapt their style of hunting. Andrew Isenberg argues that some Native people embraced the fur trade and that adapting their hunting methods to include hunting on horseback, added to the number of bison they could hunt.

=== Commercial incentives ===
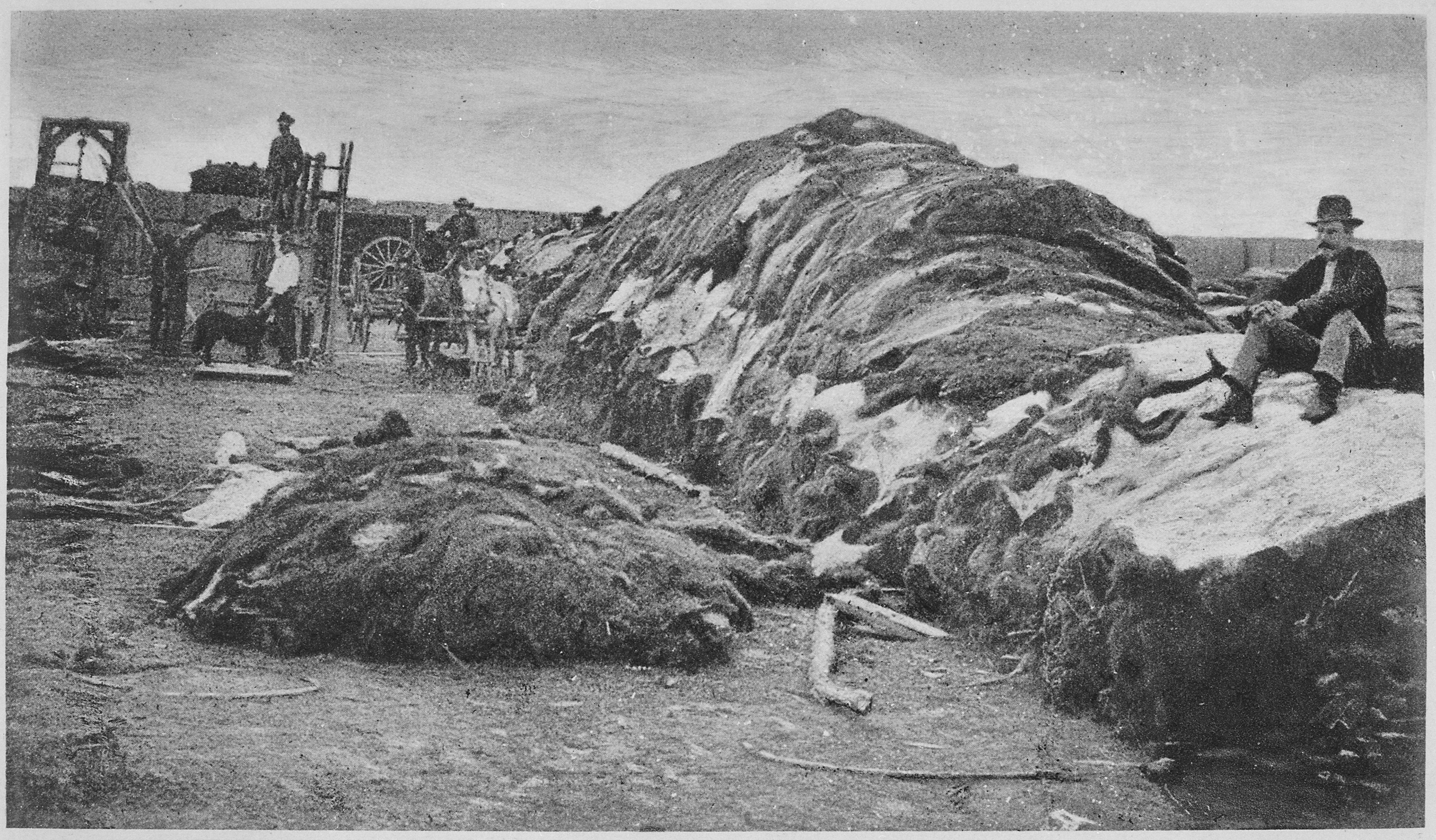
Rath & Wright's buffalo hide yard in Dodge City, Kansas, shows 40,000 buffalo hides.

For settlers of the Plains region, bison hunting served as a way to increase their economic stake in the area. Trappers and traders made their living selling buffalo fur; in the winter of 1872–1873, more than 1.5 million buffalo were put onto trains and moved eastward. In addition to the potential profits from buffalo leather, which was commonly used to make machinery belts and army boots, buffalo hunting forced Natives to become dependent on beef from cattle. General Winfield Scott Hancock, for example, reminded several Arapaho chiefs at Fort Dodge in 1867: "You know well that the game is getting very scarce and that you must soon have some other means of living; you should therefore cultivate the friendship of the white man, so that when the game is all gone, they may take care of you if necessary."

Commercial bison hunters also emerged at this time. Military forts often supported hunters, who would use their civilian sources near their military base. Though officers hunted bison for food and sport, professional hunters made a far larger impact on the decline of the bison population. Officers stationed in Fort Hays and Wallace even had bets in their "buffalo shooting championship of the world", between "Medicine Bill" Comstock and "Buffalo Bill" Cody. Some of these hunters would engage in mass bison slaughter to make a living.

=== Government involvement ===
The US Army sanctioned and actively endorsed the wholesale slaughter of bison herds. The federal government promoted bison hunting for various reasons, primarily to pressure the native people onto the Indian reservations during times of conflict by removing their main food source. Without the bison, native people of the plains were often forced to leave the land or starve to death. One of the biggest advocates of this strategy was General William Tecumseh Sherman. On June 26, 1869, the Army Navy Journal reported: "General Sherman remarked, in conversation the other day, that the quickest way to compel the Indians to settle down to civilized life was to send ten regiments of soldiers to the plains, with orders to shoot buffaloes until they became too scarce to support the redskins."

Similarly, Lieutenant General John M. Schofield would write in his memoirs: "With my cavalry and carbined artillery encamped in front, I wanted no other occupation in life than to ward off the savage and kill off his food until there should no longer be an Indian frontier in our beautiful country." In 1874, President Ulysses S. Grant vetoed the act of Congress HR 921, which would have implemented protections against non-indigenous overhunting of buffalo. Before this, Secretary of the Interior, Columbus Delano, had stated the following regarding complaints about non-indigenous hunting buffalo on native reservations:

"While I would not seriously regret the total disappearance of the buffalo from our western prairies, in its effect on the Indians, regarding it rather as a means of hastening their sense of dependence upon the products of the soil and their own labors, yet these encroachments by the non-indigenous upon the reservations set apart for the exclusive occupancy of the Indian is one prolific source of trouble in the management of the reservation Indians, and measures should be adopted to prevent such trespasses in the future, or very serious collisions may be the result."

Demonstrating clearly that he saw non-indigenous poaching of bison as a problem only because it may lead to retaliation from the Indians, and on the contrary, that he saw the extermination of the buffalo as potentially beneficial in the forced assimilation of Indians.

According to Professor David Smits: "Frustrated bluecoats, unable to deliver a punishing blow to the so-called 'Hostiles', unless they were immobilized in their winter camps, could, however, strike at a more accessible target, namely, the buffalo. That tactic also made curious sense, for in soldiers' minds the buffalo and the Plains Indian were virtually inseparable."

=== Native American involvement ===
According to Finnish historian Pekka Hämäläinen, a few Native American tribes also partly contributed to the collapse of the bison in the southern Plains. By the 1830s the Comanche and their allies on the southern plains were killing about 280,000 bison a year, which was near the limit of sustainability for that region. Firearms and horses, along with a growing export market for buffalo robes and bison meat had resulted in larger and larger numbers of bison killed each year. A long and intense drought hit the southern plains in 1845, lasting into the 1860s, which caused a widespread collapse of the bison herds. In the 1860s, the rains returned and the bison herds recovered to a degree.

=== Railroad involvement ===
After the Pacific Railroad Act of 1862, the West experienced a large boom in the colonist population—and a large decline in the bison population. As railways expanded, military troops and supplies were able to be transported more efficiently to the Plains region. Some railroads even hired commercial hunters to feed their laborers. William Frederick "Buffalo Bill" Cody, for example, was hired by the Kansas Pacific Railroad for this reason.

Hunters began arriving in masses, and trains would often slow down on their routes to allow for raised hunting. Men would either climb aboard the roofs of trains or fire shots at herds from outside their windows. As a description of this from Harper's Weekly noted: "The train is 'slowed' to a speed about equal to that of the herd; the passengers get out fire-arms which are provided for the defense of the train against the Indians, and open from the windows and platforms of the cars a fire that resembles a brisk skirmish."

The railroad industry also wanted bison herds culled or eliminated. Herds of bison on tracks could damage locomotives when the trains failed to stop in time. Herds often took shelter in the artificial cuts formed by the grade of the track winding through hills and mountains in harsh winter conditions. As a result, bison herds could delay a train for days.

=== Commercial hunting ===
Bison skins were most often used for industrial machine belts, clothing, and rugs. There was a huge export trade to Europe of bison hides. Old West bison hunting was very often a big commercial enterprise, involving organized teams of one or two professional hunters, backed by a team of skinners, gun cleaners, cartridge reloaders, cooks, wranglers, blacksmiths, security guards, teamsters, and numerous horses and wagons. Men were even employed to recover and recast lead bullets taken from the carcasses. Many of these professional hunters, such as Buffalo Bill Cody, killed over a hundred animals at a single stand and many thousands in their careers. One professional hunter killed over 20,000 by his count. The average prices paid the buffalo hunters from 1880 to 1884 were about as follows: For cow hides, $3; bull hides, $2.50; yearlings, $1.50; calves, $0.75; and the cost of getting the hides to market brought the cost up to about $3.50 ($89.68 accounting for inflation) per hide.

The hunter would customarily locate the herd in the early morning, and station himself about 100 yd (91 m) from it, shooting the animals broadside through the lungs. Head shots were not preferred as the soft lead bullets would often flatten and fail to penetrate the skull, especially if mud was matted on the head of the animal. The bison would continue to drop until either the herd sensed danger and stampeded or perhaps a wounded animal attacked another, causing the herd to disperse. If done properly a large number of bison would be felled at one time. Following up were the skinners, who would drive a spike through the nose of each dead animal with a sledgehammer, hook up a horse team, and pull the hide from the carcass. The hides were dressed, prepared, and stacked on the wagons by other members of the organization.

For a decade after 1873, there were several hundred, perhaps over a thousand, such commercial hide-hunting outfits harvesting bison at any one time, vastly exceeding the take by Native Americans or individual meat hunters. The commercial take arguably was anywhere from 2,000 to 100,000 animals per day depending on the season, though there are no statistics available. It was said that the .50 caliber (12.7mm) rifles were fired so much that buffalo hunters needed at least two or three rifles to allow the barrels cool off; The Fireside Book of Guns reports that the rifles were sometimes quenched in the winter snow to expedite the process. Dodge City saw railroad cars sent East filled with stacked hides.

The building of the railroads through Colorado and Kansas split the bison herd into two parts, the southern herd and the northern herd. The last refuge of the southern herd was in the Texas Panhandle.

=== Discussion of bison protection ===
As the great herds began to wane, proposals to protect the bison were discussed. In some cases, individual military officers attempted to end the mass slaughter of these buffalo. William F. "Buffalo Bill" Cody, among others, spoke in favor of protecting the bison because he saw that the pressure on the species was too great. Yet these proposals were discouraged since it was recognized that the Plains Indians, some of the tribes often at war with the United States, depended on bison for their way of life. (Other buffalo-hunting tribes cannot tell of a single fight with the United States, namely tribes like the Assiniboine, the Hidatsa, the Gros Ventre, the Ponca and the Omaha).

In 1874, President Ulysses S. Grant "pocket vetoed" a Federal bill to protect the dwindling bison herds, and in 1875 General Philip Sheridan pleaded to a joint session of Congress to slaughter the herds, to deprive the Indians of their source of food. By 1884, the American bison was close to extinction.

Subsequent settlers harvested bison bones to be sold for fertilizer. It was an important source of supplemental income for poorer farmers, which lasted from the early 1880s until the early 1890s.

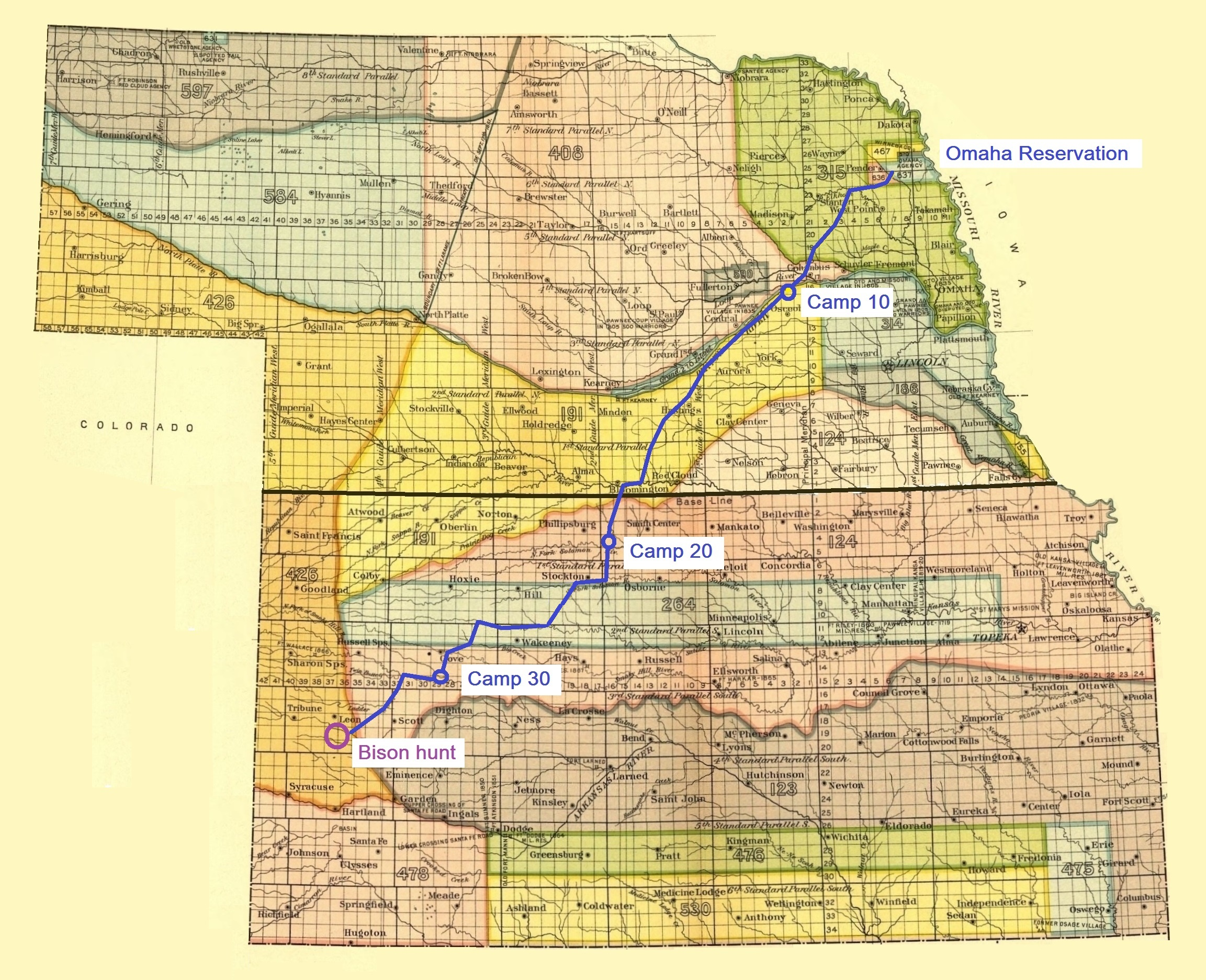
The last tribal hunt of the Omaha, December 1876 to March 1877. After more than 30 camp moves, the hunters finally found a herd 400 miles outside the Omaha Reservation (Nebraska). In 1912, Gilmore secured the account of the hunting expedition into Kansas from Francis La Flesche. La Flesche was one of the Omaha scouts looking for a game. (Route approximately).

=== Early reservation era final hunts ===
During the 1870s and 1880s, more and more tribes went on their last great bison hunt.

Led by Chief Washakie, around 1,800 Shoshones in the Wind River Indian Reservation in Wyoming started in October 1874. Going north, the men, women, and children crossed the border of the reservation. Scouts came back with news of buffalo near Gooseberry Creek. The hunters got around 125 bison. Fewer hunters left the reservation over the next two years and those who went focused on elk, deer, and other game.

The final hunt of the Omaha in Nebraska took place in December 1876.

Hidatsa rebel Crow Flies High and his group established themselves on the Fort Buford Military Reservation, North Dakota, at the start of the 1870s and hunted bison in the Yellowstone area until the game went scarce during the next decade.

Indian agents, with insufficient funds, accepted long hunting expeditions of the Flathead and Pend d'Oreille to the plains in the late 1870s. In the early 1880s, the buffalo were gone.

The Gros Ventre left the Fort Belknap Indian Reservation in Montana for a hunt north of Milk River in 1877. Chief Jerry Running Fisher enlisted as a scout at Fort Assinniboine in 1881. "His camp stayed close to the troops when they patrolled, so they hunted undisturbed by enemy tribes." Two years later, the buffalo were all but gone.

In June 1882, more than 600 Lakota and Yanktonai hunters located a big herd on the plains far west of the Standing Rock Agency. In this last hunt, they got around 5,000 animals.

== Bison population crash and its effect on Indigenous people ==
Following the Civil War, the U.S. had ratified roughly 400 treaties with the Plains tribes but went on to break many of these in pursuit of the settler-colonialist belief in Manifest Destiny. The bison population crash represented a loss of spirit, land, and autonomy for most Indigenous People at this time. The effects of the collapse have been wide-ranging and persistent:

Once amongst the tallest people in the world, the generations of bison-reliant people born after the slaughter lost their entire height advantage. By the early twentieth century, child mortality was 16 percentage points higher and the probability of reporting an occupation 19 percentage points lower in bison nations compared with nations that were never reliant on the bison. Throughout the latter half of the twentieth century and into the present, income per capita has remained 25% lower, on average, for bison nations.

=== Loss of land ===
Much of the land delegated to Indigenous tribes during this westward expansion were barren tracts of land, far from any buffalo herds. These reservations were not sustainable for Natives, who relied on bison for food. One of these reservations was the Sand Creek Reservation in southeastern Colorado. The nearest buffalo herd was over two hundred miles away, and many Cheyennes began leaving the reservation, forced to hunt livestock of nearby settlers and passing wagon trains.

=== Loss of food source ===
Plains Indians adopted a nomadic lifestyle, one which depended on bison location for their food source. Bison is high in protein levels and low in fat content and contributes to the wholesome diet of Native Americans. Additionally, they used every edible part of the bison—organs, brains, fetuses, and placental membranes included.

=== Loss of autonomy ===
As a consequence of the great bison slaughter, they became more heavily dependent on the U.S. Government and American traders for their needs. Many military men recognized the bison slaughter as a way of reducing the autonomy of Indigenous Peoples. For instance, Lieutenant Colonel Dodge, a high-ranking military officer, once said in a conversation with Frank H. Mayer: "Mayer, there's no two ways about it, either the buffalo or the Indian must go. Only when the Indian becomes absolutely dependent on us for his every need, will we be able to handle him. He's too independent with the buffalo. But if we kill the buffalo we conquer the Indian. It seems a more humane thing to kill the buffalo than the Indian, so the buffalo must go."

" The country's highest generals, politicians, and even then President Ulysses S. Grant saw the destruction of buffalo as solution to the country's "Indian Problem"."

Even Richard Henry Pratt, founder of the Carlisle Indian School and a Tenth Cavalry lieutenant in the Red River War, discussed this strategy after his retirement: "The general destruction of the buffalo was ordered as a military measure because it was plain that the Indians could not be controlled on their reservations as long as their greatest resource, the buffalo, were so plentiful."

The destruction of bison signaled the end of the Indian Wars, and consequently their movement towards reservations. When the Texas legislature proposed a bill to protect the bison, General Sheridan disapproved of it, stating, "These men have done more in the last two years, and will do more in the next year, to settle the vexed Indian question, than the entire regular army has done in the last forty years. They are destroying the Indians' commissary. It is a well-known fact that an army losing its base of supplies is placed at a great disadvantage. Send them powder and lead, if you will; but for a lasting peace, let them kill, skin, and sell until the buffaloes are exterminated. Then your prairies can be covered with speckled cattle."

=== Spiritual effects ===
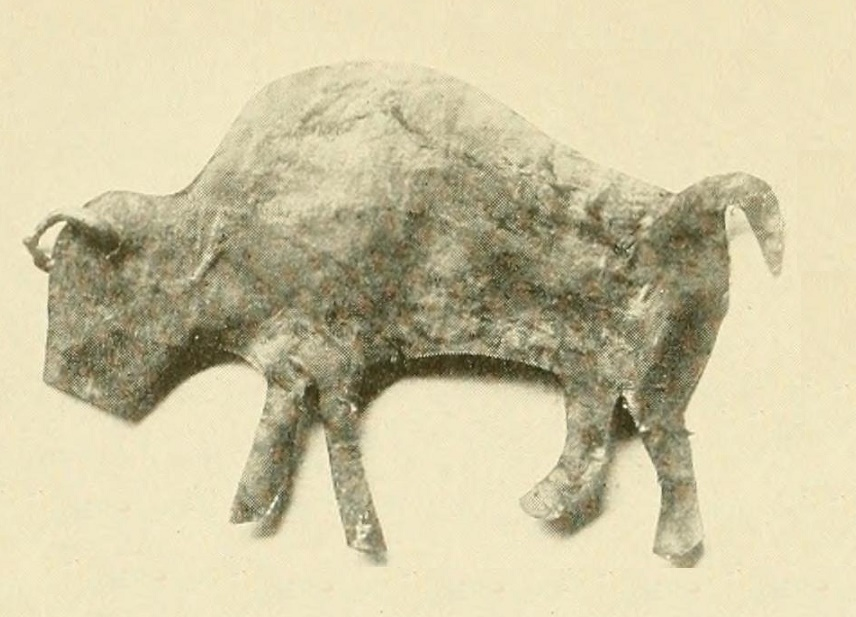
Skin effigy of a Buffalo used in the Lakota Sun Dance

Most Native American tribes regard the bison as a sacred animal and religious symbol. University of Montana anthropology professor S. Neyooxet Greymorning stated: "The creation stories of where buffalo came from put them in a very spiritual place among many tribes. The buffalo crossed many different areas and functions, and it was utilized in many ways. It was used in ceremonies, as well as to make tipi covers that provide homes for people, utensils, shields, weapons, and parts were used for sewing with the sinew." In fact, many tribes had "buffalo doctors", who claimed to have learned from bison in symbolic visions. Also, many Plains tribes used the bison skull for confessions and blessing burial sites.

Though buffalo were being slaughtered in masses, many tribes perceived the buffalo as part of the natural world—something guaranteed to them by the Creator. For some Plains Indigenous peoples, buffalo are known as the first people. Many tribes did not grasp the concept of species extinction. Thus, when the buffalo began to disappear in great numbers, it was particularly harrowing to the tribes. As Crow Chief Plenty Coups described it: "When the buffalo went away, the hearts of my people fell to the ground, and they could not lift them up again. After this nothing happened. There was little singing anywhere." Spiritual loss was rampant; buffalo were an integral part of their society and they would frequently take part in ceremonies for each buffalo they killed to honor its sacrifice. To boost morale during this time, the Sioux and other tribes took part in the Ghost Dance, which consisted of hundreds of people dancing until 100 persons were lying unconscious.

Native Americans served as the caretakers of bison, so their forced movement towards bison-free reservation areas was particularly challenging. Upon their arrival to reservations, some tribes asked government officials if they could hunt cattle the way they hunted buffalo. During these cattle hunts, Plains tribes would dress up in their finery, sing bison songs, and attempt to simulate a bison hunt. These cattle hunts served as a way for the tribes to preserve their ceremonies, community, and morale. However, the U.S. government soon put a halt to cattle hunts, choosing to package the beef up for the Native Americans instead.

=== Ecological effect ===
The mass buffalo slaughter also seriously harmed the ecological health of the Great Plains region, in which many Indigenous People lived. Unlike cattle, bison were naturally fit to thrive in the Great Plains environment; bison's giant heads are adapted to driving through snow, making them far more likely to survive harsh winters. Bison grazing helps to cultivate the prairie, making it ripe for hosting a diverse range of plants. Cattle, in contrast, eat through vegetation and limit the ecosystem's ability to support a diverse range of species. Agricultural and residential development of the prairie is estimated to have reduced the prairie to 0.1% of its former area. The plains region has lost nearly one-third of its prime topsoil since the onset of the buffalo slaughter. Cattle are also causing water to be pillaged at rates that are depleting many aquifers of their resources. Research also suggests that the absence of native grasses leads to topsoil erosion—a main contributor to the Dust Bowl and black blizzards of the 1930s.

== Resurgence of the bison ==
=== Beginnings of resurgence ===
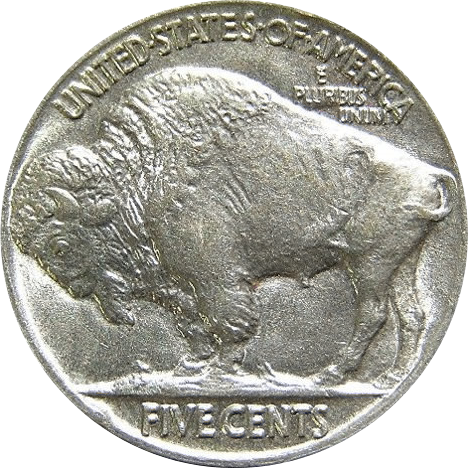
The reverse of the buffalo nickel paid numismatic tribute, starting in 1913, to the American bison and its rescue from extinction

William Temple Hornaday of the New York Zoological Park's 1887 report, "The Extermination of the American bison" (published in book form in 1889), predicted that bison would be extinct within two decades. Hornaday founded the American Bison Society in 1905, supported by Theodore Roosevelt, to found, stock, and protect bison sanctuaries. Notable early buffalo conservationists included:

==== James "Scotty" Philip ====
The famous herd of James "Scotty" Philip in South Dakota was one of the earliest reintroductions of bison to North America. In 1899, Philip purchased a small herd (five of them, including the female) from Dug Carlin, Pete Dupree's brother-in-law, whose son Fred had roped five calves in the Last Big Buffalo Hunt on the Grand River in 1881 and taken them back home to the ranch on the Cheyenne River. Scotty's goal was to preserve the animal from extinction. At the time of his death in 1911 at 53, Philip had grown the herd to an estimated 1,000 to 1,200 head of bison. A variety of privately owned herds had also been established, starting from this population.

==== Michel Pablo & Charles Allard ====
In 1873, Samuel Walking Coyote, a member of the Pend d'Oreille tribe, herded seven orphan calves along the Flathead Reservation west of the Rocky Mountain divide. In 1899, he sold 13 of these bison to ranchers Charles Allard and Michel Pablo for $2,000 in gold. Michel Pablo and Charles Allard spent more than 20 years assembling one of the largest collections of purebred bison on the continent (by the time of Allard's death in 1896, the herd numbered 300). In 1907, after U.S. authorities declined to buy the herd, Pablo struck a deal with the Canadian government and shipped most of his bison northward to the newly created Elk Island National Park.

==== Wichita Mountains Wildlife Refuge ====
Also, in 1907, the New York Zoological Park sent 15 bison to Wichita Mountains Wildlife Refuge in Oklahoma forming the nucleus of a herd that now numbers 650.

==== Yellowstone Park ====
The Yellowstone Park Bison Herd formed naturally from a few bison that remained in the Yellowstone Park area after the great slaughter at the end of the 19th century. Yellowstone National Park is one of the very few areas where wild bison were never completely extirpated. It is the only continuously wild bison herd in the United States. Numbering between 3,000 and 3,500, the Yellowstone Park bison herd is descended from a remnant population of 23 individual bison that survived the mass slaughter of the 19th century by hiding out in the Pelican Valley of Yellowstone Park. In 1902, a captive herd of 21 plains bison was introduced to the Lamar Valley in Yellowstone and managed as livestock until the 1960s, when a policy of natural regulation was adopted by the park. Many of the national parks, in particular the Yellowstone National Park, are a direct result of the guilt that many felt regarding the buffalo slaughter of the Great Plains.

==== Antelope Island ====
The Antelope Island bison herd is an isolated bison herd on Utah's Antelope Island and was founded from 12 animals that came from a private ranch in Texas in the late 1800s. The Antelope Island bison herd fluctuates between 550 and 700 and is one of the largest publicly owned bison herds in the nation. The herd contains some unique genetic traits and has been used to improve the genetic diversity of American bison, however, as is the case with most bison herds, some genes from domestic cattle have been found in the Antelope Island Bison Herd.

==== Molly Goodnight ====
The last of the remaining "southern herd" in Texas were saved before extinction in 1876. Charles Goodnight's wife Molly encouraged him to save some of the last relict bison that had taken refuge in the Texas Panhandle. Extremely committed to saving this herd, she went as far as to rescue some young orphaned buffaloes and even bottle-fed and cared for them until adulthood. By saving these few plains bison, she was able to establish an impressive buffalo herd near the Palo Duro Canyon. Peaking at 250 in 1933, the last of the southern buffalo would become known as the Goodnight herd. The descendants of this southern herd were moved to Caprock Canyons State Park near Quitaque, Texas, in 1998.

==== Austin Corbin ====
In 1904 the naturalist Ernest Harold Baynes (1868–1925) was appointed conservator of the Corbin Park game reserve in New Hampshire (on the edge of the Blue Mountain Forest), by Austin Corbin, Jr. (d.1938), whose father, the banker and railroad entrepreneur Austin Corbin (1827–1896) had established it. Known as the "Blue Mountain Forest Association", it was a limited membership proprietary hunting club, the park for which comprised 26,000 acres, covering the townships of Cornish, Croydon, Grantham, Newport, and Plainfield.

Corbin Sr. imported American bison from Oklahoma, Montana, Wyoming, Manitoba, and Texas, and donated bison to other American zoos and preserves. He also imported exotic species from Europe and Canada, including wild boar from the Black Forest of Germany. From a natural level of 60 million in America, the bison population had been reduced by human activity to just 1,000 by the 1890s, and in 1904, 160 of those animals lived within Corbin Park. The Corbin herd was destroyed in the 1940s following an outbreak of brucellosis.

Baynes was famous for his tame bison, and for driving around the park in a carriage pulled by a pair of bison. Amongst his published works is War Whoop and Tomahawk: The Story of Two Buffalo Calves (1929). Baynes commented:

"Of all the works of the late Mr. Austin Corbin, the preservation of that herd of bison was the one that would earn his country's deepest gratitude. His experiment led to the founding of the American Bison Society and was connected, directly or otherwise, with the formation of some of our national parks".

=== Modern bison resurgence efforts ===
Many other bison herds are in the process of being created or have been created in state parks and national parks, and on private ranches, with individuals taken from the existing main 'foundation herds'. An example is the Henry Mountains bison herd in Central Utah which was founded in 1941 with bison that were relocated from Yellowstone National Park. This herd now numbers approximately 400 individuals and in the last decade, steps have been taken to expand this herd to the mountains of the Book Cliffs, also in Utah.

One of the largest privately owned herds, numbering 2,500, in the US, is on the Tallgrass Prairie Preserve in Oklahoma which is owned by the Nature Conservancy. Ted Turner was the largest private owner of bison with about 50,000 on several different ranches.

The current American bison population has been growing rapidly and is estimated at 350,000 compared to an estimated 60 to 100 million in the mid-19th century. Most current herds, however, are genetically polluted or partly crossbred with cattle. Today there are only four genetically unmixed, free-roaming, public bison herds and only two that are also free of brucellosis: the Henry Mountains bison herd and the Wind Cave bison herd. A founder population of 16 animals from the Wind Cave bison herd was re-established in Montana in 2005 by the American Prairie Foundation. The herd now numbers nearly 800 and roams a 14,000-acre (57 km^{2}) grassland expanse on American Prairie.

The end of the ranching era and the onset of the natural regulation era set into motion a chain of events that have led to the bison of Yellowstone Park migrating to lower elevations outside the park in search of winter forage. The presence of wild bison in Montana is perceived as a threat to many cattle ranchers, who fear that bison may carry brucellosis and infect livestock which causes cows to abort their first calves. There has never been a documented case of brucellosis being transmitted to cattle from wild bison. The management became an issue in the early 1980s and continues with advocacy groups arguing that the herd should be protected as a distinct population segment under the Endangered Species Act.

==== Native American bison conservation efforts ====
Many conservation measures have been taken by Native American tribes to preserve and grow the bison population as well. Of these Native conservation efforts, the Inter-Tribal Bison Council was formed in 1990, composed of 56 tribes in 19 states. These tribes represent a collective herd of more than 15,000 bison and focus on reestablishing herds on tribal lands to promote culture, revitalize spiritual solidarity, and restore the ecosystem. Some Inter-Tribal Bison Council members argue that the bison's economic value is one of the main factors driving its resurgence. Bison serves as a low-cost substitute for cattle and can withstand the winters in the Plains region far easier than cattle.

A Native American conservation effort that has been gaining ground is the Buffalo Field Campaign. Founded in 1996 by Mike Mease, Sicango Lakota, and Rosalie Little Thunder, the Buffalo Field Campaign hopes to get bison migrating freely in Montana and beyond. The Buffalo Field Campaign challenges Montana's DOL officials, who slaughtered 1631 bison in the winter of 2007–2008 in a food search away from Yellowstone National Park. Founder Mike Mease commented in regards to DOL officials: "It's disheartening what they're doing to buffalo. It's marked with prejudice that exists from way back. I think the whole problem with white society is there's this fear of anything wild. They're so scared of anything they can't control, whereas the First Nations take pride in being part of it and protecting the wild because of its importance. Our culture is so far removed from that, and afraid of it."

Additionally, many smaller tribal groups aim to reintroduce bison to their native lands. The Ponca Tribe of Nebraska, which was restored in 1990, has a herd of roughly 100 bison in two pastures. Similarly, the Southern Ute Tribe in Colorado has raised nearly 30 bison in a 350-acre fenced pasture.

According to Rutgers University Professor Frank Popper, bison restoration brings better meat and ecological health to the plains region, in addition to restoring bison-native American relations. However, there is a considerable risk involved with restoring the bison population: brucellosis. If bison are introduced in large numbers, the risk of brucellosis is high.

==== Bison conservation: a symbol of Native American healing ====
For some spokesmen, the resurgence of the bison population reflects a cultural and spiritual recovery from the effects of bison hunting in the mid-1800s. By creating groups such as the Inter-Tribal Bison Cooperative and the Buffalo Field Campaign, Native Americans are hoping to not only restore the bison population but also improve solidarity and morale among their tribes. "We recognize the bison as a symbol of strength in unity," stated Fred Dubray, former president of the Inter-Tribal Bison Cooperative. "We believe that reintroduction of the buffalo to tribal lands will help heal the spirit of both the Indian people and the buffalo. To reestablish healthy buffalo populations is to reestablish hope for Indian people."

== Modern hunting ==
Hunting of wild bison is legal in some states and provinces where public herds require culling to maintain a target population.

=== Canada ===
==== Alberta ====
In Alberta, where one of only two continuously wild herds of bison exist in North America at Wood Buffalo National Park, bison are hunted to protect disease-free public (reintroduced) and private herds of bison.

=== United States ===
==== Montana ====
In Montana, a public hunt was reestablished in 2005, with 50 permits being issued. The Montana Fish, Wildlife, and Parks Commission increased the number of tags to 140 for the 2006/2007 season. Advocacy groups claim that it is premature to reestablish the hunt, given the bison's lack of habitat and wildlife status in Montana.

Though the number is usually several hundred, up to more than a thousand bison from the Yellowstone Park Bison Herd have been killed in some years when they wander north from the Lamar Valley of Yellowstone National Park into private and state lands of Montana. This hunting is often done because of fears that Yellowstone bison infected with brucellosis will spread the disease to local domestic cattle. To date, no credible instance of bison-to-cattle transmission has ever been established, recorded or proven although there is some evidence of transmission between wild caribou and bison.

==== Utah ====
The State of Utah maintains two bison herds, and some bison hunting is permitted for both of them – the Antelope Island bison herd (which contains 550 to 700 individuals) and the Henry Mountains bison herd (250 to 400 individuals), though the licenses are limited and tightly controlled. A game ranger is also generally sent out with any hunters to help them find and select the bison to kill. In this way, hunting is used as a part of the wildlife management strategy and to help cull less desirable individuals.

Every year all the bison in the Antelope Island bison herd are rounded up to be examined and vaccinated. Then, most of them are turned loose to wander Antelope Island. Approximately 100 bison are sold at an auction, and hunters are allowed to kill a half dozen bison. This hunting takes place on Antelope Island in December each year. Fees from the hunters are used to fund the maintenance of the Antelope Island State Park and the bison herd.

Hunting is also allowed every year in the Henry Mountains bison herd in Utah. The Henry Mountains herd has sometimes numbered up to 500 individuals but the Utah Division of Wildlife Resources has determined that the carrying capacity for the Henry Mountains bison herd is 325 individuals. Some of the extra individuals have been transplanted, but most of them are not transplanted or sold, so hunting is the major tool used to control their population. "In 2009, 146 public once-in-a-lifetime Henry Mountain bison hunting permits were issued." Most years, 50 to 100 licenses are issued to hunt bison in the Henry Mountains.

==== Alaska ====
Bison were also reintroduced to Alaska in 1928, and both domestic and wild herds are found in a few parts of the state. The state grants limited permits to hunt wild bison each year.

=== Mexico ===
In 2001, the United States government donated some bison calves from South Dakota and Colorado to the Mexican government for the reintroduction of bison to Mexico's nature reserves. These reserves included El Uno Ranch at Janos and Santa Elena Canyon, Chihuahua, and Boquillas del Carmen, Coahuila, which are located on the southern shore of the Rio Grande and the grasslands bordering Texas and New Mexico.

== See also ==
- American Bison Society
- Bovid hybrid
- Buffalo Commons
- Buffalo Hunters' War
- European bison
