= Martin Bear's Arm =

American painter

- Born: c. 1864; Like-a-Fishhook Village, Dakota Territory
- Citizenship: Mandan, Hidatsa
- Occupations: painter, historian

Martin Bear's Arm (born c. 1864) was a tribal historian of the Hidatsa (Gros Ventres) tribe. He was born in and lived for a time in Like-a-Fishhook Village on the Fort Berthold Indian Reservation in central North Dakota. Bear's Arm was an artist particularly known for a pictographic chart of Like-a-Fishhook Village, as it was before the village was abandoned in the 1880s. His work is in the collection of the State Historical Society of North Dakota.
