= Crow Flies High State Recreation Area =

Park in North Dakota, USA

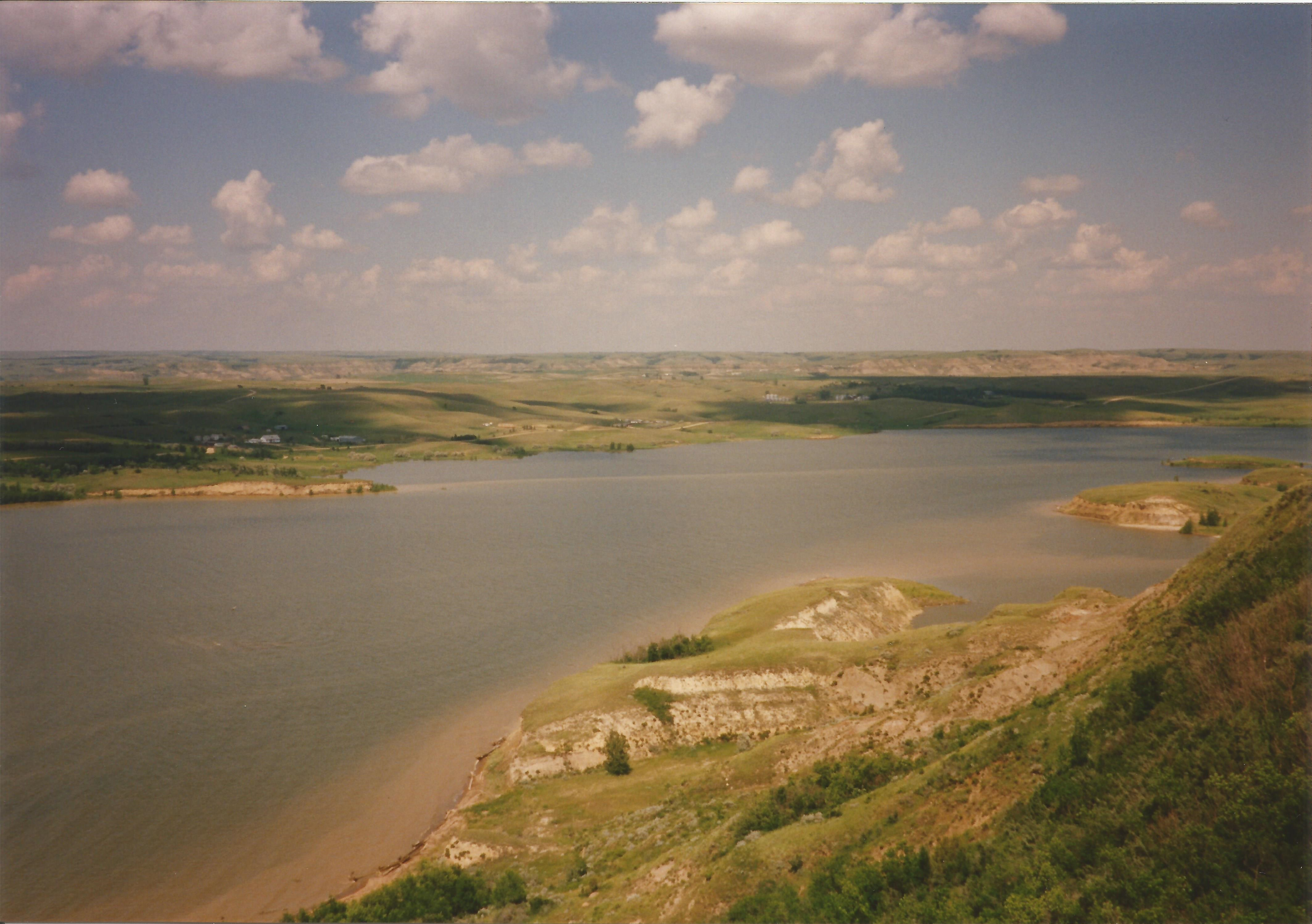
- Lake Sakakawea from Crow Flies High view point

- Location within North Dakota
- Interactive map of Crow Flies High; State Recreation Area
- Location: Mountrail County, North Dakota, United States
- Nearest city: New Town, North Dakota
- Coordinates: 47°58′57″N 102°32′45″W
- Area: 247.11 acres (100.00 ha)
- Elevation: 2,087 ft (636 m)
- Established: 1956
- Administrator: North Dakota Parks and Recreation Department
- Designation: North Dakota state park
- Named for: Crow Flies High, Hidatsa Indian chief
- Website: Crow Flies High State Recreation Area

Crow Flies High State Recreation Area is a scenic overlook located two miles west of New Town in Mountrail County, North Dakota. The site provides scenic views of Lake Sakakawea. Signs describe the location's role in local history, including its significance in the explorations of Lewis and Clark. The footprint of the drowned town of Sanish, now lost below the reservoir's waves, can be seen at times of low water.

The park was owned by the National Park Service from 1917 until 1956, when ownership was transferred to North Dakota. It is named after Hidatsa Indian chief Crow Flies High.

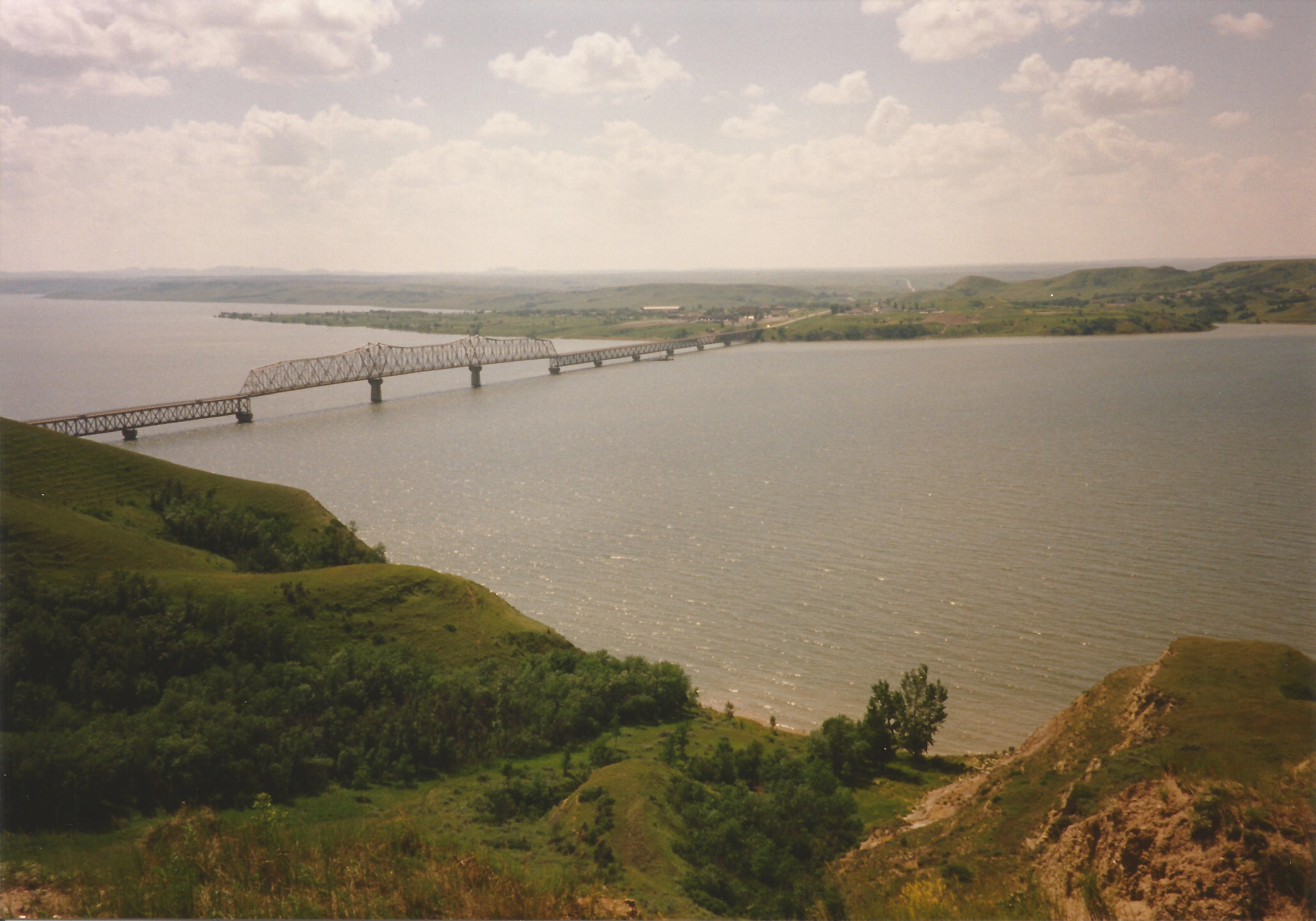
The old Four Bears Bridge spanning Lake Sakakawea/Missouri River seen from Crow Flies High view point, Fort Berthold Indian Reservation, North Dakota
