= Crow Flies High =

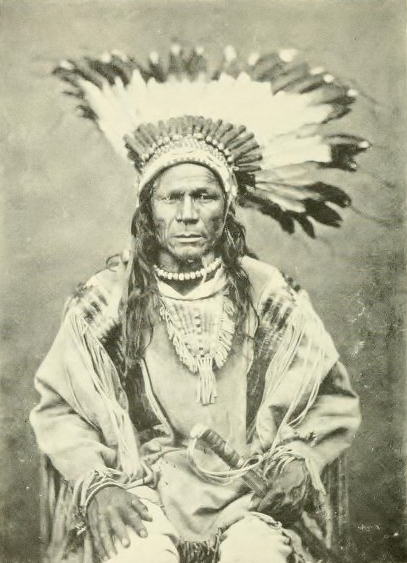
Hidatsa chief and rebel Crow Flies High (also known as Crow Fly, Raven Ascending and Heart). He and his followers were among the last Native Americans in the United States to settle on a reservation

Crow Flies High (Hidatsa: Beericga Maaguhdaa Neesh; ca. 1830s-1900) was the chief of a band of dissident Hidatsa people from 1870 until their band joined the reservation system in 1894. This band was one of the last to settle on an Indian reservation. A North Dakota State Park is named after him.

== Smallpox epidemic and Like-a-Fishhook Village ==
Smallpox struck the Hidatsa community in 1837 and decimated the population. Together with the remnants of their allies the Mandan tribe, the survivors built the Like-a-Fishhook Village further up the Missouri River around 1845. Having lost his closest relatives in the epidemic, Crow Flies High was raised by Eats-From-The-Line clan members.

In 1870, Crow Flies High left the joint Hidatsa, Mandan and Arikara Indian reservation at Fort Berthold in North Dakota due to conflict with the chiefs. He and his followers settled near the military post Fort Buford. Ordered away in 1884, they built a new village of sheds near the mouth of Little Knife River. By keeping a low profile while hunting small game in the area, the band managed largely to stay outside the reservation system until 1894.

Crow Flies High chose to reject the leadership of the traditional ceremonial elders. His heretical faction gathered around the new leader Bobtail Bull, a Hidatsa, with Crow Flies High functioning as the military chief.

Around this time in 1870, a severe conflict "approaching civil war" emerged in Like-a-Fishhook village. Crow Flies High and Bobtail Bull accused some leaders of unfair distribution of government rations. Tension grew between the rival groups. Persistent rumors about a plan to murder Crow Flies High circulated. Urged to leave at least for a time, Crow Flies High and Bobtail Bull headed up river. From 140 to 200 discontented Hidatsas and Mandans went along. The Hidatsa dissidents came from every clan.

== The Garden Coulee village ==
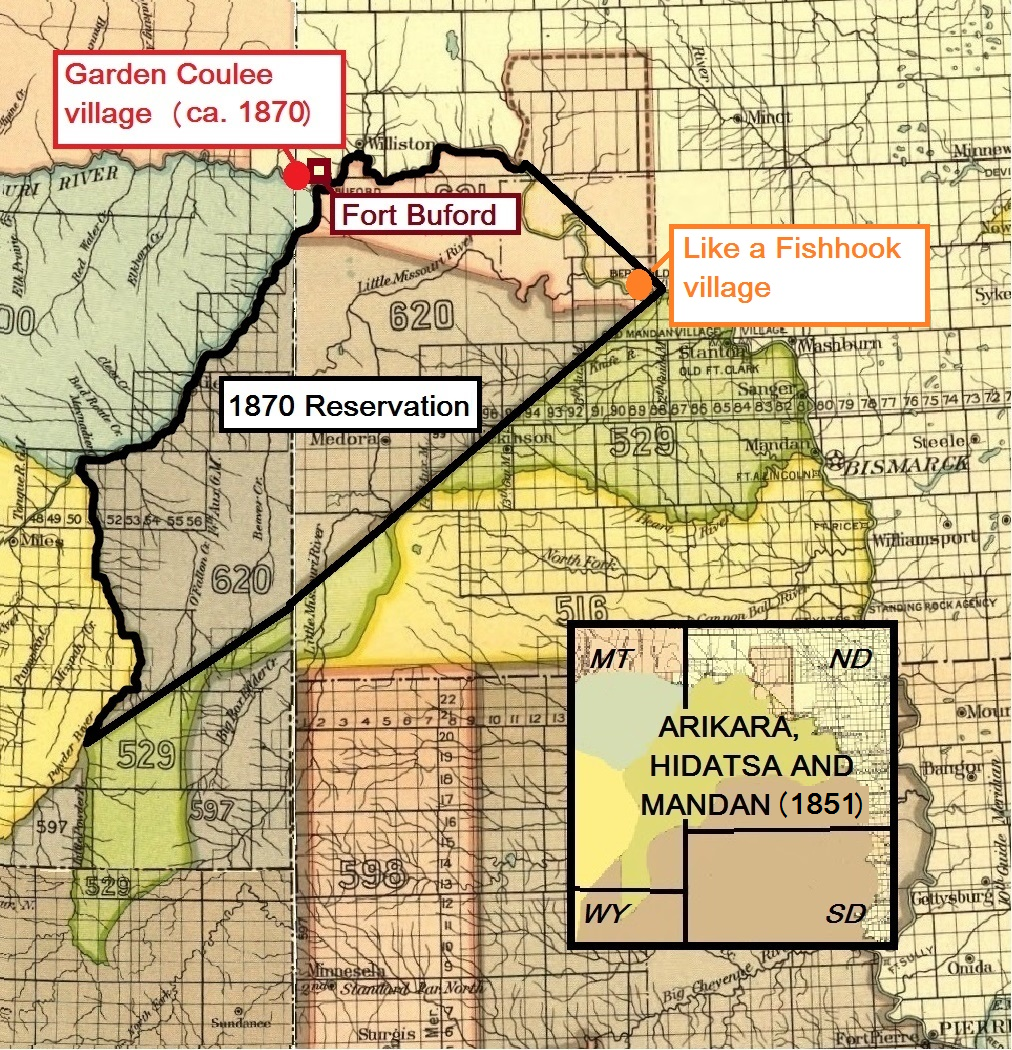
Map 1. Garden Coulee village of Hidatsa chief Crow Flies High. The little map shows the 1851 treaty territory of the Hidatsa, Mandan and Arikara

The dissident band settled on the north bank of the Missouri, about two miles above the mouth of Yellowstone River on an outlying part of the Fort Buford Military Reservation (see Map 1). Nearby Fort Buford reduced the risk of attacks on the small village from the Sioux and it provided a market for furs and robes. The Hidatsa had never fought the U.S. Army and the garrison accepted them in the area. The new settlement consisted mostly of log cabins, earth lodges, and a number of families dug storage pits.

In 1886, Crow Flies High described the early years in the settlement near Garden Coulee. "We subsisted ourselves by hunting Buffalo and Deer ... and selling our hides at Fort Buford". Gardens were laid out as bison became rare. Some of the people enlisted early as scouts and hunters at the fort and received regular pay. Prostitution and begging at the fort occurred when game went scarce. Captain Charles A. Coolidge provided for a number of aged and needy villagers in 1880. On one occasion, Crow Flies High quickly paid damages for a few heads of domestic cattle butchered by young men from the village.

Regularly, families resettled at Like-a-Fishhook Village, while new ones joined the dissidents and moved into vacated log houses. The average population was around 150 when the village was inhabited. It served mainly as a place for the winter and as a stopover for Hidatsa hunting camps going up Yellowstone River. The Garden Coulee villagers received government rations during visits to Like a Fishhook village. With time, Crow Flies High was recognized chief of the village.

=== Unwanted near Fort Buford ===
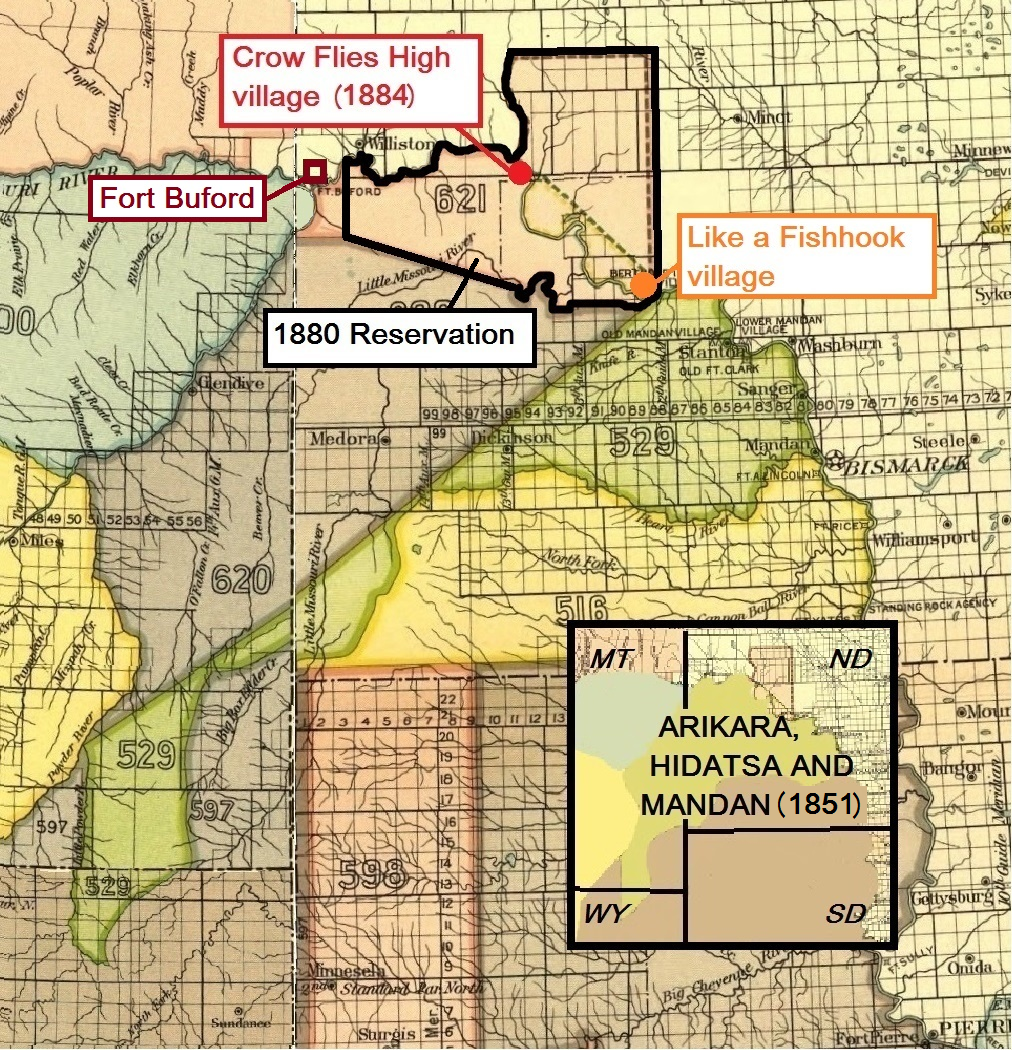
Map 2. Crow Flies High village (1884) and the Fort Berthold reservation

For most of a decade the interactions between the people in the Native settlement and the soldiers at Fort Buford were peaceful. Things changed in 1883. The Sioux were no longer a threat to the fort and the soldiers. The village population climbed to 240 inhabitants. The commander wanted the settlement closed. A few earlier attempts to motivate Crow Flies High to leave Fort Buford Military Reservation and stay on the Fort Berthold Indian Reservation had failed. On September 20, 1884, commanding officer J.N.G. Whistler finally reported the villagers on their way, "... although many of them have been living here for fifteen years". Fort Buford bought the abandoned Indian log cabins for firewood. The migrants spent the 44 dollars thus made on supplies for the movement downstream.

== Crow Flies High village ==
The villagers started a new village on a site near some valleys where they already had small gardens. About twenty-five rectangular cabins were built close to the Missouri River a few miles above the mouth of Little Knife River (see Map 2). A single and simple earth lodge used as a "dance hall" stood in the southern quarter of the village. The settlement was inside the reservation, but more than 50 miles from Like-a-Fishhook Village and "the agency-mission complex".

The Fort Berthold Indian Reservation was reduced late in 1886 (agreement ratified 1891). Once again, the dissidents lived outside its borders (see Map 3). No children attended the reservation school, which was a major concern for the different Indian Agents. Some believed they had persuaded Crow Flies High to consent to reservation rules, just to be disappointed.

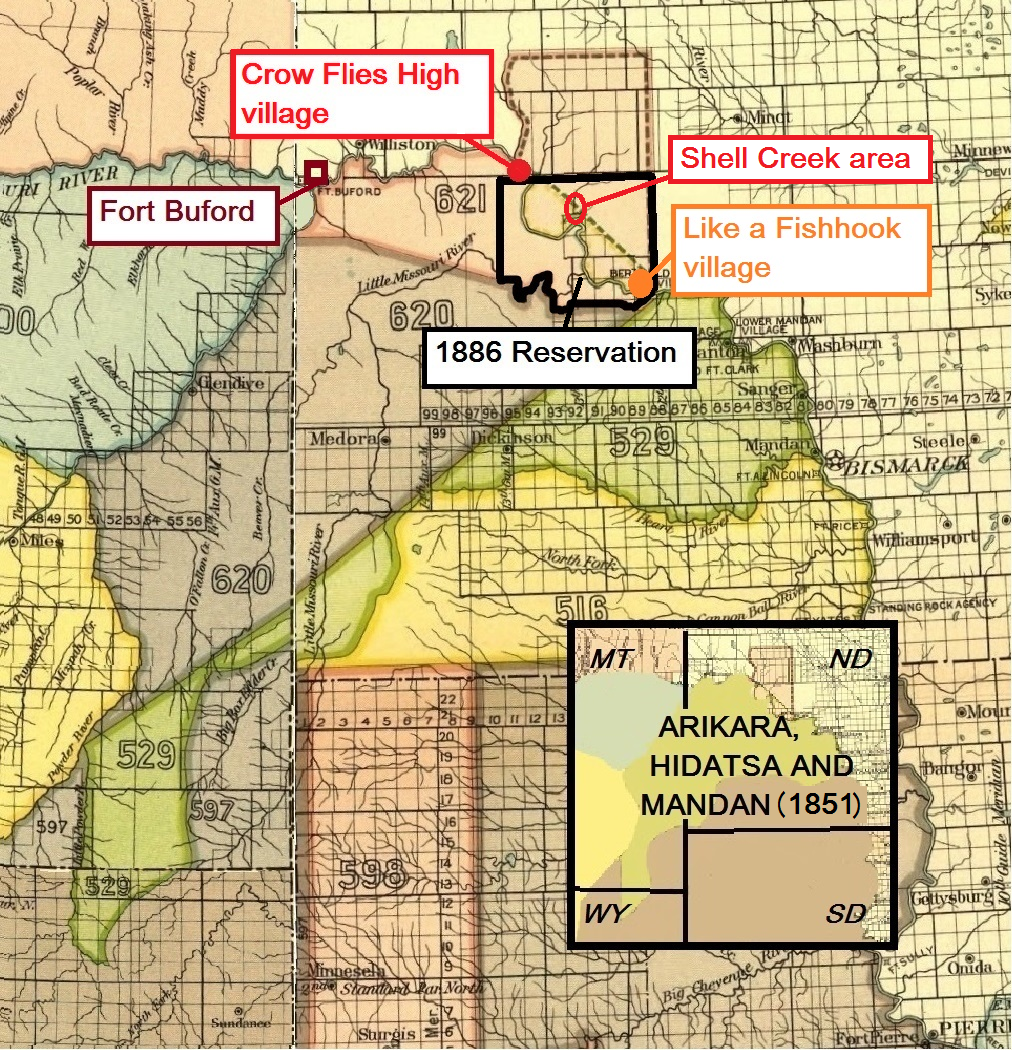
Map 3. The village of Hidatsa chief Crow Flies High and the 1886 boundaries for the Fort Berthold Indian Reservation in North Dakota

Crow Flies High lived in the village with his two wives. A son of his had his own cabin. The village Indians hunted deer and small game and raised crops. They sold firewood to steamboats on the Missouri. Once accused of killing beef cattle by ranchers in the area, Crow Flies High went to the Agency and defended himself and the village. Indian Agent Abram J. Gifford accepted the explanation of Crow Flies High, so the case ended with defeat to the stockgrowers.

== The last years of Crow Flies High ==
In 1894, Crow Flies High resigned as chief. It happened just before Fort Buford soldiers and Hidatsa scouts escorted him and 125 Hidatsa, 23 Mandan and 1 Arikara to the agency. Some Hidatsa would later blame the soldiers for seemingly ignoring "all our men who had gone out and been scouts for them". The people, now under the leadership of Long Bear, traveled in a long line. They used both pack and travois horses as well as Red River carts on the move.

Although assigned allotments all over the reservation, the group slowly assembled in the Shell Creek area.

Crow Flies High died of pneumonia in 1900. The Crow Flies High State Recreation Area in North Dakota is named after him.
