= Like-a-Fishhook Village =

Former settlement in North Dakota, United States

Like-a-Fishhook Village was a Native American settlement next to Fort Berthold in North Dakota, United States, established by dissident bands of the Three Affiliated Tribes, the Mandan, Arikara and Hidatsa. Formed in 1845, it was also eventually inhabited by non-Indian traders, and became important in the trade between Natives and non-Natives in the region.

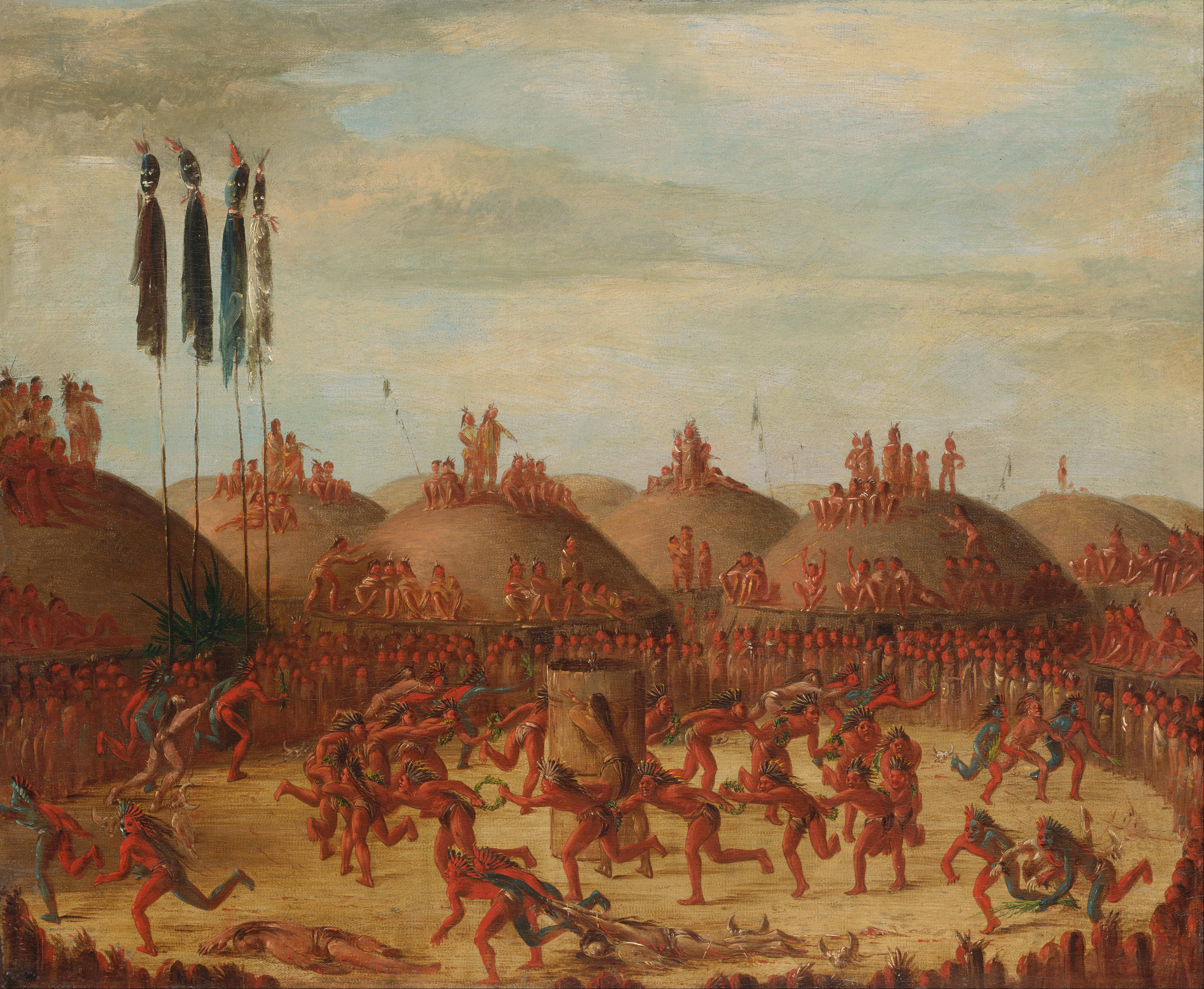
George Catlin - The Last Race, Mandan O-kee-pa Ceremony - Google Art Project. The village Indians on the Upper Missouri lived in towns of earth lodges

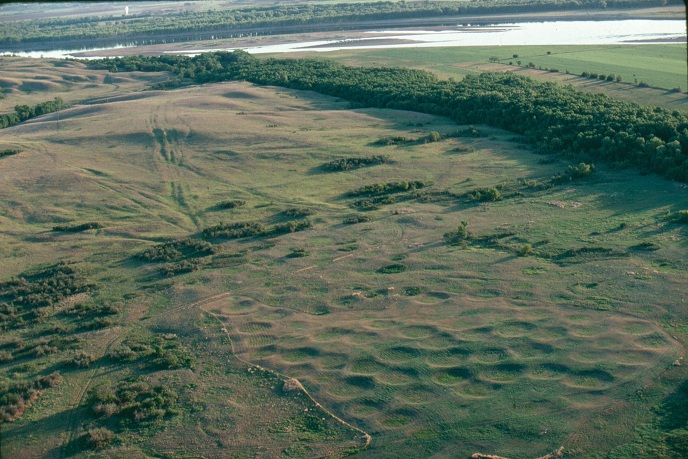
Big-Hidatsa. Aerial view of the old Hidatsa village named Big Hidatsa at Knife River. Each depression shows the site of an earth lodge. Lack of timber and attacks by the Sioux forced the Hidatsa to build a new village at Like a Fishhook Bend.

The village was founded eight years after a disastrous epidemic of smallpox in 1837. The numbers of the dissident Mandan in the region had been reduced to approximately 125; the population of the Hidatsa was also affected, though not as severely. These Mandan and Hidatsa bands were later joined by the Arikara 18 years after the village was constructed.

The village, consisting of earthen lodges and log cabins, was abandoned in the mid-1880s. The site of Like-a-Fishhook Village was lost when the construction of Garrison Dam flooded the area to create Lake Sakakawea in 1954.

== Decision to move ==
"Enemies gave our tribes much trouble after the smallpox year, my grandmother said. Bands of Sioux waylaid hunting parties...", said Buffalo Bird Woman (Hidatsa). Another concern for the Hidatsa and the Mandan was the dwindling amount of wood where they lived in Big Hidatsa at Knife River. The majority of the tribes agreed to build a new settlement in common some place up the Missouri.

A few Mandan stayed behind with the Arikara at the former Mandan head village Mitutanka. Some miles away existed a small Mandan village and the life went on here as usual until the early 1860s. A number of the Hidatsa ceased farming and joined the River Crow at the Yellowstone River.

== Migration ==
The migration started in the spring of 1844, led by Hidatsa chief Four Bears and Missouri River, a Hidatsa medicine man. The people raised a camp on the north banks of the Missouri at a point called Like-a-Fishhook. The name was due to a peculiar bend of the river. The Hidatsa also knew the place as "Dancing Bear".

== Groundwork and site ==
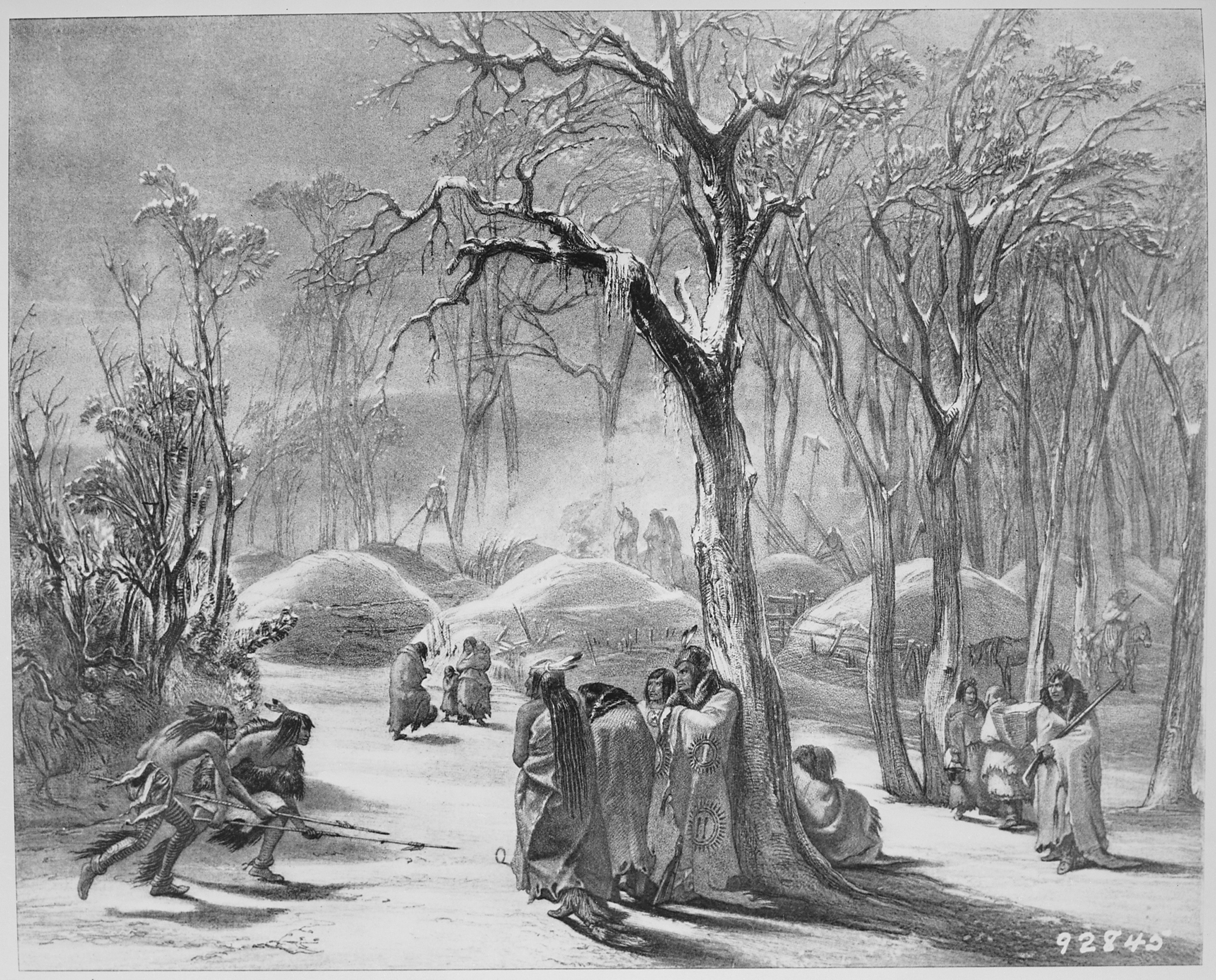
Winter village of the Manitaries (Hidatsa) in Dakota Territory, 1833 - NARA - 530977. An earth lodge in a winter village was small and only used a few months a year. Some times the village was swept away by the Missouri in the spring rise.

"Soon after they came to Like-a-Fishhook bend, the families ... began to clear fields, for gardens." The vegetable plots were located on the river bottomland nearby. The village founders prepared for building round, dome shaped earth lodges with an inner frame of wood during the autumn. They spent the cold season in winter camps. The heavy work of construction began the next year.

Four Bears marked the borders of the village. Missouri River walked over the area and sang songs connected to his sacred bundle. "I want to have the village here so that my people will increase and be safe", he told.

== Village leaders ==
In addition to ceremonial leader Missouri River and war leader Four Bears, four "Protectors of the People" were chosen. Each selected a place for their earth lodge so there would be a powerful protector in each quarter of the village. Bear Looks Out took care of a Corn bundle and selected the southern quarter of the village for his home. Big Cloud protected the east, while the west would be guarded by Bobtail Bull. Bad Horn, also Hidatsa, had a Bear bundle and would have his home to the north.

== The new village ==
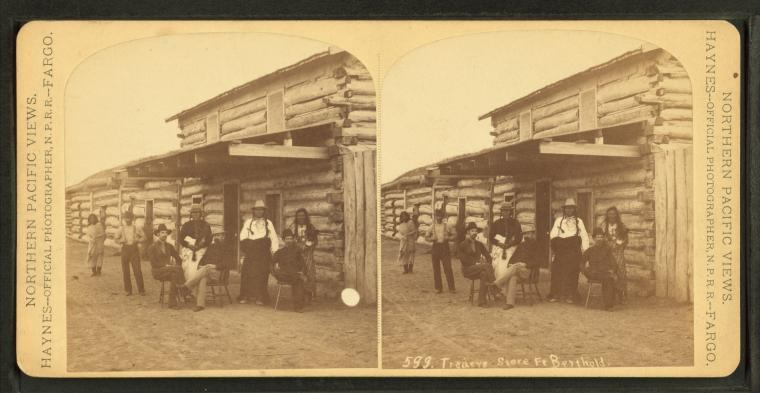
Traders store Ft. Berthold. (Native and Euro-Americans at the trading post at Fort Berthold Agency.), by Haynes, F. Jay (Frank Jay), 1853–1921. Henry A. Boller reported that the most common purchases were coffee, sugar, tea, candy and dried fruit.

A central plaza in the village was an innovation for the Hidatsa, but a tradition among the Mandan. Their sacred cedar had its place in the center. They made a ceremonial lodge next to the plaza and used both during ceremonies like the Okipa. The medicine lodge was usually detectable by its size and flat façade, but a visitor described the one in Like-a-Fishhook Village as being "round". The Hidatsa would from time to time rent the lodge for ceremonies of their own.

The new village consisted of roughly 70 earth lodges, with the homes of leading men facing the plaza. Drying frames for produce from the gardens were visible everywhere. Hidden in the ground were caches for storing the harvest of the summer. The caches could be dug inside the lodge as well as outside. " ... they are often left open [when empty] ... and may entrap the unwary stroller."

The people traded with the recently established Fort Berthold just outside the northern palisade. Occupied by the better part of the Mandan and the Hidatsa, Like-a-Fishhook Village held more people than any of the nearest white towns.

== 1850s ==
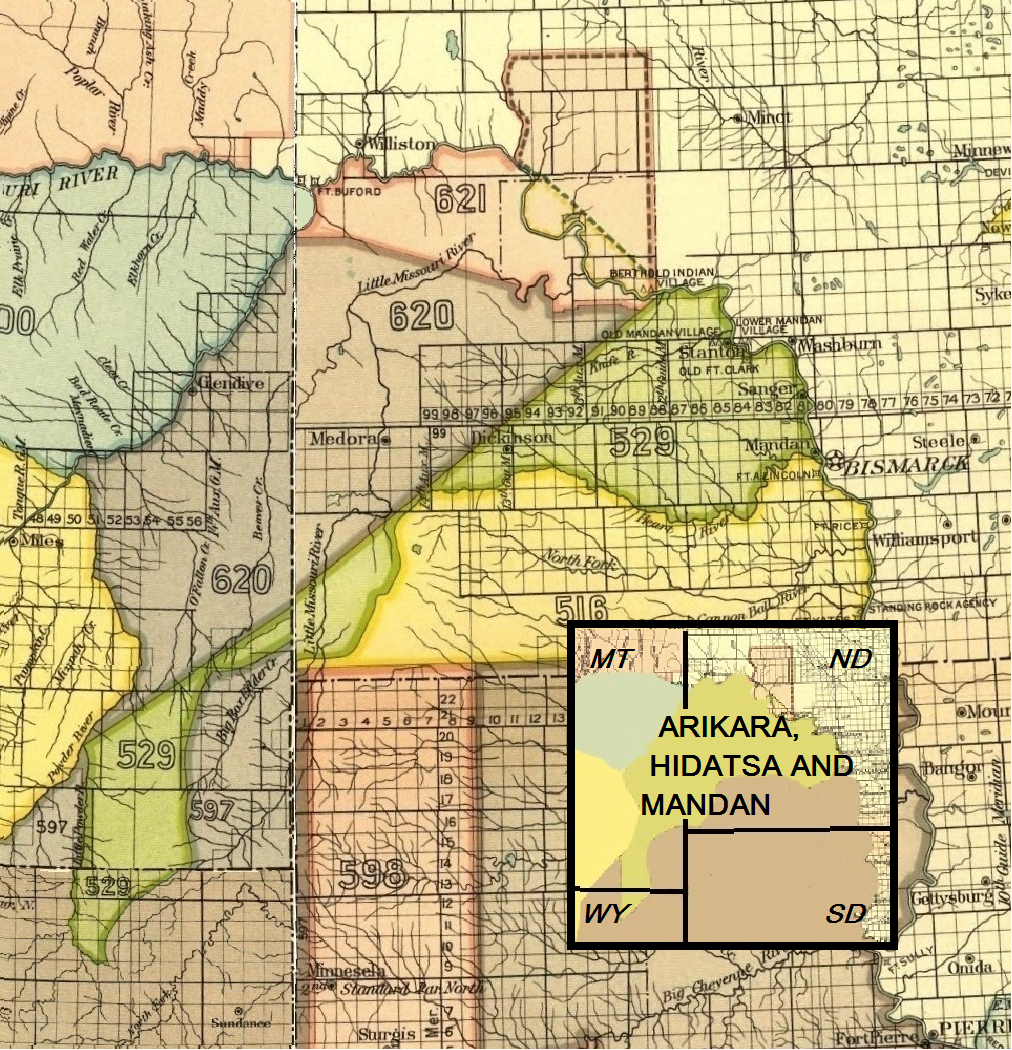
Arikara, Hidatsa and Mandan 1851 treaty territory. (Area 529, 620 and 621 south of the Missouri)

Grasshoppers and hailstorms devastated the crops in 1853 and 1856.

By the end of the decade, the new times had reached the Upper Missouri. Henry A. Boller, a young fur trader, noted how the panes of glass in Four Bears' residence broke one night.

== Arikara arrival ==
The Arikara moved out of Mitutanka with the closing of the nearby trading post Fort Clark in 1860. They build a new village, named Star Village by archaeologists, in the spring of 1862. The settlement was located in view of Like-a-Fishhook Village, but on the south side of the Missouri. A trading visit by some Sioux in August erupted into a fight. Suffering severe losses, the Arikara fled across the river and enlarged Like-a-Fishhook Village with a new, northern district. Like the Mandans, they constructed a ceremonial lodge, but larger. Assisting Surgeon Washington Matthews reports the lodge bordering an open space, which was more or less in form of a square. According to tradition, the "tribal temple" should have been built in the center of the plaza with open space all around it. The influx of the Arikara nearly doubled up the population in the village, so more than 2,000 people lived there. (This may be compared to the total of 2,405 citizens in North Dakota in 1870.)

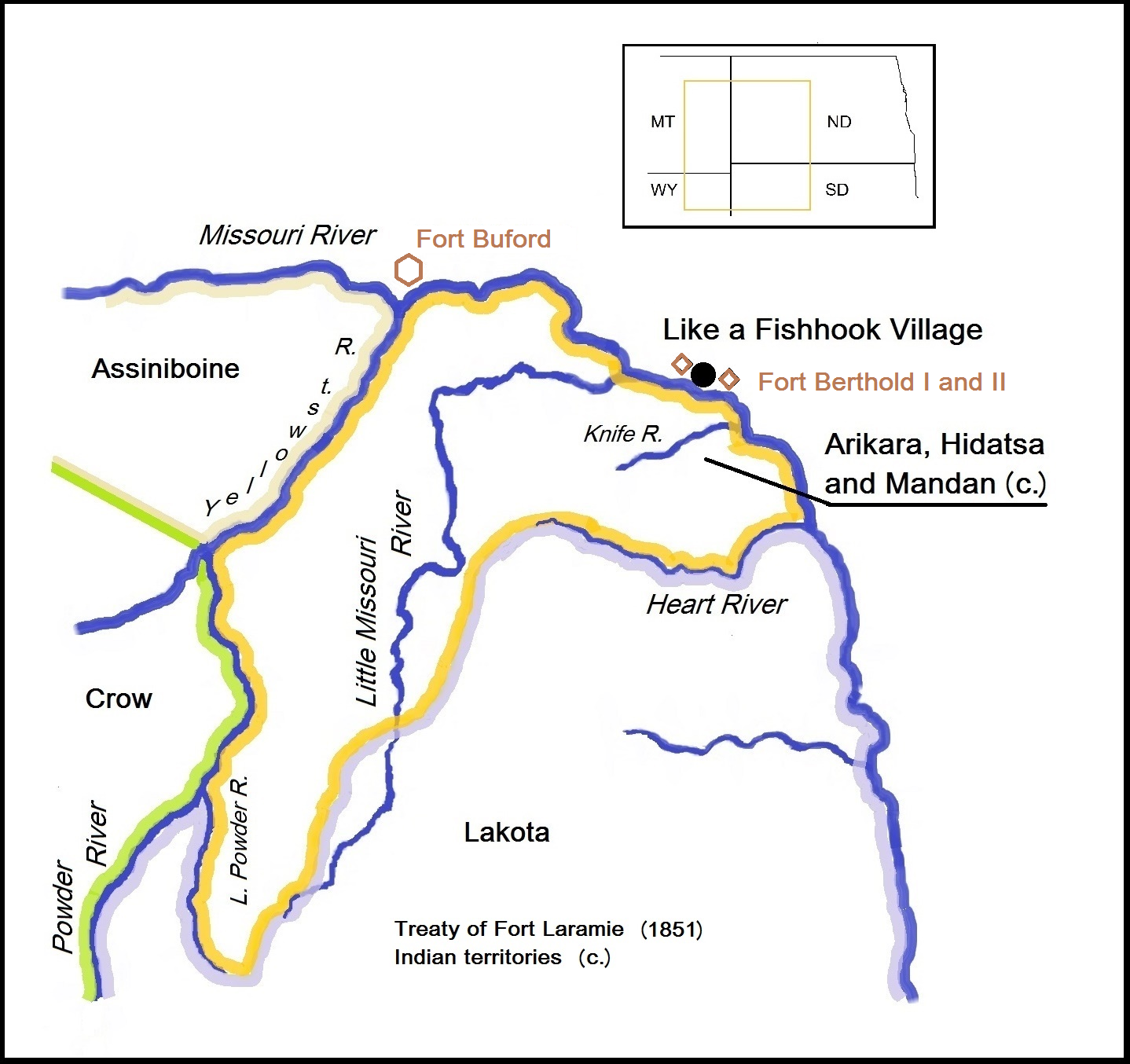
Arikara, Hidatsa and Mandan Indian territory, 1851. Like-a-Fishhook Village, Fort Berthold I and II and military post Fort Buford, North Dakota. The village was outside the treaty territory.

== Burning of the village ==
Every winter the people moved to temporary quarters in the river bottomland, which were better sheltered against chilly storms. Some Sioux set fire to (Fort Berthold II) and Like-a Fishook Village caught fire as well. After heavy fighting the men at the fort got reinforcement from some of the Natives in the winter villages. " ... the Sioux came against our village in the winter time and stole our corn and burned down my father's lodge", remembered Buffalo Bird Woman.

== New neighbors ==
A year before the burning of the village, some Yankton Sioux killed chief Four Bears. In 1864, Like-a-Fishhook Village got new neighbors with the arrival of armed forces at the former trading post Fort Berthold II. They remained to 1867. The next year the army constructed Fort Stevenson some 14 miles away. It was the new center of military power in the Department of Dakota's Middle District, although it lacked the capacity to stop the Sioux's raiding.

== Late 1860s ==
In the mid-1860s, the most typical building in Like-a-Fishhook Village was still the earth lodge. The palisade became firewood in the winter of 1865. Like-a-Fishhook Village was now 20 years old and a burying ground with scaffolds to the dead, called open-air tombs, lay behind it. However, the Arikara buried their dead in the ground (as some Hidatsa families also preferred), and the custom was increasingly adopted by the two other tribes.

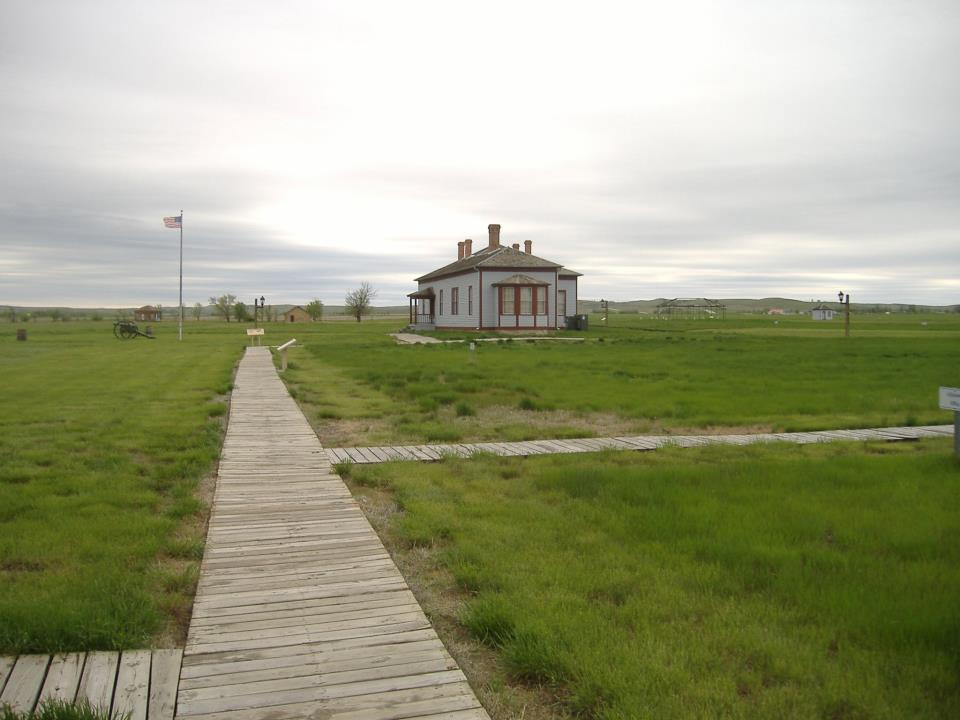
Fort Buford. The two Hidatsa "rebels", Bobtail Bull and Crow Flies High, made a new Hidatsa village not far from the military post Fort Buford.

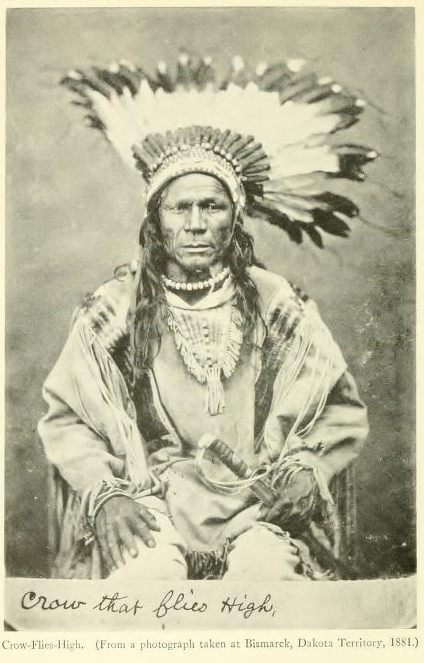
Hidatsa Chief and rebel Crow Flies High

== Bobtail Bull and Crow Flies High ==
Like-a-Fishhook Village suffered a division among the residents in the early 1870s. The Hidatsa rebels Bobtail Bull, Crow Flies High and their followers left and built new log cabins and earth lodges near the military post Fort Buford. The unrest in the village was "approaching civil war" before the exit calmed down a conflict between the dissidents and the old leaders of the village.

== Last major Sioux attack ==
In 1874, a large war party of reservation Sioux had Fort Berthold as its target. George Armstrong Custer delayed his Black Hills Expedition to ride to the Fort. His orders from General Phil Sheridan said "The Rees [Arikara] and Mandans should be protected same as white settlers". Five Arikara and "Foolish-head" (who was either Mandan or Hidatsa) died in the battle. This was the last major battle that affected the village.

== Flood of the whites ==
The villagers counted more and more houses with whites around them. A blacksmith, a doctor and the Indian Agent lived in Fort Berthold Agency a mile and a half away along with other newcomers. Missionary Charles L. Hall taught the words of God in his home close to the village from 1876. The next year the Indian children could attend either the Mission School or one supervised by the government.

== Post-abandonment ==
The allotment of land in 1886 caused the collapse of Like-a-Fishhook Village. Many Arikara had already taken up farming on individual plots. Their quarter of the village was desolate and their homes destroyed. A few years later only some of the older Mandan in the village still followed their traditional way of life. Hidatsa chief Poor Wolf led the migration of his people to new places on the reservation. "Older Indians, who came from Like-a-Fishhook Village, find their life on allotments rather lonesome. Cabins are often two or three miles apart ..." related Hidatsa Indian Goodbird in 1914. The Mandan, the Hidatsa and the Arikara were no more village Indians. The location of the village is now under the waters of the reservoir behind Garrison Dam.
